= 2014–15 APOEL FC season =

APOEL
2014–15 season
- Chairman: Prodromos Petrides
- Manager: Georgios Donis (Until 6 January 2015); Thorsten Fink (10 January 2015 – 11 May 2015); Gustavo Manduca (Caretaker: 11 May 2015 – 24 May 2015)
- Stadium: GSP Stadium, Nicosia
- Cypriot First Division: 1st
- Cypriot Cup: Winners
- Cypriot Super Cup: Runners-up
- UEFA Champions League: Group stage
- Top goalscorer: League: Rafik Djebbour (14); All: Rafik Djebbour (17)
- Highest home attendance: 20,626 vs Barcelona (25 November 2014 – UEFA Champions League)
- Lowest home attendance: 1,139 (Note: The match was played behind closed doors due to APOEL's punishment for the incidents in the match against AEL Limassol on 11 January 2015. Only children up to 12 years who were accompanied by their mothers and people beyond 65 years were allowed to attend the match.) vs Ethnikos (7 February 2015 – Cypriot First Division)
- Average home league attendance: 9,014 (all competitions)
Home colours	Away colours	Third colours

The 2014–15 season was APOEL's 75th season in the Cypriot First Division and 87th year in existence as a football club.

== Season review ==
=== Head coach changes ===
January 2015: On 6 January 2015, APOEL and Georgios Donis parted company by mutual agreement after a poor run of performances and results, culminating in a 1–1 home draw against the last-placed Ayia Napa. Georgios Donis was replaced by German coach Thorsten Fink, who (on 10 January 2015) signed a contract until the end of the 2014–15 season, with the option of a further season.

May 2015: On 11 May 2015, one day after a questionable 1–0 loss to Apollon Limassol and following a run of disappointing performances, Thorsten Fink was sacked by APOEL, although at that moment the team were two points clear at the top of the league with only two matches remaining. The same day, APOEL's technical director Gustavo Manduca, who only hung up his boots last month, took over as caretaker manager for the team's crucial final two league games of the season, as well as the Cypriot Cup final, alongside assistant coach Giorgos Kostis and former skipper Marinos Satsias.

=== Pre-season and friendlies ===
The first training session for the season took place on 27 June 2014 at THOI Lakatamia stadium. On 2 July 2014, the team flew to Gdańsk in Poland to perform the main stage of their pre-season training and returned to Cyprus on 19 July 2014. During the pre-season training stage in Poland, APOEL played three friendly matches against Žalgiris Vilnius, Lechia Gdańsk and Arka Gdynia. APOEL drew 1–1 with Žalgiris Vilnius and won both Lechia Gdańsk and Arka Gdynia by 2–1. After their return to Cyprus the team played two friendly matches, beating Greek side Ergotelis 2–0 at GSP Stadium and Doxa Katokopias 3–0 at Makario Stadium. Also, during the fifteen-day break between the third qualifying round and the play-off round of the UEFA Champions League in August, APOEL played three more friendlies, beating Othellos 3–1 and Ayia Napa 2–1 and losing 1–2 against Othellos.

=== Cypriot Super Cup ===
On 13 August 2014, APOEL lost 1–2 to Ermis Aradippou at Antonis Papadopoulos Stadium in the super cup final. Jonatas Belusso opened the scoring for Ermis after just eight seconds, taking advantage of Mário Sérgio's mistake. APOEL managed to equalize in the second minute of the stoppage time, when Dragan Žarković put the ball in his own net from an Efstathios Aloneftis corner kick. However, the match was not over. With the game being in the fifth minute of the stoppage time and set for penalties, Giannis Taralidis with a direct free kick struck the ball beyond the reach of Tassos Kissas for an epic finish, handing Ermis victory in their first ever Super Cup appearance.

=== Cypriot First Division ===
==== Regular season ====
APOEL's opening Cypriot First Division match against Anorthosis was originally scheduled on 23 August 2014, but was postponed and rescheduled to 24 September 2014, because of APOEL's UEFA Champions League play-off matches against Aalborg BK. On 31 August 2014, APOEL opened their competitive season with an important 2–0 win at GSZ Stadium against AEK Larnaca. Gustavo Manduca, who came on as a 56th-minute substitute, opened the proceedings in the 58th minute and scored a second goal in the last minute of the match, to clinch three vital points for his team. On 13 September 2014, four days before the historical UEFA Champions League match against Barcelona at Camp Nou, APOEL struggled to pick up a 1–0 win at home over Ermis Aradippou. The match was deadlocked until the 88th minute, when Cillian Sheridan finally grabbed the winner from close range, after Vinícius' left-wing cross. On 20 September 2014, APOEL came away with three points, making it three wins out of three games with a 3–1 victory at Ayia Napa. APOEL managed to go ahead 3–0 from the first half with goals by Constantinos Charalambides in the 10th minute, Pieros Sotiriou two minutes later and Gustavo Manduca in the 36th minute. They also managed to hang on, despite being down to 10 men from the 39th minute after Kaká conceded a penalty and was shown the red card. Ayia Napa, which missed the penalty they won in the first half, was able only to pull one back with Vasil Panayotov in the 63rd minute. On 24 September 2014 – in the first matchweek match which was postponed and rescheduled – APOEL beat Anorthosis 2–0 at home and moved three points clear at the top of the table. APOEL had to wait until the 65th minute to open the scoring through Gustavo Manduca, with Efstathios Aloneftis sealing the win 15 minutes from time after taking the rebound from Gustavo Manduca's missed penalty. On 27 September 2014, APOEL dropped their first points of the season, their perfect four-game opening ended by a 0–0 draw against AEL Limassol at GSP Stadium. On 6 October 2014, APOEL came from behind to beat Othellos 2–1 at Antonis Papadopoulos Stadium. Thiago gave Othellos the lead in the 54th minute after a mistake from John Arne Riise, before the Norwegian defender made amends by supplying a sublime cross for Gustavo Manduca's equaliser ten minutes later. Algerian striker Rafik Djebbour opened his goalscoring account for APOEL five minutes before the end, netting the winner with a powerful header after Cillian Sheridan's cross. On 26 October 2014, Rafik Djebbour's header in the 26th minute was enough to give APOEL a 1–0 win over Nea Salamina at GSP Stadium and continue their impressive start to the season. On 1 November 2014, APOEL crushed Ethnikos Achna 4–0 at Dasaki Stadium and remained unbeaten, four points clear at the top of the table. Cillian Sheridan scored twice in the beginning of each half, with Nektarios Alexandrou adding a third and leading scorer Gustavo Manduca getting the fourth. On 10 November 2014, APOEL were held to a goalless draw by Doxa Katokopias at GSP Stadium and their gap ahead of second placed Apollon Limassol was reduced to 2 points. APOEL missed a great chance to grab the three points when Gustavo Manduca's penalty was saved by Doxas' goalkeeper three minutes before the end. On 21 November 2014, APOEL were held again to a goalless draw by second-placed Apollon Limassol at Tsirion Stadium and remained unbeaten in the Cypriot top flight, two points clear at the top of the table. On 30 November 2014, APOEL beat arch-rivals Omonia 1–0 at GSP Stadium, with ex-Omonia midfielder Giorgos Efrem scoring the vital winner in the 38th minute after an amazing backheel pass by Gustavo Manduca. On 5 December 2014, APOEL squeezed past Anorthosis at Antonis Papadopoulos Stadium with a 1–0 victory thanks to a Rafik Djebbour goal nine minutes from time. At the same time, AEK Larnaca humbled second-placed Apollon 3–1 thus allowing APOEL to extend their lead at the top of the Cyprus league to five points. On 15 December 2014, APOEL drew 4–4 with AEK Larnaca in a fascinating match at GSP Stadium and maintained their lead in the standings, but the gap over second-placed Apollon was reduced to three points. AEK took the lead just after 13 minutes with Nikos Englezou, but Rafik Djebbour equalized four minutes later with a volley inside the box. AEK score a second one thanks to a José Kanté header in the 20th minute and just before the break they extended their lead to two goals through a strike from distance by Jorge Larena. One minute after the break, APOEL reduced the deficit to one goal with Rafik Djebbour scoring his second of the match, heading in Mário Sérgio's corner. Nine minutes later, however, AEK extended their lead to two goals again with José Kanté finishing from close range, before Gustavo Manduca miss a penalty for APOEL in the 73rd minute. However, Pieros Sotiriou who came on as a second-half substitute, was the hero for APOEL scoring twice in the last five minutes. He first scored with a sliding volley in the 85th minute and five minutes later he placed the ball into the bottom corner from just outside the box to give APOEL a hard-earned point. On 20 December 2014, APOEL's unbeaten run came to an end as they lost 2–1 away to Ermis Aradippou. The Cypriot First Division leaders went 13 games unbeaten prior to this match but went into the winter break suffering their first league loss, allowing Apollon Limassol to go level on points with them. Pieros Sotiriou put APOEL in front after just six minutes, but Ifeanyi Onyilo scored in the beginning of the second half and in the last minute of the match, to give Ermis the three points. On 5 January 2015, APOEL's winless run continued after an unexpected 1–1 home draw against the last-placed Ayia Napa. Giorgos Efrem broke the deadlock for APOEL after 60 minutes before Georgios Kolokoudias hit back with a stunning free-kick in the last minute of the match. One day later, APOEL parted company with coach Georgios Donis, following the team's poor run of performances and results. On 11 January 2015, under caretaker coach Savvas Paraskeva, APOEL suffered a 2–1 away defeat against AEL Limassol and dropped to the 2nd place for the first time in the season. A brace of second half goals from Nigerian striker Marco Tagbajumi cancelled out John Arne Riise's early opener and condemned APOEL to their second loss in the season. On 11 January 2015, under new coach Thorsten Fink, APOEL extended their winless run to five games after a 1–1 home draw with Othellos and remained in the second place, three points behind leaders Apollon. Othellos took the lead in the 50th minute with Elgujja Grigalashvili's long shot and Rafik Djebbour equalized eight minutes later after receiving a long pass from João Guilherme. In the fourth minute of the added time Marios Antoniades hit the bar with a close header and APOEL missed a great chance to win the three points. On 31 January 2015, Rafik Djebbour's fifth-minute goal proved to be enough for APOEL as they beat Nea Salamina 1–0 at Ammochostos Stadium and ended their five-game winless run. APOEL could score more goals as they missed several chances, including a lost penalty by Rafik Djebbour in the 22nd minute which was saved by Salamina's goalkeeper Ram Strauss. On 7 February 2015, APOEL continued their improving performances under Thorsten Fink with a comfortable 4–0 win over Ethnikos Achna at GSP Stadium. APOEL opened the scoring in the 19th minute through Martin Lanig and three minutes after the break John Arne Riise scored a volley to double his team's lead. In the 73rd minute, Giorgos Efrem chipped the ball past the oncoming Mathieu Valverde to extend APOEL's lead to three goals and two minutes later Rafik Djebbour scored his eighth league goal in the season to make it 4–0. On 14 February 2015, APOEL recorded their third consecutive league victory after beating Doxa Katokopias 2–0 at Makario Stadium, thanks to an early goal by John Arne Riise and an own goal by João Leonardo. On 21 February 2015, APOEL secured a dramatic last minute 1–0 win over title rivals Apollon Limassol at GSP Stadium and moved to the top of the table, level on points with Apollon. Despite playing the final 20 minutes a man down after Kaká’s dismissal, APOEL secured the valuable three points in the last minute of the added time with Nuno Morais netting the winner with a close-range header after Rafik Djebbour's cross from the left. On 28 February 2015, APOEL were held to a 1–1 draw by Omonia and finished the regular season in 2nd place, two points behind leaders Apollon Limassol. APOEL went ahead on the half hour mark with Nuno Morais who finished off Constantinos Charalambides deep free-kick inside the box, but Omonia equalized eight minutes from time when Gaossou Fofana blasted the ball past Urko Pardo after a poor defensive clearance.

==== Play-offs ====
On 7 March 2015, in its first Championship play-off match, APOEL beat Anorthosis 1–0 at GSP Stadium and moved to the top of the league table, one point ahead of Apollon. APOEL produced one of their best performances since Thorsten Fink took over in January 2015, and got the three points thanks to a fortuitous John Arne Riise cross that was deflected over the visitors keeper Thomas Kaminski, just after the half hour mark. On 14 March 2015, APOEL were held to a 1–1 draw by Omonia and Apollon took advantage of APOEL's draw to move one point clear at the top of the table after beating AEK Larnaca. Omonia took the lead in the sixth minute when André Schembri managed to squeeze the ball past the unsighted APOEL keeper Dionisis Chiotis and Rafik Djebbour headed the equalizer for APOEL in the 37th minute after receiving a Constantinos Charalambides' cross from the right. In the top-of-the-table clash on 21 March 2015, APOEL and Apollon shared the spoils with a 2–2 draw at GSP Stadium, with all four goals being scored in the first half. Despite a host of players missing, APOEL had twice taken the lead, first through Tiago Gomes and then through new signing Valmir Nafiu but they were twice pegged back through Gastón Sangoy's penalty and then through Fotis Papoulis who took advantage of a slip at APOEL's defense. On 4 April 2015, APOEL suffered their first defeat under German coach Thorsten Fink after going down 1–0 to AEK Larnaca at GSZ Stadium and remained one point behind Apollon, who also lost 3–1 at home to Anorthosis. The only goal of the game came six minutes before half-time after a string of errors in APOEL's backline allowed forward Nestoras Mitidis to beat Dionisis Chiotis from just inside the penalty box, while APOEL went down to 10 men in the 58th minute after Carlão received a second yellow card. On 19 April 2015, APOEL returned to the top of the table following their easy 3–0 home win against Ermis Aradippou and Apollon's 1–0 defeat by Omonia. An early strike from Martin Lanig followed by a goal in each half from Rafik Djebbour, sent APOEL two points clear at the top of the table with five games left to go in the end-of-season playoffs. On 25 April 2015, APOEL came from behind three times to earn a thrilling 3–3 draw against Anorthosis at Antonis Papadopoulos Stadium and remained top of the table as all other championship play-off matches ended also in draw. Former APOEL striker Esmaël Gonçalves gave the Anorthosis the lead twice in the first half, with Constantinos Charalambides and Georgios Efrem answering for APOEL in the first half and early in the second half respectively. Andreas Makris restored the lead for Anorthosis in the second half, before a late Jason Demetriou own goal restored parity. APOEL, who hit the post three times, could have clinched it deep into injury time but their top scorer Rafik Djebbour blasted over from close range with the goal gaping. On 2 May 2015, APOEL defeated arch rivals Omonia 3–2 at GSP Stadium and widened its lead at the top of the table to five points after Apollon went down 0–2 to AEK Larnaca. APOEL had taken a first-half lead against ten-men Omonia, who saw Ucha Lobjanidze receive a double-booking in quick succession for a foul and then dissent, through Tomás De Vincenti's penalty in the 37th minute. Omonia made a comeback in the 54th minute and equalised with Nuno Assis, who kept up his scoring form soon after netted his second goal to give his team the lead in the 56th minute. Nektarios Alexandrou leveled proceedings three minutes later, before Rafik Djebbour bundled home John Arne Riise's header in the fourth minute of stoppage time, helping APOEL to take a giant leap towards sealing the 24th league title in their history. On 10 May 2015, APOEL lost 1–0 to Apollon Limassol in a scrappy top of the table clash at Tsirion Stadium thanks to a Fotis Papoulis winner in the 67th minute. The win brought Apollon with two points of leaders APOEL, just two matches before the end of the season. On 11 May 2015, one day after the team's loss to Apollon and following a run of disappointing performances, Thorsten Fink was sacked by APOEL, although at that moment the team were at the top of the league, with only two matches remaining. The same day, APOEL's technical director Gustavo Manduca, who only hung up his boots last month, took over as caretaker manager for the team's crucial final two league games of the season, as well as the Cypriot Cup final, alongside assistant coach Giorgos Kostis and former skipper Marinos Satsias. On 16 May 2015, APOEL missed out on the chance to celebrate their 24th league title after battling to a 1–1 draw with AEK Larnaca, but the gap over second-placed Apollon (who lost to Anorthosis) was increased to three points, meaning that now APOEL was needing only a draw in their final game at Ermis Aradippou to lift the trophy. Gustavo Manduca made his debut in the dugout for APOEL since taking over as caretaker manager after the dismissal of Thorsten Fink and got his first taste of pressure on the bench when Serbian midfielder Vladimir Boljević scored from the penalty spot to give AEK Larnaca the lead after just 12 minutes. Tomás De Vincenti levelled the score in the 24th minute after converting a penalty won by Brazilian defender Kaká, while APOEL missed a great chance to win the league title when Cillian Sheridan's 77th minute shot came off the post and Efstathios Aloneftis couldn't strike home the rebound. On 24 May 2015, APOEL secured their third consecutive championship title and their second double in a row after beating Ermis Aradippou 4–2 at Ammochostos Stadium on the last day of the season. APOEL got off to a perfect start when Tomás De Vincenti opened the score with a low drive in the 9th minute and Constantinos Charalambides doubled the score soon after. Giannis Taralidis pulled one back for Ermis after 15 minutes, but APOEL restored their two-goal cushion through their top scorer Rafik Djebbour who scored from the penalty spot five minutes later. In the 39th minute, Rafik Djebbour scored his second of the day after good work by Nuno Morais to give APOEL a three goals half-time lead. Former APOEL forward Andreas Papathanasiou made it 4–2 immediately after half-time, but there was no spoiling the party which was already underway in the stands as APOEL were crowned champions for the 24th time in their history.

=== Cypriot Cup ===
==== Second round ====
APOEL won the Cypriot cup last season and as such entered the second round of the competition. APOEL were drawn to face Cypriot Second Division side Olympiakos Nicosia. On 14 January 2015, in (new coach) Thorsten Fink's debut, APOEL secured a narrow 1–0 advantage over Olympiakos at Makario Stadium thanks to a Rafik Djebbour goal from the penalty spot in the 73rd minute. On 28 January 2015, APOEL reached a comfortable 3–0 home win over Olympiakos for an aggregate 4–0 victory, thanks to goals from Tomás De Vincenti, Cillian Sheridan and Giorgos Efrem.

==== Quarter-finals ====
APOEL were drawn to face Anorthosis in the quarter-finals of the Cypriot Cup. In the first leg of their Cypriot Cup quarter-finals clash on 4 March 2015, Anorthosis and APOEL produced an enthralling 0–0 draw at Antonis Papadopoulos Stadium, with both teams missing some great chances to win the game. Despite this Thorsten Fink decided to rest many first-team players in the second leg, APOEL went through to the semi-finals of the Cypriot Cup after an easy 2–0 win over Anorthosis at GSP Stadium. Algerian star Rafik Djebbour was the hero, coming on as a 62nd-minute substitute and scoring twice after 67 and 80 minutes.

==== Semi-finals ====
APOEL were drawn to face arch rivals Omonia in the semi-finals of the Cypriot Cup. On 8 April 2015, APOEL trashed Omonia 3–0 in the first leg of their semi-final clash and took a giant step in the defence of their Cypriot Cup title. Martin Lanig gave APOEL the lead after 35 minutes, with former Liverpool star John Arne Riise making it 2–0 just four minutes later and Tomás De Vincenti adding a third 12 minutes from time. On 22 April 2015, APOEL moved into their second successive Cypriot Cup final after riding out an easy 0–0 away draw against rivals Omonia to advance 3–0 on aggregate.

==== Final ====
On 20 May 2015, APOEL clinched their 21st Cypriot Cup title and their second in successive seasons with a convincing 4–2 victory over AEL Limassol at GSZ Stadium in Larnaca. APOEL fell behind to an early Maic Sema goal, but Tomás De Vincenti drew the sides level after 31 minutes, beating goalkeeper Karim Fegrouche with a clever 35-meter lob direct from a free-kick. Giorgos Efrem put APOEL in front just before half-time, poking the ball in from close range, and the Cyprus international was on target again immediately after the interval, curling into the empty net after Karim Fegrouche came rushing off his line. Former Liverpool FC defender John Arne Riise drilled in a trademark 30-meter thunderbolt free-kick goal on the hour to put the contest beyond doubt for a side now on the verge of a second successive double and Valentinos Sielis just scored a late consolation to make the final score 4–2.

=== UEFA Champions League ===
==== Third qualifying round ====
APOEL won the Cypriot league last season and as such entered the third qualifying round of the 2014–15 UEFA Champions League. APOEL started their campaign against Finnish side HJK Helsinki.

On 30 July 2014, APOEL came from two goals down to hold HJK Helsinki to a 2–2 draw at Sonera Stadium in the first leg of their third qualifying round tie. Demba Savage scored twice in the first half, breaking the deadlock after 11 minutes and converting a penalty on the cusp of the interval to stun APOEL. Macoumba Kandji's second yellow card shortly after the restart undermined the hosts' good work, and APOEL ruthlessly wiped out the advantage with two goals in four minutes. Tomás De Vincenti put APOEL back in contention with a header after 71 minutes, before then setting up Cillian Sheridan three minutes later to put the Nicosia club back in the driving seat ahead of the second leg at Nicosia.

On 6 August 2014, APOEL sealed their passage to the play-off round with a comfortable 2–0 win over HJK Helsinki at GSP Stadium. The game's opening goal came when Tomás De Vincenti won possession in midfield and quickly released Cillian Sheridan who showed great composure in slotting the ball past Michael Tørnes in the HJK goal. The dangerous Tomás De Vincenti doubled his side's lead in the 43rd minute, when he was caught by a high foot in the area and converted the penalty himself. APOEL continued to press in the second half and were unlucky not to add to their lead through Vinícius, the midfielder seeing his shots hitting the bar twice. The win guaranteed that APOEL would feature in the group stages of a European competition for the fourth time in six years, as even if they were to suffer defeat in the play-off round, they would go directly into the UEFA Europa League group stage.

==== Play-off round ====
APOEL were drawn to face Danish champions Aalborg BK in the play-off round of the Champions League, as they attempt to reach the group stages for the third time in their history.

On 20 August 2014, APOEL came from behind to earn a valuable 1–1 draw against Aalborg at Nordjyske Arena in the first leg of their Champions League play-off round tie. A 16th-minute strike from Nicolaj Thomsen gave Aalborg a well-merited lead, but Brazilian midfielder Vinícius handed APOEL a 54th-minute equaliser, as well as an away goal which could prove decisive early into the second half.

On 26 August 2014, APOEL crushed Aalborg 4–0 at GSP Stadium and secured their place in the group stage of the UEFA Champions League for the third time in their history. APOEL consolidated their advantage just before the half-hour when Tomás De Vincenti cut the ball back from out on the wing to the awaiting Vinícius on the edge of the area and the Brazilian scored with a neat strike which wrong-footed the keeper to give APOEL a vital lead. Mário Sérgio's out-swinging corner was met by Tomás De Vincenti who crept in unmarked to hit home from the edge of the six-yard box into the roof of the net, giving APOEL a two-goal cushion one minute before the break. Efstathios Aloneftis, who came on in the 61st minute, put away APOEL's third goal three minutes later, after he brought down João Guilherme's sweeping cross-field ball and stroke the ball across goal and into the corner. The crowning fourth goal was similarly direct, Cillian Sheridan beating Rasmus Thelander to Urko Pardo's long kick forward and cutting on to his left foot to outgun Nicolai Larsen from the edge of the box, ensuring APOEL go into group stage draw full of confidence.

==== Group stage ====

APOEL's 2014–15 UEFA Champions League lineup that drew 1–1 with Ajax at home and secured the club's only point in Group F.

Seeded in Pot 4 for the group stage draw, APOEL drawn in Group F, alongside Barcelona, Paris Saint-Germain and Ajax.

On 17 September 2014, APOEL opened their Champions League campaign with a 1–0 defeat against Barcelona at Camp Nou, but left the Catalan capital with all the plaudits following a stellar display which so nearly earned a historic result. APOEL defended solidly and did well to thwart Barca's formidable strike force, while occasionally threatening the home goal. Barcelona found the breakthrough when Gerard Piqué headed Lionel Messi's free kick into the bottom corner of the net in the 28th minute. Lionel Messi came close to scoring when he stung APOEL goalkeeper Urko Pardo's fingers with a rasping strike from Neymar's layoff five minutes before the break and was denied by a superb last-ditch block by Mário Sérgio at the death. In a frantic finish to an otherwise dull affair, APOEL had their best opening of the match moments later and Barca goalkeeper Marc-André ter Stegen had to be alert to palm away Gustavo Manduca's powerful effort and preserve Barça's 1–0 lead. On 30 September 2014, APOEL secured their first point in Group F, after a 1–1 draw against Ajax at GSP Stadium. Ajax opened the scoring in the 28th minute when Danish forward Lucas Andersen slotted home the rebound after APOEL goalkeeper Urko Pardo had parried a close-range effort from Lasse Schöne. However, Ajax lead did not last long. Brazilian forward Gustavo Manduca leveled from the penalty spot three minutes later, after Ajax defender Ricardo van Rhijn was judged to have handled inside the box when Efstathios Aloneftis tried to lift the ball over him. After the equaliser the match could have swung either way as both teams had their fair share of chances to grab all three points. On 21 October 2014, despite another excellent display against one of the continent's strongest sides, APOEL were left bitterly disappointed as they went down to a 0–1 home defeat at the hands of Paris Saint-Germain following a late Edinson Cavani goal, just three minutes before the end. APOEL more than held their own against the riches of talent that their opponents possessed and had the clearer chances of the two sides to win the match but Cavani's clever finish on 87 minutes inflicted a cruel defeat on the Cypriots, making qualification to the next round of the Champions League highly unlikely. On 5 November 2014, APOEL fell to a 1–0 defeat against Paris Saint-Germain at Parc des Princes, as Edinson Cavani was again the difference between the two teams, scoring the only goal of the match after just 56 seconds. The defeat mathematically ruled out APOEL's chances of progressing to the knockout stages of the competition, but the battle for third place was very much on. On 25 November 2014, Barcelona proved too much for APOEL as the Catalan giants cruised to a 4–0 win in a night that belonged to Lionel Messi as his hat-trick in Nicosia made him the UEFA Champions League's all-time top scorer on 74 goals. Luis Suárez put Barça ahead after 27 minutes with his first goal for the club, before Lionel Messi took centre-stage with a hat-trick, all with his less-favoured right foot. Both teams ended the match with ten players as Rafinha and João Guilherme were sent off in the second half. Despite the result, Ajax's 3–1 defeat against Paris Saint-Germain maintained APOEL one point behind the Dutch champions, giving them the chance to win their final group game in Amsterdam Arena and qualify for the knockout phase of the UEFA Europa League. On 10 December 2014, APOEL suffered a 4–0 defeat to Ajax at Amsterdam Arena in the battle for third place and were sent out of European competitions. Ajax failed to find a way through the well-drilled APOEL rearguard until the very last kick of the first half, when Lasse Schöne converted a penalty after Arkadiusz Milik was tripped in the box by Marios Antoniades. Schöne scored his second goal just after the restart and Davy Klaassen headed the third after a mazy run by teenage winger Ricardo Kishna in the 53rd minute. Polish striker Arkadiusz Milik made it 4–0 fifteen minutes from time to give Ajax its first Champions League win of the season and a berth in the UEFA Europa League round of 32. At the same time, Barcelona topped Group F by beating Paris Saint-Germain 3–1 and both teams advanced to the knockout phase of the competition, while APOEL finished fourth in Group F with just one point.

== Current squad ==
Last Update: 21 April 2015

Note: Flags indicate national team as defined under FIFA eligibility rules; some limited exceptions apply. Players may hold more than one non-FIFA nationality.

No.	Pos.	Nation	Player
3	DF	BRA	João Guilherme
4	MF	CYP	Kostakis Artymatas
5	DF	BRA	Carlão
6	DF	NOR	John Arne Riise
7	MF	CYP	Georgios Efrem
8	MF	POR	Tiago Gomes
9	FW	IRL	Cillian Sheridan
10	MF	CYP	Constantinos Charalambides (captain)
11	MF	CYP	Nektarios Alexandrou
13	MF	GER	Martin Lanig
14	MF	CYP	Alex Konstantinou
15	DF	CYP	Marios Antoniades
16	MF	BRA	Vinícius
20	FW	CYP	Pieros Sotiriou
21	MF	BRA	Gustavo Manduca (4th captain)
22	GK	GRE	Dionisis Chiotis

No.	Pos.	Nation	Player
25	DF	CYP	Andreas Christofides
26	MF	POR	Nuno Morais (vice-captain)
28	DF	POR	Mário Sérgio
30	MF	ARG	Tomás De Vincenti
31	MF	CYP	Vasilios Papafotis
32	DF	CYP	Andreas Assiotis
34	FW	MKD	Valmir Nafiu
35	MF	CYP	Marios Pechlivanis
40	MF	CYP	Demetris Charalambous
44	DF	CYP	Nicholas Ioannou
46	FW	CYP	Efstathios Aloneftis
73	DF	BRA	Kaká
78	GK	ESP	Urko Pardo
79	FW	ALG	Rafik Djebbour
88	GK	CYP	Tasos Kissas

For recent transfers, see List of Cypriot football transfers summer 2014.
Also, see List of Cypriot football transfers winter 2014–15.

=== Out on loan ===
Note: Flags indicate national team as defined under FIFA eligibility rules; some limited exceptions apply. Players may hold more than one non-FIFA nationality.

No.	Pos.	Nation	Player
95	MF	CYP	Christos Djamas (on loan at Ayia Napa)

Loan deals expire at the end of 2014–15 season

=== International players ===
- (Cyprus) Nektarios Alexandrou
- (Cyprus) Efstathios Aloneftis
- (Cyprus) Marios Antoniades
- (Cyprus) Kostakis Artymatas
- (Cyprus) Constantinos Charalambides
- (Cyprus) Georgios Efrem
- (Cyprus) Nicholas Ioannou
- (Cyprus) Tasos Kissas
- (Cyprus) Pieros Sotiriou

- (North Macedonia) Valmir Nafiu (U-21)
- (Cyprus) Nicholas Ioannou (U-21)
- (Cyprus) Vasilios Papafotis (U-19)
- (Cyprus) Andreas Assiotis (U-19)
- (Cyprus) Demetris Charalambous (U-19)
- (Cyprus) Marios Pechlivanis (U-19)
- (Cyprus) Giorgos Tasouris (U-19)

=== Foreign players ===
EU Nationals

- (Greece) (Europe) Dionisis Chiotis
- (Portugal) (Europe) Nuno Morais
- (Portugal) (Europe) Mário Sérgio
- (Portugal) (Europe) Tiago Gomes
- (Republic of Ireland) (Europe) Cillian Sheridan
- (Germany) (Europe) Martin Lanig
- (Spain) (Belgium) (Europe) Urko Pardo

EU Nationals (Dual citizenship)

- (Brazil) (Italy) (Europe) Gustavo Manduca
- (Argentina) (Italy) (Europe) Tomás De Vincenti
- (Algeria) (France) (Europe) Rafik Djebbour

Non-EU Nationals

- (Brazil) João Guilherme
- (Brazil) Vinícius
- (Brazil) Kaká
- (Brazil) Carlão
- (North Macedonia) Valmir Nafiu
- (Norway) John Arne Riise

=== Squad changes ===
In:

No.	Pos.	Nat.	Name	Age	EU	Moving from	Type	Transfer window	Ends	Transfer fee	Source
25	CB	(Cyprus)	Christofides	21	EU	Alki Larnaca	Loan return →	Summer	2015	—	apoelfc.com.cy
44	CB	(Cyprus)	Ioannou	18	EU	Manchester United U19 (England)	Transfer ✓	Summer	2017	Free	apoelfc.com.cy
14	RW	(Cyprus)	Konstantinou	22	EU	Apollon Limassol	Transfer ✓	Summer	2017	Free	apoelfc.com.cy
7	RM	(Cyprus)	Efrem	24	EU	Omonia Nicosia	Transfer ✓	Summer	2017	Free	apoelfc.com.cy
5	CB	(Brazil)	Carlão	28	Non-EU	Sochaux (France)	Transfer ✓	Summer	2016	Free	apoelfc.com.cy
30	AM	(Argentina)	De Vincenti	25	EU	Olympiacos (Greece)	Transfer ✓	Summer	2017	€500K	apoelfc.com.cy
24	CB	(Greece)	Papazoglou	25	EU	Olympiacos (Greece)	Transfer ✓	Summer	2016	Free	apoelfc.com.cy
79	CF	(Algeria)	Djebbour	30	EU	Nottingham Forest (England)	Transfer ✓	Summer	2015	Free	apoelfc.com.cy
6	LB	(Norway)	Riise	33	EU	Fulham (England)	Transfer ✓	Summer	2016	Free	apoelfc.com.cy
13	DM	(Germany)	Lanig	30	EU	Eintracht Frankfurt (Germany)	Transfer ✓	Winter	2016	€10K	apoelfc.com.cy
34	RW	(North Macedonia)	Nafiu	20	Non-EU	Hamburger SV (Germany)	Transfer ✓	Winter	2019	Free	apoelfc.com.cy

Total expenditure: ▼€510K

Out:

No.	Pos.	Nat.	Name	Age	EU	Moving to	Type	Transfer window	Transfer fee	Source
17	DM	(Cyprus)	Satsias	36	EU	Retirement	Retirement 🔨	Summer	—	apoel.com.cy
30	AM	(Argentina)	De Vincenti	25	EU	Olympiacos (Greece)	Loan return →	Summer	—	apoelfc.com.cy
14	LB	(Greece)	Pipinis	29	EU	AEL Kalloni (Greece)	Contract termination ✗	Summer	Free	apoelfcofficial
27	CB	(Spain)	Borda	29	EU	Muangthong United (Thailand)	End of contract ✗	Summer	Free	apoelfc.com.cy
77	RB	(Cyprus)	Solomou	28	EU	Enosis Neon Paralimni	End of contract ✗	Summer	Free	apoelfc.com.cy
6	CB	(Brazil)	Oliveira	32	Non-EU	Moreirense (Portugal)	End of contract ✗	Summer	Free	apoelfc.com.cy
18	AM	(Tunisia)	Benachour	32	EU	Free agent	End of contract ✗	Summer	Free	apoelfc.com.cy
19	RB	(Cyprus)	Elia	35	EU	Retirement	Retirement 🔨	Summer	—	apoelfc.com.cy
70	CF	(Brazil)	Santin	33	Non-EU	Kalmar FF (Sweden)	Mutual consent ✗	Summer	Free	apoelfc.com.cy
95	DM	(Cyprus)	Djamas	18	EU	Ayia Napa	Loan →	Summer	Free	apoelfc.com.cy
12	RW	(Paraguay)	Adorno	32	EU	Metalurh Donetsk (Ukraine)	Mutual consent ✗	Summer	Free	apoelfc.com.cy
24	CB	(Greece)	Papazoglou	26	EU	Skoda Xanthi (Greece)	Contract termination ✗	Winter	Free	apoelfc.com.cy
21	CF	(Brazil)	Manduca	34	EU	Retirement	Retirement 🔨	Winter	—	cyprusscore.com

Total income: ▲€0

Last updated: 1 February 2015

== Club ==
=== Management ===
Position	Staff
Caretaker coach	(Brazil) Gustavo Manduca
Assistant coach	(Greece) Georgios Kostis (Cyprus) Marinos Satsias
Goalkeeping coach	(Serbia) Dragoslav Jevrić
Fitness coach	(Cyprus) Andreas Neophytou
Opposition scout & analyst	(Greece) Periklis Papapanayis
Team doctor	(Cyprus) Costas Schizas

Last updated: 11 May 2015
Source: apoelfc.com.cy

=== Kit ===
Supplier: Puma
Sponsor(s): MTN, Logicom

Home	Away	Third

Source: apoelfc.com.cy

=== Other information ===
Chairman	(Cyprus) Prodromos Petrides
Ground (capacity and dimensions)	GSP Stadium (22,859 / 105x68 m)

Source: apoelfc.com.cy

== Squad stats ==
				Total						Cypriot First Division					Cypriot Cup					Cypriot Super Cup					UEFA Champions League				
Country	N	P	Name	GS	A	Mins.	Gls.	Y	R	A	Mins.	Gls.	Y	R	A	Mins.	Gls.	Y	R	A	Mins.	Gls.	Y	R	A	Mins.	Gls.	Y	R
(Brazil)	3	CB	João Guilherme	38	41	3532		12	1	26	2188		8		5	450				1	90				9	804		4	1
(Cyprus)	4	DM	Artymatas	8	16	776		3		12	533		3		3	225									1	18			
(Brazil)	5	CB	Carlão	34	35	2762		11	1	20	1533		6	1	4	315		2		1	14				10	900		3	
(Norway)	6	LB	Riise	29	30	2602	6	4		25	2203	4	4		4	350	2								1	49			
(Cyprus)	7	RM	Efrem	26	37	2186	7	4		24	1560	4	3		4	223	3	1		1	45				8	358			
(Portugal)	8	CM	Gomes	25	36	2310	1	2		21	1142	1	1		4	271				1	90		1		10	807			
(Republic of Ireland)	9	CF	Sheridan	26	36	2451	7	1		20	1159	3	1		5	450	1			1	90				10	752	3		
(Cyprus)	10	RM	Charalambides	18	25	1451	3	1		19	1128	3	1		2	115									4	208			
(Cyprus)	11	LM	Alexandrou	12	22	1184	2	5		14	776	2	4		5	249				1	45		1		2	114			
(Paraguay)	12	RW	Adorno		1	11																			1	11			
(Germany)	13	DM	Lanig	17	17	1381	3	6		13	1021	2	5		4	360	1	1											
(Cyprus)	14	RW	Konstantinou	2	3	124				1	3				2	121													
(Cyprus)	15	LB	Antoniades	21	25	1823		6		11	756		2		4	259		1		1	62				9	746		3	
(Brazil)	16	CM	Vinícius	24	28	2145	2	6		16	1166		4		1	5				1	90				10	884	2	2	
(Cyprus)	20	CF	Sotiriou	6	13	532	4			10	404	4			1	89									2	39			
(Brazil)	21	CF	Manduca	14	20	1256	7	1		13	874	6	1												7	382	1		
(Greece)	22	GK	Chiotis	14	16	1325	-15	1		11	990	-13			5	335	-2	1											
(Greece)	23	CB	Papazoglou	8	13	670		4		9	557		4		1	6									3	107			
(Cyprus)	25	CB	Christofides	3	3	234		2		1	79		1		2	155		1											
(Portugal)	26	DM	Morais	44	44	3890	2	9		27	2388	2	7		6	540		1		1	90		1		10	872			
(Portugal)	28	RB	Mário Sérgio	47	48	4227		7		30	2689		6		7	548				1	90				10	900		1	
(Argentina)	30	AM	De Vincenti	31	39	2781	9	9		24	1832	3	7		5	363	3	2		1	90				9	496	3		
(Cyprus)	31	AM	Papafotis	2	6	206				4	115				2	91													
(Cyprus)	32	RB	Assiotis																										
(North Macedonia)	34	RW	Nafiu	5	12	489	1			10	349	1			2	140													
(Cyprus)	35	LW	Pechlivanis		1	32				1	32																		
(Cyprus)	40	CM	Charalambous		1	11									1	11													
(Cyprus)	44	CB	Ioannou	5	7	413				3	128				2	180									2	105			
(Cyprus)	46	LW	Aloneftis	8	25	1051	2	2		15	631	1	1		3	87				1	28				6	305	1	1	
(Brazil)	73	CB	Kaká	19	25	1843		6	2	20	1452		5	2	4	315		1		1	76								
(Spain)	78	GK	Pardo	34	34	2995	-28	3		21	1890	-13	3		3	205									10	900	-15		
(Algeria)	79	CF	Djebbour	28	38	2519	17	4		26	2000	14	4		6	382	3								6	137			
(Cyprus)	88	GK	Kissas	2	2	180	-2								1	90				1	90	-2							
(Cyprus)	96	GK	Tasouris																										

Last updated: 24 May 2015
Source: Match reports in competitive matches
Ordered by start team, game starts and position on pitch (from back right to front left)
0 shown as blank
Country: when 2 flags, 1st flag = country that plays for internationally, 2nd flag = country of birth; N = number on jersey; P = Position; Name = Name on jersey (for more extended name, pause the mouse pointer on the name); GS = Game Started; A = Appearances.

=== Top scorers ===
R	Player	Position	League	Cup	Super Cup	Europe	Total
1	(Algeria) Djebbour	CF	14	3	0	0	17
2	(Argentina) De Vincenti	AM	3	3	0	3	9
3	(Brazil) Manduca	CF	6	0	0	1	7
3	(Cyprus) Efrem	RW	4	3	0	0	7
3	(Republic of Ireland) Sheridan	CF	3	1	0	3	7
6	(Norway) Riise	LB	4	2	0	0	6
7	(Cyprus) Sotiriou	CF	4	0	0	0	4
8	(Cyprus) Charalambides	RM	3	0	0	0	3
8	(Germany) Lanig	DM	2	1	0	0	3
10	(Portugal) Morais	DM	2	0	0	0	2
10	(Cyprus) Alexandrou	LM	2	0	0	0	2
10	(Cyprus) Aloneftis	LW	1	0	0	1	2
10	(Brazil) Vinícius	CM	0	0	0	2	2
14	(Portugal) Gomes	CM	1	0	0	0	1
14	(North Macedonia) Nafiu	RW	1	0	0	0	1
Own goals			2	0	1	0	3
TOTAL			52	13	1	10	76

Last update: 24 May 2015
Source: Match reports in Competitive matches

=== Captains ===
1. (Cyprus) Constantinos Charalambides
2. (Cyprus) Nektarios Alexandrou
3. (Portugal) Nuno Morais
4. (Brazil) Gustavo Manduca

Source: apoelfcofficial

== Pre-season friendlies ==
Kick-off times are in EET.

6 July 2014 Friendly	APOEL (Cyprus)	1–1	(Lithuania) Žalgiris Vilnius	Stadion Miejski, Malbork
18:30 EET	Vinícius 25'	Report	Wilk 15'	Attendance: 400

9 July 2014 Friendly	Lechia Gdańsk (Poland)	1–2	(Cyprus) APOEL	Stadion Miejski Chojniczanka, Chojnice
18:00 EET	Aleksić 80'	Report	Charalambides 8'; Sheridan 53'	Attendance: 600

17 July 2014 Friendly	Arka Gdynia (Poland)	1–2	(Cyprus) APOEL	Arena Mistrzów, Gniewino
18:00 EET	Warcholak 57'	Report	Manduca 34', 44' (pen.)	Attendance: 300

21 July 2014 Friendly	APOEL (Cyprus)	2–0	(Greece) Ergotelis	GSP Stadium, Nicosia
20:30 EET	De Vincenti 5', 38'	Report		Attendance: 6,000; Referee: Christos Nicolaides

24 July 2014 Friendly	Doxa Katokopias (Cyprus)	0–3	(Cyprus) APOEL	Makario Stadium, Nicosia
18:15 EET		Report	Carlão 16'; De Vincenti 60'; Efrem 90'	Attendance: 300; Referee: Marios Tsaggaris

9 August 2014 Friendly	APOEL (Cyprus)	3–1	(Cyprus) Othellos	Archangelos Training Centre, Nicosia
18:30 EET	Kaká 67'; Sotiriou 79' (pen.), 81'	Report	Unknown 76'	Attendance: Behind closed doors Referee: Loizos Panayiotou

16 August 2014 Friendly	APOEL (Cyprus)	2–1	(Cyprus) Ayia Napa	Archangelos Training Centre, Nicosia
18:30 EET	Artymatas 30'; Alexandrou 75'	Report	Marchev 27'	Attendance: Behind closed doors Referee: Christos Nicolaides

22 August 2014 Friendly	APOEL (Cyprus)	1–2	(Cyprus) Othellos	Archangelos Training Centre, Nicosia
18:30 EET	Adorno 49'	Report	Vera 1'; Panayiotou 7' (pen.)	Attendance: Behind closed doors Referee: Kostas Psevdiotis

5 September 2014 Friendly	THOI Lakatamia (Cyprus)	0–5	(Cyprus) APOEL	THOI Lakatamia Stadium, Lakatamia
18:30 EET		Report	Djebbour 11'; Manduca 44'; Charalambous 63'; Morais 75'; Sheridan 87'	Attendance: 350; Referee: Neophytos Neophytou

== Mid-season friendlies ==
Kick-off times are in EET.

24 January 2015 Friendly	Doxa Katokopias (Cyprus)	0–2	(Cyprus) APOEL	Makario Stadium, Nicosia
15:00 EET		Report	Christodoulou 48'; Papafotis 77'	Attendance: 200

10 April 2015 Friendly	Doxa Katokopias (Cyprus)	1–6	(Cyprus) APOEL	Makario Stadium, Nicosia
15:00 EET	Fernandes 64'	Report	Papafotis 16'; Aloneftis 18' (pen.); Christofides 44'; Pechlivanis 46', 55'; Efrem 61' (pen.)	Attendance: 100

== Competitions ==
=== Overall ===
Competition	Started round	Final position / round	First match	Last match
Cypriot First Division	—	Winners	31 August 2014	24 May 2015
UEFA Champions League	Third qualifying round	Group stage	30 July 2014	10 December 2014
Cypriot Cup	2nd round	Winners	14 January 2015	20 May 2015
Cypriot Super Cup	Final	Runners-up	13 August 2014	

Updated to match played 24 May 2015
Source: Competitions

=== Cypriot First Division ===
==== Classification ====
Pos	Team	Pld	W	D	L	GF	GA	GD	Pts	Qualification
1	Apollon Limassol	22	15	3	4	49	26	+23	48	Qualification to championship group
2	APOEL	22	13	7	2	34	13	+21	46	Qualification to championship group
3	Omonia Nicosia	22	12	3	7	32	22	+10	39 (Note: OMO 0–1 AEK; AEK 1–3 OMO)	Qualification to championship group
4	AEK Larnaca	22	11	6	5	41	23	+18	39	Qualification to championship group
5	Anorthosis Famagusta	22	12	2	8	32	22	+10	38	Qualification to championship group

Source: UEFA, CFA
Rules for classification: 1) points; 2) head-to-head points; 3) head-to-head goal difference; 4) head-to-head away goals scored; 5) goal difference; 6) number of goals scored

==== Results summary ====
Overall								Home						Away					
Pld	W	D	L	GF	GA	GD	Pts	W	D	L	GF	GA	GD	W	D	L	GF	GA	GD
32	17	11	4	52	26	+26	62	9	7	0	26	11	+15	8	4	4	26	15	+11

Last updated: 24 May 2015.
Source: UEFA

==== Results by round ====
Round	1	2	3	4	5	6	7	8	9	10	11	12	13	14	15	16	17	18	19	20	21	22	23	24	25	26	27	28	29	30	31	32
Ground	H	A	H	A	H	A	H	A	H	A	H	A	H	A	H	A	H	A	H	A	H	A	H	A	H	A	H	A	H	A	H	A
Result	W	W	W	W	D	W	W	W	D	D	W	W	D	L	D	L	D	W	W	W	W	D	W	D	D	L	W	D	W	L	D	W
Position	2	1	1	1	1	1	1	1	1	1	1	1	1	1	1	2	2	2	2	2	1	2	1	2	2	2	1	1	1	1	1	1

Updated to match(es) played on 24 May 2015. Source: apoelfc.com.cy
A = Away; H = Home; W = Win; D = Draw; L = Loss

=== Play-offs ===
The 12 teams are divided into two groups of six teams. Points are carried over from the regular season.

==== Championship group ====
Pos	Team	Pld	W	D	L	GF	GA	GD	Pts	Qualification
1	APOEL (C)	32	17	11	4	52	26	+26	62	Qualification to Champions League second qualifying round
2	AEK Larnaca	32	17	8	7	56	31	+25	59 (Note: AEK: 9 pts; APOL: 3 pts)	Qualification to Europa League third qualifying round (Note: Since Cypriot cup winners APOEL qualified for the 2015–16 UEFA Champions League, the fourth placed team would also qualify for the first qualifying round of the 2015–16 UEFA Europa League.)
3	Apollon Limassol	32	18	5	9	59	41	+18	59	Qualification to Europa League first qualifying round
4	Omonia Nicosia	32	17	5	10	52	34	+18	56	Qualification to Europa League first qualifying round
5	Anorthosis Famagusta	32	16	4	12	50	37	+13	52	
6	Ermis Aradippou	32	11	7	14	38	55	−17	40	

Source: CFA, UEFA
Rules for classification: 1) points; 2) head-to-head points; 3) head-to-head goal difference; 4) head-to-head goals scored; 5) goal difference; 6) number of goals scored.
(C) Champions

=== Matches ===
Kick-off times are in EET.

==== Regular season ====
24 September 2014 (Note: The match between APOEL and Anorthosis was originally scheduled on 23 August 2014, but was postponed and rescheduled to a later date because of APOEL's UEFA Champions League play-off matches against Aalborg BK.) Matchweek 1	APOEL	2–0	Anorthosis	GSP Stadium, Nicosia
19:00 EET	Manduca 65'; Aloneftis 76'	Report 1 Report 2	Laifis (red card) 74'	Attendance: 8,707; Referee: Demetris Masias

31 August 2014 Matchweek 2	AEK Larnaca	0–2	APOEL	GSZ Stadium, Larnaca
19:00 EET		Report 1 Report 2	Manduca 58', 90+2'	Attendance: 2,643; Referee: Leontios Trattos

13 September 2014 Matchweek 3	APOEL	1–0	Ermis Aradippou	GSP Stadium, Nicosia
19:00 EET	Sheridan 88'	Report 1 Report 2		Attendance: 5,664; Referee: Giorgos Nicolaou

20 September 2014 Matchweek 4	Ayia Napa	1–3	APOEL	Tasos Markou Stadium, Paralimni
19:00 EET	Panayotov 63'; Kolokoudias (penalty missed) 40'	Report 1 Report 2	Charalambides 10'; Sotiriou 12'; Manduca 36'; Kaká (red card) 39'	Attendance: 1,100; Referee: Vasilis Demetriou

27 September 2014 Matchweek 5	APOEL	0–0	AEL Limassol	GSP Stadium, Nicosia
18:00 EET		Report 1 Report 2		Attendance: 6,221; Referee: Leontios Trattos

6 October 2014 Matchweek 6	Othellos Athienou	1–2	APOEL	Antonis Papadopoulos Stadium, Larnaca
18:30 EET	Thiago 54'	Report 1 Report 2	Manduca 65'; Djebbour 85'	Attendance: 1,000; Referee: Ioannis Anastasiou

26 October 2014 Matchweek 7	APOEL	1–0	Nea Salamina	GSP Stadium, Nicosia
19:00 EET	Djebbour 26'	Report 1 Report 2		Attendance: 5,379; Referee: Kostas Psevdiotis

1 November 2014 Matchweek 8	Ethnikos Achna	0–4	APOEL	Dasaki Stadium, Achna
19:00 EET		Report 1 Report 2	Sheridan 7', 55'; Alexandrou 70'; Manduca 85'	Attendance: 800; Referee: Leontios Trattos

10 November 2014 Matchweek 9	APOEL	0–0	Doxa Katokopias	GSP Stadium, Nicosia
18:00 EET		Report 1 Report 2		Attendance: 3,157; Referee: Antonis Christodoulou

21 November 2014 Matchweek 10	Apollon Limassol	0–0	APOEL	Tsirion Stadium, Limassol
19:00 EET		Report 1 Report 2		Attendance: 5,175; Referee: Marios Tsaggaris

30 November 2014 Matchweek 11	APOEL	1–0	Omonia	GSP Stadium, Nicosia
16:00 EET	Efrem 38'	Report 1 Report 2	Kyriakou (yellow card) 72' (yellow-red card)	Attendance: 9,631; Referee: Demetris Masias

5 December 2014 Matchweek 12	Anorthosis	0–1	APOEL	Antonis Papadopoulos Stadium, Larnaca
19:00 EET		Report 1 Report 2	Djebbour 81'	Attendance: 5,497; Referee: Leontios Trattos

15 December 2014 Matchweek 13	APOEL	4–4	AEK Larnaca	GSP Stadium, Nicosia
19:00 EET	Djebbour 17', 46'; Sotiriou 85', 90'	Report 1 Report 2	Englezou 13'; Kanté 20', 55'; Larena 45+2'	Attendance: 4,616; Referee: Christos Nicolaides

20 December 2014 Matchweek 14	Ermis Aradippou	2–1	APOEL	Dasaki Stadium, Achna
17:00 EET	Onyilo 48', 90+2'	Report 1 Report 2	Sotiriou 6'	Attendance: 1,037; Referee: Thomas Mouskos

5 January 2015 Matchweek 15	APOEL	1–1	Ayia Napa	GSP Stadium, Nicosia
19:00 EET	Efrem 60'	Report 1 Report 2	Kolokoudias 90+1'	Attendance: 1,592; Referee: Kostas Psevdiotis

11 January 2015 Matchweek 16	AEL Limassol	2–1	APOEL	Tsirion Stadium, Limassol
15:00 EET	Riise 12'	Report 1 Report 2	Tagbajumi 66' (pen.), 73'	Attendance: 6,000; Referee: Demetris Masias

17 January 2015 Matchweek 17	APOEL	1–1	Othellos Athienou	GSP Stadium, Nicosia
19:00 EET	Djebbour 58'	Report 1 Report 2	Grigalashvili 50'	Attendance: 2,245; Referee: Avraam Tsoukkas

31 January 2015 (Note: The match between Nea Salamina and APOEL was originally scheduled on 24 January 2015, but was postponed and rescheduled to a later date because of Cyprus Referees' Association strike.) Matchweek 18	Nea Salamina	0–1	APOEL	Ammochostos Stadium, Larnaca
17:00 EET		Report 1 Report 2	Djebbour 5'	Attendance: 2,500; Referee: Kostas Psevdiotis

7 February 2015 (Note: The match between APOEL and Ethnikos was originally scheduled on 31 January 2015, but was postponed and rescheduled to a later date because of Cyprus Referees' Association strike.) Matchweek 19	APOEL	4–0	Ethnikos Achna	GSP Stadium, Nicosia
17:00 EET	Lanig 19'; Riise 48'; Efrem 73'; Djebbour 75'	Report 1 Report 2		Attendance: 1,139; Referee: Antonis Christodoulou

14 February 2015 Matchweek 20	Doxa Katokopias	0–2	APOEL	Makario Stadium, Nicosia
17:00 EET		Report 1 Report 2	Riise 4'; Leonardo 46' (o.g.)	Attendance: 727; Referee: Demetris Masias

21 February 2015 Matchweek 21	APOEL	1–0	Apollon Limassol	GSP Stadium, Nicosia
16:00 EET	Kaká (red card) 71'; Morais 90+3'	Report 1 Report 2		Attendance: 4,783 (Note: The match was played behind closed doors due to APOEL's punishment for the incidents in the match against AEL Limassol on 11 January 2015. Only children up to 12 years who were accompanied by their mothers and people beyond 65 years were allowed to attend the match.); Referee: Leontios Trattos

28 February 2015 Matchweek 22	Omonia	1–1	APOEL	GSP Stadium, Nicosia
16:00 EET	Fofana 82'	Report 1 Report 2	Morais 31'	Attendance: 13,121; Referee: Leontios Trattos

==== Play-offs ====
7 March 2015 Matchweek 1	APOEL	1–0	Anorthosis	GSP Stadium, Nicosia
16:00 EET	Riise 33'	Report 1 Report 2	Maisuradze (yellow card) 83' (yellow-red card)	Attendance: 8,663; Referee: Ioannis Anastasiou

14 March 2015 Matchweek 2	Omonia	1–1	APOEL	GSP Stadium, Nicosia
16:00 EET	Schembri 6'	Report 1 Report 2	Djebbour 37'	Attendance: 9,893; Referee: Christos Nicolaides

21 March 2015 Matchweek 3	APOEL	2–2	Apollon Limassol	GSP Stadium, Nicosia
16:00 EET	Gomes 9'; Nafiu 35'	Report 1 Report 2	Sangoy 29' (pen.); Papoulis 39'	Attendance: 12,735; Referee: Vasilis Demetriou

4 April 2015 Matchweek 4	AEK Larnaca	1–0	APOEL	GSZ Stadium, Larnaca
16:00 EET	Mitidis 39'	Report 1 Report 2	Carlão (yellow card) 58' (yellow-red card)	Attendance: 4,284; Referee: Demetris Masias

19 April 2015 Matchweek 5	APOEL	3–0	Ermis Aradippou	GSP Stadium, Nicosia
16:30 EET	Lanig 24'; Djebbour 37', 47'	Report 1 Report 2		Attendance: 7,958; Referee: Antonis Christodoulou

25 April 2015 Matchweek 6	Anorthosis	3–3	APOEL	Antonis Papadopoulos Stadium, Larnaca
17:00 EET	Gonçalves 4', 31'; Makris 52'	Report 1 Report 2	Charalambides 17'; Efrem 48'; Demetriou 89' (o.g.)	Attendance: 4,320; Referee: Demetris Masias

2 May 2015 Matchweek 7	APOEL	3–2	Omonia	GSP Stadium, Nicosia
17:00 EET	De Vincenti 37' (pen.); Alexandrou 59'; Djebbour 90+4'	Report 1 Report 2	Lobjanidze (yellow card) 23' (yellow-red card); Assis 54', 56'	Attendance: 12,187; Referee: Antonis Christodoulou

10 May 2015 Matchweek 8	Apollon Limassol	1–0	APOEL	Tsirion Stadium, Limassol
17:00 EET	Papoulis 66'; López (yellow card) 90+4' (yellow-red card)	Report 1 Report 2		Attendance: 2,930; Referee: Leontios Trattos

16 May 2015 Matchweek 9	APOEL	1–1	AEK Larnaca	GSP Stadium, Nicosia
17:00 EET	De Vincenti 24' (pen.)	Report 1 Report 2	Boljević 12' (pen.)	Attendance: 15,562; Referee: Leontios Trattos

24 May 2015 Matchweek 10	Ermis Aradippou	2–4	APOEL	Ammochostos Stadium, Larnaca
17:00 EET	Taralidis 15'; Papathanasiou 53'	Report 1 Report 2	De Vincenti 5'; Charalambides 8'; Djebbour 18' (pen.), 39'	Attendance: 1,194; Referee: Christos Nicolaides

=== UEFA Champions League ===
==== Qualifying phase ====
===== Third qualifying round =====
30 July 2014 First Leg	HJK Helsinki (Finland)	2–2	(Cyprus) APOEL	Sonera Stadium, Helsinki
18:00 CET	Savage 11', 45' (pen.); Kandji (yellow card) 48' (yellow-red card)	Report 1 Report 2	De Vincenti 71'; Sheridan 74'	Attendance: 10,189; Referee: (Poland) Paweł Gil

6 August 2014 Second Leg	APOEL (Cyprus)	2–0 (4–2 agg.)	(Finland) HJK Helsinki	GSP Stadium, Nicosia
18:30 CET	Sheridan 17'; De Vincenti 43' (pen.)	Report 1 Report 2		Attendance: 14,271; Referee: (Israel) Liran Liany

===== Play-off round =====
20 August 2014 First Leg	Aalborg BK (Denmark)	1–1	(Cyprus) APOEL	Nordjyske Arena, Aalborg
20:45 CET	Thomsen 16'	Report 1 Report 2	Vinícius 54'	Attendance: 9,663; Referee: (England) Martin Atkinson

26 August 2014 Second Leg	APOEL (Cyprus)	4–0 (5–1 agg.)	(Denmark) Aalborg BK	GSP Stadium, Nicosia
20:45 CET	Vinícius 29'; De Vincenti 44'; Aloneftis 64'; Sheridan 75'	Report 1 Report 2		Attendance: 18,746; Referee: (Scotland) William Collum

==== Group stage ====
===== Group F standings and fixtures =====
Pos	Team	Pld	W	D	L	GF	GA	GD	Pts	Qualification	BAR	PAR	AJX	APO
1	(Spain) Barcelona	6	5	0	1	15	5	+10	15	Advance to knockout phase	—	3–1	3–1	1–0
2	(France) Paris Saint-Germain	6	4	1	1	10	7	+3	13	Advance to knockout phase	3–2	—	3–1	1–0
3	(Netherlands) Ajax	6	1	2	3	8	10	−2	5	Transfer to Europa League	0–2	1–1	—	4–0
4	(Cyprus) APOEL	6	0	1	5	1	12	−11	1		0–4	0–1	1–1	—

Source: UEFA
Rules for classification: Group stage tiebreakers

===== Matches =====
17 September 2014 Matchweek 1	Barcelona (Spain)	1–0	(Cyprus) APOEL	Camp Nou, Barcelona
20:45 CET	Piqué 28'	Report 1 Report 2		Attendance: 62,832; Referee: (Germany) Deniz Aytekin

30 September 2014 Matchweek 2	APOEL (Cyprus)	1–1	(Netherlands) Ajax	GSP Stadium, Nicosia
20:45 CET	Manduca 31' (pen.)	Report 1 Report 2	Andersen 28'	Attendance: 17,190; Referee: (Serbia) Milorad Mažić

21 October 2014 Matchweek 3	APOEL (Cyprus)	0–1	(France) Paris Saint-Germain	GSP Stadium, Nicosia
20:45 CET		Report 1 Report 2	Cavani 87'	Attendance: 18,659; Referee: (Romania) Ovidiu Hațegan

5 November 2014 Matchweek 4	Paris Saint-Germain (France)	1–0	(Cyprus) APOEL	Parc des Princes, Paris
20:45 CET	Cavani 1'	Report 1 Report 2		Attendance: 45,816; Referee: (Portugal) Olegário Benquerença

25 November 2014 Matchweek 5	APOEL (Cyprus)	0–4	(Spain) Barcelona	GSP Stadium, Nicosia
20:45 CET	João Guilherme (yellow card) 84' (yellow-red card)	Report 1 Report 2	Suárez 27'; Messi 38', 58', 87'; Rafinha (yellow card) 70' (yellow-red card)	Attendance: 20,626; Referee: (Italy) Gianluca Rocchi

10 December 2014 Matchweek 6	Ajax (Netherlands)	4–0	(Cyprus) APOEL	Amsterdam ArenA, Amsterdam
20:45 CET	Schöne 45+1' (pen.), 50'; Klaassen 53'; Milik 74'	Report 1 Report 2		Attendance: 51,796; Referee: (Spain) Carlos Velasco Carballo

=== Cypriot Super Cup ===
13 August 2014 Final	APOEL	1–2	Ermis Aradippou	Antonis Papadopoulos Stadium, Larnaca
20:00 EET	Žarković 90+2' (o.g.)	Report 1 Report 2	Belusso 1'; Taralidis 90+5'	Attendance: 2,000; Referee: Marios Tsaggaris

=== Cypriot Cup ===
==== Second round ====
14 January 2015 First Leg	Olympiakos Nicosia	0–1	APOEL	Makario Stadium, Nicosia
15:00 EET		Report 1 Report 2	Djebbour 73' (pen.)	Attendance: 250; Referee: Christos Elia

28 January 2015 (Note: The match between APOEL and Olympiakos was originally scheduled on 21 January 2015, but was postponed and rescheduled to a later date because of Cyprus Referees' Association strike.) Second Leg	APOEL	3–0 (4–0 agg.)	Olympiakos Nicosia	GSP Stadium, Nicosia
19:00 EET	De Vincenti 19'; Sheridan 68'; Efrem 82'	Report 1 Report 2		Attendance: 2,183; Referee: Georgios Constantinou

==== Quarter-finals ====
4 March 2015 First Leg	Anorthosis	0–0	APOEL	Antonis Papadopoulos Stadium, Larnaca
17:30 EET		Report 1 Report 2		Attendance: 5,000; Referee: Vasilis Demetriou

11 March 2015 Second Leg	APOEL	2–0 (2–0 agg.)	Anorthosis	GSP Stadium, Nicosia
17:30 EET	Djebbour 67', 80'	Report 1 Report 2		Attendance: 5,244; Referee: Leontios Trattos

==== Semi-finals ====
8 April 2015 First Leg	APOEL	3–0	Omonia	GSP Stadium, Nicosia
17:00 EET	Lanig 36'; Riise 39'; De Vincenti 78'	Report 1 Report 2		Attendance: 9,188; Referee: Charalambos Skapoullis

22 April 2015 Second Leg	Omonia	0–0 (0–3 agg.)	APOEL	GSP Stadium, Nicosia
17:00 EET	Fofana (yellow card) (yellow-red card) 90+4'	Report 1 Report 2		Attendance: 4,206; Referee: Leontios Trattos

==== Final ====
20 May 2015 Final	APOEL	4–2	AEL Limassol	GSZ Stadium, Larnaca
19:00 EET	De Vincenti 31'; Efrem 45', 53'; Riise 60'	(Report 1) (Report 2)	Sema 11'; Sielis 90'	Attendance: 10,177; Referee: (Czech Republic) Pavel Královec

APOEL won the 2014–15 Cypriot Cup (21st title).
