= 2011–12 APOEL FC season =

APOEL
2011–12 season
- Chairman: Phivos Erotokritou
- Manager: Ivan Jovanović
- Stadium: GSP Stadium, Nicosia
- Cypriot First Division: 2nd
- Cypriot Cup: 2nd round
- LTV Super Cup: Winners
- Champions League: Quarter-finals
- Top goalscorer: League: Esteban Solari (11); All: Esteban Solari (13)
- Highest home attendance: 22,701 vs Olympique Lyonnais (7 March 2012)
- Lowest home attendance: 1,837 vs Akritas Chlorakas (11 January 2012)
- Average home league attendance: 12,126 (all competitions)
Home colours	Away colours	Third colours

The 2011–12 season was APOEL's 72nd season in the Cypriot First Division and 84th year in existence as a football club.

== Season review ==
=== Pre-season and friendlies ===
The first training session for the season took place on 8 June 2011 at GSP Stadium. On 19 June 2011, the team flew to Obertraun in Austria to perform the main stage of their pre-season training. APOEL returned to Cyprus on 2 July 2011. During the pre-season training stage in Austria, APOEL participated in Salzburg Airport Cup and played in total four friendly matches.

=== Domestic Competitions ===
==== Laiki Bank League ====
APOEL completed the regular season of the 2011–12 Cypriot First Division having 17 wins, 5 draws and 4 losses, scoring 39 goals and conceding 13 goals. So, APOEL entered championship play-offs from the third place with 56 points, four points behind leaders AEL Limassol (60 points) and one point behind second placed Omonia (57 points).

In the first championship play-off match, APOEL won Omonia by 2–1, with a last-minute winner from Gustavo Manduca and moved up to the second place, only two points behind leaders AEL Limassol who on the same day drew 1–1 at Anorthosis. In the second play-off match, APOEL suffered a 2–1 home loss from Anorthosis and leaders AEL Limassol (who at the same day won Omonia by 2–0) gained a five-points advantage. In the next play-off match, Ivan Tričkovski's last-minute winner helped APOEL beat AEL Limassol 1–0 at home, to reduce AEL's lead to just two points. Another match between AEL Limassol and APOEL followed one week later, but the two teams drew 0–0 in Limassol and AEL remained two points clear of APOEL, with only two matches remaining. On 5 May 2012, APOEL lost from Omonia at home by 2–1 and at the same day AEL Limassol crowned champions by beating Anorthosis 1–0 at Limassol. In the last match of the season, APOEL won Anorthosis at Larnaca by 2–1 and secured the second place in the league.

==== LTV Super Cup ====
On 7 August 2011, APOEL won the 2011 Cypriot Super Cup by beating Omonia 1–0 in the GSP Stadium. The winner came from Christos Kontis in the 81st minute.

==== Cypriot Cup ====
In the first round of the 2011–12 Cypriot Cup, APOEL eliminated Akritas Chlorakas by winning 9–1 in a knock-out match which was held at GSP Stadium. In the last 16 of the Cup, APOEL faced up AEL Limassol in a two-legged tie and lost 0–1 on aggregate. In the first match at GSP Stadium, APOEL lost 0–1 from a Patrick Vouho's goal in the 40th minute. On the return leg, APOEL was held to a 0–0 draw, and so eliminated very early from the competition.

=== UEFA Champions League ===
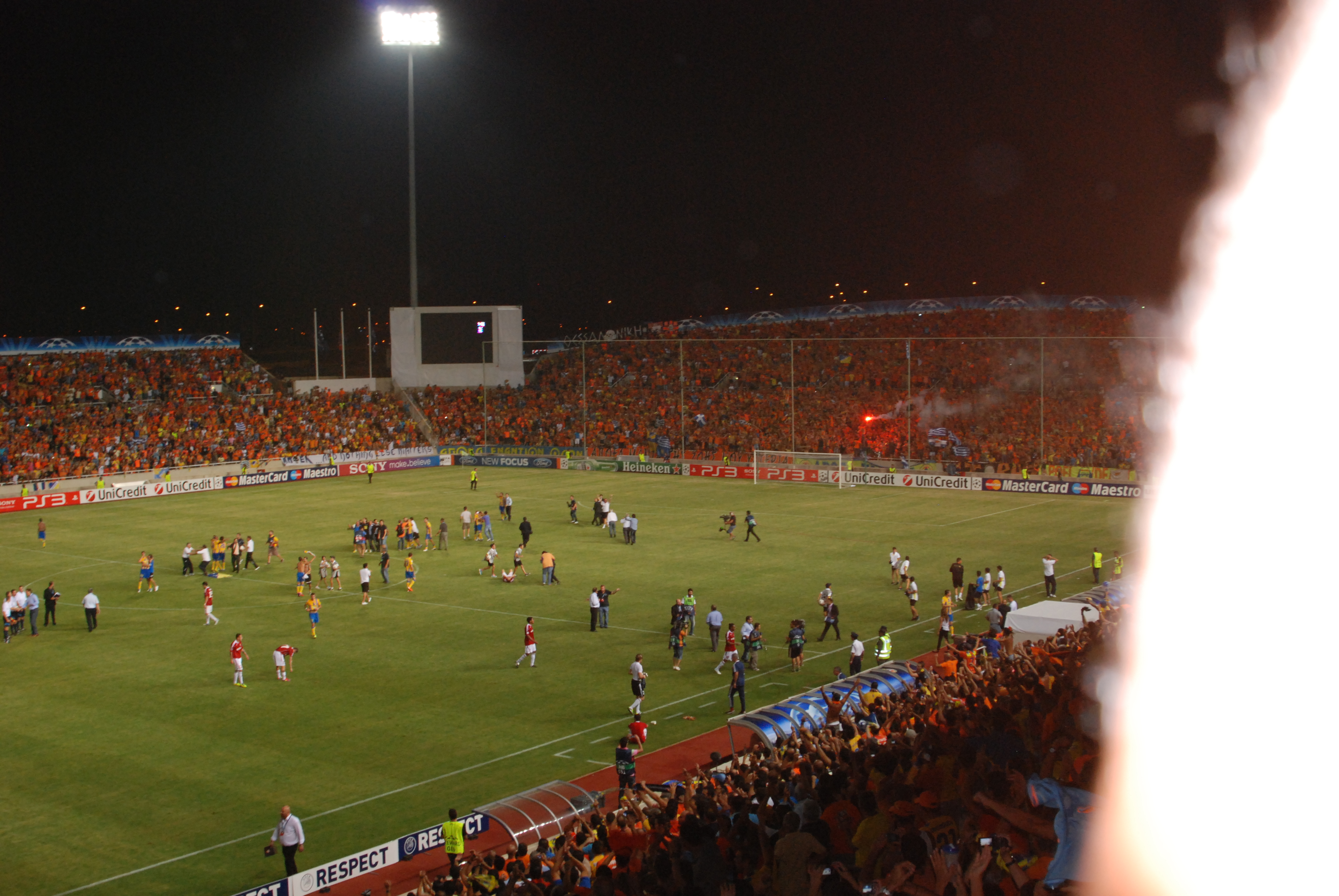
APOEL fans celebrating at GSP Stadium after eliminating Wisła Kraków in the play-off round of the 2011–12 UEFA Champions League.

The team won the Cypriot championship last season and as such entered the 2011–12 UEFA Champions League second qualifying round. A successful campaign saw them through to the 2011–12 UEFA Champions League group stages by eliminating Skënderbeu Korçë (6–0 agg.), Slovan Bratislava (2–0 agg.) and Wisła Kraków (3–2 agg.). APOEL drawn in Group G, alongside F.C. Porto, Shakhtar Donetsk and Zenit St. Petersburg.

On 13 September 2011, APOEL hosted Zenit St. Petersburg in GSP Stadium and secured its first ever victory in the UEFA Champions League group stage proper with a 2–1 comeback victory against the Russian side. Konstantin Zyryanov put Zenit ahead in the 63rd minute but APOEL was rewarded for its attacking play 10 minutes later when Gustavo Manduca pounced on a loose ball in the box and slotted the ball into the Zenit net. The winner came two minutes later when Brazilian striker Aílton evaded the Zenit defense and shot into the far corner past goalkeeper Vyacheslav Malafeev. In its second match in the group, APOEL held Shakhtar Donetsk to a 1–1 draw at the Donbas Arena and stayed in first place in the group. APOEL took the lead when the striker Ivan Tričkovski finished off a counterattack in the 61st minute. Shakhtar equalised three minutes later when Jádson scored. Another away match followed against F.C. Porto and APOEL drew 1–1 at Dragão to extend its unbeaten start and keep them on the top of Group G. Brazilian forward Hulk put F.C. Porto ahead after 13 minutes with a curving free-kick from distance and APOEL levelled six minutes later when Aílton received the ball close to the Porto area, dribbled past Fernando and sent a diagonal shot that gave the goalkeeper Helton no chance to block. However, on the last minute of added time APOEL could have won the match, but substitute Aldo Adorno was denied the winner by a block from Helton. On 1 November 2011, APOEL hosted F.C. Porto in GSP Stadium and Gustavo Manduca's last-minute winner meant APOEL remained unbeaten at the top of Group G, securing at least a place in the 2011–12 UEFA Europa League knockout phase. On 42nd minute, Aílton was tripped by Eliaquim Mangala and the referee immediately signaled a penalty. The Brazilian striker stepped up and sent Helton the wrong way, scoring his third goal in the competition. On the 89th minute F.C. Porto won a penalty and Hulk made no mistake from the spot, equalizing for the visitors. It looked like the Portuguese side had salvaged a draw, but in the 90th minute Constantinos Charalambides fired in an accurate cross and found Gustavo Manduca in the box, whose left-footed strike from close range sealed the win for APOEL.

APOEL's 2011–12 UEFA Champions League starting lineup that managed to beat Lyon 1–0 (4–3 pen.) at home and reached the quarter-finals.

On 23 November 2011, APOEL made history and became the first Cypriot team to reach the last 16 of the UEFA Champions League by holding Zenit St. Petersburg to a 0–0 draw in Petrovsky Stadium. APOEL eventually reached the last 16 as a group winner, despite losing its unbeaten record after a 0–2 home defeat by Shakhtar Donetsk on the final match day. Luiz Adriano (who had in the first half a penalty saved by Urko Pardo) and Yevhen Seleznyov scored second-half goals for Shakhtar to win its first group stage match that season, but APOEL stayed top of Group G after Zenit St. Petersburg drew 0–0 at F.C. Porto.

In its first participation to the UEFA Champions League last 16, APOEL drawn against French side Olympique Lyonnais. The first leg was held at Stade de Gerland on 14 February 2012, in front of over 5,000 travelling APOEL supporters. Lyon overcame APOEL's tight defense with a second-half goal by Alexandre Lacazette and secured a slender advantage by winning 1–0. In the second leg which was held at GSP Stadium on 7 March 2012, Gustavo Manduca's ninth-minute opener levelled the tie 1–1 on aggregate. After 90 minutes and 30 minutes of extra time the game remained 1–0 for APOEL and went to a penalty shoot-out. On the penalty shoot-out, Dionisis Chiotis made two saves by diving to his left to block penalties from Alexandre Lacazette and Michel Bastos, while APOEL converted all four of its own spot kicks and won 4–3, reaching the UEFA Champions League quarter-finals for the first time.

APOEL has been drawn to face Spanish giants Real Madrid in the quarter-finals. In the first leg which was held at GSP Stadium on 27 March 2012, APOEL stood well for 74 minutes, but Real Madrid ran out 3–0 winners thanks to late goals from Karim Benzema (74', 90') and Kaká (82'). In the return leg which was held at Santiago Bernabéu on 4 April 2012, Real Madrid took a 2–0 lead in the first half by Cristiano Ronaldo's (26') and Kaká's (37') goals. Gustavo Manduca scored a goal for APOEL in the 67th minute after an excellent through ball from Aílton, but Ronaldo scored his second goal with a free-kick in the 75th minute to make it 3–1 for Real Madrid. Substitute José Callejón scored in the 80th minute but two minutes later APOEL won a penalty after Hamit Altıntop brought down Aldo Adorno and Esteban Solari beat Iker Casillas from the spot to make it 4–2. Finally, another goal scored by Ángel Di María in the 84th minute and Real Madrid won by 5–2, reaching the semi-finals with an aggregate score of 8–2 and giving an end to APOEL's impressive run in the competition.

== Current squad ==
Last Update: 19 January 2012

Note: Flags indicate national team as defined under FIFA eligibility rules; some limited exceptions apply. Players may hold more than one non-FIFA nationality.

No.	Pos.	Nation	Player
1	GK	(Cyprus) CYP	Panos Constantinou
3	DF	(Portugal) POR	Paulo Jorge
4	DF	(Brazil) BRA	Kaká (on loan from Hertha BSC)
5	MF	(Bosnia and Herzegovina) BIH	Sanel Jahić
6	DF	(Brazil) BRA	Marcelo Oliveira
7	MF	(Greece) GRE	Savvas Poursaitides
8	FW	(Brazil) BRA	Aílton
9	FW	(Argentina) ARG	Esteban Solari
10	MF	(Cyprus) CYP	Constantinos Charalambides (vice-captain)
11	FW	(North Macedonia) MKD	Ivan Tričkovski
14	MF	(Tunisia) TUN	Tijani Belaïd
15	DF	(Cyprus) CYP	Marios Antoniades
17	MF	(Cyprus) CYP	Marinos Satsias (captain)

No.	Pos.	Nation	Player
19	DF	(Cyprus) CYP	Marios Elia
20	MF	(Paraguay) PAR	Aldo Adorno
21	MF	(Brazil) BRA	Gustavo Manduca
22	GK	(Greece) GRE	Dionisis Chiotis
23	MF	(Portugal) POR	Hélio Pinto
25	DF	(Cyprus) CYP	Andreas Christofides
26	MF	(Portugal) POR	Nuno Morais
29	FW	(Cyprus) CYP	Nektarios Alexandrou
31	MF	(Portugal) POR	Hélder Sousa
77	DF	(Cyprus) CYP	Athos Solomou
78	GK	(Spain) ESP	Urko Pardo
81	MF	(Brazil) BRA	Marcinho
88	GK	(Cyprus) CYP	Tasos Kissas
98	DF	(Brazil) BRA	William Boaventura

For recent transfers, see List of Cypriot football transfers summer 2011.
Also, see List of Cypriot football transfers winter 2011–12.

=== International players ===
- (Greece) Dionisis Chiotis
- (North Macedonia) Ivan Tričkovski
- (Cyprus) Nektarios Alexandrou
- (Cyprus) Constantinos Charalambides
- (Cyprus) Marios Elia
- (Cyprus) Tasos Kissas
- (Cyprus) Savvas Poursaitides
- (Cyprus) Marinos Satsias
- (Cyprus) Athos Solomou
- (Cyprus) Marios Antoniades (U-21)
- (Cyprus) Andreas Christofides (U-21)
- (Cyprus) Emilios Panayiotou (U-21)

=== Foreign players ===
EU Nationals

- (Portugal) Paulo Jorge
- (Portugal) Nuno Morais
- (Portugal) (Cyprus) Hélio Pinto
- (Portugal) Hélder Sousa
- (Greece) Dionisis Chiotis
- (Greece) (Cyprus) Savvas Poursaitides
- (Spain) (Belgium) Urko Pardo

EU Nationals (Dual citizenship)

- (Argentina) (Italy) Esteban Solari
- (Brazil) (Italy) Gustavo Manduca
- (Brazil) (Portugal) Marcinho
- (Paraguay) (Spain) Aldo Adorno

Non-EU Nationals

- (Brazil) Aílton
- (Brazil) William Boaventura
- (Brazil) Kaká
- (Brazil) Marcelo Oliveira
- (North Macedonia) Ivan Tričkovski

=== Squad changes ===
In:

No.	Pos.	Nat.	Name	Age	EU	Moving from	Type	Transfer window	Ends	Transfer fee	Source
20	RW	(Paraguay)	Adorno	29	EU	Apollon Limassol	Transfer ✓	Summer	2013	Free	apoelfc.com.cy
6	CB	(Brazil)	Oliveira	29	Non-EU	Atromitos (Greece)	Transfer ✓	Summer	2013	Free	apoelfc.com.cy
5	DM	(Bosnia and Herzegovina)	Jahić	29	EU	AEK Athens (Greece)	Transfer ✓	Summer	2013	Free	apoelfc.com.cy
78	GK	(Spain)	Pardo	28	EU	Rapid București (Romania)	Transfer ✓	Summer	2013	Free	sigmalive.com
4	CB	(Brazil)	Kaká	30	Non-EU	Hertha BSC (Germany)	Loan →	Summer	2012	€250K	herthabsc.de
14	AM	(Tunisia)	Belaid	23	EU	Hull City (England)	Transfer ✓	Summer	2013	Free	sigmalive.com
31	AM	(Portugal)	Hélder Sousa	34	EU	Olympiakos Nicosia	Transfer ✓	Winter	2013	€90K	apoelfc.com.cy

Total expenditure: ▼€340K

Out:

No.	Pos.	Nat.	Name	Age	EU	Moving to	Type	Transfer window	Transfer fee	Source
8	CF	(Poland)	Sikora	31	EU	Podbeskidzie Bielsko-Biała (Poland)	End of contract ✗	Summer	Free	ts.podbeskidzie.pl
60	GK	(Cyprus)	Ioannou	20	EU	Doxa Katokopias	Mutual consent ✗	Summer	Free	kerkida.net
14	CB	(Netherlands)	Broerse	32	EU	Excelsior (Netherlands)	End of contract ✗	Summer	Free	joostbroerse.nl
30	CF	(Serbia)	Mirosavljević	33	Non-EU	Olympiakos Nicosia	End of contract ✗	Summer	Free	olympiakos.com.cy
33	DM	(Cyprus)	Michael	34	EU	Enosis Neon Paralimni	End of contract ✗	Summer	Free	enpfc.com
5	CB	(North Macedonia)	Grnčarov	28	Non-EU	Lierse (Belgium)	End of contract ✗	Summer	Free	lierse.com
6	DM	(Cyprus)	Kyriakou	24	EU	Anagennisi Deryneia	End of contract ✗	Summer	Free	anagennisis1920.net
18	LW	(Cyprus)	Vasiliou	20	EU	Doxa Katokopias	Loan →	Summer	Free	—
24	CB	(Greece)	Kontis	36	EU	Retirement	Retirement	Summer	—	apoel.net
14	AM	(Tunisia)	Belaid	24	EU	Union Berlin (Germany)	Contract termination ✗	Winter	Free	fc-union-berlin.de
5	DM	(Bosnia and Herzegovina)	Jahić	30	EU	Kardemir Karabükspor (Turkey)	Transfer ✓	Winter	€300K	kardemirkarabukspor.org.tr

Total income: ▲€300K

Last updated: 31 January 2012

== Club ==
=== Management ===
Position	Staff
Manager	(Serbia) Ivan Jovanović
Assistant manager/Scout	(Serbia) Predrag Erak
Assistant manager	(Greece) Christos Kontis
Goalkeeping coach	(Serbia) Goran Čumić
Fitness coach	(Cyprus) Giorgos Paraskeva
Team doctor	(Cyprus) Costas Schizas

Last updated: 3 December 2011
Source: apoelfc.com.cy

=== Kit ===
Supplier: Puma
Sponsor(s): MTN, Cyprus Airways

Home	Away	Third

Source: apoelfc.com.cy

=== Other information ===
Chairman	(Cyprus) Phivos Erotokritou
Ground (capacity and dimensions)	GSP Stadium (22,859 / 105x68 m)

Source: apoelfc.com.cy

== Squad stats ==
				Total						Cypriot First Division					Cypriot Cup					LTV Super Cup					UEFA Champions League				
Country	N	P	Name	GS	A	Mins.	Gls.	Y	R	A	Mins.	Gls.	Y	R	A	Mins.	Gls.	Y	R	A	Mins.	Gls.	Y	R	A	Mins.	Gls.	Y	R
(Cyprus)	1	GK	Constantinou																										
(Portugal)	3	CB	Paulo Jorge	33	33	2931	1	9		18	1551	1	7		1	90									14	1290		2	
(Brazil)	4	CB	Kaká	22	25	2025		2		20	1588		1		1	90									4	347		1	
(Bosnia and Herzegovina)	5	DM	Jahić	9	22	1019		7		11	671		5							1	90		1		10	258		1	
(Brazil)	6	CB	Oliveira	33	34	2931	1	9		21	1808	1	5		3	270		2		1	90				9	763		2	
(Greece)	7	RB	Poursaitides	35	36	3077	1	8		19	1543	1	3		2	180		1		1	90				14	1264		4	
(Brazil)	8	CF	Aílton	27	36	2513	11	3		21	1422	4	1		1	25									14	1066	7	2	
(Argentina)	9	CF	Solari	20	46	1987	13	7		31	1393	11	4		2	107		1		1	90				12	397	2	2	
(Cyprus)	10	RM	Charalambides	32	49	2944	8	7		30	1723	7	4		3	46				1	79				15	1096	1	3	
(North Macedonia)	11	CF	Tričkovski	33	41	3024	7	2		24	1825	6			3	152				1	11				13	1036	1	2	
(Cyprus)	12	AM	Panayiotou																										
(Tunisia)	14	AM	Belaid	4	9	425	1	1		8	395	1	1												1	30			
(Cyprus)	15	LB	Antoniades																										
(Cyprus)	17	DM	Satsias	1	11	192		2		7	126		1		1	45				1	1				2	20		1	
(Cyprus)	19	RB	Elia	3	6	343	1	1		5	298	1													1	45		1	
(Paraguay)	20	RW	Adorno	16	31	1375	4	1		20	818		1		3	251	3			1	89				7	217	1		
(Brazil)	21	LM	Manduca	36	40	2808	12	8	1	23	1614	4	2		2	137	2	1							15	1057	6	5	1
(Greece)	22	GK	Chiotis	31	31	2782	-23	1		16	1440	-12	1		2	180	-2			1	90				12	1072	-9		
(Portugal)	23	CM	Pinto	42	50	3736	1	6		32	2355	1	2		3	158		1		1	11				14	1212		3	
(Greece)	24	CB	Kontis	9	9	810	1	1		2	180		1							1	90	1			6	540			
(Cyprus)	25	CB	Christofides																										
(Portugal)	26	DM	Morais	477	48	4160	4	11	1	28	2330	1	6	1	3	270	2	2		1	90		1		16	1470	1	2	
(Cyprus)	27	CM	Antoniou																										
(Cyprus)	29	LB	Alexandrou	23	38	2238	1	5		26	1730	1	2		3	201		1		1	90				8	217		2	
(Portugal)	31	AM	Hélder Sousa	12	17	1108	1	2		13	824	1	2		1	73									3	211			
(Cyprus)	77	RB	Solomou	18	22	1670	1	2		16	1284	1	2		1	90									5	296			
(Spain)	78	GK	Pardo	19	20	1748	-14	1		14	1260	-6	1		1	90									5	398	-8		
(Brazil)	81	AM	Marcinho	34	40	3001	3	4		25	2009	2	2		3	245	1			1	79				11	668		2	
(Cyprus)	88	GK	Kissas	2	2	180	-1			2	180	-1																	
(Brazil)	98	LB	Boaventura	32	32	2868	2	8		16	1403	1	7		3	270	1								13	1195		1	

Last updated: 13 May 2012
Source: Match reports in competitive matches, apoelfc.com.cy
Ordered by start team, game starts and position on pitch (from back right to front left)
0 shown as blank
Country: when 2 flags, 1st flag = country that plays for internationally, 2nd flag = country of birth; N = number on jersey; P = Position; Name = Name on jersey (for more extended name, pause the mouse pointer on the name); GS = Game Started; A = Appearances.

=== Top scorers ===
R	Player	Position	League	Cup	Super Cup	Champ. League	Total
1	(Argentina) Solari	CF	11	0	0	2	13
2	(Brazil) Manduca	LW	4	2	0	6	12
3	(Brazil) Aílton	CF	4	0	0	7	11
4	(Cyprus) Charalambides	RW	7	0	0	1	8
5	(North Macedonia) Tričkovski	RW	6	0	0	1	7
6	(Portugal) Morais	DM	1	2	0	1	4
6	(Paraguay) Adorno	RW	0	3	0	1	4
8	(Brazil) Marcinho	AM	2	1	0	0	3
9	(Brazil) Boaventura	LB	1	1	0	0	2
10	(Brazil) Oliveira	CB	1	0	0	0	1
10	(Cyprus) Elia	RB	1	0	0	0	1
10	(Tunisia) Belaid	AM	1	0	0	0	1
10	(Portugal) Pinto	CM	1	0	0	0	1
10	(Cyprus) Solomou	RB	1	0	0	0	1
10	(Cyprus) Alexandrou	LB	1	0	0	0	1
10	(Greece) Poursaitides	RB	1	0	0	0	1
10	(Portugal) Paulo Jorge	CB	1	0	0	0	1
10	(Portugal) Hélder Sousa	AM	1	0	0	0	1
10	(Greece) Kontis	CB	0	0	1	0	1
Own goals			1	0	0	1	2
TOTAL			46	9	1	20	76

Last updated: 13 May 2012
Source: Match reports in Competitive matches

=== Captains ===
1. (Cyprus) Marinos Satsias
2. (Cyprus) Constantinos Charalambides
3. (Cyprus) Marios Elia
4. (Portugal) Hélio Pinto

== Pre-season friendlies ==
21 June 2011 Friendly	SV Grödig (Austria)	0–2	(Cyprus) APOEL	Obertraun, Austria
19:00 EET		(Report)	Pinto 7'; Aílton 82'	Referee: (Austria) Oliver Drachta

24 June 2011 Friendly	APOEL (Cyprus)	3–2	(Slovakia) Tatran Prešov	Obertraun, Austria
18:00 EET	Pinto 6'; Adorno 48', 83'	(Report)	Petráš 27'; Bernardo 80'

27 June 2011 Salzburg Airport Cup	APOEL (Cyprus)	0–2	(Romania) CFR Cluj	Eugendorf, Salzburg
19:30 EET		(Report)	Bud 3'; Peralta 19' (pen.)	Referee: (Austria) Bernd Hirschbichler

1 July 2011 Salzburg Airport Cup	APOEL (Cyprus)	1–1	(Czech Republic) Sparta Prague	Eugendorf, Salzburg
19:30 EET	Adorno 65'	(Report)	Matějovský 50'	Referee: (Austria) Michael Pointner

== Mid-season friendlies ==
5 October 2011 Friendly	APOEL (Cyprus)	5–2	(Cyprus) PAEEK	Archangelos Training Centre, Nicosia
17:30 EET	Oliveira (1-0); Morais (2-0); Jahić (3-0); Adorno (4-1); Solari (5-1)	(Report)	Georgiou (3-1); Pedras (pen.) (5-2)

== Competitions ==
=== Overall ===
Competition	Started round	Final position / round	First match	Last match
Marfin Laiki League	—	2nd	29 August 2011	12 May 2012
UEFA Champions League	2nd qualifying	Quarter-finals	13 July 2011	4 April 2012
Cypriot Cup	1st round	2nd round	11 January 2012	23 February 2012
LTV Super Cup	Final	Winners	7 August 2011	

Updated to match played 12 May 2012
Source: Competitions

=== Laiki Bank League ===
==== Classification ====
Pos	Team	Pld	W	D	L	GF	GA	GD	Pts	Qualification or relegation
1	AEL Limassol	26	18	6	2	33	7	+26	60	Qualification for second round, Group A
2	Omonia Nicosia	26	17	6	3	47	16	+31	57	Qualification for second round, Group A
3	APOEL	26	17	5	4	39	13	+26	56	Qualification for second round, Group A
4	Anorthosis Famagusta	26	15	7	4	30	12	+18	52	Qualification for second round, Group A
5	AEK Larnaca	26	11	9	6	33	21	+12	42	Qualification for second round, Group B

Source: UEFA
Rules for classification: 1) points; 2) head-to-head points; 3) head-to-head goal difference; 4) head-to-head away goals scored; 5) goal difference; 6) number of goals scored

==== Results summary ====
Overall								Home						Away					
Pld	W	D	L	GF	GA	GD	Pts	W	D	L	GF	GA	GD	W	D	L	GF	GA	GD
32	20	6	6	46	19	+27	66	10	3	3	20	8	+12	10	3	3	26	11	+15

Last updated: 12 May 2012.
Source: UEFA

==== Results by round ====
Round	1	2	3	4	5	6	7	8	9	10	11	12	13	14	15	16	17	18	19	20	21	22	23	24	25	26	27	28	29	30	31	32
Ground	A	H	A	H	A	H	A	H	A	H	A	H	A	H	A	H	A	H	A	H	A	H	A	H	A	H	A	H	H	A	H	A
Result	D	W	W	W	W	L	W	D	L	W	W	W	W	W	L	D	W	W	D	W	L	W	W	W	W	D	W	L	W	D	L	W
Position	6	4	1	1	1	3	3	3	3	3	3	3	1	1	3	4	4	3	3	2	3	3	3	3	3	3	2	2	2	2	2	2

Updated to match(es) played on 12 May 2012. Source: apoelfc.com.cy
A = Away; H = Home; W = Win; D = Draw; L = Loss

==== Play-offs ====
The first 12 teams are divided into 3 groups. Points are carried over from the first round.

===== Group A =====
Pos	Team	Pld	W	D	L	GF	GA	GD	Pts	Qualification
1	AEL Limassol (C)	32	20	8	4	37	10	+27	68	Qualification for Champions League second qualifying round
2	APOEL	32	20	6	6	46	19	+27	66 (Note: APOE: 7pts; OMO: 4pts)	Qualification for Europa League second qualifying round
3	Omonia	32	20	6	6	56	23	+33	66	Qualification for Europa League third qualifying round (Note: The 2011–12 Cypriot Cup winners, Omonia, qualified for the third qualifying round of UEFA Europa League. Since they finished third, the fourth-placed team of the league also qualified for the Europa League.)
4	Anorthosis Famagusta	32	17	8	7	36	22	+14	59	Qualification for Europa League second qualifying round

Rules for classification: 1) points; 2) head-to-head points; 3) head-to-head goal difference; 4) head-to-head goals scored; 5) goal difference; 6) number of goals scored.
(C) Champions

==== Matches ====
Kick-off times are in EET.

===== Regular season =====
29 August 2011 Matchweek 1	AEK Larnaca	0–0	APOEL	GSZ Stadium, Larnaca
19:00		(Report)		Attendance: 8,000; Referee: Savvas Zafiris

9 September 2011 Matchweek 2	APOEL	3–1	Alki Larnaca	GSP Stadium, Nicosia
19:00	Oliveira 3'; Elia 60'; Solari 90+3'	(Report)	Firţulescu 85'	Attendance: 6,946; Referee: Marios Panayi

18 September 2011 Matchweek 3	Olympiakos Nicosia	1–4	APOEL	GSP Stadium, Nicosia
18:00	Soteriou 71'; Pina (yellow card) 67' (yellow-red card)	(Report)	Charalambides 49', 90+2'; Solari 64' (pen.), 69'	Attendance: 6,423; Referee: Charalambos Skapoullis

24 September 2011 Matchweek 4	APOEL	1–0	Aris Limassol	GSP Stadium, Nicosia
19:00	Boaventura 86'	(Report)		Attendance: 6,345; Referee: Leontios Trattos

2 October 2011 Matchweek 5	Apollon Limassol	0–2	APOEL	Tsirion Stadium, Limassol
18:00		(Report)	Solari 71' (pen.); Aílton 87'	Attendance: 6,392; Referee: Ioannis Anastasiou

15 October 2011 Matchweek 6	APOEL	0–1	AEL Limassol	GSP Stadium, Nicosia
18:00		(Report)	Monteiro 56'	Attendance: 9,835; Referee: Christos Nicolaides

23 October 2011 Matchweek 7	Ethnikos Achna	0–3	APOEL	Dasaki Stadium, Achna
18:00	Milutinović (yellow card) 61' (yellow-red card)	(Report)	Charalambides 35'; Tričkovski 55'; Simov 71' (o.g.)	Attendance: 3,500; Referee: Marios Tsaggaris

28 October 2011 Matchweek 8	APOEL	0–0	Anorthosis	GSP Stadium, Nicosia
19:00		(Report)	Laban (yellow card) 90+2' (yellow-red card)	Attendance: 10,350; Referee: Leontios Trattos

6 November 2011 Matchweek 9	Nea Salamina	1–0	APOEL	Ammochostos Stadium, Larnaca
17:00	León 16'	(Report)		Attendance: 3,000; Referee: Marios Panayi

19 November 2011 Matchweek 10	APOEL	2–0	Ermis Aradippou	GSP Stadium, Nicosia
18:00	Manduca 79'; Belaid 82'	(Report)		Attendance: 5,192; Referee: Thomas Mouskos

27 November 2011 Matchweek 11	Enosis Neon Paralimni	0–2	APOEL	Tasos Markou, Paralimni
17:00		(Report)	Marcinho 76'; Pinto 82'	Attendance: 2,500; Referee: Marios Tsaggaris

2 December 2011 Matchweek 12	APOEL	2–0	Anagennisi Dherynia	GSP Stadium, Nicosia
19:00	Solari 16'; Charalambides 58'	(Report)		Attendance: 6,000; Referee: Charalambos Skapoullis

11 December 2011 Matchweek 13	Omonia	1–3	APOEL	GSP Stadium, Nicosia
14:30	Avraam 9'; Bouzón (yellow card) 31' (yellow-red card)	(Report)	Solomou 42'; Solari 74', 78'	Attendance: 16,419; Referee: Marios Tsaggaris

19 December 2011 Matchweek 14	APOEL	3–0	AEK Larnaca	GSP Stadium, Nicosia
18:00	Tričkovski 32', 80', 90+2'	(Report)		Attendance: 8,000; Referee: Savvas Zafiris

8 January 2012 Matchweek 15	Alki Larnaca	2–1	APOEL	GSZ Stadium, Larnaca
18:00	Conde 36', 90+3'		Tričkovski 3'	Attendance: 3,000; Referee: Stelios Trifonos

16 January 2012 Matchweek 16	APOEL	0–0	Olympiakos Nicosia	GSP Stadium, Nicosia
19:00		(Report)		Attendance: 5,313; Referee: Leontios Trattos

21 January 2012 Matchweek 17	Aris Limassol	0–1	APOEL	Tsirion Stadium, Limassol
17:00		(Report)	Alexandrou 77'	Attendance: 2,842; Referee: Demetris Masias

29 January 2012 Matchweek 18	APOEL	2–1	Apollon Limassol	GSP Stadium, Nicosia
14:30	Poursaitides 69'; Charalambides 90+2'	(Report)	Núñez 42'	Attendance: 7,327; Referee: Marios Panayi

5 February 2012 Matchweek 19	AEL Limassol	0–0	APOEL	Tsirion Stadium, Limassol
15:00		(Report)		Attendance: 8,160; Referee: Marios Tsaggaris

10 February 2012 Matchweek 20	APOEL	2–1	Ethnikos Achna	GSP Stadium, Nicosia
19:00	Charalambides 23', 41'	(Report)	Vattis 80'	Attendance: 5,500; Referee: Thomas Mouskos

19 February 2012 Matchweek 21	Anorthosis	2–0	APOEL	Antonis Papadopoulos, Larnaca
15:00	Zairi 11'; Roncatto 14'	(Report)		Attendance: 6,000; Referee: Leontios trattos

26 February 2012 Matchweek 22	APOEL	1–0	Nea Salamina	GSP Stadium, Nicosia
18:00	Manduca 26'	(Report)		Attendance: 4,679; Referee: Vasilis Demetriou

3 March 2012 Matchweek 23	Ermis Aradippou	1–4	APOEL	Ammochostos Stadium, Larnaca
18:00	Papathanasiou 84'	(Report)	Solari 6', 53'; Morais 21'; Paulo Jorge 50'	Attendance: 2,500; Referee: Savvas Zafiris

12 March 2012 Matchweek 24	APOEL	1–0	Enosis Neon Paralimni	GSP Stadium, Nicosia
19:00	Aílton 85'	(Report)	Faria (yellow card) 83' (yellow-red card)	Attendance: 16,300; Referee: Thomas Mouskos

17 March 2012 Matchweek 25	Anagennisi Dherynia	1–2	APOEL	Tasos Markou, Paralimni
18:00	Kolokoudias 5'	(Report)	Aílton 32' (pen.); Solari 71'	Attendance: 2,000; Referee: Kostas Psevdiotis

27 March 2012 Matchweek 26	APOEL	0–0	Omonia	GSP Stadium, Nicosia
16:00		(Report)	Aloneftis (yellow card) 45' (yellow-red card)	Attendance: 18,000; Referee: Demetris Masias

===== Play-offs =====
31 March 2012 Matchweek 1	Omonia	1–2	APOEL	GSP Stadium, Nicosia
17:00	Christofi 56'	(Report)	Hélder Sousa 45+1'; Manduca 90+3'	Attendance: Behind closed doors Referee: Thomas Mouskos

8 April 2012 Matchweek 2	APOEL	1–2	Anorthosis	GSP Stadium, Nicosia
17:00	Manduca 68'	(Report)	Rezek 6'; Laborde 50'	Attendance: Behind closed doors Referee: Charalambos Skapoullis

22 April 2012 Matchweek 3	APOEL	1–0	AEL Limassol	GSP Stadium, Nicosia
19:00	Tričkovski 90+4'	(Report)		Attendance: Behind closed doors Referee: Christos Nicolaides

28 April 2012 Matchweek 4	AEL Limassol	0–0	APOEL	Tsirion Stadium, Limassol
17:00	Monteiro (yellow card) 62' (yellow-red card)	(Report)		Attendance: 8,295; Referee: Marios Panayi

5 May 2012 Matchweek 5	APOEL	1–2	Omonia	GSP Stadium, Nicosia
17:00	Aílton 40'; Morais (yellow card) 90+3' (red card)	(Report)	Avraam 21'; Christofi 80'	Attendance: 14,000; Referee: Leontios Trattos

12 May 2012 Matchweek 6	Anorthosis	1–2	APOEL	Antonis Papadopoulos, Larnaca
17:00	Okkas 62'	(Report)	Marcinho 37'; Solari 60'	Attendance: 1,500; Referee: Antonis Christodoulou

=== UEFA Champions League ===
==== Qualifying phase ====
===== Second qualifying round =====
13 July 2011 First Leg	Skënderbeu Korçë (Albania)	0–2	(Cyprus) APOEL	Skënderbeu Stadium, Korçë
20:00 CET		(Report 1) (Report 2)	Morais 52'; Manduca 56'	Attendance: 10,000; Referee: (Slovakia) Ján Valášek

20 July 2011 Second Leg	APOEL (Cyprus)	4–0	(Albania) Skënderbeu Korçë	GSP Stadium, Nicosia
19:00 CET	Solari 59'; Aílton 66'; Adorno 80'; Charalambides 86'	(Report 1) (Report 2)		Attendance: 11,271; Referee: (Italy) Andrea De Marco

APOEL won 6–0 on aggregate.

===== Third qualifying round =====
26 July 2011 First Leg	APOEL (Cyprus)	0–0	(Slovakia) Slovan Bratislava	GSP Stadium, Nicosia
19:00 CET		(Report 1) (Report 2)		Attendance: 14,774; Referee: (Netherlands) Pol van Boekel

3 August 2011 Second Leg	Slovan Bratislava (Slovakia)	0–2	(Cyprus) APOEL	Štadión Pasienky, Bratislava
20:15 CET	Grendel (yellow card) 60' (yellow-red card)	(Report 1) (Report 2)	Aílton 58'; Manduca 90+4'	Attendance: 9,318; Referee: (Germany) Peter Sippel

APOEL won 2–0 on aggregate.

===== Play-off round =====
17 August 2011 First Leg	Wisła Kraków (Poland)	1–0	(Cyprus) APOEL	Stadion Miejski, Kraków
20:45 CET	Małecki 71'	(Report 1) (Report 2)		Attendance: 22,545; Referee: (France) Stéphane Lannoy

23 August 2011 Second Leg	APOEL (Cyprus)	3–1	(Poland) Wisła Kraków	GSP Stadium, Nicosia
20:45 CET	Pareiko 29' (o.g.); Aílton 54', 87'	(Report 1) (Report 2)	Wilk 71'	Attendance: 21,665; Referee: (Hungary) Viktor Kassai

APOEL won 3–2 on aggregate.

==== Group stage ====
===== Group G standings and fixtures =====
Pos	Team	Pld	W	D	L	GF	GA	GD	Pts	Qualification	APO	ZEN	POR	SHK
1	(Cyprus) APOEL	6	2	3	1	6	6	0	9 (Note: Head-to-head points: APOEL 4, Zenit Saint Petersburg 1.)	Advance to knockout phase	—	2–1	2–1	0–2
2	(Russia) Zenit Saint Petersburg	6	2	3	1	7	5	+2	9	Advance to knockout phase	0–0	—	3–1	1–0
3	(Portugal) Porto	6	2	2	2	7	7	0	8	Transfer to Europa League	1–1	0–0	—	2–1
4	(Ukraine) Shakhtar Donetsk	6	1	2	3	6	8	−2	5		1–1	2–2	0–2	—

Source: Soccerway

===== Matches =====
13 September 2011 Match Day 1	APOEL (Cyprus)	2–1	(Russia) Zenit St. Petersburg	GSP Stadium, Nicosia
20:45 CET	Manduca 73'; Aílton 75'	(Report 1) (Report 2)	Zyryanov 63'; Bruno Alves (yellow card) 76' (yellow-red card)	Attendance: 21,269; Referee: (Spain) Eduardo Iturralde González

28 September 2011 Match Day 2	Shakhtar Donetsk (Ukraine)	1–1	(Cyprus) APOEL	Donbas Arena, Donetsk
20:45 CET	Jádson 64'	(Report 1) (Report 2)	Tričkovski 61'	Attendance: 47,014; Referee: (Austria) Robert Schörgenhofer

19 October 2011 Match Day 3	Porto (Portugal)	1–1	(Cyprus) APOEL	Estádio do Dragão, Porto
20:45 CET	Hulk 13'	(Report 1) (Report 2)	Aílton 19'	Attendance: 32,512; Referee: (France) Antony Gautier

1 November 2011 Match Day 4	APOEL (Cyprus)	2–1	(Portugal) Porto	GSP Stadium, Nicosia
20:45 CET	Aílton 42' (pen.); Manduca 90'	(Report 1) (Report 2)	Hulk 89' (pen.)	Attendance: 22,301; Referee: (Italy) Gianluca Rocchi

23 November 2011 Match Day 5	Zenit St. Petersburg (Russia)	0–0	(Cyprus) APOEL	Petrovsky Stadium, Saint Petersburg
18:00 CET		(Report 1) (Report 2)		Attendance: 21,500; Referee: (Germany) Felix Brych

6 December 2011 Match Day 6	APOEL (Cyprus)	0–2	(Ukraine) Shakhtar Donetsk	GSP Stadium, Nicosia
20:45 CET		(Report 1) (Report 2)	Luiz Adriano 62'; Seleznyov 78'	Attendance: 22,537; Referee: (Romania) Ovidiu Alin Hategan

==== Knockout phase ====
===== Round of 16 =====
14 February 2012 First Leg	Lyon (France)	1–0	(Cyprus) APOEL	Stade de Gerland, Lyon
20:45 CET	Lacazette 58'	(Report 1) (Report 2)		Attendance: 32,010; Referee: (Italy) Paolo Tagliavento

7 March 2012 Second Leg	APOEL (Cyprus)	1–0 (a.e.t.) (4–3 p)	(France) Lyon	GSP Stadium, Nicosia
20:45 CET	Manduca 9', (yellow card) 115' (yellow-red card)	(Report 1) (Report 2)		Attendance: 22,701; Referee: (Spain) Alberto Undiano Mallenco
	Penalties
	Aílton (penalty scored); Morais (penalty scored); Alexandrou (penalty scored); Tričkovski (penalty scored)		(penalty scored) Källström; (penalty scored) Lisandro; (penalty scored) Gomis; (penalty missed) Lacazette; (penalty missed) Bastos

1–1 on aggregate. APOEL won 4–3 on penalties.

===== Quarter-finals =====
27 March 2012 First Leg	APOEL (Cyprus)	0–3	(Spain) Real Madrid	GSP Stadium, Nicosia
20:45 CET		(Report 1) (Report 2)	Benzema 74', 90'; Kaká 82'	Attendance: 22,385; Referee: (Germany) Felix Brych

4 April 2012 Second Leg	Real Madrid (Spain)	5–2	(Cyprus) APOEL	Santiago Bernabéu, Madrid
20:45 CET	Ronaldo 26', 76'; Kaká 37'; Callejón 80'; Di María 84'	(Report 1) (Report 2)	Manduca 67'; Solari 82' (pen.)	Attendance: 54,627; Referee: (Italy) Gianluca Rocchi

Real Madrid won 8–2 on aggregate.

=== LTV Super Cup ===
7 August 2011 Final	APOEL	1–0	Omonia	GSP Stadium, Nicosia
20:00 EET	Kontis 81'	(Report)		Attendance: 9,752; Referee: Demetris Chrysostomou

APOEL won the 2011 Cypriot Super Cup (12th title).

=== Cypriot Cup ===
==== First round ====
11 January 2012 Knock-out	APOEL	9–1	Akritas Chlorakas	GSP Stadium, Nicosia
18:00 EET	Manduca 7', 14'; Adorno 19', 71', 90'; Morais 57', 70'; Marcinho 64'; Boaventura 82'	(Report)	Forbes 89'	Attendance: 1,837; Referee: Demetris Chrysostomou

==== Second round ====
25 January 2012 First Leg	APOEL	0–1	AEL Limassol	GSP Stadium, Nicosia
16:00 EET		(Report)	Vouho 40'	Attendance: 7,000; Referee: Christos Nicolaides

23 February 2012 Second Leg	AEL Limassol	0–0	APOEL	Tsirion Stadium, Limassol
16:00 EET		(Report)		Attendance: 5,675; Referee: Marios Panayi

AEL Limassol won 1–0 on aggregate.
