= Vasilios Papafotis =

Cypriot footballer

Vasilis Papafotis
Personal information
- Full name: Vasilios Papafotis
- Date of birth: 10 August 1995 (age 31)
- Place of birth: Nicosia, Cyprus
- Height: 1.74 m (5 ft 9 in)
- Position: Attacking midfielder

Youth career
- 2010: APOEL

Senior career*
Years	Team	Apps	(Gls)
2013–2018	APOEL	11	(0)
2017–2018	→ Doxa Katokopias (loan)	30	(4)
2018	AEL	0	(0)
2018–2020	Doxa Katokopias	45	(7)
2020–2026	AEL Limassol	119	(8)

International career^{‡}
2011–2013	Cyprus U17	7	(2)
2013–2014	Cyprus U19	9	(3)
2015–2016	Cyprus U21	10	(1)
2017–	Cyprus	1	(0)
- * Club domestic league appearances and goals as of 9 May 2026 ‡ National team caps and goals as of 23 March 2018

Vasilios Papafotis (Greek: Βασίλειος Παπαφώτης; born 10 August 1995) is a Cypriot professional footballer who plays as an attacking midfielder.

== Career ==
=== APOEL ===
Papafotis is a product of APOEL Academies. He signed his first professional contract with APOEL on 3 December 2013 and made his official debut on 19 December 2013, playing for 60 minutes in a Cypriot Cup match against Digenis Oroklinis. Three days later, on 22 December 2013, he made his league debut, coming on as a substitute in APOEL's 3–0 away win against Enosis Neon Paralimni.

During his first two seasons at APOEL, Papafotis celebrated two consecutive doubles, as the club won both the 2013–14 and 2014–15 season's championship and cup. After the end of the 2015–16 season, in which he crowned champion for a third time in the row, Papafotis signed a new two-year contract extension with APOEL.

=== AEL ===
On 17 July 2018, Super League club AEL officially announced the signing of Papafotis on a three-year deal. Papafotis left the club after just 10 days of being with the team, after a mutual contract dissolvement agreement.

=== Doxa Katokopias ===
Papafotis joined Doxa on 27 July 2018 as a free transfer and stayed with the club for 3 years before moving to AEL Limassol.

=== AEL Limassol ===
On 20 July 2020, Papafotis signed a three-year contract with AEL Limassol. Vasilis renewed with AEL Limassol for another 2 years on 20 June 2023, with his contract expiring in the summer of 2025.

== Career statistics ==
=== Club ===
As of 20 May 2017

Club	Season	League			Cup		Continental (Note: Includes UEFA Champions League and UEFA Europa League matches.)		Other (Note: Includes Cypriot Super Cup matches.)		Total	
Club	Season	Division	Apps	Goals	Apps	Goals	Apps	Goals	Apps	Goals	Apps	Goals
APOEL	2013–14	Cypriot First Division	2	0	1	0	0	0	0	0	3	0
APOEL	2014–15	Cypriot First Division	4	0	2	0	0	0	0	0	6	0
APOEL	2015–16	Cypriot First Division	2	0	0	0	0	0	0	0	2	0
APOEL	2016–17	Cypriot First Division	3	0	2	0	0	0	0	0	5	0
APOEL	Total		11	0	5	0	0	0	0	0	16	0
Doxa	2017–18	Cypriot First Division	30	4	0	0	0	0	0	0	30	4
Doxa	2018–19	Cypriot First Division	26	3	0	0	0	0	0	0	26	3
Doxa	2019–20	Cypriot First Division	19	4	4	0	0	0	0	0	23	4
Doxa	Total		75	11	4	0	0	0	0	0	79	11
AEL	2020–21	Cypriot First Division	19	2	3	0	0	0	0	0	22	3
AEL	2021–22	Cypriot First Division	23	0	4	1	0	0	0	0	27	1
AEL	2022–23	Cypriot First Division	31	2	5	0	0	0	0	0	36	2
AEL	2023–24	Cypriot First Division	12	2	0	0	0	0	0	0	12	2
AEL	Total		85	6	12	1	0	0	0	0	97	7
Career total			171	17	21	1	0	0	0	0	192	18

== Honours ==
APOEL

- Cypriot First Division (4): 2013–14, 2014–15, 2015–16, 2016–17
- Cypriot Cup (2): 2013–14, 2014–15
