= Valmir Nafiu =

Macedonian footballer (born 1994)

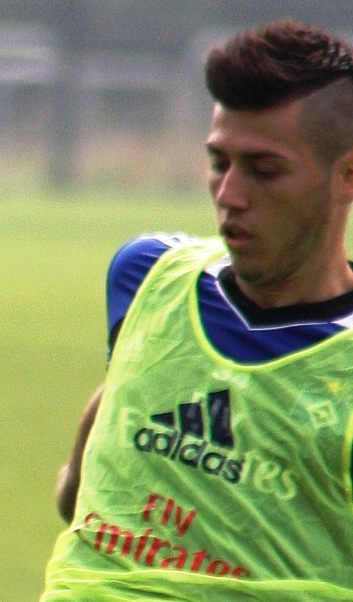

Personal information
- Date of birth: 23 April 1994 (age 32)
- Place of birth: Tetovo, Macedonia
- Height: 1.75 m (5 ft 9 in)
- Positions: Winger; striker

Team information
- Current team: Malisheva
- Number: 18

Youth career
- Shkëndija
- 2012: Basel
- 2012–2013: Hamburger SV

Senior career*
Years	Team	Apps	(Gls)
2010–2011	Shkëndija	19	(1)
2011–2012	Basel	0	(0)
2012–2013	Hamburger SV II	12	(4)
2013–2015	Hamburger SV	2	(0)
2015	APOEL	10	(1)
2016	Skënderbeu	1	(0)
2016–2018	Renova	62	(11)
2018–2023	Shkëndija	108	(12)
2023	→ FC Košice (loan)	12	(0)
2024	Otrant-Olympic	9	(2)
2024-2026	Ferizaj	31	(5)
2026-	Malisheva	14	(0)

International career^{‡}
	Macedonia U17	16	(11)
	Macedonia U19	5	(1)
2013–2015	Macedonia U21	6	(0)
- * Club domestic league appearances and goals as of 22 June 2026 ‡ National team caps and goals as of 11 June 2015

Valmir Nafiu (Macedonian: Валмир Нафиу; born 23 April 1994) is a Macedonian professional footballer who plays mainly as a winger or striker for Malisheva.

== Club career ==
=== Shkëndija ===
At the end of his debuting season, Nafiu garnered interest from FC Basel and FC Barcelona.

He went on trial where he impressed the Swiss club and Basel and Shkëndija reached a deal for Nafiu to remain in Switzerland before officially completing the transfer once he turned eighteen.

=== Basel ===
Nafiu officially joined on 23 April 2012, on his eighteenth birthday. He mainly played for the youth teams at Basel and was not capped at senior level. At Basel, Nafiu trained under Thorsten Fink.

=== Hamburger SV ===
When Fink left Basel and took the managerial position at Hamburger SV, Nafiu followed suit. In 2012, Nafiu made his debut for Hamburg's reserve team. He made his Bundesliga debut at 25 October 2014 against Hertha BSC replacing Pierre-Michel Lasogga after 74 minutes in a 3–0 away defeat. He added a further Bundesliga appearance against VfL Wolfsburg on 9 November 2014, before he mutually terminated his contract with Hamburger SV in January 2015.

=== APOEL ===
On 27 January 2015, Nafiu signed a four-and-a-half-year contract with contract with Cypriot club APOEL FC. He made his official debut on 31 January 2015, coming on as a 75th-minute substitute in APOEL's 1–0 away victory against Nea Salamina in the Cypriot First Division. He scored his first official goal for APOEL on 21 March 2015, in his team's 2–2 home draw against Apollon Limassol in the First Division play-offs. In his first season at APOEL, he appeared in twelve matches in all competitions and helped his team to win both the league title and the 2014–15 Cypriot Cup.

On 18 December 2015, APOEL announced that Nafiu's contract with the club was terminated by mutual consent.

=== Skënderbeu ===
In early 2016 Nafiu joined Albanian side Skënderbeu, winning the 2015–16 league title but playing very little.

=== Renova ===
Nafiu returned to his native North Macedonia in summer 2016, signing with Renova. Over two seasons, he became a regular starter scoring 11 goals.

=== Shkëndija ===
Nafiu's performances for Renova attracted the attentions of his youth club Shkëndija and he returned to the club in 2018, winning the league title in his first season there.

== Career statistics ==
As of 20 April 2015

Appearances and goals by club, season and competition
Club	Season	League			National cup		Continental (Note: Includes UEFA Champions League and UEFA Europa League matches.)		Total	
Club	Season	Division	Apps	Goals	Apps	Goals	Apps	Goals	Apps	Goals
Shkëndija	2010–11	Macedonian First League	19	1	0	0	—		19	1
Shkëndija	2011–12	Macedonian First League	0	0	0	0	1	0	1	0
Shkëndija	Total		19	1	0	0	1	0	20	1
FC Basel	2011–12	Swiss Super League	0	0	0	0	0	0	0	0
Hamburger SV II	2012–13	Regionalliga Nord	12	1	—		—		12	1
Hamburger SV	2013–14	Bundesliga	0	0	0	0	—		0	0
Hamburger SV	2014–15	Bundesliga	2	0	0	0	—		2	0
Hamburger SV	Total		2	0	0	0	—		2	0
APOEL	2014–15	Cypriot First Division	10	1	2	0	—		12	1
APOEL	2015–16	Cypriot First Division	0	0	0	0	0	0	0	0
APOEL	Total		10	1	2	0	—		12	1
Career total			43	3	2	0	1	0	46	3

== Honours ==
Shkëndija

- Macedonian First League: 2010–11, 2018–19

APOEL

- Cypriot First Division: 2014–15
- Cypriot Cup: 2014–15
