= Andreas Christofides =

Cypriot professional footballer

Personal information
- Full name: Andreas Drakos Christofides
- Date of birth: 14 October 1992 (age 34)
- Place of birth: Nicosia, Cyprus
- Height: 1.83 m (6 ft 0 in)
- Position: Centre back

Team information
- Current team: Nea Salamina

Youth career
- APOEL

Senior career*
Years	Team	Apps	(Gls)
2011–2015	APOEL	1	(0)
2013–2014	→ Alki Larnaca (loan)	20	(0)
2015–2018	Olympiakos Nicosia	45	(3)
2018–	Nea Salamina	0	(0)

International career^{‡}
2010	Cyprus U19	3	(0)
2011–2014	Cyprus U21	13	(0)
- * Club domestic league appearances and goals as of 26 March 2016 ‡ National team caps and goals as of 9 September 2014

Andreas Drakos Christofides (Greek: Αντρέας Δράκος Χριστοφίδης; born 14 October 1992) is a Cypriot professional footballer who played as a centre back for Nea Salamina in the Cypriot First Division.

== Career ==
=== APOEL ===
Christofides is a product of APOEL Academies. He was promoted to the first team in the 2011–12 season, but he didn't made any official appearance until the end of the 2012–13 season.

In July 2013, he joined Alki Larnaca on a season-long loan deal from APOEL, in order to gain valuable first team experience. During his loan spell, Christofides was a regular starter for Alki, appearing in 20 league matches.

On 4 June 2014, he returned to APOEL and signed a one-year contract extension with the club. He made his official APOEL debut on 28 January 2015, playing the full 90 minutes in his team's 3–0 home win against Olympiakos Nicosia for the Cypriot Cup. During 2014–15 season, Christofides appeared only in three matches in all competitions, but he managed to win his first career titles, as APOEL won both the Cypriot championship and the cup.

On 28 May 2015, four days after winning the double with APOEL, the team announced that Christofides was leaving the club as his contract would not be renewed.

=== Olympiakos Nicosia ===
In June 2015 he signed for fellow Nicosia club Olympiakos Nicosia.

=== AE Sias ===
After an extended career break, in July 2022 Christofides joined the Champions and Cup Winners of Poel's B Division, AE Sias.

== Career statistics ==
=== Club ===
As of 26 March 2016

Club	Season	League			Cup		Continental (Note: Includes UEFA Champions League and UEFA Europa League matches.)		Other (Note: Includes Cypriot Super Cup matches.)		Total	
Club	Season	Division	Apps	Goals	Apps	Goals	Apps	Goals	Apps	Goals	Apps	Goals
APOEL	2011–12	Cypriot First Division	0	0	0	0	0	0	0	0	0	0
APOEL	2012–13	Cypriot First Division	0	0	0	0	0	0	—		0	0
Alki Larnaca (loan)	2013–14	Cypriot First Division	20	0	5	0	—		—		25	0
APOEL	2014–15	Cypriot First Division	1	0	2	0	0	0	0	0	3	0
APOEL	Total		1	0	2	0	0	0	0	0	3	0
Olympiakos Nicosia	2015–16	Cypriot Second Division	19	3	1	0	—		—		20	3
Career total			40	3	8	0	0	0	0	0	48	3

== Honours ==
APOEL

- Cypriot First Division (1): 2014–15
- Cypriot Cup (1): 2014–15
