= Urko Pardo =

Cypriot footballer

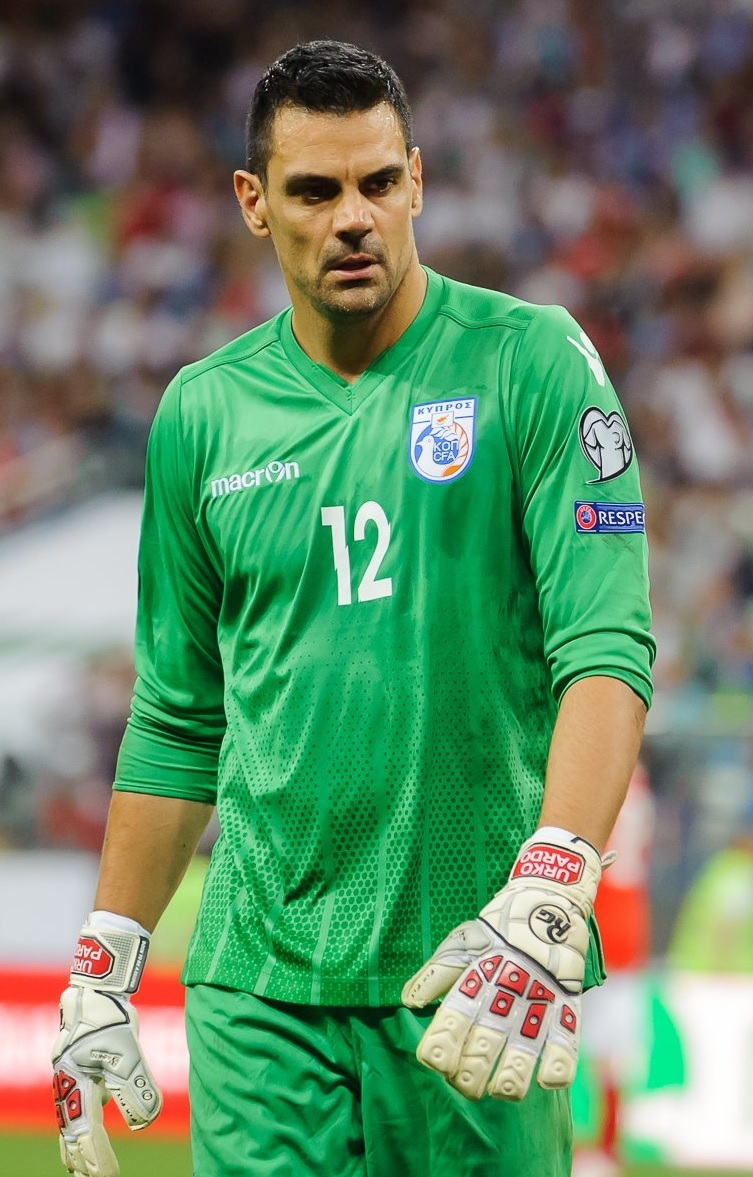
- Pardo with Cyprus in 2019

Personal information
- Full name: Urko Rafael Pardo Goas
- Date of birth: 28 January 1983 (age 43)
- Place of birth: Brussels, Belgium
- Height: 1.89 m (6 ft 2 in)
- Position: Goalkeeper

Youth career
- 1988–1999: Anderlecht
- 1999–2001: Barcelona

Senior career*
Years	Team	Apps	(Gls)
2001–2005	Barcelona C	80	(0)
2002–2007	Barcelona B	18	(0)
2005	→ Cartagena (loan)	0	(0)
2006	→ Sabadell (loan)	16	(0)
2007–2008	Iraklis	29	(0)
2008–2011	Rapid București	4	(0)
2009–2011	→ Olympiacos (loan)	29	(0)
2011–2017	APOEL	114	(0)
2017–2019	Alki Oroklini	57	(0)
2019–2020	Ermis Aradippou	20	(0)
2020–2021	Olympias Lympion	2	(0)
Total		362	(0)

International career^{‡}
2017–2020	Cyprus	9	(0)
- * Club domestic league appearances and goals as of 15:51, 21 May 2020 (UTC) ‡ National team caps and goals as of 13 October 2019

Urko Rafael Pardo Goas (Greek: Ούρκο Ράφαελ Πάρντο Γκόας; born 28 January 1983) is a former professional footballer who played as a goalkeeper.

Formed at Barcelona, he spent most of his career in the Cypriot First Division, mainly with APOEL with which he won eight titles including five league championships. He also competed professionally in Greece and Romania.

After being awarded citizenship, Pardo represented the Cyprus national team.

== Club career ==
=== Barcelona ===
Born in Brussels to a Basque father and a Galician mother, Pardo began his football career with R.S.C. Anderlecht, finishing his formation with FC Barcelona but never making it past its B-side. He split the 2005–06 season – always on loan – between FC Cartagena and CE Sabadell FC with both teams in the third division, suffering relegation with the latter.

=== Rapid București / Greece ===
In the summer of 2007, released by Barcelona, Pardo signed with Greece's Iraklis, moving the following year to FC Rapid București in Romania but appearing rarely in his first season.

In 2009–10, another loan ensued as Pardo moved to Olympiacos F.C. also in Greece, playing just three Super League games in his first year. The move was extended by Rapid for the following season, and he appeared more regularly (Olympiacos were seeking a replacement for the legendary Antonios Nikopolidis (40), who was set to retire in June 2011, and said the Spaniard would be a very good choice for succeeding him), being the most used player in his position.

=== Cyprus ===
In the last day of the 2011 summer transfer window, Pardo signed a two-year contract with Cyprus champions APOEL FC. He made his official debut on 19 October against FC Porto, replacing injured Dionisis Chiotis early into the second half of a 1–1 away draw in that season's UEFA Champions League, and added a further four appearances as the club reached the quarter-finals for the first time ever.

In 2014–15, Pardo appeared in every group stage match in APOEL's third Champions League campaign. On 26 May 2016 both parties agreed on a two-year contract extension, with an option for a third year.

On 2 September 2017, aged 34, free agent Pardo joined Alki Oroklini. On 23 August 2019, he moved to Cypriot Second Division team Ermis Aradippou FC. Pardo joined Cypriot Third Division team Olympias Lympion for the 2020–21 season.

== International career ==
In 2017, Pardo became a naturalized Cypriot citizen. He won his first cap on 13 November of that year at the age of 34, in a 3–2 away friendly defeat against Armenia.

== Career statistics ==
As of 27 September 2020

Appearances and goals by club, season and competition
Club	Season	League			National Cup		League Cup		Continental		Other (Note: Includes Cypriot Super Cup matches.)		Total	
Club	Season	Division	Apps	Goals	Apps	Goals	Apps	Goals	Apps	Goals	Apps	Goals	Apps	Goals
Barcelona B	2002–03	Segunda División B	1	0	0	0	—		—		—		1	0
Barcelona B	2004–05	Segunda División B	11	0	0	0	—		—		—		11	0
Barcelona B	2006–07	Segunda División B	6	0	0	0	—		—		—		6	0
Barcelona B	Total		18	0	0	0	0	0	0	0	—		18	0
Barcelona	2004–05	La Liga	0	0	0	0	—		0	0	—		0	0
Cartagena (loan)	2005–06	Segunda División B	0	0	0	0	—		—		—		0	0
Sabadell (loan)	2005–06	Segunda División B	16	0	0	0	—		—		—		16	0
Iraklis	2007–08	Super League Greece	29	0	0	0	—		—		—		29	0
Rapid București	2008–09	Liga I	4	0	0	0	—		1	0	—		5	0
Olympiacos (loan)	2009–10	Super League Greece	7	0	1	0	2	0	0	0	—		10	0
Olympiacos (loan)	2010–11	Super League Greece	22	0	1	0	0	0	1	0	—		24	0
Olympiacos (loan)	Total		29	0	2	0	2	0	1	0	—		34	0
APOEL	2011–12	Cypriot First Division	14	0	1	0	—		5	0	—		20	0
APOEL	2012–13	Cypriot First Division	27	0	0	0	—		0	0	—		27	0
APOEL	2013–14	Cypriot First Division	34	0	0	0	—		9	0	1	0	44	0
APOEL	2014–15	Cypriot First Division	20	0	3	0	—		10	0	0	0	33	0
APOEL	2015–16	Cypriot First Division	16	0	5	0	—		0	0	0	0	21	0
APOEL	2016–17	Cypriot First Division	2	0	7	0	—		0	0	1	0	10	0
APOEL	Total		114	0	16	0	—		24	0	1	0	155	0
Alki Oroklini	2017–18	Cypriot First Division	27	0	0	0	—		—		—		27	0
Alki Oroklini	2018–19	Cypriot First Division	30	0	0	0	—		—		—		30	0
Ermis Aradippou	2019–20	Cypriot Second Division	20	0	1	0	—		—		—		21	0
Olympias Lympion	2020–21	Cypriot Third Division	2	0	0	0	—		—		—		2	0
Career total			289	0	19	0	2	0	26	0	2	0	336	0

== Honours ==
Olympiacos

- Super League Greece: 2010–11

APOEL

- Cypriot First Division: 2012–13, 2013–14, 2014–15, 2015–16, 2016–17
- Cypriot Cup: 2013–14, 2014–15
- Cypriot Super Cup: 2013

Ermis Aradippou

- Cypriot Second Division: 2019–20
