= Anastasios Kissas =

Cypriot footballer (born 1988)

Personal information
- Full name: Anastasios Kissas
- Date of birth: 18 January 1988 (age 38)
- Place of birth: Nicosia, Cyprus
- Height: 1.82 m (6 ft 0 in)
- Position: Goalkeeper

Team information
- Current team: Olympiakos Nicosia
- Number: 28

Youth career
- APOEL

Senior career*
Years	Team	Apps	(Gls)
2005–2016	APOEL	18	(0)
2016–2019	Apollon Limassol	7	(0)
2019–2024	Nea Salamina	45	(0)
2024–2025	Olympiakos Nicosia	28	(0)

International career
2006–2010	Cyprus U21	9	(0)
2010–2021	Cyprus	13	(0)
- * Club domestic league appearances and goals as of 00:53, 9 May 2025 (UTC)

Anastasios Kissas (Greek: Αναστάσιος Κίσσας; born 18 January 1988) is a Cypriot international footballer who played as a goalkeeper for Olympiakos Nicosia.

== Career ==
=== APOEL ===
Kissas made his debut for APOEL in a domestic cup match in 2005 at the age of seventeen.

During his career with APOEL, Kissas won seven championships, four Cups and four Super Cups. He was also a member of APOEL squad when the club reached the 2009–10, 2014–15 UEFA Champions League group stages and the quarter-finals of the 2011–12 UEFA Champions League but he didn't appear in any single match.

On 26 May 2016, after ten years in the club, Kissas contract with APOEL was mutually terminated.

=== Apollon Limassol ===
On 1 June 2016, Kissas Joined fellow Cypriot First Division club Apollon Limassol on a one-year contract with the option of a further season.

== International career ==
Kiisas made his international debut with Cyprus on 16 November 2010, in a friendly match against Jordan at King Abdullah Stadium, coming on as a 54th-minute substitute in Cyprus' 0–0 draw.

== Honours ==
APOEL

- Cypriot First Division (7): 2006–07, 2008–09, 2010–11, 2012–13, 2013–14, 2014–15, 2015–16
- Cypriot Cup (4): 2005–06, 2007–08, 2013–14, 2014–15
- Cypriot Super Cup (4): 2008, 2009, 2011, 2013
