= Richard Emmanuel Njoh =

Cameroonian footballer

Emmanuel
Personal information
- Full name: Richard Emmanuel Njoh Edimo
- Date of birth: 17 January 1995 (age 31)
- Place of birth: Cameroon
- Height: 1.69 m (5 ft 7 in)
- Position: Midfielder

Team information
- Current team: TP Mazembe

Senior career*
Years	Team	Apps	(Gls)
2013–2014	Douala Athletic Club		
2014–2016	Doxa Katokopia	36	(1)
2016–2017	Pafos	0	(0)
2022–	TP Mazembe		

International career
2013–	Cameroon	2	(0)
- * Club domestic league appearances and goals as of 24 July 2017

Richard Emmanuel Njoh Edimo (born 17 January 1995) is a Cameroonian football player who plays for TP Mazembe
