= Marios Pechlivanis =

Cypriot footballer (born 1995)

Personal information
- Full name: Marios Pechlivanis
- Date of birth: May 23, 1995 (age 31)
- Place of birth: Nicosia, Cyprus
- Height: 1.78 m (5 ft 10 in)
- Position: Winger

Team information
- Current team: Olympiakos Nicosia
- Number: 23

Youth career
- 2009–2012: Olympiakos Nicosia

Senior career*
Years	Team	Apps	(Gls)
2012–2014	Olympiakos Nicosia	0	(0)
2012–2013	→ Ethnikos Assia (loan)	0	(0)
2013–2014	→ PAEEK FC (loan)	10	(0)
2014–2015	APOEL	1	(0)
2015–2016	Austria Wien II	12	(2)
2016–2018	Olympiakos Nicosia	58	(5)
2018–2019	AEL Limassol	0	(0)
2018–2019	→ Aris Limassol (loan)	29	(3)
2019–2020	Ayia Napa	20	(4)
2020–2023	Olympiakos Nicosia	85	(7)
2023–2026	Ethnikos Achna	91	(3)
2026–	Olympiakos Nicosia	1	(1)

International career
2015–2016	Cyprus U21	2	(2)
- * Club domestic league appearances and goals as of 30 August 2026

Marios Pechlivanis (Greek: Μάριος Πεχλιβάνης, born 23 May 1995) is a Cypriot footballer, who plays for Olympiakos Nicosia.
