= Hélder Sousa =

Portuguese footballer (born 1977)

Personal information
- Full name: Hélder Bruno Macedo Sousa
- Date of birth: 13 October 1977 (age 49)
- Place of birth: Matosinhos, Portugal
- Height: 1.76 m (5 ft 9 1/2 in)
- Position: Midfielder

Youth career
- 1987–1991: Boavista
- 1991–1993: Gatões
- 1993–1994: Leixões
- 1994–1996: Senhora da Hora

Senior career*
| Years | Team | Apps | (Gls) |
| 1996–1997 | Imperial Sobreirense | | |
| 1997–1998 | Padroense | | |
| 1998–2000 | Trofense | 44 | (3) |
| 2000–2003 | Braga B | 76 | (13) |
| 2002 | Braga | 1 | (0) |
| 2003 | Ovarense | 16 | (1) |
| 2003–2004 | Gondomar | 34 | (7) |
| 2004–2005 | Feirense | 14 | (1) |
| 2005–2009 | Vizela | 113 | (9) |
| 2009–2010 | Trofense | 24 | (1) |
| 2010–2012 | Olympiakos Nicosia | 44 | (4) |
| 2012–2013 | APOEL | 17 | (1) |
| 2013–2016 | Trofense | 108 | (22) |
| 2016 | Pedras Rubras | 11 | (2) |
| 2016–2017 | Trofense | 29 | (2) |
| 2017–2018 | Merelinense | 27 | (4) |
| 2018–2019 | Rio Ave U23 | 7 | (0) |
| 2018–2019 | Rio Ave B | 3 | (0) |
| 2019–2020 | Trofense | 14 | (2) |
| Total | | 582 | (72) |
- * Club domestic league appearances and goals

Hélder Bruno Macedo Sousa (born 13 October 1977) is a Portuguese former professional footballer who played as a midfielder.

== Club career ==
Born in Matosinhos, Sousa started his career with amateurs Padroense F.C. in 1997. In his country, in which he competed almost exclusively in the second and third divisions, he also represented C.D. Trofense (two spells), S.C. Braga's reserves, A.D. Ovarense, Gondomar SC, C.D. Feirense and F.C. Vizela. On 15 September 2002, whilst with Braga, he made his only Primeira Liga appearance, which consisted of 20 minutes as a starter in a 2–0 away loss against Varzim SC.

In the summer of 2010, aged nearly 33, Sousa moved abroad for the first time, joining Cypriot club Olympiakos Nicosia. On 10 January 2012 he signed an 18-month contract with fellow First Division team APOEL FC, for a transfer fee of €90,000. He made his official debut six days later, playing 23 minutes in a 0–0 home draw with his former employers.

Sousa made his UEFA Champions League debut on 14 February 2012 at the age of 34, featuring 72 minutes in a 1–0 defeat at Olympique Lyonnais in the round of 16. He added a further two appearances, as the side reached the quarter-finals for the first time ever.

On 29 January 2013, Sousa's contract with APOEL was terminated by mutual consent. The following day, he returned to his homeland and signed for two years with former club Trofense.

Sousa played well into his 40s, always in lower-league or amateur football.
