= Jesús Vera =

Argentine footballer

Personal information
- Full name: Jesús Jonathan Vera
- Date of birth: 10 September 1989 (age 37)
- Place of birth: Godoy Cruz, Argentina
- Height: 1.87 m (6 ft 2 in)
- Position: Forward

Team information
- Current team: Gutiérrez
- Number: 20

Senior career*
Years	Team	Apps	(Gls)
2008–2014	Godoy Cruz	22	(2)
2011	→ Huachipato (loan)	20	(6)
2013	→ Defensa y Justicia (loan)	0	(0)
2013–2014	→ San Jorge (loan)	24	(7)
2014–2015	Othellos Athienou	28	(2)
2015–2016	Cipolletti	22	(3)
2016–2017	San Jorge	24	(9)
2017–2018	Juventud Unida Universitario	24	(2)
2018–2019	Deportivo Maipú	15	(4)
2019–2020	Crucero del Norte	12	(1)
2020–2021	San Martín Mendoza	13	(4)
2021	Sol de Mayo	25	(5)
2022	Juventud Unida Universitario	30	(5)
2023	FADEP	–	(–)
2023	Puntarenas	13	(2)
2024–	Gutiérrez	13	(2)
- * Club domestic league appearances and goals as of 13 August 2024

Jesús Jonathan Vera (born 10 January 1989) is an Argentine footballer who plays as a forward for Gutiérrez.

== Career ==
A forward, Vera has played in Argentina, Chile, Cyprus and Costa Rica.

In Chile, Vera played for Huachipato in 2011 on loan from Godoy Cruz.

In 2014–15, Vera played for Cypriot club Othellos Athienou.

In the second half of 2023, Vera moved to Costa Rica and joined Puntarenas. Back to Argentina, he joined Gutiérrez.
