= Thiago Santos (footballer, born 1984) =

Brazilian footballer

Personal information
- Full name: Thiago "Ricelly" dos Santos Ferreira
- Date of birth: 14 May 1984 (age 42)
- Place of birth: Rio de Janeiro, Brazil
- Height: 1.74 m (5 ft 9 in)
- Position: Second striker

Team information
- Current team: Cianorte

Senior career*
Years	Team	Apps	(Gls)
?–2007	Coritiba B	10	(2)
2007	J. Malucelli	12	(4)
2008	Rio Claro	10	(3)
2008	Icasa	13	(3)
2008	Sousa	12	(5)
2008–2009	Tubize	15	(8)
2010	Guarani	8	(2)
2010	AEP Paphos	14	(5)
2011	Cianorte	21	(8)
2011	→ Paraná (loan)	20	(8)
2012	Cianorte	12	(2)
2013	Bragantino	15	(7)
2013	Hermann Aichinger	12	(7)
2013	Cuiabá	20	(9)
2014	J. Malucelli	13	(8)
2014	Guarany de Sobral	8	(6)
2014–2015	Oriente Petrolero	37	(6)
2016–2017	Sport Boys Warnes	6	(0)
2017	Rio Branco	7	(0)
2017	Nacional Potosí	22	(3)
2018	Estanciano	0	(0)
2019	Cianorte	1	(0)
- * Club domestic league appearances and goals as of 8 March 2018

Thiago dos Santos Ferreira (born 14 May 1984), or simply Thiago Santos, is a Brazilian footballer who last played for Cianorte.
