= Marcelo Oliveira (footballer, born 1981) =

Brazilian footballer

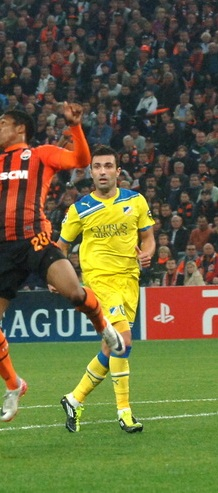
- Marcelo José Oliveira (2011)

Personal information
- Full name: Marcelo José Oliveira
- Date of birth: 5 September 1981 (age 45)
- Place of birth: Santa Rita do Sapucaí, Brazil
- Height: 1.85 m (6 ft 1 in)
- Position: Defender

Senior career*
Years	Team	Apps	(Gls)
2004	Corinthians	7	(0)
2005	Grêmio	28	(1)
2006–2011	Atromitos	117	(8)
2011–2014	APOEL	64	(2)
2014–2017	Moreirense	64	(1)
2017–2018	Santa Clara	22	(0)
- * Club domestic league appearances and goals

Marcelo José Oliveira (born 5 September 1981), commonly known as Marcelo Oliveira, is a former Brazilian football defender.

== Club career ==
=== Corinthians / Grêmio ===
Oliveira started his career at Brazil, where he played for Corinthians and Grêmio.

=== Atromitos ===
In 2006, he moved to the Greek club Atromitos and he stayed at the club for five seasons, appearing in 117 matches and scoring 8 goals.

=== APOEL ===
On 9 June 2011, he signed a two-years contract with the Cypriot club APOEL. In his first season at the club, he won the Cypriot Super Cup and appeared in eight 2011–12 UEFA Champions League matches for APOEL, in the club's surprising run to the quarter-finals of the competition. He became a champion for the first time in his career after winning the 2012–13 Cypriot First Division with APOEL. During the 2013–14 season, he appeared in five 2013–14 UEFA Europa League group stage matches for APOEL and won all the titles in Cyprus, the Cypriot League, the Cypriot Cup and the Cypriot Super Cup.

=== Moreirense ===
On 14 July 2014, he signed a one-year contract with the Portuguese side Moreirense.

== Honours ==
APOEL

- Cypriot First Division (2) : 2012–13, 2013–14
- Cypriot Cup (1) : 2013–14
- Cypriot Super Cup (2) : 2011, 2013

Moreirense

- Taça da Liga (1): 2016–17
