= 2014–15 Cypriot Cup =

Tournament details
- Country: Cyprus
- Dates: 29 October 2014 – 20 May 2015
- Teams: 26

Final positions
- Champions: APOEL (21st title)
- Runners-up: AEL

Tournament statistics
- Matches played: 39
- Goals scored: 110 (2.82 per match)
- Attendance: 56,681 (1,453 per match)
- Top goal scorer(s): André Schembri (6 goals)
- All statistics correct as of 20 May 2015.

The 2014–15 Cypriot Cup was the 73rd edition of the Cypriot Cup. A total of 26 clubs entered the competition. It began on 29 October 2014 with the first round and concluded on 20 May 2015 with the final which was held at GSZ Stadium. APOEL clinched their 21st Cypriot Cup trophy and their second in successive seasons with a convincing 4–2 victory over AEL Limassol.

== Format ==
In the 2014–15 Cypriot Cup, participated all the teams of the Cypriot First Division and the Cypriot Second Division (Divisions B1 and B2). Teams from the two lower divisions (Third and Fourth) competed in a separate cup competition.

The competition consisted of five rounds. In the first round each tie was played as a single leg and was held at the home ground of one of the two teams, according to the draw results. Each tie winner was qualifying to the next round. If a match was drawn, extra time was following. If extra time was drawn, there was a replay at the ground of the team who were away for the first game. If the rematch was also drawn, then extra time was following and if the match remained drawn after extra time the winner was decided by penalty shoot-out.

The next three rounds were played in a two-legged format, each team playing a home and an away match against their opponent. The team which scored more goals on aggregate, was qualifying to the next round. If the two teams scored the same number of goals on aggregate, then the team which scored more goals away from home was advancing to the next round.

If both teams had scored the same number of home and away goals, then extra time was following after the end of the second leg match. If during the extra thirty minutes both teams had managed to score, but they had scored the same number of goals, then the team who scored the away goals was advancing to the next round (i.e. the team which was playing away). If there weren't scored any goals during extra time, the qualifying team was determined by penalty shoot-out.

The final was a single match.

The cup winner secured a place in the 2015–16 UEFA Europa League.

== First round ==
The first round draw took place on 16 October 2014 and the matches played on 29 October and 5 November 2014.

29 October 2014	Pafos FC	0−3	Othellos Athienou	Geroskipou Municipality Stadium, Geroskipou
14:00 EET			Thiago 45'; Vera 49'; Grigalashvili 59'	Attendance: 100; Referee: Marios Nicolaou

29 October 2014	ENAD Polis Chrysochous	2−4	Anorthosis	Polis Chrysochous Municipal Stadium, Polis Chrysochous
14:00 EET	Opara 32'; Pikramenos 52'		Laifis 43'; Yakovenko 65', 83'; Calvo 75'	Attendance: 477; Referee: Giorgos Karavellas

29 October 2014	AEZ Zakakiou	2−3	Doxa Katokopias	Zakaki Municipal Stadium, Zakaki
14:00 EET	Vasiliou 70'; Kyprou 87'		Emmanuel 40', 90+5'; Ramos 45'	Attendance: 50; Referee: Avraam Tsoukkas

29 October 2014	Ayia Napa	3−1	Enosis Neon Parekklisia	Tasos Markou Stadium, Paralimni
14:00 EET	dos Santos 20'; Messios 32'; Kolokoudias 58'		Efstathiou 34'	Attendance: 50; Referee: Christos Elia

29 October 2014	Elpida Xylofagou	1−4	Nea Salamina	Michalonikion Stadium, Xylofagou
14:00 EET	Avraam 49'		Chidi 16'; Okeuhie 22'; Lambropoulos 37'; Gleison 45'	Attendance: 250; Referee: Costas Nicolaou

29 October 2014	Karmiotissa	2−1	Enosis Neon Paralimni	Pano Polemidia Municipal Stadium, Pano Polemidia
14:00 EET	Pastellis 28'; Louka 38'		Kyprianou 21' (pen.)	Attendance: 400; Referee: Andreas Orthodoxou

29 October 2014	APEP	0−1	Olympiakos Nicosia	Kyperounda Municipal Stadium, Kyperounta
14:00 EET			Vasiliades 71'	Referee: Nikolas Neokleous

29 October 2014	Nikos & Sokratis Erimis	3−4 (a.e.t.)	Anagennisi Deryneia	Erimi Municipal Stadium, Erimi
14:00 EET	Constantinides 23'; Bangura 32', 61'		Chatzipantelidis 53', 70' (pen.); Modestou 88'; Vasiliou 120'	Referee: Savvas Zafiris

29 October 2014	Digenis Oroklinis	0−0 (a.e.t.) (4–2 p)	Omonia Aradippou	Oroklini Municipal Stadium, Oroklini
15:00 EET				Referee: Antonis Christodoulou
	Penalties
	Penalty scored		Penalty scored Penalty missed

5 November 2014	Ethnikos Achna	3−0	Aris Limassol	Dasaki Stadium, Achna
14:00 EET	Atanda 3'; Jone 11'; Pincelli 38' (pen.)

== Second round ==
The second round draw took place on 11 December 2014 and the matches played on 7, 14, 28 January 2015 and on 4 February 2015.

The following six teams advanced directly to second round, meeting the ten winners of first round ties:

- APOEL (2013–14 Cypriot Cup winner)
- Ermis Aradippou (2013–14 Cypriot Cup finalist)
- AEL Limassol (2013–14 Cypriot First Division runners-up)
- Apollon Limassol (2013–14 Cypriot First Division 3rd placed team)
- Omonia (2013–14 Cypriot First Division 5th placed team)
- AEK Larnaca (2013–14 Cypriot First Division Fair Play winner)

Team 1	Agg.	Team 2	1st leg	2nd leg
AEK Larnaca	2–0	Nea Salamina	1–0	1–0
Doxa Katokopias	1–5	Ermis Aradippou	1–3	0–2
Omonia	9–0	Ayia Napa	4–0	5–0
Apollon Limassol	2–3	Othellos Athienou	1–1	1–2
Digenis Oroklinis	1–4	Anorthosis	1–2	0–2
Karmiotissa	3–1	Anagennisi Deryneia	2–1	1–0
Olympiakos Nicosia	0–4	APOEL	0–1	0–3
AEL Limassol	3–2	Ethnikos Achna	1–0	2–2

== Quarter-finals ==
The quarter-finals draw took place on 27 January 2015 and the matches played on 11 and 18 February 2015 and on 4 and 11 March 2015.

Team 1	Agg.	Team 2	1st leg	2nd leg
Othellos Athienou	1–5	AEK Larnaca	1–1	0–4
AEL Limassol	2–1	Ermis Aradippou	1–0	1–1
Omonia	7–0	Karmiotissa	2–0	5–0
Anorthosis	0–2	APOEL	0–0	0–2

== Semi-finals ==
The semi-finals draw took place on 24 March 2015 and the matches played on 8 and 22 April 2015.

Team 1	Agg.	Team 2	1st leg	2nd leg
AEK Larnaca	3–3 (a)	AEL Limassol	2–2	1–1
APOEL	3–0	Omonia	3–0	0–0

=== First leg ===
8 April 2015	APOEL	3–0	Omonia	GSP Stadium, Nicosia
17:00 EET	Lanig 36'; Riise 39'; De Vincenti 78'	Report		Attendance: 9,188; Referee: Charalambos Skapoullis

8 April 2015	AEK Larnaca	2–2	AEL Limassol	GSZ Stadium, Larnaca
19:00 EET	Mendy 32' (o.g.); Kanté 66'	Report	Sema 47', 89'	Attendance: 3,649; Referee: Leontios Trattou

=== Second leg ===
22 April 2015	Omonia	0–0 (0–3 agg.)	APOEL	GSP Stadium, Nicosia
17:00 EET		Report		Attendance: 4,206; Referee: Leontios Trattou

22 April 2015	AEL Limassol	1–1 (3–3a agg.)	AEK Larnaca	Tsirion Stadium, Limassol
18:00 EET	Sardinero 41'	Report	Joan Tomàs 33'	Attendance: 4,849; Referee: Christos Nicolaides

== Final ==
20 May 2015
19:00 EET

APOEL	4–2	AEL Limassol
Lanig (yellow card) 21'; Chiotis (yellow card) 27'; De Vincenti 31'; Efrem 45', 53'; Riise 60'	Report 1 Report 2	Sema 11'; Carlitos (yellow card) 58'; Guidileye (yellow card) 87'; Sielis 90'

GSZ Stadium, Larnaca
Attendance: 10,177
Referee: (Czech Republic) Pavel Královec

APOEL	AEL Limassol

Cypriot Cup 2014–15 Winners
APOEL
21st Title

== See also ==
- Cypriot Cup
- 2014–15 Cypriot First Division
- 2014–15 Cypriot Second Division

== Sources ==
- Official website (in Greek)
- "2014/15 Cyprus Cup". Rec.Sport.Soccer Statistics Foundation. 2016-01-14.
