= 2008–09 APOEL FC season =

APOEL
2008–09 season
- Chairman: Kyriakos Zivanaris (Until 30 October 2008); Phivos Erotokritou (From 30 October 2008)
- Manager: Ivan Jovanović
- Stadium: GSP Stadium, Nicosia
- Cypriot First Division: Winners
- Cypriot Cup: Semi-finals
- LTV Super Cup: Winners
- UEFA Cup: First round
- Top goalscorer: League: Marcin Żewłakow (11); All: Benjamin Onwuachi (12); Marcin Żewłakow (12)
- Highest home attendance: 18,769 vs Omonia (20 October 2008)
- Lowest home attendance: 2,032 vs Doxa (21 January 2009)
- Average home league attendance: 7,474 (all competitions)
Home colours	Away colours	Third colours

The 2008–09 season was APOEL's 69th season in the Cypriot First Division and 81st year in existence as a football club.

The first training session for the season took take place at the training ground at GSP Stadium on 11 June 2008. APOEL left on 20 June 2008 for Obertraun in Austria to perform the main stage of their pre-season training and returned to Cyprus on 7 July 2008.

The team finished 2nd in the league in the previous season so the club participated in the UEFA Cup.

On 30 October 2008, Kyriakos Zivanaris (the chairman of APOEL since 2006) resigned and he was replaced by Phivos Erotokritou.

The team won their 20th championship two rounds before the end after an away draw against Anorthosis on 25 April 2009. The draw also put an end to a 16-game winning streak that started on 21 December 2008 on the away game against Doxa Katokopias.

== Current squad ==
Last Update: March 15, 2008

Note: Flags indicate national team as defined under FIFA eligibility rules; some limited exceptions apply. Players may hold more than one non-FIFA nationality.

No.	Pos.	Nation	Player
1	GK	CYP	Michalis Morfis
4	DF	CYP	Paraskevas Christou
5	DF	ROU	Daniel Florea
6	MF	CYP	Demetris Kyriakou
7	DF	GRE	Savvas Poursaitides
8	DF	FRA	Bark Seghiri
10	MF	CYP	Constantinos Charalambides
11	MF	POL	Kamil Kosowski
14	DF	NED	Joost Broerse
15	DF	CYP	Marios Antoniades
17	MF	CYP	Marinos Satsias (captain)
19	DF	CYP	Marios Elia
20	MF	BRA	Jean Paulista
21	FW	POL	Marcin Żewłakow

No.	Pos.	Nation	Player
22	GK	GRE	Dionisis Chiotis
23	MF	POR	Helio Pinto
24	DF	GRE	Christos Kontis
26	MF	POR	Nuno Morais
29	MF	CYP	Nektarios Alexandrou
30	FW	SRB	Nenad Mirosavljević
32	DF	ALB	Altin Haxhi
33	MF	CYP	Chrysis Michael
40	MF	CYP	Giorgos Economides
60	GK	CYP	Kyriacos Ioannou
71	MF	CYP	Marios Theodorou
80	FW	NGR	Benjamin Onwuachi
88	GK	CYP	Tasos Kissas

For recent transfers, see List of Cypriot football transfers summer 2008.
Also, see List of Cypriot football transfers winter 2008–09.

=== Squad changes ===
In:

No.	Pos.	Nat.	Name	Age	EU	Moving from	Type	Transfer window	Ends	Transfer fee	Source
7	RB	(Greece)	Poursaitides	31	EU	Anorthosis Famagusta	Transfer ✓	Summer	2010	Free	24sports.com.cy
19	RB	(Cyprus)	Elia	29	EU	Ethnikos Achna	Loan return →	Summer	2009	—	—
21	CF	(Poland)	Żewłakow	32	EU	Dender (Belgium)	Transfer ✓	Summer	2010	Free	kerkida.net
9	CF	(Cyprus)	Papathanasiou	24	EU	Ermis Aradippou	Transfer ✓	Summer	2010	Free	—
4	CB	(Cyprus)	Christou	24	EU	AEK Larnaca	Transfer ✓	Summer	2012	€120K	sigmalive.com
22	GK	(Greece)	Chiotis	31	EU	Kerkyra (Greece)	Transfer ✓	Summer	2010	Free	kerkida.net
20	AM	(Brazil)	Paulista	30	EU	Wisła Kraków (Poland)	Transfer ✓	Summer	2010	Free	kerkida.net
6	DM	(Cyprus)	Kyriakou	21	EU	Digenis Morphou	Loan return →	Summer	2009	—	—
11	RW	(Poland)	Kosowski	30	EU	Cádiz (Spain)	Transfer ✓	Summer	2010	Free	apoelfc.com.cy
80	CF	(Nigeria)	Onwuachi	24	Non-EU	Ionikos (Greece)	Loan →	Summer	2009	€200K	apoelfc.com.cy
29	LW	(Cyprus)	Alexandrou	24	EU	Larissa (Greece)	Transfer ✓	Summer	2011	Free	apoelfc.com.cy
16	AM	(Portugal)	Paulo Costa	29	EU	Anorthosis Famagusta	Loan →	Winter	2009	Free	apoelfc.com.cy

Total expenditure: ▼€320K

Out:

No.	Pos.	Nat.	Name	Age	EU	Moving to	Type	Transfer window	Transfer fee	Source
9	CF	(Greece)	Machlas	34	EU	Retirement	Retirement 🔨	Summer	—	contra.gr
20	RW	(Cyprus)	Makrides	26	EU	Metalurh Donetsk (Ukraine)	End of contract ✗	Summer	Free	kerkida.net
69	CF	(Serbia)	Čorović	32	Non-EU	AEL Limassol	Loan return →	Summer	—	—
11	RW	(Cyprus)	Louka	25	EU	AEL Limassol	End of contract ✗	Summer	Free	kerkida.net
4	CB	(Greece)	Kapsis	34	EU	Levadiakos (Greece)	End of contract ✗	Summer	Free	—
18	CB	(Cyprus)	Daskalakis	30	EU	AEK Larnaca	End of contract ✗	Summer	Free	apoel.net
31	CF	(Brazil)	Zé Carlos	33	EU	Trofense (Portugal)	Contract termination ✗	Summer	Free	apoelfc.com.cy
28	CF	(Cyprus)	Vourkou	22	EU	Doxa Katokopias	Loan →	Summer	Free	—
77	RB	(Cyprus)	Panayiotou	19	EU	Digenis Morphou	Loan →	Summer	Free	—
12	GK	(North Macedonia)	Nikolovski	35	Non-EU	AEP Paphos	Mutual consent ✗	Winter	Free	—
9	CF	(Cyprus)	Papathanasiou	25	EU	Ermis Aradippou	Loan →	Winter	Free	—
16	AM	(Portugal)	Paulo Costa	29	EU	Anorthosis Famagusta	Mutual consent ✗ Loan return →	Winter	Free	apoelfc.com.cy

Total income: ▲€0

Last updated: March 13, 2009

== Player stats ==
Last update: May 10, 2009

No.	Pos.	Name	Marfin Laiki League		Cypriot Cup		UEFA Cup		LTV Super Cup		Total		Discipline	
No.	Pos.	Name	Apps	Goals	Apps	Goals	Apps	Goals	Apps	Goals	Apps	Goals	Yellow card	Red card
1	GK	(Cyprus) Michalis Morfis	4	0	1	0	2	0	1	0	8	0	0	0
4	DF	(Cyprus) Paraskevas Christou	10	2	3	0	3	0	1	0	17	2	3	0
5	DF	(Romania) Daniel Florea	12	0	4	0	4	0	1	0	21	0	1	0
6	MF	(Cyprus) Demetris Kyriakou	2	0	2	0	0	0	0	0	4	0	0	0
7	DF	(Greece) Savvas Poursaitidis	27	0	2	0	4	0	1	0	34	0	5	0
8	DF	(France) Bark Seghiri	14	1	5	0	4	0	0	0	23	1	3	0
9	FW	(Cyprus) Andreas Papathanasiou	3	0	0	0	2	0	0	0	5	0	0	0
10	MF	(Cyprus) Constantinos Charalambides	24	4	4	1	6	0	1	0	35	5	6	0
11	MF	(Poland) Kamil Kosowski	24	3	5	1	4	1	1	1	34	6	3	0
12	GK	(North Macedonia) Jane Nikolovski	0	0	0	0	0	0	0	0	0	0	0	0
14	DF	(Netherlands) Joost Broerse	31	2	5	0	5	1	0	0	41	3	4	0
15	DF	(Cyprus) Marios Antoniades	0	0	0	0	0	0	0	0	0	0	0	0
16	MF	(Portugal) Paulo Costa	5	2	2	0	0	0	0	0	7	2	1	0
17	MF	(Cyprus) Marinos Satsias(c)	16	2	3	0	0	0	0	0	19	2	3	0
19	DF	(Cyprus) Marios Elia	15	1	3	0	1	0	1	0	20	1	3	0
20	MF	(Brazil) Jean Paulista	0	0	0	0	4	0	1	0	5	0	0	0
21	FW	(Poland) Marcin Żewłakow	24	11	6	0	5	1	1	0	36	12	1	0
22	GK	(Greece) Dionisis Chiotis	28	0	5	0	5	0	0	0	38	0	2	1
23	MF	(Portugal) Helio Pinto	27	2	5	1	5	2	1	0	38	5	8	1
24	DF	(Greece) Christos Kontis	28	2	4	1	5	0	0	0	37	3	3	0
26	MF	(Portugal) Nuno Morais	30	3	5	0	6	0	1	0	42	3	7	0
29	MF	(Cyprus) Nektarios Alexandrou	28	5	5	1	2	0	0	0	35	6	5	0
30	FW	(Serbia) Nenad Mirosavljević	25	8	4	1	5	2	1	0	35	11	3	0
32	DF	(Albania) Altin Haxhi	18	0	2	0	4	0	1	0	25	0	9	0
33	MF	(Cyprus) Chrysis Michael	23	6	2	0	5	1	1	0	31	7	3	0
40	MF	(Cyprus) Giorgos Economides	0	0	0	0	0	0	0	0	0	0	0	0
60	GK	(Cyprus) Kyriacos Ioannou	0	0	0	0	0	0	0	0	0	0	0	0
71	MF	(Cyprus) Marios Theodorou	0	0	0	0	0	0	0	0	0	0	0	0
80	FW	(Nigeria) Benjamin Onwuachi	24	8	6	4	3	0	1	0	34	12	1	0
88	GK	(Cyprus) Tasos Kissas	1	0	0	0	0	0	0	0	1	0	0	0

== Club ==
=== Management ===
Position	Staff
Manager	(Serbia) (Greece) Ivan Jovanović
Assistant manager	(Cyprus) Yiannos Ioannou
First team coach/Scout	(Serbia) Predrag Erak
Goalkeeping coach	(Albania) Foto Strakosha
Fitness coach	(Cyprus) Giorgos Paraskeva
Team doctor	(Cyprus) Costas Schizas

Last updated: November 21, 2008
Source: apoelfc.com.cy

=== Kit ===
Supplier: Lotto
Sponsor(s): MTN

Home	Away	Third

Source: apoelfc.com.cy

=== Other information ===
Chairman	(Cyprus) Kyriakos Zivanaris (Until 30 October 2008) (Cyprus) Phivos Erotokritou (From 30 October 2008)
Ground (capacity and dimensions)	GSP Stadium (22,859 / 105x68 m)

Source: apoelfc.com.cy

== Preseason friendlies ==
APOEL left on 20 June 2008 for Obertraun in Austria, to perform the main stage of their pre-season training. The team returned to Cyprus on 7 July 2008. During the pre-season training stage in Austria, APOEL played four friendly matches.

2008-06-25

APOEL (Cyprus)	1 – 0	(Austria) SV Grödig
Papathanasiou 28'	(Report)

Obertraun, Austria

2008-06-28

APOEL (Cyprus)	1 – 0	(Ukraine) FC Metalurh Zaporizhya
Michael 27' (pen.)	(Report)

Obertraun, Austria

2008-07-02

APOEL (Cyprus)	0 – 1 Abandoned (Note: Match abandoned (at 0–1) after 77 minutes due to bad weather conditions.)	(Romania) FC Argeş Piteşti
	(Report)	Tameş 25'

Obertraun, Austria

2008-07-05

APOEL (Cyprus)	2 – 2	(Hungary) FC Fehérvár
Żewłakow 6'; Charalambides 45'	(Report)	Nagy 60' (pen.); Pavličić 90'

Obertraun, Austria

2008-07-26

APOEL (Cyprus)	4 – 1	(Cyprus) Omonia Aradippou
Michael; Mirosavljević; Kosowski; Elia (pen.)	(Report)	Iakovou (pen.)

GSP Stadium, Nicosia
Attendance: Behind closed doors

2008-08-07

AEK Larnaca (Cyprus)	1 – 2	(Cyprus) APOEL
Monesterolo 90'	(Report)	Żewłakow 54'; Elia 71' (pen.)

Neo GSZ Stadium, Larnaca
Attendance: 3,000

== Mid-season friendlies ==
2008-10-11

PAEEK (Cyprus)	0 – 5	(Cyprus) APOEL
		Onwuachi,, Mirosavljević; Haxhi

Keryneia Epistrofi, Lakatamia
Attendance: 500

== Competitions ==
=== Overall ===
Competition	Started round	Final position / round	First match	Last match
Marfin Laiki League	—	Winners	1 September 2008	10 May 2009
UEFA Cup	1st qualifying	1st round	17 July 2008	2 October 2008
Cypriot Cup	2nd round	Semi-final	21 January 2009	6 May 2009
LTV Super Cup	Final	Winners	23 August 2008	

Updated to match played 20 May 2009
Source: Competitions

=== Marfin Laiki League ===
==== Classification ====
Pos	Team	Pld	W	D	L	GF	GA	GD	Pts	Qualification or relegation
1	APOEL	26	22	3	1	53	14	+39	69	Qualification for second round, Group A
2	Omonia Nicosia	26	21	1	4	61	18	+43	64	Qualification for second round, Group A
3	Anorthosis Famagusta	26	20	2	4	49	19	+30	62	Qualification for second round, Group A
4	AEL Limassol	26	13	4	9	34	30	+4	43 (Note: AEL 1–0 APOL; APOL 1–3 AEL)	Qualification for second round, Group A
5	Apollon Limassol	26	13	4	9	53	34	+19	43	Qualification for second round, Group B

Source: cfa.com.cy (in Greek)
Rules for classification: 1) points; 2) head-to-head points; 3) head-to-head goal difference; 4) head-to-head goals scored; 5) goal difference; 6) number of goals scored.
Teams qualified for Group A played out one spot in the second qualifying round of the UEFA Champions League and two spots in the UEFA Europa League, one in the second and one in the first qualifying round.
A spot in the third qualifying round of UEFA Europa League was awarded to the winners of the 2008–09 Cypriot Cup.
Teams qualified for Group C played out one additional relegation spot.
Points gained in the First round were taken over into the Second round groups.

==== Results summary ====
Overall								Home						Away					
Pld	W	D	L	GF	GA	GD	Pts	W	D	L	GF	GA	GD	W	D	L	GF	GA	GD
32	26	4	2	62	17	+45	82	15	0	1	42	8	+34	11	4	1	20	9	+11

Last updated: May 25, 2009.
Source: soccerway.com

==== Results by round ====
Round	1	2	3	4	5	6	7	8	9	10	11	12	13	14	15	16	17	18	19	20	21	22	23	24	25	26	27	28	29	30	31	32
Ground	H	A	H	A	H	A	H	A	H	A	H	H	A	A	H	A	H	A	H	A	H	A	H	A	A	H	A	A	H	A	H	H
Result	W	D	W	D	W	W	W	L	W	W	W	W	D	W	W	W	W	W	W	W	W	W	W	W	W	W	W	W	W	D	W	P

Updated to match(es) played on May 25, 2009. Source: apoelfc.com.cy
A = Away; H = Home; W = Win; D = Draw; L = Loss; P = Postponed

==== Playoffs table ====
The first 12 teams are divided into 3 groups. Points are carried over from the first round.

==== Group A ====
Pos	Team	Pld	W	D	L	GF	GA	GD	Pts	Qualification
1	APOEL (C)	32	26	4	2	62	17	+45	82	Qualification for Champions League second qualifying round
2	Omonia Nicosia	32	25	1	6	70	22	+48	76	Qualification for Europa League second qualifying round
3	Anorthosis Famagusta	32	21	4	7	52	26	+26	67	Qualification for Europa League first qualifying round
4	AEL Limassol	32	13	5	14	38	41	−3	44	

Source: cfa.com.cy (in Greek)
Rules for classification: 1) points; 2) head-to-head points; 3) head-to-head goal difference; 4) head-to-head goals scored; 5) goal difference; 6) number of goals scored.
(C) Champions

=== Matches ===
All times for the Domestic Competitions at EET

==== Regular season ====
2008-09-01
19:00

APOEL	3 – 2	Doxa
Michael 25'; Christou 29'; Morais 40'	(report)	Serjão 3'; Saavedra 45'; Rodrigues (red card) 84'

GSP Stadium, Nicosia
Attendance: 6,736
Referee: Panayiotis Gerasimou

2008-09-12
19:30

Ethnikos Achnas	1 – 1	APOEL
Alekou 58'	(report)	Charalambides 51'

Dasaki Stadium, Achna
Attendance: 1,623
Referee: Charis Glykis

2008-09-21
19:00

APOEL	4 – 0	AEL
Morais 13'; Charalambides 24'; Christou 40'; Pinto 64'	(report)

GSP Stadium, Nicosia
Attendance: 8,124
Referee: Panayiotis Gerasimou

2008-09-28
19:00

AE Paphos	2 – 2	APOEL
Ba 19'; Chailis 52'	(report)	Żewłakow 15'; Charalambides 17'

Pafiako Stadium, Paphos
Attendance: 2,923
Referee: Costas Kapitanis

2008-10-20
19:30

APOEL	3 – 2	Omonia
Onwuachi 3', 18'; Charalambides 37'	(report)	Okkas 11' (pen.); Aloneftis 58'

GSP Stadium, Nicosia
Attendance: 18,769
Referee: Panayiotis Gerasimou

2008-10-25
19:00

APOP Kinyras	1 – 2	APOEL
Mykhailenko 12'	(report)	Onwuachi 43'; Elia 45' (pen.)

Peyia Municipal Stadium, Pegeia
Attendance: 1,136
Referee: Panikos Andronikou

2008-11-01
19:00

APOEL	1 – 0	EN Paralimni
Onwuachi 11'	(report)

GSP Stadium, Nicosia
Attendance: 5,608
Referee: Leontios Trattos

2008-11-09
18:00

Alki	1 – 0	APOEL
Rouga 88'	(report)

Ammochostos Stadium, Larnaca
Attendance: 1,845
Referee: Panikos Kailis

2008-11-15
19:00

APOEL	4 – 1	Apollon
Mirosavljević 45'; Onwuachi 48' 55'; Alexandrou 90'	(report)	Sangoy 59', (red card) 61'

GSP Stadium, Nicosia
Attendance: 7,794
Referee: Panayiotis Gerasimou

2008-11-23
17:00

Atromitos	0 – 1	APOEL
	(report)	Mirosavljević 28'

Pafiako Stadium, Paphos
Attendance: 1,670
Referee: Panikos Andronikou

2008-11-29
19:00

APOEL	2 – 0	AEK
Broerse 5'; Kontis 14'	(report)	Veiga (red card) 64'

GSP Stadium, Nicosia
Attendance: 5,552
Referee: Leontios Trattos

2008-12-04
20:00

APOEL	1 – 0	Anorthosis
Mirosavljević 63'	(report)

GSP Stadium, Nicosia
Attendance: 11,566
Referee: Leontios Trattos

2008-12-13
19:00

APEP	1 – 1	APOEL
Szili 29'	(report)	Mirosavljević 12'

Tsirion Stadium, Limassol
Attendance: 1,745
Referee: Marios Tsangaris

2008-12-21
17:00

Doxa	0 – 2	APOEL
	(report)	Alexandrou 57'; Mirosavljević 73' (pen.)

Makario Stadium, Nicosia
Attendance: 3,578
Referee: Stelios Trifonos

2008-12-27
19:00

APOEL	3 – 0	Ethnikos Achnas
Mirosavljević 63', 72'; Alexandrou 85'	(report)

GSP Stadium, Nicosia
Attendance: 4,828
Referee: Costas Kapitanis

2009-01-04
18:00

AEL	0 – 1	APOEL
Torrão (red card) 72'	(report)	Mirosavljević 83'

Tsirion Stadium, Limassol
Attendance: 7,332
Referee: Leontios Trattos

2009-01-11
18:00

APOEL	4 – 1	AE Paphos
Michael 29' (pen.); Alexandrou 42'; Paulo Costa 44' (pen.), 73'	(report)	Ba 57'

GSP Stadium, Nicosia
Attendance: 5,417
Referee: Antonis Christodoulou

2009-01-17
19:00

Omonia	0 – 1	APOEL
Ndikumana (red card) 45'	(report)	Alexandrou 59'

GSP Stadium, Nicosia
Attendance: 19,570
Referee: Stelios Trifonos

2009-01-24
19:00

APOEL	1 – 0	APOP Kinyras
Seghiri 45'	(report)

GSP Stadium, Nicosia
Attendance: 3,799
Referee: Christos Nicolaidis

2009-01-31
17:30

EN Paralimni	0 – 1	APOEL
	(report)	Żewłakow 83'

Tasos Markou, Paralimni
Attendance: 1,800
Referee: Marios Tsaggaris

2009-02-07
19:00

APOEL	3 – 1	Alki
Onwuachi 29'; Żewłakow 79'; Satsias 88' (pen.)	(report)	Sajdak 84'

GSP Stadium, Nicosia
Attendance: 5,021
Referee: Christos Nicolaidis

2009-02-15
15:30

Apollon	0 – 1	APOEL
	(report)	Michael 13' (pen.)

Tsirion Stadium, Limassol
Attendance: 8,936
Referee: Leontios Trattos

2009-02-21
15:00

APOEL	4 – 0	Atromitos
Satsias 7'; Kosowski 20', 65'; Żewłakow 37'	(report)

GSP Stadium, Nicosia
Attendance: 3,800
Referee: Demetris Demetriou

2009-02-28
17:00

AEK	0 – 1	APOEL
	(report)	Onwuachi 74'

GSZ Stadium, Larnaca
Attendance: 5,000
Referee: Marios Tsaggaris

2009-03-08
16:00

Anorthosis	1 – 2	APOEL
Frousos 60'	(report)	Żewłakow 64'; Morais 77'

Antonis Papadopoulos, Larnaca
Attendance: 9,500
Referee: Leontios Trattos

2009-03-14
17:00

APOEL	4 – 0	APEP
Michael 33' (pen.); Żewłakow 45', 82', 86'	(report)

GSP Stadium, Nicosia
Attendance: 7,208
Referee: Stelios Trifonos

==== Playoffs ====
2009-03-22
16:00

AEL	0 – 1	APOEL
	(report)	Michael 93'

Tsirion Stadium, Limassol
Attendance: 5,690
Referee: (Israel) Liran Liani

2009-04-06
19:00

Omonia	1 – 2	APOEL
Alabi 9'	(report)	Kontis 69'; Pinto 84'

GSP Stadium, Nicosia
Attendance: 16,636
Referee: (Israel) Haim Yaacov

2009-04-11
19:00

APOEL	2 – 0	Anorthosis
Kosowski 14'; Michael 65'	(report)

GSP Stadium, Nicosia
Attendance: 9,836
Referee: Stelios Trifonos

2009-04-25
19:00

Anorthosis	1 – 1	APOEL
Skopelitis 19'	(report)	Żewłakow 39'

Antonis Papadopoulos, Larnaca
Attendance: 5,000
Referee: Christos Nicolaidis

2009-05-01
18:00

APOEL	3 – 1	AEL
Żewłakow 3' 17'; Broerse 37'	(report)	Júnior 5'

GSP Stadium, Nicosia
Attendance: 12,456
Referee: Marios Stamatis

2009-05-10
18:00

APOEL	abandoned (Note: Match abandoned (at 0–2) after 45 minutes due to conflicts between fans; match not counted in table but considered played.)	Omonia
	(report)	Konstantinou 2'; Žlogar 31'

GSP Stadium, Nicosia
Attendance: 6,250
Referee: Panikos Andronikou

=== UEFA Cup ===
==== First qualifying round ====
2008-07-17
18:00 CET

FK Pelister (North Macedonia)	0 – 0	(Cyprus) APOEL
	(Report 1) (Report 2)

Skopje City Stadium, Skopje
Attendance: 2,500
Referee: (Romania) Ovidiu Alin Hategan

2008-07-31
19:00 CET

APOEL (Cyprus)	1 – 0	(North Macedonia) FK Pelister
Michael 83' (pen.)	(Report 1) (Report 2)	Ristevski (red card) 77'

GSP Stadium, Nicosia
Attendance: 10,101
Referee: (Italy) Gianluca Rocchi

APOEL won 1–0 on aggregate.

==== Second qualifying round ====
2008-08-14
19:00 CET

APOEL (Cyprus)	2 – 2	(Serbia) Red Star Belgrade
Broerse 34'; Żewłakow 47'	(Report 1) (Report 2)	Edgar 9'; Burzanović 62'

GSP Stadium, Nicosia
Attendance: 10,188
Referee: (England) Robert Styles

2008-08-28
20:15 CET

Red Star Belgrade (Serbia)	3 – 3 (a.e.t.)	(Cyprus) APOEL
Subašić 77'; Milijaš 85', 103' (pen.)	(Report 1) (Report 2)	Kosowski 54'; Pinto 57'; Chiotis (red card) 101'; Mirosavljević 117'

Stadion Crvena Zvezda
Attendance: 20,125
Referee: (Spain) Julian Rodriguez Santiago

APOEL 5–5 Red Star Belgrade on aggregate. APOEL won on away goals.

==== First round ====
2008-09-16
18:00 CET

APOEL (Cyprus)	1 – 4	(Germany) Schalke 04
Mirosavljević 72'	(Report 1) (Report 2)	Westermann 25'; Rakitić 36'; Sánchez 41'; Altıntop 88'

GSP Stadium, Nicosia
Attendance: 7,112
Referee: (Poland) Robert Malek

2008-10-02
18:15 CET

Schalke 04 (Germany)	1 – 1	(Cyprus) APOEL
Pander 58'	(Report 1) (Report 2)	Pinto 6'

Veltins-Arena, Gelsenkirchen
Attendance: 52,214
Referee: (Portugal) Pedro Proença

FC Schalke won 5–2 on aggregate.

=== LTV Super Cup ===
2008-08-23
20:00 EET

Anorthosis	0 – 1	APOEL
	(report)	Kosowski 23'

GSP Stadium, Nicosia
Attendance: 4,585
Referee: Stelios Trifonos

APOEL won the 2008 Cypriot Super Cup (10th title).

=== Cypriot Cup ===
==== Second round ====
2009-01-21
16:00 EET

APOEL	2 – 2	Doxa Katokopia
Charalambides 41'; Onwuachi 74'	(report)	Stylianou 56'; Rodrigues 84'

GSP Stadium, Nicosia
Attendance: 2,032
Referee: Christos Elia

2009-02-04
16:00 EET

Doxa Katokopia	2 – 3	APOEL
Margaça 42'; Serjão 71'	(report)	Kosowski 1'; Onwuachi 8', 58'

Makario Stadium, Nicosia
Attendance: 2,738
Referee: Panikos Andronikou

APOEL won 5–4 on aggregate.

==== Quarterfinals ====
2009-03-04
16:00 EET

Ermis Aradippou	1 – 1	APOEL
Papathanasiou 32'	(report)	Kontis 73'

Ammochostos Stadium, Larnaca
Attendance: 900
Referee: Charalambos Skapoullis

2009-03-18
16:00 EET

APOEL	3 – 0	Ermis Aradippou
Mirosavljević 35'; Onwuachi 65'; Pinto 82'	(report)

GSP Stadium, Nicosia
Attendance: 2,410
Referee: Antonis Constantinides

APOEL won 4–1 on aggregate.

==== Semifinals ====
2009-04-15
19:00 EET

APOP Kinyras	2 – 0	APOEL
Buyse 30'; Vasconcelos 58'	(report)	Pinto (red card) 80'

Peyia Municipal Stadium, Peyia
Attendance: 3,100
Referee: Leontios Trattos

2009-05-06
19:30 EET

APOEL	1 – 0	APOP Kinyras
Alexandrou 16' (pen.)	(report)

GSP Stadium, Nicosia
Attendance: 9,848
Referee: Stelios Trifonos

APOP Kinyras won 2–1 on aggregate.
