= 2010–11 APOEL FC season =

APOEL
2010–11 season
- Chairman: Phivos Erotokritou
- Manager: Ivan Jovanović
- Stadium: GSP Stadium, Nicosia
- Cypriot First Division: 1st (champions)
- Cypriot Cup: Second round
- UEFA Europa League: Play-off round
- Top goalscorer: League: Esteban Solari (11); Ivan Tričkovski (11 each); All: Esteban Solari (15)
- Highest home attendance: 19,433 vs Getafe (26 August 2010)
- Lowest home attendance: 3,018 vs AEK Larnaca (7 May 2011)
- Average home league attendance: 10,070 (all competitions)
Home colours	Away colours	Third colours

The 2010–11 season was APOEL's 71st season in the Cypriot First Division and 83rd year in existence as a football club.

The first training session for the season took place on June 14, 2010 at GSP Stadium. On June 20, the team left Cyprus and moved to Obertraun in Austria to perform the main stage of their pre-season training and returned to Cyprus on July 4, 2010.

The team finished 2nd in the Cypriot championship the previous season and as such entered the UEFA Europa League 2010–11 second qualifying round. During the 2010–11 season APOEL reached the Europa League Play-off round being eliminated by Getafe CF 2–1 on aggregate, eliminated in the 2nd round of Cypriot Cup by Apollon 3–1 on aggregate, but finished the season with an emphatic way by winning the Championship four games before the end of the season, creating that day an advantage of 15 points from its main competitor and arch rivals Omonoia.

== Current squad ==
Last Update: January 6, 2011

Note: Flags indicate national team as defined under FIFA eligibility rules; some limited exceptions apply. Players may hold more than one non-FIFA nationality.

No.	Pos.	Nation	Player
3	DF	POR	Paulo Jorge
5	DF	MKD	Boban Grnčarov
6	MF	CYP	Demetris Kyriakou
7	DF	GRE	Savvas Poursaitidis
8	FW	POL	Adrian Sikora
9	FW	ARG	Esteban Solari
10	MF	CYP	Constantinos Charalambides
11	FW	MKD	Ivan Tričkovski
12	MF	CYP	Emilios Panayiotou
14	DF	NED	Joost Broerse
15	DF	CYP	Marios Antoniades
17	MF	CYP	Marinos Satsias (captain)
19	DF	CYP	Marios Elia
20	FW	CYP	Constantinos Ioannou
21	MF	BRA	Gustavo Manduca

No.	Pos.	Nation	Player
22	GK	GRE	Dionisis Chiotis
23	MF	POR	Hélio Pinto
24	DF	GRE	Christos Kontis
26	MF	POR	Nuno Morais
27	FW	BRA	Aílton José Almeida
29	MF	CYP	Nektarios Alexandrou
30	FW	SRB	Nenad Mirosavljević
33	MF	CYP	Chrysis Michael
60	GK	CYP	Kyriacos Ioannou
70	GK	CYP	Panos Constantinou
71	MF	CYP	Marios Theodorou
77	MF	CYP	Athos Solomou
81	MF	BRA	Marcinho
88	GK	CYP	Tasos Kissas
98	DF	BRA	William Boaventura

For recent transfers, see List of Cypriot football transfers summer 2010.
Also, see List of Cypriot football transfers winter 2010–11.

=== Squad changes ===
In:

No.	Pos.	Nat.	Name	Age	EU	Moving from	Type	Transfer window	Ends	Transfer fee	Source
6	DM	(Cyprus)	Kyriakou	23	EU	Olympiakos Nicosia	Loan Return →	Summer	2011	—	—
11	CF	(North Macedonia)	Tričkovski	23	Non-EU	Red Star Belgrade (Serbia)	Transfer ✓	Summer	2013	€300K	apoelfc.com.cy
21	LM	(Brazil)	Manduca	29	EU	AEK Athens (Greece)	Transfer ✓	Summer	2013	Free	apoelfc.com.cy
70	GK	(Cyprus)	Constantinou	24	EU	AEL Limassol	Transfer ✓	Summer	2011	Free	apoelfc.com.cy
9	CF	(Argentina)	Solari	30	EU	Almería (Spain)	Transfer ✓	Summer	2013	Free	apoelfc.com.cy
98	LB	(Brazil)	Boaventura	30	Non-EU	Metalurh Donetsk (Ukraine)	Transfer ✓	Summer	2012	Free	apoelfc.com.cy
27	CF	(Brazil)	Aílton	25	Non-EU	Copenhagen (Denmark)	Transfer ✓	Summer	2013	€700K	apoelfc.com.cy

Total expenditure: ▼€1M

Out:

No.	Pos.	Nat.	Name	Age	EU	Moving to	Type	Transfer window	Transfer fee	Source
20	SS	(Brazil)	Paulista	32	Non-EU	AEK Larnaca	End of contract ✗	Summer	Free	apoelfc.com.cy
9	CF	(Cyprus)	Papathanasiou	26	EU	Anorthosis Famagusta	End of contract ✗	Summer	Free	apoelfc.com.cy
11	LM	(Poland)	Kosowski	32	EU	Apollon Limassol	End of contract ✗	Summer	Free	apoelfc.com.cy
21	CF	(Poland)	Żewłakow	34	EU	GKS Bełchatów (Poland)	End of contract ✗	Summer	Free	apoelfc.com.cy
31	GK	(Cyprus)	Avgousti	33	EU	Apollon Limassol	End of contract ✗	Summer	Free	apoelfc.com.cy
32	LB	(Albania)	Haxhi	34	Non-EU	Apollon Kalamarias (Greece)	End of contract ✗	Summer	Free	apoelfc.com.cy
1	GK	(Cyprus)	Morfis	31	EU	PAEEK	End of contract ✗	Summer	Free	apoelfc.com.cy
37	RW	(Slovakia)	Breška	30	EU	Olympiacos Volos (Greece)	Mutual consent ✗	Summer	Free	apoelfc.com.cy
44	LB	(Greece)	Koutsopoulos	30	EU	AEL Limassol	Mutual consent ✗	Winter	Free	apoelfc.com.cy

Total income: ▲€0

Last updated: January 6, 2011

== Squad stats ==
				Total						Marfin Laiki League					Cypriot Cup					UEFA Europa League				
Country	N	P	Name	GS	A	Mins.	Gls.	Y	R	A	Mins.	Gls.	Y	R	A	Mins.	Gls.	Y	R	A	Mins.	Gls.	Y	R
(Portugal)	3	CB	Paulo Jorge	21	21	1862	3	7		15	1292	2	5		1	90		1		5	480	1	1	
(North Macedonia)	5	CB	Grnčarov	32	33	2968	6	5		26	2308	6	5		1	90				6	570			
(Cyprus)	6	DM	Kyriakou		1	5				1	5													
(Greece)	7	RB	Poursaitides	29	31	2450		3		27	2238		3		1	90				3	122			
(Poland)	8	CF	Sikora																					
(Argentina)	9	CF	Solari	21	36	2031	15	2		28	1416	11	1		2	118				6	497	4	1	
(Cyprus)	10	RM	Charalambides	26	37	2318	5	4		30	1717	3	2		2	135		1		5	466	2	1	
(North Macedonia)	11	CF	Tričkovski	22	33	2129	12	1		27	1930	11			1	90				5	109	1	1	
(Cyprus)	12	AM	Panayiotou																					
(Netherlands)	14	CB	Broerse	6	15	587		1	1	8	196				1	90				6	301		1	1
(Cyprus)	15	LB	Antoniades		1	3				1	3													
(Cyprus)	17	DM	Satsias	6	15	617		4		11	382		3		1	70		1		3	165			
(Cyprus)	19	RB	Elia	8	8	683		3		6	523		3		2	160								
(Cyprus)	20	CF	Ioannou																					
(Brazil)	21	LM	Manduca	33	35	2709	12	2		28	2182	10	2		2	124	1			5	403	1		
(Greece)	22	GK	Chiotis	35	35	3180		3		27	2430		1		2	180		1		6	570		1	
(Portugal)	23	AM	Pinto	33	34	2966	2	4		26	2289	1	3		2	180				6	497	1	1	
(Greece)	24	CB	Kontis	24	26	2173		3		23	1991		3		1	90				2	92			
(Portugal)	26	DM	Morais	35	35	3082		8		30	2679		7		2	180		1		3	223			
(Brazil)	27	CF	Aílton	28	36	2403	8	3		31	2173	7	3		2	62				3	168	1		
(Cyprus)	29	LM	Alexandrou	10	23	948	1	1		20	839	1	1		1	20				2	89			
(Serbia)	30	CF	Mirosavljević	1	10	196				10	196													
(Cyprus)	33	CM	Michael	2	7	273				5	251									2	22			
(Greece)	44	LB	Koutsopoulos																					
(Cyprus)	60	GK	Ioannou																					
(Cyprus)	70	GK	Constantinou	1	1	90				1	90													
(Cyprus)	71	RM	Theodorou																					
(Cyprus)	77	RM	Solomou	16	27	1592	1	2		19	921	1	2		2	101				6	570			
(Brazil)	81	AM	Marcinho	24	32	2105	7	4		25	1612	7	4		2	110				5	383			
(Cyprus)	88	GK	Kissas	4	4	360		2		4	360		2											
(Brazil)	98	LB	Boaventura	23	24	2026	3	5		18	1487	3	5							6	539			

Last updated: 2011-05-12
Source: Match reports in competitive matches, apoelfc.com.cy
Ordered by start team, game starts and position on pitch (from back right to front left)
0 shown as blank
Country: when 2 flags, 1st flag = country that plays for internationally, 2nd flag = country of birth; N = number on jersey; P = Position; Name = Name on jersey (for more extended name, pause the mouse pointer on the name); GS = Game Started; A = Appearances.

=== Top scorers ===
R	Player	Position	League	Cup	Europe	Total
1	(Argentina) Solari	CF	11	0	4	15
2	(North Macedonia) Tričkovski	LW	11	0	1	12
2	(Brazil) Manduca	LW	10	1	1	12
4	(Brazil) Aílton	CF	7	0	1	8
5	(Brazil) Marcinho	AM	7	0	0	7
6	(North Macedonia) Grnčarov	CB	6	0	0	6
7	(Cyprus) Charalambides	RW	3	0	2	5
8	(Brazil) Boaventura	LB	3	0	0	3
8	(Portugal) Paulo Jorge	CB	2	0	1	3
10	(Portugal) Pinto	DM	1	0	1	2
11	(Cyprus) Solomou	RW	1	0	0	1
11	(Cyprus) Alexandrou	LW	1	0	0	1
TOTAL			63	1	11	75

Last updated: May 14, 2011
Source: Match reports in Competitive matches

=== Captains ===
1. (Cyprus) Marinos Satsias
2. (Cyprus) Chrysis Michael
3. (Cyprus) Constantinos Charalambides
4. (Cyprus) Marios Elia
5. (Portugal) Hélio Pinto

== Club ==
=== Management ===
Position	Staff
Manager	(Serbia) (Greece) Ivan Jovanović
Assistant manager	(Cyprus) Yiannos Ioannou
First team coach/Scout	(Serbia) Predrag Erak
Goalkeeping coach	(Serbia) Jovan Mihajlovic
Fitness coach	(Cyprus) Giorgos Paraskeva
Team doctor	(Cyprus) Costas Schizas

Last updated: June 15, 2010
Source: apoelfc.com.cy

=== Kit ===
Supplier: Puma
Sponsor(s): MTN

Home	Away	Third

Source: apoelfc.com.cy

=== Other information ===
Chairman	(Cyprus) Phivos Erotokritou
Ground (capacity and dimensions)	GSP Stadium (22,859 / 105x68 m)

Source: apoelfc.com.cy

== Pre-season friendlies ==
2010-06-23
19:00 EET

Lokomotiv Moscow (Russia)	2–0	(Cyprus) APOEL
Glushakov 8', 20'	(Report)

Salzburg, Austria

2010-06-27
19:00 EET

Steaua București (Romania)	2–0	(Cyprus) APOEL
Tănase 47'; Surdu 72'	(Report)

Salzburg, Austria

2010-07-02
19:00 EET

APOEL (Cyprus)	1–2	(Czech Republic) Mladá Boleslav
Manduca 19'	(Report)	Táborský 64' (pen.); Bulut 72'

Obertraun, Austria

2010-07-08
19:30 EET

APOEL	2–0	AEL
Solari 52'; Tričkovski 62'	(Report)

GSP Stadium, Nicosia
Attendance: 5,000
Referee: Marios Tsaggaris

== Mid-season friendlies ==
2010-09-04
18:00 EET

APOEL	2–0	Iraklis Gerolakkou
Aílton,

"Archangelos" Athletic Centre, Nicosia

2010-12-30
11:00 EET

APOEL	1–1	Doxa
Grnčarov		Gomez

"Archangelos" Athletic Centre, Nicosia

== Competitions ==
=== Overall ===
Competition	Started round	Final position / round	First match	Last match
Marfin Laiki League	—	Winners	30 August 2010	11 May 2011
UEFA Europa League	2nd qualifying	Play-off	15 July 2010	26 August 2010
Cypriot Cup	2nd round	2nd round	12 January 2011	19 January 2011

Updated to match played June 5, 2011
Source: Competitions

=== Marfin Laiki League ===
==== Classification ====
Pos	Team	Pld	W	D	L	GF	GA	GD	Pts	Qualification or relegation
1	APOEL	26	20	2	4	55	19	+36	62	Qualification for second round, Group A
2	Omonia Nicosia	26	14	8	4	38	16	+22	50	Qualification for second round, Group A
3	Anorthosis Famagusta	26	13	6	7	46	31	+15	45	Qualification for second round, Group A
4	AEK Larnaca	26	12	6	8	36	30	+6	42	Qualification for second round, Group A
5	Apollon Limassol	26	11	5	10	40	37	+3	38	Qualification for second round, Group B

Source: UEFA
Rules for classification: 1) points; 2) head-to-head points; 3) head-to-head goal difference; 4) head-to-head goals scored; 5) goal difference; 6) number of goals scored.
Qualified teams for Group A will play for one spot for the second qualifying round of the UEFA Champions League and two spots for the UEFA Europa League second qualifying round.
A spot in the third qualifying round of UEFA Europa League will be awarded to the winners of the 2010–11 Cypriot Cup.
Qualified teams for Group C will play for one additional relegation spot.
Points gained in the First Round will be taken over into the Second Round groups.

==== Results summary ====
Overall								Home						Away					
Pld	W	D	L	GF	GA	GD	Pts	W	D	L	GF	GA	GD	W	D	L	GF	GA	GD
32	24	2	6	63	22	+41	74	14	0	2	37	10	+27	10	2	4	26	12	+14

Last updated: May 12, 2011.
Source: soccerway.com

==== Results by round ====
Round	1	2	3	4	5	6	7	8	9	10	11	12	13	14	15	16	17	18	19	20	21	22	23	24	25	26	27	28	29	30	31	32
Ground	H	A	H	A	H	A	H	A	H	A	H	H	A	A	H	A	H	A	H	A	H	A	H	A	A	H	A	H	A	H	H	A
Result	W	L	W	D	W	W	W	W	W	W	W	W	D	W	W	L	W	W	W	W	L	L	W	W	W	W	W	W	W	L	W	L
Position	7	9	4	5	2	2	1	1	1	1	1	1	1	1	1	1	1	1	1	1	1	1	1	1	1	1	1	1	1	1	1	1

Updated to match(es) played on May 12, 2011. Source: Soccerway
A = Away; H = Home; W = Win; D = Draw; L = Loss

=== Playoffs table ===
The first 12 teams are divided into 3 groups. Points are carried over from the first round.

==== Group A ====
Pos	Team	Pld	W	D	L	GF	GA	GD	Pts	Qualification
1	APOEL (C)	32	24	2	6	63	22	+41	74	Qualification for Champions League second qualifying round
2	Omonia Nicosia	32	18	9	5	45	19	+26	63	Qualification for Europa League third qualifying round (Note: Omonia qualified for the third qualifying round of the 2011–12 UEFA Europa League after winning the 2010–11 Cypriot Cup.)
3	Anorthosis Famagusta	32	16	7	9	51	34	+17	55	Qualification for Europa League second qualifying round
4	AEK Larnaca	32	12	6	14	37	42	−5	42	Qualification for Europa League second qualifying round

Rules for classification: 1) points; 2) head-to-head points; 3) head-to-head goal difference; 4) head-to-head goals scored; 5) goal difference; 6) number of goals scored.
(C) Champions

=== Matches ===
All times for the Domestic Competitions at EET

==== Regular season ====
2010-08-30
19:00

APOEL	1–0	Ermis
Charalambides 39'	(Report)

GSP Stadium, Nicosia
Attendance: Behind closed doors
Referee: Marios Panayi

2010-09-11
19:00

Paralimni	1–0	APOEL
Tarumbwa 47'	(Report)

Tasos Markou, Paralimni
Attendance: 3,147
Referee: Antonis Christodoulou

2010-09-19
18:00

APOEL	2–1	Anorthosis
Aílton 45+1'; Solomou 84'	(Report)	Okkas 39'

GSP Stadium, Nicosia
Attendance: 11,492
Referee: Stelios Trifonos

2010-09-25
19:00

AEP Paphos	1–1	APOEL
Purje 79'	(Report)	Tričkovski 29'

Pafiako Stadium, Paphos
Attendance: 2,984
Referee: Panikos Andronikou

2010-10-03
18:00

APOEL	3–0	Omonia
Boaventura 5'; Pinto 8'; Aílton 27'	(Report)

GSP Stadium, Nicosia
Attendance: 17,168
Referee: Marios Panayi

2010-10-17
18:00

Apollon	0–5	APOEL
	(Report)	Manduca 28' (pen.), 56'; Marcinho 63', 90'; Solari 83'

Tsirion Stadium, Limassol
Attendance: 7,131
Referee: Vasilis Demetriou

2010-10-23
18:00

APOEL	1–0	AEK
Tričkovski 76'	(Report)

GSP Stadium, Nicosia
Attendance: 10,826
Referee: Christos Nicolaides

2010-10-30
18:00

Ethnikos	0–1	APOEL
	(Report)	Tričkovski 26'

Dasaki Stadium, Achna
Attendance: 2,660
Referee: Marios Panayi

2010-11-07
16:00

APOEL	1–0	Alki
Manduca 24'	(Report)

GSP Stadium, Nicosia
Attendance: 8,216
Referee: Marios Tsangaris

2010-11-13
18:00

APOP Kinyras	0–5	APOEL
	(Report)	Aílton 8'; Tričkovski 38'; Grnčarov 59'; Alexandrou 77'; Solari 87'

Peyia Municipal Stadium, Peyia
Attendance: 2,300
Referee: Marios Stamatis

2010-11-21
18:00

APOEL	3–1	Doxa
Boaventura 39'; Manduca 59' (pen.); Tričkovski 83'	(Report)	Henrique 17'

GSP Stadium, Nicosia
Attendance: 8,396
Referee: Demetris Demetriou

2010-11-27
18:00

APOEL	4–1	Olympiakos
Solari 23', 30', 32'; Grnčarov 78'	(Report)	Ribeiro 47'

GSP Stadium, Nicosia
Attendance: 7,993
Referee: Marios Tsangaris

2010-12-04
18:00

AEL	2–2	APOEL
Freddy 71' (pen.); Zé Vítor 77'	(Report)	Tričkovski 16'; Grnčarov 90+2'

Tsirion Stadium, Limassol
Attendance: 7,916
Referee: Marios Panayi

2010-12-12
18:00

Ermis	0–2	APOEL
	(Report)	Solari 12', 36'

Ammochostos Stadium, Larnaca
Attendance: 2,888
Referee: Charalambos Skapoullis

2010-12-18
18:00

APOEL	2–1	Paralimni
Tričkovski 68'; Aílton 82'	(Report)	Krivokapić 50'

GSP Stadium, Nicosia
Attendance: 7,501
Referee: Marios Stamatis

2011-01-08
18:00

Anorthosis	2–0	APOEL
Laban 31'; Laborde 90+4'	(Report)

Antonis Papadopoulos, Larnaca
Attendance: 6,765
Referee: Savvas Zafiris

2011-01-15
18:00

APOEL	5–1	AEP Paphos
Manduca 4' (pen.); Marcinho 29', 40'; Solari 36'; Tričkovski 90+2'	(Report)	Ivanov 27'; Ndeki (yellow card) 87' (red card)

GSP Stadium, Nicosia
Attendance: 6,663
Referee: Charalambos Skapoullis

2011-01-22
18:00

Omonia	0–1	APOEL
Espasandín (yellow card) 72' (yellow-red card)	(Report)	Marcinho 60'

GSP Stadium, Nicosia
Attendance: 16,442
Referee: Christos Nicolaides

2011-01-30
18:00

APOEL	2–1	Apollon
Manduca 9'; Grnčarov 22'	(Report)	Bangura 14'

GSP Stadium, Nicosia
Attendance: 8,530
Referee: Marios Tsangaris

2011-02-05
18:00

AEK	1–2	APOEL
Pintado 20'; Dimech (yellow card) 57' (yellow-red card)	(Report)	Boaventura 25'; Aílton 67'

Neo GSZ Stadium, Larnaca
Attendance: 4,749
Referee: Christos Nicolaides

2011-02-14
19:00

APOEL	0–1	Ethnikos
	(Report)	Kássio 23'

GSP Stadium, Nicosia
Attendance: 6,091
Referee: Stelios Trifonos

2011-02-20
18:00

Alki	2–1	APOEL
Dobrasinović 2' (pen.); Semedo 90'	(Report)	Grnčarov 55'

Antonis Papadopoulos, Larnaca
Attendance: 2,273
Referee: Charalambos Skapoullis

2011-02-27
18:00

APOEL	6–2	APOP Kinyras
Aílton 18'; Marcinho 23'; Manduca 29', 32' (pen.), 70' (pen.); Grnčarov 90'	(Report)	Pavlou 41' (pen.); Ani 83'

GSP Stadium, Nicosia
Attendance: 7,314
Referee: Stelios Trifonos

2011-03-06
18:00

Doxa	0–1	APOEL
	(Report)	Aílton 81'

Makario Stadium, Nicosia
Attendance: 3,815
Referee: Thomas Mouskos

2011-03-12
18:00

Olympiakos	1–2	APOEL
João Paulo 79'	(Report)	Manduca 36'; Solari 85'

GSP Stadium, Nicosia
Attendance: 6,644
Referee: Marios Panayi

2011-03-19
15:30

APOEL	2–0	AEL
Paulo Jorge 59'; Solari 82'	(Report)

GSP Stadium, Nicosia
Attendance: 9,168
Referee: Stelios Trifonos

==== Playoffs ====
2011-04-03
17:00

AEK	0–1	APOEL
Hofland (yellow card) 70' (yellow-red card)	(Report)	Tričkovski 80'

Neo GSZ Stadium, Larnaca
Attendance: 4,424
Referee: Charalambos Skapoullis

2011-04-10
17:00

APOEL	2–0	Omonia
Charalambides 41', 45+3'	(Report)

GSP Stadium, Nicosia
Attendance: 12,816
Referee: Marios Tsangaris

2011-04-17
17:00

Anorthosis	1–2	APOEL
Okkas 25'	(Report)	Tričkovski 10', 34'

Antonis Papadopoulos, Larnaca
Attendance: 3,126
Referee: Demetris Chrysostomou

2011-04-30
19:00

APOEL	0–1	Anorthosis
	(Report)	Cafú 59'; Colin (yellow card) 71' (yellow-red card)

GSP Stadium, Nicosia
Attendance: 16,076
Referee: Stelios Trifonos

2011-05-07
17:00

APOEL	3–0	AEK
Paulo Jorge 26'; Solari 58'; Marcinho 87'	(Report)

GSP Stadium, Nicosia
Attendance: 3,018
Referee: Kostas Psefdiotis

2011-05-11
17:00

Omonia	1–0	APOEL
Aguiar 25'	(Report)

GSP Stadium, Nicosia
Attendance: 2,318
Referee: Leontios Trattos

=== UEFA Europa League ===
==== Qualifying phase ====
===== Second qualifying round =====
2010-07-15
17:00 CET

FK Tauras (Lithuania)	0–3	(Cyprus) APOEL
	(Report1) (Report2)	Charalambides 50'; Hélio Pinto 80'; Manduca 83'

S. Darius and S. Girėnas Stadium, Kaunas
Attendance: 500
Referee: (Denmark) Michael Svendsen

2010-07-22
19:00 CET

APOEL (Cyprus)	3–1	(Lithuania) FK Tauras
Solari 18', 86' (pen.); Tričkovski 80'	(Report1) (Report2)	Irkha 48'; Kuznecovs (red card) 84'

GSP Stadium, Nicosia
Attendance: 9,632
Referee: (Russia) Alexander Gvardis

APOEL won 6–1 on aggregate.

===== Third qualifying round =====
2010-07-29
19:00 CET

APOEL (Cyprus)	1–0	(Czech Republic) FK Jablonec
Solari 55'	(Report1) (Report2)

GSP Stadium, Nicosia
Attendance: 13,978
Referee: (Wales) Simon Lee Evans

2010-08-05
20:00 CET

FK Jablonec (Czech Republic)	1–3	(Cyprus) APOEL
Pavlík 33'	(Report1) (Report2)	Paulo Jorge 24'; Charalambides 28'; Solari 37'

Chance Arena, Jablonec nad Nisou
Attendance: 3,622
Referee: (Finland) Tony Asumaa

APOEL won 4–1 on aggregate.

===== Play-off round =====
2010-08-19
21:00 CET

Getafe CF (Spain)	1–0	(Cyprus) APOEL
Parejo 43'	(Report1) (Report2)

Coliseum Alfonso Pérez, Getafe
Attendance: 4,235
Referee: (Slovenia) Darko Ceferin

2010-08-26
19:00 CET

APOEL (Cyprus)	1–1 (a.e.t.)	(Spain) Getafe CF
Almeida 41'; Broerse (red card) 116'	(Report1) (Report2)	Díaz 98'

GSP Stadium, Nicosia
Attendance: 19,433
Referee: (Republic of Ireland) Alan Kelly

Getafe won 2–1 on aggregate.

=== Cypriot Cup ===
==== Second round ====
2011-01-12
18:00 EET

APOEL	1–1	Apollon
Manduca 55'	(Report)	Bangura 17'

GSP Stadium, Nicosia
Attendance: 7,022
Referee: Demetris Chrysostomou

2011-01-19
18:00 EET

Apollon	2–0	APOEL
Mrdaković 41' (pen.); Domínguez 90+1'	(Report)

Tsirion Stadium, Limassol
Attendance: 6,000
Referee: Vasilis Demetriou

Apollon won 3–1 on aggregate.
