= Benjamin Onwuachi =

Nigerian footballer

Personal information
- Date of birth: 9 April 1984 (age 42)
- Place of birth: Lagos, Nigeria
- Height: 1.71 m (5 ft 7 in)
- Position: Forward

Youth career
- 2000–2003: Reggiana
- 2003–2004: Juventus

Senior career*
Years	Team	Apps	(Gls)
2003–2005	Juventus	0	(0)
2004–2005	→ Salernitana (loan)	15	(4)
2005–2006	Standard Liège	0	(0)
2006–2009	Ionikos	68	(21)
2008–2009	→ APOEL (loan)	24	(8)
2009–2011	Kavala	55	(20)
2011–2012	AEL Limassol	10	(0)
2012	Panetolikos	9	(0)
2012–2013	Skoda Xanthi	21	(6)
2013–2014	Iraklis	23	(3)
2014	Oțelul Galați	1	(0)
2014	Salam Zgharta		
2016	Ionikos		
2016	Aiginiakos	6	(0)
2017	Banneux		
2017–2018	Nerostellati	18	(1)
Total		250	(63)
- * Club domestic league appearances and goals

Benjamin Onwuachi (born 9 April 1984) is a Nigerian retired footballer who played as a striker.

Onwuachi started his career in the youth ranks of Reggiana. He continued in the academies of Juventus where he didn't manage to establish himself in the first team. He then moved to Belgium to play for Standard Liège. After a brief spell in Belgium he moved to Greece in 2006, where he played for several clubs having also spells in Cyprus.

== Club career ==
In 2003, Onwuachi was purchased by Juventus from Reggiana for €420,000. He played in a 2003–04 Coppa Italia game against Siena and scored the winning goal for Juventus (2–1). In the 2004–05 season he went on loan to Salernitana where he played 15 games and scored 4 goals. In 2005 he signed a 2-year deal with Belgian side Standard Liège but failed to play a single match.

=== Ionikos ===
Midway through the 2005–06 season, he went to Greece and joined the team of Ionikos. In 2006–07 season Ionikos was relegated to the second division. In 2007–08 Beta Ethniki, he played in 27 games and had 14 goals, finishing as the third-highest scorer of the division. Unfortunately the club did not achieve promotion to the first division. In the match against PAS Giannina which Ionikos won 4–1, Onwuachi scored 2 goals.

=== APOEL ===
The next year the budget of Ionikos fell and in July 2008, Onwuachi went on loan to APOEL. He played in 20 games in the championship and scored 8 goals helping the team to win the Cypriot First Division and the Super Cup. In May 2009, the player and the chairman of APOEL, Phivos Erotokritou, did not agree on signing a new contract and Onwuachi returned to Greece.

=== Kavala ===
On 20 August 2009, he signed a 4-year contract with the newly promoted Super League Greece club, Kavala. His first season with his new team, was excellent because he became 4th in top scorers of Super League Greece, scoring 10 goals. In August 2011, FIFA canceled his contract with the club after they failed to pay his salary for two consecutive months.

=== AEL Limassol ===
On 25 August 2011, he signed with AEL Limassol in Cyprus, but he was released from the club in January 2012.

=== Panetolikos ===
On 26 January 2012, he returned to Greece and signed a 6-month contract with Panetolikos. On 26 April 2012, after the conclusion of the season, Onwuachi and Panetolikos parted their ways, as he could not fit into the team.

=== Skoda Xanthi ===
On 6 June 2012, Onwuachi signed a contract with Xanthi.

=== Iraklis ===
On 19 July 2013, Onwuachi signed a contract with Iraklis. He made his league debut for Iraklis on 30 September 2013 in an away loss against Kavala. He scored his first goal for the club on 13 January 2013, in an away win against Ethnikos Gazoros.

== Career statistics ==
Appearances and goals by club, season and competition
Club	Season	League			Cup		Continental		Other		Total	
Club	Season	Division	Apps	Goals	Apps	Goals	Apps	Goals	Apps	Goals	Apps	Goals
Juventus	2003–04	Serie A	0	0	1	1	0	0	0	0	1	1
Salernitana (loan)	2004–05	Serie B	15	4	3	2	—		—		18	6
Ionikos	2005–06	Alpha Ethniki	13	3	0	0	—		—		13	3
Ionikos	2006–07	Alpha Ethniki	28	4	2	0	—		—		30	4
Ionikos	2007–08	Beta Ethniki	27	14	0	0	—		—		27	14
Ionikos	Total		68	21	2	0	—		—		70	21
APOEL (loan)	2008–09	Cypriot First Division	24	8	6	4	3	0	1	0	34	12
Kavala	2009–10	Super League Greece	28	10	6	4	—		—		34	14
Kavala	2010–11	Super League Greece	27	10	1	0	—		—		28	10
Kavala	Total		55	20	7	4	—		—		62	24
AEL Limassol	2011–12	Cypriot First Division	10	0	0	0	—		—		10	0
Panetolikos	2011–12	Super League Greece	9	0	0	0	—		—		9	0
Skoda Xanthi	2012–13	Super League Greece	21	6	2	1	—		—		23	7
Iraklis	2013–14	Football League	23	3	5	0	—		—		28	3
Oțelul Galați	2014–15	Liga I	1	0	0	0	—		1	0	2	0
Aiginiakos	2016–17	Football League	6	0	1	0	—		—		7	0
Nerostellati	2017–18	Serie D	18	1	—		—		—		18	1
Career total			250	63	27	12	3	0	2	0	282	75

== Honours ==
APOEL

- Cypriot First Division: 2008–09
- Cypriot Super Cup: 2008
