= Ivan Trichkovski =

Macedonian footballer

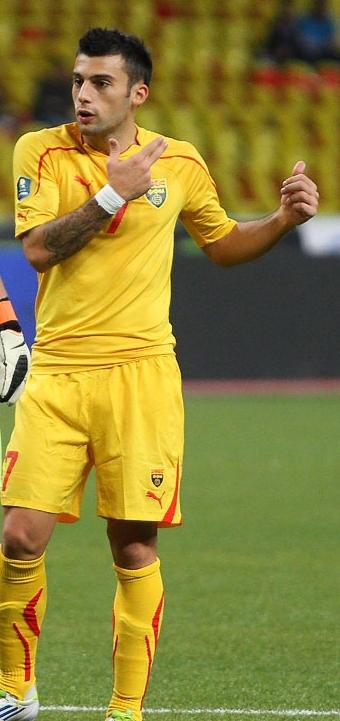
- Trichkovski with Macedonia in 2011

Personal information
- Date of birth: 18 April 1987 (age 39)
- Place of birth: Skopje, SR Macedonia, Yugoslavia
- Height: 1.82 m (6 ft 0 in)
- Positions: Winger; striker

Team information
- Current team: AEL Limassol (football director)

Youth career
- Vardar

Senior career*
Years	Team	Apps	(Gls)
2004–2006	Vardar	32	(6)
2006–2007	Rabotnički	26	(14)
2007–2010	Red Star Belgrade	25	(3)
2009–2010	→ Enosis Neon Paralimni (loan)	29	(8)
2010–2012	APOEL	51	(17)
2012–2014	Club Brugge	19	(1)
2013–2014	→ Beveren (loan)	33	(5)
2014–2015	Al-Nasr	12	(3)
2015–2016	Legia Warsaw	11	(1)
2016–2024	AEK Larnaca	221	(115)
2024–2025	AEL Limassol	17	(7)
Total		444	(174)

International career
2003	Macedonia U17	3	(2)
	Macedonia U19	6	(3)
	Macedonia U21	9	(1)
2010–2021	North Macedonia	67	(7)
- * Club domestic league appearances and goals as of 09:38, 12 May 2025 (UTC)

Ivan Trichkovski (Macedonian: Иван Тричковски; born 18 April 1987) is a former Macedonian professional footballer who played as a winger or striker. He is currently the general football director of AEL Limassol.

== Club career ==
=== Red Star Belgrade ===
Trichkovski joined Red Star Belgrade in January 2008 for a fee of around €800,000 from FK Rabotnički. He actually faced his future team (APOEL) in the 2008–09 UEFA Cup while playing for Red Star, and ended up on the losing side in a dramatic 3–3 draw in Belgrade which saw APOEL progress on away goals with a late equalizer in the 116th minute.

=== APOEL ===
Trichkovski spent the 2009–10 season on loan at Enosis Neon Paralimni where he scored 8 goals in 29 appearances and caught the eye of a successful club in Cyprus, APOEL, who agreed in principle to a three-year deal with Trickovski in May 2010. It is believed that the transfer fee which was paid to Red Star Belgrade was in the region of €300,000. In December 2010, the Belgian club Lokeren made an official offer of €1.2 million for Trickovski but APOEL rejected it. Trichkovski became a champion in his first season in APOEL, by helping the club to win the 2010–11 Cypriot First Division. The next season, he appeared in all but one APOEL's 2011–12 UEFA Champions League matches (from group stages to quarter-finals) and he scored one goal against Shakhtar Donetsk in Donbas Arena on 28 September 2011, by opening the score on 61st minute, in a group stage match which ended with 1–1 draw. He also appeared in the round-of-16 triumph over Olympique Lyonnais where he converted his attempt in the penalty shootout.

=== Club Brugge ===
In June 2012, Trichkovski moved to Belgian side Club Brugge for an undisclosed fee, reportedly in the region of €1.2 million. On 20 July 2013, he completed a move to Waasland-Beveren, on a season-long loan deal from Club Brugge.

=== AEK Larnaca ===
In 2016, Trichkovski joined Cypriot First Division club AEK Larnaca. On 1 August 2019, he scored a career-high four goals in a 4–0 away win over Bulgarian club Levski Sofia in a second qualifying round UEFA Europa League match.

=== AEL Limassol ===
On 4 July 2024, Trichkovski was announced at AEL Limassol.

Ivan scored his first goal in the opening game of the season against Omonia 29M in a 4–2 win for AEL Limassol away at Peristerona.

On 13 May 2025, it was announced that Trichkovski has retired from professional football and will take the role of general football director at AEL Limassol until 2027.

== International career ==
For the Macedonia U17 national team, Trichkovski scored against Italy on 21 September 2003, a 2004 UEFA European Under-17 Football Championship qualifier, and Luxembourg on 25 September 2003.

Trichkovski also played for the Macedonia U19 side. He scored a goal against Azerbaijan on 28 September 2004, a U-19 Euro Championship qualifying match., Armenia on 30 September 2004., France on 2 October 2004. He also played for his country in the 2006 UEFA European Under-19 Football Championship qualifiers.

Trichkovski was a member of the Macedonia U21 before he was called up in February 2008 for the senior squad to face Serbia in a friendly, but he was forced to withdraw due to injury. He scored on his debut with the national team on 29 May 2010 against Azerbaijan with a volley, as Macedonia went on to win 3–1. He scored his second goal for Macedonia on 11 August 2010 against Malta. As of May 2020, he has earned a total of 56 caps, scoring 5 goals.

== Career statistics ==
=== Club ===
As of match played 12 May 2025

Appearances and goals by club, season and competition
Club	Season	League			National cup (Note: Includes Cypriot Cup, Belgian Cup)		Continental		Other		Total	
Club	Season	Division	Apps	Goals	Apps	Goals	Apps	Goals	Apps	Goals	Apps	Goals
Rabotnički	2006-07	First Football League	10	5	—		—		—		10	5
Rabotnički	2007–08	First Football League	16	9	—		6	0	—		22	9
Rabotnički	Total		26	14	0	0	6	0	0	0	32	14
Red Star Belgrade	2007–08	Serbian SuperLiga	11	0	0	0	—		—		11	0
Red Star Belgrade	2008–09	Serbian SuperLiga	14	3	0	0	2	0	—		16	3
Red Star Belgrade	Total		25	3	0	0	2	0	0	0	27	3
Enosis Neon Paralimni (loan)	2009–10	Cypriot First Division	29	8	0	0	—		—		29	8
APOEL	2010–11	Cypriot First Division	27	11	0	0	5 (Note: Appearances in UEFA Europa League)	1	0	0	32	12
APOEL	2011–12	Cypriot First Division	24	6	2	0	13 (Note: Appearances in UEFA Champions League)	1	1 (Note: Appearance in Cypriot Super Cup)	0	40	7
APOEL	Total		51	17	2	0	18	2	1	0	72	19
Club Brugge	2012–13	Belgian Pro League	19	1	1	0	3	1	—		23	2
Beveren (loan)	2013–14	Belgian Pro League	33	5	2	1	—		—		35	6
Al-Nasr	2014–15	UAE Pro-League	12	3	0	0	—		7	3	19	6
Legia Warsaw	2015–16	Ekstraklasa	11	1	0	0	6	0	—		17	1
AEK Larnaca	2015–16	Cypriot First Division	14	7	4	1	—		—		18	8
AEK Larnaca	2016–17	Cypriot First Division	26	14	4	4	8	6	—		38	24
AEK Larnaca	2017–18	Cypriot First Division	28	11	6	4	7	1	—		41	16
AEK Larnaca	2018–19	Cypriot First Division	23	15	3	1	12	8	1	0	39	24
AEK Larnaca	2019–20	Cypriot First Division	19	20	2	0	6	5	—		27	25
AEK Larnaca	2020–21	Cypriot First Division	30	16	1	0	—		—		31	16
AEK Larnaca	2021–22	Cypriot First Division	31	15	2	1	—		—		33	16
AEK Larnaca	2022–23	Cypriot First Division	29	11	1	0	10 (Note: Two appearances in UEFA Champions League, eight appearances and one goal in UEFA Europa League)	1	—		40	12
AEK Larnaca	2023–24	Cypriot First Division	21	6	3	1	4	0	—		28	7
AEK Larnaca	Total		221	115	26	12	47	21	1	0	295	148
AEL Limassol	2024–25	Cypriot First Division	17	7	1	0	0	0	—		18	7
Career total			444	174	31	13	80	24	9	3	566	214

=== International ===
Scores and results list Macedonia's goal tally first, score column indicates score after each Trichkovski goal.

List of international goals scored by Ivan Trichkovski
No.	Date	Venue	Opponent	Score	Result	Competition
1	29 May 2010	Sportplatz Bischofshofen, Bischofshofen, Austria	Azerbaijan	1–0	3–1	Friendly
2	11 August 2010	Ta' Qali National Stadium, Ta' Qali, Malta	Malta	1–0	1–1	Friendly
3	26 March 2011	Dublin Arena, Dublin, Ireland	Republic of Ireland	1–2	1–2	UEFA Euro 2012 qualification
4	6 September 2013	Philip II Arena, Skopje, Macedonia	Wales	1–0	2–1	2014 FIFA World Cup qualification
5	6 September 2018	Victoria Stadium, Gibraltar	Gibraltar	1–0	2–0	2018–19 UEFA Nations League D
6	15 November 2020	Toše Proeski Arena, Skopje, North Macedonia	Estonia	1–0	2–1	2020–21 UEFA Nations League C
7	4 June 2021	Toše Proeski Arena, Skopje, North Macedonia	Kazakhstan	2–0	4–0	Friendly

== Honours ==
APOEL

- Cypriot First Division: 2010–11
- Cypriot Super Cup: 2011

Al-Nasr

- UAE President's Cup: 2014–15
- UAE Arabian Gulf Cup: 2014–15

Legia Warsaw

- Ekstraklasa: 2015–16

AEK Larnaca

- Cypriot Cup: 2017–18
- Cypriot Super Cup: 2018

Individual

- Cypriot First Division top scorer: 2019–20, 2021–22
