= Tomasz Sajdak =

Polish-German footballer (born 1984)

Personal information
- Full name: Tomasz Piotr Sajdak
- Date of birth: 11 October 1984 (age 42)
- Place of birth: Szczecinek, Poland
- Height: 1.92 m (6 ft 4 in)
- Positions: Striker; midfielder

Youth career
- UKS 7 Szczecinek
- Darzbór Szczecinek
- 2000: UKS SMS Łódź
- 2001–2003: Werder Bremen
- 2003–2004: Hannover 96

Senior career*
Years	Team	Apps	(Gls)
2003–2004	Kickers Emden	10	(0)
2005	SC Weyhe	22	(25)
2005	Wisła Płock	5	(0)
2006	Radomiak Radom	7	(1)
2007	GÍ Gøta	20	(1)
2008	Liepājas Metalurgs	0	(0)
2008	HJK	11	(5)
2009	Alki Larnaca	8	(1)
2009	Slavia Sofia	2	(0)
2010	Aluminium Hormozgan		
2011	IFK Mariehamn		
2012	BFC Dynamo	4	(0)
2012	Aarhus Fremad		
2013	Jeunesse Canach	1	(0)
- * Club domestic league appearances and goals

Tomasz Piotr Sajdak (born 11 October 1984) is a Polish former professional footballer who played as a striker and midfielder. He also holds German citizenship. He played in eleven countries. In Poland, Germany, Faroe Islands, Latvia, Finland, Cyprus, Bulgaria, Iran, Åland, Denmark and Luxembourg.

== Career ==
=== Poland ===
Sajdak started the 2005–06 season playing for Wisła Płock, before moving to second division club Radomiak Radom in early 2006.

=== HJK ===
Sajdak joined Veikkausliiga side HJK on 16 April 2008 on a Bosman transfer. He made his debut on 28 April 2008 against IFK Mariehamn and scored his first goal for the club. His first hat-trick for HJK came on 19 May 2008 against Tampere United in a 5–1 home victory. He won the Finnish Cup in 2008.

=== Slavia Sofia ===
On 1 September 2009, Sajdak signed a contract with Bulgarian side Slavia Sofia.

== Honours ==
HJK Helsinki

- Finnish Cup: 2008
