= Bark Seghiri =

French footballer (born 1978)

Personal information
- Full name: Bark Seghiri
- Date of birth: August 8, 1978 (age 48)
- Place of birth: Argenteuil, France
- Height: 1.80 m (5 ft 11 in)
- Position: Defender

Youth career
- 1997–1998: RC Paris
- 1998–2000: Paris Saint Germain

Senior career*
Years	Team	Apps	(Gls)
2000–2003	FC Istres	85	(3)
2003–2004	ES Wasquehal	30	(3)
2004–2006	Iraklis	44	(2)
2006–2009	APOEL	51	(1)
2009–2010	Panserraikos	7	(0)

International career
- France U18
- * Club domestic league appearances and goals as of 5 January 2012

Bark Seghiri (born August 8, 1978) is a French former football player who last played as a defender for Panserraikos in the Greek Football League.

== Career ==
He started his career at FC Istres in France. He had also played for ES Wasquehal, Iraklis in Greece and APOEL in Cyprus. During his spell with APOEL, he won two Championships, one Cup and one Super Cup.

== International career ==
Seghiri represented France at the Under-18 level. However, being Algerian by descent, he was pre-selected four times by the Algerian National Team but never received a full call-up.

== Honours ==
APOEL

- Cypriot League: 2006-07, 2008-09
- Cypriot Cup: 2008
- Cypriot Super Cup: 2008
