= Paraskevas Christou =

Cypriot footballer (born 1984)

Personal information
- Date of birth: February 2, 1984 (age 42)
- Place of birth: Larnaca, Cyprus
- Height: 1.85 m (6 ft 1 in)
- Position: Defender

Youth career
- AEK Larnaca

Senior career*
Years	Team	Apps	(Gls)
2000–2008	AEK Larnaca	111	(7)
2008–2009	APOEL	10	(2)
2009–2010	AC Omonia	5	(0)
2010–2012	Alki Larnaca	24	(0)
2012–2013	Universitatea Cluj	17	(0)
2013–2015	Pandurii Târgu Jiu	32	(2)

International career^{‡}
1999–2000	Cyprus U-17	7	(0)
2001–2003	Cyprus U-19	5	(0)
2003–2005	Cyprus U-21	8	(0)
2007–2012	Cyprus	31	(0)
- * Club domestic league appearances and goals as of 4 June 2015 ‡ National team caps and goals as of 12 October 2012

Paraskevas Christou (Skevos) (born February 2, 1984) is a former Cypriot professional footballer who played as a central defender.

== Honours ==
AEK Larnaca

- Cypriot Cup: 2003–04

APOEL Nicosia

- Cypriot Championship: 2008–09
- Cypriot Super Cup: 2008

Omonia Nicosia

- Cypriot Championship: 2009–10
