= Savvas Poursaitidis =

Greek footballer (born 1976)

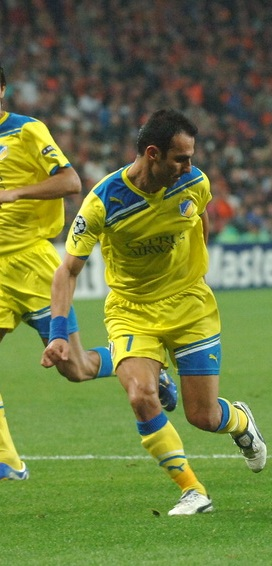

Personal information
- Date of birth: 23 June 1976 (age 50)
- Place of birth: Eleftheroupoli, Greece
- Height: 1.74 m (5 ft 9 in)
- Positions: Right back; right winger

Team information
- Current team: Nea Salamis Famagusta (manager)

Senior career*
| Years | Team | Apps | (Gls) |
| 1994–1996 | Doxa Drama | 67 | (6) |
| 1996–1998 | Veria | 39 | (10) |
| 1998–2000 | Olympiacos | 19 | (2) |
| 2000–2002 | Skoda Xanthi | 32 | (5) |
| 2002–2003 | Digenis Morphou | 11 | (2) |
| 2003–2004 | Ethnikos Achna | 19 | (10) |
| 2004–2008 | Anorthosis | 86 | (2) |
| 2008–2012 | APOEL | 97 | (1) |

International career
| 2010–2011 | Cyprus | 12 | (0) |

Managerial career
- 2016–2017: Anagennisi Deryneia
- 2017: Doxa Katokopias
- 2017–2020: Nea Salamis Famagusta
- 2021: APOEL
- 2022–2023: Nea Salamis Famagusta
- 2024: Volos
- 2025–: Nea Salamis Famagusta
- * Club domestic league appearances and goals

Savvas Poursaitidis (Greek: Σάββας Πουρσαϊτίδης, born 23 June 1976) is a former professional footballer and manager.

Poursaitidis played football, mainly as a right back, in his native Greece from 1994 to 2002 before moving to Cyprus where his playing career continued for a further ten years. In 2009 he received Cypriot citizenship and represented that country at international level. In 2016, he began his senior managerial career, also in Cyprus.

== Early life ==
Savvas Poursaitidis was born in Eleftheroupoli, in the Kavala district of Greece. He has a twin brother, Sakis, and his parents kept a taverna in Orfani.

== Club career ==
Poursaitidis started his senior career at Doxa Drama. He also played for Veria, Olympiacos and Skoda Xanthi in Greece. Later, he moved to Cyprus to play for Digenis Morphou, Ethnikos Achna, Anorthosis and APOEL.

=== APOEL ===
APOEL signed Poursaitidis in June 2008, after the player was released from Anorthosis as a result from a failure in negotiations with his former club to renew his contract. In his first year with APOEL he continued to impress Cypriot football fans with his high level performances. In the end, he helped APOEL to be crowned champions after one unsuccessful season.

The next season (2009–10) Poursaitidis helped APOEL to achieve the greatest success in its history and reach the UEFA Champions League group stage. He appeared in five group stage matches with APOEL.

After he won the championship again in 2010–11 with APOEL, the Board of Directors renewed his contract, as they recognized that Poursaitidis was one of the key players that contributed greatly towards winning the Championship.

In summer 2011, he appeared in nine 2011–12 UEFA Champions League matches for APOEL, in the club's surprising run to the quarter-finals of the competition.

In May 2012, Poursaitidis decided to retire from professional football, ending his four-year successful spell with the club.

== International career ==
In August 2009 he gained Cypriot nationality and made his debut with Cyprus national team in March 2010 in a friendly match against Iceland. He made 12 appearances with the national team.

== Scouting career ==
On 31 July 2012, after retiring from his football career, Poursaitides became Chief Scout in APOEL's newly created Scouting Department. On 7 June 2013, APOEL announced that the club were not renewing his contract.

== Managerial career ==
Poursaitidis started his managerial career on 23 October 2016, when he was appointed as the manager of the Cypriot First Division side Anagennisi Deryneia. On 25 January 2017, after only three months in charge, he left the team to take over as the manager of Doxa Katokopias. On 30 April 2017 he left the team. He later became the manager of Nea Salamis Famagusta. He was appointed manager of APOEL in January 2021. He was sacked in August 2021 after losing 4–0 against Pafos in the first match of the 2021-22 season.

== Honours ==
Olympiacos

- Super League Greece: 1998–99, 1999–2000
- Greek Cup: 1998–99

Anorthosis Famagusta

- Cypriot First Division: 2004–05, 2007–08
- Cypriot Cup: 2006–07
- Cypriot Super Cup: 2007

APOEL

- Cypriot First Division: 2008–09, 2010–11
- Cypriot Super Cup: 2008, 2009, 2011
