= Chrysis Michael =

Cypriot footballer

Personal information
- Full name: Chrysostomos Michael
- Date of birth: 26 May 1977 (age 49)
- Place of birth: Nicosia, Cyprus
- Height: 1.75 m (5 ft 9 in)
- Position: Defensive midfielder

Senior career*
Years	Team	Apps	(Gls)
1997–2003	AEL Limassol	139	(25)
2003–2011	APOEL	173	(33)
2011–2012	Enosis Neon Paralimni	20	(1)

International career^{‡}
2000–2011	Cyprus	69	(7)

Managerial career
- 2012–2014: Elpida Astromeriti
- 2014–2015: Achyronas Liopetriou
- 2015–2016: Olympiakos Nicosia
- 2016–2018: Olympiakos Nicosia
- 2019: Ermis Aradippou
- 2020: Karmiotissa Polemidion
- * Club domestic league appearances and goals as of 7 April 2019 ‡ National team caps and goals as of 23 May 2012

Chrysis Michael (Greek: Χρύσης Μιχαήλ) (born 26 May 1977 in Nicosia, Cyprus) is a Cypriot retired footballer.

== Club career ==
Chrysis Michael started his career from AEL Limassol in 1997 and stayed there until 2003, playing 139 league matches and scoring 25 goals.

In the summer of 2003 he signed with APOEL. He stayed with APOEL for 8 years (2003–2011), he became a captain, he played in 173 league matches and scored 33 goals. With APOEL he managed to win 4 Championships, 2 Cups and 3 Super Cups.

He was the man who drove APOEL towards the 2009–10 UEFA Champions League group stage for first time in their history by scoring two goals against F.C. Copenhagen in GSP Stadium for the second leg of the UEFA Champions League Play-offs. In that match, APOEL won 3-1 and overturned the 1-0 win of F.C Copenhagen in the first game. Chrysis Michael appeared in five official group stages matches of the 2009–10 UEFA Champions League with APOEL.

APOEL supporters and people in Cyprus believe that he is the best transfer of a Cypriot player in the modern history of APOEL .

In May 2011, it was announced that Chrysis Michael was released from the reigning champions APOEL, after serving the club for 8 years. The board of directors of APOEL have announced that for the football year 2011-2012 they are withdrawing the t-shirt with number 33 to honour, the club's ex captain. In an emotional moment Chrysis Michael was also honoured by APOEL ULTRAS in their fanclub where he stated "I am proud to be a part of APOEL's history".

In the summer of 2011, Chrysis signed with Enosis Neon Paralimni and at the end of 2011–12 season he decided to finish his football career.

== International career ==
Chrysis Michael was also an important member of the Cyprus national football team. He has made 69 appearances and scored 7 goals.

== Managerial career ==
He started his managerial career in December 2012 as the coach of Cypriot Fourth Division side Elpida Astromeriti. In summer 2014, he was appointed as the coach of Cypriot Fourth Division club Achyronas Liopetriou. From 1 September 2015 until 24 July 2016, and later from November 2016, he served as the manager of Cypriot Second Division side Olympiakos Nicosia.

== Honours ==
- APOEL
  - Cypriot First Division (4): 2003–04, 2006–07, 2008–09, 2010–11
  - Cypriot Cup (2): 2005-06, 2007–08
  - Cypriot Super Cup (3): 2004, 2008, 2009
