= Obertraun =

- Municipality
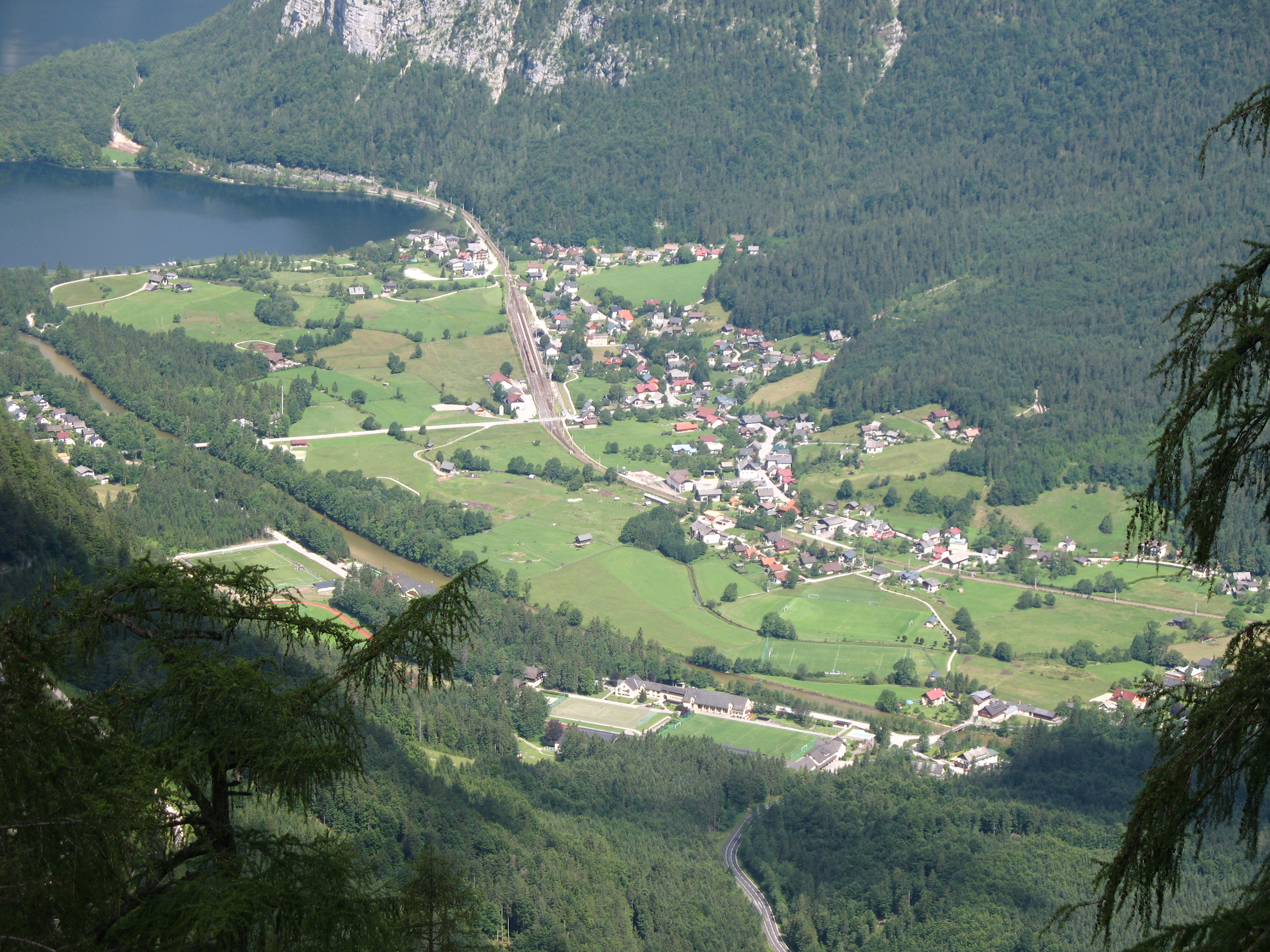

- Coat of arms

- Location within Austria
- Coordinates: 47°33′31″N 13°41′01″E
- Country: Austria
- State: Upper Austria
- District: Gmunden

Government
  - Mayor: Egon Höll (SPÖ)

Area
  - Total: 87.11 km^{2} (33.63 sq mi)
- Elevation: 511 m (1,677 ft)

Population (2018-01-01)
  - Total: 726
  - Density: 8.33/km^{2} (21.6/sq mi)
- Time zone: UTC+1 (CET)
  - Summer (DST): UTC+2 (CEST)
- Postal code: 4831
- Area code: +06 131
- Website: http://www.obertraun.ooe.gv.at

Obertraun, Upper Austria (Austrian German: [ˈoːbɐˌtʁaʊ̯n]) is a village in the Salzkammergut, a region in Austria, near the Hallstätter See (Hallstatt Lake) and Hoher Dachstein. It is a popular holiday destination with activities such as skiing and snowboarding in the winter, and mountain biking, swimming and kayaking in the summer.

== History ==
Originally a part of the Duchy of Bavaria, Obertraun became part of the Duchy of Austria during the 12th century. It was occupied several times during the Napoleonic Wars. It has been part of Upper Austria since 1918, and an autonomous town since 1921 (after being part of Hallstatt).

On 15 April 1954, a teacher and fourteen students got lost on a hiking trip on a nearby mountain and all froze to death.

== Climate ==
There is a weather station for the Dachstein Krippenstein ski area, situated at an elevation of 2,050 m (6,726 ft).

Climate data for Krippenstein: 2050m (1981−2010 normals, extremes 1971−2010)
Month	Jan	Feb	Mar	Apr	May	Jun	Jul	Aug	Sep	Oct	Nov	Dec	Year
Record high °C (°F)	13.5 (56.3)	12.2 (54.0)	17.4 (63.3)	14.4 (57.9)	21.4 (70.5)	24.1 (75.4)	26.0 (78.8)	25.3 (77.5)	24.0 (75.2)	19.8 (67.6)	14.5 (58.1)	15.2 (59.4)	26.0 (78.8)
Mean daily maximum °C (°F)	−2.0 (28.4)	−2.7 (27.1)	−0.5 (31.1)	2.3 (36.1)	7.4 (45.3)	10.3 (50.5)	13.0 (55.4)	12.9 (55.2)	9.6 (49.3)	7.1 (44.8)	1.3 (34.3)	−1.3 (29.7)	4.8 (40.6)
Daily mean °C (°F)	−5.4 (22.3)	−6.2 (20.8)	−4.1 (24.6)	−1.2 (29.8)	3.9 (39.0)	6.6 (43.9)	9.0 (48.2)	9.2 (48.6)	6.0 (42.8)	3.5 (38.3)	−2.0 (28.4)	−4.6 (23.7)	1.2 (34.2)
Mean daily minimum °C (°F)	−8.2 (17.2)	−8.9 (16.0)	−6.7 (19.9)	−3.7 (25.3)	1.3 (34.3)	3.9 (39.0)	6.2 (43.2)	6.5 (43.7)	3.4 (38.1)	0.9 (33.6)	−4.6 (23.7)	−7.2 (19.0)	−1.4 (29.4)
Record low °C (°F)	−28.5 (−19.3)	−24.0 (−11.2)	−25.2 (−13.4)	−17.0 (1.4)	−11.0 (12.2)	−6.4 (20.5)	−3.2 (26.2)	−7.0 (19.4)	−7.2 (19.0)	−15.0 (5.0)	−20.0 (−4.0)	−24.0 (−11.2)	−28.5 (−19.3)
Average precipitation mm (inches)	112.5 (4.43)	110.1 (4.33)	160.3 (6.31)	132.7 (5.22)	140.4 (5.53)	219.3 (8.63)	257.8 (10.15)	211.3 (8.32)	155.7 (6.13)	104.1 (4.10)	124.9 (4.92)	123.7 (4.87)	1,852.8 (72.94)
Average snowfall cm (inches)	124.5 (49.0)	142.8 (56.2)	224.1 (88.2)	109.2 (43.0)	41.1 (16.2)	16.6 (6.5)	3.1 (1.2)	6.9 (2.7)	23.9 (9.4)	39.3 (15.5)	101.7 (40.0)	138.6 (54.6)	971.8 (382.5)
Average precipitation days (≥ 1.0 mm)	12.0	12.1	14.5	13.1	13.3	18.1	17.5	15.4	12.8	10.4	12.6	12.9	164.7
Average snowy days (≥ 1 cm)	31.0	28.3	31.0	30.0	28.0	12.4	2.5	1.5	5.9	11.9	24.8	30.7	238
Source: Central Institute for Meteorology and Geodynamics

== Tourism ==
In 1895 an "association for beautification of the town and advancement of tourism" was founded, and was the starting point for tourism at Obertraun. The first tourists arrived in the town that summer. In 1947 construction of the Dachstein Cablecar began.

== Places of interest ==
- Freesports Arena Krippenstein: known as freeride area with more than 30 km offpiste routes. Many possible snowshoe trails.
- Dachstein Caves: including an ice cave and a gigantic limestone cave which can be visited during summer.
- Nature protection area Koppenwinkel

== Gallery ==
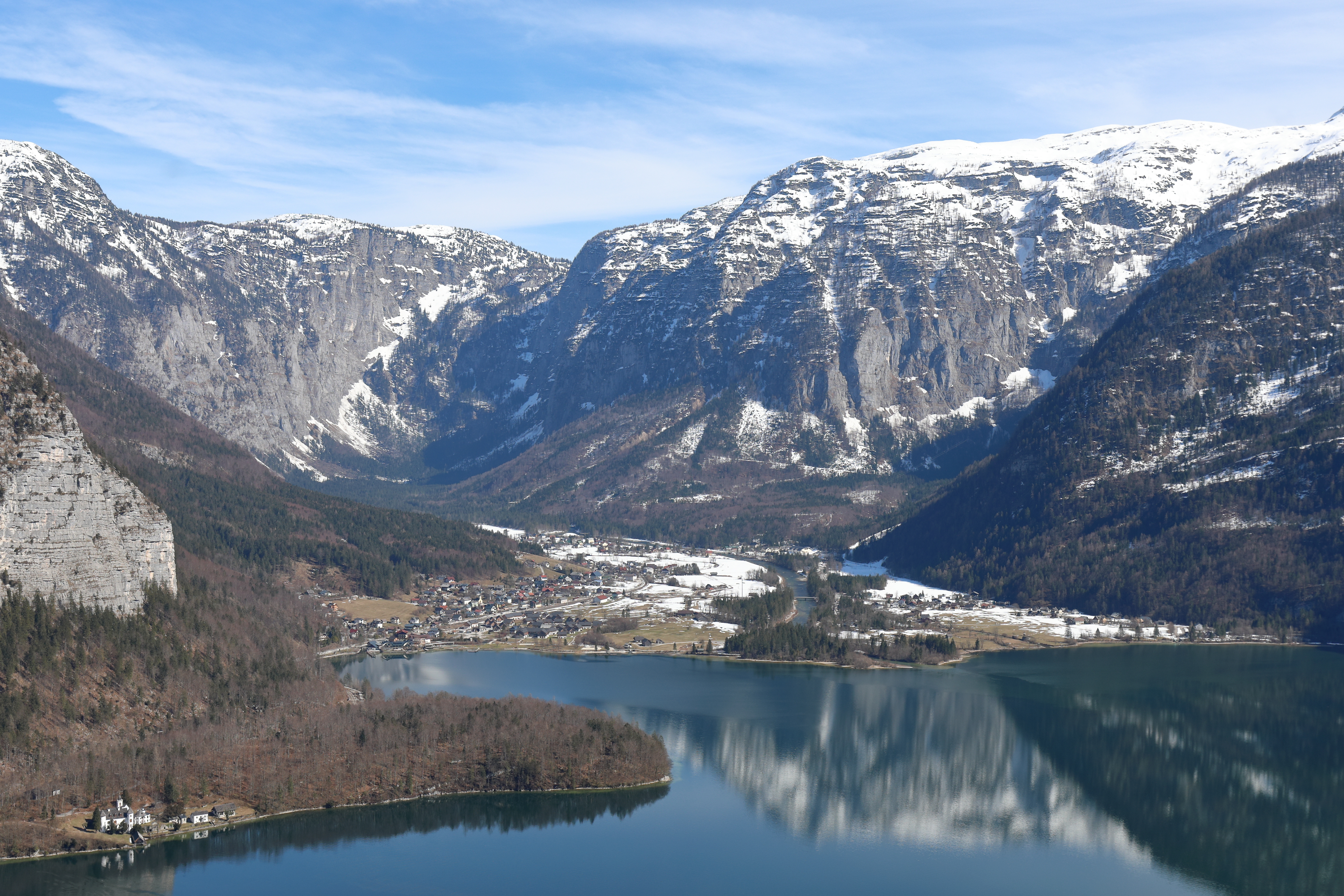
West view of Obertraun

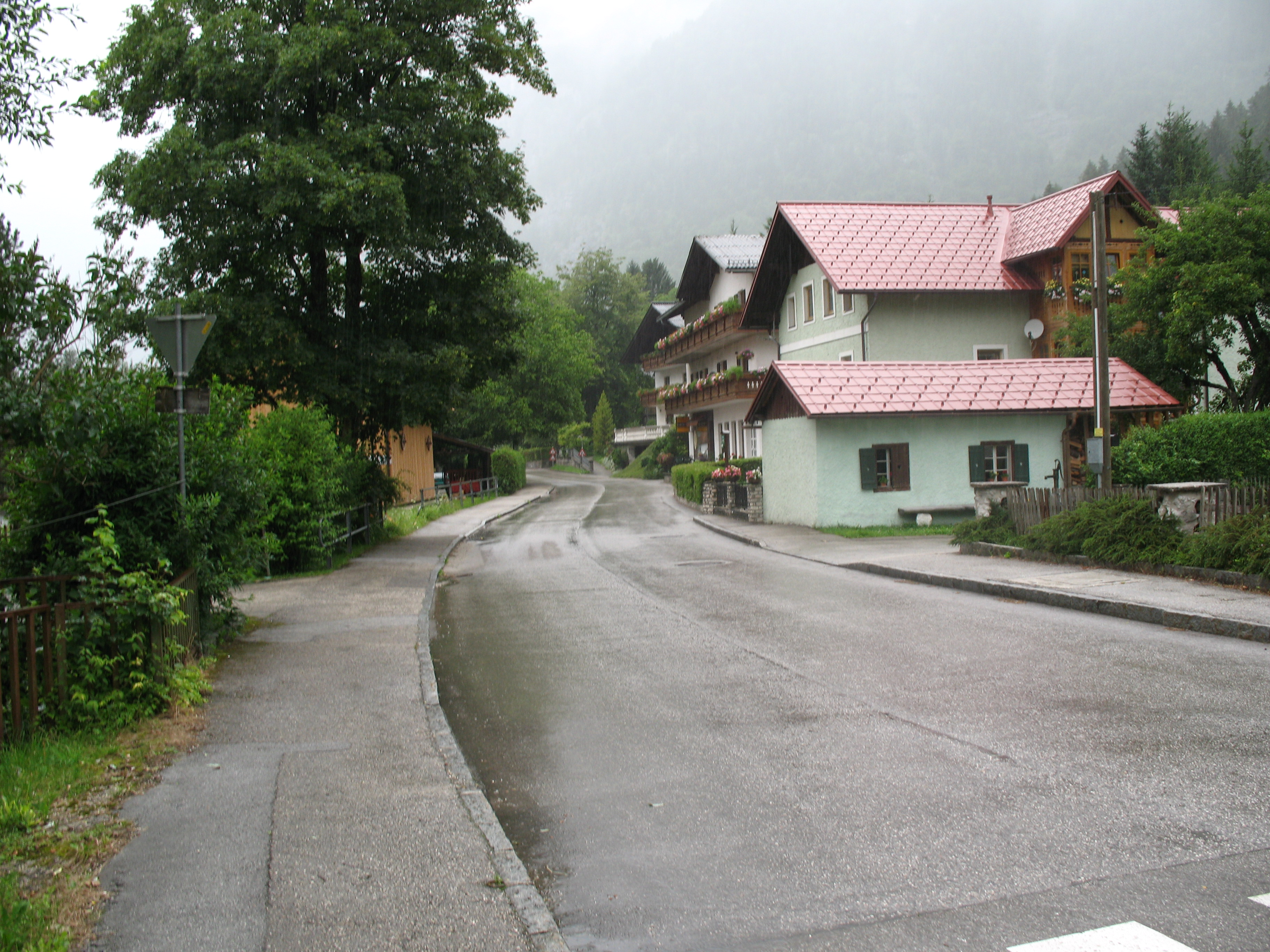
Hallstätterseestrasse

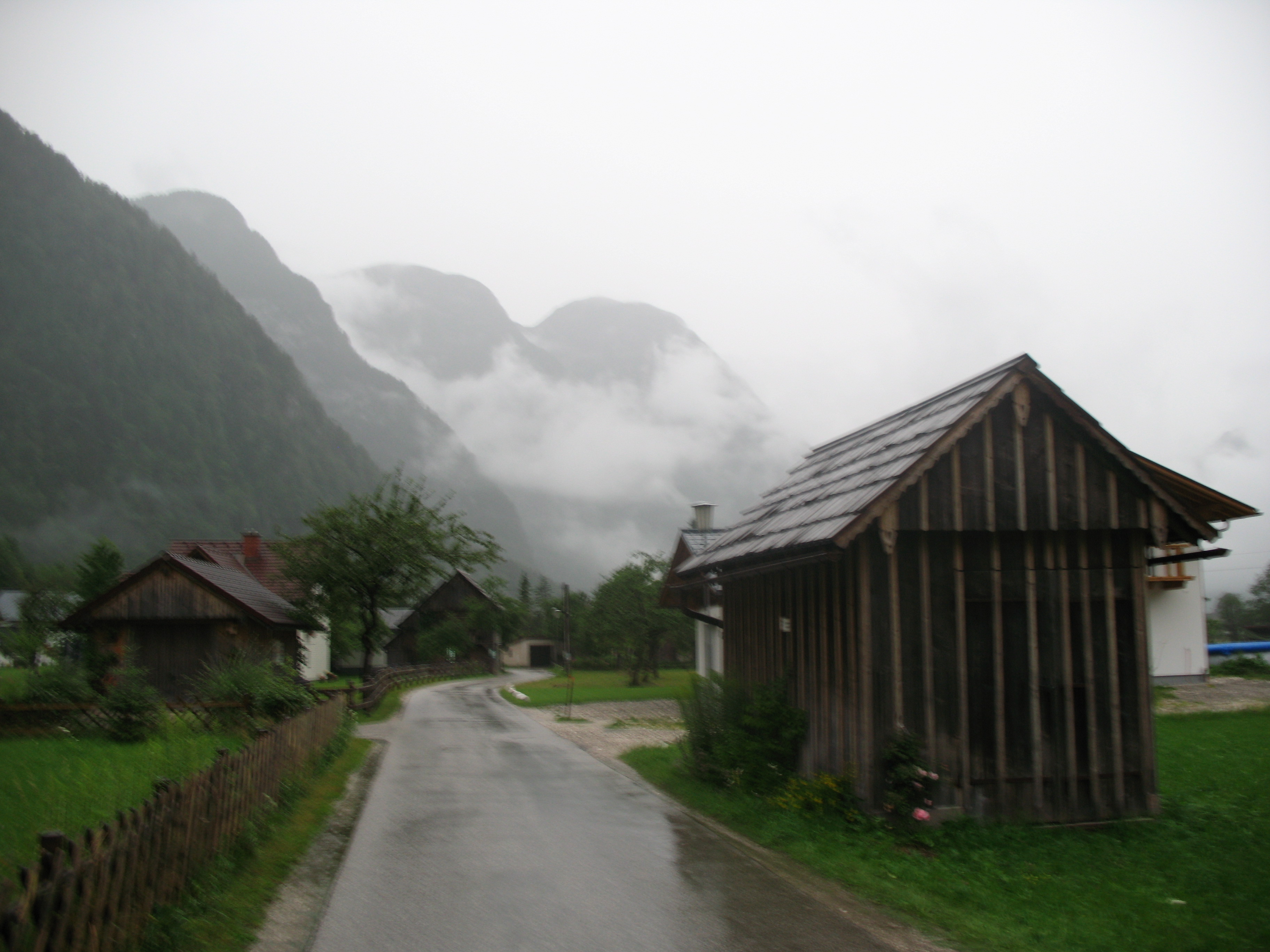
Obertraun

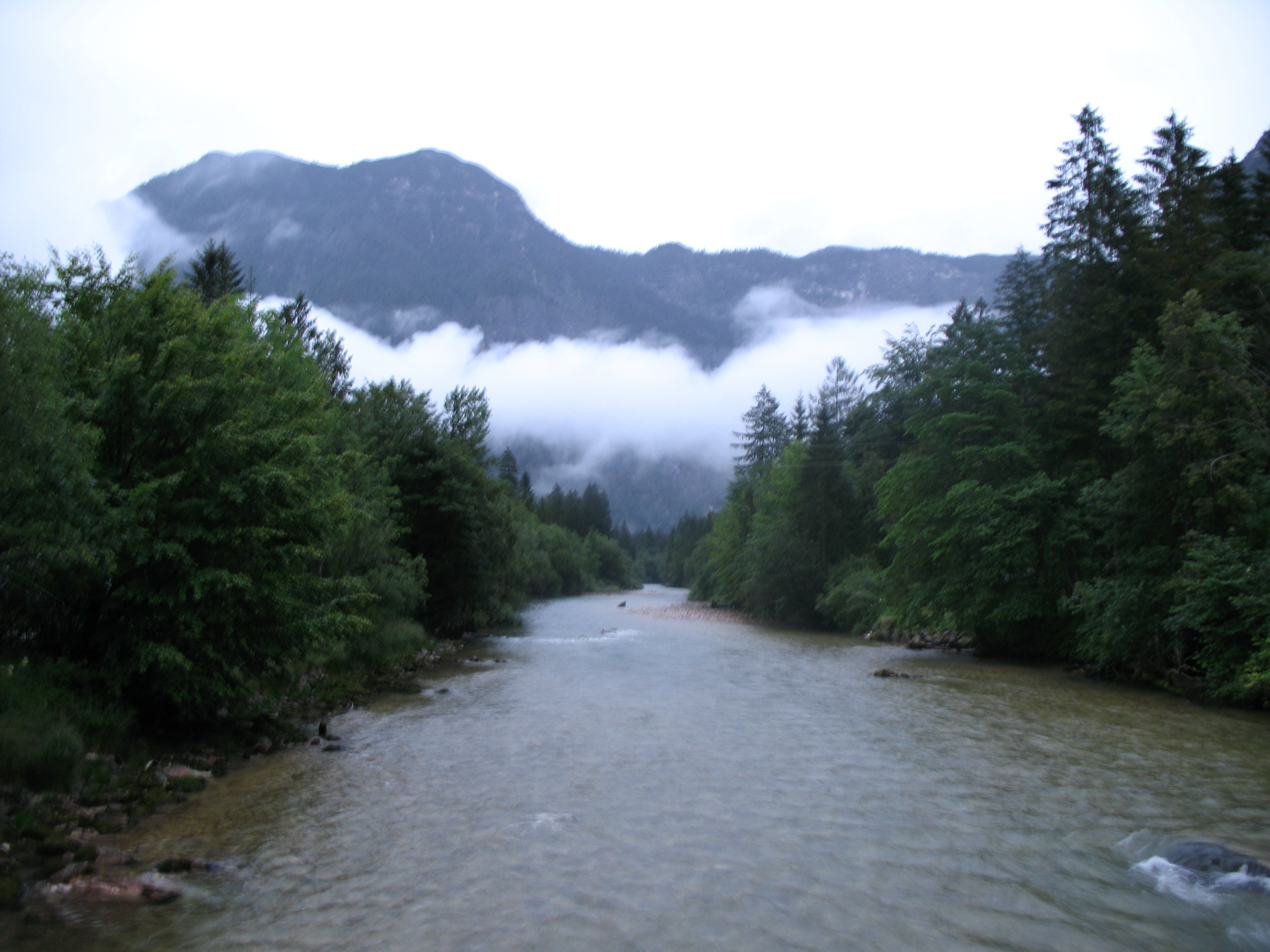
Obertraun

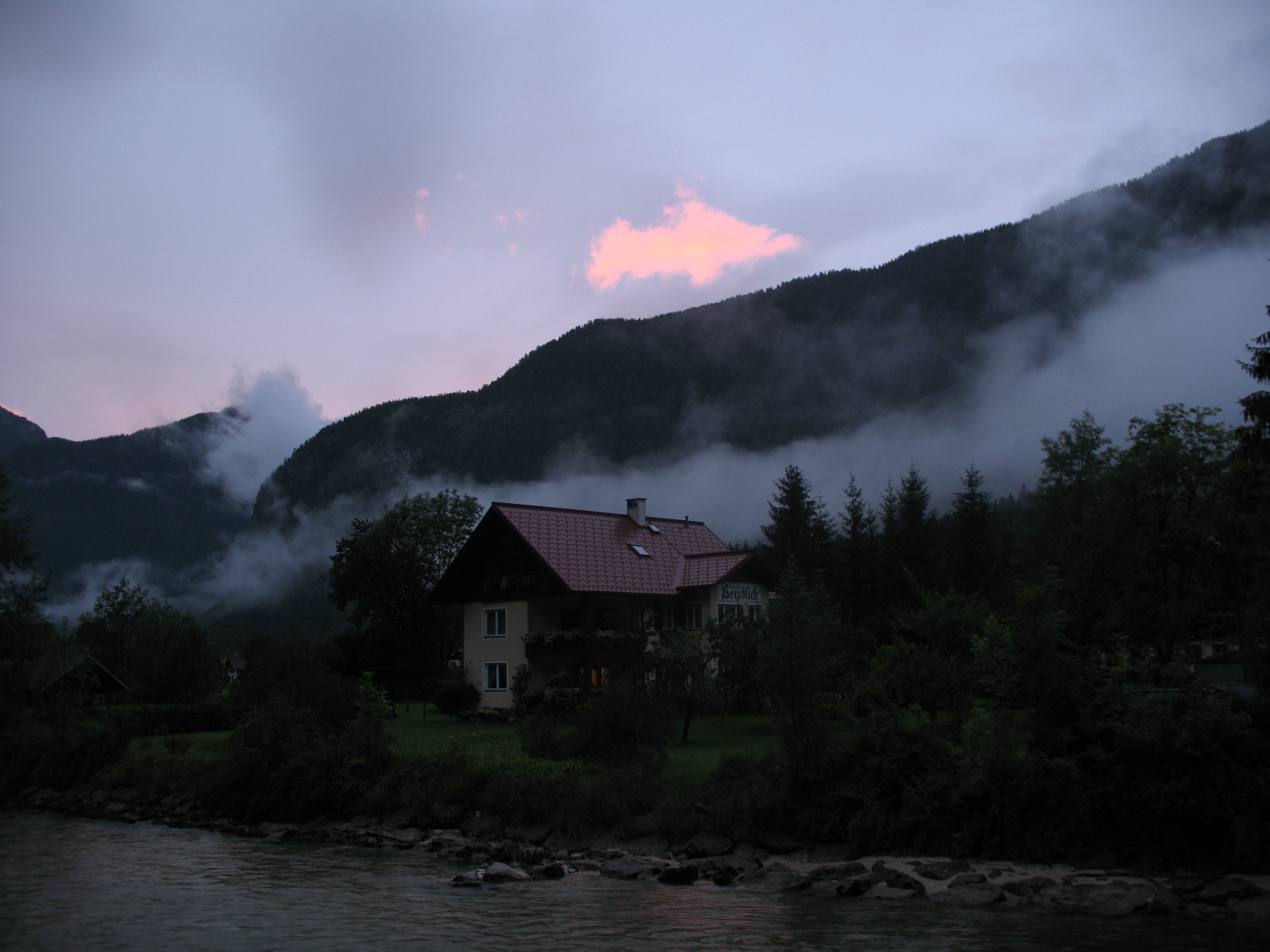
Obertraun

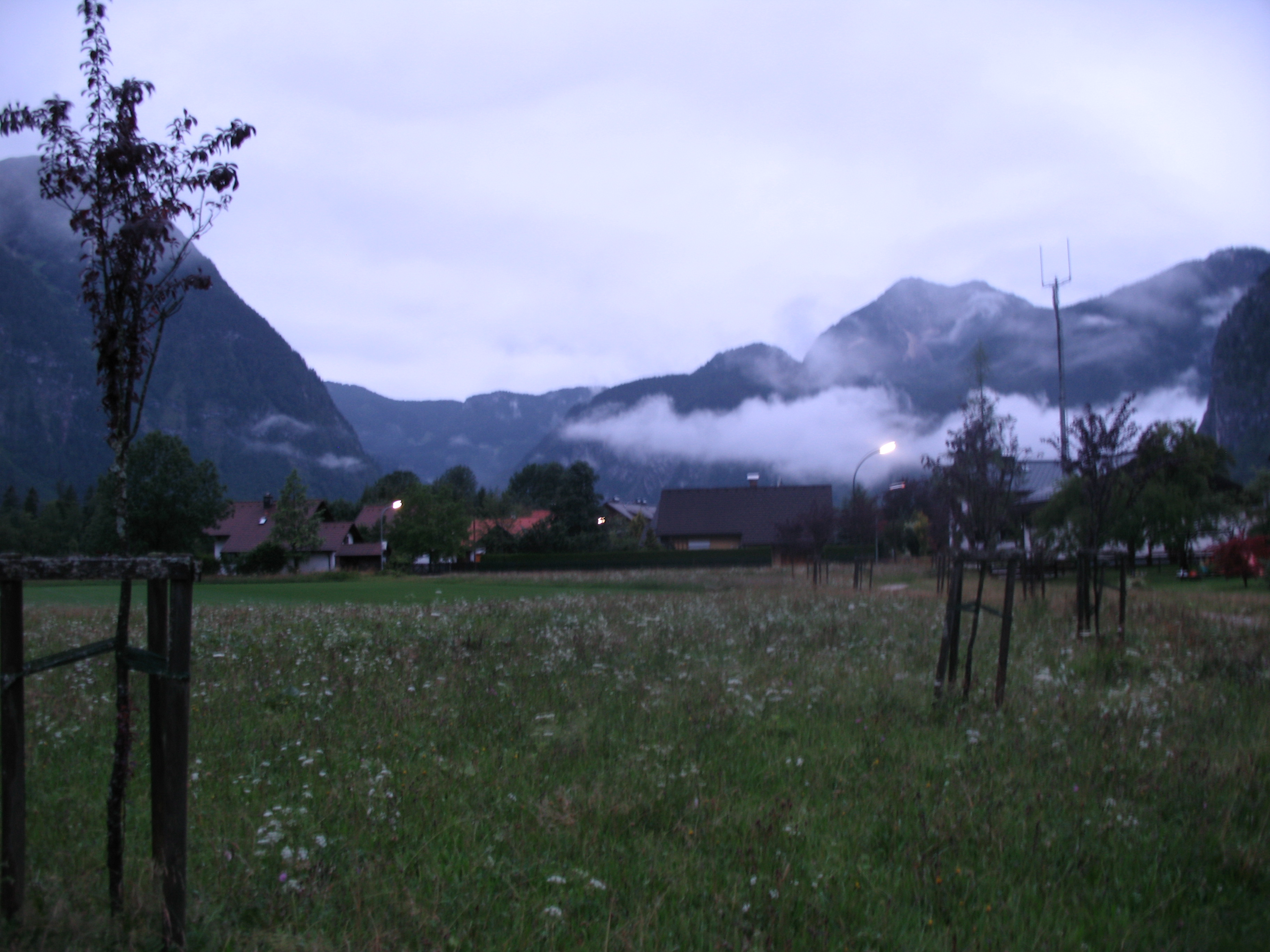
Obertraun

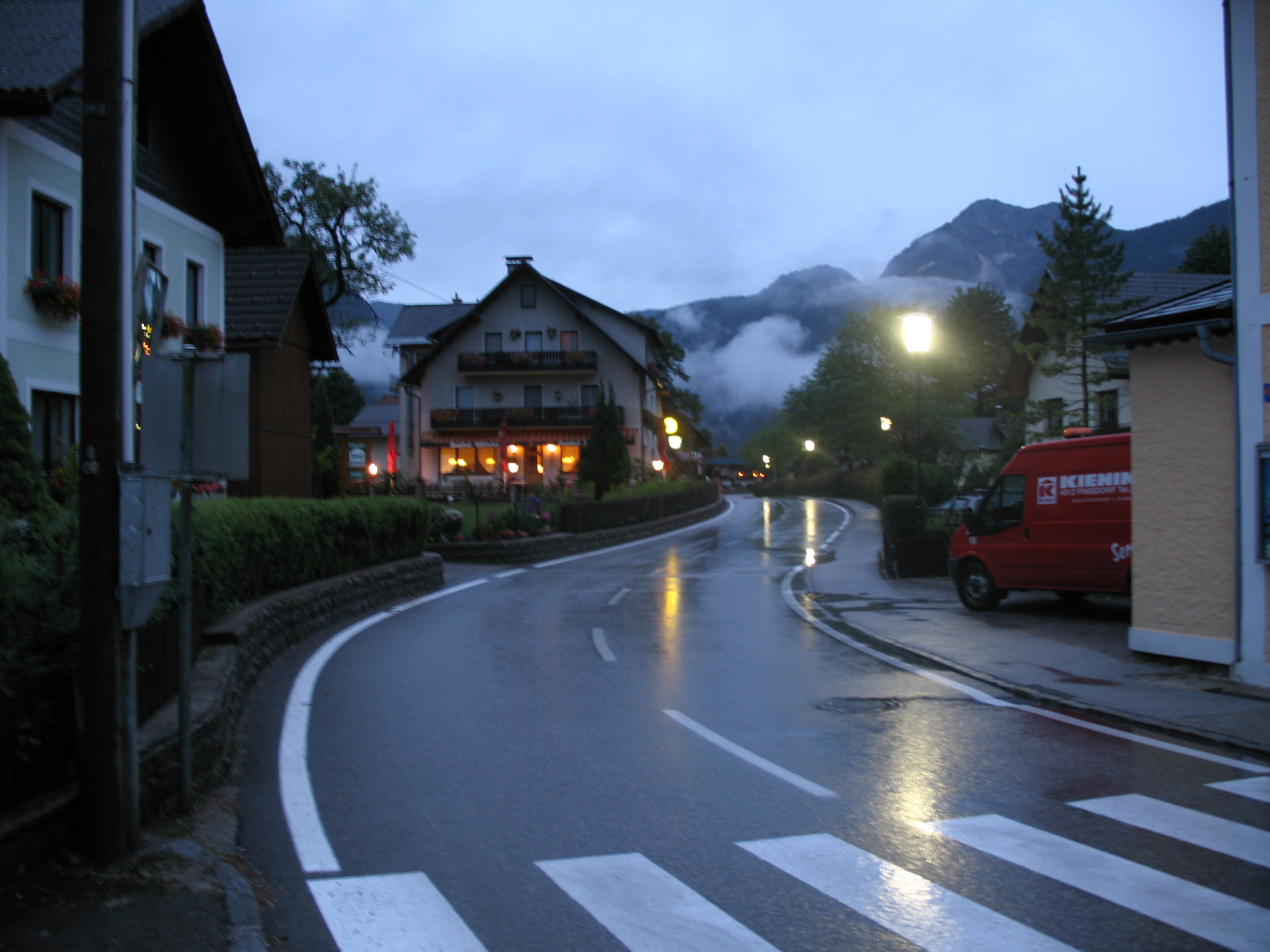
Obertraun

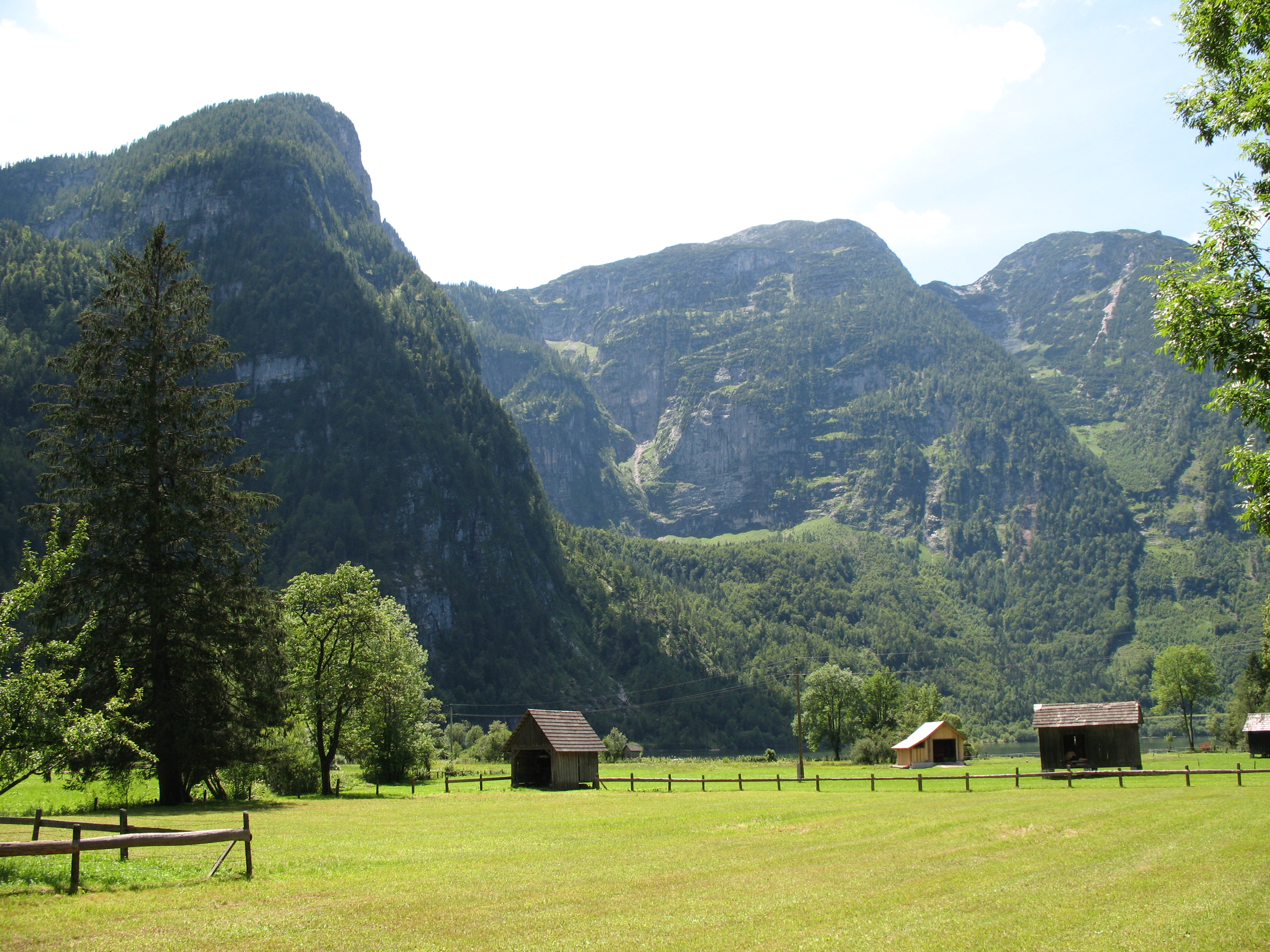
Winkler-Traunweg

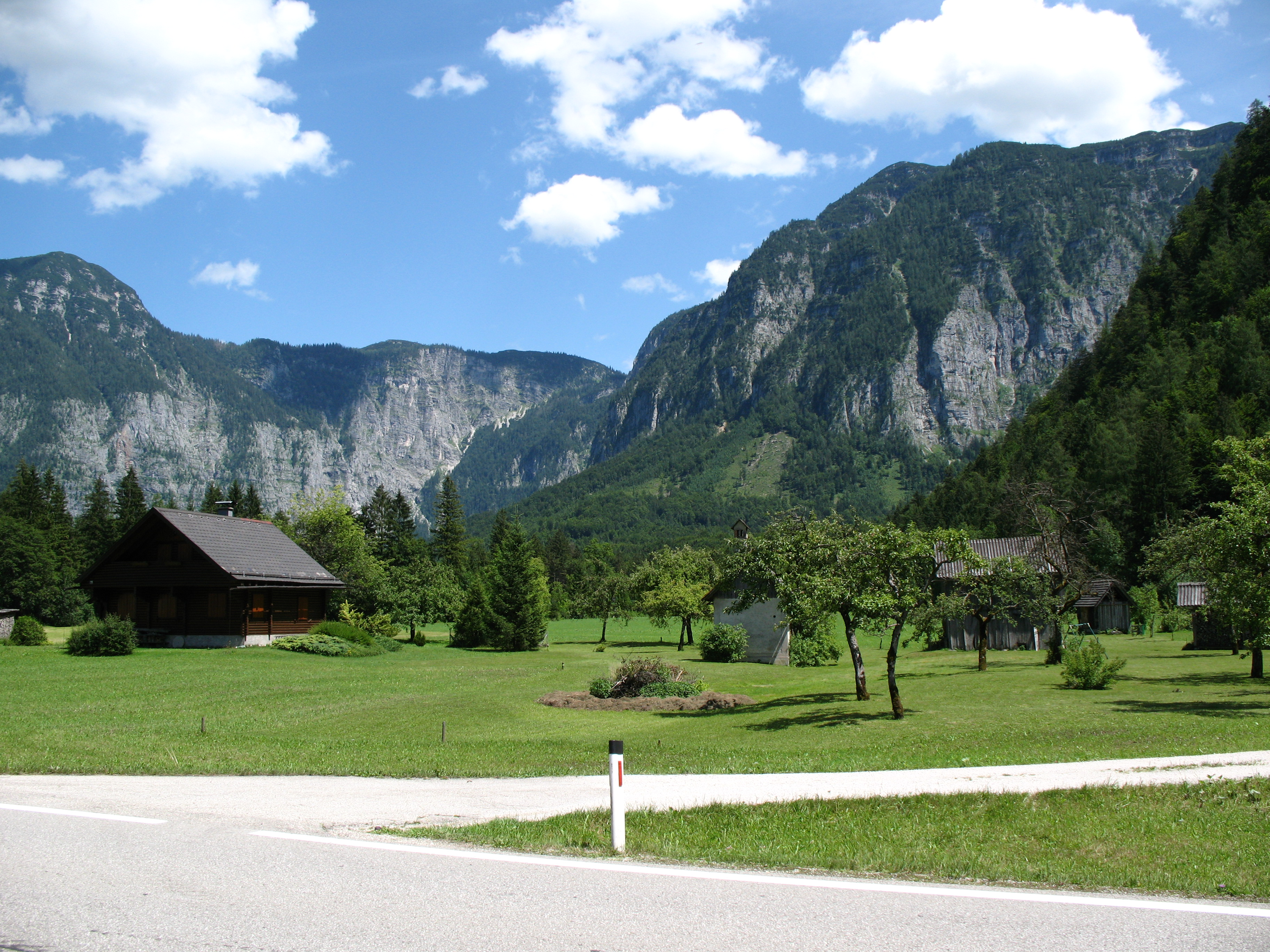
Hallstätterseestrasse

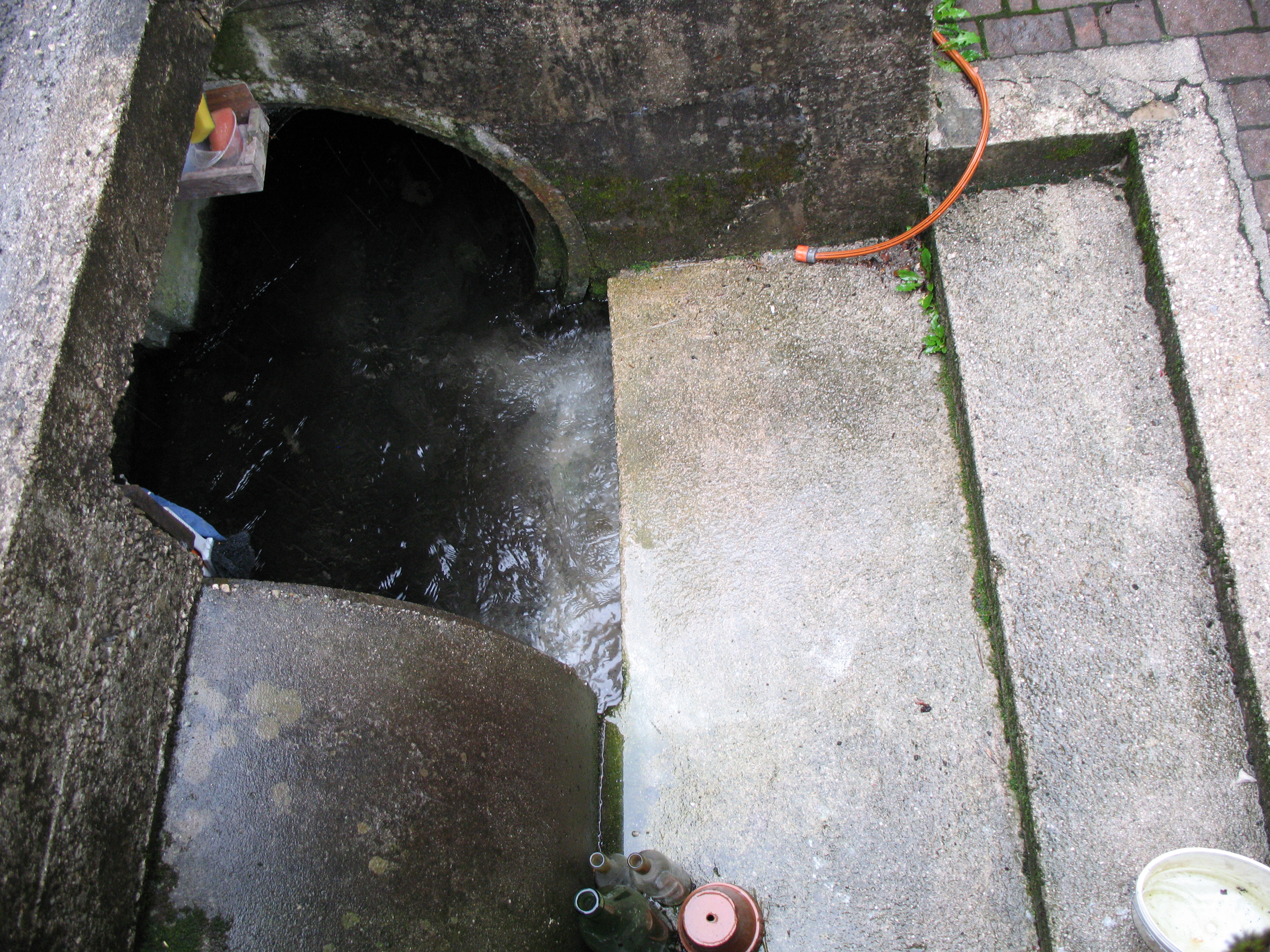
Stormwater system
