= Demetris Kyriakou =

Cypriot footballer

Personal information
- Full name: Demetris Kyriakou
- Date of birth: October 14, 1986 (age 40)
- Place of birth: Nicosia, Cyprus
- Height: 1.72 m (5 ft 7 1/2 in)
- Position: Defensive midfielder

Team information
- Current team: ASIL Lysi
- Number: 8

Youth career
- APOEL

Senior career*
Years	Team	Apps	(Gls)
2004–2011	APOEL	7	(0)
2005–2006	→ THOI Lakatamia (loan)	9	(0)
2007–2008	→ Digenis Morphou (loan)	17	(0)
2010	→ Olympiakos Nicosia (loan)	10	(0)
2011–2012	Anagennisi Dherynia	22	(0)
2012–	AEK Larnaca	1	(0)
2013–2014	→ Ethnikos Achna (loan)	2	(0)
2014–2018	ASIL Lysi		

International career^{‡}
2007	Cyprus U21	2	(0)
- * Club domestic league appearances and goals as of April 3, 2015 ‡ National team caps and goals as of July 10, 2009

Demetris Kyriakou (Greek: Δημήτρης Κυριάκου; born 14 October 1986) is a Cypriot footballer who plays for ASIL Lysi as a defensive midfielder.

== Career ==
He is a product of APOEL's youth academies and was once considered a "young ace" of the club. He was first sent on loan to ENTHOI Lakatamia FC in the 2005–2006 season, but he returned to APOEL for the 2006–07 season, where he became champion for first time in his career. He was sent on loan again to Digenis Akritas Morphou in the 2007–2008 season. In June 2008 he returned to APOEL and was part of the squad that was crowned Champions. In January 2010, he was sent for third time on loan to Olympiakos Nicosia for six months, and contributed to the team's promotion to the First Division. He returned to APOEL for the 2010–11 season, but suffered a torn cruciate ligament in the first practice of the season, and had very limited opportunities to play. His contrast was not renewed in 2011, after 9 years at APOEL.

In July 2011, he signed a one-year contract with the Cypriot First Division club Anagennisi Dherynia.

On 20 June 2012, Kyriakou signed a contract with AEK Larnaca, after reportedly having been targeted by the club for a "long time". He did not "catch on" at the club despite the initial expectations, and was therefore loaned out to Ethnikos Achna in 2013.

He joined ASIL Lysi in 2014 and left this club in 2018.
