= Joost Broerse =

Dutch former footballer

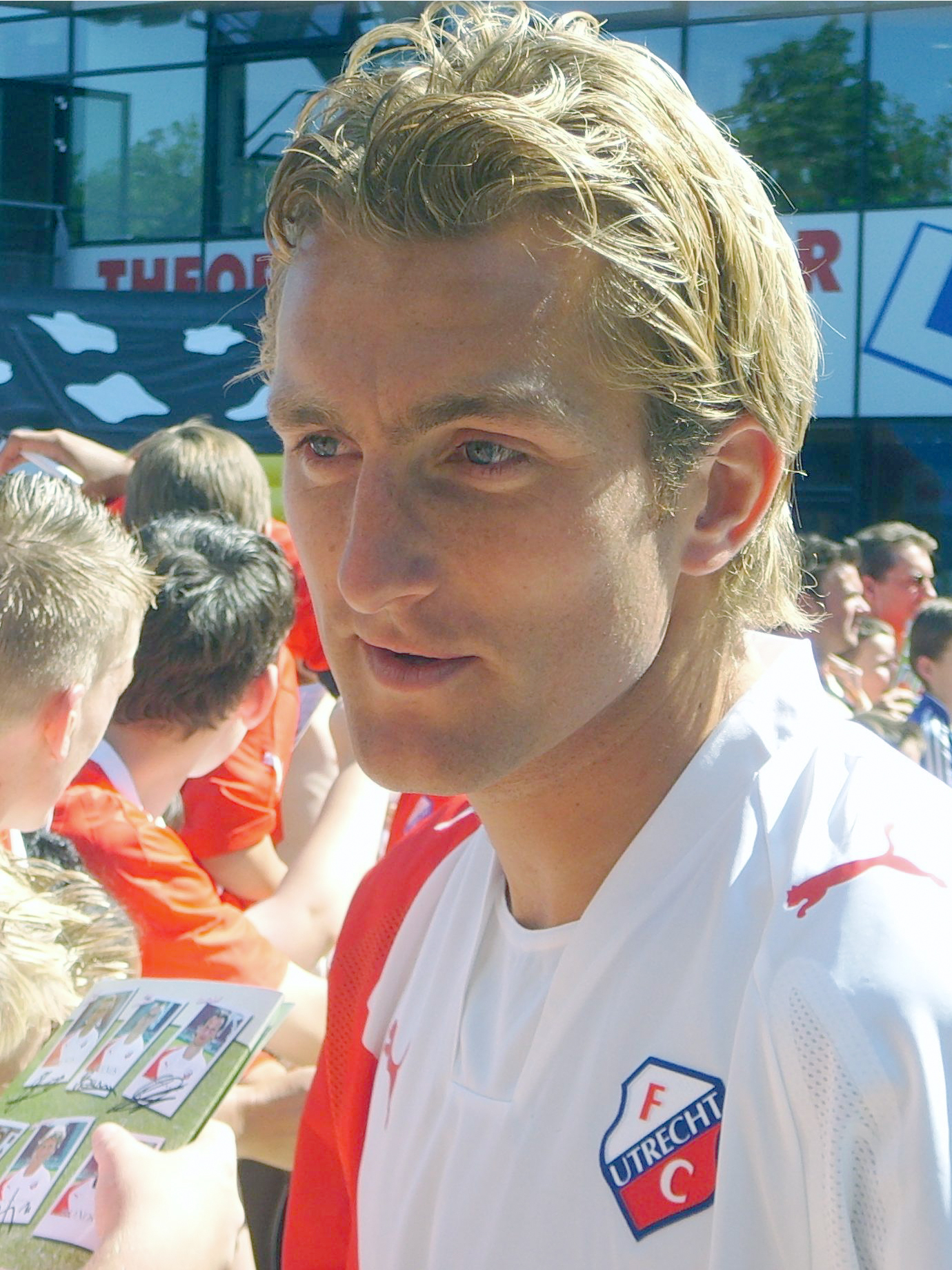

Personal information
- Full name: Joost Broerse
- Date of birth: 8 May 1979 (age 47)
- Place of birth: De Bilt, Netherlands
- Height: 1.84 m (6 ft 0 in)
- Positions: Centre back; defensive midfielder

Youth career
- Utrecht

Senior career*
Years	Team	Apps	(Gls)
1997–2003	Groningen	149	(19)
2003–2008	Utrecht	117	(6)
2008–2011	APOEL	74	(4)
2011–2012	Excelsior	28	(1)
2012–2015	PEC Zwolle	80	(5)
Total		448	(35)

International career
2000-2001	Netherlands U21	10	(0)
- * Club domestic league appearances and goals

Joost Broerse (Dutch pronunciation: [joːst ˈbruːrsə]; born 8 May 1979) is a Dutch retired footballer who played as a centre back or defensive midfielder.

== Club career ==
=== Groningen / Utrecht ===
Broerse made his debut in professional football, being part of the FC Groningen squad in the 1997–98 season and stayed there for six years. Then he moved to FC Utrecht, where he stayed for four years and won the 2003–04 KNVB Cup and the 2004 Johan Cruijff-schaal.

=== APOEL ===
Later, in January 2008, he transferred to Cypriot side APOEL. At APOEL he won the 2007–08 Cypriot Cup, the 2008–09 Cypriot First Division and also the Cypriot Super Cup of 2008 and 2009. He also appeared in four official group stages matches of the 2009–10 UEFA Champions League with APOEL. The next season, he won the 2010–11 Cypriot First Division again with APOEL, adding the second championship title to his honours list. In May 2011 it was announced that Broerse would be leaving APOEL after 3.5 years, as his contract would not be renewed by the club.

=== Excelsior / PEC Zwolle ===
In August 2011 he signed a one-year contract with the Dutch club Excelsior. In June 2012 he moved to PEC Zwolle, where he managed to win the 2013–14 KNVB Cup.

Broerse retired in 2015 to become commercial director at Zwolle.

== International career ==
Broerse played 10 games for the Netherlands national under-21 football team.

== Honours ==
=== Club ===
FC Utrecht

- KNVB Cup: 2003–04
- Johan Cruijff-schaal: 2004

APOEL

- Cypriot First Division: 2008–09, 2010–11
- Cypriot Cup: 2007–08
- Cypriot Super Cup: 2008, 2009

PEC Zwolle

- KNVB Cup: 2013–14
- Johan Cruijff-schaal: 2014
