= Jean Paulista =

Brazilian footballer

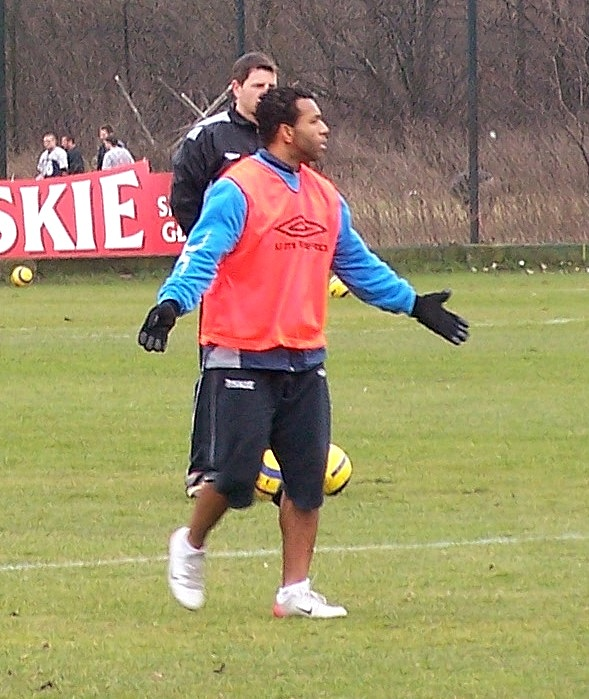
- Paulista training with Wisła Kraków in 2007

Personal information
- Full name: Jean Francisco Rodrigues
- Date of birth: 28 November 1977 (age 48)
- Place of birth: Sertãozinho, Brazil
- Height: 1.80 m (5 ft 11 in)
- Positions: Forward; midfielder

Senior career*
Years	Team	Apps	(Gls)
1996–1997	Corinthians-AL		
1997–1998	Taubaté		
1998–2001	Farense	42	(3)
1999	→ Braga (loan)	6	(0)
1999–2000	→ Aves (loan)	9	(2)
2001	→ Imortal (loan)	11	(2)
2001–2003	Vitória Setúbal	33	(1)
2003–2004	Aves	32	(7)
2004–2005	Maia	30	(7)
2005–2008	Wisła Kraków	54	(10)
2008–2010	APOEL	18	(2)
2010–2011	AEK Larnaca	8	(1)
2011–2012	Polonia Bytom	21	(4)
2012	LZS Piotrówka	5	(0)
2013	Skra Częstochowa	11	(1)
2013–2014	Polonia Bytom	11	(0)
Total		291	(40)
- * Club domestic league appearances and goals

Jean Francisco Rodrigues (born 28 November 1977), commonly known as Jean Paulista, is a Brazilian former professional footballer who played as a forward or an attacking midfielder.

== Club career ==
Born in Sertãozinho, São Paulo, Paulista played with modest Sport Club Corinthians Alagoano and Esporte Clube Taubaté in his country. In 1998, he moved to Portugal where he remained for the following seven years, representing S.C. Farense, S.C. Braga and Vitória F.C. in the Primeira Liga and C.D. Aves, Imortal D.C. and F.C. Maia in the second division. His best personal output, in the country and overall, came in the 2003–04 season, when he scored seven goals to help Aves to the eighth position.

From 2005 to 2008, Paulista competed in Polish Ekstraklasa with Wisła Kraków, netting five times in 27 appearances in his second year. In July 2008, he signed a two-year contract with APOEL FC in the Cypriot First Division, making his official debut for his new club in the first qualifying round of the UEFA Cup; also in that competition, against Red Star Belgrade, he suffered a serious injury which sidelined him for almost a year.

Paulista returned to full fitness in the 2009–10 season, scoring twice to help APOEL to the second position. He made three appearances in that campaign's UEFA Champions League.

After spending the 2010–11 season with AEK Larnaca, Paulista returned to Poland where he played in the lower leagues, starting with Polonia Bytom, until his retirement at the start of 2014.
