= Nektarios Alexandrou =

Greek Cypriot international footballer

Personal information
- Full name: Nektarios Alexandrou
- Date of birth: 19 December 1983 (age 42)
- Place of birth: Nicosia, Cyprus
- Height: 1.82 m (6 ft 0 in)
- Positions: Left back; left winger

Youth career
- APOEL

Senior career*
Years	Team	Apps	(Gls)
2000–2006	APOEL	103	(24)
2006–2008	AEL	31	(2)
2008–2019	APOEL	198	(14)
2019	Doxa Katokopia	20	(0)

International career^{‡}
2006–	Cyprus	40	(0)
- * Club domestic league appearances and goals as of 29 October 2019 ‡ National team caps and goals as of 29 December 2017

Nektarios Alexandrou (Greek: Νεκτάριος Αλεξάνδρου; born 19 December 1983 in Nicosia, Cyprus) is a Greek Cypriot former professional footballer. He was a left flank specialist, but he primarily played as the left winger.

== Career ==
=== APOEL ===
Alexandrou started his career at APOEL's Academy. He made his debut with APOEL in 2000–01 season. He became a regular member of the team in 2002–03 season and stayed to APOEL until the summer of 2006, playing in total 103 matches and scoring 24 goals. During these years at APOEL, he won 2 championships, 1 Cup and 2 Super cups.

=== Larissa ===
On summer of 2006 he moved to AEL in Greece. Together with Efstathios Aloneftis were part of an important Larissa investment on Cypriot young players. At his first season in Larissa he managed to win the 2006–07 Greek Cup. Alexandrou was considered one of the most important players for Larissa after the team returned to the Super League Greece. He became a starter in Larissa's roster and in the 2007/08 season, scoring important goals in both domestic and European competitions, including a goal against Russian champions FC Zenit Saint Petersburg.

On 13 August 2008, it was announced by Larissa's official website that Alexandrou's contract was terminated. The reason was unknown.

=== APOEL ===
Alexandrou re-signed at APOEL on summer of 2008. His return came with the success of winning the 2008–09 Cypriot First Division, with Nektarios being an instrumental part of the team. He also appeared in four official 2009–10 UEFA Champions League group stage matches with APOEL.

The next season, he helped APOEL to win the 2010–11 Cypriot First Division, winning his fourth championship title in his career. He also appeared in six 2011–12 UEFA Champions League matches for APOEL, in the club's surprising run to the quarter-finals of the competition, including the round-of-16 triumph over Olympique Lyonnais where he converted his attempt in the penalty shootout.

The following season he won again the 2012–13 Cypriot First Division, which was his 5th league title in his career with APOEL. During the 2013–14 season, he appeared in five group stage matches of APOEL's UEFA Europa League participation and scored the opening goal in APOEL's 2–1 victory against Bordeaux at GSP Stadium. He also managed to win all the titles in Cyprus that season, the Cypriot League, the Cypriot Cup and the Cypriot Super Cup.

Alexandrou made his only group stage appearance in APOEL's 2014–15 UEFA Champions League campaign on 10 December 2014, playing the full 90 minutes in his team's 4–0 defeat against Ajax at Amsterdam Arena. In the 2014–15 season, he managed to add two more titles to his collection, as APOEL won again both the Cypriot championship and the cup.

After the end of the 2015–16 season, in which he crowned champion for a fourth time in the row, Alexandrou signed a new one-year contract extension with APOEL, becoming also the team's captain.

== International career ==
Alexandrou made his international debut with Cyprus National Team on 1 March 2006, in a friendly match against Armenia at Tsirion Stadium, coming on as a 74th-minute substitute in Cyprus' 2–0 victory.

== Personal life ==
On 2 January 2011 Alexandrou's then girlfriend Marianna Nikolaou, gave birth to their son Ectoras.

From 2014 to 2021, Alexandrou was married to Cypriot TV presenter and former model Constantina Evripidou. They have two children: a daughter Ariadne (born 19 December 2015) and a son Nicolas (born 6 May 2020).

== Honours ==
APOEL

- Cypriot First Division (10) : 2001–02, 2003–04, 2008–09, 2010–11, 2012–13, 2013–14, 2014–15, 2015–16, 2017–18, 2016–17
- Cypriot Cup (3) : 2005–06, 2013–14, 2014–15
- Cypriot Super Cup (6) : 2002, 2004, 2008, 2009, 2011, 2013

Larissa

- Greek Cup: 2006–07
