= Michalis Morfis =

Cypriot footballer (born 1979)

Personal information
- Full name: Michalis Morfis
- Date of birth: 15 January 1979 (age 47)
- Place of birth: Nicosia, Cyprus
- Height: 1.83 m (6 ft 0 in)
- Position: Goalkeeper

Team information
- Current team: Doxa Katokopias
- Number: 12

Youth career
- APOEL

Senior career*
Years	Team	Apps	(Gls)
1997–2010	APOEL	198	(0)
2010–2012	PAEEK FC	50	(0)
2012	Anagennisi Dherynia	8	(0)
2013–2016	Doxa Katokopias	18	(0)

International career^{‡}
2001–2011	Cyprus	22	(0)
- * Club domestic league appearances and goals as of 26 August 2015 ‡ National team caps and goals as of 9 February 2011

Michalis Morfis (Greek: Μιχάλης Μορφής) (born January 15, 1979) is a former Cypriot former football goalkeeper who last played for Doxa Katokopias in Cypriot First Division.

== Club career ==
He was a key member of APOEL from 1997 until 2010.

He came out of APOEL's youth system and he has proven himself in the Cypriot Championship and also internationally through the national team, qualification matches of UEFA Champions League and UEFA Cup.

== International career ==
Morfis is also a member of the Cypriot national team, having 22 appearances.
