= Marinos Satsias =

Cypriot footballer

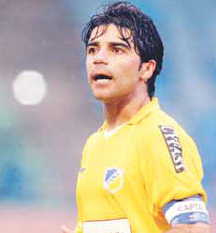
- Satsias with APOEL in 2007

Personal information
- Date of birth: 24 May 1978 (age 48)
- Place of birth: Nicosia, Cyprus
- Height: 1.74 m (5 ft 9 in)
- Position: Defensive midfielder

Youth career
- APOEL

Senior career*
Years	Team	Apps	(Gls)
1995–2014	APOEL	281	(23)

International career
2000–2012	Cyprus	65	(0)

Managerial career
- 2015–2016: APOEL (assistant)
- 2016–2017: Ethnikos Latsion
- 2017–2019: Omonia Aradippou
- 2019: Sparta
- 2019: Anagennisi Deryneia
- 2020: Cyprus U16
- 2020–2021: Ermis Aradippou
- 2021: Doxa Katokopia
- 2021–2023: Enosis Neon Paralimni
- 2023: Karmiotissa
- 2023–2024: Ethnikos Achna
- 2024: Lamia
- 2024–2025: AEL Limassol
- 2025–2026: Omonia Aradippou
- * Club domestic league appearances and goals

Marinos Satsias (Greek: Μαρίνος Σατσιάς; born 24 May 1978) is a Cypriot professional football manager and former player.

== Playing career ==
Satsias was a right-footed defensive midfielder. He made his debut for APOEL in 1995 at the age of seventeen. He was known for his passion and discipline in the game.

During his career with APOEL, Marinos won 8 Championships, 6 Cups, 8 Super Cups and appeared in three official 2009–10 UEFA Champions League group stage matches in APOEL's first UEFA Champions League participation. He also appeared in one 2011–12 UEFA Champions League match for APOEL (against Real Madrid at Santiago Bernabéu Stadium), in the club's surprising run to the quarter-finals of the competition.

In his last season (2013–14) as a player, APOEL's captain managed to lift all the season's trophies in Cyprus, the Cypriot League, the Cypriot Cup and the Cypriot Super Cup, retiring as a domestic treble winner.
