= Marios Elia =

Cypriot footballer (born 1979)

Personal information
- Full name: Marios Elia
- Date of birth: 14 April 1979 (age 47)
- Place of birth: Lythrodontas, Nicosia, Cyprus
- Height: 1.75 m (5 ft 9 in)
- Position: Defender

Senior career*
Years	Team	Apps	(Gls)
1998–2014	APOEL	176	(13)
2000–2001	→ Doxa Katokopias (loan)	22	(2)
2008	→ Ethnikos Achna (loan)	11	(0)
Total		209	(15)

International career^{‡}
2003–2011	Cyprus	51	(2)

Managerial career
- 2015–2016: Olympiakos Nicosia (assistant manager)
- * Club domestic league appearances and goals as of 31 May 2014 ‡ National team caps and goals as of 10 August 2011

Marios Elia (Greek: Μάριος Ηλία; born 14 April 1979 in Nicosia) is a retired Cypriot professional footballer and manager of the restaurant Ivory in Nicosia.

== Career ==
Marios Elia spent almost his entire career playing for APOEL, where he won 7 Championships, 4 Cups, 6 Super Cups and appeared in four official 2009–10 UEFA Champions League group stage matches in APOEL's first UEFA Champions League participation. He also appeared in one 2011–12 UEFA Champions League match for APOEL, in the club's surprising run to the quarter-finals of the competition. In his last season (2013–14) as a player, APOEL's vice-captain managed to win all the season's trophies in Cyprus, the Cypriot League, the Cypriot Cup and the Cypriot Super Cup, retiring as a domestic treble winner.

== Honours ==
APOEL

- Cypriot First Division (7) : 2001–02, 2003–04, 2006–07, 2008–09, 2010–11, 2012–13, 2013–14
- Cypriot Cup (4) : 1998–99, 2005–06, 2007–08, 2013–14
- Cypriot Super Cup (6) : 2002, 2004, 2008, 2009, 2011, 2013
