= Andreas Papathanasiou =

Cypriot footballer (born 1983)

Personal information
- Full name: Andreas Papathanasiou
- Date of birth: October 3, 1983 (age 43)
- Place of birth: Larnaca, Cyprus
- Height: 1.89 m (6 ft 2 in)
- Position: Forward

Senior career*
Years	Team	Apps	(Gls)
2004–2008	Ermis Aradippou	97	(80)
2008–2010	APOEL	18	(3)
2009	→ Ermis Aradippou (loan)	12	(10)
2010–2011	Anorthosis	0	(0)
2010–2011	→ Ermis Aradippou (loan)	20	(3)
2011–2015	Ermis Aradippou	93	(12)
2015–2016	AEZ Zakakiou	23	(15)
2016–2017	Alki Oroklini	23	(14)
2017–2019	Onisilos Sotira	56	(26)
2019–2023	Ermis Aradippou	85	(14)

International career
2008–2014	Cyprus	6	(0)
- * Club domestic league appearances and goals

Andreas Papathanasiou (Greek: Ανδρέας Παπαθανασίου; born 3 October 1983) is a Cypriot footballer who plays as a forward.

== Club career ==
Papathanasiou was a key player for Ermis Aradippou and he was the top scorer in the second division for the last two seasons (2006–07, 2007–08).

APOEL offered him a 2 years contract in June 2008 and he join the club. In January 2009 he was given on loan back to Ermis Aradippou FC and helped the club to win the second division championship. In May 2009 he returned to APOEL and been part of the Champions of first division too. He also appeared in two official group stages matches of the 2009–10 UEFA Champions League with APOEL.

On Monday, 31 May 2010 Andreas signed a contract with Anorthosis Famagusta FC. He appeared only in three 2010–11 UEFA Europa League matches with Anorthosis and two months later, on 2 August 2010, the team manager Guillermo Angel Hoyos decided to put the player on loan to another team. So, he moved on loan for another time to Ermis Aradippou for the 2010–11 season.

== International career ==
He made his official debut for the national team on the World Cup Qualifier game against Ireland on October 15, 2008.
