= 2012–13 APOEL FC season =

APOEL
2012–13 season
- Chairman: Phivos Erotokritou
- Manager: Ivan Jovanović
- Stadium: GSP Stadium, Nicosia
- Cypriot First Division: Winners
- Cypriot Cup: Second round
- UEFA Europa League: Play-off round
- Top goalscorer: League: Aldo Adorno (13); All: Aldo Adorno (15)
- Highest home attendance: 20,337 vs Neftchi Baku (30 August 2012 – UEFA Europa League)
- Lowest home attendance: 2,917 vs Chalkanoras (31 October 2012 – Cypriot Cup)
- Average home league attendance: 10,436 (all competitions)
Home colours	Away colours	Third colours

The 2012–13 season was APOEL's 73rd season in the Cypriot First Division and 85th year in existence as a football club.

== Season review ==
=== Pre-season and friendlies ===
The first training session for the season took place on 11 June 2012 at APOEL's training centre. On 23 June 2012, the team flew to Obertraun in Austria to perform the main stage of their pre-season training and returned to Cyprus on 7 July 2012. During the pre-season training stage in Austria, APOEL played four friendly matches against Blau-Weiss Linz, MFK Košice, SK Sturm Graz and SV Ried. APOEL lost 1–2 by Blau-Weiss Linz, drew 1–1 with SK Sturm Graz and won MFK Košice by 2–0 and SV Ried by 3–2.

=== Cypriot First Division ===
==== Regular season ====
On 3 September 2012, APOEL opened their competitive season with a 0–5 win at the Tasos Markou Stadium against Enosis Neon Paralimni. Aldo Adorno scored a hat-trick, while Gustavo Manduca and Constantinos Charalambides scored two more goals for APOEL. On 16 September 2012, APOEL hosted Doxa Katokopias at GSP Stadium, in a match which was played behind closed doors. APOEL won 3–1, with Aldo Adorno scoring twice and Efstathios Aloneftis adding another one to the scoreline. On 22 September 2012, APOEL won 1–3 Alki at Larnaca, with Mario Budimir, Gustavo Manduca and Aldo Adorno scoring one goal each. On 30 September 2012, APOEL beat Apollon Limassol 1–0 at home, with Aldo Adorno scoring the winning goal in the 79th minute. On 7 October 2012, Omonia hosted APOEL at GSP Stadium in a match which ended in a goalless draw. On 22 October 2012, APOEL won Olympiakos Nicosia at home by 4–0, with two goals from Nuno Morais and one goal from Aldo Adorno and Gustavo Manduca. On 27 October 2012, APOEL beat Nea Salamina at Ammochostos Stadium by 0–3. Hélio Pinto opened the score in the first half and Efstathios Aloneftis who came on as a substitute scored twice in the second half. On 5 November 2012, APOEL's impressive run continued by winning Ayia Napa 4–1 at home, with a hat-trick from Aldo Adorno and a goal from Gustavo Manduca. On 11 November 2012, Aritz Borda's goal gave APOEL a narrow 0–1 win over Ethnikos Achna at Dasaki Stadium. On 18 November 2012, APOEL suffered its first league defeat after losing 1–2 at home to AEK Larnaca and fell out of first place for the first time during the season. Albert Serrán opened the score in the first half and Hélio Pinto equalised early in the second half before Jason Demetriou score the winner for AEK. On 26 November 2012, APOEL beat reigning champions AEL Limassol by 1–3 at Tsirion Stadium and became the first team which won AEL this season. Hélio Pinto opened the scoring in the 4th minute and AEL equalised ten minutes later but Gustavo Manduca in the 23rd minute gave APOEL the lead again. Despite APOEL was playing with ten players for almost 30 minutes after Aritz Borda was shown the red card in the 64th minute, Constantinos Charalambides scored a third goal ten minutes before the end to give APOEL a very important victory. On 2 December 2012, APOEL beat AEP Paphos by 0–2 at Pafiako Stadium, with two goals scored from Gustavo Manduca and Selim Benachour. On 8 December 2012, APOEL suffered its second league defeat, losing 0–1 at home to Anorthosis and remained in second place, four points behind leaders Anorthosis. On 15 December 2012, Aldo Adorno's goal in the 76th minute gave APOEL a narrow 1–0 home win over Enosis Neon Paralimni. On 22 December 2012, APOEL won 0–3 at Doxa Katokopias, with Gustavo Manduca scoring twice in the first half and Aldo Adorno scoring another one in the second half. On 6 January 2013, APOEL drew 1–1 with Alki Larnaca at home, with a last-minute equalising goal from Mário Sérgio. On 14 January 2013, APOEL faced Apollon Limassol at Tsirion Stadium and won by 1–2 with a last-minute winner. Apollon took the lead in the first half, but Selim Benachour's early equaliser in the second half and Hélio Pinto's free-kick winner in the 12th minute of added time secured an important victory for APOEL. On 19 January 2013, APOEL drew 1–1 against eternal rivals Omonia, with Hélio Pinto opening the score early in the first half and Omonia equalising after one hour of play. On 27 January 2013, Gustavo Manduca scored twice in the second half and helped APOEL to beat Olympiakos Nicosia by 0–2 at GSP Stadium. On 2 February 2013, APOEL got a 2–0 home victory against Nea Salamina, in a behind closed doors match. Nektarios Alexandrou opened the scoreline in the first half and Dudu Biton scored on his debut just five minutes after being subbed in the 85th minute. On 11 February 2013, APOEL record its third consecutive 2–0 league win – this time over Ayia Napa at Tasos Markou Stadium – by two goals of Aritz Borda and Dudu Biton. On 27 February 2013, APOEL faced Ethnikos Achna at home in a behind closed doors match and won by 1–0 with an early second half goal from Dudu Biton. On 3 March 2013, APOEL beat AEK Larnaca by 0–1 at GSZ Stadium, with Mikkel Beckmann netting the game's only goal with long-range effort in the 75th minute. So, after 23rd matchweek results, APOEL was only one point behind leaders Anorthosis. On 9 March 2013, Nektarios Alexandrou scored twice to lead APOEL to 2–0 home victory over AEL Limassol and APOEL moved up to first place after four months. On 17 March 2013, APOEL demolished AEP Paphos 6–0 at home, recording seven consecutive wins without conceding a goal and opened up a three-point gap over the second placed team Anorthosis. Mário Sérgio and Mikkel Beckmann scored APOEL's first two goals, while Dudu Biton and Constantinos Charalambides each scored twice for the final 6–0 victory for APOEL. On 31 March 2013, APOEL achieved the most important victory (so far) in the season by beating the second placed team Anorthosis 0–2 at Antonis Papadopoulos Stadium and opened up a six-point gap from its rivals. Dudu Biton gave his team the lead after 68 minutes of play and Nuno Morais secured APOEL's victory 12 minutes later with a long range effort.

==== Play–offs ====
On 6 April 2013, APOEL suffered its first defeat after an eight straight wins run, losing 3–0 at Omonia in the first Championship play-off match. The same time Anorthosis also lost 0–3 at home by AEK Larnaca and so APOEL remained at top with a six-point gap from the second place. On 13 April 2013, APOEL hosted Anorthosis and maintained their six-point advantage thanks to a 0–0 draw at GSP Stadium. On 21 April 2013, APOEL beat AEK Larnaca 0–1 at GSZ Stadium, thanks to Mário Sérgio's direct free-kick in the 63rd minute and opened up an eight-point gap over the second placed team Anorthosis who drew 0–0 against Omonia. On 27 April 2013, APOEL lost 0–1 at home to AEK Larnaca, but one day later Anorthosis also lost 4–0 at Omonia and APOEL were eventually crowned champions for the 22nd time in their history after a very difficult and harsh season. On 12 May 2013, APOEL celebrated their 22nd Championship title in style with an impressive 4–3 win over their arch rivals Omonia and ensured coach Ivan Jovanović’s last home game was a memorable one. Efstathios Aloneftis scored his first goal against his former club, Mario Budimir and Nuno Morais also got on the score sheet, before Gustavo Manduca scoring the winner in the 83rd minute after converting a penalty. At the end of the match, Marinos Satsias, Constantinos Charalambidis and Ivan Jovanović lifted all together the Championship trophy in front of 16,000 fans to officially crown APOEL as the Cypriot First Division champions for the season. On 18 May 2013, APOEL lost at Anorthosis by 2–1, while Gustavo Manduca scored his 12th league goal, in APOEL's last match of the season.

=== Cypriot Cup ===
On 31 October 2012, APOEL beat Chalkanoras by 8–1 at GSP Stadium and qualified for the second round of the 2012–13 Cypriot Cup. Both Constantinos Charalambides and Esteban Solari scored a hat-trick, while Selim Benachour and Mário Sérgio scored two more goals for APOEL. In the second round, APOEL drawn against AEL Limassol. In the first leg match which was held on 9 January 2013, APOEL won 0–2 at Tsirion Stadium with a goal from Michael Klukowski and an own goal from Edmar. In the second leg which was held at GSP Stadium on 23 January 2013, APOEL took the lead in the 2nd minute of the match but AEL surprisingly managed to score three goals to make it 1–3 and qualified for the quarter-finals on away goals rule after a 3–3 aggregate.

=== UEFA Europa League ===
The team finished 2nd in the Cypriot First Division last season and as such entered the second qualifying round of the 2012–13 UEFA Europa League, drawing with Slovak club FK Senica. APOEL qualified for the next round by winning 2–0 (Aílton, Nektarios Alexandrou) at home and 1–0 (Hélio Pinto) at Senica. In the third qualifying round APOEL faced Aalesunds FK from Norway and qualified for the play-offs by winning 2–1 (Mário Sérgio, Efstathios Aloneftis) at home and 1–0 (Aldo Adorno) at Ålesund. In the play-offs APOEL eliminated from Neftchi Baku by drawing 1–1 (Selim Benachour) at Baku and losing 1–3 (Selim Benachour) unexpectedly at home.

== Current squad ==
Last Update: January 29, 2013

Note: Flags indicate national team as defined under FIFA eligibility rules; some limited exceptions apply. Players may hold more than one non-FIFA nationality.

No.	Pos.	Nation	Player
1	GK	CYP	Panos Constantinou
5	DF	CAN	Michael Klukowski
6	DF	BRA	Marcelo Oliveira
7	FW	CRO	Mario Budimir
10	MF	CYP	Constantinos Charalambides (vice-captain)
11	MF	CYP	Nektarios Alexandrou
12	FW	PAR	Aldo Adorno
15	DF	CYP	Marios Antoniades
16	FW	ISR	Dudu Biton (on loan from Standard Liège)
17	MF	CYP	Marinos Satsias (captain)
18	MF	TUN	Selim Benachour
19	DF	CYP	Marios Elia
20	MF	GRE	Alexandros Tziolis (on loan from AS Monaco)

No.	Pos.	Nation	Player
21	MF	BRA	Gustavo Manduca
22	GK	GRE	Dionisis Chiotis
23	MF	POR	Hélio Pinto
25	DF	CYP	Andreas Christofides
26	MF	POR	Nuno Morais
27	DF	ESP	Aritz Borda
28	DF	POR	Mário Sérgio
30	DF	ANG	Francisco Zuela
46	FW	CYP	Efstathios Aloneftis
55	DF	GRE	Christos Karipidis
77	MF	CYP	Athos Solomou
78	GK	ESP	Urko Pardo
88	GK	CYP	Tasos Kissas
90	MF	DEN	Mikkel Beckmann

For recent transfers, see List of Cypriot football transfers summer 2012.
Also, see List of Cypriot football transfers winter 2012–13.

=== Out on loan ===
Note: Flags indicate national team as defined under FIFA eligibility rules; some limited exceptions apply. Players may hold more than one non-FIFA nationality.

No.	Pos.	Nation	Player
—	MF	CYP	Emilios Panayiotou (at Olympiakos Nicosia)

=== International players ===
- (Greece) Alexandros Tziolis
- (Denmark) Mikkel Beckmann
- (Canada) Michael Klukowski
- (Angola) Francisco Zuela

- (Cyprus) Nektarios Alexandrou
- (Cyprus) Efstathios Aloneftis
- (Cyprus) Marios Antoniades
- (Cyprus) Constantinos Charalambides
- (Cyprus) Tasos Kissas
- (Cyprus) Athos Solomou

- (Cyprus) Markos Charalambous (U-21)
- (Cyprus) Andreas Christofides (U-21)

=== Foreign players ===
EU Nationals

- (Greece) (Europe) Dionisis Chiotis
- (Greece) (Europe) Christos Karipidis
- (Greece) (Europe) Alexandros Tziolis
- (Portugal) (Europe) Nuno Morais
- (Portugal) (Cyprus) (Europe) Hélio Pinto
- (Portugal) (Europe) Mário Sérgio
- (Spain) (Belgium) (Europe) Urko Pardo
- (Spain) (Europe) Aritz Borda
- (Croatia) (Europe) Mario Budimir
- (Denmark) (Europe) Mikkel Beckmann

EU Nationals (Dual citizenship)

- (Brazil) (Italy) (Europe) Gustavo Manduca
- (Paraguay) (Spain) (Europe) Aldo Adorno
- (Angola) (Portugal) (Europe) Francisco Zuela
- (Tunisia) (France) (Europe) Selim Benachour
- (Canada) (Poland) (Europe) Michael Klukowski

Non-EU Nationals

- (Brazil) Marcelo Oliveira
- (Israel) Dudu Biton

=== Squad changes ===
In:

No.	Pos.	Nat.	Name	Age	EU	Moving from	Type	Transfer window	Ends	Transfer fee	Source
28	RB	(Portugal)	Mário Sérgio	30	EU	Metalurh Donetsk (Ukraine)	Transfer ✓	Summer	2014	Free	apoelfc.com.cy
30	CB	(Portugal)	Zuela	28	EU	Kuban Krasnodar (Russia)	Transfer ✓	Summer	2014	Free	apoelfc.com.cy
46	LW	(Cyprus)	Aloneftis	29	EU	Omonia Nicosia	Transfer ✓	Summer	2015	Free	apoelfc.com.cy
27	CB	(Spain)	Borda	27	EU	Recreativo (Spain)	Transfer ✓	Summer	2014	€70K	apoelfc.com.cy
18	AM	(Tunisia)	Benachour	30	EU	Marítimo (Portugal)	Transfer ✓	Summer	2014	Free	apoelfc.com.cy
7	CF	(Croatia)	Budimir	26	Non-EU	Ergotelis (Greece)	Transfer ✓	Summer	2014	Free	apoelfc.com.cy
5	LB	(Poland)	Klukowski	31	EU	Manisaspor (Turkey)	Transfer ✓	Summer	2014	Free	apoelfc.com.cy
55	CB	(Greece)	Karipidis	29	EU	Omonia Nicosia	Transfer ✓	Summer	2014	Free	apoelfc.com.cy
20	DM	(Greece)	Tziolis	27	EU	Monaco (France)	Loan →	Summer	2013	Free	apoelfc.com.cy
90	RW	(Denmark)	Beckmann	29	EU	Nordsjælland (Denmark)	Transfer ✓	Winter	2015	€200K	apoelfc.com.cy
16	CF	(Israel)	Biton	24	Non-EU	Standard Liège (Belgium)	Loan →	Winter	2013	Free	apoelfc.com.cy

Total expenditure: ▼€270K

Out:

No.	Pos.	Nat.	Name	Age	EU	Moving to	Type	Transfer window	Transfer fee	Source
3	CB	(Portugal)	Paulo Jorge	31	EU	Anorthosis Famagusta	End of contract ✗	Summer	Free	anorthosis.com
4	CB	(Brazil)	Kaká	31	Non-EU	Hertha BSC (Germany)	Loan return →	Summer	Free	kerkida.net
98	LB	(Brazil)	Boaventura	32	Non-EU	Anorthosis Famagusta	End of contract ✗	Summer	Free	anorthosis.com
81	AM	(Brazil)	Marcinho	31	EU	Levski Sofia (Bulgaria)	End of contract ✗	Summer	Free	levski.bg
7	RB	(Greece)	Poursaitides	35	EU	Retirement	Retirement 🔨	Summer	—	apoel.net
11	RW	(North Macedonia)	Tričkovski	25	Non-EU	Club Brugge (Belgium)	Transfer ✓	Summer	€1.2M	clubbrugge.be
12	AM	(Cyprus)	Panayiotou	19	EU	Olympiakos Nicosia	Loan →	Summer	Free	24sports.com.cy
8	CF	(Brazil)	Aílton	28	Non-EU	Terek Grozny (Russia)	Transfer ✓	Summer	€2.2M	apoelfc.com.cy
9	CF	(Argentina)	Solari	32	EU	Apollon Limassol	Mutual consent ✗	Winter	Free	apoelfc.com.cy
31	DM	(Portugal)	Hélder Sousa	35	EU	Trofense (Portugal)	Mutual consent ✗	Winter	Free	apoelfc.com.cy

Total income: ▲€3.4M

Last updated: January 29, 2013

== Club ==
=== Management ===
Position	Staff
Manager	(Serbia) Ivan Jovanović
Assistant manager/Scout	(Serbia) Predrag Erak
Assistant manager	(Greece) Christos Kontis
Goalkeeping coach	(Serbia) Goran Čumić
Fitness coach	(Cyprus) Giorgos Paraskeva
Team doctor	(Cyprus) Costas Schizas

Last updated: June 19, 2012
Source: apoelfc.com.cy

=== Kit ===
Supplier: Puma
Sponsor(s): MTN

Home	Away	Third

Source: apoelfc.com.cy

=== Other information ===
Chairman	(Cyprus) Phivos Erotokritou
Ground (capacity and dimensions)	GSP Stadium (22,859 / 105x68 m)

Source: apoelfc.com.cy

== Squad stats ==
				Total						Cypriot First Division					Cypriot Cup					UEFA Europa League				
Country	N	P	Name	GS	A	Mins.	Gls.	Y	R	A	Mins.	Gls.	Y	R	A	Mins.	Gls.	Y	R	A	Mins.	Gls.	Y	R
(Cyprus)	1	GK	Constantinou																					
(Canada)	5	LB	Klukowski	18	19	1563	1	4		16	1339		2		2	161	1	2		1	63			
(Brazil)	6	CB	Oliveira	11	13	1003		4		12	1002		4		1	1								
(Croatia)	7	CF	Budimir	14	29	1336	2	3		24	1104	2	2		1	13				4	219		1	
(Brazil)	8	CF	Aílton	2	2	180	1													2	180	1		
(Argentina)	9	CF	Solari	1	4	136	3			3	46				1	90	3							
(Cyprus)	10	RM	Charalambides	25	37	2148	7	3		28	1545	4	2		3	225	3	1		6	378			
(Cyprus)	11	LB	Alexandrou	26	32	2416	4	5		24	1774	3	4		2	102				6	540	1	1	
(Paraguay)	12	RW	Adorno	17	23	1426	15	1		17	1154	13			1	90	1			5	182	1	1	
(Cyprus)	15	LB	Antoniades	7	9	649		2		6	379		1		3	270		1						
(Israel)	16	CF	Biton	7	13	665	6	1		13	665	6	1											
(Cyprus)	17	DM	Satsias		3	25				3	25													
(Tunisia)	18	AM	Benachour	18	28	1593	5	2		19	953	2	1		3	212	1			6	428	2	1	
(Cyprus)	19	RB	Elia	3	3	268		1		2	178		1		1	90								
(Greece)	20	DM	Tziolis	27	33	2492		5		30	2222		5		3	270								
(Brazil)	21	LM	Manduca	38	39	3178	12	2		32	2616	12	2		2	123				5	439			
(Greece)	22	GK	Chiotis	14	14	1244	-13	2	1	5	434	-4	1	1	3	270	-4	1		6	540	-5		
(Portugal)	23	CM	Pinto	31	36	2813	6	4		29	2185	5	3		1	90				6	538	1	1	
(Cyprus)	25	CB	Christofides																					
(Portugal)	26	DM	Morais	34	36	3150	4	7		28	2430	4	7		2	180				6	540			
(Spain)	27	CB	Borda	32	32	2818	2	4	1	24	2098	2	2	1	2	180				6	540		2	
(Portugal)	28	RB	Mário Sérgio	31	32	2796	5	6		24	2126	3	4		2	130	1	1		6	540	1	1	
(Angola)	30	CB	Zuela	9	11	810		2		6	360		1							5	450		1	
(Portugal)	31	AM	Hélder Sousa	3	11	306		2		4	104		1		1	90				6	112		1	
(Cyprus)	32	CF	K. Vasiliou																					
(Cyprus)	33	RW	P. Vasiliou																					
(Cyprus)	40	AM	Charalambous		2	47									1	45				1	2			
(Cyprus)	46	LW	Aloneftis	19	32	1922	5	2		23	1489	4	1		3	186				6	247	1	1	
(Greece)	55	CB	Karipidis	17	18	1465		1		18	1465		1											
(Cyprus)	77	RB	Solomou	12	20	1056		4		16	902		4		3	152				1	2			
(Spain)	78	GK	Pardo	27	27	2430	-14	2	1	27	2430	-14	2	1										
(Cyprus)	88	GK	Kissas		1	16	-1			1	16	-1												
(Denmark)	90	RW	Beckmann	7	12	597	2			12	597	2												

Last updated: May 18, 2013
Source: Match reports in competitive matches, apoelfc.com.cy
Ordered by start team, game starts and position on pitch (from back right to front left)
0 shown as blank
Country: when 2 flags, 1st flag = country that plays for internationally, 2nd flag = country of birth; N = number on jersey; P = Position; Name = Name on jersey (for more extended name, pause the mouse pointer on the name); GS = Game Started; A = Appearances.

=== Top scorers ===
R	Player	Position	League	Cup	Europa League	Total
1	(Paraguay) Adorno	RW	13	1	1	15
2	(Brazil) Manduca	LM	12	0	0	12
3	(Cyprus) Charalambides	RM	4	3	0	7
4	(Israel) Biton	CF	6	0	0	6
4	(Portugal) Hélio Pinto	CM	5	0	1	6
6	(Cyprus) Aloneftis	LW	4	0	1	5
6	(Portugal) Mário Sérgio	RB	3	1	1	5
6	(Tunisia) Benachour	AM	2	1	2	5
9	(Portugal) Morais	DM	4	0	0	4
9	(Cyprus) Alexandrou	LB	3	0	1	4
11	(Argentina) Solari	CF	0	3	0	3
12	(Denmark) Beckmann	RW	2	0	0	2
12	(Spain) Borda	CB	2	0	0	2
12	(Croatia) Budimir	CF	2	0	0	2
15	(Canada) Klukowski	LB	0	1	0	1
15	(Brazil) Aílton	CF	0	0	1	1
Own goals			0	1	0	1
TOTAL			62	11	8	81

Last updated: May 18, 2013
Source: Match reports in Competitive matches, apoelfc.com.cy

=== Captains ===
1. (Cyprus) Marinos Satsias
2. (Cyprus) Constantinos Charalambides
3. (Cyprus) Marios Elia
4. (Portugal) Hélio Pinto

== Pre-season friendlies ==
25-06-2012 Friendly	Blau-Weiss Linz (Austria)	2 – 1	(Cyprus) APOEL	Sportplatz Obertraun, Obertraun
19:00 EET	Guselbauer 20'; Lindner 26'	(Report)	Solomou 75'	Attendance: 150; Referee: (Austria) Andreas Feichtinger

28-06-2012 Friendly	MFK Košice (Slovakia)	0 – 2	(Cyprus) APOEL	Sportplatz Obertraun, Obertraun
17:00 EET		(Report)	Solari 27'; Morais 75'	Attendance: 20; Referee: (Austria) Dieter Muckenhammer

02-07-2012 Friendly	SK Sturm Graz (Austria)	1 – 1	(Cyprus) APOEL	Paltenstadion Rottenmann, Rottenmann
19:30 EET	Kröpfl 31'	(Report)	Mário Sérgio 82'	Attendance: 800; Referee: (Austria) Alexander Harkam

06-07-2012 Friendly	SV Ried (Austria)	2 – 3	(Cyprus) APOEL	Hausruckstadion Ampflwang, Ampflwang
20:00 EET	Hadžić 52' (pen.); Gartler 61'	(Report)	Aílton 28' (pen.), 31'; Alexandrou 81'	Attendance: 1,200; Referee: (Austria) Dieter Muckenhammer

== Mid-season friendlies ==
30-12-2012 Friendly	APOEL (Cyprus)	2 – 1	(Cyprus) PAEEK	Archangelos Training Centre, Nicosia
11:00 EET	Solomou; Aloneftis	(Report)	Goal	Attendance: Behind closed doors

21-02-2013 Friendly	APOEL (Cyprus)	2 – 0	Cyprus U21	Archangelos Training Centre, Nicosia
11:00 EET	Beckmann 79' (pen.); P. Vasiliou 80'	(Report)		Attendance: Behind closed doors

== Competitions ==
=== Overall ===
Competition	Started round	Final position / round	First match	Last match
Cypriot First Division	—	Winners	3 September 2012	18 May 2013
UEFA Europa League	2nd qualifying	Play-off round	19 July 2012	30 August 2012
Cypriot Cup	1st round	2nd round	31 October 2012	23 January 2013

Updated to match played 18 May 2013
Source: Competitions

=== Cypriot First Division ===
==== Classification ====
Pos	Team	Pld	W	D	L	GF	GA	GD	Pts	Qualification or relegation
1	APOEL	26	21	3	2	56	10	+46	66	Qualification for second round, Group A
2	Anorthosis Famagusta	26	18	6	2	57	21	+36	60	Qualification for second round, Group A
3	AEK Larnaca	26	17	4	5	50	21	+29	55	Qualification for second round, Group A
4	Omonia Nicosia	26	16	5	5	51	22	+29	53	Qualification for second round, Group A
5	AEL Limassol	26	14	9	3	46	26	+20	51	Qualification for second round, Group B

Source: CFA
Rules for classification: 1) points; 2) head-to-head points; 3) head-to-head goal difference; 4) head-to-head away goals scored; 5) goal difference; 6) number of goals scored

==== Results summary ====
Overall								Home						Away					
Pld	W	D	L	GF	GA	GD	Pts	W	D	L	GF	GA	GD	W	D	L	GF	GA	GD
32	23	4	5	62	19	+43	73	10	3	3	31	11	+20	13	1	2	31	8	+23

Last updated: May 18, 2013.
Source: UEFA

==== Results by round ====
Round	1	2	3	4	5	6	7	8	9	10	11	12	13	14	15	16	17	18	19	20	21	22	23	24	25	26	27	28	29	30	31	32
Ground	A	H	A	H	A	H	A	H	A	H	A	A	H	H	A	H	A	H	A	H	A	H	A	H	H	A	A	H	A	H	H	A
Result	W	W	W	W	D	W	W	W	W	L	W	W	L	W	W	D	W	D	W	W	W	W	W	W	W	W	L	D	W	L	W	L
Position	1	1	1	1	2	1	1	1	1	3	2	2	2	2	2	2	2	2	2	2	2	2	2	1	1	1	1	1	1	1	1	1

Updated to match(es) played on May 18, 2013. Source: apoelfc.com.cy
A = Away; H = Home; W = Win; D = Draw; L = Loss

=== Play-offs table ===
The first 12 teams are divided into 3 groups. Points are carried over from the regular season.

==== Group A ====
Pos	Team	Pld	W	D	L	GF	GA	GD	Pts	Qualification
1	APOEL (C)	32	23	4	5	62	19	+43	73	Qualification for Champions League third qualifying round
2	Anorthosis Famagusta	32	20	8	4	60	29	+31	68	Qualification for Europa League second qualifying round
3	Omonia Nicosia	32	20	6	6	66	27	+39	66	Qualification for Europa League second qualifying round
4	AEK Larnaca	32	19	4	9	55	28	+27	61	

Source: UEFA
Rules for classification: 1) points; 2) head-to-head points; 3) head-to-head goal difference; 4) head-to-head goals scored; 5) goal difference; 6) number of goals scored.
(C) Champions

=== Matches ===
Kick-off times are in EET.

==== Regular season ====
03-09-2012 Matchweek 1	Enosis	0 – 5	APOEL	Tasos Markou Stadium, Paralimni
19:00 EET		(Report)	Adorno 10', 28', 72'; Manduca 44' (pen.); Charalambides 64'	Attendance: 2,058; Referee: Marios Panayi

16-09-2012 Matchweek 2	APOEL	3 – 1	Doxa Katokopias	GSP Stadium, Nicosia
19:00 EET	Adorno 53', 62'; Aloneftis 85'	(Report)	Fernandes 90+2'	Attendance: Behind closed doors Referee: Ioannis Anastasiou

22-09-2012 Matchweek 3	Alki Larnaca	1 – 3	APOEL	GSZ Stadium, Larnaca
20:00 EET	Vasconcelos 70'	(Report)	Budimir 1'; Manduca 50'; Adorno 60'	Attendance: 2,497; Referee: Marios Tsaggaris

30-09-2012 Matchweek 4	APOEL	1 – 0	Apollon	GSP Stadium, Nicosia
18:00 EET	Adorno 79'	(Report)		Attendance: 10,690; Referee: Leontios Trattos

07-10-2012 Matchweek 5	Omonia	0 – 0	APOEL	GSP Stadium, Nicosia
18:00 EET		(Report)		Attendance: 14,011; Referee: Demetris Chrysostomou

22-10-2012 Matchweek 6	APOEL	4 – 0	Olympiakos	GSP Stadium, Nicosia
19:00 EET	Morais 21', 81'; Adorno 63'; Manduca 68' (pen.)	(Report)		Attendance: 7,074; Referee: Vasilis Demetriou

27-10-2012 Matchweek 7	Nea Salamina	0 – 3	APOEL	Ammochostos Stadium, Larnaca
19:00 EET		(Report)	Pinto 28'; Aloneftis 73', 77'	Attendance: 2,020; Referee: Marios Tsaggaris

05-11-2012 Matchweek 8	APOEL	4 – 1	Ayia Napa	GSP Stadium, Nicosia
19:00 EET	Adorno 8', 24', 33'; Manduca 45' (pen.)	(Report)	Klukowski 90' (o.g.)	Attendance: 6,333; Referee: Avraam Tsoukkas

11-11-2012 Matchweek 9	Ethnikos Achna	0 – 1	APOEL	Dasaki Stadium, Achna
18:00 EET		(Report)	Borda 23'	Attendance: 1,785; Referee: Thomas Mouskos

18-11-2012 Matchweek 10	APOEL	1 – 2	AEK Larnaca	GSP Stadium, Nicosia
18:00 EET	Pinto 54'	(Report)	Serrán 23'; Demetriou 79'	Attendance: 9,652; Referee: Christos Nicolaides

26-11-2012 Matchweek 11	AEL Limassol	1 – 3	APOEL	Tsirion Stadium, Limassol
19:00 EET	Bebê 14'	(Report)	Pinto 4'; Manduca 23' (pen.); Borda (red card) 64'; Charalambides 81'	Attendance: 7,774; Referee: Kostas Psevdiotis

02-12-2012 Matchweek 12	AEP Paphos	0 – 2	APOEL	Pafiako Stadium, Paphos
18:00 EET		(Report)	Manduca 38' (pen.); Benachour 90+3'	Attendance: 3,063; Referee: Leontios Trattos

08-12-2012 Matchweek 13	APOEL	0 – 1	Anorthosis	GSP Stadium, Nicosia
14:30 EET		(Report)	Rezek 9'	Attendance: 12,368; Referee: Ioannis Anastasiou

15-12-2012 Matchweek 14	APOEL	1 – 0	Enosis	GSP Stadium, Nicosia
18:00 EET	Adorno 76'	(Report)		Attendance: 6,046; Referee: Antonis Christodoulou

21-12-2012 Matchweek 15	Doxa Katokopias	0 – 3	APOEL	Ammochostos Stadium, Larnaca
18:00 EET	Pereira (red card) 38'	(Report)	Manduca 26', 29'; Adorno 72'	Attendance: 1,654; Referee: Demetris Masias

06-01-2013 Matchweek 16	APOEL	1 – 1	Alki Larnaca	GSP Stadium, Nicosia
18:00 EET	Mário Sérgio 90'	(Report)	Cafú 72'	Attendance: 5,527; Referee: Demetris Chrysostomou

14-01-2013 Matchweek 17	Apollon	1 – 2	APOEL	Tsirion Stadium, Limassol
19:00 EET	Merkis 24'; Markovski (red card) 70'	(Report)	Benachour 52'; Pinto 90+12'	Attendance: 4,824; Referee: Leontios Trattos

19-01-2013 Matchweek 18	APOEL	1 – 1	Omonia	GSP Stadium, Nicosia
14:30 EET	Pinto 15'	(Report)	Alabi 60'; Margaça (red card) 78'	Attendance: 15,727; Referee: Vasilis Demetriou

27-01-2013 Matchweek 19	Olympiakos	0 – 2	APOEL	GSP Stadium, Nicosia
18:00 EET		(Report)	Manduca 58', 71'	Attendance: 3,298; Referee: Marios Nicolaou

02-02-2013 Matchweek 20	APOEL	2 – 0	Nea Salamina	GSP Stadium, Nicosia
18:00 EET	Alexandrou 35'; Biton 90'	(Report)		Attendance: Behind closed doors Referee: Demetris Masias

11-02-2013 Matchweek 21	Ayia Napa	0 – 2	APOEL	Tasos Markou Stadium, Paralimni
19:00 EET		(Report)	Borda 38'; Biton 85'	Attendance: 1,000; Referee: Thomas Mouskos

27-02-2013 Matchweek 22	APOEL	1 – 0	Ethnikos Achna	GSP Stadium, Nicosia
18:00 EET	Biton 49'	(Report)		Attendance: Behind closed doors Referee: Costas Psevdiotis

03-03-2013 Matchweek 23	AEK Larnaca	0 – 1	APOEL	GSZ Stadium, Larnaca
18:00 EET		(Report)	Beckmann 75'; Urko Pardo (red card) 90+3'	Attendance: 4,515; Referee: Ioannis Anastasiou

09-03-2013 Matchweek 24	APOEL	2 – 0	AEL Limassol	GSP Stadium, Nicosia
16:00 EET	Alexandrou 51', 71'	(Report)	Ouon (red card) 74'	Attendance: 10,052; Referee: Demetris Chrysostomou

17-03-2013 Matchweek 25	APOEL	6 – 0	AEP Paphos	GSP Stadium, Nicosia
18:00 EET	Mário Sérgio 15'; Beckmann 22'; Biton 32', 46'; Charalambides 55', 88'	(Report)		Attendance: 5,982; Referee: Avraam Tsoukkas

31-03-2013 Matchweek 26	Anorthosis	0 – 2	APOEL	Antonis Papadopoulos Stadium, Larnaca
16:00 EET		(Report)	Biton 68'; Morais 80'	Attendance: 7,338; Referee: Leontios Trattos

==== Play-offs ====
06-04-2013 Matchweek 1	Omonia	3 – 0	APOEL	GSP Stadium, Nicosia
16:30 EET	Efrem 14', 65'; Leandro 54'	(Report)		Attendance: 13,433; Referee: Christos Nicolaides

13-04-2013 Matchweek 2	APOEL	0 – 0	Anorthosis	GSP Stadium, Nicosia
16:30 EET		(Report)	Rui Duarte (yellow card) 81' (yellow-red card)	Attendance: 10,733; Referee: Leontios Trattos

21-04-2013 Matchweek 3	AEK Larnaca	0 – 1	APOEL	GSZ Stadium, Larnaca
17:00 EET		(Report)	Mário Sérgio 63'	Attendance: 2,528; Referee: Marios Tsaggaris

27-04-2013 Matchweek 4	APOEL	0 – 1	AEK Larnaca	GSP Stadium, Nicosia
17:00 EET		(Report)	Alexandre 78'	Attendance: 10,676; Referee: Ioannis Anastasiou

12-05-2013 Matchweek 5	APOEL	4 – 3	Omonia	GSP Stadium, Nicosia
18:00 EET	Aloneftis 1'; Budimir 60'; Morais 71'; Manduca 83' (pen.)	(Report)	Karipidis 19' (o.g.); Christofi 54'; Alves 74'	Attendance: 13,702; Referee: Vasilis Demetriou

18-05-2013 Matchweek 6	Anorthosis	2 – 1	APOEL	Antonis Papadopoulos Stadium, Larnaca
17:00 EET	Yitzhaki 6', 74'; Galamaz (red card) 84'	(Report)	Chiotis (red card) 73'; Manduca 85' (pen.)	Attendance: 966; Referee: Demetris Masias

=== UEFA Europa League ===
==== Qualifying phase ====
===== Second qualifying round =====
19-07-2012 First Leg	APOEL (Cyprus)	2 – 0	(Slovakia) FK Senica	GSP Stadium, Nicosia
19:00 CET	Aílton 33'; Alexandrou 40'	(Report 1) (Report 2)		Attendance: 16,323; Referee: (Poland) Pawel Gil

26-07-2012 Second Leg	FK Senica (Slovakia)	0 – 1 (0 – 3 agg.)	(Cyprus) APOEL	Štadión FK Senica, Senica
19:30 CET		(Report 1) (Report 2)	Pinto 73'	Attendance: 3,069; Referee: (Romania) Alexandru Dan Tudor

===== Third qualifying round =====
02-08-2012 First Leg	APOEL (Cyprus)	2 – 1	(Norway) Aalesund	GSP Stadium, Nicosia
19:00 CET	Mário Sérgio 34'; Aloneftis 80'	(Report 1) (Report 2)	Stewart 16'	Attendance: 16,708; Referee: (Bosnia and Herzegovina) Emir Alecković

09-08-2012 Second Leg	Aalesund (Norway)	0 – 1 (1 – 3 agg.)	(Cyprus) APOEL	Color Line Stadion, Ålesund
19:00 CET		(Report 1) (Report 2)	Adorno 36'	Attendance: 5,057; Referee: (Estonia) Hannes Kaasik

===== Play-off round =====
23-08-2012 First Leg	Neftchi Baku (Azerbaijan)	1 – 1	(Cyprus) APOEL	Dalga Arena, Baku
18:00 CET	Shukurov 82' (pen.)	(Report 1) (Report 2)	Benachour 83'	Attendance: 4,500; Referee: (Poland) Robert Malek

30-08-2012 Second Leg	APOEL (Cyprus)	1 – 3 (2 – 4 agg.)	(Azerbaijan) Neftchi Baku	GSP Stadium, Nicosia
19:00 CET	Benachour 44'	(Report 1) (Report 2)	Sadigov 22'; Wobay 30'; Flavinho 60'; Yunuszade (red card) 83'	Attendance: 20,337; Referee: (France) Said Ennjimi

=== Cypriot Cup ===
==== First round ====
31-10-2012 Knock-out	APOEL	8 – 1	Chalkanoras	GSP Stadium, Nicosia
18:00 EET	Solari 5', 29', 56'; Benachour 6'; Charalambides 7', 17', 27'; Mário Sérgio 65'	(Report)	Antoniou 85'	Attendance: 2,917; Referee: Marios Stamatis

==== Second round ====
09-01-2013 First Leg	AEL Limassol	0 – 2	APOEL	Tsirion Stadium, Limassol
16:00 EET	Rui Miguel (red card) 84'	(Report)	Klukowski 48'; Edmar 71' (o.g.)	Attendance: 5,020; Referee: Vasilis Demetriou

23-01-2013 Second Leg	APOEL	1 – 3 (3 – 3a agg.)	AEL Limassol	GSP Stadium, Nicosia
18:00 EET	Adorno 2'	(Report)	Vouho 12' (pen.), 64', (yellow card) 68' (yellow-red card); Monteiro 40'	Attendance: 7,000; Referee: Antonis Christodoulou
