= 2012–13 Cypriot Cup =

Tournament details
- Country: Cyprus
- Dates: 31 October 2012 – 22 May 2013
- Teams: 28

Final positions
- Champions: Apollon (7th title)
- Runners-up: AEL

Tournament statistics
- Matches played: 41
- Goals scored: 114 (2.78 per match)

The 2012–13 Cypriot Cup was the 71st edition of the Cypriot Cup. A total of 28 clubs entered the competition. It began on 31 October 2012 with the first round and concluded on 22 May 2013 with the final which was held at Tsirion Stadium. Apollon Limassol won their 7th Cypriot Cup trophy after beating AEL Limassol 2–1 (aet) in the final.

== Format ==
In the 2012–13 Cypriot Cup, participated all the teams of the Cypriot First Division and the Cypriot Second Division. Teams from the two lower divisions (Third and Fourth) competed in a separate cup competition.

The competition consisted of five rounds. In the first round each tie was played as a single leg and was held at the home ground of one of the two teams, according to the draw results. Each tie winner was qualifying to the next round. If a match was drawn, extra time was following. If extra time was drawn, there was a replay at the ground of the team who were away for the first game. If the rematch was also drawn, then extra time was following and if the match remained drawn after extra time the winner was decided by penalty shoot-out.

The next three rounds were played in a two-legged format, each team playing a home and an away match against their opponent. The team which scored more goals on aggregate, was qualifying to the next round. If the two teams scored the same number of goals on aggregate, then the team which scored more goals away from home was advancing to the next round.

If both teams had scored the same number of home and away goals, then extra time was following after the end of the second leg match. If during the extra thirty minutes both teams had managed to score, but they had scored the same number of goals, then the team who scored the away goals was advancing to the next round (i.e. the team which was playing away). If there weren't scored any goals during extra time, the qualifying team was determined by penalty shoot-out.

The final was a single match.

The cup winner secured a place in the 2013–14 UEFA Europa League.

== Bracket ==
Second Round
1	Ethnikos Achna	0	0	0
16	Omonia	2	2	4
8	Anorthosis (a.e.t.)	1	2	3
9	Alki Larnaca	1	1	2
5	AEP Paphos	2	4	6
12	PAEEK	2	1	3
4	AEL Limassol (a)	0	3	3
13	APOEL	2	1	3
6	Ayia Napa	0	3	3
11	Anagennisi Deryneia	1	0	1
3	Nea Salamina	0	0	0
14	Apollon Limassol	1	1	2
7	Ermis Aradippou	0	0	0
10	Enosis Neon Paralimni	1	0	1
2	AEK Larnaca	1	3	4
15	Olympiakos Nicosia	0	3	3

Quarter-finals
Omonia	4	2	6
Anorthosis	0	0	0
AEP Paphos	1	0	1
AEL Limassol	4	3	7
Ayia Napa	0	1	1
Apollon Limassol	2	1	3
Enosis Neon Paralimni	1	0	1
AEK Larnaca	1	2	3

Semi-finals
Omonia	0	0	0
AEL Limassol	0	1	1
Apollon Limassol	2	1	3
AEK Larnaca	0	1	1

Final
AEL Limassol	1
Apollon Limassol (a.e.t.)	2

== First round ==
The draw was made on 18 October 2012, with ties played on 31 October 2012, 7 and 21 November 2012.

31 October 2012	Alki	6–0	Akritas	GSZ Stadium, Larnaca
14:00 EET	Beckel 27', 70'; Cirillo 55', 67'; Cafú 72', 86'	(Report)		Attendance: 100; Referee: Andreas Orthodoxou

31 October 2012	Ethnikos Assia	0–4	Enosis Neon Paralimni	Makario Stadium, Nicosia
14:00 EET		(Report)	Okoduwa 15', 72' da Costa 43' (pen.); Krljanović 83'	Attendance: 17; Referee: Christos Christou

31 October 2012	AEZ	0–2	Olympiakos	Zakaki Stadium, Zakaki
14:00 EET		(Report)	Michael 13', 51'	Attendance: 150; Referee: Christos Nicolaides

31 October 2012	AEK Kouklia	2–3 (a.e.t.)	Ethnikos Achna	Kouklia Stadium, Kouklia
14:00 EET	Pantos 41'; Solomou 78'	(Report)	Penta 57'; Paixão 90'; Simov 120'	Attendance: 100; Referee: Avraam Tsoukkas

31 October 2012	Onisilos	0–2	Anorthosis	Sotira Stadium, Sotira
14:00 EET		(Report)	Jula 12', 46'	Attendance: 600; Referee: Antonis Christodoulou

31 October 2012	Doxa	0–1	Anagennisi	Ammochostos Stadium, Larnaca
14:00 EET		(Report)	Felix 1'	Attendance: 3 Referee: Loukas Soteriou

31 October 2012	Othellos	1–2	Nea Salamina	Othellos Stadium, Athienou
14:00 EET	Graszl 67' (o.g.)	(Report)	Moreira 48'; Lambropoulos 60'	Attendance: 60; Referee: Costas Nicolaou

31 October 2012	Omonia Aradippou	0–3	AEK Larnaca	Aradippou Stadium, Aradippou
14:00 EET		(Report)	Daemen 47', 81', 90'	Attendance: 300; Referee: Loizos Panayiotou

31 October 2012	Apollon	5–0	APEP	Tsirion Stadium, Limassol
17:00 EET	Roberto 12'; Markovski 20'; Dady 22'; Theodoridis 27', 56'	(Report)		Attendance: 942; Referee: Iakovos Tokkaris

31 October 2012	APOEL	8–1	Chalkanoras	GSP Stadium, Nicosia
18:00 EET	Solari 5', 29', 56'; Benachour 6'; Charalambides 7', 17', 27'; Mário Sérgio 65'	(Report)	Antoniou 85'	Attendance: 2,917; Referee: Marios Stamatis

7 November 2012	Aris Limassol	1–3 (a.e.t.)	AEP Paphos	Tsirion Stadium, Limassol
14:00 EET	Theofanous 82'	(Report)	Aguinaldo 24', 114'; Saulo 98'	Attendance: 150; Referee: Georgios Nicolaou

21 November 2012	Ayia Napa	2–0	Nikos & Sokratis Erimis	Tasos Markou, Paralimni
14:00 EET	Afonso 41'; Lazić 84'	(Report)		Attendance: 50; Referee: Marios Ioannou

== Second round ==
The first legs played on 9 and 23 January 2013. The second legs played on 16, 23 and 30 January 2013.

The following four teams advanced directly to second round, meeting the twelve winners of first round ties:

- Omonia (2011–12 Cypriot Cup winner)
- AEL Limassol (2011–12 Cypriot Cup finalist)
- Ermis Aradippou (2011–12 Cypriot First Division Fair Play winner)
- PAEEK (2011–12 Cypriot Second Division Fair Play winner)

Team 1	Agg.	Team 2	1st leg	2nd leg
Ethnikos Achna	0–4	Omonia	0–2	0–2
Ayia Napa	3–1	Anagennisi Deryneia	0–1	3–0
Ermis Aradippou	0–1	Enosis Neon Paralimni	0–1	0–0
AEP Paphos	6–3	PAEEK	2–2	4–1
Anorthosis	3–2	Alki Larnaca	1–1	2–1 (a.e.t.)
AEL Limassol	3–3 (a)	APOEL	0–2	3–1
AEK Larnaca	4–3	Olympiakos Nicosia	1–0	3–3
Nea Salamina	0–2	Apollon Limassol	0–1	0–1

== Quarter-finals ==
The first legs played on 13, 20 February 2013 and on 6 March 2013. The second legs played on 6 and 13 March 2013.

Team 1	Agg.	Team 2	1st leg	2nd leg
Ayia Napa	1–3	Apollon Limassol	0–2	1–1
Enosis Neon Paralimni	1–3	AEK Larnaca	1–1	0–2
Omonia	6–0	Anorthosis	4–0	2–0
AEP Paphos	1–7	AEL Limassol	1–4	0–3

== Semi-finals ==
The first legs played on 10 April 2013. The second legs played on 17 April 2013.

Team 1	Agg.	Team 2	1st leg	2nd leg
Omonia	0–1	AEL Limassol	0–0	0–1
Apollon Limassol	3–1	AEK Larnaca	2–0	1–1

=== First leg ===
10 April 2013
17:00 EEST

Omonia	0–0	AEL Limassol
	Report

GSP Stadium, Nicosia
Attendance: 10,700
Referee: Marios Panayi

10 April 2013
19:00 EEST

Apollon Limassol	2–0	AEK Larnaca
Papoulis 17'; Konstantinou 75'	Report

Tsirion Stadium, Limassol
Attendance: 4,093
Referee: Marios Tsaggaris

=== Second leg ===
17 April 2013
17:00 EEST

AEL Limassol	1–0	Omonia
Vouho 45'	Report

Tsirion Stadium, Limassol
Attendance: 9,432
Referee: Vasilis Demetriou

17 April 2013
19:00 EEST

AEK Larnaca	1–1	Apollon Limassol
Alexandre 29'	Report	Surdu 64'

GSZ Stadium, Larnaca
Attendance: 5,000
Referee: Marios Panayi

== Final ==
22 May 2013
19:00 EEST

AEL Limassol	1–2 (a.e.t.)	Apollon Limassol
Maykon (yellow card) 70'; Monteiro (yellow card) 76'; Vouho (pen.) (penalty missed) 83'; Ouon (yellow card) 100'; Vouho 135'	Report	García (yellow card) 78'; Cardozo 95'; Vale (yellow card) 115'; Surdu 118' (pen.)

Tsirion Stadium, Limassol
Attendance: 13,000
Referee: (Slovenia) Damir Skomina

AEL Limassol	Apollon Limassol

Cypriot Cup 2012–13 Winners
Apollon Limassol
7th Title

== See also ==
- Cypriot Cup
- 2012–13 Cypriot First Division
- 2012–13 Cypriot Second Division

== Sources ==
- Official website
- "2012/13 Cyprus Cup". Rec.Sport.Soccer Statistics Foundation. 14 January 2016.
- Papamoiseos, Stelios (2013). Από την ενοποίηση... στα αστέρια [From unification... to the stars] (in Greek). Nicosia: The writer. pp. 166–167.
