= Jorge Tavares =

Jorge Tavares may refer to:

- Jorge Tavares (footballer, born 1905), Portuguese footballer
- Jorge Tavares (footballer, born 1986), Portuguese footballer
