= Aritz Borda =

Spanish footballer (born 1985)

Personal information
- Full name: Aritz Borda Etxezarreta
- Date of birth: 3 January 1985 (age 41)
- Place of birth: Lasarte-Oria, Spain
- Height: 1.89 m (6 ft 2 in)
- Position: Centre-back

Youth career
- Lizeo Santo Tomás

Senior career*
Years	Team	Apps	(Gls)
2003–2008	Real Sociedad B	59	(3)
2003–2004	→ UPV (loan)		
2007–2008	→ Real Unión (loan)	17	(1)
2008–2010	Bilbao Athletic	56	(6)
2010–2011	Mirandés	32	(1)
2011–2012	Recreativo	24	(2)
2012–2014	APOEL	35	(2)
2014–2015	Muangthong United	11	(1)
2015	Rapid București	7	(0)
2015–2016	Alavés	10	(0)
2016–2017	Western Sydney Wanderers	14	(1)
2017–2019	Burgos	62	(1)
2019–2021	Real Unión	19	(0)
- * Club domestic league appearances and goals

Aritz Borda Etxezarreta (born 3 January 1985) is a Spanish former professional footballer who played as a central defender.

== Club career ==
Born in Lasarte-Oria, Gipuzkoa, Borda spent his first seven seasons as a senior in the Segunda División B, competing exclusively in his native Basque Country with the exception of CD Mirandés, which he represented in 2010–11, starting in all the league matches he appeared in for the Castile and León side as they fell short in the promotion playoffs.

Borda joined Recreativo de Huelva of Segunda División for 2011–12 campaign. He made his official debut with the Andalusians on 7 September 2011, in a 0–2 home loss against Elche CF in the second round of the Copa del Rey. His league debut arrived on 22 October, as he again played the full 90 minutes in a 2–1 defeat at AD Alcorcón. He scored his first goal as a professional on 13 November, helping to a 4–2 home win over UD Las Palmas.

On 14 June 2012, aged 27, Borda moved abroad for the first time and signed a two-year contract with Cypriot club APOEL FC. He scored his first goal for his new team on 11 November, the game's only at Ethnikos Achna FC, and won the First Division in his first season for the first major accolade of his career.

During 2013–14, Borda made five appearances in the group stage of the UEFA Europa League, and helped to a treble conquest of league, Cup and Super Cup. After leaving in June 2014, he went on to play with Thai Premier League's Muangthong United F.C. for a few months.

Borda switched clubs and countries again on 4 February 2015, joining FC Rapid București from the Romanian Liga I. On 13 July he returned to his native country, after agreeing to a one-year deal with Deportivo Alavés.

On 5 July 2016, Borda signed a two-year contract with Australian club Western Sydney Wanderers FC. On 29 July 2017 he left by mutual consent, after an extremely poor start to the season which saw him give away penalties and be sent off twice, being subsequently dropped from the squad.

== Style of play ==
Borda was described as a central defender with a very good aerial game. He was strong in the challenge and was a good passer of the ball with both feet; additionally, he was proficient in build up play and had the ability to score goals from set pieces in attack.

== Club statistics ==
As of match played 8 November 2020

Club	Season	League			National Cup		League Cup		Continental		Other (Note: Includes Cypriot Super Cup and promotion to La Liga play-offs matches.)		Total	
Club	Season	Division	Apps	Goals	Apps	Goals	Apps	Goals	Apps	Goals	Apps	Goals	Apps	Goals
Real Sociedad B	2004–05	Segunda División B	5	0	—		—		—		—		5	0
Real Sociedad B	2005–06	Segunda División B	28	0	—		—		—		1	0	29	0
Real Sociedad B	2006–07	Segunda División B	26	3	—		—		—		—		26	3
Real Sociedad B	Total		59	3	—		—		—		1	0	60	3
Real Unión	2007–08	Segunda División B	17	1	3	0	—		—		—		20	1
Bilbao Athletic	2008–09	Segunda División B	24	3	—		—		—		—		24	3
Bilbao Athletic	2009–10	Segunda División B	32	3	—		—		—		—		32	3
Bilbao Athletic	Total		56	6	—		—		—		—		56	6
Athletic Bilbao	2009–10	La Liga	0	0	0	0	—		—		—		0	0
Mirandés	2010–11	Segunda División B	31	1	—		—		—		1	0	32	1
Recreativo	2011–12	Segunda División	24	1	1	0	—		—		—		25	1
APOEL	2012–13	Cypriot First Division	24	2	2	0	—		6	0	—		32	2
APOEL	2013–14	Cypriot First Division	11	0	4	0	—		5	0	0	0	20	0
APOEL	Total		35	2	6	0	—		11	0	0	0	52	2
Muangthong United	2014	Thai Premier League	11	1	0	0	—		—		—		11	1
Rapid Bucuresti	2014–15	Liga I	7	0	0	0	—		—		—		7	0
Alavés	2015–16	Segunda División	10	0	1	0	—		—		—		11	0
Western Sydney Wanderers	2016–17	A-League	14	1	1	0	—		—		—		15	1
Burgos	2017–18	Segunda División B	30	0	0	0	—		—		—		30	0
Burgos	2018–19	Segunda División B	32	1	0	0	—		—		—		32	1
Burgos	Total		62	1	0	0	—		0	0	0	0	62	1
Real Unión	2019–20	Segunda División B	16	0	0	0	—		—		—		16	0
Real Unión	2020–21	Segunda División B	2	0	0	0	—		—		—		2	0
Real Unión	Total		18	0	6	0	—		0	0	0	0	18	0
Career total			344	17	12	0	—		11	0	2	0	369	17

== Honours ==
APOEL

- Cypriot First Division: 2012–13, 2013–14
- Cypriot Cup: 2013–14
- Cypriot Super Cup: 2013

Alavés

- Segunda División: 2015–16
