= Athos Solomou =

Cypriot footballer

Personal information
- Full name: Athos Solomou
- Date of birth: 30 November 1985 (age 40)
- Place of birth: Limassol, Cyprus
- Height: 1.82 m (6 ft 0 in)
- Positions: Right winger; right back

Team information
- Current team: Haringey Borough

Youth career
- Apollon Limassol

Senior career*
Years	Team	Apps	(Gls)
2002–2009	Apollon Limassol	98	(8)
2009–2014	APOEL	62	(3)
2014	Enosis Neon Paralimni	5	(0)
2015	Oțelul Galați	16	(0)
2015–2016	Doxa Katokopias	15	(0)
2016	Rah Ahan	4	(0)
2016	AEZ Zakakiou	4	(0)
2017–2018	FC International Limassol		
2018	Digenis Oroklinis	0	(0)
2018–2019	Ethnikos Assia	22	(3)
2019	Elpida Astromeriti	0	(0)
2019–	Haringey Borough	27	(6)

International career^{‡}
2007–	Cyprus	13	(0)
- * Club domestic league appearances and goals as of 19:46, 21 April 2020 (UTC) ‡ National team caps and goals as of 13 March 2013

Athos Solomou (Greek: Άθως Σολωμού; born 30 November 1985) is a Cypriot professional footballer who plays for Haringey Borough in the Isthmian League Premier Division. He is mainly a right winger but he also plays as right back also.

== Club career ==
=== Apollon Limassol ===
Solomou started his career from Apollon Limassol's Academy. He made his debut with Apollon on season 2002–03. He stayed in Apollon for 7 years and he won one Cypriot Championship and one Cypriot Super Cup with the team.

=== APOEL ===
On 10 September 2009 Solomou signed a three-years contract with APOEL and the next season he helped APOEL to win the 2010–11 Cypriot First Division. He also appeared in three 2011–12 UEFA Champions League matches for APOEL, in the club's surprising run to the quarter-finals of the competition. At the end of the 2012–13 season, he became champion again with APOEL, after winning the 2012–13 Cypriot First Division.

During the 2013–14 season, he appeared in three 2013–14 UEFA Europa League group stage matches for APOEL and won all the titles in Cyprus, the Cypriot League, the Cypriot Cup and the Cypriot Super Cup.

On 2 June 2014, APOEL announced that it would not renew the contract with the player and after five successful years, Solomou left the club.

=== Rah Ahan ===
On 20 January 2016, Solomou joined Persian Gulf League side Rah Ahan on a 6-month contract for an undisclosed fee.

=== Later career ===
Solomou joined AEZ Zakakiou for the 2016–17 season, but made only four appearances. In the 2017–18 season, he played for FC International Limassol in the fifth tier. He joined Digenis Oroklinis in the Cypriot Second Division in the 2018–19 season, but did not play any games and dropped down a division to play for Ethnikos Assia. After briefly joining Elpida Astromeriti in June 2019, Solomou moved to England and joined Haringey Borough for the 2019–20 season.

== Honours ==
Apollon Limassol

- Cypriot First Division (1) : 2005–06
- Cypriot Super Cup (1) : 2006

APOEL

- Cypriot First Division (3) : 2010–11, 2012–13, 2013–14
- Cypriot Cup (1) : 2013–14
- Cypriot Super Cup (2) : 2011, 2013
