= Panos Constantinou =

Cypriot footballer (born 1985)

Personal information
- Full name: Panos Constantinou
- Date of birth: November 1, 1985 (age 41)
- Place of birth: Limassol, Cyprus
- Height: 1.80 m (5 ft 11 in)
- Position: Goalkeeper

Senior career*
Years	Team	Apps	(Gls)
2005–2009	AEL Limassol	45	(0)
2010–2013	APOEL	1	(0)
2013–2015	Aris Limassol	27	(0)
2015–2016	Apollon Kalamarias	26	(0)
2016–2017	Pafos	13	(0)
Total		112	(0)

International career
2014–2015	Cyprus	1	(0)
- * Club domestic league appearances and goals as of 24 July 2017

Panos Constantinou (Greek: Πάνος Κωνσταντίνου; born November 1, 1985) is a retired Cypriot goalkeeper.

== Career ==
=== AEL Limassol ===
Panos is a product of AEL's youth academies. He became a regular member of AEL in the 2007–2008 season and performed well. In the 2008–2009 season it looked like he was going to be second choice goalkeeper, after the signing of highly cited goalkeeper Pierre Ebede. However, after some very poor performances by Ebede, Constantinou was handed the starting position. So, he had established himself as the first-choice goalkeeper for AEL Limassol, despite his young age. He made some great saves and since he was in a very good form, it was expected by the media and fans to receive a national call-up, but this never happened. His exceptional form during the 2008–2009 season earned him a new 1-year contract with AEL Limassol which he signed on 24 March 2008, and stayed to the club until the summer of 2010.

=== APOEL ===
On May 29, 2010, he signed a one-year contract with APOEL. With APOEL he won the 2010–11 Cypriot First Division (appearing in only one match) and became a champion for the first time in his career. Two years later, he became champion again with APOEL, after winning the 2012–13 Cypriot First Division, although he didn't appear in any single match that season.

== Honours ==
APOEL

- Cypriot First Division: 2

2010–11, 2012–13

- Cypriot Super Cup: 1

2011
