= 2013–14 Cypriot Cup =

Tournament details
- Country: Cyprus
- Dates: 23 October 2013 – 21 May 2014
- Teams: 30

Final positions
- Champions: APOEL (20th title)
- Runners-up: Ermis

Tournament statistics
- Matches played: 43
- Goals scored: 129 (3 per match)
- Top goal scorer(s): Constantinos Charalambides (4 goals); Cillian Sheridan (4 goals); Leandro (4 goals)

The 2013–14 Cypriot Cup was the 72nd edition of the Cypriot Cup. A total of 30 clubs entered the competition. It began on 23 October 2013 with the first round and concluded on 21 May 2014 with the final which was held at GSP Stadium. APOEL won their 20th Cypriot Cup trophy after beating Ermis Aradippou 2–0 in the final.

== Format ==
In the 2013–14 Cypriot Cup, participated all the teams of the Cypriot First Division and the Cypriot Second Division (Divisions B1 and B2). Teams from the two lower divisions (Third and Fourth) competed in a separate cup competition.

The competition consisted of five rounds. In the first round each tie was played as a single leg and was held at the home ground of one of the two teams, according to the draw results. Each tie winner was qualifying to the next round. If a match was drawn, extra time was following. If extra time was drawn, there was a replay at the ground of the team who were away for the first game. If the rematch was also drawn, then extra time was following and if the match remained drawn after extra time the winner was decided by penalty shoot-out.

The next three rounds were played in a two-legged format, each team playing a home and an away match against their opponent. The team which scored more goals on aggregate, was qualifying to the next round. If the two teams scored the same number of goals on aggregate, then the team which scored more goals away from home was advancing to the next round.

If both teams had scored the same number of home and away goals, then extra time was following after the end of the second leg match. If during the extra thirty minutes both teams had managed to score, but they had scored the same number of goals, then the team who scored the away goals was advancing to the next round (i.e. the team which was playing away). If there weren't scored any goals during extra time, the qualifying team was determined by penalty shoot-out.

The final was a single match.

The cup winner secured a place in the 2014–15 UEFA Europa League.

== First round ==
The first round draw took place on 10 October 2013 and the matches played on 23, 30 October and 19 December 2013.

23 October 2013	Enosis Neon Paralimni	5−3 (a.e.t.)	Chalkanoras Idaliou	Tasos Markou Stadium, Paralimni
14:00 EET	López 18', 117', 120+1'; Cantero 43'; Pierettis 44'	(Report)	Paulinho 35'; Rodosthenous 40'; Stefani 74'	Referee: Iakovos Tokkaris

23 October 2013	AEZ Zakakiou	2−5	AEK Kouklia	Zakaki Municipal Stadium, Zakaki
14:00 EET	Vasiliou 10'; Demetriou 84' (pen.)		Sielis 25'; Araba 29', 63', 75'; Loukaidis 77'	Referee: Christos Christou

23 October 2013	Othellos Athienou	1−2 (a.e.t.)	AEK Larnaca	Othellos Athienou Stadium, Athienou
14:00 EET	Hadjigiannakou 66'	(Report)	Mitidis 6'; Englezou 118'	Referee: Georgios Nikolaou

23 October 2013	Doxa Katokopias	9−0	ASIL Lysi	Makario Stadium, Nicosia
14:00 EET	Pedrito 12'; Leandro 14', 26'; Carlitos 25', 77'; Charalambous 51'; Suárez 60'; Costa 67'; Baquero 84'			Referee: Costas Nikolaou

23 October 2013	Nikos & Sokratis Erimis	0−4	Omonia	Erimi Municipal Stadium, Erimi
14:00 EET		(Report)	Perikleous 9' (o.g.); Aguiar 52'; Taylor 36'; Roushias 83'	Attendance: 1,000; Referee: Nicolas Athanasiou

23 October 2013	Omonia Aradippou	0−5	Ermis Aradippou	Aradippou Municipal Stadium, Aradippou
14:00 EET		(Report)	Demetriou 19'; Pina 38'; Tagbajumi 60'; Alexiou 65'; De Azevedo 84'	Referee: Avraam Tsoukkas

23 October 2013	Nea Salamina	4−1	Karmiotissa Pano Polemidion	Ammochostos Stadium, Larnaca
14:00 EET	Ćurjurić 30'; Éder 53'; Lalín 59'; Roque 79'	(Report)	Neophytou 47'	Attendance: 500; Referee: Andreas Orthodoxou

23 October 2013	PAEEK	0−1	Aris Limassol	Keryneia-Epistrofi Stadium, Lakatamia
14:00 EET			Dina 80'	Referee: Loizos Panayiotou

23 October 2013	Ethnikos Achna	2−0	Ayia Napa	Dasaki Stadium, Achna
14:00 EET	Liliu 30'; Chidi 87'			Referee: Loucas Soteriou

23 October 2013	Onisilos Sotira	3−1	APEP	Sotira Municipal Stadium, Sotira
14:00 EET	Mashinya 37'; Tavares 87'; Loizou 90'	(Report)	Sykas 15'	Referee: Christos Aristodemou

23 October 2013	Enosis Neon Parekklisias	0−2	Olympiakos	Parekklisia Municipal Stadium, Parekklisia
14:00 EET		(Report)	Mavrou 74'; Ioannou 89'	Attendance: 300; Referee: Marios Ioannou

23 October 2013	Anorthosis	0−0 (a.e.t.) (5–4 p)	Anagennisi Deryneia	Antonis Papadopoulos Stadium, Larnaca
18:00 EET		(Report)		Attendance: 300; Referee: Stathis Manoli
	Penalties
	Ohayon (penalty scored); García (penalty scored); Grigalashvili (penalty scored); Andić (penalty scored); Ben Shushan (penalty scored)		(penalty scored) Kyprianou; (penalty scored) Siailis; (penalty scored) Therapontos; (penalty scored) Modestou; (penalty missed) Linardos

30 October 2013	Alki Larnaca	3−0	AEP Paphos	GSZ Stadium, Larnaca
14:00 EET	Laifis 6', 28'; Anastasiou 68'	(Report)		Referee: Giorgos Karavellas

19 December 2013	Digenis Oroklinis	2−4 (a.e.t.)	APOEL	Oroklini Municipal Stadium, Oroklini
14:30 EET	Parpas 50'; Tavrou 74'	(Report)	Elia 15' (pen.); Sheridan 52', 104'; Manduca 113' (pen.)	Attendance: 250; Referee: Avraam Tsoukkas

== Second round ==
The second round draw took place on 20 December 2013 and the matches played on 8, 15, 22 and 29 January 2014.

The following two teams advanced directly to second round, meeting the fourteen winners of first round ties:

- Apollon Limassol (2012–13 Cypriot Cup winner)
- AEL Limassol (2012–13 Cypriot Cup finalist)

Team 1	Agg.	Team 2	1st leg	2nd leg
Anorthosis	2–4	AEK Larnaca	1–1	1–3
AEK Kouklia	1–3	Ermis Aradippou	1–0	0–3 (Note: Cyprus Football Association awarded Ermis Aradippou a 3–0 win as a result of AEK Kouklia fielding three ineligible players from their U21 team. The match originally ended 0–1 to AEK Kouklia.)
Apollon Limassol	4–1	Nea Salamina	1–0	3–1
Alki Larnaca	5–3	Onisilos Sotira	3–3	2–0
Olympiakos Nicosia	1–9	Doxa Katokopias	1–3	0–6
Enosis Neon Paralimni	1–1 (a)	Ethnikos Achna	0–0	1–1
APOEL	2–0	AEL Limassol	1–0	1–0
Omonia	2–1	Aris Limassol	1–0	1–1

=== First leg ===
8 January 2014	Olympiakos Nicosia	1–3	Doxa Katokopias	Makario Stadium, Nicosia
14:30 EET	K. Vasiliou 76'	(Report)	Leandro 11', 51'; Vilela 56'	Attendance: 150; Referee: Avraam Tsoukkas

8 January 2014	AEK Kouklia	1–0	Ermis Aradippou	Pafiako Stadium, Paphos
15:00 EET	Garpozis 55' (pen.)	(Report)		Attendance: 200; Referee: Loizos Panayiotou

8 January 2014	Enosis Neon Paralimni	0–0	Ethnikos Achna	"Tasos Markou" Stadium, Paralimni
17:00 EET		(Report)		Attendance: 150; Referee: Christos Nicolaides

8 January 2014	Apollon Limassol	1–0	Nea Salamina	Tsirion Stadium, Limassol
18:00 EET	Papoulis 90'	(Report)		Attendance: 2,981; Referee: Leontios Trattou

8 January 2014	APOEL	1–0	AEL Limassol	GSP Stadium, Nicosia
19:00 EET	Sheridan 40'	(Report)		Attendance: Behind closed doors Referee: Marios Tsaggaris

15 January 2014	Omonia	1–0	Aris Limassol	GSP Stadium, Nicosia
18:00 EET	Alípio 80' (pen.)	(Report)		Attendance: 3,380; Referee: Ioannis Anastasiou

15 January 2014	Anorthosis	1–1	AEK Larnaca	Antonis Papadopoulos Stadium, Larnaca
19:00 EET	Ohayon 77'	(Report)	Pavlou 33' (pen.)	Attendance: 4,000; Referee: Thomas Mouskos

22 January 2014	Alki Larnaca	3–3	Onisilos Sotira	GSZ Stadium, Larnaca
15:00 EET	Lillis 21'; Demetriou 28'; Charalambous 41'	(Report)	Loizou 26', 62'; Kastanos 68'	Attendance: 50; Referee: Georgios Nikolaou

=== Second leg ===
15 January 2014	Doxa Katokopias	6–0 (9–1 agg.)	Olympiakos Nicosia	Makario Stadium, Nicosia
13:30 EET	Leandro 16' (pen.), 36'; Doroshenko 51', 62'; Pedrito 61'; Economides 88' (pen.)	(Report)		Attendance: 50; Referee: Loukas Soteriou

15 January 2014	Ermis Aradippou	3–0; Awarded (3–1 agg.)	AEK Kouklia	Ammochostos Stadium, Larnaca
17:00 EET		(Report)	Garpozis 90+3' (pen.)	Attendance: 300; Referee: Charalambos Skapoullis

22 January 2014	AEL Limassol	0–1 (0–2 agg.)	APOEL	Tsirion Stadium, Limassol
15:00 EET		(Report)	Manduca 64'	Attendance: 5,076; Referee: Demetris Masias

22 January 2014	Nea Salamina	1–3 (1–4 agg.)	Apollon Limassol	Ammochostos Stadium, Larnaca
17:00 EET	Dobrašinović 43'	(Report)	Psianos 56' (o.g.); Gullón 58'; Meriem 88'	Attendance: 1,600; Referee: Marios Tsaggaris

29 January 2014	Onisilos Sotira	0–2 (3–5 agg.)	Alki Larnaca	"Tasos Markou" Stadium, Paralimni
15:00 EET		(Report)	Nicolaou 22' (o.g.); Fylaktou 90+2'	Attendance: 25; Referee: Costas Nikolaou

29 January 2014	Ethnikos Achna	1–1 (1–1a agg.)	Enosis Neon Paralimni	Dasaki Stadium, Achna
15:00 EET	Cinquini 64' (o.g.)	(Report)	Tsiaklis 81'	Attendance: 300; Referee: Antonis Christodoulou

29 January 2014	AEK Larnaca	3–1 (4–2 agg.)	Anorthosis	GSZ Stadium, Larnaca
15:00 EET	Greene 43'; Tomás 75'; Englezou 89'	(Report)	Makris 85'	Attendance: 3,000; Referee: Leontios Trattou

29 January 2014	Aris Limassol	1–1 (1–2 agg.)	Omonia	Tsirion Stadium, Limassol
17:00 EET	Grassi 90+2'	(Report)	Platini 32'	Attendance: 1,112; Referee: Marios Panayi

== Quarter-finals ==
The quarter-finals draw took place on 30 January 2014 and the matches played on 12, 19, 26 February and 12 March 2014.

Team 1	Agg.	Team 2	1st leg	2nd leg
Alki Larnaca	0–3	APOEL	0–0	0–3
AEK Larnaca	0–2	Ermis Aradippou	0–0	0–2
Doxa Katokopias	2–0	Enosis Neon Paralimni	1–0	1–0
Omonia	2–2 (a)	Apollon Limassol	2–1	0−1

=== First legs ===
12 February 2014	Doxa Katokopias	1–0	Enosis Neon Paralimni	Makario Stadium, Nicosia
15:00 EET	Ramos 6' (pen.)	(Report)		Attendance: 64; Referee: Thomas Mouskos

12 February 2014	Alki Larnaca	0–0	APOEL	GSZ Stadium, Larnaca
18:00 EET		(Report)		Attendance: 500; Referee: Kostas Psevdiotis

12 February 2014	Omonia	2–1	Apollon Limassol	GSP Stadium, Nicosia
18:00 EET	Platini 11'; Gikiewicz 29'	(Report)	Haber 88'	Attendance: 6,673; Referee: Christos Nicolaides

19 February 2014	AEK Larnaca	0–0	Ermis Aradippou	GSZ Stadium, Larnaca
17:00 EET		(Report)		Attendance: 2,500; Referee: Leontios Trattou

=== Second legs ===
19 February 2014	Enosis Neon Paralimni	0–1 (0–2 agg.)	Doxa Katokopias	"Tasos Markou" Stadium, Paralimni
15:00 EET		(Report)	Cinquini 68' (o.g.)	Attendance: 51; Referee: Ioannis Anastasiou

19 February 2014	Apollon Limassol	1–0 (2–2a agg.)	Omonia	Tsirion Stadium, Limassol
16:00 EET	Robert 83'	(Report)		Attendance: 6,228; Referee: Marios Panayi

19 February 2014	APOEL	3–0 (3–0 agg.)	Alki Larnaca	GSP Stadium, Nicosia
17:00 EET	Charalambides 47', 74'; Manduca 65'	(Report)		Attendance: 3,246; Referee: Thomas Mouskos

12 March 2014	Ermis Aradippou	2–0 (2–0 agg.)	AEK Larnaca	Ammochostos Stadium, Larnaca
17:00 EET	Bemba 35'; Henrique 90+3' (pen.)	(Report)		Attendance: 2,000; Referee: Christos Nicolaides

== Semi-finals ==
The semi-finals draw took place on 26 March 2014 and the matches will be played on 2 and 9 April 2014.

Team 1	Agg.	Team 2	1st leg	2nd leg
Apollon Limassol	3–5	Ermis Aradippou	2–1	1–4 (a.e.t.)
APOEL	8–1	Doxa Katokopias	4–1	4–0

=== First leg ===
2 April 2014	Apollon Limassol	2–1	Ermis Aradippou	Tsirion Stadium, Limassol
17:00 EET	Gneki Guié 18'; Roberto 88'	(Report)	Tagbajumi 44'	Attendance: 4,000; Referee: Marios Panayi

2 April 2014	APOEL	4–1	Doxa Katokopias	GSP Stadium, Nicosia
19:00 EET	Alexandrou 20'; Oliveira 65'; Charalambides 72', 75'	(Report)	Ramos 62'	Attendance: 4,006; Referee: Ioannis Anastasiou

=== Second leg ===
9 April 2014	Doxa Katokopias	0–4 (1–8 agg.)	APOEL	Makario Stadium, Nicosia
16:00 EET		(Report)	Pipinis 45'; Adorno 60', 69'; Santin 71'	Attendance: 207; Referee: Leontios Trattou

9 April 2014	Ermis Aradippou	4–1 (a.e.t.) (5–3 agg.)	Apollon Limassol	Ammochostos Stadium, Larnaca
18:00 EET	Tagbajumi 57'; Taralidis 84'; Papathanasiou 100', 115'	(Report)	Sangoy 61'	Attendance: 4,000; Referee: Christos Nicolaides

== Final ==
21 May 2014
19:00 EET

Ermis Aradippou	0–2	APOEL
Pina (yellow card) 13'; Taralidis (yellow card) 45'; Bemba (yellow card) 83'	(Report 1) (Report 2)	De Vincenti 6'; Sheridan 28'; Oliveira (yellow card) 37'; Morais (yellow card) 45'; Antoniades (yellow card) 60'; Chiotis (yellow card) 70'

GSP Stadium, Nicosia
Attendance: 11,463
Referee: Christos Nicolaides

Ermis Aradippou	APOEL

Cypriot Cup 2013–14 Winners
APOEL
20th Title

== See also ==
- Cypriot Cup
- 2013–14 Cypriot First Division
- 2013–14 Cypriot Second Division

== Sources ==
- Official website (in Greek)
- "2013/14 Cyprus Cup". Rec.Sport.Soccer Statistics Foundation. 14 January 2016.
