= Dudu Biton =

Israeli footballer

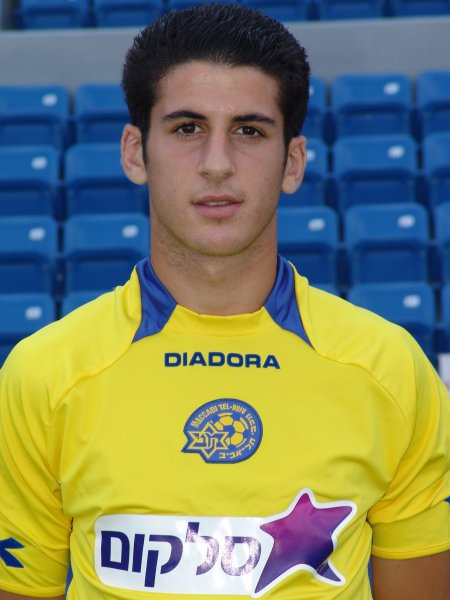

Personal information
- Full name: Dudu Biton
- Date of birth: 1 March 1988 (age 38)
- Place of birth: Netanya, Israel
- Height: 1.85 m (6 ft 1 in)
- Position: Striker

Team information
- Current team: Hapoel Kfar Saba
- Number: 11

Youth career
- Beitar Nes Tubruk
- –2006: Maccabi Haifa
- 2006–2007: Beitar Nes Tubruk

Senior career*
Years	Team	Apps	(Gls)
2006	Maccabi Haifa	1	(0)
2007–2008	Maccabi Tel Aviv	10	(0)
2008–2010	Hapoel Ra'anana	61	(17)
2010–2011	Hapoel Petah Tikva	15	(12)
2011–2012	Charleroi	12	(5)
2011–2012	→ Wisła Kraków (loan)	25	(11)
2012–2015	Standard Liège	10	(1)
2013	→ APOEL (loan)	13	(6)
2014	→ Alcorcón (loan)	6	(0)
2014	→ Maribor (loan)	11	(1)
2015	→ Hapoel Tel Aviv (loan)	12	(2)
2015–2017	Hapoel Tel Aviv	18	(1)
2016	→ Hapoel Kfar Saba (loan)	10	(2)
2018	Hapoel Acre	7	(0)
2018–2019	F.C. Ashdod	9	(2)
2019	Hapoel Haifa	2	(0)
2019–2021	Hapoel Afula	56	(19)
2021–2022	Sektzia Ness Ziona	34	(18)
2022–2023	Maccabi Petah Tikva	15	(1)
2023	Maccabi Jaffa	23	(5)
2023–2024	Hapoel Kfar Saba	4	(1)

International career
2004–2005	Israel U17	11	(1)
2006–2007	Israel U19	11	(9)
2008–2010	Israel U21	11	(3)
- * Club domestic league appearances and goals

Dudu Biton (Hebrew: דודו ביטון; born 1 March 1988) is an Israeli former professional footballer who plays as a striker.

== Career ==
=== Club ===
Biton played in the youth clubs of Beitar Nes Tubruk and Maccabi Haifa. He made his debut for Maccabi Haifa in Ligat ha'Al on 12 May 2006 in the last league fixture against Bnei Sakhnin, becoming a league champion. This was his only appearance for the senior team and during 2006–07 season he returned to Beitar Nes Tubruk.

Later he played for Maccabi Tel Aviv for one season before signing in Hapoel Ra'anana from Liga Leumit, where he took part of their historic promotion to Ligat ha'Al, their first since the club inception. On 16 July 2010, after two seasons with Hapoel Ra'anana, Biton signing in Hapoel Petah Tikva, just five days later he scored his first goal for Hapoel Petah Tikva in their loss against Hapoel Ashkelon.

On 4 January 2011, Biton signed with Charleroi from the bottom of the Belgian Pro League, which was relegated at the end of the 2010–11 season. After the season, Biton signed a one-year loan deal with Polish Ekstraklasa side Wisła Kraków. On 11 June 2012, he transferred to Standard Liège for an undisclosed fee, signing a four-year contract.

On 25 January 2013, Biton joined Cypriot side APOEL on a loan deal from Standard Liège until the end of 2012–13 season. Biton scored on his debut against Nea Salamina at GSP Stadium on 2 February 2013, just five minutes after being subbed in the 85th minute, to make the final score 2–0 for APOEL. He also scored in the following two matches, counting in total three goals in his first three appearances with APOEL. During his loan spell at APOEL, Biton scored six goals in 13 appearances and helped the club to win the 2012–13 Cypriot First Division.

On 13 January 2014, Biton joined Spanish second division team AD Alcorcón on a loan deal from Standard Liège until the end of 2013–14 season.

On January 16, 2015, Biton joined on loan Israeli first division team Hapoel Tel Aviv, signing a half year contract.

== Statistics ==
As of: 6 December 2014

Club	Season	League	Domestic League		Domestic Cups		European Cups		Total	
Club	Season	League	Apps	Goals	Apps	Goals	Apps	Goals	Apps	Goals
Maccabi Haifa	2005–06	Ligat ha'Al	1	0	0	0	0	0	1	0
Maccabi Haifa	2006–07	Ligat ha'Al	0	0	0	0	0	0	0	0
Maccabi Haifa	Total		1	0	0	0	0	0	1	0
Maccabi Tel Aviv	2007–08	Ligat ha'Al	10	0	4	0	3	0	17	0
Hapoel Ra'anana	2008–09	Liga Leumit	31	8	5	4	–		36	12
Hapoel Ra'anana	2009–10	Ligat ha'Al	30	9	6	3	–		36	12
Hapoel Ra'anana	Total		61	17	11	7	–		72	24
Hapoel Petah Tikva	2010–11	Ligat ha'Al	15	12	4	1	–		19	13
Charleroi	2010–11	Pro League	12	5	–		–		12	5
Wisła Kraków (loan)	2011–12	Ekstraklasa	25	11	4	2	7	3	36	16
Standard Liège	2012–13	Pro League	10	1	0	0	–		10	1
APOEL (loan)	2012–13	First Division	13	6	–		–		13	6
Standard Liège	2013–14	Pro League	0	0	1	1	5	0	6	1
Alcorcón (loan)	2013–14	Liga Adelante	6	0	–		–		6	0
Maribor (loan)	2014–15	PrvaLiga	11	1	3	1	0	0	14	2
Hapoel Tel Aviv (loan)	2014–15	Ligat Ha'Al	12	2	0	0	0	0	12	2
Career total			164	53	26	11	10	3	202	67

== Honours ==
Maccabi Haifa

- Israeli Premier League: 2005–06

APOEL

- First Division: 2012–13

Maribor

- Slovenian PrvaLiga: 2014–15
