= Marios Antoniadis =

Cypriot footballer (born 1990)

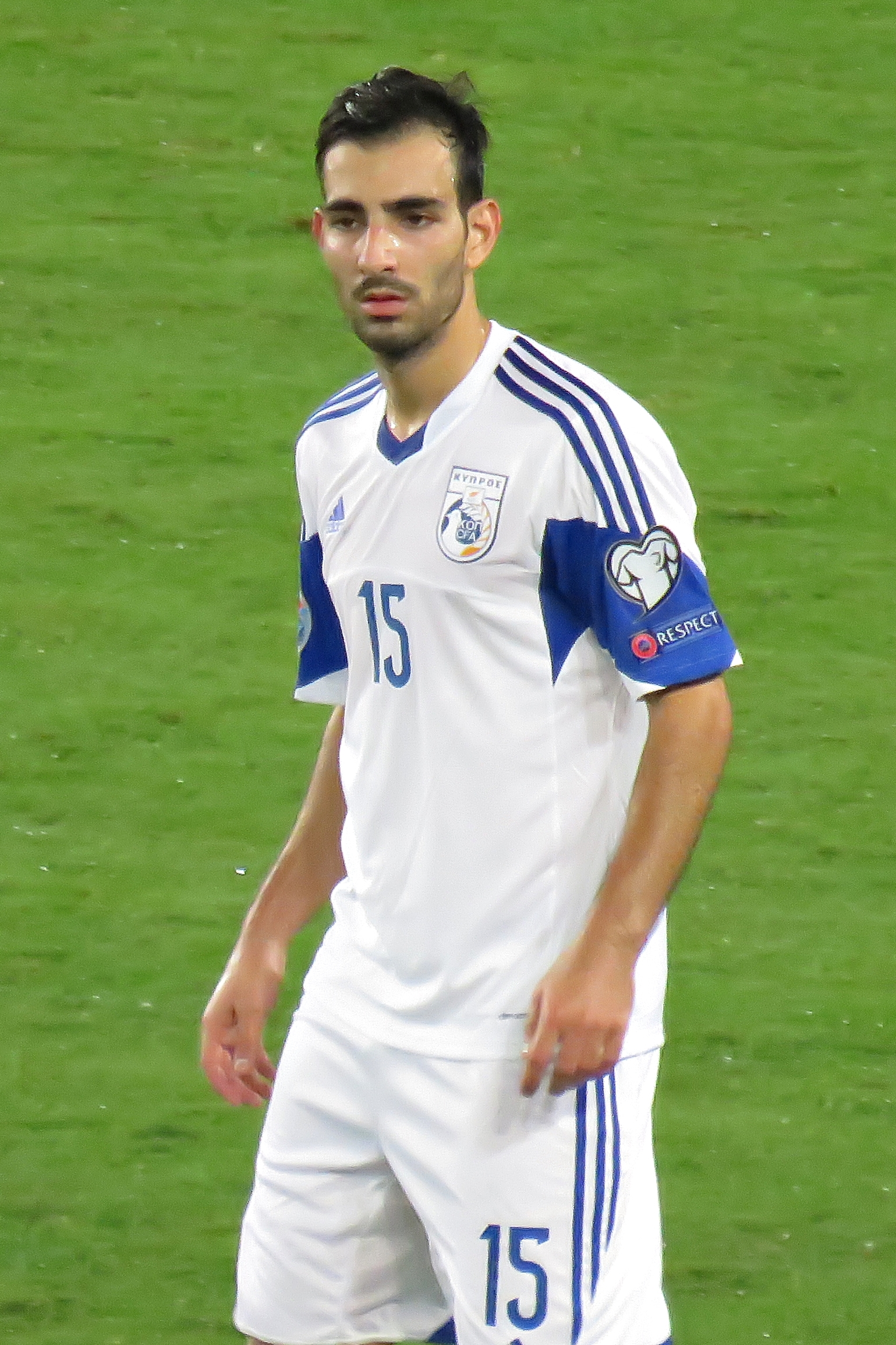
- Antoniadis with Cyprus.

Personal information
- Full name: Marios Antoniadis
- Date of birth: 14 May 1990 (age 36)
- Place of birth: Nicosia, Cyprus
- Height: 1.82 m (6 ft 0 in)
- Positions: Centre-back; left-back

Team information
- Current team: Doxa Katokopias
- Number: 23

Youth career
- APOEL

Senior career*
Years	Team	Apps	(Gls)
2007–2016	APOEL	53	(1)
2016–2017	Panionios	12	(0)
2017–2021	AEK Larnaca	52	(0)
2019–2020	→ Apollon Limassol (loan)	7	(0)
2021−2023	Anorthosis Famagusta	37	(2)
2023−	Doxa Katokopias	37	(0)

International career^{‡}
2008–2009	Cyprus U19	5	(0)
2009–2012	Cyprus U21	21	(0)
2012–	Cyprus	25	(0)
- * Club domestic league appearances and goals as of 27 May 2024 ‡ National team caps and goals as of 09 January 2022

Marios Antoniadis (Greek: Μάριος Αντωνιάδης; born 14 May 1990) is a Greek Cypriot professional footballer who plays for Cypriot First Division club, Doxa Katokopias. He primarily plays as a centre-back and more recently as a left-back.

== Early life ==
Antoniadis was born in Nicosia.

== Career ==
=== APOEL ===
Antoniadis is a product of APOEL Academies. He made his official debut with APOEL on 10 May 2008, playing the full 90 minutes in a 2007–08 Cypriot First Division match against Anorthosis. He added a further four appearances in the season's domestic Cup and another one appearance two years later in the 2009–10 Cypriot Cup. His second league appearance came on 7 May 2011, coming on as a substitute in a 2010–11 Cypriot First Division match against AEK Larnaca.

In the 2012–13 season, Antoniadis appeared in six league matches and at the end he became a champion after winning the Cypriot First Division with APOEL. He made his debut in European competitions on 12 December 2013, playing 64 minutes in APOEL's 2–0 defeat at Eintracht Frankfurt for the last matchday of the UEFA Europa League group stage. On 26 April 2014, he scored his first official goal for APOEL, in his team's 1–2 home defeat against Ermis Aradippou for the Cypriot First Division. During the 2013–14 season, Antoniadis achieved to win all the titles in Cyprus, the Cypriot League, the Cypriot Cup and the Cypriot Super Cup.

Antoniadis made his UEFA Champions League debut in the 2014–15 season, appearing in five group stage matches in that season APOEL's campaign. In the 2014–15 season, he managed to add two more titles to his collection, as APOEL won again both the Cypriot championship and the cup. After he crowned 2015–16 Cypriot First Division champion for a fourth time in the row, he decided to leave APOEL as his contract with the club ended.

=== Panionios ===
On 1 July 2016, Antoniadis signed a two-year contract with Greek Super League side Panionios.

=== AEK Larnaca ===
On 13 June 2017, Antoniadis signed a two-year contract with Greek Cypriot League side AEK Larnaca. He made his official debut with AEK on 29 June 2017, playing the full 90 minutes in a 2017–18 UEFA Europa League match against Lincoln.

==== Loan to Apollon Limassol ====
On 28 August 2019, Antoniadis joined Apollon Limassol on loan until the end of the season. He played with Apollon Limassol for 7 games.

=== Anorthosis Famagusta ===
On 21 June 2021, it was announced that Antoniadis had signed for Anorthosis Famagusta until June 2023. He made his debut with the team on 13 July 2021, playing the full 90 minutes in a Cypriot Super Cup match against Omonoia.

On 30 August 2022, Anorthosis announced the renewal of Antoniadis contract until the summer of 2024.

==== Head injury ====
On 19 March 2022, Antoniadis was seriously injured in a match Anorthosis against Pafos FC. He suffered a head injury after 48 minutes when he slipped on his foot and a Pafos FC player from behind accidentally hit him in the back of the head, knocking him unconscious and causing a crowd.

After his injury, he said: "All I can do is thank you from the bottom of my heart for your support and messages! I will come back stronger!"

==== Return ====
Antoniadis made his comeback wearing a rugby style headguard in a UEFA Nations League 1–0 win against Greece on 24 September 2022.

=== Doxa Katokopias ===
On 15 August 2023, Antoniadis signed a two-year contract with Greek Cypriot League side Doxa Katokopias. He made his official debut with Doxa on 21 August 2023, playing match against AEL.

== International career ==
On 10 October 2012, Antoniadis was called for the first time into the Cyprus national team for the 2014 FIFA World Cup qualification matches against Slovenia and Norway, but he remained on the bench in both matches. He made his debut for the national team on 14 November 2012, in a friendly match against Finland at GSP Stadium, coming on as an 87th-minute substitute in Cyprus' 0–3 defeat.

== Honours ==
APOEL

- Cypriot First Division: 2008–09, 2010–11, 2012–13, 2013–14, 2014–15, 2015–16
- Cypriot Cup: 2007–08, 2013–14, 2014–15
- Cypriot Super Cup: 2008, 2009, 2011, 2013

AEK Larnaca

- Cypriot Cup: 2017–18
