= Aldo Adorno =

Paraguayan footballer (born 1982)

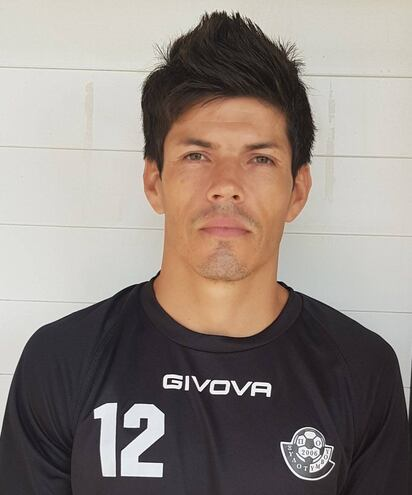

Personal information
- Full name: Aldo Osmar Adorno Moreira
- Date of birth: 8 April 1982 (age 44)
- Place of birth: Borja, Paraguay
- Height: 1.75 m (5 ft 9 in)
- Positions: Right winger; striker

Team information
- Current team: Podosfairikos Omilos Xylotymbou 2006 (manager)

Youth career
- Sportivo Luqueño

Senior career*
Years	Team	Apps	(Gls)
1998–2000	Sportivo Luqueño	5	(0)
2000–2001	Irapuato		
2001–2002	Cruz Azul Oaxaca		
2002–2003	Sol de América	17	(3)
2003–2004	Maccabi Tel Aviv	30	(4)
2004–2005	Almería	13	(0)
2005–2006	Baza	32	(2)
2006–2007	EN Paralimni	19	(5)
2007–2009	AEK Larnaca	47	(10)
2009–2011	Apollon Limassol	48	(11)
2011–2014	APOEL	41	(14)
2014–2015	Metalurh Donetsk	4	(1)
2015	Ermis Aradippou	1	(0)
2015–2016	Nea Salamina	25	(5)
2016–2017	Othellos Athienou	20	(11)
2017–2018	THOI Lakatamia	18	(6)
2018–2019	POX	21	(7)

Managerial career
- 2019–2021: Anorthosis (youth)
- 2021–2022: EN Paralimni (youth)
- 2022: Nea Salamis (assistant)
- 2022–2023: Ermis Aradippou (assistant)
- 2023: Ermis Aradippou
- 2023–: POX
- * Club domestic league appearances and goals as of 30 November 2023

Aldo Osmar Adorno Moreira (born 8 April 1982) is a Paraguayan footballer who plays as a forward for P.O. Xylotymbou in the Cypriot Third Division.

== Career ==
=== Paraguay – Israel – Spain ===
Adorno started his career from Sportivo Luqueño of Paraguay. He moved from Sol de América to Maccabi Tel Aviv on summer of 2003. The next year he played for UD Almería in the Spanish Segunda División. He also played for CD Baza.

=== Cyprus ===
==== E.N. Paralimni – AEK Larnaca – Apollon Limassol ====
He moved to Cyprus and Enosis in 2006. One year later he moved to AEK Larnaca, where he stayed for two seasons. In summer 2009 he signed a contract with Apollon Limassol and in his first season with Apollon he helped his team to win the 2009–10 Cypriot Cup.

==== APOEL ====
In June 2011 he signed a two-year contract with APOEL. On 20 July 2011, he scored his first official goal for APOEL, in a UEFA Champions League 2nd qualifying round match against Skënderbeu Korçë, by scoring APOEL's third goal in a 4–0 home win. He also appeared in four 2011–12 UEFA Champions League matches for APOEL, in the club's surprising run to the quarter-finals of the competition. On 9 August 2012, he scored the only goal in APOEL's 0–1 victory against Aalesunds FK at Color Line Stadion, for the return leg of the UEFA Europa League 2nd qualifying round. On 3 September 2012, Adorno scored a hat-trick in APOEL's 0–5 win at Tasos Markou Stadium against Enosis Neon Paralimni for the first matchday of the 2012–13 Cypriot First Division. Two months later, on 5 November 2012, Adorno scored his second hat-trick of the season in APOEL's 4–1 league win at GSP Stadium against Ayia Napa. At the end of the season, he became a champion for the first time in his career after winning the 2012–13 Cypriot First Division with APOEL. The next season, his third as an APOEL player, he won all the titles in Cyprus, the Cypriot League, the Cypriot Cup and the Cypriot Super Cup. On 1 September 2014, his contract with APOEL was mutually terminated.

==== Metalurh Donetsk ====
On 10 September 2014, Adorno signed a contract with Ukrainian side Metalurh Donetsk. But in the winter transfer window, he returned Cyprus with Ermis Aradippou.

== Honours ==
Apollon Limassol

- Cypriot Cup (1) : 2009–10

APOEL

- Cypriot First Division (2) : 2012–13, 2013–14
- Cypriot Cup (1) : 2013–14
- Cypriot Super Cup (2) : 2011, 2013

== Personal info ==
Aldo Adorno also holds a Spanish passport, except of the Paraguayan.
