= Francisco Zuela =

Angolan footballer

Personal information
- Full name: José Luis Francisco Zuela dos Santos
- Date of birth: 3 August 1983 (age 43)
- Place of birth: Luanda, Angola
- Height: 1.82 m (6 ft 0 in)
- Positions: Centre back; defensive midfielder

Youth career
- União de Leiria

Senior career*
| Years | Team | Apps | (Gls) |
| 2002–2003 | Sertanense | 27 | (3) |
| 2003–2004 | Académica de Coimbra | 1 | (0) |
| 2004–2005 | Santa Clara | 29 | (1) |
| 2005–2006 | Akratitos | 14 | (0) |
| 2006–2009 | Skoda Xanthi | 87 | (3) |
| 2009–2012 | Kuban Krasnodar | 11 | (0) |
| 2010 | → Alania Vladikavkaz (loan) | 6 | (0) |
| 2010–2011 | → PAOK (loan) | 7 | (0) |
| 2011–2012 | → Atromitos (loan) | 21 | (0) |
| 2012–2013 | APOEL | 6 | (0) |
| 2013 | Apollon Smyrnis | 1 | (0) |
| 2014–2015 | Kabuscorp | ? | (?) |
| 2015 | Trofense | 0 | (0) |

International career
| 2006–2012 | Angola | 19 | (0) |
- * Club domestic league appearances and goals

Francisco Zuela (born 3 August 1983) is an Angolan former footballer.

== Club career ==
Zuela started his career in 2002 with the Portuguese club Sertanense F.C. In Portugal, he also represented Académica de Coimbra and C.D. Santa Clara.

In 2005, he signed a contract with the Greek club Akratitos. The next season, he moved to Skoda Xanthi, spending three seasons to the club.

On 8 December 2009, Zuela arrived for a trial with Wigan Athletic, but that trial ended without a contract offer.

In 2009, he moved to Russia and signed with Kuban Krasnodar, but the next year he was given on loan to Alania Vladikavkaz. In July 2012, he was given on loan from Kuban to PAOK in Greece and in the 2011–12 season, he was given again on loan to another Greek club, Atromitos.

On 5 June 2012, Zuela terminated his contract with Kuban and signed a two-year contract with the Cypriot club APOEL. Although he did not manage to win a regular place in APOEL's starting lineup (he appeared in only six league matches), he became a champion for the first time in his career after winning the 2012–13 Cypriot First Division with the club. On 17 July 2013 his contract with APOEL was mutually terminated.

Later, he had a five-month spell at Apollon Smyrnis in Greece, appearing only in one match for twelve minutes as a substitute, and being released before the end of year 2013.

== International career ==
Zuela was a member of the Angola national football team. He made 19 appearances without scoring any goal.

== Career statistics ==
=== International ===
Appearances and goals by national team and year
| National team | Year | Apps | Goals |
|---|---|---|---|
| Angola | 2005 | 1 | 0 |
| Angola | 2006 | 1 | 0 |
| Angola | 2007 | – | |
| Angola | 2008 | – | |
| Angola | 2009 | 1 | 0 |
| Angola | 2010 | 6 | 0 |
| Angola | 2011 | 4 | 0 |
| Angola | 2012 | 6 | 0 |
| Total | | 19 | 0 |

== Honours ==
APOEL

- Cypriot First Division: 2012–13
