= Mário Sérgio (footballer, born 1981) =

Portuguese footballer

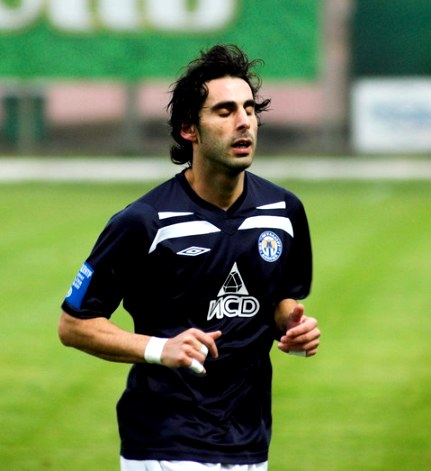
- Mario Sérgio with Metalurh Donetsk in 2009

Personal information
- Full name: Mário Sérgio Leal Nogueira
- Date of birth: 28 July 1981 (age 45)
- Place of birth: Paredes, Portugal
- Height: 1.74 m (5 ft 9 in)
- Position: Right-back

Youth career
- 1989–2000: Paços Ferreira

Senior career*
Years	Team	Apps	(Gls)
2000–2003	Paços Ferreira	52	(2)
2003–2006	Sporting CP	12	(0)
2005–2006	→ Vitória Guimarães (loan)	16	(0)
2006–2008	Naval	57	(1)
2008–2012	Metalurh Donetsk	103	(4)
2012–2016	APOEL	112	(5)
2017	Apollon Limassol	16	(0)
2017–2019	Varzim	50	(0)
2019–2021	Felgueiras 1932	43	(2)
2021–2022	Maia Lidador	30	(1)
2022–2023	Aliados Lordelo	34	(1)
Total		525	(16)

International career
2002	Portugal U20	6	(0)
2002–2004	Portugal U21	16	(0)
2004	Portugal Olympic	3	(0)
2004	Portugal B	2	(0)
Medal record
Men's football
Representing Portugal
UEFA European Under-21 Championship
Third place	2004 Germany
- * Club domestic league appearances and goals

Mário Sérgio Leal Nogueira (born 28 July 1981), known as Mário Sérgio, is a Portuguese former professional footballer who played as a right-back.

He amassed Primeira Liga totals of 137 matches and three goals over eight seasons, representing Paços de Ferreira, Sporting CP, Vitória de Guimarães and Naval. Abroad, he played for Metalurh Donetsk, APOEL and Apollon Limassol, winning seven major titles with the second club.

Mário Sérgio appeared with Portugal at the 2004 Olympic Games.

== Club career ==
=== Portugal ===
Born in Paredes, Mário Sérgio was a youth graduate of F.C. Paços de Ferreira, making his Primeira Liga debut on 1 October 2000 by playing four minutes in a 4–1 home win against C.F. Estrela da Amadora. He was first choice the following two seasons.

Mário Sérgio joined Sporting CP on 25 June 2003 on a four-year contract, being the first signing of manager Fernando Santos; he said upon his arrival: "I am an ambitious player. I have fought for this opportunity and now want to show my worth". However, three years later and with only 18 competitive appearances to his credit, also being loaned to fellow league side Vitória de Guimarães, he was released.

Immediately after leaving the Lions, Mário Sérgio signed for two years with Associação Naval 1º de Maio also in the top division. He was an undisputed starter during his tenure, scoring his third and last league goal on 14 January 2007 to contribute to a 3–0 away victory over Vitória de Setúbal.

=== Metalurh Donetsk ===
On 27 July 2008, Mário Sérgio moved to FC Metalurh Donetsk for an undisclosed fee. He made his Ukrainian Premier League on 19 August, in a 1–0 home defeat of FC Karpaty Lviv.

Mário Sérgio renewed his link for two more years on 25 September 2009, keeping him at the club until 2012. In March 2012, he became the first player to appear in 100 league games for Metalurh, achieving this feat against SC Tavriya Simferopol; he was released midway through that month alongside two other players, however, having scored twice in the competition, both goals coming against Karpaty in September 2011.

=== APOEL ===
On 15 May 2012, Mário Sérgio signed a two-year deal with Cypriot club APOEL FC, scoring his first goal against Alki Larnaca FC in a last-minute equaliser. He also participated with the team in the qualifying phase of the UEFA Europa League, netting against Aalesunds FK in a 2–1 home victory. He won the First Division at the end of his debut campaign, which was the first major accolade of his career.

On 17 August 2013, APOEL beat Apollon Limassol FC 1–0 to win the Cypriot Super Cup and Mário Sérgio scored a rare goal in the 35th minute. During the season, he appeared in five games in the group stage of the Europa League, and helped his side conquer the treble as they went on to add the league and the Cup.

Mário Sérgio agreed to a two-year extension on 6 December 2014, running until June 2017.

=== Later years ===
On 30 December 2016, after he cut ties with APOEL, free agent Mário Sérgio signed a six-month deal with Apollon Limassol with an option for a further season. He subsequently returned to his homeland, where he played for Varzim S.C. and F.C. Felgueiras 1932.

== International career ==
Mário Sérgio played for the Portuguese under-21s for two years, representing the nation at the 2004 UEFA European Championship, and was also in squad for the 2004 Summer Olympics football tournament. He won his first cap for the former on 15 October 2002, in a 4–2 loss in Turkey in the 2004 European Championship qualifiers.

== Career statistics ==
As of 21 December 2016

Appearances and goals by club, season and competition
Club	Season	League			National cup		League cup		Continental (Note: Includes UEFA Champions League and UEFA Europa League.)		Other (Note: Includes Cypriot Super Cup.)		Total	
Club	Season	Division	Apps	Goals	Apps	Goals	Apps	Goals	Apps	Goals	Apps	Goals	Apps	Goals
Paços Ferreira	2000–01	Primeira Liga	2	0	0	0	—		—		—		2	0
Paços Ferreira	2001–02	Primeira Liga	23	1	3	0	—		—		—		26	1
Paços Ferreira	2002–03	Primeira Liga	27	1	3	0	—		—		—		30	1
Paços Ferreira	Total		52	2	6	0	—		—		—		58	2
Sporting CP	2003–04	Primeira Liga	10	0	1	0	—		4	0	—		15	0
Sporting CP	2004–05	Primeira Liga	2	0	0	0	—		1	0	—		3	0
Sporting CP	Total		12	0	1	0	—		5	0	—		18	0
Vitória Guimarães (loan)	2005–06	Primeira Liga	16	0	1	0	—		6	1	—		23	1
Naval	2006–07	Primeira Liga	29	1	3	0	—		—		—		32	1
Naval	2007–08	Primeira Liga	28	0	4	0	1	0	—		—		33	0
Naval	Total		57	1	7	0	1	0	—		—		65	1
Metalurh Donetsk	2008–09	Ukrainian Premier League	30	0	3	0	—		—		—		33	0
Metalurh Donetsk	2009–10	Ukrainian Premier League	29	2	4	0	—		6	1	—		39	3
Metalurh Donetsk	2010–11	Ukrainian Premier League	27	0	1	0	—		—		—		28	0
Metalurh Donetsk	2011–12	Ukrainian Premier League	17	2	2	2	—		—		—		19	4
Metalurh Donetsk	Total		103	4	10	2	—		6	1	—		119	7
APOEL	2012–13	Cypriot First Division	24	3	2	1	—		6	1	—		32	5
APOEL	2013–14	Cypriot First Division	35	2	4	0	—		9	0	1	1	49	3
APOEL	2014–15	Cypriot First Division	30	0	7	0	—		10	0	1	0	48	0
APOEL	2015–16	Cypriot First Division	21	0	3	0	—		11	0	1	0	36	0
APOEL	2016–17	Cypriot First Division	2	0	0	0	—		1	0	0	0	3	0
APOEL	Total		112	5	16	1	—		37	1	3	1	168	8
Career total			352	12	41	3	1	0	54	3	3	1	451	19

== Honours ==
APOEL

- Cypriot First Division: 2012–13, 2013–14, 2014–15, 2015–16
- Cypriot Cup: 2013–14, 2014–15
- Cypriot Super Cup: 2013
