= Constantinos Charalambidis =

Cypriot retired footballer

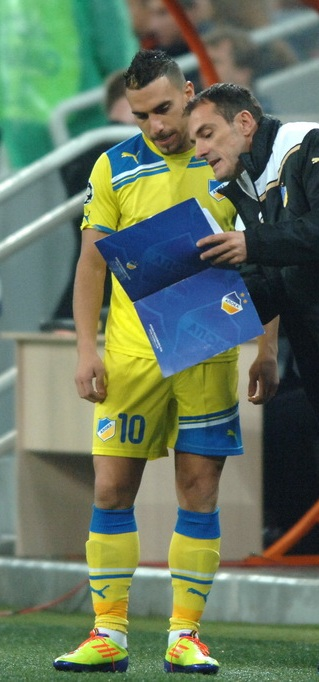

Personal information
- Full name: Constantinos Charalambidis
- Date of birth: 25 July 1981 (age 45)
- Place of birth: Nicosia, Cyprus
- Height: 1.72 m (5 ft 7 1/2 in)
- Position: Right winger

Team information
- Current team: Krasava ENY Ypsonas FC (manager)

Youth career
- APOEL

Senior career*
Years	Team	Apps	(Gls)
1998–2005	APOEL	101	(25)
2005–2007	Panathinaikos	46	(1)
2006	→ PAOK (loan)	16	(1)
2007–2008	Carl Zeiss Jena	12	(1)
2008–2016	APOEL	235	(41)
2016–2017	AEK Larnaca	23	(3)
Total		433	(72)

International career^{‡}
2003–2017	Cyprus	93	(12)

Managerial career
- 2020–2021: Cyprus (assistant)
- 2021–2022: Cyprus U17
- 2023–2025: Ypsonas
- * Club domestic league appearances and goals as of 17 April 2018 ‡ National team caps and goals as of 20 April 2018

Constantinos Charalambidis (also spelled Konstantinos Charalampidis; Greek: Κωνσταντίνος Χαραλαμπίδης; born 25 July 1981) is a Cypriot former professional footballer.

During his career, Charalambidis became captain of Apoel Nicosia and the Cyprus National Team.

Charalambidis began his career at APOEL, where he remained from 1997 to 2004, before moving to Greece to play for Panathinaikos from 2004 to 2007. During that time, he was loaned to PAOK for one year in 2006. He also played for Carl Zeiss Jena in Germany before returning home to APOEL in 2008.

During his second spell with APOEL, he earned a total of 18 titles, 6 appearances in European competition group stages, and played in APOEL's run to the quarter-finals of the 2012 UEFA Champions League. APOEL did not renew his contract at the end of the 2016 season, and Charalambidis stayed in Cyprus for AEK Larnaka.

At the beginning of his first season with the club, he was considered a reserve at AEK Larnaka and later AEK Larnaka terminated his contract.

Charalambidis made 93 appearances with the Cypriot national team, scoring 12 goals in total.

== Club career ==
=== APOEL ===
Charalambidis began his career in the 1998–99 season with Cypriot club APOEL where he became a regular, appearing 121 times, and helped lead them to two championship titles in 2002 and 2004. He also won one Cup in 1999 and two Super Cups in 2002 and 2004.

=== Panathinaikos / PAOK ===
Charalambidis then signed a two-and-a-half-year contract with Panathinaikos while the 2004–05 season was in progress. He would make a total of 44 league appearances for Panathinaikos, including appearances in the Champions League group stage in 2005. During the 2005/06 season he gathered 8 assists, third highest in the Super League, however, in the summer of 2007 the club chose not to renew his contract. In his final season with Panathinaikos, Charalambidis spent the first six months of the season on loan to PAOK, where he made 16 league appearances and scored one goal.

=== Carl Zeiss Jena ===
In the summer of 2007, Charalambidis spent time on trial at English Championship side Cardiff City but eventually signed with German club FC Carl Zeiss Jena, playing in the 2. Bundesliga for the 2007–08 season.

In the first half of the 2007–08 season, Charalambidis featured regularly for Carl Zeiss Jena, making 10 starts and 12 total appearances and scoring one goal, but in January 2008 he and the relegation-bound club agreed it was better for both the player and the club to part ways, and the contract was mutually terminated.

=== APOEL ===
Not long thereafter, APOEL managed to lure Charalambidis back to Cyprus to again play for his former team, and on 27 January he signed a four-year contract with APOEL. Since then he won the 2007–08 Cypriot Cup, the 2008–09 Cypriot First Division and also two Cypriot Super Cups (2008 and 2009) with APOEL. He also appeared in five official 2009–10 UEFA Champions League group stage matches with APOEL.

The next year he won the 2010–11 Cypriot First Division adding another championship title to his honours list. The following season, he appeared in nine 2011–12 UEFA Champions League matches for APOEL and provided three assists to his teammates, in the club's surprising run to the quarter-finals of the competition.

The next season, he won again the 2012–13 Cypriot First Division, which was his 5th league title in his career with APOEL. During the 2013–14 season, he appeared in five 2013–14 UEFA Europa League group stage matches for APOEL and won all the titles in Cyprus, the Cypriot League, the Cypriot Cup and the Cypriot Super Cup.

Charalambidis made his only group stage appearance in APOEL's 2014–15 UEFA Champions League campaign on 17 September 2014, coming on as a 79th-minute substitute in his team's 1–0 defeat against FC Barcelona at Camp Nou. In the 2014–15 season, he managed to add two more titles to his collection, as APOEL won again both the Cypriot championship and the cup.

On 15 May 2016, in the match which he lifted the 2015–16 Cypriot First Division trophy as APOEL captain, he announced that it was his farewell appearance to a club where he had spent and captained for his almost entire career, appearing in more than 400 matches in all competitions and winning 18 domestic titles.

=== AEK Larnaca ===
On 1 June 2016, Charalambidis joined fellow Cypriot First Division club AEK Larnaca on a two-year contract. In October 2017 he ended his long football career.

== International career ==
Over time, Charalambidis became a significant player for the Cypriot national team, holding the second most total appearances for any player on the national team. He scored twice in their 5–2 win over the Republic of Ireland in the Euro 2008 qualifiers in October 2006, and also scored in their 3–1 win over Wales during the same campaign. The midfielder also scored twice in Cyprus' 4–1 win over Bulgaria in a World Cup qualifying match in October 2009.

=== International goals ===
Scores and results list Cyprus' goal tally first.

No	Date	Venue	Opponent	Score	Result	Competition
1.	19 February 2004	Makario Stadium, Nicosia, Cyprus	Georgia	1–0	3–1	2004 Cyprus International Football Tournament
2.	19 February 2004	Makario Stadium, Nicosia, Cyprus	Georgia	2–0	3–1	2004 Cyprus International Football Tournament
3.	21 February 2004	Tsirion Stadium, Limassol, Cyprus	Kazakhstan	1–0	2–1	2004 Cyprus International Football Tournament
4.	8 February 2005	Tsirion Stadium, Limassol, Cyprus	Austria	1–1	1–1 (5–4 pen.)	2005 Cyprus International Football Tournament
5.	26 March 2005	GSZ Stadium, Larnaca, Cyprus	Jordan	1–0	2–1	Friendly
6.	7 October 2006	GSP Stadium, Nicosia, Cyprus	Republic of Ireland	4–2	4–0	UEFA Euro 2008 qualification
7.	7 October 2006	GSP Stadium, Nicosia, Cyprus	Republic of Ireland	5–2	4–0	UEFA Euro 2008 qualification
8.	13 October 2007	GSP Stadium, Nicosia, Cyprus	Wales	3–1	3–1	UEFA Euro 2008 qualification
9.	12 August 2009	Qemal Stafa Stadium, Tirana, Albania	Albania	1–1	1–6	Friendly
10.	10 October 2009	Antonis Papadopoulos Stadium, Larnaca, Cyprus	Bulgaria	1–0	4–1	2010 FIFA World Cup qualification
11.	10 October 2009	Antonis Papadopoulos Stadium, Larnaca, Cyprus	Bulgaria	2–0	4–1	2010 FIFA World Cup qualification
12.	13 October 2015	GSP Stadium, Nicosia, Cyprus	Bosnia and Herzegovina	1–1	2–3	UEFA Euro 2016 qualification

== Honours ==
APOEL

- Cypriot First Division (8) : 2001–02, 2003–04, 2008–09, 2010–11, 2012–13, 2013–14, 2014–15, 2015–16
- Cypriot Cup (4) : 1998–99, 2007–08, 2013–14, 2014–15
- Cypriot Super Cup (6) : 2002, 2004, 2008, 2009, 2011, 2013
