= Gustavo Manduca =

Brazilian footballer and manager (born 1980)

Personal information
- Full name: Gustavo Manduca
- Date of birth: 8 June 1980 (age 46)
- Place of birth: Urussanga, Brazil
- Height: 1.82 m (6 ft 0 in)
- Positions: Forward; attacking midfielder

Senior career*
Years	Team	Apps	(Gls)
1997	Grêmio	0	(0)
1998–1999	HJK	2	(0)
1998	→ Atlantis (loan)	10	(2)
1999	Felgueiras	13	(2)
2000	Esposende	18	(6)
2000–2003	Chaves	70	(22)
2003–2004	Paços Ferreira	29	(3)
2004–2005	Marítimo	46	(11)
2006–2007	Benfica	16	(1)
2006–2007	→ AEK Athens (loan)	23	(5)
2007–2010	AEK Athens	73	(9)
2010–2015	APOEL	125	(45)
Total		395	(106)

Managerial career
- 2015: APOEL (caretaker)
- 2016: Othellos Athienou
- * Club domestic league appearances and goals

Gustavo Manduca (born 8 June 1980) is a Brazilian former footballer who played as a forward or an attacking midfielder. Later, he worked briefly as a manager.

He also held an Italian passport, and played professionally in five countries, mainly in Portugal – where he represented six teams in seven years, including a very brief spell with Benfica. He amassed Primeira Liga totals of 91 games and 15 goals over three seasons.

Manduca signed with APOEL in 2010 from AEK Athens, remaining with the former club until his retirement and winning eight major titles.

== Club career ==
=== Early years and Portugal ===
Manduca was born in Urussanga, Santa Catarina. After a brief spell with Grêmio he signed with Finnish club HJK in 1998 and, after only two matches, was loaned to Atlantis of the country's second division for the remainder of the season.

In 1999, Manduca moved to Portugal, successively representing Felgueiras, Esposende and Chaves, all in the Segunda Liga. In the 2003–04 campaign he made his Primeira Liga debut, joining Paços de Ferreira.

Manduca blossomed into a top-flight player with Marítimo, where he scored in a 2004–05 UEFA Cup first round penalty shootout exit against Rangers, moving to Benfica in January 2006 on a four-and-a-half-year contract. He appeared in 16 league games in his only season, netting in a 3–1 loss at União de Leiria on 4 February.

=== AEK Athens ===
In August 2006, Manduca signed a one-year loan with the option for a permanent move with AEK Athens, as he was deemed surplus to requirements by new Benfica manager Fernando Santos. He made three appearances in that season's UEFA Champions League, and helped the club to the second place in the Super League Greece. On 16 May 2007, he agreed to a permanent three-year deal for a fee of €800,000.

On 2 May 2009, Manduca and his team reached the final of the Greek Cup, losing to Olympiacos 15–14 on penalties after a 4–4 draw in extra time.

=== APOEL ===
After four years of regular use at AEK, the 30-year-old Manduca signed a three-year contract with APOEL from Cyprus. In his debut season he won the First Division for the first national championship of his career, scoring ten goals and providing as many assists.

On 13 September 2011, in a home game against Zenit Saint Petersburg in the Champions League, Manduca scored the equaliser in the 73rd minute and, two minutes later, assisted compatriot Aílton for the final 2–1 win and the club's first ever in that stage of the competition. On 1 November, he netted in the last minute against Porto (same competition, venue and result). In the round-of-16's second leg against Lyon, on 7 March 2012, he scored the 1–0 at home which levelled the tie, being sent off before the penalty shootout victory. On 4 April 2012, he scored his side's first goal in an eventual 5–2 quarter-final loss at Real Madrid (8–2 on aggregate).

Manduca won his second Cypriot league in 2012–13, starting in all 32 league matches and scoring 12 times. On 31 May 2013, he agreed to a two-year extension.

The following campaign, Manduca bettered that total to a career-best 13 goals, being an essential attacking unit as his team conquered the treble of league, Cup and Super Cup. He was also a regular in the next season's Champions League group stage and equalised from the penalty spot in a 1–1 home draw with Ajax on 30 September 2014.

On 30 March 2015, aged 34, Manduca announced his immediate retirement from football due to a serious ankle injury. The same day, he was appointed director of football at APOEL, signing a two-year contract with the club.

Manduca left the GSP Stadium on 7 October 2015 after only six months in the post, by mutual consent.

== Managerial career ==
=== APOEL ===
On 11 May 2015, following the dismissal of Thorsten Fink, Manduca took over as caretaker manager for APOEL's crucial final two games of the season as well as the Cypriot Cup final, alongside assistant Giorgos Kostis and former club captain Marinos Satsias. His short spell in charge saw the team win the double after beating AEL Limassol 4–2 in the domestic cup decider, and collecting the four points needed to conquer the league title.

=== Othellos ===
At the end of the 2015–16 season, Manduca agreed terms with Cypriot Second Division side Othellos Athienou to take over as manager. On 21 November 2016, after only a few months in charge, his contract was terminated due to a poor string of results.

== Honours ==
=== Player ===
HJK

- Finnish Cup: 1998
- Finnish League Cup: 1998

APOEL

- Cypriot First Division: 2010–11, 2012–13, 2013–14, 2014–15
- Cypriot Cup: 2013–14, 2014–15
- Cypriot Super Cup: 2011, 2013

=== Manager ===
APOEL

- Cypriot First Division: 2014–15
- Cypriot Cup: 2014–15
