= Jorge Tavares (footballer, born 1986) =

Portuguese footballer

Personal information
- Full name: Jorge Humberto Pinto Tavares
- Date of birth: 22 April 1986 (age 40)
- Place of birth: Oeiras, Portugal
- Height: 1.76 m (5 ft 9 in)
- Position: Midfielder

Youth career
- 1995–1998: Carcavelos
- 1998–2003: Sporting CP
- 2003–2005: Belenenses

Senior career*
Years	Team	Apps	(Gls)
2004	Belenenses	1	(1)
2005–2008	Olivais Moscavide	73	(10)
2008–2009	Gloria Buzău	16	(0)
2009–2012	Ayia Napa	53	(5)
2012–2013	Benfica Macau	11	(3)
2013–2014	Onisilos Sotira	11	(0)
2015–2016	Sporting de Macau	17	(2)
Total		182	(21)

International career
2004	Portugal U18	5	(0)
- * Club domestic league appearances and goals

Jorge Humberto Pinto Tavares (born 22 April 1986 in Oeiras, Lisbon District) is a Portuguese former footballer who played as a midfielder.

== Career ==
Tavares played in three clubs in the Lisbon District in his youth, the last being C.F. Os Belenenses. On 22 November 2004, still a junior, he made his debut with the first team, playing 27 minutes in a top division match against Académica de Coimbra, and scoring in a 1–1 away draw.

In the following three seasons, Tavares played with another team in the region, C.D. Olivais e Moscavide, helping to promotion to the second level in his first year but being relegated in his second. After one more season, the 22-year-old moved abroad, signing for FC Gloria Buzău in Romania.
