= Edwin Ouon =

Rwandan former professional footballer (born 1981)

Personal information
- Full name: Edwin Ouon
- Date of birth: 26 January 1981 (age 45)
- Place of birth: Aubervilliers, France
- Height: 1.87 m (6 ft 2 in)
- Positions: Centre-back; right-back

Senior career*
| Years | Team | Apps | (Gls) |
| 2000–2001 | Red Star Saint-Ouen | 0 | (0) |
| 2001–2002 | Cagliari | 0 | (0) |
| 2002–2005 | Royal Antwerp | 64 | (0) |
| 2005–2006 | Oostende | 11 | (1) |
| 2006 | Germinal Beerschot | 6 | (0) |
| 2006–2007 | Mazarrón | 10 | (1) |
| 2007–2008 | Aris Limassol | 22 | (0) |
| 2008–2014 | AEL Limassol | 135 | (3) |
| 2014–2015 | Ermis Aradippou | 16 | (0) |
| 2015 | Apollon Limassol | 10 | (0) |
| 2015–2017 | Levadiakos | 46 | (1) |

International career
| 2009–2014 | Rwanda | 3 | (0) |
- * Club domestic league appearances and goals

Edwin Ouon (born 26 January 1981) is a Rwandan former professional footballer who played as a defender. He was regarded as one of the best centre backs in the Cypriot First Division league, having won the 'Defender of the year' prize in the 2008–09 season.

== Club career ==
Ouon was born in Aubervilliers, France.

In 2008, he signed for AEL Limassol. In the 2011–12 season he was one of the key players helping the team win the Cypriot First Division. The 2012–13 season started very well for Ouon and he participated in UEFA Europa League.

== Honours ==
AEL Limassol

- Cypriot First Division: 2011–12
