= Tasos Markou Stadium =

Multi-purpose stadium in Paralimni, Cyprus

Coordinates: 35°1′51″N 33°59′14″E

- Τάσος Μάρκου
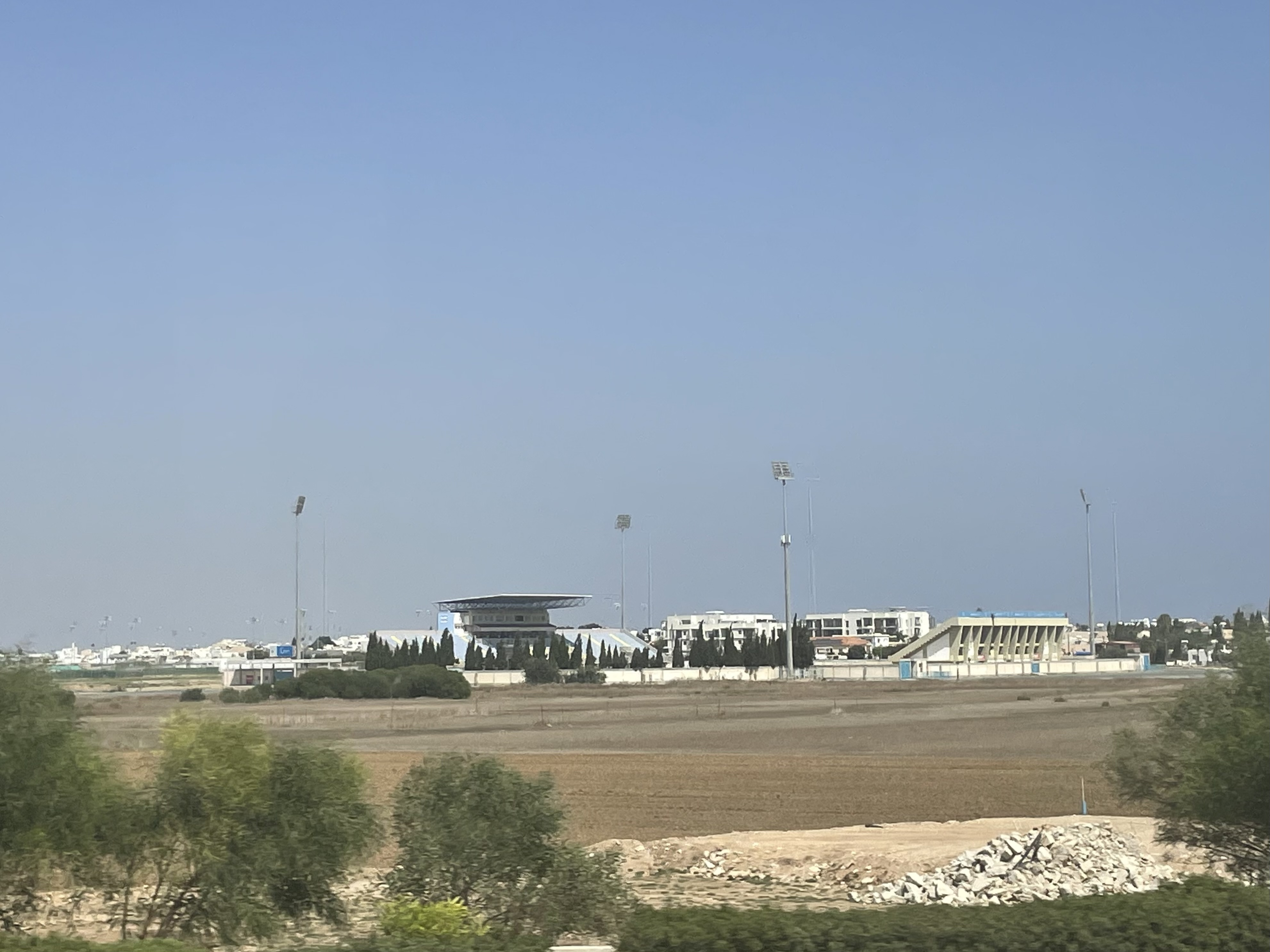
- Interactive map of Tasos Markou Stadium
- Full name: Paralimni Municipal Stadium "Tasos Markou"
- Location: Paralimni, Cyprus
- Capacity: 5,800

Construction
- Built: 1996
- Opened: 1996

Tenants
- Enosis Neon Paralimni (1996–present); Anagennisi Dherynia (2011–2012, 2016–2017); AO Ayia Napa (2012–2013) (2014–2016) (2020–); UEFA U-17 Championship (2024)

Tasos Markou Stadium is a multi-purpose stadium in Paralimni, Cyprus.

It was inaugurated in 1996 and currently used mostly for football matches. It is the home ground of Enosis Neon Paralimni. The stadium holds 5,800 people.
