= 2012–13 Cypriot First Division =

Cypriot First Division
- Season: 2012–13
- Champions: APOEL; 22nd title
- Relegated: Olympiakos; Ayia Napa; AEP
- Champions League: APOEL
- Europa League: Anorthosis; Omonia; Apollon
- Matches: 218
- Goals: 592 (2.72 per match)
- Top goalscorer: Bernardo Vasconcelos (18 goals)
- Biggest home win: APOEL 6–0 AEP (17 March 2013); Omonia 6–0 Nea Salamina (30 March 2013)
- Biggest away win: Enosis 0–5 APOEL (3 September 2012); AEP 0–5 Olympiakos (30 March 2013)
- Highest scoring: Alki 6–5 Ethnikos (30 March 2013)
- Longest winning run: 9 games Anorthosis; Omonia
- Longest unbeaten run: 20 games Anorthosis
- Longest winless run: 16 games Ethnikos
- Longest losing run: 9 games AEP

The 2012–13 Cypriot First Division was the 74th season of the Cypriot top-level football league. It began on 1 September 2012 and ended on 19 May 2013. AEL Limassol were the defending champions. APOEL won the championship two matchweeks before the end of the season.

The league comprise eleven teams from the 2011–12 season and three promoted teams from the 2011–12 Second Division.

== Teams ==
Ermis Aradippou and Anagennisi Dherynia were relegated at the end of the first stage of the 2011–12 season after finishing in the bottom two places of the table. They were joined by Aris Limassol, who finished at the bottom of the second-phase Group C.

The relegated teams were replaced by 2011–12 Second Division champions Doxa Katokopias, runners-up Ayia Napa and third-placed team AEP Paphos.

Location of teams in 2012–13 Cypriot First Division

Club	Location	Venue	Capacity
AEK	Larnaca	Neo GSZ Stadium	13,032
AEL	Limassol	Tsirion Stadium	13,331
AEP	Paphos	Pafiako Stadium	9,394
Alki	Larnaca	Neo GSZ Stadium	13,032
Anorthosis	Larnaca	Antonis Papadopoulos Stadium	10,230
APOEL	Nicosia	GSP Stadium	22,859
Apollon	Limassol	Tsirion Stadium	13,331
Ayia Napa	Ayia Napa	Tasos Marcou Stadium	5,800
Doxa	Katokopia	Ammochostos Stadium	5,500
Enosis	Paralimni	Tasos Marcou Stadium	5,800
Ethnikos	Achna, Famagusta	Dasaki Stadium	7,000
Nea Salamina	Larnaca	Ammochostos Stadium	5,500
Olympiakos	Nicosia	GSP Stadium	22,859
Omonia	Nicosia	GSP Stadium	22,859

=== Personnel and kits ===
Note: Flags indicate national team as has been defined under FIFA eligibility rules. Players and Managers may hold more than one non-FIFA nationality.

Team	Head coach	Captain	Kit manufacturer	Shirt sponsor
AEK	(Israel) Ran Ben Shimon	(Spain) Ander Murillo	Puma	Cytavision
AEL	(Portugal) Jorge Costa	(Cyprus) Marios Nicolaou	Puma	Cytavision
AEP	(Serbia) Saša Jovanović	(Cyprus) Alexandros Garpozis	Givova	Skycore
Alki	(Cyprus) Kostas Kaiafas	(Argentina) Emiliano Fusco	Joma	Cyta
Anorthosis	(Cyprus) Pambos Christodoulou	(Cyprus) Ioannis Okkas	Puma	Cytamobile-Vodafone
APOEL	(Serbia) Ivan Jovanović	(Cyprus) Marinos Satsias	Puma	MTN
Apollon	(Cyprus) Christakis Christoforou	(Cyprus) Giorgos Merkis	Macron	Cyta
Ayia Napa	(Cyprus) Costas Loizou	(Cyprus) Martinos Solomou	Givova	Ayia Napa Municipality
Doxa	(Cyprus) Loukas Hadjiloukas	(Portugal) Ricardo Fernandes	Givova	Cytanet
Enosis	(Cyprus) Marios Karas	(Cyprus) Demos Goumenos	Nike	Cyta
Ethnikos	(Greece) Nikos Kolompourdas	(Cyprus) Christos Poyiatzis	Legea	Cyta
Nea Salamina	(North Macedonia) Mirsad Jonuz	(Cyprus) Prodromos Therapontos	Givova	Cytamobile-Vodafone
Olympiakos	(Cyprus) Marios Constantinou	(Cyprus) Nikolas Nicolaou	Givova	Cyta
Omonia	(North Macedonia) Toni Savevski	(Hungary) Leandro	Nike	Cytamobile-Vodafone

=== Managerial changes ===
Team	Outgoing manager	Manner of departure	Date of vacancy	Position in table	Incoming manager	Date of appointment
Omonia	(Cyprus) Neophytos Larkou	Mutual consent	18 September 2012	4th	(North Macedonia) Toni Savevski	26 September 2012
Apollon	(Scotland) George Burley	Sacked	19 September 2012	6th	(Cyprus) Nikodimos Papavasiliou	20 September 2012
Olympiakos	(Cyprus) Nikodimos Papavasiliou	Signed by Apollon	20 September 2012	7th	(Cyprus) Renos Demetriades	25 September 2012
Enosis	(Cyprus) Zouvanis Zouvani	Resigned	24 September 2012	9th	(Netherlands) Ton Caanen	3 October 2012
Ethnikos	(Greece) Nicos Papadopoulos	Mutual consent	8 October 2012	12th	(Cyprus) Nikos Andronikou	14 October 2012
AEL	(Cyprus) Pambos Christodoulou	Mutual consent	22 October 2012	4th	(Portugal) Jorge Costa	23 October 2012
Doxa	(Cyprus) Marios Constantinou	Resigned	1 November 2012	14th	(Cyprus) Loukas Hadjiloukas	1 November 2012
AEP	(Greece) Ioannis Topalidis	Mutual consent	5 November 2012	9th	(Portugal) Horácio Gonçalves	8 November 2012
Nea Salamina	(Cyprus) Nicos Andreou	Resigned	18 November 2012	10th	(North Macedonia) Mirsad Jonuz	21 November 2012
AEP	(Portugal) Horácio Gonçalves	Resigned	22 November 2012	14th	(Serbia) Saša Jovanović	26 November 2012
Alki	(Cyprus) Kostas Kaiafas	Resigned	2 December 2012	12th	(Cyprus) Neophytos Larkou	5 December 2012
Ethnikos	(Cyprus) Nikos Andronikou	Mutual consent	3 December 2012	13th	(Cyprus) Stephen Constantine	5 December 2012
Ayia Napa	(Cyprus) Nicos Nicolaou	Mutual consent	10 January 2013	13th	(Greece) Nikos Kolompourdas	16 January 2013
Olympiakos	(Cyprus) Renos Demetriades	Sacked	10 February 2013	10th	(Cyprus) Marios Constantinou	11 February 2013
Ethnikos	(Cyprus) Stephen Constantine	Sacked	25 February 2013	11th	(Greece) Nikos Kolompourdas	26 February 2013
Ayia Napa	(Greece) Nikos Kolompourdas	Signed by Ethnikos	25 February 2013	13th	(Cyprus) Costas Loizou	25 February 2013
Apollon	(Cyprus) Nikodimos Papavasiliou	Sacked	8 March 2013	6th	(Cyprus) Christakis Christoforou	12 March 2013
Anorthosis	(Israel) Ronny Levy	Sacked	1 April 2013	2nd	(Cyprus) Pambos Christodoulou	2 April 2013
Alki	(Cyprus) Neophytos Larkou	Resigned	9 April 2013	9th	(Cyprus) Kostas Kaiafas	9 April 2013
Enosis	(Netherlands) Ton Caanen	Mutual consent	13 April 2013	8th	(Cyprus) Marios Karas	16 April 2013

== First phase ==
=== League table ===
Pos	Team	Pld	W	D	L	GF	GA	GD	Pts	Qualification or relegation
1	APOEL	26	21	3	2	56	10	+46	66	Qualification for second round, Group A
2	Anorthosis Famagusta	26	18	6	2	57	21	+36	60	Qualification for second round, Group A
3	AEK Larnaca	26	17	4	5	50	21	+29	55	Qualification for second round, Group A
4	Omonia Nicosia	26	16	5	5	51	22	+29	53	Qualification for second round, Group A
5	AEL Limassol	26	14	9	3	46	26	+20	51	Qualification for second round, Group B
6	Apollon Limassol	26	11	7	8	32	24	+8	40	Qualification for second round, Group B
7	Doxa Katokopias	26	8	6	12	26	40	−14	30	Qualification for second round, Group B
8	Enosis Neon Paralimni	26	6	10	10	23	35	−12	28	Qualification for second round, Group B
9	Alki Larnaca	26	6	7	13	33	46	−13	25	Qualification for second round, Group C
10	Olympiakos Nicosia (Note: On 22 May 2012, Olympiakos Nicosia were deducted three points by CFA because they failed to meet the financial criteria.)	26	6	9	11	36	44	−8	24	Qualification for second round, Group C
11	Nea Salamis Famagusta	26	6	5	15	18	36	−18	23	Qualification for second round, Group C
12	Ethnikos Achna	26	4	10	12	28	40	−12	22	Qualification for second round, Group C
13	Ayia Napa (R)	26	2	2	22	15	59	−44	8	Relegation to Cypriot B1 Division
14	AEP Paphos (Note: On 11 June 2012, AEP Paphos were deducted three points by CFA because they failed to meet the financial criteria. On 13 August 2012, AEP Paphos were deducted another three points by CFA because they failed again to meet the financial criteria. On 12 November 2012, AEP Paphos were deducted another three points by CFA because they failed to meet the financial criteria for the third time. On 13 May 2012, AEP Paphos were deducted another three points because of FIFA decision.) (R)	26	4	3	19	17	64	−47	3	Relegation to Cypriot B1 Division

Source: CFA
Rules for classification: 1) points; 2) head-to-head points; 3) head-to-head goal difference; 4) head-to-head away goals scored; 5) goal difference; 6) number of goals scored
(R) Relegated

=== Results ===
Home \ Away	AEK	AEL	AEP	ALK	ANO	APOE	APOL	AYN	DOX	ENP	ETH	NSL	OLY	OMO
AEK Larnaca		1–2	4–0	2–0	2–3	0–1	2–0	3–0	1–2	5–0	2–1	1–2	1–0	2–1
AEL Limassol	2–2		4–0	3–1	1–1	1–3	3–2	2–0	2–0	1–1	1–1	2–1	1–1	1–1
AEP Paphos	0–3	1–3		1–4	0–2	0–2	0–1	3–0	0–4	0–1	0–0	1–0	0–5	1–2
Alki Larnaca	0–1	2–3	0–2		0–3	1–3	1–3	0–2	2–2	1–1	6–5	1–0	0–0	2–4
Anorthosis Famagusta	1–1	1–1	5–1	3–0		0–2	0–0	5–1	3–0	1–1	5–1	1–0	4–3	2–0
APOEL	1–2	2–0	6–0	1–1	0–1		1–0	4–1	3–1	1–0	1–0	2–0	4–0	1–1
Apollon Limassol	1–2	0–0	4–0	2–1	0–2	1–2		2–1	1–0	0–0	2–0	3–1	1–1	2–1
Ayia Napa	1–1	0–4	1–2	0–3	0–1	0–2	0–1		0–2	1–4	1–0	1–2	1–1	0–3
Doxa Katokopias	2–6	1–3	1–0	0–1	0–2	0–3	0–0	2–1		1–1	1–1	1–0	1–1	1–1
Enosis Neon Paralimni	1–2	1–2	1–1	1–1	1–2	0–5	0–3	1–0	1–0		1–1	0–0	1–2	0–1
Ethnikos Achna	0–1	1–3	3–0	0–2	2–2	0–1	1–1	2–1	3–1	0–0		1–1	1–1	1–1
Nea Salamis Famagusta	0–0	0–1	1–1	1–1	2–1	0–3	2–0	1–0	0–1	0–2	0–1		3–2	0–1
Olympiakos Nicosia	0–2	0–0	3–1	2–2	1–3	0–2	1–1	3–2	1–2	2–3	3–1	2–1		1–4
Omonia Nicosia	0–1	2–0	4–2	1–0	1–3	0–0	2–1	5–0	3–0	2–0	2–1	6–0	2–0	

Source: CFA
Legend: Blue = home team win; Yellow = draw; Red = away team win.

== Second round ==
=== Group A ===
==== Table ====
Pos	Team	Pld	W	D	L	GF	GA	GD	Pts	Qualification
1	APOEL (C)	32	23	4	5	62	19	+43	73	Qualification for Champions League third qualifying round
2	Anorthosis Famagusta	32	20	8	4	60	29	+31	68	Qualification for Europa League second qualifying round
3	Omonia Nicosia	32	20	6	6	66	27	+39	66	Qualification for Europa League second qualifying round
4	AEK Larnaca	32	19	4	9	55	28	+27	61	

Source: UEFA
Rules for classification: 1) points; 2) head-to-head points; 3) head-to-head goal difference; 4) head-to-head goals scored; 5) goal difference; 6) number of goals scored.
(C) Champions

==== Results ====
Home \ Away	AEK	ANO	APOE	OMO
AEK Larnaca		0–1	0–1	0–2
Anorthosis Famagusta	0–3		2–1	0–0
APOEL	0–1	0–0		4–3
Omonia Nicosia	3–1	4–0	3–0	

Source: UEFA
Legend: Blue = home team win; Yellow = draw; Red = away team win.

=== Group B ===
==== Table ====
Pos	Team	Pld	W	D	L	GF	GA	GD	Pts	Qualification
5	AEL Limassol	32	18	10	4	59	31	+28	64	
6	Apollon Limassol	32	13	9	10	40	31	+9	48	Qualification for Europa League play-off round (Note: Apollon Limassol qualified for the play-off round of the 2013–14 UEFA Europa League after winning the 2012–13 Cypriot Cup.)
7	Doxa Katokopias	32	10	9	13	33	47	−14	39	
8	Enosis Neon Paralimni	32	7	10	15	28	49	−21	31	

Source: UEFA
Rules for classification: 1) points; 2) head-to-head points; 3) head-to-head goal difference; 4) head-to-head goals scored; 5) goal difference; 6) number of goals scored.

==== Results ====
Home \ Away	AEL	APOL	DOX	ENP
AEL Limassol		2–1	3–0	3–0
Apollon Limassol	1–3		0–0	4–1
Doxa Katokopias	1–1	1–1		1–0
Enosis Neon Paralimni	2–1	0–1	2–4	

Source: UEFA
Legend: Blue = home team win; Yellow = draw; Red = away team win.

=== Group C ===
==== Table ====
Pos	Team	Pld	W	D	L	GF	GA	GD	Pts	Qualification or relegation
9	Ethnikos Achna	32	7	12	13	41	50	−9	33	
10	Alki Larnaca	32	8	8	16	43	58	−15	32	
11	Nea Salamis Famagusta (O)	32	8	7	17	27	44	−17	31	Qualification for Relegation play-offs
12	Olympiakos Nicosia (Note: On 22 May 2012, Olympiakos Nicosia were deducted three points by CFA because they failed to meet the financial criteria.) (R)	32	8	10	14	46	56	−10	31 (Note: SAL: 7 pts; OLY: 4 pts)	Relegation to Cypriot B1 Division

Source: UEFA
Rules for classification: 1) points; 2) head-to-head points; 3) head-to-head goal difference; 4) head-to-head goals scored; 5) goal difference; 6) number of goals scored.
(O) Play-off winners; (R) Relegated

==== Results ====
Home \ Away	ALK	ETH	NSL	OLY
Alki Larnaca		1–3	1–2	2–1
Ethnikos Achna	1–1		2–2	3–1
Nea Salamis Famagusta	1–3	1–2		3–0
Olympiakos Nicosia	4–2	4–2	0–0	

Source: UEFA
Legend: Blue = home team win; Yellow = draw; Red = away team win.

=== Relegation play-offs ===
The 11th-placed team Nea Salamina faced 4th-placed 2012–13 Cypriot Second Division side Anagennisi Dherynia, in a single-legged play-off for one spot in the 2013–14 Cypriot First Division. The match was held at Antonis Papadopoulos Stadium on 23 May 2013 and Nea Salamina won by 3–0, retaining its Cypriot First Division spot for the 2013–14 season.

23 May 2013
17:00 EEST

Nea Salamina	3 – 0	Anagennisi Dherynia
Alimi 17', 66'; Roque 58'	Report

Antonis Papadopoulos Stadium, Larnaca
Attendance: 800
Referee: Vasilis Demetriou

== Season statistics ==
=== Top scorers ===
Including matches played on 19 May 2013; Source: Cyprus Football Association

Rank	Player	Club	Goals
1	(Portugal) Bernardo Vasconcelos	Alki	18
2	(Brazil) Andre Alves	Omonia	16
3	(Portugal) Marco Paixão	Ethnikos	15
4	(Brazil) Juliano Spadacio	Anorthosis	14
5	(Paraguay) Aldo Adorno	APOEL	13
5	(Portugal) Henrique	Olympiakos	13
5	(Israel) Barak Itzhaki	Anorthosis	13
8	(Brazil) Gustavo Manduca	APOEL	12
8	(Czech Republic) Jan Rezek	Anorthosis	12
10	(Netherlands) Nassir Maachi	AEK Larnaca	11
10	(Ivory Coast) Patrick Vouho	AEL	11

=== Hat-tricks ===
#	Player	For	Against	Result	Date
1.	(Paraguay) Aldo Adorno	APOEL	Enosis	0–5	3 September 2012
2.	(Paraguay) Aldo Adorno	APOEL	Ayia Napa	4–1	5 November 2012
3.	(Israel) Barak Itzhaki	Anorthosis	Olympiakos	4–3	3 February 2013
4.	(Brazil) Andre Alves	Omonia	Olympiakos	1–4	16 March 2013
5.	(Argentina) Esteban Solari	Apollon	Enosis	4–1	20 April 2013
6.	(Ivory Coast) Gaossou Fofana	Doxa	Enosis	2–4	18 May 2013

=== Scoring ===
- First goal of the season: 25 minutes – (Brazil) Juliano Spadacio (Anorthosis) against AEP Paphos (19:25 EET, 1 September 2012)
- Fastest goal of the season: 15 seconds – (Croatia) Mario Budimir (APOEL) against Alki (22 September 2012)
- Latest goal of the season: 102 minutes and 23 seconds – (Czech Republic) Jan Rezek (Anorthosis) against Omonia (21 October 2012)
- First own goal of the season: 49 minutes – (Portugal) Fabeta (Ayia Napa) for Omonia (20:04 EET, 2 September 2012)
- First scored penalty kick of the season: 84 minutes – (Angola) Freddy (Omonia) against Ayia Napa (20:39 EET, 2 September 2012)
- Most scored goals in a single fixture – 38 goals (Fixture 26)
  - Fixture 26 results: Enosis 1–2 AEL, AEP Paphos 0–5 Olympiakos, Omonia 6–0 Nea Salamina, Alki 6–5 Ethnikos, Apollon 2–1 Ayia Napa, Doxa 2–6 AEK, Anorthosis 0–2 APOEL.
- Highest scoring game: 11 goals
  - Alki 6–5 Ethnikos (30 March 2013)
- Largest winning margin: 6 goals
  - APOEL 6–0 AEP Paphos (17 March 2013)
  - Omonia 6–0 Nea Salamina (30 March 2013)
- Most goals scored in a match by a single team: 6 goals
  - APOEL 6–0 AEP Paphos (17 March 2013)
  - Omonia 6–0 Nea Salamina (30 March 2013)
  - Alki 6–5 Ethnikos (30 March 2013)
  - Doxa 2–6 AEK (31 March 2013)
- Most goals scored by a losing team: 5 goals
  - Alki 6–5 Ethnikos (30 March 2013)

=== Discipline ===
- First yellow card of the season: (Senegal) Gora Tall for AEP Paphos against Anorthosis, 15 minutes (19:15 EET, 1 September 2012)
- First red card of the season: (Cyprus) Kyriacos Polykarpou for Olympiakos against Nea Salamina, 37 minutes (20:37 EET, 1 September 2012)
- Most yellow cards in a single match: 13
  - Anorthosis 1–1 AEL – 6 for Anorthosis (Dan Alexa, Paulo Jorge, Valentinos Sielis (2), Jurgen Colin, Giannis Skopelitis) and 7 for AEL (Dosa Júnior, Marco Airosa, Luciano Bebê, Carlitos, Dédé (2), Ebo Andoh) (1 December 2012)
- Most red cards in a single match: 3
  - AEL 3–2 Apollon – 1 for AEL (Edwin Ouon) and 2 for Apollon (Sebastián Setti, Giorgos Vasiliou) (5 January 2013)

== Attendances ==
#	Club	Average
1	APOEL	8,905
2	Omonoia	6,824
3	Anorthosis	5,469
4	AEL	4,331
5	Apollon Limassol	3,850
6	AEK Larnaca	3,490
7	Nea Salamina	1,334
8	Alki	1,033
9	Ethnikos Achnas	1,010
10	Olympiakos Nicosia	974
11	Paphos	917
12	Doxa Katokopias	831
13	Ayia Napa	632
14	ENP	579

== Sources ==
- "2012/13 Cypriot First Division". Rec.Sport.Soccer Statistics Foundation. 2016-01-14.
