= 2009–10 APOEL FC season =

APOEL
2009–10 season
- Chairman: Phivos Erotokritou
- Manager: Ivan Jovanović
- Stadium: GSP Stadium, Nicosia
- Cypriot First Division: 2nd
- Cypriot Cup: Runners-up
- LTV Super Cup: Winners
- Champions League: Group stage
- Top goalscorer: League: Nenad Mirosavljević (11); All: Nenad Mirosavljević (21)
- Highest home attendance: 21,657 vs Chelsea (30 September 2009)
- Lowest home attendance: 1,880 vs Apollon Limassol (8 May 2010)
- Average home league attendance: 9,799 (all competitions)
Home colours	Away colours	Third colours

The 2009–10 season was APOEL's 70th season in the Cypriot First Division and 82nd year in existence as a football club.

== Season review ==
=== Pre-season and friendlies ===
The first training session for the season took place on June 10, 2009, at the GSP Stadium and on June 21, the team left to Obertraun in Austria, to perform the main stage of their pre-season training. On July 3, the team moved to Leogang to continue their pre-season preparation. APOEL returned to Cyprus on July 9. During the pre-season training stage in Austria, APOEL played three friendly matches.

=== Domestic Competitions ===
==== LTV Super Cup ====
APOEL started the season by winning the 2009 Cypriot Super Cup, beating APOP Kinyras 2–1 on 9 August 2009. Sebastián González opened the score for APOP Kinyras in the 4th minute and APOEL equalised with Boban Grnčarov in the 49th minute. The winner came from Nektarios Alexandrou in the 85th minute.

==== Marfin Laiki League ====
APOEL finished 2nd in the 2009–10 Cypriot First Division with 65 points, behind champions Omonia which had 74 points. So, APOEL won a place for the 2010–11 UEFA Europa League second qualifying round.

==== Cypriot Cup ====
APOEL reached the final of the 2009–10 Cypriot Cup by eliminating Ethnikos Achna (4–2 agg.), Ermis Aradippou (6–0 agg.) and Aris Limassol (2–0 agg.). In the Cup final which held at GSZ Stadium on 15 May 2010, APOEL lost from Apollon Limassol by 2–1. Apollon took the lead in the 1st minute with a goal from Moustapha Bangura and APOEL equalised in the 23rd minute with a header from Marcin Żewłakow. Apollon scored the winner with Giorgos Merkis in the 72nd minute with a header from close range.

=== UEFA Champions League ===

APOEL's 2009–10 UEFA Champions League lineup that drew 2–2 with Chelsea at Stamford Bridge.

The team was the current holders of the Cypriot championship and as such entered the UEFA Champions League qualifying stages. A successful campaign saw them through to the 2009–10 UEFA Champions League group stages by eliminating EB/Streymur (5–0 agg.), FK Partizan (2–1 agg.) and F.C. Copenhagen (3–2 agg.). APOEL were drawn in Group D against Chelsea F.C., F.C. Porto and Atlético Madrid.

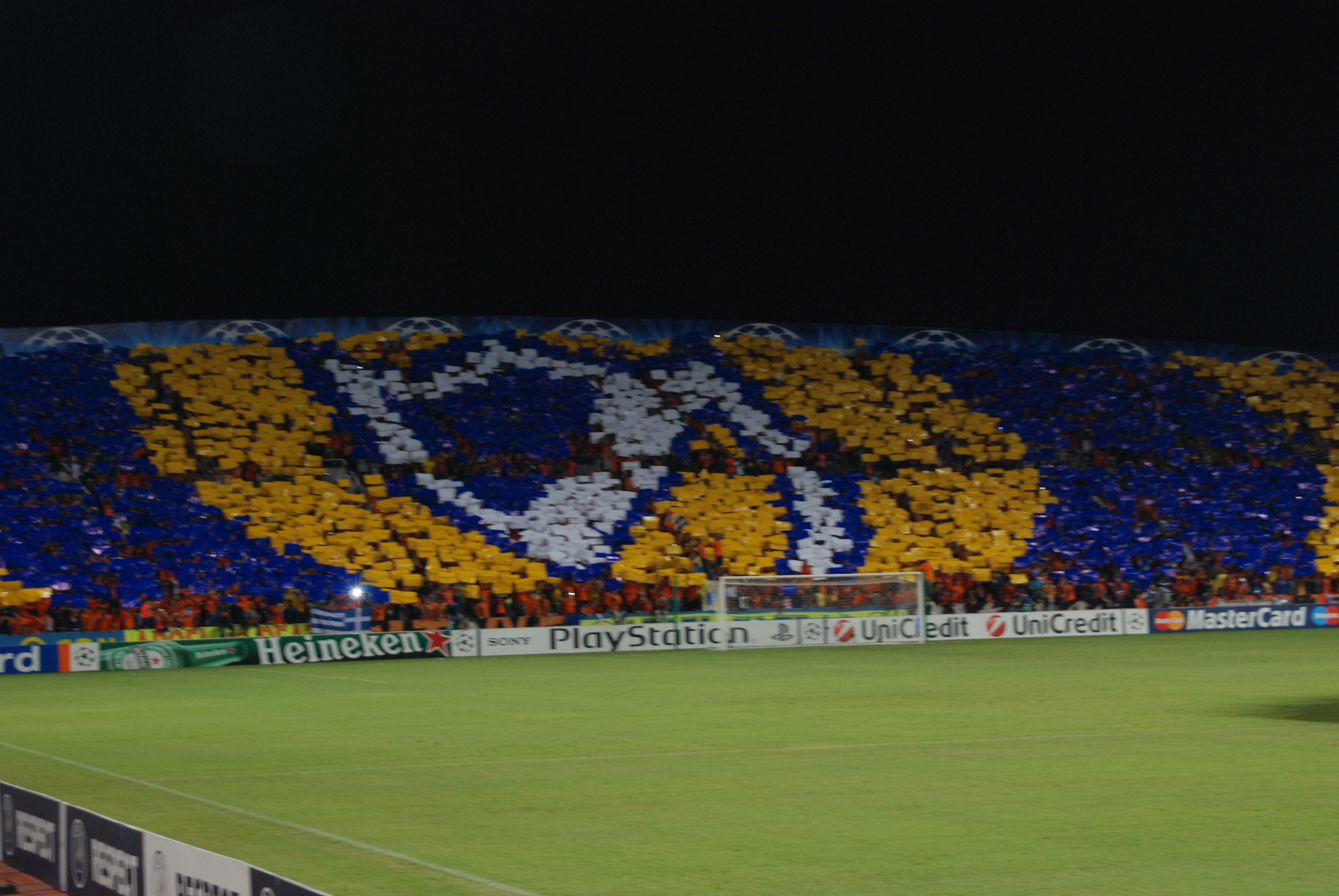
The choreography displayed by APOEL fans in the match against Chelsea to celebrate their first ever home UEFA Champions League group stage match.

On matchday 1, APOEL drew 0–0 against Atlético Madrid at the first game at Vicente Calderón Stadium and won its first ever point in group stages. On matchday 2, APOEL faced up English giants Chelsea F.C. and the Cypriot team was beaten 0–1 by Nicolas Anelka's goal in the 18th minute. On matchday 3, APOEL played against F.C. Porto at Dragão. APOEL took the lead on 22’ from Álvaro Pereira's own goal but Hulk scored two goals on 33’ and 48’ with a penalty and finally lost 2–1. Then followed another match against F.C. Porto in Nicosia for matchday 4. APOEL stood well but lost 1–0 after Radamel Falcao's goal in the 84th minute. On matchday 5, APOEL drew 1–1 with Atlético Madrid at GSP Stadium. APOEL took the lead in the game in the 5th minute after Nenad Mirosavljević scored, but Atlético Madrid equalised with the Portuguese international Simão Sabrosa on 62 minutes. For matchday 6, on December 8, 2009, APOEL travelled to London to play against Chelsea F.C. At Stamford Bridge the team had the support of 6,000 fans who traveled from Cyprus. APOEL took the lead on 6th minute with Marcin Żewłakow, but Chelsea scored two goals with Michael Essien on 19’ and Didier Drogba on 26' to make it 2–1. APOEL equalised after Nenad Mirosavljević scored in the 87th minute and the match ended 2–2.

APOEL finished fourth in the group having equal points with Atlético Madrid, but failed to qualify to UEFA Europa League, because of the away goal that Atlético Madrid had scored in Nicosia. At the end of the season Atlético became the eventual winner of the 2009–10 UEFA Europa League.

== Current squad ==
Last Update: February 13, 2010

Note: Flags indicate national team as defined under FIFA eligibility rules; some limited exceptions apply. Players may hold more than one non-FIFA nationality.

No.	Pos.	Nation	Player
1	GK	CYP	Michalis Morfis
3	DF	POR	Paulo Jorge
4	DF	CYP	Andreas Charalambous
5	DF	MKD	Boban Grnčarov
7	DF	GRE	Savvas Poursaitidis
8	FW	POL	Adrian Sikora
9	FW	CYP	Andreas Papathanasiou
10	MF	CYP	Constantinos Charalambides
11	MF	POL	Kamil Kosowski
12	MF	CYP	Emilios Panayiotou
14	DF	NED	Joost Broerse
15	DF	CYP	Marios Antoniades
17	MF	CYP	Marinos Satsias (captain)
18	MF	CYP	Achilleas Vasiliou
19	DF	CYP	Marios Elia
20	MF	BRA	Jean Paulista
21	FW	POL	Marcin Żewłakow

No.	Pos.	Nation	Player
22	GK	GRE	Dionisis Chiotis
23	MF	POR	Helio Pinto
24	DF	GRE	Christos Kontis
26	MF	POR	Nuno Morais
29	MF	CYP	Nektarios Alexandrou
30	FW	SRB	Nenad Mirosavljević
31	GK	CYP	Sofronis Avgousti
32	DF	ALB	Altin Haxhi
33	MF	CYP	Chrysis Michael
37	FW	SVK	Mário Breška
44	DF	GRE	Vangelis Koutsopoulos
60	GK	CYP	Kyriacos Ioannou
71	MF	CYP	Marios Theodorou
77	DF	CYP	Athos Solomou
81	MF	BRA	Marcinho
88	GK	CYP	Tasos Kissas

For recent transfers, see List of Cypriot football transfers summer 2009.
Also, see List of Cypriot football transfers winter 2009–10.

=== Squad changes ===
In:

No.	Pos.	Nat.	Name	Age	EU	Moving from	Type	Transfer window	Ends	Transfer fee	Source
9	CF	(Cyprus)	Papathanasiou	25	EU	Ermis Aradippou	Loan Return →	Summer	2010	—	—
37	RW	(Slovakia)	Breška	29	EU	1. FC Nürnberg (Germany)	Transfer ✓	Summer	2011	€100K	apoelfc.com.cy
5	CB	(North Macedonia)	Grnčarov	26	Non-EU	Gent (Belgium)	Transfer ✓	Summer	2011	Free	apoelfc.com.cy
3	CB	(Portugal)	Paulo Jorge	28	EU	Braga (Portugal)	Transfer ✓	Summer	2011	Free	apoelfc.com.cy
8	CF	(Poland)	Sikora	29	EU	Murcia (Spain)	Transfer ✓	Summer	2011	Free	apoelfc.com.cy
77	RM	(Cyprus)	Solomou	23	EU	Apollon Limassol	Transfer ✓	Summer	2012	€75K	apoelfc.com.cy
31	GK	(Cyprus)	Avgousti	32	EU	Aris Limassol	Transfer ✓	Winter	2010	Free	—
44	LB	(Greece)	Koutsopoulos	29	EU	Atromitos (Greece)	Transfer ✓	Winter	2011	Free	apoelfc.com.cy
81	AM	(Brazil)	Marcinho	28	Non-EU	Marítimo (Portugal)	Transfer ✓	Winter	2012	€210K	apoelfc.com.cy

Total expenditure: ▼€385K

Out:

No.	Pos.	Nat.	Name	Age	EU	Moving to	Type	Transfer window	Transfer fee	Source
4	CB	(Cyprus)	Christou	25	EU	Omonia Nicosia	CFA DRC decision ✗	Summer	€80K	apoelfc.com.cy
5	LB	(Romania)	Florea	33	EU	Dunărea Galați (Romania)	End of contract ✗	Summer	Free	apoelfc.com.cy
8	CB	(France)	Seghiri	30	EU	Panserraikos (Greece)	End of contract ✗	Summer	Free	apoelfc.com.cy
80	CF	(Nigeria)	Onwuachi	25	Non-EU	Ionikos (Greece)	Loan Return →	Summer	—	—
77	RB	(Cyprus)	Panayiotou	20	EU	Digenis Morphou	Loan →	Summer	Free	Sigma Live
40	DM	(Cyprus)	Economides	19	EU	Digenis Morphou	Loan →	Summer	Free	Sigma Live
6	DM	(Cyprus)	Kyriakou	23	EU	Olympiakos Nicosia	Loan →	Winter	Free	Sigma Live

Total income: ▲€80K

Last updated: February 2, 2010

== Squad stats ==
				Total						Marfin Laiki League 2009-10					Cypriot Cup					UEFA Champions League					LTV Super Cup				
Country	N	P	Name	GS	A	Mins.	Gls.	Y	R	A	Mins.	Gls.	Y	R	A	Mins.	Gls.	Y	R	A	Mins.	Gls.	Y	R	A	Mins.	Gls.	Y	R
(Cyprus)	1	GK	Morfis	1	1	90				1	90																		
(Portugal)	3	CB	Paulo Jorge	20	23	1676	2	5		13	939	1	4		3	241	1			6	406		1		1	90			
(North Macedonia)	5	CB	Grnčarov	22	29	2094	3	7		17	1196	2	4		4	360		1		7	448		2		1	90	1		
(Greece)	7	RB	Poursaitides	38	38	3404		6		24	2119				4	385		2		9	810		4		1	90			
(Poland)	8	CF	Sikora	3	5	216	2			3	128	2								1	24				1	64			
(Cyprus)	9	CF	Papathanasiou	4	23	817	3			15	650	3			4	121				3	34				1	12			
(Cyprus)	10	RM	Charalambides	35	44	3093	11	5	1	27	1767	9	3	1	7	493	2	1		10	833		1						
(Poland)	11	LM	Kosowski	33	35	2731	4			20	1599	2			5	396	1			10	736	1							
(Cyprus)	12	AM	Panayiotou		1	18									1	18													
(Netherlands)	14	CB	Broerse	26	33	2431		8	1	19	1246		5		4	357				9	738		3	1	1	90			
(Cyprus)	15	LB	Antoniades		1	31									1	31													
(Cyprus)	17	DM	Satsias	18	23	1392		4		13	797		1		2	132				8	463		3						
(Cyprus)	19	RB	Elia	22	26	1989		6		16	1335		5		3	111				6	453		1		1	90			
(Brazil)	20	SS	Paulista	10	28	1147	2	2		18	785	2	2		5	240				4	96				1	26			
(Poland)	21	CF	Żewłakow	25	33	2038	8	3		19	1170	3	1		5	413	1	1		9	455	4	1						
(Greece)	22	GK	Chiotis	39	39	3497		4		23	2057		4		4	360				12	1080								
(Portugal)	23	AM	Pinto	34	45	3318	3	6		25	1818	1	4		7	619	2			12	836		2		1	45			
(Greece)	24	CB	Kontis	43	43	3814	2	3		27	2367	2	2		6	550				10	897		1						
(Portugal)	26	CM	Morais	44	46	3983	1	7		29	2433	1	5		5	480		2		11	980				1	90			
(Cyprus)	29	LM	Alexandrou	21	36	1903	3	5		23	1374	1	3		3	109				9	330	1	2		1	90	1		
(Serbia)	30	CF	Mirosavljević	33	38	2922	21	1		23	1691	11	1		3	300	5			11	886	5			1	45			
(Cyprus)	31	GK	Avgousti																										
(Albania)	32	LB	Haxhi	24	25	2002	1	7	2	14	1060	1	2		4	368		3	1	7	574		2	1					
(Cyprus)	33	CM	Michael	36	39	3183	9	1		26	2122	7	1		5	423				8	638	2							
(Slovakia)	37	RW	Breška	14	31	1325	1	3		20	902	1	1		4	183				6	162		2		1	78			
(Greece)	44	LB	Koutsopoulos	11	11	915	1	2		9	780		2		2	135	1												
(Cyprus)	60	GK	Ioannou																										
(Cyprus)	71	RM	Theodorou																										
(Cyprus)	77	RM	Solomou	1	10	321	1	1		7	136	1	1		3	185													
(Brazil)	81	AM	Marcinho	3	9	271				8	268				1	3													
(Cyprus)	88	GK	Kissas	12	12	1110				8	720				3	300									1	90			

Last updated: May 20, 2010
Source: Match reports in competitive matches, apoelfc.com.cy
Ordered by start team, game starts and position on pitch (from back right to front left)
0 shown as blank
Country: when 2 flags, 1st flag = country that plays for internationally, 2nd flag = country of birth; N = number on jersey; P = Position; Name = Name on jersey (for more extended name, pause the mouse pointer on the name); GS = Game Started; A = Appearances.

=== Captains ===
1. (Cyprus) Marinos Satsias
2. (Cyprus) Chrysis Michael
3. (Cyprus) Constantinos Charalambides
4. (Greece) Christos Kontis

Source: apoelfc.com.cy

== Club ==
=== Management ===
Position	Staff
Manager	(Serbia) (Greece) Ivan Jovanović
Assistant manager	(Cyprus) Yiannos Ioannou
First team coach/Scout	(Serbia) Predrag Erak
Goalkeeping coach	(Albania) Foto Strakosha
Fitness coach	(Cyprus) Giorgos Paraskeva
Team doctor	(Cyprus) Costas Schizas

Last updated: November 21, 2008
Source: apoelfc.com.cy

=== Kit ===
Supplier: Puma
Sponsor(s): MTN

Home	Away	Third

Source: apoelfc.com.cy

=== Other information ===
Chairman	(Cyprus) Phivos Erotokritou
Ground (capacity and dimensions)	GSP Stadium (22,859 / 105x68 m)

Source: apoelfc.com.cy

== Pre-season friendlies ==
2009-06-24
18:00 EET

APOEL (Cyprus)	2 – 1	(Slovakia) MFK Košice
Papathanasiou 64'; Michael 85'	(Report)	Elia 55' (o.g.)

Obertraun, Austria

2009-07-02
19:00 EET

APOEL (Cyprus)	2 – 1	(Hungary) FC Fehérvár
Michael 71' (pen.); Papathanasiou 90'	(Report 1) (Report 2)	Máté 63'

Windischgarsten, Austria

2009-07-06
19:00 EET

APOEL (Cyprus)	0 – 2	(Czech Republic) Mladá Boleslav
	(Report)	Pecka 35'; Řezníček 87'

Leogang, Austria

== Competitions ==
=== Overall ===
Competition	Started round	Final position / round	First match	Last match
Marfin Laiki League	—	2nd	30 August 2009	8 May 2010
UEFA Champions League	2nd qualifying	Group stage	14 July 2009	8 December 2009
Cypriot Cup	2nd round	Runners-up	6 January 2010	15 May 2010
LTV Super Cup	Final	Winners	9 August 2009	

Updated to match played May 15, 2010
Source: Competitions

=== Marfin Laiki League ===
==== Classification ====
Pos	Team	Pld	W	D	L	GF	GA	GD	Pts	Qualification or relegation
2	Anorthosis Famagusta	26	18	4	4	45	20	+25	58	Qualification for second round, Group A
3	Apollon Limassol	26	17	6	3	43	15	+28	57	Qualification for second round, Group A
4	APOEL	26	16	7	3	46	18	+28	55	Qualification for second round, Group A
5	AEL Limassol	26	14	3	9	32	22	+10	45	Qualification for second round, Group B
6	APOP Kinyras	26	10	4	12	40	44	−4	34	Qualification for second round, Group B

Source: UEFA
Rules for classification: 1) points; 2) head-to-head points; 3) head-to-head goal difference; 4) head-to-head goals scored; 5) goal difference; 6) number of goals scored.
Qualified teams for Group A will play for one spot for the second qualifying round of the UEFA Champions League and two spots for the UEFA Europa League, one for the second and one for the first qualifying round.
A spot in the third qualifying round of UEFA Europa League will be awarded to the winners of the 2009–10 Cypriot Cup.
Qualified teams for Group C will play for one additional relegation spot.
Points gained in the First Round will be taken over into the Second Round groups.

==== Results summary ====
Overall								Home						Away					
Pld	W	D	L	GF	GA	GD	Pts	W	D	L	GF	GA	GD	W	D	L	GF	GA	GD
32	19	8	5	53	24	+29	65	11	3	2	29	9	+20	8	5	3	24	15	+9

Last updated: May 9, 2010.
Source: soccerway.com

==== Results by round ====
Round	1	2	3	4	5	6	7	8	9	10	11	12	13	14	15	16	17	18	19	20	21	22	23	24	25	26	27	28	29	30	31	32
Ground	A	H	A	H	A	H	A	H	A	H	A	H	A	H	A	H	A	H	A	H	A	H	A	H	A	H	H	A	A	H	A	H
Result	L	D	D	W	W	W	W	W	W	W	W	D	D	W	W	W	W	W	D	W	W	D	D	W	L	L	L	W	D	W	L	W

Updated to match(es) played on May 9, 2010. Source: apoelfc.com.cy
A = Away; H = Home; W = Win; D = Draw; L = Loss

==== Playoffs table ====
The first 12 teams are divided into 3 groups. Points are carried over from the first round.

==== Group A ====
Pos	Team	Pld	W	D	L	GF	GA	GD	Pts	Qualification
1	Omonia Nicosia (C)	32	22	8	2	60	25	+35	74	Qualification for Champions League second qualifying round
2	APOEL	32	19	8	5	53	24	+29	65	Qualification for Europa League second qualifying round
3	Anorthosis Famagusta	32	19	7	6	51	27	+24	64	Qualification for Europa League first qualifying round
4	Apollon Limassol	32	17	9	6	47	23	+24	60	Qualification for Europa League third qualifying round (Note: Apollon Limassol qualified for the third qualifying round of the 2010–11 UEFA Europa League after winning the 2009–10 Cypriot Cup.)

Rules for classification: 1) points; 2) head-to-head points; 3) head-to-head goal difference; 4) head-to-head goals scored; 5) goal difference; 6) number of goals scored.
(C) Champions

=== Matches ===
All times for the Domestic Competitions at EET

==== Regular season ====
2009-08-30
19:00

APOP/Kinyras	4 – 3	APOEL
Pinto 19' (o.g.); Buyse 53'; Zeljkovič 65' (pen.); Semedo 69'; Grimaldi (red card) 90+3'	(Report)	Paulo Jorge 24'; Haxhi 31'; Mirosavljević 61' (pen.)

Peyia Municipal Stadium, Peyia
Attendance: 2,525
Referee: Christos Nicolaidis

2009-09-12
20:00

APOEL	0 – 0	AEP Paphos
	(Report)

GSP Stadium, Nicosia
Attendance: 6,398
Referee: Leontios Trattos

2009-09-20
19:00

Paralimni	1 – 1	APOEL
Tornhout 31'	(Report)	Michael 90+2' (pen.)

Tasos Markou, Paralimni
Attendance: 2,299
Referee: Panikos Andronikou

2009-09-26
20:00

APOEL	3 – 0	Doxa
Sikora 12', 47'; Charalambides 39' (pen.)	(Report)

GSP Stadium, Nicosia
Attendance: 6,095
Referee: Marios Tsaggaris

2009-10-05
19:00

Ermis	1 – 2	APOEL
Joeano 60'	(Report)	Papathanasiou 74'; Michael 81'

Dasaki Stadium, Achna
Attendance: 1,893
Referee: Stelios Trifonos

2009-10-26
19:00

APOEL	2 – 0	Achna
Torres 58' (o.g.); Michael 61' (pen.)	(Report)

GSP Stadium, Nicosia
Attendance: 6,079
Referee: Leontios Trattos

2009-10-30
19:00

Aris L.	0 – 2	APOEL
	(Report)	Kontis 21'; Charalambides 76' (pen.)

Tsirion Stadium, Limassol
Attendance: 1,893
Referee: Stelios Trifonos

2009-11-09
19:00

APOEL	3 – 1	APEP
Michael 8' (pen.); Grnčarov 52'; Papathanasiou 63'	(Report)	Maliqi 86'

GSP Stadium, Nicosia
Attendance: 5,534
Referee: Antonis Christodoulou

2009-11-15
18:00

Nea Salamina	0 – 3 Awarded (Note: Match abandoned (at 0–1) after 76 minutes due to violent behaviour by Salamina's fans. APOEL awarded a 3–0 win.)	APOEL
Mašek (red card) 39'	(Report)	Pinto 75'

Ammochostos Stadium, Larnaca
Attendance: 1,752
Referee: Stelios Trifonos

2009-11-22
16:00

APOEL	2 – 0	Anorthosis
Mirosavljević 71'; Alexandrou 86'	(Report)	Laban (red card) 57'

GSP Stadium, Nicosia
Attendance: 8,992
Referee: Marios Panayi

2009-11-30
15:00

AEL	1 – 2	APOEL
Freddy 10'	(Report)	Morais 51'; Mirosavljević 56'

Tsirion Stadium, Limassol
Attendance: 5,033
Referee: Yiannis Anastasiou

2009-12-04
14:30

APOEL	1 – 1	Apollon
Charalambides 81'	(Report)	Bangura 19', (red card) 70'

GSP Stadium, Nicosia
Attendance: 7,001
Referee: Costas Kapitanis

2009-12-13
14:30

Omonia	1 – 1	APOEL
Konstantinou 54'	(Report)	Żewłakow 79'

GSP Stadium, Nicosia
Attendance: 16,271
Referee: Vasilis Demetriou

2009-12-20
18:00

APOEL	3 – 1	APOP/Kinyras
Żewłakow 3'; Michael 83' (pen.); Mirosavljević 90+2' (pen.)	(Report)	Semedo 90+4' (pen.)

GSP Stadium, Nicosia
Attendance: 7,086
Referee: Marios Tsangaris

2010-01-03
15:00

AEP Paphos	0 – 1	APOEL
	(Report)	Michael 70'

Pafiako Stadium, Pafos
Attendance: 3,495
Referee: Panikos Andronikou

2010-01-10
18:00

APOEL	3 – 1	Paralimni
Mirosavljević 15', 76'; Paulista 29'	(Report)	Tornhout 30'

GSP Stadium, Nicosia
Attendance: 7,123
Referee: Charalambos Skapoullis

2010-01-16
18:00

Doxa	1 – 2	APOEL
Henrique 2'	(Report)	Mirosavljević 42', 45'

Makario Stadium, Nicosia
Attendance: 4,720
Referee: Demetris Demetriou

2010-01-23
19:00

APOEL	1 – 0	Ermis
Kosowski 7'	(Report)

GSP Stadium, Nicosia
Attendance: 5,047
Referee: Christos Nicolaidis

2010-02-07
18:00

APOEL	5 – 0	Aris L.
Mirosavljević 20'; Kontis 34'; Grnčarov 73'; Charalambides 75'; Breška 81'	(Report)

GSP Stadium, Nicosia
Attendance: 4,690
Referee: Vasilis Demetriou

2010-02-15
18:00

APEP	1 – 4	APOEL
Gelson 27'	(Report)	Mirosavljević 44', 90+2'; Charalambides 54', 86'

Tsirion Stadium, Limassol
Attendance: 3,339
Referee: Vasilis Demetriou

2010-02-20
17:00

APOEL	0 – 0	Nea Salamina
	(Report)

GSP Stadium, Nicosia
Attendance: 7,657
Referee: Panikos Andronikou

2010-02-24
19:00

Achna	0 – 0	APOEL
	(Report)

Dasaki Stadium, Achna
Attendance: 2,577
Referee: (Israel) Shau Shicric

2010-02-28
15:00

Anorthosis	0 – 0	APOEL
	(Report)

Antonis Papadopoulos, Larnaca
Attendance: 7,957
Referee: (Israel) Eitan Tabrizi

2010-03-07
15:30

APOEL	1 – 0	AEL
Michael 11'	(Report)

GSP Stadium, Nicosia
Attendance: 9,472
Referee: (Bulgaria) Stanislav Todorov

2010-03-14
15:30

Apollon	2 – 0	APOEL
Agogo 47'; Adorno 78'	(Report)

Tsirion Stadium, Limassol
Attendance: 9,104
Referee: (Israel) Alon Yefet

2010-03-21
15:30

APOEL	1 – 2	Omonia
Papathanasiou 46'	(Report)	Aloneftis 61'; Konstantinou 89'

GSP Stadium, Nicosia
Attendance: 17,559
Referee: (Israel) Menashe Masiah

==== Playoffs ====
2010-03-28
16:30

APOEL	0 – 1	Omonia
	(Report)	Aloneftis 49'

GSP Stadium, Nicosia
Attendance: 16,178
Referee: (Israel) Haim Yaacov

2010-04-11
17:00

Apollon	1 – 2	APOEL
Lai 42'; Segares (red card) 90+4'	(Report)	Żewłakow 24'; Charalambides 70', (red card) 85'

Tsirion Stadium, Limassol
Attendance: 3,362
Referee: (Bulgaria) Anton Genov

2010-04-18
17:00

Anorthosis	1 – 1	APOEL
Cafú 40'	(Report)	Kosowski 4'

Antonis Papadopoulos, Larnaca
Attendance: 3,838
Referee: (Israel) Eli Hacmon

2010-04-24
17:30

APOEL	1 – 0	Anorthosis
Solomou 78'	(Report)

GSP Stadium, Nicosia
Attendance: 4,352
Referee: (Israel) Eitan Tabrizi

2010-05-02
17:30

Omonia	1 – 0	APOEL
Aloneftis 17'	(Report)

GSP Stadium, Nicosia
Attendance: 13,644
Referee: (Israel) Eli Hacmon

2010-05-08
17:30

APOEL	3 – 2	Apollon
Charalambides 11' (pen.), 72'; Paulista 58'	(Report)	Avraam 62', 76'

GSP Stadium, Nicosia
Attendance: 1,880
Referee: (Greece) Giorgos Daloukas

=== UEFA Champions League ===
==== Qualifying phase ====
===== Second qualifying round =====
2009-07-14
20:00 CET

EB/Streymur (Faroe Islands)	0 – 2	(Cyprus) APOEL
	(Report 1) (Report 2)	Mirosavljević 11'; Żewłakow 77'

Tórsvøllur, Tórshavn
Attendance: 300
Referee: (Ukraine) Oleg Oriekhov

2009-07-21
19:00 CET

APOEL (Cyprus)	3 – 0	(Faroe Islands) EB/Streymur
Żewłakow 42'; Alexandrou 63'; Mirosavljević 75'	(Report 1) (Report 2)

GSP Stadium, Nicosia
Attendance: 9,054
Referee: (Switzerland) Cyril Zimmermann

APOEL won 5–0 on aggregate.

===== Third qualifying round =====
2009-07-29
19:00 CET

APOEL (Cyprus)	2 – 0	(Serbia) FK Partizan
Mirosavljević 49'; Żewłakow 85'	(Report 1) (Report 2)

GSP Stadium, Nicosia
Attendance: 15,882
Referee: (Netherlands) Bjorn Kuipers

2009-08-05
20:45 CET

FK Partizan (Serbia)	1 – 0	(Cyprus) APOEL
Moreira 3'	(Report 1) (Report 2)	Broerse (red card) 89'

Stadion Partizana, Belgrade
Attendance: 23,867
Referee: (Italy) Matteo Trefoloni

APOEL won 2–1 on aggregate.

===== Play-off round =====
2009-08-18
20:45 CET

Copenhagen (Denmark)	1 – 0	(Cyprus) APOEL
Pospěch 54'	(Report 1) (Report 2)	Haxhi (red card) 90'

Parken Stadium, Copenhagen
Attendance: 16,250
Referee: (Luxembourg) Alain Hamer

2009-08-26
20:45 CET

APOEL (Cyprus)	3 – 1	(Denmark) Copenhagen
Kosowski 2'; Michael 18' (pen.), 41'	(Report 1) (Report 2)	N'Doye 22'

GSP Stadium, Nicosia
Attendance: 21,133
Referee: (Austria) Konrad Plautz

APOEL won 3–2 on aggregate.

==== Group stage ====
Key to colours in group tables
Group winner and runner-up advance to the round of 16
Third-placed team enter the UEFA Europa League at the round of 32
Fourth-placed team is eliminated from all European competitions.

===== Group D standings and fixtures =====
Pos	Team	Pld	W	D	L	GF	GA	GD	Pts	Qualification	CHE	POR	ATM	APO
1	(England) Chelsea	6	4	2	0	11	4	+7	14	Advance to knockout phase	—	1–0	4–0	2–2
2	(Portugal) Porto	6	4	0	2	8	3	+5	12	Advance to knockout phase	0–1	—	2–0	2–1
3	(Spain) Atlético Madrid	6	0	3	3	3	12	−9	3	Transfer to Europa League	2–2	0–3	—	0–0
4	(Cyprus) APOEL	6	0	3	3	4	7	−3	3		0–1	0–1	1–1	—

Source: RSSSF

===== Matches =====
2009-09-15
20:45 CET

Atlético Madrid (Spain)	0 – 0	(Cyprus) APOEL
	(Report 1) (Report 2)

Vicente Calderón, Madrid
Attendance: 30,628
Referee: (Scotland) Craig Thomson

2009-09-30
20:45 CET

APOEL (Cyprus)	0 – 1	(England) Chelsea
	(Report 1) (Report 2)	Anelka 18'

GSP Stadium, Nicosia
Attendance: 21,657
Referee: (France) Bertrand Layec

2009-10-21
20:45 CET

Porto (Portugal)	2 – 1	(Cyprus) APOEL
Hulk 33', 48' (pen.); González (red card) 74'	(Report 1) (Report 2)	Pereira 22' (o.g.)

Estádio do Dragão, Porto
Attendance: 31,212
Referee: (Germany) Felix Brych

2009-11-03
20:45 CET

APOEL (Cyprus)	0 – 1	(Portugal) Porto
	(Report 1) (Report 2)	Falcao 84'

GSP Stadium, Nicosia
Attendance: 20,825
Referee: (Slovenia) Damir Skomina

2009-11-25
20:45 CET

APOEL (Cyprus)	1 – 1	(Spain) Atlético Madrid
Mirosavljević 5'	(Report 1) (Report 2)	Simão 62'

GSP Stadium, Nicosia
Attendance: 21,178
Referee: (Belgium) Frank De Bleeckere

2009-12-08
20:45 CET

Chelsea (England)	2 – 2	(Cyprus) APOEL
Essien 19'; Drogba 26'	(Report 1) (Report 2)	Żewłakow 6'; Mirosavljević 87'

Stamford Bridge, London
Attendance: 40,917
Referee: (Italy) Matteo Trefoloni

=== LTV Super Cup ===
2009-08-09
20:00 EET

APOEL	2 – 1	APOP/Kinyras
Grnčarov 49'; Alexandrou 85'	(Report)	González 4'

GSP Stadium, Nicosia
Attendance: 7,068
Referee: Demetris Chrysostomou

APOEL won the 2009 Cypriot Super Cup (11th title).

=== Cypriot Cup ===
==== Second round ====
2010-01-06
16:00 EET

APOEL	0 – 2	Achna
	(Report)	Cássio 31'; Poyiatzis 90+1' (pen.)

GSP Stadium, Nicosia
Attendance: 5,075
Referee: Marios Panayi

2010-01-27
19:00 EET

Achna	0 – 4 (a.e.t.)	APOEL
Kotsonis (red card) 87'	(Report)	Pinto 17'; Paulo Jorge 90+3'; Mirosavljević 97', 114'; Haxhi (red card) 107'

Dasaki Stadium, Achna
Attendance: 3,000
Referee: Leontios Trattos

APOEL won 4–2 on aggregate.

==== Quarter-finals ====
2010-02-03
19:00 EET

APOEL	5 – 0	Ermis
Pinto 17'; Mirosavljević 45', 75', 90'; Koutsopoulos 59'	(Report)

GSP Stadium, Nicosia
Attendance: 2,967
Referee: Marios Tsaggaris

2010-02-10
18:00 EET

Ermis	0 – 1	APOEL
	(Report)	Charalambides 76'

Makario Stadium, Nicosia
Attendance: 604
Referee: Savvas Zafiris

APOEL won 6–0 on aggregate.

==== Semi-finals ====
2010-04-14
18:30 EET

APOEL	0 – 0	Aris L.
	(Report)	Lombé (red card) 40'

GSP Stadium, Nicosia
Attendance: 6,113
Referee: (Bulgaria) Hristo Ristoskov

2010-04-27
18:30 EET

Aris L.	0 – 2	APOEL
	(Report)	Charalambides 41'; Kosowski 76'

Tsirion Stadium, Limassol
Attendance: 3,034
Referee: (Israel) Liran Liani

APOEL won 2–0 on aggregate.

==== Final ====
2010-05-15
19:00 EET

Apollon	2 – 1	APOEL
Bangura 1'; Merkis 72'	(Report)	Żewłakow 23'

GSZ Stadium, Larnaca
Attendance: 12,000
Referee: (Italy) Roberto Rosetti

Apollon won the 2009–10 Cypriot Cup (6th title).
