= 2007–08 in Cypriot football =

== Events ==
- September 1, 2007: The Cypriot First Division 2007-08 league started.
- September 22, 2007: The Cypriot Second Division 2007-08 league started.
- October 11, 2007: The Cyprus National team draws 1–1 away against Ireland for the Euro 2008 qualifiers.
  With this game the national teams breaks their UEFA Euro qualifier record for number of points (14, previous 12).
- April 12, 2008: The Cypriot Second Division 2007-08 league finished. AE Paphos were the winners. APEP and Atromitos Yeroskipou were also promoted to the first division.
- May 11, 2008: The Cypriot First Division 2007-08 league finished. Anorthosis Famagusta were the champions. They finished the league undefeated. Olympiakos Nicosia, Nea Salamis and Aris Limassol were relegated.
- May 17, 2008: The Cypriot Cup 2007-08 finished. APOEL were the winners with 2–0.

== See also ==
- Cypriot First Division 2007-08
- Cypriot Cup 2007-08
- 2007–08 Cypriot Second Division
