= 2007–08 Cypriot Third Division =

Cypriot Third Division
- Season: 2007–08
- Champions: PAEEK FC (3rd title)
- Promoted: PAEEK FC; Ethnikos; Chalkanoras
- Relegated: Anagennisi G. ENAD; Iraklis
- Matches played: 182
- Goals scored: 612 (3.36 per match)

The 2007–08 Cypriot Third Division was the 37th season of the Cypriot third-level football league. PAEEK FC won their 3rd title.

== Format ==
Fourteen teams participated in the 2007–08 Cypriot Third Division. All teams played against each other twice, once at their home and once away. The team with the most points at the end of the season crowned champions. The first three teams were promoted to the 2008–09 Cypriot Second Division and the last three teams were relegated to the 2008–09 Cypriot Fourth Division.

=== Point system ===
Teams received three points for a win, one point for a draw and zero points for a loss.

== Changes from previous season ==
Teams promoted to 2007–08 Cypriot Second Division

- Ermis Aradippou
- Atromitos Yeroskipou
- Olympos Xylofagou

Teams relegated from 2006–07 Cypriot Second Division

- Chalkanoras Idaliou
- Iraklis Gerolakkou
- AEM Mesogis^{1}

^{1}AEM Mesogis merged with Kissos Kissonergas forming Kissos Kissonergas, which took the place of AEM Mesogis in the Cypriot Third Division.

Teams promoted from 2006–07 Cypriot Fourth Division

- Spartakos Kitiou
- AEK Kouklia
- Anagennisi Trachoniou

Teams relegated to 2007–08 Cypriot Fourth Division

- Digenis Oroklinis
- FC Episkopi
- SEK Agiou Athanasiou

== League standings ==
Pos	Team	Pld	W	D	L	GF	GA	GD	Pts	Promotion or relegation
1	PAEEK FC (C, P)	26	16	4	6	55	38	+17	52	Promoted to Cypriot Second Division
2	Ethnikos Assia (P)	26	15	6	5	53	24	+29	51	Promoted to Cypriot Second Division
3	Chalkanoras Idaliou (P)	26	12	10	4	42	30	+12	46	Promoted to Cypriot Second Division
4	Spartakos Kitiou	26	12	8	6	59	38	+21	44	
5	Frenaros FC	26	12	7	7	48	43	+5	43	
6	Adonis Idaliou	26	12	6	8	59	35	+24	42	
7	AEZ Zakakiou	26	10	6	10	41	33	+8	36	
8	AEK Kouklia	26	9	6	11	37	46	−9	33 (Note: AEK 3p, 2–2, 1 a.; Anagennisi 0p, 2–2, 0 a.)	
9	Anagennisi Trachoniou	26	8	9	9	43	41	+2	33	
10	Kissos Kissonergas	26	9	5	12	43	54	−11	32	
11	Elpida Xylofagou	26	9	4	13	33	48	−15	31	
12	Anagennisi Germasogeias (R)	26	6	8	12	29	45	−16	26	Relegated to Cypriot Fourth Division
13	ENAD Polis Chrysochous (R)	26	5	5	16	31	62	−31	20	Relegated to Cypriot Fourth Division
14	Iraklis Gerolakkou (R)	26	4	2	20	39	75	−36	14	Relegated to Cypriot Fourth Division

Rules for classification: 1) points; 2) head-to-head points; 3) head-to-head goal difference; 4) head-to-head away goals scored; 5) goal difference; 6) number of goals scored.
(C) Champions; (P) Promoted; (R) Relegated

== Results ==
Home \ Away	ADN	AEZ	AEK	ANG	ANT	ETN	ELP	END	IRK	KSS	PKK	SPR	FRN	CHL
Adonis		2–1	4–1	7–2	3–4	1–1	2–0	8–0	2–2	0–1	1–1	1–3	6–2	0–1
AEZ	2–0		4–1	3–0	2–1	1–0	0–0	5–0	3–2	1–2	0–2	1–1	0–2	0–0
AEK	1–1	1–0		0–1	1–0	1–1	2–0	0–0	4–0	2–3	0–2	2–2	1–2	1–1
Anagennisi G.	0–1	0–2	0–2		1–1	1–3	0–2	2–2	3–2	1–0	0–2	2–1	3–1	1–1
Anagennisi T.	1–1	2–3	2–1	0–0		0–1	4–2	6–1	5–5	1–1	4–3	1–0	3–1	0–0
Ethnikos Assia	0–0	3–0	3–2	2–1	2–0		6–0	2–1	2–1	1–0	1–1	3–1	2–0	1–2
Elpida	0–3	1–0	3–1	2–1	1–1	1–3		2–0	4–1	3–4	1–3	1–1	1–2	1–0
ENAD	2–1	4–3	2–3	1–1	1–0	0–4	1–1		4–2	1–1	2–3	2–3	3–1	1–3
Iraklis	1–3	3–2	0–2	0–1	0–2	1–6	0–3	3–2		1–2	1–3	6–1	1–3	1–2
Kissos	1–3	3–6	2–3	0–0	1–1	0–0	2–3	1–0	5–2		3–2	2–4	1–0	1–3
PAEEK FC	3–5	2–1	4–0	3–2	3–1	2–1	2–0	2–0	0–1	3–1		1–0	1–1	3–2
Spartakos	2–0	1–1	7–1	3–3	3–0	2–1	3–0	3–1	3–0	4–2	2–2		5–0	2–2
Frenaros FC	3–1	0–0	0–0	4–3	2–2	2–1	3–0	1–0	4–2	6–2	5–2	1–1		1–1
Chalkanoras	0–3	0–0	2–4	0–0	2–1	3–3	3–1	1–0	4–1	3–2	3–0	2–1	1–1	

Legend: Blue = home team win; Yellow = draw; Red = away team win.

== See also ==
- Cypriot Third Division
- 2007–08 Cypriot First Division
- 2007–08 Cypriot Cup

== Sources ==
- "2007/08 Cypriot Third Division". Rec.Sport.Soccer Statistics Foundation. 2016-01-14.
