= 2008–09 Cypriot Second Division =

Cypriot Second Division
- Season: 2008–09
- Champions: Ermis (3rd title)
- Promoted: Ermis; Aris; Nea Salamina
- Relegated: Chalkanoras; THOI; Ethnikos
- Matches: 182
- Goals: 474 (2.6 per match)

The 2008–09 Cypriot Second Division was the 54th season of the Cypriot second-level football league. Ermis won their 3rd title.

== Format ==
Fourteen teams participated in the 2008–09 Cypriot Second Division. All teams played against each other twice, once at their home and once away. The team with the most points at the end of the season crowned champions. The first three teams were promoted to 2009–10 Cypriot First Division and the last three teams were relegated to the 2009–10 Cypriot Third Division.

== Changes from previous season ==
Teams promoted to 2008–09 Cypriot First Division

- AEP Paphos
- APEP
- Atromitos Yeroskipou

Teams relegated from 2007–08 Cypriot First Division

- Aris Limassol
- Nea Salamina
- Olympiakos Nicosia

Teams promoted from 2007–08 Cypriot Third Division

- PAEEK FC
- Ethnikos Assia
- Chalkanoras Idaliou

Teams relegated to 2008–09 Cypriot Third Division

- Anagennisi Deryneia
- Akritas Chlorakas
- Olympos Xylofagou

== League standings ==
Pos	Team	Pld	W	D	L	GF	GA	GD	Pts	Promotion or relegation
1	Ermis Aradippou (C, P)	26	14	8	4	47	26	+21	50	Promoted to Cypriot First Division
2	Aris Limassol (P)	26	15	4	7	56	25	+31	49 (Note: Aris 0–0 Nea Salamina; Nea Salamina 0–0 Aris)	Promoted to Cypriot First Division
3	Nea Salamina (P)	26	14	7	5	38	21	+17	49	Promoted to Cypriot First Division
4	Olympiakos Nicosia	26	14	6	6	39	21	+18	48	
5	Digenis Morphou	26	13	5	8	38	28	+10	44	
6	Omonia Aradippou	26	11	4	11	33	41	−8	37	
7	MEAP Nisou	26	10	6	10	25	28	−3	36	
8	Ayia Napa	26	7	10	9	23	31	−8	31 (Note: Ayia Napa 1–0 Onisilos; Onisilos 0–0 Ayia Napa)	
9	Onisilos Sotira	26	8	7	11	30	36	−6	31	
10	ASIL Lysi	26	7	9	10	29	30	−1	30	
11	PAEEK FC	26	7	8	11	27	31	−4	29	
12	Chalkanoras Idaliou (R)	26	7	4	15	28	48	−20	25 (Note: Chalkanoras 2–0 THOI; THOI 1–0 Chalkanoras)	Relegated to Cypriot Third Division
13	THOI Lakatamia (R)	26	7	4	15	31	46	−15	25	Relegated to Cypriot Third Division
14	Ethnikos Assia (R)	26	3	8	15	30	62	−32	17	Relegated to Cypriot Third Division

Source: cfa.com.cy
Rules for classification: 1) points; 2) head-to-head points; 3) head-to-head goal difference; 4) head-to-head away goals scored; 5) goal difference; 6) number of goals scored
(C) Champions; (P) Promoted; (R) Relegated

== Results ==
Home \ Away	ANP	ARS	ASL	DGN	ETN	THL	ERM	MPN	NSL	OLM	OMN	ONL	PKK	CHL
Ayia Napa		2–1	1–1	1–1	2–2	1–2	1–3	1–1	1–2	0–0	0–4	1–0	1–2	1–0
Aris	2–0		2–0	2–0	5–0	3–1	2–1	4–1	0–0	3–1	3–0	0–1	1–2	6–1
ASIL	0–0	2–1		1–2	1–1	2–0	0–1	2–0	0–1	0–0	1–1	1–1	2–2	2–0
Digenis	3–0	2–1	0–1		4–3	2–3	2–0	1–0	1–1	1–2	3–0	1–1	0–1	0–1
Ethnikos Assia	1–3	2–4	2–4	1–3		2–1	1–1	1–1	1–5	0–3	1–2	2–1	0–3	1–1
THOI	0–1	0–4	2–1	2–2	4–1		0–2	1–1	1–2	0–2	2–0	0–1	2–2	1–0
Ermis	0–0	0–0	2–0	2–1	4–1	3–2		4–2	0–0	0–1	4–1	4–1	2–2	3–1
MEAP	1–1	1–0	1–0	0–1	2–1	1–0	0–0		2–0	1–0	1–2	0–0	3–1	2–1
Nea Salamina	0–1	0–0	1–3	4–1	2–0	2–1	0–0	1–2		2–0	1–0	2–0	1–0	2–0
Olympiakos	2–1	3–2	0–0	0–0	0–0	5–1	1–2	2–0	1–2		3–1	1–1	2–1	1–0
Omonia	0–1	1–2	1–0	0–2	2–2	3–2	1–1	1–0	4–3	1–4		0–0	1–0	2–0
Onisilos	0–0	2–5	3–1	1–2	3–1	1–1	3–2	1–0	0–2	0–3	2–3		2–1	5–0
PAEEK FC	0–0	1–1	2–2	0–1	0–2	0–2	1–2	0–1	0–0	1–0	0–1	2–0		0–0
Chalkanoras	3–2	1–2	3–2	0–2	1–1	2–0	2–4	2–1	2–2	1–2	3–1	1–0	2–3	

Source: cfa.com.cy
Legend: Blue = home team win; Yellow = draw; Red = away team win.

== Top scorers ==
Rank	Player	Club	Goals
1	(Bosnia and Herzegovina) Slaviša Dugić	Aris Limassol	14
1	(Bulgaria) Konstantin Mirchev	Omonia Aradippou	14
3	(Cyprus) Marios Neophytou	Olympiakos Nicosia	10
3	(Cyprus) Andreas Papathanasiou	Ermis Aradippou	10
3	(Cyprus) Marios Christodoulou	Ermis Aradippou	10
6	(Zimbabwe) Shingayi Kaondera	Nea Salamina	9

Source: cfa.com.cy

== See also ==
- Cypriot Second Division
- 2008–09 Cypriot First Division
- 2008–09 Cypriot Cup
- 2008–09 in Cypriot football

== Sources ==
- "2008/09 Cypriot Second Division". Rec.Sport.Soccer Statistics Foundation. 2016-01-14.
- "2. DIVISION 2008–09". Soccerway. Archived from the original on October 26, 2016.
