= Hélio Pinto =

Portuguese footballer

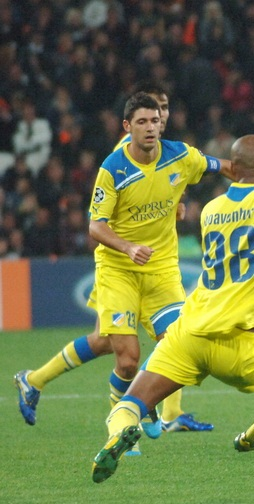
- Pinto playing for APOEL in 2011

Personal information
- Full name: Hélio José Ribeiro Pinto
- Date of birth: 29 February 1984 (age 42)
- Place of birth: Portimão, Portugal
- Height: 1.84 m (6 ft 0 in)
- Position: Central midfielder

Youth career
- 1994–1999: Portimonense
- 1999–2002: Benfica

Senior career*
Years	Team	Apps	(Gls)
2002–2004	Benfica B		
2003–2004	Benfica	2	(0)
2004–2006	Sevilla B	18	(0)
2005–2006	→ Apollon Limassol (loan)	25	(2)
2006–2013	APOEL	190	(16)
2013–2015	Legia Warsaw	43	(7)
2014	Legia Warsaw II	1	(0)
2015–2016	Al-Mesaimeer	15	(0)
2016	Anorthosis	0	(0)
2016–2017	Kongsvinger	11	(0)
2017	Trikala	3	(0)
2017	Kongsvinger	10	(0)
2018	NorthEast United	3	(0)
2018–2021	Louletano	59	(0)
Total		380	(25)

International career
2002	Portugal U18	2	(1)
2002–2003	Portugal U19	14	(0)
2004	Portugal U20	1	(0)

Managerial career
- 2021–2022: Louletano B (assistant)
- 2022: Louletano B
- 2022–2023: Olhanense
- * Club domestic league appearances and goals

Hélio José Ribeiro Pinto (born 29 February 1984) is a Portuguese former professional footballer who played as a central midfielder, currently a manager.

A youth product of Benfica, he spent most of his career with APOEL in Cyprus, appearing in 276 competitive matches and winning eight major titles. He also played in Spain, Cyprus, Poland, Qatar, Norway, Greece and India.

== Club career ==
Pinto was born in Portimão, Algarve. A product of S.L. Benfica's youth system, he could never break into the first team, tottalling just five minutes in the Primeira Liga under José Antonio Camacho. His next stop was in Spain with Sevilla FC, where he only appeared for the reserves.

Still owned by Sevilla, Pinto spent the 2005–06 season in Cyprus with Apollon Limassol FC. Being released the summer, his career settled with another team in the country, APOEL FC.

During his spell with APOEL, Pinto was an important member as the club won the Cypriot First Division on four occasions, adding amongst other trophies the domestic cup in 2007–08. He also appeared in all six group-stage games in their first participation in the UEFA Champions League.

Pinto played eight matches in the 2011–12 Champions League, as the Nicosia-based side surprisingly reached the quarter-finals of the competition. On 5 June 2013, he signed a three-year contract extension but, later that month, announced he was leaving after seven years.

On 21 June 2013, Pinto agreed to a two-year deal (with an option for another season) with Legia Warsaw from Poland. He was released two years later, moving to the Qatar Stars League with Al-Mesaimeer Sports Club shortly after.

On 2 February 2016, Pinto returned to Cyprus and joined Anorthosis Famagusta FC. The following 28 January, he signed with Greek club Trikala F.C. from Norway's Kongsvinger IL Toppfotball.

Following a stint with Indian Super League franchise NorthEast United FC, Pinto returned to Portugal after 14 years and agreed to a contract at third-tier Louletano D.C. on 15 June 2018.

== International career ==
Pinto gained Cypriot nationality on 27 July 2012, and the Cyprus Football Association subsequently waited for FIFA approval on whether could play for the national team. The governing body eventually ruled he could not represent his adopted nation, after having appeared for Portugal at under-18, under-19 and under-20 levels.

== Coaching career ==
After starting his coaching career with Louletano's reserves, on 8 November 2022 Pinto was named manager of S.C. Olhanense, bottom at the Campeonato de Portugal. His only season resulted in unprecedented relegation to the district leagues, nine years after being a top-flight club; he was then replaced by Miguel Serôdio.

== Career statistics ==
As of 28 April 2019

Appearances and goals by club, season and competition
Club	Season	League			National cup (Note: Includes Taça de Portugal, Cypriot Cup, Polish Cup, Norwegian Cup)		Continental		Other		Total	
Club	Season	Division	Apps	Goals	Apps	Goals	Apps	Goals	Apps	Goals	Apps	Goals
Benfica	2002–03	Primeira Liga	0	0	0	0	0	0	—		0	0
Benfica	2003–04	Primeira Liga	2	0	2	0	1 (Note: Appearance in UEFA Cup)	0	—		5	0
Benfica	Total		2	0	2	0	1	0	—		5	0
Sevilla B	2004–05	Segunda División B	18	0	—		—		—		18	0
Apollon Limassol (loan)	2005–06	Cypriot First Division	25	2			—		—		25	2
APOEL	2006–07	Cypriot First Division	23	4	8	1	3	0	0	0	34	5
APOEL	2007–08	Cypriot First Division	28	2	8	0	2 (Note: Appearances in UEFA Champions League)	0	1 (Note: Appearances in Cypriot Super Cup)	1	39	3
APOEL	2008–09	Cypriot First Division	27	2	5	1	5	2	1	0	38	5
APOEL	2009–10	Cypriot First Division	25	1	7	2	12	0	1	0	45	3
APOEL	2010–11	Cypriot First Division	26	1	2	0	6 (Note: Appearances in UEFA Europa League)	1	—		34	2
APOEL	2011–12	Cypriot First Division	32	1	3	0	14	0	1	0	50	1
APOEL	2012–13	Cypriot First Division	29	5	1	0	6	1	—		36	6
APOEL	Total		190	16	34	4	48	4	4	1	276	25
Legia Warsaw	2013–14	Ekstraklasa	25	6	2	1	7 (Note: Two appearances in UEFA Champions League, five appearances in UEFA Europa League)	0	—		34	7
Legia Warsaw	2014–15	Ekstraklasa	18	1	5	0	3 (Note: Two appearances in UEFA Champions League, one appearance in UEFA Europa League)	0	0	0	26	1
Legia Warsaw	Total		43	7	7	1	10	0	0	0	60	8
Legia Warsaw II	2014–15	III liga, group A	1	0	—		—		—		1	0
Al-Mesaimeer	2015–16	Qatar Stars League	15	0	0	0	—		—		15	0
Kongsvinger	2016	1. divisjon	11	1	3	0	—		—		14	1
Trikala	2016–17	Football League	3	0	0	0	—		—		3	0
Kongsvinger	2017	1. divisjon	10	0	0	0	—		—		10	0
NorthEast United	2017–18	Indian Super League	3	0	0	0	—		—		3	0
Louletano	2018–19	Campeonato de Portugal	24	0	2	0	—		—		26	0
Career total			345	26	48	5	59	4	4	1	456	36

== Honours ==
Apollon Limassol

- Cypriot First Division: 2005–06

APOEL

- Cypriot First Division: 2006–07, 2008–09, 2010–11, 2012–13
- Cypriot Cup: 2007–08
- Cypriot Super Cup: 2008, 2009, 2011

Legia Warsaw

- Ekstraklasa: 2013–14
- Polish Cup: 2014–15
