= 2007–08 Cypriot Fourth Division =

Cypriot Fourth Division
- Season: 2007–08
- Champions: Digenis (1st title)
- Promoted: Digenis; Othellos; Orfeas
- Relegated: Ethnikos; SEK; Episkopi
- Matches played: 182
- Goals scored: 586 (3.22 per match)

The 2007–08 Cypriot Fourth Division was the 23rd season of the Cypriot fourth-level football league. Digenis Oroklinis won their 1st title.

== Format ==
Fourteen teams participated in the 2007–08 Cypriot Fourth Division. All teams played against each other twice, once at their home and once away. The team with the most points at the end of the season crowned champions. The first three teams were promoted to the 2008–09 Cypriot Third Division and the last three teams were relegated to regional leagues.

=== Point system ===
Teams received three points for a win, one point for a draw and zero points for a loss.

== Changes from previous season ==
Teams promoted to 2007–08 Cypriot Third Division

- Spartakos Kitiou
- AEK Kouklia
- Anagennisi Trachoniou

Teams relegated from 2006–07 Cypriot Third Division

- Digenis Oroklinis
- FC Episkopi
- SEK Agiou Athanasiou

Teams promoted from regional leagues

- ASPIS Pylas
- Ellinismos Akakiou
- P.O. Xylotymvou

Teams relegated to regional leagues

- AEK Kythreas
- AOL/Omonia Lakatamias
- Thiella Dromolaxia

== League standings ==
Pos	Team	Pld	W	D	L	GF	GA	GD	Pts	Promotion or relegation
1	Digenis Oroklinis (C, P)	26	17	6	3	49	22	+27	57	Promoted to Cypriot Third Division
2	Othellos Athienou (P)	26	15	9	2	60	28	+32	54	Promoted to Cypriot Third Division
3	Orfeas Nicosia (P)	26	14	8	4	59	34	+25	50	Promoted to Cypriot Third Division
4	Enosis Neon Parekklisia	26	15	2	9	57	38	+19	47	
5	Sourouklis Troullon	26	11	6	9	38	31	+7	39	
6	Enosis Kokkinotrimithia	26	9	10	7	50	33	+17	37 (Note: Enosis 0–0 ASPIS; ASPIS 0–0 Enosis)	
7	ASPIS Pylas	26	11	4	11	35	40	−5	37	
8	Achyronas Liopetriou	26	10	4	12	44	50	−6	34	
9	Ellinismos Akakiou	26	9	6	11	29	43	−14	33 (Note: Ellinismos 7p; APEP 6p; P.O. Xylotymvou 4p)	
10	APEP Pelendriou	26	9	6	11	43	47	−4	33	
11	P.O. Xylotymvou	26	9	6	11	39	43	−4	33	
12	Ethnikos Latsion FC (R)	26	8	7	11	42	53	−11	31	Relegated to regional leagues
13	SEK Agiou Athanasiou (Note: SEK Agiou Athanasiou had 3 points deducted.) (R)	26	2	5	19	22	66	−44	8	Relegated to regional leagues
14	FC Episkopi (Note: FC Episkopis had 6 points deducted; they withdrew at the half-way stage (after 13th round) and their remaining matches were awarded 0–2 against them.) (R)	26	2	3	21	19	58	−39	3	Relegated to regional leagues

Rules for classification: 1) points; 2) head-to-head points; 3) head-to-head goal difference; 4) head-to-head away goals scored; 5) goal difference; 6) number of goals scored
(C) Champions; (P) Promoted; (R) Relegated

== Results ==
Home \ Away	APP	ASP	ACR	DGN	ETN	ELN	ENK	ENP	EPS (Note: FC Episkopis withdrew at the half-way stage (after 13th round) and their remaining matches are awarded 0–2 against them.)	XLT	OTL	ORF	SEK	SRK
APEP		4–3	4–1	2–2	2–3	5–4	0–1	0–2	2–0	3–1	0–0	1–0	1–1	2–2
ASPIS	2–0		2–1	0–1	2–0	3–0	0–0	2–1	2–1	2–4	1–1	0–2	1–0	2–1
Achyronas	1–1	2–1		1–2	2–1	3–1	1–5	1–3	2–0	3–1	0–2	6–0	1–1	3–3
Digenis	5–2	3–2	4–0		1–1	0–1	3–2	2–1	1–1	4–1	2–2	0–0	3–0	1–0
Ethnikos Latsion FC	2–2	2–1	1–1	0–2		2–2	1–1	3–0	2–0	0–3	0–2	1–6	1–0	2–2
Ellinismos	2–1	0–0	1–2	1–0	2–2		0–4	0–3	1–0	2–1	1–2	1–3	2–0	1–0
Enosis	0–1	0–0	2–0	1–2	5–2	1–2		2–1	2–0	1–1	3–3	2–2	4–0	0–0
ENP	2–1	7–0	3–1	1–2	3–2	2–0	2–1		2–1	0–0	5–2	3–3	6–2	0–1
FC Episkopi (Note: FC Episkopis withdrew at the half-way stage (after 13th round) and their remaining matches are awarded 0–2 against them.)	3–2	0–2	0–4	0–2	1–4	0–2	2–2	0–2		3–1	0–2	0–2	0–2	1–3
P.O. Xylotymvou	3–1	0–1	4–2	1–1	4–2	1–1	1–1	0–3	2–0		2–3	1–4	1–0	2–1
Othellos	2–1	4–0	1–0	0–3	6–2	2–0	6–2	4–1	4–1	1–1		0–0	5–0	3–0
Orfeas	3–1	3–2	4–1	0–1	2–1	4–0	1–1	5–2	2–2	2–1	1–1		5–2	1–2
SEK	1–2	1–3	2–3	0–2	1–4	1–1	0–7	1–2	4–3	1–2	0–0	1–1		1–4
Sourouklis	1–2	2–1	1–2	2–0	0–1	1–1	2–0	2–0	2–0	1–0	2–2	1–3	2–0	

Legend: Blue = home team win; Yellow = draw; Red = away team win.

== See also ==
- Cypriot Fourth Division
- 2007–08 Cypriot First Division
- 2007–08 Cypriot Cup

== Sources ==
- "2007/08 Cypriot Fourth Division". Rec.Sport.Soccer Statistics Foundation. 2016-01-14.
