= Atromitos =

Atromitos (Greek: Ατρόμητος, "fearless") may refer to:

- Atromitos F.C., a football team based in Peristeri, Greece
- Atromitos Piraeus, a football team based in Piraeus, Greece
- Atromitos Yeroskipou, a football team currently playing in the Cypriot Second Division
- Atromitos Stadium, a multi-purpose stadium in Peristeri, Greece
