= 2007–08 Cypriot Second Division =

Cypriot Second Division
- Season: 2007–08
- Champions: AEP (2nd title)
- Promoted: AEP; APEP; Atromitos
- Relegated: Anagennisi; Akritas; Olympos
- Matches: 182
- Goals: 462 (2.54 per match)

The 2007–08 Cypriot Second Division was the 53rd season of the Cypriot second-level football league. AEP Paphos won their 2nd title.

== Format ==
Fourteen teams participated in the 2007–08 Cypriot Second Division. All teams played against each other twice, once at their home and once away. The team with the most points at the end of the season crowned champions. The first three teams were promoted to 2008–09 Cypriot First Division and the last three teams were relegated to the 2008–09 Cypriot Third Division.

== Changes from previous season ==
Teams promoted to 2007–08 Cypriot First Division

- APOP Kinyras
- Alki Larnaca
- Doxa Katokopias

Teams relegated from 2006–07 Cypriot First Division

- Digenis Akritas Morphou
- Ayia Napa
- AEP Paphos

Teams promoted from 2006–07 Cypriot Third Division

- Ermis Aradippou
- Atromitos Yeroskipou
- Olympos Xylofagou

Teams relegated to 2007–08 Cypriot Third Division

- Chalkanoras Idaliou
- Iraklis Gerolakkou
- AEM Mesogis

== League standings ==
Pos	Team	Pld	W	D	L	GF	GA	GD	Pts	Promotion or relegation
1	AEP Paphos (C)	26	17	3	6	46	22	+24	54	Promoted to Cypriot First Division
2	APEP	26	15	6	5	45	26	+19	51	Promoted to Cypriot First Division
3	Atromitos Yeroskipou	26	13	7	6	41	23	+18	46 (Note: Atromitos 4–0 Digenis; Digenis 2–0 Atromitos)	Promoted to Cypriot First Division
4	Digenis Morphou	26	14	4	8	44	26	+18	46	
5	Ermis Aradippou	26	11	5	10	51	43	+8	38 (Note: Ermis 1–1 Onisilos; Onisilos 0–3 Ermis)	
6	Onisilos Sotira	26	9	11	6	32	23	+9	38	
7	Ayia Napa	26	9	7	10	32	32	0	34	
8	Omonia Aradippou	26	8	9	9	25	24	+1	33	
9	ASIL Lysi	26	8	8	10	20	24	−4	32	
10	THOI Lakatamia	26	8	7	11	28	40	−12	31 (Note: THOI 2–0 MEAP; MEAP 2–1 THOI)	
11	MEAP Nisou	26	9	4	13	32	49	−17	31	
12	Anagennisi Deryneia	26	8	6	12	21	35	−14	30	Relegated to Cypriot Third Division
13	Akritas Chlorakas	26	5	7	14	22	39	−17	22	Relegated to Cypriot Third Division
14	Olympos Xylofagou	26	4	4	18	23	56	−33	16	Relegated to Cypriot Third Division

Rules for classification: 1) points; 2) head-to-head points; 3) head-to-head goal difference; 4) head-to-head away goals scored; 5) goal difference; 6) number of goals scored.
(C) Champions

== Results ==
Home \ Away	ANP	AEP	AKR	ANG	APP	ASL	ATR	DGN	ERM	THL	MPN	OMN	ONS	OLX
Ayia Napa		2–1	6–0	1–0	1–3	2–0	1–4	1–0	2–3	1–1	3–0	1–1	0–0	4–1
AEP Paphos F.C.	3–0		4–1	3–0	0–3	3–1	3–1	0–2	2–1	2–0	4–1	3–1	2–0	3–1
Akritas	1–2	0–2		2–0	0–1	0–1	0–1	0–2	1–3	1–1	3–0	1–0	1–1	4–0
Anagennisi	3–1	0–1	0–0		3–2	0–0	1–2	0–0	2–1	0–0	1–0	1–0	0–0	0–0
APEP	2–0	1–0	3–1	3–2		2–0	2–2	2–1	2–0	3–0	2–2	1–1	2–0	2–0
ASIL	1–1	0–1	1–0	3–0	0–0		0–0	0–0	1–0	2–0	2–0	2–4	0–1	1–2
Atromitos	1–0	0–1	0–1	2–0	0–0	0–0		4–0	3–3	2–3	2–0	2–0	1–1	0–0
Digenis	2–0	0–1	1–1	3–1	1–4	2–0	2–0		1–0	3–2	0–1	0–1	2–1	4–0
Ermis	1–2	3–0	1–1	3–1	3–2	2–2	2–1	1–2		3–2	6–3	0–1	1–1	3–1
THOI	0–0	1–1	1–1	2–0	2–0	0–1	0–4	2–4	1–1		2–0	2–0	1–0	1–0
MEAP	1–0	1–1	4–2	1–2	4–0	0–1	0–2	0–8	3–1	2–1		1–0	1–1	4–2
Omonia	0–0	0–0	0–0	0–1	1–2	1–1	1–3	1–0	4–1	4–0	2–1		0–0	1–1
Onisilos	2–0	2–0	2–0	4–1	1–1	1–0	2–3	1–1	0–3	3–0	1–1	0–0		4–0
Olympos	1–1	0–5	2–0	1–2	1–0	2–0	0–1	2–3	2–5	2–3	0–1	0–1	2–3	

Updated to match(es) played on unknown. Source:
Legend: Blue = home team win; Yellow = draw; Red = away team win.

== See also ==
- Cypriot Second Division
- 2007–08 Cypriot First Division
- 2007–08 Cypriot Cup
- 2007–08 in Cypriot football

== Sources ==
- "2007/08 Cypriot Second Division". Rec.Sport.Soccer Statistics Foundation. 2016-01-14.
- "2. DIVISION 2007–08". Soccerway. Archived from the original on March 21, 2021.
