= Nuno Morais =

Portuguese footballer

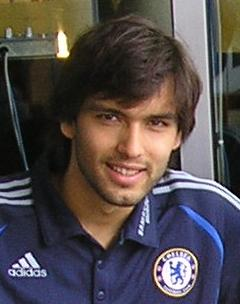
- Morais as a Chelsea player

Personal information
- Full name: Nuno Miguel Barbosa Morais
- Date of birth: 29 January 1984 (age 42)
- Place of birth: Penafiel, Portugal
- Height: 1.85 m (6 ft 1 in)
- Positions: Defensive midfielder; centre-back

Team information
- Current team: Pafos (assistant)

Youth career
- 1994–2002: Penafiel

Senior career*
Years	Team	Apps	(Gls)
2002–2004	Penafiel	49	(2)
2004–2007	Chelsea	4	(0)
2005–2006	→ Marítimo (loan)	17	(0)
2007–2019	APOEL	347	(44)
Total		417	(46)

International career
2004	Portugal U20	3	(0)
2004–2006	Portugal U21	14	(0)
2006	Portugal B	1	(0)

Managerial career
- 2020–2021: APOEL (assistant)
- 2021–2023: APOEL (youth)
- 2023–2024: APOEL (assistant)
- 2024: Raja CA (assistant)
- 2025–2026: Esteghlal (assistant)
- 2026–: Pafos (assistant)
- * Club domestic league appearances and goals

Nuno Miguel Barbosa Morais (born 29 January 1984) is a Portuguese former professional footballer. Mainly a defensive midfielder, he could also appear as a central defender.

He was signed by Chelsea in 2004, but stayed only two years with the club, going on to spend the vast majority of his career with APOEL and win 16 major titles, including nine Cypriot First Division championships.

== Career ==
=== Chelsea ===
Born in Penafiel, Porto District, Morais started his career at his hometown club F.C. Penafiel, but in August 2004 was signed by England's Chelsea for an undisclosed fee on a three-year contract, after a successful trial period. He made his debut for the latter in an FA Cup win against Scunthorpe United in January 2005, playing the full 90 minutes. His first Premier League appearance occurred on 10 May, as a late substitute in a 3–1 away victory over Manchester United.

Due to the fact that Morais struggled to get first team action in his first season, he was loaned to C.S. Marítimo in 2005–06, alongside compatriot Filipe Oliveira. In that summer, he appeared twice for the Portuguese under-21s at the 2006 UEFA European Under-21 Championship on home soil, with Oliveira.

=== APOEL ===
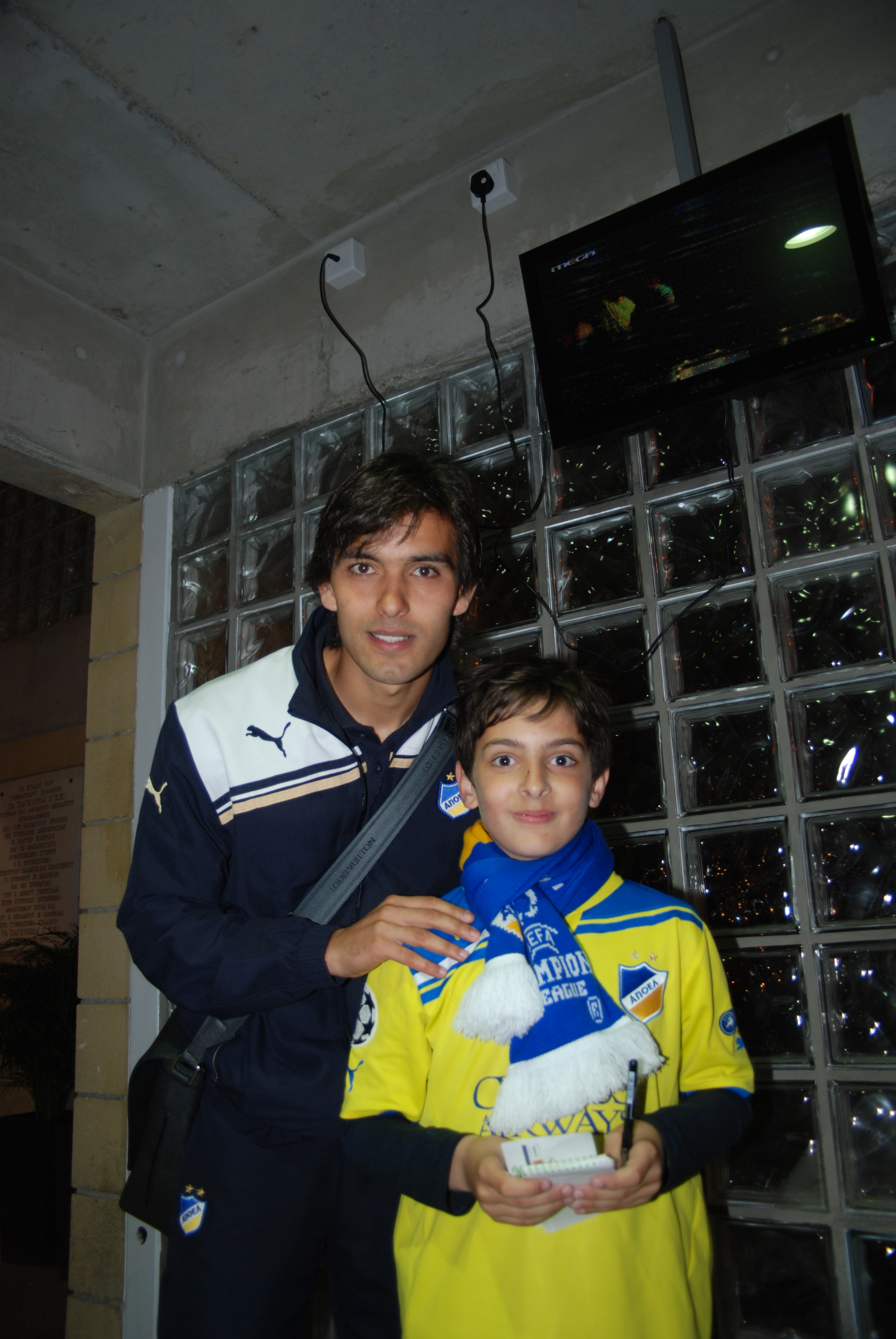
Morais at APOEL

Returning to Chelsea, Morais only appeared twice in the league, totalling less than 20 minutes in home draws against Manchester United and Everton and playing three times between the FA Cup and the Football League Cup. On 11 May 2007, he signed a two-year deal with Cypriot champions APOEL FC on a free transfer.

Morais was converted to a defensive midfielder during his time in Nicosia, and signed a new contract until June 2012. Since his debut he was an essential defensive unit as the side won, amongst other trophies, nine championships, three cups and four super cups; he also appeared in all six group-stage matches of the club in its first participation in the UEFA Champions League.

In the 2011–12 Champions League, Morais was an undisputed starter for the side as they reached the quarter-finals for the first time ever, playing all ten fixtures – including the round-of-16 defeat of Olympique Lyonnais where he converted his attempt in the penalty shootout. On 4 May 2012, he agreed to a three-year extension to his link.

During 2013–14, Morais appeared in every group stage game in APOEL's UEFA Europa League campaign, and scored the 2–1 winner against FC Girondins de Bordeaux at GSP Stadium. The following season, he was also first-choice in his team's Champions League campaign.

On 7 May 2016, following a league match against Apollon Limassol FC, Morais reached 251 for APOEL and became the foreigner with the most appearances in the history of the Cypriot top division. On 16 August, after playing against F.C. Copenhagen in the Champions League play-off round, he reached a club-best 81 games in European competitions.

Morais retired in July 2019, at the age of 35. He finished his career as APOEL's highest appearance maker of all time, with 524 matches to his name. Following his retirement, he remained at his main club as the youth team coach and assistant manager, joining the coaching team of compatriot Ricardo Sá Pinto in June 2023.

== Career statistics ==
Club	Season	League			National Cup		League Cup		Continental		Other (Note: Appearance in Cypriot Super Cup)		Total	
Club	Season	Division	Apps	Goals	Apps	Goals	Apps	Goals	Apps	Goals	Apps	Goals	Apps	Goals
Penafiel	2002–03	Liga de Honra	17	0	2	1	—		—		—		19	1
Penafiel	2003–04	Liga de Honra	32	2	3	0	—		—		—		35	2
Penafiel	Total		49	2	5	1	—		—		—		54	3
Chelsea	2004–05	Premier League	2	0	1	0	0	0	1	0	—		4	0
Marítimo	2005–06	Primeira Liga	17	0	3	0	—		—		—		20	0
Marítimo	Total		17	0	3	0	—		—		—		20	0
Chelsea	2006–07	Premier League	2	0	2	0	1	0	0	0	0	0	5	0
Chelsea	Total		4	0	3	0	1	0	1	0	0	0	9	0
APOEL	2007–08	Cypriot First Division	13	0	8	1	—		2	0	—		23	1
APOEL	2008–09	Cypriot First Division	30	3	5	0	—		6	0	1	0	42	3
APOEL	2009–10	Cypriot First Division	29	1	5	0	—		11	0	1	0	46	1
APOEL	2010–11	Cypriot First Division	30	0	2	0	—		3	0	—		35	0
APOEL	2011–12	Cypriot First Division	28	1	3	2	—		16	1	1	0	48	4
APOEL	2012–13	Cypriot First Division	27	4	2	0	—		6	0	—		35	4
APOEL	2013–14	Cypriot First Division	34	5	7	0	—		10	1	1	0	52	6
APOEL	2014–15	Cypriot First Division	27	2	6	0	—		10	0	1	0	44	2
APOEL	2015–16	Cypriot First Division	34	3	6	1	—		12	0	1	0	53	4
APOEL	2016–17	Cypriot First Division	33	3	7	0	—		15	0	1	0	56	3
APOEL	2017–18	Cypriot First Division	34	9	0	0	—		12	0	1	0	47	9
APOEL	2018–19	Cypriot First Division	28	13	6	0	—		8	2	1	0	43	15
APOEL	Total		347	44	57	4	—		111	4	9	0	524	52
Career total			417	46	68	5	1	0	112	4	9	0	607	55

== Honours ==
Chelsea

- FA Cup: 2006–07
- Football League Cup: 2006–07

APOEL

- Cypriot First Division: 2008–09, 2010–11, 2012–13, 2013–14, 2014–15, 2015–16, 2016–17, 2017–18, 2018–19
- Cypriot Cup: 2007–08, 2013–14, 2014–15
- Cypriot Super Cup: 2008, 2009, 2011, 2013
