= Bernardo Vasconcelos =

Portuguese footballer

Personal information
- Full name: Bernardo Lino Castro Paes Vasconcelos
- Date of birth: 10 June 1979 (age 47)
- Place of birth: Lisbon, Portugal
- Height: 1.87 m (6 ft 2 in)
- Position: Striker

Youth career
- 1994–1997: Dramático Cascais
- 1997–1998: Estoril

Senior career*
Years	Team	Apps	(Gls)
1998–1999	Dramático Cascais		
1999–2000	Palmelense		
2000–2001	Benfica B	12	(1)
2001–2002	Torreense	27	(16)
2002–2003	Alverca	13	(1)
2003	Torreense	20	(12)
2004	RKC	17	(4)
2004	União Leiria	2	(0)
2005	RKC	15	(1)
2005–2006	Estoril	18	(4)
2006–2009	APOP	66	(41)
2008	→ Omonia (loan)	9	(3)
2009–2010	AEP	18	(7)
2010	Hapoel Be'er Sheva	13	(1)
2011	AEP	14	(7)
2011–2013	Alki Larnaca	47	(22)
2013–2014	Zawisza Bydgoszcz	30	(8)
2015	Doxa	6	(1)
2015–2016	Oriental	3	(1)
Total		330	(131)
- * Club domestic league appearances and goals

Bernardo Lino Castro Paes Vasconcelos (born 10 June 1979) is a Portuguese former professional footballer who played as a striker.

In a professional career which spanned nearly 15 years, he played mostly in Cyprus, representing five teams.

== Club career ==
=== Portugal / Holland ===
Born in Lisbon, Vasconcelos played for three teams early in his career, including the reserves of local club S.L. Benfica. In the 2002–03 season he helped F.C. Alverca return to the Primeira Liga after one year of absence, scoring once and appearing in less than half of the league's matches.

In January 2004, after solid performances with S.C.U. Torreense in the third division, Vasconcelos moved to the Netherlands and signed with RKC Waalwijk in the Eredivisie, netting four goals to help the North Brabant side retain their top-level status. Subsequently, he returned to his country with U.D. Leiria, for what would be his only Portuguese top flight experience – after only two matches (36 minutes), he returned to his previous team in the following transfer window.

=== Cyprus ===
Vasconcelos left RKC in the summer of 2005, then played one year in Portugal with G.D. Estoril Praia. He then moved to Cyprus and signed for APOP Kinyras FC, scoring at an impressive rate in the division two and adding 12 in 26 games in his first season in the Cypriot First Division, which he split between APOP and AC Omonia.

Vasconcelos returned to APOP for the 2008–09 campaign, helping the team win the domestic cup as he netted in the semi-finals against APOEL FC. Afterwards, he left the club but remained in the Paphos District, signing for AEP Paphos FC.

In the 2010 off-season, Vasconcelos joined Hapoel Be'er Sheva F.C. in Israel, but he returned to former side AEP Paphos in January of the following year. He scored seven goals in only 14 appearances, but they suffered relegation from the top tier.

In June 2011, Vasconcelos signed for Alki Larnaca FC. He was crowned the league's top scorer in his second year at 18 goals, but the team could only rank ninth.

After a stint in Poland with Zawisza Bydgoszcz, Vasconcelos returned to Cyprus in late 2014 by signing a one-and-a-half-year contract with Doxa Katokopias FC.

== Club statistics ==
Appearances and goals by club, season and competition
Club	Season	League			Cup		Continental		Total	
Club	Season	Division	Apps	Goals	Apps	Goals	Apps	Goals	Apps	Goals
Benfica B	2000–01	Portuguese Second Division	12	1	—		—		12	1
Torreense	2001–02	Portuguese Second Division	27	16	0	0	—		27	16
Alverca	2002–03	Segunda Liga	13	1	1	0	—		14	1
Torreense	2003–04	Portuguese Second Division	20	12	1	0	—		21	12
RKC	2003–04	Eredivisie	17	4			—		17	4
União Leiria	2004–05	Primeira Liga	2	0	0	0	—		2	0
RKC	2004–05	Eredivisie	15	1			—		15	1
Estoril	2005–06	Primeira Liga	18	4	1	0	—		19	4
APOP	2006–07	Cypriot First Division	24	22			—		24	22
APOP	2007–08	Cypriot First Division	17	9			—		17	9
APOP	2008–09	Cypriot First Division	25	10			—		25	10
APOP	Total		66	41			—		66	41
Omonia (loan)	2007–08	Cypriot First Division	9	3			1 (Note: Appearance in UEFA Cup/UEFA Europa League)	0	10	3
AEP	2009–10	Cypriot First Division	18	8			—		18	8
Hapoel Be'er Sheva	2010–11	Israeli Premier League	13	1	0	0	—		13	1
AEP	2010–11	Cypriot First Division	14	7	0	0	—		14	7
Alki Larnaca	2011–12	Cypriot First Division	23	4	3	1	—		26	5
Alki Larnaca	2012–13	Cypriot First Division	24	18	2	1	—		26	19
Alki Larnaca	Total		47	22	5	2	—		52	24
Zawisza Bydgoszcz	2013–14	Ekstraklasa	22	7	3	1	—		25	8
Zawisza Bydgoszcz	2014–15	Ekstraklasa	8	1	1	0	2	0	11	1
Zawisza Bydgoszcz	Total		30	8	4	1	2	0	36	9
Doxa	2014–15	Cypriot First Division	6	1	1	0	—		7	1
Oriental	2015–16	Segunda Liga	3	1	2	2	—		5	3
Career total			330	131	15	5	3	0	348	136

== Honours ==
APOP Kinyras

- Cypriot Cup: 2008–09

Zawisza Bydgoszcz

- Polish Cup: 2013–14
- Polish Super Cup: 2014

Individual

- Cypriot First Division top scorer: 2012–13
