= 2008–09 Cypriot First Division =

Marfin Laiki League
- Season: 2008–09
- Champions: APOEL; 20th title
- Relegated: Alki; AEK; Atromitos
- Champions League: APOEL
- Europa League: Omonia; Anorthosis; APOP Kinyras
- Matches: 218
- Goals: 612 (2.81 per match)
- Top goalscorer: Serjão (24 goals)
- Biggest home win: Omonia 7–1 Enosis; Apollon 7–1 Alki
- Biggest away win: Atromitos 1–6 Anorthosis; Atromitos 0–5 Omonia
- Highest scoring: Atromitos 3–6 Apollon

The 2008–09 Cypriot First Division was the seventy season of top-tier football on Cyprus. It started on 30 August 2008 and ended on 10 May 2009. The defending champions were Anorthosis.

APOEL won the championship three matchweeks before the end of the season.

This year, for the second time, the championship also featured a group stage play-off system. Teams were divided into 3 groups: 1st–4th, 5th–8th and 9th–12th. Points from the main part of the season still counted.

== Format ==
Fourteen teams participated in the 2008–09 Cypriot First Division. Each team played against every other team twice, once at home and once away, for a total of 26 matches. After these matches, the two teams with the worst records were relegated to the 2009–10 Cypriot Second Division. The remaining twelve teams were divided into three groups: 1st-4th, 5th-8th and 9th-12th.

The teams ranked first through fourth played out the champion and the participants for the European competitions. Teams ranked ninth through 12th determined the third relegated club, while the remaining four teams played a placement round. Every team played twice against its group opponents. Regular season records are carried over without any modifications.

The champions ensured their participation in the 2009–10 UEFA Champions League and the runners-up and the third team in the 2009–10 UEFA Europa League.

=== Point system ===
Teams received three points for a win, one point for a draw and zero points for a loss.

== Stadia and locations ==
2008–09 Cypriot First Division

Team	Stadium
AEK Larnaca	GSZ Stadium
AEL Limassol	Tsirion Stadium
AEP Paphos	Pafiako Stadium
Alki Larnaca	Ammochostos Stadium
Anorthosis Famagusta	Antonis Papadopoulos Stadium
APEP	Tsirion Stadium
APOEL	GSP Stadium
Apollon Limassol	Tsirion Stadium
APOP Kinyras	Peyia Municipal Stadium
Atromitos Yeroskipou	Pafiako Stadium
Doxa Katokopias	Makario Stadium
Ethnikos Achna	Dasaki Stadium
ENP	Paralimni Stadium
Omonia	GSP Stadium

== Promotion and relegation ==
Teams promoted from 2007-08 Cypriot Second Division:

- Champions: AE Paphos
- Runners-up: APEP
- 3rd placed team: Atromitos

Teams relegated to 2008–09 Cypriot Second Division :

- Aris Limassol
- Nea Salamina
- Olympiakos Nicosia

== Overview ==
Team	Head Coach	Team Captain	Venue	Capacity	Kitmaker	Shirt sponsor	Club Chairman
AEK Larnaca	(Cyprus) Savvas Constantinou	(Cyprus) Constantinos Mina	Neo GSZ Stadium	13,032	Mass	CytaVision	Marios Ellinas
AEL Limassol	(Romania) Mihai Stoichiţă	(Cyprus) Simos Krassas	Tsirion Stadium	13,331	Mass	Sinergatiko Tamieftirio Lemesou	Andreas Sofokleous
AEP Paphos	(Israel) Nir Klinger	(Cyprus) Giorgos Georgiou	Pafiako Stadium	10,000	Mass	Eurolink Investment Group	Fillippos Georgiou
Alki Larnaca	(Cyprus) Panikos Xiourouppas	(Venezuela) Andrés Rouga	Ammochostos Stadium	5,500	Legea	TEAM A Security	Demetris Phantousis
Anorthosis Famagusta	(Cyprus) Michalis Pamboris	(Cyprus) Nikos Nicolaou	Antonis Papadopoulos Stadium	10,003	Puma	Quality Group Developments	Chris Georgiades
APEP Pitsilia	(Netherlands) Willy Scheepers	(Uruguay) Bruno Piano	Tsirion Stadium	13,331	Mass	KKCG	Panayiotis Neokleous
APOEL	(Serbia) Ivan Jovanović	(Cyprus) Marinos Satsias	GSP Stadium	22,859	Lotto	MTN Group	Foivos Erotokritou
Apollon Limassol	(Germany) Thomas von Heesen	(Cyprus) Christos Theophilou	Tsirion Stadium	13,331	Lotto	Columbia Ship Management	Theodoros Antoniou
APOP Kinyras Peyias	(Cyprus) Giorgos Polyviou	(Greece) Giannis Sfakianakis	Peyia Municipal Stadium	3,828	Puma	PrimeTel	Michalis Mitas
Atromitos Yeroskipou	(Cyprus) Sofoklis Sofokleous	(Cyprus) Argyris Petrou	Pafiako Stadium	10,000	Umbro	SPE Yeroskipou	Vangelis Genis
Doxa Katokopia	(Cyprus) Pambos Christodoulou	(Cyprus) Kyriacos Polykarpou	Makario Stadium	16,000	Puma	Yiannakas Real Estate Ltd	Charalambos Argyrou
Enosis Neon Paralimni	(Cyprus) Adamos Adamou & Antonis Kleftis	(Cyprus) Demos Goumenos	Paralimni Stadium	5,800	Lotto	Elian Developers	Adamos Loizou
Ethnikos Achna	(Belgium) Stéphane Demol	(Cyprus) Christos Poyiatzis	Dasaki Stadium	7,000	Nike	Famagusta Developers	Kikis Philippou
Omonia	(Greece) Takis Lemonis	(Cyprus) Kostas Kaiafas	GSP Stadium	22,859	Lotto	Ocean Tankers	Miltiadis Neophytou

=== Managerial changes ===
Team	Outgoing manager	Manner of departure	Date of vacancy	Replaced by	Date of appointment
Omonia	(Cyprus) Giorgos Savvidis	Resigned	4 March 2008	(Bosnia and Herzegovina) Nedim Tutić	4 March 2008
Apollon	(Israel) Yossi Mizrahi	Mutual consent	11 May 2008	(Serbia) Svetozar Šapurić	23 May 2008
Ethnikos	(Serbia) Svetozar Šapurić	Mutual consent	23 May 2008	(Belgium) Stéphane Demol	24 May 2008
Apollon	(Serbia) Svetozar Šapurić	Sacked	9 September 2008	(Germany) Thomas von Heesen	15 September 2008
AEK	(Israel) Nir Klinger	Sacked	27 October 2008	(Greece) Makis Katsavakis	28 October 2008
AEP	(Cyprus) Savvas Constantinou	Resigned	3 November 2008	(Israel) Nir Klinger	5 November 2008
APOP	(Bulgaria) Eduard Eranosyan	Sacked	27 November 2008	(Cyprus) Giorgos Polyviou	27 November 2008
AEK	(Greece) Makis Katsavakis	Resigned	2 December 2008	(Cyprus) Loizos Stefani	2 December 2008
Enosis	(Cyprus) Marios Constantinou	Resigned	7 December 2008	(Cyprus) Panayiotis Xiourouppas	8 December 2008
Alki	(Cyprus) Christos Kassianos	Resigned	17 December 2008	(Cyprus) Panayiotis Xiourouppas	7 January 2009
AEK	(Cyprus) Loizos Stefani	Mutual consent	18 December 2008	(Cyprus) Christos Kassianos	18 December 2008
Enosis	(Cyprus) Panayiotis Xiourouppas	Mutual consent	29 December 2008	(Bulgaria) Eduard Eranosyan	30 December 2008
AEK	(Cyprus) Christos Kassianos	Resigned	15 January 2009	(Cyprus) Savvas Constantinou	15 January 2009
AEL	(Cyprus) Andreas Michaelides	Mutual consent	26 January 2009	(Romania) Mihai Stoichiţă	27 January 2009
Enosis	(Bulgaria) Eduard Eranosyan	Resigned	28 January 2009	(Cyprus) Adamos Adamou & Antonis Kleftis	29 January 2009
Omonia	(Bosnia and Herzegovina) Nedim Tutić	Sacked	16 March 2009	(Greece) Takis Lemonis	17 March 2009
APEP	(Cyprus) Tasos Kyriacou	Sacked	5 April 2009	(Netherlands) Willy Scheepers	5 April 2009
Anorthosis	(Georgia (country)) Temuri Ketsbaia	Resigned	13 April 2009	(Cyprus) Michalis Pamboris	13 April 2009

== First round ==
=== League table ===
Pos	Team	Pld	W	D	L	GF	GA	GD	Pts	Qualification or relegation
1	APOEL	26	22	3	1	53	14	+39	69	Qualification for second round, Group A
2	Omonia Nicosia	26	21	1	4	61	18	+43	64	Qualification for second round, Group A
3	Anorthosis Famagusta	26	20	2	4	49	19	+30	62	Qualification for second round, Group A
4	AEL Limassol	26	13	4	9	34	30	+4	43 (Note: AEL 1–0 APOL; APOL 1–3 AEL)	Qualification for second round, Group A
5	Apollon Limassol	26	13	4	9	53	34	+19	43	Qualification for second round, Group B
6	APOP Kinyras	26	12	4	10	35	35	0	40 (Note: ETH 1–4 APOP; APOP 1–2 ETH)	Qualification for second round, Group B
7	Ethnikos Achna	26	11	7	8	34	32	+2	40	Qualification for second round, Group B
8	Doxa Katokopias	26	8	7	11	37	39	−2	31	Qualification for second round, Group B
9	AEP Paphos	26	5	12	9	30	38	−8	27	Qualification for second round, Group C
10	Enosis Neon Paralimni	26	6	7	13	23	43	−20	25	Qualification for second round, Group C
11	APEP	26	5	8	13	28	44	−16	23	Qualification for second round, Group C
12	Alki Larnaca	26	4	7	15	27	50	−23	19	Qualification for second round, Group C
13	AEK Larnaca (R)	26	3	6	17	27	45	−18	15	Relegation to Cypriot Second Division
14	Atromitos (R)	26	1	4	21	19	69	−50	7	Relegation to Cypriot Second Division

Source: cfa.com.cy (in Greek)
Rules for classification: 1) points; 2) head-to-head points; 3) head-to-head goal difference; 4) head-to-head goals scored; 5) goal difference; 6) number of goals scored.
Teams qualified for Group A played out one spot in the second qualifying round of the UEFA Champions League and two spots in the UEFA Europa League, one in the second and one in the first qualifying round.
A spot in the third qualifying round of UEFA Europa League was awarded to the winners of the 2008–09 Cypriot Cup.
Teams qualified for Group C played out one additional relegation spot.
Points gained in the First round were taken over into the Second round groups.
(R) Relegated

=== Results ===
Home \ Away	AEK	AEL	AEP	ALK	ANO	APEP	APOE	APOL	APOP	ATR	DOX	ENP	ETH	OMO
AEK Larnaca		2–0 (Note: The match of Round 8 was awarded to AEK with a score of 2–0 after being abandoned due to crowd violence.)	1–1	1–1	1–3	0–2	0–1	1–5	1–2	5–0	2–2	2–2	1–1	2–5
AEL Limassol	1–0		2–1	2–2	0–2	0–0	0–1	1–0	1–1	2–1	2–1	1–1	2–0	0–2
AEP Paphos	0–3	0–1		5–2	2–2	1–1	2–2	1–2	2–2	1–0	2–1	0–2	0–0	2–3
Alki Larnaca	1–0	1–2	2–2		0–2	3–1	1–0	0–3	1–3	2–2	1–2	2–1	0–1	0–1
Anorthosis Famagusta	1–0	2–1	0–0	2–1		3–0	1–2	2–1	2–0	3–0	2–0	1–0	2–1	1–2
APEP	1–0	0–1	0–1	2–1	1–2		1–1	1–2	0–1	2–1	3–3	0–0	2–2	1–3
APOEL	2–0	4–0	4–1	3–1	1–0	4–0		4–1	1–0	4–0	3–2	1–0	3–0	3–2
Apollon Limassol	1–0	1–3	4–1	7–1	1–2	1–1	0–1		3–1	2–1	0–2 (Note: The match of Round 12 was awarded to Doxa with a score of 2–0 after being abandoned due to crowd violence.)	4–0	2–1	0–2 (Note: The match of Round 3 was awarded to Omonia with a score of 2–0 after being abandoned due to crowd violence.)
APOP Kinyras	2–0 (Note: The match of Round 1 was awarded to APOP with a score of 2–0 after being abandoned due to crowd violence.)	1–3	0–0	1–0	0–3	1–0	1–2	1–1		3–1	2–1	1–3	1–2	2–0
Atromitos	1–0	0–3	2–2	1–1	1–6	1–5	0–1	3–6	0–2		1–5	1–1	0–1	0–5
Doxa Katokopias	2–2	3–2	1–0	1–1	0–1	3–2	0–2	2–2	2–0	2–1		0–1	0–0	1–2
Enosis Neon Paralimni	2–1	0–3	0–0	1–1	0–3	4–0	0–1	0–3	1–2	1–0	1–1		0–4	0–2
Ethnikos Achna	2–1	3–1	1–3	2–1	0–1	2–2	1–1	1–1	1–4	2–1	2–0	2–1		2–1
Omonia Nicosia	4–1	1–0	0–0	2–0	4–0	3–0	0–1	1–0	4–1	2–0	2–0	7–1	1–0	

Source: cfa.com.cy (in Greek)
Legend: Blue = home team win; Yellow = draw; Red = away team win.

== Second round ==
=== Group A ===
==== Table ====
Pos	Team	Pld	W	D	L	GF	GA	GD	Pts	Qualification
1	APOEL (C)	32	26	4	2	62	17	+45	82	Qualification for Champions League second qualifying round
2	Omonia Nicosia	32	25	1	6	70	22	+48	76	Qualification for Europa League second qualifying round
3	Anorthosis Famagusta	32	21	4	7	52	26	+26	67	Qualification for Europa League first qualifying round
4	AEL Limassol	32	13	5	14	38	41	−3	44	

Source: cfa.com.cy (in Greek)
Rules for classification: 1) points; 2) head-to-head points; 3) head-to-head goal difference; 4) head-to-head goals scored; 5) goal difference; 6) number of goals scored.
(C) Champions

==== Results ====
Home \ Away	AEL	ANO	APOE	OMO
AEL Limassol		1–1	0–1	2–3
Anorthosis Famagusta	1–0		1–1	0–2
APOEL	3–1	2–0		SUSP (Note: The match of last round between APOEL and Omonia was suspended after the first half due to violent behaviour of both teams' fans and their mutual conflict. Disciplinary Committee later decided that the final result of the match is forfeit of both teams.)
Omonia Nicosia	2–0	1–0	1–2	

Source: cfa.com.cy (in Greek)
Legend: Blue = home team win; Yellow = draw; Red = away team win.

=== Group B ===
==== Table ====
Pos	Team	Pld	W	D	L	GF	GA	GD	Pts	Qualification
5	Apollon Limassol	32	17	6	9	68	42	+26	57	
6	Ethnikos Achna	32	13	8	11	47	45	+2	47	
7	APOP Kinyras (Note: APOP were docked 6 points due to unpaid debts.)	32	13	6	13	45	49	−4	39	Qualification for Europa League third qualifying round (Note: APOP won the 2008–09 Cypriot Cup and qualified for the third qualifying round of the UEFA Europa League.)
8	Doxa Katokopias	32	10	8	14	46	51	−5	38	

Source: cfa.com.cy (in Greek)
Rules for classification: 1) points; 2) head-to-head points; 3) head-to-head goal difference; 4) head-to-head goals scored; 5) goal difference; 6) number of goals scored.

==== Results ====
Home \ Away	APOL	APOP	DOX	ETH
Apollon Limassol		3–2	3–1	2–0
APOP Kinyras	2–2		1–0	1–4
Doxa Katokopias	1–1	3–2		2–5
Ethnikos Achna	2–4	2–2	0–2	

Source: cfa.com.cy (in Greek)
Legend: Blue = home team win; Yellow = draw; Red = away team win.

=== Group C ===
==== Table ====
Pos	Team	Pld	W	D	L	GF	GA	GD	Pts	Qualification or relegation
9	AEP Paphos	32	7	15	10	39	44	−5	36	
10	Enosis Neon Paralimni	32	8	8	16	27	51	−24	32	
11	APEP	32	7	10	15	33	51	−18	31	
12	Alki Larnaca (R)	32	6	9	17	39	59	−20	27	Relegation to Cypriot Second Division

Source: cfa.com.cy (in Greek)
Rules for classification: 1) points; 2) head-to-head points; 3) head-to-head goal difference; 4) head-to-head goals scored; 5) goal difference; 6) number of goals scored.
(R) Relegated

==== Results ====
Home \ Away	AEP	ALK	APEP	ENP
AEP Paphos		3–4	1–1	3–0
Alki Larnaca	1–1		1–1	1–2
APEP	0–1	0–4		2–0
Enosis Neon Paralimni	0–0	2–1	0–1	

Source: cfa.com.cy (in Greek)
Legend: Blue = home team win; Yellow = draw; Red = away team win.

== Top goalscorers ==
Source: soccerway.com (First round, Second round)

Rank	Player	Club	Goals
1	(Brazil) Serjão	Doxa	24
2	(Argentina) Gastón Sangoy	Apollon	22
3	(Iran) Ferydoon Zandi	Alki	12
4	(Cyprus) Yiasoumis Yiasoumi	Ethnikos	11
4	(Poland) Marcin Żewłakow	APOEL	11
6	(Cyprus) Demetris Christofi	Omonia	10
6	(Brazil) Gelson	APEP	10
6	(Poland) Łukasz Sosin	Anorthosis	10
6	(Portugal) Bernardo Vasconcelos	APOP	10
10	(Nigeria) Haruna Babangida	Apollon	9
10	(Belgium) Fangio Buyse	APOP	9
10	(Cyprus) Kyriacos Chailis	AEP	9
10	(Cyprus) Ioannis Okkas	Omonia	9

== Season statistics ==
=== Scoring ===
- First goal of the season: Peter Ofori-Quaye for AEL against Apollon, 2nd minute (30 August 2008)
- Fastest goal in a match: 47 seconds – Demetris Christofi for Omonia against Alki (29 December 2008)
- Goal scored at the latest point in a match: 90+3 minutes
  - Klodian Duro for Omonia against APOP (14 December 2008)
  - Chrysis Michael for APOEL against AEL (22 March 2009)
- Goal scored at the latest point in a match: 90+2 minutes
  - Francisco Aguirre for Omonia against Atromitos (27 September 2008)
  - Nikolaos Frousos for Anorthosis against APOP (31 October 2008)
  - Tinga for AEP against Alki (21 December 2008)
- Widest winning margin:
  - 6 goals – Omonia 7–1 Enosis (22 December 2008)
  - 6 goals – Apollon 7–1 Alki (25 January 2009)
- Most goals in a match: 9 goals – Atromitos 3–6 Apollon (8 February 2009)
- Most goals in one half: 5 goals – APOEL 3–2 Doxa (31 August 2008)
- First own goal of the season: Mahamadou Sidibè (Ethnikos) for AEL, 50 minutes (2 November 2008)
- First hat-trick of the season: Ioannis Okkas (Omonia) against AEK (6 December 2008)
- Fastest hat trick of the season: 14 minutes – Klodian Duro (Omonia) against APOP (14 December 2008)

=== Discipline ===
- First yellow card of the season: Levan Maghradze for Apollon against AEL, 11th minute (30 August 2008)
- First red card of the season: Levan Maghradze for Apollon against AEL, 78th minute (30 August 2008)
- Most yellow cards in a single match: 9 – Apollon 1–3 AEL – 4 for Apollon (Levan Maghradze (2), Christos Marangos & Gastón Sangoy) and 5 for AEL (Panos Constantinou, Dušan Kerkez, Peter Ofori-Quaye, Laurent Fassotte & Silvio Augusto González) (30 August 2008)
- Most red cards in a single match: 3 – AEP 2–3 Omonia – 2 for AEP (Almir Tanjič & Jefisley André Caldeira) and 1 for Omonia (Aleksandar Pantić)
- Card given at latest point in a game: Aleksandar Pantić (red) at 90+2' for Omonia against AEP (30 November 2008)

== See also ==
- 2008–09 Cypriot Cup
- 2008–09 Cypriot Second Division
- List of Cypriot football transfers summer 2008

== Sources ==
- "2008/09 Cypriot First Division". Rec.Sport.Soccer Statistics Foundation. 2016-01-14.
