= 2007–08 Cypriot Cup =

Tournament details
- Country: Cyprus
- Dates: 8 September 2007 – 17 May 2008
- Teams: 54

Final positions
- Champions: APOEL (19th title)
- Runners-up: Anorthosis

The 2007–08 Cypriot Cup was the 66th edition of the Cypriot Cup. A total of 54 clubs entered the competition. It began on 8 September 2007 with the first round and concluded on 17 May 2008 with the final which was held at GSP Stadium. APOEL won their 19th Cypriot Cup trophy after beating Anorthosis 2–0 in the final.

== Format ==
In the 2007–08 Cypriot Cup, participated all the teams of the Cypriot First Division, the Cypriot Second Division, the Cypriot Third Division and 12 of the 14 teams of the Cypriot Fourth Division.

The competition consisted of seven rounds. In the first and in the second round each tie was played as a single leg and was held at the home ground of one of the two teams, according to the draw results. Each tie winner was qualifying to the next round. If a match was drawn, extra time was following. If extra time was drawn, the winner was decided by penalty shoot-out.

The third and fourth round were played in a two-legged format, each team playing a home and an away match against their opponent. The team which scored more goals on aggregate, was qualifying to the next round. If the two teams scored the same number of goals on aggregate, then the team which scored more goals away from home was advancing to the next round.

If both teams had scored the same number of home and away goals, then extra time was following after the end of the second leg match. If during the extra thirty minutes both teams had managed to score, but they had scored the same number of goals, then the team who scored the away goals was advancing to the next round (i.e. the team which was playing away). If there weren't scored any goals during extra time, the qualifying team was determined by penalty shoot-out.

In the next round (quarter-finals), the teams were drawn into two groups of four. The teams of each group played against each other twice, once at their home and once away. The group winners and runners-up of each group advanced to the semi-finals.

The semi-finals were played over two legs and the same format as in the third and fourth round was applied. The final was a single match.

The cup winner secured a place in the 2008–09 UEFA Cup.

== First round ==
In the first round participated all the teams of the Cypriot Second Division and the Cypriot Third Division and 12 of the 14 teams of the Cypriot Fourth Division. The two fourth division teams which were promoted from the 2007 STOK promotion play-offs to the 2007–08 Cypriot Fourth Division after finishing to the second and third place (Ellinismos Akakiou and P.O. Xylotymvou 2006) did not participate in the Cypriot Cup. ASPIS Pylas which finished first in the 2007 STOK promotion play-offs, participated in the Cypriot Cup.

Team 1	Score	Team 2
Sourouklis Troullon (D)	2–1	MEAP Nisou (B)
Frenaros FC 2000 (C)	1–2	Adonis Idaliou (C)
PAEEK (C)	2–1 (a.e.t.)	SEK Agiou Athanasiou (D)
AEP Paphos FC (B)	4–0	Digenis Oroklinis (D)
AEK Kouklia F.C. (C)	1–1 (2–3 p)	Onisilos Sotira (B)
Ethnikos Assia F.C. (C)	3–1	Enosis Neon Parekklisia F.C. (D)
Anagennisi Trachoni (C)	0–1	ASIL Lysi (B)
Chalkanoras Idaliou (C)	1–2	Enosis Kokkinotrimithia (D)
Olympos Xylofagou (B)	3–1	ENAD Polis Chrysochous FC (C)
Spartakos Kitiou (C)	4–2	Akritas Chlorakas (B)
Ayia Napa F.C. (B)	3–1	FC Episkopi (D)
ENTHOI Lakatamia FC (B)	2–1	Omonia Aradippou (B)
Achyronas Liopetriou (D)	1–3	Orfeas Nicosia (D)
Atromitos Yeroskipou (B)	2–0	Elpida Xylofagou (C)
Anagennisi Germasogeias (C)	4–1	Iraklis Gerolakkou (C)
Ethnikos Latsion (D)	1–4	Anagennisi Deryneia (B)
Kissos FC Kissonergas (C)	1–2	APEP Pelendriou (D)
ASPIS Pylas (D)	0–7	APEP F.C. (B)
Digenis Akritas Morphou (B)	2–2 (3–2 p)	AEZ Zakakiou (C)
Ermis Aradippou (B)	2–1 (a.e.t.)	Othellos Athienou F.C. (D)

== Second round ==
In the second round participated the winners of the first round ties.

Team 1	Score	Team 2
Ethnikos Assia F.C. (C)	3–2	Sourouklis Troullon (D)
Onisilos Sotira (B)	5–1	APEP Pelendriou (D)
Ayia Napa F.C. (B)	3–2	APEP F.C. (B)
Digenis Akritas Morphou (B)	2–0	Spartakos Kitiou (C)
Anagennisi Germasogeias (C)	3–0	Orfeas Nicosia (D)
ASIL Lysi (B)	1–0	Anagennisi Deryneia (B)
Adonis Idaliou (C)	2–1	ENTHOI Lakatamia FC (B)
Olympos Xylofagou (B)	3–1	Enosis Kokkinotrimithia (D)
Ermis Aradippou (B)	1–0	PAEEK (C)
AEP Paphos FC (B)	1–0	Atromitos Yeroskipou (B)

== Third round ==
In the third round participated the winners of the second round ties and six teams of the Cypriot First Division (the teams which finished 9th, 10th, 11th in the 2006–07 Cypriot First Division and the three teams which promoted from the 2006–07 Cypriot Second Division). The first eight teams of the 2006-07 Cypriot First Division did not participate in this round.

Team 1	Agg.	Team 2	1st leg	2nd leg
APOP Kinyras FC (A)	3–1	Onisilos Sotira (B)	2–1	1–0
Doxa Katokopias F.C. (A)	2–3	Ayia Napa F.C. (B)	1–1	1–2
Adonis Idaliou (C)	1–9	Nea Salamis Famagusta FC (A)	0–2	1–7
AEP Paphos FC (B)	4–3	Alki Larnaca F.C. (A)	3–1	1–2
ASIL Lysi (B)	1–4	Digenis Akritas Morphou (B)	1–3	0–0
Ethnikos Assia F.C. (C)	2–3	Olympos Xylofagou (B)	0–0	2–3
Ermis Aradippou (B)	4–3	Anagennisi Germasogeias (C)	0–0	4–3
Olympiakos Nicosia (A)	5–4	AEL Limassol (A)	2–2	3–2

== Fourth round ==
In the fourth round participated the winners of the third round ties and the eight teams of the 2007-08 Cypriot First Division which did not participated in the third round, that were the teams which finished in the first eight places in the 2006-07 Cypriot First Division.

The first legs were played on 23–24 October and the second legs on 31 October and 1 November.

Team 1	Agg.	Team 2	1st leg	2nd leg
Omonia	5–2	Olympiakos Nicosia	1–0	4–2
Nea Salamis	3–3	Enosis Neon Paralimni	1–0	2–3
Ermis Aradippou	2–3	Aris Limassol	1–2	1–1
Apollon	5–1	Digenis Morphou	3–1	2–0
AEK Larnaca	1–3	Agia Napa	0–2	1–1
APOEL	9–0	Olympos Xylofagou	6–0	3–0
APOP Kinyras	0–2	Anorthosis	0–2	0–0
AE Paphos	1–2	Ethnikos Achna	1–1	0–1

== Group stage (quarter-finals) ==
In the group stage participated the eight winners of the fourth round ties. The teams of each group played against each other twice, once at their home and once away. The group winners and runners-up of each group advanced to the next round.

=== Group A ===
Final table
Pos	Team	Pld	W	D	L	GF	GA	GD	Pts	Qualification
1	Apollon (A)	6	3	3	0	13	6	+7	12	Advanced to Semi-Finals
2	Omonia (A)	6	2	3	1	9	6	+3	9 (Note: Omonia 2-0 Nea Salamina; Nea Salamina 2-1 Omonia)	Advanced to Semi-Finals
3	Nea Salamina (A)	6	3	0	3	8	8	0	9	
4	Ethnikos Achna (A)	6	0	2	4	4	14	−10	2	

Rules for classification: 1) Points; 2) Head-to-head points; 3) Head-to-head goal difference; 4) Head-to-head away goals scored; 5) Goal difference; 6) Goals scored.
Notes:

Results
Home \ Away	APL	OMN	NSL	ETH
Apollon		1–1	2–0	5–1
Omonia	2–2		2–0	1–1
Nea Salamina	1–2	2–1		2–0
Ethnikos Achna	1–1	0–2	1–3	

Legend: Blue = home team win; Yellow = draw; Red = away team win.

=== Group B ===
Final table
Pos	Team	Pld	W	D	L	GF	GA	GD	Pts	Qualification
1	Anorthosis (A)	6	4	2	0	10	4	+6	14	Advanced to Semi-Finals
2	APOEL (A)	6	3	2	1	9	4	+5	11	Advanced to Semi-Finals
3	Ayia Napa (B)	6	2	0	4	6	12	−6	6	
4	Aris Limassol (A)	6	1	0	5	9	14	−5	3	

Rules for classification: 1) Points; 2) Head-to-head points; 3) Head-to-head goal difference; 4) Head-to-head away goals scored; 5) Goal difference; 6) Goals scored.

Results
Home \ Away	ANR	APN	ANP	ARS
Anorthosis		1–1	3–0	2–1
APOEL	0–0		3–1	3–1
Ayia Napa	0–1	1–0		0–3
Aris Limassol	2–3	0–2	2–4	

Legend: Blue = home team win; Yellow = draw; Red = away team win.

== Semi-finals ==
In the semi-finals participated the four teams which qualified from the group stage. The first legs were played on 23 and 30 April. The second legs were played on 7 May.

Team 1	Agg.	Team 2	1st leg	2nd leg
Omonia	2–3	APOEL	2–1	0–2
Apollon	2–4	Anorthosis	1–0	1–4

== Final ==
17 May 2008
20:00 EEST

APOEL	2–0	Anorthosis
Morais 53'; Mirosavljević 76'	Report

GSP Stadium, Nicosia
Attendance: 20,280
Referee: (Greece) Dimitris Kalopoulos

APOEL
Anorthosis

APOEL:
GK	12	(North Macedonia) Jane Nikolovski
DF	5	(Romania) Daniel Florea
DF	24	(Greece) Christos Kontis
DF	8	(Algeria) Bark Seghiri (yellow card)
DF	14	(Netherlands) Joost Broerse
MF	26	(Portugal) Nuno Morais
MF	7	(Cyprus) Constantinos Charalambides	(substituted off) 87' (yellow card)
MF	20	(Cyprus) Constantinos Makrides (c)
MF	23	(Portugal) Hélio Pinto
FW	9	(Serbia) Nenad Mirosavljević	(substituted off) 90'
FW	31	(Brazil) Zé Carlos	(substituted off) 82'
Substitutes:
DF	32	(Albania) Altin Haxhi	(substituted on) 82'
DF	18	(Cyprus) Demetris Daskalakis	(substituted on) 87'
FW	9	(Greece) Nikos Machlas	(substituted on) 90'
Manager:
(Serbia) Ivan Jovanović

Anorthosis:
GK	1	(Albania) Arjan Beqaj
DF	2	(Greece) Theodoros Tripotseris
DF	3	(Cyprus) Lambros Lambrou
DF	24	(Cyprus) Andreas Constantinou
DF	4	(Greece) Nikos Katsavakis (c)
MF	21	(Cyprus) Giorgos Panagi	(substituted off) 59'
MF	6	(Slovenia) Anton Žlogar
MF	20	(France) Vincent Laban	(substituted off) 72' (yellow card)
MF	10	(Portugal) Paulo Costa
FW	11	(Greece) Nikos Frousos
FW	9	(Poland) Łukasz Sosin
Substitutes:
FW	22	(Bulgaria) Metodi Deyanov	(substituted on) 59'
MF	18	(Georgia (country)) Klimenti Tsitaishvili	(substituted on) 72' (yellow card)
Manager:
(Georgia (country)) Temur Ketsbaia

MATCH OFFICIALS

- Assistant referees:
  - Aristidis Christou
  - Stefanos Grigoriades

MATCH RULES

- 90 minutes.
- 30 minutes of extra-time if necessary.
- Penalty shoot-out if scores still level.
- Five named substitutes.
- Maximum of three substitutions.

Cypriot Cup 2007–08 winners

19th title

== See also ==
- Cypriot Cup
- 2007–08 Cypriot First Division

== Sources ==
- "2007/08 Cyprus Cup". Rec.Sport.Soccer Statistics Foundation. 14 January 2016.
- Papamoiseos, Stelios (2013). Από την ενοποίηση... στα αστέρια [From unification... to the stars] (in Greek). Nicosia: The writer. pp. 146–147.
