= Ivan Jovanović (football manager) =

Serbian footballer and manager

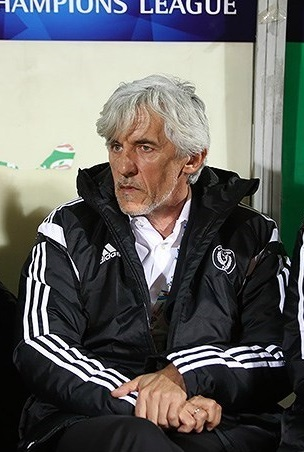
- Jovanović in 2016 managing Al Nasr

Personal information
- Date of birth: 8 July 1962 (age 64)
- Place of birth: Loznica, FPR Yugoslavia
- Position: Midfielder

Team information
- Current team: Greece (manager)

Youth career
- 1974–1980: Loznica

Senior career*
Years	Team	Apps	(Gls)
1980–1984	Loznica	158	(12)
1984–1989	Rad	120	(15)
1989–1999	Iraklis	275	(52)
Total		553	(79)

Managerial career
- 2001–2002: Niki Volos
- 2002–2003: Iraklis
- 2003–2005: APOEL
- 2005–2006: Panachaiki
- 2007–2008: Iraklis
- 2008–2013: APOEL
- 2013–2016: Al Nasr
- 2018–2019: Al Nasr
- 2019–2020: United Arab Emirates
- 2021–2023: Panathinaikos
- 2024–: Greece
- * Club domestic league appearances and goals

Ivan Jovanović (Serbian Cyrillic: Иван Јовановић; born 8 July 1962) is a Serbian professional football manager and former player who is the manager of the Greek National Team.

== Playing career ==
Jovanović played for Rad in the Yugoslav First League during the 1987–88 and 1988–89 seasons. The next season, he transferred to the Greek side Iraklis, where he played until the end of his career. During his spell in Iraklis, Jovanović evolved into one of the highest quality foreign players who ever played for the team.

== Managerial career ==
=== Early career ===
Ivan Jovanović began his managerial career in 2001 at Greek side Niki Volos. He then coached Iraklis and Panachaiki.

=== APOEL ===
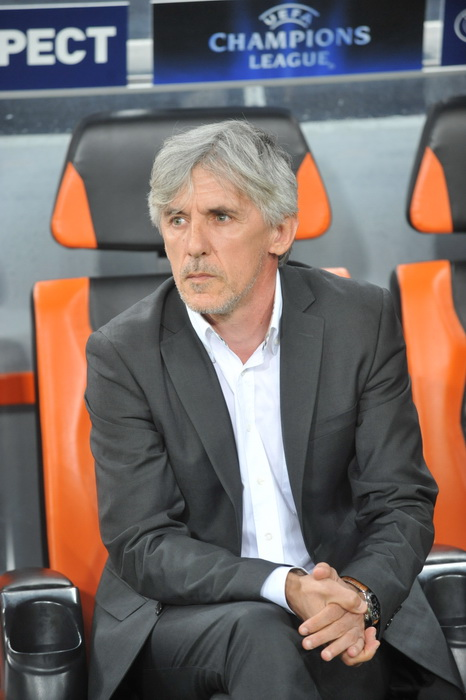
Jovanović as coach of APOEL in 2011

During his managerial career at APOEL he won nine trophies: four Championships, one Cup and four Super Cups. He also helped APOEL to qualify for the UEFA Champions League group stages for the first time in their history in 2009. Two years later, he repeated his achievement and just not only helped APOEL to qualify for the group stages of the 2011–12 UEFA Champions League, but achieved also to qualify for the quarter-finals by topping their group, beating Lyon in the last 16 on penalties, before being knocked-out by Real Madrid in the quarter-finals. He is considered as the most successful manager in the history of APOEL.

During his seven-year spell at APOEL he has been awarded the "Coach of the Season" award by Cyprus Football Association six times. He has also been awarded the "Serbian Coach of the Year" award by Football Association of Serbia in 2011.

On 30 April 2013, APOEL announced that Ivan Jovanović decided to leave at the end of the 2012–13 season, after five-and-a-half consecutive (and seven in total) successful years in the club.

=== Al Nasr ===
On 18 June 2013, Jovanović was announced as the new head coach of the Emirati club Al Nasr, having signed a two-year contract. On 19 May 2014, Jovanović led his team to a 2–1 victory over Saham in the 2014 GCC Champions League final and won his first trophy as Al Nasr's manager.

On 29 October 2016, Al Nasr sacked Jovanović from the technical command of the first football team, after failing to adjust the repeated technical errors.

On 19 January 2018, Al Nasr re-appointed Jovanović to replace Cesare Prandelli.

On 2 December 2018, Jovanović was sacked for a second time after a mixed start of the 2018–19 UAE Pro-League season.

=== United Arab Emirates ===
On 22 December 2019, Ivan was appointed as the new coach of the UAE national team. On 6 April 2020 the Emirati FA announced the termination of his contract.

=== Panathinaikos ===
On 17 June 2021 it was announced that Jovanović had been appointed as head coach of Panathinaikos under a one-year contract. He earned victory in his first Super League game for the Greens, beating Apollon Smyrnis 4–0. Under his management the team managed to reach its major goal, which was returning to European Competitions, after finishing 4th in the Super League. On 18 May 2022 he signed a two years extension with the club. Three days later, the team won the Greek Cup, the first title for the team in eight years against PAOK with a penalty kick. In the 2022–23 season, they were eliminated in the third qualifying round of the UEFA Europa Conference League by Slavia Prague, failing the club's aim to return to European groups after a six-year absence. In the Super League, Panathinaikos finished first in the regular season, but second in the play-offs, and eliminated in the Greek Cup, by PAOK in the quarter-finals.

In the 2023–24 season, Panathinaikos reached the UEFA Champions League play offs knocking out Dnipro and Marseille, only to be eliminated by Braga and continue in the group stage of the UEFA Europa League for the first time since the 2016–17 season. In the group stage, they finished in fourth place with four points and were left out of UEFA European Competitions, while in the Super League, after the 3–2 defeat by Atromitos, it was rumoured that Jovanović was to be dismissed by the board. After a 3–0 win against Volos in late December, he was relieved of his duties, with Panathinaikos sitting in second place. He was replaced by Fatih Terim.

=== Greece ===
Jovanović signed for Greece in 2024 with the intention of staying until the 2026 FIFA World Cup. In the 2024–25 UEFA Nations League, Greece upset England, defeating them 2–1 at Wembley, earning praise by the media.

== Managerial statistics ==
As of match played 16 November 2026

Team	From	To	Record				
Team	From	To	P	W	D	L	Win %
(Greece) Niki Volos	31 July 2001	15 May 2002	32	23	6	3	71.88
(Greece) Iraklis	28 May 2002	28 December 2002	18	8	4	6	44.44
(Cyprus) APOEL	25 November 2003	6 March 2005	53	36	10	7	67.92
(Greece) Panachaiki	1 November 2005	10 April 2006	23	5	7	11	21.74
(Greece) Iraklis	6 February 2007	17 December 2007	23	8	6	9	34.78
(Cyprus) APOEL	7 January 2008	30 June 2013	247	155	45	47	62.75
(United Arab Emirates) Al-Nasr	18 Jun 2013	29 October 2016	141	64	36	41	45.39
(United Arab Emirates) Al-Nasr	19 January 2018	15 December 2018	30	15	5	10	50.00
(Greece) Panathinaikos	1 July 2021	26 December 2023	112	63	22	27	56.25
Greece	1 August 2024	Present	26	13	5	8	50.00
Total			703	390	147	166	55.48

== Honours ==
Manager

Niki Volos

- Delta Ethniki: 2001–02

APOEL

- Cypriot First Division: 2003–04, 2008–09, 2010–11, 2012–13
- Cypriot Cup: 2007–08
- Cypriot Super Cup: 2004, 2008, 2009, 2011

Al-Nasr

- GCC Champions League: 2014
- UAE President's Cup: 2014–15
- UAE League Cup: 2014–15

Panathinaikos

- Greek Cup: 2021–22

Individual

- Manager of the Season (Cyprus): 2003–04, 2008–09, 2009–10, 2010–11, 2011–12, 2012–13
- Serbian Manager of the Year: 2011
- Super League Greece Manager of the Season: 2021–22
- Gazzetta Awards Manager of the Year in Greece: 2022
