= Gelson (footballer, born 1982) =

Brazilian footballer

Personal information
- Full name: Gelson Rodrigues de Souza
- Date of birth: 3 January 1982 (age 44)
- Place of birth: Juscimeira, Brazil
- Height: 1.75 m (5 ft 9 in)
- Position: Striker

Senior career*
Years	Team	Apps	(Gls)
2000–2001	Rondinella		
2001–2002	Pistoiese	1	(0)
2002–2003	Larcianese	25	(12)
2003–2004	Pistoiese	0	(0)
2004	AC Bellinzona	16	(12)
2005–2006	FC Thun	43	(16)
2006–2007	FC Chiasso	28	(11)
2007	FC Schaffhausen	8	(2)
2008	FC Locarno	14	(2)
2008–2010	APEP Pitsilia	51	(18)
2010–2011	Ethnikos Achna	28	(9)
2011–2012	Aris Limassol	25	(11)
- * Club domestic league appearances and goals as of 24 May 2011

Gelson Rodrigues de Souza known as Gelson (born 3 January 1982 in Juscimeira, Mato Grosso) is a Brazilian former football player who played as a striker.

He arrived in Europe at a young age, and played for Italian Serie D side Larcianese in summer 2002, and Pistoiese Primavera team, before leaving to play in the Italian speaking canton of Switzerland.

He made 4 appearances in the 2005–06 UEFA Champions League.
