= Sokol Maliqi =

Kosovan-Swiss footballer (born 1981)

Personal information
- Date of birth: 24 December 1981 (age 44)
- Place of birth: Pristina, SAP Kosovo, SFR Yugoslavia
- Height: 1.87 m (6 ft 2 in)
- Position: Forward

Team information
- Current team: FC Kosova (Head coach)

Senior career*
Years	Team	Apps	(Gls)
1999–2000	SC Cham	7	(0)
2000–2002	FC Wil 1900	8	(0)
2002–2004	FC Kreuzlingen	38	(15)
2004–2005	SC YF Juventus	16	(9)
2005–2006	FC Wil 1900	30	(18)
2006–2007	FC Luzern	15	(0)
2006–2008	FC Wil 1900	20	(4)
2007–2008	→ FC Vaduz (loan)	5	(0)
2008–2009	FC Biel-Bienne	16	(12)
2009–2010	APEP Pitsilia	22	(2)
2010–2011	FC Kosova	21	(14)
2011–2012	FC Kusnacht	21	(6)
2012–2013	FC Schwamendingen		
2013–2015	FC Dübendorf		
2016	FC Ruggell		
2016–2017	FC Gossau ZH		
2018–2020	FC Uzwil	7	(0)

International career
	Switzerland U17	4	(0)

Managerial career
- 2012–2013: FC Schwamendingen (player-coach)
- 2013–2015: FC Dübendorf (player-coach)
- 2016–2017: FC Gossau ZH (player-coach)
- 2018–2020: FC Uzwil
- 2020–: FC Kosova
- * Club domestic league appearances and goals

Sokol Maliqi (Serbo-Croat: Sokol Malići; born 24 December 1981) is a football coach and former player who coaches FC Kosova. Born in SFR Yugoslavia, he represented the Switzerland U17 national team at international level.

== Playing career ==
Maliqi was born in Pristina, Kosovo, at the time SFR Yugoslavia. He played as a forward.

== Coaching career ==
Maliqi started his coaching career in April 2012 as a player-coach at FC Schwamendingen. On 15 May 2013, it was confirmed, that he would join FC Dübendorf from the upcoming season, also as a player-coach. He left the position two years later and then had a brief spell with FC Ruggell.

In the summer 2016, he joined FC Gossau ZH, still as a player-coach. He left the position at the end of 2017, to become player-coach of FC Uzwil. On 20 April 2020, it was confirmed that Maliqi had been appointed head coach of his former club, FC Kosova.
