= Adrian Sikora =

Polish footballer

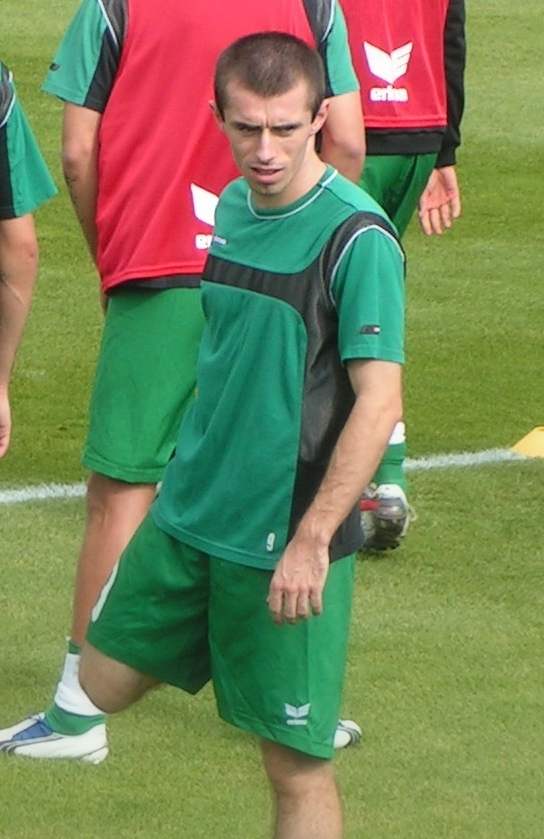
- Sikora with Dyskobolia

Personal information
- Full name: Adrian Sebastian Sikora
- Date of birth: 19 March 1980 (age 46)
- Place of birth: Ustroń, Poland
- Height: 1.70 m (5 ft 7 in)
- Position: Striker

Team information
- Current team: KS Nierodzim
- Number: 9

Youth career
- Czantoria Nierodzim

Senior career*
Years	Team	Apps	(Gls)
1998	Kuźnia Ustroń		
1999–2000	Beskid Skoczów		
2001–2002	BBTS Bielsko-Biała		
2002	Podbeskidzie Bielsko-Biała	15	(6)
2003	Górnik Zabrze	26	(10)
2004–2008	Dyskobolia	109	(46)
2008–2009	Real Murcia	25	(1)
2009–2011	APOEL	3	(2)
2011–2012	Podbeskidzie Bielsko-Biała	14	(0)
2012–2013	Piast Gliwice	9	(1)
2013	Nadwiślan Góra	10	(2)
2014–2020	Kuźnia Ustroń		
2021	KS Nierodzim	8	(16)
2022	Kuźnia Ustroń	13	(3)
2022–2023	Beskid 09 Skoczów	25	(16)
2023–2026	Kuźnia Ustroń	37	(5)
2026–	KS Nierodzim	19	(25)

International career
2003	Poland	2	(1)
- * Club domestic league appearances and goals as of 22:43, 22 June 2026 (UTC)

Adrian Sebastian Sikora (born 19 March 1980) is a Polish footballer who plays as a striker for KS Nierodzim.

== Club career ==
=== Dyskobolia ===
Sikora had played for Dyskobolia Grodzisk Wielkopolski, with which he won the Polish Cup in 2007.

=== Real Murcia ===
Sikora played for Murcia in the 2008–09 season.

=== APOEL ===
He signed a two-year contract with Cypriot Champions APOEL in July 2009. He scored his first two goals for APOEL on 26 September in a league game with Doxa Katokopia, but was injured and missed the rest of the season. Although fans were hopeful in seeing the Polish striker in action in the next season, new injuries meant he would miss the next half of the season. He didn't have a chance to play in APOEL, and so he moved to the reserves team for the second half of the 2010–11 season, until his contract ended.

=== Piast Gliwice ===
On 1 August 2012, he joined Piast Gliwice on a one-year contract.

== International career ==
Sikora has also played two times for the Poland national team, scoring one goal in a friendly match against Malta on 11 December 2003.

== Career statistics ==
=== International ===
Appearances and goals by national team and year
National team	Year	Apps	Goals
Poland
Poland	2003	2	1
Total		2	1

Scores and results list Poland's goal tally first, score column indicates score after each Sikora goal.

List of international goals scored by Adrian Sikora
No.	Date	Venue	Cap	Opponent	Score	Result	Competition
1	11 December 2003	Ta' Qali National Stadium, Ta' Qali, Malta	1	Malta	3–0	4–0	Friendly

== Honours ==
Dyskobolia Grodzisk Wielkopolski

- Polish Cup: 2006–07
- Ekstraklasa Cup: 2006–07, 2007–08

APOEL

- Cypriot Super Cup: 2009

Kuźnia Ustroń

- Regional league Bielsko-Biała: 2016–17
- Polish Cup (Skoczów regionals): 2020–21

KS Nierodzim

- Klasa B Skoczów: 2025–26

Individual

- Ekstraklasa Cup top scorer: 2006–07
