= Levan Maghradze =

Georgian footballer

Personal information
- Full name: Levan Maghradze
- Date of birth: 5 December 1977 (age 48)
- Place of birth: Tbilisi, Georgian SSR, Soviet Union
- Height: 1.79 m (5 ft 10 1/2 in)
- Position: Right back

Senior career*
Years	Team	Apps	(Gls)
1997–1998	Margveti Zestaponi	23	(3)
1998–1999	TSU Tbilisi	25	(1)
2000–2001	Aris Limassol	21	(5)
2001–2002	AEP Paphos	13	(4)
2002–2004	AEL Limassol	40	(7)
2004–2007	Skoda Xanthi	79	(1)
2007–2009	Apollon Limassol	40	(1)
2009–2011	Ermis Aradippou	56	(6)
2011–2013	Ethnikos Achna	55	(1)
2013–2014	Ermis Aradippou	24	(0)
2014–2015	Karmiotissa Polemidion	16	(0)
2015–2017	Enosis Neon Parekklisia	39	(0)

International career^{‡}
2005–2006	Georgia	4	(0)
- * Club domestic league appearances and goals as of 17 October 2015 ‡ National team caps and goals as of 13 July 2009

Levan Maghradze (Georgian: ლევან მაღრაძე; born 5 December 1977) is a retired football midfielder from Georgia. In the past he played for Apollon Limassol, FC Zestaponi, TSU Tbilisi, Aris Limassol, AEP Paphos, AEL Limassol, Skoda Xanthi, Apollon Limassol and Ethnikos Achna.

In 2009, he was signed by newly promoted Ermis Aradippou.
