= Juscimeira =

Coordinates: 16.0508°S 54.8839°W

- Municipality
- Country: Brazil
- Region: Center-West
- State: Mato Grosso
- Mesoregion: Sudeste Mato-Grossense

Population (2020)
  - Total: 11,176
- Time zone: UTC−4 (BRT)

Juscimeira is a municipality in the state of Mato Grosso in the Central-West Region of Brazil.

== See also ==
- List of municipalities in Mato Grosso
