= 2007–08 Cypriot First Division =

Marfin Laiki League
- Season: 2007–08
- Champions: Anorthosis; 13th title
- Relegated: Aris; Nea Salamina; Olympiakos
- Champions League: Anorthosis
- UEFA Cup: APOEL; Omonia
- Intertoto Cup: Ethnikos
- Matches: 218
- Goals: 591 (2.71 per match)
- Top goalscorer: David da Costa (16 goals); Łukasz Sosin (16 goals)

The 2007-08 Cypriot First Division started on 1 September 2007. The defending champions were APOEL.

This year, for the first time, the championship featured a group stage play-off system. Teams were divided into 3 groups; 1st-4th, 5th-8th and 9th-12th. The points were carried over from the first round.

Anorthosis won the championship three games before the end of the season, without losing a single match.

== Format ==
Fourteen teams participated in the 2007–08 Cypriot First Division. Each team played against every other team twice, once at home and once away, for a total of 26 matches. After these matches, the two teams with the worst records were relegated to the 2008–09 Cypriot Second Division. The remaining twelve teams were divided into three groups: 1st-4th, 5th-8th and 9th-12th.

The teams ranked first through fourth played out the champion and the participants for the European competitions. Teams ranked ninth through 12th determined the third relegated club, while the remaining four teams played a placement round. Every team played twice against its group opponents. Regular season records are carried over without any modifications.

The champions ensured their participation in the 2008–09 UEFA Champions League and the runners-up in the 2008–09 UEFA Cup.

The teams had to declare their interest to participate in the 2008 UEFA Intertoto Cup before the end of the championship. At the end of the championship, the higher placed team among the interested ones participated in the Intertoto Cup (if they had not secured their participation in any other UEFA competition).

=== Point system ===
Teams received three points for a win, one point for a draw and zero points for a loss.

== Teams ==
=== Promotion and relegation (pre-season) ===
Digenis Morphou, Ayia Napa and AEP Paphos were relegated at the end of the 2006–07 season after finishing in the bottom three places of the table.

The relegated teams were replaced by 2006–07 Second Division champions APOP Kinyras, runners-up Alki Larnaca and third-placed team Doxa Katokopias.

== Stadia and locations ==
2007–08 Cypriot First Division

Team	Stadium
AEK	GSZ Stadium
AEL	Tsirion Stadium
Alki	Ammochostos Stadium
APOP Kinyras	Pafiako Stadium
Anorthosis	Antonis Papadopoulos Stadium
APOEL	GSP Stadium
Apollon	Tsirion Stadium
Aris	Tsirion Stadium
Doxa	Makario Stadium
Ethnikos	Dasaki Stadium
Enosis	Paralimni Stadium
Nea Salamina	Ammochostos Stadium
Olympiakos	GSP Stadium
Omonia	GSP Stadium

== First round ==
=== League table ===
Pos	Team	Pld	W	D	L	GF	GA	GD	Pts	Qualification or relegation
1	Anorthosis Famagusta	26	19	7	0	49	13	+36	64	Qualification for second round, Group A
2	APOEL	26	16	5	5	51	19	+32	53	Qualification for second round, Group A
3	Omonia	26	14	6	6	36	22	+14	48	Qualification for second round, Group A
4	AEK Larnaca	26	12	5	9	34	32	+2	41	Qualification for second round, Group A
5	Apollon Limassol	26	10	9	7	40	33	+7	39	Qualification for second round, Group B
6	APOP Kinyras	26	10	7	9	35	35	0	37	Qualification for second round, Group B
7	Enosis Neon Paralimni	26	10	6	10	28	30	−2	36	Qualification for second round, Group B
8	Ethnikos Achna	26	11	1	14	34	35	−1	34	Qualification for second round, Group B
9	Doxa Katokopias	26	9	7	10	38	40	−2	34	Qualification for second round, Group C
10	Alki Larnaca	26	7	6	13	32	40	−8	27 (Note: Head-to-head: Alki 7 points; Aris 4 points; AEL 3 points)	Qualification for second round, Group C
11	Aris Limassol	26	7	6	13	24	35	−11	27	Qualification for second round, Group C
12	AEL Limassol	26	7	6	13	28	38	−10	27	Qualification for second round, Group C
13	Nea Salamina (R)	26	6	6	14	28	54	−26	24	Relegation to Cypriot Second Division
14	Olympiakos Nicosia (R)	26	3	5	18	23	54	−31	14	Relegation to Cypriot Second Division

Source: soccerway.com
(R) Relegated

=== Results ===
Home \ Away	AEK	AEL	ALK	ANO	APOE	APOL	APOP	ARI	DOX	ENP	ETH	NEA	OLY	OMO
AEK		2–2	2–0	1–1	0–3	0–2	1–1	1–0	1–2	1–3	1–0	2–2	2–1	1–0
AEL	0–2		2–0	1–2	1–1	0–0	0–2	0–0	2–1	1–4	1–2	1–0	3–1	1–1
Alki	0–2	2–0		0–0	0–4	1–0	3–1	1–1	1–1	0–1	1–3	4–1	5–0	2–1
Anorthosis	2–1	3–1	1–0		1–0	1–1	3–1	4–0	2–1	1–0	5–1	5–0	1–0	2–0
APOEL	1–0	2–0	3–0	0–1		2–0 (Note: Match abandoned. The score at the time was decided to be the official score.)	4–0	3–0	3–2	0–1	2–1	3–1	4–0	1–0
Apollon	2–0	4–3	1–0	2–2	0–2 (Note: Match abandoned. Score at the time was 2-2.)		2–0	2–1	2–2	3–0	2–1	4–1	3–2	3–3
APOP Kinyras	0–1	0–1	5–3	0–2	1–1	1–0		1–0	3–1	1–1	2–1	4–2	3–1	0–0
Aris	2–3	2–1	2–5	0–0	2–2	3–1	1–2		1–0	2–1	0–1	1–0	3–0	1–2
Doxa	3–3	2–1	1–0	1–1	2–2	1–0	2–2	2–1		2–2	2–1	2–3	2–0	1–0
Paralimni	0–1	1–1	2–1	1–2	1–0	2–2	0–2	1–0	0–1		0–2	1–0	0–1	1–3
Ethnikos	0–2	2–1	1–1	0–1	0–2	2–1	2–1	2–0	3–1	0–1		5–0	2–1	1–2
Nea Salamina	2–0	0–2	1–1	0–4	1–3	0–0	1–1	0–0	2–1	1–1	2–0		4–2	0–2
Olympiakos	0–2	1–2	1–1	0–1	2–2	2–2	1–1	0–1	2–1	2–2	1–0	2–4		0–1
Omonia	3–2	1–0	3–0	1–1	2–1	1–1	1–0	0–0	2–1	0–1	2–1	3–0	2–0	

Source: UEFA
Legend: Blue = home team win; Yellow = draw; Red = away team win.

== Second round ==
The first 12 teams were divided into 3 groups. Points were carried over from the first round.

=== Group A ===
==== Table ====
Pos	Team	Pld	W	D	L	GF	GA	GD	Pts	Qualification
1	Anorthosis Famagusta (C)	32	20	12	0	58	19	+39	72	Qualification for Champions League first qualifying round
2	APOEL	32	18	7	7	58	28	+30	61	Qualification for UEFA Cup first qualifying round
3	Omonia	32	14	10	8	42	31	+11	52	Qualification for UEFA Cup first qualifying round
4	AEK Larnaca	32	14	8	10	46	42	+4	50	

(C) Champions

==== Results ====
Home \ Away	ANO	APOE	OMO	AEK
Anorthosis		3–0	0–0	3–3
APOEL	1–1		2–2	2–1
Omonia	0–0	1–2		0–0
AEK	2–2	1–0	5–3	

Legend: Blue = home team win; Yellow = draw; Red = away team win.

=== Group B ===
==== Table ====
Pos	Team	Pld	W	D	L	GF	GA	GD	Pts	Qualification
5	Apollon Limassol	32	12	11	9	49	41	+8	47	Declined Intertoto participation (Note: Apollon declined their Intertoto participation)
6	Enosis Neon Paralimni	32	13	7	12	42	45	−3	46	
7	Ethnikos Achna	32	13	4	15	44	43	+1	43	Qualification for Intertoto Cup first round
8	APOP Kinyras	32	11	9	12	47	49	−2	42	

Source: UEFA.com standings and UEFA.com results

==== Results ====
Home \ Away	APOL	APOP	ENP	ETH
Apollon		2–2	4–1	0–2
APOP Kinyras	1–2		3–4	1–0
Paralimni	1–0	4–3		1–1
Ethnikos Achnas	1–1	2–2	4–3	

Source: UEFA.com standings and UEFA.com results
Legend: Blue = home team win; Yellow = draw; Red = away team win.

=== Group C ===
==== Table ====
Pos	Team	Pld	W	D	L	GF	GA	GD	Pts	Relegation
9	AEL Limassol	32	11	7	14	39	45	−6	40	
10	Alki Larnaca	32	11	7	14	41	44	−3	40	
11	Doxa Katokopias	32	10	9	13	43	48	−5	39	
12	Aris Limassol (R)	32	8	6	18	31	48	−17	30	Relegation to Cypriot Second Division

(R) Relegated

==== Results ====
Home \ Away	DOX	ALK	AEL	ARI
Doxa		0–0	1–2	2–0
Alki	1–0		2–1	4–1
AEL	2–2	1–0		3–2
Aris	3–0	1–2	0–2	

Source: UEFA.com standings and UEFA.com results
Legend: Blue = home team win; Yellow = draw; Red = away team win.

== Top scorers ==
Rank	Player	Club	Goals
1	(Brazil) David Da Costa	Doxa	16
1	(Poland) Łukasz Sosin	Anorthosis	16
3	(Cyprus) Constantinos Makrides	APOEL	13
4	(Portugal) Bernardo Vasconcelos	Omonia	12
4	(Uruguay) Ignacio Risso	Apollon	12
4	(Romania) Adrian Mihalcea	Aris	12

Last Update: 11 May 2008
Source: soccerboards.com

== Attendances ==
#	Club	Average
1	APOEL	7,239
2	Anorthosis	5,999
3	Omonoia	5,967
4	AEL	3,615
5	Apollon Limassol	3,568
6	AEK Larnaca	2,127
7	Olympiakos Nicosia	1,692
8	Nea Salamina	1,640
9	Alki	1,231
10	Aris Limassol	1,216
11	APOP	1,185
12	Doxa Katokopias	977
13	ENP	849
14	Ethnikos Achnas	625

== Sources ==
- "2007/08 Cypriot First Division". RSSSF. 14 January 2016.

== See also ==
- 2007–08 Cypriot Cup
- 2007–08 Cypriot Second Division
- 2007–08 in Cypriot football
