= Atromitos Yeroskipou =

- Full name: Αθλητικό Πολιτιστικό Σωματείο Ατρόμητος Γεροσκήπου; Athletic Cultural Club Atromitos Yeroskipou
- Founded: 1956; 70 years ago
- Dissolved: 2013
- Ground: Geroskipou Stadium, Yeroskipou, Cyprus
- Capacity: 2000
Home colours	Away colours

Atromitos Yeroskipou (Greek: Ατρόμητος Γεροσκήπου) was a Cypriot football team based in the town of Yeroskipou, Paphos.

== History ==
The club was founded in 1956 but the club was competing until 2004 in Paphos local league.

The club was promoted to Cypriot's Football Association lowest league (fourth division) for the first time in 2004. The club was promoted to the third division the following year and from season 2007–08 competes in second division. The team has been promoted to the first division by finishing third. The club in four years achieved to get promoted from Paphos local league to Cypriot first division. They were relegated to the Cypriot Second Division in the 2008–2009 season after just one year in the top flight. In 2013, the club was dissolved due to financial problems.

Their home ground was the Geroskipou Municipality Stadium.

== Colours and badge ==
The club colours were red and blue.
