= 2013–14 AC Omonia season =

AC Omonia
2013–14 season
- Chairman: Stelios Milonas (Until 21 January 2014); Doros Serafim (From 4 March 2014)
- Manager: Toni Savevski (Until 18 December 2013); Miguel Ángel Lotina (Until 6 February 2014); Kostas Kaiafas (From 12 March 2014)
- Stadium: GSP Stadium, Nicosia
- Cypriot First Division: 5th
- Cypriot Cup: Quarter-finals
- Europa League: Second qualifying round
- Top goalscorer: League: André Schembri (17); All: André Schembri (17)
- Highest home attendance: 18,271 vs Astra Giurgiu (25 July 2013 - Europa League)
- Lowest home attendance: 2,702 vs Doxa Katokopias
- Average home league attendance: 7,652
Home colours	Away colours	Third colours

The 2013–14 season is Omonia's 59th season in the Cypriot First Division and 65th year in existence as a football club.

== Season overview ==
=== Pre-season ===
On 20 June 2013, over 2,500 fans attended to the first official training session for the season at Ilias Poullos Training Center. The pre-season tour was held once again in Opalenica, Poland and the team played four friendlies against Lech Poznań, Wisła Kraków, Hapoel Tel Aviv and Widzew Łódź. When returning to Cyprus and one week before the start of Europa League, Omonia played a friendly against the Greek side Skoda Xanthi in GSP Stadium and won 3–1.

=== Cypriot First Division ===
On 31 August, the team is playing the first league game of the season against Anorthosis in Antonis Papadopoulos, Larnaca.

=== Cypriot Cup ===
The team is entering the 2013–14 Cypriot Cup in late fall 2013.

=== UEFA Europa League ===
Omonia entered the second qualifying round of the 2013–14 UEFA Europa League. The team were drawn against the Romanian side FC Astra Giurgiu and managed to get 1–1 away in Arena Națională after an equalizer from João Paulo Andrade in the second half. A week later, over 18,000 tickets were sold when the second leg was played in GSP Stadium but our team lost 1-2 and were therefore eliminated in the tournament.

== Current squad ==
Last Update: 19 July 2013

Note: Flags indicate national team as defined under FIFA eligibility rules; some limited exceptions apply. Players may hold more than one non-FIFA nationality.

No.	Pos.	Nation	Player
2	DF	NGR	Rasheed Alabi
4	DF	ESP	José
5	DF	BEL	Pieter Mbemba
7	MF	CYP	Georgios Efrem
8	FW	CYP	Onisiforos Roushias
9	FW	POL	Łukasz Gikiewicz
10	MF	POR	Bruno Aguiar
13	DF	ALG	Sofyane Cherfa
17	DF	FRA	Anthony Scaramozzino
18	DF	CYP	Christoforos Charalambous
19	DF	CYP	Andreas Panayiotou
20	FW	CPV	Platini
21	MF	POR	Nuno Assis

No.	Pos.	Nation	Player
23	DF	POR	João Paulo Andrade
28	MF	POR	Renato Margaça
30	MF	MLT	André Schembri
31	GK	POR	José Moreira
33	FW	CYP	Ioannis Chadjivasilis
40	DF	CYP	Charalambos Kyriakou
44	MF	HUN	Leandro
60	MF	CPV	Marco Soares
77	FW	USA	Tony Taylor
80	MF	CYP	Fanos Katelaris
83	GK	ENG	Corrin Brooks
96	MF	CYP	Panayiotis Therapontos
99	GK	CYP	Evagoras Hadjifrangiskou

For recent transfers, see List of Cypriot football transfers summer 2013.

=== Out on loan ===
Note: Flags indicate national team as defined under FIFA eligibility rules; some limited exceptions apply. Players may hold more than one non-FIFA nationality.

No.	Pos.	Nation	Player
—	DF	CYP	Demetris Moulazimis (to Enosis Neon Paralimniou until May 2014)

=== Active internationals ===
- (Malta) André Schembri
- (Portugal) José Moreira
- (Cape Verde) Marco Soares
- (Cape Verde) Platini

- (Cyprus) Georgios Efrem
- (Cyprus) Charalambos Kyriakou

- (Cyprus) Onisiforos Roushias (U-21)
- (Cyprus) Christoforos Charalambous (U-21)
- (Cyprus) Ioannis Chadjivasilis (U-21)
- (Cyprus) Evagoras Hadjifrangiskou (U-21)
- (Cyprus) Andreas Panayiotou (U-19)
- (Cyprus) Fanos Katelaris (U-17)

=== Foreign players ===
EU Nationals

- (Portugal) Bruno Aguiar
- (Portugal) Nuno Assis
- (Portugal) João Paulo Andrade
- (Portugal) Renato Margaça
- (Portugal) José Moreira
- (France) Anthony Scaramozzino
- (Malta) André Schembri
- (England) Corrin Brooks
- (Spain) José
- (Poland) Łukasz Gikiewicz

EU Nationals (Dual citizenship)

- (Hungary) (Brazil) Leandro
- (Cape Verde) (Portugal) Marco Soares
- (Republic of the Congo) (Belgium) Pieter Mbemba

Non-EU Nationals

- (Nigeria) Rasheed Alabi
- (United States) Tony Taylor
- (Cape Verde) Platini

=== Squad changes ===
In:

No.	Pos.	Nat.	Name	Age	EU	Moving from	Type	Transfer window	Ends	Transfer fee	Source
TBA	FW	(Cyprus)	Kyprou	21	EU	Chalkanoras Idaliou	Loan Return	Summer	2014	—	—
33	FW	(Cyprus)	Chadjivasilis	23	EU	Aris Limassol	Loan Return	Summer	2014	—	—
1	GK	(Switzerland)	Leoni	28	EU	Neftçi Baku (Azerbaijan)	Loan Return	Summer	2014	—	—
20	DF	(Algeria)	Cherfa	28	EU	Panthrakikos (Greece)	Loan Return	Summer	2014	—	—
83	GK	(England)	Brooks	25	EU	Alki Larnaca	Transfer	Summer	2014	Free	omonoia.com.cy
77	FW	(United States)	Taylor	23	Non-EU	Estoril Praia (Portugal)	Transfer	Summer	2014	Free	omonoia.com.cy
20	FW	(Cape Verde)	Platini	27	Non-EU	Santa Clara (Portugal)	Transfer	Summer	2014	Free	omonoia.com.cy
4	DF	(Spain)	José	30	EU	Girona (Spain)	Transfer	Summer	2014	Free	omonoia.com.cy
9	FW	(Poland)	Gikiewicz	25	EU	Śląsk Wrocław (Poland)	Transfer	Summer	2014	Free	omonoia.com.cy
5	DF	(Republic of the Congo)	Mbemba	25	EU	Bnei Sakhnin (Israel)	Transfer	Summer	2014	Free	omonoia.com.cy
99	GK	(Cyprus)	Hadjifrangiskou	26	EU	Nea Salamis Famagusta	Transfer	Summer	2014	Free	omonoia.com.cy
	DF	(Cyprus)	Demetris Moulazimis	21	EU	Enosis Neon Paralimni	Transfer	Summer	2014	Free	omonoia.com.cy

Total expenditure: ▼€0

Out:

No.	Pos.	Nat.	Name	Age	EU	Moving to	Type	Transfer window	Transfer fee	Source
9	FW	(Angola)	Freddy	33	Non-EU	Primeiro de Agosto (Angola)	End of contract	Summer	—	balla.com.cy
6	MF	(Portugal)	João Alves	32	EU	Académico de Viseu (Portugal)	End of contract	Summer	—	—
32	GK	(Greece)	Giannikoglou	20	EU	Alki Larnaca	End of contract	Summer	Free	balla.com.cy
24	DF	(Israel)	Spungin	26	EU	Mons (Belgium)	End of contract	Summer	Free	sentragoal.com.cy
77	FW	(Cyprus)	Christofi	24	EU	Sion (Switzerland)	Transfer	Summer	€1M	sport-fm.com.cy
25	FW	(Brazil)	Alves	29	Non-EU	Dubai CSC (United Arab Emirates)	Transfer	Summer	€200K	sentragoal.com.cy
14	DF	(Brazil)	Danielson	32	Non-EU	Gil Vicente (Portugal)	End of contract	Summer	Free	sigmalive.com
26	GK	(Israel)	Levita	27	Non-EU	Maccabi Netanya (Israel)	End of contract	Summer	Free	omonoia.com.cy
1	GK	(Switzerland)	Leoni	28	EU	Marítimo (Portugal)	End of contract	Summer	Free	omonoia.com.cy
	DF	(Cyprus)	Demetris Moulazimis	21	EU	Enosis Neon Paralimni	loan	Summer	—	omonoia.com.cy

Total income: ▲€1,2M

Last updated: 12 August 2013

== Squad stats ==
				Total						Cypriot First Division					Cypriot Cup					UEFA Europa League				
Country	N	P	Name	GS	A	Mins.	Gls.	Y	R	A	Mins.	Gls.	Y	R	A	Mins.	Gls.	Y	R	A	Mins.	Gls.	Y	R
(Nigeria)	2	CB	Alabi	2	2	180														2	180			
(Spain)	4	RB	José	2	2	165														2	165			
(Republic of the Congo)	5	CB	Mbemba																					
(Cyprus)	7	LW	Efrem		2	71														2	71			
(Cyprus)	8	CF	Roushias																					
(Poland)	9	CF	Gikiewicz	2	2	180	1	1												2	180	1	1	
(Portugal)	10	CM	Aguiar																					
(Cyprus)	13	CF	Demetriou																					
(France)	17	LB	Scaramozzino	2	2	180		1												2	180		1	
(Cyprus)	18	LB	Charalambous																					
(Cyprus)	19	CB	Panayiotou																					
(Cape Verde)	20	CF	Platini		2	15		1												2	15		1	
(Portugal)	21	AM	Assis	2	2	178		2												2	178		2	
(Portugal)	23	CB	João Paulo	2	2	180	1													2	180	1		
(Portugal)	28	LB	Margaça		1	2														1	2			
(Malta)	30	MF	Schembri	2	2	180														2	180			
(Portugal)	31	GK	Moreira	2	2	180														2	180			
(Cyprus)	33	CF	Chadjivasilis																					
(Cyprus)	40	CM	Kyriakou																					
(Hungary)	44	AM	Leandro	2	2	180														2	180			
(Cape Verde)	60	DM	Soares	2	2	180														2	180			
(United States)	77	RW	Taylor	2	2	109														2	109			
(England)	83	GK	Brooks																					
(Cyprus)	99	GK	Hadjifrangiskou																					

Last updated: 26 July 2013
Source: Match reports in competitive matches, omonoia.com.cy
Ordered by start team, game starts and position on pitch (from back right to front left)
0 shown as blank
Country: when 2 flags, 1st flag = country that plays for internationally, 2nd flag = country of birth; N = number on jersey; P = Position; Name = Name on jersey (for more extended name, pause the mouse pointer on the name); GS = Game Started; A = Appearances.

=== Top scorers ===
R	Player	Position	Nat.	League	Cup	Europe	Total
1	André Schembri	MF	(Malta)	6	0	0	6
2	Gikiewicz	FW	(Poland)	4	0	1	5
3	Nuno Assis	MF	(Portugal)	3	0	0	3
4	Tony Taylor	FW	(United States)	2	1	0	3
5	João Paulo	DF	(Portugal)	2	0	1	3
6	Platini	FW	(Cape Verde)	2	0	0	2
7	Leandro	MF	(Hungary)	1	0	0	1
8	Anthony Scaramozzino	DF	(France)	1	0	0	1
9	Georgios Efrem	MF	(Cyprus)	1	0	0	1
10	Onisiforos Roushias	FW	(Cyprus)	0	1	0	1
11	Bruno Aguiar	FW	(Portugal)	0	1	0	1
12	Rasheed Alabi	FW	(Nigeria)	1	0	0	1
TOTAL				23	3	2	28

Last updated: 26 July 2013
Source: Match reports in Competitive matches, omonoia.com.cy

=== Captains ===
1. (Hungary) Leandro
2. (Portugal) Bruno Aguiar

== Pre-season and friendlies ==
27-06-2013 Friendly	Lech Poznań	0 – 0	Omonia	Opalenica Stadium
12:00 EET		Report

30-06-2013 Friendly	Wisła Kraków	3 – 0	Omonia	Opalenica Stadium
18:00 EET	Małecki 11'; Sarki 18'; Celin 63'	Report

04-07-2013 Friendly	Omonia	1 – 3	Hapoel Tel Aviv	Opalenica Stadium
18:00 EET	Taylor 55'	Report	Safouri 3', 49'; Fantino 82'

06-07-2013 Friendly	Widzew Łódź	0 – 0	Omonia	Opalenica Stadium
18:00 EET		Report

10-07-2013 Friendly	Omonia	3 – 1	Skoda Xanthi	GSP Stadium, Nicosia
20:00 EET	Taylor 63'; Efrem 72' (pen.); Gikiewicz 73'	Report	Vasilakakis 11'	Attendance: 6,397; Referee: (Cyprus) Leontios Trattou

02-08-2013 Friendly	Doxa Katokopias	2 – 0	Omonia	Lakatamia Stadium, Lakatamia
18:00 EET	Lobo 36'; Lopez 73'	Report		Attendance: 2,500; Referee: (Cyprus) Marios Panagi

07-08-2013 Friendly	AEK Kouklia	0 – 2	Omonia	Kouklia Stadium, Kouklia
19:00 EET		Report	Schembri 36'; Aguiar 90+2' (pen.)	Attendance: 1,200; Referee: (Cyprus) Rovertos Kosta

10-08-2013 Friendly	Aris Limassol	0 – 3	Omonia	Pelendri Stadium, Pelendri
18:00 EET		Report	Leandro 12'; Taylor 18'; Assis 24'	Referee: (Cyprus) Leóntios Tráttos

14-08-2013 Friendly	Ayia Napa	2 – 4	Omonia	Tasos Markou Stadium, Paralimni
18:00 EET	Solomou 26'; 56'	Report	Assis 8'; Margaça 20'; Leandro 66'; Alípio 68'	Referee: (Cyprus) Dimitris Chrysostomou

21-08-2013 Friendly	Nea Salamina	2 – 5	Omonia	Ammochostos Stadium, Larnaca
19:00 EET	Roque 31'; Pantos 82'	Report	Soares 17'; Schembri 33', 40'; Taylor 79'; Gikiewicz 90'

07-09-2013 Friendly	AEK Athens	1 - 1	Omonia	OAKA, Athens
20:00 EET

== Competitions ==
=== Overall ===
Competition	Started round	Current position / round	Final position / round	First match	Last match
Cypriot First Division	—	—		31 August 2013	TBD
UEFA Europa League	2nd qualifying	—		18 July 2013	25 July 2013
Cypriot Cup	1st round	—		TBD	TBD

Updated to match played 6 July 2013
Source: Competitions

=== Cypriot First Division ===
==== Classification ====
Pos	Team	Pld	W	D	L	GF	GA	GD	Pts	Qualification or relegation
3	APOEL	26	18	5	3	56	18	+38	59 (Note: APOL 2–0 APOE; APOE 2–1 APOL)	Qualification for the championship group
4	Ermis Aradippou	26	15	7	4	44	28	+16	52	Qualification for the championship group
5	Omonia Nicosia	26	13	8	5	45	22	+23	47	Qualification for the championship group
6	Anorthosis Famagusta	26	11	5	10	46	36	+10	38	Qualification for the championship group
7	AEK Larnaca	26	10	7	9	37	28	+9	37	Qualification for the relegation group

Source: CFA, UEFA
Rules for classification: 1) points; 2) head-to-head points; 3) head-to-head goal difference; 4) head-to-head away goals scored; 5) goal difference; 6) number of goals scored

==== Results summary ====
Overall								Home						Away					
Pld	W	D	L	GF	GA	GD	Pts	W	D	L	GF	GA	GD	W	D	L	GF	GA	GD
32	14	10	8	52	30	+22	52	8	6	2	29	14	+15	6	4	6	23	16	+7

Last updated: 16 May 2014.
Source: UEFA

==== Results by round ====
Round	1	2	3	4	5	6	7	8	9	10	11	12	13	14	15	16	17	18	19	20	21	22	23	24	25	26	27	28	29	30	31	32
Ground	A	H	A	H	A	H	A	H	A	H	A	H	A	H	A	H	A	H	A	H	A	H	A	H	A	H	A	H	H	A	H	H
Result	L	W	L	D	W	W	W	W	W	D	W	D	L	W	W	L	L	W	D	D	W	W	D	W	D	D	D	W	D	L	L	L
Position	11	3	10	10	5	3	3	3	3	4	4	5	6	6	6	6	6	6	5	5	5	5	5	5	5	5	5	5	5	5	5	5

Updated to match(es) played on 16 May 2014. Source: omonoia.com.cy
A = Away; H = Home; W = Win; D = Draw; L = Loss

==== Matches ====
Kick-off times are in EET.

==== Regular season ====
31-08-2013 Matchweek 1	Anorthosis	3 – 1	Omonia	Antonis Papadopoulos, Larnaca
19:00	Demetriou 62'; Colautti 90+4', 90+8'	Report	Gikiewicz 85'	Attendance: 7,000; Referee: (Cyprus) Giannis Anastasiou

14-09-2013 Matchweek 2	Omonia	4 – 0	Enosis	GSP Stadium, Nicosia
19:00	André Schembri 35'; Leandro 48'; Gikiewicz 83'; Platini 85'	Report		Referee: (Cyprus) M. Nikolaou

21-09-2013 Matchweek 3	Apollon Limassol	1 – 0	Omonia	Tsirion Stadium, Limassol
18:00	Gastón Sangoy 1'	Report		Attendance: 8822; Referee: (Cyprus) C. Nikolaides

28-09-2013 Matchweek 4	Omonia	0 – 0	AEL Limassol	GSP Stadium, Nicosia
18:00		Report		Attendance: 0 Referee: M. Tsangaris

05-10-2013 Matchweek 5	Alki Larnaca	0 – 1	Omonia	GSZ Stadium, Larnaca
17:00		Report	João Paulo Andrade 45'	Attendance: 3000; Referee: L. Soteriou

19-10-2013 Matchweek 6	Omonia	1 – 0	AEK Larnaca	GSP Stadium, Nicosia
18:00	André Schembri 61'	Report		Attendance: 8850; Referee: K. Psevdiotis

26-10-2013 Matchweek 7	Doxa Katokopias	0 – 6	Omonia	Makario Stadium, Nicosia
18:00		Report	Georgios Efrem 2'; Nuno Assis 30'; André Schembri 36'; André Schembri 42'; Tony Taylor 86'; Tony Taylor 90'	Attendance: 1799; Referee: Y. Anastasiou

02-11-2013 Matchweek 8	Omonia	3 – 0	Nea Salamina	GSP Stadium, Nicosia
17:00	Nuno Assis 12'; André Schembri 15'; Gikiewicz 32'	Report		Attendance: 9763; Referee: C. Nikolaides

09-11-2013 Matchweek 9	AEK Kouklia	0 – 4	Omonia	Pafiako Stadium, Paphos
17:00		Report	Gikiewicz 7'; Nuno Assis 12'; João Paulo Andrade 38'; Anthony Scaramozzino 73'	Attendance: 923; Referee: M. Nikolaou

23-11-2013 Matchweek 10	Omonia	1 – 1	Aris Limassol	GSP Stadium, Nicosia
17:00	Platini 50'	Report	Thuram 21'	Attendance: 8282; Referee: A. Tsoukkas

01-12-2013 Matchweek 11	Ethnikos Achna	1 – 2	Omonia	Dasaki Stadium, Achna
17:00	Marco Aurélio 58'	Report	Rasheed Alabi 38'; André Schembri 46'	Attendance: 1700; Referee: M. Panayi

08-12-2013 Matchweek 12	Omonia	2 – 2	Ermis Aradippou	GSP Stadium, Nicosia
17:00	Alabi (yellow card) 32'; João Paulo Andrade (yellow card) 37' (goal) 54', 80'; Gikiewicz (yellow card) 39'; Leandro (yellow card) 55'	Summary	Paulinho 22' (yellow card) 68'; Bemba (yellow card) 27'; Henrique (yellow card) 32'; Papathanasiou 85'	Attendance: 9,531; Referee: (Cyprus) Yiannis Anastasiou

16-12-2013 Matchweek 13	APOEL	2 – 0	Omonia	GSP Stadium, Nicosia
19:00	Antoniades (yellow card) 37'; Gustavo Manduca 54'; Nuno Morais 75'	Summary	Scaramozzino (yellow card) 19'; João Paulo Andrade (yellow card) 69'	Attendance: 13,354; Referee: (Cyprus) Demetris Masias

21-12-2013 Matchweek 14	Omonia	3 – 2	Anorthosis	GSP Stadium, Nicosia
15:00	Platini (yellow card) 36'; Schembri 44', 80'; Marco Soares 55' (pen.) (yellow card) 90'; Kyriakou (yellow card) 60'; Gikiewicz (yellow card) 70'; Scaramozzino (red card) 85'; João Paulo Andrade (yellow card) 87'	Summary	Demetriou (yellow card) 9'; Alexa (red card) 19'; Colautti 26'; Pavićević (yellow card) 45'; Galamaz (yellow card) 54'; Avraam (yellow card) 63'; Makos (yellow card) 85'; Gonzalo García García 89'	Attendance: 8,138; Referee: (Cyprus) Antonis Christodoulou

05-01-2014 Matchweek 15	Enosis	0 – 3	Omonia	Tasos Markou Stadium, Paralimni
15:00	Angelos Tsiaklis (yellow card) 71'	Summary	Platini (yellow card) 39'; Alípio 50'; Alabi 74'; Roushias 90+1'	Attendance: 2,000; Referee: (Cyprus) Charalambos Skapoullis

12-01-2014 Matchweek 16	Omonia	2 – 4	Apollon Limassol	GSP Stadium, Nicosia
15:00	José (yellow card) 23'; Bruno Aguiar (yellow card) 40'; José Moreira (yellow card) 80'; Gikiewicz 90+1'; Taylor 90+4'	Summary	Sangoy 23' (pen.) 69'; Papoulis (yellow card) 25' (goal) 37'; Marios Stylianou (yellow card) 29'; Bruno Vale (yellow card) 67'; Marcos Gullón 90+3'	Attendance: 11,218; Referee: (Cyprus) Kostas Psevdiotis

19-01-2014 Matchweek 17	AEL Limassol	3 – 1	Omonia	Tsirion Stadium, Limassol
15:00	Jorge Filipe Monteiro 34' 88' (pen.); Kaluđerović 50'; Marco Airosa (yellow card) 60'; Carlitos (yellow card) 68'; Idabdelhay (yellow card) 88'	Summary	Gikiewicz 63' (yellow card) 68'; Serginho (yellow card) 84'	Attendance: 7,192; Referee: (Cyprus) Leontios Trattou

25-01-2014 Matchweek 18	Omonia	5 – 0	Alki Larnaca	GSP Stadium, Nicosia
18:00	Gikiewicz 16'; Platini 40'; Serginho 60' (pen.); Renato Margaça 71'; Schembri 76'	Summary	Andreas Christofides (yellow card) 47'; Constantinos Kastanas (red card) 58'	Attendance: 2,867; Referee: (Cyprus) Andreas Orthodoxou

02-02-2014 Matchweek 19	AEK Larnaca	0 – 0	Omonia	GSZ Stadium, Larnaca
15:00	Hélder Castro (yellow card) 33'; David Català (yellow card) 75'; Englezou (yellow card) 83'	Summary		Attendance: 3,000; Referee: (Cyprus) Yiannis Anastasiou

05-02-2014 Matchweek 20	Omonia	0 – 0	Doxa Katokopias	GSP Stadium, Nicosia
18:00	Scaramozzino (yellow card) 44'; João Paulo (yellow card) 68'	Summary	Toni (yellow card) 88'	Attendance: 2,702; Referee: (Cyprus) Charalambos Skapoullis

9-02-2014 Matchweek 21	Nea Salamina	0 – 1	Omonia	Ammochostos Stadium, Larnaca
15:00	Škvorc (yellow card) 76'	Summary	Cherfa 7'; João Paulo (yellow card) 76'	Attendance: 1,500; Referee: (Cyprus) Antonis Christodoulou

15-02-2014 Matchweek 22	Omonia	2 – 1	AEK Kouklia	GSP Stadium, Nicosia
18:00	Schembri 24'; Álex Rubio 71'	Summary	Savvas Pikramenos (yellow card) 30'; Wesllem 81'	Attendance: 2,755; Referee: (Cyprus) Loizos Panayiotou

23-02-2014 Matchweek 23	Aris Limassol	1 – 1	Omonia	Tsirion Stadium, Limassol
18:00	Thuram 6'; Eduardo Pincelli (yellow card) 35'; Kerkez (yellow card) 65'; Panos Theodorou (yellow card) 67'	Summary	Álex Rubio 63'; Ricardo Fernandes (yellow card) 75'	Referee: (Cyprus) Marios Nikolaou

09-03-2014 Matchweek 24	Omonia	1 – 0	Ethnikos Achna	GSP Stadium, Nicosia
16:00	Roushias 7'; José (yellow card) 31'	Summary	Tall (yellow card) 13'	Attendance: 4,203; Referee: (Cyprus) Thomas Mouskos

15-03-2014 Matchweek 25	Ermis Aradippou	1 – 1	Omonia	Ammochostos Stadium, Larnaca
18:00	Tagbajumi (yellow card) 45'; Alimi (yellow card) 59'; Manú 79'	Summary	Cherfa (yellow card) 28'; Scaramozzino (yellow card) 70'; Schembri 76'	Attendance: 2,000; Referee: (Cyprus) Yiannis Anastasiou

19-03-2014 Matchweek 26	Omonia	0 – 0	APOEL	GSP Stadium, Nicosia
18:00	Serginho (yellow card) 25'; Álex Rubio (yellow card) 87'	Summary	Vinicius (yellow card) 29'; Gustavo Manduca (yellow card) 38'; Nuno Morais (yellow card) 65'; João Guilherme (yellow card) 90'	Attendance: 10,441; Referee: (Cyprus) Demetris Masias

=== Play-offs ===
The first 12 teams are divided into 2 groups. Points are carried over from the regular season.

==== Championship group ====
Pos	Team	Pld	W	D	L	GF	GA	GD	Pts	Qualification
1	APOEL (C)	36	25	6	5	80	25	+55	81 (Note: APOEL: 7 pts; AEL: 4 pts)	Qualification for the Champions League third qualifying round
2	AEL Limassol	36	25	6	5	68	29	+39	81	Qualification for the Champions League third qualifying round
3	Apollon Limassol	36	24	5	7	66	29	+37	77	Qualification for the Europa League play-off round (Note: Since cup winners APOEL qualified for the 2014-15 UEFA Champions League and the runners-up Ermis finished top-four, all of the Europa League spots revert into league positions.)
4	Ermis Aradippou	36	18	8	10	55	54	+1	62	Qualification for the Europa League third qualifying round
5	Omonia Nicosia	36	16	11	9	59	37	+22	59	Qualification for the Europa League second qualifying round
6	Anorthosis Famagusta	36	12	6	18	57	64	−7	42	

Source: CFA, UEFA
Rules for classification: 1) points; 2) head-to-head points; 3) head-to-head goal difference; 4) head-to-head goals scored; 5) goal difference; 6) number of goals scored.
(C) Champions

==== Results ====
23 March 2014 Matchweek 1	Apollon Limassol	0 – 0	AC Omonia Nicosia	Tsirion Stadium
16:00	Sangoy (yellow card) 48'	Summary	Efrem (yellow card) 75'	Attendance: 7,500; Referee: (Cyprus) Marios Nikolaou

30 March 2014 Matchweek 2	AC Omonia Nicosia	3 – 1	Anorthosis Famagusta	GSP Stadium
18:00	Efrem 23' (pen.) 28'; José (yellow card) 72'; Schembri 90+1'	Summary	Colautti 4'; Paulo Jorge (red card) 21'; Avraam (yellow card) 22'; Becerra (yellow card) 45'	Attendance: 8,000; Referee: (Cyprus) Leontios Trattou

5 April 2014 Matchweek 3	AC Omonia Nicosia	0 – 0	APOEL	GSP Stadium
18:00	Serginho (yellow card) 19'; Leandro (yellow card) 81'; Kyriakou (yellow card) 85'	Summary	Benachour (yellow card) 34'; Antoniades (yellow card) 66'	Attendance: 12,800; Referee: (Cyprus) Christos Nikolaides

13 April 2014 Matchweek 4	AEL Limassol	2 – 0	AC Omonia Nicosia	Tsirion Stadium
17:00	Jorge Filipe Monteiro 6'; Idabdelhay 44'; Carlitos (yellow card); Potokar (yellow card)	Summary		Attendance: 4,208; Referee: (Cyprus) Marios Tsangaris

Matchweek 5	–

Matchweek 6	–

=== UEFA Europa League ===
==== Third qualifying round ====
18-07-2013 First Leg	Astra Giurgiu (Romania)	1 – 1	(Cyprus) Omonia	Arena Națională, Bucharest
21:30 EET	Tembo 8'	Report	João Paulo 66'	Attendance: 2,164; Referee: (Russia) Maksim Layushkin

25-07-2013 Second Leg	Omonia (Cyprus)	1 – 2	(Romania) Astra Giurgiu	GSP Stadium, Nicosia
20:00 EET	Gikiewicz 55'	Report	Scaramozzino 39' (o.g.); Budescu 69'	Attendance: 18,271; Referee: (Scotland) Steven McLean

=== Cypriot Cup ===
==== First round ====
23 October 2013 Round 1	Nikos & Sokratis Erimis	0 – 4	Omonia	Erimi Stadium, Limassol
14:00 EET		(Report)	Perikleous 9' (o.g.); Taylor 36'; Aguiar 52'; Roushias 83'	Referee: Nicolas Athanasiou

==== Second round ====
15 January 2014	Omonia	1–0	Aris Limassol	GSP Stadium, Nicosia
18:00 EET	Alípio 80' (pen.)	(Report)		Attendance: 3,380; Referee: Ioannis Anastasiou

29 January 2014	Aris Limassol	1–1 (1–2 agg.)	Omonia	Tsirion Stadium, Limassol
17:00 EET	Grassi 90+2'	(Report)	Platini 32'	Attendance: 1,112; Referee: Marios Panayi

==== Quarter-finals ====
12 February 2014	Omonia	2–1	Apollon Limassol	GSP Stadium, Nicosia
18:00 EET	Platini 11'; Gikiewicz 29'	(Report)	Haber 88'	Attendance: 6,673; Referee: Christos Nicolaides

19 February 2014	Apollon Limassol	1–0 (2–2a agg.)	Omonia	Tsirion Stadium, Limassol
16:00 EET	Robert 83'	(Report)		Attendance: 6,228; Referee: Marios Panayi
