= 2014–15 AC Omonia season =

AC Omonia
2014–15 season
- Chairman: Doros Serafim
- Manager: Kostas Kaiafas
- Stadium: GSP Stadium, Nicosia
- Cypriot First Division: –
- Cypriot Cup: First round
- Europa League: Play-off round
- Top goalscorer: League: Mickaël Poté (2); All: Mickaël Poté (4)
- Highest home attendance: 20,081 vs Dynamo Moscow (28 August 2014 – UEFA Europa League)
- Lowest home attendance: 11,661 vs Budućnost (24 July 2014 – UEFA Europa League)
- Average home league attendance: 15,597
Home colours	Away colours	Third colours

The 2014–15 season is Omonia's 60th season in the Cypriot First Division and 66th year in existence as a football club.

== Current squad ==
Note: Flags indicate national team as defined under FIFA eligibility rules; some limited exceptions apply. Players may hold more than one non-FIFA nationality.

No.	Pos.	Nation	Player
1	GK	CYP	Constantinos Panagi
3	DF	GEO	Ucha Lobjanidze
4	DF	CYP	Demetris Moulazimis
5	DF	SRB	Milan Stepanov
6	MF	ESP	Rodri
7	FW	CYP	Marios Demetriou
8	FW	CYP	Onisiforos Roushias
9	FW	ESP	Roberto
10	MF	GEO	Shota Grigalashvili
11	MF	BRA	Alípio
14	MF	CYP	Giorgos Ivanov
15	DF	CYP	Pantelis Konomis
16	MF	POR	Cristóvão Ramos
17	DF	FRA	Anthony Scaramozzino
18	DF	CYP	Christoforos Charalambous
19	MF	CYP	Andreas Panayiotou
20	MF	CYP	Gerasimos Fylaktou
21	MF	POR	Nuno Assis
22	FW	ESP	Álex Rubio

No.	Pos.	Nation	Player
23	MF	CYP	Giorgos Economides
24	DF	GEO	Levan Kakubava
25	GK	CYP	Nikolas Charalambous
26	MF	CIV	Gaossou Fofana
28	MF	POR	Renato Margaça
31	GK	POR	José Moreira
32	MF	CYP	Constantinos Louvaris
33	GK	CYP	Antonis Georgallides
36	MF	CYP	Jack Sammoutis
39	FW	BEN	Mickaël Poté
40	DF	CYP	Charalambos Kyriakou (Captain)
44	MF	HUN	Leandro
49	MF	CYP	Fanos Katelaris
88	MF	BRA	Serginho
89	DF	GER	Jonas Acquistapace
96	MF	CYP	Panayiotis Therapontos
97	MF	CYP	Andreas Sofokleous
98	MF	CYP	Sotiris Fiakas

Source: omonoia.com.cy

=== Out on loan ===
Note: Flags indicate national team as defined under FIFA eligibility rules; some limited exceptions apply. Players may hold more than one non-FIFA nationality.

No.	Pos.	Nation	Player

=== Active internationals ===
- (Georgia (country)) Ucha Lobjanidze
- (Georgia (country)) Levan Kakubava
- (Benin) Mickaël Poté

- (Cyprus) Onisiforos Roushias
- (Cyprus) Antonis Georgallides
- (Cyprus) Charalambos Kyriakou

- (Cyprus) Constantinos Panagi (U-21)
- (Cyprus) Demetris Moulazimis (U-21)
- (Cyprus) Marios Demetriou (U-21)
- (Cyprus) Christoforos Charalambous (U-19)
- (Cyprus) Pantelis Konomis (U-19)
- (Cyprus) Constantinos Louvaris (U-19)
- (Cyprus) Andreas Panayiotou (U-19)
- (Cyprus) Andreas Sofokelous (U-19)
- (Cyprus) Fanos Katelaris (U-17)

=== Foreign players ===
EU Nationals

- (Portugal) (Europe) Renato Margaça
- (Portugal) (Europe) José Moreira
- (Portugal) (Europe) Nuno Assis
- (Portugal) (Europe) Cristóvão Ramos
- (Spain) (Europe) Álex Rubio
- (Spain) (Europe) Rodri
- (Spain) (Europe) Roberto
- (Germany) (Europe) Jonas Acquistapace
- (France) (Europe) Anthony Scaramozzino

EU Nationals (Dual citizenship)

- (Hungary) (Brazil) (Europe) Leandro
- (Benin) (France) (Europe) Mickaël Poté

Non-EU Nationals

- (Georgia (country)) Ucha Lobjanidze
- (Georgia (country)) Shota Grigalashvili
- (Georgia (country)) Levan Kakubava
- (Brazil) Serginho
- (Brazil) Alípio
- (Serbia) Milan Stepanov
- (Ivory Coast) Gaossou Fofana

== Squad stats ==
=== Top scorers ===
R	Player	Position	Nat.	League	Cup	Europe	Total
1	Mickaël Poté	CF	(Benin)	2	0	2	4
2	Ucha Lobjanidze	RB	(Georgia (country))	0	0	2	2
3	Cristóvão Ramos	LW	(Portugal)	0	0	2	2
4	Onisiforos Roushias	CF	(Cyprus)	1	0	0	1
5	Nuno Assis	AM	(Portugal)	0	0	1	1
6	Gaossou Fofana	RW	(Ivory Coast)	0	0	1	1
7	Roberto	CF	(Spain)	0	0	1	1
TOTAL				3	0	9	12

Last updated: 1 September 2014
Source: Match reports in Competitive matches, omonoia.com.cy

== Pre-season and friendlies ==
Kick-off times are in EET.

19-06-2014 Friendly	Pelikan Łowicz	1-1	Omonia
18:00 EET	6'	Report	Serginho 52'

22-06-2014 Friendly	Huragan	0-2	Omonia	Stadion Miejski, Pobiedziska
18:00 EET		Report	Rubio 37'; Roushias 69'

25-06-2014 Friendly	Jagiellonia	3-0	Omonia	Dyskobolia Stadium, Grodzisk Wielkopolski
17:00 EET	Kądzior 67'; Piątkowski 76'; Wasiluk 85'	Report

27-06-2014 Friendly	Podbeskidzie	2-0	Omonia	Dyskobolia Stadium, Grodzisk Wielkopolski
17:00 EET		Report

29-06-2014 Friendly	Zawisza Bydgoszcz	2-0	Omonia	Dyskobolia Stadium, Grodzisk Wielkopolski
17:00 EET		Report

04-07-2014 Friendly	Doxa	0-2	Omonia	Makario Stadium, Nicosia
18:00 EET		Report	Roberto 19'; Alípio 85'

10-07-2014 Friendly	Omonia	2-0	Ermis	GSP Stadium, Nicosia
19:00 EET	Serginho 54'; Grigalashvili 57'	Report

10-08-2014 Friendly	Doxa	0-1	Omonia	Lakatamia Stadium, Lakatamia
18:30 EET		Report	Assis 43'

14-08-2014 Friendly	Nea Salamina	0-1	Omonia	Ammochostos Stadium, Larnaca
19:00 EET		Report	Sammoutis 77'

== Competitions ==
=== Overall ===
Competition	Started round	Current position / round	Final position / round	First match	Last match
Cypriot First Division	—	—		1 September 2014	TBD
UEFA Europa League	Second qualifying round	—	Play-off round	17 July 2014	28 August 2014
Cypriot Cup	1st round	—		TBD	TBD

Updated to match played 1 September 2014
Source: Competitions

=== Cypriot First Division ===
==== Classification ====
Pos	Team	Pld	W	D	L	GF	GA	GD	Pts	Qualification
1	Apollon Limassol	22	15	3	4	49	26	+23	48	Qualification to championship group
2	APOEL	22	13	7	2	34	13	+21	46	Qualification to championship group
3	Omonia Nicosia	22	12	3	7	32	22	+10	39 (Note: OMO 0–1 AEK; AEK 1–3 OMO)	Qualification to championship group
4	AEK Larnaca	22	11	6	5	41	23	+18	39	Qualification to championship group
5	Anorthosis Famagusta	22	12	2	8	32	22	+10	38	Qualification to championship group

Source: UEFA, CFA
Rules for classification: 1) points; 2) head-to-head points; 3) head-to-head goal difference; 4) head-to-head away goals scored; 5) goal difference; 6) number of goals scored

==== Results summary ====
Overall								Home						Away					
Pld	W	D	L	GF	GA	GD	Pts	W	D	L	GF	GA	GD	W	D	L	GF	GA	GD
1	1	0	0	3	2	+1	3	1	0	0	3	2	+1	0	0	0	0	0	0

Last updated: 1 September 2014.
Source: UEFA

==== Results by round ====
Round	1	2	3	4	5	6	7	8	9	10	11	12	13	14	15	16	17	18	19	20	21	22	23	24	25	26	27	28	29	30	31	32
Ground	A	H	A	H	A	H	A	H	A	H	A	H	A	H	A	H	A	H	A	H	A	H										
Result	P	W																														
Position	–																															

Updated to match(es) played on 1 September 2014. Source: omonoia.com.cy
A = Away; H = Home; W = Win; D = Draw; L = Loss; P = Postponed

==== Matches ====
Kick-off times are in EET.

=== Play-offs table ===
==== Championship group ====
Pos	Team	Pld	W	D	L	GF	GA	GD	Pts	Qualification
1	APOEL (C)	32	17	11	4	52	26	+26	62	Qualification to Champions League second qualifying round
2	AEK Larnaca	32	17	8	7	56	31	+25	59 (Note: AEK: 9 pts; APOL: 3 pts)	Qualification to Europa League third qualifying round (Note: Since Cypriot cup winners APOEL qualified for the 2015–16 UEFA Champions League, the fourth placed team would also qualify for the first qualifying round of the 2015–16 UEFA Europa League.)
3	Apollon Limassol	32	18	5	9	59	41	+18	59	Qualification to Europa League first qualifying round
4	Omonia Nicosia	32	17	5	10	52	34	+18	56	Qualification to Europa League first qualifying round
5	Anorthosis Famagusta	32	16	4	12	50	37	+13	52	
6	Ermis Aradippou	32	11	7	14	38	55	−17	40	

Source: CFA, UEFA
Rules for classification: 1) points; 2) head-to-head points; 3) head-to-head goal difference; 4) head-to-head goals scored; 5) goal difference; 6) number of goals scored.
(C) Champions

=== UEFA Europa League ===
==== Second qualifying round ====
17-07-2014 First Leg	Budućnost (Montenegro)	0-2	(Cyprus) Omonia	Stadion kraj Bistrice, Nikšić
18:30 EET		Report	Roberto 36'; Lobjanidze 79'	Attendance: 1,000; Referee: (Belgium) Maksim Layushkin

24-07-2014 Second Leg	Omonia (Cyprus)	0-0 (2–0 agg.)	(Montenegro) Budućnost	GSP Stadium, Nicosia
19:00 EET		Report		Attendance: 11,661; Referee: (Austria) Oliver Drachta

==== Third qualifying round ====
31-07-2014 First Leg	Omonia (Cyprus)	3-0	(North Macedonia) Metalurg Skopje	GSP Stadium, Nicosia
19:00 EET	Cristóvão 9'; Poté 14'; Cristóvão 57'	Report		Attendance: 15,050; Referee: (Lithuania) Gediminas Mažeika

07-08-2014 Second Leg	Metalurg Skopje (North Macedonia)	0-1 (0-4 agg.)	(Cyprus) Omonia	Philip II Arena, Skopje
21:45 EET		Report	Assis 54'	Attendance: 664; Referee: (Republic of Ireland) Padraigh Sutton

==== Play-off round ====
21-08-2014 First Leg	Dynamo Moscow (Russia)	2-2	(Cyprus) Omonia	Arena Khimki, Khimki
18:30 EET	Samba 33'; Büttner 72'	Report	Lobjanidze 2'; Fofana 59'	Attendance: 6,381; Referee: (Switzerland) Stephan Studer

28-08-2014 Second Leg	Omonia (Cyprus)	1-2 (3-4 agg.)	(Russia) Dynamo Moscow	GSP Stadium, Nicosia
19:00 EET	Poté 23'	Report	Stepanov 11' (o.g.); Samba 90+3'	Attendance: 20,081; Referee: (Romania) Alexandru Tudor

=== Cypriot Cup ===
==== First round ====
First Leg	–
--:-- EET

Second Leg	– (– agg.)
--:-- EET
