= 2015–16 AC Omonia season =

AC Omonia
2015–16 season
- Chairman: Doros Serafim
- Manager: Vladan Milojević
- Stadium: GSP Stadium, Nicosia
- Cypriot First Division: 4th
- Cypriot Cup: Final
- Europa League: Third Qualifying round
- Top goalscorer: Cillian Sheridan (14)
Home colours	Away colours	Third colours

The 2015–16 season is Omonia's 61st season in the Cypriot First Division and 67th year in existence as a football club.

== Current squad ==
Note: Flags indicate national team as defined under FIFA eligibility rules; some limited exceptions apply. Players may hold more than one non-FIFA nationality.

No.	Pos.	Nation	Player
1	GK	CYP	Constantinos Panagi
4	DF	CPV	Carlitos
5	DF	CIV	Romaric
7	MF	CYP	Marios Demetriou
8	FW	CYP	Onisiforos Roushias
9	FW	IRL	Cillian Sheridan
10	MF	BRA	Luciano Bebê
13	FW	NGR	Eze Vincent
16	MF	POR	Cristóvão Ramos
19	DF	CYP	Andreas Panayiotou
20	MF	CYP	Gerasimos Fylaktou
21	MF	POR	Nuno Assis (Captain)
23	MF	CYP	Giorgos Economides
24	DF	GRE	Anastasios Kantoutsis

No.	Pos.	Nation	Player
27	FW	MLT	Andre Schembri
28	MF	CYP	Renato Margaça (vice-captain)
30	MF	SLO	Andraž Kirm
31	GK	ROU	Laurențiu Brănescu (on loan from Juventus)
33	GK	CYP	Antonis Georgallides
39	MF	BEL	Ziguy Badibanga
40	MF	ROU	George Florescu
45	DF	EGY	Karim Hafez (on loan from Lierse)
48	DF	CRO	Marin Oršulić
49	MF	CYP	Fanos Katelaris
77	FW	CYP	Demetris Christofi
88	MF	BEL	Faysel Kasmi (on loan from Lierse)
90	DF	CRO	Ivan Runje

=== On loan ===
Note: Flags indicate national team as defined under FIFA eligibility rules; some limited exceptions apply. Players may hold more than one non-FIFA nationality.

No.	Pos.	Nation	Player
—	DF	CYP	Demetris Moulazimis (at Ermis Aradippou until 31 May 2016)
—	DF	CYP	Pantelis Konomis (at Omonia Aradippou until 31 May 2016)
—	MF	CYP	Constantinos Louvaris (at Olympiakos Nicosia until 31 May 2016)
—	MF	CYP	Andreas Frangeskou (at PAEEK FC until 31 May 2016)

No.	Pos.	Nation	Player
—	MF	CYP	Andreas Loizou (at Chalkanoras Idaliou until 31 May 2016)
—	MF	CYP	Giorgos Ivanov (at MEAP Nisou until 31 May 2016)
—	FW	CYP	Panayiotis Therapontos (at PAEEK FC until 31 May 2016)
—	FW	CYP	Apollonas Vasiliou (at MEAP Nisou until 31 May 2016)

Source: omonoia.com.cy

=== Active internationals ===
- (Malta) Andre Schembri
- (Slovenia) Andraž Kirm

- (Cyprus) Onisiforos Roushias
- (Cyprus) Antonis Georgallides
- (Cyprus) Constantinos Panagi

- (Cyprus) Demetris Moulazimis (U-21)
- (Cyprus) Marios Demetriou (U-21)
- (Cyprus) Christoforos Charalambous (U-19)
- (Cyprus) Pantelis Konomis (U-19)
- (Cyprus) Constantinos Louvaris (U-19)
- (Cyprus) Andreas Panayiotou (U-19)
- (Cyprus) Andreas Sofokelous (U-19)
- (Cyprus) Fanos Katelaris (U-17)

=== Foreign players ===
EU Nationals

- (Portugal) (Europe) Nuno Assis
- (Portugal) (Europe) Cristóvão Ramos
- (Republic of Ireland) (Europe) Cillian Sheridan
- (Greece) (Europe) Anastasios Kantoutsis
- (Malta) (Europe) Andre Schembri
- (Slovenia) (Europe) Andraž Kirm
- (Romania) (Europe) Laurențiu Brănescu
- (Belgium) (Europe) Ziguy Badibanga
- (Romania) (Europe) George Florescu
- (Croatia) (Europe) Marin Oršulić
- (Belgium) (Europe) Faysel Kasmi
- (Croatia) (Europe) Ivan Runje

EU Nationals (Dual citizenship)

- (Cyprus) (Portugal) (Europe) Renato Margaça
- (Cape Verde) (Portugal) (Europe) Carlitos

Non-EU Nationals

- (Ivory Coast) Romaric
- (Egypt) Karim Hafez
- (Brazil) Luciano Bebê
- (Nigeria) Eze Vincent

== Squad stats ==
=== Top scorers ===
R	Player	Position	Nat.	League	Cup	Europe	Total
1	Cillian Sheridan	FW	(Republic of Ireland)	15	1	3	19
2	André Schembri	FW	(Malta)	15	1	1	17
3	Nuno Assis	MF	(Portugal)	9	1	0	10
4	Ziguy Badibanga	FW	(Belgium)	6	2	0	8
5	Andraž Kirm	MF	(Slovenia)	5	2	0	7
6	Onisiforos Roushias	FW	(Cyprus)	2	1	0	3
7	Luciano Bebê	MF	(Brazil)	2	0	0	2
TOTAL				54	8	4	66

Last updated: 27 April 2016
Source: Match reports in Competitive matches, omonoia.com.cy

Captains

1. (Portugal) Nuno Assis
2. (Cyprus) Renato João Inácio Margaça
3. (Malta) André Schembri

== Pre-season and friendlies ==
15-06-2015 Friendly	Lovech	3−2	Omonia
17:00		Report

13-08-2015 Friendly	Ermis	2-2	Omonia	Ammochostos Stadium, Larnaca
17:00		Report

16-08-2015 Friendly	Doxa	0-0	Omonia	Makario Stadium, Nicosia
17:00		Report

== Competitions ==
=== Overall ===
Competition	Started round	Current position / round	Final position / round	First match	Last match
Cypriot First Division	—	—		1 September 2014	TBD
UEFA Europa League	Second qualifying round	—	Play-off round	17 July 2014	28 August 2014
Cypriot Cup	1st round	—		TBD	TBD

Updated to match played 1 September 2014
Source: Competitions

=== Cypriot First Division ===
==== Classification ====
Pos	Team	Pld	W	D	L	GF	GA	GD	Pts	Qualification or relegation
2	AEK Larnaca	26	19	4	3	47	17	+30	61	Qualification for the championship round
3	Anorthosis Famagusta	26	15	7	4	48	22	+26	52	Qualification for the championship round
4	Omonia	26	14	7	5	46	24	+22	49 (Note: Head-to-head record: Omonia 0–0 Apollon, Apollon 0–0 Omonia.)	Qualification for the championship round
5	Apollon Limassol	26	14	7	5	41	24	+17	49	Qualification for the championship round
6	Nea Salamis Famagusta	26	8	9	9	37	52	−15	33	Qualification for the championship round

Source: UEFA, CFA, Soccerway
Rules for classification: 1) Points; 2) Head-to-head points; 3) Head-to-head goal difference; 4) Head-to-head goals scored; 5) Head-to-head away goals scored (only if two teams); 6) Goal difference; 7) Goals scored; 8) Play-off (only if deciding championship round, relegation round or relegation).

==== Results summary ====
Overall								Home						Away					
Pld	W	D	L	GF	GA	GD	Pts	W	D	L	GF	GA	GD	W	D	L	GF	GA	GD
26	14	7	5	46	24	+22	49	8	5	0	32	13	+19	6	2	5	14	11	+3

Last updated: 26 April 2016.
Source: UEFA

==== Results by round ====
Round	1	2	3	4	5	6	7	8	9	10	11	12	13	14	15	16	17	18	19	20	21	22	23	24	25	26
Ground	H	A	H	H	A	H	A	H	A	H	A	H	A	A	H	A	A	H	A	H	A	H	A	H	A	H
Result	W	L	D	D	W	D	W	W	L	D	W	D	L	W	W	W	D	W	D	W	L	W	L	W	W	W
Position	2	7	5	9	6	6	5	5	5	5	5	6	6	5	5	5	5	5	5	4	5	5	5	5	5	4

Updated to match(es) played on 26 April 2016. Source: omonoia.com.cy
A = Away; H = Home; W = Win; D = Draw; L = Loss

==== Matches ====
22-08-2015 Matchweek 1	Omonia	5–3	Nea Salamina	GSP Stadium, Nicosia
17:00	Sheridan 20', 90+4' (pen.); Assis 49', 68'; Schembri 90'	Report	Pavlou 6'; Ćurjurić 41'; Adorno 45+1'	Attendance: 8,124; Referee: (Cyprus) Kostas Nikolaou

29-08-2015 Matchweek 2	Ethnikos	1–0	Omonia	Dasaki Stadium, Dasaki Achnas
17:00	Chadjivasilis 37'	Report		Attendance: 2,000; Referee: (Cyprus) Christos Elia

12-09-2015 Matchweek 3	Omonia	1–1	Doxa	GSP Stadium, Nicosia
17:00	Schembri 36'	Report	Leandro 90+5'	Attendance: 8,000; Referee: (Cyprus) Thomas Mouskos

19-09-2015 Matchweek 4	Omonia	0–0	Anorthosis	Antonis Papadopoulos, Larnaca
17:00		Report		Attendance: 11,000; Referee: (Cyprus) Christos Nikolaides

27-09-2015 Matchweek 5	Ayia Napa	1–2	Omonia	Tasos Markos Stadium, Paralimni
16:00	Maatsen 62'	Report	Badibanga 21', 28'	Attendance: 1,500; Referee: (Cyprus) Giorgos Nikolaou

03-10-2015 Matchweek 6	Omonia	0–0	Apollon	GSP Stadium, Nicosia
16:00		Report		Attendance: 10,010; Referee: (Cyprus) Vasilis Demetriou

18-10-2015 Matchweek 7	Ermis	0–1	Omonia	Ammochostos Stadium, Larnaca
17:00		Report	Roushia 53'	Attendance: 2,000; Referee: (Cyprus) Giorgos Nikolaou

24-10-2015 Matchweek 8	Omonia	6–0	Pafos	GSP Stadium, Nicosia
16:00	Assis 13' (pen.); Economides 32'; Kirm 54'; Schembri 76', 90+1'; Eze 84'	Report	Kvaskhvadze (red card) 9'	Attendance: 6,103; Referee: (Cyprus) Charalambos Skapoullis

01-11-2015 Matchweek 9	AEK Larnaca	2–1	Omonia	GSZ Stadium, Larnaca
16:00	Alves 42', 62'	Report	Schembri 37'	Attendance: 5,000; Referee: (Cyprus) Vasilis Demetriou

09-11-2015 Matchweek 10	Omonia	2–2	APOEL	GSP Stadium, Nicosia
17:00	Margaça 2'; Sheridan 78' (pen.)	Report	Cavenaghi 15', 52'	Attendance: 10,297; Referee: (Cyprus) Demetris Masias

22-11-2015 Matchweek 11	Aris Limassol	0–1	Omonia	Tsirion Stadium, Limassol
16:00		Report	Sheridan 44' (pen.)	Attendance: 2,132; Referee: (Cyprus) Nikolas Athanasiou

29-11-2015 Matchweek 12	Omonia	2–2	Enosis Neon Paralimni	GSP Stadium, Nicosia
14:00	Schembri 22'; Roushias 83'	Report	Bojović 16'; Dickson 34'	Attendance: 6,218; Referee: (Cyprus) Kostas Nikolaou

06-12-2015 Matchweek 13	AEL Limassol	2–1	Omonia	Tsirion Stadium, Limassol
16:00	Sardinero 60'; Sema 75' (pen.)	Report	Sheridan 87'	Attendance: 3,348; Referee: (Cyprus) Avraam Tsoukkas

13-12-2015 Matchweek 14	Nea Salamina	0–2	Omonia	Ammochostos Stadium, Larnaca
16:00		Report	Kirm 12'; Assis 90+4'	Attendance: 2,000; Referee: (Cyprus) Leontios Trattou

19-12-2015 Matchweek 15	Omonia	2–1	Ethnikos	GSP Stadium, Nicosia
15:00	Sheridan 8' (pen.); Schembri 33'	Report	Grigalashvili 48'	Attendance: 3,177; Referee: (Cyprus) Loukas Soterioi

22-12-2015 Matchweek 16	Doxa	0–1	Omonia	Makario Stadium, Nicosia
17:00		Report	Assis 10'	Attendance: 2,000; Referee: (Cyprus) Kostas Nikolaou

02-01-2016 Matchweek 17	Anorthosis	0–0	Omonia	Antonis Papadopoulos Stadium, Larnaca
17:00		Report		Attendance: 8,000; Referee: (Cyprus) Avraam Tsoukkas

09-01-2016 Matchweek 18	Omonia	4–0	Ayia Napa	GSP Stadium, Nicosia
15:00	Sheridan 3'; Assis 21'; Schembri 89', 90+2'	Report		Attendance: 5,086; Referee: (Cyprus) Demetris Masias

16-01-2016 Matchweek 19	Apollon	0–0	Omonia	Tsirion Stadium, Limassol
15:00		Report		Attendance: 4,664; Referee: (Cyprus) Leontios Trattou

23-01-2016 Matchweek 20	Omonia	1–0	Ermis	GSP Stadium, Nicosia
15:00	Sheridan 90+2' (pen.)	Report		Attendance: 4,590; Referee: (Cyprus) Charalambos Skapoullis

31-01-2016 Matchweek 21	Pafos	2–1	Omonia	Pafiako Stadium, Pafos
14:00	Ibson 28'; Maachi 89'	Report	Sheridan 25'	Attendance: 1,853; Referee: (Cyprus) Christos Nikolaides

06-02-2016 Matchweek 22	Omonia	3–1	AEK Larnaca	GSP Stadium, Nicosia
15:00	Bebê 12'; Schembri 56' (pen.), 90+2'	Report	Catala (yellow card) 21' (yellow-red card) 64'; Tete 45+2'	Attendance: 7,545; Referee: (Cyprus) Giannis Anastasiou

13-02-2016 Matchweek 23	APOEL	2–0	Omonia	GSP Stadium, Nicosia
13:00	Efrem 8', 42'	Report		Attendance: 12,017; Referee: (Cyprus) Vasilis Demetriou

20-02-2016 Matchweek 24	Omonia	2–1	Aris Limassol	GSP Stadium, Nicosia
16:00	Assis 28', 44'	Report	Ranos 75'	Attendance: 4,450; Referee: (Cyprus) Giorgos Nikolaou

27-02-2016 Matchweek 25	Enosis Neon Paralimni	1–4	Omonia	Tasos Markos Stadium, Paralimni
14:00	Bukorac 39'	Report	Runje 22'; Badibanga 27'; Sheridan 49'; Kirm 88'	Attendance: 1,000; Referee: (Cyprus) Vasilis Demetriou

03-03-2016 Matchweek 26	Omonia	4–2	AEL Limassol	GSP Stadium, Nicosia
14:00	Kirm 43', 57'; Badibanga 59', 86'	Report	Piech 31'; Aganović 75'	Attendance: 4,063; Referee: (Cyprus) Leontios Trattou

=== Play-offs table ===
==== Group A ====
Pos	Team	Pld	W	D	L	GF	GA	GD	Pts	Qualification
2	AEK Larnaca	36	23	6	7	61	34	+27	75	Qualification for the Europa League first qualifying round
3	Apollon Limassol	36	19	11	6	61	36	+25	68	Qualification for the Europa League third qualifying round (Note: Apollon Limassol qualified for the Europa League third qualifying round by winning the 2015–16 Cypriot Cup.)
4	Omonia	36	20	7	9	63	34	+29	67	Qualification for the Europa League first qualifying round
5	Anorthosis Famagusta	36	16	11	9	57	41	+16	59	
6	Nea Salamis Famagusta	36	9	10	17	44	72	−28	37	

Source: UEFA, CFA, Soccerway
Rules for classification: 1) Points; 2) Head-to-head points; 3) Head-to-head goal difference; 4) Head-to-head goals scored; 5) Head-to-head away goals scored (only if two teams); 6) Goal difference; 7) Goals scored; 8) Play-off (only if deciding champion or UEFA competitions).

===== Results =====
06-03-2016 Matchweek 27	Omonia	3–0	Anorthosis	GSP Stadium, Nicosia
16:00	Badibanga 2'; Sheridan 7', 51'	Report		Attendance: 7,660; Referee: (Cyprus) Christos Nikolaides

12-03-2016 Matchweek 28	APOEL	2–1	Omonia	GSP Stadium, Nicosia
16:00	Efrem 42'; Vieira 84'	Report	Bebê 34'	Attendance: 10,264; Referee: (Cyprus) Demetris Masias

19-03-2016 Matchweek 29	Nea Salamina	1–2	Omonia	Ammochostos Stadium, Larnaca
16:00	Makriev 83'	Report	Schembri 36'; Sheridan 73'	Attendance: 1,100; Referee: (Cyprus) Loukas Soteriou

03-04-2016 Matchweek 30	AC Omonia	0–1	AEK Larnaca	GSP Stadium, Nicosia
16:00		Report	Tričkovski 27'	Attendance: 7,728; Referee: (Cyprus) Giannis Anastasiou

09-04-2016 Matchweek 31	Apollon	1–2	Omonia	Tsirion Stadium, Limassol
16:00	Freire 13'	Report	Schembri 77', 88'	Attendance: 3,442; Referee: (Cyprus) Leontios Trattou

16-04-2016 Matchweek 32	Anorthosis	0–3	Omonia	Antonis Papadopoulos Stadium, Larnaca
16:00		Report	Assis 49'; Ramos 58'; Sheridan 73'	Attendance: 6,000; Referee: (Cyprus) Christos Nikolaides

23-04-2016 Matchweek 33	Omonia	0–2	APOEL	GSP Stadium, Nicosia
16:00		Report	Gianniotas 23', 44'	Attendance: 12,928; Referee: (Cyprus) Christos Nikolaides

27-04-2016 Matchweek 34	Omonia	2–0	Nea Salamina	GSP Stadium, Nicosia
14:00	Sheridan 82'; Schembri 90+2'	Report		Attendance: 2,875; Referee: (Cyprus) Giorgos Nikolaou

07-05-2016 Matchweek 35	AEK Larnaca	1-3	Omonia	GSZ Stadium, Larnaca
17:00	Alves 60' (p.g)	Report	O.Roushias 17'; D.Christofi 37'; Assis 82'	Attendance: 900; Referee: (Cyprus) Yiannis Anastasiou

14-05-2016 Matchweek 36	Omonia	1-2	Apollon	GSP Stadium, Nicosia
16:00				Attendance: 2,316; Referee: (Cyprus) Leontios Trattos

=== UEFA Europa League ===
==== First qualifying round ====
02-07-2015 First leg	Dinamo Batumi (Georgia (country))	1-0	(Cyprus) Omonia	David Abashidze Stadium, Zestaponi
18:00 EET	Gabedava 40'	Report		Attendance: 3,589; Referee: (Slovenia) Mitja Žganec

09-07-2015 Second leg	Omonia (Cyprus)	2-0 (2–1 agg.)	(Georgia (country)) Dinamo Batumi	GSP Stadium, Nicosia
18:00 EET	Goulon 56'; Schembri 62'	Report		Attendance: 13,532; Referee: (Portugal) Fábio Veríssimo

==== Second qualifying round ====
16-07-2015 First leg	Jagiellonia Białystok (Poland)	0-0	(Cyprus) Omonia	City Stadium, Białystok
20:30 EET		Report		Attendance: 16,067; Referee: (Sweden) Bojan Pandžić

23-07-2015 Second leg	Omonia (Cyprus)	1-0 (1-0 agg.)	(Poland) Jagiellonia Białystok	GSP Stadium, Nicosia
18:00 EET	Sheridan 8'	Report		Attendance: 17,481; Referee: (Serbia) Danilo Grujić

==== Third qualifying round ====
30-07-2015 First leg	Brøndby (Denmark)	0-0	(Cyprus) Omonia	Brøndby Stadium, Brøndby
20:00 EET		Report		Attendance: 7,427; Referee: (Czech Republic) Libor Kovařík

06-08-2015 Second leg	Omonia (Cyprus)	2-2 (2-2 agg.)	(Denmark) Brøndby	GSP Stadium, Nicosia
18:00 EET	Sheridan 16' (pen.), 45+3' (pen.)	Report	Pukki 2', 39'	Attendance: 17,943; Referee: (Austria) Harald Lechner

=== Cypriot Cup ===
==== First round ====
28-10-2015	Omonia	2−0	PAEEK FC	GSP Stadium, Nicosia
17:00 EET	Sheridan 17'; Kirm 90+1'			Attendance: 2,000; Referee: Nicolas Neocleous

==== Second round ====
06-01-2016 First leg	Omonia	2−0	Ethnikos Achna	GSP Stadium, Nicosia
16:00 EET	Iacob 51' (o.g.); Margaça 55'	Report		Attendance: 4,646; Referee: Andreas Orthodoxou

20-01-2016 Second leg	Ethnikos Achna	1−3 (1–5 agg.)	Omonia	Dasaki Stadium, Achna
19:00 EET	Poutziouris 45'	Report	Assis 18'; Roushias 70', 88'	Attendance: 800; Referee: Thomas Mouskos

==== Quarter-finals ====
03-02-2016 First leg	Omonia	4−0	Pafos FC	GSP Stadium, Nicosia
17:00 EET	Schembri 26'; Badibanga 29', 64'; Christofi 79'	Report		Attendance: 3,529; Referee: Giorgos Nicolaou

17-02-2016 Second leg	Pafos FC	0−4 (0–8 agg.)	Omonia	Pafiako Stadium, Pafos
17:00 EET		Report	Kasmi 40'; Okeuhie 42'; Hafez 64'; Kirm 68'	Attendance: 300; Referee: Avraam Tsoukkas

==== Semi-finals ====
06-04-2016 First leg	AEK Larnaca	0−0	Omonia	GSZ Stadium, Larnaca
19:00 EET		Report		Attendance: 3,584; Referee: Christos Nicolaides

20-04-2016 Second leg	Omonia	0−0 (a.e.t.) (0–0 agg.) (5–3 p)	AEK Larnaca	GSP Stadium, Nicosia
19:00 EET		Report		Attendance: 13,068; Referee: Demetris Masias
	Penalties
	Sheridan (penalty scored); Hafez (penalty scored); Runje (penalty scored); Badibanga (penalty scored); Schembri (penalty scored)		Boljević (penalty missed); Alves (penalty scored); Tomàs (penalty scored); Ninu (penalty scored)

==== Final ====
18-05-2016	Apollon	2−1	Omonia	Tsirion Stadium, Limassol
18:30 EEST	Papoulis 5' Angeli 72'	Report	Margaça 54'	Attendance: 12076; Referee: A.Vučemilović
