= André Schembri =

Association football player (born 1986)

Personal information
- Date of birth: 27 May 1986 (age 40)
- Place of birth: Pietà, Malta
- Height: 1.78 m (5 ft 10 in)
- Positions: Forward; attacking midfielder

Team information
- Current team: Nea Salamis Famagusta (assistant manager)

Youth career
- Floriana
- Hibernians

Senior career*
Years	Team	Apps	(Gls)
2002–2005	Hibernians	44	(10)
2005–2009	Marsaxlokk	51	(24)
2007–2008	→ Eintracht Braunschweig (loan)	29	(9)
2008–2009	→ Carl Zeiss Jena (loan)	32	(4)
2009–2010	Austria Kärnten	13	(1)
2010–2011	Ferencváros II	3	(3)
2010–2011	Ferencváros	36	(16)
2011	Olympiacos Volos	0	(0)
2011–2012	Panionios	21	(4)
2012–2014	Omonia	58	(24)
2014	FSV Frankfurt	9	(0)
2014–2016	Omonia	45	(19)
2016–2017	Boavista	30	(3)
2017–2019	Apollon Limassol	57	(10)
2019–2020	Chennaiyin	18	(5)
Total		446	(131)

International career
2004–2006	Malta U21	13	(4)
2006–2018	Malta	94	(3)

Managerial career
- 2024: Anagennisi Deryneia
- 2025–: Nea Salamis Famagusta FC (assistant manager)
- * Club domestic league appearances and goals

André Schembri (born 27 May 1986) is a Maltese former professional footballer who played as an attacking midfielder and forward.

Schembri started his professional career with local clubs Hibernians and Marsaxlokk, leading the latter to their first league title in the 2006–07 season. Between the summers of 2007 and 2009 he spent season-long loans with German lower-tier clubs Eintracht Braunschweig and Carl Zeiss Jena. After a blighted six months with Austria Kärnten, he joined Hungarian side Ferencváros where he established himself as first choice ending the season as the club's top scorer with 17 goals in all competitions.

In the summer of 2011, Schembri joined Olympiacos Volos. However, after a few games the club was demoted to the fourth-tier of Greek football following a match-fixing scandal. Schembri then joined Panionios. After completing the 2011–12 season, Schembri was signed by Cypriot club Omonia. With them he slowly established himself in the forward line, finishing his second season as the league's second highest goalscorer with 17 goals. After a short stint with German club FSV Frankfurt, he returned to Omonia in December 2014.

With interest from foreign clubs, Portuguese side Boavista signed Schembri. Although initially making the first eleven, the arrival of a new manager midway through the season led to him being dropped to a substitute role. With lack of opportunities, Schembri returned to Cyprus, joining Apollon Limassol in the summer of 2017. He quickly became a prominent figure, scoring four goals in six qualifying matches as he helped the club make it through to the group stages of the UEFA Europa League. In this same competition he also became the first Maltese to score in the proper rounds of a UEFA competition. In August 2017, he won his first trophy outside his home country as Apollon Limassol triumphed in the Cypriot Super Cup, with Schembri also scoring the winning goal.

At the international level, he represented Malta at youth levels, before making his senior debut on 4 June 2006 against Japan. His first goals came in the historic 2–1 win over Hungary, scoring twice as Malta won their first competitive game in 13 years. Regarded as one of the best Maltese football exports, he amassed 94 appearances for the national team, the eighth-highest number of appearances at the time of his retirement in October 2018.

== Club career ==
=== Early career ===
Schembri started out as a trainee with Hibernians making his first team debut in the 2002–03 season. The following season, he scored his first goal in the 2–1 win over Balzan Youths on 31 August 2003. He made his debut in a European competition on 19 June 2004, in the Intertoto Cup first round match against Slaven Belupo. Hibernians won the match 2–1 with Schembri scoring the winner. Midway through the 2004–05 season, there were disagreements between Schembri and the club, and with a possible transfer in sight Sliema Wanderers and Marsaxlokk became interested in his acquisition. In the end, Marsaxlokk finalised the transfer and Schembri joined the club on 29 January 2005. His first goal came in the 2–1 win over Msida Saint-Joseph played on 5 February. His first full season at the club ended with 11 goals to his name, a feat he repeated in the 2006–07 season as Marsaxlokk were crowned league champions for the first time. During the league-winning campaign, Schembri formed an attacking partnership with Daniel Bogdanović who between them scored 42 out of Marsaxlokk's 74 goals.

=== German stint ===
In the summer of 2007, with interest from foreign clubs including OFI Crete, Schembri joined Eintracht Braunschweig on a season-long loan. Playing in the Regionalliga Nord, the third-tier in German football, Schembri made his debut on 31 July in the 2–3 defeat against VfL Wolfsburg II, coming on as a second-half substitute for Lars Fuchs. His first goals came on the tenth matchday, scoring a hat-trick against Energie Cottbus II on 21 September in a 5–0 win. For the final league game of the season, Schembri was suspended by the club for selecting to play in a friendly match for the Maltese national team instead of the promotion decider against Borussia Dortmund II. He finished the season with nine goals, the last being against VfB Lübeck, ending as the club's third top-scorer for the season as Eintracht Braunschweig qualified to the newly-formed 3. Liga.

Schembri's stay in Germany was extended to a further year as in June 2008 he joined 3. Liga side Carl Zeiss Jena on another loan. His first game was on 26 July, when he came in as an 84th-minute substitute for Salvatore Amirante during a 2–2 draw against Jahn Regensburg in a league match. His first goal at the club arrived in the first round of the DFB-Pokal, scoring the opener in the 2–1 win over 1. FC Kaiserslautern. He found the net again in the round of 16 tie against Bundesliga side Schalke which ended in a 1–4 defeat. He finished the season by scoring two goals in the last two matchdays, including the equaliser against Sandhausen, which guaranteed Carl Zeiss Jena's stay in the 3. Liga.

After his contract expired with Marsaxlokk, Schembri joined Austria Kärnten on a two-year deal on 19 June 2009. Amid the club's financial problems and a disappointing start to the season which saw them sitting at the bottom of the table, Schembri was one of few players who was allowed to be released in January 2010. His only goal for the Austrian club came in a 2–3 defeat against Kapfenberger SV on 26 July.

=== Ferencváros ===
Ferencváros signed Schembri in February 2010, teaming up with compatriot Justin Haber who joined the Hungarian club from Sheffield United. He made his debut on 12 March in the 0–0 draw against Nyíregyháza Spartacus. He quickly became a key figure in Ferencváros' attack and was rewarded with a new contract at the end of the season. With the arrival of new manager László Prukner, Schembri was moved as the main forward for Fradi and rose to prominence during the 2010–11 season, scoring his first goal on 1 September in a 3–0 win over Győr. He scored his first hat-trick against Vasas in a 3–1 win, becoming the first Maltese footballer to score a hat-trick in a foreign top-tier league. Two months later, on 20 November, he netted another hat-trick against Lombard Pápa in the 5–0 away win. He added to his tally braces against MTK Budapest and Zalaegerszegi, to finish off the season as the club's highest goalscorer, and the league's second highest, with 16 goals. Ferencváros finished third as they qualified to the first qualifying round of the UEFA Europa League, making a return to European football after a six-year absence.

=== Olympiacos Volos ===
Schembri's contract with Ferencváros ended at the end of the 2010–11 season, and despite concrete interest from Serie A side Chievo, he joined Olympiacos Volos on 7 July 2011. He made his debut a week later, on 14 July, as a last-minute substitute against Rad in the second qualifying round of the Europa League, scoring his first goal for the club in the third qualifying round match played on 28 July, a 3–0 win over Differdange. On the same day, the Greek Super League's disciplinary committee announced the demotion of Olympiakos Volou and Kavala to the Beta Ethniki, the second tier in Greek football, for their involvement in a match-fixing scandal. As the club failed to obtain a license, they were relegated to the Delta Ethniki, the fourth tier in Greek football, as well as being excluded from the current Europa League campaign and given a three-year ban from any European competition by UEFA. As a result of this, the Greek Federation allowed the rescinding of players' contracts and to join other clubs outside of the transfer window.

=== Panionios ===
Following the rescinding of his contract with Olympiacos Volos and his preference to stay in Greece, Schembri joined Panionios, signing a one-year contract on 30 September 2011. He made his debut in the sixth league matchday on 16 October, in the 0–0 draw against PAS Giannina, scoring his first goal in the 1–2 defeat against Atromitos on 29 October. In the match against Aris on 27 November, he scored once and assisted on the winning goal in the 2–1 win, being praised by the media for his performance. At the end of the season, which he concluded with five goals to his name, Panionios and Schembri failed to reach an agreement on his salary and the contract was not renewed.

=== Omonia ===
On 20 August 2012, Cypriot club Omonia signed Schembri on a two-year deal. Before signing for Omonia there was interest from Sampdoria which were ready to make a deal had they not won promotion to Serie A. The first game played was the home win over Ayia Napa on 2 September, scoring on his first start for the club against Enosis on 27 October in a 2–0 win. He ended the season scoring eight goals as Omonia finished third and gained access to the UEFA Europa League second qualifying round. The following season, despite the early exit from the UEFA competition, Schembri further solidified his place and scored his first goal of the season and assisted the third goal in the 4–0 win over Enosis on 14 September 2013. He wrapped up the first round of the championship with 11 goals, including braces against Doxa and Anorthosis Famagusta, as Omonia qualified to the Championship round. With six additional goals in this round, Schembri took his season tally to 17 goals, ending as the league's second highest goalscorer.

During the summer of 2014, with the chance of joining a higher-level league, Schembri joined 2. Bundesliga side FSV Frankfurt. His return in Germany and teaming up with Benno Möhlmann, his former head coach at Eintracht Braunschweig, proved to be a disappointing one as it lasted only six months. With lack of space in the first eleven and a single goal against Hoffenheim in the DFB-Pokal, Schembri rescinded his contract in December. In the same month he agreed to re-join Omonia on an 18-month contract.

In the first game back with Omonia he scored a goal in the 2–0 win over Ethnikos Achna on 10 January 2015. He was instrumental in leading Omonia to the semi-finals of the Cypriot Cup, scoring six goals in six appearances including a hat-trick against Karmiotissa. Omonia qualified to compete in the UEFA Europa League first qualifying round and on 9 July, Schembri scored the winner against Dinamo Batumi which gave Omonia access to the successive round. His goals contribution alongside that of striker Cillian Sheridan helped Omonia push to the top of the table, with Schembri being employed most of the time as the only forward. He finished the league season with 15 goals, although Omonia lost the Cypriot Cup final against Apollon Limassol.

=== Boavista ===
With Schembri's contract coming up at the end of the season, talks between the two parties for an extension were held mid-season amid interest from other Cypriot and Asian clubs. In the end, on 16 June 2016, Primeira Liga club Boavista officially announced Schembri's transfer. In an interview with newspaper Record, Schembri described how he refused other offers with higher salaries in order to fulfill his desire to move to a better league. He made his debut in the opening day of the 2016–17 season in the 2–0 win over Arouca, before being replaced by Diogo Caldas. Schembri scored his first goal, the opener, in the 2–2 draw against Chaves played on 28 August. During the first half of the season he was a mainstay in Boavista's starting eleven under both Erwin Sánchez and his replacement Miguel Leal, even scoring the third goal in a 3–3 draw against Benfica in a match where Boavista were 3–0 up after 25 minutes. With the arrival of Peruvian striker Iván Bulos during the January transfer window he lost his place in the starting eleven, mostly being introduced in the games from the substitutes' bench. In the last game of the season played at home against champions-elect Benfica, Schembri scored the momentary 2–0 goal as Benfica relayed back to level the game in injury time. With lack of space in the first team by the end of the season and with possibly not figuring in manager Miguel Leal's plans for the following season, Schembri and Boavista came to a mutual agreement to rescind his contract ending his stay at the Porto-based club.

=== Apollon Limassol ===
On 13 June 2017, Schembri signed with Apollon Limassol, returning to Cyprus after his earlier stint with Omonia. In his first game played on 13 July, he scored the first in a 3–0 win over Zaria Bălți in the UEFA Europa League second qualifying round. He scored his second goal in as many games in the second leg match played the following week, as Apollon made it through to the third qualifying round. Schembri's form in the Europa League resumed as in the following rounds he struck important goals against Aberdeen (in a 3–2 aggregate win) and Midtjylland (in a 4–3 aggregate win) with Apollon qualifying to the group stage. He ended the qualifying round scoring four goals in six matches and became the second Maltese player to feature in the UEFA Europa League after Luke Dimech. In the Cypriot Super Cup final against APOEL on 9 August, Schembri was introduced as a second-half replacement for Antonio Jakoliš and three minutes from time he scored the winning goal in a 2–1 win for Apollon, their fourth trophy in history. In the group stage match against Atalanta played on 19 October, Schembri scored the temporary equaliser in an eventual 1–3 defeat, although he did not celebrate due to that the death of Maltese journalist Daphne Caruana Galizia. With this goal he became the first Maltese player to score in the proper rounds of a UEFA competition. His first season back in Cyprus ended with him scoring 14 goals, including a goal in the Cypriot Cup final defeat against AEK Larnaca.

Near the end of the 2018–19 season, Schembri announced that he would leave Apollon at the end of the league campaign. His last game was the 1–2 defeat against Nea Salamis played on 22 May, in which he scored Apollon's only goal.

=== Chennaiyin ===
On 27 August 2019, Schembri signed a one-year contract with Indian Super League (ISL) side Chennaiyin, becoming the first Maltese player to play in India. He made his debut in the first league game of the season, starting in a 3–0 defeat against Goa. His first goal came on 25 November 2019, scoring the opener after coming off the bench in a 2–1 win over Hyderabad, to mark Chennaiyin's first league win of the season. In the same game, he also assisted Nerijus Valskis for the winner in the final minutes of the match. With four additional goals, he helped Chennaiyin finish fourth and qualifying for the Indian Super League playoffs. On 9 March 2020, Schembri announced his retirement from professional football, with his last game being the ISL final against ATK on 14 March.

== International career ==
"Schembri was like some kind of footballing kamikaze. Or perhaps just a kamikaze of love. He certainly had no interest in the ball – he treated it as if it was burst and thus completely without purpose. The only thing that counted was my presence at his side, or, more accurately, his presence at mine. We rolled along together, me and my imperfect shadow. I'd move, and he'd follow. I'd slow down, and he'd pull up the handbrake, too. I was the victim of a close encounter of the third kind."

— Andrea Pirlo, in his autobiography

Schembri was capped at various youth levels for Malta, starting from the under-14s up to the under-21s. His first game in a UEFA competition was on 5 March 2002 against Armenia, a qualifier for the 2002 UEFA Under-17 Championship, won 1–0.

On 4 June 2006, Schembri made his debut with the Maltese national team in a friendly against Japan, which ended in a 1–0 defeat. His first goals arrived in his fifth cap, in a UEFA Euro qualifier match against Hungary played at Ta' Qali's National Stadium on 11 October 2006. Schembri gave Malta the lead after 14 minutes when following Michael Mifsud's shot which hit the crossbar, he slotted the ball in the net. Hungary equalised five minutes later from a Sándor Torghelle header, however Malta retook the lead six minutes in the second half when Gilbert Agius played a through-ball to Schembri who rounded Gábor Király and slid the ball in an empty net. The match ended in a 2–1 win, with this marking Malta's first competitive win in 13 years, their first win in a UEFA European Championship match in 24 years and their first home win in a competitive match in 31 years. Schembri became a regular figure in Malta's starting eleven and in the same qualifier competition he scored his third international goal, against Turkey, in the fixture played on 8 September 2007. After both teams finished the first half at 1–1, Schembri received a ball from Mifsud and put it past goalkeeper Hakan Arıkan. Turkey equalised a couple of minutes later from Servet Çetin, as the match ended in a 2–2 scoreline.

Schembri captained Malta for the first time on 25 March 2015, in a friendly against Georgia; he ultimately served as captain 16 times. After a 2–0 defeat in the 2018 FIFA World Cup qualifier against England, played on 8 October 2016, Schembri criticised the Malta Football Association (MFA), the governing body of football in Malta, for the lack of progress done in Maltese football and the lack of initiative in the youth football setups. His stance was supported by many, with the association's president acknowledging the disappointing results in the last 20 years, although he asserted that the MFA had been working in sending Maltese youth to trials abroad. For the following match against Lithuania on 11 October, Schembri was removed as captain and replaced by Michael Mifsud, with the insistence that the decision was a tactical one. In October 2018, he reiterated his stance on the stagnation of Maltese football and the lack of concrete ideas by the governing body to improve it, although he praised the MFA's initiative in assisting youth footballers to foreign leagues.

On 13 November 2018, Schembri announced that he would be retiring from international football following the end of the UEFA Nations League campaign, citing his wish to prolong his club career and to give an opportunity to the younger generation. His last match was on 20 November in the 1–1 draw against the Faroe Islands, finishing off with his 94th appearance.

== Post-playing career ==
Following his retirement, in June 2020, Schembri was hired as a youth coach for Apollon Limassol, coaching the under-15 team. A year later, he was appointed as football director of the club. After a year in this role, in June 2022, Schembri returned to coaching and took over the under-19 team; during that time he also briefly served as an assistant coach with the first team. On 2 June 2024, he was appointed as coach of Anagennisi Deryneia, a club playing in the Cypriot Second Division.

He is a graduate with a sports science degree from the University of Hull, as well as a UEFA B license holder.

== Style of play ==
Schembri's versatility in forward roles saw him deployed in numerous positions, including an attacking midfielder, a second striker or even a pure striker, as well as playing on the wings.

== Personal life ==
Schembri is the son of Eric Schembri and grandson of Salvinu Schembri, both former footballers and Maltese internationals. He married Clarissa Ellul, a television presenter, on 3 June 2016 at St. Paul's Church in Rabat. In June 2018, he published an autobiographical book, André Schembri – 10 snin nilgħab fl-Ewropa (André Schembri – 10 years playing in Europe), the first one by a Maltese footballer, detailing his struggles and successes during his career. Since 2017, Schembri and Apollon Limassol have been supporting Dr. Klown, a Maltese non-governmental organisation which provide clown doctor services.

== Career statistics ==
=== Club ===
Appearances and goals by club, season and competition
Club	Season	League			Cup (Note: Includes the DFB-Pokal (Germany), ÖFB-Cup (Austria), Magyar Kupa, Ligakupa (Hungary), Kypello Ellados (Greece), Kypello Kyprou (Cyprus), Taça de Portugal (Portugal))		Continental (Note: Includes the UEFA Europa League qualifying round and final stage)		Other (Note: Includes the Cypriot Super Cup)		Total	
Club	Season	Division	Apps	Goals	Apps	Goals	Apps	Goals	Apps	Goals	Apps	Goals
Hibernians	2002–03	Maltese Premier League	7	0	—		—		—		7	0
Hibernians	2003–04	Maltese Premier League	26	5	—		—		—		26	5
Hibernians	2004–05	Maltese Premier League	11	5	—		2	1	—		13	6
Hibernians	Total		44	10	0	0	2	1	0	0	46	11
Marsaxlokk	2004–05	Maltese Premier League	8	2	—		—		—		8	2
Marsaxlokk	2005–06	Maltese Premier League	24	11	—		—		—		24	11
Marsaxlokk	2006–07	Maltese Premier League	19	11	—		2	1	—		21	12
Marsaxlokk	Total		51	24	0	0	2	1	0	0	53	25
Eintracht Braunschweig	2007–08	Regionalliga Nord	29	9	0	0	—		—		29	9
Carl Zeiss Jena	2008–09	3. Liga	32	4	3	2	—		—		35	6
Austria Kärnten	2009–10	Austrian Football Bundesliga	13	1	2	1	—		—		15	2
Ferencváros II	2009–10	Nemzeti Bajnokság III	3	3	—		—		—		3	3
Ferencváros	2009–10	Nemzeti Bajnokság I	9	0	6	0	—		—		15	0
Ferencváros	2010–11	Nemzeti Bajnokság I	27	16	1	1	—		—		28	17
Ferencváros	Total		36	16	7	1	0	0	0	0	43	17
Olympiacos Volos	2011–12	Super League Greece	0	0	—		4	1	—		4	1
Panionios	2011–12	Super League Greece	21	4	3	1	—		—		24	5
Omonia	2012–13	Cypriot First Division	25	7	5	2	—		—		30	9
Omonia	2013–14	Cypriot First Division	33	17	2	0	2	0	—		37	17
Omonia	Total		58	24	7	2	2	0	0	0	67	26
FSV Frankfurt	2014–15	2. Bundesliga	9	0	2	1	—		—		11	1
Omonia	2014–15	Cypriot First Division	15	4	6	6	—		—		21	10
Omonia	2015–16	Cypriot First Division	30	15	6	1	6	1	—		42	17
Omonia	Total		45	19	12	7	6	1	0	0	63	27
Boavista	2016–17	Primeira Liga	30	3	1	1	—		—		31	4
Apollon Limassol	2017–18	Cypriot First Division	29	5	6	3	12	5	1	1	48	14
Apollon Limassol	2018–19	Cypriot First Division	28	5	5	1	10	0	—		43	6
Apollon Limassol	Total		57	10	11	4	22	5	1	1	91	20
Chennaiyin FC	2019–20	Indian Super League	18	5	—		—		—		18	5
Career total			446	131	48	20	38	9	1	1	533	161

=== International ===
Appearances and goals by national team and year
National team	Year	Apps	Goals
Malta national team	2006	6	2
Malta national team	2007	11	1
Malta national team	2008	6	0
Malta national team	2009	7	0
Malta national team	2010	2	0
Malta national team	2011	7	0
Malta national team	2012	7	0
Malta national team	2013	9	0
Malta national team	2014	7	0
Malta national team	2015	6	0
Malta national team	2016	7	0
Malta national team	2017	8	0
Malta national team	2018	8	0
Total		94	3

Scores and results list Malta's goal tally first, score column indicates score after each Schembri goal.

List of international goals scored by André Schembri
No.	Date	Venue	Opponent	Score	Result	Competition
1	11 October 2006	National Stadium, Ta' Qali, Ta' Qali, Malta	Hungary	1–0	2–1	UEFA Euro 2008 qualification
2	11 October 2006	National Stadium, Ta' Qali, Ta' Qali, Malta	Hungary	2–1	2–1	UEFA Euro 2008 qualification
3	8 September 2007	National Stadium, Ta' Qali, Ta' Qali, Malta	Turkey	2–1	2–2	UEFA Euro 2008 qualification

== Honours ==
Marsaxlokk

- Maltese Premier League: 2006–07

Apollon Limassol

- Cypriot Super Cup: 2017

Individual

- Malta's Sportsman of the Year: 2010
