= José Moreira =

Portuguese footballer (born 1982)

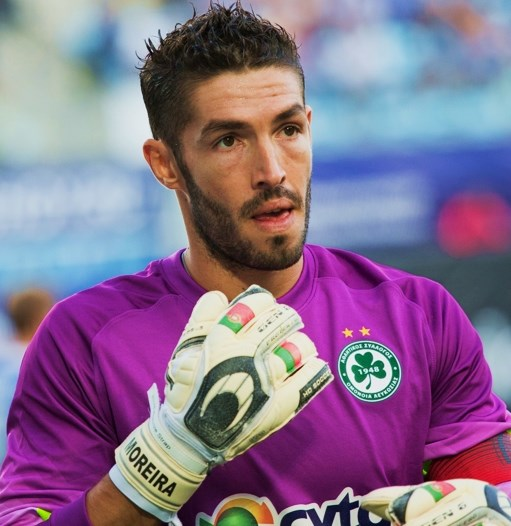
- Moreira with Omonia in 2014

Personal information
- Full name: José Filipe da Silva Moreira
- Date of birth: 20 March 1982 (age 44)
- Place of birth: Massarelos, Portugal
- Height: 1.84 m (6 ft 0 in)
- Position: Goalkeeper

Youth career
- 1991–1999: Salgueiros
- 1999: Benfica

Senior career*
| Years | Team | Apps | (Gls) |
| 1999–2001 | Benfica B | 31 | (0) |
| 2001–2011 | Benfica | 112 | (0) |
| 2011–2012 | Swansea City | 0 | (0) |
| 2013–2015 | Omonia | 62 | (0) |
| 2015–2016 | Olhanense | 40 | (0) |
| 2016–2018 | Estoril | 45 | (0) |
| 2018–2019 | Cova Piedade | 26 | (0) |
| Total | | 316 | (0) |

International career
| 1998 | Portugal U15 | 4 | (0) |
| 1997–1999 | Portugal U16 | 22 | (0) |
| 1999 | Portugal U17 | 9 | (0) |
| 1999–2001 | Portugal U18 | 9 | (0) |
| 2001–2002 | Portugal U20 | 13 | (0) |
| 2002–2004 | Portugal U21 | 22 | (0) |
| 2004 | Portugal U23 | 4 | (0) |
| 2004 | Portugal B | 3 | (0) |
| 2009 | Portugal | 1 | (0) |
Medal record
Men's football
Representing Portugal
UEFA European Championship
| Runner-up | 2004 Portugal |
UEFA European Under-21 Championship
| Third place | 2004 Germany |
- * Club domestic league appearances and goals

José Filipe da Silva Moreira OIH (born 20 March 1982) is a Portuguese former professional footballer who played as a goalkeeper.

He spent most of his career with Benfica, appearing in 148 competitive matches and making his Primeira Liga debut at 19. He also competed in Wales and Cyprus.

Moreira earned 79 caps for Portugal across all youth levels, and was part of the senior team squad at Euro 2004.

== Club career ==
=== Early years ===
Born in Massarelos, Porto, Moreira preferred to play as an attacking midfielder in his early years but, following the advice of his father José, soon changed his position and took trials for S.C. Salgueiros.

In 1997, aged 15, Moreira caught the eye of the biggest Portuguese teams — Sporting CP, FC Porto, Boavista F.C. and S.L. Benfica. The latter made the best bid to Salgueiros and won the race to sign him, but it was later decided it was best to keep him at the club for two more years; when he arrived to the Estádio da Luz he was called for a mini-tour with the main squad in the Azores, going on to make his unofficial senior debut.

=== Benfica ===
In 1999, Moreira was selected by Portugal under–18 coach Agostinho Oliveira for the UEFA European Championship in Sweden, with the national team winning the title. Subsequently, he returned to Benfica, being called by Jupp Heynckes to join the pre-season tour in Austria; at the time, two of the three senior goalkeepers were not available (Carlos Bossio was in Argentina and Nuno Santos was injured, leaving Robert Enke as the only available keeper). He was an unused substitute in several matches during August/December 1999, but would only play two years later in a home game against Vitória de Guimarães, replacing the injured Enke after 24 minutes and delivering a clean sheet in a 0–0 draw.

Moreira conquered the junior national championship in 2000, adding the following year's Toulon Tournament with the under-21s after beating Colombia in the final. He started on 9 March 2002 in the 2–0 away win over Gil Vicente F.C. and, when German Enke left at the end of the season for Spain's FC Barcelona, he became first-choice from then on.

Moreira made his debut in European competitions in 2003–04, playing in the UEFA Cup against Molde FK (3–1 home victory). The campaign ended with Benfica, led by José Antonio Camacho, winning the Taça de Portugal after beating José Mourinho's Porto; he renewed his link in April 2004 until 2010, joining the Portugal B squad for the Vale do Tejo International Tournament shortly after to win the tournament and be chosen best goalkeeper in the competition.

With the arrival of Quim from S.C. Braga in August 2004, Moreira began suffering stiff competition for the starting job. He contributed 15 games as the side won the Primeira Liga title after 11 years but, on 18 October 2005, underwent surgery to his right knee, missing most of 2005–06.

Upon his return, Moreira found himself having to compete for backup duties with recently signed Brazilian Marcelo Moretto, the same happening in the 2006–07 season. Moretto was then loaned to Greece's AEK Athens F.C. in August 2007.

The 2007–08 campaign brought a new challenge to Moreira, as the club signed 33-year-old Hans-Jörg Butt, known for taking free kicks and penalties. He suffered another injury during pre-season, this time on his left knee, which forced him to again undergo surgery and be sidelined for four months.

In a turbulent 2008–09, where all three goalkeepers went from first to third-choice in a matter of weeks, Moreira appeared in 14 league matches as Benfica finished third. Following the arrival of another Brazilian, Júlio César, from C.F. Os Belenenses in the next off-season alongside manager Jorge Jesus, he further fell down the pecking order. In June 2010, as his contract was not renewed, he was on the verge of leaving after 12 years, with speculation arising that he would join Lisbon neighbours Sporting; after Quim was released, however, he put pen to paper a new three-year deal.

Moreira was again third-string in 2010–11, behind Júlio César and newly signed Roberto. He did appear in several games in the Taça da Liga, including the final against F.C. Paços de Ferreira where he stopped a penalty from Manuel José in an eventual 2–1 win, Benfica's third consecutive in the tournament.

=== Later career ===
On 8 July 2011, Moreira joined newly promoted Premier League club Swansea City for an undisclosed fee. He only made one competitive appearance during the season, a 3–1 away loss to Shrewsbury Town in the second round of the Football League Cup, and his contract was terminated by mutual consent on 17 May 2012.

In late January 2013, Moreira moved to AC Omonia from Cyprus. He returned to Portugal in summer 2015, joining S.C. Olhanense. He made his debut on 12 September, in a 0–0 Segunda Liga home draw against C.D. Aves.

Moreira returned to the Portuguese top flight for the 2016–17 campaign, signing a two-year contract with G.D. Estoril Praia. On 25 June 2018, after suffering relegation, he returned to the second division after agreeing to a one-year deal at C.D. Cova da Piedade.

On 28 July 2019, Moreira announced his retirement aged 37.

== International career ==
Moreira represented Portugal from under-15 to under-21 levels. He was picked by senior team manager Luiz Felipe Scolari alongside Ricardo and Quim for UEFA Euro 2004 which was contested on home soil, but did not take any part in the tournament.

In a one-and-half-month period in the summer of 2004, Moreira represented Portugal at the European Under-21 Championship in Germany and acted as backup at Euro 2004, before a trip to Athens for the Summer Olympics, where he started.

On 12 August 2009, five years after his Euro 2004 selection, Moreira finally made his full debut, playing 30 minutes in a friendly win in Liechtenstein (3–0).

== Career statistics ==
Appearances and goals by club, season and competition
| Club | Season | League | | | National cup | | League cup | | Continental | | Other | | Total | |
| Club | Season | Division | Apps | Goals | Apps | Goals | Apps | Goals | Apps | Goals | Apps | Goals | Apps | Goals |
|---|---|---|---|---|---|---|---|---|---|---|---|---|---|---|
| Benfica | 2001–02 | Primeira Liga | 10 | 0 | 0 | 0 | — | | 0 | 0 | 0 | 0 | 10 | 0 |
| Benfica | 2002–03 | Primeira Liga | 31 | 0 | 0 | 0 | — | | 0 | 0 | 0 | 0 | 31 | 0 |
| Benfica | 2003–04 | Primeira Liga | 33 | 0 | 3 | 0 | — | | 10 (Note: Appearances in UEFA Cup and UEFA Champions League) | 0 | — | | 46 | 0 |
| Benfica | 2004–05 | Primeira Liga | 15 | 0 | 3 | 0 | — | | 5 (Note: Appearances in UEFA Cup) | 0 | — | | 23 | 0 |
| Benfica | 2005–06 | Primeira Liga | 6 | 0 | 0 | 0 | — | | 2 (Note: Appearances in UEFA Champions League) | 0 | 1 (Note: Appearance in the 2005 Supertaça Cândido de Oliveira) | 0 | 9 | 0 |
| Benfica | 2006–07 | Primeira Liga | 1 | 0 | 0 | 0 | — | | 0 | 0 | — | | 1 | 0 |
| Benfica | 2007–08 | Primeira Liga | 0 | 0 | 0 | 0 | — | | 0 | 0 | — | | 0 | 0 |
| Benfica | 2008–09 | Primeira Liga | 14 | 0 | 2 | 0 | 0 | 0 | 1 | 0 | — | | 17 | 0 |
| Benfica | 2009–10 | Primeira Liga | 0 | 0 | 2 | 0 | 1 | 0 | 2 (Note: Appearances in UEFA Europa League) | 0 | — | | 5 | 0 |
| Benfica | 2010–11 | Primeira Liga | 2 | 0 | 0 | 0 | 4 | 0 | 0 | 0 | — | | 6 | 0 |
| Benfica | Total | | 112 | 0 | 10 | 0 | 5 | 0 | 20 | 0 | 1 | 0 | 148 | 0 |
| Swansea City | 2011–12 | Premier League | 0 | 0 | 0 | 0 | 1 | 0 | — | | — | | 1 | 0 |
| Omonia | 2012–13 | Cypriot First Division | 11 | 0 | 3 | 0 | — | | — | | — | | 14 | 0 |
| Omonia | 2013–14 | Cypriot First Division | 36 | 0 | 3 | 0 | — | | 2 | 0 | — | | 41 | 0 |
| Omonia | 2014–15 | Cypriot First Division | 15 | 0 | 0 | 0 | — | | 6 | 0 | — | | 21 | 0 |
| Omonia | Total | | 62 | 0 | 6 | 0 | — | | 8 | 0 | — | | 76 | 0 |
| Olhanense | 2015–16 | LigaPro | 40 | 0 | 0 | 0 | 0 | 0 | — | | — | | 40 | 0 |
| Estoril | 2016–17 | Primeira Liga | 28 | 0 | 0 | 0 | 0 | 0 | — | | — | | 28 | 0 |
| Estoril | 2017–18 | Primeira Liga | 17 | 0 | 0 | 0 | 1 | 0 | — | | — | | 18 | 0 |
| Estoril | Total | | 45 | 0 | 0 | 0 | 1 | 0 | — | | | | 46 | 0 |
| Cova Piedade | 2018–19 | LigaPro | 26 | 0 | 1 | 0 | 1 | 0 | — | | — | | 28 | 0 |
| Career total | | | 285 | 0 | 17 | 0 | 8 | 0 | 28 | 0 | 1 | 0 | 339 | 0 |

== Honours ==
Benfica

- Primeira Liga: 2004–05
- Taça de Portugal: 2003–04
- Supertaça Cândido de Oliveira: 2005
- Taça da Liga: 2009–10, 2010–11

Portugal

- UEFA European Championship runner-up: 2004

Portugal U21

- Toulon Tournament: 2001

Portugal U18

- UEFA European Under-18 Championship: 1999

Orders

- Medal of Merit, Order of the Immaculate Conception of Vila Viçosa (House of Braganza)
