= Afonso Assis =

Portuguese footballer

Personal information
- Full name: Afonso Assis Cunha Almeida
- Date of birth: 15 July 2006 (age 20)
- Place of birth: Guimarães, Portugal
- Height: 1.83 m (6 ft 0 in)
- Position: Midfielder

Team information
- Current team: Moreirense
- Number: 25

Youth career
- 2016–2019: SARC Salgueiral
- 2019–2025: Moreirense

Senior career*
Years	Team	Apps	(Gls)
2025–	Moreirense	19	(1)

International career
2025–	Portugal U20	2	(0)
- * Club domestic league appearances and goals as of 25 May 2026

Afonso Assis Cunha Almeida (born 15 July 2006) is a Portuguese professional footballer who plays as a midfielder for Primeira Liga club Moreirense.

== Club career ==
Assis is a product of the youth academies of SARC Salgueiral and Moreirense. On 2 January 2025, he signed his first professional contract with Moreirense until 2029. He made his senior and professional debut with Moreirense in a 3–1 Primeira Liga loss to Porto on 2 May 2025. He participated in Moreirense's pre-season in the summer of 2025, and promoted to the senior squad for the 2025–26 season.

== International career ==
Assis was first called up to the Portugal U20s for a set of friendlies in September 2025.

== Personal life ==
Afonso Assis the son of the former Portugal international footballer Nuno Assis.
