= Charalambos Kyriakou =

Cypriot footballer (born 1989)

Charis Kyriakou
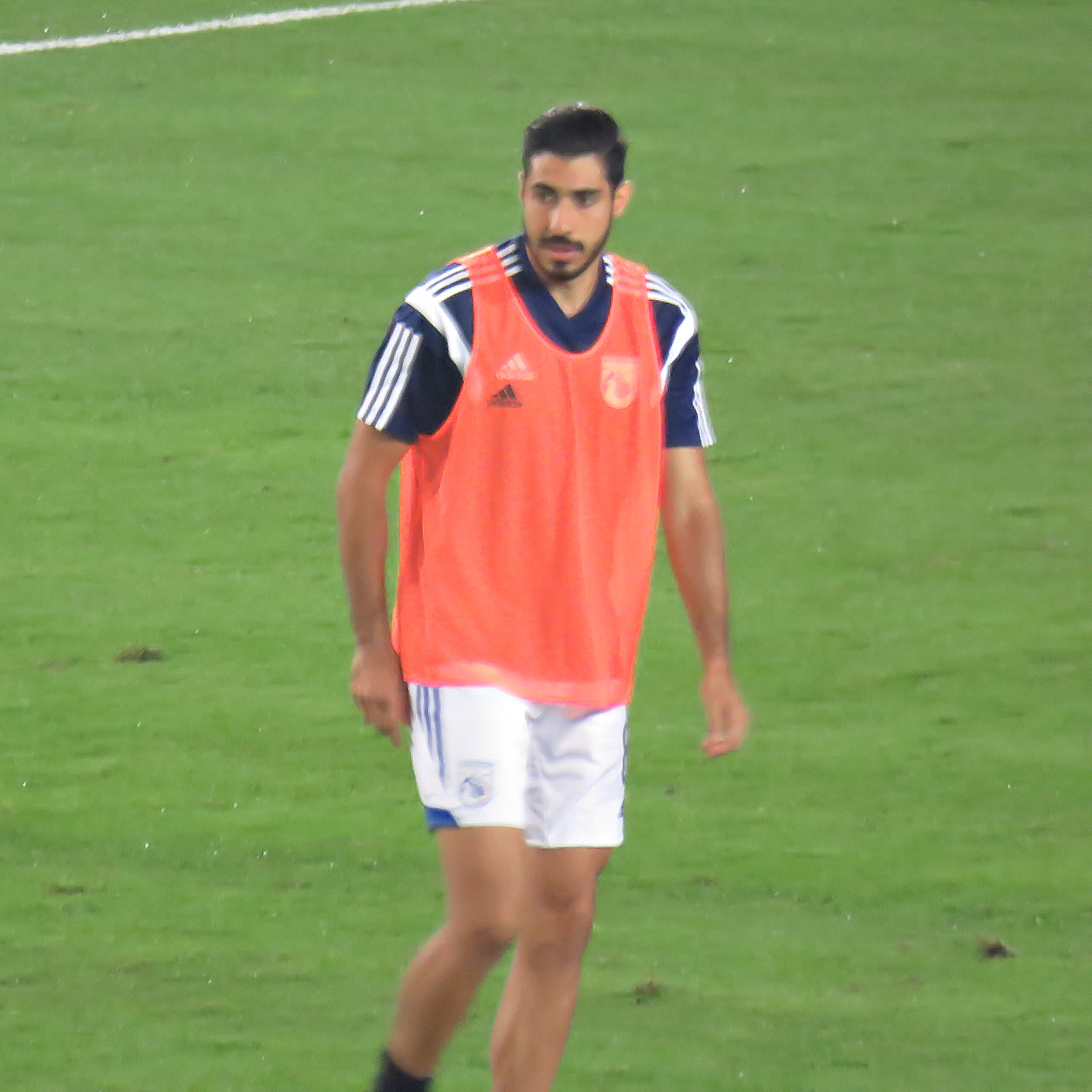
- Kyriakou warming up with Cyprus in 2015

Personal information
- Full name: Charalambos Kyriakou
- Date of birth: 15 October 1989 (age 37)
- Place of birth: Nicosia, Cyprus
- Height: 1.78 m (5 ft 10 in)
- Positions: Right back; centre-back

Team information
- Current team: Doxa Katokopias
- Number: 40

Youth career
- Omonia

Senior career*
Years	Team	Apps	(Gls)
2008–2015	Omonia	55	(0)
2011	→ Doxa Katokopias (loan)	8	(0)
2015–2016	Ethnikos Achna	33	(0)
2016–2021	AEL Limassol	70	(0)
2021–2022	Doxa Katokopias	15	(0)
2022–2023	East Bengal	18	(1)
2023–	Doxa Katokopias	22	(0)

International career^{‡}
2009	Cyprus U21	1	(0)
2013–	Cyprus	12	(0)
- * Club domestic league appearances and goals as of 21:49, 27 May 2024 (UTC) ‡ National team caps and goals as of 17 November 2020

Charalambos "Charis" Kyriakou (Greek: Χαράλαμπος "Χάρης" Κυριάκου; born 15 October 1989) is a Cypriot professional footballer who plays as a defender for Doxa Katokopias and the Cyprus national team.

== Club career ==
Kyriakou is a product of the youth academy of Omonia. After spending a short period on loan in Doxa Katokopias in 2011, he returned to Omonia. On 6 July 2014, he became the new captain of Omonia.

=== East Bengal ===
In August 2022, Kyriakou was announced as one of the five foreigners signed by East Bengal for the upcoming season.

On 25 August, he made his debut against Rajasthan United in the Durand Cup, which ended in a 0–0 stalemate.

=== Return to Cyprus ===
In October 2023, Kyriakou returned for a third spell with Doxa Katokopias.

== International career ==
In 2009, Kyriakou represented Cyprus at the under-21 level. On 8 June 2013, he made his first appearance for the Cyprus national team in a FIFA World Cup qualifying match against Switzerland.

== Career statistics ==
=== Club ===
As of 17 April 2023

Club	Season	League			Cup		Continental		Total	
Club	Season	Division	Apps	Goals	Apps	Goals	Apps	Goals	Apps	Goals
Omonia	2009–10	Cypriot First Division	1	0	0	0	—		1	0
Omonia	2011–12	Cypriot First Division	4	0	3 (Note: Appearance(s) in Cypriot Cup)	0	—		7	0
Omonia	2012–13	Cypriot First Division	11	0	2	0	—		13	0
Omonia	2013–14	Cypriot First Division	29	0	4	0	—		33	0
Omonia	2014–15	Cypriot First Division	10	0	3	0	5 (Note: Appearance(s) in UEFA Europa League)	0	18	0
Omonia	Omonia total		55	0	12	0	5	0	72	0
Doxa Katokopias (loan)	2010–11	Cypriot First Division	8	0	0	0	—		8	0
Ethnikos Achna	2015–16	Cypriot First Division	33	0	1	0	—		34	0
AEL Limassol	2016–17	Cypriot First Division	14	0	1	0	—		15	0
AEL Limassol	2017–18	Cypriot First Division	13	0	0	0	2	0	15	0
AEL Limassol	2018–19	Cypriot First Division	5	0	0	0	—		5	0
AEL Limassol	2019–20	Cypriot First Division	15	0	2	0	—		17	0
AEL Limassol	2020–21	Cypriot First Division	23	0	4	0	—		27	0
AEL Limassol	AEL Limassol total		70	0	7	0	2	0	79	0
Doxa Katokopias	2021–22	Cypriot First Division	15	0	3	1	—		18	1
East Bengal	2022–23	Indian Super League	18	1	6 (Note: Appearance(s) in Durand Cup) (Note: Appearance(s) in Super Cup)	0	—		24	1
Career total			199	1	29	1	7	0	235	2

=== International ===
As of matches played till 17 November 2020

National team	Year	Apps	Goals
Cyprus	2013	1	0
Cyprus	2014	6	0
Cyprus	2015	1	0
Cyprus	2020	4	0
Total		12	0

== Honours ==
AC Omonia

- Cypriot Championship: 2010
- Cypriot Cup: 2011, 2012
- Cyprus FA Shield: 2010, 2012
