= Roberto García (footballer, born 1980) =

Spanish footballer

Roberto
Personal information
- Full name: Roberto García Cabello
- Date of birth: 4 February 1980 (age 46)
- Place of birth: Madrid, Spain
- Height: 1.90 m (6 ft 3 in)
- Position: Centre-forward

Youth career
- Real Madrid

Senior career*
Years	Team	Apps	(Gls)
2000–2001	Real Madrid B	6	(0)
2001–2002	Alcorcón	32	(3)
2002	Sevilla B	2	(0)
2003	Mérida	15	(0)
2003–2004	Guijuelo		
2004–2005	Huesca	29	(10)
2005–2006	Burgos	36	(10)
2006–2009	Huesca	105	(41)
2009–2010	Gimnàstic	34	(4)
2010–2012	Huesca	73	(16)
2012–2014	Apollon Limassol	59	(10)
2014–2015	Omonia	25	(3)
2015–2017	Toledo	64	(10)
2017–2019	Alcobendas Sport	60	(19)
2019–2020	Trival Valderas	8	(2)
2020	Unión Adarve	5	(1)
Total		553	(129)
- * Club domestic league appearances and goals

Roberto García Cabello (born 4 February 1980), known simply as Roberto, is a Spanish former professional footballer who played as a centre-forward.

== Career ==
Born in Madrid, Roberto only made his debut in professional football in the 2008–09 season, aged 28, at the service of SD Huesca in the Segunda División. In the previous campaign, he had scored a career-best 20 goals (plus two in the playoffs and one in the Copa del Rey) to help the club promote from Segunda División B for the first time ever.

Roberto played his first game in the second division of Spanish football on 31 August 2008, and scored in a 2–2 home draw against CD Castellón. He went on to amass second-tier totals of 141 matches and 32 goals, for Huesca and Gimnàstic de Tarragona.

In 2012, at the age of 32, Roberto moved abroad for the first time, going on to spend several years in the Cypriot First Division.

== Career statistics ==
As of 15 May 2016

Club	Season	League			Cup		Continental		Total	
Club	Season	Division	Apps	Goals	Apps	Goals	Apps	Goals	Apps	Goals
Real Madrid B	2000–01	Segunda División B	6	0	—		—		6	0
Alcorcón	2001–02	Segunda División B	32	3	—		—		32	3
Sevilla B	2002–03	Segunda División B	2	0	—		—		2	0
Mérida	2002–03	Segunda División B	15	0	1	0	—		16	0
Huesca	2004–05	Segunda División B	29	10	—		—		29	10
Burgos	2005–06	Segunda División B	36	10	2	0	2 (Note: Appearances in Segunda División B play-offs)	0	40	10
Huesca	2006–07	Segunda División B	34	9	—		4	0	38	9
Huesca	2007–08	Segunda División B	37	20	2	1	4	2	43	23
Huesca	2008–09	Segunda División	34	12	1	0	—		35	12
Huesca	Total		105	41	3	1	8	2	116	44
Gimnàstic	2009–10	Segunda División	34	4	1	0	—		35	4
Huesca	2010–11	Segunda División	38	5	0	0	—		38	5
Huesca	2011–12	Segunda División	35	11	2	1	—		37	12
Huesca	Total		73	16	2	1	—		75	17
Apollon Limassol	2012–13	Cypriot First Division	28	6	7	1	—		35	7
Apollon Limassol	2013–14	Cypriot First Division	31	4	7	1	8 (Note: Appearances in UEFA Europa League)	0	46	5
Apollon Limassol	Total		59	10	14	2	8	0	81	12
Omonia	2014–15	Cypriot First Division	25	3	6	0	5	1	36	4
Toledo	2015–16	Segunda División B	33	8	—		—		33	8
Career total			449	105	29	4	23	3	501	112
