= Marco Soares (footballer) =

Footballer (born 1984)

Personal information
- Full name: Marco Paulo da Silva Soares
- Date of birth: 16 June 1984 (age 42)
- Place of birth: Setúbal, Portugal
- Height: 1.80 m (5 ft 11 in)
- Position: Defensive midfielder

Team information
- Current team: Florgrade

Youth career
- 1994–1995: GDR Portugal
- 1995–1996: Sporting CP
- 1996–1998: GDR Portugal
- 1998–2003: Barreirense

Senior career*
Years	Team	Apps	(Gls)
2003–2006	Barreirense	96	(8)
2006–2012	União Leiria	67	(3)
2006–2007	→ Olhanense (loan)	15	(2)
2008	→ Pandurii (loan)	1	(0)
2012–2013	Omonia	40	(4)
2014–2015	1º Agosto	6	(0)
2015–2018	AEL Limassol	100	(5)
2018–2019	Feirense	17	(0)
2019–2022	Arouca	49	(0)
2022–2024	Florgrade	35	(1)
Total		426	(23)

International career
2006–2021	Cape Verde	52	(3)
- * Club domestic league appearances and goals

Marco Paulo da Silva Soares (born 16 June 1984) is a former professional footballer who played as a defensive midfielder.

He spent most of his career in Portugal and Cyprus, making 60 Primeira Liga appearances for União de Leiria, Feirense and Arouca in the former and representing Omonia and AEL Limassol in the latter's First Division.

Soares earned 52 caps for Cape Verde from 2006, playing at the 2013 and 2021 Africa Cup of Nations.

== Club career ==
Born in Setúbal, Portugal, Soares started playing professionally with F.C. Barreirense, competing two seasons in the third division and one in the second. In 2006 he signed for U.D. Leiria, but only totalled two Primeira Liga appearances in his first two years, also serving two loans in the process, one of them in Romania with CS Pandurii Târgu Jiu.

Soares returned to Leiria for the 2008–09 campaign, helping União be promoted to the top flight after a one-year absence. Eventually, he would also become club captain.

On 31 October 2010, during a 1–2 home loss against Sporting CP – where he had played youth football – Soares fractured his left leg while attempting a shot, being sidelined for four months. After returning, he contributed 14 matches in 2011–12 as his team suffered relegation.

After a spell with AC Omonia in Cyprus, where he won the Super Cup in 2012, Soares signed a two-year deal with C.D. Primeiro de Agosto of the Angolan Girabola in November 2013. The team was managed by Daúto Faquirá, who had given him his debut at Barreirense.

In July 2015, Soares returned to the Eastern Mediterranean island to join AEL Limassol. As before, he won the Super Cup in his first summer at the club, this time beating APOEL FC in a penalty shootout.

Soares came back to Portugal after six years away in July 2018, signing a two-year contract for C.D. Feirense. In September the following year, after relegation from the top flight, he rescinded his link and moved to F.C. Arouca in the third tier. The 35-year-old extended his contract in May 2020, when a COVID-19-ended season resulted in promotion.

== International career ==
Soares opted to represent Cape Verde internationally. He made his debut on 27 May 2006 in a friendly against Portugal, playing the last five minutes of a 4–1 loss as a substitute for Emerson da Luz. On 2 June 2007, he scored his first goal in a 2–2 home draw with Algeria in 2008 Africa Cup of Nations qualification. He was a member of the squad in the 2010 FIFA World Cup qualification campaign, scoring to conclude a 3–1 win over Mauritius also in Praia.

On 24 May 2010, Soares appeared in a friendly in Covilhã against the country of his birth, who were preparing for the World Cup in South Africa, playing the entire match as the minnows (ranked 117th) managed a 0–0 draw. He was part of Cape Verde's first major tournament squad at the 2013 Africa Cup of Nations, where the Blue Sharks reached the quarter-finals, but was overlooked for the 2015 edition.

== Career statistics ==
=== Club ===
As of match played on 29 November 2015

Appearances and goals by club, season and competition
Club	Season	League			Cup		Continental		Total	
Club	Season	Division	Apps	Goals	Apps	Goals	Apps	Goals	Apps	Goals
Barreirense	2003–04	Segunda Divisão	32	2	2	0	—		34	2
Barreirense	2004–05	Segunda Divisão	34	4	0	0	—		34	4
Barreirense	2005–06	Liga de Honra	30	2	1	0	—		31	2
Barreirense	Total		96	8	3	0	—		99	8
União Leiria	2006–07	Primeira Liga	1	0	0	0	—		1	0
União Leiria	2007–08	Primeira Liga	1	0	1	0	2 (Note: Appearances in UEFA Cup)	0	4	0
União Leiria	2008–09	Segunda Liga	26	1	5	2	—		31	3
União Leiria	2009–10	Primeira Liga	17	2	4	0	—		21	2
União Leiria	2010–11	Primeira Liga	8	0	1	0	—		9	0
União Leiria	2011–12	Primeira Liga	14	0	0	0	—		14	0
União Leiria	Total		67	3	11	2	2	0	80	5
Olhanense (loan)	2006–07	Segunda Liga	15	2	1	0	—		16	2
Pandurii (loan)	2007–08	Liga I	1	0			—		1	0
Omonia	2012–13	Cypriot First Division	26	3	5	0	2 (Note: Appearances in UEFA Europa League)	0	33	3
Omonia	2013–14	Cypriot First Division	14	1	0	0	2	0	16	1
Omonia	Total		40	4	5	0	4	0	49	4
1º Agosto	2014	Girabola	2	0			—		2	0
1º Agosto	2015	Girabola	4	0			—		4	0
1º Agosto	Total		6	0			—		6	0
AEL Limassol	2015–16	Cypriot First Division	11	0	1	0	—		12	0
Career total			236	17	21	2	6	0	263	19

=== International ===
Scores and results list Cape Verde's goal tally first, score column indicates score after each Soares goal.

List of international goals scored by Marco Soares
No.	Date	Venue	Opponent	Score	Result	Competition
1	2 June 2007	Estádio da Várzea, Praia, Cape Verde	Algeria	1–1	2–2	2008 Africa Cup of Nations qualification
2	22 June 2008	Estádio da Várzea, Praia, Cape Verde	Mauritius	3–1	3–1	2010 FIFA World Cup qualification
3	2 June 2012	National Stadium, Freetown, Sierra Leone	Sierra Leone	1–2	1–2	2014 FIFA World Cup qualification

== Honours ==
Barreirense

- Segunda Divisão: 2004–05

Omonia

- Cypriot Super Cup: 2012

AEL Limassol

- Cypriot Super Cup: 2015
