= Evagoras Chatzifragkiskou =

Cypriot footballer (born 1986)

Personal information
- Full name: Evagoras Chatzifragkiskou
- Date of birth: October 29, 1986 (age 40)
- Place of birth: Nicosia, Cyprus
- Height: 1.85 m (6 ft 1 in)
- Position: Goalkeeper

Youth career
- APOEL

Senior career*
Years	Team	Apps	(Gls)
2005–2010	APOEL	0	(0)
2006–2007	→ Chalkanoras Idaliou (loan)	26	(0)
2007–2008	→ MEAP Nisou (loan)	17	(0)
2008–2009	→ Doxa Katokopias (loan)	9	(0)
2009–2010	→ Olympiakos Nicosia (loan)	5	(0)
2010–2013	Nea Salamina	10	(0)
2013–2014	Omonia	0	(0)
2014–2018	Doxa Katokopias	44	(0)
2018–2019	ASIL Lysi	24	(0)

International career^{‡}
2007–2009	Cyprus U21	2	(0)
- * Club domestic league appearances and goals as of 14:51, 29 May 2019 (UTC) ‡ National team caps and goals as of February 6, 2010

Evagoras Chatzifragkiskou (Greek: Ευαγόρας Χατζηφραγκίσκου; born 29 October 1986) is a Cypriot goalkeeper.
