= Fouad Idabdelhay =

Dutch footballer

Personal information
- Full name: Fouad Idabdelhay
- Date of birth: 2 May 1988 (age 38)
- Place of birth: Bergen op Zoom, Netherlands
- Height: 1.86 m (6 ft 1 in)
- Position: Forward

Youth career
- FC Bergen
- NAC

Senior career*
Years	Team	Apps	(Gls)
2007–2011	NAC	49	(8)
2009–2010	→ RKC (loan)	25	(3)
2011–2012	VfL Osnabrück	16	(6)
2013	Dordrecht	10	(3)
2013–2014	AEL Limassol	22	(5)
2014	Wydad Casablanca	0	(0)
2019-2022	Halsteren		
2022-2026	Kruisland		

International career
2008–2009	Netherlands U20	5	(0)
- * Club domestic league appearances and goals as of 19 March 2015

Fouad Idabdelhay (born 2 May 1988) is a Dutch retired footballer who played as an attacker.

== Club career ==
Born in Bergen op Zoom, North Brabant to Moroccan parents, Idabdelhay made his début in 2007/2008 against Stormvogels Telstar Reserves in the KNVB Cup. He replaced Matthew Amoah in the attack in the 78th minute. Three minutes later, he scored the winning goal for NAC.

A few days later, he made his Eredivisie debut against PSV. Short before the final whistle he replaced Viktor Sikora.

On 22 January 2008, Idabdelhay scored his first Eredivisie goal against AZ, before he was substituted 18 minutes before the final whistle. A few minutes later he scored the 1–1 for NAC. In the last minute he scored his second goal, and gave NAC the victory. A week later, against Roda JC, Idabdelhay was substituted in the 68th minute. In the same minute he was substituted, he scored the 2–0 goal, which was also the final result.

On 13 July 2011, Idabelhay signed a two-year contract with the German 3. Liga side VfL Osnabrück, but he was released six months later.

In February 2013, Idabdelhay signed with FC Dordrecht until the end of the season, scoring 7 goals. After leaving FC Dordrecht, Idabdelhay signed with AEL Limassol.

In August 2014, Idabdelhay signed a three-year contract with Wydad Casablanca. After only one game for Wydad Casablanca, Idabdelhay suffered a back injury. After not being paid by Wydad Idabdelhay was set to be loaned to Chabab Rif Al Hoceima, but the deal fell through, due to not being paid his owed salary by Wydad. Idabdelhay left Wydad after not being paid for three months.

He returned to the Netherlands to play for amateur side Halsteren halfway their 2018-19 season. In summer 2022 he moved to ambitious club SC Kruisland and he retired in summer 2026.

== International career ==
Idabdelhay played 5 games for the Netherlands national under-20 football team.
