= Alípio =

Brazilian footballer (born 1992)

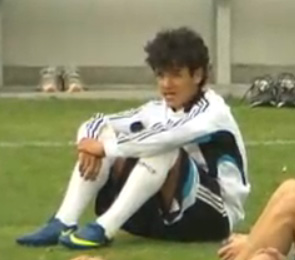
- Alípio in training with Real Madrid

Personal information
- Full name: Alípio Duarte Brandão
- Date of birth: 7 June 1992 (age 34)
- Place of birth: Brasília, Brazil
- Height: 1.74 m (5 ft 9 in)
- Position: Attacking midfielder

Youth career
- 2007: Escola Dois Toques
- 2007–2008: Rio Ave
- 2008–2010: Real Madrid
- 2010–2011: Benfica

Senior career*
Years	Team	Apps	(Gls)
2009	Real Madrid C	2	(0)
2009	Real Madrid B	2	(0)
2011–2013	Benfica	0	(0)
2011	→ América-RN (loan)	5	(0)
2012	→ Al Sharjah (loan)	0	(0)
2013–2014	Omonia	20	(3)
2014–2015	Apollon Smyrnis	4	(0)
2015–2016	Luverdense	29	(4)
2016–2021	Tombense	16	(4)
2016	→ Vitória (loan)	10	(0)
2017	→ Atlético Goianiense (loan)	7	(2)
2017	→ Vila Nova (loan)	34	(7)
2018	→ Fortaleza (loan)	12	(0)
2018	→ CRB (loan)	10	(0)
2019	→ Figueirense (loan)	20	(3)
2021	→ Uberlândia (loan)	12	(1)
- * Club domestic league appearances and goals as of 16 October 2021

Alípio Duarte Brandão (born 7 June 1992), known simply as Alípio, is a Brazilian footballer who plays as an attacking midfielder.

== Early years ==
Born in Brasília, Distrito Federal, Alípio left Brazil at the age of 14. An orphan, he moved to Portugal with his legal guardian Helber Damião, co-owner of the football school Dois Toques.

His first footballing rights were split between Damião, his original club in his homeland, Sport Club Internacional, and the team to where he moved, Rio Ave FC.

== Club career ==
In November 2008, Alípio joined Real Madrid for roughly €1.4 million, without having made one single first-team appearance with Rio Ave. He scored two goals on his debut for the C-team which operated in Tercera División, and played his second game against CF Rayo Majadahonda in a 2–0 home win, as they eventually finished in eighth position; he played most of his first two years, however, with the Juvenil side.

After scoring in a training match against the Real Madrid first team on 11 February 2009, Alípio made his official debut for Real Madrid Castilla four days later, against Águilas CF, as an 87th-minute substitute for Miguel Palanca. Thus, he became the youngest player ever to appear for the reserves; during the ten minutes he played, he impressed spectators and his coaches alike with his ball skills.

In the 2010–11 season, aged 18, Alípio returned to Portugal, being sold to S.L. Benfica and signing a five-year contract with the Primeira Liga club. In his first year in Lisbon he played for the under-19s but, late into it, was loaned to Série C team América Futebol Clube (RN).

Alípio returned to Benfica shortly after due to bureaucratic problems and was again loaned, now to Al-Sharjah SCC in the UAE Arabian Gulf League. After two years away from professional football he went on trial with AC Omonia, who later signed him to a permanent deal; he made his debut for his new club on 23 October, against Nikos & Sokratis Erimis for the campaign's Cypriot Cup. Three days later he first appeared in the First Division, coming from the bench to provide two assists in the 6–0 away routing of Doxa Katokopias FC.

== Personal life ==
Alípio idolized Ronaldo while he was growing up. His compatriot also played professionally for Real Madrid, winning the 2002 FIFA World Cup with Brazil.
