= Pantelis Konomis =

Cypriot footballer (born 1996)

Personal information
- Full name: Pantelis Konomis
- Date of birth: November 15, 1996 (age 30)
- Place of birth: Nicosia, Cyprus
- Height: 1.91 m (6 ft 3 in)
- Position: Centre-back

Team information
- Current team: Omonia 29M
- Number: 3

Youth career
- PAEEK FC

Senior career*
Years	Team	Apps	(Gls)
2013–2014	Alki Larnaca	10	(0)
2014–2017	Omonia	0	(0)
2015–2017	→ Omonia Aradippou (loan)	44	(0)
2021–	Omonia 29M	109	(7)
- * Club domestic league appearances and goals as of 3 May 2026

Pantelis Konomis (Greek: Παντελής Κονόμης; born 15 November 1996) is a Cypriot former footballer who played as a centre back for PAC Omonia. He could also play as a defensive midfielder.

== Club career ==
Konomis started his playing career from PAEEK FC academies. The summer of 2013 he transferred to Alki Larnaca to play for the first time in the Cypriot First Division. On 4 July 2014 he joined Omonia making the big step in his career.
