= Agostinho Oliveira =

Portuguese footballer and coach

Personal information
- Full name: Agostinho Vieira de Oliveira
- Date of birth: 5 February 1947 (age 79)
- Place of birth: Póvoa de Lanhoso, Portugal
- Position: Defender

Youth career
- 1962–1966: Braga

Senior career*
Years	Team	Apps	(Gls)
1966–1968	Braga	21	(0)
1968–1969	Académica	6	(0)
1969–1975	Braga		
1979–1982	Minas da Borralha		
1982–1986	Arco de Baúlhe		

Managerial career
- 1983–1985: Braga (assistant)
- 2000–2002: Portugal U21
- 2002: Portugal
- 2004–2006: Portugal U21
- 2008–2010: Portugal (assistant)
- * Club domestic league appearances and goals

Agostinho Vieira de Oliveira (born 5 February 1947) is a Portuguese retired footballer who played as a defender, and a coach.

He had a brief manager stint with Portugal in 2002, and also worked a few years as an assistant with the national team, under Carlos Queiroz.

== Football career ==
Oliveira was born in Póvoa de Lanhoso, Braga District. During his nine-year professional career, he appeared almost exclusively for local S.C. Braga. His first managerial job was in 1983, as he acted as assistant coach of his main club for two seasons.

Oliveira replaced António Oliveira as the Portugal national team manager, in a temporary role before Luiz Felipe Scolari took over in 2002. He was in charge for four games, winning two (against Sweden (3–2) and Scotland (2–0)) and drawing two (England and Tunisia, both 1–1).

Among others, Oliveira started Paulo Ferreira and Jorge Ribeiro's international careers. He was also coach of the under-21 and Olympic sides, leading the latter to the 2004 Summer Olympics tournament which ended in group stage exit.

In 2008, as Carlos Queiroz returned to the national team, Oliveira was named assistant manager. In September 2010, after the head coach received a six-month suspension from the National Doping Agency following a run-in at the 2010 FIFA World Cup in South Africa, he sat on the bench for the start of the UEFA Euro 2012 qualifying campaign; after Queiroz was fired following the 0–1 loss in Norway, he was also relieved of his duties.

In December 2010, Oliveira returned to Braga as chief coordinator of the club's youth system.
