= Nuno Assis =

Portuguese footballer (born 1977)

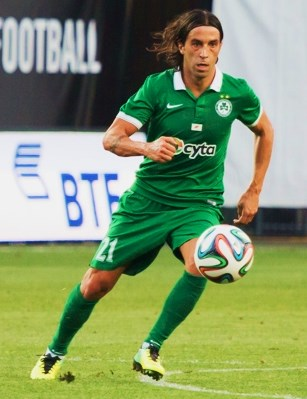
- Assis with Omonia in 2014

Personal information
- Full name: Nuno Assis Lopes de Almeida
- Date of birth: 25 November 1977 (age 48)
- Place of birth: Lousã, Portugal
- Height: 1.68 m (5 ft 6 in)
- Position: Attacking midfielder

Youth career
- 1992–1996: Sporting CP

Senior career*
| Years | Team | Apps | (Gls) |
| 1996–2001 | Sporting CP | 0 | (0) |
| 1996–1999 | → Lourinhanense (loan) | 59 | (23) |
| 1999–2000 | → Alverca (loan) | 19 | (0) |
| 2000–2001 | → Gil Vicente (loan) | 26 | (2) |
| 2001–2004 | Vitória Guimarães | 107 | (11) |
| 2005–2008 | Benfica | 56 | (4) |
| 2008–2010 | Vitória Guimarães | 49 | (12) |
| 2010–2011 | Al-Ittihad | 25 | (3) |
| 2011–2012 | Vitória Guimarães | 25 | (4) |
| 2012–2016 | Omonia | 110 | (21) |
| Total | | 476 | (80) |

International career
| 1998 | Portugal U21 | 1 | (0) |
| 2002–2003 | Portugal B | 3 | (2) |
| 2002–2009 | Portugal | 2 | (0) |
- * Club domestic league appearances and goals

Nuno Assis Lopes de Almeida (born 25 November 1977) is a Portuguese former professional footballer who played as an attacking midfielder.

He amassed Primeira Liga totals of 282 matches and 33 goals over 12 seasons, representing in the competition Alverca, Gil Vicente, Vitória de Guimarães (three spells) and Benfica. He also spent four years in the Cypriot First Division with Omonia.

Assis was handed a one-year suspension for doping in 2007. He made two appearances for the Portugal national team in the same decade.

== Club career ==
Born in Lousã, Coimbra District, Assis started playing football in his hometown before being spotted by Sporting CP; he then moved to the Lisbon club's youth system, being later loaned to S.C. Lourinhanense who acted as the farm team. He made his debut in the Primeira Liga in 1999–2000 with Alverca while still owned by Sporting, and was subsequently loaned a final time the following season to Gil Vicente, for whom he scored his first top-flight goals.

Assis was released by Sporting in summer 2001, signing with Vitória de Guimarães. In his second year he scored three goals from 33 appearances, netting four in 31 in the following campaign. He started off 2004–05 with the Minho side, but moved to S.L. Benfica in the next winter transfer window to replace the ageing Zlatko Zahovič; he scored on his debut, a 2–1 away win against Moreirense.

Prior to 2008–09's kick-off, having been relatively used over the course of three and a half seasons, Assis left Benfica alongside Luís Filipe, re-joining Vitória Guimarães. He scored his first career hat-trick on 30 January 2009, in a 4–2 away victory over Vitória de Setúbal.

Assis continue to feature prominently in the 2009–10 season, scoring five goals in 26 games as the team finished sixth. In June 2010, the 32-year-old joined Saudi Pro League team Al-Ittihad for his first abroad experience; in his first appearance, on 14 August, he helped to a 2–1 home defeat of Al-Ettifaq.

In late August 2011, Assis returned to Vitória Guimarães. In the following summer, he moved clubs and countries again after agreeing to a deal at Omonia. He scored twice in 28 Cypriot First Division matches in his debut campaign, but had the intention to leave after his contract expired due to financial differences, eventually changing his mind and also becoming captain.

=== Doping case ===
After Benfica beat Marítimo 1–0 on 3 December 2005, Assis was alleged to have tested positive for a banned substance. In February 2006, the test results were announced and UEFA's Control and Disciplinary Body suspended the player from all official UEFA matches; the result of the game was not contested. On 7 May, the former's president Luís Filipe Vieira alleged that the tests were conducted improperly, as a 72-hour delay between collection and testing may have led to sample degradation and potential false positives.

On 14 July 2006, the Justice Council of the Portuguese Football Federation threw out the sentence on technicalities and reversed Assis' six-month ban, specifically noting the disregard for his defence. Benfica threatened to press charges, and asked for the resignation of the laboratory director and the technicians involved in this case. On the 19th, the president of the LAD anti-doping laboratory Luís Horta was quoted in Portuguese sports newspapers O Jogo and A Bola, claiming that the player had tested positive for the steroid 19-norandrosterona; according to statement, sample A contained 4.5 ng/ml and the counter-sample 4.0 ng/ml, while the legal limit was 2.0.

Vieira responded on 15 July, accusing Horta and Luís Sardinha (president of the National Anti-Doping Council, CNAD) of fabricating data and lying to protect themselves. He revealed that the agenda of CNAD's meeting in which they chose to prosecute Assis disregarded the technical analysis proposing that charges should be dropped. The World Anti-Doping Agency stepped in and requested a two-year ban, but after an appeal to the Court of Arbitration for Sport, the original six-month sentence was increased to one year.

== International career ==
Assis' first full cap for Portugal was won under coach Agostinho Oliveira on 20 November 2002, in a friendly. He came on as a substitute in the 2–0 win over Scotland.

Assis returned to the national team after more than six years of absence, taking the pitch during the second half of the decisive 2010 FIFA World Cup qualifier against Malta (4–0, in Guimarães). He was not picked, however, for the final stages in South Africa.

== Personal life ==
Assis' son, Afonso, is also a professional footballer.

== Career statistics ==
Appearances and goals by club, season and competition
| Club | Season | League | | | Cup | | Continental | | Total | |
| Club | Season | Division | Apps | Goals | Apps | Goals | Apps | Goals | Apps | Goals |
|---|---|---|---|---|---|---|---|---|---|---|
| Lourinhanense | 1997–98 | Segunda Divisão B | 28 | 12 | | | — | | 28 | 12 |
| Lourinhanense | 1998–99 | Segunda Divisão B | 31 | 11 | | | — | | 31 | 11 |
| Lourinhanense | Total | | 59 | 23 | | | — | | 53 | 23 |
| Alverca | 1999–2000 | Primeira Liga | 19 | 0 | 0 | 0 | — | | 19 | 0 |
| Gil Vicente | 2000–01 | Primeira Liga | 26 | 2 | 1 | 1 | — | | 27 | 3 |
| Vitória Guimarães | 2001–02 | Primeira Liga | 31 | 2 | 2 | 0 | — | | 33 | 2 |
| Vitória Guimarães | 2002–03 | Primeira Liga | 32 | 3 | 3 | 0 | — | | 35 | 3 |
| Vitória Guimarães | 2003–04 | Primeira Liga | 31 | 4 | 2 | 0 | — | | 33 | 4 |
| Vitória Guimarães | 2004–05 | Primeira Liga | 13 | 2 | 2 | 2 | — | | 15 | 4 |
| Vitória Guimarães | Total | | 107 | 11 | 9 | 2 | — | | 116 | 13 |
| Benfica | 2004–05 | Primeira Liga | 15 | 2 | 2 | 1 | 2 (Note: Appearances in UEFA Cup) | 0 | 19 | 3 |
| Benfica | 2005–06 | Primeira Liga | 10 | 0 | 0 | 0 | 2 (Note: Appearances in UEFA Champions League) | 0 | 12 | 0 |
| Benfica | 2006–07 | Primeira Liga | 14 | 1 | 0 | 0 | 7 | 0 | 21 | 1 |
| Benfica | 2007–08 | Primeira Liga | 17 | 1 | 6 | 1 | 5 | 0 | 28 | 2 |
| Benfica | Total | | 56 | 4 | 8 | 2 | 16 | 0 | 80 | 6 |
| Vitória Guimarães | 2008–09 | Primeira Liga | 23 | 7 | 6 | 0 | — | | 29 | 7 |
| Vitória Guimarães | 2009–10 | Primeira Liga | 26 | 5 | 7 | 1 | — | | 33 | 6 |
| Vitória Guimarães | Total | | 49 | 12 | 13 | 1 | — | | 62 | 13 |
| Al-Ittihad | 2010–11 | Saudi Pro League | 25 | 3 | 2 | 0 | 7 (Note: Appearances in AFC Champions League) | 3 | 34 | 6 |
| Vitória Guimarães | 2011–12 | Primeira Liga | 25 | 4 | 2 | 0 | — | | 27 | 4 |
| Omonia | 2012–13 | Cypriot First Division | 28 | 2 | 6 | 1 | 2 (Note: Appearances in UEFA Europa League) | 0 | 36 | 3 |
| Omonia | 2013–14 | First Division | 28 | 3 | 3 | 0 | 2 | 0 | 33 | 3 |
| Omonia | 2014–15 | First Division | 26 | 6 | 3 | 0 | 5 | 1 | 34 | 7 |
| Omonia | 2015–16 | First Division | 28 | 10 | 5 | 1 | 4 | 0 | 37 | 11 |
| Omonia | Total | | 110 | 21 | 17 | 2 | 13 | 1 | 140 | 24 |
| Career total | | | 436 | 66 | 43 | 7 | 32 | 4 | 521 | 80 |

== Honours ==
Benfica

- Primeira Liga: 2004–05
- Supertaça Cândido de Oliveira: 2005
- Taça de Portugal runner-up: 2004–05

Omonia

- Cypriot Super Cup: 2012
- Cypriot Cup runner-up: 2015–16

Individual

- Cypriot First Division Team of the Season: 2015–16

== See also ==
- List of doping cases in sport
