= Anthony Scaramozzino =

French professional football defender (born 1985)

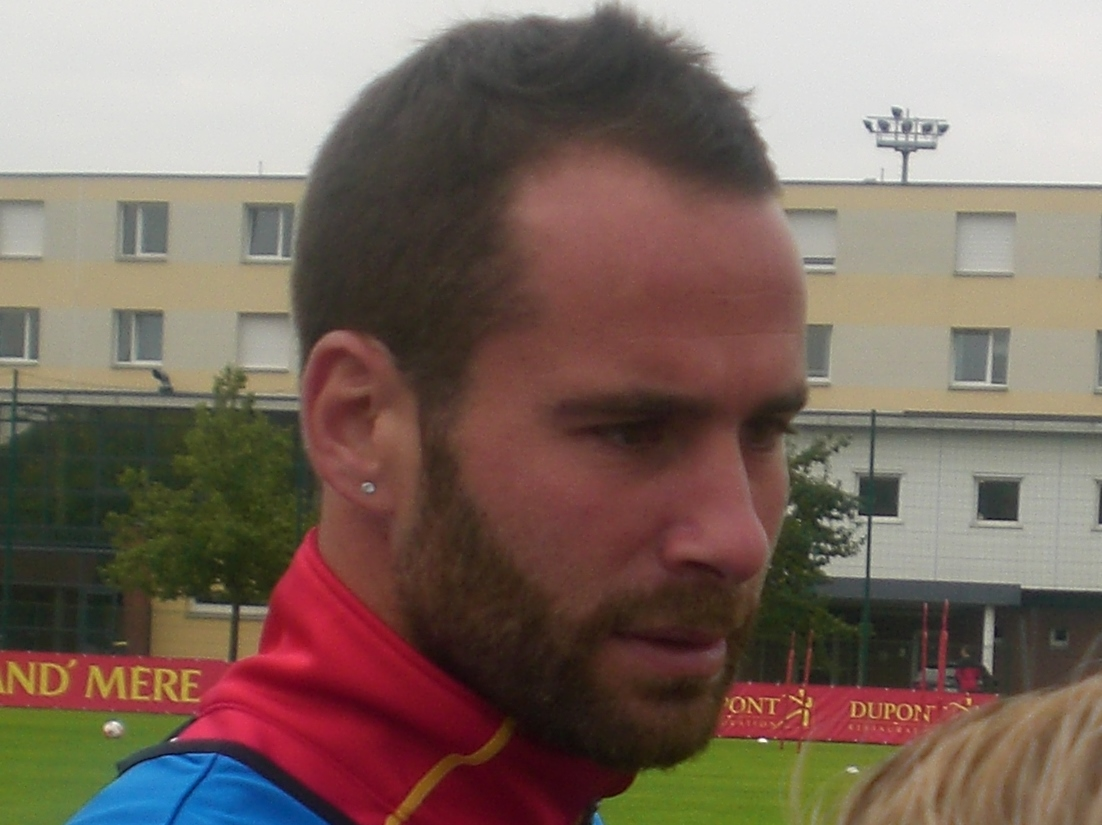
- Scaramozzino in 2015

Personal information
- Date of birth: 30 April 1985 (age 41)
- Place of birth: Nice, France
- Height: 1.80 m (5 ft 11 in)
- Positions: Left-back; centre-back

Team information
- Current team: Thonon Evian
- Number: 6

Youth career
- USONAC
- Cavigal Nice
- Nice

Senior career*
Years	Team	Apps	(Gls)
2003–2008	Nice	6	(0)
2005	→ Lorient (loan)	7	(0)
2005	→ Gillingham (loan)	0	(0)
2006–2007	→ Cannes (loan)	24	(0)
2008–2010	Sedan	52	(1)
2010–2012	Châteauroux	46	(0)
2012–2015	Omonia	68	(1)
2015	→ Panetolikos (loan)	8	(0)
2015–2017	Lens	33	(1)
2017–2019	Laval	42	(2)
2019–2020	Boulogne	22	(5)
2020–2021	Pau FC	22	(0)
2021–2022	Bourg-en-Bresse	22	(0)
2022–	Thonon Evian	34	(4)
- * Club domestic league appearances and goals as of 20:05, 28 December 2022 (UTC)

Anthony Scaramozzino (born 30 April 1985) is a French professional footballer who plays as a defender for Thonon Evian.

Between 2003 and 2008, he played for Nice and also had loan spells with FC Lorient, Gillingham and AS Cannes.

== Career ==
Ahead of the 2019–20 season, Scaramozzino signed a two-year contract with US Boulogne.

On 23 June 2021, he joined Bourg-en-Bresse.

== Honours ==
AC Omonia

- Cyprus FA Shield: 2012
