= Álex Rubio (footballer, born 1993) =

Spanish footballer

Personal information
- Full name: Alejandro Rubio Brito
- Date of birth: 23 July 1993 (age 33)
- Place of birth: San Fernando, Spain
- Height: 1.85 m (6 ft 1 in)
- Positions: Forward; winger

Team information
- Current team: Tomares
- Number: 9

Youth career
- Sevilla

Senior career*
Years	Team	Apps	(Gls)
2012–2014	Sevilla B	53	(12)
2012	Sevilla	2	(0)
2014–2015	Omonia	33	(4)
2015	Alcoyano	14	(4)
2016	UCAM Murcia	10	(2)
2016–2017	Linense	25	(5)
2017–2018	Badajoz	34	(7)
2018	Cacereño	16	(2)
2019	Linares	20	(4)
2019–2020	Rociera	77	(32)
2022–2023	Bollullos	26	(4)
2023	Dos Hermanas	1	(0)
2024	Bollullos	22	(1)
2024–	Tomares	36	(3)

International career
2012–2013	Spain U20	5	(0)
- * Club domestic league appearances and goals as of 1 February 2026

Alejandro 'Álex' Rubio Brito (born 23 July 1993) is a Spanish footballer who plays for Tomares as a forward or a winger.

== Club career ==
Born in San Fernando, Cádiz, Rubio played youth football with native Andalusia giants Sevilla FC. In February 2012, still a junior, he began appearing professionally with the B-team in Segunda División B.

Rubio made his official debut with the main squad on 2 September 2012, playing 15 minutes in a 0–0 La Liga away draw against Rayo Vallecano. On 30 January 2014, after another spell with the reserves, he moved abroad and joined Cypriot First Division club AC Omonia.

On 30 July 2015, Rubio returned to Spain, signing for CD Alcoyano in the third division.
