= Ioannis Chatzivasilis =

Cypriot footballer (born 1990)

Personal information
- Full name: Ioannis Chatzivasilis
- Date of birth: 26 April 1990 (age 36)
- Place of birth: Paphos, Cyprus
- Height: 1.85 m (6 ft 1 in)
- Position: Forward

Team information
- Current team: Akritas Chlorakas
- Number: 26

Youth career
- AEP Paphos

Senior career*
| Years | Team | Apps | (Gls) |
| 2008–2009 | AEP Paphos | 2 | (0) |
| 2009–2011 | Atromitos Yeroskipou | 39 | (17) |
| 2011–2014 | Omonia | 2 | (1) |
| 2012–2013 | → Aris Limassol (loan) | 24 | (6) |
| 2014–2017 | Ethnikos Achna | 85 | (13) |
| 2017–2018 | Apollon Limassol | 5 | (0) |
| 2018–2019 | Doxa Katokopias | 28 | (4) |
| 2019–2020 | Anorthosis | 0 | (0) |
| 2020–2023 | Karmiotissa | 50 | (7) |
| 2023–2024 | AEZ Zakakiou | 42 | (9) |
| 2024– | Akritas Chlorakas | 55 | (21) |

International career^{‡}
| 2011–2012 | Cyprus U21 | 3 | (0) |
- * Club domestic league appearances and goals as of 14 June 2026 ‡ National team caps and goals as of 29 February 2012

Ioannis Chatzivasilis (Greek: Ιωάννης Χατζηβασίλης; born 26 April, 1990) is a Cypriot Football player. He currently plays for Akritas Chlorakas in the Cypriot First Division as a forward and second striker. He is known for his dribbling skills.

== Honors ==
- Cypriot Cup: 2012
- Cypriot Second Division: 2012-13
