= Dimitris Moulazimis =

Cypriot footballer (born 1992)

Personal information
- Date of birth: 15 January 1992 (age 34)
- Place of birth: Paralimni, Cyprus
- Height: 1.84 m (6 ft 0 in)
- Position: Right back

Team information
- Current team: Achyronas-Onisilos
- Number: 55

Youth career
- 2010–2011: Ascoli

Senior career*
Years	Team	Apps	(Gls)
2011	Enosis Neon Paralimni	4	(0)
2011–2012	Ermis Aradippou	15	(0)
2012–2013	Enosis Neon Paralimni	24	(0)
2013–2016	Omonia	0	(0)
2013–2014	→ Enosis Neon Paralimni (loan)	15	(0)
2015–2016	→ Ermis Aradippou (loan)	20	(0)
2016–2018	Ethnikos Achna	14	(0)
2018	Olympia Prague	14	(1)
2018–2021	Enosis Neon Paralimni	40	(0)
2021–2022	Pafos	0	(0)
2022–2025	AO Ayia Napa	75	(1)
2025–	Achyronas-Onisilos	26	(0)

International career^{‡}
2010–2012	Cyprus U-19	5	(0)
2012–2014	Cyprus U-21	10	(0)
- * Club domestic league appearances and goals as of 3 May 2026 ‡ National team caps and goals as of 29 February 2014

Dimitris Moulazimis (Greek: Δημήτρης Μουλαζίμης; born 15 January 1992) is a Cypriot right back football player who plays for Achyronas-Onisilos.

== Career ==
He played in Cyprus U-21 national team.
