= Onisiforos Rousias =

Cypriot footballer

Personal information
- Full name: Onisiforos Rousias
- Date of birth: 15 July 1992 (age 34)
- Place of birth: Paralimni, Cyprus
- Height: 1.88 m (6 ft 2 in)
- Position: Forward

Team information
- Current team: Ayia Napa
- Number: 8

Youth career
- 2002–2008: Enosis Neon Paralimni
- 2009–2011: Middlesbrough

Senior career*
Years	Team	Apps	(Gls)
2011–2013	Enosis Neon Paralimni	23	(2)
2013–2017	Omonia	61	(6)
2017–2019	AEK Larnaca	27	(0)
2019–2020	Enosis Neon Paralimni	18	(1)
2020–2021	Ermis Aradippou	37	(17)
2021–2022	Anorthosis	16	(0)
2022–2023	Enosis Neon Paralimni	33	(4)
2023–2024	Ypsonas Krasava	25	(4)
2024–	Ayia Napa	50	(7)

International career^{‡}
2009–2010	Cyprus U19	6	(1)
2011–2014	Cyprus U21	9	(1)
2014–2021	Cyprus	9	(0)
- * Club domestic league appearances and goals as of 3 May 2026 ‡ National team caps and goals as of 10:29, 11 November 2024 (UTC)

Onisiforos Rousias (Greek: Ονησίφορος Ρουσιάς; born 15 July 1992) is a Cypriot professional footballer who plays as a striker for Cypriot Second Division club Ayia Napa.

== Club career ==
=== Enosis Neon Paralimni ===
Born in Paralimni, he began playing football with other children his age for Enosis Neon Paralimni Academy. He was the best goal-scorer for Cyprus National Under 17 league, scoring 26 goals and winning the League with EN Paralimni U-17 team.

=== Middlesbrough ===
Rousias skills and achievements caused English side Middlesbrough to sign him on 1 January 2009. Rousias stayed there for 2.5 years making appearances for Middlesbrough Reserves and Middlesbrough Under 18 team. At Middlesbrough, he improved his skills and prepared ready for a career in a Cypriot First Division team.

=== Return to Enosis Neon Paralimni ===
On 31 July 2011, Rousias returned to Cyprus for a transfer to Enosis Neon Paralimni. This time he was ready to take more chances, and prove that he was able to play for Enosis. Having 18 appearances and scoring two goals in 2011–2012 season, Rousias showed that he could be considered one of the great talents on the island. In the 2012–2013 season, Rousias was apparently sidelined by Enosis manager Ton Caanen, having only eight appearances (seven as a substitution), something that made him to ask for a free transfer. So Rousias left EN Paralimni on 28 December 2012.

=== Omonia Nicosia ===
Just a few days after Rousias left Enosis Neon Paralimni, Omonia showed their interest in him. On 1 January 2013, Rousias signed a 2.5 years contract with Omonia. He had 74 appearances with the club and scored 17 goals. On 26 May 2017, the club announced that with end of the season the player is released.

=== Anorthosis Famagusta ===
On 16 June 2021, Rousias signed a two-year contract until 2023 with Cypriot First Division club Anorthosis Famagusta.

== International career ==
Rousias represented Cyprus at youth level. In May 2014, he made his first appearance for the Cyprus first team squad against Japan.

== Career statistics ==
=== Club ===
As of match played 13 June 2022

Club	Season	League			Cypriot Cup		Europe		Other		Total	
Club	Season	Division	Apps	Goals	Apps	Goals	Apps	Goals	Apps	Goals	Apps	Goals
Enosis Neon Paralimni	2011–12	Cypriot First Division	16	2	0	0	—		—		16	2
Enosis Neon Paralimni	2012–13	Cypriot First Division	7	0	0	0	—		—		7	0
Enosis Neon Paralimni	Total		23	2	0	0	—		—		23	2
Omonia	2012–13	Cypriot First Division	1	0	—		—		—		1	0
Omonia	2013–14	Cypriot First Division	12	2	2	0	—		—		14	2
Omonia	2014–15	Cypriot First Division	13	1	4	3	1	0	—		18	4
Omonia	2015–16	Cypriot First Division	22	3	2	2	2	0	—		26	5
Omonia	2016–17	Cypriot First Division	13	0	1	0	2	3	—		16	3
Omonia	Total		61	6	9	5	5	3	—		75	14
AEK Larnaca	2017–18	Cypriot First Division	16	0	4	5	3	0	—		23	5
AEK Larnaca	2018–19	Cypriot First Division	11	0	1	0	1	0	1 (Note: Appearance in Cypriot Super Cup)	1	14	1
AEK Larnaca	Total		27	0	5	5	4	0	1	1	37	6
Enosis Neon Paralimni	2019–20	Cypriot First Division	18	1	1	1	—		—		19	2
Ermis Aradippou	2020–21	Cypriot First Division	37	17	1	0	—		—		38	17
Anorthosis	2021–22	Cypriot First Division	16	0	2	0	5	1	1	0	24	1
Career Total			182	26	18	11	14	4	2	1	216	42

== Honours ==
AEK Larnaca

- Cypriot Cup: 2017–18
- Cypriot Super Cup: 2018
