= 2011–12 Anorthosis Famagusta FC season =

Anorthosis Famagusta
2011–12 season
- Chairman: (Cyprus) Savvas Kakos
- Manager: (Israel) Ronny Levy (Romania) Gabriel Caramarin
- Stadium: Andonis Papadopolous
- Cypriot First Division: 4th
- Cypriot Cup: Quarter-finals, eliminated
- Europa League: Third qualifying round, eliminated
- Top goalscorer: League: 6 Goals: Rezek; All: 10 Goals: Rezek
Home colours	Away colours	Third colours

The 2011–12 season was the 101st season in Anorthosis Famagusta FC history and their 63rd consecutive season in Cypriot First Division, the top division of Cyprus football. It covered a period from 1 July 2011 to 30 May 2012.

Anorthosis Famagusta began the season in the second qualifying round of the Europa League. Anorthosis facedGagra Georgia, the Georgian Cup winner for the 2010-2011 season, in their first match. Anorthosis Famagusta defeated the Georgian club 3–0 in Andonis Papadopoulos stadium, with MVP Jan Rezek. Anorthosis Famagusta was then defeated 2–0 at the opposing team's home stadium of Gagra. In the third qualifying round, Anorthosis encountered FK Rabotnički Skopje. The first match in Antonis Papadopoulos Stadium was scoreless for the first 70 minutes. FK Rabotnički eventually won the game 2-0. In the second match at the Philip II Arena, Anorthosis defeated FK Rabotnički 1–2 with goals from Jan Rezek and Cristovão Ramos. Rabotnički scored at the end of the second half bringing the score at 2–0 and pushing the game into extra time. After the match against FK Rabotnički, Dimitar Ivankov was released from Anorthosis, as he was originally hired to help the team advance UEFA Europa League. After 9 weeks, an unannounced inspection conducted on groups that participated in the Europa League found that all the members of FK Rabotnički were doping.

== Season overview ==
=== August ===
Before the official start of Cypriot First Division, Anorthosis announced the acquisition of the Polish national goalkeeper Adam Stachowiak on August 10 and on August 27, only one day remaining before the first game of the season, the club announced the acquisition of Cyprus's national team's top scorer of all time, Michalis Constantinou.

On August 28, Anorthosis Famagusta opened their competitive season with a 0–1 win at the Dasaki Stadium in the first match of the Cypriot First Division against Ethnikos Achna. Jan Rezek scored after 78 minutes following an assist from Evandro Roncatto.

=== September ===
Anorthosis' first division home match resulted in a 1–1 draw over local rivals Nea Salamina on September 11. Julian Gray scored his first goal in the division at the 1st minute of extra time with a right-footed shot. Marquinhos scored the final goal against goalkeeper Dejan Milić to make it a tie game.

On the third match day, September 17, Anorthosis went to Tasos Markou to play against Enosis Paralimni. Anorthosis scored in the 69th minute with a goal by Bojan Markovski. Kostas Kiassos received a red card and Anorthosis ultimately lost the match.

The first classic derby of the season was on the fourth match day. Anorthosis Famagusta welcomed Omonia Nicosia at the Antonis Papadopoulos on September 25. Jan Rezek, Okkas, and Roncatto all attempted to score, but Antonis Georgallides blocked their shots. Freddy scored his fifth goal in the league with an assist from Constantinos Makrides. The match ended with a 0-1 loss for Anorthosis.

=== October ===
Anorthosis Famagusta defeated Alki Larnaca away 3–1 on October 2. Michalis Konstantinou scored his first two official goals in first Division, and Okkas scored his first season goal for Anorthosis Famagusta. Alki's goal was scored in the second half with the goal by Arnal Llibert after a pass by Dragoş Firţulescu.

On match day six, October 17, Anorthosis Famagusta faced Aris Limassol at the Antonis Papadopoulos. Jan Rezek scored two goals, and Aris received a point with an own goal by Jürgen Colin. Silvio González scored a goal at 60th minute, bringing the score to 2-2. Also in the 60th minute, Ventsislav Vasilev received a yellow card after a hard tackle on Vincent Laban.

October 23, match day seven, was the second derby for Anorthosis. They wet to Tsirion Stadium to play against AEL Limassol. The game ended 0-0. The shape of Levi showed his intentions, as the lift began with an aggressive 4-3-3, with their aggressive spikes Okka, Constantine and Rezek, while Pambos Christodoulou chose the common practice with two lines of defense and 4-5-1. The game finished 0-0. Matus Kozacik of Anorthosis was the man of the match.

Anorthosis Famagusta took part in its third derby of the season on October 28. The game was played against Apoel Nicosia, at GSP Stadium and ended up in another 0-0 draw. This marked Anorthosis' second consecutive scoreless match. The first half started with high intensity as both teams hit the crossbar with attempts from Apoel's Ailton, and from Ricardo Laborde of Anorthosis. The captain of Anthrosis, Ioannis Okkas, missed an important chance for scoring in the 29th minute of the match while Aíltion's shot was blocked by goalkeeper Matus Kozacik.

In the second half of the match, the team of Apoel controlled the ball under the coaching of manager Ivan Jovanovic who kept on making a number of attempts mostly during set pieces. Kozáčik made an important save just ten minutes before the end of the match when Savvas Poursaitidis was getting ready to shoot the ball into the empty goal post.

=== November ===
Anorthosis Famagusta defeated Ermis Aradippou 1–0 in Andonis Papadopoulos on November 7. They defeated Anagennisi Dherynia away 2–0 on November 19. Anorthosis went on to beat Renaissance 2-0 due to goals from Ioannis Okkas in the 40th and 69th minutes in the Ricardo Laborde.

On 23 November 2011 D. Ellinas group signed a contract with Anorthosis to build new offices for Antonis Papadopoulos Stadium at a cost of €400,000. The company D. Ellinas group will build the offices for free in exchange for advertising.

Anorthosis Famagusta lost 1–0 at home to AEK Larnaka on November 23. The goal came in the 52nd minute. Anorthosis were awarded a penalty in the 54th minute, which was saved. Jason Demetriou was sent off for dissent by referee Leontios Tratto.

=== December ===
Anorthosis Famagusta defeated Olympiakos Nicosia 2–1 away on December 3 with scorers Okkas and Rezek. Carlos André received a red card.

Anorthosis beat rivals Apollon Limassol 2–0 on December 10. Scorers were Marquinhos (57') and Konstantinou (93').

Anorthosis won against Ethnikos Achna FC on December 16. Anorthosis scorers were Ricardo Laborde from a free-kick and Vincent Laban after an assist from Okkas.

=== January ===
Anorthosis won 3–0 in the Famagustan derby against rival Nea Salamina with goals from Okkas 34', Laborde 70' and Angelov 85' on January 7. Anorthosis had the first possibility to score with Sielis in the 4th minute. Their opponents balanced the match and came close to scoring with Julian Gray in the 33rd minute, with both groups consumed the greater part of the first half in the midfield area. Anorthosis scored in the 34th minute, with a goal by Okkas. In the second half, the opponent tried to become more threatening, but Anorthosis managed to lock the game with Laborde scoring in the 70th minute, assisted by the pass of Angelov and score 0–2. Anorthosis scored a third goal through Angelov (0-3). MVP: Okkas.

On January 12 Anorthosis announced the sign of contracts with the national Georgian football player Kvirkvelia.

The fifth consecutive victory was a 1–0 win against Enosis Paralimni. Laban was the sole goalscorer in the 76th minute with a penalty. Laban (5'), Burchill (16'), Laborde (20'), and Alivodic (27') all had scoring opportunities in the first half hour. Imsiot was sent off after receiving a second yellow card in the 33rd minute. Okkas (45') had the last chance of the first half, with both teams going scoreless in the locker room without goals. In the second half, the shot of Kolanis (66') hit the crossbar. Marquinhos (69') and Rezek (72') then threatened to score. After the successful penalty of Laban (76') to go 1–0 up, Konstantinou (79', 82') missed two goal-scoring opportunities. MVP: Laban.

Anorthosis was able to get big 1–0 win against Omonia Nicosia. Gold Roncatto goal scorer in 84th minute on January 21. He played with 10 players for half, was against the tradition in GSP. An excellent and cooled at the tactical level Anorthosis ended in the negative based on tradition with Omonia. and with the goal of Evantro Evandro Roncatto(85') took the victory 1–0. With ten of the first part of the "great lady" after the second yellow in Andić, lag behind the previous derby "the greens." With good pace started the match with both teams alternating supremacy. In good time the first game with Kozatsik managed to walk away before Avraam(4'), while the delayed Okkas features a counterattack Anorthosis (14'). Laborde (19') attempted with the shot, sending the ball just over the beams. Closed longest game in the first half, with both groups to be quite good inhibitory function, thereby missing the big stages in front of two places. The Efrem (33') he threatened to shoot target not found, while a weak Okkas header saw the ball ends up in his arms Georgallides(42'). Shortly before the completion of the first time the numerical balance changed the match, when Andić after a foul on Efrem, he saw ... yellow, the second of the game and was eliminated. The Bosnian defender should not be charged on the first yellow, since it seemed to make theater, as considered by Stelios Tryphonos. From early in the second half Omonia tried to push the advantage of the numerical advantage, but the greatest chance until that point of the mach has lost the Roncatto (51'), who shot from the level of penalty and he sent the ball out . Kvirkvelia (61') shortly after entering the game from great vantage sent the ball over the Georgallides. The answer came with Omonia the crossbar to direct foul of Avraam (63'), while Salatić header (64') came out slightly. Even with less Anorthosis player with good inhibitory function is not allowed in Omonia be particularly threatening, and again went on the offensive foul with Laborde to result in his arms Georgallides. The mistake did not cost Kozatsik to Anorthosis after the shot Da Silva (80') passed over the beams. The Roncatto (85') managed to find a goal after a superb action preceded by Laborde and put the score in front Anorthosis. The third and last minutes late Avraam attempted the shot, the ball and to oppose the resulting corner. MVP: Ricardo Laborde. The Colombian made them all on the pitch. Troubled the defense of Omonia, as illustrated by the phase of the goals, and helped a lot and the defense with quick returns throughout the duration of the match.

On January 28, Anorthosis announcement the sign of contracts with the Greece football player Giorgos Makris from Atromitos.

=== February ===
On February 2, Anorthosis Famagusta agreed with the Moroccan international striker Jaouad Zairi. Specifically, he agreed with Anorthosis to sign a contract until next summer, with the option to renew the partnership for the next 1+1 years.

Crime and punishment. Anorthosis depended once again confined to the appetites of Laborde, but the Colombian ace expelled in the 67th minute and Aris the advantage four minutes after taking one valuable for him to win 1–0 on February 4. The decision of the referee Christos Nicolaides was instrumental in the evolution of the race, since Laborde is the number one risk for rival foci after the elimination of the "Lady", which was better up to that point, they actually threatened. The elimination of Laborde then, but the fault of the match was Colin, since the 71' not colluded with Kozáčik and "gave" the goal of victory in the Kingdom. He stayed at 27 degrees the "Lady" and risk losing valuable ground in the race for first place. On the other hand, three points may seem "gold" in the effort of Aris to remain in First Division.

Anorthosis Famagusta defeated by AEL Limassol On antonis Papapdopoulos on February 12. A good pace and alternating leadership contest began. The game was balanced in the first 20 minutes, without any stands of the two groups. The first major opportunity arose to Anorthosis when Okkas won a penalty reversal by Carlitos. The Vincent Laban (24') but was unable to send the ball into the net against the Degra, the Argentine goalkeeper proved once again this year unbeaten from the eleven steps. The "galazokitrinoi" after the penalty had already lost the psychology on their side and reached a breath away from the goal, but the crossbar stopped a shot from the side position Monteiro (34'). Until the first half was not created another great opportunity to ... 0–0 to seal the efforts of the players of both teams. The two teams alternated possession of the ball and the superiority early in the second half. Without getting specific risks in their play, they tried to be especially threatening to some individual efforts, but struggled to create great opportunities in front of their homes and the Degra, Kozáčik. Eventually the AEL Limassol was able to get ahead in the score ... pitched ringing in one phase, the Dosa Júnior (84') to be anointed scorer with a header after a corner Monteiro. Anorthosis then pressed in order to reach the equalizer, with Okkas to neglect immediately after (84') and Dédé stopped him in an exemplary manner. The 0-1 remained until the end of the AEL Limassol and celebrated his first victory in the history of the "Antonis Papadopoulos", but also the loneliness at the top of the standings.

The many significant absences bent to Anorthosis, which reached an important 2–0 victory at Apoel Nicosia, thanks to two goals from the first quarter (11', 13' Roncatto) on February 19. He stayed alive so the hunt for the title. In Lyon had left the team Jovanovic. Anorthosis entered dynamically in derby, took a significant lead by 13' and then left the premises APOEL, who had the ball, but not many clear chances to avoid defeat. Anorthosis showed unaffected by the number of absences at the beginning and started the game strong, taking the reins from the first minute. Indeed, already in the 4' had lost his first good opportunity to Roncatto, who had all the offensive against the absence of Okkas, Rezek and Michalis Konstantinou. Chiotis reacted correctly in this case, with the hosts threatened again with Roncatto (after the Marquinhos assist), which was delayed and could not seem threatening. The superiority of the "Lady" and bore fruit in a three-minute team Roni Levi became strong lead, and was preceded by 2–0. At 11' the Zairi achieved its maiden goal with the shirt of Anorthosis, utilizing a stunning, turn kick (the ball and found the beam) the balls Tzanisio Martins. And at 13' the Roncatto, who had warned the missed opportunities, he left "unpunished" in childish mistake Oliveira. With the 2-0 Anorthosis had achieved its goal and then made sure to keep more of kekteimenon. APOEL took the initiative, had possession of the ball and tried to rejoin the game with a goal, but had no clear phases. MVP: Zairi. "Shout" with the appearance that deserves to be in the lineup and with no absences so ... He achieved a great goal, had more opportunities, disrupting defenses APOEL continuously.

Anorthosis won 1–0 on "Famagusta" Mercury in the 22nd match of the Okkas scorer (44') on February 26. Better throughout the race, the "Lady" with Hermes to resist vigorously until the end of the race. Mathematically relegated and Mercury. Performance for a role in first place with an Anorthosis to have the absolute supremacy gipediki after he had possession of the ball players of Roni Levi ... to circulate around the hearth of Brooks trying to break off the defense of Mercury and violate the fireplace the goalkeeper's team Aradippou. The Okkas in 14' tried to shoot Brooks repel. Then the phase of Zaire did the shoot with Brooks to neutralize a corner. The shot of Laban (27') Okkas (36') found the target with "Lady" to insist on the same tempo and Mercury team to defend en masse. In 44' is utilized Okkas kick off the far in the area and making use of the wrong exit to Brooks header opened the scoring and shaped the outcome of the first 45 minutes. A similar picture in the second half to Anorthosis impose the rhythm of looking for the second goal. The Marquinhos free kick at 51' with Brooks to turn away in the corner then off to shoot over the beams through the area. The Rezek a header missed another opportunity in 67'. Then Hermes sought to rise to 83 in Catiaga attempts to shoot the height of the large area and to repel Kozáčik constant. The dystocia Anorthosis gave rights to ermes ... was looking to equalize. Mercury claimed the equalizer at the end without succeeding in getting the Anorthosis at the end of a stressful but it useful to then win with a score the same as the first round. The team Aradippou demoted and mathematics, as did the Renaissance a day before. MVP: The scorer Okkas gave the solution to dystocia with aggressive goals in 44' and the overall performance helped his team lagged in the ... goals.

=== March ===
Anorthosis took a 1–0 victory against Anagennisi Dherynia, with the goal from Lavorde on the 15' minute on March 5. Crescendo of missed opportunities for the "grande dame" with Laborde to make up a party to withdraw due to injury or undue relaxation in the last 20 minutes. Moderate pace in the first half of the match, with Anorthosis to press and after he had a good time with Rezek 12', managed to get ahead in the score with Laborde 15' with the Colombian scoring after the repulse of a Mastrou on the shot of Rezek. Anorthosis continued the momentum, the Renaissance merely a passive role, with the Laborde 20', Rezek 22' having other notable moments. The Rezek 37' near-scoring after a superb Laborde unstoppable energy, the Colombian taking the baton in lost opportunities in the latter stages of the first part 38',42'. The same setting and repeat Anorthosis to have absolute control over the match and lost two consecutive opportunities with Okkas 46',47' and the Andic 51', Laban 54' and Rezek 63'. In the last 20 minutes and especially after the exit of Laborde (forced change) Anorthosis lost the aggressiveness and speed ... threw in performance. The looseness came close to cost, by Milan Belić (82') having a good time for guests, like Shaka Bangura in the last minute of normal time the match. Eventually the 1-0 remained until the end of Anorthosis with anxiety to celebrate the victory in a game that could clean it up sooner. MVP: Ricardo Laborde. The Colombian returned several appetite after absence for punishment, with its good performance to seal it with a certain artistic goals and actions. The defense of the Renaissance especially in the first part with anything they could to limit the action of Laborde.

The ranked unattractive AEK Larnakas managed to stop Anorthosis and could not get the victory, since players of "Lady" is not shown in any case that is in the battle title and deserve to have hope on March 11. While the AEK was better in most of the race, managed to equalize quickly scored Kvirkvelia the third minute with a superb finish of the young Kyprianou at 34', while the Anorthosis had opportunities to get the win, but made even a modest emergence of a critical match.

fair victory with Anorthosis 2–1 against Olympiakos Nicosia in Andonis Papadopoulos even scoring two goals in the first half on march 17. Only managed Olympiakos Nicosia was to reduce. I did not ... take the Anorthosis to lose, everyone knew that the "Lady" and from the first second came determined to get their 3points. So when the "home team" took the reins of the game, they managed their first good step in the 8' to open the scoring after the ball vertical Marquinhos back defending the Olympicakos, Laborde managed Ernestas Šetkus to exit the, She has marketed the put team in place ... guide. Once the "Guests" somehow managed to balance the match came in Janício Martins 37' to make the 2 - 0, giving precedence to the most serious team, taking advantage anampoumpoula defense of "Mavroprasinon" tried and both groups the start of the second half to be imposed. By completing one hours play, however, the rate fell. So we got to 78' and a phase that does not smell goal came the reduction of scores from the Olympiakos, was the free kick from the left, higher than all the cast with a header and Duarte made his 2 to 1. In the remaining minutes, the Anorthosis could achieve any goal, Olympiacos was harmless, the goal never came and so the 2-1 was meant to be and the result. MVP: The Laborde for both goals scored and for general picture.

Cold shower for Anorthosis at the end, the "Lady" had control of the game for 91 minutes, went ahead on 26 minutes with Rezek, lost opportunities, had control, but the game ends when the referee whistles, this is believed to Apollo "stole" the extent, with the goal of Joao Paulo on 92' on March 25. In the early stages came close to us "asleep." Both teams were trying to impose their rhythm, more than two wings. And after the first phase came in 4', the next was the goal in 26'. In the first essential step, Anorthosis opened the scoring. He was shot in the vertical axis of Okkas, found a place in the right Rezek, he had time to sprint to defend Aleš Chvalovský Apollon and the expense to do with viewing the 1 - 0. In the next phase, a little lack to mate goals of the "Lady" when saliva came face-to-face with Chvalovsky, passed the Goalkeeper of Apollon, but delayed the plasma found Merkis and then to the right beam. Ten minutes had to pass to become a stage, and that Anorthosis when saliva found on the left with the 30 meters long pass to Rezek, he downed a nice ball, but his shot was blocked and the lukewarm Aleš Chvalovský. In the final two minutes of the first half, Apollon came close to call when the first phase, trolling kickoff Cissokho shot from the left, found the root of the right spar Kozatsik, while the second Stavrou from the shaft, just outside from the large area, got the shot but the ball ended up out. With the kickoff in the second half, the picture of the two groups were almost identical to the first half. Apollon tried to raise the lines and push, ineffective and even though the Anorthosis was more dangerous, as he found space on the counterattacks. And while all showed that 1 - 0 for the Anorthosis and it was finished, came Joao Paulo, taking advantage of the head of Merkis, he has marketed by Kozatsik, equaling to 1 to 1 and even more difficult the task of Anorthosis in the playoffs.

The quick goals with Anorthosis with Kvirkvelia on 4' are not conditions stop the AEL, which came immediately to equalize with Dede on 17'. But in the second half neither team risked and stayed 1-1 until the end on March 31. Best start he could not imagine Anorthosis, which took precedence even before completion of the fourth minute of the game! The extraordinary effort by the right Rezek completed kickoff in the area where the unattended Dutton Kvirkvelia made it 1–0 with a strong shot. The quick goals gave no feathers on the "Lady", as the AEL balancing the game and immediately warned the Anorthosis with a possible long shot of Monteiro 12'. Two minutes after the hosts lost opportunity for the classic 2–0, Rezek danced when the opposing defense, the nearby plasma but was repelled by the hard Degra 14'. The equalizer for FC did not take long to come but had to make a mistake in assessing the Kozatsik foul. The Dede just pushed the ball up close, after the repulse of the unstable Anorthosis goalkeeper, who was not a good day, since in many cases was unstable and offered no confidence in his teammates. In one of the outputs of a bad foul by Gilberto was fortunate enough not to Anorthosis a player of AEL towards the ball to send it into the net (38'). Two minutes after plasma Baby after all of Carlitos just passed out, the last phase of the good first half ended with imichronou.To clear possession of the ball for the AEL (close to 65%), but to repeat Anorthosis has improved in this area, but do not rise much above 40%. The repetition, however, the phases were fewer. In a three-minute-fire, AEL had three chances to get ahead: the Monteiro came to counterattack, but sentrare wrong in the area over the Kozatsik while his teammates were unmarked 58'. New error Kozatsik no cost to kick off the "Lady" since she managed to fix Colin 59'. One minute after the failed Dickson keeps control over a great deep ball into the area 60'. Even fewer stages in the last half hour, with Monteiro be located in the 74', but delayed and Rezek to lose the best chance of recurrence with Anorthosis header to repel Degra 76'. The Rezek and penalties sought in the process but that the Argentine goalkeeper does not seem to touch the 79' One minute before the Marios Nicolaou tried to "hang" by far the Kozatsik unstable, but he repelled difficult.

=== April ===
With one goal in 5 minutes of each half and top Laborde again, Anorthosis went through the empty GSP with 1-2 5' Rezek, 50' Laborde / 67' Manduca) and limited the title hopes of APOEL, increasing their own chances of finding the next year in Europe, regardless Cup on April 8. Anorthosis no longer have to wait what will happen in the Cup, so it knows whether to go to Europe and the fourth championship since now arrived at a short distance from Omonia third. Return to Cyprus League after a stunning career in Champions League was abnormal for APOEL, who did not follow the "double" on the Concorde last week. After this defeat, the "orange blues" stayed five points behind the AEL, which compete in the next two games. Anorthosis scored its first opportunity in a superb counterattack the Lavorde unfolded, with a point shot Rezek be foisted on 0–1. The "Lady" was succeeded by the early goal and then left the initiative in APOEL. The "orange blues" had possession of the ball (58% -42% in the first half), but that was meaningless. Guests vindicated the choice to wait for the opponent as little threatened in the first half. Just had two chances APOEL at this time. In 30' Adorno found in the vertical ball Marcinho who untargeted She has marketed, with Ailton not enough time to make close-up view. At 41' Manduca amarkaristos got good header, but passed out. The scene was repeated in the repetition of the APOEL keep the ball and Rehabilitation to transform into the first goal of a good time. It was at 50' when Okkas and Ronkato changed the ball before it reaches the Laborde, who after a nice individual action beat Chian, taking the 0–2. After the second goal APOEL awakened and began to push and lose some opportunities. Foremost exponent of the Manduca, but the biggest missed opportunity is Solari, whom he took a position Ailton a Wed Wed the plasma but went just over the crossbar 64'. In the crossbar and went to try the Jorge at 63', but the stage was as void, because his hand had been a Portuguese defense. The pressure bore fruit with APOEL Manduca to exploit parallel with plasma kickoff of Solari 67'. The Brazilian had a new chance in 78', but the header went out. Despite the decrease, however, the score and ball possession in favor of APOEL, Anorthosis held without major problems, the 1–2, taking a great victory in GSP! MVP: Laborde. It was through both phases of goals! The first goal gave ready Rezek in the second he danced APOEL defense and scored.

Even with ten players (Laborde miscarriage at 77'), Anorthosis defeat again empty GSP winning by 1–2 with goals, Omonia in the delays! on April 21. The "Lady" was preceded with Marquinhos in 60', with Omonia reaching the equalizer with Aloneftis (84'), but not to keep. Although a numerical disadvantage, Anorthosis arrived at yet another "double" after the tremendous energy of Okka with the Roncatto score at 93'. The chief exponent of the aggressive actions of Aloneftis, Omonia tried to get his head to score in the first half, which, however, the more conventional opportunities belonged to Anorthosis. Very nice plasma Aloneftis just passed the bar next to the first great moment of the race (7'), the "Lady" to respond immediately. Alabi, Karipidis and Margaça confused in corners and on contact with Rezek shot and sent the ball just over the crossbar (10'). At 23' the Rezek shoot through the area, but the ball found in colleges of defenders, with Anorthosis to waste a good opportunity. Suspected opportunity in this 31' long shot with the Aloneftis passed over the bar. Anorthosis protested a penalty phase Lavorde found in the ground after pushing the Margaça (35'). At 44' the Laborde found Kvirkvelia the left, the great kick-off of which reached the Marquinhos within the region, the strong shot but just passed beside the bar. The defensive function of the Concorde was a question mark before the game, the phase of the 49' but the head-Ronkato found in a location Wed Wed Rasheed Alabi opened the exemplary cut and clean the ball. The hosts responded with a good chance in 57' when he found Eftem, Bergougnoux in the area but the shot was good and went over the bar. As against the APOEL, so opposite in Omonia, Anorthosis struck first (against the "galazokitrinous" course had been too early), opening the scoring on 60 minutes. From foul in with Kyriakos Lavorde bar area near the line outs, came in 0–1 with the Colombian to perform and Marquinhos to score with a header. The goal gave wings to the guests, who could create a hazard in 64' when Lavorde found in beautiful Bali Rezek only in the heart of the region, the Czech Republic to lose control. From Laborde started or spent most aggressive action Anorthosis, but even a foolhardy Colombian brought the elimination of the 77', and when he had a card in possible makrarisma Aloneftis and rightly saw a second yellow. A miscarriage that changed the flow of the match against Omonia to raise the blood pressure and reaches the plasma equalize the best player in the match, the Aloneftis (84'). Four minutes after the Aloneftis found near the rollover, but failed to score. Anorthosis but had not said the last word. An amazing energy of the Okka 93' brought the second goal scorer in the Anorthosis Roncatto. New "Double" for the "Lady". MVP: Roncatto. The more stable in performance score of the player, there was quite menacing and helped very creative piece. He succeeded and the winning goal.

After the great "double" "Omonia regained third place in scoring, putting the tombstone of Anorthosis title dreams, which fell to fourth place. Ben Dayan 43', Alves 67', 74' and Bergougnoux 89' the scorers of Omonia. With a last minute problem began Omonia, with Efrem to be off the mission because of injury, as informed by "green" before the match starts. That went well in the derby was Anorthosis, which had the psychology of consecutive victories in the playoffs. Once in the 3' Okkas found in the area and fell to the ground, but the branding of Karipidis to justify the suggestion penalty requested by the home team. The phase stirred protests from side Anorthosis that was overturned by the early numerical balance, the "Lady" to be left with ten men for 17 minutes after marking hard from behind, Janício Martins tackly with both feet Aloneftis. Needless possible Janicio marking the center of the court, to the point that there was no danger. Despite the expulsion, the Anorthosis kept the reins of the match and was one that had the best chances in the first half: a miscarriage before the shot with just Evandro Roncatto outs 13' and then with a double long shot Evandro Roncatto and the new shot Okkas outside the region, to repel the Georgallides in both cases. Omonia showed early weakness to exploit the numerical advantage, but after the first half hour took possession of the ball and took the initiative. He could, however, to make dangerous phases. There was, however, highly effective, since seized the first opportunity that was: a foul by-side position near the line-outs performed by the Aloneftis, Ben Dayan header Nailed formed with the 0-1 (43'). Ronny Levy did not make changes after the elimination of Tzanisio, shifting the defense Marquinhos. At 52' but passed instead of the Jan Rezek and put Marko Andić in ... position, defense, restoring the Marquinhos center. Anorthosis was held at the beginning of the second half, but it was meaningless, since Omonia was tightly closed and did not accept phases. Neither created phases guests, but were highly effective in this game. So the second essentially doubled the chance of the finishes, putting ... and end the game. The Christofi was unable to win the Kozatsik from repelling unstable and whose failure to prosecute defense came near the plasma Alves for 0-2 67'. The Brazilian striker needed goals to regain confidence and scored a second goal, making the ball Spougkin took him to a location Wed Wed the 74' 0–3. Omonia came in fourth and goal, giving dimensions triumph in winning the Bergougnoux 89'.

=== May ===
With the goal of Babe 74' the AEL ascended the throne of Cyprus football after 44 years. The Angola player gave the victory to his team's 1–0 against Anorthosis, sent his friends to AEL 7 skies to win the sixth championship in history. The AEL was the team entered the stadium having the opposite story ... but to lift not only to resist strongly but also seeks to ... acts of the goal. From the first minutes both teams showed their desire to compete with aggressive approaches. Before completing one minutes Okkas race found in the area of the AEL Jrunior to catch up and the ball ends up in the hands of Degra. AEL's response came in 3 minutes when Dede tried a header to open the scoring in the firing position to avoids Laban on the line. The AEL has tried to impose its rhythm on the lift to wait and grow gradually. The Okkas at 14' left behind the defense of AEL and shot through the area sent the ball out. Four minutes later Gilberto with distant-shooting technician marked the crossbar of Kozatsik in a space that "galazokitrini" gipediki had the ascendancy. At 19' from near the Dickson took advantage of the defensive line inactive Anorthosis at the heart of the area and shot sent the ball into the right crossbar Kozatsik. The Baby with "warm" impossible shots not worried Anorthosis goalkeeper in remarkable unique opportunity in the third quarter of the race. In 35' Vincent Laban lost the unique opportunity through the area after the Roncatto assists to give precedence to Anorthosos the Degra repel. The last chance of the first part of the Dixon header sent the ball out. The AEL went into the second half to win peismomenoi and 50' by Dickson lost his first chance with a diagonal shot. Sato 57' leader Nikolaos long shot sent the ball out. At 74' the Babe after switching the ball to Voou came in and left-Way opened the scoring. In 81' Silas to shoot was not able to double its goal of AEL. In the last minutes of Limassol team kept the score in favor of and in conjunction with the victory of Omonia in GSP was crowned champion of Cyprus for the 2011–2012 season.

Two "catastrophic" errors from the Anorthosis defense brought two goals and APOEL first victory on the "essential" to 2-1 this year in "Antonis Papadopoulos". Scorers for APOEL Marcinho in the 37', Solari at the 60th minute, while Okkas reduced immediately after the 61st minute. Anorthosis went too hard in the match and took the reins of the game, creating the first opportunity, but Lavorde and Roncatto could not find the target, so until the 30th minute, the "Lady" could not translate its superiority in goals. This succeeded in APOEL 37th minute when Jurgen Colin made a serious mistake, actually gave the ball to Marcinho, he went and Gavriel Constantinou he has marketed and targeted. APOEL preceded the goal Marcinho, although the lift was better in most of the first half, had the initiative, but it was cool to the last pass. By the end of the first half could not threaten Anorthosis and the score was 0–1 at halftime. On several occasions, missed the good phases, although in the 53rd minute Soouza nearly scored when a foul ball that performed oppose Gavriel Constantinou and started following the outbreak of Anorthosis drove a corner away. In the 60th minute came the second mistake from the defense side Anorthosis Andic as the "gift made" in Tričkovski the ball, he spent the Gavriel Constantinou turned the ball into an empty Solari and sent her home in the nets making it 2-0 favor of APOEL. In the next phase, the Okkas reduced to a 2-1 Anorthosis, as did the nice Marquinhos while all the leader of the "Lady" was cast in the path of the ball and scored. By the end of the race, tried to Anorthosis the pressure on the tie, but kept the APOEL 2–1 in favor of and got his first victory this year against the "Lady".

== Club ==
=== Coaching staff ===
Position	Staff
Head coach	(Israel) Ronny Levy
Assistant coach	(Romania) Gabriel Caramarin
Fitness trainer	(Cyprus) Giorgos Georgiou
Goalkeepers coach	(Albania) Arjan Beqaj
Technical manager	(Georgia (country)) Georgi Kinkladze

Source: anorthosis.com

=== Club hierarchy ===
Position	Staff
President	Savvas Kakos
Deputy President	Christos Geranis
1st Vice-president	Giorgos Kkoshis
2nd Vice-president	Marios Leukaritis
3rd Vice-president	Michalis Ppekris
4th Vice-president	Charis Theocharous
Executive Director	Fragkeskos Hadjimichael
Financial Director	Christos Theodoulou

Source: anorthosis.com

=== Kit ===
Supplier: Puma
Sponsor(s): Cyta Mobile Vodafone

Home	Away	Third

Source: Anorthosis.com, Home kit

== Official sponsors ==
=== Mission Sponsors ===
(Cyprus) Cyta Mobile Vodafone • (United Kingdom) Betfair • (Germany) Puma • (Cyprus) Laiki Bank Championship • (Cyprus) SAPO • (Cyprus) D.Ellinas holdings • (Cyprus) Balla.com.cy

=== Sponsors ===
(Cyprus) Cyta Mobile Vodafone • (United Kingdom) Betfair • (Cyprus) LTV • (Cyprus) Cyta • (Cyprus) Coop Famagusta • (Cyprus) Coop Karpasias • (Cyprus) Coop Makrasykas

(Cyprus) Simplex • (Cyprus) Cosmos Insdrance • (Cyprus) Landas Colour • (Cyprus) STR8 • (United States) Coca-Cola • (Cyprus) Petrolina • (Malta) Interwetten • (Greece) Poker.gr

=== Supporters ===
(United States) TGI Fridays • (Cyprus) GGS • (Cyprus) Ydrogios • (Italy) Carrera Sunglasses • (Cyprus) ART HOME lisette • (Denmark) Carlsberg • (Cyprus) SYM

Source: Anorthosis.com

== Competitions ==
=== Laiki bank League ===
==== Classification ====
Pos	Team	Pld	W	D	L	GF	GA	GD	Pts	Qualification or relegation
2	Omonia Nicosia	26	17	6	3	47	16	+31	57	Qualification for second round, Group A
3	APOEL	26	17	5	4	39	13	+26	56	Qualification for second round, Group A
4	Anorthosis Famagusta	26	15	7	4	30	12	+18	52	Qualification for second round, Group A
5	AEK Larnaca	26	11	9	6	33	21	+12	42	Qualification for second round, Group B
6	Nea Salamis Famagusta	26	10	6	10	33	41	−8	36	Qualification for second round, Group B

Source: UEFA
Rules for classification: 1) points; 2) head-to-head points; 3) head-to-head goal difference; 4) head-to-head away goals scored; 5) goal difference; 6) number of goals scored

==== Playoffs table ====
The first 12 teams are divided into 3 groups. Points are carried over from the first round.

Pos	Team	Pld	W	D	L	GF	GA	GD	Pts	Qualification
1	AEL Limassol (C)	32	20	8	4	37	10	+27	68	Qualification for Champions League second qualifying round
2	APOEL	32	20	6	6	46	19	+27	66 (Note: APOE: 7pts; OMO: 4pts)	Qualification for Europa League second qualifying round
3	Omonia	32	20	6	6	56	23	+33	66	Qualification for Europa League third qualifying round (Note: The 2011–12 Cypriot Cup winners, Omonia, qualified for the third qualifying round of UEFA Europa League. Since they finished third, the fourth-placed team of the league also qualified for the Europa League.)
4	Anorthosis Famagusta	32	17	8	7	36	22	+14	59	Qualification for Europa League second qualifying round

Rules for classification: 1) points; 2) head-to-head points; 3) head-to-head goal difference; 4) head-to-head goals scored; 5) goal difference; 6) number of goals scored.
(C) Champions

==== Results by round ====
Round	1	2	3	4	5	6	7	8	9	10	11	12	13	14	15	16	17	18	19	20	21	22	23	24	25	26	27	28	29	30	31	32
Ground	A	H	A	H	A	H	A	A	H	A	H	A	H	H	A	H	A	H	A	H	A	A	A	H	H	A	H	A	H	A	A	H
Result	W	D	W	L	W	D	D	D	W	W	L	W	W	W	W	W	W	D	L	L	W	W	W	D	W	D	D	W	W	L	L	L

Updated to match(es) played on April, 2012. Source: anorthosisfc.com
A = Away; H = Home; W = Win; D = Draw; L = Loss

== Current squad ==
Last Update: April 09, 2012

No.	Pos.	Nat.	Name	MS	Notes
1	GK	(Slovakia)	Matus Kozacik	30	
2	LB	(Serbia)	Marko Andic	21	
3	CB	(Croatia)	Igor Tomasic	12	
6	DM	(Cyprus)	Christos Marangos	0	Captain
7	LB	(Georgia (country))	David Kvirkvelia	5	
8	LW	(Morocco)	Jaouad Zairi	6	
9	CF	(Cyprus)	Giannis Okkas	30	vice-captain
11	CF	(Brazil)	Evandro Roncatto	18	
17	RW	(Czech Republic)	Jan Rezek	24	
16	CF	(Cyprus)	Michalis Konstantinou	8	
20	AM	(France)	Vincent Laban	25	3rd captain
21	LW	(Colombia)	Ricardo Laborde	24	
22	RB	(Cape Verde)	Janicio Martins	33	
23	DM	(Cyprus)	Valentinos Sielis	10	4th captain
28	AM	(Brazil)	Marquinhos	21	
31	GK	(Poland)	Adam Stachowiak	4	
42	AM	(Cyprus)	Zacharias Theodorou	3	
44	CB	(Netherlands)	Jurgen Colin	33	
54	DM	(Greece)	Giorgos Makris	13	
83	CB	(Netherlands Antilles)	Civard Sprockel	29	

Last updated: 19 March 2012
Source: Squad statistics and Start formations
Only competitive matches.
Using the most used start formation.
Ordered by position on pitch (from back right to front left).

== Extra registered players for championship ==
No.	Pos.	Nat.	Name	MS	Notes
4	DM	(Bulgaria)	Stanislav Angelov	20	
25	CM	(Cyprus)	Christos Soteriou		
32	GK	(Cyprus)	Gavriel Constantinou		
36	CB	(Cyprus)	Nicos Efthimiou		
38	RW	(Cyprus)	Constantinos Laifis		

=== Out on loan ===
No.	Pos.	Nat.	Name	MS	Notes
18	CF	(Cyprus)	Marcos Michael		At EN Parekklisias
37	AM	(Cyprus)	Hadjigeorgiou		At Anagennisi Dherynia
TBA	CB	(Cyprus)	Vasilis Tofias		At Asil Lysi
TBA	DM	(Cyprus)	Andreas Georgiou		At Asil Lysi
TBA	RW	(Cyprus)	Nikos Pieri		At Frenaros
TBA	SS	(Cyprus)	Christoforos Christofi		At Ethnolps Assia

=== In ===
No.	Pos.	Nat.	Name	Age	EU	Moving from	Type	Transfer window	Ends	Transfer fee	Source
3	CB	(Croatia)	Igor Tomasic	35	EU	Kavala (Greece)	Transfer	Summer	2014	Free	
10	AM	(Serbia)	Nemanja Vucicevic	32	EU	Kavala (Greece)	Transfer	Summer	2014	Free	
11	CF	(Brazil)	Evandro Roncatto	32	EU	Ermis Aradippou (Cyprus)	Transfer	Summer	2015	€150,000	
2	LB	(Serbia)	Marko Andic	28	EU	Videoton (Hungary)	Transfer	Summer	2015	Free	
17	RW	(Czech Republic)	Jan Rezek	29	EU	Viktoria Plzeň (Czech Republic)	Loan	Summer	2012	Free	
27	GK	(Bulgaria)	Dimitar Ivankov	36	EU	Bursaspor (Turkey)	Transfer	Summer	2012	Free	
99	CF	(Bulgaria)	Emil Angelov	31	EU	Kardemir Karabükspor (Turkey)	Transfer	Summer	2012	Free	
28	AM	(Brazil)	Marquinhos	30	EU	CSKA Sofia (Bulgaria)	Transfer	Summer	2014	€300,000	
31	GK	(Poland)	Adam Stachowiak	25	EU	Górnik Zabrze (Poland)	Loan	Summer	2013	€50,000	
19	CF	(Cyprus)	Michalis Constantinou	34	EU	Omonia Nicosia (Cyprus)	Transfer	Summer	2012	Free	
38	RW	(Cyprus)	Constantinos Laifis	18	EU	Nottingham Forest (England)	Transfer	Winter	2015	Free	
7	CB	(Georgia (country))	David Kvirkvelia	31	EU	Panionios (Greece)	Transfer	Winter	2012	Free	
54	DM	(Greece)	Georgios Makris	31	EU	Atromitos (Greece)	Loan	Winter	2012	Free	
8	LW	(Morocco)	Jaouad Zairi	29	EU	PAS Giannina (Greece)	Transfer	Winter	2012	Free	

Total expenditure: ▼€500,000

=== Out ===
No.	Pos.	Nat.	Name	Age	EU	Moving to	Type	Transfer window	Transfer fee	Source
33	GK	(Cyprus)	Nikolas Asprogenous	26	EU	Omonia Nicosia (Cyprus)	Loan return	Summer	Free	
2	RB	(Spain)	Álvaro Brachi	26	EU	Espanyol (Spain)	Loan return	Summer	Free	
10	RW	(Spain)	Carles Coto	24	EU	Dinamo Tbilisi (Georgia (country))	Transfer	Summer	Free	
17	CF	(Cape Verde)	Cafú	33	EU	AEL Limassol	Transfer	Summer	Free	
32	DM	(Nigeria)	Richard Eromoigbe	27	EU	Alki Larnaca (Cyprus)	Transfer	Summer	Free	
34	DM	(Scotland)	Mark Fotheringham	28	EU	Livingston (Scotland)	Transfer	Summer	Free	
48	AM	(Serbia)	Marko Ljubinkovic	30	EU	Vojvodina (Serbia)	Transfer	Summer	Free	
8	DM	(Greece)	Giannis Skopelitis	33	EU	AEK Larnaca (Cyprus)	Transfer	Summer	Free	
99	FW	(Argentina)	Emanuel Perrone	33	EU	Asteras Tripolis (Greece)	Transfer	Summer	Free	
70	RW	(Portugal)	Miguel Pedro	28	EU	Feirense (Portugal)	Transfer	Summer	Free	
27	GK	(Bulgaria)	Dimitar Ivankov	36	EU	Free agent	Released	Summer	Free	
99	CF	(Bulgaria)	Emil Angelov	31	EU	Beroe (Bulgaria)	Transfer	Summer	Free	
12	LB	(Netherlands)	Jeffrey Leiwakabessy	31	EU	VVV-Venlo (Netherlands)	Transfer	Winter	Free	
37	AM	(Cyprus)	Adamos Hadjigeorgiou	19	EU	Anagennisi Deryneia (Cyprus)	Loan	Winter	Free	
10	AM	(Serbia)	Nemanja Vučićević	32	EU	Manisaspor (Turkey)	Transfer	Winter	Free	
16	RW	(Portugal)	Cristovão da Silva Ramos	29	EU	Levski Sofia (Bulgaria)	Transfer	Winter	Free	

Total income: ▲€0

=== Foreign players ===
EU Nationals

- (Bulgaria) (European Union) Stanislav Angelov
- (Czech Republic) (European Union) Jan Rezek
- (Greece) (European Union) Giorgos Makris
- (France) (European Union) Vincent Laban
- (Georgia (country)) (European Union) David Kvirkvelia
- (Netherlands) (European Union) Jurgen Colin
- (Poland) (European Union) Adam Stachowiak
- (Serbia) (European Union) Marko Andic
- (Slovakia) (European Union) Matus Kozacik
- (Croatia) (Bulgaria) (European Union) Igor Tomasic

EU Nationals (Dual citizenship)

- (Brazil) (Italy) Evandro Roncatto
- (Brazil) (Bulgaria) Marquinhos
- (Cape Verde) (Portugal) Janicio
- (Netherlands Antilles) (Netherlands) Civard Sprockel
- (Morocco) (France) Jaouad Zairi

Non-EU Nationals

- (Colombia) Ricardo Laborde

- Teams in the Cypriot First Division can register up to eighteen non-EU nationals and players with European ancestry.

==== Active international players ====
- (Cyprus) Valentinos Sielis
- (Cyprus) Zacharias Theodorou (U-21/U19)
- (Czech Republic) Jan Rezek
- (Georgia (country)) David Kvirkvelia

=== UEFA Club rankings ===
This is the current UEFA Club Rankings, including season 2011–12.

Last update: March 24, 2012

Rank	Country	Team	Points	PC
98	(Czech Republic)	Slavia Praha	19.070	+4
99	(Romania)	CFR Cluj	18.764	-2
100	(England)	Blackburn Rovers	18.507	-34
101	(France)	AS Nancy Lorraine	17.802	-26
102	(Spain)	Real Zaragoza	17.551	+3
103	(Cyprus)	Anorthosis Famagusta	17.099	+14
104	(Switzerland)	Young Boys	16.860	+12
105	(Italy)	Genoa	16.853	+5
106	(France)	AJ Auxerre	16.802	-25

PC = Position Changes

== Friendly matches ==
Win Draw Loss Postponed

27 June 2011 Friendly	Anorthosis Famagusta (Cyprus)	1 – 0	(Ukraine) Chornomorets Odesa	Lindabrunn, Austria
19:00	Nemanja Vučićević 22'	Report		Stadium: Lindabrunn training stadium

27 June 2011 Friendly	Anorthosis Famagusta (Cyprus)	3 – 3	(Ukraine) Metalurh Donetsk	Lindabrunn, Austria
19:00	Christos Marangos 31'; Jan Rezek 40'; Nemanja Vučićević 68'	Report; Report 2	Marcos Pizzelli 8'; Marcos Pizzelli 24'; Gevorg Ghazaryan 90'	Stadium: Lindabrunn training stadium

4 July 2011 Friendly	Târgu Mureș (Romania)	0 – 0	(Cyprus) Anorthosis Famagusta	Lindabrunn, Austria
19:00		Report		Stadium: Lindabrunn training stadium

6 July 2011 Friendly	Admira Wacker (Austria)	0 – 1	(Cyprus) Anorthosis Famagusta	Lindabrunn, Austria
19:00		Report	Jan Rezek 60'	Stadium: Lindabrunn training stadium

27 June 2011 Friendly	Anorthosis Famagusta (Cyprus)	2 – 0	(Bulgaria) Lokomotiv Plovdiv	Larnaka, Cyprus
19:00	Ricardo Laborde 13'; Vincent Laban 49' (pen.)	Report		Stadium: Antonis Papadopoulos Stadium

9 August 2011 100 Years cup	Anorthosis Famagusta (Cyprus)	3 – 0	(Greece) AEK Athens	Larnaka, Cyprus
21:00	Emil Angelov 7'; Emil Angelov 20'; Marcos Michael 85'	Report		Stadium: Antonis Papadopoulos Stadium

11 August 2011 100 Years cup	Anorthosis Famagusta (Cyprus)	1 – 0	(Greece) PAOK	Larnaka, Cyprus
18:00	Janício Martins 39'	Report		Stadium: Antonis Papadopoulos Stadium

20 August 2011 Friendly	Aris Limassol F.C. (Cyprus)	1 – 0	(Cyprus) Anorthosis Famagusta	Limassol, Cyprus
19:30	Ricardo Malzoni 27'	Report		Stadium: Tsirion Stadium

20 August 2011 Friendly	Anorthosis Famagusta (Cyprus)	1 – 1	(Cyprus) Apollon Limassol	Larnaka, Cyprus
19:30	Jan Rezek 51'	Report	Andreas Stavrou 90+3'	Stadium: Antonis Papadopoulos Stadium

23 August 2011 Friendly	F.C Ormidia (Cyprus)	2 – 2	(Cyprus) Anorthosis Famagusta	Larnaka, Cyprus
19:00	F.C Ormidia 65'; F.C Ormidia 84'	Report	Emil Angelov 8'; Emil Angelov 12'	Stadium: Koinotiko stadio ormideias

3 September 2011 Friendly	Anorthosis Famagusta (Cyprus)	2 – 3	(Cyprus) Olympiakos Nicosia	Larnaka, Cyprus
14:00	Nemanja Vučićević 33'; Cristovão Ramos 39'	Report	Chidi Onyemah 55'; Chidi Onyemah 57'; Delimir Bajić 60'	Stadium: Antonis Papadopoulos Stadium

12 October 2011 Friendly	Anorthosis Famagusta (Cyprus)	5 – 1	(Cyprus) Olympiakos Nicosia	Larnaka, Cyprus
17:00	Marquinhos 5'; Michalis Konstantinou 32'; Vincent Laban 61'; Stanislav Angelov 63'; Marquinhos 80'	Report	Marios Pochouzouris 38'	Stadium: Antonis Papadopoulos Stadium

10 November 2011 Friendly	Anorthosis Famagusta (Cyprus)	0 – 0	(Cyprus) Nea Salamina	Larnaka, Cyprus
14:00		Report		Stadium: Antonis Papadopoulos Stadium

== Europa League matches ==
Win Draw Loss Postponed

14 July 2011 2nd QR.	Anorthosis Famagusta (Cyprus)	3 – 0	(Georgia (country)) FC Gagra	Larnaka, Cyprus
19:30	Nemanja Vučićević 9'; Jan Rezek 35'; Jan Rezek 71'	Report	Zviad Chkhetiani (yellow card) 13'; Mykola Nakonechniy (yellow card) 15'; Sichinava (yellow card) 25'	Stadium: Antonis Papadopoulos Stadium; Referee: Radek Matějek (Czech)

21 July 2011 2nd QR.	FC Gagra (Georgia (country))	2 – 0 (2 – 3 agg.)	(Cyprus) Anorthosis Famagusta	Zestaponi, Georgia
20:00	Giorgi Gabedava 6'; Zviad Chkhetiani (yellow card) 39'; Giorgi Tkeshelashvili 40'; Irakli Khutsidze (yellow card) 69'; Nikoloz Jishkariani (yellow card) 75'	Report	Igor Tomašić (yellow card) 58'; Ricardo Laborde (yellow card) 60'	Stadium: David Abashidze; Referee: Peter Sippel (Germany)

28 July 2011 3rd QR.	Anorthosis Famagusta (Cyprus)	0 – 2	(North Macedonia) FK Rabotnički	Larnaka, Cyprus
19:00	Igor Tomašić (yellow card) 28'; Cristovão Ramos (yellow card) 31'; Vincent Laban (yellow card) 43'; Janicio Martins (yellow card) 76'	Report	Pance Kumbev (yellow card) 1'; Krste Velkovski (yellow card) 33'; Milovan Petrović 71'; Krste Velkovski 82'	Stadium: Antonis Papadopoulos Stadium; Referee: Harald Lechner (Austria)

4 August 2011 3rd QR.	FK Rabotnički (North Macedonia)	1 – 2 (3 – 2 agg.)	(Cyprus) Anorthosis Famagusta	Skopje, Macedonia
20:00	Milovan Petrovic (yellow card) 24'; Panče Kumbev (yellow card) 60'; Stole Dimitrievski (yellow card) 61'; Panče Kumbev 87'; Borče Manevski (yellow card) 90+6'	Report	Ricardo Laborde (yellow card) 19'; Jan Rezek 50'; Cristovão Ramos (yellow card) 50'; Cristovão Ramos 65'	Stadium: Philip II Arena; Referee: Nikolai Yordanov (Bulgaria)

== Cypriot Cup matches ==
Win Draw Loss Postponed

7 December 2011 1st Round	Anorthosis Famagusta (Cyprus)	6 − 0	(Cyprus) PAEEK Kerynias	Larnaca, Cyprus
16:00	Evandro Roncatto 12'; Vincent Laban 19'; Michalis Konstantinou 40'; Zacharias Theodorou 49'; Marquinhos 60'; Evandro Roncatto 62'	Report		Stadium: Antonis Papadopoulos, Attendance: 900; Referee: Loukas Soteriou (Cyprus)

1 February 2012 2nd Round	APOP Kinyras (Cyprus)	2 – 3	(Cyprus) Anorthosis Famagusta	Peyia, Cyprus
17:00	Katsiana 49'; Constantinos Constantinou 61'; Koullis Kyriacou (yellow card) 70'; Koullis Kyriacou (yellow card) 89' (yellow-red card)	Report	Marko Andić 18'; Jan Rezek 39'; Ricardo Laborde 68'	Stadium: Peyia Municipal Stadium; Referee: Thomas Mouskos (Cyprus)

8 February 2012 2nd Round	Anorthosis Famagusta (Cyprus)	3 − 0 (6 – 2 agg.)	(Cyprus) APOP Kinyras	Larnaca, Cyprus
16:00	Evandro Roncatto 9'; Evandro Roncatto 34'; David Kvirkvelia 41'	Report		Stadium: Antonis Papadopoulos, Referee: Marios Panagi (Cyprus)

14 March 2012 Quarter-finals	AEL Limassol (Cyprus)	1 – 0	(Cyprus) Anorthosis Famagusta	Limassol, Cyprus
16:00	Dédé (yellow card) 35'; Vouho 72'; Vouho (yellow card) 78'; Carlitos (yellow card) 90'	Report	Giannis Okkas (yellow card) 35'	Stadium: Tsirion Stadium; Attendance: 3.263; Referee: Marios Tsangaris (Cyprus)

21 March 2012 Quarter-finals	Anorthosis Famagusta (Cyprus)	2 − 1 (2 – 2 agg.)	(Cyprus) AEL Limassol	Larnaca, Cyprus
16:00	Giannis Okkas 20'; Marko Andić (yellow card) 34'; Jan Rezek (yellow card) 42'; Giannis Okkas (yellow card) 58'; Marquinhos (yellow card) 82'; Giannis Okkas 85'	Report	Vouho (yellow card) 9'; Dédé (yellow card) 32'; Dosa Júnior (yellow card) 49'; Edwin Ouon (yellow card) 56'; Vouho (red card); Luciano Bebê 84'	Stadium: Antonis Papadopoulos, Referee: Marios Panagi (Cyprus)

== Cypriot First Division ==
Win Draw Loss Postponed

28 August 2011 Match day 1	Ethnikos Achna FC (Cyprus)	0 – 1	(Cyprus) Anorthosis Famagusta	Akhna, Famagusta, Cyprus
19:00	Abdelkarim Kissi (yellow card) 17'; Wender (yellow card) 61'	Report	Vincent Laban (yellow card) 18'; Jan Rezek 78'; Giannis Okkas (yellow card) 81'; Matúš Kozáčik (yellow card) 90+2'	Stadium: Dasaki Stadium; Referee: Marios Tsangaris (Cyprus)

11 September 2011 Match day 2	Anorthosis Famagusta (Cyprus)	1 − 1	(Cyprus) Nea Salamina	Larnaca, Cyprus
18:00	Marquinhos 90+4'	Report	Diego León (yellow card) 41'; Julian Gray (yellow card) 60'; Nicos Photiou (yellow card) 73'; Julian Gray 90+1'; Nicos Photiou (yellow card) 90+2' (yellow-red card)	Stadium: Antonis Papadopoulos, Referee: Leondios Trattos (Cyprus)

17 September 2011 Match day 3	Enosis Paralimni (Cyprus)	0 – 1	(Cyprus) Anorthosis Famagusta	Paralimni, Cyprus
19:00	Hugo Faria (yellow card) 2'; Kostas Kiassos (yellow card) 50' (yellow-red card)	Report	Giannis Okkas (yellow card) 41'; Marko Andić (yellow card) 65'; Bojan Markovski 69' (o.g.)	Stadium: Tasos Markou; Referee: Savvas Zafeiris (Cyprus)

25 September 2011 Match day 4	Anorthosis Famagusta (Cyprus)	0 − 1	(Cyprus) Omonia Nicosia	Larnaca, Cyprus
18:00	Evandro Roncatto (yellow card) 65'; Jan Rezek (yellow card) 74'; Stanislav Angelov (yellow card) 77'	Report	Freddy 45+1' (yellow card) 45+1'; Margaça (yellow card) 47'; Iago Bouzón (yellow card) 70'; Bruno Aguiar (yellow card) 89'	Stadium: Antonis Papadopoulos, Referee: Christos Nicolaides (Cyprus)

2 October 2011 Match day 5	Alki Larnaka (Cyprus)	1 – 3	(Cyprus) Anorthosis Famagusta	Larnaka, Cyprus
19:00	Antonis Katsis (yellow card) 12'; Jonathan Aspas (yellow card) 41'; Arnal Llibert 90'	Report	Giannis Okkas (yellow card) 6'; Michalis Konstantinou 27'; Giannis Okkas 38'; Marko Andić (yellow card) 39'; Marquinhos (yellow card) 53'; Michalis Konstantinou 75'	Stadium: GSZ Stadium; Referee: Kostas Psevdiotis (Cyprus)

17 October 2011 Match day 6	Anorthosis Famagusta (Cyprus)	2 − 2	(Cyprus) Aris Limassol	Larnaca, Cyprus
18:00	Jan Rezek 6'; Marquinhos (yellow card) 34'; Jürgen Colin (yellow card) 40'; Jan Rezek 46'; Igor Tomašić (yellow card) 71'	Report	Jürgen Colin 28' (o.g.); Andreas Theofanous (yellow card) 29'; Andrés Imperiale (yellow card) 37'; Ventsislav Vasilev (yellow card) 57' (yellow-red card); Silvio González 60'; Carl Lombé (yellow card) 76'; Claudiu Ionescu (yellow card) 79'; Zoltán Kovacs (yellow card) 90+1'	Stadium: Antonis Papadopoulos, Referee: Marios Tsangaris (Cyprus)

23 October 2011 Match day 7	AEL Limassol (Cyprus)	0 – 0	(Cyprus) Anorthosis Famagusta	Limassol, Cyprus
17:00	Edwin Ouon (yellow card) 32'; Vouho (yellow card) 60'	Report	Stanislav Angelov (yellow card) 35'; Jan Rezek (yellow card) 67'; Jürgen Colin (yellow card) 84'; Ricardo Laborde (yellow card) 89'	Stadium: Tsirion Stadium; Referee: Marios Panagi (Cyprus)

28 October 2011 Match day 8	APOEL Nicosia (Cyprus)	0 – 0	(Cyprus) Anorthosis Famagusta	Nicosia, Cyprus
19:00	Aldo Adorno (yellow card) 28'; Savvas Poursaitidis (yellow card) 45'; Sanel Jahić (yellow card) 86'	Report	Jan Rezek (yellow card) 39'; Matúš Kozáčik (yellow card) 59'; Ricardo Laborde (yellow card) 63'; Janício Martins (yellow card) 84'; Vincent Laban (yellow card) 90+2' (yellow-red card)	Stadium: GSP Stadium; Attendance: 10,350; Referee: Leontios Trattos

7 November 2011 Match day 9	Anorthosis Famagusta (Cyprus)	1 − 0	(Cyprus) Ermis Aradippou	Larnaca, Cyprus
18:00	Jan Rezek 25'; Marko Andić (yellow card) 52'; Civard Sprockel (yellow card) 67'	Report	Demos Goumenos (yellow card) 53'; Dante Formica (yellow card) 71'; Angelis Charalambous (yellow card) 90+1'	Stadium: Antonis Papadopoulos; Referee: Kostas Psevdiotis (Cyprus)

19 November 2011 Match day 10	Anagennisi Dherynia (Cyprus)	0 – 2	(Cyprus) Anorthosis Famagusta	Paralimni, Cyprus
18:00	Demetris Kyriakou (yellow card) 9'; Athanasios Pindonis (yellow card) 54' (yellow-red card); Christos Kotsonis (yellow card) 58'; Robert Alviž (yellow card) 90'	Report	Giannis Okkas 40'; Ricardo Laborde (yellow card) 53'; Marko Andić (yellow card) 61'; Ricardo Laborde 69'; Marquinhos (yellow card) 75'; Civard Sprockel (yellow card) 83'; Janício Martins (yellow card) 85'; Stanislav Angelov (yellow card) 90'	Stadium: Tasos Markou; Referee: Marios Stamatis (Cyprus)

26 November 2011 Match day 11	Anorthosis Famagusta (Cyprus)	0 − 1	(Cyprus) AEK Larnaca F.C.	Larnaca, Cyprus
18:00	Ricardo Laborde (yellow card) 38'; Marquinhos (yellow card) 66'; Janício Martins (yellow card) 87'	Report	Edwin Linssen (yellow card) 25'; Giannis Skopelitis (yellow card) 29'; Gonzalo García 50'; Kevin Hofland (yellow card) 52'; Tim de Cler (yellow card) 53'; Ander Murillo (yellow card) 90'; Jason Demetriou (red card) 90+2'	Stadium: Antonis Papadopoulos; Referee: Leontios Trattos (Cyprus)

3 December 2011 Match day 12	Olympiakos Nicosia (Cyprus)	1 – 2	(Cyprus) Anorthosis Famagusta	Nicosia, Cyprus
18:00	Paulo de Pina (yellow card) 68'; Mércio 80'; Carlos André (red card) 89'	Report	Giannis Okkas 28'; Valentinos Sielis (yellow card) 28'; Jan Rezek (yellow card) 46'; Marko Andić (yellow card) 63'; Jan Rezek (red card) 83'	Stadium: GSP Stadium; Referee: Marios Tsangaris(Cyprus)

10 December 2011 Match day 13	Anorthosis Famagusta (Cyprus)	2 − 0	(Cyprus) Apollon Limassol	Larnaca, Cyprus
18:00	Marquinhos 56'; Marquinhos (yellow card) 71'; Valentinos Sielis (yellow card) 88'; Michalis Konstantinou 90+3'	Report	Giorgos Merkis (yellow card) 29'; Waheed Oseni (yellow card) 40'; Martin Kolar (yellow card) 63'; Martin Kolar (yellow card) 68'; Ousmane Cissokho (yellow card) 84'	Stadium: Antonis Papadopoulos; Referee: Marios Panagi (Cyprus)

16 December 2011 Match day 14	Anorthosis Famagusta (Cyprus)	2 – 0	(Cyprus) Ethnikos Achna FC	Larnaca, Cyprus
18:00	Ricardo Laborde 15'; Vincent Laban 35'; Janício Martins (yellow card) 78'; Ricardo Laborde (yellow card) 80'	Report	Elias Vattis (yellow card) 20'	Stadium: Antonis Papadopoulos; Referee: Vasilis Demetriou (Cyprus)

7 January 2012 Match day 15	Nea Salamina (Cyprus)	0 − 3	(Cyprus) Anorthosis Famagusta	Larnaca, Cyprus
16:00	Nicos Photiou (yellow card) 58'	Report	Giannis Okkas 38'; Ricardo Laborde 60'; Stanislav Angelov 86'	Stadium: Ammochostos Stadium, Referee: Marios Tsangaris (Cyprus)

14 January 2012 Match day 16	Anorthosis Famagusta (Cyprus)	1 – 0	(Cyprus) Enosis Paralimni	Larnaca, Cyprus
19:00	Vincent Laban 41' (pen.); Cristovão Ramos (yellow card) 90+1'	Report	Hugo Faria (yellow card) 8'; Radovan Krivokapić (yellow card) 23'; Kristof Imschoot (yellow card) 33' (yellow-red card); Eleftherios Mertakas (yellow card) 45'	Stadium: Antonis Papadopoulos; Referee: Iraklis Irakleous (Cyprus)

21 January 2012 Match day 17	Omonia Nicosia (Cyprus)	0 - 1	(Cyprus) Anorthosis Famagusta	Nicosia, Cyprus
14:30	Yuval Spungin (yellow card) 29'; Sofiane Cherfa (yellow card) 61'; Alex da Silva (yellow card) 89'	Report	Marko Andić (red card) 45'; Stanislav Angelov (yellow card) 45'; Marquinhos (yellow card) 45'; Ricardo Laborde (yellow card) 62'; Evandro Roncatto 84'	Stadium: GSP Stadium; Referee: Stelios Trifonos (Cyprus)

27 January 2012 Match day 18	Anorthosis Famagusta (Cyprus)	1 – 0	(Cyprus) Alki Larnaca	Larnaca, Cyprus
18:00	Cristovão Ramos (yellow card) 37'; Nemanja Vučićević (yellow card) 74'; Vincent Laban (yellow card) 81'	Report	Siniša Dobrašinović (yellow card) 19'; Sidnei (yellow card) 48'; Barge (yellow card) 53'; Elias Charalambous (yellow card) 69'; Kostadin Bashov (yellow card) 88'	Stadium: Antonis Papadopoulos; Referee: Stephanos Zaphiris (Cyprus)

4 February 2012 Match day 19	Aris Limassol (Cyprus)	1 – 0	(Cyprus) Anorthosis Famagusta	Limassol, Cyprus
16:00	Christos Charalampous (yellow card) 24'; Panayiotis Ioannou (yellow card) 27'; Andreas Theofanous (yellow card) 52'; Giorgos Vasiliou (yellow card) 64'; Giorgos Vasiliou 71'; Andrei Stepanov (yellow card) 80'	Report	Civard Sprockel (yellow card) 19'; Ricardo Laborde (red card) 67'; Vincent Laban (yellow card) 69'	Stadium: Tsirion Stadium; Referee: Christos Nikolaides(Cyprus)

12 February 2012 Match day 20	Anorthosis Famagusta (Cyprus)	0 – 1	(Cyprus) AEL Limassol	Larnaca, Cyprus
16:00	Marquinhos (yellow card) 45'; Stanislav Angelov (yellow card) 55'; Giannis Okkas (yellow card) 56'; Vincent Laban (yellow card) 79'; Jan Rezek (yellow card) 81'	Report	Dosa Júnior (yellow card) 23'; Vouho (yellow card) 61'; Dédé (yellow card) 81'; Dosa Júnior (yellow card) 69'; Kostadin Bashov 84'	Stadium: Antonis Papadopoulos; Referee: Dimitris Masias (Cyprus)

19 February 2012 Match day 21	Anorthosis Famagusta (Cyprus)	2 – 0	(Cyprus) Apoel Nicosia	Larnaca, Cyprus
15:00	Jaouad Zairi 11'; Evandro Roncatto 14'; Jaouad Zairi (yellow card) 31'; Janício Martins (yellow card) 52'	Report	William Boaventura (yellow card) 29'; Marcinho (yellow card) 37'	Stadium: Antonis Papadopoulos; Attendance: 6,000; Referee: Leontios trattos (Cyprus)

26 February 2012 Match day 22	Ermis Aradippou (Cyprus)	0 – 1	(Cyprus) Anorthosis Famagusta	Larnaca, Cyprus
18:00	Demetris Moulazimis (yellow card) 50'; Stelios Demetriou (yellow card) 62'; Demos Goumenos (yellow card) 73'	Report	Giannis Okkas 44'; Vincent Laban (yellow card) 82'; Valentinos Sielis (yellow card) 89'	Stadium: Ammochostos Stadium; Referee: Iraklis Irakleous (Cyprus)

5 March 2012 Match day 23	Anorthosis Famagusta (Cyprus)	2 – 0	(Cyprus) Anagennisi Dherynia	Larnaca, Cyprus
18:00	Ricardo Laborde 14'	Report	Athanasios Pindonis (yellow card) 12'; Panayiotis Spyrou (yellow card) 78'; Milan Belić (yellow card) 79'	Stadium: Antonis Papadopoulos; Referee: Charalambos Elia (Cyprus)

11 March 2012 Match day 24	AEK Larnaca F.C. (Cyprus)	1 − 1	(Cyprus) Anorthosis Famagusta	Larnaca, Cyprus
18:00	Koullis Pavlou (yellow card) 29'; Demetris Kyprianou 35'	Report	David Kvirkvelia 3'; Jan Rezek (yellow card) 78'; Stanislav Angelov 82'	Stadium: GSZ Stadium; Referee: Dimetris Chrysostomou (Cyprus)

17 March 2012 Match day 23	Anorthosis Famagusta (Cyprus)	2 – 1	(Cyprus) Olympiakos Nicosia	Larnaca, Cyprus
18:00	Ricardo Laborde 8'; Janício Martins 37'	Report	Paulinho (yellow card) 39'; Paulo Pina (yellow card) 51'; Carlos André (yellow card) 55'; Delimir Bajić (yellow card) 78'; Moussa Koita (yellow card) 80'	Stadium: Antonis Papadopoulos; Referee: Dimetris Masias (Cyprus)

25 March 2012 Match day 26	Apollon Limassol (Cyprus)	1 − 1	(Cyprus) Anorthosis Famagusta	Limassol, Cyprus
18:00	Ousmane Cissokho (yellow card) 20'; Hristijan Kirovski (yellow card) 69'; Charalambos Kyriacou (yellow card) 83'; João Paulo 90'	Report	Jan Rezek 26'; David Kvirkvelia (yellow card) 28'; Vincent Laban 38'; Marquinhos (yellow card) 42'	Stadium: Tsirion Stadium; Referee: Iraklis Irakleous (Cyprus)

31 March 2012 2nd R. Match Day 1	Anorthosis Famagusta (Cyprus)	1 – 1	(Cyprus) AEL Limassol	Larnaca, Cyprus
17:00	David Kvirkvelia 4'; Marko Andić (yellow card) 37'; Valentinos Sielis (yellow card) 44'	Report	Dédé 18'; Dédé (yellow card) 24'; Marco Airosa (yellow card) 67'	Stadium: Antonis Papadopoulos; Referee: Marios Tsangaris (Cyprus)

8 April 2012 2nd R. Match Day 2	Apoel Nicosia (Cyprus)	1 – 2	(Cyprus) Anorthosis Famagusta	Nicosia, Cyprus
17:00	Savvas Poursaitides (yellow card) 37'; Paulo Jorge (yellow card) 42'; Gustavo Manduca 68'	Report	Jan Rezek 5'; Vincent Laban (yellow card) 54'; Ricardo Laborde 50'; Davit Kvirkvelia (yellow card) 76'; Matúš Kozáčik (yellow card) 79'	Stadium: GSP Stadium; Attendance: Behind closed doors Referee: Charalambos Skapoullis (Cyprus)

21 April 2012 2nd R. Match Day 3	Omonia Nicosia (Cyprus)	1 – 2	(Cyprus) Anorthosis Famagusta	Nicosia, Cyprus
17:00	Charalambos Kyriakou (yellow card) 14'; Bruno Aguiar (yellow card) 77'; Stathis Aloneftis 84'	Report	Ricardo Laborde (yellow card) 6'; Marquinhos 60'; Ricardo Laborde (yellow card) 77' (yellow-red card); Evandro Roncatto 90+3'	Stadium: GSP Stadium; Attendance: Behind closed doors Referee: Leontios Trattos (Cyprus); Man of the Match: Evandro Roncatto

28 April 2012 2nd R. Match Day 4	Anorthosis Famagusta (Cyprus)	0 – 4	(Cyprus) Omonia Nicosia	Larnaca, Cyprus
17:00	Janicio Martins (red card) 16'; Civard Sprockel (yellow card) 82'	Report	David Ben Dayan (yellow card) 20'; Yuval Spungin (yellow card) 22'; Stathis Aloneftis (yellow card) 36'; David Ben Dayan 43'; Christos Karipidis (yellow card) 53'; Andre Alves 67'; Andre Alves 75'; Bryan Bergougnoux 89'	Stadium: Antonis Papadopoulos; Attendance: Behind closed doors Referee: Dimitris Chrisostomou (Cyprus)

5 May 2012 2nd R. Match Day 5	AEL Limassol (Cyprus)	1 – 0	(Cyprus) Anorthosis Famagusta	Limassol, Cyprus
18:00	Marco Airosa (yellow card) 23'; Luciano Bebê 74'	Report	Giannis Okkas (yellow card) 24'; Valentinos Sielis (yellow card) 48'; Giorgos Makris (yellow card) 59'	Stadium: Tsirion Stadium; Attendance: 10,612; Referee: Marios Tsangaris (Cyprus)

12 May 2012 2nd R. Match Day 6	Anorthosis Famagusta (Cyprus)	1 – 2	(Cyprus) Apoel Nicosia	Larnaca, Cyprus
17:00	Jürgen Colin (yellow card) 51'; Giannis Okkas 61'; Giannis Okkas (yellow card) 64'; Dato Kvirkvelia (yellow card) 70'; Marko Andić (yellow card) 79'	Report	Paulo Jorge (yellow card) 14'; Marcinho 37'; Hélio Pinto (yellow card) 49'; Esteban Solari 60'; Esteban Solari (yellow card) 63'	Stadium: Antonis Papadopoulos; Attendance: 1,023; Referee: Athos Chrisostomou (Cyprus)

== Squad statistics ==
				Total				Cypriot First Division		Cypriot Cup		UEFA Europa League		
N	Pos.	Name	Nat.	GS	App	Gls	Min	App	Gls	App	Gls	App	Gls	Notes
1	GK	Matus Kozacik	(Slovakia)	32	33		2970	29		2		2		
2	LB	Marko Andic	(Serbia)	23	26		2174	19		4		3		
3	CB	Igor Tomasic	(Croatia)	12	18		1154	13		2		3		
6	DM	Christos Marangos	(Cyprus)		3		47	3						Captain
7	LB	David Kvirkvelia	(Georgia (country))	3	11	3	736	10	2	1	1			
8	LW	Jaouad Zairi	(Morocco)	6	15	1	678	7	1	4		4		
9	CF	Giannis Okkas	(Cyprus)	30	38	8	2760	30	6	4	2	4		vice-captain
11	CF	Evandro Roncatto	(Brazil)	21	27	6	1907	22	2	4	4	1		
17	RW	Jan Rezek	(Czech Republic)	26	33	11	2540	25	7	4	1	4	3	
19	CF	Michalis Konstantinou	(Cyprus)	8	20	4	960	18	3	2	1			
20	AM	Vincent Laban	(France)	28	37	3	2631	29	2	4	1	4		
21	LW	Ricardo Laborde	(Colombia)	27	31	7	2346	22	6	5	1	4		
22	RB	Janicio Martins	(Cape Verde)	34	36	1	3157	27	1	5		4		
23	DM	Valentinos Sielis	(Cyprus)	11	23		1160	16		4		3		
28	AM	Marquinhos	(Brazil)	24	31	3	2257	25	2	5	1	1		
31	GK	Adam Stachowiak	(Poland)	4	4		360	1		3				
32	GK	Gavriel Constantinou	(Cyprus)	1	1		90	1						
38	RW	Constantinos Laifis	(Cyprus)		1		12			1				
40	AM	Adamos Andreou	(Cyprus)		1		25	1						
42	AM	Zacharias Theodorou	(Cyprus)	3	9	1	244	2		3	1	4		
44	CB	Jurgen Colin	(Netherlands)	36	38		3339	30		4		4		
54	DM	Giorgos Makris	(Greece)	16	16		1440	12		4				
83	CB	Civard Sprockel	(Netherlands Antilles)	32	33		2880	25		4		4		
4	DM	Stanislav Angelov	(Bulgaria)	20	22		1704	19		3				Reserve squad
12	LB	Jeffrey Leiwakabessy	(Netherlands)	9	13		1056	10		1		2		to VVV-Venlo
10	AM	Nemanja Vucicevic	(Serbia)	7	10	1	577	6				4	1	to Manisaspor
16	RW	Cristovão Ramos	(Portugal)	1	8	1	266	6				2	1	to Levski Sofia

Last updated: 18 March 2012
Source: anorthosis.com, ano1911news.blogspot.com
Ordered by start team and position on pitch (from back right to front left), minutes played, squad number
0 shown as blank

=== Goals ===
R	Player	Position	Championship	Europa League	Cypriot Cup	Total
1	(Czech Republic) Jan Rezek	RW	7	3	1	11
2	(Cyprus) Giannis Okkas	CF	6	0	2	8
3	(Colombia) Ricardo Laborde	LW	6	0	1	7
4	(Brazil) Evandro Roncatto	CF	3	0	4	7
5	(Cyprus) M.Konstantinou	CF	3	0	1	4
6	(Brazil) Marquinhos	AM	3	0	1	4
6	(France) Vincent Laban	AM	2	0	1	3
8	(Georgia (country)) David Kvirkvelia	LB	2	0	0	2
9	(Portugal) Cristovão Ramos	RW	0	1	0	1
9	(Serbia) Nemanja Vucicevic	AM	0	1	0	1
9	(Cape Verde) Janicio Martins	RB	1	0	0	1
9	(Cyprus) Zacharias Theodorou	AM	0	0	1	1
9	(Morocco) Jaouad Zairi	LW	1	0	0	1
(Bulgaria) Stanislav Angelov	DM	1	0	1	1	

=== Disciplinary record ===
N	P	Nat.	Name	Championship			Europa League			Cypriot Cup			Others			Total			Notes
N	P	Nat.	Name	Yellow card	Second yellow card	Red card	Yellow card	Second yellow card	Red card	Yellow card	Second yellow card	Red card	Yellow card	Second yellow card	Red card	Yellow card	Second yellow card	Red card	Notes
21	LW	(Colombia)	Ricardo Laborde	8	1	1	2									10	1	1	
22	RB	(Cape Verde)	Janicio Martins	6		1	1									7		1	
17	RW	(Czech Republic)	Jan Rezek	6		1				1						7		1	
20	AM	(France)	Vincent Laban	6	1		1									7	1		
2	LB	(Serbia)	Marko Andić	7	1					1						8	1		
28	AM	(Brazil)	Marquinhos	8						1						9			
4	DM	(Bulgaria)	Stanislav Angelov	6												6			2nd team
9	CF	(Cyprus)	Giannis Okkas	6						2						8			
83	CB	(Netherlands Antilles)	Civard Sprockel	5												5			
23	DM	(Cyprus)	Valentinos Sielis	5						2						7			
16	RW	(Portugal)	Cristovão Ramos	2			2									4			Levski Sof.
44	CB	(Netherlands)	Jurgen Colin	3												3			
3	CB	(Croatia)	Igor Tomasic	1			2									3			
1	GK	(Slovakia)	Matúš Kozáčik	2												2			
11	CF	(Brazil)	Evandro Roncatto	2												2			
7	LB	(Georgia (country))	David Kvirkvelia	2												2			
10	AM	(Serbia)	Nemanja Vučićević	1												1			Manisaspor
8	LW	(Morocco)	Jaouad Zairi	1												1			
54	DM	(Greece)	Giorgos Makris	1												1			
Players		18	Card totals	67	2	2	8			7						82	2	2	

Last updated: 3 April 2012
Source: Competitive matches and Cfa.com.cy, Anorthosis.com
Ordered by (red card) , (second yellow card) and (yellow card)
(yellow card) = Number of bookings; (second yellow card) = Number of sending offs after a second yellow card; (red card) = Number of sending offs by a direct red card.

- 4 (yellow card) one match ban
- 6 (yellow card) one match ban
- 8 (yellow card) one match ban
- 10 (yellow card) one match ban
- 12+ (yellow card) one match ban per card
- 1+1 (yellow card) (yellow-red card) one match ban - (red card) 1-4 match ban
- (Colombia) Ricardo Laborde (red card) (3 match ban)
- (Czech Republic) Jan Rezek (red card) (3 match ban)

=== Most Valuable Players ===
R	Player	Position	Age	Market Value
1	(Colombia) Ricardo Laborde	LW	24	€3,000,000
2	(France) Vincent Laban	AM	27	€1,500,000
3	(Czech Republic) Jan Rezek	RW	29	€1,200,000
4	(Cyprus) Christos Marangos	DM	28	€1,000,000
4	(Brazil) Evandro Roncatto	CF	25	€1,000,000

Last updated: 2 April 2012

=== Top 5 Players Rankings ===
R	Player	Position	MVP	Points
1	(Colombia) Ricardo Laborde	LW	7	31.5
2	(Cyprus) Giannis Okkas	CF	3	20
3	(Czech Republic) Jan Rezek	RW	1	18
4	(Brazil) Evandro Roncatto	CF	2	14.5
5	(France) Vincent Laban	DM	1	8.5

Goals - Assist

- Championship = 1.5 Points
- Europa League = 1.5 Points
- Cypriot Cup = 1 Points
- Times MVP = 1*Times

== See also ==
- 2011–12 Cypriot First Division
- 2011–12 UEFA Europa League
- 2011–12 Cypriot Cup
