= Roncatto =

Roncatto is a surname. Notable people with the surname include:

- Evandro Roncatto (born 1986), Brazilian footballer
- Gabrielle Roncatto (born 1998), Brazilian swimmer
