= Antonis Giorgallidis =

Cypriot footballer (born 1982)

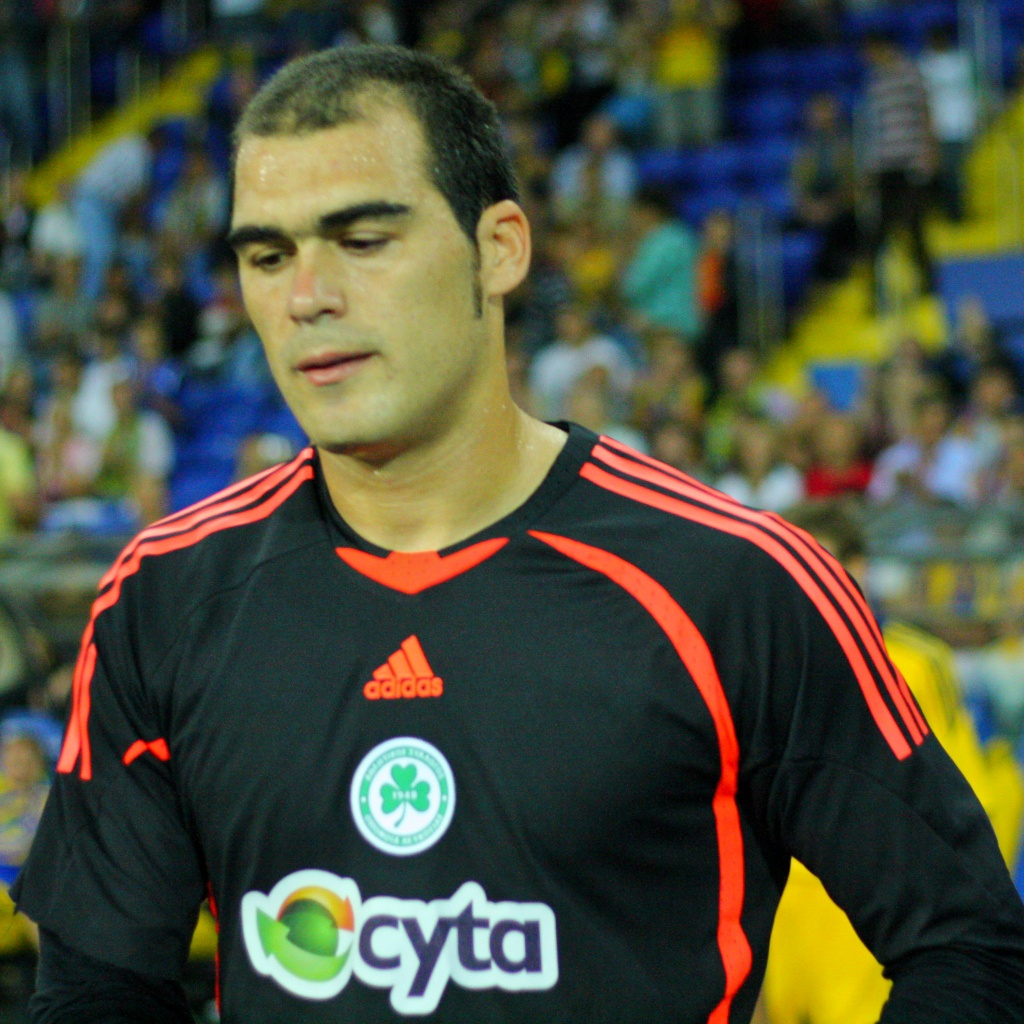

Personal information
- Full name: Antonis Giorgallidis
- Date of birth: January 30, 1982 (age 44)
- Place of birth: Larnaca, Cyprus
- Height: 1.92 m (6 ft 4 in)
- Position: Goalkeeper

Team information
- Current team: Anorthosis Famagusta (Goalkeeper Coach)

Youth career
- Anorthosis Famagusta

Senior career*
| Years | Team | Apps | (Gls) |
| 2000–2006 | Anorthosis Famagusta | 62 | (0) |
| 2006–2012 | Omonia | 128 | (0) |
| 2012–2013 | Alki Larnaca | 20 | (0) |
| 2013–2014 | Platanias | 32 | (0) |
| 2014–2016 | Omonia | 14 | (0) |
| 2016–2018 | AEK Larnaca | 14 | (0) |
| 2018–2019 | Olympiakos Nicosia | 25 | (0) |
| 2019–2020 | Anorthosis Famagusta | 0 | (0) |
| 2020 | Ayia Napa | 0 | (0) |

International career^{‡}
| 2005–2017 | Cyprus | 66 | (0) |

Managerial career
- 2022–2023: Enosis Neon Paralimni (Goalkeeper Coach)
- 2023–: Anorthosis Famagusta (Goalkeeper Coach)
- * Club domestic league appearances and goals as of 31 May 2019 ‡ National team caps and goals as of 23 August 2019

Antonis Giorgallidis (Greek: Αντώνης Γιωργαλλίδης; born January 30, 1982, in Cyprus) is a Cypriot retired football goalkeeper who played for the Cypriot National Team. He also played for six years for Anorthosis and one year for Platanias in Greece. On 21 April 2014, Antonis Giorgallidis returned to Omonia and signed a two-year contract.

== International career ==
He has represented Cyprus at youth level. He is the senior goalkeeper for Cyprus national football team.

== Honours ==
Anorthosis Famagusta:

- Cypriot Championship: 2000, 2005
- Cypriot Cup: 2002, 2003

AC Omonia

- Cypriot Championship: 2010
- Cypriot Cup: 2011, 2012
- Cypriot Super Cup: 2010

AEK Larnaca

- Cypriot Cup: 2017–18
