= Giorgos Vasiliou (footballer) =

Cypriot footballer (born 1984)

Personal information
- Full name: Georgios Vasiliou
- Date of birth: 12 June 1984 (age 42)
- Place of birth: Limassol, Cyprus
- Height: 1.71 m (5 ft 7 1/2 in)
- Positions: Left winger; left back

Team information
- Current team: Apollon Limassol
- Number: 88

Senior career*
Years	Team	Apps	(Gls)
2002–2008	Aris Limassol	165	(22)
2008–2009	AEP Paphos	11	(1)
2009–2012	Aris Limassol	44	(4)
2012–2021	Apollon Limassol	157	(2)

International career^{‡}
2011–2019	Cyprus	11	(0)
- * Club domestic league appearances and goals as of 17:12, 13 May 2021 (UTC) ‡ National team caps and goals as of 18:34, 13 March 2018 (UTC)

Georgios Vasiliou (Greek: Γεώργιος Βασιλείου; born 12 June 1984) is a Cypriot retired footballer who played as left winger and left back.

== International career ==
Vasiliou made his debut with Cyprus national football team on 11 November 2011 in a friendly match against Scotland at Antonis Papadopoulos Stadium.
