= Ricardo Laborde =

Colombian footballer (born 1988)

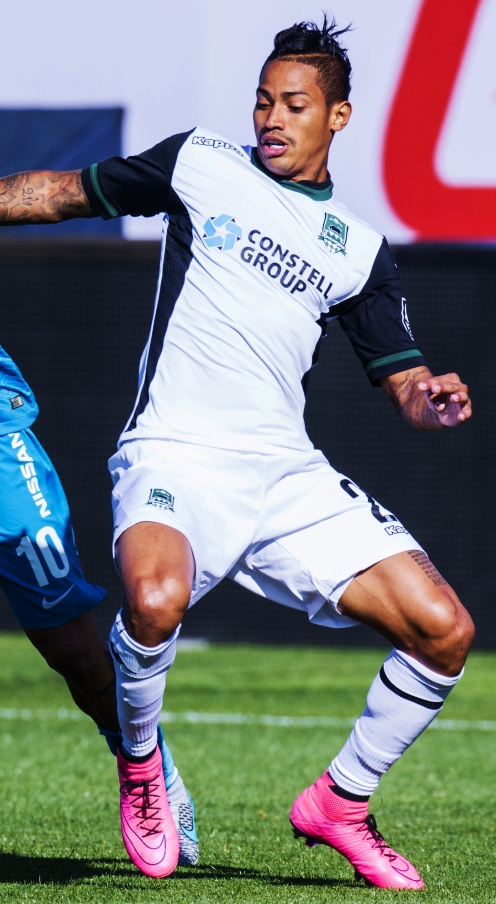
- With Krasnodar in 2015

Personal information
- Full name: Ricardo Alexis Laborde León
- Date of birth: 16 February 1988 (age 38)
- Place of birth: Cartagena, Colombia
- Height: 1.73 m (5 ft 8 in)
- Position: Winger

Senior career*
Years	Team	Apps	(Gls)
2006–2007	Academia	0	(0)
2007–2008	Náutico-PE	1	(0)
2008–2009	Lugano	14	(1)
2009–2012	Atlético Huila	8	(2)
2010–2012	→ Anorthosis Famagusta (loan)	34	(8)
2012–2013	Anorthosis Famagusta	25	(6)
2013–2018	FC Krasnodar	73	(11)
2018–2019	Anorthosis Famagusta	13	(1)
- * Club domestic league appearances and goals

Ricardo Alexis Laborde León (Spanish pronunciation: [riˈkaɾðo laˈβoɾðe]; born 16 February 1988) is a Colombian former footballer who played as a winger.

== Club career ==
Laborde began his career as at Academia, where he played for a year, before moving to Náutico. In 2008, he moves to Europe to join the Swiss club FC Lugano. He played in 14 matches and scored his maiden goal against FC Schaffhausen. After a year Laborde moves back to Colombia for Atlético Huila.

=== Anorthosis Famagusta ===
In July 2010, Anorthosis Famagusta announced an agreement with Ricardo Laborde for a year loan. Laborde debuted on 24 August 2010 against CSKA Moscow in Arena Khimki for UEFA Europa League. He entered the game as a substitution in the 51st minute. In the rematch Laborde starts basic, at 19-minute he left the pitch due to injury On 1 December 2010, he scored a hat-trick against Akritas Chlorakas for an Anorthosis victory of 5–0. His first league goal for Anorthosis was scored in the derby against APOEL, securing the victory for his team with a 2–0 win. After 15 matches with Anorthosis Laborde had scored a total of 5 goals. He helped Anorthosis to place in the next UEFA Europa League Competition and to take 3rd place in the Local Division.

Before the 2011–12 season, the club extended his loan deal for a further two years. On 12 February 2012, Laborde won the Carlsberg award for Player of the Month for January. On 18 May, Laborde was named to the ANT1 Team of the Season. On 1 June, Laborde joined Anorthosis on a permanent deal, signing a five-year contract.

=== Krasnodar ===
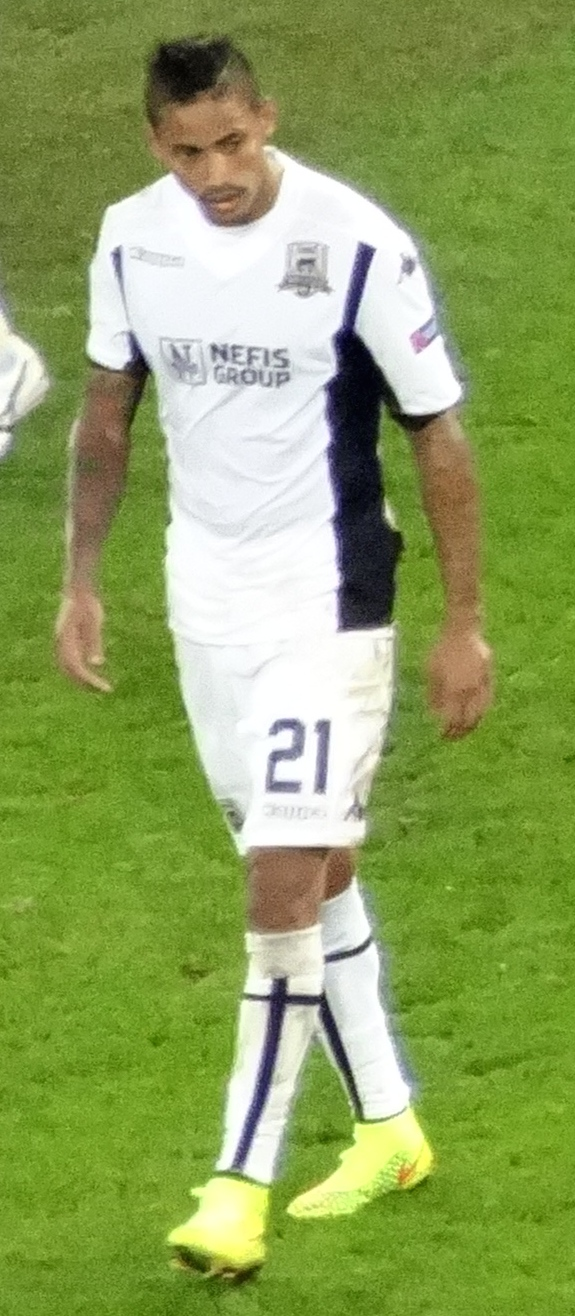
Laborde with Krasnodar.

On 18 May 2013, Krasnodar announced an agreement with Ricardo Laborde on a two-year contract, extending it till June 2017 in December 2014. On 1 May 2018, Laborde confirmed he would leave FC Krasnodar at the end of the 2017–18 season.

=== Return to Anorthosis ===
On 23 July 2018, he returned to Anorthosis Famagusta.

== Career statistics ==
=== Club ===
As of 11 March 2019

Club	Season	League			Cup		Continental		Other		Total	
Club	Season	Division	Apps	Goals	Apps	Goals	Apps	Goals	Apps	Goals	Apps	Goals
Náutico	2008	Série A	1	0	0	0	–		–		1	0
Lugano	2008–09	Swiss Challenge League	14	1	0	0	–		2 (Note: Two appearances in promotion play-offs)	0	16	1
Atlético Huila	2010	Categoría Primera A	8	2	0	0	–		–		8	2
Anorthosis Famagusta	2010–11	Cypriot First Division	12	2	1	3	2	0	–		15	5
Anorthosis Famagusta	2011–12	Cypriot First Division	22	6	5	1	4	0	–		31	7
Anorthosis Famagusta	2012–13	Cypriot First Division	25	6	3	0	4	2	–		32	8
Anorthosis Famagusta	2018–19	Cypriot First Division	13	1	2	0	0	0	–		15	1
Anorthosis Famagusta	Total		72	15	11	4	10	2	0	0	93	21
Krasnodar	2013–14	Russian Premier League	8	1	4	2	–		–		12	3
Krasnodar	2014–15	Russian Premier League	25	4	0	0	12	3	–		37	7
Krasnodar	2015–16	Russian Premier League	19	3	3	0	9	0	–		31	3
Krasnodar	2016–17	Russian Premier League	13	0	3	1	11	2	–		27	3
Krasnodar	2017–18	Russian Premier League	8	3	1	0	0	0	–		9	3
Krasnodar	Total		73	11	11	3	32	5	0	0	116	19
Career total			168	29	20	7	42	7	2	0	234	43

== Honours ==
=== Individual ===
- Carlsberg Player of the Month: January 2012
- ANT1 Team of the Season: 2011–12
- PASP best goal of the week: 2011(16th Match day)
