= Christos Marangos =

Cypriot footballer (born 1983)

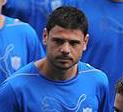
- Christos Marangos

Personal information
- Full name: Christos Marangos
- Date of birth: 9 May 1983 (age 43)
- Place of birth: Limassol, Cyprus
- Height: 1.84 m (6 ft 1/2 in)
- Position: Midfielder

Senior career*
Years	Team	Apps	(Gls)
2000–2005	Apollon Limassol	69	(3)
2005–2006	Anorthosis Famagusta	26	(2)
2006	Aris Thessaloniki	7	(0)
2007	Anorthosis Famagusta	8	(0)
2007–2009	Apollon Limassol	50	(3)
2009–2012	Anorthosis Famagusta	54	(11)
2012–2013	AEK Larnaca	21	(0)
2013–2016	Anorthosis Famagusta	37	(1)

International career^{‡}
2005–2016	Cyprus	22	(1)
- * Club domestic league appearances and goals as of 00:25, 31 May 2016 (UTC) ‡ National team caps and goals as of 8 December 2009

Christos Marangos (Greek: Χρίστος Μαραγκός; born 9 May 1983) is a Cypriot retired professional footballer who played as a midfielder.

== Career ==
He began his career in 2000, playing for Apollon Limassol and in his first season with his team he achieved to win the Cypriot Cup. He remained to Apollon until 2005, when he was transferred to Anorthosis Famagusta. After having a successful season with his team and playing in all the Championship matches for his team scoring two goals he caused the interest of the Greek team Aris and he transferred there in the summer of 2006. During the middle of the season, he returned to Anorthosis Famagusta. In June 2007 he signed once again for Apollon Limassol. On the 08/06/2009 the Cypriot player was transferred back to Anorthosis Famagusta and in June 2012 he moved to AEK Larnaca. Furthermore, in June 2013, he returned to Anorthosis Famagusta for the fourth time in his career.

=== International goals ===
Scores and results list Cyprus' goal tally first.

No	Date	Venue	Opponent	Score	Result	Competition
1.	11 February 2009	Makario Stadium, Nicosia, Cyprus	Slovakia	1–0	3–2	Friendly
