= Carlos André (footballer, born 1982) =

Portuguese footballer

Personal information
- Full name: Carlos André Filipe Martins
- Date of birth: 15 April 1982 (age 44)
- Place of birth: Setúbal, Portugal
- Height: 1.84 m (6 ft 1/2 in)
- Position: Winger

Team information
- Current team: Vitória Setúbal (sports director)

Youth career
- 1991–1993: Pelezinhos
- 1993–2001: Vitória Setúbal

Senior career*
Years	Team	Apps	(Gls)
2001–2002	Vitória Setúbal	0	(0)
2002–2003	Casa Pia	24	(0)
2003–2005	Oliveira Hospital	65	(7)
2005–2006	Espinho	20	(1)
2006	Pinhalnovense	4	(0)
2007–2008	Madalena	45	(16)
2008–2010	Doxa	57	(8)
2010–2012	Olympiakos Nicosia	51	(1)
2012	Atlético	2	(0)
2012–2013	Doxa	26	(1)
2013–2014	Tyrnavos 2005	24	(3)
2014–2015	União Montemor	30	(3)
2015–2016	Cova Piedade	9	(1)

Managerial career
- 2019–2022: Oriental Dragon (sports director)
- 2022–2023: Amora (sports director)
- 2023–: Vitória Setúbal (sports director)
- * Club domestic league appearances and goals

Carlos André Filipe Martins (born 15 April 1982), known as Carlos André, is a Portuguese retired footballer who played as a left winger and current sports director of Vitória Setúbal.

== Career ==
=== Management career ===
Forced to end his career in 2015/16, due to a knee injury while playing for Cova Piedade, André graduated in Sports and started studying for a master's degree in sport management and direction, which he finished in 2020.

In November 2019, André was hired as the Oriental Dragon's Sports Director. He left the club in the summer of 2022, where he was instead employed as sports director at Amora. He left the club at the end of the season by mutual agreement.

On 22 June 2023 André returned to his former club, Vitória Setúbal, as the club's new sporting director.
