= Nemanja Vučićević =

Serbian footballer

Nemanja Vučićević Немања Вучићевић
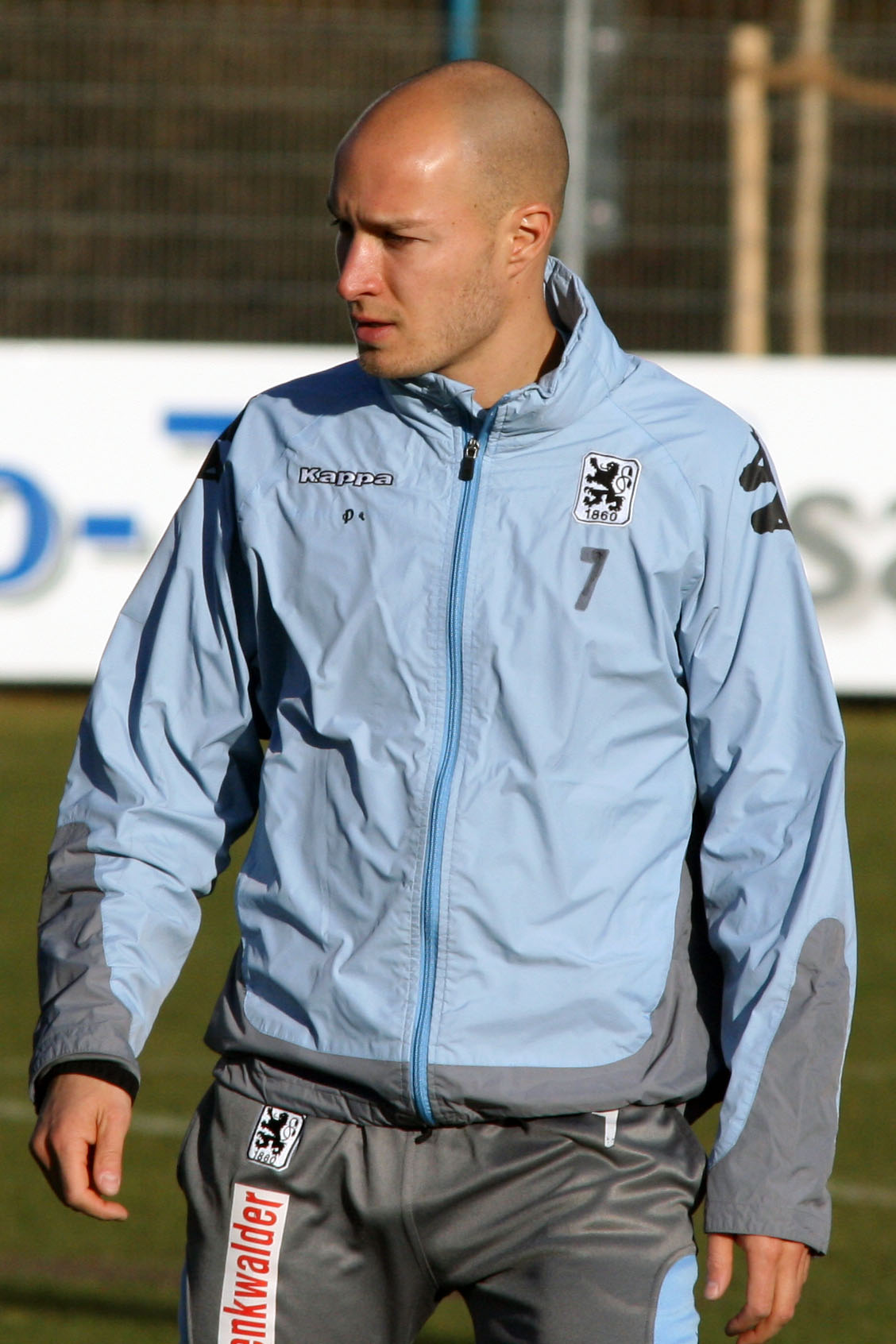
- Vučićević with TSV 1860 Munich in 2007

Personal information
- Full name: Nemanja Vučićević
- Date of birth: 11 August 1979 (age 47)
- Place of birth: Belgrade, SFR Yugoslavia
- Height: 1.81 m (5 ft 11 in)
- Position: Attacking midfielder

Youth career
- Rad

Senior career*
Years	Team	Apps	(Gls)
1999–2000	Grafičar Beograd		
2000–2001	OFK Beograd	28	(6)
2001–2003	Lokomotiv Moscow	16	(0)
2003–2004	OFK Beograd	25	(3)
2005–2007	1860 Munich	48	(12)
2007–2009	1. FC Köln	53	(2)
2009–2010	Hapoel Tel Aviv	9	(3)
2010–2011	Kavala	23	(2)
2011–2012	Anorthosis	9	(0)
2012	Manisaspor	9	(2)
2012–2013	FC Tokyo	29	(9)
2015	PSM Makassar	1	(1)

International career
2000–2001	FR Yugoslavia U21	6	(0)
- * Club domestic league appearances and goals

Nemanja Vučićević (Serbian Cyrillic: Немања Вучићевић, pronounced [němaɲa ʋutʃǐːtɕeʋitɕ]; born 11 August 1979) is a Serbian retired footballer who played as an attacking midfielder.

During his journeyman career, Vučićević represented numerous clubs in his country and abroad, spending the most time at TSV 1860 Munich and 1. FC Köln. He also played for OFK Beograd, Lokomotiv Moscow and Hapoel Tel Aviv.

== Career statistics ==
Club	Season	League			National Cup		League Cup		Continental		Total	
Club	Season	Division	Apps	Goals	Apps	Goals	Apps	Goals	Apps	Goals	Apps	Goals
OFK Beograd	2000–01	First League of FR Yugoslavia	28	6	1	0	—		—		29	6
Lokomotiv Moscow	2001	Russian Premier League	3	0	1	0	—		3	0	7	0
Lokomotiv Moscow	2002	Russian Premier League	9	0	1	0	—		2	0	12	0
Lokomotiv Moscow	2003	Russian Premier League	4	0	0	0	2	0	0	0	6	0
OFK Beograd	2003–04	First League	25	3	3	2	—		0	0	28	5
1860 Munich	2004–05	2. Bundesliga	10	1	0	0	—		—		10	1
1860 Munich	2005–06	2. Bundesliga	10	2	2	1	—		—		12	3
1860 Munich	2006–07	2. Bundesliga	28	9	1	0	—		—		29	9
1. FC Köln	2007–08	2. Bundesliga	24	1	1	1	—		0	0	25	2
1. FC Köln	2008–09	Bundesliga	29	1	1	0	—		0	0	30	1
Hapoel Tel Aviv	2009–10	Israeli Premier League	9	3			1	0	5	1	15	4
Kavala	2010–11	Super League Greece	23	2	2	0	—		—		25	2
Anorthosis	2011–12	Cypriot First Division	9	0			—		4	1	13	1
Manisaspor	2011–12	Süper Lig	9	2	0	0	—		—		9	2
FC Tokyo	2012	J.League Division 1	13	6	1	0	2	0	0	0	16	6
FC Tokyo	2013	J.League Division 1	16	3	2	0	3	0	0	0	21	3
Career total			249	39	16	4	8	0	14	2	287	45
