= Zacharias Theodorou =

Cypriot footballer (born 1993)

Personal information
- Full name: Zacharias Theodorou
- Date of birth: July 7, 1993 (age 33)
- Place of birth: Larnaca, Cyprus
- Position: Central midfielder

Team information
- Current team: PO Xylotymbou

Youth career
- 2009–2011: Anorthosis Famagusta

Senior career*
Years	Team	Apps	(Gls)
2011–2016	Anorthosis Famagusta	15	(0)
2012–2013	→ Ayia Napa (loan)	16	(0)
2014–2015	→ Ayia Napa (loan)	18	(1)
2016–2017	Ayia Napa	23	(4)
2017–2018	Ermis Aradippou	11	(0)
2018–2019	Nea Salamina	0	(0)
2019	Onisilos Sotira	10	(3)
2019–	PO Xylotymbou		

International career
2011–2012	Cyprus U19	6	(1)
2012–	Cyprus U21	1	(0)
- * Club domestic league appearances and goals as of 16:42, 31 May 2019 (UTC)

Zacharias Theodorou (Greek: Ζαχαρίας Θεοδώρου; born July 7, 1993, in Larnaca) is a Cypriot football central midfielder for PO Xylotymbou.

He played for the Cyprus UEFA European Under-19.

== Career ==
=== Anorthosis Famagusta FC ===
==== Season 2011-12 ====
Zacharias Theodorou signed a professional contract with Anorthosis in September 2011 until 2016. At the same season Theodorou played in 2 games for the Championship against Alki and Ethnikos Achna both match as a substitution for only 4 minutes. Theodorou played for all 3 matches of Anorthosis Famagusta in cup and he score his first goal with Anorthosis shirt against PAEEK FC on Anorthosis Victory 6–0.

=== Ayia Napa FC ===
==== Season 2012-13 ====
The 19year-old international with Cyprus U21 made a good season with Ayia Napa. He was given many chances after he played in 12 matches in the starting lineup and other 4 as a substitution with a total participation time 1,155 minutes in the championship.

=== PO Xylotymbou ===
On 21 June 2019, Theodorou joined PO Xylotymbou.
