= Matúš Kozáčik =

Slovak footballer

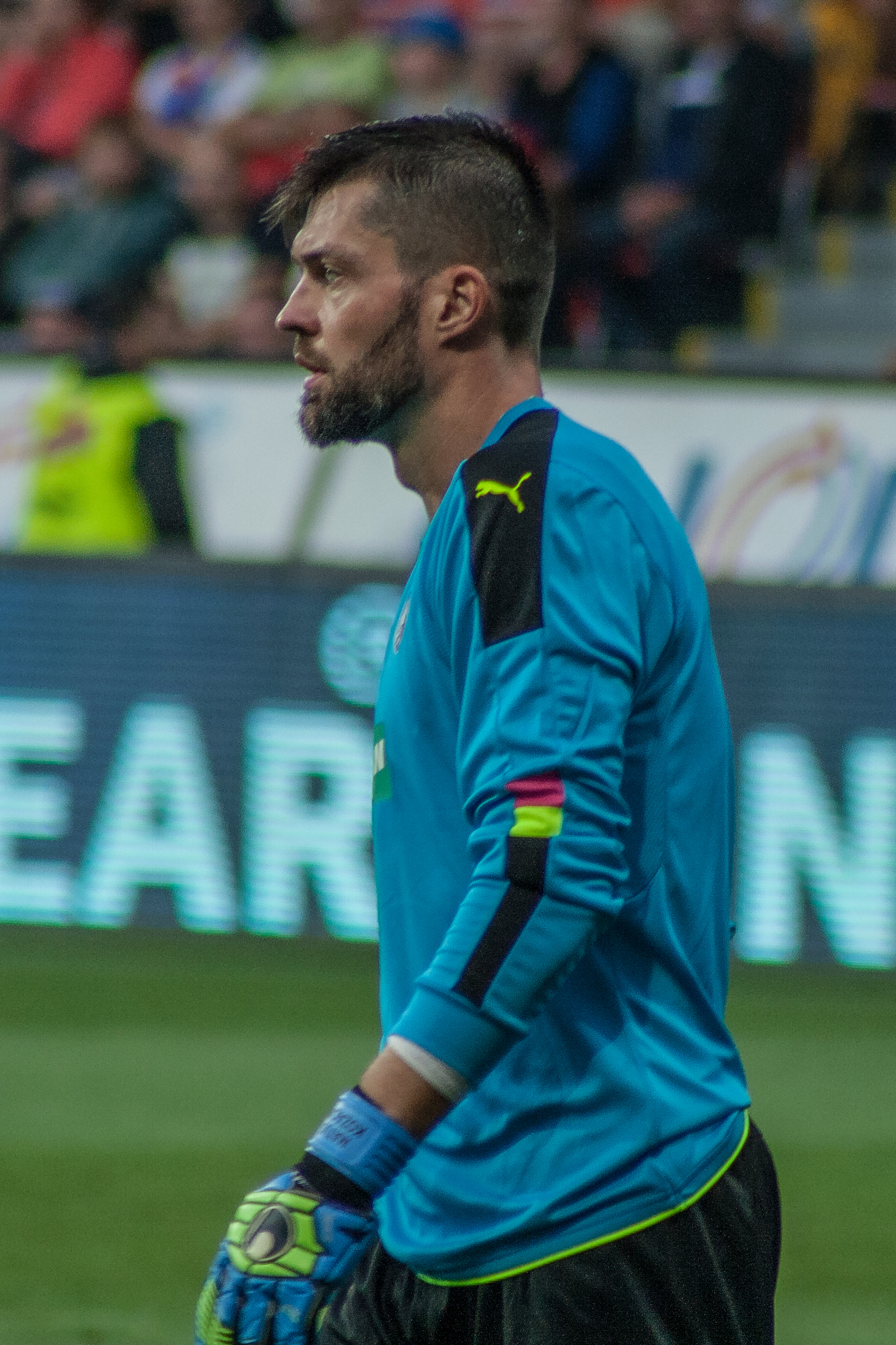

Personal information
- Full name: Matúš Kozáčik
- Date of birth: 27 December 1983 (age 42)
- Place of birth: Dolný Kubín, Czechoslovakia
- Height: 1.93 m (6 ft 4 in)
- Position: Goalkeeper

Team information
- Current team: Viktoria Plzeň (goalkeeping coach)

Youth career
- 1994–1998: Dolný Kubín
- 1998–2000: 1. FC Košice

Senior career*
Years	Team	Apps	(Gls)
2000–2002	1. FC Košice	0	(0)
2002–2007	Slavia Prague	55	(0)
2007–2010	Sparta Prague	17	(0)
2010–2012	Anorthosis Famagusta	51	(0)
2012–2019	Viktoria Plzeň	171	(0)

International career
2006–2019	Slovakia	29	(0)

Managerial career
- 2020–: Viktoria Plzeň (goalkeeping coach)
- 2022: Slovakia (goalkeeping coach)
- * Club domestic league appearances and goals

Matúš Kozáčik (Slovak pronunciation: [ˈmatuːʂ ˈkɔzaːtʂik]; born 27 December 1983) is a Slovak former football goalkeeper who played for Czech club Viktoria Plzeň, and who now serves as a goalkeeping coach with the club's first team.

== Club career ==
Kozáčik joined Czech side Slavia Prague from Slovak team 1. FC Košice in January 2002, after a successful week-long trial. While Kozáčik was playing for Slavia Prague, Leeds United took him on trial in December 2006. He became the third player to transfer directly between the rivals of the Prague derby when he joined Sparta Prague in July 2007, signing a three-year contract.

He started the 2011–12 season as Anorthosis Famagusta's first-choice goalkeeper for the club's European matches, but lost his position to other club goalkeeper Dimitar Ivankov for the next two matches. Ivankov left the club after two matches and Kozáčik continued as first-choice goalkeeper.

In June 2012, Kozáčik signed a three-year contract with Viktoria Plzeň. In February 2014, he extended his contract with Plzeň until June 2017. On 18 December 2019, Kozáčik announced his retirement from professional football at the age of 35.

== International career ==
On 10 December 2006, Kozáčik made his debut for Slovakia when he played in the first half of a friendly match against the United Arab Emirates. However, his next game for the national team came almost seven years later when he started in a 2014 FIFA World Cup qualifier against Latvia in 2013.

Kozáčik played 90 minutes of a controversial friendly match against Denmark, who arrived with a squad of lower division players and futsal internationals. During a 2019 friendly match against Jordan which ended in a 5-1 victory, Kozáčik was replaced by international debutant Dominik Greif at half time, with the score 0–1. Slovakia went on to win the game with five second-half goals.

== Coaching career ==
In September 2022, Kozáčík took on the role of goalkeeping coach with the Slovakia national football team under Francesco Calzona. In March 2023, Kozáčik was replaced by his former national team co-goalkeeper and KFC Komárno goalkeeping coach Ján Novota, with Novota already filling-in during the extraordinary December 2022 camp.

== Career statistics ==
Club	Season	Appearances		
Club	Season	League	Europe	Cup
1. FC Košice	2000–01	0	0	0
1. FC Košice	2001–02	0	0	0
Slavia Prague	2002–03	0	0	0
Slavia Prague	2003–04	1	3	0
Slavia Prague	2004–05	14	0	0
Slavia Prague	2005–06	16	8	0
Slavia Prague	2006–07	16	2	0
Sparta Prague	2007–08	0	0	0
Sparta Prague	2008–09	9	6	0
Sparta Prague	2009–10	7	1	2
Anorthosis F.C.	2010–11	20	5	5
Anorthosis F.C.	2011–12	30	2	2
Viktoria Plzeň	2012–13	27	12	1
Viktoria Plzeň	2013–14	27	13	3
Viktoria Plzeň	2014–15	29	2	1
Viktoria Plzeň	2015–16	27	8	1
Viktoria Plzeň	2016–17	26	9	0
Viktoria Plzeň	2017–18	24	0	0
Viktoria Plzeň	2018–19	10	2	0
Career totals		274	58	15
