= Georgios Makris =

Greek footballer (born 1984)

Giorgos Makris
Personal information
- Full name: Georgios Makris
- Date of birth: 15 November 1984 (age 41)
- Place of birth: Kavala, Greece
- Height: 1.86 m (6 ft 1 in)
- Position: Midfielder

Youth career
- 2001–2003: Galaxias Kavalas

Senior career*
Years	Team	Apps	(Gls)
2002–2004	PAOK	2	(0)
2004–2005	Agrotikos Asteras	16	(0)
2005–2007	Pierikos	14	(1)
2007–2008	Olympiacos Volos	7	(0)
2008–2010	Pierikos	24	(0)
2010–2011	Kerkyra	10	(0)
2011–2013	Atromitos	7	(0)
2012	→ Anorthosis (loan)	2	(0)
2013–2015	OFI	66	(7)
2015	Iraklis	6	(0)
2016–2017	Pisa	10	(2)
2017–2018	Karaiskakis	29	(4)
2018–2019	Doxa Drama	29	(1)
2019–2021	Pierikos	15	(1)
Total		237	(16)
- * Club domestic league appearances and goals as of 26 October 2025

Georgios Makris (Greek: Γεώργιος Μακρής, born 15 November 1984) is a Greek former professional footballer, who played as a midfielder.

== Club career ==
Makris started his playing career with PAOK. On 6 July 2010, he signed an annual contract with Kerkyra. In May 2011 he signed for Atromitos. On 28 January 2012, Makris was loaned out to Anorthosis Famagusta of the Cypriot First Division. He was released from Atromitos in December 2012. Shortly afterwards, in January 2013, he signed for OFI. He left OFI in January 2015, due to the club's financial difficulties. On 24 July 2015, Makris signed an annual contract with Super League Greece side Iraklis. After being released by Iraklis in late 2015, he signed a 1,5 years' contract with Italian Lega Pro club Pisa. On 12 June 2016 Pisa gained promotion to Serie B after seven years by defeating Maceratese (3–1), Pordenone (3–0 on aggregate) and Foggia in the two-legged play-off final (5–3 on aggregate), while Makris had a substantial contribution.

== Honours ==
=== Club ===
PAOK

- Greek Cup: 2002–03
