= Dedé (footballer, born 1981) =

Angolan footballer

Personal information
- Full name: Adérito Waldemar Alves Carvalho
- Date of birth: 4 July 1981 (age 45)
- Place of birth: Lobito, Angola
- Height: 1.85 m (6 ft 1 in)
- Position: Midfielder

Senior career*
Years	Team	Apps	(Gls)
2001–2003	Académica Lobito	35	(8)
2003–2005	O Elvas	33	(4)
2005–2006	Portosantense	24	(1)
2006–2007	Trofense	28	(4)
2007–2009	Paços Ferreira	46	(2)
2009	Arles-Avignon	4	(0)
2010	Politehnica Timişoara	3	(0)
2010–2011	Olympiakos Nicosia	25	(2)
2011–2014	AEL Limassol	74	(4)
2014–2015	Benfica Luanda	13	(0)
Total		285	(25)

International career
2007–2013	Angola	27	(0)
- * Club domestic league appearances and goals

Adérito Waldemar Alves Carvalho (born 4 July 1981), commonly known as Dedé, is an Angolan former professional footballer who played as a midfielder.

== Club career ==
Dedé was born in Lobito, Angola. After starting in his native country with Académica Petróleos do Lobito, Dedé moved to Portugal, first appearing with lowly O Elvas C.A.D. and C.D. Portosantense. In the 2006–07 season he joined C.D. Trofense in the second division, being an important first-team member.

Dedé signed with F.C. Paços de Ferreira for 2007–08, scoring in his debut in the Primeira Liga on 18 August 2007 after heading home in a 1–3 away loss against C.S. Marítimo. It was his only goal during the campaign.

In the summer of 2009, Dedé signed for AC Arles-Avignon in the French Ligue 2, but left the club only a few months later and moved to Romania with FC Timişoara. He make his official debut for the latter on 25 April 2010, at FC Steaua București.

Dedé joined his third team in less than one year in the 2010 off-season, Cyprus' Olympiakos Nicosia. He continued competing in the country in the following years, with AEL Limassol.

== International career ==
Dedé first represented Angola in 2007, being summoned for the following year's Africa Cup of Nations as the national side progressed through the group stages.
