= Silvio González =

Argentine footballer

Silvio Augusto González
Personal information
- Full name: Silvio Augusto González
- Date of birth: June 8, 1980 (age 46)
- Place of birth: Guernica, Argentina
- Height: 1.80 m (5 ft 11 in)
- Position: Striker

Team information
- Current team: AEZ Zakakiou
- Number: 9

Senior career*
Years	Team	Apps	(Gls)
1997–1998	Lanús	8	(2)
1998–1999	Arsenal Sarandí	35	(15)
1999–2002	Lanús	50	(18)
2002–2003	Arsenal Sarandí	37	(14)
2003	San Lorenzo	1	(1)
2003–2004	Córdoba	47	(19)
2005	Numancia	3	(4)
2005–2006	Arsenal Sarandí	25	(12)
2006–2007	Banfield	13	(9)
2007	Olympiakos Nicosia	13	(9)
2008–2011	AEL Limassol	52	(17)
2011–2012	Aris Limassol	25	(7)
2012	Tigre	6	(5)
2013	Patriotas	8	(8)
2013–2014	Santa Fe	21	(9)
2014	Águilas Doradas	6	(3)
2015–2017	Aris Limassol	41	(8)
2017–	AEZ Zakakiou	65	(36)
- * Club domestic league appearances and goals as of 22:16, 19 May 2019 (UTC)

Silvio Augusto González (born 8 June 1980) is an Argentine football player who last played for AEZ Zakakiou in the Cypriot Second Division. He is nicknamed Pulpo, which means "octopus" in Spanish.

González started his career with Argentinian football club Club Atlético Lanús. In Cyprus, he was one of the most admired players in AEL Limassol and played in the All-Star game during the period 2008–2009. He scored many goals and played many matches, including the Cypriot final for AEL Limassol. Gonzalez scored five goals in the cup and four goals in the league.
