= Matías Degra =

Argentine footballer

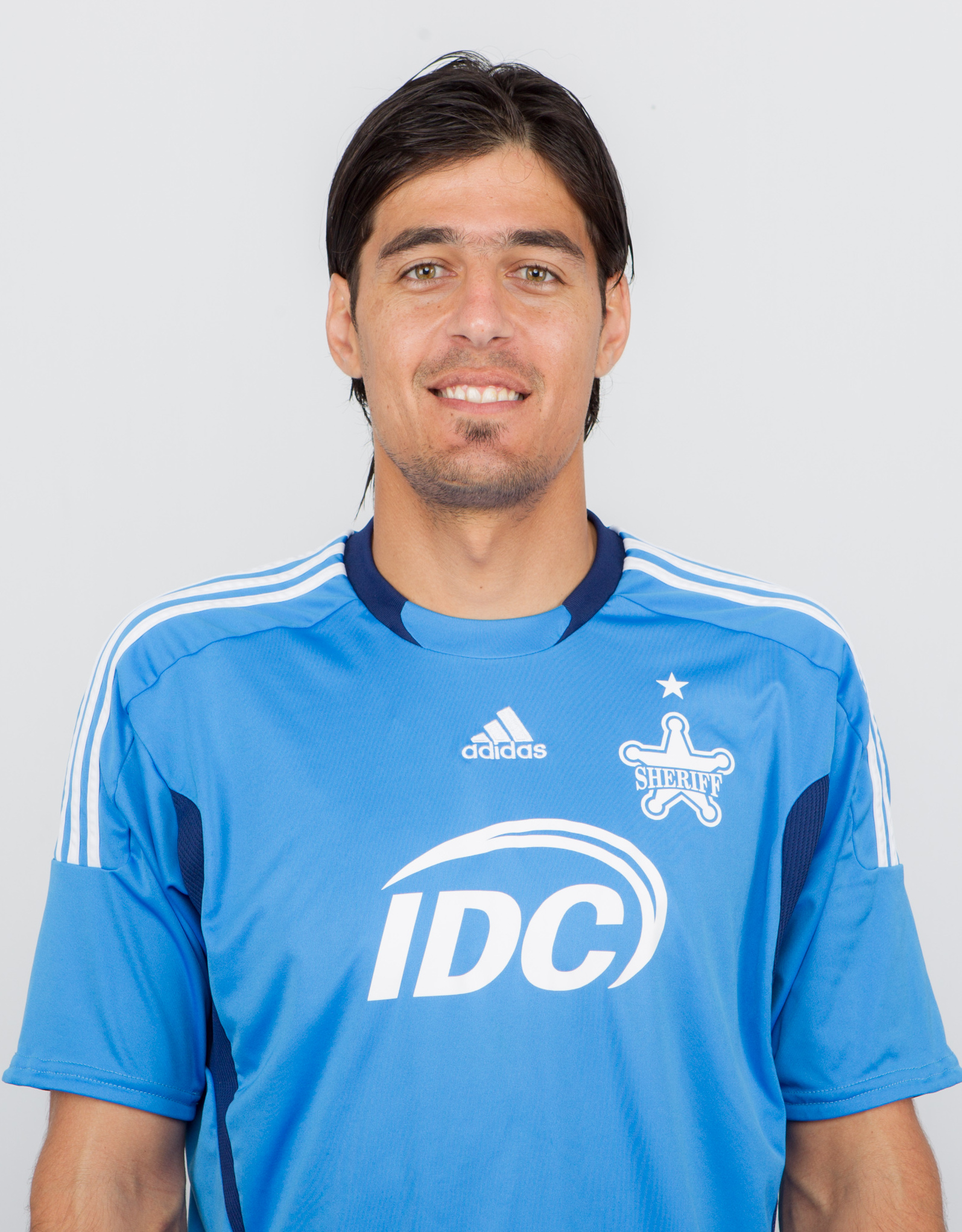

Personal information
- Date of birth: June 18, 1983 (age 43)
- Place of birth: Santa fe, Argentina
- Height: 1.91 m (6 ft 3 in)
- Position: Goalkeeper

Youth career
- –2004: Talleres de Córdoba

Senior career*
Years	Team	Apps	(Gls)
2004–2005	Talleres de Córdoba	20	(0)
2005–2007	9 de Julio	40	(0)
2008	Apollon Kalamarias	1	(0)
2008–2009	Veria	11	(0)
2009–2011	Asteras Tripolis	39	(0)
2011–2013	AEL Limassol	59	(0)
2013–2014	Paços Ferreira	21	(0)
2014–2015	Sheriff Tiraspol	4	(0)
2015–2016	AEL Limassol	23	(0)
2016	AEL	1	(0)
2017–2018	Deportivo Pereira	34	(0)
2018–2020	Alvarado	38	(0)
- * Club domestic league appearances and goals as of 21:09, 15 September 2019 (UTC)

Matias Omar Degra (born June 18, 1983) is an Argentine football player as a goalkeeper.

== Club career ==
=== Asteras Tripolis ===
In 2009 Asteras Tripolis signed Degra from Veria (2nd Division) and became the first choice goalkeeper of the team.

=== AEL Limassol ===
In 2011, he signed for AEL Limassol, helping the team to win the Cypriot First Division. He had the amazing record of saving 7 consecutive penalties in a whole year, helping the team have the best defensive record in the league. The next season started very well for Matias Degra and he participated in the group stages of the UEFA Europa League. At the end of the season, after his team lost in the Cypriot cup final, Degra did not renew his contract with AEL.

=== Paços Ferreira ===
In June 2013, he moved to Portugal and signed a contract with Paços Ferreira.

=== Sheriff Tiraspol ===
In June 2014, he signed a contract with Moldovan side Sheriff Tiraspol.

=== AEL ===
In July 2016, he signed a contract with Greek team AEL (unaffiliated with AEL Cyprus). He made his debut on a friendly match against A.O.Kerkyra. On 12 September 2016, he made his official debut in a league match against Iraklis (2-2). This was meant to be his last appearance in the club. After the game ended he had a very serious confrontation with the team's major shareholder Alexis Kougias at the entrance of the locker rooms. Kougias blamed him for having unprofessional behavior and poor performance. Also he claimed to have full responsibility for the second goal the team conceded, when he tried to dribble past 2 opponents, he lost the ball and the other team scored in an empty goal. Photos published later show Kougias hit Degra in the face. Hours later he solved his contract and left the club by mutual agreement.

== Honours ==
- AEL Limassol
  - Cypriot First Division: 2011–12
  - Moldova Cup : 2015
  - Cypriot Super Cup: 2015
