= Aleš Chvalovský =

Czech footballer (born 1979)

Personal information
- Full name: Aleš Chvalovský
- Date of birth: 29 May 1979 (age 47)
- Place of birth: Czechoslovakia
- Height: 1.90 m (6 ft 3 in)
- Position: Goalkeeper

Youth career
- 1990–1992: Chmel Blšany
- 1992–1993: Dukla Prague
- 1993–1994: SK Rakovník
- 1994–1995: Slavia Prague
- 1995–1997: Liverpool
- 1997–1998: Marine

Senior career*
Years	Team	Apps	(Gls)
1998–2000	Chmel Blšany	45	(0)
2000–2001	VfB Stuttgart II	13	(0)
2001–2005	Chmel Blšany	110	(0)
2005–2012	Apollon Limassol	136	(0)
Total		304	

International career
1999–2000	Czech Republic U-21	13	(0)
2000	Czech Republic U-23	1	(0)
Medal record
Men's football
Representing Czech Republic
UEFA European Under-21 Championship
Winner	2002 Switzerland
- * Club domestic league appearances and goals

Aleš Chvalovský (born 29 May 1979) is a Czech former professional football goalkeeper who played more than 150 matches in the Czech First League.

== Career ==
Aleš Chvalovský played in his youth for Chmel Blšany, Dukla Prague, SK Rakovník, Slavia Prague, Liverpool F.C., Marine F.C. and again for Chmel Blšany. He made his Czech First League debut in the 1998–99 season for Chmel Blšany. After the 1999–2000 season, he was signed by German side VfB Stuttgart but played only for the B team. After only half a year Chvalovský returned in January 2001 to Blšany, where he again became the first-choice goalkeeper.

In 2005, Chvalovský was signed by the Cypriot club Apollon Limassol. During his first year in Cyprus he had a great season; his team won the championship unbeaten in Cyprus and he was voted player of the year in Cyprus for the 2005–06 season.

== Personal life ==
Chvalovský is the son of the president of many years of the Football Association of the Czech Republic František Chvalovský, who likewise played as a goalkeeper in Blšany.

== Honours ==
Chvalovský in 2000 became European runner-up with the Czech Republic U-21 national football team in Slovakia and also played at the 2000 Olympic Games in Sydney. He was part of the Czech U-21 squad which won the 2002 UEFA European Under-21 Championship, although he was reserve goalkeeper in the tournament.
