= Civard Sprockel =

Dutch footballer (born 1983)

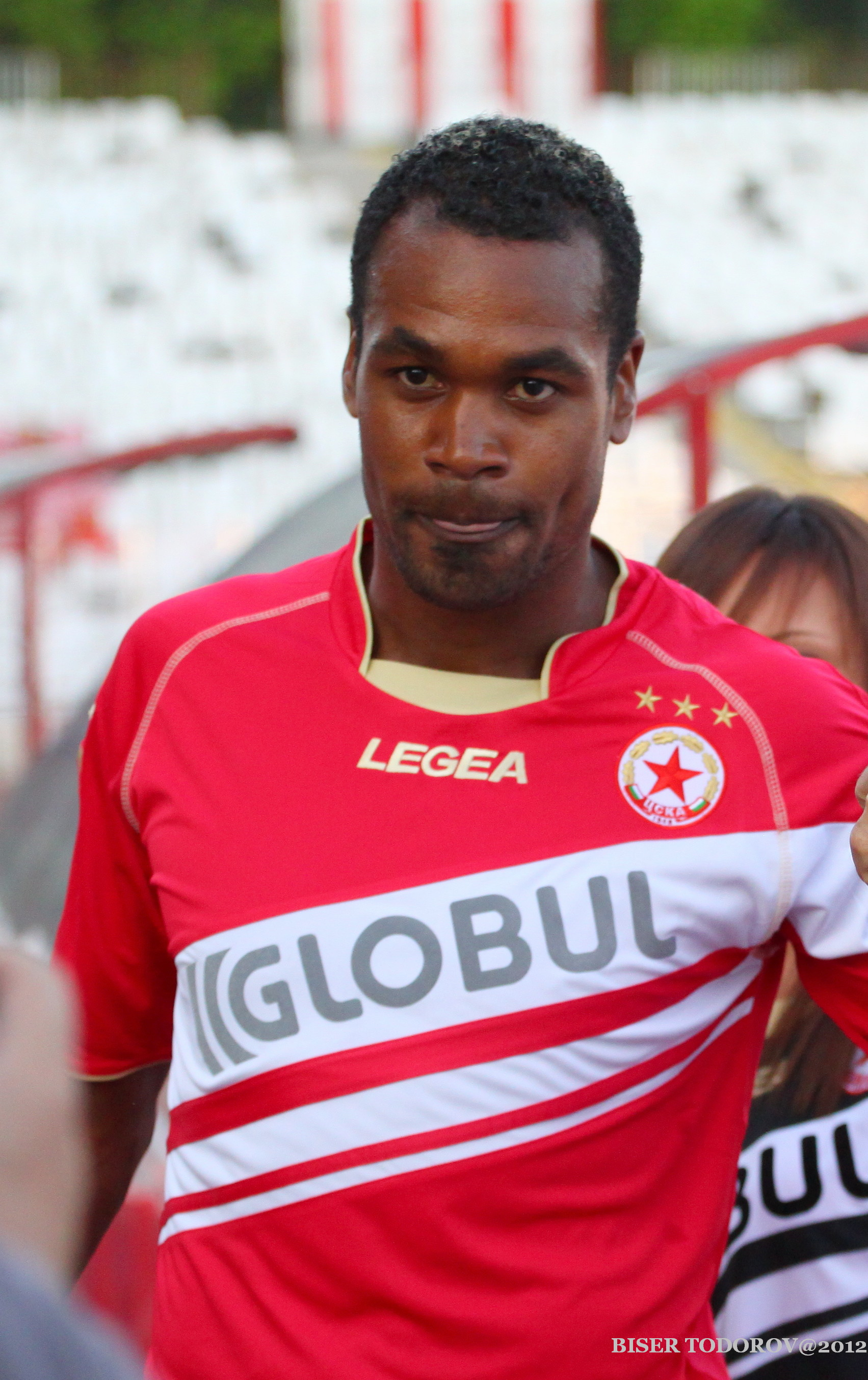
- Sprockel in 2012, in the colours of CSKA

Personal information
- Full name: Civard Sprockel
- Date of birth: 10 May 1983 (age 43)
- Place of birth: Willemstad, Curaçao
- Height: 1.82 m (6 ft 0 in)
- Position: Centre-back

Team information
- Current team: RKHVV

Youth career
- LENS
- DVO
- Feyenoord

Senior career*
Years	Team	Apps	(Gls)
2001–2003	Feyenoord	6	(0)
2002–2003	→ Excelsior (loan)	13	(0)
2003–2006	Excelsior	96	(1)
2006–2011	Vitesse Arnhem	132	(4)
2011–2012	Anorthosis	40	(0)
2012	CSKA Sofia	0	(0)
2013–2014	Botev Plovdiv	42	(0)
2015–2015	Othellos	10	(0)
2015–2016	Notts County	5	(0)
2016–2017	FC Eindhoven	26	(1)
2017–2019	DUNO	2	(0)
2019–	RKHVV	1	(0)

International career
2000–2002	Netherlands U19	10	(1)
2001–2002	Netherlands U20	8	(0)
2002–2004	Netherlands U21	4	(0)
- * Club domestic league appearances and goals as of 30 January 2021 (UTC)

Civard Sprockel (born 10 May 1983) is a Dutch footballer who plays for RKHVV.

== Career ==
He formerly played for Feyenoord, Excelsior, Vitesse Arnhem, Cyprus Anorthosis Famagusta and Bulgarian CSKA Sofia and was a member of the Dutch team at the 2001 FIFA World Youth Championship.

Sprockel made his debut for Notts County on 8 August 2015 in the first match of the 2015–16 season, a 2–0 victory at Stevenage, but was substituted at half-time due to injury.

He has since played on amateur level in the Netherlands for VV DUNO and RKHVV.
