= Petrolina (company) =

Oil Company

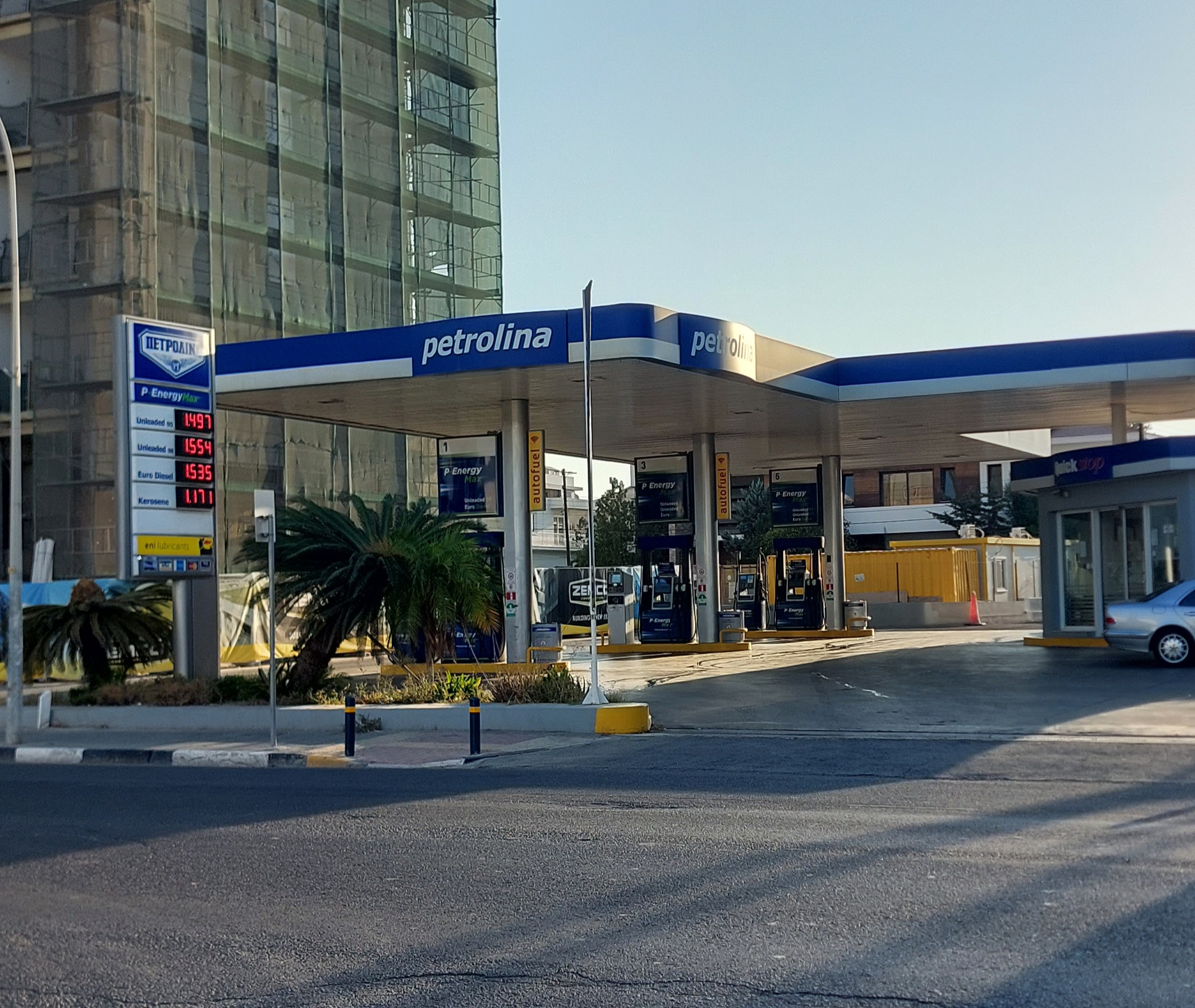
- Petrolina station in Larnaca, Cyprus
- Type: Public
- Industry: Oil and gas industry
- Founded: 1959
- Headquarters: Larnaca, Cyprus
- Products: Fuels lubricants
- Revenue: €228,983,493
- Website: www.petrolina.com.cy

Petrolina (Holdings) Public Limited is the largest Cypriot oil company dealing in a wide range of petroleum operations.

It is based in Larnaca. As of 2017, it had a nationwide retail network of 100 gas stations. It supplies and markets motor, industrial, domestic, marine and aviation fuels.

== History ==
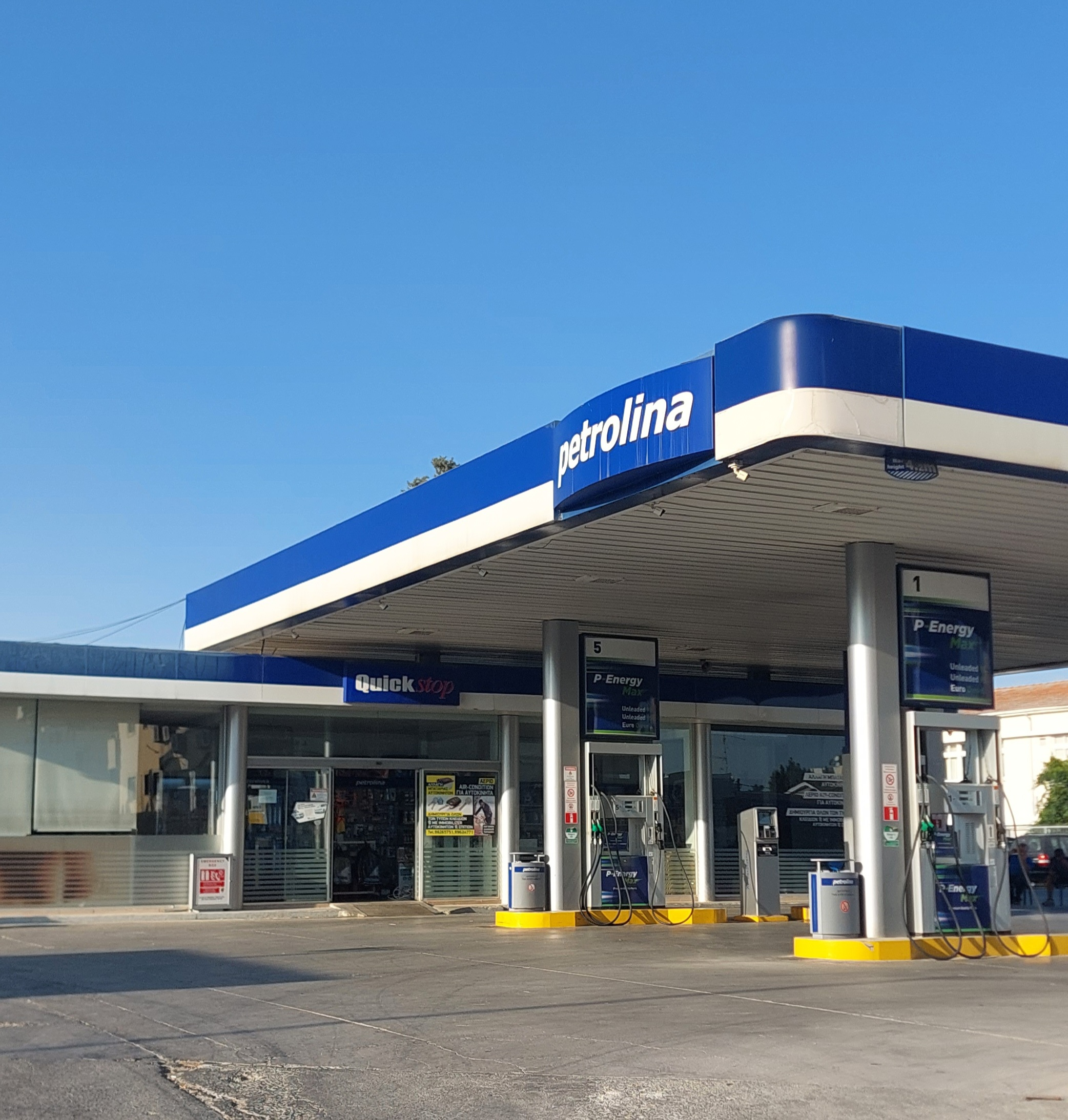
Petrolina service station in Larnaca.

Petrolina was established in 1959 by Nikos, Takis, Kallis, Kikis and Nakis Lefkaritis. It was the first Cypriot oil company.

Petrolina went public in December 2000 listing on the Cyprus Stock Exchange.

In 2003, the company bought out Total Aviation with its two storage tanks in Vasilikos and started the process of moving its fuel terminals from Larnaca to Vasilikos (the process should be completed in 2021).

In 2018, the turnover was €394.2 mln (up from €391.5 mln in 2017) and after-tax profits rose from €4.2 mln in 2017 to €4.3 mln.

The company’s founder Kikis Lefkaritis died on November 30, 2020.

== See also ==
- Cyprus Stock Exchange
