= Janício Martins =

Cape Verdean footballer (born 1979)

Janício
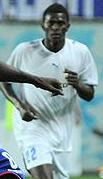
- Janício in action for Anorthosis in 2010

Personal information
- Full name: Janício de Jesus Gomes Martins
- Date of birth: 30 November 1979 (age 46)
- Place of birth: Tarrafal, Cape Verde
- Height: 1.83 m (6 ft 0 in)
- Position: Right back

Senior career*
| Years | Team | Apps | (Gls) |
| 1997–2001 | Barcelona Tarrafal | | |
| 2001–2002 | Estrela Amadora | 0 | (0) |
| 2002–2005 | Torreense | 81 | (3) |
| 2005–2009 | Vitória Setúbal | 117 | (0) |
| 2009–2012 | Anorthosis | 74 | (1) |
| 2013–2014 | Covilhã | 11 | (0) |
| 2015–2017 | Pinhalnovense | 52 | (0) |
| Total | | 335 | (4) |

International career
| 2004–2008 | Cape Verde | 16 | (1) |
- * Club domestic league appearances and goals

Janício de Jesus Gomes Martins (born 30 November 1979), known simply as Janício, is a Cape Verdean retired professional footballer who played as a right-back.

== Club career ==
Born in Tarrafal, Janício started playing football for local Club Desportivo Amabox Barcelona Tarrafal, moving in 2001 to Portugal with C.F. Estrela da Amadora but failing to make any official appearances for the second division club. He continued playing in the country in the following three seasons, representing S.C.U. Torreense in the third level.

In the 2005–06 campaign, Janício moved straight into the Primeira Liga with Vitória de Setúbal, appearing in 32 games in his first year as the side – who at one point ranked as the team with the fewest goals conceded in the major European leagues – finished in eighth position, amidst serious financial problems. In his third season he played 37 official matches (3,214 minutes of action), helping the Sadinos to win the inaugural Portuguese League Cup.

In the summer of 2009, Janício signed a two-year contract with Anorthosis Famagusta FC of the Cypriot First Division.

== Honours ==
Vitória de Setúbal

- Taça da Liga: 2007–08
