= Evandro Roncatto =

Brazilian footballer (born 1986)

Personal information
- Full name: Evandro Roncatto
- Date of birth: 24 May 1986 (age 40)
- Place of birth: Campinas, Brazil
- Height: 1.82 m (5 ft 11 1/2 in)
- Positions: Winger; forward

Team information
- Current team: Oliveira do Hospital (sporting director)

Youth career
- –2003: Guarani

Senior career*
Years	Team	Apps	(Gls)
2003–2005	Guarani		
2006	Santo André		
2006	Náutico		
2006	Paysandu		
2007	Ipatinga		
2007–2009	Belenenses	51	(5)
2009–2010	Paços de Ferreira	7	(0)
2010–2011	Ermis Aradippou	38	(7)
2011–2013	Anorthosis Famagusta	43	(5)
2013	Beroe Stara Zagora	10	(0)
2014	Niki Volos	18	(0)
2014–2015	Oriental Lisboa	37	(5)
2015	Irtysh	11	(5)
2016	Rio Branco	11	(4)
2016	Raufoss	4	(0)
2017	Cascavel	3	(0)
2017–2018	Kalamata	0	(0)
2018–2020	Casa Pia	41	(1)
2020	Montijo	7	(0)
2020–2021	Oriental Lisboa	7	(0)
2021	Pinhalnovense	7	(0)

International career
2003	Brazil U-17		

Managerial career
- 2021: Pinhalnovense (sporting director)
- 2023–: Oliveira do Hospital (sporting director)
- * Club domestic league appearances and goals

Evandro Roncatto (born 24 May 1986 in Campinas, São Paulo) is a retired Brazilian footballer who played as a forward and current sporting director of Oliveira do Hospital.

Earlier, he played for Cypriot side Anorthosis Famagusta FC and Beroe Stara Zagora in Bulgaria. Roncatto is of Italian descent, and has played for Portuguese clubs like Paços de Ferreira and Belenenses.

Roncatto is a former Brazilian youth international.

== Club career ==
Roncatto started his career in his home country, Brazil. He started at Guarani, where he grew out to be a Brazilian U-17 player. He was signed by Sport Club do Recife in 2006, and made his way to Europe in 2007, to play for Os Belenenses in Portugal. Here, he struggled with the high expectations of being a prominent youth international, and was finally signed by Paços de Ferreira, where he never really impressed. Roncatto joined Ermis Aradippou in 2010. Then in the following year he moved to Anorthosis Famagusta. Roncatto played in the A PFG as part of the Beroe Stara Zagora team between 30 July and late November 2013, mostly featuring as a substitute.

== International career ==
During 2003, he won the FIFA U-17 World Championship with Brazil and was also a runner-up in the South American U-17 Championship.

== Later career ==
In 2021, after ending his career, Roncatto worked as a sporting director at Pinhalnovense.

In 2023, Roncatto joined Oliveira do Hospital as a sporting director.

== Honours ==
=== National team ===
==== Brazil U17 ====
- FIFA U-17 World Cup:
  - Champion: 2003
- South American Under-17 Football Championship :
  - Runner-up: 2003
