= 2013–14 Anorthosis Famagusta FC season =

Anorthosis Famagusta
2013–14 season
- Chairman: Savvas Kakos
- Manager: Christos Kassianos; Nikos Nicolaou
- Stadium: Antonis Papadopoulos Stadium
- Cypriot Cup: 2nd Round
- Europa League: Second qualifying round
- Top goalscorer: League: Roberto Colautti (8 Goals); All: Roberto Colautti (10 Goals)
- Highest home attendance: 8,500 (15 September 2013 against Apollon Limassol)
- Lowest home attendance: 11 (25 July 2013 against Gefle)
Home colours	Away colours

The 2013–14 season will be Anorthosis' 65th consecutive season in the Cypriot First Division, the top division of Cyprus football. It covers a period from 1 July 2013 to 30 May 2014.

Anorthosis Famagusta began the season in second qualifying round of Europa League and faced the team Fair Play, Gefle In the first leg in the closed door Antonis Papadopoulos Stadium, Anorthosis defeat the Swedish club 3−0 by a goal of García and two of Colautti. In the second leg Anorthosis defeated 4−0 in Sweden and eliminated from the competition prematurely.

== Season overview ==
=== Pre-season ===
Anorthosis Famagusta commenced their summer transfer activity on 18 May, by selling Ricardo Laborde to FC Krasnodar for €1.2 million + 25% of player resale.

On 5 June, Anorthosis announced its first signing of the season by signing Ivorian winger, Gaossou Fofana from Doxa Katokopias F.C. for a year loan, with option to purchase the player.

On 7 June, Anorthosis announced the re signing of Christos Marangos from AEK Larnaca until 2015.

On 21 June, Anorthosis announced the signing of Georgian national football player Shota Grigalashvili for 1+1 years.

On 25 June, Anorthosis announced the signing of Montenegro national football player Savo Pavicevic for 1+1 years.

On 28 June, Anorthosis announced the signing of Argentina Footballer national with the team of Israel Roberto Colautti for the next year

On 30 June, Anorthosis announced the signing of England-Cypriot national footballer of Cyprus Jason Demetriou for the next 3 years from AEK Larnaca.

On 5 July, Anorthosis announced the signing of Greece national football player Grigoris Makos for 2 years from 1860 Munich, Anorthosis will have 50% of the player rights and the rest will have player old team.

On 10 July, Anorthosis announced the signing of Israel national football player Amit Ben Shushan until 2014. also announced the sale of Jan Rezek to Changchun Yatai for €300k.

On 12 July, Anorthosis announced the signing of Gonzalo García from Maccabi Tel Aviv for a year loan.

On 29 July, team chairman Savvas Kakos and team stuff Christakis Kasianos and Nikos Nicolaou resigned from their positions in the club after the lose 4-0 by Gefle IF in Sweden.

On 17 August, Jorge Costa was officially announced as Anorthosis new coach for the next three seasons. He appeared for his first press conference in front of the media on 18 June.

On 28 August, Anorthosis announced the re signing of Toni Calvo for a year.

On 30 August, Anorthosis announces the consensual termination of cooperation with the Brazilian footballer Marcinho.

On 2 September, Anorthosis announced the signing of Argentine goalkeeper, Mario Daniel Vega for a season from River Plate.

== August 2013 ==
Anorthosis-Omonia: (3–1) On 31 August, With Roberto Colautti to score twice, Anorthosis took the first derby of the season, with rival Omonia, with a 3−1 victory in Antonis Papadopoulos Stadium. First win for Jorge Costa on the bench of Anorthosis. Originally Anorthosis opened the score with Jason Demetriou at 62' and take the victory with Colautti to score twice (94', 97'). In 85' Omonia just brought the game to equalize with Łukasz Gikiewicz.

== September 2013 ==
Anorthosis-Apollon: (3–1) On 15 September, With two heads of Roberto Colautti that reached the 4 goals in 2 games, Anorthosis made 2 wins 2 games in the league, and defeated Apollon 3−1. Roberto Colautti opened the score at 13' and Gonzalo García made the 2−0 with penalty at 30', Apollo lowered the score with Christos Karipidis at 58' and Roberto Colautti gave the victory to Anorthosis with header at 76'

Alki-Anorthosis: (0−4) On 22 September, Without struggle especially Anorthosis arrived in broad 4−0 win at GSZ Stadium with rival Alki after five opportunities scored four, with the unique opportunity that is not translated into goals to be after the fourth goal. One goal for Dan Alexa, Gaossou Fofana, Toni Calvo and Roberto Colautti with the Israel national footballer reached the 5 goals in 3 games.

== Current squad ==
Last Update: 8 November 2013

=== Squad information ===
N	Pos.	Nat.	Name	Age	EU	Since	App	Goals	Ends	Transfer fee	Notes
1	GK	(Argentina)	Mario Daniel Vega	42	EU	2013	3	0	2014	Free	
2	RB	(Slovenia)	Marko Andic (captain)	42	EU	2011	53	0	2014	Free	
3	CB	(Portugal)	Paulo Jorge	46	EU	2012	24	0	2014	Free	
4	DM	(Montenegro)	Savo Pavicević	45	EU	2013	9	0	2014	Free	
5	DM	(Romania)	Dan Alexa (captain)	47	EU	2012	30	4	2014	Free	
6	DM	(Cyprus)	Christos Marangos (captain)	43	EU	2013	88	13	2015	Free	
7	RM	(Spain)	Toni Calvo	39	EU	2012	27	5	2014	Free	Second nationality: Greece
9	SS	(Cyprus)	Giannis Okkas (captain)	49	EU	2009	183	79	2014	Free	
10	SS	(Georgia (country))	Shota Grigalashvili	40	EU	2013	8	1	2015	Free	
11	CF	(Israel)	Roberto Colautti	44	EU	2013	11	10	2015	Free	Second nationality: Argentina
16	GK	(France)	Mathieu Valverde	43	EU	2012	24	0	2014	Free	
17	CF	(Israel)	Amit Ben Shushan	41	EU	2013	4	0	2015	Free	
19	RB	(Uruguay)	Gonzalo García	43	EU	2013	6	3	2014	Free	Second nationality: Spain
20	RB	(Cyprus)	Jason Demetriou	38	EU	2013	6	1	2015	Free	Second nationality: England
21	CB	(Romania)	George Galamaz	45	EU	2013	7	0	2014	Free	
22	CB	(Cyprus)	Demetris Economou	34	EU	2012	1	0	2017	€150K	
23	LB	(Cyprus)	Valentinos Sielis	36	EU	2009	48	0	2017	Free	
26	RW	(Ivory Coast)	Gaossou Fofana	42	EU	2013	9	2	2014	Loan	Second nationality: France
30	LM	(Cyprus)	Andreas Avraam	39	EU	2013	12	0	2017	€300K	
32	GK	(Cyprus)	Gavriel Constantinou	37	EU	2008	3	0	2015	Youth system	
33	CM	(Cyprus)	Andreas Makris	30	EU	2013	0	0	2017	€20K	
35	CF	(Cyprus)	Panayiotis Loizides	31	EU	2012	0	0	2016	Youth system	
36	AM	(Cyprus)	Adamos Andreou	31	EU	2012	1	0	2016	Youth system	
37	AM	(Cyprus)	Zacharias Theodorou	33	EU	2011	3	0	2016	Youth system	
40	GK	(Albania)	Aldo Teqja	31	EU	2012	0	0	2016	Youth system	
41	CM	(Greece)	Grigoris Makos	39	EU	2013	9	0	2015	Free	
99	CM	(Israel)	Moshe Ohayon	43	EU	2012	22	1	2014	Free	Second nationality: France

- Last updated: 8 November 2013
- Source: Anorthosis.com/, Players transfer, Wikipedia players' articles (for player numbers, appearances, and goals)
- Ordered by squad number.

More Anorthosis Footballers

N	Pos.	Nat.	Name	Age	EU	Since	App	Goals	Ends	Transfer fee	Notes
18	CF	(Cyprus)	Marcos Michael	35	EU	2010	12	2	2015	Youth system	on loan to Nikos & Sokratis Erimis until 2014
34	RW	(Cyprus)	Constantinos Laifis	33	EU	2012	0	0	2016	Youth system	on loan to Alki Larnaca until 2014
38	AM	(Cyprus)	Adamos Hadjigeorgiou	34	EU	2010	1	0	2016	Youth system	on loan to Anagennisi Dherynia until 2014
51	GK	(Cyprus)	Constantinos Zacharoudiou	33	EU	2012	0	0	2016	Youth system	
TBA	CB	(Cyprus)	Nicos Efthimiou	33	EU	2011			2016	Youth system	on loan to Othellos Athienou F.C. until 2014
TBA	CM	(Cyprus)	Savvas Panayiotou	31	EU	2012			2016	Youth system	
TBA	CF	(Cyprus)	Constantinos Mintikkis	37	EU	2010			2016	Youth system	

- Last updated: 8 November 2013
- Source: Anorthosis.com/, Players transfer, Wikipedia players' articles (for player numbers, appearances, and goals)
- Ordered by squad number.

== Transfers ==
=== In ===
No.	Pos.	Nat.	Name	Age	EU	Moving from	Type	Transfer window	Ends	Transfer fee	Source
1	DF	(Argentina)	Mario Daniel Vega	29	EU	River Plate (Argentina)	Transfer	Summer	2014	Free	Anorthosis.com
4	DF	(Montenegro)	Savo Pavicevic	32	EU	Hapoel Tel Aviv (Israel)	Transfer	Summer	2014	Free	Anorthosis.com
6	MF	(Cyprus)	Christos Marangos	30	EU	AEK Larnaca (Cyprus)	Transfer	Summer	2014	Free	Anorthosis.com
10	FW	(Georgia (country))	Shota Grigalashvili	26	EU	SKA-Khabarovsk (Russia)	Transfer	Summer	2014	Free	Anorthosis.com
11	FW	(Argentina)	Roberto Colautti	31	EU	Maccabi Tel Aviv (Israel)	Transfer	Summer	2014	Free	Anorthosis.com
17	FW	(Israel)	Amit Ben Shushan	28	EU	Beitar Jerusalem (Israel)	Transfer	Summer	2015	Free	Anorthosis.com
19	MF	(Uruguay)	Gonzalo García	29	EU	Maccabi Tel Aviv (Israel)	On Loan	Summer	2014	Free	Anorthosis.com
20	FW	(Cyprus)	Jason Demetriou	25	EU	AEK Larnaca (Cyprus)	Transfer	Summer	2015	Free	Anorthosis.com
26	FW	(Ivory Coast)	Gaossou Fofana	29	EU	Doxa Katokopias (Cyprus)	On Loan	Summer	2014	Free	Anorthosis.com
41	MF	(Greece)	Grigoris Makos	26	EU	1860 Munich (Germany)	Transfer	Summer	2015	Free	Anorthosis.com

Total expenditure: ▼€0

=== Out ===
No.	Pos.	Nat.	Name	Age	EU	Moving to	Type	Transfer window	Transfer fee	Source
1	GK	(Montenegro)	Srđan Blažić	29	EU	Nea Salamis Famagusta (Cyprus)	Transfer	Summer	Released	Anorthosis.com
4	DF	(Netherlands)	Jurgen Colin	32	EU	Hapoel Tel Aviv (Israel)	Transfer	Summer	Free	Anorthosis.com
8	MF	(Brazil)	Juliano Spadacio	32	EU	Hapoel Acre (Israel)	Transfer	Summer	Released	Anorthosis.com
10	FW	(Israel)	Barak Yitzhaki	28	EU	Maccabi Tel Aviv (Israel)	Transfer	Summer	End of Loan	Anorthosis.com
11	FW	(Brazil)	Evandro Roncatto	26	EU	Beroe (Bulgaria)	Transfer	Summer	Released	Anorthosis.com
16	MF	(Greece)	Giannis Skopelitis	35	EU	AEK Larnaca (Cyprus)	Transfer	Summer	Free	Anorthosis.com
17	FW	(Czech Republic)	Jan Rezek	31	EU	Changchun Yatai (China)	Transfer	Summer	€300k	Anorthosis.com
20	MF	(Cyprus)	Vincent Laban	28	EU	Astra Giurgiu (Romania)	Transfer	Summer	Free	Anorthosis.com
21	FW	(Colombia)	Ricardo Laborde	25	Non-EU	Krasnodar (Russia)	Transfer	Summer	€1.2m	Anorthosis.com
33	DF	(Slovenia)	Branko Ilič	30	EU	Hapoel Tel Aviv (Israel)	Transfer	Summer	Free	Anorthosis.com
80	DF	(Romania)	Rui Duarte	32	EU	Free agent	Transfer	Summer	Released	Anorthosis.com

Total income: ▲€1,500,000

== International players ==
Player Infos		Activity	
National team	Player	Active	Non-A.
Cyprus	(Cyprus) Christos Marangos		✔
Cyprus	(Cyprus) Jason Demetriou	✔	
Cyprus	(Cyprus) Valentinos Sielis		✔
Cyprus	(Cyprus) Andreas Avraam	✔	
Israel	(Israel) Moshe Ohayon		✔
Israel	(Israel) Amit Ben Shushan		✔
Israel	(Argentina) Roberto Colautti		✔
Romania	(Romania) Dan Alexa		✔
Romania	(Romania) George Galamaz		✔
Greece	(Greece) Grigoris Makos		✔
(Georgia (country)) Georgia	(Georgia (country)) Shota Grigalashvili	✔	
Montenegro	(Montenegro) Savo Pavićević	✔	

== Club ==
=== Team staff ===
Position	Staff
Team Manager	(Cyprus) Julio Konnaris
Head Coach	(Portugal) Jorge Costa
Assistant Coach	(Portugal) Marco Leite
Goalkeeping coach	(Albania) Arjan Beqaj
Fitness coach	(Cyprus) Giorgos Georgiou
Physiotherapist	(Cyprus) Evagelos Englezou
Doctors	(Cyprus) Panikkos Kasapis (Cyprus) Nikos Hadjinikolaou
Masseur	(Bulgaria) Svetoslav Atanasov (Bulgaria) Plamen Panov

Last updated: 9 November 2013
Source: Anorthosis.com, Anorthosis.com, Anorthosis.com

=== Other information ===
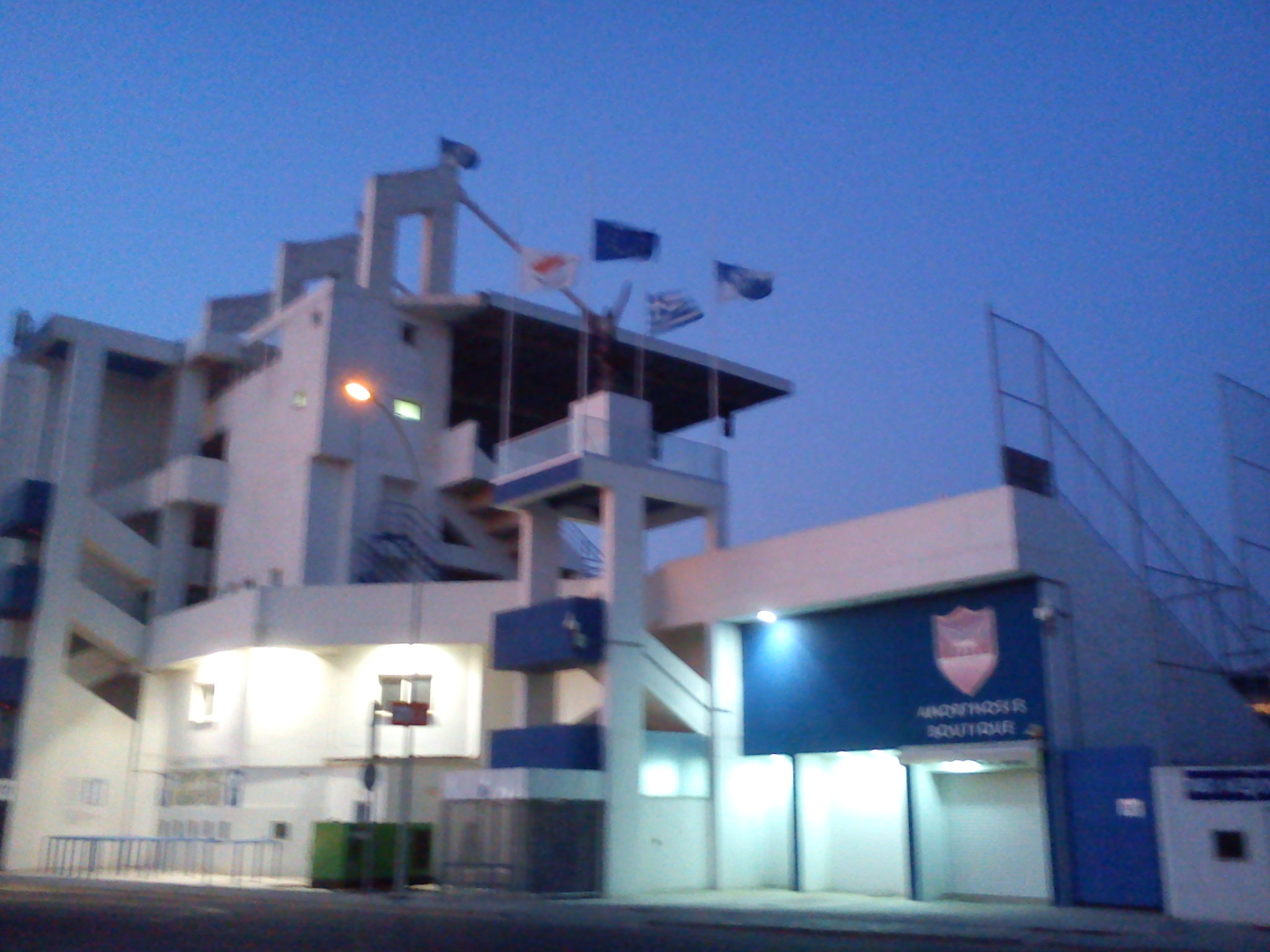
Antonis Papadopoulos Stadium in 2012.

Chairman	(Cyprus) Savvas Kakos
Ground (capacity and dimensions)	Antonis Papadopoulos Stadium (10,230 / 112x75 metres)

Updated to match played 7 June 2013
Source: A.Papadopoulos Sitting Plan

=== Board of directors ===
Position	Staff
Chairman	(Cyprus) Christos Poullaidis
Vice President	(Cyprus) Franzeskos Chatzimichael (Cyprus) Makis Kontos (Cyprus) Pavlos Ioannou (Cyprus) Andreas Poulaides (Cyprus) Panikos Pounnas
Executive Director	(Cyprus) Franzeskos Chatzimichael
Financial Advisor	(Cyprus) Panikos Chatzipanteli
Members	(Cyprus) Andreas Konstantinou (Cyprus) Panikos Kyriakou (Cyprus) Lucas Kousios (Cyprus) Panayotis Kakouras (Cyprus) Achileas Nicolaou (Cyprus) Konstantinos Pierides (Cyprus) Charalambos Manoli (Cyprus) Elina Patrioti

Last updated: 9 November 2013
Source: Anorthosis.com, Anorthosis.com

updated as it is by 9 November 2013

== Official sponsors ==
=== Main Sponsors ===
(Cyprus) Cyta Mobile Vodafone • (Cyprus) LTV

=== Sponsors ===
(United Kingdom) Betfair • (Germany) Puma • (Cyprus) Kypris & Yeranides LTD • (Cyprus) Coop Karpasias • (Cyprus) D.Ellinas holdings • (Cyprus) Petrolina • (Cyprus) Coop Makrasykas • (Cyprus) KEO

• (United States) McDonald's • (Cyprus) Coop Famagusta • (Cyprus) Sarras SuperMarkets • (Cyprus) Alexander College • (Cyprus) Hellenic Bank • (United States) Pepsi • (Cyprus) Aldecor

• (Cyprus) The Blue Pine • (Cyprus) Timinis • (Cyprus) M. Kontos Sinsurance • (Cyprus) Laiki Bank Championship • (Cyprus) SAPO • (Cyprus) Balla.com.cy • (Cyprus) Cyta

=== Supporters ===
(United States) T.G.I. Friday's • (Cyprus) Ydrogios • (Italy) Carrera Sunglasses • (Denmark) Carlsberg • (Cyprus) SYM • (Cyprus) Vittel • (Cyprus) Landas Colour • (Cyprus) Simlex

• Andreou Bross • CycOm • KPMG • Zhnon Tavern • Bank of Cyprus • Top Kinisis

Source: Anorthosis.com

=== UEFA Club rankings ===
Anorthosis Famagusta FC in European football

This is the current UEFA Club Rankings, including season 2013–14.

Last update: 14 June 2013

Club infos			Points					
Rank 13/14	Rank 12/13	Club	08/09	09/10	10/11	11/12	12/13	Total
102	102	(Italy) Genoa	2.2750	8.0856	2.3142	2.2714	2.8832	17.829
103	103	(France) AJ Auxerre	2.2000	3.0000	8.1500	2.1000	2.3500	17.800
104	104	(Serbia) Partizan	4.6000	2.6000	4.7000	1.9250	3.6000	17.425
105	105	(Cyprus) Anorthosis	9.2666	1.3500	2.1250	2.8250	1.8000	17.366
106	106	(Portugal) Nacional	1.3570	6.0000	3.7600	3.8666	2.3500	17.333
107	107	(Romania) Unirea	1.5284	11.2166	2.1332	0.8666	1.3600	17.104

=== Squad stats ===
	League	Europe	Cup	Total Stats
Games played	8	2	1	0
Games won	6	1	1	0
Games drawn	0	0	0	0
Games lost	2	1	0	0
Goals scored	21	3	0	0
Goals conceded	9	4	0	0
Goal difference	+12	-1	0	0
Clean sheets	9	2	0	0
Goal by Substitute	1	0	0	0
Shots	84	11	0	0
Corners	38	5	0	0
Players used	19	15	0	0
Offsides	12	4	0	0
Fouls suffered	0	10	0	0
Fouls committed	0	8	0	0
Yellow cards	20	1	0	0
Red cards	0	0	0	0

Last updated: 8 November 2013
Source: Anorthosis.com, Uefa.com

Players Used: Anorthosis has used a total of different players in all competitions.

== Competitions ==
- 2013–14 Cypriot First Division
- 2013–14 Cypriot Cup
- 2013–14 UEFA Europa League

== Friendly matches ==
Win Draw Loss Postponed

30 June 2013 Friendly	Presikhaaf (Netherlands)	0 – 4	(Cyprus) Anorthosis Famagusta	Noordwijk, Netherlands
18:00		Report	21' Moshe Ohayon; 32' Gaossou Fofana; 65' Jan Rezek; 71' Gaossou Fofana	Stadium: Golden Τulip training Center; Man of the Match: Gaossou Fofana

2 July 2013 Friendly	Gent (Belgium)	2 – 1	(Cyprus) Anorthosis Famagusta	Noordwijk, Netherlands
18:00	Ilombe Mboyo 81'; Ilombe Mboyo 88'	Report	41' Dan Alexa	Stadium: Golden Τulip training Center; Man of the Match: Ilombe Mboyo

4 July 2013 Friendly	Leuven (Belgium)	2 – 2	(Cyprus) Anorthosis Famagusta	Noordwijk, Netherlands
16:45	Ibou 51'; Ovidy Karuru 80'	Report	15' Jan Rezek; 56' Marko Andić	Stadium: Golden Τulip training Center; Man of the Match: Moshe Ohayon

8 July 2013 Friendly	Panathinaikos (Greece)	0 – 2	(Cyprus) Anorthosis Famagusta	Noordwijk, Netherlands
20:00		Report	50' (pen.) Marko Andić; 78' Zacharias Theodorou	Stadium: Golden Τulip training Center; Man of the Match: Marko Andić

12 July 2013 Friendly	Anorthosis Famagusta (Cyprus)	0 – 5	(Cyprus) Apollon Limassol	Larnaca, Cyprus
19:30		Report	4' Roberto García; 10' Roberto García; 42' Daniel Haber; 48' Daniel Haber; 58' Alex Konstantinou	Stadium: Antonis Papadopoulos; Man of the Match: Daniel Haber

=== Goal Scorers - Assist ===
R	Player	Pos	Goals
1	(Ivory Coast) Gaossou Fofana	LW	2
1	(Czech Republic) Jan Rezek	CF	2
1	(Slovenia) Marko Andić	RB	2
2	(Israel) Moshe Ohayon	DM	1
2	(Romania) Dan Alexa	DM	1
2	(Cyprus) Zacharias Theodorou	AM	1

R	Player	Pos	Assist
1	(Spain) Toni Calvo	RW	1
1	(Israel) Moshe Ohayon	DM	1

== UEFA Europa League ==
Win Draw Loss Postponed

18 July 2013 2nd QR.	Anorthosis Famagusta (Cyprus)	3 – 0	(Sweden) Gefle IF	Larnaca, Cyprus
20:00	Gonzalo García 12' (pen.); Roberto Colautti 33'; Dan Alexa (yellow card) 34'; Roberto Colautti 84'	Report; Report 2	(yellow card) 12' Anders Wikström; (yellow card) 65' Pär Asp	Stadium: Antonis Papadopoulos Stadium; Attendance: 11; Referee: (Italy) Andrea De Marco; Man of the Match: (Uruguay) Gonzalo García

25 July 2013 2nd QR.	Gefle IF (Sweden)	4 – 0 (4 – 3 agg.)	(Cyprus) Anorthosis Famagusta	Sundsvall, Sweden
19:00	Jakob Orlov 25'; Alexander Faltsetas 67'; Jakob Orlov 86'; Mikael Dahlberg 87'	Report; Report 2		Stadium: Norrporten Arena; Attendance: 304; Referee: (Iceland) Kristinn Jakobsson; Man of the Match: (Sweden) Jakob Orlov

R	Player	Pos	Goals
1	(Israel) Roberto Colautti	CF	2
2	(Spain) Gonzalo García	AM	1

R	Player	Pos	Assist
1	(Spain) Gonzalo García	AM	1
1	(Israel) Moshe Ohayon	DM	1

== Cypriot Cup ==
Win Draw Loss Postponed

23 October 2013 1st Round	Anorthosis Famagusta (Cyprus)	0 − 0 (5–4 p)	(Cyprus) Anagennisi Dherynia	Larnaca, Cyprus
18:00		Report		Stadium: Antonis Papadopoulos Stadium; Attendance: 300; Referee: (Cyprus) Stathis Manoli; Man of the Match: (Argentina) Mario Vega
	Penalties
	Moshe Ohayon (penalty scored); Gonzalo García (penalty scored); Shota Grigalashvili (penalty scored); Marko Andić (penalty scored); Amit Ben Shushan (penalty scored)		(penalty scored) Andreas Kyprianou; (penalty scored) Christos Siailis; (penalty scored) Prodromos Therapontos; (penalty scored) Christos Modestou; (penalty missed) Panagiotis Linardos

15 January 2014 2nd Round	Anorthosis Famagusta (Cyprus)	1 − 1	(Cyprus) AEK Larnaca	Larnaca, Cyprus
15:00	Demetris Economou (yellow card) 32'; Moshe Ohayon 78'	Report	33' (pen.) Kyriakos Pavlou; (yellow card) 32' Giannis Skopelitis; (yellow card) 76' Haim Megrelishvili; (yellow card) 81' (yellow-red card) David Català	Stadium: Antonis Papadopoulos Stadium; Attendance: 6,500; Referee: (Cyprus) Thomas Mouskos; Man of the Match: (Spain) Toni Calvo

15 January 2014 2nd Round	(Cyprus) AEK Larnaca	1 − 1 (4 – 2 agg.)	(Cyprus) Anorthosis Famagusta	Larnaca, Cyprus
15:00	Eleftherios Mertakas (yellow card) 26'; Serginho Greene 43'; Hasan Abu Zaid (yellow card) 48'; Joan Tomás Campasol 75'; Vitaliy Ivanko (yellow card) 88'; Nikos Englezou 89'; Haim Megrelishvili (yellow card) 90'; Alexandre Negri (yellow card) 90'	Report	(yellow card) 10' Andreas Avraam; (yellow card) 18' (yellow-red card) Andreas Avraam; (yellow card) 35' Paulo Jorge; (yellow card) 45' Moshe Ohayon; 85' Andreas Makris	Stadium: GSZ Stadium; Attendance: 6,500; Referee: (Cyprus) Leontios Trattos; Man of the Match: (Cyprus) Nikos Englezou

=== Goal Scorers - Assist ===
R	Player	Pos	Goals
1	(Cyprus) Andreas Makris	RW	1
1	(Israel) Moshe Ohayon	CM	1

R	Player	Pos	Assist
1	(Ivory Coast) Gaossou Fofana	LW	2

== Cyprus First Division ==
Win Draw Loss Postponed

31 August 2013 Match day 1	Anorthosis Famagusta (Cyprus)	3 – 1	(Cyprus) Omonia Nicosia	Larnaca, Cyprus
18:00	Roberto Colautti (yellow card) 38'; Dan Alexa (yellow card) 39'; Marko Andić (yellow card) 46'; Jason Demetriou 62'; Gonzalo García (yellow card) 86'; Toni Calvo (yellow card) 90+1'; Roberto Colautti 90+4'; Roberto Colautti 90+8'	Report	(yellow card) 30' Nuno Assis; (yellow card) 37' Leandro; (yellow card) 73' José; 85' Łukasz Gikiewicz	Stadium: Antonis Papadopoulos Stadium; Attendance: 7,500; Referee: (Cyprus) Giannis Anastasiou; Man of the Match: (Argentina) Roberto Colautti

15 September 2013 Match day 2	Anorthosis Famagusta (Cyprus)	3 – 1	(Cyprus) Apollon Limassol	Larnaca, Cyprus
18:00	Roberto Colautti 13'; Gonzalo García 31' (pen.); Savo Pavićević (yellow card) 36'; Roberto Colautti 76'; Jason Demetriou (yellow card) 80'; Paulo Jorge (yellow card) 87'	Report	(yellow card) 37' Bertrand Robert; 59' Christos Karipidis; (yellow card) 80' Roberto Garcia	Stadium: Antonis Papadopoulos Stadium; Attendance: 8,500; Referee: (Cyprus) Leontios Trattos; Man of the Match: (Argentina) Roberto Colautti

22 September 2013 Match day 3	Alki Larnaca (Cyprus)	0 – 4	(Cyprus) Anorthosis Famagusta	Larnaca, Cyprus
18:00		Report	19' Dan Alexa; 42' Gaossou Fofana; 73' Toni Calvo; 82' Roberto Colautti	Stadium: GSZ Stadium; Attendance: 4,500; Referee: (Cyprus) Loizos Panayotou; Man of the Match: (Spain) Toni Calvo

28 September 2013 Match day 4	Anorthosis Famagusta (Cyprus)	1 – 2	(Cyprus) Doxa Katokopias	Larnaca, Cyprus
18:00	Gaossou Fofana 59'; Gaossou Fofana (yellow card) 85'	Report	2' Elias Charalambous; 21' Ricardo Fernandes; (yellow card) 27' João Leonardo; (yellow card) 71' Richard Kingson; (red card) João Leonardo; (yellow card) 90' Tiago Costa	Stadium: Antonis Papadopoulos Stadium; Attendance: 6,500; Referee: (Cyprus) Christos Nicolaides; Man of the Match: (Ghana) Richard Kingson

5 October 2013 Match day 5	AEK Kouklia (Cyprus)	1 – 5	(Cyprus) Anorthosis Famagusta	Kouklia, Cyprus
18:00	Robert Stambolziev 15'; Ivan Forbes (yellow card) 41'; Alexandros Garpozis (yellow card) 76'	Report	8' Dan Alexa; 11' Roberto Colautti; 29' Dan Alexa; (yellow card) 35' Gaossou Fofana; 41' Toni Calvo; (yellow card) 43' Grigoris Makos; 50' Roberto Colautti	Stadium: Pafiako Stadium; Attendance: 1,200; Referee: (Cyprus) Christos Elia; Man of the Match: (Argentina) Roberto Colautti

20 October 2013 Match day 6	Anorthosis Famagusta (Cyprus)	2 – 1	(Cyprus) Ethnikos Achna	Larnaca, Cyprus
18:00	Savo Pavićević (yellow card) 13'; Toni Calvo (yellow card) 41'; Roberto Colautti (yellow card) 77'; Marko Andić (yellow card) 83'; Amit Ben Shushan (yellow card) 90'; Shota Grigalashvili 39'; Roberto Colautti 85'	Report	21' Rubén Arroyo Lloret; (yellow card) 27' Silas; (yellow card) 28' Henrique; (yellow card) 46' Ernad Sculic; (yellow card) 83' Liliu; (yellow card) 90' Gora Tall; (yellow card) 90' (yellow-red card) Panayiotis Frangeskou	Stadium: Antonis Papadopoulos Stadium; Attendance: 5,500; Referee: (Cyprus) Antonis Christodoulou; Man of the Match: (Ivory Coast) Gaossou Fofana

26 October 2013 Match day 7	APOEL Nicosia (Cyprus)	1 – 0	(Cyprus) Anorthosis Famagusta	Nicosia, Cyprus
	João Guilherme 52' (yellow card) 56'; Marcelo José Oliveira (yellow card) 56'	Report	(yellow card) 29' Gaossou Fofana; (yellow card) 64' Dan Alexa; (yellow card) 74' Marko Andić; (yellow card) 74' Savo Pavićević	Stadium: GSP Stadium; Attendance: 13,500; Referee: (Cyprus) Leontios Trattos; Man of the Match: (Cyprus) Stathis Aloneftis

2 November 2013 Match day 8	Anorthosis Famagusta (Cyprus)	3 – 2	(Cyprus) ENP Paralimni	Larnaca, Cyprus
16:00	Dan Alexa 45'; Shota Grigalashvili 45'; Gonzalo García 90+3'	[Report]	(yellow card) 14' Demetris Moulazimis; (yellow card) 43' Andreas Constantinou; 53' Marios Zannettou; 56' Hugo López Martínez; (red card) Igor Gal; (yellow card) 43' Dino Gavrić; (yellow card) 90' Giorgos Aresti	Stadium: Antonis Papadopoulos Stadium; Attendance: 6,000; Referee: (Cyprus) Giannis Anastasiou; Man of the Match: (Uruguay) Gonzalo García

9 November 2013 Match day 9	AEL Limassol (Cyprus)	3 – 1	(Cyprus) Anorthosis Famagusta	Limassol, Cyprus
15:00	Luciano Bebê 20'; Marios Nicolaou (yellow card) 25'; Dédé (yellow card) 30'; Marco Airosa (yellow card) 33'; Esteban Sachetti (yellow card) 48'; Savo Pavićević 53' (o.g.); Orlando Sá 69'	Report	(yellow card) 20' Valentinos Sielis; 33' (pen.) Gonzalo García; (yellow card) 28' Dan Alexa; (yellow card) 42' George Galamaz; (yellow card) 44' (yellow-red card) Valentinos Sielis	Stadium: Tsirion Stadium; Attendance: 5,332; Referee: (Cyprus) Marios Tsangaris; Man of the Match: (Portugal) Jorge Filipe Monteiro

24 November 2013 Match day 10	Anorthosis Famagusta (Cyprus)	1 – 1	(Cyprus) AEK Larnaca	Larnaca, Cyprus
15:00	Toni Calvo (yellow card) 63'; Grigoris Makos (yellow card) 68'; Gonzalo García 73'	Report	(yellow card) 75' Nikos Englezou; 90+4' Joan Tomás	Stadium: Antonis Papadopoulos Stadium; Attendance: 4,500; Referee: (Cyprus) Leontios Trattou; Man of the Match: (Spain) Joan Tomás

30 November 2013 Match day 11	Nea Salamis Famagusta (Cyprus)	0 – 3	(Cyprus) Anorthosis Famagusta	Limassol, Cyprus
19:00	Hélio Roque (yellow card) 36'; Stergios Psianos (yellow card) 60'	Report	12' Toni Calvo; 38' Paulo Jorge; (yellow card) 40' Savo Pavićević; 45' Gaossou Fofana; (yellow card) 64' Shota Grigalashvili; (yellow card) 67' Marko Andić; (yellow card) 83' Alexa	Stadium: Ammochostos Stadium; Attendance: 2,000; Referee: (Cyprus) Thomas Mouskos; Man of the Match: (Spain) Toni Calvo

7 December 2013 Match day 12	Anorthosis Famagusta (Cyprus)	1 – 0	(Cyprus) Aris Limassol	Larnaca, Cyprus
18:00	Jason Demetriou (yellow card) 76'; Moshe Ohayon 90+4'	Report	(yellow card) 52' Dušan Kerkez; (yellow card) 59' Panayiotis Constantinou; (yellow card) 74' Panos Theodorou	Stadium: Antonis Papadopoulos Stadium; Attendance: 3,000; Referee: (Cyprus) Marios Nikolaou; Man of the Match: (Israel) Moshe Ohayon

15 December 2013 Match day 13	Ermis Aradippou (Cyprus)	0 – 0	(Cyprus) Anorthosis Famagusta	Limassol, Cyprus
18:00	Henrique (yellow card) 12'; Luis Morán (yellow card) 54'	Report	(yellow card) 23' Savo Pavićević; (yellow card) 68' Paulo Jorge; (yellow card) 90' Andić; (yellow card) 90' Alexa	Stadium: Ammochostos Stadium; Attendance: 2,500; Referee: (Cyprus) Marios Tsangaris; Man of the Match: (Greece) Giannis Arabatzis

21 December 2013 Match day 14	Omonia Nicosia (Cyprus)	3 – 2	(Cyprus) Anorthosis Famagusta	Nicosia, Cyprus
15:00	Platini (yellow card) 36'; André Schembri 44'; Marco Soares 55' (pen.); Charalambos Kyriakou (yellow card) 60'; Łukasz Gikiewicz (yellow card) 70'; André Schembri 80'; Anthony Scaramozzino (red card) 85'; João Paulo Andrade (yellow card) 87'; Marco Soares (yellow card) 90'	Report	(yellow card) 9' Jason Demetriou; (red card) 19' Dan Alexa; 26' Roberto Colautti; (yellow card) 45' Savo Pavićević; (yellow card) 54' George Galamaz; (yellow card) 63' Andreas Avraam; (yellow card) 85' Grigoris Makos; 89' Gonzalo García	Stadium: GSP Stadium; Attendance: 8,138; Referee: (Cyprus) Antonis Christodoulou; Man of the Match: (Portugal) Marco Soares

4 January 2014 Match day 15	Apollon Limassol (Cyprus)	1 – 1	(Cyprus) Anorthosis Famagusta	Limassol, Cyprus
15:00	Roberto Colautti 25' (o.g.); Giorgos Merkis (yellow card) 78'	Report	(yellow card) 66' Jason Demetriou; 71' Moshe Ohayon; (yellow card) 78' Mario Vega	Stadium: Tsirion Stadium; Attendance: 7,200; Referee: (Cyprus) Marios Panayi; Man of the Match: (Israel) Moshe Ohayon

11 January 2014 Match day 16	Anorthosis Famagusta (Cyprus)	3 – 1	(Cyprus) Alki Larnaca	Larnaca, Cyprus
15:00	Toni Calvo (yellow card) 43'; Andreas Avraam 74'; Andreas Makris 77'; Roberto Colautti 78'	Report	(yellow card) 30' Emilios Panayotou; 54' Demetris Kyprianou	Stadium: Antonis Papadopoulos Stadium; Attendance: 3,200; Referee: (Cyprus) Kostas Nicolaou; Man of the Match: (Cyprus) Andreas Makris

19 January 2014 Match day 17	Doxa Katokopias (Cyprus)	1 – 6	(Cyprus) Anorthosis Famagusta	Larnaca, Cyprus
15:00	Pablo Suárez (yellow card) 24'; Leandro de Souza 89' (pen.)	Report	14' Gonzalo García; (yellow card) 35' Andreas Avraam; 32' Gaossou Fofana; (yellow card) 39' Savo Pavićević; 53' Gonzalo García; (yellow card) 58' Grigoris Makos; (yellow card) 68' Amit Ben Shushan; 75' Amit Ben Shushan; 77' Gonzalo García; 80' Gonzalo García; (yellow card) 89' Paulo Jorge	Stadium: Ammochostos Stadium; Attendance: 1,200; Referee: (Cyprus) Antonis Christodoulou; Man of the Match: (Uruguay) Gonzalo García

25 January 2014 Match day 18	Anorthosis Famagusta (Cyprus)	2 – 2	(Cyprus) AEK Kouklia	Larnaca, Cyprus
15:00	Leandro Becerra 40'; Jason Demetriou (yellow card) 76'; Grigoris Makos (yellow card) 80'; Andreas Makris 90'	Report	64' Pablo Vranjicán; (red card) 71' Ivan Forbes; 81' Michel Acosta; (yellow card) 90' Michel Acosta	Stadium: Antonis Papadopoulos Stadium; Attendance: 0 Referee: (Cyprus) Avraam Tsoukas; Man of the Match: (Cyprus) Charalambos Kairinos

1 February 2014 Match day 19	Ethnikos Achna (Cyprus)	1 – 2	(Cyprus) Anorthosis Famagusta	Achna, Cyprus
18:00	Silas 11'; Marco Aurelio (yellow card) 49'; Petros Hadjiaros (yellow card) 58'; Silas (red card) 73'	Report	35' (o.g.) Miran Burgič; (yellow card) 30' Moshe Ohayon; (yellow card) 53' Demetris Economou; (yellow card) 60' Roberto Colautti; 68' Roberto Colautti	Stadium: Dasaki Stadium; Attendance: 1,150; Referee: (Cyprus) Charalambos Skapoulis; Man of the Match: (Argentina) Roberto Colautti

1 February 2014 Match day 20	Anorthosis Famagusta (Cyprus)	1 – 2	(Cyprus) APOEL Nicosia	Larnaca, Cyprus
15:00	Roberto Colautti 76'	Report	18' De Vincenti; 81' Cillian Sheridan	Stadium: Andonis Papadopolous; Attendance: 7,415; Referee: (Cyprus) Marios Panayi; Man of the Match: (Republic of Ireland) Cillian Sheridan

15 February 2014 Match day 21	ENP Paralimni (Cyprus)	4 – 0	(Cyprus) Anorthosis Famagusta	Paralimni, Cyprus
15:00	Besart Ibraimi 37'; Besart Ibraimi 42'; Besart Ibraimi 63'; Igor Angulo 73'	Report		Stadium: Tasos Marcou Stadium; Attendance: 1,150; Referee: (Cyprus) Marios Tsaggaris; Man of the Match: (North Macedonia) Besart Ibraimi

22 February 2014 Match day 22	Anorthosis Famagusta (Cyprus)	0 – 2	(Cyprus) AEL Limassol	Larnaca, Cyprus
15:00		Report	17' Andrija Kaluderovic; 77' Fouad Idabdelhay	Stadium: Andonis Papadopolous; Referee: (Cyprus) Charalambos Skapulis

2 March 2014 Match day 23	AEK Larnaca (Cyprus)	2 – 1	(Cyprus) Anorthosis Famagusta	Larnaca, Cyprus
17:00	Kullis Pavlou 12'; Vitaliy Ivanko 82'	Report	86' Andreas Avraam	Stadium: GSZ Stadium; Referee: (Cyprus) Christos Nicolaides

9 March 2014 Match day 24	Anorthosis Famagusta (Cyprus)	1 – 1	(Cyprus) Nea Salamis Famagusta	Larnaca, Cyprus
17:00	Shota Grigalashvili 67'	Report	90+3' Justin Mengolo	Stadium: Antonis Papadopoulos Stadium; Attendance: Close Doors; Referee: (Cyprus) Giannis Anastasiou

15 March 2014 Match day 25	Aris Limassol (Cyprus)	2 – 0	(Cyprus) Anorthosis Famagusta	Limassol, Cyprus
18:00	Christer Youssef 44'; Turam 59'	Report		Stadium: Tsirion Stadium; Referee: (Cyprus) Marios Panayi

19 March 2014 Match day 26	Anorthosis Famagusta (Cyprus)	0 – 1	(Cyprus) Ermis Aradippou	Larnaca, Cyprus
18:00		Report	48' Césinha	Stadium: Antonis Papadopoulos Stadium; Attendance: 861; Referee: (Cyprus) Leontios Trattos

=== Results summary ===
Overall								Home						Away					
Pld	W	D	L	GF	GA	GD	Pts	W	D	L	GF	GA	GD	W	D	L	GF	GA	GD
19	11	4	4	43	22	+21	37	6	2	1	19	11	+8	5	2	3	24	11	+13

Last updated: 5 February 2014.
Source: Soccerway

=== Results by round ===
Round	1	2	3	4	5	6	7	8	9	10	11	12	13	14	15	16	17	18	19	20	21	22	23	24	25	26	27	28	29	30	31	32	33	34	35	36
Ground	H	H	A	H	A	H	A	H	A	H	A	H	A	A	A	H	A	H	A	H	A	H	A	H	A	H	A	H	A	H	A					
Result	W	W	W	L	W	W	L	W	L	D	W	W	D	L	D	W	W	D	W	L	L	L	L	D	L	L	L	L	L	L	L					
Position	2	1	1	2	1	1	3	3	4	4	3	3	3	6	6	6	5	5	5	2	6	6	6	6	6	6	6	6	6	6	6	6	6	6	6	6

Updated to match(es) played on 5 February 2014. Source: anorthosisfc.com
A = Away; H = Home; W = Win; D = Draw; L = Loss

=== League table ===
First phase
Pos	Team	Pld	W	D	L	GF	GA	GD	Pts	Qualification or relegation
4	Ermis Aradippou	26	15	7	4	44	28	+16	52	Qualification for the championship group
5	Omonia Nicosia	26	13	8	5	45	22	+23	47	Qualification for the championship group
6	Anorthosis Famagusta	26	11	5	10	46	36	+10	38	Qualification for the championship group
7	AEK Larnaca	26	10	7	9	37	28	+9	37	Qualification for the relegation group
8	Nea Salamis Famagusta (Note: On 17 May 2013, Nea Salamina were deducted three points by CFA because they failed to meet the financial criteria of UEFA.)	26	12	2	12	26	31	−5	35	Qualification for the relegation group

Source: CFA, UEFA
Rules for classification: 1) points; 2) head-to-head points; 3) head-to-head goal difference; 4) head-to-head away goals scored; 5) goal difference; 6) number of goals scored
Notes:

Championship group
Pos	Team	Pld	W	D	L	GF	GA	GD	Pts	Qualification
1	APOEL (C)	36	25	6	5	80	25	+55	81 (Note: APOEL: 7 pts; AEL: 4 pts)	Qualification for the Champions League third qualifying round
2	AEL Limassol	36	25	6	5	68	29	+39	81	Qualification for the Champions League third qualifying round
3	Apollon Limassol	36	24	5	7	66	29	+37	77	Qualification for the Europa League play-off round (Note: Since cup winners APOEL qualified for the 2014-15 UEFA Champions League and the runners-up Ermis finished top-four, all of the Europa League spots revert into league positions.)
4	Ermis Aradippou	36	18	8	10	55	54	+1	62	Qualification for the Europa League third qualifying round
5	Omonia Nicosia	36	16	11	9	59	37	+22	59	Qualification for the Europa League second qualifying round
6	Anorthosis Famagusta	36	12	6	18	57	64	−7	42	

Source: CFA, UEFA
Rules for classification: 1) points; 2) head-to-head points; 3) head-to-head goal difference; 4) head-to-head goals scored; 5) goal difference; 6) number of goals scored.
(C) Champions

=== Goal scorers - assist ===
R	Player	Pos	Goals
1	(Argentina) Roberto Colautti	ST	11
2	(Uruguay) Gonzalo García	AM	9
3	(Romania) Dan Alexa	CM	4
3	(Ivory Coast) Gaossou Fofana	LW	4
5	(Spain) Toni Calvo	RW	3
6	(Cyprus) Andreas Makris	RW	2
6	(Georgia (country)) Shota Grigalashvili	AM	2
6	(Israel) Moshe Ohayon	CM	2
10	(Portugal) Paulo Jorge	CB	1
10	(Argentina) Leandro Becerra	AM	1
10	(Cyprus) Jason Demetriou	RB	1
10	(Cyprus) Andreas Avraam	LB	1
10	(Israel) Amit Ben Shushan	AM	1

R	Player	Pos	Assist
1	(Spain) Toni Calvo	RW	5
2	(Ivory Coast) Gaossou Fofana	LW	3
2	(Argentina) Roberto Colautti	ST	3
4	(Georgia (country)) Shota Grigalashvili	AM	1
4	(Romania) Dan Alexa	CM	1
4	(Serbia) Marko Andić	LB	1
4	(Israel) Moshe Ohayon	CM	1

=== Player's Rate ===
R	Player	League		Europe		Cup		Total
		Goals	Assist	Goals	Assist	Goals	Assist	Points
1	(Argentina) Roberto Colautti	8	3	2	0	0	0	19.5
2	(Spain) Toni Calvo	2	5	0	0	0	0	10.5
3	(Romania) Dan Alexa	4	1	0	0	0	0	7.5
3	(Ivory Coast) Gaossou Fofana	2	3	0	0	0	0	7.5
3	(Uruguay) Gonzalo García	2	0	1	1	0	0	7.5

- League goals/assists: 1,5 points
- Europe goals/assists: 1,5 points
- Cup goals/assists: 1 point
