= 2014–15 Anorthosis Famagusta FC season =

Anorthosis Famagusta
2014–15 season
- Chairman: Christos Poullaides
- Manager: André Paus
- Stadium: Antonis Papadopoulos Stadium
- Top goalscorer: League: Toni Calvo (2 goal); Yuriy Yakovenko (2 goal); All: Toni Calvo (2 goal); Yuriy Yakovenko (2 goal)

The 2014–15 season was Anorthosis' 66th consecutive season in the Cypriot First Division, the top division of Cyprus football. It covers a period from 1 July 2014 to 30 May 2015.

== Season overview ==
=== Pre-season ===
Anorthosis Famagusta commenced their summer transfer activity on 11 June, by signing Georgian national football player Irakli Maisuradze from Valletta for 1+1 years.

On 17 June, Anorthosis announced the signing of Georgian football player Giorgi Aburjania from Lokomotivi Tbilisi for 1+1 years.

On 24 June, Anorthosis announced the signing of Razak Nuhu from Manchester City B.

On 27 June, Anorthosis announced the sale of Cypriot national footballer Valentinos Sielis to AEL Limassol.

On 2 July, Anorthosis announced the signing of Spanish footballer Albert Serrán from AD Alcorcón for the next year.

On 21 July, Anorthosis announced the signing of Ukraine national footballer with U21 Yuriy Yakovenko from Ajaccio for the next year.

On 16 August, Anorthosis announced the year loan of German Chinedu Ede from Mainz 05. and the 2 year contract with Uruguayan footballer Gonzalo García from Maccabi Tel Aviv.

On 22 August, Anorthosis announced the loan of their goalkeeper Aldo Teqja to Elpida Xylofagou for a year.

On 25 August, Anorthosis announced the year loan of Latvia national footballer Valērijs Šabala from Club Brugge.

On 28 Augusta, Anorthosis announced the 2-year contract with Sweden national footballer Markus Holgersson from Helsingborgs IF.

On 1 September, Anorthosis announced the year loan of Belgium national goalkeeper Thomas Kaminski from Anderlecht.

=== August 2014 ===
Cyprus Football Association postponed the first matchweek game between APOEL Nicosia and Anorthosis Famagusta, because of APOEL's matches for the UEFA Champions League against Aalborg BK, after the consent of Anorthosis and APOEL.

=== September 2014 ===
On 1 September, Anorthosis faced Omonia Nicosia in GSP Stadium. Anorthosis lost their first game in the league 3-2. Anorthosis equaled twice the score, at 19th minute with Chinedu Ede and at 63rd minute with Yuriy Yakovenko.

On 16 September, Anorthosis faced AEK Larnaca in Antonis Papadopoulos Stadium. Anorthosis defeated AEK 2-1 and got the 3 first points in this season. Anorthosis opened the score with Yuriy Yakovenko at 29th minute, but AEK equaled the score with Roberto Colautti at 40th minute. Anorthosis got the win in last minute after the free kick of Toni Calvo in 90+3rd minute of the match.

On 22 September, Anorthosis faced Ermis Aradippou in Dasaki Stadium. Anorthosis suffered the second defeat with score 1-0, when Marcos De Azevedo scored after the assist of Besart Ibraimi.

On 24 September, Anorthosis faced APOEL Nicosia in GSP Stadium for the 1st match day postponed match. After a good first half anorthosis not kept pace of Apoel in second half and lost for a second match in a row in GSP Stadium and in division. Gustavo Manduca opens the score at 65th minute and 9 minutes later he won a penalty and the red card of Constantinos Laifis. At the 75th minute, Manduca missed the penalty, but Aloneytis followed the phase and with powerful shot formatting the final score.

On 27 September, Anorthosis faced Ayia Napa in Antonis Papadopoulos Stadium. Anorthosis does not had a particularly trouble and got the win 4-1. At 6th minute Stavros Stathakis scored an own goal. In 19th minute Ayia Napa equaled the score with David Mena as seen in the television lens the goal wrongly counted as it was prominently off side. At 55th minute Anorthosis ahead the score with Andreas Makris after a running of Razak Nuhu from the left side and the pass at the right time. 3 minutes later Emiliano Fusco get the 2nd yellow card and left Ayia Napa with 10 players. Anorthsis until the end of the match scored 2 more goals, with Giorgi Aburjania after a pass from Toni Calvo and at the last minute with a Penalty who scored Toni Calvo.

== Club ==
=== Technical staff ===
Position	Staff
Team Administrator	(Cyprus) Alexis Kokkinis
Director of Football	(Netherlands) Ted van Leeuwen
Head coach	(Netherlands) André Paus
Assistant coach	(Cyprus) Simos Tarapoulouzi
Fitness trainer	(Cyprus) Giorgos Georgiou
Goalkeepers coach	(Albania) Arjan Beqaj
U-21 Head Coach	(Serbia) Arsen Mihajlovic
Scouter	(Denmark) Jimmi Jacobsen
Scouter	(Cyprus) Charis Charalambous
Scouter	(Cyprus) Kostas Konstantinou

Source: Anorthosis Famagusta official website

=== Medical staff ===
Position	Staff
Head Doctor	(Cyprus) Dr. Panikkos Kasapis
Head Doctor	(Cyprus) Dr. Nikos Hadjinikolaou
Exercise Physiology	(Cyprus) Dr. Marios Christou
Physical Therapist	(Cyprus) Evagelos Nikolaou
Nutritionist	(Cyprus) Ioannis Kerimis
Masseur	(Bulgaria) Plamen Panov
Masseur	(Bulgaria) Yordan Stoyanov

Source: Anorthosis Famagusta official website

=== Club hierarchy ===
Position	Staff
President	Christos Poullaides
1st Vice-president	Frantzeskos Hadjiimichael
2nd Vice-president	Makis Kontos
3rd Vice-president	Andreas Poullaides
Executive Director	Frantzeskos Hadjimichael
Financial Director	Stavros K. Hadjikyriacou
Member	Andreas Konstantinou
Member	Panikos Kyriakou
Member	Achilleas Nicolaou
Member	Elina Patrioti

Source: Anorthosis Famagusta official website

== Current squad ==
Last Update: September 28, 2014

=== Squad information ===
N	Pos.	Nat.	Name	Age	EU	Since	App	Goals	Ends	Transfer fee	Notes
1	GK	(Argentina)	Mario Daniel Vega	42		2013	15	0	2016	Free	
2	RB	(Slovenia)	Marko Andic	42	EU	2011	80	1	2015	Free	
3	CB	(Spain)	Serrán Polo (captain)	42	EU	2014	5	0	2015	Free	
5	LB	(Ghana)	Razak Nuhu	35		2014	5	0	2015	Free	
6	CM	(Cyprus)	Christos Marangos (captain)	43	EU	2013	101	13	2015	Free	
7	RM	(Spain)	Toni Calvo	39	EU	2012	52	8	2015	Free	
8	AM	(Georgia (country))	Giorgi Aburjania	31		2014	5	0	2015	Free	
9	CF	(Latvia)	Valērijs Šabala	32	EU	2014	2	0	2015	Free	On Loan from (Belgium) Club Brugge
10	AM	(Uruguay)	Gonzalo García	43	EU	2013	25	10	2016	Free	
11	CF	(Ukraine)	Yuriy Yakovenko	33	EU	2014	5	2	2015	Free	
13	GK	(Belgium)	Thomas Kaminski	34	EU	2014	3	0	2015	Free	On Loan from (Belgium) Anderlecht
15	CB	(Sweden)	Markus Holgersson	41	EU	2014	4	0	2015	Free	
16	GK	(France)	Mathieu Valverde	43	EU	2012	43	0	2016	Free	
18	CM	(Georgia (country))	Irakli Maisuradze	38		2014	5	0	2017	Free	
19	LM	(Germany)	Chinedu Ede	39	EU	2014	4	1	2015	Free	On Loan from (Germany) Mainz 05
22	CB	(Cyprus)	Demetris Economou	33	EU	2012	13	0	2017	€150K	
24	RB	(Cyprus)	Jason Demetriou (captain)	38	EU	2013	20	1	2015	Free	
30	LM	(Cyprus)	Andreas Avraam	39	EU	2013	34	2	2017	€300K	
32	GK	(Cyprus)	Gavriel Constantinou	37	EU	2008	3	0	2015	Youth system	
33	RM	(Cyprus)	Andreas Makris	30	EU	2013	32	4	2017	€ 20K	
34	LM	(Cyprus)	Constantinos Laifis	33	EU	2012	14	0	2016	Youth system	
35	RB	(Cyprus)	Panayiotis Loizides	31	EU	2012	12	0	2016	Youth system	
36	AM	(Cyprus)	Adamos Andreou	31	EU	2012	5	0	2016	Youth system	
37	AM	(Cyprus)	Zacharias Theodorou	33	EU	2011	12	0	2016	Youth system	
41	CM	(Greece)	Grigoris Makos (captain)	39	EU	2013	29	0	2015	Free	
54	AM	(Cyprus)	Theofilos Chrysochos	31	EU	2011	1	0	2016	Youth system	
70	AM	(Cyprus)	Adamos Hadjigeorgiou	34	EU	2010	1	0	2016	Youth system	

- Last updated: 28 September 2014
- Source: , Players transfer, Wikipedia players' articles (for player numbers, appearances, and goals)
- Ordered by squad number.

More Anorthosis Footballers

N	Pos.	Nat.	Name	Age	EU	Since	App	Goals	Ends	Transfer fee	Notes
40	GK	(Albania)	Aldo Teqja	31	EU	2012	3	0	2016	Youth system	on loan to Elpida Xylofagou until 30/06/2015
TBA	CB	(Cyprus)	Nicos Efthimiou	33	EU	2011			2016	Youth system	on loan to Othellos Athienou F.C. until 30/06/2015

- Last updated: 01 September 2014
- Source: Anorthosis.com/, Players transfer, Wikipedia players' articles (for player numbers, appearances, and goals)
- Ordered by squad number.

== Transfers ==
=== In ===
No.	Pos.	Nat.	Name	Age	EU	Moving from	Type	Transfer window	Ends	Transfer fee	Source
3	DF	(Spain)	Albert Serrán	42	EU	(Spain) Alcorcón	Transfer	Summer	2015	Free	anorthosisfc.com.cy
5	DF	(Ghana)	Razak Nuhu	35		(England) Manchester City	Transfer	Summer	2015	Free	anorthosisfc.com.cy
8	MF	(Georgia (country))	Giorgi Aburjania	31		(Georgia (country)) Lokomotivi Tbilisi	Transfer	Summer	2015	Free	anorthosisfc.com.cy
9	MF	(Latvia)	Valērijs Šabala	32	EU	(Belgium) Club Brugge	Loan	Summer	2015	Free	anorthosisfc.com.cy
10	MF	(Uruguay)	Gonzalo García	43	EU	(Israel) Maccabi Tel Aviv	Transfer	Summer	2016	Free	anorthosisfc.com.cy
11	MF	(Ukraine)	Yuriy Yakovenko	33	EU	(France) Ajaccio	Transfer	Summer	2015	Free	anorthosisfc.com.cy
13	GK	(Belgium)	Thomas Kaminski	34	EU	(Belgium) Anderlecht	Loan	Summer	2015	Free	anorthosisfc.com.cy
15	DF	(Sweden)	Markus Holgersson	41	EU	(Sweden) Helsingborgs IF	Transfer	Summer	2015	Free	anorthosisfc.com.cy
18	MF	(Georgia (country))	Irakli Maisuradze	38		(Malta) Valletta	Transfer	Summer	2015	Free	anorthosisfc.com.cy
19	MF	(Germany)	Chinedu Ede	39	EU	(Germany) Mainz 05	Loan	Summer	2015	Free	anorthosisfc.com.cy

Total expenditure: ▼€0

== Cyprus First Division ==
=== Matches ===
Win Draw Loss Postponed

24 September 2014 Match day 1	(Cyprus) APOEL Nicosia	2 – 0	(Cyprus) Anorthosis Famagusta	Nicosia, Cyprus
19:00	Mário Sérgio (yellow card) 42'; Kaká (yellow card) 53'; Nuno Morais (yellow card) 55'; Gustavo Manduca 65'; João Guilherme (yellow card) 69'; Stathis Aloneftis 75'	Report	(yellow card) 42' Irakli Maisuradze; (yellow card) 57' Marko Andić; (red card) 74' Constantinos Laifis	Stadium: GSP Stadium; Attendance: 9.707; Referee: (Cyprus) Demetris Masias; Man of the Match: (Brazil) Gustavo Manduca

1 September 2014 Match day 2	(Cyprus) Omonia Nicosia	3 – 2	(Cyprus) Anorthosis Famagusta	Nicosia, Cyprus
19:00	Mickaël Poté 2'; Cristóvão Ramos (yellow card) 10'; Milan Stepanov (yellow card) 28'; José Moreira (yellow card) 32'; Mickaël Poté 39'; Serginho (yellow card) 52'; Ucha Lobjanidze (yellow card) 67'; Onisiforos Roushias 88'	Report	19' Chinedu Ede; (yellow card) 28' Yuriy Yakovenko; (yellow card) 42' Constantinos Laifis; (yellow card) 44' Irakli Maisuradze; (yellow card) 49' Razak Nuhu; 63' Yuriy Yakovenko; (yellow card) 71' Markus Holgersson	Stadium: GSP Stadium; Attendance: 10.015; Referee: (Cyprus) Thomas Mouskos; Man of the Match: (Cyprus) Onisiforos Roushias

16 September 2014 Match day 3	(Cyprus) Anorthosis Famagusta	2 – 1	(Cyprus) AEK Larnaca	Larnaca, Cyprus
19:00	Yuriy Yakovenko 29'; Marko Andić (yellow card) 36'; Toni Calvo (yellow card) 73'; Toni Calvo 90+3'	Report	40' Roberto Colautti; (yellow card) 53' David Català; (yellow card) 62' Vander Vieira; (yellow card) 64' Eleftherios Mertakas; (yellow card) 90+1' Vladimir Boljević	Stadium: Antonis Papadopoulos Stadium; Referee: (Cyprus) Kostas Nicolaou; Man of the Match: (Spain) Toni Calvo

22 September 2014 Match day 4	(Cyprus) Ermis Aradippou	1 – 0	(Cyprus) Anorthosis Famagusta	Achna, Larnaca, Cyprus
20:00	Marcos De Azevedo 21'; Besart Ibraimi (yellow card) 44'; Rubén Palazuelos (yellow card) 55'; Jonatas Belusso (yellow card) 68'; Giannis Taralidis (yellow card) 78'	Report	(yellow card) 55' Toni Calvo	Stadium: Dasaki Stadium; Referee: (Cyprus) Kostas Psevdiotis; Man of the Match: (Brazil) Marcos De Azevedo

27 September 2014 Match day 5	(Cyprus) Anorthosis Famagusta	4 – 1	(Cyprus) Ayia Napa	Larnaca, Cyprus
20:00	Stavros Stathakis 6' (o.g.); Andreas Makris 55'; Giorgi Aburjania 79'; Toni Calvo 90+3'; Marko Andić (yellow card) 85'	Report	19' David Mena; (yellow card) 21' Stergios Psianos; (yellow card) 51' Emiliano Fusco; (yellow card) 58' (yellow-red card) Emiliano Fusco	Stadium: Antonis Papadopoulos Stadium; Referee: (Cyprus) Charalambos Skapoulis; Man of the Match: (Spain) Toni Calvo

5 October 2014 Match day 6	(Cyprus) AEL Limassol	4 – 1	(Cyprus) Anorthosis Famagusta	Limassol, Cyprus
18:00	Nicolaou (yellow card) 23'; Danielzinho 31'; Cadú (yellow card) 33'; Edmar (yellow card) 46' (goal) 66'; Gikiewicz 48'; Guidileye (yellow card) 64'; Stavrou 89'	Report	Makos (yellow card) 17'; Yakovenko 56'; Toni Calvo (yellow card) 63'	Stadium: Tsirion Stadium; Attendance: 300; Referee: (Cyprus) Marios Tsangaris

26 October 2014 Match day 7	(Cyprus) Anorthosis Famagusta	1-0	(Cyprus) Othellos Athienou	Larnaca, Cyprus
18:00	Albert Serrán 28'; Toni Calvo (yellow card) 70'; Aburjanja (yellow card) 84'; Demetriou (yellow card) 90+2'	Summary	Giorgos Loizou (yellow card) 35'; Ndong (red card) 63'; Nicos Efthymiou (yellow card) 68'	Stadium: Antonis Papadopoulos Stadium; Attendance: 3,000; Referee: (Cyprus) Loizos Panayiotou

3 November 2014 Match day 8	(Cyprus) Nea Salamis Famagusta FC	2-3	(Cyprus) Anorthosis Famagusta	Larnaca, Cyprus
18:00	Onyemah 74'; Diego León 90+2'	Summary	Nuhu 29' (yellow card) 72'; Avraam (yellow card) 54'; Makris 55'; Albert Serrán (yellow card) 62'; Marangos (yellow card) 80'; Yakovenko 87'	Stadium: Ammochostos Stadium; Attendance: 1,500; Referee: (Cyprus) Christos Nicolaides

8 November 2014 Match day 9	(Cyprus) Anorthosis Famagusta	0-0	(Cyprus) Ethnikos Achna FC	Larnaca, Cyprus
18:00	Toni Calvo (yellow card) 16'; Holgersson (yellow card) 45'; Yakovenko (yellow card) 59'	Summary	Eduardo Pincelli (yellow card) 31'; Tall (yellow card) 49'; Yiangoudakis (yellow card) 85'; Dober (yellow card) 89'	Stadium: Antonis Papadopoulos Stadium; Attendance: 3,000; Referee: (Cyprus) Yannis Anastasiou

=== Classification ===
Pos	Team	Pld	W	D	L	GF	GA	GD	Pts	Qualification
3	Omonia Nicosia	22	12	3	7	32	22	+10	39 (Note: OMO 0–1 AEK; AEK 1–3 OMO)	Qualification to championship group
4	AEK Larnaca	22	11	6	5	41	23	+18	39	Qualification to championship group
5	Anorthosis Famagusta	22	12	2	8	32	22	+10	38	Qualification to championship group
6	Ermis Aradippou	22	10	5	7	29	28	+1	35	Qualification to championship group
7	AEL Limassol	22	7	9	6	33	26	+7	30	Qualification to relegation group

Source: UEFA, CFA
Rules for classification: 1) points; 2) head-to-head points; 3) head-to-head goal difference; 4) head-to-head away goals scored; 5) goal difference; 6) number of goals scored

==== Results summary ====
Overall								Home						Away					
Pld	W	D	L	GF	GA	GD	Pts	W	D	L	GF	GA	GD	W	D	L	GF	GA	GD
5	2	0	3	7	8	−1	6	2	0	0	5	2	+3	0	0	3	2	6	−4

Last updated: 28 September 2014.
Source: UEFA

==== Results by round ====
Round	1	2	3	4	5	6	7	8	9	10	11	12	13	14	15	16	17	18	19	20	21	22	23	24	25	26	27	28	29	30	31	32
Ground	A	A	H	A	H																											
Result	L	L	W	L	W																											
Position	10	10	6	10	6																											

Updated to match(es) played on 28 September 2014. Source: UEFA, CFA, Soccerway
A = Away; H = Home; W = Win; D = Draw; L = Loss

=== Overall ===
Competition	Started round	Current position / round	Final position / round	First match	Last match
Cypriot First Division	—	6th		01 September 2014	TBD
Cypriot Cup	2nd round	2nd round		TBD	TBD

Updated to match played 28 September 2014
Source: Competitions

=== Statistics ===
No.	Pos	Nat	Player	Total		1st Division		Cypriot Cup		Other^{1}	
No.	Pos	Nat	Player	Apps	Goals	Apps	Goals	Apps	Goals	Apps	Goals
1	GK	(Argentina) ARG	Mario Vega	1	0	1	0	0	0	0	0
2	DF	(Serbia) SRB	Marko Andić	3	0	3	0	0	0	0	0
3	DF	(Spain) ESP	Serrán Polo	5	0	5	0	0	0	0	0
5	DF	(Ghana) GHA	Razak Nuhu	5	0	5	0	0	0	0	0
6	MF	(Cyprus) CYP	Christos Marangos	2	0	2	0	0	0	0	0
7	MF	(Spain) ESP	Toni Calvo	5	2	5	2	0	0	0	0
8	MF	(Georgia (country)) GEO	Giorgi Aburjania	5	1	5	1	0	0	0	0
9	FW	(Latvia) LAT	Valērijs Šabala	3	0	3	0	0	0	0	0
10	MF	(Uruguay) URU	Gonzalo García	3	0	3	0	0	0	0	0
11	FW	(Ukraine) UKR	Yuriy Yakovenko	5	2	5	2	0	0	0	0
13	GK	(Belgium) BEL	Thomas Kaminski	3	0	3	0	0	0	0	0
15	DF	(Sweden) SWE	Markus Holgersson	4	0	4	0	0	0	0	0
16	GK	(France) FRA	Mathieu Valverde	1	0	1	0	0	0	0	0
18	MF	(Georgia (country)) GEO	Irakli Maisuradze	5	0	5	0	0	0	0	0
19	MF	(Germany) GER	Chinedu Ede	4	1	4	1	0	0	0	0
22	DF	(Cyprus) CYP	Demetris Economou	1	0	1	0	0	0	0	0
24	DF	(Cyprus) CYP	Jason Demetriou	1	0	1	0	0	0	0	0
30	MF	(Cyprus) CYP	Andreas Avraam	2	0	2	0	0	0	0	0
32	GK	(Cyprus) CYP	Gavriel Constantinou	0	0	0	0	0	0	0	0
33	FW	(Cyprus) CYP	Andreas Makris	5	1	5	1	0	0	0	0
34	MF	(Cyprus) CYP	Constantinos Laifis	4	0	4	0	0	0	0	0
35	DF	(Cyprus) CYP	Panayiotis Loizides	0	0	0	0	0	0	0	0
36	MF	(Cyprus) CYP	Adamos Andreou	0	0	0	0	0	0	0	0
37	MF	(Cyprus) CYP	Zacharias Theodorou	0	0	0	0	0	0	0	0
41	MF	(Greece) GRE	Grigoris Makos	3	0	3	0	0	0	0	0
54	MF	(Cyprus) CYP	Theofilos Chrysochos	0	0	0	0	0	0	0	0
70	MF	(Cyprus) CYP	Adamos Hadjigeorgiou	0	0	0	0	0	0	0	0
—	MF	(Cyprus) CYP	Andreas Hadjiathanasiou	0	0	0	0	0	0	0	0
—	MF	(Cyprus) CYP	Neofytos Kyriakou	0	0	0	0	0	0	0	0

^{1} Includes Cypriot super cup in season.

† denotes players that left the club during the season.

=== Goals ===
Rank	Player	Position	Goals	Cypriot Cup	Other^{1}	Total
1	(Ukraine) Yuriy Yakovenko	CF	2	0	0	2
1	(Spain) Toni Calvo	RM	2	0	0	2
2	(Germany) Chinedu Ede	LM	1	0	0	1
2	(Georgia (country)) Giorgi Aburjania	AM	1	0	0	1
2	(Cyprus) Andreas Makris	RM	1	0	0	1

^{1} Includes Cypriot super cup in season.

=== Discipline ===
N	P	Nat.	Name	1st Division			Cypriot Cup			Other^{1}			Total			Notes
N	P	Nat.	Name	Yellow card	Second yellow card	Red card	Yellow card	Second yellow card	Red card	Yellow card	Second yellow card	Red card	Yellow card	Second yellow card	Red card	Notes
34	MF	(Cyprus)	Constantinos Laifis	1		1							1		1	
2	DF	(Serbia)	Marko Andić	3									3			
7	MF	(Spain)	Toni Calvo	2									2			
18	MF	(Georgia (country))	Irakli Maisuradze	2									2			
11	FW	(Ukraine)	Yuriy Yakovenko	1									1			
5	DF	(Ghana)	Razak Nuhu	1									1			
15	DF	(Sweden)	Markus Holgersson	1									1			

Last updated: 28 September 2014
Source: Matches
Ordered by (red card) , (second yellow card) and (yellow card)
(yellow card) = Number of bookings; (second yellow card) = Number of sending offs after a second yellow card; (red card) = Number of sending offs by a direct red card.

^{1} Includes Cypriot super cup in season.

† denotes players that left the club during the season.
