= 2017–18 APOEL FC season =

APOEL
2017–18 season
- Manager: Mario Been (until 28 July 2017); Georgios Donis (from 28 July to 22 March); Bruno Baltazar (from 23 March)
- Stadium: GSP Stadium
- Cypriot First Division: 1st
- Cypriot Cup: Semi-finals
- Cypriot Super Cup: Runners-up
- UEFA Champions League: Group stage
Home colours	Away colours

The 2017–18 season was APOEL's 78th season in the Cypriot First Division and 90th year in existence as a football club. In addition to the domestic league, APOEL participated in this season's editions of the Cypriot Cup, the Cypriot Super Cup and UEFA Champions League.

== Squad ==
As of 8 March 2018

Note: Flags indicate national team as defined under FIFA eligibility rules; some limited exceptions apply. Players may hold more than one non-FIFA nationality.

No.	Pos.	Nation	Player
1	GK	MEX	Raúl Gudiño
2	DF	GEQ	Emilio Nsue
3	DF	ESP	Roberto Lago
5	DF	ESP	Jesús Rueda
6	MF	NED	Lorenzo Ebecilio
7	MF	CYP	Georgios Efrem
8	FW	BEN	Mickaël Poté
9	FW	BEL	Igor de Camargo
11	MF	CYP	Nektarios Alexandrou
13	GK	ESP	Nauzet Pérez
14	MF	AUS	Tommy Oar
16	MF	BRA	Vinícius
17	MF	NOR	Ghayas Zahid
20	MF	HUN	Roland Sallai
21	DF	BUL	Zhivko Milanov

No.	Pos.	Nation	Player
22	FW	CYP	Minas Antoniou
23	DF	BLR	Denis Polyakov
25	MF	ARG	Agustín Farías
26	MF	POR	Nuno Morais
29	DF	GRE	Praxitelis Vouros
30	DF	CYP	Giorgos Merkis
33	MF	CYP	Andreas Makris
44	DF	CYP	Nicholas Ioannou
46	MF	CYP	Efstathios Aloneftis
49	FW	BRA	Dellatorre
50	DF	BRA	Carlão
88	MF	BRA	Lucas Souza
98	GK	CYP	Andreas Paraskevas
99	GK	NED	Boy Waterman

== Transfers ==
=== Summer ===
In: Note: Flags indicate national team as defined under FIFA eligibility rules; some limited exceptions apply. Players may hold more than one non-FIFA nationality.

No.	Pos.	Nation	Player
1	GK	MEX	Raúl Gudiño (on loan from (Portugal) Porto B)
2	DF	CYP	Kypros Christoforou (from Aris Limassol, previously on loan)
5	DF	ESP	Jesús Rueda (from (Israel) Beitar Jerusalem)
8	FW	BEN	Mickaël Poté (from (Turkey) Adana Demirspor)
13	GK	ESP	Nauzet Pérez (from (Spain) Osasuna)
14	MF	AUS	Tommy Oar (from (Australia) Brisbane Roar)
17	MF	NOR	Ghayas Zahid (from (Norway) Vålerenga)
20	MF	HUN	Roland Sallai (from (Hungary) Puskás Akadémia)
22	FW	CYP	Minas Antoniou (from Aris Limassol)
25	MF	ARG	Agustín Farías (from (Chile) Palestino)
29	DF	GRE	Praxitelis Vouros (from (Greece) Olympiacos)
30	GK	VEN	Rafael Romo (from AEL Limassol)
33	FW	CYP	Andreas Makris (from (England) Walsall)
50	DF	BRA	Carlão (on loan from (Italy) Torino)
88	MF	BRA	Lucas Souza (from AEL Limassol)
93	GK	CYP	Neofytos Michael (from Nea Salamina)

Out: Note: Flags indicate national team as defined under FIFA eligibility rules; some limited exceptions apply. Players may hold more than one non-FIFA nationality.

No.	Pos.	Nation	Player
4	MF	CYP	Kostakis Artymatas (on loan to (Greece) Kerkyra)
17	FW	ESP	David Barral (to (Spain) Cádiz CF)
20	FW	CYP	Pieros Sotiriou (to (Denmark) Copenhagen)
23	DF	ESP	Iñaki Astiz (to (Poland) Legia Warsaw)
25	DF	CYP	Rafael Anastasiou (to AEK Larnaca)
30	GK	VEN	Rafael Romo (on loan to (Belgium) Beerschot Wilrijk)
33	DF	GRE	Kyriakos Aretas (to Alki Oroklini)
45	MF	CYP	Georgios Christodoulou (on loan to Pafos)
55	MF	CYP	Christos Kallis (to Alki Oroklini, previously on loan)
70	MF	GRE	Giannis Gianniotas (loan return to (Greece) Olympiacos)
77	MF	BRA	Vander Vieira (to (United Arab Emirates) Sharjah FC)
78	GK	ESP	Urko Pardo (to Alki Oroklini)
80	MF	COL	Roger Cañas (loan return to (Kazakhstan) Astana)
90	DF	CAF	Cédric Yambéré (loan return to (France) Bordeaux)
93	GK	CYP	Neofytos Michael (on loan to Aris Limassol)

=== Winter ===
In: Note: Flags indicate national team as defined under FIFA eligibility rules; some limited exceptions apply. Players may hold more than one non-FIFA nationality.

No.	Pos.	Nation	Player
2	DF	GEQ	Emilio Nsue (from (England) Birmingham City)
23	DF	BLR	Dzyanis Palyakow (from (Belarus) BATE Borisov)
49	FW	BRA	Dellatorre (from (Brazil) Atlético Paranaense)

Out: Note: Flags indicate national team as defined under FIFA eligibility rules; some limited exceptions apply. Players may hold more than one non-FIFA nationality.

No.	Pos.	Nation	Player

== Competitions ==
=== Overview ===
Competition	First match	Last match	Starting round	Final position	Record							
Competition	First match	Last match	Starting round	Final position	Pld	W	D	L	GF	GA	GD	Win %
Cypriot First Division	9 September 2017	12 May 2018	Matchday 1	Winners	36	27	5	4	92	35	+57	75.00
Cypriot Cup	10 January 2018	25 April 2018	Second round	Semi-finals	6	3	1	2	13	7	+6	50.00
Cypriot Super Cup	9 August 2017		Final	Runners-up	1	0	0	1	1	2	−1	0.00
UEFA Champions League	12 July 2017	6 December 2017	Second qualifying round	Group stage	12	4	3	5	10	18	−8	33.33
Total					55	34	9	12	116	62	+54	61.82

Source: Competitions

=== Cypriot Super Cup ===
9 August 2017 Final	APOEL	1–2	Apollon Limassol	Nicosia
20:00 EEST (UTC+3)	Pardo (yellow card) 5'; Efrem 9'; Farías (yellow card) 28'; Alexandrou (yellow card) 86'	Report	Vasiliou (yellow card) 55' (yellow-red card) 71'; Da Silva 79'; Schembri 87'; Vale (yellow card) 90+3'	Stadium: GSP Stadium; Referee: Demetris Masias

=== Cypriot First Division ===
==== Results summary ====
Overall								Home						Away					
Pld	W	D	L	GF	GA	GD	Pts	W	D	L	GF	GA	GD	W	D	L	GF	GA	GD
36	27	5	4	92	35	+57	86	15	1	2	50	18	+32	12	4	2	42	17	+25

Source: Competitions

==== Regular season ====
===== League table =====
Pos	Team	Pld	W	D	L	GF	GA	GD	Pts	Qualification or relegation
1	APOEL	26	20	3	3	72	25	+47	63	Qualification for the Championship round
2	Apollon Limassol	26	18	7	1	67	15	+52	61	Qualification for the Championship round
3	Anorthosis Famagusta	26	16	8	2	41	17	+24	56	Qualification for the Championship round
4	AEK Larnaca	26	16	5	5	57	24	+33	53	Qualification for the Championship round
5	AEL Limassol	26	14	6	6	35	17	+18	48	Qualification for the Championship round

Source: CFA (in Greek)
Rules for classification: 1) Points; 2) Head-to-head points; 3) Head-to-head goal difference; 4) Head-to-head goals scored; 5) Head-to-head away goals scored (only if two teams); 6) Goal difference; 7) Goals scored; 8) Play-off (only if deciding championship round, relegation round or relegation).

===== Matches =====
9 September 2017 3	Nea Salamis Famagusta	1–4	APOEL	Larnaca
20:00 EEST (UTC+3)	Damahou 6'	Report	Sallai 27'; De Camargo 57' (pen.), 72'; Poté 86'	Stadium: Ammochostos Stadium; Referee: Loukas Soteriou

18 September 2017 4	APOEL	0–1	Anorthosis Famagusta	Nicosia
19:00 EEST (UTC+3)	Lago (red card) 90+5'	Report	João Victor 30', (yellow card) 90+3'; Abdullahi (yellow card) 59'; Cissé (yellow card) 61'	Stadium: GSP Stadium; Referee: Vasilis Demetriou

22 September 2017 5	Aris Limassol	0–0	APOEL	Limassol
19:00 EEST (UTC+3)		Report		Stadium: Tsirio Stadium; Referee: Yiannis Anastasiou

1 October 2017 6	Alki Oroklini	0–1	APOEL	Larnaca
20:00 EEST (UTC+3)		Report	Zahid 90+1'	Stadium: Ammochostos Stadium; Referee: Leontios Trattos

13 October 2017 7	APOEL	2–0	Doxa Katokopias	Nicosia
19:00 EEST (UTC+3)	Poté 30'; De Camargo 87'	Report		Stadium: GSP Stadium; Referee: Timotheos Christofi

21 October 2017 8	AEK Larnaca	3–1	APOEL	Larnaca
20:00 EEST (UTC+3)	Taulemesse 32', 44'; Barrera 84'	Report	Sallai 62'	Stadium: AEK Arena – Georgios Karapatakis; Referee: Demetris Masias

28 October 2017 10	Ethnikos Achna	1–1	APOEL	Achna
18:00 EEST (UTC+3)	Kyprianou 11'	Report	Poté 65'	Stadium: Dasaki Stadium; Referee: Loukas Soteriou

5 November 2017 11	APOEL	4–0	Pafos FC	Nicosia
16:00 EET (UTC+2)	Poté 37', 55'; Makris 87', 90'	Report		Stadium: GSP Stadium; Referee: Vasilis Demetriou

17 November 2017 12	Omonia	1–3	APOEL	Nicosia
19:00 EET (UTC+2)	Vouros 80' (o.g.); Lopes (yellow card) 89'	Report	Sallai (yellow card) 49'; Carlão (yellow card) 58'; Efrem 66', 77'; Pérez (yellow card) 90+3'; Efrem 90+5'	Stadium: GSP Stadium; Referee: Leontios Trattos

25 November 2017 13	APOEL	6–1	Olympiakos Nicosia	Nicosia
18:00 EET (UTC+2)	Ebecilio 2'; Sallai 22', 69'; De Camargo 24', 81'; Zahid 41'	Report	Castro 56'	Stadium: GSP Stadium; Referee: Giorgos Nikolaou

29 November 2017 1	Ermis Aradippou	0–4	APOEL	Larnaca
19:00 EET (UTC+2)		Report	Poté 39'; Aloneftis 52'; Lago 87'; Antoniou 89'	Stadium: GSZ Stadium; Referee: Neofytos Neofytou

2 December 2017 14	APOEL	2–1	Ermis Aradippou	Nicosia
17:00 EET (UTC+2)	Ebecilio 5'; Sallai 80'	Report	Damchevski 6'	Stadium: GSP Stadium; Referee: Avraam Tsoukkas

11 December 2017 15	AEL Limassol	0–0	APOEL	Limassol
20:00 EET (UTC+2)		Report		Stadium: Tsirio Stadium; Referee: Demetris Masias

16 December 2017 16	APOEL	2–1	Nea Salamis Famagusta	Nicosia
19:00 EET (UTC+2)	Damahou 71' (o.g.); Zahid 88'	Report	Brígido 59'	Stadium: GSP Stadium; Referee: Giorgos Nikolaou

20 December 2017 17	Anorthosis Famagusta	0–3	APOEL	Larnaca
19:00 EET (UTC+2)	Gadzhev (yellow card) 37'; João Victor (yellow card) 71'	Report	Poté 1'; Souza (yellow card) 11'; Morais (yellow card) 54'; Ebecilio 58'; De Camargo 85'; Lago (yellow card) 90+2'	Stadium: Antonis Papadopoulos Stadium; Referee: Leontios Trattou

3 January 2018 18	APOEL	5–2	Aris Limassol	Nicosia
17:00 EET (UTC+2)	Morais 3' (pen.), 69' (pen.); De Camargo 29', 46'; Ebecilio 82'	Report	Ngolok 24'; Ioniță 35'	Stadium: GSP Stadium; Referee: Christos Nicolaides

7 January 2018 19	APOEL	4–0	Alki Oroklini	Nicosia
18:00 EET (UTC+2)	Ebecilio 9'; Morais 28' (pen.); Sallai 32'; De Camargo 37'	Report		Stadium: GSP Stadium; Referee: Yiannis Anastasiou

14 January 2018 20	Doxa Katokopias	0–8	APOEL	Nicosia
15:00 EET (UTC+2)	Poutziouris (yellow card) 3'	Report	Morais 4' (pen.); Zahid 15'; Nsue 26'; Efrem 34', 59', 84'; De Camargo 51'; Makris 57'	Stadium: Makario Stadium; Referee: Demetris Masias

17 January 2018 2	APOEL	2–1	AEL Limassol	Nicosia
17:30 EET (UTC+2)	Poté 45'; Morais 78' (pen.)	Report	Lafrance 43'	Stadium: GSP Stadium; Referee: Vasilis Demetriou

21 January 2018 21	APOEL	3–1	AEK Larnaca	Nicosia
16:00 EET (UTC+2)	Morais 31' (pen.); Efrem 76'; Nsue 90+2'	Report	Taulemesse 20'	Stadium: GSP Stadium; Referee: Demetris Masias

24 January 2018 9	APOEL	0–4	Apollon Limassol	Nicosia
18:00 EET (UTC+2)		Report	Zelaya 4'; Jakoliš 10'; Papoulis 14'; Maglica 48'	Stadium: GSP Stadium; Referee: Loukas Soteriou

31 January 2018 22	Apollon Limassol	1–2	APOEL	Limassol
17:00 EET (UTC+2)	Maglica 26'	Report	Zahid 45+4'; Nsue 52'	Stadium: Tsirio Stadium; Referee: Vasilis Demetriou

6 February 2018 23	APOEL	7–1	Ethnikos Achna	Nicosia
18:00 EET (UTC+2)	Nsue 35', 67'; De Camargo 53'; Zahid 75'; Morais 80' (pen.); Farías 88'; Dellatorre 90+2'	Report	Elia 21'; Ioannou (yellow card) 87'; Bogatinov (yellow card) 90+2'	Stadium: GSP Stadium; Referee: Andreas Konstantinou

11 February 2018 24	Pafos FC	2–3	APOEL	Paphos
15:00 EET (UTC+2)	Bérigaud 64', 79'	Report	Zahid 32'; Dellatorre 48'; Souza 90+3'	Stadium: Stelios Kyriakides Stadium; Referee: Christos Nicolaides

17 February 2018 25	APOEL	2–1	Omonia	Nicosia
17:00 EET (UTC+2)	Ebecilio 4', 14', (yellow card) 68'; Sallai (yellow card) 34'; Nsue (yellow card) 51'	Report	Jaílson (yellow card) 34'; Derbyshire 39', (yellow card) 45+3'; Candé (yellow card) 51'; Vyntra (yellow card) 57'; Soares (yellow card) 57'; Kanu (yellow card) 62'; Solomon (yellow card) 82'	Stadium: GSP Stadium; Referee: Vasilis Demetriou

24 February 2018 26	Olympiakos Nicosia	2–3	APOEL	Nicosia
18:00 EET (UTC+2)	Sotiriou 49'; Torres 90+4'	Report	Sallai 33'; Dellatorre 78'; Ioannou 90+6'	Stadium: Makario Stadium; Referee: Neofytos Neofytou

==== Championship round ====
===== League table =====
Pos	Team	Pld	W	D	L	GF	GA	GD	Pts	Qualification
1	APOEL (C)	36	27	5	4	92	35	+57	86	Qualification for the Champions League first qualifying round
2	Apollon Limassol	36	25	7	4	90	26	+64	82	Qualification for the Europa League first qualifying round
3	Anorthosis Famagusta	36	19	12	5	53	29	+24	69	Qualification for the Europa League first qualifying round
4	AEK Larnaca	36	20	8	8	74	39	+35	68	Qualification for the Europa League second qualifying round (Note: AEK Larnaca qualified for the Europa League second qualifying round by winning the 2017–18 Cypriot Cup.)
5	AEL Limassol	36	17	7	12	47	38	+9	58	
6	Omonia	36	14	5	17	58	60	−2	47	

Source: CFA (in Greek)
Rules for classification: 1) Points; 2) Head-to-head points; 3) Head-to-head goal difference; 4) Head-to-head goals scored; 5) Head-to-head away goals scored (only if two teams); 6) Goal difference; 7) Goals scored; 8) Play-off (only if deciding champion or UEFA competitions).
(C) Champions

===== Matches =====
4 March 2018 27	Omonia	0–2	APOEL	Nicosia
15:00 EET (UTC+2)	Candé (yellow card) 15'; Breeveld (yellow card) 41'; Antonia (yellow card) 42'; Kanu (yellow card) 83'	Report	Zahid (yellow card) 1'; Poté (yellow card) 8'; Sallai (yellow card) 31'; Souza 63'; Dellatorre 90+1'	Stadium: GSP Stadium; Referee: Timotheos Christofi

4 March 2018 28	APOEL	0–0	AEK Larnaca	Nicosia
16:00 EET (UTC+2)		Report		Stadium: GSP Stadium; Referee: Loukas Soteriou

18 March 2018 29	Apollon Limassol	4–2	APOEL	Limassol
16:00 EET (UTC+2)	Maglica 15'; João Pedro 31'; Papoulis 66' (pen.), 78'	Report	Poté 41'; Aloneftis 86'	Stadium: Tsirio Stadium; Referee: Leontios Trattou

31 March 2018 30	APOEL	3–1	AEL Limassol	Nicosia
17:00 EEST (UTC+3)	De Camargo 81', 86'; Morais 90+4' (pen.)	Report	Dossa Júnior 90'	Stadium: GSP Stadium; Referee: Yiannis Anastasiou

4 April 2018 31	Anorthosis Famagusta	0–0	APOEL	Larnaca
17:00 EEST (UTC+3)	Ďuriš (yellow card) 20'; Schildenfeld (yellow card) 23'	Report	Morais (yellow card) 14'; Ebecilio (yellow card) 60'	Stadium: Antonis Papadopoulos Stadium; Referee: Giorgos Nikolaou

15 April 2018 32	APOEL	4–1	Omonia	Nicosia
19:00 EEST (UTC+3)	Souza 11'; Sallai 23'; Ebecilio (yellow card) 52', (goal) 82'; Nsue 90+4'	Report	Jaílson 39'; Soares (yellow card) 51'; Christofi (yellow card) 52'; Derbyshire (yellow card) 53'; Vyntra (red card) 90+3'	Stadium: GSP Stadium; Referee: Christos Nicolaides

22 April 2018 33	AEK Larnaca	1–3	APOEL	Larnaca
19:00 EEST (UTC+3)	Joan Tomàs 60'	Report	Morais 11' (pen.); Sallai 50'; Zahid 78'	Stadium: AEK Arena – Georgios Karapatakis; Referee: Giorgos Nikolaou

29 April 2018 34	APOEL	2–1	Apollon Limassol	Nicosia
19:00 EEST (UTC+3)	De Camargo 20', 62'	Report	Maglica 10'	Stadium: GSP Stadium; Referee: Vasilis Demetriou

5 May 2018 35	AEL Limassol	1–2	APOEL	Limassol
19:00 EEST (UTC+3)	Ilia 11', (yellow card) 60'	Report	Dellatorre 16'; Poté 45+2'	Stadium: Tsirio Stadium; Referee: Demetris Masias

12 May 2018 36	APOEL	2–1	Anorthosis Famagusta	Nicosia
19:00 EEST (UTC+3)	Nsue 43'; Pérez (yellow card) 76'; Aloneftis (yellow card) 89'; Poté 89', (yellow card) 89'	Report	Carlitos (yellow card) 10'; Palanca 25', (yellow card) 30'; Igiebor (yellow card) 56'; João Victor (yellow card) 71'; Struna (yellow card) 76'	Stadium: GSP Stadium; Referee: Timotheos Christofi

=== Cypriot Cup ===
==== Second round ====
10 January 2018 First leg	Ermis Aradippou	0–2	APOEL	Larnaca
19:00 EET (UTC+2)		Report	Ebecilio 28'; Bertoglio 57'	Stadium: GSZ Stadium; Referee: Nikolas Neokleous

21 February 2018 Second leg	APOEL	5–1 (7–1 agg.)	Ermis Aradippou	Nicosia
19:00 EET (UTC+2)	Poté 7'; Makris 45+1'; Farías (yellow card) 56'; Ebecilio (yellow card) 62'; Dellatorre 75', 79', 90'	Report	Monteiro 14'; Artabe (yellow card) 26'; Tsoumou (yellow card) 49'; Zaharia (yellow card) 54'	Stadium: GSP Stadium; Referee: Loukas Soteriou
Note: APOEL won 7–1 on aggregate.

==== Quarter-finals ====
7 March 2018 First leg	Nea Salamis Famagusta	0–3	APOEL	Larnaca
17:00 EET (UTC+2)		Report	Dellatorre 9'; De Camargo 24', 53'	Stadium: Ammochostos Stadium; Referee: Nikolas Neokleous

7 March 2018 First leg	APOEL	2–2 (5–2 agg.)	Nea Salamis Famagusta	Nicosia
19:00 EET (UTC+2)	De Camargo 10'; Dellatorre 88'	Report	Makriev 57'; Kyprianou 82' (pen.)	Stadium: GSP Stadium; Referee: Kostas Psevdiotis
Note: APOEL won 5–2 on aggregate.

==== Semi-finals ====
18 April 2018 First leg	AEK Larnaca	2–0	APOEL	Larnaca
19:00 EEST (UTC+3)	Hevel 15'; Giannou 83'	Report		Stadium: AEK Arena – Georgios Karapatakis; Referee: Leontios Trattou

25 April 2018 Second leg	APOEL	1–2 (1–4 agg.)	AEK Larnaca	Nicosia
18:00 EEST (UTC+3)	De Camargo 31'	Report	Taulemesse 57'; Català 73'	Stadium: GSP Stadium; Referee: Demetris Masias
Note: AEK Larnaca won 4–1 on aggregate.

=== UEFA Champions League ===
==== Qualifying rounds ====
===== Second qualifying round =====
12 July 2017 First leg	APOEL (Cyprus)	1–0	(Luxembourg) F91 Dudelange	Nicosia, Cyprus
20:00 EEST (UTC+3)	Bertoglio 71'; Vander (yellow card) 75'; Ebecilio (yellow card) 88'	Report	Malget (yellow card) 30'; Turpel (yellow card) 48'; Jordanov (yellow card) 52'	Stadium: GSP Stadium; Attendance: 9,600; Referee: Alan Mario Sant (Malta)

19 July 2017 Second leg	F91 Dudelange (Luxembourg)	0–1 (0–2 agg.)	(Cyprus) APOEL	Dudelange, Luxembourg
18:00 CEST (UTC+2)	Turpel (yellow card) 53'	Report	De Camargo 40' (pen.); Vander (yellow card) 77'; Poté (yellow card) 90+1'	Stadium: Stade Jos Nosbaum; Attendance: 1,458; Referee: Nikola Dabanović (Montenegro)
Note: APOEL won 2–0 on aggregate.

===== Third qualifying round =====
26 July 2017 First leg	Viitorul Constanța (Romania)	1–0	(Cyprus) APOEL	Ovidiu, Romania
21:00 EEST (UTC+3)	Constantin (yellow card) 27'; Țucudean (yellow card) 63' (yellow-red card) 90+3'; Ganea 75'; Nedelcu (yellow card) 90'	Report	Bertoglio (yellow card) 65'; Merkis (yellow card) 74'	Stadium: Stadionul Viitorul; Attendance: 3,873; Referee: Paolo Valeri (Italy)

2 August 2017 Second leg	APOEL (Cyprus)	4–0 (a.e.t.) (4–1 agg.)	(Romania) Viitorul Constanța	Nicosia, Cyprus
20:00 EEST (UTC+3)	Vinícius (yellow card) 44'; Carlão 54'; Ebecilio (yellow card) 88'; Merkis 93'; De Camargo 94'; Efrem 105+1'; Morais (yellow card) 112'; Milanov (yellow card) 119'	Report	Boli (yellow card) 31'; Țîru (yellow card) 69'; Eric (yellow card) 98'; Herea (yellow card) 119'	Stadium: GSP Stadium; Attendance: 13,647; Referee: Aleksei Eskov (Russia)
Note: APOEL won 4–1 on aggregate.

==== Play-off round ====
15 August 2017 First leg	APOEL (Cyprus)	2–0	(Czech Republic) Slavia Prague	Nicosia, Cyprus
21:45 EEST (UTC+3)	De Camargo 2', (yellow card) 53'; Aloneftis 10'; Carlão (yellow card) 77'	Report	Rotan (yellow card) 6'	Stadium: GSP Stadium; Attendance: 13,073; Referee: Antonio Mateu Lahoz (Spain)

23 August 2017 Second leg	Slavia Prague (Czech Republic)	0–0 (0–2 agg.)	(Cyprus) APOEL	Prague, Czech Republic
20:45 CEST (UTC+2)	Hušbauer (yellow card) 19'; Mešanović (yellow card) 61'; Souček (yellow card) 80'	Report	Vinícius (yellow card) 21'; De Camargo (yellow card) 39'	Stadium: Eden Arena; Attendance: 18,844; Referee: Milorad Mažić (Serbia)
Note: APOEL won 2–0 on aggregate.

==== Group stage ====
Pos	Team	Pld	W	D	L	GF	GA	GD	Pts	Qualification	TOT	RMA	DOR	APO
1	(England) Tottenham Hotspur	6	5	1	0	15	4	+11	16	Advance to knockout phase	—	3–1	3–1	3–0
2	(Spain) Real Madrid	6	4	1	1	17	7	+10	13	Advance to knockout phase	1–1	—	3–2	3–0
3	(Germany) Borussia Dortmund	6	0	2	4	7	13	−6	2 (Note: Head-to-head results: APOEL 1–1 Borussia Dortmund, Borussia Dortmund 1–1 APOEL (tied on head-to-head results, ranked on total goal difference).)	Transfer to Europa League	1–2	1–3	—	1–1
4	(Cyprus) APOEL	6	0	2	4	2	17	−15	2		0–3	0–6	1–1	—

Source: UEFA
Rules for classification: Group stage tiebreakers
Notes:

13 September 2017 1	Real Madrid (Spain)	3–0	(Cyprus) APOEL	Madrid, Spain
20:45 CEST (UTC+2)	Ronaldo 12', 51' (pen.); Carvajal (yellow card) 52'; Ramos 61'	Report	Sallai (yellow card) 53'; Ebecilio (yellow card) 63'; Farías (yellow card) 90'	Stadium: Santiago Bernabéu; Attendance: 71,060; Referee: Benoît Bastien (France)

26 September 2017 2	APOEL (Cyprus)	0–3	(England) Tottenham Hotspur	Nicosia, Cyprus
19:45 BST (UTC+1)	Waterman (yellow card) 39'; Vinícius (yellow card) 51'	Report	Kane 39', 62', 67'; Winks (yellow card) 85'	Stadium: GSP Stadium; Attendance: 16,324; Referee: Pavel Královec (Czech Republic)

17 October 2017 3	APOEL (Cyprus)	1–1	(Germany) Borussia Dortmund	Nicosia, Cyprus
21:45 EEST (UTC+3)	Ebecilio (yellow card) 20'; Poté 62', (yellow card) 87'; Sallai (yellow card) 88'	Report	Papastathopoulos 67', (yellow card) 87'; Toljan (yellow card) 77'; Weigl (yellow card) 84'	Stadium: GSP Stadium; Attendance: 15,604; Referee: Aleksei Kulbakov (Belarus)

1 November 2017 4	Borussia Dortmund (Germany)	1–1	(Cyprus) APOEL	Dortmund, Germany
20:45 CET (UTC+1)	Guerreiro 29'	Report	Poté 51'; Carlão (yellow card) 72'; Vouros (yellow card) 90+1'; Pérez (yellow card) 90+3'	Stadium: Westfalenstadion; Attendance: 64,500; Referee: Matej Jug (Slovenia)

21 November 2017 5	APOEL (Cyprus)	0–6	(Spain) Real Madrid	Nicosia, Cyprus
21:45 EET (UTC+2)		Report	Modrić 23'; Benzema 39', 45+1'; Nacho 41'; Ronaldo 49', 54'; Carvajal (yellow card) 90'	Stadium: GSP Stadium; Attendance: 19,705; Referee: Artur Soares Dias (Portugal)

6 December 2017 6	Tottenham Hotspur (England)	3–0	(Cyprus) APOEL	London, England
19:45 GMT (UTC)	Llorente 20'; Son 37'; Aurier (yellow card) 64'; Rose (yellow card) 67'; Nkoudou 80'	Report	Sallai (yellow card) 68'; Rueda (yellow card) 83'	Stadium: Wembley Stadium; Attendance: 42,679; Referee: Slavko Vinčić (Slovenia)
