= Andreas Makris (footballer) =

Cypriot footballer

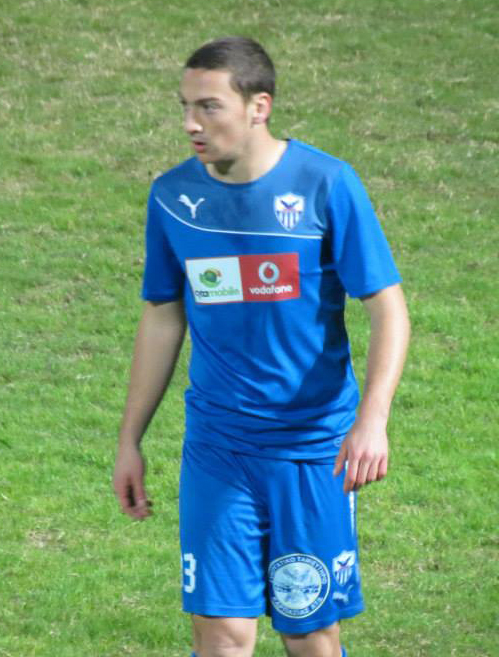
- Andreas Makris during a match against Ermis Aradippou in 2013

Personal information
- Full name: Andreas Makris
- Date of birth: 27 November 1995 (age 30)
- Place of birth: Paphos, Cyprus
- Height: 1.71 m (5 ft 7 1/2 in)
- Position: Winger

Team information
- Current team: AEL
- Number: 33

Youth career
- Arsenal Soccer School Cyprus
- 2007–2008: Atromitos Yeroskipou
- 2008–2012: AEP Paphos

Senior career*
| Years | Team | Apps | (Gls) |
| 2012–2013 | AEP Paphos | 14 | (2) |
| 2013–2016 | Anorthosis Famagusta | 83 | (18) |
| 2016–2017 | Walsall | 32 | (1) |
| 2017–2020 | APOEL Nicosia | 11 | (3) |
| 2018–2019 | → AEL Limassol (loan) | 24 | (5) |
| 2020–2022 | AEK Larnaca | 30 | (4) |
| 2022 | Olympiakos Nicosia | 11 | (2) |
| 2022–2026 | AEL Limassol | 118 | (24) |
| 2026– | AEL | 3 | (1) |

International career^{‡}
| 2011–2013 | Cyprus U17 | 1 | (0) |
| 2013–2014 | Cyprus U19 | 8 | (4) |
| 2015 | Cyprus U21 | 2 | (1) |
| 2014–2024 | Cyprus | 28 | (0) |
- * Club domestic league appearances and goals as of 21 September 2026 ‡ National team caps and goals as of 21:00, 18 November 2024 (UTC)

Andreas Makris (Greek: Ανδρέας Μακρής; born 27 November 1995) is a Cypriot professional footballer who plays as a winger for Greek Super League 2 club AEL.

== Early life ==
Makris was born in Paphos, Cyprus in November 1995. His father, Tasos Makris, played professional football for Evagoras Paphos and his brother, Christos, also plays football in the Cypriot lower divisions.

Makris began his football career playing in the Olympic youth academies of Paphos before moving to the Arsenal soccer school of Paphos. He made a step up in 2007, signing for Cypriot Second Division side Atromitos Yeroskipou's youth academy when he was twelve-years-old. He had further youth trials for AEK Athens and AC Milan during this period but neither materialised and he moved to AEP Paphos in 2008.

== Club career ==
=== AEP Paphos ===
After progressing through the youth teams at his hometown club, Makris played a full season for the "B" team in 2011–12 and scored 21 goals. This earned him a place in the first team for the 2012–13 season at the age of just 16.

Makris made his professional debut as a 54th-minute substitute in a 4–2 away defeat to Omonia Nicosia on 24 November 2012, just three days before his 17th birthday.

He scored his first goal for AEP Paphos, a 90th-minute consolation, in a 3–1 defeat against Olympiakos Nicosia on 9 December 2012. In his first full season in the First Division Makris played 14 games and scored 2 goals.

=== Anorthosis Famagusta ===
Makris moved to Anorthosis for the 2013-14 season.

Makris made his debut for Anorthosis as a substitute in a 3–0 away victory over Nea Salamis on 30 November 2013. He scored his first goal for his new club against Alki Larnaca on 11 January 2014.

His impressive form attracted the interest of Real Madrid C, but no agreement was reached because the player could not leave the country because of the need to complete his national military service. By the end of the 2013–14 season, coaches in the Cypriot First Division had voted Makris as the best youth player in the league and he had attracted interest from European giants Juventus, Borussia Dortmund and Everton.

Makris continued his impressive form into the 2014–15 season, starting regularly for Anorthosis and contributing more goals and assists. After scoring two goals against Doxa Katokopias on 22 November 2014, he signed a new long-term contract with the club, stating "I'll give it all for Anorthosis." He won the Player of the Month award for January and was voted into the Team of the Season for 2014–15, as one of the best three forwards in the league. Makris scored 13 goals in 30 league appearances.

In the 2015–16 season, Makris was less successful in front of goal, scoring only 5 goals but did make another 32 appearances for Anorthosis and contributed to the team finishing in third place in the Cypriot First Division.

=== Walsall ===
In August 2016, after three seasons with Anorthosis, Makris moved away from Cyprus for the first time and signed for English side Walsall. The transfer was a club record fee for the League One side, believed to be in the region of €300,000.

Makris made his debut for Walsall in a League Cup tie against Yeovil Town at Bescot Stadium on 9 August 2016. He struggled to hold down a regular place in the starting line-up for the Saddlers and did not find the net for his new team until his 31st appearance on 8 April 2017, when he scored a half-volley in a 1–1 draw with Oxford United. This proved to be his first and last goal for the club.

=== APOEL Nicosia ===
On 13 June 2017, it was announced that Makris would be leaving Walsall after just a single season to return to Cyprus, joining APOEL Nicosia for a fee in the region of €200,000.

== International career ==
In October 2013, Makris was a member of the team that qualified to UEFA European Under-19 Championship elite round. He played 3 matches and he scored 4 goals. He was the runner-up of the top scorers in the competition. He scored 1 goal in the match against Czech Republic, 2 goals against Croatia and 1 goal against Gibraltar.

On 27 February 2014, Pambos Christodoulou called Makris to the first team of Cyprus national team for the friendly against Northern Ireland.

Makris made his team debut with Cyprus national team as an 85th-minute substitute in a 0–0 home draw against Northern Ireland on 6 March 2014.

On 25 May 2014, Makris took a part to UEFA European Under-19 Championship elite round, he played in all 3 matches, without scoring any goal. Cyprus took the 4th place in the group with 0 pts.

On 10 October 2014, Makris played in the starting line up of Cyprus national football team against Israel, when Cyprus defeated 1–2 in the GSP Stadium.

On 16 November 2014, Makris played for 44 minutes against Andorra when he changed Stathis Aloneftis at the beginning of the second half in the home victory 5–0.

== Career statistics ==
=== Club ===
As of match played 28 January 2025

Appearances and goals by club, season and competition
| Club | Season | League | | | National cup (Note: Includes Cypriot Cup, FA Cup) | | League cup (Note: Includes EFL Cup) | | Europe | | Other | | Total | |
| Club | Season | Division | Apps | Goals | Apps | Goals | Apps | Goals | Apps | Goals | Apps | Goals | Apps | Goals |
|---|---|---|---|---|---|---|---|---|---|---|---|---|---|---|
| AEP Paphos | 2012–13 | Cypriot First Division | 14 | 2 | 3 | 0 | — | | — | | — | | 17 | 2 |
| Anorthosis Famagusta | 2013–14 | Cypriot First Division | 25 | 2 | 2 | 1 | — | | 0 | 0 | — | | 27 | 3 |
| Anorthosis Famagusta | 2014–15 | Cypriot First Division | 30 | 13 | 2 | 0 | — | | — | | — | | 32 | 13 |
| Anorthosis Famagusta | 2015–16 | Cypriot First Division | 28 | 3 | 4 | 2 | — | | — | | — | | 32 | 5 |
| Anorthosis Famagusta | Total | | 83 | 18 | 8 | 3 | — | | 0 | 0 | — | | 91 | 21 |
| Walsall | 2016–17 | EFL League One | 32 | 1 | 1 | 0 | 1 | 0 | — | | 1 (Note: Appearance in EFL Trophy) | 0 | 35 | 1 |
| APOEL | 2017–18 | Cypriot First Division | 6 | 3 | 5 | 1 | — | | 1 (Note: Appearance in UEFA Champions League) | 0 | 1 (Note: Appearance in Cypriot Super Cup) | 0 | 13 | 4 |
| APOEL | 2018–19 | Cypriot First Division | 0 | 0 | 0 | 0 | — | | 0 | 0 | — | | 0 | 0 |
| APOEL | 2019–20 | Cypriot First Division | 5 | 0 | 1 | 0 | — | | 1 (Note: Appearance in UEFA Europa League) | 0 | — | | 3 | 0 |
| APOEL | Total | | 11 | 3 | 6 | 1 | — | | 2 | 0 | 1 | 0 | 20 | 4 |
| AEL Limassol (loan) | 2018–19 | Cypriot First Division | 24 | 5 | 3 | 0 | — | | — | | — | | 27 | 5 |
| AEK Larnaca | 2020–21 | Cypriot First Division | 28 | 4 | 1 | 1 | — | | — | | — | | 29 | 5 |
| AEK Larnaca | 2021–22 | Cypriot First Division | 2 | 0 | 2 | 0 | — | | — | | — | | 4 | 0 |
| AEK Larnaca | Total | | 30 | 4 | 3 | 1 | — | | — | | — | | 33 | 5 |
| Olympiakos Nicosia | 2021–22 | Cypriot First Division | 11 | 2 | 1 | 0 | — | | — | | — | | 12 | 2 |
| AEL Limassol | 2022–23 | Cypriot First Division | 23 | 2 | 4 | 0 | — | | — | | — | | 27 | 2 |
| AEL Limassol | 2023–24 | Cypriot First Division | 36 | 9 | 1 | 0 | — | | — | | — | | 37 | 9 |
| AEL Limassol | 2024–25 | Cypriot First Division | 19 | 9 | 2 | 0 | — | | — | | — | | 19 | 9 |
| AEL Limassol | Total | | 78 | 20 | 7 | 0 | — | | — | | — | | 85 | 20 |
| Career total | | | 284 | 55 | 32 | 5 | 1 | 0 | 2 | 0 | 2 | 0 | 321 | 60 |

=== International ===
As of match played 11 June 2019

Appearances and goals by national team and year
| National team | Year | Apps | Goals |
|---|---|---|---|
| Cyprus | 2014 | 4 | 0 |
| Cyprus | 2015 | 4 | 0 |
| Cyprus | 2016 | 5 | 0 |
| Cyprus | 2017 | 4 | 0 |
| Cyprus | 2018 | 2 | 0 |
| Cyprus | 2019 | 4 | 0 |
| Cyprus | 2020 | 1 | 0 |
| Total | | 24 | 0 |

== Honours ==
=== Individual ===
- Cypriot Teen Athlete of the Year: 2013
- Cypriot Youth Player of the Year: 2013–14
- Cypriot First Division Team of the Year: 2014–15
- Cypriot First Division Player of the Month: January 2015
