= Konstantinos Laifis =

Cypriot footballer (born 1993)

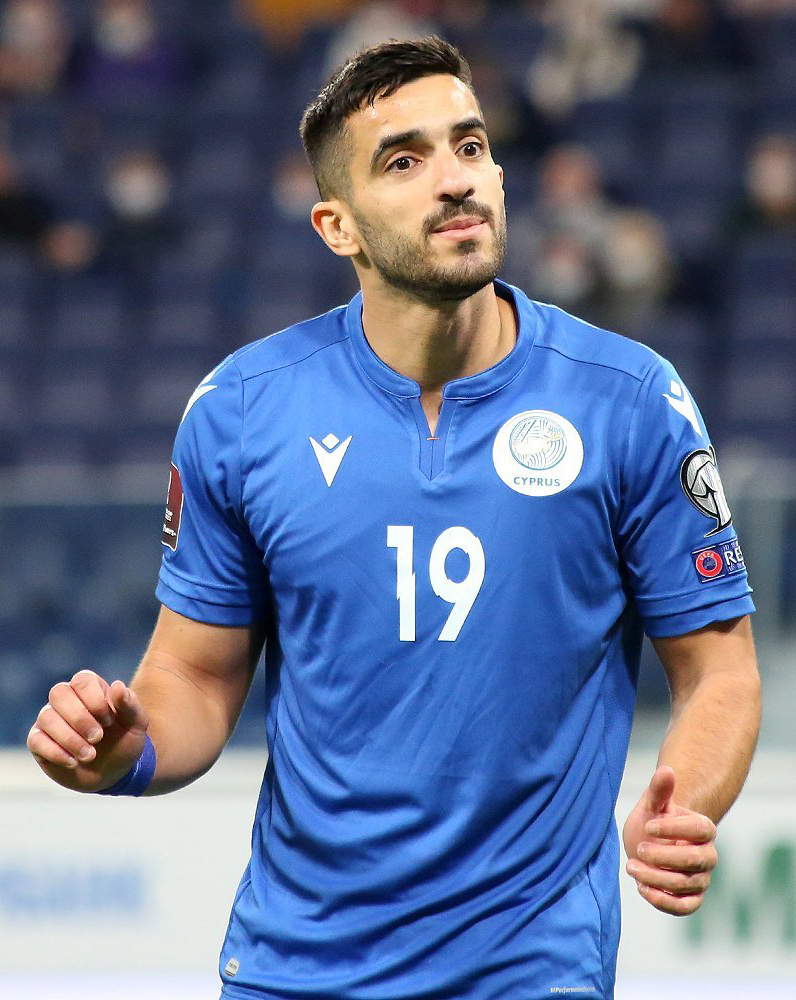
- Konstantinos Laifis

Personal information
- Full name: Konstantinos Laifis
- Date of birth: 19 May 1993 (age 33)
- Place of birth: Paralimni, Cyprus
- Height: 1.86 m (6 ft 1 in)
- Position: Centre-back

Team information
- Current team: APOEL
- Number: 34

Youth career
- 2007–2009: Enosis Neon Paralimni
- 2009–2012: Nottingham Forest

Senior career*
| Years | Team | Apps | (Gls) |
| 2012–2016 | Anorthosis | 63 | (8) |
| 2013 | → Alki Larnaca (loan) | 15 | (1) |
| 2016–2018 | Olympiacos | 0 | (0) |
| 2016–2018 | → Standard Liège (loan) | 68 | (2) |
| 2018–2024 | Standard Liège | 172 | (10) |
| 2024– | APOEL | 62 | (7) |

International career^{‡}
| 2009–2010 | Cyprus U17 | | |
| 2010–2012 | Cyprus U19 | 8 | (0) |
| 2013–2014 | Cyprus U21 | 6 | (0) |
| 2014– | Cyprus | 73 | (5) |
- * Club domestic league appearances and goals as of 14 June 2026 ‡ National team caps and goals as of 20:50, 15 November 2026 (UTC)

Konstantinos Laifis (Greek: Κωνσταντίνος Λαΐφης; born 19 May 1993) is a Cypriot professional footballer who plays as a centre-back for Cypriot First Division club APOEL and the Cyprus national team.

== Early life and career ==
Laifis was born in Paralimni. As a boy, he played tennis to a good standard, and played football for the junior teams of his local club, Enosis Neon Paralimni. When he was 16, he took up an apprenticeship with English club Nottingham Forest's youth academy, together with several other Cypriot players. In his second year, he played increasingly regularly for the under-18 team and scored once as Forest finished second in their section of the FA Premier Academy League. He remained with the club into a third year, but returned to Cyprus in late 2011, where he trained with Anorthosis Famagusta and then agreed a short-term contract with them. His contract with Forest was cancelled by mutual consent, and he formally signed for Anorthosis in the January 2012 transfer window.

=== Anorthosis Famagusta ===
Laifis made his first-team debut for Anorthosis the next month, in their 2011–12 Cypriot Cup second round second-leg match against Second Division club APOP Kinyras, as a 61st-minute substitute for Vincent Laban. That was his last competitive appearance until July 2013, when injuries to Valentinos Sielis and Andreas Avraam left a vacancy at left back for pre-season friendlies. Laifis performed well enough to be given a place in the starting eleven for the second leg of the second qualifying round match against Allsvenskan club Gefle. He played the full 90 minutes as Anorthosis let slip a 3–0 lead from the first leg and were eliminated 4–3 on aggregate.

=== Alki Larnaca ===
Laifis was loaned to Alki Larnaca early in the 2013–14 season. He made 15 appearances, scoring once, in First Division matches, before returning to Anorthosis in late January 2014.

=== Return to Anorthosis ===
Laifis made 10 First Division appearances in what remained of the 2013–14 season, and continued as a first-team regular, with 24 league appearances in the following season and 29 in 2015–16.

=== Olympiacos and Standard Liège ===
In June 2016, Laifis signed for Super League Greece club Olympiacos. He said "When Olympiacos makes a move, there is nothing else in a player's mind. It was the best thing for my career. I didn't even have to think twice. I am joining Greece's greatest club." A week later, they loaned him to Belgian First Division A club Standard Liège for two years with an option to purchase. After half season in Standard Liège, the Cypriot defender is one of the most remarkable players till now. In Italy, Sky Sports reports that Laifis is in the viewfinder of three clubs: Fiorentina, Torino and Bologna. Three clubs added to the list that already contained Freiburg and other German clubs. His agent had just declared that the defender felt very good at Belgium and that he could not say more about a possible return to the Olympiacos. "I have not organized his loan to Standard, but the relations between the two clubs are excellent and the Olympiakos is watching him closely." On 1 July 2018, after two successful seasons in Belgian First Division A, Olympiakos sold the international Cypriot defender to Standard Liège on a fee estimated to €1.5 million. Laifis signed a three-year contract with the Belgian club.

=== APOEL ===
On 13 August 2024, Laifis signed a three-year contract with APOEL.

On 15 June 2026, APOEL announced the contract extension of club captain Konstantinos Laifis until May 2029. The Cypriot international defender, who also captains the Cyprus national team, remains a key figure in the club's long-term plans. APOEL highlighted Laifis' professionalism, leadership, dedication, and significant contribution to the team, describing him as a role model for Cypriot footballers. The extension reflects the mutual commitment between player and club to pursue domestic success and future European achievements.

== International career ==
Laifis represented Cyprus internationally at all under-age levels. He helped the under-19 team reach the elite qualification round of the 2012 European championships, and made his first appearance for the under-21s in March 2013, when he played the first half of a 2–0 defeat to Belgium in a qualifier for the 2015 European under-21 championships. He played the whole of their next qualifier, a 3–0 win at home to Northern Ireland, and retained his place for a friendly in Romania.

He made his senior debut on 16 November 2014 in a UEFA Euro 2016 qualifier against Andorra. Cyprus won 5–0.

=== International goals ===
Scores and results list Cyprus' goal tally first.

| No | Date | Venue | Opponent | Score | Result | Competition |
|---|---|---|---|---|---|---|
| 1. | 13 November 2016 | GSP Stadium, Nicosia, Cyprus | Gibraltar | 1–0 | 3–1 | 2018 FIFA World Cup qualification |
| 2. | 13 November 2017 | Vazgen Sargsyan Republican Stadium, Yerevan, Armenia | Armenia | 1–2 | 2–3 | Friendly |
| 3. | 21 March 2019 | GSP Stadium, Nicosia, Cyprus | San Marino | 5–0 | 5–0 | UEFA Euro 2020 qualification |
| 4. | 6 June 2025 | Stadion Hristo Botev, Plovdiv, Bulgaria | Bulgaria | 1–1 | 2–2 | Friendly |
| 5. | 9 October 2025 | AEK Arena, Larnaca, Cyprus | Bosnia and Herzegovina | 1–2 | 2–2 | 2026 FIFA World Cup qualification |

== Club statistics ==
As of match played 22 May 2026

Appearances and goals by club, season and competition
| Club | Season | League | | | Cup | | Other(Uefa) | | Total | |
| Club | Season | Division | Apps | Goals | Apps | Goals | Apps | Goals | Apps | Goals |
|---|---|---|---|---|---|---|---|---|---|---|
| Anorthosis | 2011–12 | Cypriot First Division | 0 | 0 | 1 | 0 | — | | 1 | 0 |
| Anorthosis | 2012–13 | Cypriot First Division | 0 | 0 | 0 | 0 | 0 | 0 | 0 | 0 |
| Anorthosis | 2013–14 | Cypriot First Division | 10 | 0 | — | | 1 (Note: Appearance in UEFA Europa League) | 0 | 11 | 0 |
| Anorthosis | 2014–15 | Cypriot First Division | 24 | 4 | 3 | 0 | — | | 27 | 4 |
| Anorthosis | 2015–16 | Cypriot First Division | 29 | 4 | 4 | 0 | — | | 33 | 4 |
| Anorthosis | Total | | 63 | 8 | 8 | 0 | 1 | 0 | 72 | 8 |
| Alki Larnaca (loan) | 2013–14 | Cypriot First Division | 15 | 1 | 2 | 0 | — | | 17 | 1 |
| Alki Larnaca (loan) | Total | | 15 | 1 | 2 | 0 | 0 | 0 | 17 | 1 |
| Olympiacos | 2016–17 | Super League Greece | — | | — | | — | | — | |
| Standard Liège (loan) | 2016–17 | Belgian Pro League | 30 | 1 | 0 | 0 | 6 | 1 | 36 | 2 |
| Standard Liège (loan) | 2017–18 | Belgian Pro League | 38 | 1 | 5 | 0 | 0 | 0 | 43 | 1 |
| Standard Liège | 2018–19 | Belgian Pro League | 39 | 1 | 2 (Note: Appearance in Belgian Super Cup) | 0 | 7 | 1 | 48 | 2 |
| Standard Liège | 2019–20 | Belgian Pro League | 28 | 3 | 1 | 0 | 6 | 0 | 35 | 3 |
| Standard Liège | 2020–21 | Belgian Pro League | 31 | 1 | 5 | 1 | 7 | 1 | 43 | 3 |
| Standard Liège | 2021–22 | Belgian Pro League | 17 | 2 | 1 | 0 | 0 | 0 | 18 | 2 |
| Standard Liège | 2022–23 | Belgian Pro League | 31 | 1 | 2 | 0 | 0 | 0 | 33 | 1 |
| Standard Liège | 2023–24 | Belgian Pro League | 0 | 0 | 0 | 0 | 0 | 0 | 0 | 0 |
| Standard Liège | Total | | 214 | 10 | 16 | 1 | 26 | 3 | 256 | 14 |
| APOEL | 2024–25 | Cypriot First Division | 32 | 3 | 3 (Note: 1 Appearance in Cyprus Super Cup) | 0 | 7 | 3 | 42 | 6 |
| APOEL | 2025–26 | Cypriot First Division | 30 | 4 | 4 | 0 | 0 | 0 | 34 | 4 |
| APOEL | 2026–27 | Cypriot First Division | 0 | 0 | 0 | 0 | 0 | 0 | 0 | 0 |
| APOEL | 2027–28 | Cypriot First Division | 0 | 0 | 0 | 0 | 0 | 0 | 0 | 0 |
| APOEL | 2028–29 | Cypriot First Division | 0 | 0 | 0 | 0 | 0 | 0 | 0 | 0 |
| APOEL | Total | | 62 | 7 | 7 | 0 | 7 | 7 | 76 | 10 |
| Career total | | | 354 | 26 | 33 | 1 | 34 | 10 | 421 | 33 |
