= Irakli Maisuradze =

Georgian footballer (born 1988)

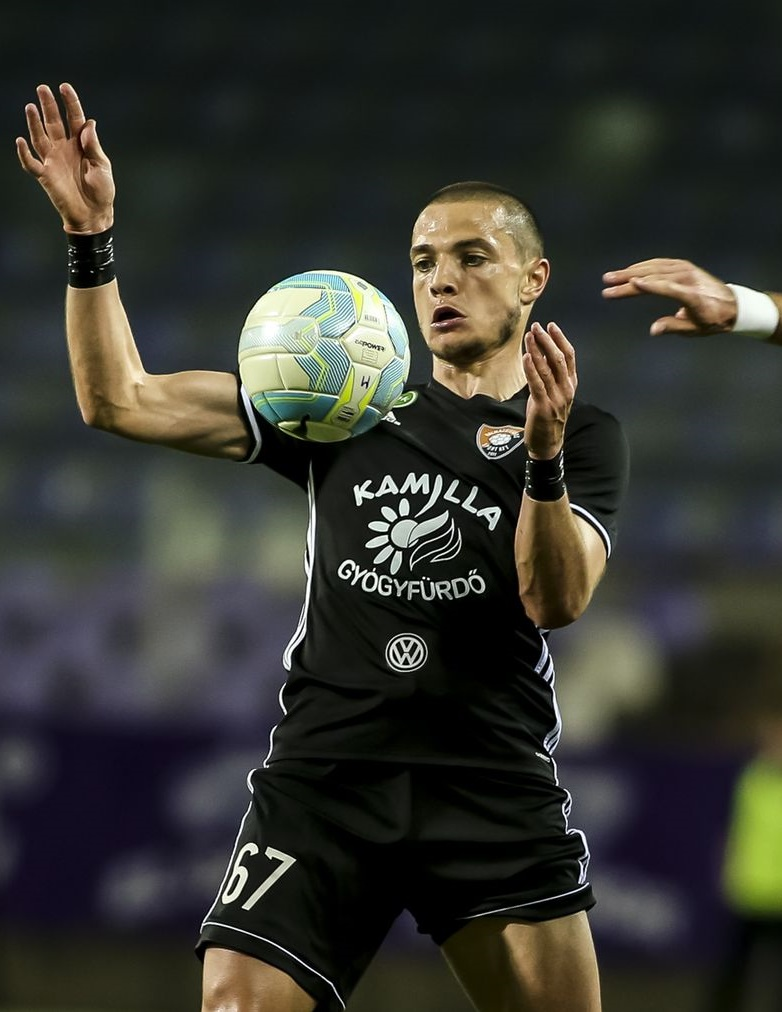
- Maisuradze playing for Balmazújváros in 2018

Personal information
- Date of birth: 22 August 1988 (age 38)
- Place of birth: Tbilisi, Georgian SSR
- Height: 1.77 m (5 ft 9 1/2 in)
- Position: Midfielder

Team information
- Current team: Gagra (coach)

Senior career*
Years	Team	Apps	(Gls)
2007–2008	Zestaponi	0	(0)
2008	MTZ-RIPO Minsk	0	(0)
2009	Vitebsk	8	(0)
2010–2012	Metalurgi Rustavi	70	(5)
2013	Dila Gori	26	(0)
2014	Valletta	11	(0)
2014–2016	Anorthosis Famagusta	56	(0)
2016–2017	Ermis Aradippou	23	(0)
2017–2018	Balmazújváros	26	(0)
2018–2021	Enosis Neon Paralimni	69	(1)
2021–2022	Asteras Vlachioti	21	(0)
2022–2023	AEZ Zakakiou	24	(0)
2023–	Spartakos Kitiou	25	(6)

International career
2011–2013	Georgia	3	(0)

Managerial career
- 2026–: Gagra-2
- * Club domestic league appearances and goals as of 31 May 2024

Irakli Maisuradze (Georgian: ირაკლი მაისურაძე; born 22 August 1988) is a retired Georgian professional footballer who played as a midfielder. He is currently the acting head coach of Erovnuli Liga club Gagra.

Maisuradze played in six countries making more than 350 professional appearances in total.

== Player ==
On 22 July 2017, the Georgian central midfielder is expected to be released from Panionios, only a few weeks after the announcement of deal with the club. The 29-year-old international is not in the season plans of Panionios manager Michalis Grigoriou and its seems that he will have to leave his current team and continue his career elsewhere.

== Manager ==
In September 2026, Maisuradze was unveiled as head coach at Liga 4 side Gagra-2. Shortly, following the departure of Željko Ljubenović, he was appointed as caretaker coach at the main team.
