= Michel Acosta =

Uruguayan footballer (born 1988)

Personal information
- Full name: David Michel Acosta Márquez
- Date of birth: 14 February 1988 (age 38)
- Place of birth: Paysandú, Uruguay
- Height: 1.87 m (6 ft 2 in)
- Position: Defensive midfielder

Team information
- Current team: Tacuarembó
- Number: 14

Youth career
- –2005: Paysandú

Senior career*
| Years | Team | Apps | (Gls) |
| 2005–2006 | Paysandú | 5 | (0) |
| 2006–2011 | Liverpool | 41 | (3) |
| 2012–2013 | Atenas | 23 | (2) |
| 2013–2014 | AEK Kouklia | 27 | (3) |
| 2014–2015 | Atenas | 24 | (5) |
| 2015–2017 | Murciélagos | 51 | (4) |
| 2017 | Liverpool Montevideo | 12 | (1) |
| 2018 | Atlético Venezuela | 28 | (2) |
| 2019 | Guabirá | 30 | (2) |
| 2020 | Atenas | 17 | (1) |
| 2021–2022 | Atlético Bucaramanga | 69 | (5) |
| 2023 | Academia Cantolao | 20 | (0) |
| 2024– | Tacuarembó | 13 | (0) |

International career
| 2005 | Uruguay U17 | | |
- * Club domestic league appearances and goals as of 8 September 2024

David Michel Acosta Márquez (born 14 February 1988) is a Uruguayan footballer who plays as a defensive midfielder for Tacuarembó.

== Career ==
Acosta started his professional career playing with his local city team Paysandú in 2005.

On 23 July 2013, he signed a contract with Cypriot side AEK Kouklia.

== International career ==
Acosta played for the Uruguay U17 team at the 2005 South American Under-17 Football Championship held in Venezuela. Uruguay went on to qualify for the 2005 FIFA U-17 World Championship held in Peru and Acosta was selected for the squad to play in the tournament. Uruguay finished at the bottom of their group with 0 points.
