= Emiliano Fusco =

Argentine footballer

Personal information
- Full name: Emiliano Adrián Fusco
- Date of birth: 2 March 1986 (age 40)
- Place of birth: Caseros, Buenos Aires, Argentina
- Height: 1.74 m (5 ft 9 in)
- Positions: Left back; defensive midfielder

Team information
- Current team: Ferrocarril Midland

Youth career
- Boca Juniors

Senior career*
Years	Team	Apps	(Gls)
2005–2006	Boca Juniors	1	(0)
2006–2007	Manchego		
2007–2008	Mallorca B		
2008–2009	Manchego		
2009–2010	ASIL	22	(1)
2010–2013	Alki Larnaca	79	(1)
2013–2014	Bnei Yehuda Tel Aviv	25	(0)
2014–2016	Ayia Napa	38	(0)
2016–2017	Nea Salamina	22	(0)
2018–	Ferrocarril Midland		
- * Club domestic league appearances and goals as of 16:53, 22 June 2017 (UTC)

Emiliano Adrián Fusco (born 2 March 1986) is an Argentine football midfielder, who currently plays for Ferrocarril Midland.
