= Gaossou Fofana =

Ivorian professional footballer

Gaoussou Fofana
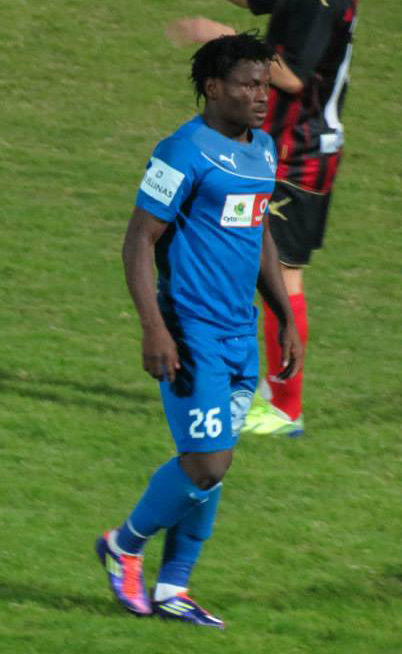
- Fofana on 15 December 2013

Personal information
- Full name: Gaoussou Fofana
- Date of birth: 17 April 1984 (age 42)
- Place of birth: Seguela, Ivory Coast
- Height: 1.70 m (5 ft 7 in)
- Position: Winger

Team information
- Current team: APEP
- Number: 26

Senior career*
Years	Team	Apps	(Gls)
2007	Sabé Sports		
2007–2008	Académica de Coimbra	8	(1)
2008–2010	→ C.D Santa Clara (loan)	22	(1)
2010–2012	Sporting Covilhã	56	(4)
2012–2014	Doxa Katokopias	30	(11)
2013–2014	→ Anorthosis Famagusta (loan)	29	(4)
2014–2015	Omonia	28	(4)
2015–2017	Doxa Katokopias	67	(9)
2017	Ermis Aradippou	1	(0)
2017–2019	Othellos	45	(0)
2019–2020	Digenis	5	(1)
2020–2021	Elia Lythrodonta	29	(5)
2021–	APEP	1	(1)
- * Club domestic league appearances and goals as of 21:02, 16 April 2021 (UTC)

Gaoussou Fofana (born 17 April 1984, in Feseguela, Abidjan, Ivory Coast) is an Ivorian professional footballer who plays for APEP as a winger.

== Early life ==
Fofana was born in Feseguela, a small part of Abidjan. He is best friends with Christodoulos Liotatis from Paralimni.

== Club career ==
Fofana began his professional football career at the age of 22 when he signed for Santa Clara. In the 2007–08 season, Fofana was transferred to Académica de Coimbra and he played 8 matches with 1 goal. The next season, Fofana moved back to Santa Clara from the Portuguese Liga side Académica de Coimbra on loan. At the end of the season, Fofana scored 1 goal in 22 matches and was transferred to Sporting Covilhã and he stayed there for two seasons, scoring 4 goals in 56 matches. In July 2012, he signed a contract with Doxa. and he made a step above with the transfer to Anorthosis Famagusta in July 2013.

== Anorthosis Famagusta ==
On 3 July 2013, Anorthosis signed a year loan contract with Fofana, with wages more than double the wages he was getting on Doxa. Anorthosis fans liked Fofana for his passion on every moment he is spending to the pitch.

== Personal life ==
On 8 July 2014, his 7-year-old son died of malaria in the Makarios hospital in Nicosia.
