= Timotheos Christofi =

Cypriot football referee

- Born: 1987 (age 38–39); Cyprus

Domestic
Years	League	Role

International
Years	League	Role
2018-2021	FIFA listed	Referee

Timotheos Christofi (Greek: Τιμόθεος Χριστοφή; born 11 December 1987) is a Cypriot football referee who is a listed international referee since 2018. He officiates for Europa League Games and for Cyprus First Division. On 31 October 2018 he officiated the biggest derby in Cypriot football, APOEL vs Omonia Nicosia, for the first time.
