= Gonzalo García (footballer, born 1983) =

Uruguayan manager

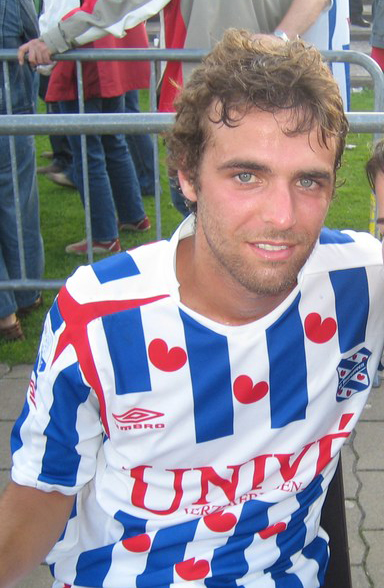
- Gonzalo with Heerenveen in 2007

Personal information
- Full name: Gonzalo Manuel García García
- Date of birth: 13 October 1983 (age 43)
- Place of birth: Montevideo, Uruguay
- Height: 1.82 m (6 ft 0 in)
- Position: Attacking midfielder

Team information
- Current team: Hajduk Split (manager)

Youth career
- 1989–1994: La Rinconada
- 1994–1998: Defensor
- 1998–2001: Compostela
- 2001–2002: Real Madrid

Senior career*
Years	Team	Apps	(Gls)
2001–2003	Real Madrid C		
2003	Alcorcón	1	(0)
2004	Mérida	5	(0)
2004–2005	Palencia	19	(1)
2005–2006	AGOVV	35	(16)
2006–2008	Heerenveen	14	(1)
2008	→ Heracles (loan)	16	(3)
2008–2011	Groningen	49	(7)
2010	→ VVV (loan)	14	(3)
2011–2012	AEK Larnaca	23	(12)
2012–2014	Maccabi Tel Aviv	27	(4)
2013–2014	→ Anorthosis (loan)	19	(9)
2014–2016	Anorthosis	15	(1)
2015–2016	→ Heracles (loan)	8	(0)
2016–2017	Compostela	22	(7)
Total		267	(64)

International career
2001	Spain U17	3	(1)
2002	Spain U19	1	(0)

Managerial career
- 2017–2018: Esbjerg (assistant)
- 2018–2019: Twente (assistant)
- 2019–2020: Twente
- 2021–2023: Istra 1961
- 2024: Arouca
- 2025: Istra 1961
- 2025–: Hajduk Split
- * Club domestic league appearances and goals

Gonzalo Manuel García García (born 13 October 1983), sometimes known simply as Gonzalo García or Gonzalo, is a professional football manager of Croatian club Hajduk Split and former player.

Born in Uruguay, Gonzalo moved to Spain at the age of 13 and joined Real Madrid as a teenager, but never made it past the third team or played any higher than Segunda División B in Spain, spending most of his career in the Dutch Eredivisie as well as in Cyprus and Israel.

As a manager, García led teams in the top divisions of football in the Netherlands, Croatia and Portugal.

== Early life ==
Born in Montevideo, Uruguay, Gonzalo moved to Spain at the age of 13, to his grandparents' native Galicia. He was nicknamed after Uruguay and Inter Milan player Álvaro Recoba, who played in the same position.

He would eventually represent the Spain national under-17 team, at the same time as Andrés Iniesta, José Antonio Reyes and Fernando Torres. His performances attracted suitors such as A.C. Milan – who sent Franco Baresi to his home in the village of Os Tilos, Teo – but his cash-strapped club SD Compostela had already accepted an offer of 50 million pesetas (€300,000) from Real Madrid, a record for the capital team's youth teams.

== Playing career ==
Gonzalo could never move past Real Madrid's third team as a senior. In his country of adoption he never played in higher than the third division, also representing AD Alcorcón, Mérida UD and CF Palencia.

In 2005, Gonzalo moved to the Netherlands, first with AGOVV Apeldoorn, being one of the leading top scorers in the second level season under manager Stanley Menzo. He immediately switched to the Eredivisie after signing with SC Heerenveen, playing his first match in the competition on 10 February 2007 against Vitesse Arnhem but appearing rarely over the course of two seasons, finishing 2007–08 on loan to Heracles Almelo and helping the club narrowly avoid relegation.

Subsequently, Gonzalo signed with FC Groningen, penning a four-year deal with the Euroborg club. First-choice in his debut campaign – 28 matches, four goals – he was rarely played in 2009–10, being again loaned in the January transfer window, now to VVV-Venlo.

In June 2011, Gonzalo moved to Cyprus with AEK Larnaca FC. On the 14th, in the second qualifying round of the UEFA Europa League, he scored a hat-trick in an 8–0 away routing of Floriana FC.

In June 2012, Gonzalo signed with Israel's Maccabi Tel Aviv FC. He settled rarely in the following years, but did spend two seasons with Cypriot First Division club Anorthosis Famagusta FC, the first on loan.

Gonzalo returned to Dutch football on 4 August 2015, after agreeing to a contract at Heracles. He retired at the age of 34, following a spell with former youth club Compostela.

== Coaching career ==
García started working as a manager immediately after retiring, acting as assistant at Esbjerg fB of the Danish 1st Division. On 16 May 2019, after one year in the same capacity at FC Twente, he was appointed their head coach, as Marino Pušić had been dismissed despite winning the Eerste Divisie title.

On 3 August 2019, García's debut for Twente was a 1–1 home draw with PSV Eindhoven. His contract was not renewed after it expired following the 2019–20 season, in which the club finished 14th and the campaign was abandoned due to the COVID-19 pandemic.

García was appointed head coach of Croatian HNL side NK Istra 1961 on 16 June 2021. After achieving 9th place in his first season, he finished 5th in 2022–23, missing out on Europe by one place; his team won against GNK Dinamo Zagreb, HNK Hajduk Split and local rivals HNK Rijeka. He then allowed his contract to expire, and was replaced by Mislav Karoglan.

In May 2024, García was hired as the head coach of Portuguese club F.C. Arouca, with a contract for one season and an option to extend for another. He left by mutual agreement on 28 October with the team in 14th having won twice and drawn once in nine Primeira Liga games, as well as winning their match in the Taça de Portugal.

García returned to Istra 1961 in January 2025, succeeding Paolo Tramezzani.

== Managerial statistics ==
As of match played 27 May 2023

Managerial record by team and tenure
Team	Nat	From	To	Record							
Team	Nat	From	To	G	W	D	L	GF	GA	GD	Win %
Twente	(Netherlands)	1 July 2019	30 June 2020	28	8	6	14	38	51	−13	28.57
Istra 1961	(Croatia)	1 July 2021	June 2023	76	21	22	33	89	112	−23	27.63
Total				104	29	28	47	127	163	−36	27.88

== Honours ==
=== Player ===
Maccabi Tel Aviv

- Israeli Premier League: 2012–13
