= 2011–12 AC Omonia season =

AC Omonia
2011–12 season
- Chairman: Miltiades Neophytou
- Manager: Neophytos Larkou
- Stadium: GSP Stadium, Nicosia
- Cypriot First Division: 3rd
- LTV Super Cup: Runners-up
- Cypriot Cup: Winners
- Europa League: Play-off round
- Top goalscorer: League: Freddy (17); All: Freddy (18)
- Highest home attendance: 16,419 vs APOEL (11 December 2011)
- Lowest home attendance: 0 vs APOEL (March 31, 2012)
- Average home league attendance: 8,921
Home colours	Away colours	Third colours

The 2011–12 season is Omonia's 57th season in the Cypriot First Division and 63rd year in existence as a football club. On 22 June, the first training session for the season took place at GSP Stadium. The pre-season tour this season was in Poland. The team entered the 2011–12 UEFA Europa League third qualifying round on 28 July and won the first leg in Cyprus against ADO Den Haag. One week later, they eliminated the Dutch team and were drawn against Red Bull Salzburg in the play-off round. A comeback and a 2–1 win and the team still had the chance to advance to the group stages. Omonia lost 0–1 in Austria and were eliminated on the away goals rule. Omonia won the Cypriot Cup last season and therefore played in the Cypriot Super Cup on 7 August against the rivals APOEL but the team lost 0–1.

== Current squad ==
Last Update: January 28, 2012

Note: Flags indicate national team as defined under FIFA eligibility rules; some limited exceptions apply. Players may hold more than one non-FIFA nationality.

No.	Pos.	Nation	Player
1	GK	(Montenegro) MNE	Dragoslav Jevrić
2	DF	(Nigeria) NGA	Rasheed Alabi
5	DF	(Greece) GRE	Christos Karipidis (1st Vice-Captain)
6	MF	(Switzerland) SUI	Vero Salatić
7	MF	(Cyprus) CYP	Georgios Efrem
8	MF	(France) FRA	Bryan Bergougnoux (on loan from Lecce)
10	MF	(Portugal) POR	Bruno Aguiar
11	MF	(Cyprus) CYP	Andreas Avraam
13	MF	(Cyprus) CYP	Constantinos Makrides (Captain)
15	GK	(Cyprus) CYP	Giorgos Loizou
16	MF	(Zimbabwe) ZIM	Noel Kaseke
17	FW	(Cyprus) CYP	Theodosis Kyprou
18	DF	(Cyprus) CYP	Christoforos Charalambous
19	DF	(Israel) ISR	David Ben Dayan

No.	Pos.	Nation	Player
20	DF	(Algeria) ALG	Sofiane Cherfa
24	DF	(Israel) ISR	Yuval Spungin
25	FW	(Brazil) BRA	Andre Alves
26	FW	(Cyprus) CYP	Ioannis Chadjivasilis
28	DF	(Portugal) POR	Margaça
29	DF	(Spain) ESP	Iago Bouzón
30	GK	(Cyprus) CYP	Antonis Georgallides
32	GK	(Greece) GRE	Makis Giannikoglou
40	MF	(Cyprus) CYP	Charalambos Kyriakou
44	MF	(Brazil) BRA	Leandro (2nd Vice-Captain)
46	MF	(Cyprus) CYP	Stathis Aloneftis
77	FW	(Cyprus) CYP	Demetris Christofi
99	FW	(Angola) ANG	Freddy

For recent transfers, see List of Cypriot football transfers summer 2011.
Also, see List of Cypriot football transfers winter 2011–12.

=== Squad changes ===
In:

No.	Pos.	Nat.	Name	Age	EU	Moving from	Type	Transfer window	Ends	Transfer fee	Source
9	MF	(Brazil)	Alexandre	27	EU	Enosis Neon Paralimni	Transfer	Summer	2013	€150,000	omonoianews.com
21	GK	(Uruguay)	Frascarelli	26	Non-EU	APOP Kinyras	Transfer	Summer	2013	Free	kifines.com
55	FW	(Croatia)	Tadić	23	EU	Arminia Bielefeld	Transfer	Summer	2013	Free	omonoianews.com
28	LB	(Portugal)	Margaça	25	EU	AEK Larnaca	Transfer	Summer	2013	€170,000	omonoianews.com
6	DM	(Switzerland)	Salatić	25	EU	Grasshopper Club Zürich	Transfer	Summer	2013	Free	supermpala.com
20	CB	(Algeria)	Cherfa	26	EU	Châteauroux	Transfer	Summer	2013	Free	kerkida.net
99	FW	(Angola)	Freddy	32	Non-EU	AEL Limassol	Transfer	Summer	2013	€50,000	omonoia.com.cy
19	LB	(Israel)	Ben Dayan	33	EU	Hapoel Tel Aviv	Transfer	Winter	2013	Free	kifines.com

Out:

No.	Pos.	Nat.	Name	Age	EU	Moving to	Type	Transfer window	Transfer fee	Source
1	GK	(Cyprus)	Asprogenous	31	EU	AEP Paphos	Transfer	Summer	Free	sportnetcy.com
33	LB	(Cyprus)	Charalambous	30	EU	Alki Larnaca	Released	Summer	N/A	omonoianews.com
32	FW	(Democratic Republic of the Congo)	LuaLua	30	EU	Blackpool (England)	Released	Summer	N/A	omonoia.com.cy
N/A	MF	(Cyprus)	Katsis	21	EU	Alki Larnaca	Loan	Summer	Free	sportnetcy.com
N/A	DF	(Spain)	Espasandín	26	EU		Released	Summer	N/A	supermpala.com
6	MF	(Cyprus)	Panagi	24	EU	Alki Larnaca	Transfer	Summer	Free	sport-fm.com.cy
4	CB	(Germany)	Wenzel	33	EU	Kerkyra	End of contract	Summer	Free	omonoia.com.cy
9	MF	(Brazil)	Alexandre	27	EU	AEK Larnaca	Transfer	Winter	N/A	

Last updated: 2011-07-30

== Club ==
=== Captains ===
1. (Cyprus) Constantinos Makrides
2. (Greece) Christos Karipidis
3. (Brazil) Leandro Marcolini Pedroso de Almeida

== Competitions ==
=== Pre-season ===
04-07-2011 Friendly	Polonia Środa	1 – 2	Omonia
18:00 CET	Przybyłek 66'		Rengifo 6'; Christofi 72'

05-07-2011 Friendly	Arka Gdynia	0 – 1	Omonia
18:00 CET			Aguiar 39'

08-07-2011 Friendly	Lechia Gdańsk	2 – 2	Omonia
18:30 CET	53'; 56'		Salatić 19'; Christofi 28'

11-07-2011 Friendly	Zagłębie Lubin	2 – 1	Omonia
18:00 CET	Małkowski 33'; Pawłowski 42'		Aguiar 50' (pen.)

14-07-2011 Friendly	Widzew Łódź	3 – 4	Omonia
18:00 CET	Panka 8'; Dudu 47' (pen.); Radzio 82'		Efrem 10' 17'; Tadić 31'; Christofi 34'

22-07-2011 Friendly	Omonia	1 – 2	Calcio Catania	GSP Stadium, Nicosia
19:05 CET	Aguiar 72'		Ledesma 51'; Augustyn 90+1'

12-08-2011 Friendly	Enosis	1 – 0	Omonia	Tasos Markou Stadium, Paralimni
19:30 CET	Moukouri 79'

04-09-2011 Friendly	Ermis	1 – 3	Omonia	Ammochostos Stadium, Larnaca
18:00 UTC+2	González 10'		Leandro 36'; Rengifo 39'; Freddy 52'

=== Laiki Bank League ===
==== Classification ====
Pos	Team	Pld	W	D	L	GF	GA	GD	Pts	Qualification or relegation
1	AEL Limassol	26	18	6	2	33	7	+26	60	Qualification for second round, Group A
2	Omonia Nicosia	26	17	6	3	47	16	+31	57	Qualification for second round, Group A
3	APOEL	26	17	5	4	39	13	+26	56	Qualification for second round, Group A
4	Anorthosis Famagusta	26	15	7	4	30	12	+18	52	Qualification for second round, Group A
5	AEK Larnaca	26	11	9	6	33	21	+12	42	Qualification for second round, Group B

Source: UEFA
Rules for classification: 1) points; 2) head-to-head points; 3) head-to-head goal difference; 4) head-to-head away goals scored; 5) goal difference; 6) number of goals scored

==== Results summary ====
Overall								Home						Away					
Pld	W	D	L	GF	GA	GD	Pts	W	D	L	GF	GA	GD	W	D	L	GF	GA	GD
29	17	6	6	49	22	+27	57	9	2	4	24	12	+12	8	4	2	25	10	+15

Last updated: April 23, 2012.
Source: UEFA

==== Results by round ====
Round	1	2	3	4	5	6	7	8	9	10	11	12	13	14	15	16	17	18	19	20	21	22	23	24	25	26	27	28	29	30	31	32
Ground	H	A	H	A	H	A	H	A	H	A	H	A	H	A	H	A	H	A	H	A	H	A	H	A	H	A	H	A	H	A	A	H
Result	W	D	W	W	W	D	W	W	W	W	D	D	L	W	W	W	L	W	W	L	W	W	D	W	W	D	L	L	L	W	W	W

Updated to match(es) played on April 29, 2012. Source: UEFA
A = Away; H = Home; W = Win; D = Draw; L = Loss

==== Disciplinary records ====
No.	Pos.	Nat.	Player	Yellow card	Yellow-red card	Red card
1	GK	(Montenegro)	Jevrić	0	0	0
30	GK	(Cyprus)	Georgallides	0	0	0
2	DF	(Nigeria)	Alabi	1	0	0
5	DF	(Greece)	Karipidis	3	0	0
11	DF	(Cyprus)	Avraam	2	1	0
16	DF	(Zimbabwe)	Kaseke	4	0	0
19	DF	(Israel)	Ben Dayan	1	0	0
20	DF	(Algeria)	Cherfa	7	1	0
24	DF	(Israel)	Spungin	3	0	0
28	DF	(Portugal)	Margaça	5	0	0
29	DF	(Spain)	Bouzón	2	1	0
6	MF	(Switzerland)	Salatić	4	0	0
7	MF	(Cyprus)	Efrem	6	1	0
8	FW	(France)	Bergougnoux	0	0	0
10	MF	(Portugal)	Aguiar	5	0	0
13	MF	(Cyprus)	Makrides	2	0	0
25	MF	(Brazil)	Alves	0	0	0
44	MF	(Hungary)	Leandro	4	0	0
46	MF	(Cyprus)	Aloneftis	3	0	0
77	FW	(Cyprus)	Christofi	3	0	0
99	FW	(Angola)	Freddy	2	0	0

==== Matches ====
Kick-off times are in UTC+2.

29-08-2011 Matchweek 1	Omonia	4 – 1	Alki Larnaca	GSP Stadium
18:00 UTC+2	Efrem 7'; Efrem 32'; Freddy 39'; Bouzón (yellow card) 61'; Christofi 90'	report	Aspas (yellow card) 10'; Dobrašinović (yellow card) 37'; David Solari 53'; Fusco (yellow card) 82'	Attendance: 6.732; Referee: (Cyprus) Stelios Trifonos

11-09-2011 Matchweek 2	Aris Limassol	1 – 1	Omonia	Tsirion Stadium
19:00 UTC+2	Vasiliou 27'; Ioannou (yellow card) 35'; Kerkez (yellow card) 88'	report	Margaça 85'; Karipidis (yellow card) 87'	Attendance: 5.162; Referee: (Cyprus) Vasilis Dimitriou

02-11-2011 Matchweek 3	Omonia	1 – 0	AEL Limassol	GSP Stadium
16:00 UTC+2	Kaseke (yellow card) 21'; Freddy 71'	report	Airosa (yellow card) 28'; Júnior (yellow card) 36'; Monteiro (yellow card) 90'	Attendance: 0 Referee: (Cyprus) Stelios Trifonos

24-09-2011 Matchweek 4	Anorthosis	0 – 1	Omonia	Antonis Papadopoulos Stadium
18:00 UTC+2	Roncatto (yellow card) 65'; Rezek (yellow card) 74'; Angelov (yellow card) 77'	report	Freddy 45' (yellow card) 45'; Margaça (yellow card) 47'; Bouzón (yellow card) 71'; Aguiar (yellow card) 89'	Attendance: 10.500; Referee: (Cyprus) Marios Nikolaidis

01-10-2011 Matchweek 5	Omonia	2 – 0	Ermis Aradippou	GSP Stadium
18:00 UTC+2	Aguiar 48'; Freddy 55'	report	Dante Formica (yellow card) 32'; Charara (yellow card) 37'; Angelis Charalambous (yellow card) 61'; Héctor González (yellow card) 71'	Attendance: 5.103; Referee: (Cyprus) Thomas Mouskos

15-10-2011 Matchweek 6	Anagennisi Dherynia	1 – 1	Omonia	Tasos Markou Stadium
18:00 UTC+2	Spungin 20'o.g. Robert Alviž (yellow card) 24'; Giorgos Giannakou (yellow card) 43'; Georgios Tofas (yellow card) 65'; Athanasios Pindonis (yellow card) 79'; Guzmán (yellow card) 85'	report	Alex da Silva 45'; Efrem (yellow card) 50' (red card); Aloneftis (yellow card) 90'; Cherfa (yellow card) 90'	Attendance: 5.800; Referee: (Cyprus) Christos Elia

22-10-2011 Matchweek 7	Omonia	2 – 0	AEK Larnaca	GSP Stadium
18:00 UTC+2	Freddy 20'; Aguiar (yellow card) 22'; Christofi (yellow card) 44'; Kaseke 75'; Spungin (yellow card) 79'	report	G.García (yellow card) 6'; J.Demetriou (yellow card) 42'; Priso (yellow card) 46'; Dimech (yellow card) 56'	Attendance: 6.500; Referee: (Cyprus) Leontios Trattou

29-10-2011 Matchweek 8	Olympiakos Nicosia	0 – 2	Omonia	GSP Stadium
18:00 UTC+2	Paulinho (yellow card) 14'; Mércio (yellow card) 39'	report	Aguiar 14' pen. Kaseke (yellow card) 36'; Margaça (yellow card) 43'; Salatić (yellow card) 51'; Avraam (yellow card) 72'; Cherfa 77' (yellow card) 78'	Attendance: 2.696; Referee: (Cyprus) Vasilis Demetriou

05-11-2011 Matchweek 9	Omonia	2 – 0	Apollon Limassol	GSP Stadium
18:00 UTC+2	Freddy 69'; Freddy 72'; Freddy (yellow card) 89'	report	Hamdani (yellow card) 78'	Attendance: 10.800; Referee: (Cyprus) Christos Nikolaides

19-11-2011 Matchweek 10	Ethnikos Achna	0 – 1	Omonia	Dasaki Stadium
18:00 UTC+2	Wender (yellow card) 47'	report	Aguiar (yellow card) 45'; Christofi (yellow card) 59'; Christofi 67'; Karipidis (yellow card) 90'	Attendance: 1.200; Referee: (Cyprus) Kostas Pseudiotis

26-11-2011 Matchweek 11	Omonia	2 – 2	Nea Salamina	GSP Stadium
18:00 UTC+2	Freddy 45'; Freddy 69'; Leandro (yellow card) 77'; Kaseke (yellow card) 90'	report	Gray 20'; Dickson (yellow card) 49'; Roque 80'	Attendance: 10.266; Referee: (Cyprus) Dimitris Masias

03-12-2011 Matchweek 12	Enosis	1 – 1	Omonia	Tasos Markou Stadium
18:00 UTC+2	Semedo (yellow card) 23'; Burchill (yellow card) 29'; Semedo 30'; Alivodić (yellow card) 59'; Moukouri (red card) 87'; Petkov (yellow card) 90'	report	Cherfa (yellow card) 46'; Alex da Silva (yellow card) 59'; Cherfa 62'; Efrem (yellow card) 65'	Attendance: 800; Referee: (Cyprus) Leontios Trattou

11-12-2011 Matchweek 13	Omonia	1 – 3	APOEL	GSP Stadium, Nicosia
14:30	Avraam 9'; Bouzón (yellow card) 31' (yellow-red card)	report	Solomou 42'; Solari 74', 78'	Attendance: 16,419; Referee: (Cyprus) Marios Tsaggaris

17-12-2011 Matchweek 14	Alki Larnaca	0 – 3	Omonia	GSZ Stadium
18:00	David Solari (yellow card) 3'; Cierzniak (yellow card) 31'; Fusco (yellow card) 61'; Santamaria (yellow card) 67'; B.Fernandes (yellow card) 82'	report	Avraam 28'; Leandro 30'; Leandro (yellow card) 57'; Makrides 61'; Cherfa (yellow card) 82'	Attendance: 1.200; Referee: (Cyprus) Marios Panagi

08-01-2012 Matchweek 15	Omonia	3 – 0	Aris Limassol	GSP Stadium
18:00	Alex da Silva 5' pen. Efrem (yellow card) 10'; Efrem 55'; Freddy 73'	report	Charalampous (yellow card) 43'; Markou (yellow card) 53'; A.Theofanous (yellow card) 71'	Attendance: 5.834; Referee: (Cyprus) Vasilis Dimitriou

14-01-2012 Matchweek 16	AEL Limassol	0 – 3	Omonia	Tsirion Stadium
14:30	Bebê (yellow card) 31'; Ouon (yellow card) 77'	report	Freddy (yellow card) 18'; Avraam (yellow card) 31'; Makrides (yellow card) 41'; Makrides 47'; Efrem 79'; Salatić (yellow card) 83'; Efrem 85'	Attendance: 12.000; Referee: (Cyprus) Marios Panagi

21-01-2012 Matchweek 17	Omonia	0 – 1	Anorthosis	GSP Stadium
14:30	Spungin (yellow card) 29'; Cherfa (yellow card) 61'; Alex da Silva (yellow card) 89'		Andić (red card) 45'; Angelov (yellow card) 45'; Marquinhos (yellow card) 45'; Laborde (yellow card) 62'; Roncatto 84'	Attendance: 12.358; Referee: (Cyprus) Stelios Trifonos

28-01-2012 Matchweek 18	Ermis Aradippou	0 – 2	Omonia	Ammochostos Stadium
18:00	Demetriou (yellow card) 62'	report	Margaça (yellow card) 61'; Efrem 63'; Freddy 83' (pen.); Aloneftis (yellow card) 87'	Attendance: 2.500; Referee: (Cyprus) Antonis Christodoulou

05-02-2012 Matchweek 19	Omonia	2 – 0	Anagennisi Dherynia	GSP Stadium
18:00	Freddy 63' (pen.); Efrem (yellow card) 76'; Freddy 89' (pen.)	report	Bangura (yellow card) 25'; Gogolos (yellow card) 63'; Spyrou (red card) 88'	Attendance: 5.835; Referee: (Cyprus) Savvas Zafiris

11-02-2012 Matchweek 20	AEK Larnaca	2 – 1	Omonia	GSZ Stadium
18:00	Mrdaković 45'; Mrdaković (yellow card) 45'; Mrdaković 58'; Linssen (yellow card) 62'; Serrán (yellow card) 64'; Alex da Silva (yellow card) 70' de Cler (yellow card) 77'	report	Cherfa (yellow card) 55' (red card); Salatić 90'	Attendance: 6.500; Referee: (Cyprus) Vasilis Dimitriou

18-02-2012 Matchweek 21	Omonia	1 – 0	Olympiakos Nicosia	GSP Stadium
18:00	Efrem (yellow card) 53'; Freddy 57'; Salatić (yellow card) 85'	report	Rodriguez (yellow card) 10'; Aurélio (yellow card) 45'; Paulinho (yellow card) 61'; Mércio (yellow card) 65'; Kučuković (yellow card) 90'	Attendance: 3.822; Referee: (Cyprus) Dimitris Chrisostomou

25-02-2012 Matchweek 22	Apollon Limassol	2 – 5	Omonia	Tsirion Stadium
15:00	Merkis 31'; Bangura 54' (pen.)	report	Christofi 19'; Aguiar (yellow card) 25'; Spungin (yellow card) 31'; Freddy 41'; Aguiar 55'; Avraam 85'; Salatić (yellow card) 85'; Alves 90'	Attendance: 6.850; Referee: (Cyprus) Charalambos Skapoullis

04-03-2012 Matchweek 23	AC Omonia	1 – 1	Ethnikos Achna	GSP Stadium
18:00	Ben Dayan (yellow card) 63'; Aloneftis (yellow card) 88'; Makrides (yellow card) 90'; Karipidis 98'	report	Vattis 30'; Pincelli (yellow card) 36'; Elia (yellow card) 70'; Nuredinoski (yellow card) 78'; Simov (yellow card) 89'	Attendance: 6.172; Referee: (Cyprus) Marios Panayi

10-03-2012 Matchweek 24	Nea Salamina	1 – 4	Omonia	Ammochostos Stadium
18:00	Gray (yellow card) 6'; Oper 53'; García (yellow card) 88'	report	Freddy 21'; Cherfa (yellow card) 23'; Makrides 35'; Makrides 39'; Margaça (yellow card) 74'; Leandro (yellow card) 76'; Freddy 88'(pen.)	Attendance: 3.500; Referee: (Cyprus) Leontios Ttrattou

17-03-2012 Matchweek 25	Omonia	1 – 0	Enosis	GSP Stadium
18:00	Bouzón (yellow card) 43'; Alves 77'; Bergougnoux (yellow card) 88'	report	Sade (yellow card) 10'; Zulu (yellow card) 82'; Trenson (yellow card) 90'	Attendance: 0 Referee: (Cyprus) Vasilis Dimitriou

23-03-2012 Matchweek 26	APOEL	0 – 0	Omonia	GSP Stadium
16:00	Boaventura (yellow card) 24'; Poursaitidis (yellow card) 43'; Jorge (yellow card) 71'; Manduca (yellow card) 75'	report	Cherfa (yellow card) 40'; Aloneftis (yellow card) 45' (red card); Karipidis (yellow card) 75'; Efrem (yellow card) 82'	Attendance: 18.000; Referee: (Cyprus) Dimitris Masias

==== Second round ====
===== Group A =====
Pos	Team	Pld	W	D	L	GF	GA	GD	Pts	Qualification
1	AEL Limassol (C)	32	20	8	4	37	10	+27	68	Qualification for Champions League second qualifying round
2	APOEL	32	20	6	6	46	19	+27	66 (Note: APOE: 7pts; OMO: 4pts)	Qualification for Europa League second qualifying round
3	Omonia	32	20	6	6	56	23	+33	66	Qualification for Europa League third qualifying round (Note: The 2011–12 Cypriot Cup winners, Omonia, qualified for the third qualifying round of UEFA Europa League. Since they finished third, the fourth-placed team of the league also qualified for the Europa League.)
4	Anorthosis Famagusta	32	17	8	7	36	22	+14	59	Qualification for Europa League second qualifying round

Rules for classification: 1) points; 2) head-to-head points; 3) head-to-head goal difference; 4) head-to-head goals scored; 5) goal difference; 6) number of goals scored.
(C) Champions

===== Matches =====
31-03-2012 Matchweek 1	Omonia	1 – 2	APOEL	GSP Stadium
17:00	Christofi 56'; Salatić (yellow card) 79'; Karipidis (yellow card) 85'	report	Sousa (yellow card) 44'; Sousa 45'; Morais (yellow card) 89'; Manduca 90'	Attendance: 0 Referee: (Cyprus) Thomas Mouskos

08-04-2012 Matchweek 2	AEL Limassol	2 – 0	Omonia	Tsirion Stadium
17:00	Bebê 15'; Monteiro (yellow card) 23'; Vouho 35' (pen.); Airosa (yellow card) 51'; Dédé (yellow card) 79'	report	Salatić (yellow card) 11'; Cherfa (yellow card) 40'; Bouzón (yellow card) 59'; Spungin (yellow card) 86' (yellow-red card)	Attendance: 9.890; Referee: (Cyprus) Vasilis Dimitriou

21-04-2012 Matchweek 3	Omonia	1 – 2	Anorthosis	GSP Stadium
17:00	Aloneftis 84'		Marquinhos 60'; Laborde (yellow card) 77' (yellow-red card); Roncatto 90'	Attendance: 0 Referee: (Cyprus) Leontios Trattos

28-04-2012 Matchweek 4	Anorthosis	0 – 4	Omonia	Antonis Papadopoulos Stadium
17:00	Janício (red card) 16'; Sprockel (yellow card) 83'	report	Ben Dayan (yellow card) 20'; Spungin (yellow card) 22'; Aloneftis (yellow card) 36'; Karipidis (yellow card) 53'; Ben Dayan 43'; Alves 67'; Alves 75'; Bergougnoux 89'	Attendance: 0 Referee: (Cyprus) Dimitris Chrisostomou

05-05-2012 Matchweek 5	APOEL	1 – 2	Omonia	GSP Stadium
17:00	Almeida 40'; Morais (yellow card) 90' (red card)	report	Ben Dayan (yellow card) 20'; Avraam 22'; Cherfa (yellow card) 65'; Christofi 78'; Alabi (yellow card) 79'	Attendance: 14.000; Referee: (Cyprus) Leontios Trattou

12-05-2012 Matchweek 6	Omonia	1 – 0	AEL Limassol	GSP Stadium
16:00	A.Kyriakou 88'(o.g.)	report		Attendance: 0 Referee: (Cyprus) Leontios Trattou

=== UEFA Europa League ===
==== Third qualifying round ====
28-07-2011 First leg	Omonia (Cyprus)	3 – 0	(Netherlands) ADO Den Haag	GSP Stadium, Nicosia
19:30 CET	Alexandre 38' (pen.); Leandro (yellow card) 53'; Rengifo 58'; Aguiar (yellow card) 73'; Christofi 76'; Karipidis (yellow card) 87'	report	Kum (yellow card) 37'; Verhoek (yellow card) 37'; Lukšík (yellow card) 55'	Attendance: 12,326; Referee: (Portugal) Carlos Xistra

04-08-2011 Second leg	ADO Den Haag (Netherlands)	1 – 0	(Cyprus) Omonia	Kyocera Stadion, The Hague
20:00 CET	Verhoek (yellow card) 18'; Chery (yellow card) 42'; Immers (yellow card) 50'; Derijck 53'	report	Alex (yellow card) 8'; Efrem (yellow card) 12'; Alabi (yellow card) 64'; Christofi (yellow card) 88'	Attendance: 13,268; Referee: (Malta) Marco Borg

- Omonia won 3-1 on aggregate.

==== Play-off round ====
18-08-2011 First leg	Omonia (Cyprus)	2 – 1	(Austria) Red Bull Salzburg	GSP Stadium, Nicosia
19:00 CET	Efrem (yellow card) 20'; Freddy 35'; Leandro 45+3'; Cherfa (yellow card) 60'; Margaça (yellow card) 90+1'	report	Alan 3' , (yellow card) 77'; Leitgeb (yellow card) 29'; Hierländer (yellow card) 34'; Hinteregger (yellow card) 45+2'; Leonardo (yellow card) 90+1'	Attendance: 11,858; Referee: (England) Lee Probert

25-08-2011 Second leg	Red Bull Salzburg (Austria)	1 – 0	(Cyprus) Omonia	Red Bull Arena, Salzburg
21:05 CET	Alan (yellow card) 31'; Hinteregger 51'; Pasanen (yellow card) 59' (yellow-red card) 71'	report	Avraam (yellow card) 23' (yellow-red card) 71'; Kaseke (yellow card) 73'	Attendance: 9,100; Referee: (Lithuania) Gediminas Mažeika

- Red Bull Salzburg 2–2 Omonia on aggregate. Red Bull Salzburg won on away goals.

=== LTV Super Cup ===
07-08-2011 Final	APOEL	1 – 0	Omonia	GSP Stadium, Nicosia
20:00 CET	Kontis 81'	report		Attendance: 9,752; Referee: (Cyprus) Demetris Chrysostomou

=== Cypriot Cup ===
==== Second round ====
01-02-2012 First leg	Omonia	2 – 0	Nea Salamis	GSP Stadium
18:00 EET	García (o.g.) 16'; Aguiar 78'			Attendance: 3.353; Referee: (Cyprus) Dimitris Chrysostomou

08-02-2012 Second leg	Nea Salamis	1 – 8	Omonia	Ammochostos Stadium
18:00 EET	Adamou 79'		Avraam 11'; Aloneftis 17'; Salatić 34'; Aloneftis 45'; Aloneftis 65' (pen.); Alves 77'; Bergougnoux 81'; Aguiar 88' (pen.)	Attendance: 700; Referee: (Cyprus) Dimitris Masias

- Omonia won 10-1 on aggregate.

==== Quarter-finals ====
14-03-2012 First leg	Omonia	6 – 0	Ermis Aradippou	GSP Stadium
18:00 EET	Alves 27'; Alves 47'; Fassotte 55'(o.g.); Efrem 60'; Bergougnoux 65'; Avraam 73'			Attendance: 2.559; Referee: (Cyprus) Stelios Trifonos

28-03-2012 Second leg	Ermis Aradippou	0 – 3	Omonia	Ammochostos Stadium
19:00 EEST			Christofi 18'; Charalambous 82'; Cherfa 91'	Attendance: 500; Referee: (Cyprus) Marios Stamatis

- Omonia won 9-0 on aggregate.

==== Semi-finals ====
11-04-2012 First leg	Omonia	3 – 0	Ethnikos Achna	GSP Stadium
18:00 EEST	Margaça 38'; Salatić 57'; Efrem 72'		Simov (red card) 90'	Attendance: 4.347; Referee: (Cyprus) Dimitris Chrisostomou

02-05-2012 Second leg	Ethnikos Achna	1 – 0	Omonia	Dasaki Stadium
17:00 EEST	Wender 31' (pen.)			Attendance: - Referee: (Cyprus) Charalampos Skapoulis

- Omonia won 3-1 on aggregate.

==== Final ====
16-05-2012 Final	AEL Limassol	0 – 1	Omonia	GSP Stadium
19:00 EEST	Ouon (red card) 30'		Alves 16'	Attendance: 18.407; Referee: (Germany) Felix Brych
