= 2012–13 AC Omonia season =

AC Omonia
2012–13 season
- Manager: Toni Savevski
- Stadium: GSP Stadium, Nicosia
- Cypriot First Division: 3rd
- LTV Super Cup: Winners
- Cypriot Cup: Semi-finals
- Europa League: Third qualifying round
- Top goalscorer: League: Alves (13); All: Alves (16)
- Highest home attendance: 14,011 vs APOEL (October 7, 2012 - League)
- Lowest home attendance: 1,500 vs Ethnikos Achna (16 January 2013 - Cypriot Cup)
- Average home league attendance: 7,906
Home colours	Away colours	Third colours

The 2012–13 season is Omonia's 58th season in the Cypriot First Division and 64th year in existence as a football club. The pre-season tour this season took part once again in Poland. During the two weeks in Opalenica, Omonia will be playing four friendly games. Later on, the Greens are playing their debut game at GSP Stadium against Doxa Katokopia. Their last test before the season starts will be against Willem II in GSP Stadium on 27 July. The European journey starts a less than week later when the team enters the 2012–13 UEFA Europa League third qualifying round. The league kick-off's in September when newcome Ayia Napa visits Nicosia for a tough clash. In the beginning of 2013, the team enters Cypriot Cup second round.

== Current squad ==
Last Update: April 2, 2013

=== First team squad ===
Note: Flags indicate national team as defined under FIFA eligibility rules; some limited exceptions apply. Players may hold more than one non-FIFA nationality.

No.	Pos.	Nation	Player
2	DF	NGR	Rasheed Alabi
6	MF	POR	João Alves
7	MF	CYP	Georgios Efrem
8	FW	CYP	Onisiforos Roushias
9	FW	ANG	Freddy
10	MF	POR	Bruno Aguiar
13	FW	CYP	Marios Demetriou
14	DF	BRA	Danielson
17	DF	FRA	Anthony Scaramozzino
18	DF	CYP	Christoforos Charalambous
19	DF	CYP	Andreas Panayiotou
21	MF	POR	Nuno Assis
23	DF	POR	João Paulo Andrade

No.	Pos.	Nation	Player
24	DF	ISR	Yuval Spungin
25	FW	BRA	André Alves
26	GK	ISR	Ohad Levita
28	DF	POR	Renato Margaça
30	MF	MLT	André Schembri
31	GK	POR	José Moreira
32	GK	GRE	Makis Giannikoglou
40	DF	CYP	Charalambos Kyriakou
44	MF	HUN	Leandro (Captain)
60	MF	CPV	Marco Soares
77	FW	CYP	Demetris Christofi (Vice-Captain)
81	MF	CYP	Stavros Christoudias

For recent transfers, see List of Cypriot football transfers winter 2012–13.

=== Squad changes ===
In:

No.	Pos.	Nat.	Name	Age	EU	Moving from	Type	Transfer window	Ends	Transfer fee	Source
	DF	(Cyprus)	Antonis Katsis	37	EU	Alki Larnaca	Loan return	Summer		Free	
1	GK	(Switzerland)	Johnny Leoni	42	EU	Zürich	Transfer	Summer		Free	
17	DF	(France)	Anthony Scaramozzino	41	EU	Châteauroux	Transfer	Summer		Free	kerkida.net
4	DF	(Montenegro)	Savo Pavićević	45	Non-EU	Maccabi Tel Aviv	Transfer	Summer		Free	kerkida.net
27	DF	(Israel)	Oz Raly	38	Non-EU	Bnei Yehuda	Transfer	Summer		Free	kerkida.net
26	GK	(Israel)	Ohad Levita	40	EU	Hapoel Be'er Sheva	Transfer	Summer		Free	kerkida.net
60	MF	(Cape Verde)	Marco Soares	42	EU	União de Leiria	Transfer	Summer		Free	omonoia.com.cy
14	DF	(Brazil)	Danielson	45	Non-EU	Nacional	Transfer	Summer		Free	omonoia.com.cy
8	MF	(Algeria)	Hamer Bouazza	41	EU	Millwall	Transfer	Summer		Free	omonoia.com.cy
21	MF	(Portugal)	Nuno Assis	48	EU	Vitória de Guimarães	Transfer	Summer		Free	omonoia.com.cy
6	MF	(Portugal)	João Alves	46	EU	Vitória de Guimarães	Transfer	Summer		Free	omonoia.com.cy
23	DF	(Portugal)	João Paulo Andrade	45	EU	Vitória de Guimarães	Transfer	Summer		Free	omonoia.com.cy
30	MF	(Malta)	André Schembri	40	EU	Panionios	Transfer	Summer		Free	omonoia.com.cy
8	FW	(Cyprus)	Onisiforos Roushias	34	EU	Enosis Neon Paralimni (Cyprus)	Transfer	Winter		Free	kerkida.net
31	GK	(Portugal)	José Moreira	44	EU	Free agent	Transfer	Winter		Free	

Out:

No.	Pos.	Nat.	Name	Age	EU	Moving to	Type	Transfer window	Transfer fee	Source
8	MF	(France)	Bryan Bergougnoux	43	EU	Lecce	Loan return	Summer	Free	
16	MF	(Zimbabwe)	Noel Kaseke	45	Non-EU	Alki Larnaca (Cyprus)	Released	Summer	Free	
46	FW	(Cyprus)	Efstathios Aloneftis	43	EU	APOEL	Released	Summer	Free	kerkida.net
6	MF	(Switzerland)	Vero Salatić	41	EU	Grasshopper Club Zürich	Released	Summer	600.000 €	kerkida.net
1	GK	(Montenegro)	Dragoslav Jevrić	52	Non-EU		Retired	Summer	Free	
19	DF	(Israel)	Dedi Ben Dayan	47	Non-EU	Hapoel Acre	Released	Summer	Free	
	FW	(Cyprus)	Theodosis Kyprou	45	EU	Ermis Aradippou	Loan	Summer	Free	
13	MF	(Cyprus)	Constantinos Makrides	44	EU	Metalurh Donetsk (Ukraine)	Transfer	Summer	Free	
26	FW	(Cyprus)	Ioannis Chadjivasilis	36	EU	Aris Limassol	Loan	Summer	Free	
30	GK	(Cyprus)	Antonis Georgallides	44	EU	Alki Larnaca	Transfer	Summer	Free	
20	DF	(Algeria)	Sofiane Cherfa	42	EU	Panthrakikos	Loan	Summer	Free	omonoia.com.cy
8	MF	(Algeria)	Hamer Bouazza	41	EU	Racing Santander	Released	Summer	Free	omonoia.com.cy
29	DF	(Spain)	Iago Bouzón	43	EU	Xerez CD	Released	Summer	Free	omonoia.com.cy
5	DF	(Greece)	Christos Karipidis	43	EU	APOEL (Cyprus)	Released	Summer	Free	omonoia.com.cy
27	DF	(Israel)	Oz Raly	38	Non-EU		Released	Summer	Free	
4	DF	(Montenegro)	Savo Pavićević	45	Non-EU	Maccabi Tel Aviv	Transfer	Winter	Free	
11	MF	(Cyprus)	Andreas Avraam	39	EU	Anorthosis Famagusta (Cyprus)	Transfer	Winter	275.000 €	
1	MF	(Switzerland)	Johnny Leoni	42	EU	Neftçi Baku	Loan	Winter	Free	

Last updated: 31-8-2012

== Squad stats ==
				Total						Cypriot First Division					Cypriot Cup					UEFA Europa League				
Country	N	P	Name	GS	A	Mins.	Gls.	Y	R	A	Mins.	Gls.	Y	R	A	Mins.	Gls.	Y	R	A	Mins.	Gls.	Y	R
(Switzerland)	1	GK	Leoni	5	7	660				3	270				2	180				2	210			
(Nigeria)	2	CB	Alabi	22	25	2259	3	4	1	21	1899	3	3	1	4	360		1						
(Montenegro)	4	CB	Pavićević	5	5	435		4		3	225		3							2	210		1	
(Portugal)	6	CM	J.Alves	14	8	659	4			4	525	2			3	133	2			1	1			
(Cyprus)	7	LW	Efrem	21	17	1551	6	2		14	1331	5	2		3	220	1							
(Angola)	9	CF	Freddy	23	17	1374	8	5		11	1091	6	3		4	151	2	1		2	132		1	
(Portugal)	10	CM	Aguiar	9	5	349		3		2	253		2		1	28				2	68		1	
(Cyprus)	11	LM	Avraam	4	7	406	1			4	221	1			2	102				1	83			
(Brazil)	14	CB	Danielson	16	13	1150	1	2		10	932	1	2		1	8				2	210			
(France)	17	LB	Scaramozzino	23	29	2594		8		23	2070		6		4	314		1		2	210		1	
(Cyprus)	18	LB	Charalambous	3	2	113		1		1	23		1		1	90								
(Portugal)	21	AM	Assis	23	27	2365	2	5	1	22	1982	1	5	1	3	241	1			2	142			
(Portugal)	23	CB	J.P.Andrade	17	16	1343	2	2		13	1117	2	2		3	226								
(Israel)	24	RB	Spungin	20	22	1976		5		18	1662		4		2	104				2	210		1	
(Brazil)	25	CF	Alves	23	22	1887	11	1		17	1508	9	1		3	253	2			2	126			
(Israel)	26	GK	Levita	18	19	1710		1		18	1620		1		1	90								
(Portugal)	28	LB	Margaça	12	11	573	1	2	1	6	260	1	2	1	3	210				2	103			
(Malta)	30	MF	Schembri		23	1181	6	1		20	977	4			3	204	2	1						
(Greece)	32	GK	Giannikoglou																					
(Cyprus)	40	CM	Kyriakou		12	821		2		10	663		2		2	158								
(Hungary)	44	AM	Leandro	7	30	2504	5	5		24	1981	5	4		4	338		1		2	185			
(Cape Verde)	60	DM	Soares	7	25	2018	3	3		21	1656	3	2		2	152				2	210		1	
(Cyprus)	77	RW	Christofi	7	31	2631	7	2		26	2203	7	1		3	218				2	210		1	

Last updated: October 10, 2012
Source: Match reports in competitive matches, omonoia.com.cy
Ordered by start team, game starts and position on pitch (from back right to front left)
0 shown as blank
Country: when 2 flags, 1st flag = country that plays for internationally, 2nd flag = country of birth; N = number on jersey; P = Position; Name = Name on jersey (for more extended name, pause the mouse pointer on the name); GS = Game Started; A = Appearances.

=== Top scorers ===
R	Player	Position	Nat.	League	Cup	Super Cup	Total
1	Andre Alves	FW	(Brazil)	16	2	1	19
2	Efrem	MF	(Cyprus)	7	1	1	9
3	Freddy	FW	(Angola)	6	2	1	9
4	André Schembri	MF	(Malta)	7	2	0	9
5	Demetris Christofi	FW	(Cyprus)	8	0	0	8
6	Leandro	MF	(Hungary)	6	0	1	7
7	J.Alves	MF	(Portugal)	1	2	0	3
8	Alabi	DF	(Nigeria)	3	0	0	3
9	Soares	MF	(Cape Verde)	3	0	0	3
10	Assis	MF	(Portugal)	2	1	0	3
11	J.P.Andrade	DF	(Portugal)	2	0	0	2
12	Avraam	MF	(Cyprus)	1	0	1	2
13	Danielson	DF	(Brazil)	1	0	0	1
14	Margaça	MD	(Portugal)	1	0	0	1
TOTAL				64	10	5	79

Last updated: March 18, 2013
Source: Match reports in Competitive matches

=== Captains ===
1. (Hungary) Leandro
2. (Portugal) Bruno Aguiar

== Competitions ==
=== Overall ===
Competition	Started round	Current position / round	Final position / round	First match	Last match
Cypriot First Division	—	—	3rd	2 September 2012	18 May 2013
UEFA Europa League	3rd qualifying	—	3rd qualifying	2 August 2012	9 August 2012
Cypriot Cup	2nd round	—	Semi-finals	9 January 2013	17 April 2013
LTV Super Cup	Final	—	Winner	18 August 2012	

Updated to match played 18 May 2013
Source: Competitions

=== Pre-season ===
07-07-2012 Friendly	Pogoń Szczecin	1 – 1	Omonia	Opalenica Stadium
16:00 EET	Ława 24'	report	Margaça 13'

10-07-2012 Friendly	Wisła Kraków	0 – 1	Omonia	Opalenica Stadium
19:00 EET		report	Alves 28' (pen.)

14-07-2012 Friendly	Žalgiris Vilnius	1 – 2	Omonia	Opalenica Stadium
19:00 EET	Radavičius 30'	report	Freddy 67' (pen.); Margaça 75'

18-07-2012 Friendly	Omonia	1 – 0	Korona Kielce	Jarocin Stadium
12:30 EET	Christofi 15'	report

18-07-2012 Friendly	Omonia	2 – 0	Zawisza Bydgoszcz	Jarocin Stadium
12:30 EET	Freddy 12'; Christofi 41'	report

22-07-2012 Friendly	Omonia	0 – 0	Doxa Katokopia	GSP Stadium
19:00 EET		report		Attendance: 5.893; Referee: (Cyprus) Marios Panagi

27-07-2012 Friendly	Omonia	1 – 1	Willem II	GSP Stadium
19:00 EET	Scaramozzino 31'	report	Sanusi 68'	Referee: (Cyprus) Christos Nikolaides

25-08-2012 Friendly	Omonia	3 – 0	Adonis Idaliou	Elias Poullos
18:00 EET	Schembri 10'; Freddy 56'; Assis 64'	report

=== Cypriot First Division ===
==== Classification ====
Pos	Team	Pld	W	D	L	GF	GA	GD	Pts	Qualification or relegation
2	Anorthosis Famagusta	26	18	6	2	57	21	+36	60	Qualification for second round, Group A
3	AEK Larnaca	26	17	4	5	50	21	+29	55	Qualification for second round, Group A
4	Omonia Nicosia	26	16	5	5	51	22	+29	53	Qualification for second round, Group A
5	AEL Limassol	26	14	9	3	46	26	+20	51	Qualification for second round, Group B
6	Apollon Limassol	26	11	7	8	32	24	+8	40	Qualification for second round, Group B

Source: CFA
Rules for classification: 1) points; 2) head-to-head points; 3) head-to-head goal difference; 4) head-to-head away goals scored; 5) goal difference; 6) number of goals scored

==== Results summary ====
Overall								Home						Away					
Pld	W	D	L	GF	GA	GD	Pts	W	D	L	GF	GA	GD	W	D	L	GF	GA	GD
32	20	6	6	66	27	+39	66	13	1	2	40	9	+31	7	5	4	26	18	+8

Last updated: May 18, 2013.
Source: UEFA

==== Results by round ====
Round	1	2	3	4	5	6	7	8	9	10	11	12	13	14	15	16	17	18	19	20	21	22	23	24	25	26	27	28	29	30	31	32
Ground	H	A	H	A	H	A	H	A	H	A	H	H	A	A	H	A	H	A	H	A	H	A	H	A	A	H	H	A	A	H	A	H
Result	W	D	L	D	D	L	W	D	W	L	W	W	W	W	W	L	W	D	L	W	W	W	W	W	W	W	W	W	D	W	L	W

Updated to match(es) played on May 18, 2013. Source:
A = Away; H = Home; W = Win; D = Draw; L = Loss

==== Matches ====
Kick-off times are in CET.

==== Regular season ====
02–09–2012 Matchweek 1	Omonia	5 – 0	Ayia Napa	GSP Stadium
18:00	Fabeta 49' (o.g.); Leandro 57'; Christofi 60'; Avraam 62'; Freddy 85' (pen.)	Report		Attendance: Behind closed doors Referee: Savvas Zafeiris

15–09–2012 Matchweek 2	Ethnikos Achna	1 – 1	Omonia	Dasaki Stadium
19:00	Penta 84'	Report	Christofi 12'	Attendance: 2,000; Referee: Charalampos Skapoullis

22–09–2012 Matchweek 3	Omonia	0 – 1	AEK Larnaca	GSP Stadium
18:00		Report	Alex da Silva 84'	Attendance: Behind closed doors Referee: Leontios Trattos

29-09-2012 Matchweek 4	AEL Limassol	1 – 1	Omonia	Tsirion Stadium
18:00	Bebê 24'	Report	Freddy 12'	Attendance: 10,500; Referee: Marios Panayi

07-10-2012 Matchweek 5	Omonia	0 – 0	APOEL	GSP Stadium
17:00		Report		Attendance: 14,011; Referee: Demetris Chrysostomou

21-10-2012 Matchweek 6	Anorthosis	2 – 0	Omonia	Antonis Papadopoulos Stadium
17:00	Spadacio 5' (pen.); Rezek 90+13'	Report		Attendance: 8,500; Referee: Leontios Trattou

27-10-2012 Matchweek 7	Omonia	2 – 0	Enosis	GSP Stadium
17:00	Leandro 83'; Schembri 86'	Report		Attendance: 5,601; Referee: Kostas Psevdiotis

03-11-2012 Matchweek 8	Doxa Katokopia	1 – 1	Omonia	Ammochostos Stadium
17:00	Fernandes 90+2'	Report	Alves 70' (pen.)	Attendance: 2,500; Referee: Savvas Zaphiris

11-11-2012 Matchweek 9	Omonia	1 – 0	Alki Larnaca	GSP Stadium
17:00	Leandro 72'; Nuno Assis (yellow card) 88'	Summary	Cirillo (yellow card) 22'; Gerasimos Fylaktou (yellow card) 85'	Attendance: 4,802; Referee: Vasilis Demetriou

18-11-2012 Matchweek 10	Apollon Limassol	2 – 1	Omonia	Tsirion Stadium
17:00	Miguelito (yellow card) 36'; Parlov 51'; Charalambous (yellow card) 70'; Theodoridis 77'; Souanis (yellow card) 82'; Bruno Vale (yellow card) 90'	Summary	Leandro 27'; Alabi (red card) 39'	Attendance: 6,876; Referee: Marios Nikolaou

24-11-2012 Matchweek 11	Omonia	4 – 2	AEP Paphos	GSP Stadium
18:00	Freddy 6' (pen.); Efrem 53'; Renato Margaça 65'; Scaramozzino (yellow card) 68'; João Alves 88'	Summary	Tall (yellow card) 6'; Kiliaras (yellow card) 29'; Aguinaldo (yellow card) 38'; Hugo Sousa (yellow card) 71'; Silas 77', 80'	Attendance: 4,158; Referee: Antonis Christodoulou

03-12-2012 Matchweek 12	Omonia	2 – 0	Olympiakos Nicosia	GSP Stadium
19:00	Freddy 49', 65' (pen.)	Summary		Attendance: 2,281; Referee: Yiannis Anastasiou

08-12-2012 Matchweek 13	Nea Salamina	0 – 1	Omonia	Ammochostos Stadium
17:00		Summary	Soares 78'	Attendance: 2,700; Referee: C. Skapoullis

15-12-2012 Matchweek 14	Ayia Napa	0 – 3	Omonia	Tasos Markou Stadium
17:00		Summary	Schembri 53'; Alves 53'; Christofi 69'	Attendance: 1,000; Referee: D. Chrysostomou

22-12-2012 Matchweek 15	Omonia	2 – 1	Ethnikos Achna	GSP Stadium
17:00	Alabi 19'; Schembri 44'	Summary	Oseni 77'	Attendance: 6,887; Referee: V. Demetriou

06-01-2013 Matchweek 16	AEK Larnaca	2 – 1	Omonia	GSZ Stadium
16:00	Pintado 3', 13'	Summary	Danielson 27'	Attendance: 3900; Referee: C. Nikolaides

20-01-2013 Matchweek 17	Omonia	2 – 0	AEL Limassol	GSP Stadium
13:30	Christofi 42'; Freddy 84'	Summary		Attendance: 6787; Referee: D. Chrysostomou

19-01-2013 Matchweek 18	APOEL	1 – 1	Omonia	GSP Stadium, Nicosia
14:30 EET	Pinto 15'	Summary	Alabi 60'; Margaça (red card) 78'	Attendance: 15,727; Referee: Vasilis Demetriou

26-02-2013 Matchweek 19	Omonia	1 – 3	Anorthosis	GSP Stadium
13:30 EET	Alves 90'	Summary	Barak Yitzhaki 55'; Barak Yitzhaki 65'; Jan Rezek 77'; Jan Rezek (red card) 85'	Attendance: 10,217; Referee: Y. Anastasiou

02-02-2013 Matchweek 20	Enosis	0 – 1	Omonia	Tasos Markou Stadium
17:00 EET		Summary	Alves 66'	Attendance: 800; Referee: M. Panayi

10-02-2013 Matchweek 21	Omonia	3 – 0	Doxa Katokopia	GSP Stadium
17:00 EET	Efrem 16'; Leandro 52'; Efrem 55'	Summary		Attendance: 5,000; Referee: A. Christodoulou

26-02-2013 Matchweek 22	Alki Larnaca	2 – 4	Omonia	GSZ Stadium
17:00	Bernardo Vasconcelos 64'; Bernardo Vasconcelos 75'	Summary	J.P.Andrade 32'; Alves 38'; Christofi 58'; Alabi 66'	Attendance: 1,500; Referee: L. Trattou

02-03-2013 Matchweek 23	Omonia	2 – 1	Apollon Limassol	GSP Stadium
17:00	Christofi 9'; J.P.Andrade 45'	Summary	Esteban Solari 53'	Attendance: 8,135; Referee: V. Demetriou

09-03-2013 Matchweek 24	AEP Paphos	1 – 2	Omonia	Pafiako Stadium
15:00	Alexandros Garpozis 65' (pen.)	Summary	Schembri 2'; Christofi 11'	Attendance: 1,300; Referee: D. Masias

16-03-2013 Matchweek 25	Olympiakos Nicosia	1 – 4	Omonia	GSP Stadium
15:00	Henrique 10'	Summary	Alves 8'; Alves 31'; Alves 73'; Efrem 77'	Attendance: 2,043; Referee: L. Trattou

30-03-2013 Matchweek 26	Omonia	6 – 0	Nea Salamina	GSP Stadium
14:30	Soares 21'; Assis 25'; Soares 52'; Efrem 63'; Alves 65'; Alves 87'	Summary		Attendance: 7,254; Referee: M. Panayi

==== Group A ====
Pos	Team	Pld	W	D	L	GF	GA	GD	Pts	Qualification
1	APOEL (C)	32	23	4	5	62	19	+43	73	Qualification for Champions League third qualifying round
2	Anorthosis Famagusta	32	20	8	4	60	29	+31	68	Qualification for Europa League second qualifying round
3	Omonia Nicosia	32	20	6	6	66	27	+39	66	Qualification for Europa League second qualifying round
4	AEK Larnaca	32	19	4	9	55	28	+27	61	

Source: UEFA
Rules for classification: 1) points; 2) head-to-head points; 3) head-to-head goal difference; 4) head-to-head goals scored; 5) goal difference; 6) number of goals scored.
(C) Champions

===== Results =====
06-04-2013 Matchweek 1	Omonia	3 – 0	APOEL	GSP Stadium
16:30 EET	Efrem 15'; Leandro 54'; Efrem 65'	(Summary)		Attendance: 13,757; Referee: C. Nikolaides

13-04-2013 Matchweek 2	AEK Larnaca	0 – 2	Omonia	GSZ Stadium
16:30 EET		(Summary)	Schembri 11'; Alves 36'	Attendance: 4,000; Referee: D. Masias

20-04-2013 Matchweek 3	Anorthosis	0 – 0	Omonia	Antonis Papadopoulos Stadium
17:00 EET		(Summary)		Attendance: 4,000; Referee: Y. Anastasiou

28-04-2013 Matchweek 4	Omonia	4 – 0	Anorthosis	GSP Stadium
16:30 EET	Alves 5'; Schembri 83'; Assis 86'; Alves 89'	(Summary)		Attendance: 8,242; Referee: C. Skapoullis

11-05-2013 Matchweek 5	APOEL	4 –3	Omonia	GSP Stadium
16:30 EET	Aloneftis 1'; Budimir 60'; Morais 71'; Manduca 83' (pen.)	(Summary)	Karipidis 19' (o.g.); Christofi 54'; Alves 74'	Attendance: 15,365; Referee: Vasilis Demetriou

18-05-2013 Matchweek 6	Omonia	3 –1	AEK Larnaca	GSP Stadium
16:30 EET	Schembri 18'; Alves 42'; Alves 92' (pen.)	(Summary)	Edwin Linssen 14'	Attendance: 11,656; Referee: Y. Anastasiou

=== UEFA Europa League ===
==== Third qualifying round ====
02-08-2012 First Leg	Red Star Belgrade (Serbia)	0 – 0	(Cyprus) Omonia	Red Star Stadium
21:30		report		Attendance: 26,930; Referee: (Austria) René Eisner

09-08-2012 Second Leg	Omonia (Cyprus)	0 – 0 (a.e.t.) (5 – 6 p)	(Serbia) Red Star Belgrade	GSP Stadium
19:00		report		Attendance: 13,312; Referee: (Sweden) Michael Lerjéus
	Penalties
	Andre Alves (penalty scored); Freddy (penalty scored); Pavićević (penalty missed); Christofi (penalty scored); Aguiar (penalty scored); Scaramozzino (penalty scored); Danielson (penalty missed)		(penalty scored) Dimitrijević; (penalty scored) Milivojević; (penalty missed) Kasalica; (penalty scored) Maksimović; (penalty scored) Milunović; (penalty scored) Mladenović; (penalty scored) Mijailović

=== Cypriot Cup ===
==== Second round ====
09-01-2013 First Leg	Ethnikos Achna	0 – 2	Omonia	Dasaki Stadium
17:00 EET		(Report)	João Alves 54'; João Alves 64'	Attendance: 500; Referee: T. Mouskos

16-01-2013 Second Leg	Omonia	2 – 0	Ethnikos Achna	GSP Stadium
17:00 EET	Andre Alves 59'; Andre Alves 84'	(Report)		Attendance: 1500; Referee: M. Nikolaou

==== Quarter-finals ====
13-02-2013 Quarter-finals	Omonia	4 – 0	Anorthosis	GSP Stadium
14:30 EET	Efrem 39'; Assis 62'; Freddy 90'; Schembri 90+15'	(Report)		Attendance: 8004; Referee: D. Chrysostomou

06-03-2013 Quarter-finals	Anorthosis	0 –2	Omonia	Antonis Papadopoulos Stadium
14:30 EET		(Report)	Schembri 59'; Freddy 82'	Attendance: 1500; Referee: T. Mouskos

==== Semi final ====
10-04-2013 Semi-final	Omonia	0 – 0	AEL Limassol	GSP Stadium
16:00		(Summary)		Attendance: 10700; Referee: M. Panayi

17-04-2013 Semi-final	AEL Limassol	1 – 0	Omonia	Tsirion Stadium
16:00	Vouho 45'	(Summary)		Attendance: 9,432; Referee: V. Demetriou

=== LTV Super Cup ===
18-08-2012 Final	AEL Limassol	3 – 5	Omonia	Antonis Papadopoulos Stadium
20:00	Konstantinou 21', 56' (pen.); Rui Miguel 72'	report	Leandro 20'; A.Alves 35'; Avraam 45'; Freddy 64'; Efrem 90'	Attendance: 3,000; Referee: (Cyprus) Marios Tsaggaris
