= Bruno Aguiar (Portuguese footballer) =

Portuguese footballer (born 1981)

Personal information
- Full name: Bruno João Morais Aguiar
- Date of birth: 24 February 1981 (age 45)
- Place of birth: Lisbon, Portugal
- Height: 1.77 m (5 ft 10 in)
- Position: Midfielder

Youth career
- 1992–2000: Benfica

Senior career*
Years	Team	Apps	(Gls)
2000–2005	Benfica B	46	(4)
2004–2005	Benfica	19	(0)
2002	→ Gil Vicente (loan)	3	(0)
2002–2004	→ Alverca (loan)	46	(6)
2006	FBK Kaunas	0	(0)
2006–2009	Hearts	61	(10)
2009–2014	Omonia	73	(6)
2014–2016	Oriental	55	(3)
Total		303	(29)

International career
2001–2002	Portugal U20	11	(1)
2001–2004	Portugal U21	6	(0)
2005	Portugal B	2	(0)
Medal record
Men's football
Representing Portugal
UEFA European Under-21 Championship
Third place	2004 Germany
- * Club domestic league appearances and goals

Bruno João Morais Aguiar (born 24 February 1981) is a Portuguese former professional footballer who played as a midfielder. After an unsuccessful spell with Benfica, although he contributed to the team's first Primeira Liga title in over a decade, he left the club in 2005, going on to play professionally in Scotland and Cyprus.

== Club career ==
=== Benfica ===
Born in Lisbon, Aguiar grew in local Benfica's youth system, but spent the vast majority of his spell as a senior with their reserves. Additionally, he also served two loans, at Gil Vicente – six months – and Alverca, helping the former farm team return to the Primeira Liga in the second of his two full seasons, after which he returned to his alma mater.

Under Giovanni Trapattoni, hired for the 2004–05 campaign, Aguiar would make all of his appearances for Benfica's main squad, his first being a UEFA Champions League third qualifying round against Anderlecht on 10 August 2004 (1–0 home win, 3–1 aggregate loss). He also contributed with 19 matches (840 minutes) as they won the domestic league for the first time since 1994; after the Italian was replaced by Ronald Koeman, however, he fell out of favour and was released from contract.

=== Heart of Midlothian ===
In January 2006, Aguiar signed for FBK Kaunas, who immediately loaned him to Heart of Midlothian, both clubs being owned by Vladimir Romanov. He made his competitive debut in a 1–2 defeat to Aberdeen in February, and made a further 11 appearances before the end of the season, helping the side finish in second place in the Scottish Premier League and adding the Scottish Cup.

2006–07 did not start so well for Aguiar, as he was sent off in the first leg of Hearts' Champions League third round qualifier against AEK Athens, after receiving a second yellow card for throwing the ball away with a 1–0 lead – the Greek utilised their subsequent one-man advantage to win it 2–1. A lengthy eighteen-month injury layoff soon followed for the player, and he made his return to first-team action in October 2008, in the Edinburgh Derby where he scored a free-kick to earn his team a draw; on 9 December he was awarded the Clydesdale Bank Premier League Player of the Month award for the previous month, and ended the 2008–09 season as top scorer in the squad with seven goals.

On 1 June 2009, Hearts confirmed Aguiar's departure following the expiration of his contract, leaving him free to sign with another club. He stated that he had enjoyed his time at the Tynecastle Stadium, with the Scottish Cup victory and second-place finish in the league in 2006 being personal highlights, as well as wishing them the best for the future.

=== Omonia ===
A free agent, Aguiar signed for Omonia from Cyprus in June 2009. He left five years later at the age of 33 after helping the Nicosia club to five major titles, including the 2009–10 edition of the Cypriot First Division championship where he appeared in 15 games, scoring once; he subsequently returned to his homeland, and joined Clube Oriental de Lisboa.

In November 2016, shortly after his last team's relegation from the Segunda Liga, Aguiar announced his retirement.

== International career ==
Aguiar was a member of the Portugal under-21 team that finished third at the 2004 UEFA European Championship and qualified for the Athens Olympics, along with several future full internationals such as Hugo Almeida, Bruno Alves, José Bosingwa, Danny, Raul Meireles and Hugo Viana. He did not make, however, the final cut for the latter competition.

== Career statistics ==
=== Club ===
Appearances and goals by club, season and competition
Club	Season	League			National cup		League cup		Europe		Other		Total	
Club	Season	Division	Apps	Goals	Apps	Goals	Apps	Goals	Apps	Goals	Apps	Goals	Apps	Goals
Benfica	2001–02	Primeira Liga	0	0	0	0	—		0	0	—		0	0
Benfica	2004–05	Primeira Liga	19	0	5	0	—		6 (Note: Appearances in UEFA Cup and UEFA Champions League)	0	—		30	0
Benfica	2005–06	Primeira Liga	0	0	0	0	—		0	0	—		0	0
Benfica	Total		19	0	5	0	0	0	6	0	0	0	30	0
Gil Vicente (loan)	2001–02	Primeira Liga	3	0	0	0	—		—		—		3	0
Alverca (loan)	2002–03	Segunda Liga	29	4	2	0	—		—		—		31	4
Alverca (loan)	2003–04	Primeira Liga	17	2	0	0	—		—		—		17	2
Alverca (loan)	Total		46	6	2	0	0	0	0	0	0	0	48	6
Heart of Midlothian	2005–06	Scottish Premier League	10	1	2	0	0	0	—		—		12	1
Heart of Midlothian	2006–07	Scottish Premier League	25	2	1	0	2	1	5	0	—		33	3
Heart of Midlothian	2007–08	Scottish Premier League	0	0	0	0	0	0	0	0	—		0	0
Heart of Midlothian	2008–09	Scottish Premier League	26	7	1	0	0	0	—		—		27	7
Heart of Midlothian	Total		61	10	4	0	2	1	5	0	0	0	72	11
Omonia	2009–10	Cypriot First Division	15	1			—		4 (Note: Appearances in UEFA Europa League)	0	—		19	1
Omonia	2010–11	Cypriot First Division	19	1	0	0	—		0	0	1 (Note: Appearances in Cypriot Super Cup)	0	20	1
Omonia	2011–12	Cypriot First Division	18	3	5	2	—		2	0	1	0	26	5
Omonia	2012–13	Cypriot First Division	13	1	2	0	—		2	0	0	0	17	1
Omonia	2013–14	Cypriot First Division	8	0	0	0	—		0	0	—		8	0
Omonia	Total		73	6	7	2	0	0	8	0	2	0	90	8
Oriental	2014–15	Segunda Liga	24	2	1	0	2	0	—		—		27	2
Oriental	2015–16	Segunda Liga	4	0	0	0	1	0	—		—		5	0
Oriental	Total		28	2	1	0	3	0	0	0	0	0	32	2
Career total			230	24	19	2	5	1	19	0	2	0	275	27

== Honours ==
Benfica

- Primeira Liga: 2004–05
- Taça de Portugal runner-up: 2004–05
- Supertaça Cândido de Oliveira runner-up: 2004

Hearts

- Scottish Cup: 2005–06

Omonia

- Cypriot First Division: 2009–10
- Cypriot Cup: 2010–11, 2011–12
- Cypriot Super Cup: 2010, 2012
