= Sofyane Cherfa =

Algerian professional footballer (born 1984)

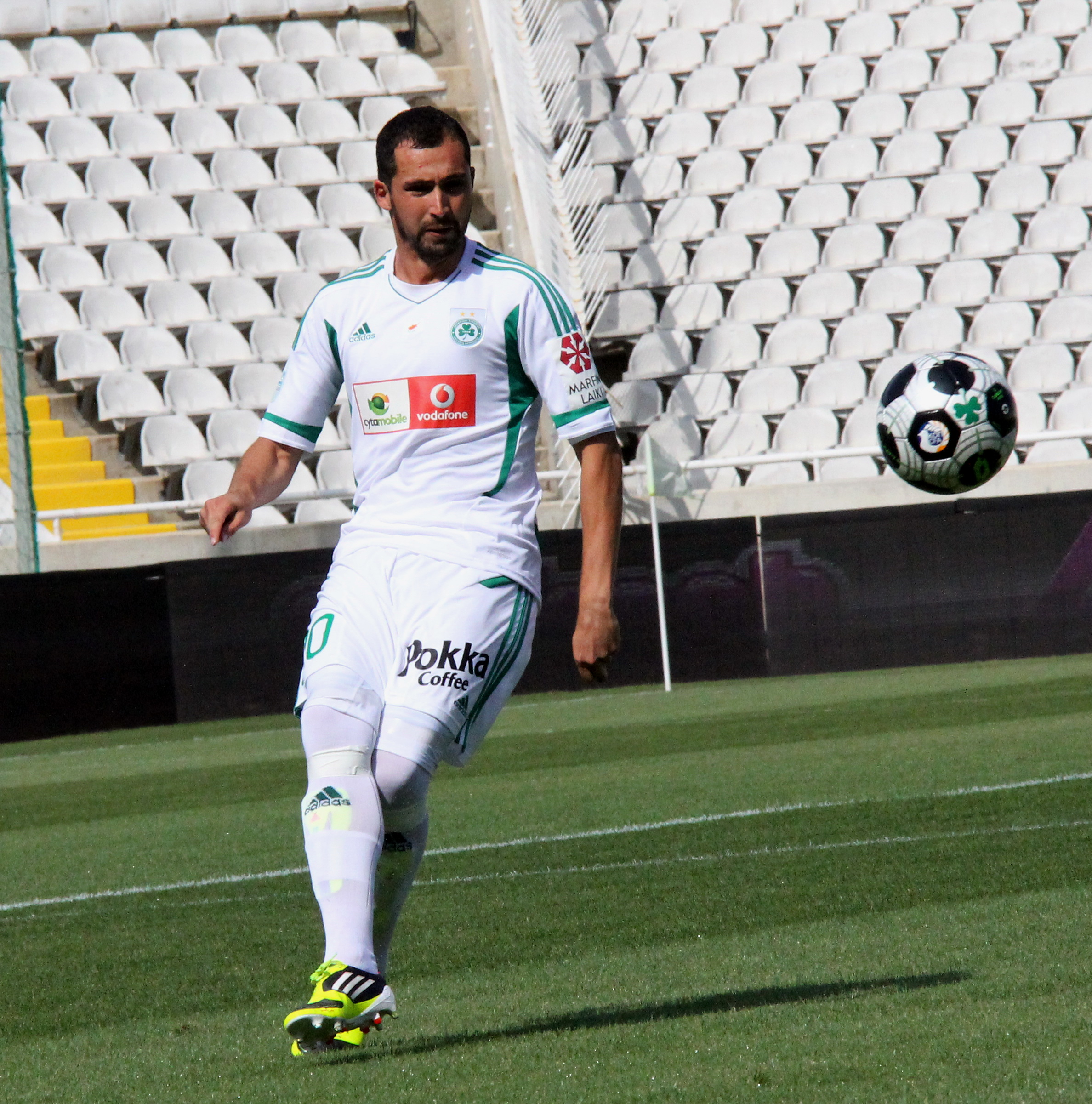
- Cherfa in action for Omonia in 2012

Personal information
- Full name: Sofyane Cherfa
- Date of birth: 13 August 1984 (age 42)
- Place of birth: Toulouse, France
- Height: 1.84 m (6 ft 0 in)
- Position: Centre-back

Team information
- Current team: AEK Athens U19 (manager)

Youth career
- Monaco

Senior career*
Years	Team	Apps	(Gls)
2002–2005	Monaco B		
2005–2007	Louhans-Cuiseaux	59	(5)
2007–2008	Reims	30	(2)
2008–2009	Sedan	15	(0)
2009–2011	Châteauroux	40	(0)
2011–2014	Omonia	49	(3)
2012–2013	→ Panthrakikos (loan)	29	(0)
2014–2016	Panthrakikos	29	(0)
2016–2017	Costantine	33	(1)
2018	Abano	2	(0)
2018–2019	Alki Oroklini	20	(0)
2019–2020	Akritas Chlorakas	10	(0)

Managerial career
- 2020–2021: Omonia Aradippou (assistant)
- 2021: Doxa Katokopias (assistant)
- 2021–2023: Thonon Evian
- 2023–2024: Bourg-Péronnas U19
- 2024–: AEK Athens U19
- * Club domestic league appearances and goals

Sofyane Cherfa (Arabic: سفيان شرفة; born 13 August 1984) is an Algerian professional football manager and former player. He is the current manager of Greek club AEK Athens U19.

== Club career ==
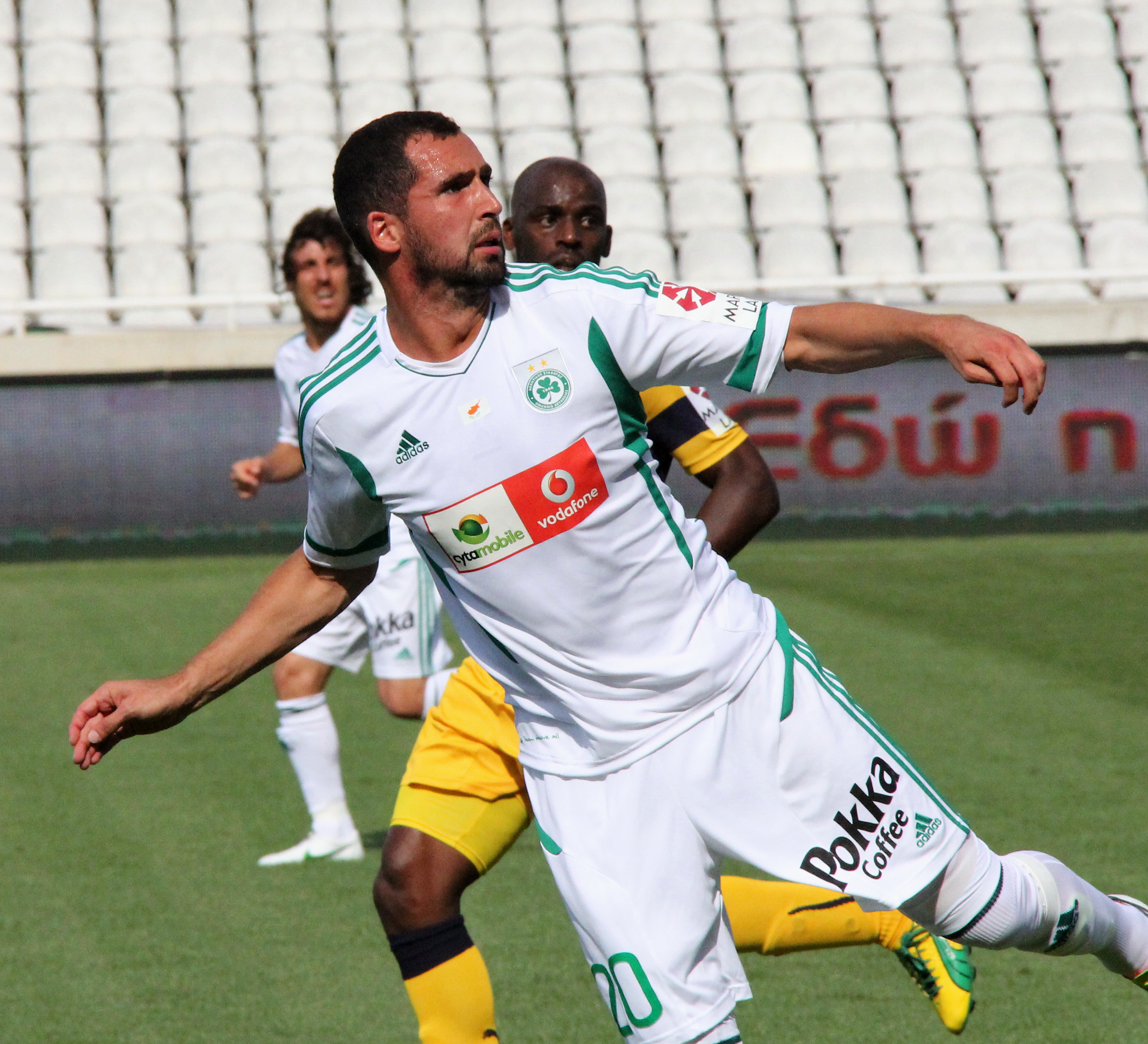
Cherfa playing for Omonia against AEL Limassol in April 2012.

=== Early career ===
Born in Toulouse, France, Cherfa played youth football with AS Monaco FC, but only appeared for its reserve team as a senior. After playing with CS Louhans-Cuiseaux in the lower leagues he signed with Ligue 2 club Stade de Reims in the summer of 2007, before going on to represent also in the competition CS Sedan Ardennes and LB Châteauroux.

=== Omonia ===
In 2011, Cherfa joined AC Omonia in the Cypriot First Division, after fellow league side Ermis Aradippou FC did not have the financial means to complete the transfer. He scored his first goal as a professional on 29 October of that year in a 2–0 away win against Olympiakos Nicosia, and also contributed with six appearances in the season's Cypriot Cup, which ended in conquest as in the previous year.

In the 2012 summer transfer window, after being deemed surplus to requirements, Cherfa was loaned to Panthrakikos F.C. from Greece. At the end of the campaign he returned to Omonia, who had just lost fellow stoppers Christos Karipidis and Savo Pavićević to other clubs, but Panthrakikos contested that the agreement ended sooner than it should have.

After failing to negotiate a new contract with a smaller wage, due to Omonia's financial situation, Cherfa was made to train alone, and was eventually linked to OFI even though the former stated it did not have the intention of releasing him. After the team failed to perform in their UEFA Europa League campaign, both defensively and overall, a new round of talks started, and he eventually put pen to paper to a new three-year deal.

=== Later years ===
On 15 January 2016, four days after being released by Panthrakikos, Cherfa signed a two-year contract with Algerian club CS Constantine. Two years later, the free agent agreed to a one-year deal at Italian amateurs Abano Calcio.

Cherfa returned to the Cypriot top level on 27 July 2018, joining Alki Oroklini for one season. On 18 August 2019, he joined Akritas Chlorakas.

== International ==
In April 2005, Cherfa was called up to the Algerian under-23 team for a mini training camp in France.

== Personal life ==
Cherfa's younger brother, Walid, was also a footballer. A defender, he too played most of his career in France.

== Club statistics ==
As of match played 2 January 2016

Appearances and goals by club, season and competition
Club	Season	League			Cup (Note: Includes the Coupe de France, Coupe de la Ligue, Cypriot Cup, Cypriot Super Cup, Greek Football Cup)		Europe (Note: Includes the UEFA Europa League)		Total	
Club	Season	Division	Apps	Goals	Apps	Goals	Apps	Goals	Apps	Goals
Louhans-Cuiseaux	2005–06	Championnat National	29	2	1	0	—		30	2
Louhans-Cuiseaux	2006–07	Championnat National	30	3	2	0	—		32	3
Louhans-Cuiseaux	Total		59	5	3	0	0	0	62	5
Reims	2007–08	Ligue 2	30	2	4	0	—		34	2
Sedan	2008–09	Ligue 2	15	0	1	0	—		16	0
Châteauroux	2009–10	Ligue 2	8	0	1	0	—		8	0
Châteauroux	2010–11	Ligue 2	32	0	3	0	—		35	0
Châteauroux	Total		40	0	3	0	0	0	43	0
Omonia	2011–12	Cypriot First Division	22	2	7	1	1	0	30	3
Omonia	2013–14	Cypriot First Division	27	1	3	0	—		30	1
Omonia	Total		49	3	10	1	1	0	60	4
Panthrakikos	2012–13 (loan)	Super League Greece	29	0	8	1	—		37	1
Panthrakikos	2014–15	Super League Greece	14	0	2	0	—		16	0
Panthrakikos	2015–16	Super League Greece	15	0	0	0	—		15	0
Panthrakikos	Total		58	0	10	1	0	0	68	1
Career total			251	10	31	2	1	0	283	12

== Honours ==
Omonia

- Cypriot Cup: 2011–12
