= Sebastian Radzio =

Polish footballer

Personal information
- Full name: Sebastian Radzio
- Date of birth: 2 April 1991 (age 35)
- Place of birth: Augustów, Poland
- Height: 1.85 m (6 ft 1 in)
- Position: Midfielder

Youth career
- 2004: Sparta Augustów
- 2005–2006: Jagiellonia Białystok
- 2006: Pomorzanka Sejny

Senior career*
Years	Team	Apps	(Gls)
2007	Pomorzanka Sejny		
2008	Sparta Augustów	15	(3)
2009–2010	Wigry Suwałki	60	(12)
2011–2013	Widzew Łódź	9	(0)
2012	→ Ruch Radzionków (loan)	12	(1)
2013–2015	Wigry Suwałki	40	(12)
2016	Wigry Suwałki II		
2016–2021	Andrespolia Wiśniowa Góra		
2021–2022	Warta Sieradz	30	(13)
- * Club domestic league appearances and goals

Sebastian Radzio (born 2 April 1991) is a Polish former professional footballer who played as a midfielder. He was forced to take a break from football after suffering from Lyme disease. Following retirement, he became a youth coach.

== Career ==
=== Club ===
In December 2010, he joined Widzew Łódź.

== Honours ==
Wigry Suwałki

- II liga East: 2013–14

Warta Sieradz

- IV liga Łódź: 2021–22
