= Andreas Avraam =

Cypriot footballer (born 1987)

Personal information
- Full name: Andreas Avraam
- Date of birth: 6 June 1987 (age 39)
- Place of birth: Larnaca, Cyprus
- Height: 1.71 m (5 ft 7 in)
- Positions: Left winger; left back

Youth career
- –2006: Omonia Aradippou

Senior career*
Years	Team	Apps	(Gls)
2006–2007	Omonia Aradippou	16	(7)
2007–2010	Apollon Limassol	74	(16)
2010–2013	Omonia Nicosia	57	(5)
2013–2016	Anorthosis Famagusta	71	(9)
2016–2017	AEL	23	(2)
2017–2021	AEL Limassol	91	(6)
2021–2022	Anorthosis Famagusta	7	(0)
2022–2023	Karmiotissa	14	(0)

International career^{‡}
2007–2009	Cyprus U-21		
2009–	Cyprus	41	(5)
- * Club domestic league appearances and goals as of 9 June 2023 ‡ National team caps and goals as of 19 November 2019

Andreas Avraam (Greek: Ανδρέας Αβραάμ; born 6 June 1987) is a Cypriot professional footballer.

== Career ==
He is also a member of the Cyprus national team and has captained the Cyprus U-19. He grew as a player in the Omonia Aradippou in Second Division of Cyprus academies. Apollon Limassol scouter's found this talent and signed him for a fee of 55.000 euros. AC Omonia paid Apollon Limassol 850.000 euros to bring the player to their team.

== Honours ==
AEL Limassol

- Cypriot Cup: 2019

Apollon Limassol

- Cypriot Cup: 2010

Omonia

- Cypriot Cup: 2011, 2012
- Cyprus FA Shield: 2010, 2012

=== International goals ===
Scores and results list Cyprus' goal tally first.

No.	Date	Venue	Opponent	Score	Result	Competition
1.	19 November 2008	GSP Stadium, Nicosia, Cyprus	Belarus	2–0	2–1	Friendly
2.	3 September 2010	Estádio D. Afonso Henriques, Guimarães, Portugal	Portugal	4–4	4–4	UEFA Euro 2012 qualifying
3.	10 August 2011	GSP Stadium, Nicosia, Cyprus	Moldova	1–0	3–2	Friendly
4.	10 August 2011	GSP Stadium, Nicosia, Cyprus	Moldova	2–2	3–2	Friendly
5.	7 October 2011	GSP Stadium, Nicosia, Cyprus	Denmark	1–4	1–4	UEFA Euro 2012 qualifying
