= Oz Raly =

Israeli footballer

Oz Raly עוז ראלי
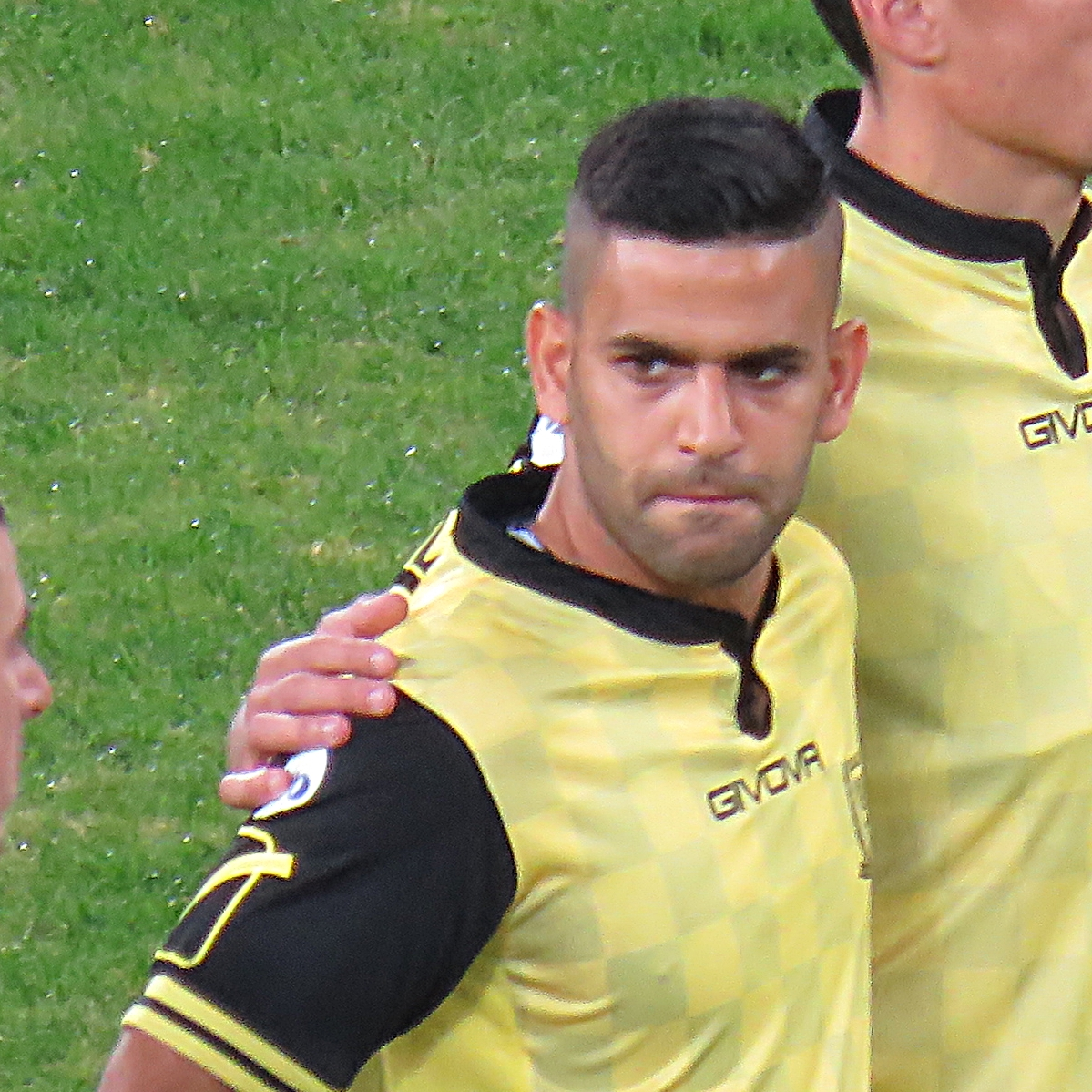

Personal information
- Full name: Oz Raly
- Date of birth: 22 December 1987 (age 38)
- Place of birth: Bat Yam, Israel
- Height: 1.70 m (5 ft 7 in)
- Positions: Right back; right winger

Team information
- Current team: F.C. Holon Yermiyahu

Senior career*
Years	Team	Apps	(Gls)
2005–2016	Bnei Yehuda	260	(18)
2015–2016	→ Maccabi Tel Aviv (loan)	2	(0)
2016	→ Ironi Kiryat Shmona (loan)	15	(0)
2016–2017	Beitar Jerusalem	14	(0)
2017–2018	Hapoel Ashkelon	25	(1)
2018–2019	Beitar Jerusalem	6	(0)
2019–2020	Hapoel Umm al-Fahm	24	(1)
2020–2021	Hapoel Ashdod	19	(2)
2021	F.C. Holon Yermiyahu	14	(3)
2021–2022	Shimshon Kafr Qasim	4	(1)
2022	F.C. Holon Yermiyahu	12	(0)
2022–2023	Maccabi Amishav Petah Tikva	19	(6)

Managerial career
- 2023–: F.C. Ashdod (assistant)
- * Club domestic league appearances and goals

Oz Raly (Hebrew: עוז ראלי; born 22 December 1987) is an Israeli former footballer.

== Club career ==
On 11 June 2012, Raly signed a contract with AC Omonia but he was released from the club before the season started and returned to Bnei Yehuda.
