= Dedi Ben Dayan =

Israeli footballer

Dedi Ben Dayan דוד "דדי" בן דיין
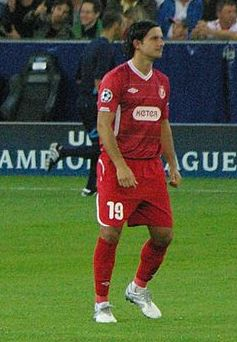
- Ben Dayan playing for Hapoel Tel Aviv in 2010

Personal information
- Full name: David Ben Dayan
- Date of birth: November 22, 1978 (age 47)
- Place of birth: Holon, Israel
- Height: 1.79 m (5 ft 10 1/2 in)
- Position: Left back

Youth career
- 1994–1995: Hapoel Tel Aviv
- 1995–1997: Maccabi Tel Aviv

Senior career*
Years	Team	Apps	(Gls)
1997–2002	Maccabi Tel Aviv	117	(14)
2002	Hapoel Petah Tikva	5	(0)
2003	Hapoel Kfar Saba	9	(0)
2003–2005	Hapoel Be'er Sheva	59	(2)
2005–2006	Colorado Rapids	24	(8)
2006–2009	Maccabi Netanya	86	(14)
2009–2011	Hapoel Tel Aviv	59	(11)
2012	AC Omonia	8	(1)
2012–2013	Hapoel Acre	27	(1)
2013–2014	Bnei Sakhnin	34	(3)
2014–2015	Maccabi Petah Tikva	16	(2)
2015–2017	Maccabi Sha'arayim	19	(1)

International career^{‡}
1994	Israel U16	4	(3)
1996–1997	Israel U18	3	(1)
1998–1999	Israel U21	12	(0)
2000–2012	Israel	28	(1)
- * Club domestic league appearances and goals as of 21 May 2015 ‡ National team caps and goals as of 10 August 2011

David "Dedi" Ben Dayan (Hebrew: דוד "דדי" בן דיין; born November 22, 1978) is a retired Israeli football defender.

== Biography ==
=== Playing career ===
Ben Dayan started his career at Maccabi Tel Aviv, where he saw limited action over the span of 5 seasons. After a break out 2000–01 season, Ben Dayan was called up to the Israel national football team by then manager, Richard Møller Nielsen, for a friendly against Hungary. His most successful club season though was in 2001–02 when he started and helped the club win the Israel State Cup having not played a single fixture in the club's previous cup title.

In 2002, Ben Dayan was transferred to Hapoel Petah Tikva where he would start each match but was unimpressive, usually being the first player substituted. He moved on to Hapoel Kfar Saba but after the club was relegated and Ben Dayan was left in 2003 looking for a new club in a little less than a year.

Ben Dayan would head south to Be'er Sheva to join Hapoel for the 2003–04 season. There he would revive his career playing under Eli Guttman. This even led to him getting a second chance to play on the national team, but he only featured in two friendlies against Azerbaijan and Moldova.

==== Move to the United States ====
After two seasons in Be'er Sheva, Ben Dayan became the second Israeli ever to play in the United States' top football league, Major League Soccer, when he signed a one-year contract with Colorado Rapids (the other was Guy Melamed who was released on a free transfer shortly after Ben Dayan's arrival). When his first season ended, Ben Dayan had proven his worth to Colorado manager, Fernando Clavijo, and was signed to a three-year contract estimated at $120,000 per annum. During his time there, when Ben Dayan would score a goal for Colorado at INVESCO Field, he would generally run to his family in Colorado who would throw him the Israeli flag.

==== Return to Israel ====
Ben Dayan returned to Israel to play for Maccabi Netanya in August 2006. He stated that he asked to return due to the Second Lebanon War and wanted to be closer to his family. Following his return to Israeli soccer with Maccabi Netanya, it was noted by the media that his play had improved dramatically from the time he left for the MLS in 2005. When interviewed by reporters, Ben Dayan credited this improvement to the quicker pace and more physical game of the MLS, as well as its state of the art training facilities.

==== Move to Cyprus and back to Israel ====
In January 2012, Ben Dayan moved to Cyprus side AC Omonia until the end of the season, before moving back to Israel to play for Hapoel Acre. In the 2013-14 season Ben Dayan played for Bnei Sakhnin, the following season he signed a one-year contract with Maccabi Petah Tikva. In November 2015, Ben Dayan signed a two years contract with Maccabi Sha'arayim from Liga Alef (third tier), which meant that for first time in his career he won't be playing in a top flight league.

=== Personal life ===
Ben Dayan is Jewish. While playing for the Colorado Rapids, Ben Dayan was dismayed that he had to miss a league match due to its falling out on Yom Kippur.

After seven years of dating, Ben Dayan married Dana Farkash at the Royal Garden Hotel in Eilat, Israel in a Jewish ceremony. Among the guests were numerous Israeli celebrities and professional footballers.

== Honours ==
- Toto Cup (1):
  - 1998–99
- Israel State Cup (4):
  - 2001, 2002, 2010, 2011
- Israeli Premier League (1):
  - 2009–10
- Cypriot Cup (1):
  - 2012

== See also ==
- List of select Jewish football (association; soccer) players
