= Rasheed Alabi =

Nigerian footballer (born 1986)

Rashid Alabi
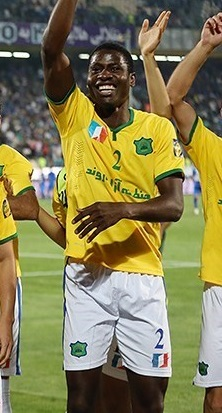

Personal information
- Full name: Rasheed Oladimeji Alabi Suaibu
- Date of birth: 9 January 1986 (age 40)
- Place of birth: Kaduna, Nigeria
- Height: 1.88 m (6 ft 2 in)
- Position: Centre back

Youth career
- 2000–2003: Delta United
- 2004–2005: Atsalenios
- 2005–2006: OFI
- 2007: University of Nigeria

Senior career*
Years	Team	Apps	(Gls)
2007–2008	Doxa Katokopias	30	(3)
2008–2014	AC Omonia	103	(8)
2014–2015	Leixões	11	(1)
2015–2016	Pafos	24	(0)
2016–2017	Sanat Naft Abadan	16	(0)
- * Club domestic league appearances and goals as of 03:57, 6 August 2016 (UTC)

Rasheed Oladimeji Alabi Suaibu (born 9 January 1986 in Kaduna) is a Nigerian footballer who last played for Iranian club Sanat Naft.

== Career ==
He also played for OFI and Doxa Katokopias. He scored his first goal for AC Omonia in the UEFA Cup against Manchester City.

== Honours ==
- AC Omonia
- Cypriot Championship: 2010
- Cypriot Cup: 2011, 2012
- Cyprus FA Shield: 2010, 2012
