= Freddy (Angolan footballer) =

Angolan footballer

Personal information
- Full name: Frederico Castro Roque Santos
- Date of birth: 14 August 1979 (age 47)
- Place of birth: Malanje, Angola
- Height: 1.75 m (5 ft 9 in)
- Position: Forward

Youth career
- 1992–1998: Estoril

Senior career*
Years	Team	Apps	(Gls)
1998–2001	Estoril	79	(21)
2001–2005	União Leiria	89	(6)
2005	Moreirense	10	(1)
2006	Al-Gharafa	?	(4)
2006	Aves	9	(0)
2007	Negeri Sembilan	9	
2007	Doxa	7	(3)
2008	Enosis Neon	26	(13)
2009–2011	AEL Limassol	68	(24)
2011–2013	Omonia	53	(23)
2013	1º Agosto		
2014	Caála	6	(1)
Total		347	(96)

International career
2004–2005	Angola	11	(1)
- * Club domestic league appearances and goals

Frederico Castro Roque dos Santos (born 14 August 1979), known as Freddy, is an Angolan retired footballer who played as a forward.

He spent most of his professional career in Portugal and Cyprus.

== Club career ==
Born in Malanje, Freddy spent nine seasons at G.D. Estoril Praia – youth years comprised – playing two seasons in the Portuguese third division and one in the second as a senior. In 2001–02 he made his Primeira Liga debut, being coached by a young José Mourinho and playing 22 matches (17 as a substitute) as the team qualified to the UEFA Intertoto Cup; during four years, he only started in 16 of the league appearances he made.

Freddy started 2005–06 with Moreirense F.C. in the second level, but transferred to Al-Gharafa Sports Club from Qatar in the next transfer window. He would also split the following campaign, between C.D. Aves (Portuguese top flight) and Malaysia's Negeri Sembilan FA, appearing in six AFC Cup games during his short spell with the latter and scoring three goals.

In summer 2007, Freddy moved countries again, signing with Doxa Katokopias FC in Cyprus. In January of the following year, he stayed in the country and joined Enosis Neon Paralimni FC.

Still in Cyprus, in January 2009 Freddy signed for AEL Limassol, scoring a combined 20 Cypriot First Division goals in his first two full seasons but seeing his team come out empty in silverware.

== International career ==
Freddy appeared for Angola during the 2006 FIFA World Cup qualification campaign, scoring his only international goal in a 1–0 home win against Rwanda, on 5 September 2004. The Palancas Negras eventually qualified for the final stages in Germany – a first-ever – but he was overlooked for the final squad of 23.

== Honours ==
Omonia

- Cypriot Cup: 2011–12
- Cypriot Super Cup: 2012
