= Danielson (footballer) =

Brazilian footballer (born 1981)

Personal information
- Full name: Danielson Ferreira Trindade
- Date of birth: 9 January 1981 (age 45)
- Place of birth: São Paulo, Brazil
- Height: 1.87 m (6 ft 2 in)
- Position: Centre-back

Senior career*
Years	Team	Apps	(Gls)
2002	Grêmio Inhumense		
2003	Gama		
2003–2008	Rio Ave	95	(1)
2008	Khimki	13	(0)
2009–2010	Paços Ferreira	40	(2)
2010–2012	Nacional	55	(3)
2012–2013	Omonia	22	(1)
2013–2014	Gil Vicente	26	(0)
2014–2016	Moreirense	54	(1)
2016–2017	Cova Piedade	21	(0)
2017–2018	Salgueiros	29	(2)
2018–2019	Rio Ave B	32	(1)
2019–2021	Berço	34	(1)
2021–2022	Maia Lidador	25	(3)
Total		446+	(15+)
- * Club domestic league appearances and goals

Danielson Ferreira Trindade (born 9 January 1981), known simply as Danielson, is a Brazilian former professional footballer who played as a central defender.

He amassed Primeira Liga totals of 216 games and six goals over ten seasons, in representation of Rio Ave, Paços de Ferreira, Nacional, Gil Vicente and Moreirense. He also played in Russia and Cyprus.

== Club career ==
Born in São Paulo, Danielson started his senior career with lowly Grêmio Esportivo Inhumense. In the middle of 2003 he moved to Portugal, spending the following five years with Rio Ave FC (the first three seasons in the Primeira Liga and the following two in the Segunda Liga, with promotion in 2008).

In 2008, Danielson signed with Russian Football Premier League side FC Khimki. During his stint in the country, he claimed to have been arrested twice.

Danielson returned to Portugal the following January transfer window, being loaned to F.C. Paços de Ferreira. Subsequently, he returned to his previous club, was released, and re-signed with Paços on a one-year contract.

Danielson joined another Portuguese team in June 2010, moving to Madeira's C.D. Nacional. After one year in the Cypriot First Division with AC Omonia, he spent the next three seasons also in the Portuguese top flight with Gil Vicente F.C. and Moreirense FC; in the 2014–15 campaign, he was one of only three players to appear in every minute in the league.

At the age of 35, Danielson signed with C.D. Cova da Piedade of the Portuguese second tier. Until his retirement, he competed in the country's lower leagues and amateur football.
