= Renato Margaça =

Cypriot footballer

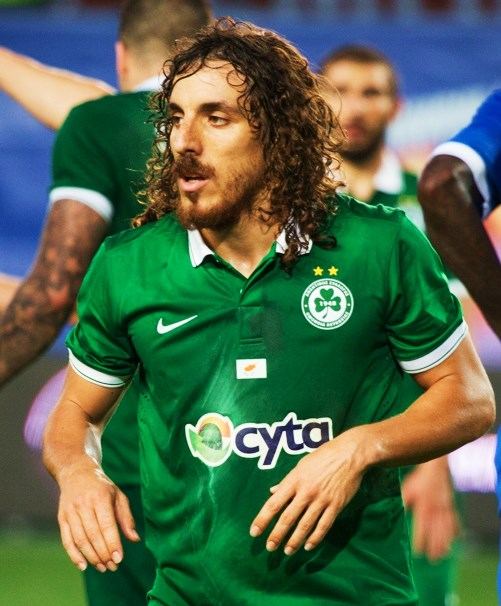
- Margaça in action for Omonia in 2014

Personal information
- Full name: Renato João Inácio Margaça
- Date of birth: 17 July 1985 (age 41)
- Place of birth: Covilhã, Portugal
- Height: 1.65 m (5 ft 5 in)
- Positions: Midfielder; left-back

Youth career
- 1994–2001: Torreense
- 2002–2004: Alverca

Senior career*
| Years | Team | Apps | (Gls) |
| 2004–2005 | Alverca | 6 | (0) |
| 2005 | Fátima | 6 | (0) |
| 2006–2007 | Torreense | 41 | (10) |
| 2007–2008 | Mafra | 36 | (4) |
| 2008–2010 | Doxa | 60 | (6) |
| 2010–2011 | AEK Larnaca | 31 | (0) |
| 2011–2018 | Omonia | 165 | (11) |
| 2018–2019 | Nea Salamina | 30 | (1) |
| 2019–2021 | Anorthosis | 37 | (1) |
| 2021–2023 | Nea Salamina | 37 | (0) |
| Total | | 479 | (33) |

International career
| 2002–2003 | Portugal U18 | 7 | (0) |
| 2003–2004 | Portugal U19 | 4 | (0) |
| 2017–2019 | Cyprus | 21 | (0) |
- * Club domestic league appearances and goals

Renato João Inácio Margaça (Greek: Ρενάτο Μαργκάσα; born 17 July 1985) is a former professional footballer. Mainly a midfielder, he could also operate as a left-back. Born in Portugal, he represented the Cyprus national team.

== Club career ==
Born in Covilhã, Margaça's input at the professional level in his country consisted of six Segunda Liga games with F.C. Alverca in 2004–05. At the end of the season, the club folded and he went on to resume his career in the lower leagues.

In the summer of 2008, Margaça moved to the Cypriot First Division where he remained more than one decade. He started out at Doxa Katokopias FC, signing with AEK Larnaca FC two years later.

On 8 July 2017, six years after arriving there, the 32-year-old Margaça renewed his contract with AC Omonia until June 2020.

== International career ==
At youth level, Margaça earned 11 caps for Portugal. On 17 March 2017, after being awarded the country's citizenship, he was called up to the Cyprus national team, making his debut five days later in a 3–1 friendly win over Kazakhstan where he was involved in two of the goals.

== Career statistics ==
As of 9 May 2021

| Club | Season | League | | | Cup | | Other | | Total | |
| Club | Season | Division | Apps | Goals | Apps | Goals | Apps | Goals | Apps | Goals |
|---|---|---|---|---|---|---|---|---|---|---|
| Alverca | 2004–05 | Segunda Liga | 6 | 0 | 1 | 0 | — | | 7 | 0 |
| Torreense | 2005–06 | Segunda Divisão | 18 | 6 | 0 | 0 | — | | 18 | 6 |
| Fátima | 2005–06 | Segunda Divisão | 6 | 0 | 0 | 0 | — | | 6 | 0 |
| Torreense | 2006–07 | Segunda Divisão | 23 | 4 | 1 | 1 | — | | 24 | 5 |
| Mafra | 2007–08 | Segunda Divisão | 36 | 4 | 1 | 0 | — | | 37 | 4 |
| Doxa | 2008–09 | Cypriot First Division | 32 | 3 | | | — | | 32 | 3 |
| Doxa | 2009–10 | Cypriot First Division | 28 | 3 | | | — | | 28 | 3 |
| Doxa | Total | | 60 | 6 | | | — | | 60 | 6 |
| AEK Larnaca | 2010–11 | Cypriot First Division | 31 | 0 | 0 | 0 | — | | 31 | 0 |
| Omonia | 2011–12 | Cypriot First Division | 19 | 1 | 5 | 1 | 3 (Note: Appearances in UEFA Europa League) | 0 | 27 | 2 |
| Omonia | 2012–13 | Cypriot First Division | 17 | 1 | 3 | 0 | 2 | 0 | 22 | 1 |
| Omonia | 2013–14 | Cypriot First Division | 29 | 1 | 3 | 0 | 1 | 0 | 33 | 1 |
| Omonia | 2014–15 | Cypriot First Division | 27 | 0 | 4 | 0 | 2 | 0 | 33 | 0 |
| Omonia | 2015–16 | Cypriot First Division | 18 | 1 | 4 | 2 | 6 | 0 | 28 | 3 |
| Omonia | 2016–17 | Cypriot First Division | 33 | 4 | 4 | 0 | — | | 37 | 4 |
| Omonia | 2017–18 | Cypriot First Division | 22 | 3 | 2 | 0 | — | | 24 | 3 |
| Omonia | Total | | 165 | 11 | 25 | 3 | 14 | 0 | 204 | 14 |
| Nea Salamina | 2018–19 | Cypriot First Division | 30 | 1 | 2 | 0 | — | | 32 | 1 |
| Anorthosis | 2019–20 | Cypriot First Division | 11 | 0 | 1 | 0 | — | | 12 | 0 |
| Anorthosis | 2020–21 | Cypriot First Division | 26 | 1 | 5 | 0 | 1 | 0 | 32 | 1 |
| Anorthosis | Total | | 37 | 1 | 6 | 0 | 1 | 0 | 44 | 1 |
| Career total | | | 412 | 33 | 36 | 4 | 15 | 0 | 432 | 37 |

== Honours ==
Omonia

- Cypriot Cup: 2011–12
- Cypriot Super Cup: 2012

Anorthosis

- Cypriot Cup: 2020–21
