= Vero Salatić =

Bosnian-born Swiss footballer (born 1985)

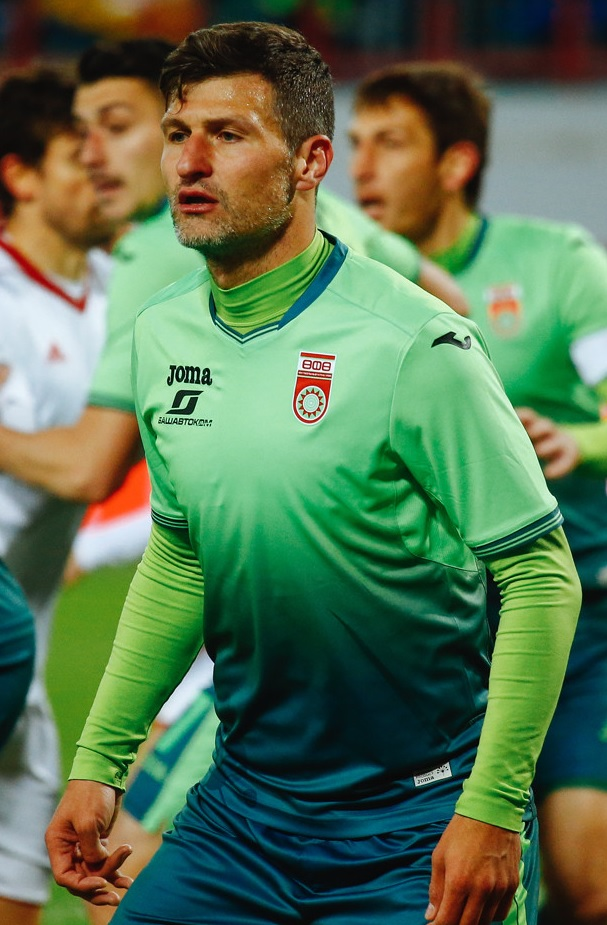
- Salatić with Ufa in 2018

Personal information
- Full name: Veroljub Salatić
- Date of birth: 14 November 1985 (age 41)
- Place of birth: Zvornik, SFR Yugoslavia
- Height: 1.85 m (6 ft 1 in)
- Position: Defensive midfielder

Youth career
- 1992–1994: SC Zug
- 1994–2000: Zug 94
- 2000–2003: Grasshopper

Senior career*
Years	Team	Apps	(Gls)
2003–2011	Grasshopper	229	(12)
2011–2012	AC Omonia	25	(1)
2012–2015	Grasshopper	72	(5)
2015–2017	Sion	77	(4)
2017–2019	Ufa	30	(0)
2019–2020	Grasshopper	33	(2)

International career
2004–2006	Switzerland U-21	25	(2)

Managerial career
- 2020–2021: Grasshopper U21 (assistant)
- 2021–2022: Rapperswil-Jona II
- * Club domestic league appearances and goals

Veroljub "Vero" Salatić (Serbian Cyrillic: Верољуб Веро Салатић; born 14 November 1985) is a Bosnian-born Swiss football coach and a former player who played as a central midfielder.

== Career ==
A Bosnian Serb, Salatić moved to Switzerland as a child and started training with local team SC Zug in 1992, aged 7. In 2000, he moved on to Grasshopper Club Zürich. In the 2003–04 season he broke into the first team. He is used mostly as a holding midfielder or as a central defender.

=== AC Omonia ===
In July 2011, he signed a contract with Cypriot side AC Omonia.

=== Ufa ===
On 31 August 2017, Salatić signed for Russian Premier League side FC Ufa. He left Ufa on 3 June 2019 upon the expiration of his contract.

=== Return to Grasshoppers ===
On 17 June 2019, he returned to Grasshoppers for the second time, signing a 2-year contract. The contract was terminated by the club on 11 August 2020, and he retired from playing.

== International career ==
Salatić has represented Switzerland at various levels including at the U-19 European Championship in 2004 in Switzerland. In 2005, he starred at the FIFA U-20 World Cup. The side were managed by Pierre-André Schürmann. Salatić starred alongside a Swiss team including Blerim Džemaili, Tranquillo Barnetta and Valon Behrami.

His success has not gone unnoticed by the Football Association of Serbia who have twice attempted to call him up, both times he refused saying he wished to play for Switzerland. He played his last match for the U21 side against England in 2006 and since then neither Köbi Kuhn nor Ottmar Hitzfeld have shown any interest in calling him up.

As an ethnic Serb from Bosnia, he first expressed his desire to play for Serbia but he was never called, so he later stated that he would like to play for national team of Bosnia and Herzegovina.

== Honours ==
=== Club ===
Grasshopper Zurich

- Swiss Cup: 2012–13

AC Omonia

- Cypriot Cup: 2011-12

FC Sion

- Swiss Cup: 2014-15
- Swiss Super League Team of the Year: 2013–14

== Career statistics ==
=== Club ===
As of 13 May 2018

Club	Season	League			Cup		Continental		Other		Total	
Club	Season	Division	Apps	Goals	Apps	Goals	Apps	Goals	Apps	Goals	Apps	Goals
Grasshoppers	2003–04	Swiss Super League	10	0	0	0	1	0	–		11	0
Grasshoppers	2004–05	Swiss Super League	32	0	1	0	–		–		33	0
Grasshoppers	2005–06	Swiss Super League	30	1	2	2	7	2	–		39	5
Grasshoppers	2006–07	Swiss Super League	27	2	2	0	11	1	–		40	3
Grasshoppers	2007–08	Swiss Super League	33	2	3	0	–		–		36	2
Grasshoppers	2008–09	Swiss Super League	32	3	4	0	5	1	–		41	4
Grasshoppers	2009–10	Swiss Super League	34	3	2	0	–		–		36	3
Grasshoppers	2010–11	Swiss Super League	31	1	3	1	2	1	–		36	3
Omonia	2011–12	Cypriot First Division	25	1	7	2	4	0	1 (Note: One appearance in the Cypriot Super Cup)	0	37	3
Grasshoppers	2012–13	Swiss Super League	31	3	5	0	–		–		36	3
Grasshoppers	2013–14	Swiss Super League	31	1	2	0	4	0	–		37	1
Grasshoppers	2014–15	Swiss Super League	10	1	0	0	3	0	–		13	1
Grasshoppers	Total (2 spells)		301	17	24	3	33	5	0	0	358	25
Sion	2014–15	Swiss Super League	16	0	3	0	–		–		19	0
Sion	2015–16	Swiss Super League	32	3	3	0	8	1	–		43	4
Sion	2016–17	Swiss Super League	29	1	4	1	–		–		33	2
Sion	Total		77	4	10	1	8	1	0	0	95	6
Ufa	2017–18	Russian Premier League	18	0	1	0	–		–		19	0
Career total			421	22	42	6	45	6	1	0	509	34
