= Noel Kaseke =

Zimbabwean footballer (born 1980)

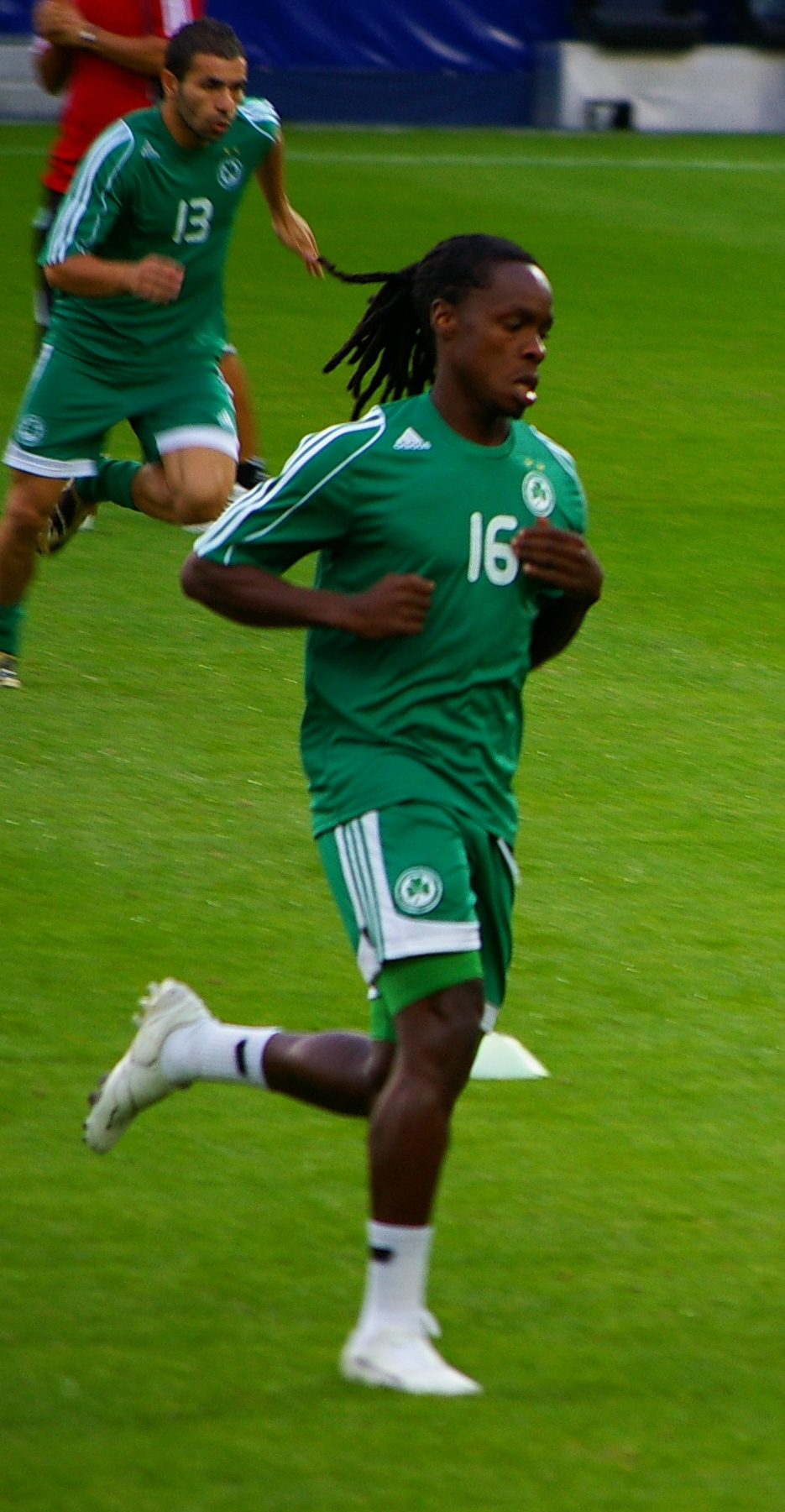
- Kaseke playing for AC Omonia

Personal information
- Date of birth: 24 December 1980 (age 45)
- Place of birth: Bulawayo, Zimbabwe
- Height: 1.78 m (5 ft 10 in)
- Position: Defensive midfielder

Senior career*
Years	Team	Apps	(Gls)
1999–2002	Highlanders FC	101	(16)
2002–2003	KF Erzeni Shijak	22	(4)
2003	Highlanders FC	4	(0)
2003–2004	Mohun Bagan AC	12	(5)
2004–2007	Enosis Neon Paralimni	73	(4)
2007–2012	AC Omonia	118	(4)
2012–2013	Alki Larnaca	15	(0)
2013	Al-Shaab	11	(1)
2014–2016	Dibba Al-Hisn		
2016–2018	Masfut		

International career^{‡}
2007–	Zimbabwe	7	(0)
- * Club domestic league appearances and goals as of 3 June 2013 ‡ National team caps and goals as of 7 April 2013

Noel Kaseke (born 24 December 1980) is a retired Zimbabwean footballer who played primarily as a defensive midfielder.

== Early life ==
Kaseke grew up in Dete and attended secondary school at Marist Brothers Dete.

== Playing career ==
Kaseke started his senior footballing career in the Highlanders FC in 1999. Three years later he moved for the first time to Europe, and joined the KF Erzeni Shijak in Albania. Then he returned to Highlanders FC for six months. He also played in Mohun Bagan AC in India. His next club was Enosis Neon Paralimni where he stayed for three years. In June 2007 he signed a contract with AC Omonia. He plays best as a defensive midfielder but he also plays well as a right back. In May 2012 his contract with AC Omonia end, so Kaseke was free to find his new team. During this five years with AC Omonia Kaseke won 5 titles.

== Honours ==
Omonia

- Cypriot Championship: 2010
- Cypriot Cup: 2011, 2012
- Cyprus FA Shield: 2010
