= Mércio (footballer) =

Brazilian footballer

Personal information
- Full name: Mércio José Santos da Silva
- Date of birth: May 26, 1980 (age 46)
- Place of birth: Recife, Brazil
- Height: 1.76 m (5 ft 9 in)
- Position: Defensive midfielder

Team information
- Current team: Famalicão
- Number: 7

Senior career*
Years	Team	Apps	(Gls)
2000–2001	Centro Limoeirense		
2001–2003	Rio Ave	54	(5)
2003–2008	Desportivo das Aves	112	(8)
2008–2010	Trofense	13	(0)
2010–2012	Olympiakos Nicosia	63	(4)
2013	AEK Larnaca	13	(0)
2013–	Famalicão	119	(19)
- * Club domestic league appearances and goals as of 15 March 2017

Mércio José Santos da Silva or simply Mércio (born 26 May 1980) is a Brazilian football player who plays for Famalicão.
