= Luciano Bebê =

Brazilian footballer (born 1981)

Personal information
- Full name: Luciano Lima da Silva
- Date of birth: 11 March 1981 (age 45)
- Place of birth: Riachão do Jacuípe, Brazil
- Height: 1.63 m (5 ft 4 in)
- Position: Midfielder

Senior career*
Years	Team	Apps	(Gls)
2005–2007	Noroeste		
2007	Santo André	29	(3)
2008	Noroeste	12	(0)
2009	Criciúma	28	(2)
2009	CRB	5	(2)
2010	São Bernardo	19	(3)
2010–2011	→ Estoril (loan)	28	(1)
2011–2015	AEL Limassol	100	(17)
2015–2016	Omonoia	28	(2)
2016–2017	Nea Salamis	26	(0)
2018–2020	MEAP Nisou	23	(3)
- * Club domestic league appearances and goals as of 17:56, 31 May 2019 (UTC)

Luciano Lima da Silva (born 11 March 1981), commonly known as Luciano Bebê is a Brazilian retired footballer.

== AEL Limassol ==
When he moved to the Cypriot First Division with AEL Limassol, he made an instant impact. Coupled with excellent performances from both Bebe and the rest of the team, including Matías Omar Degra they went on to win the league for the first time since 1968. It was Bebe who scored the Title winning goal in a match against Anorthosis Famagusta FC to give the Lions a title for the first time in over 20 years.

== Honours ==
- AEL Limassol
  - Cypriot First Division: 2011-12
