= Christos Karipidis =

Greek footballer

Personal information
- Date of birth: 2 December 1982 (age 43)
- Place of birth: Thessaloniki, Greece
- Height: 1.83 m (6 ft 0 in)
- Positions: Centre back; defensive midfielder

Youth career
- 1999–2001: PAOK

Senior career*
Years	Team	Apps	(Gls)
2001–2006	PAOK	63	(2)
2001–2002	→ Kavala (loan)	40	(0)
2002–2003	→ Kerkyra (loan)	25	(2)
2006–2009	Heart of Midlothian	62	(3)
2009–2012	Omonia	72	(2)
2012–2013	APOEL	18	(0)
2013–2014	Apollon Limassol	26	(4)
2014–2016	Skoda Xanthi	38	(1)
2016–2018	Platanias	43	(2)
2018–2019	Lamia	10	(0)
Total		397	(16)

International career^{‡}
2004	Greece Olympic	0	(0)

Managerial career
- 2019–2024: PAOK (Team Manager)
- 2024–: PAOK (Technical director)
- * Club domestic league appearances and goals as of 6 May 2019 ‡ National team caps and goals as of 7 January 2009

Christos Karipidis (Greek: Χρήστος Καρυπίδης; born 2 December 1982) is a Greek former professional footballer who played as a centre back. Managerial career from PAOK (Technical director)

== Club career ==
=== Early Career (PAOK, Kerkyra and Kavala) ===
Karipidis started his career in U20 PAOK in 2000 to be promoted the next season in the first team. PAOK has given him to Kavala (2001–2002) and to Kerkyra (2002–2003). He returned to PAOK, where he stayed until 2006 (69 appearances, 3 goals in all competitions) when he made the big step to play abroad accepting the proposal of Hearts.

=== Hearts ===
He joined Hearts from PAOK on 3 August 2006 for a fee of around £200,000. Karipidis made his Hearts debut against AEK Athens in a third-round UEFA Champions League qualifier at Murrayfield on 9 August 2006 in a defensive midfield role, Hearts lost the game 2–1.

In August 2008 Karipidis looked set for a return to his former club PAOK following an indifferent start to his Hearts career and the birth of his daughter. Hearts negotiated a fee in the region of £200,000 as they looked to recoup the fee they paid to sign him from the Greek club 2 years earlier and he was offered a four-year deal by PAOK. However, newly appointed manager Csaba László convinced Karipidis to stay and decided to use him as a holding midfielder, an idea which was initially met with a negative reaction by Hearts fans. Karipidis himself insisted he was happy to play anywhere László decided. Despite having played most of his career as either a central defender or occasionally a right-back Karipidis performed well in his new role, prompting László to say "Karipidis, at the moment, is the discovery of the year in the number six position."

In February 2009, captain Christophe Berra signed for Wolves and Karipidis was made Hearts' vice-captain after teammate Robbie Neilson was given the captaincy.

On 27 April 2009 Hearts announced that Karipidis had a pre-contract agreement with Omonia Nicosia which would see him join the Cypriot side on a three-year deal at the end of the season. He stated that although he had enjoyed his time in Scotland, the move was motivated by his desire to be closer to his home and relatives in Greece. His final appearance at Tynecastle came in a 3–0 victory over Dundee United which confirmed Hearts' place in the Europa League for the following season and third place in the SPL. He was replaced by Jason Thomson in the closing stages of the match and received a standing ovation from the Hearts fans.

=== Cyprus (Omonia / APOEL / Apollon) ===
Omonia announced the signing of Karipidis on 1 June 2009. His first season wasn't good enough with Christos having problems to settle, but he had a solid second season and he became the defensive leader of the team. After the end of the season he was named new season's vice captain. On 22 August 2012, his contract at Omonia terminated by mutual consent.

On 26 August 2012, Karipidis signed a two-year contract with APOEL. At the end of the season, he became a champion after helping APOEL to win the 2012–13 Cypriot First Division. On 10 July 2013, his contract with APOEL was mutually terminated.

On 11 July 2013, Karipidis signed a one-year contract with the option of a further season with Apollon Limassol.

=== Rerurn to Greece ===
After five years playing among the top clubs in Cyprus, Karipidis returned to Greece signing a two years' contract with Skoda Xanthi. After two years he mutually settled his contract with the club.

On 4 June 2016, he signed a year contract with Platanias for an undisclosed fee.

== International career ==
Karipidis was a part of the Greece football squad at the 2004 Summer Olympics, but he did not play a single minute in the competition.

Karipidis had a good start with the 2008-09 season former Hearts player and current technical director of the Hellenic Football Federation, when Takis Fyssas announced that Karipidis was in the plans of the Greece national team.

== Personal life ==
He hails from Anagennisi, Serres.

== Honours ==
Omonia

- Cypriot First Division: 1

2009–10

- Cypriot Cup: 2

2010–11, 2011–12

- LTV Super Cup: 1

2010

APOEL

- Cypriot First Division: 1

2012–13
