= André Alves =

Brazilian footballer (born 1983)

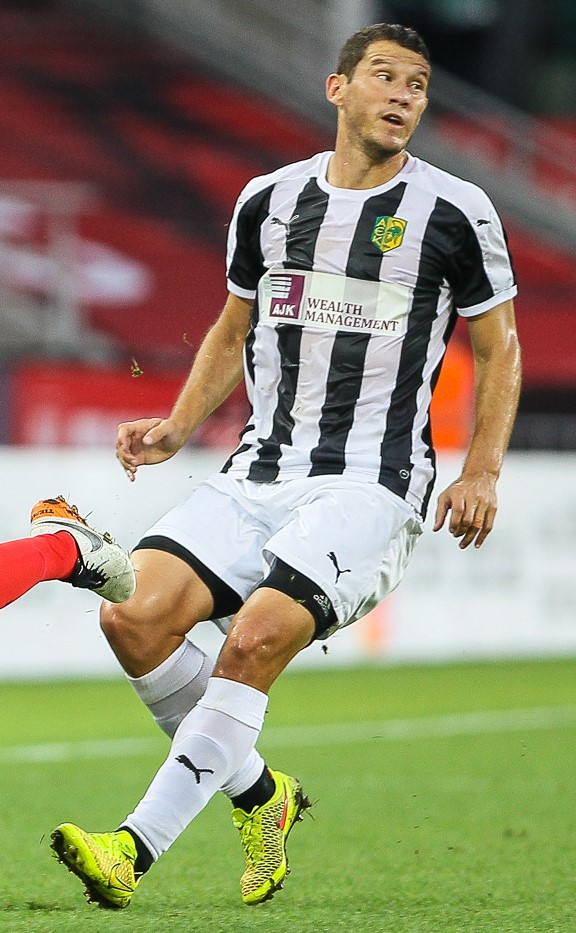
- Alves with AEK Larnaca in 2016

Personal information
- Full name: André Alves dos Santos
- Date of birth: 15 October 1983 (age 43)
- Place of birth: Dourados, Brazil
- Height: 1.80 m (5 ft 11 in)
- Position: Striker

Youth career
- 2002–2004: União Barbarense
- 2004–2005: ECUS

Senior career*
Years	Team	Apps	(Gls)
2005	Budapest Honvéd	14	(6)
2005–2008	Kaposvár	73	(26)
2008	→ Luch-Energia Vladivostok (loan)	13	(1)
2009–2012	Videoton	91	(55)
2012–2013	Omonia	41	(20)
2013–2014	Dubai CSC	1	(0)
2014–2015	Panetolikos	27	(5)
2015–2017	AEK Larnaca	51	(25)
2017–2018	Anorthosis Famagusta	32	(7)
2018	Mezőkövesd	3	(0)
Total		334	(141)
- * Club domestic league appearances and goals

André Alves dos Santos (born 15 October 1983) is a Brazilian former professional footballer who played as a striker.

== Club career ==
In 2005 Alves joined Budapest Honvéd where he scored 6 goals in 14 appearances in six months. In summer 2005 he was transferred to Kaposvári Rákóczi. In 2 1/2 seasons he played 73 times and scored 23 goals. He was loaned out to Russian side Luch-Energia Vladivostok in which he scored a goal in 13 appearances. In summer 2009 he joined Videoton FC. In the 2010–11 season he became top goalscorer. In a total, he played 91 times with Videoton FC and he scored 55 goals.

On 30 January 2012, he moved to Cyprus side Omonia. He scored his first goal at his debut in cup game against Nea Salamina.

On 30 May 2014, he signed a one-year contract with Panetolikos.

In the summer of 2015, he returned to Cyprus for AEK Larnaca.

== Honours ==
Videoton

- Monicomp Liga: 2010–11

Omonia

- Cypriot Cup: 2012
- Cypriot Super Cup: 2012

Individual

- Monicomp Liga top goalscorer: 2010–11
- HLSZ Player of the Season (Albert Flórián Award): 2010–11
- Nemzeti Sport Team of the Season: 2009–10, 2010–11 Autumn Season, 2010–11
- Cyta Championship top goalscorer: 2015–16
