= Cédric Moukouri =

French footballer (born 1979)

Personal information
- Full name: Cédric Moukouri Mambingo
- Date of birth: 29 October 1979 (age 47)
- Place of birth: Gonesse, France
- Height: 1.82 m (5 ft 11 1/2 in)
- Position: Striker

Team information
- Current team: Saint-Pauloise

Senior career*
Years	Team	Apps	(Gls)
2001	Villemomble Sports		
2001–2004	RC Strasbourg (B team)		
2002–2004	RC Strasbourg	12	(0)
2004–2006	AS Cherbourg		
2006–2008	C.S. Marítimo	13	(1)
2008	C.D. Trofense (loan)	10	(2)
2008–2009	FC Etzella Ettelbruck		
2009–2010	JA Drancy		
2010–2011	UJA Alfortville	16	(2)
2011–2012	Enosis Neon Paralimni	21	(1)
2012–	Saint-Pauloise		
- * Club domestic league appearances and goals as of 25 April 2012 (UTC)

Cédric Moukouri Mambingo (born 29 October 1979), known as Cédric Moukouri, is a French football player who plays in Réunion for Saint-Pauloise.

He played for Portuguese outfit Trofense after signing from Marítimo in 2007 and formerly playing for French club RC Strasbourg. He was a key player for the Ligue 1 outfit but the club could not avoid relegation and in the summer, Cedric left for Marítimo.
