= Carlos García (footballer, born 1979) =

Uruguayan footballer

Personal information
- Full name: Carlos Andrés García Cuña
- Date of birth: November 6, 1979 (age 46)
- Place of birth: Montevideo, Uruguay
- Height: 1.92 m (6 ft 3 1/2 in)
- Position: Centre back

Senior career*
Years	Team	Apps	(Gls)
2000–2004	Liverpool Montevideo	40	(4)
2004–2005	Unione Venezia	22	(0)
2005–2006	Liverpool Montevideo	14	(1)
2006	Peñarol	7	(0)
2007	Vecindario	6	(0)
2007–2008	Liverpool Montevideo	18	(0)
2008–2009	Alki Larnaca	18	(0)
2009–2011	APEP	44	(3)
2011–2012	Nea Salamina	30	(1)
2012	Racing Club Montevideo	8	(1)
2013–2014	Guangdong Sunray Cave	55	(1)
2015	Progreso	8	(0)

International career
2005	Uruguay	1	(0)
- * Club domestic league appearances and goals as of 12 July 2015

Carlos Andrés García Cuña (Latin American Spanish: [ˈkaɾlos anˈdɾes ɣaɾˈsi.a]; (Note: In isolation, García is pronounced [ɡaɾˈsi.a].) born 6 November 1979 in Montevideo) is a retired Uruguayan footballer who was central defender.
