= 2011–12 Cypriot Cup =

Tournament details
- Country: Cyprus
- Dates: 30 November 2011 – 16 May 2012
- Teams: 28

Final positions
- Champions: Omonia (14th title)
- Runners-up: AEL Limassol

The 2011–12 Cypriot Cup was the 70th edition of the Cypriot Cup. A total of 28 clubs entered the competition. It began on 30 November 2011 with the first round and concluded on 16 May 2012 with the final which was held at GSP Stadium. Omonia won their 14th Cypriot Cup trophy after beating AEL 1–0 in the final.

== Format ==
In the 2011–12 Cypriot Cup, participated all the teams of the Cypriot First Division and the Cypriot Second Division. Teams from the two lower divisions (Third and Fourth) competed in a separate cup competition.

The competition consisted of five rounds. In the first round each tie was played as a single leg and was held at the home ground of one of the two teams, according to the draw results. Each tie winner was qualifying to the next round. If a match was drawn, extra time was following. If extra time was drawn, there was a replay at the ground of the team who were away for the first game. If the rematch was also drawn, then extra time was following and if the match remained drawn after extra time the winner was decided by penalty shoot-out.

The next three rounds were played in a two-legged format, each team playing a home and an away match against their opponent. The team which scored more goals on aggregate, was qualifying to the next round. If the two teams scored the same number of goals on aggregate, then the team which scored more goals away from home was advancing to the next round.

If both teams had scored the same number of home and away goals, then extra time was following after the end of the second leg match. If during the extra thirty minutes both teams had managed to score, but they had scored the same number of goals, then the team who scored the away goals was advancing to the next round (i.e. the team which was playing away). If there weren't scored any goals during extra time, the qualifying team was determined by penalty shoot-out.

The final was a single match.

The cup winner secured a place for the third qualifying round of the 2012–13 UEFA Europa League.

== Bracket ==
Second Round
1	EN Parekklisias	0	0	0
16	AEK Larnaca	5	4	9
8	Alki Larnaca	2	6	8
9	AEP Paphos	0	0	0
5	APOEL	0	0	0
12	AEL Limassol	1	0	1
4	APOP Kinyras	2	0	2
13	Anorthosis	3	3	6
6	Omonia	2	8	10
11	Nea Salamis	0	1	1
3	Apollon Limassol	2	1	3
14	Ermis Aradippou (a.e.t.)	1	3	4
7	Olympiakos Nicosia	3	2	5
10	Omonia Aradippou	2	0	2
2	Ethnikos Achna	2	0	2
15	Aris Limassol	0	0	0

Quarter-finals
AEK Larnaca (a.e.t.) (a)	1	1	2
Alki Larnaca	0	2	2
AEL Limassol (a)	1	1	2
Anorthosis	0	2	2
Omonia	6	3	9
Ermis Aradippou	0	0	0
Olympiakos Nicosia	0	0	0
Ethnikos Achna	1	0	1

Semi-finals
AEK Larnaca	0	0	0
AEL Limassol	1	0	1
Omonia	3	0	3
Ethnikos Achna	0	1	1

Final
AEL Limassol	0
Omonia	1

== First round ==
The draw was made on 4 November 2011, with ties played on 30 November 2011, 7 December 2011 and 11 January 2012.

30 November 2011	Alki Larnaca (A)	4−1	Onisilos Sotira (B)	GSZ Stadium, Larnaca
14:00 EET	Charalambous 33'; Solari 43'; Bashov 54'; Conde 75'		Traore 87'	Attendance: 100; Referee: Loizos Panayiotou

30 November 2011	AEP Paphos (B)	3−3 (a.e.t.) (5−4 p)	Enosis Neon Paralimni (A)	Pafiako Stadium, Paphos
14:00 EET	Vargas 74'; Saidhodzha 92', 101'		Moukouri 51'; Semedo 94'; De Wulf 115'	Attendance: 350; Referee: Charalambos Skapoullis
	Penalties
	Cascavel (penalty scored); Saidhodzha (penalty scored); Kakoyiannis (penalty scored); Voskaridis (penalty scored); Garpozis (penalty scored)		(penalty scored) Spyrou; (penalty scored) De Wulf; (penalty missed) Sidnei; (penalty scored) Faria; (penalty scored) Petkov

30 November 2011	APEP (B)	1−3	Ermis Aradippou (A)	Kyperounda Stadium, Kyperounta
14:00 EET	Rodrigues 26' (pen.)		Saavedra 71'; Charalambous 75'; González 87'	Referee: Marios Ioannou

30 November 2011	Othellos Athienou (B)	0−3	Aris Limassol (A)	Othellos Athienou, Athienou
14:00 EET			Sosin 5'; Comboio 15'; Gelson 33'	Referee: Costas Nicolaou

30 November 2011	Atromitos Yeroskipou (B)	1−1 (a.e.t.) (1−3 p)	APOP Kinyras (B)	Geroskipou Stadium, Geroskipou
14:00 EET	Makris 43'		Constantinou 69'	Attendance: 200; Referee: Andreas Orthodoxou
	Penalties
	Kurdiyev (penalty missed); Savva (penalty missed); Makris (penalty scored); Ioannou (penalty missed)		(penalty scored) Catchana; (penalty scored) Loizou; (penalty scored) Tarumbwa

30 November 2011	AEL Limassol (A)	2−0	Ethnikos Assia F.C. (B)	Tsirion Stadium, Limassol
16:00 EET	Vouho 54'; Silas 75'			Attendance: 1,057; Referee: Iakovos Tokkaris

7 December 2011	Ayia Napa F.C. (B)	2−4	Nea Salamis (A)	Ayia Napa Stadium, Ayia Napa
14:00 EET	Moushis 16'; Pierettis 30'		García 43'; Dickson 62', 90'; Roque 83'	Attendance: 250; Referee: Demetris Constantinou

7 December 2011	EN Parekklisias (B)	3−1	Anagennisi Deryneia (A)	Parekklisia Stadium, Parekklisia
14:00 EET	Pantos 55', 63'; Demetriou 89'		Šimunović 41'	Referee: Marios Nicolaou

7 December 2011	Anorthosis (A)	6−0	PAEEK (B)	Antonis Papadopoulos, Larnaca
16:00 EET	Roncatto 12', 62'; Laban 19'; M.Konstantinou 40'; Theodorou 49'; Marquinhos 60'			Attendance: 900; Referee: Loukas Soteriou

7 December 2011	Olympiakos Nicosia (A)	3−2	Doxa Katokopia (B)	GSP Stadium, Nicosia
18:00 EET	Caiado 47', 54'; Sousa 84'		Bonifácio 39'; Pârvu 43'	Attendance: 98; Referee: Andreas Orthodoxou

11 January 2012	Chalkanoras Idaliou (B)	0−1	AEK Larnaca (A)	Demetris Chamatsos, Dali
14:00 EET			van Dijk 74' (pen.)	Attendance: 150; Referee: Thomas Mouskos

11 January 2012	APOEL (A)	9−1	Akritas Chlorakas (B)	GSP Stadium, Nicosia
18:00 EET	Manduca 7', 14'; Adorno 19', 71', 90'; Morais 57', 70'; Marcinho 64'; Boaventura 82'		Forbes 89'	Attendance: 1,837; Referee: Demetris Chrysostomou

== Second round ==
The first legs played on 25 January, 1 and 8 February 2012. The second legs played on 1, 8, 15, 23 February and 7 March 2012.

The following four teams advanced directly to second round, meeting the twelve winners of first round ties:

- Omonia (2010–11 Cypriot Cup winner)
- Apollon Limassol (2010–11 Cypriot Cup finalist)
- Ethnikos Achna (2010–11 Cypriot First Division Fair Play winner)
- Omonia Aradippou (2010–11 Cypriot Second Division Fair Play winner)

Team 1	Agg.	Team 2	1st leg	2nd leg
Olympiakos Nicosia	5–2	Omonia Aradippou	3–2	2–0
APOP Kinyras	2–6	Anorthosis	2–3	0–3
Apollon Limassol	3–4	Ermis Aradippou	2–1	1–3 (a.e.t.)
Alki Larnaca	8–0	AEP Paphos	2–0	6–0
EN Parekklisias	0–9	AEK Larnaca	0–5	0–4
Ethnikos Achna	2–0	Aris Limassol	2–0	0–0
Omonia	10–1	Nea Salamis	2–0	8–1
APOEL	0–1	AEL Limassol	0–1	0–0

== Quarter-finals ==
The first legs played on 14 and 21 March 2012. The second legs played on 21 and 28 March 2012.

Team 1	Agg.	Team 2	1st leg	2nd leg
Omonia	9–0	Ermis Aradippou	6–0	3–0
AEL Limassol	2–2 (a)	Anorthosis	1–0	1–2
AEK Larnaca	2–2 (a)	Alki Larnaca	1–0	1–2 (a.e.t.)
Olympiakos Nicosia	0–1	Ethnikos Achna	0–1	0–0

== Semi-finals ==
The first legs played on 11 April 2012. The second legs played on 2 May 2012.

Team 1	Agg.	Team 2	1st leg	2nd leg
Omonia	3−1	Ethnikos Achna	3−0	0−1
AEK Larnaca	0−1	AEL Limassol	0−1	0−0

== Final ==
16 May 2012
19:00 EEST

AEL Limassol	0−1	Omonia
Ouon (red card) 30'	Report	Alves 16'

GSP Stadium, Nicosia
Attendance: 18,407
Referee: (Germany) Felix Brych

AEL Limassol	Omonia

Cypriot Cup 2011-12 Winners
Omonia
14th Title

== Sources ==
- Official website
- "2011/12 Cyprus Cup". Rec.Sport.Soccer Statistics Foundation. 14 January 2016.
- Papamoiseos, Stelios (2013). Από την ενοποίηση... στα αστέρια [From unification... to the stars] (in Greek). Nicosia: The writer. pp. 162–163.

== See also ==
- Cypriot Cup
- 2011–12 Cypriot First Division
- 2011–12 Cypriot Second Division
