= 2008–09 AS Roma season =

Roma
2008–09 season
- President: Rosella Sensi
- Manager: Luciano Spalletti
- Stadium: Stadio Olimpico
- Serie A: 6th
- Supercoppa Italiana: Runners-up
- Coppa Italia: Quarter-finals
- UEFA Champions League: Round of 16
- Top goalscorer: League: Francesco Totti (13); All: Mirko Vučinić (17)
- Highest home attendance: 62,383 vs Arsenal (11 March 2009, Champions League)
- Lowest home attendance: 14,944 vs Bologna (17 December 2008, Coppa Italia)
- Average home league attendance: 39,396
Home colours	Away colours	Third colours

The 2008–09 season was Associazione Sportiva Roma's 76th season in Serie A. The club competed in four competitions; domestically, Roma finished a disappointing 6th, after three consecutive second-place finishes. They began the season by losing the Supercoppa Italiana to Inter, who also eliminated Roma in the quarter-finals of the Coppa Italia.

Having finished 2nd the previous season, Roma qualified automatically to the group stage of the 2008–09 UEFA Champions League. Roma managed to finish top of their group, but were eliminated in the round of 16 by English club Arsenal in a penalty shoot-out.

== Club ==
=== Coaching staff ===
Position	Staff
Head Coach	(Italy) Luciano Spalletti
Assistant Coach	(Italy) Marco Domenichini
Goalkeeping Coach	(Italy) Adriano Bonaiuti
Physical fitness coach	(Italy) Mario Brozzi

Last updated: 3 August 2008
Source: A.S. Roma

== Players ==
=== Squad information ===
Last updated on 31 May 2009
Appearances include league matches only

No.	Name	Nat	Position(s)	Date of birth (Age at end of season)	Signed from	Signed in	Apps.	Goals
Goalkeepers
25	Artur	(Brazil)	GK	25 January 1981 (aged 28)	(Italy) Siena	2008	11	0
27	Júlio Sérgio	(Brazil)	GK	8 November 1978 (aged 30)	(Brazil) América	2006	0	0
32	Doni	(Brazil)	GK	22 October 1979 (aged 29)	(Brazil) Juventude	2005	126	0
Defenders
2	Christian Panucci (Vice-Captain)	(Italy)	RB / CB	12 April 1973 (aged 36)	(France) Monaco	2001	229	20
3	Cicinho	(Brazil)	RB	24 June 1980 (aged 29)	(Spain) Real Madrid	2007	52	3
4	Juan	(Brazil)	CB	1 February 1979 (aged 30)	(Germany) Bayer Leverkusen	2007	43	4
5	Philippe Mexès	(France)	CB	30 March 1982 (aged 27)	(France) Auxerre	2004	142	9
13	Marco Motta	(Italy)	RB	14 May 1986 (aged 23)	(Italy) Udinese	2009	13	0
15	Simone Loria	(Italy)	CB	28 October 1976 (aged 32)	(Italy) Siena	2008	9	1
17	John Arne Riise	(Norway)	LB	24 September 1980 (aged 28)	(England) Liverpool	2008	31	2
21	Souleymane Diamoutene	(Mali)	CB	30 January 1983 (aged 26)	(Italy) Lecce	2009	4	0
22	Max Tonetto	(Italy)	LB	18 November 1974 (aged 34)	(Italy) Sampdoria	2006	80	1
37	Alessandro Crescenzi	(Italy)	RB / LB	25 September 1991 (aged 17)	(Italy) Youth Sector	2008	1	0
77	Marco Cassetti	(Italy)	RB	29 May 1977 (aged 32)	(Italy) Lecce	2006	75	2
Midfielders
7	David Pizarro	(Chile)	CM / DM	11 September 1979 (aged 29)	(Italy) Internazionale	2006	88	6
8	Alberto Aquilani	(Italy)	CM / AM	7 July 1984 (aged 24)	(Italy) Youth Sector	2002	102	9
11	Rodrigo Taddei	(Brazil)	LM / RM / AM	6 March 1980 (aged 29)	(Italy) Siena	2005	121	20
14	Filipe Gomes	(Brazil)	CM	28 May 1987 (aged 22)	(Italy) Fiorentina Youth Sector	2008	4	0
16	Daniele De Rossi	(Italy)	DM / CM	24 July 1983 (aged 25)	(Italy) Youth Sector	2001	188	20
20	Simone Perrotta	(Italy)	LM / CM / AM	17 September 1977 (aged 31)	(Italy) Chievo	2004	153	26
33	Matteo Brighi	(Italy)	CM	14 February 1981 (aged 28)	(Italy) Juventus	2004	59	4
38	Marco D'Alessandro	(Italy)	CM	17 February 1991 (aged 18)	(Italy) Youth Sector	2008	3	0
39	Adrian Stoian	(Romania)	CM	11 February 1991 (aged 18)	(Romania) Școala de Fotbal Gheorghe Popescu	2008	1	0
Forwards
9	Mirko Vučinić	(Montenegro)	CF / ST	1 October 1983 (aged 25)	(Italy) Lecce	2006	85	22
10	Francesco Totti (Captain)	(Italy)	AM / LW / SS / CF / ST	27 September 1976 (aged 32)	(Italy) Youth Sector	1992	419	178
19	Júlio Baptista	(Brazil)	AM / CF / ST	1 October 1981 (aged 27)	(Spain) Real Madrid	2008	27	9
23	Vincenzo Montella	(Italy)	CF / ST	18 June 1974 (aged 35)	(Italy) Sampdoria	1999	192	83
94	Jérémy Ménez	(France)	ST / SS	7 May 1987 (aged 22)	(France) Monaco	2008	29	4
Players transferred during the season
34	Valerio Virga	(Italy)	CM	6 June 1986 (aged 23)	(Italy) Youth Sector	2004	11	0
89	Stefano Okaka	(Italy)	CF / ST	9 August 1989 (aged 19)	(Italy) Youth Sector	2005	23	1

== Transfers ==
=== In ===
—	DF	NOR	John Arne Riise (from Liverpool)
—	DF	ITA	Simone Loria (from Siena)
—	DF	ITA	Marco Andreolli (co-ownership renewed Internazionale)
—	GK	BRA	Artur (from Siena)
—	FW	ITA	Mauro Esposito (full ownership from Cagliari)
—	MF	ITA	Leandro Greco (full ownership from Hellas Verona)
—	FW	MNE	Mirko Vučinić (full ownership from Lecce)
—	FW	ITA	Alessio Cerci (end loan Pisa)
—	FW	ITA	Stefano Okaka (end loan Modena)
—	MF	ITA	Valerio Virga (end loan Grosseto)
—	FW	ITA	Vincenzo Montella (end loan Sampdoria)
—	MF	HON	Édgar Álvarez (end loan Livorno)
—	MF	ITA	Aleandro Rosi (end loan Chievo)
—	FW	BRA	Júlio Baptista (full ownership from Real Madrid)
—	FW	FRA	Jérémy Ménez (full ownership from Monaco)
—	DF	ITA	Marco Motta (loan from Udinese)
—	DF	MLI	Souleymane Diamoutene (loan from Lecce)
—	GK	CRO	Sugar David (loan from Bellinzona)

=== Out ===
—	FW	ITA	Alessio Cerci (loan Atalanta)
—	GK	ITA	Gianluca Curci (co-ownership Siena)
—	MF	GHA	Ahmed Apimah Barusso (loan Siena)
—	MF	ITA	Daniele Galloppa (full ownership Siena)
—	MF	ITA	Daniele Magliocchetti (co-ownership Cagliari)
—	DF	ITA	Matteo Ferrari (contract expired)
—	DF	ITA	Gianluca Freddi (full ownership Grosseto)
—	MF	ITA	Aleandro Rosi (loan Livorno)
—	FW	BRA	Mancini (Internazionale)
—	DF	POR	Vitorino Antunes (loan to Lecce)
—	MF	FRA	Ludovic Giuly (to Paris Saint-Germain)
—	MF	ROU	Adrian Piț (to Pisa)
—	MF	ITA	Leandro Greco (to Pisa)
—	FW	ITA	Claudio Della Penna (loan Pistoiese)
—	FW	ITA	Mauro Esposito (loan Chievo)
—	MF	HON	Édgar Álvarez (loan Pisa)
—	MF	ITA	Simone Palermo (co-ownership Treviso)
—	DF	ITA	Marco Andreolli (loan Sassuolo)
—	DF	ITA	Dario Polverini (loan Pro Patria)
—	MF	ITA	Andrea Giacomini (loan Gallipoli)

== Competitions ==
=== Overall ===
Competition	Started round	Final position	First match	Last match
Serie A	Matchday 1	6th	31 August 2008	31 May 2009
Supercoppa Italiana	Final	Runners-up	24 August 2008	
Coppa Italia	Round of 16	Quarter-finals	17 December 2008	21 January 2009
Champions League	Group stage	Round of 16	16 September 2008	11 March 2009

Last updated: 31 May 2009

=== Supercoppa Italiana ===
24 August 2008	Internazionale	2–2 (a.e.t.) (6–5 p)	Roma	Milan
20:45 CEST (UTC+02:00)	Muntari 18'; Ibrahimović (yellow card) 40'; Balotelli 84', (yellow card) 113'; Stanković (yellow card) 120'		Vučinić (yellow card) 12', (goal) 90+1'; Pizarro (yellow card) 31'; De Rossi 60'; Cassetti (yellow card) 85'	Stadium: San Siro; Referee: Massimiliano Saccani
	Penalties
	Ibrahimović (penalty scored); Balotelli (penalty scored); Stanković (penalty missed); Maxwell (penalty scored); Cambiasso (penalty scored); Jiménez (penalty scored); Zanetti (penalty scored)		(penalty scored) Vučinić; (penalty scored) Baptista; (penalty scored) Cassetti; (penalty scored) De Rossi; (penalty missed) Totti; (penalty scored) Pizarro; (penalty missed) Juan

=== Serie A ===
==== League table ====
Pos	Team	Pld	W	D	L	GF	GA	GD	Pts	Qualification or relegation
4	Fiorentina	38	21	5	12	53	38	+15	68 (Note: Fiorentina finished ahead of Genoa on head-to-head points: Fiorentina 1–0 Genoa, Genoa 3–3 Fiorentina.)	Qualification to Champions League play-off round
5	Genoa	38	19	11	8	56	39	+17	68	Qualification to Europa League play-off round (Note: Lazio qualified for the play-off round of the 2009–10 UEFA Europa League by winning the 2008–09 Coppa Italia.)
6	Roma	38	18	9	11	64	61	+3	63	Qualification to Europa League third qualifying round
7	Udinese	38	16	10	12	61	50	+11	58	
8	Palermo	38	17	6	15	57	50	+7	57	

Source: lega-calcio.it (in Italian)
Rules for classification: 1) points; 2) head-to-head points; 3) head-to-head goal difference; 4) head-to-head goals scored; 5) goal difference; 6) number of goals scored.

==== Results summary ====
Overall								Home						Away					
Pld	W	D	L	GF	GA	GD	Pts	W	D	L	GF	GA	GD	W	D	L	GF	GA	GD
38	18	9	11	64	61	+3	63	13	4	2	35	23	+12	5	5	9	29	38	−9

Last updated: 31 May 2009.
Source: Competitive matches

==== Results by round ====
Round	1	2	3	4	5	6	7	8	9	10	11	12	13	14	15	16	17	18	19	20	21	22	23	24	25	26	27	28	29	30	31	32	33	34	35	36	37	38
Ground	H	A	H	A	H	A	H	A	H	A	A	H	A	H	A	H	A	H	A	A	H	A	H	A	H	A	H	A	H	H	A	H	A	H	A	H	A	H
Result	D	L	W	L	W	L	L	L	W	L	D	W	W	W	W	W	L	D	W	W	W	D	W	L	W	D	D	D	L	W	L	W	L	D	D	W	W	W
Position	12	17	8	14	10	14	14	15	13	15	15	12	12	12	9	7	8	8	8	6	5	6	6	6	6	6	6	6	6	6	6	6	6	6	6	6	6	6

Updated to match(es) played on 31 May 2009. Source: Competitive matches
A = Away; H = Home; W = Win; D = Draw; L = Loss

==== Matches ====
31 August 2008 1	Roma	1–1	Napoli	Rome
15:00 CEST (UTC+02:00)	Aquilani 29', (yellow card) 41'; De Rossi (yellow card) 57'	Report	Vitale (yellow card) 39'; Santacroce (yellow card) 49' (yellow-red card) 54'; Hamšík 55'	Stadium: Stadio Olimpico; Attendance: 38,983; Referee: Nicola Rizzoli

13 September 2008 2	Palermo	3–1	Roma	Palermo
18:00 CEST (UTC+02:00)	Miccoli 20', 56'; Bresciano (yellow card) 59'; Cavani 72'	Report	Baptista 8'; Taddei (yellow card) 11'; Pizarro (yellow card) 90'	Stadium: Stadio Renzo Barbera; Attendance: 22,917; Referee: Massimiliano Saccani

20 September 2008 3	Roma	3–0	Reggina	Rome
20:30 CEST (UTC+02:00)	Panucci 45+1'; Aquilani 51'; Perrotta 90+4'	Report	Valdez (yellow card) 10'; Lanzaro (yellow card) 55'	Stadium: Stadio Olimpico; Attendance: 32,667; Referee: Andrea Gervasoni

24 September 2008 4	Genoa	3–1	Roma	Genoa
20:30 CEST (UTC+02:00)	Sculli 4'; Criscito (yellow card) 45'; Milito 61', 87'; Jurić (yellow card) 75'; Olivera (yellow card) 86'	Report	De Rossi 28', (yellow card) 53' (yellow-red card) 68'; Perrotta (yellow card) 38'; Ménez (yellow card) 43'; Cicinho (yellow card) 72'; Loria (yellow card) 82'; Aquilani (yellow card) 90'	Stadium: Stadio Luigi Ferraris; Attendance: 24,884; Referee: Christian Brighi

28 September 2008 5	Roma	2–0	Atalanta	Rome
15:00 CEST (UTC+02:00)	Panucci 17'; Vučinić 31', (yellow card) 40'; Virga (yellow card) 90+2'	Report	Cigarini (yellow card) 41'; De Ascentis (yellow card) 85'	Stadium: Stadio Olimpico; Attendance: 32,500; Referee: Paolo Tagliavento

5 October 2008 6	Siena	1–0	Roma	Siena
15:00 CEST (UTC+02:00)	Frick 45+1'; Portanova (yellow card) 82'; Curci (yellow card) 86'; Coppola (yellow card) 90+2'	Report	Panucci (yellow card) 46' (yellow-red card) 74'; Perrotta (yellow card) 53'; Mexès (yellow card) 64' (yellow-red card) 66'	Stadium: Stadio Artemio Franchi – Montepaschi Arena; Attendance: 12,980; Referee: Andrea De Marco

19 October 2008 7	Roma	0–4	Internazionale	Rome
20:30 CEST (UTC+02:00)	Vučinić (yellow card) 33'	Report	Ibrahimović 5', 47'; Stanković 54'; Obinna 56'; Chivu (yellow card) 76'	Stadium: Stadio Olimpico; Attendance: 48,958; Referee: Nicola Rizzoli

26 October 2008 8	Udinese	3–1	Roma	Udine
15:00 CET (UTC+01:00)	Di Natale 10' (pen.), 51'; Floro Flores 22', (yellow card) 68'; Luković (yellow card) 38'; Isla (yellow card) 57'; Handanović (yellow card) 75'	Report	Tonetto (yellow card) 9'; Vučinić (yellow card) 29'; Cicinho (yellow card) 59'; Totti 75' (pen.), (yellow card) 90'	Stadium: Stadio Friuli; Attendance: 16,134; Referee: Massimiliano Saccani

1 November 2008 10	Juventus	2–0	Roma	Turin
20:30 CET (UTC+01:00)	Del Piero 38'; Marchionni 48'	Report	Pizarro (yellow card) 8'; Panucci (yellow card) 15'	Stadium: Stadio Olimpico di Torino; Attendance: 21,700; Referee: Nicola Rizzoli

8 November 2008 11	Bologna	1–1	Roma	Bologna
20:30 CET (UTC+01:00)	Mudingayi (yellow card) 11'; Cicinho 90+2' (o.g.); Terzi (yellow card) 90+5'	Report	Totti 69', (yellow card) 71'; Pizarro (yellow card) 89'	Stadium: Stadio Renato Dall'Ara; Attendance: 17,356; Referee: Daniele Orsato

16 November 2008 12	Roma	1–0	Lazio	Rome
20:30 CET (UTC+01:00)	Tonetto (yellow card) 6'; Baptista 50'; Perrotta (yellow card) 75' (yellow-red card) 87'	Report	Ledesma (yellow card) 7' (yellow-red card) 66'; Radu (yellow card) 54'; Lichtsteiner (yellow card) 57'	Stadium: Stadio Olimpico; Attendance: 61,198; Referee: Gianluca Rocchi

23 November 2008 13	Lecce	0–3	Roma	Lecce
15:00 CET (UTC+01:00)	Esposito (yellow card) 57'	Report	Vučinić 11'; Juan 38'; Baptista (yellow card) 45'; Totti 49'	Stadium: Stadio Via del Mare; Attendance: 11,082; Referee: Andrea Gervasoni

30 November 2008 14	Roma	1–0	Fiorentina	Rome
18:00 CET (UTC+01:00)	De Rossi (yellow card) 19'; Totti 59'; Taddei (yellow card) 77'	Report	Melo (yellow card) 57'; Mutu (yellow card) 63'	Stadium: Stadio Olimpico; Attendance: 37,565; Referee: Paolo Tagliavento

6 December 2008 15	Chievo	0–1	Roma	Verona
18:00 CET (UTC+01:00)	Pinzi (yellow card) 37'; Mandelli (yellow card) 77'; Yepes (yellow card) 90'	Report	Mexès (yellow card) 45'; Brighi (yellow card) 62' (yellow-red card) 85'; Ménez (yellow card) 65', (goal) 69'	Stadium: Stadio Marc'Antonio Bentegodi; Attendance: 13,137; Referee: Emidio Morganti

14 December 2008 16	Roma	3–2	Cagliari	Rome
15:00 CET (UTC+01:00)	Totti 39'; Cicinho (yellow card) 71'; Perrotta 77'; Vučinić 90', (yellow card) 90+1'	Report	Conti (yellow card) 30', (goal) 58'; Biondini (yellow card) 47'; Jeda 69'; Marchetti (yellow card) 81'	Stadium: Stadio Olimpico; Attendance: 33,741; Referee: Matteo Trefoloni

21 December 2008 17	Catania	3–2	Roma	Catania
15:00 CET (UTC+01:00)	Stovini (yellow card) 30'; Baiocco 34', (yellow card) 90+4'; Morimoto 40', 56', (yellow card) 79'; Terlizzi (yellow card) 70'; Tedesco (yellow card) 76'	Report	Vučinić (yellow card) 28', (goal) 74'; Perrotta (yellow card) 55'; Cassetti (yellow card) 57'; Ménez 78'; De Rossi (yellow card) 79'; Mexès (yellow card) 83'	Stadium: Stadio Angelo Massimino; Attendance: 19,401; Referee: Roberto Rosetti

11 January 2009 18	Roma	2–2	Milan	Rome
15:00 CET (UTC+01:00)	Vučinić 22', 71'; Riise (yellow card) 64'; Brighi (yellow card) 73'	Report	Pirlo (yellow card) 24'; Pato 48', 53'; Seedorf (yellow card) 57'	Stadium: Stadio Olimpico; Attendance: 53,444; Referee: Emidio Morganti

14 January 2009 9	Roma	2–0	Sampdoria	Rome
20:30 CET (UTC+01:00)	Baptista 21', 53'; Perrotta (yellow card) 31'; Aquilani (yellow card) 82'	Report	Dessena (yellow card) 39'; Gastaldello (yellow card) 50'; Lucchini (yellow card) 90+3'	Stadium: Stadio Olimpico; Attendance: 32,304; Referee: Paolo Tagliavento
Note: Rescheduled from 29 October 2008.

18 January 2009 19	Torino	0–1	Roma	Turin
15:00 CET (UTC+01:00)	Barone (yellow card) 17' (red card) 90+1'; Amoruso (yellow card) 41'; Colombo (yellow card) 54'	Report	Pizarro (yellow card) 21'; Baptista 90+1'; Cicinho (yellow card) 90+3'	Stadium: Stadio Olimpico di Torino; Attendance: 16,080; Referee: Gianluca Rocchi

25 January 2009 20	Napoli	0–3	Roma	Naples
15:00 CET (UTC+01:00)	Pazienza (yellow card) 21'; Contini (yellow card) 55'; Cannavaro (yellow card) 63'; Gargano (yellow card) 68'; Montervino (yellow card) 84'; Santacroce (yellow card) 86'	Report	Mexès 18'; Juan 32'; Vučinić 49'; Taddei (yellow card) 53'	Stadium: Stadio San Paolo; Attendance: 60,240; Referee: Emidio Morganti

28 January 2009 21	Roma	2–1	Palermo	Rome
20:30 CET (UTC+01:00)	Totti 24'; Brighi 45+2'; Doni (yellow card) 90+3'	Report	Cavani 31'; Liverani (yellow card) 73'	Stadium: Stadio Olimpico; Attendance: 34,322; Referee: Nicola Pierpaoli

1 February 2009 22	Reggina	2–2	Roma	Reggio Calabria
15:15 CET (UTC+01:00)	Santos (yellow card) 36'; Corradi 43' (pen.); Cirillo (yellow card) 57'; Cozza 81'	Report	Mexès (yellow card) 42'; Pizarro 45+1', 58'	Stadium: Stadio Oreste Granillo; Attendance: 9,926; Referee: Roberto Rosetti

8 February 2009 23	Roma	3–0	Genoa	Rome
15:00 CET (UTC+01:00)	Cicinho 26'; Taddei (yellow card) 30' (yellow-red card) 53'; Vučinić 47'; Baptista 90+3'	Report	Sculli (yellow card) 23' (yellow-red card) 69'; Vanden Borre (yellow card) 42'; Biava (yellow card) 45'; Jurić (yellow card) 59'	Stadium: Stadio Olimpico; Attendance: 42,638; Referee: Gianluca Rocchi

15 February 2009 24	Atalanta	3–0	Roma	Bergamo
15:00 CET (UTC+01:00)	Capelli 52', (yellow card) 76'; Doni 56', 59'; Manfredini (yellow card) 67'	Report	Motta (yellow card) 54'; De Rossi (yellow card) 57'; Perrotta (yellow card) 85' (red card) 89'	Stadium: Stadio Atleti Azzurri d'Italia; Attendance: 7,503; Referee: Emidio Morganti

21 February 2009 25	Roma	1–0	Siena	Rome
18:00 CET (UTC+01:00)	Pizarro (yellow card) 34'; Taddei 63'	Report	Jarolím (yellow card) 18'; Codrea (yellow card) 57'; Brandão (yellow card) 62'; Galloppa (yellow card) 63'	Stadium: Stadio Olimpico; Attendance: 34,897; Referee: Gabriele Gava

1 March 2009 26	Internazionale	3–3	Roma	Milan
20:30 CET (UTC+01:00)	Zanetti (yellow card) 37'; Balotelli 50', 62' (pen.); Stanković (yellow card) 67'; Crespo 79'; Vieira (yellow card) 83'	Report	De Rossi 23', (yellow card) 68'; Riise 29', (yellow card) 77'; Pizarro (yellow card) 45+1'; Brighi 57'	Stadium: San Siro; Attendance: 51,497; Referee: Nicola Rizzoli

7 March 2009 27	Roma	1–1	Udinese	Rome
15:00 CET (UTC+01:00)	Mexès (yellow card) 39'; Panucci (yellow card) 53'; Vučinić 61', (yellow card) 86'; De Rossi (yellow card) 68' (red card) 68'	Report	Di Natale (yellow card) 21'; Felipe 54'; Pepe (yellow card) 57'; D'Agostino (yellow card) 89'; Sánchez (yellow card) 90+1'	Stadium: Stadio Olimpico; Attendance: 37,172; Referee: Paolo Tagliavento

15 March 2009 28	Sampdoria	2–2	Roma	Genoa
15:00 CET (UTC+01:00)	Palombo (yellow card) 9'; Pazzini 25', 43'; Padalino (yellow card) 50'; Lucchini (yellow card) 70'	Report	Baptista 7', 70' (pen.); Diamoutene (yellow card) 25'; Motta (yellow card) 32' (yellow-red card) 62'; Pizarro (yellow card) 84'	Stadium: Stadio Luigi Ferraris; Attendance: 21,430; Referee: Roberto Rosetti

21 March 2009 29	Roma	1–4	Juventus	Rome
20:30 CET (UTC+01:00)	Loria (yellow card) 24', (goal) 48'; Mexès (yellow card) 40'; Riise (yellow card) 67'; Ménez (yellow card) 78'	Report	Tiago (yellow card) 29'; Iaquinta 34', 55'; Mellberg 69'; Molinaro (yellow card) 70'; Nedvěd 74'	Stadium: Stadio Olimpico; Attendance: 56,789; Referee: Gianluca Rocchi

5 April 2009 30	Roma	2–1	Bologna	Rome
15:00 CEST (UTC+02:00)	Totti 12' (pen.), 58' (pen.); Pizarro (yellow card) 77'; Mexès (yellow card) 90+2'	Report	Bombardini (yellow card) 15'; Marazzina 26'; Castellini (yellow card) 58'; Mutarelli (yellow card) 63'	Stadium: Stadio Olimpico; Attendance: 34,000; Referee: Antonio Damato

11 April 2009 31	Lazio	4–2	Roma	Rome
15:00 CEST (UTC+02:00)	Pandev 2'; Zárate 4'; Brocchi (yellow card) 24'; Lichtsteiner 58', (yellow card) 62'; Matuzalém (red card) 75'; Kolarov 85'; Mauri (yellow card) 88'	Report	De Rossi (yellow card) 4', (goal) 80'; Mexès 10', (yellow card) 67' (red card) 75'; Pizarro (yellow card) 12'; Panucci (yellow card) 35' (yellow-red card) 62'	Stadium: Stadio Olimpico; Attendance: 55,490; Referee: Emidio Morganti

19 April 2009 32	Roma	3–2	Lecce	Rome
15:00 CEST (UTC+02:00)	Totti 3', 60' (pen.); Brighi 13'; Diamoutene (yellow card) 66'	Report	Zanchetta (yellow card) 17'; Munari 31'; Papadopoulos 55'; Ariatti (red card) 72'	Stadium: Stadio Olimpico; Attendance: 34,393; Referee: Paolo Mazzoleni

25 April 2009 33	Fiorentina	4–1	Roma	Florence
20:30 CEST (UTC+02:00)	Vargas 6', (yellow card) 6'; Donadel (yellow card) 20'; Dainelli (yellow card) 45+2'; Gilardino 47', 67'; Semioli (yellow card) 59'; Gobbi 73'	Report	Cassetti (yellow card) 27'; Brighi (yellow card) 50'; Pizarro (yellow card) 55' (yellow-red card) 59'; Baptista 87'	Stadium: Stadio Artemio Franchi; Attendance: 35,683; Referee: Luca Banti

3 May 2009 34	Roma	0–0	Chievo	Rome
15:00 CEST (UTC+02:00)	Riise (yellow card) 80'	Report	Bogdani (yellow card) 33'; Mantovani (yellow card) 58'; Pinzi (yellow card) 85' (yellow-red card) 90+3'	Stadium: Stadio Olimpico; Attendance: 33,821; Referee: Antonio Damato

10 May 2009 35	Cagliari	2–2	Roma	Cagliari
15:00 CEST (UTC+02:00)	Fini (yellow card) 17'; Matri 34'; Pisano (yellow card) 49'; Cossu (yellow card) 54'; Acquafresca 58'; Conti (yellow card) 70'	Report	Motta (yellow card) 45+4'; Totti 64', (yellow card) 70'; Perrotta 69'	Stadium: Stadio Sant'Elia; Attendance: 18,000; Referee: Gianluca Rocchi

16 May 2009 36	Roma	4–3	Catania	Rome
18:00 CEST (UTC+02:00)	Perrotta 13', 31'; Vučinić 17'; De Rossi (yellow card) 76'; Panucci 90+2'	Report	Tedesco 15'; Silvestre (yellow card) 18'; Mascara 47'; Morimoto 72'; Izco (yellow card) 90+1'	Stadium: Stadio Olimpico; Attendance: 31,726; Referee: Gabriele Gava

24 May 2009 37	Milan	2–3	Roma	Milan
15:00 CEST (UTC+02:00)	Ambrosini (yellow card) 52' (yellow-red card) 88', (goal) 75', 82'	Report	Riise 36'; Motta (yellow card) 53'; Artur (yellow card) 67'; Taddei (yellow card) 72'; Ménez 80'; Totti 85'	Stadium: San Siro; Attendance: 72,681; Referee: Andrea De Marco

31 May 2009 38	Roma	3–2	Torino	Rome
15:00 CEST (UTC+02:00)	Ménez 36'; Vučinić 74'; Mexès (yellow card) 81'; Totti 83' (pen.); Panucci (yellow card) 86'	Report	Vailatti 9'; Franceschini (yellow card) 37' (red card) 82'; Ventola 88'	Stadium: Stadio Olimpico; Attendance: 37,405; Referee: Antonio Damato

=== Coppa Italia ===
17 December 2008 Round of 16	Roma	2–0	Bologna	Rome
21:00 CET (UTC+01:00)	Vučinić 82', 85'			Stadium: Stadio Olimpico; Attendance: 14,944; Referee: Paolo Mazzoleni

21 January 2009 Quarter-finals	Internazionale	2–1	Roma	Milan
20:45 CET (UTC+01:00)	Adriano 10'; Samuel (yellow card) 22'; Ibrahimović 63'		Juan (yellow card) 8'; Vučinić (yellow card) 9'; Perrotta (yellow card) 45'; Taddei 61'; Mexès (yellow card) 83'	Stadium: San Siro; Attendance: 26,520; Referee: Daniele Orsato

=== UEFA Champions League ===
==== Group stage ====
Pos	Team	Pld	W	D	L	GF	GA	GD	Pts	Qualification
1	(Italy) Roma	6	4	0	2	12	6	+6	12	Advance to knockout phase
2	(England) Chelsea	6	3	2	1	9	5	+4	11	Advance to knockout phase
3	(France) Bordeaux	6	2	1	3	5	11	−6	7	Transfer to UEFA Cup
4	(Romania) CFR Cluj	6	1	1	4	5	9	−4	4	

Source: RSSSF

16 September 2008 1	Roma (Italy)	1–2	(Romania) CFR Cluj	Rome, Italy
20:45 CEST (UTC+02:00)	Panucci 17'; Cicinho (yellow card) 84'	Report	Pereira (yellow card) 8'; Culio 27', 49'; Peralta (yellow card) 90+3'	Stadium: Stadio Olimpico; Attendance: 25,382; Referee: Yuri Baskakov (Russia)

1 October 2008 2	Bordeaux (France)	1–3	(Italy) Roma	Bordeaux, France
20:45 CEST (UTC+02:00)	Gourcuff 18'; Diarra (yellow card) 30'; Henrique (red card) 36'; Chalmé (yellow card) 71'	Report	Panucci (yellow card) 55'; Taddei (yellow card) 57'; Baptista (yellow card) 60', (goal) 71', 83'; De Rossi (yellow card) 61'; Vučinić 64'	Stadium: Stade Chaban-Delmas; Attendance: 26,920; Referee: Alberto Undiano Mallenco (Spain)

22 October 2008 3	Chelsea (England)	1–0	(Italy) Roma	London, England
20:45 CEST (UTC+02:00)	Malouda (yellow card) 30'; Terry (yellow card) 72', (goal) 77'	Report	Mexès (yellow card) 22'; Panucci (yellow card) 85'	Stadium: Stamford Bridge; Attendance: 41,002; Referee: Kyros Vassaras (Greece)

4 November 2008 4	Roma (Italy)	3–1	(England) Chelsea	Rome, Italy
20:45 CET (UTC+01:00)	Panucci 34'; Vučinić 48', 58'; Perrotta (yellow card) 67'	Report	Deco (yellow card) 33' (yellow-red card) 81'; Terry 75'	Stadium: Stadio Olimpico; Attendance: 35,038; Referee: Luis Medina Cantalejo (Spain)

26 November 2008 5	CFR Cluj (Romania)	1–3	(Italy) Roma	Cluj-Napoca, Romania
20:45 CET (UTC+01:00)	Y. Koné 30'; Trică (yellow card) 74'; Panin (yellow card) 82'	Report	Brighi 11', 64'; Totti 23', (yellow card) 74'; De Rossi (yellow card) 57'	Stadium: Stadionul Dr. Constantin Rădulescu; Attendance: 19,292; Referee: Lucílio Batista (Portugal)

9 December 2008 6	Roma (Italy)	2–0	(France) Bordeaux	Rome, Italy
20:45 CET (UTC+01:00)	Brighi (yellow card) 37', (goal) 61'; Totti 79'	Report	Chalmé (yellow card) 25'; Jurietti (yellow card) 54'; Diawara (yellow card) 72'	Stadium: Stadio Olimpico; Attendance: 38,926; Referee: Herbert Fandel (Germany)

==== Knockout phase ====
===== Round of 16 =====
24 February 2009 First leg	Arsenal (England)	1–0	(Italy) Roma	London, England
20:45 CET (UTC+01:00)	Van Persie 37' (pen.); Touré (yellow card) 46'; Nasri (yellow card) 65'	Report	Mexès (yellow card) 14'; Brighi (yellow card) 25'; De Rossi (yellow card) 42'	Stadium: Emirates Stadium; Attendance: 60,003; Referee: Claus Bo Larsen (Denmark)

11 March 2009 Second leg	Roma (Italy)	1–0 (a.e.t.) (1–1 agg.) (6–7 p)	(England) Arsenal	Rome, Italy
20:45 CET (UTC+01:00)	Juan 9'; Pizarro (yellow card) 27'; Motta (yellow card) 89'	Report	Diaby (yellow card) 48'	Stadium: Stadio Olimpico; Attendance: 62,383; Referee: Manuel Mejuto González (Spain)
	Penalties
	Pizarro (penalty scored); Vučinić (penalty missed); Baptista (penalty scored); Montella (penalty scored); Totti (penalty scored); Aquilani (penalty scored); Riise (penalty scored); Tonetto (penalty missed)		(penalty missed) Eduardo; (penalty scored) Van Persie; (penalty scored) Walcott; (penalty scored) Nasri; (penalty scored) Denílson; (penalty scored) Touré; (penalty scored) Sagna; (penalty scored) Diaby

== Statistics ==
=== Appearances and goals ===
No.	Pos	Nat	Player	Total		Serie A		Supercoppa Italiana		Coppa Italia		Champions League	
No.	Pos	Nat	Player	Apps	Goals	Apps	Goals	Apps	Goals	Apps	Goals	Apps	Goals
Goalkeepers
25	GK	(Brazil) BRA	Artur	13	0	10+1	0	0	0	2	0	0	0
27	GK	(Brazil) BRA	Júlio Sérgio	0	0	0	0	0	0	0	0	0	0
32	GK	(Brazil) BRA	Doni	37	0	28	0	1	0	0	0	8	0
Defenders
2	DF	(Italy) ITA	Christian Panucci	28	5	21+1	3	0	0	1	0	5	2
3	DF	(Brazil) BRA	Cicinho	29	1	16+6	1	0	0	2	0	4+1	0
4	DF	(Brazil) BRA	Juan	27	3	20+1	2	1	0	1	0	4	1
5	DF	(France) FRA	Philippe Mexès	38	2	29	2	1	0	2	0	6	0
13	DF	(Italy) ITA	Marco Motta	29	0	19+8	0	0	0	0	0	2	0
15	DF	(Italy) ITA	Simone Loria	12	1	6+3	1	0	0	1	0	1+1	0
17	DF	(Norway) NOR	John Arne Riise	42	2	30+1	2	1	0	1+1	0	6+2	0
21	DF	(Mali) MLI	Souleymane Diamoutene	6	0	2+2	0	0	0	0	0	1+1	0
22	DF	(Italy) ITA	Max Tonetto	19	0	10+4	0	0+1	0	0	0	3+1	0
37	DF	(Italy) ITA	Alessandro Crescenzi	1	0	0+1	0	0	0	0	0	0	0
77	DF	(Italy) ITA	Marco Cassetti	24	0	13+7	0	1	0	1	0	2	0
Midfielders
7	MF	(Chile) CHI	David Pizarro	32	2	21+4	2	1	0	0+1	0	2+3	0
8	MF	(Italy) ITA	Alberto Aquilani	20	2	7+7	2	1	0	0+1	0	3+1	0
11	MF	(Brazil) BRA	Rodrigo Taddei	36	2	23+5	1	0	0	1	1	6+1	0
14	MF	(Brazil) BRA	Filipe Gomes	4	0	1+3	0	0	0	0	0	0	0
16	MF	(Italy) ITA	Daniele De Rossi	43	4	33	3	1	1	2	0	7	0
20	MF	(Italy) ITA	Simone Perrotta	33	5	22+3	5	1	0	1	0	5+1	0
33	MF	(Italy) ITA	Matteo Brighi	44	6	32+3	3	0	0	2	0	6+1	3
38	MF	(Italy) ITA	Marco D'Alessandro	3	0	0+3	0	0	0	0	0	0	0
39	MF	(Romania) ROU	Adrian Stoian	1	0	0+1	0	0	0	0	0	0	0
Forwards
9	FW	(Montenegro) MNE	Mirko Vučinić	38	17	24+3	11	1	1	1+1	2	5+3	3
10	FW	(Italy) ITA	Francesco Totti	31	15	22+1	13	0+1	0	0	0	6+1	2
19	FW	(Brazil) BRA	Júlio Baptista	37	11	23+4	9	1	0	2	0	4+3	2
23	FW	(Italy) ITA	Vincenzo Montella	15	0	0+12	0	0	0	1	0	0+2	0
94	FW	(France) FRA	Jérémy Ménez	34	4	12+17	4	0	0	1+1	0	2+1	0
Players transferred out during the season
34	MF	(Italy) ITA	Valerio Virga	1	0	0+1	0	0	0	0	0	0	0
89	FW	(Italy) ITA	Stefano Okaka	12	0	2+7	0	0+1	0	0+1	0	0+1	0

Last updated: 31 May 2009
Source: Competitions

=== Goalscorers ===
Rank	No.	Pos	Nat	Name	Serie A	Supercoppa	Coppa Italia	UEFA CL	Total
1	9	FW	(Montenegro)	Mirko Vučinić	11	1	2	3	17
2	10	FW	(Italy)	Francesco Totti	13	0	0	2	15
3	19	MF	(Brazil)	Júlio Baptista	9	0	0	2	11
4	33	MF	(Italy)	Matteo Brighi	3	0	0	3	6
5	2	DF	(Italy)	Christian Panucci	3	0	0	2	5
5	20	MF	(Italy)	Simone Perrotta	5	0	0	0	5
7	16	MF	(Italy)	Daniele De Rossi	3	1	0	0	4
7	24	FW	(France)	Jérémy Ménez	4	0	0	0	4
9	4	DF	(Brazil)	Juan	2	0	0	1	3
10	5	DF	(France)	Philippe Mexès	2	0	0	0	2
10	7	MF	(Chile)	David Pizarro	2	0	0	0	2
10	8	MF	(Italy)	Alberto Aquilani	2	0	0	0	2
10	11	MF	(Brazil)	Rodrigo Taddei	1	0	1	0	2
10	17	DF	(Norway)	John Arne Riise	2	0	0	0	2
15	3	DF	(Brazil)	Cicinho	1	0	0	0	1
15	15	DF	(Italy)	Simone Loria	1	0	0	0	1
Own goal					0	0	0	0	0
Totals					64	2	3	13	82

Last updated: 31 May 2009

=== Clean sheets ===
Rank	No.	Pos	Nat	Name	Serie A	Supercoppa	Coppa Italia	UEFA CL	Total
1	32	GK	(Brazil)	Doni	9	0	0	2	11
2	25	GK	(Brazil)	Artur	3	0	1	0	4
Totals					12	0	1	2	15

Last updated: 31 May 2009
