= 2008–09 UEFA Champions League =

European football tournament

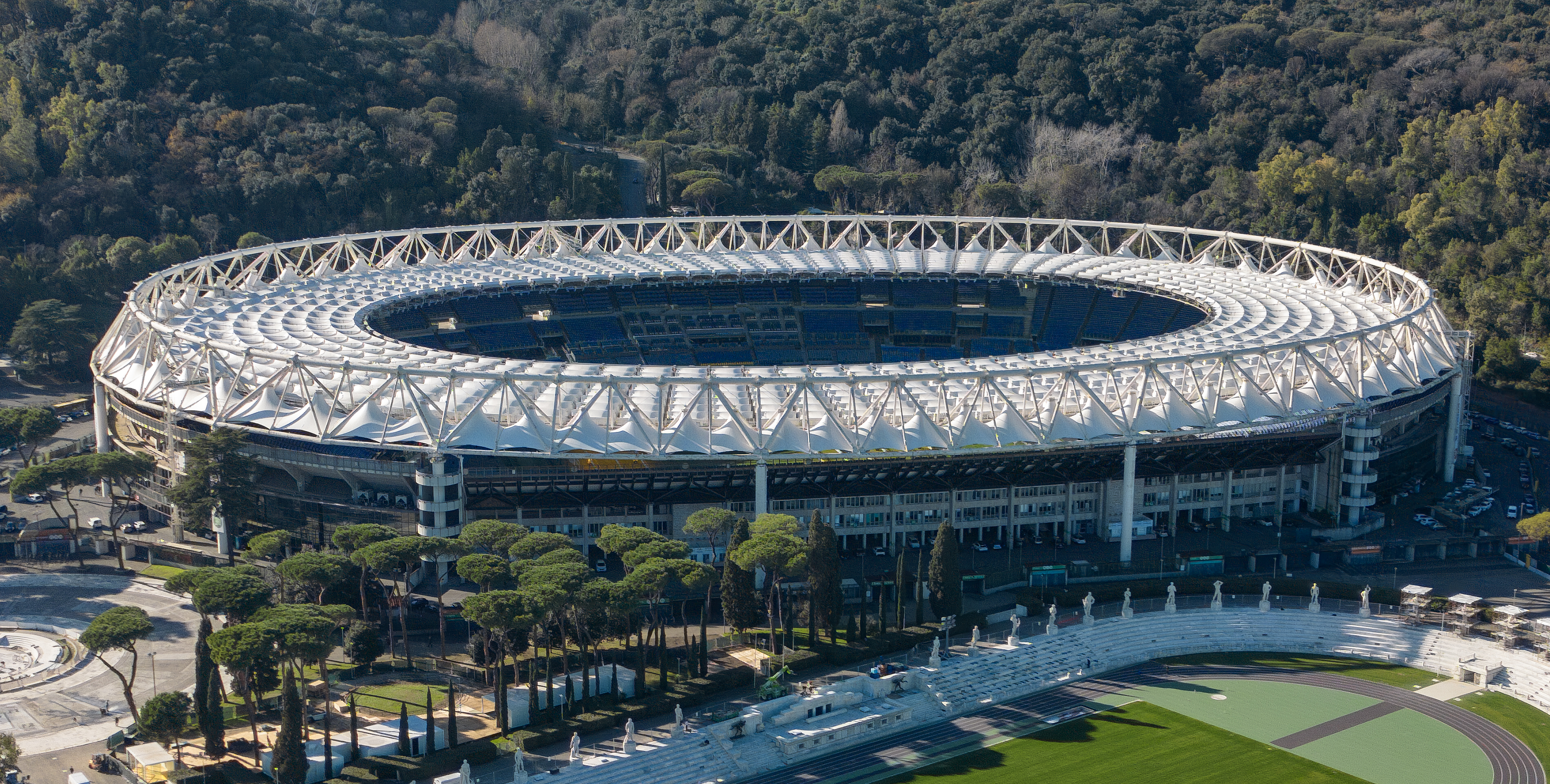
- The Stadio Olimpico in Rome hosted the final

Tournament details
- Dates: Qualifying: 15 July – 27 August 2008; Competition proper: 16 September 2008 – 27 May 2009
- Teams: Competition proper: 32; Total: 76

Final positions
- Champions: (Spain) Barcelona (3rd title)
- Runners-up: (England) Manchester United

Tournament statistics
- Matches played: 125
- Goals scored: 329 (2.63 per match)
- Attendance: 5,004,467 (40,036 per match)
- Top scorer(s): Lionel Messi (Barcelona); 9 goals

The 2008–09 UEFA Champions League was the 54th edition of Europe's premier club football tournament and the 17th edition under the current UEFA Champions League format. The final was played at the Stadio Olimpico in Rome, Italy, on 27 May 2009. It was the eighth time the European Cup final has been held in Italy and the fourth time it has been held at the Stadio Olimpico. The final was contested by the defending champions, Manchester United, and Barcelona, who had last won the tournament in 2006. Barcelona won the match 2–0, with goals from Samuel Eto'o and Lionel Messi, securing The Treble in the process. In addition, both UEFA Cup finalists, Werder Bremen and Shakhtar Donetsk featured in the Champions League group stage.

Anorthosis Famagusta of Cyprus and BATE Borisov of Belarus were the first teams from their respective countries to qualify for the group stage. Romanian side CFR Cluj and Russian champions Zenit Saint Petersburg also made their Champions League debuts.

== Association team allocation ==
A total of 76 teams from 52 UEFA associations (Liechtenstein organises no domestic league competition) participated in the 2008–09 Champions League. Countries are allocated places according to the 2007 UEFA league co-efficient ranking.

Below is the qualification scheme for the 2008–09 Champions League:

- Associations 1–3 each have four teams qualify.
- Associations 4–6 each have three teams qualify.
- Associations 7–15 each have two teams qualify.
- Associations 16–53 (except Liechtenstein) each have one team qualify.

=== Association ranking ===
For the 2008–09 UEFA Champions League, the associations are allocated places according to their 2007 UEFA country coefficients, which takes into account their performance in European competitions from 2002–03 to 2006–07.

Rank	Association	Coeff.	Teams
1	Spain	76.891	4
2	England	68.540	4
3	Italy	66.088	4
4	France	53.656	3
5	Germany	44.364	3
6	Portugal	42.749	3
7	Romania	40.165	2
8	Netherlands	39.379	2
9	Russia	36.125	2
10	Scotland	30.500	2
11	Ukraine	29.475	2
12	Belgium	29.075	2
13	Czech Republic	26.825	2
14	Turkey	26.641	2
15	Greece	25.497	2
16	Bulgaria	24.582	1
17	Switzerland	23.850	1
18	Norway	19.725	1

Rank	Association	Coeff.	Teams
19	Israel	19.208	1
20	Serbia	18.958	1
21	Denmark	18.575	1
22	Austria	18.500	1
23	Poland	17.000	1
24	Hungary	14.165	1
25	Slovakia	10.832	1
26	Croatia	10.708	1
27	Cyprus	10.582	1
28	Sweden	10.541	1
29	Slovenia	9.915	1
30	Bosnia and Herzegovina	9.665	1
31	Latvia	8.664	1
32	Lithuania	7.332	1
33	Finland	7.331	1
34	Moldova	7.166	1
35	Republic of Ireland	6.498	1
36	Georgia	6.164	1

Rank	Association	Coeff.	Teams
37	Liechtenstein	6.000	0
38	Macedonia	5.831	1
39	Iceland	4.999	1
40	Belarus	4.665	1
41	Albania	3.832	1
42	Estonia	3.665	1
43	Armenia	3.498	1
44	Azerbaijan	3.166	1
45	Kazakhstan	2.332	1
46	Northern Ireland	2.165	1
47	Wales	1.998	1
48	Faroe Islands	1.665	1
49	Luxembourg	1.665	1
50	Malta	1.665	1
51	San Marino	0.000	1
52	Andorra	0.000	1
53	Montenegro	0.000	1

=== Distribution ===
Since the title holders (Manchester United) qualified for the Champions League group stage through their domestic league, the group stage spot reserved for the title holders is vacated, and the following changes to the default access list are made:

- The champions of association 10 (Scotland) are promoted from the third qualifying round to the group stage.
- The champions of association 16 (Bulgaria) are promoted from the second qualifying round to the third qualifying round.
- The champions of associations 23 (Poland) and 24 (Hungary) are promoted from the first qualifying round to the second qualifying round.

	Teams entering in this round	Teams advancing from previous round
First qualifying round (28 teams)	28 champions from associations 25–53	
Second qualifying round (28 teams)	8 champions from associations 17–24; 6 runners-up from associations 10–15	14 winners from the first qualifying round
Third qualifying round (32 teams)	6 champions from associations 11–16; 3 runners-up from associations 7–9; 6 third-place finishers from associations 1–6; 3 fourth-place finishers from associations 1–3	14 winners from the second qualifying round
Group stage (32 teams)	10 champions from associations 1–10; 6 runners-up from associations 1–6	16 winners from the third qualifying round
Knockout phase (16 teams)		8 group winners from the group stage; 8 group runners-up from the group stage

=== Teams ===
League positions of the previous season shown in parentheses (TH: Title holders).

Group stage
(Spain) Real Madrid (1st)	(Italy) Internazionale (1st)	(Germany) Bayern Munich (1st)	(Romania) CFR Cluj (1st)
(Spain) Villarreal (2nd)	(Italy) Roma (2nd)	(Germany) Werder Bremen (2nd)	(Netherlands) PSV Eindhoven (1st)
(England) Manchester United (1st)^{TH}	(France) Lyon (1st)	(Portugal) Porto (1st)	(Russia) Zenit Saint Petersburg (1st)
(England) Chelsea (2nd)	(France) Bordeaux (2nd)	(Portugal) Sporting CP (2nd)	(Scotland) Celtic (1st)
Third qualifying round
(Spain) Barcelona (3rd)	(Italy) Fiorentina (4th)	(Netherlands) Twente (PO)	(Czech Republic) Slavia Prague (1st)
(Spain) Atlético Madrid (4th)	(France) Marseille (3rd)	(Russia) Spartak Moscow (2nd)	(Turkey) Galatasaray (1st)
(England) Arsenal (3rd)	(Germany) Schalke 04 (3rd)	(Ukraine) Shakhtar Donetsk (1st)	(Greece) Olympiacos (1st)
(England) Liverpool (4th)	(Portugal) Vitória de Guimarães (3rd)	(Belgium) Standard Liège (1st)	(Bulgaria) Levski Sofia (2nd)
(Italy) Juventus (3rd)	(Romania) F.C. Steaua București (2nd)		
Second qualifying round
(Scotland) Rangers (2nd)	(Turkey) Fenerbahçe (2nd)	(Israel) Beitar Jerusalem (1st)	(Austria) Rapid Wien (1st)
(Ukraine) Dynamo Kyiv (2nd)	(Greece) Panathinaikos (PO)	(Serbia) Partizan (1st)	(Poland) Wisła Kraków (1st)
(Belgium) Anderlecht (2nd)	(Switzerland) Basel (1st)	(Denmark) AaB (1st)	(Hungary) MTK Budapest (1st)
(Czech Republic) Sparta Prague (2nd)	(Norway) Brann (1st)		
First qualifying round
(Slovakia) Artmedia Petržalka (1st)	(Lithuania) Kaunas (1st)	(Belarus) BATE Borisov (1st)	(Wales) Llanelli (1st)
(Croatia) Dinamo Zagreb (1st)	(Finland) Tampere United (1st)	(Albania) Dinamo Tirana (1st)	(Faroe Islands) NSÍ (1st)
(Cyprus) Anorthosis Famagusta (1st)	(Moldova) Sheriff Tiraspol (1st)	(Estonia) Levadia Tallinn (1st)	(Luxembourg) F91 Dudelange (1st)
(Sweden) IFK Göteborg (1st)	(Republic of Ireland) Drogheda United (1st)	(Armenia) Pyunik (1st)	(Malta) Valletta (1st)
(Slovenia) Domžale (1st)	(Georgia (country)) Dinamo Tbilisi (1st)	(Azerbaijan) Inter Baku (1st)	(Andorra) FC Santa Coloma (1st)
(Bosnia and Herzegovina) Modriča Maxima (1st)	(North Macedonia) Rabotnicki (1st)	(Kazakhstan) Aktobe (1st)	(San Marino) Murata (1st)
(Latvia) Ventspils (1st)	(Iceland) Valur (1st)	(Northern Ireland) Linfield (1st)	(Montenegro) Budućnost Podgorica (1st)

Notes

1. Portugal (POR): On 4 June 2008, a decision was taken to exclude Portuguese champions Porto from this year's competition, after the club was found guilty of bribing referees in the Primeira Liga during the 2003–04 season. As a result, Vitória de Guimarães were promoted from the third qualifying round to the group stage, and Benfica from the UEFA Cup into the third qualifying round. After Porto appealed the decision, however, it was referred by UEFA's Appeals Body back to the Control & Disciplinary Body for re-assessment. The meeting to re-assess the situation took place on 16 June 2008, with the decision being reversed and Porto being allowed back into the 2008–09 Champions League. The decision was taken due to Porto's disciplinary process in Portugal not yet being complete.
2. Bulgaria (BUL): Bulgarian champions CSKA Sofia failed to obtain UEFA licence due to unpaid debts and were replaced by league runners-up Levski Sofia.

== Round and draw dates ==
Phase	Round	Draw date	First leg	Second leg
Qualifying	First qualifying round	1 July 2008	15–16 July 2008	22–23 July 2008
Qualifying	Second qualifying round	1 July 2008	29–30 July 2008	5–6 August 2008
Qualifying	Third qualifying round	1 August 2008	12–13 August 2008	26–27 August 2008
Group stage	Matchday 1	28 August 2008	16–17 September 2008	
Group stage	Matchday 2	28 August 2008	30 September–1 October 2008	
Group stage	Matchday 3	28 August 2008	21–22 October 2008	
Group stage	Matchday 4	28 August 2008	4–5 November 2008	
Group stage	Matchday 5	28 August 2008	25–26 November 2008	
Group stage	Matchday 6	28 August 2008	9–10 December 2008	
Knockout phase	Round of 16	19 December 2008	24–25 February 2009	10–11 March 2009
Knockout phase	Quarter-finals	20 March 2009	7–8 April 2009	14–15 April 2009
Knockout phase	Semi-finals	20 March 2009	28–29 April 2009	5–6 May 2009
Knockout phase	Final	20 March 2009	27 May 2009 at Stadio Olimpico, Rome	

== Qualifying rounds ==
=== First qualifying round ===
The draw for the first qualifying round took place on 1 July 2008 in Nyon, Switzerland. The first legs were held on 15 and 16 July, while the second legs were played on 22 and 23 July 2008.

Two of the 14 ties were won by the team with the lower UEFA coefficient: Inter Baku (Azerbaijan, country rank 42) beat Rabotnicki (Macedonia, 36); and BATE Borisov (Belarus, 40) beat Valur (Iceland, 37). Of the 28 teams in the first qualifying round, two survived as far as the group stage: Anorthosis Famagusta and BATE Borisov.

Team 1	Agg.	Team 2	1st leg	2nd leg
Linfield (Northern Ireland)	1–3	(Croatia) Dinamo Zagreb	0–2	1–1
Valletta (Malta)	0–3	(Slovakia) Artmedia Petržalka	0–2	0–1
Dinamo Tbilisi (Georgia (country))	3–1	(Faroe Islands) NSÍ	3–0	0–1
FC Santa Coloma (Andorra)	2–7	(Lithuania) Kaunas	1–4	1–3
Murata (San Marino)	0–9	(Sweden) IFK Göteborg	0–5	0–4
Llanelli (Wales)	1–4	(Latvia) Ventspils	1–0	0–4
Anorthosis Famagusta (Cyprus)	3–0	(Armenia) Pyunik	1–0	2–0
Inter Baku (Azerbaijan)	1–1 (a)	(North Macedonia) Rabotnicki	0–0	1–1
Tampere United (Finland)	3–2	(Montenegro) Budućnost Podgorica	2–1	1–1
F91 Dudelange (Luxembourg)	0–3	(Slovenia) Domžale	0–1	0–2
Dinamo Tirana (Albania)	1–4	(Bosnia and Herzegovina) Modriča Maxima	0–2	1–2
Aktobe (Kazakhstan)	1–4	(Moldova) Sheriff Tiraspol	1–0	0–4
Drogheda United (Republic of Ireland)	3–1	(Estonia) Levadia Tallinn	2–1	1–0
BATE Borisov (Belarus)	3–0	(Iceland) Valur	2–0	1–0

=== Second qualifying round ===
The draw for the second qualifying round took place on 1 July 2008 in Nyon, Switzerland, immediately after the draw for the first qualifying round. The first legs were played on 29 and 30 July, while the second legs were played on 5 and 6 August 2008.

Three of the 14 ties were won by the team with the lower UEFA coefficient: Kaunas (unranked, coefficient 2.640) beat Rangers (ranked 24, coefficient 66.013); BATE Borisov (unranked, 1.760) beat Anderlecht (56, 41.810); and Anorthosis Famagusta (ranked 193) beat Rapid Wien (ranked 166). Of the 28 teams in the second qualifying round, Panathinaikos were the only one to qualify for the knockout phase of the competition.

Team 1	Agg.	Team 2	1st leg	2nd leg
Rangers (Scotland)	1–2	(Lithuania) Kaunas	0–0	1–2
Brann (Norway)	2–2 (a)	(Latvia) Ventspils	1–0	1–2
Inter Baku (Azerbaijan)	1–3	(Serbia) Partizan	1–1	0–2
Tampere United (Finland)	3–7	(Slovakia) Artmedia Petržalka	1–3	2–4
Anorthosis Famagusta (Cyprus)	4–3	(Austria) Rapid Wien	3–0	1–3
Domžale (Slovenia)	2–6	(Croatia) Dinamo Zagreb	0–3	2–3
Panathinaikos (Greece)	3–0	(Georgia (country)) Dinamo Tbilisi	3–0	0–0
IFK Göteborg (Sweden)	3–5	(Switzerland) Basel	1–1	2–4
Sheriff Tiraspol (Moldova)	0–3	(Czech Republic) Sparta Prague	0–1	0–2
Drogheda United (Republic of Ireland)	3–4	(Ukraine) Dynamo Kyiv	1–2	2–2
Anderlecht (Belgium)	3–4	(Belarus) BATE Borisov	1–2	2–2
Beitar Jerusalem (Israel)	2–6	(Poland) Wisła Kraków	2–1	0–5
Fenerbahçe (Turkey)	7–0	(Hungary) MTK Budapest	2–0	5–0
AaB (Denmark)	7–1	(Bosnia and Herzegovina) Modriča Maxima	5–0	2–1

=== Third qualifying round ===
The draw for the third qualifying round took place on 1 August 2008 in Nyon, Switzerland. The first legs were played on 12 and 13 August, while the second legs were played on 26 and 27 August. The winners of each tie advanced to the group stage, while the losers were seeded into the 2008–09 UEFA Cup first round.

Four of the 16 ties were won by the team with the lower UEFA coefficient: Anorthosis Famagusta (ranked 193) beat Olympiacos (ranked 44); BATE Borisov (unranked, coefficient 1.760) beat Levski Sofia (ranked 80, coefficient 32.644); Atlético Madrid (ranked 67) beat Schalke 04 (ranked 22) and Dynamo Kyiv (ranked 74) beat Spartak Moscow (ranked 61).

Team 1	Agg.	Team 2	1st leg	2nd leg
Anorthosis Famagusta (Cyprus)	3–1	(Greece) Olympiacos	3–0	0–1
Vitória de Guimarães (Portugal)	1–2	(Switzerland) Basel	0–0	1–2
Shakhtar Donetsk (Ukraine)	5–1	(Croatia) Dinamo Zagreb	2–0	3–1
Schalke 04 (Germany)	1–4	(Spain) Atlético Madrid	1–0	0–4
AaB (Denmark)	4–0	(Lithuania) Kaunas	2–0	2–0
Barcelona (Spain)	4–1	(Poland) Wisła Kraków	4–0	0–1
Levski Sofia (Bulgaria)	1–2	(Belarus) BATE Borisov	0–1	1–1
Standard Liège (Belgium)	0–1	(England) Liverpool	0–0	0–1 (a.e.t.)
Partizan (Serbia)	3–4	(Turkey) Fenerbahçe	2–2	1–2
Twente (Netherlands)	0–6	(England) Arsenal	0–2	0–4
Spartak Moscow (Russia)	2–8	(Ukraine) Dynamo Kyiv	1–4	1–4
Juventus (Italy)	5–1	(Slovakia) Artmedia Petržalka	4–0	1–1
Brann (Norway)	1–3	(France) Marseille	0–1	1–2
Fiorentina (Italy)	2–0	(Czech Republic) Slavia Prague	2–0	0–0
Galatasaray (Turkey)	2–3	(Romania) Steaua București	2–2	0–1
Sparta Prague (Czech Republic)	1–3 (Note: Order of legs reversed after original draw.)	(Greece) Panathinaikos	1–2	0–1

== Group stage ==
Location of teams of the 2008–09 UEFA Champions League group stage.
Brown: Group A; Red: Group B; Orange: Group C; Yellow: Group D;
Green: Group E; Blue: Group F; Purple: Group G; Pink: Group H.

The draw for the group stage took place on 28 August 2008 at the Grimaldi Forum, Monaco, prior to the 2008 UEFA Super Cup the following day.

The top two teams in each group advanced to the knockout phase, and the third-placed teams entered the round of 32 of the UEFA Cup. Based on paragraph 6.05 in the regulations for the current season, if two or more teams are equal on points on completion of the group matches, the following criteria are applied to determine the rankings:

1. higher number of points obtained in the group matches played among the teams in question;
2. superior goal difference from the group matches played among the teams in question;
3. higher number of goals scored away from home in the group matches played among the teams in question;
4. superior goal difference from all group matches played;
5. higher number of goals scored in all group matches played;
6. higher number of coefficient points accumulated by the club in question, as well as its association, over the previous five seasons.

Anorthosis Famagusta, BATE Borisov, CFR Cluj and Zenit Saint Petersburg made their debuts in the group stage.

=== Group A ===
Pos	Team	Pld	W	D	L	GF	GA	GD	Pts	Qualification	ROM	CHE	BOR	CLJ
1	(Italy) Roma	6	4	0	2	12	6	+6	12	Advance to knockout phase	—	3–1	2–0	1–2
2	(England) Chelsea	6	3	2	1	9	5	+4	11	Advance to knockout phase	1–0	—	4–0	2–1
3	(France) Bordeaux	6	2	1	3	5	11	−6	7	Transfer to UEFA Cup	1–3	1–1	—	1–0
4	(Romania) CFR Cluj	6	1	1	4	5	9	−4	4		1–3	0–0	1–2	—

Source: RSSSF

=== Group B ===
Pos	Team	Pld	W	D	L	GF	GA	GD	Pts	Qualification	PAN	INT	BRM	ANO
1	(Greece) Panathinaikos	6	3	1	2	8	7	+1	10	Advance to knockout phase	—	0–2	2–2	1–0
2	(Italy) Internazionale	6	2	2	2	8	7	+1	8	Advance to knockout phase	0–1	—	1–1	1–0
3	(Germany) Werder Bremen	6	1	4	1	7	9	−2	7	Transfer to UEFA Cup	0–3	2–1	—	0–0
4	(Cyprus) Anorthosis Famagusta	6	1	3	2	8	8	0	6		3–1	3–3	2–2	—

Source: RSSSF

=== Group C ===
Pos	Team	Pld	W	D	L	GF	GA	GD	Pts	Qualification	BAR	SPO	SHK	BSL
1	(Spain) Barcelona	6	4	1	1	18	8	+10	13	Advance to knockout phase	—	3–1	2–3	1–1
2	(Portugal) Sporting CP	6	4	0	2	8	8	0	12	Advance to knockout phase	2–5	—	1–0	2–0
3	(Ukraine) Shakhtar Donetsk	6	3	0	3	11	7	+4	9	Transfer to UEFA Cup	1–2	0–1	—	5–0
4	(Switzerland) Basel	6	0	1	5	2	16	−14	1		0–5	0–1	1–2	—

Source: RSSSF

=== Group D ===
Pos	Team	Pld	W	D	L	GF	GA	GD	Pts	Qualification	LIV	ATM	MAR	PSV
1	(England) Liverpool	6	4	2	0	11	5	+6	14	Advance to knockout phase	—	1–1	1–0	3–1
2	(Spain) Atlético Madrid	6	3	3	0	9	4	+5	12	Advance to knockout phase	1–1	—	2–1	2–1
3	(France) Marseille	6	1	1	4	5	7	−2	4	Transfer to UEFA Cup	1–2	0–0	—	3–0
4	(Netherlands) PSV Eindhoven	6	1	0	5	5	14	−9	3		1–3	0–3	2–0	—

Source: RSSSF

=== Group E ===
Pos	Team	Pld	W	D	L	GF	GA	GD	Pts	Qualification	MUN	VIL	AAB	CEL
1	(England) Manchester United	6	2	4	0	9	3	+6	10	Advance to knockout phase	—	0–0	2–2	3–0
2	(Spain) Villarreal	6	2	3	1	9	7	+2	9	Advance to knockout phase	0–0	—	6–3	1–0
3	(Denmark) AaB	6	1	3	2	9	14	−5	6	Transfer to UEFA Cup	0–3	2–2	—	2–1
4	(Scotland) Celtic	6	1	2	3	4	7	−3	5		1–1	2–0	0–0	—

Source: RSSSF

=== Group F ===
Pos	Team	Pld	W	D	L	GF	GA	GD	Pts	Qualification	BAY	LYO	FIO	STE
1	(Germany) Bayern Munich	6	4	2	0	12	4	+8	14	Advance to knockout phase	—	1–1	3–0	3–0
2	(France) Lyon	6	3	2	1	14	10	+4	11	Advance to knockout phase	2–3	—	2–2	2–0
3	(Italy) Fiorentina	6	1	3	2	5	8	−3	6	Transfer to UEFA Cup	1–1	1–2	—	0–0
4	(Romania) Steaua București	6	0	1	5	3	12	−9	1		0–1	3–5	0–1	—

Source: RSSSF

=== Group G ===
Pos	Team	Pld	W	D	L	GF	GA	GD	Pts	Qualification	POR	ARS	DKV	FEN
1	(Portugal) Porto	6	4	0	2	9	8	+1	12	Advance to knockout phase	—	2–0	0–1	3–1
2	(England) Arsenal	6	3	2	1	11	5	+6	11	Advance to knockout phase	4–0	—	1–0	0–0
3	(Ukraine) Dynamo Kyiv	6	2	2	2	4	4	0	8	Transfer to UEFA Cup	1–2	1–1	—	1–0
4	(Turkey) Fenerbahçe	6	0	2	4	4	11	−7	2		1–2	2–5	0–0	—

Source: RSSSF

=== Group H ===
Pos	Team	Pld	W	D	L	GF	GA	GD	Pts	Qualification	JUV	RMA	ZEN	BATE
1	(Italy) Juventus	6	3	3	0	7	3	+4	12	Advance to knockout phase	—	2–1	1–0	0–0
2	(Spain) Real Madrid	6	4	0	2	9	5	+4	12	Advance to knockout phase	0–2	—	3–0	2–0
3	(Russia) Zenit Saint Petersburg	6	1	2	3	4	7	−3	5	Transfer to UEFA Cup	0–0	1–2	—	1–1
4	(Belarus) BATE Borisov	6	0	3	3	3	8	−5	3		2–2	0–1	0–2	—

Source: RSSSF

== Knockout phase ==
In the knockout stage, teams played against each other over two legs on a home-and-away basis, except for the one-match final. The mechanism of the draws for each round was as follows:

- In the draw for the round of 16, the eight group winners were seeded, and the eight group runners-up were unseeded. The seeded teams were drawn against the unseeded teams, with the seeded teams hosting the second leg. Teams from the same group or the same association could not be drawn against each other.
- In the draws for the quarter-finals and semi-finals, there were no seedings, and teams from the same group or the same association could be drawn against each other. As the draws for the quarter-finals and semi-finals were held together before the quarter-finals were played, the identity of the quarter-final winners was not known at the time of the semi-final draw. A draw was also held to determine which semi-final winner was designated as the "home" team for the final (for administrative purposes as it was played at a neutral venue).

=== Bracket ===
Round of 16
(France) Lyon	1	2	3
(Spain) Barcelona	1	5	6
(Portugal) Sporting CP	0	1	1
(Germany) Bayern Munich	5	7	12
(Spain) Real Madrid	0	0	0
(England) Liverpool	1	4	5
(England) Chelsea	1	2	3
(Italy) Juventus	0	2	2
(Italy) Internazionale	0	0	0
(England) Manchester United	0	2	2
(Spain) Atlético Madrid	2	0	2
(Portugal) Porto (a)	2	0	2
(Spain) Villarreal	1	2	3
(Greece) Panathinaikos	1	1	2
(England) Arsenal (p)	1	0	1 (7)
(Italy) Roma	0	1	1 (6)

Quarter-finals
(Spain) Barcelona	4	1	5
(Germany) Bayern Munich	0	1	1
(England) Liverpool	1	4	5
(England) Chelsea	3	4	7
(England) Manchester United	2	1	3
(Portugal) Porto	2	0	2
(Spain) Villarreal	1	0	1
(England) Arsenal	1	3	4

Semi-finals
(Spain) Barcelona (a)	0	1	1
(England) Chelsea	0	1	1
(England) Manchester United	1	3	4
(England) Arsenal	0	1	1

Final
27 May – Rome
(Spain) Barcelona	2
(England) Manchester United	0

=== Round of 16 ===
The draw for the round of 16 was held on 19 December 2008, and conducted by UEFA General Secretary David Taylor and Bruno Conti, the ambassador for the 2009 UEFA Champions League Final. The first legs of the round of 16 were played on 24 and 25 February 2009, while the second legs were played on 10 and 11 March.

Bayern Munich defeated Sporting CP by 12–1 on aggregate in the first knockout round; the biggest two-leg win in Champions League era. Manchester United's 2–0 victory against Internazionale in the first knockout round was their 21st consecutive undefeated match, a record surpassing Ajax's 20 undefeated matches, set between 1985–86 and 1995–96. The record was extended to 25 matches, ending with a 2–0 defeat to Barcelona in the final.

Team 1	Agg.	Team 2	1st leg	2nd leg
Chelsea (England)	3–2	(Italy) Juventus	1–0	2–2
Villarreal (Spain)	3–2	(Greece) Panathinaikos	1–1	2–1
Sporting CP (Portugal)	1–12	(Germany) Bayern Munich	0–5	1–7
Atlético Madrid (Spain)	2–2 (a)	(Portugal) Porto	2–2	0–0
Lyon (France)	3–6	(Spain) Barcelona	1–1	2–5
Real Madrid (Spain)	0–5	(England) Liverpool	0–1	0–4
Arsenal (England)	1–1 (7–6 p)	(Italy) Roma	1–0	0–1 (a.e.t.)
Internazionale (Italy)	0–2	(England) Manchester United	0–0	0–2

=== Quarter-finals ===
The draw for the quarter-finals took place in Nyon, Switzerland, on 20 March 2009. The first legs were played on 7 and 8 April while the second legs were played on 14 and 15 April. Due to the 20th anniversary of Hillsborough Disaster, Liverpool were granted their request that their return leg not be played on 15 April; the match was played on 14 April.

Porto's 1–0 loss to Manchester United in the second leg of the quarter-finals was the club's first ever home defeat to English opposition.

Team 1	Agg.	Team 2	1st leg	2nd leg
Villarreal (Spain)	1–4	(England) Arsenal	1–1	0–3
Manchester United (England)	3–2	(Portugal) Porto	2–2	1–0
Liverpool (England)	5–7	(England) Chelsea	1–3	4–4
Barcelona (Spain)	5–1	(Germany) Bayern Munich	4–0	1–1

=== Semi-finals ===
The draw for the semi-finals took place on 20 March 2009, immediately after the draw for the quarter-finals. The first legs were played on 28 and 29 April and the second legs on 5 and 6 May.

As in 2007–08, the semi-final teams consisted of three Premier League sides and Barcelona. This was the third consecutive season in which three of the four semi-final teams were English. Manchester United were the first defending champions to reach the semi-finals since the introduction of the first knockout round in the 2003–04 season. Chelsea were knocked out by Barcelona after a highly controversial performance by referee Tom Henning Øvrebø, while Arsenal's 3–1 loss to Manchester United in the second leg of the semi-finals was the club's first defeat at the Emirates Stadium in a European competition.

Team 1	Agg.	Team 2	1st leg	2nd leg
Manchester United (England)	4–1	(England) Arsenal	1–0	3–1
Barcelona (Spain)	1–1 (a)	(England) Chelsea	0–0	1–1

=== Final ===
The final was played on 27 May 2009 at the Stadio Olimpico in Rome, Italy. Barcelona won the match 2–0, with goals from Samuel Eto'o and Lionel Messi. Barcelona's victory also meant that they became the first Spanish team to win the Treble. Manchester United were the first defending champions to reach the final of the competition since Juventus in 1997, but they failed to become the first club to defend the European Cup since Milan in 1990.

27 May 2009
20:45 UTC+2

Barcelona (Spain)	2–0	(England) Manchester United
Eto'o 10'; Messi 70'	Report

Stadio Olimpico, Rome
Attendance: 62,467
Referee: Massimo Busacca (Switzerland)

== Statistics ==
Statistics exclude qualifying rounds.

=== Top goalscorers ===
Rank	Player	Team	Goals	Minutes played
1	(Argentina) Lionel Messi	(Spain) Barcelona	9	982
2	(England) Steven Gerrard	(England) Liverpool	7	580
2	(Germany) Miroslav Klose	(Germany) Bayern Munich	7	680
4	(Argentina) Lisandro López	(Portugal) Porto	6	943
5	(Togo) Emmanuel Adebayor	(England) Arsenal	5	627
5	(Italy) Alessandro Del Piero	(Italy) Juventus	5	688
5	(Ivory Coast) Didier Drogba	(England) Chelsea	5	702
5	(Netherlands) Robin van Persie	(England) Arsenal	5	716
5	(France) Thierry Henry	(Spain) Barcelona	5	717
5	(France) Karim Benzema	(France) Lyon	5	731

=== Squad of the season ===
UEFA's Technical Team selected the following 21 players for the 2008–09 UEFA Champions League Technical Team Selection.

Pos.	Player	Team
GK	(Czech Republic) Petr Čech	(England) Chelsea
GK	(Netherlands) Edwin van der Sar	(England) Manchester United
GK	(Spain) Víctor Valdés	(Spain) Barcelona
DF	(Serbia) Nemanja Vidić	(England) Manchester United
DF	(Brazil) Dani Alves	(Spain) Barcelona
DF	(England) John Terry	(England) Chelsea
DF	(Spain) Carles Puyol	(Spain) Barcelona
DF	(England) Rio Ferdinand	(England) Manchester United
DF	(Spain) Gerard Piqué	(Spain) Barcelona
MF	(England) Steven Gerrard	(England) Liverpool
MF	(Ivory Coast) Yaya Touré	(Spain) Barcelona
MF	(England) Frank Lampard	(England) Chelsea
MF	(Spain) Xavi	(Spain) Barcelona
MF	(Spain) Cesc Fàbregas	(England) Arsenal
MF	(Spain) Andrés Iniesta	(Spain) Barcelona
FW	(Spain) Fernando Torres	(England) Liverpool
FW	(France) Thierry Henry	(Spain) Barcelona
FW	(France) Franck Ribéry	(Germany) Bayern Munich
FW	(Cameroon) Samuel Eto'o	(Spain) Barcelona
FW	(Portugal) Cristiano Ronaldo	(England) Manchester United
FW	(Argentina) Lionel Messi	(Spain) Barcelona

== See also ==
- 2008–09 UEFA Cup
- 2008 UEFA Intertoto Cup
- 2009 UEFA Super Cup
- 2009 FIFA Club World Cup
- 2008–09 UEFA Women's Cup
