= 2008–09 UEFA Champions League knockout phase =

International football competition

The knockout phase of the 2008–09 UEFA Champions League began on 24 February 2009 and concluded with the final at the Stadio Olimpico in Rome on 27 May 2009. The knockout phase involved the 16 teams who finished in the top two in each of their groups in the group stage.

Times are CET/CEST, (Note: CET (UTC+1) for matches to 11 March 2009, and CEST (UTC+2) for matches from 7 April 2009.) as listed by UEFA (local times, if different, are in parentheses).

== Format ==
Each tie in the knockout phase, apart from the final, was played over two legs, with each team playing one leg at home. The team that had the higher aggregate score over the two legs progressed to the next round. In the event that aggregate scores finished level, the team that scored more goals away from home over the two legs progressed. If away goals were also equal, 30 minutes of extra time were played. If there were goals scored during extra time and the aggregate score was still level, the visiting team qualified by virtue of more away goals scored. If no goals were scored during extra time, the tie was decided via a penalty shoot-out.

The draw mechanism is as follows:

- In the draw for the first knockout round, matches were played between the winners of one group and the runners-up of a different group, with the group winner hosting the second leg. Teams from the same group or same association cannot be drawn against each other.
- From the quarter-finals onwards, these restrictions did not apply and teams from the same national association or in same group could be drawn against each other.

In the final, the tie was played over just one leg at a neutral venue. If scores were level at the end of normal time in the final, extra time was played, followed by penalties if scores remained tied.

== Qualified teams ==
Key to colours
Seeded in round of 16 draw
Unseeded in round of 16 draw

Group	Winners	Runners-up
A	(Italy) Roma	(England) Chelsea
B	(Greece) Panathinaikos	(Italy) Internazionale
C	(Spain) Barcelona	(Portugal) Sporting CP
D	(England) Liverpool	(Spain) Atlético Madrid
E	(England) Manchester United	(Spain) Villarreal
F	(Germany) Bayern Munich	(France) Lyon
G	(Portugal) Porto	(England) Arsenal
H	(Italy) Juventus	(Spain) Real Madrid

== Bracket ==
Round of 16
(France) Lyon	1	2	3
(Spain) Barcelona	1	5	6
(Portugal) Sporting CP	0	1	1
(Germany) Bayern Munich	5	7	12
(Spain) Real Madrid	0	0	0
(England) Liverpool	1	4	5
(England) Chelsea	1	2	3
(Italy) Juventus	0	2	2
(Italy) Internazionale	0	0	0
(England) Manchester United	0	2	2
(Spain) Atlético Madrid	2	0	2
(Portugal) Porto (a)	2	0	2
(Spain) Villarreal	1	2	3
(Greece) Panathinaikos	1	1	2
(England) Arsenal (p)	1	0	1 (7)
(Italy) Roma	0	1	1 (6)

Quarter-finals
(Spain) Barcelona	4	1	5
(Germany) Bayern Munich	0	1	1
(England) Liverpool	1	4	5
(England) Chelsea	3	4	7
(England) Manchester United	2	1	3
(Portugal) Porto	2	0	2
(Spain) Villarreal	1	0	1
(England) Arsenal	1	3	4

Semi-finals
(Spain) Barcelona (a)	0	1	1
(England) Chelsea	0	1	1
(England) Manchester United	1	3	4
(England) Arsenal	0	1	1

Final
27 May – Rome
(Spain) Barcelona	2
(England) Manchester United	0

== Round of 16 ==
The draw for the round of 16 was held on 19 December 2008, and conducted by UEFA General Secretary David Taylor and Bruno Conti, the ambassador for the 2009 UEFA Champions League Final.

=== Summary ===
The first legs of the round of 16 were played on 24 and 25 February 2009, while the second legs were played on 10 and 11 March.

Bayern Munich defeated Sporting CP by 12–1 on aggregate in the first knockout round; the biggest two-leg win in Champions League era. Manchester United's 2–0 victory against Internazionale in the first knockout round was their 21st consecutive undefeated match, a record surpassing Ajax's 20 undefeated matches, set between 1985–86 and 1995–96. The record was extended to 25 matches, ending with a 2–0 defeat to Barcelona in the final.

Team 1	Agg.	Team 2	1st leg	2nd leg
Chelsea (England)	3–2	(Italy) Juventus	1–0	2–2
Villarreal (Spain)	3–2	(Greece) Panathinaikos	1–1	2–1
Sporting CP (Portugal)	1–12	(Germany) Bayern Munich	0–5	1–7
Atlético Madrid (Spain)	2–2 (a)	(Portugal) Porto	2–2	0–0
Lyon (France)	3–6	(Spain) Barcelona	1–1	2–5
Real Madrid (Spain)	0–5	(England) Liverpool	0–1	0–4
Arsenal (England)	1–1 (7–6 p)	(Italy) Roma	1–0	0–1 (a.e.t.)
Internazionale (Italy)	0–2	(England) Manchester United	0–0	0–2

=== Matches ===
The knockout phase began on 24 February with four first-leg ties. English side Arsenal gained a first leg advantage with a 1–0 home victory against Roma at the Emirates Stadium, courtesy of Robin van Persie's 37th-minute penalty. The other English team in action, Manchester United, drew 0–0 with Internazionale at the San Siro, failing to score the away goal they had been hoping for. The other two matches finished in score draws, with the away sides having the upper hand going into the second legs. Lyon drew 1–1 with Barcelona at the Stade de Gerland in France, with Barcelona's Thierry Henry cancelling out an opener from Juninho. Porto came from behind twice away to Atlético Madrid to secure a 2–2 draw at the Vicente Calderón. Maxi Rodríguez put Atlético in front in the fourth minute, Lisandro López equalised in the 22nd minute, Diego Forlán scored on the stroke of half-time to restore Atlético's advantage but López levelled in the 72nd minute.

In the second set of first leg ties, played on 25 February 2009, three teams scored away goals. Bayern Munich scored five times without reply away to Sporting CP. In the match at the Estádio José Alvalade, Franck Ribéry gave the Germans the lead in the 42nd minute and Miroslav Klose doubled their advantage in the 57th. Ribéry scored again from the penalty spot in the 63rd before a brace from Luca Toni put the tie out of Sporting's reach, even before the second leg. Five-time winners Liverpool also managed an away win, against nine-time winners Real Madrid, but had to wait until the 82nd minute at the Santiago Bernabéu for it, when Yossi Benayoun scored a header from Fábio Aurélio's free-kick to hand them the advantage for the second leg. Villarreal and Panathinaikos shared a score draw at the El Madrigal, with Giuseppe Rossi scoring a 67th-minute penalty to cancel out Giorgos Karagounis' 59th-minute opener. In the other game, Chelsea beat Juventus at Stamford Bridge courtesy of a 12th-minute strike from Didier Drogba.

In the four second leg ties played on 10 March, the two English clubs in action both progressed along with Bayern Munich and Villarreal. Liverpool eliminated the nine-time European Cup winners Real Madrid with a 4–0 home victory. Fernando Torres doubled Liverpool's aggregate lead in the 16th minute, and Steven Gerrard made it 2–0 on the night with a 28th-minute penalty. Gerrard further extended Liverpool's lead two minutes after half-time and Andrea Dossena made it 5–0 on aggregate with two minutes left. Chelsea also made it through to the quarter-finals with a 2–2 draw, having won the first leg at Stamford Bridge 1–0. They fell behind to a goal from Vincenzo Iaquinta in the 19th minute but equalised through Michael Essien on the stroke of half-time. Juventus went back in front through an Alessandro Del Piero penalty, although Chelsea were heading through on the away goals ruling. Chelsea sealed their passage to the last eight when Didier Drogba equalised in the 83rd minute to win 3–2 on aggregate.

In the other games, Sporting CP departed the competition after setting a new Champions League record aggregate defeat of 12–1 to Bayern Munich. An early goal from Lukas Podolski extended Bayern's lead to 6–0 on aggregate and this was followed up by further strikes before half-time from Podolski again, Ânderson Polga (own goal) and Bastian Schweinsteiger, sandwiched by a consolation from Sporting's João Moutinho. Bayern were not finished at 4–1 as Mark van Bommel, Miroslav Klose and Thomas Müller further added to the scoreline. Villarreal were the fourth side to make it into the quarter-finals by beating Panathinaikos 3–2 overall. Ariel Ibagaza put Villarreal 2–1 up on aggregate in the 49th minute, Evangelos Mantzios equalised six minutes later, but Joseba Llorente turned the tie in Villarreal's favour in the 70th minute and the match finished 2–1 to Villarreal.

The remaining two English sides both reached the quarter-finals on 11 March and they were joined by Porto and Barcelona. Manchester United defeated Internazionale 2–0 on aggregate at Old Trafford. After a 0–0 draw at the San Siro in the first leg, United were aware that an away goal for Inter would make it difficult, but they made the perfect start with centre back Nemanja Vidić scoring with a header after four minutes. Cristiano Ronaldo doubled the lead just after half-time and the match finished 2–0. Porto and Atlético Madrid played out a 0–0 draw at the Estádio do Dragão in Portugal, but Porto went through on the away goals rule, having scored twice in a 2–2 draw in Spain. Barcelona beat Lyon 6–3 on aggregate with a 5–2 win at the Camp Nou. Thierry Henry scored twice in the space of a couple of minutes shortly before the half-hour mark to put Barcelona 3–1 up on aggregate before Lionel Messi and Samuel Eto'o made it 4–0 just before half-time on the night. Lyon scored two consolation goals through Jean Makoun on the stroke of half-time and Juninho just after the break, but Barcelona added a fifth in the final minute. In the last game to finish, Roma defeated Arsenal 1–0 at the Stadio Olimpico with Juan scoring in the ninth minute. The first match had finished 1–0 to Arsenal so the match headed into extra-time and, eventually, penalties. Arsenal emerged victorious in the shootout, winning 7–6 after Max Tonetto missed Roma's final spotkick.

25 February 2009
20:45 (19:45 UTC+0)

Chelsea (England)	1–0	(Italy) Juventus
Drogba 12'	Report

Stamford Bridge, London
Attendance: 38,079
Referee: Olegário Benquerença (Portugal)
10 March 2009
20:45

Juventus (Italy)	2–2	(England) Chelsea
Iaquinta 19'; Del Piero 74' (pen.)	Report	Essien 45+1'; Drogba 83'

Stadio Olimpico, Turin
Attendance: 27,319
Referee: Alberto Undiano Mallenco (Spain)

Chelsea won 3–2 on aggregate.

25 February 2009
20:45

Villarreal (Spain)	1–1	(Greece) Panathinaikos
Rossi 67' (pen.)	Report	Karagounis 59'

Estadio El Madrigal, Villarreal
Attendance: 21,810
Referee: Konrad Plautz (Austria)
10 March 2009
20:45 (21:45 UTC+2)

Panathinaikos (Greece)	1–2	(Spain) Villarreal
Mantzios 55'	Report	Ibagaza 49'; Llorente 70'

Olympic Stadium, Athens
Attendance: 60,616
Referee: Massimo Busacca (Switzerland)

Villarreal won 3–2 on aggregate.

25 February 2009
20:45 (19:45 UTC+0)

Sporting CP (Portugal)	0–5	(Germany) Bayern Munich
	Report	Ribéry 42', 63' (pen.); Klose 57'; Toni 84', 90+1'

Estádio José Alvalade, Lisbon
Attendance: 35,163
Referee: Bertrand Layec (France)
10 March 2009
20:45

Bayern Munich (Germany)	7–1	(Portugal) Sporting CP
Podolski 7', 34'; Polga 39' (o.g.); Schweinsteiger 43'; Van Bommel 74'; Klose 82' (pen.); Müller 90'	Report	Moutinho 42'

Allianz Arena, Munich
Attendance: 65,000
Referee: Martin Hansson (Sweden)

Bayern Munich won 12–1 on aggregate.

24 February 2009
20:45

Atlético Madrid (Spain)	2–2	(Portugal) Porto
Rodríguez 3'; Forlán 45+2'	Report	López 22', 72'

Vicente Calderón Stadium, Madrid
Attendance: 47,000
Referee: Howard Webb (England)
11 March 2009
20:45 (19:45 UTC+0)

Porto (Portugal)	0–0	(Spain) Atlético Madrid
	Report

Estádio do Dragão, Porto
Attendance: 46,509
Referee: Pieter Vink (Netherlands)

2–2 on aggregate; Porto won on away goals.

24 February 2009
20:45

Lyon (France)	1–1	(Spain) Barcelona
Juninho 7'	Report	Henry 67'

Stade de Gerland, Lyon
Attendance: 39,258
Referee: Wolfgang Stark (Germany)
11 March 2009
20:45

Barcelona (Spain)	5–2	(France) Lyon
Henry 25', 27'; Messi 40'; Eto'o 43'; Keita 90+5'	Report	Makoun 44'; Juninho 48'

Camp Nou, Barcelona
Attendance: 86,368
Referee: Tom Henning Øvrebø (Norway)

Barcelona won 6–3 on aggregate.

25 February 2009
20:45

Real Madrid (Spain)	0–1	(England) Liverpool
	Report	Benayoun 82'

Santiago Bernabéu Stadium, Madrid
Attendance: 71,579
Referee: Roberto Rosetti (Italy)
10 March 2009
20:45 (19:45 UTC+0)

Liverpool (England)	4–0	(Spain) Real Madrid
Torres 16'; Gerrard 28' (pen.), 47'; Dossena 88'	Report

Anfield, Liverpool
Attendance: 42,550
Referee: Frank De Bleeckere (Belgium)

Liverpool won 5–0 on aggregate.

24 February 2009
20:45 (19:45 UTC+0)

Arsenal (England)	1–0	(Italy) Roma
Van Persie 37' (pen.)	Report

Emirates Stadium, London
Attendance: 60,003
Referee: Claus Bo Larsen (Denmark)
11 March 2009
20:45

Roma (Italy)	1–0 (a.e.t.)	(England) Arsenal
Juan 9'	Report
Penalties
Pizarro (penalty scored); Vučinić (penalty missed); Baptista (penalty scored); Montella (penalty scored); Totti (penalty scored); Aquilani (penalty scored); Riise (penalty scored); Tonetto (penalty missed)	6–7	(penalty missed) Eduardo; (penalty scored) Van Persie; (penalty scored) Walcott; (penalty scored) Nasri; (penalty scored) Denílson; (penalty scored) Touré; (penalty scored) Sagna; (penalty scored) Diaby

Stadio Olimpico, Rome
Attendance: 62,383
Referee: Manuel Mejuto González (Spain)

1–1 on aggregate; Arsenal won 7–6 on penalties.

24 February 2009
20:45

Internazionale (Italy)	0–0	(England) Manchester United
	Report

San Siro, Milan
Attendance: 80,018
Referee: Luis Medina Cantalejo (Spain)
11 March 2009
20:45 (19:45 UTC+0)

Manchester United (England)	2–0	(Italy) Internazionale
Vidić 4'; Ronaldo 49'	Report

Old Trafford, Manchester
Attendance: 74,769
Referee: Wolfgang Stark (Germany)

Manchester United won 2–0 on aggregate.

== Quarter-finals ==
The draw for the quarter-finals took place in Nyon, Switzerland, on 20 March 2009.

=== Summary ===
The first legs were played on 7 and 8 April while the second legs were played on 14 and 15 April. Due to the 20th anniversary of Hillsborough Disaster, Liverpool were granted their request that their return leg not be played on 15 April; the match was played on 14 April.

Porto's 1–0 loss to Manchester United in the second leg of the quarter-finals was the club's first ever home defeat to English opposition.

Team 1	Agg.	Team 2	1st leg	2nd leg
Villarreal (Spain)	1–4	(England) Arsenal	1–1	0–3
Manchester United (England)	3–2	(Portugal) Porto	2–2	1–0
Liverpool (England)	5–7	(England) Chelsea	1–3	4–4
Barcelona (Spain)	5–1	(Germany) Bayern Munich	4–0	1–1

=== Matches ===
English sides Manchester United and Arsenal were involved in the first two quarter-final matches on 7 April. Arsenal were playing the first leg away against Villarreal from Spain, their second encounter in three years following on from a meeting in the semi-finals three years earlier. Villarreal went in front in the 10th minute thanks to a long-range effort from Marcos Senna. The Yellow Submarine went on to dominate the first half, but Arsenal did not concede again and their defensive work was rewarded in the 66th minute as a clipped ball from Arsenal captain Cesc Fàbregas was controlled on the chest by Emmanuel Adebayor and volleyed acrobatically with an overhead kick into the bottom corner. The match eventually finished 1–1, with Arsenal taking an away goal into the second leg.

Manchester United played their first leg at home at Old Trafford against Porto, the team who had knocked them out in the first knockout round five years before. Porto took an early lead, in the fourth minute, when Cristian Rodríguez netted past Edwin van der Sar. The advantage lasted only 11 minutes, however, at which point Wayne Rooney scored the equaliser, chipping the ball over the advancing Helton following a careless back-pass from Bruno Alves. In an open game, in which Porto dominated, another goal appeared certain but did not come until the 85th minute. Carlos Tevez saw off his marker to score from a Rooney flick from a couple of yards out. The action had not finished however and Mariano González equalised in the final minute to hand Porto a second away goal.

Liverpool and Chelsea faced each other in an all-English tie at Anfield on 8 April. The sides were meeting in the Champions League for the fifth straight season, having last faced each other in the competition in the 2008 semi-final, when Chelsea advanced to the final. Fernando Torres handed an early advantage to Liverpool, scoring in the sixth minute. However, their lead only lasted until the 39th minute when the Liverpool defence allowed Branislav Ivanović too much space at a corner and he was able to power a header past Pepe Reina. Chelsea took the lead in the 62nd minute from an almost identical situation as Ivanović scored his second headed goal. Didier Drogba added a final goal to make it 3–1 to the away side with a side-footed finish.

In the final game, played on the same evening, two of the most successful European clubs, Barcelona and Bayern Munich met at the Camp Nou in Spain. It was their first meeting since the group stage of the 1998–99 tournament. Bayern had beaten Sporting CP 12–1 in the previous round, but Barcelona posed a far tougher proposition and it showed. Lionel Messi put Barcelona in front in the ninth minute and Samuel Eto'o doubled the lead three minutes later. Messi scored his second goal in the 38th minute and Thierry Henry made it 4–0 in the 43rd minute. The score remained at 4–0 throughout the second half, leaving Barcelona as favourites to progress.

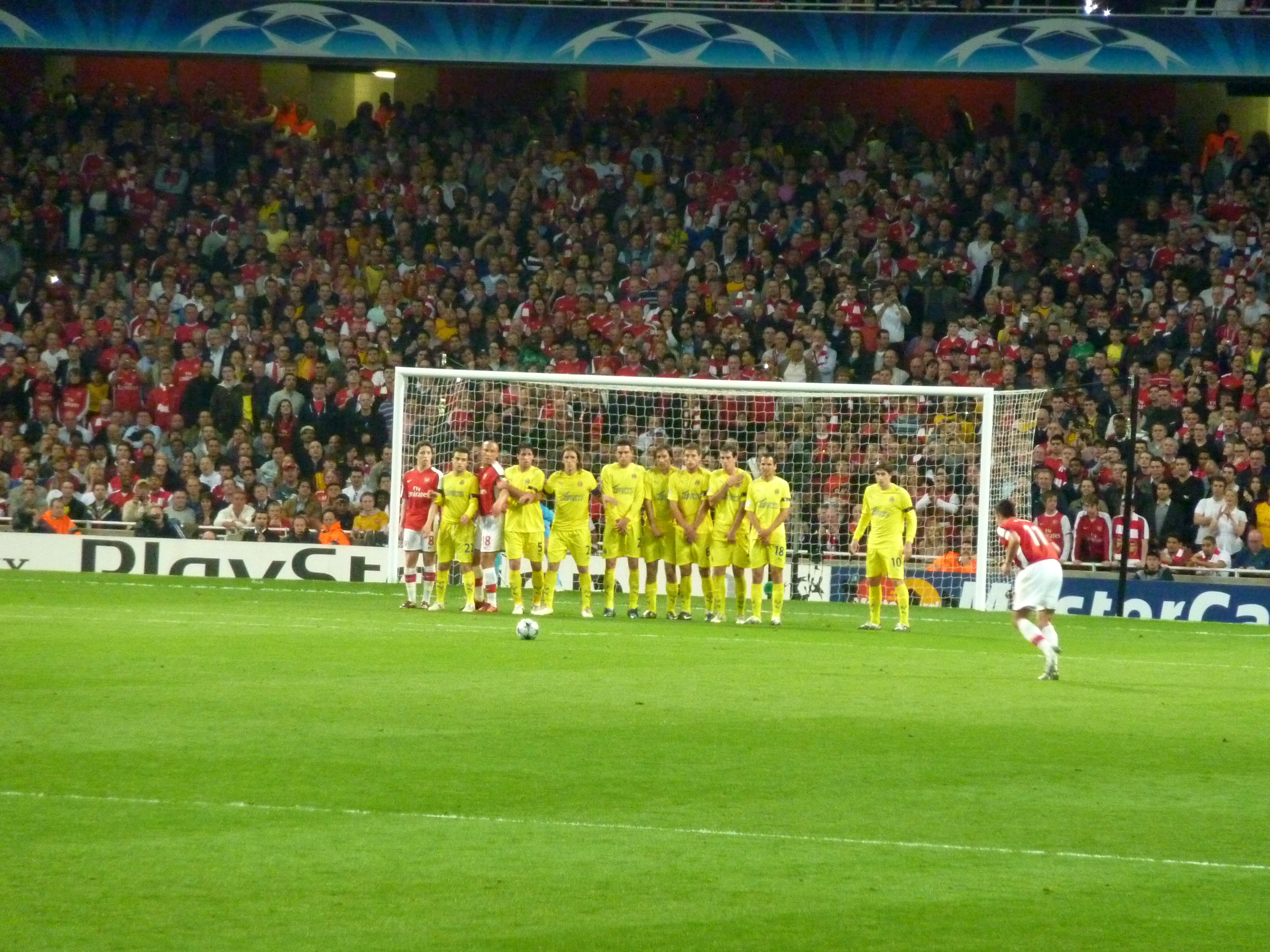
Robin van Persie takes a free kick against Villarreal.

In the first two of four second-leg ties, Chelsea came with a 3–1 advantage over Liverpool and the bonus of three away goals, Liverpool came into their match knowing they needed to score three times without conceding to progress, or win 3–1 to take the game to extra time at Stamford Bridge. Despite starting the match as outsiders, Liverpool looked to be well on the way towards their target as they took a 2–0 lead within half an hour and levelled the scores at 3–3 on aggregate. Fábio Aurélio scored directly with a free kick from the left of the penalty area in the 19th minute to hand them the lead and this was doubled nine minutes later from the penalty spot: Xabi Alonso stepped up to score following a foul on him by Branislav Ivanović. But six minutes after half-time, Didier Drogba made the score 2–1 with a shot that went through the hands of Pepe Reina, and six minutes later, Chelsea equalised to 2–2 when Alex scored with a powerful free kick. Frank Lampard put Chelsea 3–2 up in the 76th minute and, at this stage, Liverpool needed to score three goals to advance. Goals from Lucas and Dirk Kuyt in the 81st and 83rd minutes, respectively, put Liverpool 4–3 up on the night and only a goal away from advancing. However, Lampard scored again in the 89th minute to finish the tie off, and the match ended 4–4 and 7–5 to Chelsea overall.

In the other match to take place that evening, Barcelona and Bayern Munich played out a 1–1 draw at the Allianz Arena. Bayern trailed the tie 4–0 following the first match at the Camp Nou and they were able to play without fear in the first half. Luca Toni and Franck Ribéry created chances in the first half but Barcelona weathered the storm and created their only meaningful chance of the first half through Dani Alves. They managed to pull a goal back early in the second half, when Zé Roberto took the ball past defender Yaya Touré and set up Ribéry who was able to score past Víctor Valdés. But Barcelona put the tie beyond the reach of Bayern with an equaliser from Seydou Keita at the end of a 17-pass move. The match finished 1–1, giving Barcelona a 5–1 aggregate win to set up a fourth tie with Chelsea in five seasons two weeks later.

The third second-leg tie was finely poised at 1–1 between Arsenal and Villarreal at the Emirates Stadium, with Arsenal ahead courtesy of the away goals rule; Villarreal came into the match knowing they had to score. Both teams were without key players: Arsenal had to play without goalkeeper Manuel Almunia, William Gallas and Gaël Clichy while captain Marcos Senna and Santi Cazorla were missing for Villarreal. Theo Walcott delivered some dangerous crosses and Robin van Persie missed an early chance from Samir Nasri's cross, but Diego Godín also tested Arsenal goalkeeper Łukasz Fabiański with a volley. Arsenal, however, took the lead in the 10th minute as Walcott raced onto a Fàbregas through-ball and chipped the ball over Diego López. Villarreal continued to create chances, including Robert Pires nearly marking his return to his former club with a goal. Emmanuel Adebayor followed up a Van Persie free kick with a header on goal, but Gonzalo Rodríguez cleared the ball off the line. After half-time, Van Persie had a shot from distance charged down, but Arsenal did score a second goal in the 60th minute as Van Persie opted to slide a pass through to Adebayor, and his strike partner applied the finish. The tie was over in the 69th minute when Godín was adjudged to have fouled Walcott; Sebastián Eguren collected a second yellow card for his protests before Van Persie scored from the penalty spot. The match finished 3–0 to Arsenal, with Arsenal winning 4–1 on aggregate.

The final quarter-final second leg tie was between Porto and Manchester United, played simultaneously with Arsenal's match. Porto had the advantage of two away goals, after drawing 2–2 at Old Trafford. Manchester United looked to recall Rio Ferdinand from a back injury to partner Nemanja Vidić in central defence. Despite a mixed season, Cristiano Ronaldo had still scored 20 goals in all competitions and won numerous awards and he added his 21st goal with a 35-metre strike after only six minutes. Porto created very few chances, their only meaningful shot being a free kick that went wide of Edwin van der Sar's goal in the first half and later a chance for Lisandro López. United played the game at a controlled pace, but they were unable to score a second goal to settle the nerves – the threat remained that if Porto scored late, United would be knocked out. Ronaldo had a shot saved by the Porto goalkeeper Helton and Vidić missed from a couple of yards. They held on to become the first English team to win at Porto and keep their ambition of winning five trophies in the same season alive. It was United's first clean sheet in six matches and set up a semi-final with fellow English team Arsenal.

7 April 2009
20:45

Villarreal (Spain)	1–1	(England) Arsenal
Senna 10'	Report	Adebayor 66'

Estadio El Madrigal, Villarreal
Attendance: 21,577
Referee: Tom Henning Øvrebø (Norway)
15 April 2009
20:45 (19:45 UTC+1)

Arsenal (England)	3–0	(Spain) Villarreal
Walcott 10'; Adebayor 60'; Van Persie 69' (pen.)	Report

Emirates Stadium, London
Attendance: 59,233
Referee: Wolfgang Stark (Germany)

Arsenal won 4–1 on aggregate.

7 April 2009
20:45 (19:45 UTC+1)

Manchester United (England)	2–2	(Portugal) Porto
Rooney 15'; Tevez 85'	Report	Rodríguez 4'; M. González 89'

Old Trafford, Manchester
Attendance: 74,517
Referee: Konrad Plautz (Austria)
15 April 2009
20:45 (19:45 UTC+1)

Porto (Portugal)	0–1	(England) Manchester United
	Report	Ronaldo 6'

Estádio do Dragão, Porto
Attendance: 50,010
Referee: Massimo Busacca (Switzerland)

Manchester United won 3–2 on aggregate.

8 April 2009
20:45 (19:45 UTC+1)

Liverpool (England)	1–3	(England) Chelsea
Torres 6'	Report	Ivanović 39', 62'; Drogba 67'

Anfield, Liverpool
Attendance: 42,543
Referee: Claus Bo Larsen (Denmark)
14 April 2009
20:45 (19:45 UTC+1)

Chelsea (England)	4–4	(England) Liverpool
Drogba 51'; Alex 57'; Lampard 76', 89'	Report	Aurélio 19'; Alonso 28' (pen.); Lucas 81'; Kuyt 83'

Stamford Bridge, London
Attendance: 38,286
Referee: Luis Medina Cantalejo (Spain)

Chelsea won 7–5 on aggregate.

8 April 2009
20:45

Barcelona (Spain)	4–0	(Germany) Bayern Munich
Messi 9', 38'; Eto'o 12'; Henry 43'	Report

Camp Nou, Barcelona
Attendance: 93,219
Referee: Howard Webb (England)
14 April 2009
20:45

Bayern Munich (Germany)	1–1	(Spain) Barcelona
Ribéry 47'	Report	Keita 73'

Allianz Arena, Munich
Attendance: 66,000
Referee: Roberto Rosetti (Italy)

Barcelona won 5–1 on aggregate.

== Semi-finals ==
=== Summary ===
The draw for the semi-finals took place on 20 March 2009, immediately after the draw for the quarter-finals. The first legs were played on 28 and 29 April and the second legs on 5 and 6 May.

As in 2007–08, the semi-final teams consisted of three Premier League sides and Barcelona. This was the third consecutive season in which three of the four semi-final teams were English. Manchester United were the first defending champions to reach the semi-finals since the introduction of the first knockout round in the 2003–04 season. Chelsea were knocked out by Barcelona after a highly controversial performance by referee Tom Henning Øvrebø, while Arsenal's 3–1 loss to Manchester United in the second leg of the semi-finals was the club's first defeat at the Emirates Stadium in a European competition.

Team 1	Agg.	Team 2	1st leg	2nd leg
Manchester United (England)	4–1	(England) Arsenal	1–0	3–1
Barcelona (Spain)	1–1 (a)	(England) Chelsea	0–0	1–1

=== Matches ===
Although Chelsea were at home and had managed to hold Barcelona to a goalless draw at the Camp Nou in the first leg, Barcelona went into the second leg as favourites. The game started well for Chelsea and in the ninth minute Michael Essien scored a 20-yard left-footed volley after Barcelona had failed to clear a pass into the box from Frank Lampard. The first half came to a close with Chelsea leading 1–0. Despite Barcelona's domination of possession, Chelsea were the more dangerous side, especially after Eric Abidal was sent off for a foul on Nicolas Anelka. A 93rd-minute equaliser by Andrés Iniesta – which happened to be Barcelona's only shot on target in the match – saw his side reach the final.

Almost as soon as referee Tom Henning Øvrebø blew the final whistle, several Chelsea players surrounded him with complaints regarding his decisions. Some players, like Frank Lampard and Iniesta, swapped shirts, while others, such as Michael Ballack, John Terry, and Didier Drogba, continued to shout at the referee and contest him, with Drogba notably shouting, "It's a fucking disgrace" into a live television camera. Kevin McCarra writing for The Guardian described Øvrebø as "relatively inexperienced" and declared he "did not inspire any confidence whatsoever".

In the post-game analysis on Sky Sports 2, the four commentators unanimously held that of the four possible penalty appeals turned down by the referee, three of them should have been awarded, including the shirt-pulling against Didier Drogba by Eric Abidal which would have otherwise been a one-on-one against the goalkeeper, the lob over Barcelona defender Gerard Piqué that was blocked by his outstretched right hand in the 82nd minute, and the last-minute upper arm block by Eto'o. All three fouls were committed inside the penalty box. Referee Øvrebø admitted his errors in 2018 at an interview after the two teams played against each other in the 2017–18 Champions League round of 16.

29 April 2009
20:45 (19:45 UTC+1)

Manchester United (England)	1–0	(England) Arsenal
O'Shea 17'	Report

Old Trafford, Manchester
Attendance: 74,733
Referee: Claus Bo Larsen (Denmark)
5 May 2009
20:45 (19:45 UTC+1)

Arsenal (England)	1–3	(England) Manchester United
Van Persie 76' (pen.)	Report	Park Ji-sung 8'; Ronaldo 11', 61'

Emirates Stadium, London
Attendance: 59,867
Referee: Roberto Rosetti (Italy)

Manchester United won 4–1 on aggregate.

28 April 2009
20:45

Barcelona (Spain)	0–0	(England) Chelsea
	Report

Camp Nou, Barcelona
Attendance: 95,231
Referee: Wolfgang Stark (Germany)
6 May 2009
20:45 (19:45 UTC+1)

Chelsea (England)	1–1	(Spain) Barcelona
Essien 9'	Report	Iniesta 90+3'

Stamford Bridge, London
Attendance: 37,857
Referee: Tom Henning Øvrebø (Norway)

1–1 on aggregate; Barcelona won on away goals.

== Final ==
The final was played on 27 May 2009 at the Stadio Olimpico in Rome, Italy. Barcelona won the match 2–0, with goals from Samuel Eto'o and Lionel Messi. Barcelona's victory also meant that they became the first Spanish team to win the Treble. Manchester United were the first defending champions to reach the final of the competition since Juventus in 1997, but they failed to become the first club to defend the European Cup since Milan in 1990.

27 May 2009
20:45

Barcelona (Spain)	2–0	(England) Manchester United
Eto'o 10'; Messi 70'	Report

Stadio Olimpico, Rome
Attendance: 62,467
Referee: Massimo Busacca (Switzerland)
