= 2008–09 UEFA Champions League group stage =

International football competition

The 2008–09 UEFA Champions League group stage matches took place between 16 September and 10 December 2008.

== Teams ==
Seeding was determined by the UEFA coefficients: Pot 1 held teams ranked 1–10 (since Milan and Sevilla did not qualify), Pot 2 held teams ranked 11–23, Pot 3 held teams ranked 25–45, while Pot 4 held teams ranked 46–193 and unranked teams.

Clubs from the same association were paired up to split the matchdays between Tuesday and Wednesday. Clubs with the same pairing letter played on different days, ensuring that teams from the same city (e.g. Milan and Internazionale, who also share a stadium) did not play on the same day.

Group winners and runners-up advanced to the round of 16
Third-placed teams entered the UEFA Cup at the round of 32

Pot 1
| Team | Notes | Coeff. |
|---|---|---|
| (England) Manchester United | | 107.996 |
| (England) Chelsea | | 124.996 |
| (England) Liverpool | | 118.996 |
| (Spain) Barcelona | | 117.837 |
| (England) Arsenal | | 110.996 |
| (France) Lyon | | 99.380 |
| (Italy) Internazionale | | 96.934 |
| (Spain) Real Madrid | | 93.837 |

Pot 2
| Team | Notes | Coeff. |
|---|---|---|
| (Germany) Bayern Munich | | 92.078 |
| (Netherlands) PSV Eindhoven | | 91.610 |
| (Spain) Villarreal | | 90.837 |
| (Italy) Roma | | 81.934 |
| (Portugal) Porto | | 81.176 |
| (Germany) Werder Bremen | | 74.078 |
| (Portugal) Sporting CP | | 70.271 |
| (Italy) Juventus | | 66.934 |

Pot 3
| Team | Notes | Coeff. |
|---|---|---|
| (France) Marseille | | 63.380 |
| (Russia) Zenit Saint Petersburg | | 60.437 |
| (Romania) Steaua București | | 59.398 |
| (Greece) Panathinaikos | | 52.525 |
| (France) Bordeaux | | 52.380 |
| (Scotland) Celtic | | 52.013 |
| (Switzerland) Basel | | 51.993 |
| (Turkey) Fenerbahçe | | 51.469 |

Pot 4
| Team | Notes | Coeff. |
|---|---|---|
| (Ukraine) Shakhtar Donetsk | | 49.932 |
| (Italy) Fiorentina | | 40.934 |
| (Spain) Atlético Madrid | | 36.837 |
| (Ukraine) Dynamo Kyiv | | 34.932 |
| (Romania) CFR Cluj | | 13.398 |
| (Denmark) AaB | | 12.748 |
| (Cyprus) Anorthosis Famagusta | | 4.327 |
| (Belarus) BATE Borisov | | 1.760 |

Notes

1. ^{TH} Champions League title holders (automatic top seed of pot 1)
2. ^{Q3} Winners of the third qualifying round

Of the 16 teams in Pots 1 and 2, 14 eventually qualified for the first knockout round. The exceptions were Werder Bremen (to the UEFA Cup) and PSV Eindhoven (eliminated). Their places went to Panathinaikos (from Pot 3) and Atlético Madrid (from Pot 4). AaB were the lowest-ranked Pot 4 team to qualify for the UEFA Cup Round of 32.

== Tie-breaking criteria ==
Based on paragraph 6.05 in the regulations for the current season, if two or more teams were equal on points on completion of the group matches, the following criteria were applied to determine the rankings:

1. higher number of points obtained in the group matches played among the teams in question;
2. superior goal difference from the group matches played among the teams in question;
3. higher number of goals scored away from home in the group matches played among the teams in question;
4. superior goal difference from all group matches played;
5. higher number of goals scored in all group matches played;
6. higher number of coefficient points accumulated by the club in question, as well as its association, over the previous five seasons.

== Groups ==
Times are CET/CEST, (Note: CET (UTC+1) for matches from 4 November 2008, and CEST (UTC+2) for matches to 22 October 2008.) as listed by UEFA (local times, if different, are in parentheses).

=== Group A ===
| Pos | Team | Pld | W | D | L | GF | GA | GD | Pts | Qualification | ROM | CHE | BOR | CLJ |
|---|---|---|---|---|---|---|---|---|---|---|---|---|---|---|
| 1 | (Italy) Roma | 6 | 4 | 0 | 2 | 12 | 6 | +6 | 12 | Advance to knockout phase | — | 3–1 | 2–0 | 1–2 |
| 2 | (England) Chelsea | 6 | 3 | 2 | 1 | 9 | 5 | +4 | 11 | Advance to knockout phase | 1–0 | — | 4–0 | 2–1 |
| 3 | (France) Bordeaux | 6 | 2 | 1 | 3 | 5 | 11 | −6 | 7 | Transfer to UEFA Cup | 1–3 | 1–1 | — | 1–0 |
| 4 | (Romania) CFR Cluj | 6 | 1 | 1 | 4 | 5 | 9 | −4 | 4 | | 1–3 | 0–0 | 1–2 | — |

Source: RSSSF
16 September 2008
20:45 (19:45 UTC+1)

| Chelsea (England) | 4–0 | (France) Bordeaux |
|---|---|---|
| Lampard 14'; J. Cole 30'; Malouda 82'; Anelka 90+2' | Report |

Stamford Bridge, London
Attendance: 39,635
Referee: Pieter Vink (Netherlands)
16 September 2008
20:45

| Roma (Italy) | 1–2 | (Romania) CFR Cluj |
|---|---|---|
| Panucci 17' | Report | Culio 27', 49' |

Stadio Olimpico, Rome
Attendance: 25,382
Referee: Yuri Baskakov (Russia)

1 October 2008
20:45 (21:45 UTC+3)

| CFR Cluj (Romania) | 0–0 | (England) Chelsea |
|---|---|---|
| | Report |

Stadionul Dr. Constantin Rădulescu, Cluj-Napoca
Attendance: 20,320
Referee: Florian Meyer (Germany)
1 October 2008
20:45

| Bordeaux (France) | 1–3 | (Italy) Roma |
|---|---|---|
| Gourcuff 18' | Report | Vučinić 64'; Baptista 71', 83' |

Stade Chaban-Delmas, Bordeaux
Attendance: 26,920
Referee: Alberto Undiano Mallenco (Spain)

22 October 2008
20:45

| Bordeaux (France) | 1–0 | (Romania) CFR Cluj |
|---|---|---|
| Cadú 54' (o.g.) | Report |

Stade Chaban-Delmas, Bordeaux
Attendance: 26,213
Referee: Ivan Bebek (Croatia)
22 October 2008
20:45 (19:45 UTC+1)

| Chelsea (England) | 1–0 | (Italy) Roma |
|---|---|---|
| Terry 77' | Report |

Stamford Bridge, London
Attendance: 41,002
Referee: Kyros Vassaras (Greece)

4 November 2008
20:45 (21:45 UTC+2)

| CFR Cluj (Romania) | 1–2 | (France) Bordeaux |
|---|---|---|
| Dani 9' | Report | Gourcuff 6'; Wendel 38' |

Stadionul Dr. Constantin Rădulescu, Cluj-Napoca
Attendance: 19,380
Referee: Massimo Busacca (Switzerland)
4 November 2008
20:45

| Roma (Italy) | 3–1 | (England) Chelsea |
|---|---|---|
| Panucci 34'; Vučinić 48', 58' | Report | Terry 75' |

Stadio Olimpico, Rome
Attendance: 35,038
Referee: Luis Medina Cantalejo (Spain)

26 November 2008
20:45

| Bordeaux (France) | 1–1 | (England) Chelsea |
|---|---|---|
| Diarra 83' | Report | Anelka 60' |

Stade Chaban-Delmas, Bordeaux
Attendance: 32,486
Referee: Frank De Bleeckere (Belgium)
26 November 2008
20:45 (21:45 UTC+2)

| CFR Cluj (Romania) | 1–3 | (Italy) Roma |
|---|---|---|
| Y. Koné 30' | Report | Brighi 11', 64'; Totti 23' |

Stadionul Dr. Constantin Rădulescu, Cluj-Napoca
Attendance: 19,292
Referee: Lucílio Batista (Portugal)

9 December 2008
20:45 (19:45 UTC+0)

| Chelsea (England) | 2–1 | (Romania) CFR Cluj |
|---|---|---|
| Kalou 40'; Drogba 71' | Report | Y. Koné 55' |

Stamford Bridge, London
Attendance: 41,060
Referee: Peter Fröjdfeldt (Sweden)
9 December 2008
20:45

| Roma (Italy) | 2–0 | (France) Bordeaux |
|---|---|---|
| Brighi 61'; Totti 79' | Report |

Stadio Olimpico, Rome
Attendance: 38,926
Referee: Herbert Fandel (Germany)

=== Group B ===
| Pos | Team | Pld | W | D | L | GF | GA | GD | Pts | Qualification | PAN | INT | BRM | ANO |
|---|---|---|---|---|---|---|---|---|---|---|---|---|---|---|
| 1 | (Greece) Panathinaikos | 6 | 3 | 1 | 2 | 8 | 7 | +1 | 10 | Advance to knockout phase | — | 0–2 | 2–2 | 1–0 |
| 2 | (Italy) Internazionale | 6 | 2 | 2 | 2 | 8 | 7 | +1 | 8 | Advance to knockout phase | 0–1 | — | 1–1 | 1–0 |
| 3 | (Germany) Werder Bremen | 6 | 1 | 4 | 1 | 7 | 9 | −2 | 7 | Transfer to UEFA Cup | 0–3 | 2–1 | — | 0–0 |
| 4 | (Cyprus) Anorthosis Famagusta | 6 | 1 | 3 | 2 | 8 | 8 | 0 | 6 | | 3–1 | 3–3 | 2–2 | — |

Source: RSSSF
16 September 2008
20:45 (21:45 UTC+3)

| Panathinaikos (Greece) | 0–2 | (Italy) Internazionale |
|---|---|---|
| | Report | Mancini 27'; Adriano 85' |

Olympic Stadium, Athens
Attendance: 58,378
Referee: Manuel Mejuto González (Spain)
16 September 2008
20:45

| Werder Bremen (Germany) | 0–0 | (Cyprus) Anorthosis Famagusta |
|---|---|---|
| | Report |

Weserstadion, Bremen
Attendance: 34,690
Referee: Craig Thomson (Scotland)

1 October 2008
20:45 (21:45 UTC+3)

| Anorthosis Famagusta (Cyprus) | 3–1 | (Greece) Panathinaikos |
|---|---|---|
| Sarriegi 11' (o.g.); Dobrasinović 15'; Hawar M. 78' | Report | Salpingidis 28' (pen.) |

GSP Stadium, Nicosia
Attendance: 19,259
Referee: Eric Braamhaar (Netherlands)
1 October 2008
20:45

| Internazionale (Italy) | 1–1 | (Germany) Werder Bremen |
|---|---|---|
| Maicon 13' | Report | Pizarro 62' |

San Siro, Milan
Attendance: 32,965
Referee: Ľuboš Micheľ (Slovakia)

22 October 2008
20:45

| Internazionale (Italy) | 1–0 | (Cyprus) Anorthosis Famagusta |
|---|---|---|
| Adriano 44' | Report |

San Siro, Milan
Attendance: 27,247
Referee: Howard Webb (England)
22 October 2008
20:45 (21:45 UTC+3)

| Panathinaikos (Greece) | 2–2 | (Germany) Werder Bremen |
|---|---|---|
| Mantzios 36', 68' | Report | Mertesacker 29'; Almeida 82' |

Olympic Stadium, Athens
Attendance: 54,089
Referee: Mike Riley (England)

4 November 2008
20:45 (21:45 UTC+2)

| Anorthosis Famagusta (Cyprus) | 3–3 | (Italy) Internazionale |
|---|---|---|
| Bardon 31'; Panagi 45+1'; Frousos 50' | Report | Balotelli 13'; Materazzi 44'; Cruz 80' |

GSP Stadium, Nicosia
Attendance: 17,140
Referee: Laurent Duhamel (France)
4 November 2008
20:45

| Werder Bremen (Germany) | 0–3 | (Greece) Panathinaikos |
|---|---|---|
| | Report | Mantzios 58'; Karagounis 70'; Tziolis 83' |

Weserstadion, Bremen
Attendance: 35,968
Referee: Viktor Kassai (Hungary)

26 November 2008
20:45

| Internazionale (Italy) | 0–1 | (Greece) Panathinaikos |
|---|---|---|
| | Report | Sarriegi 69' |

San Siro, Milan
Attendance: 34,955
Referee: Tom Henning Øvrebø (Norway)
26 November 2008
20:45 (21:45 UTC+2)

| Anorthosis Famagusta (Cyprus) | 2–2 | (Germany) Werder Bremen |
|---|---|---|
| Nicolaou 62'; Sávio 68' | Report | Diego 72' (pen.); Almeida 87' |

GSP Stadium, Nicosia
Attendance: 18,461
Referee: Manuel Mejuto González (Spain)

9 December 2008
20:45 (21:45 UTC+2)

| Panathinaikos (Greece) | 1–0 | (Cyprus) Anorthosis Famagusta |
|---|---|---|
| Karagounis 69' | Report |

Olympic Stadium, Athens
Attendance: 59,872
Referee: Bertrand Layec (France)
9 December 2008
20:45

| Werder Bremen (Germany) | 2–1 | (Italy) Internazionale |
|---|---|---|
| Pizarro 63'; Rosenberg 81' | Report | Ibrahimović 88' |

Weserstadion, Bremen
Attendance: 35,000
Referee: Pieter Vink (Netherlands)

=== Group C ===
| Pos | Team | Pld | W | D | L | GF | GA | GD | Pts | Qualification | BAR | SPO | SHK | BSL |
|---|---|---|---|---|---|---|---|---|---|---|---|---|---|---|
| 1 | (Spain) Barcelona | 6 | 4 | 1 | 1 | 18 | 8 | +10 | 13 | Advance to knockout phase | — | 3–1 | 2–3 | 1–1 |
| 2 | (Portugal) Sporting CP | 6 | 4 | 0 | 2 | 8 | 8 | 0 | 12 | Advance to knockout phase | 2–5 | — | 1–0 | 2–0 |
| 3 | (Ukraine) Shakhtar Donetsk | 6 | 3 | 0 | 3 | 11 | 7 | +4 | 9 | Transfer to UEFA Cup | 1–2 | 0–1 | — | 5–0 |
| 4 | (Switzerland) Basel | 6 | 0 | 1 | 5 | 2 | 16 | −14 | 1 | | 0–5 | 0–1 | 1–2 | — |

Source: RSSSF
16 September 2008
20:45

| Basel (Switzerland) | 1–2 | (Ukraine) Shakhtar Donetsk |
|---|---|---|
| Abraham 90+3' | Report | Fernandinho 25'; Jádson 45+1' |

St. Jakob-Park, Basel
Attendance: 34,820
Referee: Terje Hauge (Norway)
16 September 2008
20:45

| Barcelona (Spain) | 3–1 | (Portugal) Sporting CP |
|---|---|---|
| Márquez 21'; Eto'o 60' (pen.); Xavi 87' | Report | Tonel 72' |

Camp Nou, Barcelona
Attendance: 58,354
Referee: Laurent Duhamel (France)

1 October 2008
20:45 (19:45 UTC+1)

| Sporting CP (Portugal) | 2–0 | (Switzerland) Basel |
|---|---|---|
| Romagnoli 55'; Derlei 86' | Report |

Estádio José Alvalade, Lisbon
Attendance: 22,638
Referee: Nicola Rizzoli (Italy)
1 October 2008
20:45 (21:45 UTC+3)

| Shakhtar Donetsk (Ukraine) | 1–2 | (Spain) Barcelona |
|---|---|---|
| Ilsinho 45' | Report | Messi 87', 90+4' |

RSC Olimpiyskiy, Donetsk
Attendance: 25,300
Referee: Howard Webb (England)

22 October 2008
20:45 (21:45 UTC+3)

| Shakhtar Donetsk (Ukraine) | 0–1 | (Portugal) Sporting CP |
|---|---|---|
| | Report | Liédson 76' |

RSC Olimpiyskiy, Donetsk
Attendance: 23,120
Referee: Herbert Fandel (Germany)
22 October 2008
20:45

| Basel (Switzerland) | 0–5 | (Spain) Barcelona |
|---|---|---|
| | Report | Messi 4'; Busquets 15'; Bojan 22', 46'; Xavi 48' |

St. Jakob-Park, Basel
Attendance: 37,500
Referee: Eric Braamhaar (Netherlands)

4 November 2008
20:45 (19:45 UTC+0)

| Sporting CP (Portugal) | 1–0 | (Ukraine) Shakhtar Donetsk |
|---|---|---|
| Derlei 73' | Report |

Estádio José Alvalade, Lisbon
Attendance: 24,282
Referee: Alain Hamer (Luxembourg)
4 November 2008
20:45

| Barcelona (Spain) | 1–1 | (Switzerland) Basel |
|---|---|---|
| Messi 62' | Report | Derdiyok 82' |

Camp Nou, Barcelona
Attendance: 49,479
Referee: Alexandru Tudor (Romania)

26 November 2008
20:45 (21:45 UTC+2)

| Shakhtar Donetsk (Ukraine) | 5–0 | (Switzerland) Basel |
|---|---|---|
| Jádson 32', 65', 72'; Willian 50'; Seleznyov 75' | Report |

RSC Olimpiyskiy, Donetsk
Attendance: 14,000
Referee: Kristinn Jakobsson (Iceland)
26 November 2008
20:45 (19:45 UTC+0)

| Sporting CP (Portugal) | 2–5 | (Spain) Barcelona |
|---|---|---|
| Veloso 65'; Liédson 66' | Report | Henry 14'; Piqué 17'; Messi 49'; Caneira 67' (o.g.); Bojan 73' (pen.) |

Estádio José Alvalade, Lisbon
Attendance: 31,765
Referee: Matteo Trefoloni (Italy)

9 December 2008
20:45

| Basel (Switzerland) | 0–1 | (Portugal) Sporting CP |
|---|---|---|
| | Report | Djaló 19' |

St. Jakob-Park, Basel
Attendance: 30,248
Referee: Paul Allaerts (Belgium)
9 December 2008
20:45

| Barcelona (Spain) | 2–3 | (Ukraine) Shakhtar Donetsk |
|---|---|---|
| Sylvinho 59'; Busquets 83' | Report | Hladky 31', 58'; Fernandinho 76' |

Camp Nou, Barcelona
Attendance: 22,763
Referee: Mike Riley (England)

=== Group D ===
| Pos | Team | Pld | W | D | L | GF | GA | GD | Pts | Qualification | LIV | ATM | MAR | PSV |
|---|---|---|---|---|---|---|---|---|---|---|---|---|---|---|
| 1 | (England) Liverpool | 6 | 4 | 2 | 0 | 11 | 5 | +6 | 14 | Advance to knockout phase | — | 1–1 | 1–0 | 3–1 |
| 2 | (Spain) Atlético Madrid | 6 | 3 | 3 | 0 | 9 | 4 | +5 | 12 | Advance to knockout phase | 1–1 | — | 2–1 | 2–1 |
| 3 | (France) Marseille | 6 | 1 | 1 | 4 | 5 | 7 | −2 | 4 | Transfer to UEFA Cup | 1–2 | 0–0 | — | 3–0 |
| 4 | (Netherlands) PSV Eindhoven | 6 | 1 | 0 | 5 | 5 | 14 | −9 | 3 | | 1–3 | 0–3 | 2–0 | — |

Source: RSSSF
16 September 2008
20:45

| PSV Eindhoven (Netherlands) | 0–3 | (Spain) Atlético Madrid |
|---|---|---|
| | Report | Agüero 9', 36'; Maniche 54' |

Philips Stadion, Eindhoven
Attendance: 29,000
Referee: Roberto Rosetti (Italy)
16 September 2008
20:45

| Marseille (France) | 1–2 | (England) Liverpool |
|---|---|---|
| Cana 23' | Report | Gerrard 26', 32' (pen.) |

Stade Vélodrome, Marseille
Attendance: 44,841
Referee: Konrad Plautz (Austria)

1 October 2008
20:45 (19:45 UTC+1)

| Liverpool (England) | 3–1 | (Netherlands) PSV Eindhoven |
|---|---|---|
| Kuyt 4'; Keane 34'; Gerrard 76' | Report | Koevermans 78' |

Anfield, Liverpool
Attendance: 41,097
Referee: Felix Brych (Germany)
1 October 2008
20:45

| Atlético Madrid (Spain) | 2–1 | (France) Marseille |
|---|---|---|
| Agüero 4'; R. García 22' | Report | Niang 16' |

Vicente Calderón Stadium, Madrid
Attendance: 39,898
Referee: Tom Henning Øvrebø (Norway)

22 October 2008
20:45

| Atlético Madrid (Spain) | 1–1 | (England) Liverpool |
|---|---|---|
| Simão 83' | Report | Keane 14' |

Vicente Calderón Stadium, Madrid
Attendance: 48,769
Referee: Claus Bo Larsen (Denmark)
22 October 2008
20:45

| PSV Eindhoven (Netherlands) | 2–0 | (France) Marseille |
|---|---|---|
| Koevermans 71', 85' | Report |

Philips Stadion, Eindhoven
Attendance: 29,000
Referee: Damir Skomina (Slovenia)

4 November 2008
20:45 (19:45 UTC+0)

| Liverpool (England) | 1–1 | (Spain) Atlético Madrid |
|---|---|---|
| Gerrard 90+5' (pen.) | Report | Rodríguez 37' |

Anfield, Liverpool
Attendance: 42,010
Referee: Martin Hansson (Sweden)
4 November 2008
20:45

| Marseille (France) | 3–0 | (Netherlands) PSV Eindhoven |
|---|---|---|
| Koné 30'; Niang 63', 71' | Report |

Stade Vélodrome, Marseille
Attendance: 48,777
Referee: Nicola Rizzoli (Italy)

26 November 2008
20:45

| Atlético Madrid (Spain) | 2–1 | (Netherlands) PSV Eindhoven |
|---|---|---|
| Simão 14'; Rodríguez 28' | Report | Koevermans 47' |

Vicente Calderón Stadium, Madrid
Attendance: 0 (Note: Match played behind closed doors as punishment for racist action by Atlético Madrid fans against Marseille on 1 October 2008.)
Referee: Massimo Busacca (Switzerland)
26 November 2008
20:45 (19:45 UTC+0)

| Liverpool (England) | 1–0 | (France) Marseille |
|---|---|---|
| Gerrard 23' | Report |

Anfield, Liverpool
Attendance: 40,024
Referee: Olegário Benquerença (Portugal)

9 December 2008
20:45

| PSV Eindhoven (Netherlands) | 1–3 | (England) Liverpool |
|---|---|---|
| Lazović 36' | Report | Babel 45+2'; Riera 68'; Ngog 77' |

Philips Stadion, Eindhoven
Attendance: 33,500
Referee: Nikolai Ivanov (Russia)
9 December 2008
20:45

| Marseille (France) | 0–0 | (Spain) Atlético Madrid |
|---|---|---|
| | Report |

Stade Vélodrome, Marseille
Attendance: 49,663
Referee: Wolfgang Stark (Germany)

=== Group E ===
| Pos | Team | Pld | W | D | L | GF | GA | GD | Pts | Qualification | MUN | VIL | AAB | CEL |
|---|---|---|---|---|---|---|---|---|---|---|---|---|---|---|
| 1 | (England) Manchester United | 6 | 2 | 4 | 0 | 9 | 3 | +6 | 10 | Advance to knockout phase | — | 0–0 | 2–2 | 3–0 |
| 2 | (Spain) Villarreal | 6 | 2 | 3 | 1 | 9 | 7 | +2 | 9 | Advance to knockout phase | 0–0 | — | 6–3 | 1–0 |
| 3 | (Denmark) AaB | 6 | 1 | 3 | 2 | 9 | 14 | −5 | 6 | Transfer to UEFA Cup | 0–3 | 2–2 | — | 2–1 |
| 4 | (Scotland) Celtic | 6 | 1 | 2 | 3 | 4 | 7 | −3 | 5 | | 1–1 | 2–0 | 0–0 | — |

Source: RSSSF
17 September 2008
20:45 (19:45 UTC+1)

| Manchester United (England) | 0–0 | (Spain) Villarreal |
|---|---|---|
| | Report |

Old Trafford, Manchester
Attendance: 74,944
Referee: Wolfgang Stark (Germany)
17 September 2008
20:45 (19:45 UTC+1)

| Celtic (Scotland) | 0–0 | (Denmark) AaB |
|---|---|---|
| | Report |

Celtic Park, Glasgow
Attendance: 58,754
Referee: Matteo Trefoloni (Italy)

30 September 2008
20:45

| AaB (Denmark) | 0–3 | (England) Manchester United |
|---|---|---|
| | Report | Rooney 22'; Berbatov 55', 79' |

Aalborg Stadion, Aalborg
Attendance: 10,346
Referee: Olegário Benquerença (Portugal)
30 September 2008
20:45

| Villarreal (Spain) | 1–0 | (Scotland) Celtic |
|---|---|---|
| Senna 67' | Report |

Estadio El Madrigal, Villarreal
Attendance: 21,515
Referee: Viktor Kassai (Hungary)

21 October 2008
20:45

| Villarreal (Spain) | 6–3 | (Denmark) AaB |
|---|---|---|
| Rossi 28'; Capdevila 33'; Llorente 67', 70', 84'; Pires 79' | Report | Saganowski 19'; Enevoldsen 36'; Johansson 77' |

Estadio El Madrigal, Villarreal
Attendance: 15,959
Referee: Florian Meyer (Germany)
21 October 2008
20:45 (19:45 UTC+1)

| Manchester United (England) | 3–0 | (Scotland) Celtic |
|---|---|---|
| Berbatov 30', 51'; Rooney 76' | Report |

Old Trafford, Manchester
Attendance: 74,655
Referee: Frank De Bleeckere (Belgium)

5 November 2008
20:45

| AaB (Denmark) | 2–2 | (Spain) Villarreal |
|---|---|---|
| Curth 54'; Due 81' | Report | Rossi 41'; Franco 75' |

Aalborg Stadion, Aalborg
Attendance: 10,355
Referee: Bertrand Layec (France)
5 November 2008
20:45 (19:45 UTC+0)

| Celtic (Scotland) | 1–1 | (England) Manchester United |
|---|---|---|
| McDonald 13' | Report | Giggs 84' |

Celtic Park, Glasgow
Attendance: 58,903
Referee: Tom Henning Øvrebø (Norway)

25 November 2008
20:45

| Villarreal (Spain) | 0–0 | (England) Manchester United |
|---|---|---|
| | Report |

Estadio El Madrigal, Villarreal
Attendance: 22,529
Referee: Roberto Rosetti (Italy)
25 November 2008
20:45

| AaB (Denmark) | 2–1 | (Scotland) Celtic |
|---|---|---|
| Cacá 73'; Caldwell 87' (o.g.) | Report | Robson 53' |

Aalborg Stadion, Aalborg
Attendance: 10,096
Referee: Konrad Plautz (Austria)

10 December 2008
20:45 (19:45 UTC+0)

| Manchester United (England) | 2–2 | (Denmark) AaB |
|---|---|---|
| Tevez 3'; Rooney 52' | Report | Jakobsen 31'; Curth 45+2' |

Old Trafford, Manchester
Attendance: 74,382
Referee: Laurent Duhamel (France)
10 December 2008
20:45 (19:45 UTC+0)

| Celtic (Scotland) | 2–0 | (Spain) Villarreal |
|---|---|---|
| Maloney 14'; McGeady 45+2' | Report |

Celtic Park, Glasgow
Attendance: 58,014
Referee: Claudio Circhetta (Switzerland)

=== Group F ===
| Pos | Team | Pld | W | D | L | GF | GA | GD | Pts | Qualification | BAY | LYO | FIO | STE |
|---|---|---|---|---|---|---|---|---|---|---|---|---|---|---|
| 1 | (Germany) Bayern Munich | 6 | 4 | 2 | 0 | 12 | 4 | +8 | 14 | Advance to knockout phase | — | 1–1 | 3–0 | 3–0 |
| 2 | (France) Lyon | 6 | 3 | 2 | 1 | 14 | 10 | +4 | 11 | Advance to knockout phase | 2–3 | — | 2–2 | 2–0 |
| 3 | (Italy) Fiorentina | 6 | 1 | 3 | 2 | 5 | 8 | −3 | 6 | Transfer to UEFA Cup | 1–1 | 1–2 | — | 0–0 |
| 4 | (Romania) Steaua București | 6 | 0 | 1 | 5 | 3 | 12 | −9 | 1 | | 0–1 | 3–5 | 0–1 | — |

Source: RSSSF
17 September 2008
20:45 (21:45 UTC+3)

| Steaua București (Romania) | 0–1 | (Germany) Bayern Munich |
|---|---|---|
| | Report | Van Buyten 15' |

Stadionul Steaua, Bucharest
Attendance: 13,379
Referee: Claus Bo Larsen (Denmark)
17 September 2008
20:45

| Lyon (France) | 2–2 | (Italy) Fiorentina |
|---|---|---|
| Piquionne 73'; Benzema 86' | Report | Gilardino 12', 42' |

Stade de Gerland, Lyon
Attendance: 43,000
Referee: Peter Fröjdfeldt (Sweden)

30 September 2008
20:45

| Fiorentina (Italy) | 0–0 | (Romania) Steaua București |
|---|---|---|
| | Report |

Stadio Artemio Franchi, Florence
Attendance: 25,383
Referee: Mike Riley (England)
30 September 2008
20:45

| Bayern Munich (Germany) | 1–1 | (France) Lyon |
|---|---|---|
| Zé Roberto 52' | Report | Demichelis 25' (o.g.) |

Allianz Arena, Munich
Attendance: 64,000
Referee: Kyros Vassaras (Greece)

21 October 2008
20:45

| Bayern Munich (Germany) | 3–0 | (Italy) Fiorentina |
|---|---|---|
| Klose 4'; Schweinsteiger 25'; Zé Roberto 90' | Report |

Allianz Arena, Munich
Attendance: 66,000
Referee: Olegário Benquerença (Portugal)
21 October 2008
20:45 (21:45 UTC+3)

| Steaua București (Romania) | 3–5 | (France) Lyon |
|---|---|---|
| Arthuro 8'; Goian 11'; Petre 45' | Report | Keïta 23'; Benzema 33', 71'; Fred 69', 90+2' |

Stadionul Steaua, Bucharest
Attendance: 15,239
Referee: Grzegorz Gilewski (Poland)

5 November 2008
20:45

| Fiorentina (Italy) | 1–1 | (Germany) Bayern Munich |
|---|---|---|
| Mutu 11' | Report | Borowski 78' |

Stadio Artemio Franchi, Florence
Attendance: 37,034
Referee: Alberto Undiano Mallenco (Spain)
5 November 2008
20:45

| Lyon (France) | 2–0 | (Romania) Steaua București |
|---|---|---|
| Juninho 44'; Réveillère 89' | Report |

Stade de Gerland, Lyon
Attendance: 37,243
Referee: Manuel Mejuto González (Spain)

25 November 2008
20:45

| Bayern Munich (Germany) | 3–0 | (Romania) Steaua București |
|---|---|---|
| Klose 57', 71'; Toni 61' | Report |

Allianz Arena, Munich
Attendance: 64,000
Referee: Eric Braamhaar (Netherlands)
25 November 2008
20:45

| Fiorentina (Italy) | 1–2 | (France) Lyon |
|---|---|---|
| Gilardino 45' | Report | Makoun 15'; Benzema 27' |

Stadio Artemio Franchi, Florence
Attendance: 23,736
Referee: Viktor Kassai (Hungary)

10 December 2008
20:45 (21:45 UTC+2)

| Steaua București (Romania) | 0–1 | (Italy) Fiorentina |
|---|---|---|
| | Report | Gilardino 66' |

Stadionul Steaua, Bucharest
Attendance: 14,862
Referee: Luis Medina Cantalejo (Spain)
10 December 2008
20:45

| Lyon (France) | 2–3 | (Germany) Bayern Munich |
|---|---|---|
| Govou 52'; Benzema 68' | Report | Klose 11', 37'; Ribéry 34' |

Stade de Gerland, Lyon
Attendance: 38,349
Referee: Howard Webb (England)

=== Group G ===
| Pos | Team | Pld | W | D | L | GF | GA | GD | Pts | Qualification | POR | ARS | DKV | FEN |
|---|---|---|---|---|---|---|---|---|---|---|---|---|---|---|
| 1 | (Portugal) Porto | 6 | 4 | 0 | 2 | 9 | 8 | +1 | 12 | Advance to knockout phase | — | 2–0 | 0–1 | 3–1 |
| 2 | (England) Arsenal | 6 | 3 | 2 | 1 | 11 | 5 | +6 | 11 | Advance to knockout phase | 4–0 | — | 1–0 | 0–0 |
| 3 | (Ukraine) Dynamo Kyiv | 6 | 2 | 2 | 2 | 4 | 4 | 0 | 8 | Transfer to UEFA Cup | 1–2 | 1–1 | — | 1–0 |
| 4 | (Turkey) Fenerbahçe | 6 | 0 | 2 | 4 | 4 | 11 | −7 | 2 | | 1–2 | 2–5 | 0–0 | — |

Source: RSSSF
17 September 2008
20:45 (19:45 UTC+1)

| Porto (Portugal) | 3–1 | (Turkey) Fenerbahçe |
|---|---|---|
| López 10'; L. González 13'; Lino 90+2' | Report | Güiza 29' |

Estádio do Dragão, Porto
Attendance: 38,709
Referee: Bertrand Layec (France)
17 September 2008
20:45 (21:45 UTC+3)

| Dynamo Kyiv (Ukraine) | 1–1 | (England) Arsenal |
|---|---|---|
| Bangoura 64' (pen.) | Report | Gallas 88' |

Valeriy Lobanovskyi Dynamo Stadium, Kyiv
Attendance: 16,800
Referee: Luis Medina Cantalejo (Spain)

30 September 2008
20:45 (19:45 UTC+1)

| Arsenal (England) | 4–0 | (Portugal) Porto |
|---|---|---|
| Van Persie 31', 48'; Adebayor 40', 71' (pen.) | Report |

Emirates Stadium, London
Attendance: 59,623
Referee: Herbert Fandel (Germany)
30 September 2008
20:45 (21:45 UTC+3)

| Fenerbahçe (Turkey) | 0–0 | (Ukraine) Dynamo Kyiv |
|---|---|---|
| | Report |

Şükrü Saracoğlu Stadium, Istanbul
Attendance: 35,112
Referee: Thomas Einwaller (Austria)

21 October 2008
20:45 (21:45 UTC+3)

| Fenerbahçe (Turkey) | 2–5 | (England) Arsenal |
|---|---|---|
| Silvestre 19' (o.g.); Güiza 78' | Report | Adebayor 10'; Walcott 11'; Diaby 22'; Song 49'; Ramsey 90+4' |

Şükrü Saracoğlu Stadium, Istanbul
Attendance: 42,619
Referee: Peter Fröjdfeldt (Sweden)
21 October 2008
20:45 (19:45 UTC+1)

| Porto (Portugal) | 0–1 | (Ukraine) Dynamo Kyiv |
|---|---|---|
| | Report | Aliyev 27' |

Estádio do Dragão, Porto
Attendance: 32,209
Referee: Terje Hauge (Norway)

5 November 2008
20:45 (19:45 UTC+0)

| Arsenal (England) | 0–0 | (Turkey) Fenerbahçe |
|---|---|---|
| | Report |

Emirates Stadium, London
Attendance: 60,003
Referee: Roberto Rosetti (Italy)
5 November 2008
20:45 (21:45 UTC+2)

| Dynamo Kyiv (Ukraine) | 1–2 | (Portugal) Porto |
|---|---|---|
| Milevskyi 21' | Report | Rolando 69'; L. González 90+2' |

Valeriy Lobanovskyi Dynamo Stadium, Kyiv
Attendance: 16,300
Referee: Konrad Plautz (Austria)

25 November 2008
20:45 (21:45 UTC+2)

| Fenerbahçe (Turkey) | 1–2 | (Portugal) Porto |
|---|---|---|
| Kazim-Richards 63' | Report | López 19', 28' |

Şükrü Saracoğlu Stadium, Istanbul
Attendance: 38,120
Referee: Alberto Undiano Mallenco (Spain)
25 November 2008
20:45 (19:45 UTC+0)

| Arsenal (England) | 1–0 | (Ukraine) Dynamo Kyiv |
|---|---|---|
| Bendtner 87' | Report |

Emirates Stadium, London
Attendance: 59,374
Referee: Alain Hamer (Luxembourg)

10 December 2008
20:45 (19:45 UTC+0)

| Porto (Portugal) | 2–0 | (England) Arsenal |
|---|---|---|
| Alves 39'; López 54' | Report |

Estádio do Dragão, Porto
Attendance: 37,602
Referee: Kyros Vassaras (Greece)
10 December 2008
20:45 (21:45 UTC+2)

| Dynamo Kyiv (Ukraine) | 1–0 | (Turkey) Fenerbahçe |
|---|---|---|
| Eremenko 20' | Report |

Valeriy Lobanovskyi Dynamo Stadium, Kyiv
Attendance: 14,000
Referee: Florian Meyer (Germany)

=== Group H ===
| Pos | Team | Pld | W | D | L | GF | GA | GD | Pts | Qualification | JUV | RMA | ZEN | BATE |
|---|---|---|---|---|---|---|---|---|---|---|---|---|---|---|
| 1 | (Italy) Juventus | 6 | 3 | 3 | 0 | 7 | 3 | +4 | 12 | Advance to knockout phase | — | 2–1 | 1–0 | 0–0 |
| 2 | (Spain) Real Madrid | 6 | 4 | 0 | 2 | 9 | 5 | +4 | 12 | Advance to knockout phase | 0–2 | — | 3–0 | 2–0 |
| 3 | (Russia) Zenit Saint Petersburg | 6 | 1 | 2 | 3 | 4 | 7 | −3 | 5 | Transfer to UEFA Cup | 0–0 | 1–2 | — | 1–1 |
| 4 | (Belarus) BATE Borisov | 6 | 0 | 3 | 3 | 3 | 8 | −5 | 3 | | 2–2 | 0–1 | 0–2 | — |

Source: RSSSF
17 September 2008
20:45

| Juventus (Italy) | 1–0 | (Russia) Zenit Saint Petersburg |
|---|---|---|
| Del Piero 76' | Report |

Stadio Olimpico, Turin
Attendance: 20,853
Referee: Frank De Bleeckere (Belgium)
17 September 2008
20:45

| Real Madrid (Spain) | 2–0 | (Belarus) BATE Borisov |
|---|---|---|
| Ramos 11'; Van Nistelrooy 57' | Report |

Santiago Bernabéu Stadium, Madrid
Attendance: 55,099
Referee: Alain Hamer (Luxembourg)

30 September 2008
18:30 (20:30 UTC+4)

| Zenit Saint Petersburg (Russia) | 1–2 | (Spain) Real Madrid |
|---|---|---|
| Danny 25' | Report | Hubočan 4' (o.g.); Van Nistelrooy 31' |

Petrovsky Stadium, Saint Petersburg
Attendance: 21,075
Referee: Massimo Busacca (Switzerland)
30 September 2008
20:45 (21:45 UTC+3)

| BATE Borisov (Belarus) | 2–2 | (Italy) Juventus |
|---|---|---|
| Kryvets 17'; Stasevich 23' | Report | Iaquinta 29', 45+3' |

Dinamo Stadium, Minsk
Attendance: 31,400
Referee: Martin Atkinson (England)

21 October 2008
18:30 (20:30 UTC+4)

| Zenit Saint Petersburg (Russia) | 1–1 | (Belarus) BATE Borisov |
|---|---|---|
| Tekke 80' | Report | Nyakhaychyk 52' |

Petrovsky Stadium, Saint Petersburg
Attendance: 19,500
Referee: Pedro Proença (Portugal)
21 October 2008
20:45

| Juventus (Italy) | 2–1 | (Spain) Real Madrid |
|---|---|---|
| Del Piero 5'; Amauri 49' | Report | Van Nistelrooy 66' |

Stadio Olimpico, Turin
Attendance: 25,813
Referee: Wolfgang Stark (Germany)

5 November 2008
20:45 (21:45 UTC+2)

| BATE Borisov (Belarus) | 0–2 | (Russia) Zenit Saint Petersburg |
|---|---|---|
| | Report | Pogrebnyak 34'; Danny 90+4' |

Dinamo Stadium, Minsk
Attendance: 28,793
Referee: Stéphane Lannoy (France)
5 November 2008
20:45

| Real Madrid (Spain) | 0–2 | (Italy) Juventus |
|---|---|---|
| | Report | Del Piero 17', 67' |

Santiago Bernabéu Stadium, Madrid
Attendance: 71,560
Referee: Pieter Vink (Netherlands)

25 November 2008
18:30 (20:30 UTC+3)

| Zenit Saint Petersburg (Russia) | 0–0 | (Italy) Juventus |
|---|---|---|
| | Report |

Petrovsky Stadium, Saint Petersburg
Attendance: 20,155
Referee: Claus Bo Larsen (Denmark)
25 November 2008
20:45 (21:45 UTC+2)

| BATE Borisov (Belarus) | 0–1 | (Spain) Real Madrid |
|---|---|---|
| | Report | Raúl 7' |

Dinamo Stadium, Minsk
Attendance: 30,500
Referee: Terje Hauge (Norway)

10 December 2008
20:45

| Juventus (Italy) | 0–0 | (Belarus) BATE Borisov |
|---|---|---|
| | Report |

Stadio Olimpico, Turin
Attendance: 5,753
Referee: Costas Kapitanis (Cyprus)
10 December 2008
20:45

| Real Madrid (Spain) | 3–0 | (Russia) Zenit Saint Petersburg |
|---|---|---|
| Raúl 25', 57'; Robben 50' | Report |

Santiago Bernabéu Stadium, Madrid
Attendance: 46,265
Referee: Jonas Eriksson (Sweden)
