= Claus Bo Larsen =

Danish football referee

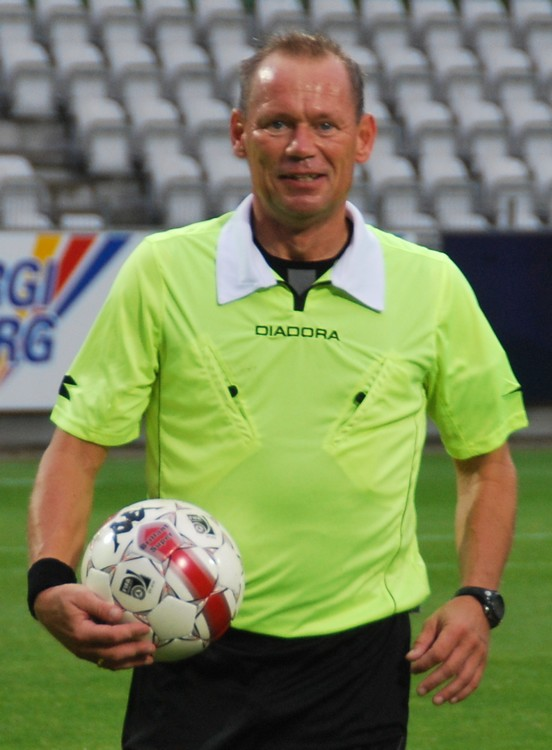
- Born: 28 October 1965 (age 60); Odense, Denmark
- Other occupation: Customs clearance manager

International
Years	League	Role
1996–2010	UEFA	Referee

Claus Bo Larsen (born 28 October 1965) is a Danish former football referee who officiates in the Danish Superliga and was FIFA-listed from 1996 to 2010. He has officiated numerous matches in the UEFA Europa League and Champions League. Larsen is classified as a FIFA Top Class Referee, which is the highest level of referees. He is well known for his down-to-earth appearance on the field, preferring to control the game with a good personality rather than cautioning the players.

== Early career ==
He earned his license to officiate at an age of 16 in 1981. In 1988, he was appointed as a referee in the Denmark Series which is the 4th tier of football in Denmark. By 1994 he had made his way to the highest Danish league – The Superliga. In 1996, he was appointed FIFA-referee.

== International highlights ==
- 2004: Summer Olympics in Athens
- 2005: On 12 November 2005, Larsen officiated the 1st leg of the 2006 FIFA World Cup Qualification Playoffs between Uruguay and Australia.
- 2008: He was appointed to officiate the Final of the 2008 UEFA Super Cup between Zenit St Petersburg and Manchester United played in Monaco on Friday, 29 August 2008. He was assisted by Henrik Sønderby and Anders Nørrestrand, with Nicolai Vollquartz acting as Fourth official
- 2010: He refereed in the 2009–10 UEFA Europa League semifinal contested by Hamburger SV and Fulham played in Hamburg on Thursday, 22 April 2010.

He was not a part of the squad of referees to go the 2010 FIFA World Cup, even though he refereed both the 2009 Champions League quarter-final between Liverpool F.C. and Chelsea FC and the 2009 Champions League semifinal between Manchester United and Arsenal FC. His final international appearance was in the Champions League match between AC Milan and Ajax (0–2) on Wednesday, 8 December 2010.
