= 2008–09 Anorthosis Famagusta FC season =

Anorthosis Famagusta
2008–09 season
- Chairman: Andreas Panteli (until December 2008); Chris Georgiades (from January 2009)
- Manager: Temur Ketsbaia; Michalis Pamboris
- Cypriot First Division: 3rd
- Cypriot Cup: Second round
- LTV Super Cup: Runners-up
- Champions League: Group stage
- Top goalscorer: League: Sosin (10 goals); All: Sosin (14 goals)
- Highest home attendance: 19,259 vs Panathinaikos (1 October 2008)
- Lowest home attendance: 6,050 vs Atromitos (31 November 2008)

The 2008–09 season (started 19 June 2008) is Anorthosis' 60th consecutive season in the Cypriot First Division. The team finished 1st in the league in the previous season so it will represent Cyprus in the Champions League. The first training session for the season took take place at the training ground at Antonis Papadopoulos Stadium on June 18, 2008. On August 27, 2008, they became the first Cypriot football club to reach the group stages of the Champions League, defeating Olympiacos of Greece in the third qualifying round.

In December 2008, Andreas Panteli, the chairman of the company since 2004, resigned and he was replaced by Chris Georgiades. Manager Temuri Ketsbaia left the club by mutual consent in April 2009 and was replaced by Michalis Pamboris as caretaker.

== Current squad ==
Last Update: 14 February 2009

Note: Flags indicate national team as defined under FIFA eligibility rules; some limited exceptions apply. Players may hold more than one non-FIFA nationality.

No.	Pos.	Nation	Player
1	GK	ALB	Arjan Beqaj
3	DF	CYP	Lambros Lambrou
4	DF	GRE	Nikos Katsavakis
5	MF	CYP	Nikos Nicolaou (captain)
6	MF	MNE	Siniša Dobrašinović
8	MF	GRE	Giannis Skopelitis
9	FW	POL	Łukasz Sosin
11	FW	GRE	Nikolaos Frousos
12	DF	NED	Jeffrey Leiwakabessy
16	FW	GEO	Klimenti Tsitaishvili
17	MF	BRA	Sávio
18	MF	ROU	Eugen Trică
19	FW	IRQ	Hawar Taher
20	MF	FRA	Vincent Laban

No.	Pos.	Nation	Player
21	MF	CYP	Giorgos Panagi
22	DF	SRB	Predrag Ocokoljić
23	DF	CYP	Constantinos Samaras
24	DF	CYP	Andreas Constantinou
26	FW	CYP	Chrysovalantis Panayiotou
27	MF	FRA	Cédric Bardon
28	DF	GRE	Georgios Georgiou
30	GK	HUN	Zoltán Nagy
31	GK	CYP	Demetris Leoni
32	GK	CYP	Gavriel Constantinou
33	DF	GRE	Traianos Dellas
67	DF	CYP	Giorgos Theodotou
70	FW	CYP	Giorgos Tofas
80	MF	CYP	Alexandros Garpozis

=== Transfers ===
==== Summer ====
In Note: Flags indicate national team as defined under FIFA eligibility rules; some limited exceptions apply. Players may hold more than one non-FIFA nationality.

No.	Pos.	Nation	Player
—	DF	SRB	Predrag Ocokoljić (from (Cyprus) AEL Limassol)
—	MF	GRE	Giannis Skopelitis (from (Greece) Atromitos)
—	MF	CYP	Stefanos Voskaridis (from (Greece) Kallithea)
—	MF	POR	Tiquinho (from (Cyprus) AEL Limassol)
—	MF	MNE	Siniša Dobrašinović (from (Cyprus) Omonia Nicosia)
—	DF	CYP	Giorgos Theodotou (from (Cyprus) Omonia Nicosia)
—	DF	GRE	Georgios Georgiou (from (Greece) Atromitos)
—	DF	NED	Jeffrey Leiwakabessy (from (Germany) Alemannia Aachen)
—	MF	FRA	Cédric Bardon (from (Israel) Bnei Yehuda)
—	DF	GRE	Traianos Dellas (from (Greece) AEK Athens)
—	MF	BRA	Sávio (from (Brazil) Desportiva)
—	MF	IRQ	Hawar Taher (from (Qatar) Al-Khor)

Out Note: Flags indicate national team as defined under FIFA eligibility rules; some limited exceptions apply. Players may hold more than one non-FIFA nationality.

No.	Pos.	Nation	Player
—	DF	GRE	Savvas Poursaitidis (to (Cyprus) APOEL)
—	MF	SVN	Anton Žlogar (to (Cyprus) Omonia Nicosia)
—	DF	RWA	Hamad Ndikumana (to (Cyprus) Omonia Nicosia)
—	DF	EGY	Amir Azmy (to (Turkey) Hacettepe)
—	MF	BRA	William Boaventura (to (Ukraine) Metalurh Donetsk)
—	DF	CYP	Loukas Louka (to (Cyprus) Alki Larnaca)
—	MF	BUL	Metodi Deyanov (released)
—	FW	SRB	Milan Belić (to (Cyprus) A.E. Paphos)
—	DF	GRE	Theodoros Tripotseris (to (Greece) Levadiakos)

==== Winter ====
In: Note: Flags indicate national team as defined under FIFA eligibility rules; some limited exceptions apply. Players may hold more than one non-FIFA nationality.

No.	Pos.	Nation	Player
—	MF	ROU	Eugen Trică (from (Romania) CFR Cluj)
—	GK	CYP	Demetris Leoni (from (Cyprus) A.E. Paphos)
—	MF	CYP	Alexandros Garpozis (from (Cyprus) Apollon Limassol)
—	FW	CYP	Giorgos Tofas (on loan from (Greece) AEK Athens)

Out: Note: Flags indicate national team as defined under FIFA eligibility rules; some limited exceptions apply. Players may hold more than one non-FIFA nationality.

No.	Pos.	Nation	Player
—	MF	POR	Tiquinho (to (Cyprus) AEK Larnaca)
—	MF	POR	Paulo Costa (on loan to (Cyprus) APOEL)
—	FW	CYP	Stefanos Voskaridis (on loan to (Cyprus) Enosis Neon Paralimni)

=== Foreign players ===
Teams in the Cypriot First Division can register up to eighteen non-EU nationals and players with European ancestry.

EU Nationals

- (France) (European Union) Vincent Laban
- (France) (European Union) Cédric Bardon
- (Greece) (European Union) Nikos Katsavakis
- (Greece) (European Union) Giannis Skopelitis
- (Greece) (European Union) Nikolaos Frousos
- (Greece) (European Union) Traianos Dellas
- (Greece) (European Union) Georgios Georgiou
- (Hungary) (European Union) Zoltán Nagy
- (Poland) (European Union) Łukasz Sosin
- (Romania) (European Union) Eugen Trică
- (Netherlands) (Indonesia) (European Union) Jeffrey Leiwakabessy

EU Nationals (Dual citizenship)

- (Brazil) (France) Sávio

Non-EU Nationals

- (Albania) Arjan Beqaj
- (Georgia (country)) Klimenti Tsitaishvili
- (Iraq) Hawar Taher
- (Montenegro) (Serbia) Siniša Dobrašinović
- (Serbia) Predrag Ocokoljić

=== International players ===
- (Cyprus) Lambros Lambrou
- (Cyprus) Nikos Nicolaou
- (Cyprus) Giorgos Panagi
- (Cyprus) Andreas Constantinou
- (Cyprus) Giorgos Theodotou
- (Cyprus) Demetris Leoni
- (Cyprus) Alexandros Garpozis
- (Albania) Arjan Beqaj
- (Brazil) Sávio
- (Greece) Nikolaos Frousos
- (Greece) Traianos Dellas
- (Romania) Eugen Trică
- (Poland) Łukasz Sosin
- (Serbia) Predrag Ocokoljić
- (Iraq) Hawar Taher

== Club ==
=== Management ===
Position	Staff
Manager	(Cyprus) Michalis Pamboris
Assistant manager	(Cyprus) Nikos Nicolaou
Fitness coach	(Cyprus) Michalis Michael
Goalkeeping coach	(Cyprus) Michalis Pamboris
Team doctor	(Cyprus) Sergios Sergiou

Last updated: 16 Apr 2008
Source: anorthosisfc.com

=== Kit ===
Supplier: Puma
Sponsor(s): Quality Group

Home	Away	Third Colours

Source: anorthosisfc.com

=== Other information ===
Chairman	(Cyprus) Andreas Panteli (until December 2008) (Cyprus) Chris Georgiades (from January 2009)
Ground (capacity and dimensions)	Antonis Papadopoulos Stadium (9,782 / 105x70 m)

Source: anorthosisfc.com

== Competitions ==
=== Marfin Laiki League ===
==== Classification ====
Pos	Team	Pld	W	D	L	GF	GA	GD	Pts	Qualification or relegation
1	APOEL	26	22	3	1	53	14	+39	69	Qualification for second round, Group A
2	Omonia Nicosia	26	21	1	4	61	18	+43	64	Qualification for second round, Group A
3	Anorthosis Famagusta	26	20	2	4	49	19	+30	62	Qualification for second round, Group A
4	AEL Limassol	26	13	4	9	34	30	+4	43 (Note: AEL 1–0 APOL; APOL 1–3 AEL)	Qualification for second round, Group A
5	Apollon Limassol	26	13	4	9	53	34	+19	43	Qualification for second round, Group B

Source: cfa.com.cy (in Greek)
Rules for classification: 1) points; 2) head-to-head points; 3) head-to-head goal difference; 4) head-to-head goals scored; 5) goal difference; 6) number of goals scored.
Teams qualified for Group A played out one spot in the second qualifying round of the UEFA Champions League and two spots in the UEFA Europa League, one in the second and one in the first qualifying round.
A spot in the third qualifying round of UEFA Europa League was awarded to the winners of the 2008–09 Cypriot Cup.
Teams qualified for Group C played out one additional relegation spot.
Points gained in the First round were taken over into the Second round groups.

==== Results by round ====
Round	1	2	3	4	5	6	7	8	9	10	11	12	13	14	15	16	17	18	19	20	21	22	23	24	25	26	27	28	29	30	31	32
Ground	H	A	H	A	H	A	H	A	H	A	H	A	H	A	H	A	H	A	H	A	H	A	H	A	H	A	H	H	A	H	A	A
Result	W	W	W	W	D	L	W	W	W	W	W	L	W	W	W	W	W	D	L	W	W	W	W	W	L	W	L	W	L	D	L	D

Updated to match(es) played on May 9, 2009. Source: anorthosisfc.com
A = Away; H = Home; W = Win; D = Draw; L = Loss

==== Playoffs table ====
The first 12 teams are divided into three groups. Points are carried over from the first round.

Pos	Team	Pld	W	D	L	GF	GA	GD	Pts	Qualification
1	APOEL (C)	32	26	4	2	62	17	+45	82	Qualification for Champions League second qualifying round
2	Omonia Nicosia	32	25	1	6	70	22	+48	76	Qualification for Europa League second qualifying round
3	Anorthosis Famagusta	32	21	4	7	52	26	+26	67	Qualification for Europa League first qualifying round
4	AEL Limassol	32	13	5	14	38	41	−3	44	

Source: cfa.com.cy (in Greek)
Rules for classification: 1) points; 2) head-to-head points; 3) head-to-head goal difference; 4) head-to-head goals scored; 5) goal difference; 6) number of goals scored.
(C) Champions

== Matches ==
=== Pre-season and friendlies ===
Anorthosis left on 25 June for Amsterdam, Netherlands, and Golden Tulip Victoria athletic centre to perform most of their pre-season training. The team returned on 9 July. While in Netherlands Anorthosis played four friendly matches.

2008-07-01

Metalurh Donetsk (Ukraine)	1–0	(Cyprus) Anorthosis
	(Report)

Amsterdam, Netherlands

2008-07-03

Anorthosis (Cyprus)	1–0	(Israel) Beitar Jerusalem
Own goal 50'	(Report)

Amsterdam, Netherlands

2008-07-05

Bochum (Germany)	1–2	(Cyprus) Anorthosis
Dabrowski (pen) 72'	(Report)	Sosin 33', Tiquinho 73'

Stadion im Sportpark Wanne-Süd, Germany
Referee: Thomas Metzen

2008-07-07

Anorthosis (Cyprus)	0–0	(Romania) Farul Constanţa
	(Report)

Amsterdam, Netherlands

2008-07-11

Ethnikos Achnas (Cyprus)	3–3	(Cyprus) Anorthosis
Alekou 35', Stjepanović 35', Janković 51'	(Report)	Sosin 43', Nicolaou 80', Tripotseris 90'

Dasaki Stadium, Achna

2008-08-09

Alki Larnaca (Cyprus)	0–0	(Cyprus) Anorthosis
	(Report)

Ammochostos Stadium, Larnaca

2008-08-16

Anorthosis (Cyprus)	2–1	(Cyprus) AEK Larnaca
Tsitaishvili 25', Frousos 33'	(Report)	Adorno 73'

Antonis Papadopoulos Stadium, Larnaca
Attendance: 3,000

2008-09-05

Enosis Neon Paralimni (Cyprus)	0–0	(Cyprus) Anorthosis
	(Report)

Paralimni Stadium, Paralimni

=== LTV Super Cup ===
Time at EET

2008-08-23
20:00

Anorthosis	0–1	APOEL
	(Report)	Kosowski 23'

GSP Stadium, Nicosia
Attendance: 4,585
Referee: Stelios Trifonos

==== Regular season ====
Time at EET

2008-09-01
20:00

Anorthosis	3–0	APEP Pitsilias
Sosin 46' (pen.); Sávio 52'; Dobra 90'	(Report)

Antonis Papadopoulos Stadium, Larnaca
Attendance: 8.000
Referee: Panikos Kailis

2008-09-12
19:30

Doxa	0–1	Anorthosis
	(Report)	Sosin 83'

Makario Stadium, Nicosia
Attendance: 2.001
Referee: Giannis Anastasiou

2008-09-20
20:00

Anorthosis	2–1	Ethnikos Achnas
Dobra 25'; Leiwakabessy 52'	(Report)	Schlichting 35'

Antonis Papadopoulos Stadium, Larnaca
Attendance: 8.000
Referee: Stelios Trifonos

2008-09-27
20:00

AEL	0–2	Anorthosis
	(Report)	Sosin 71'; Dellas 81'

Tsirion Stadium, Limassol
Attendance: 6.645
Referee: Marios Tsangaris

2008-10-19
19:00

Anorthosis	0–0	AEP Paphos
	(Report)

Antonis Papadopoulos Stadium, Larnaca
Attendance: 6.500
Referee: Demetris Crysostomou

2008-10-27
19:00

Omonia	4–0	Anorthosis
Žlogar 24'; Cafú 36'; Okkas 41'; Žlogar 51'	(Report)

GSP Stadium, Nicosia
Attendance: 16.528
Referee: Panayiotis Gerasimou

2008-10-31
19:00

Anorthosis	2–0	APOP Kinyras
Frousos 88'; Frousos 90+2'	(Report)

Antonis Papadopoulos Stadium, Larnaca
Attendance: 8.500
Referee: Stelios Trifonos

2008-11-09
17:00

Enosis	0–3	Anorthosis
	(Report)	Sosin 70'; Hawar M. 76'; Hawar M. 84' (pen.)

Paralimni Stadium, Paralimni
Attendance: 3.100
Referee: Demetris Chrysostomou

2008-11-16
18:00

Anorthosis	2–1	Alki
Skopelitis 25'; Hawar M. 45' (pen.)	(Report)	Lima 13'

Antonis Papadopoulos Stadium, Larnaca
Attendance: 7.645
Referee: Costas Kapitanis

2008-11-22
18:00

Apollon	1–2	Anorthosis
Yovov 64'	(Report)	Frousos 74'; Sávio 85'

Tsirion Stadium, Limassol
Attendance: 6.521
Referee: Panikos Kailis

2008-11-30
18:00

Anorthosis	3–0	Atromitos
Nicolaou 21'; Skopelitis 52'; Sávio 71'	(Report)

Antonis Papadopoulos Stadium, Larnaca
Attendance: 6.050
Referee: Antonis Christodoulou

2008-12-04
20:00

APOEL	1–0	Anorthosis
Mirosavljević 63'	(Report)

GSP Stadium, Larnaca
Attendance: 11,566
Referee: Leontios Trattos

2008-12-14
18:00

Anorthosis	1–0	AEK
Dobra 60'	(Report)

Antonis Papadopoulos Stadium, Larnaca
Attendance: 7.927
Referee: Demetris Chrysostomou

2008-12-20
19:00

APEP	1–2	Anorthosis
Vogt 41'	(Report)	Sosin 65'; Hawar M. 70' (pen.)

Tsirion Stadium, Limassol
Attendance: 2,300
Referee: Marios Stamatis

2008-12-28
18:00

Anorthosis	2–0	Doxa
Hawar M. 33' (pen.); Frousos 71'	(Report)

Antonis Papadopoulos Stadium, Larnaca
Attendance: 6.491
Referee: Marios Tsangaris

2009-01-03
16:30

Ethnikos	0–1	Anorthosis
	(Report)	Nicolaou 35'

Dasaki Stadium, Famagusta
Attendance: 3,300
Referee: Panayiotis Gerasimou

2009-01-10
19:00

Anorthosis	2–1	AEL
Nicolaou 52'; Sosin 89'	(Report)	Freddy 68'

Antonis Papadopoulos Stadium, Larnaca
Attendance: 7.000
Referee: Costas Kapitanis

2009-01-17
17:00

AEP	2–2	Anorthosis
Ba 64'; Chailis 75'	(Report)	Tsitaishvili 33'; Skopelitis 90+3'

Pafiako Stadium, Paphos
Attendance: 3.300
Referee: Panikos Kailis

2009-01-25
18:00

Anorthosis	1–2	Omonia
Sávio 48'	(Report)	Aloneftis 39' (pen.); Aloneftis 90+1'

Antonis Papadopoulos Stadium, Larnaca
Attendance: 8.000
Referee: Costas Kapitanis

2009-01-31
15:00

APOP Kinyras	0–3	Anorthosis
	(Report)	Hawar M. 43'; Georgiou 49'; Trică 65'

Peyia Municipal Stadium, Peyia
Attendance: 1.500
Referee: Demetris Chrysostomou

2009-02-07
18:00

Anorthosis	1–0	Enosis
Constantinou 72'	(Report)

Antonis Papadopoulos Stadium, Larnaca
Attendance: 7.400
Referee: Stelios Trifonos

2009-02-14
19:00

Alki	0–2	Anorthosis
	(Report)	Bardon 31'; Skopelitis 52'

Rafael Group Ammochostos Stadium, Larnaca
Attendance: 2.800
Referee: Stelios Trifonos

2009-02-21
19:00

Anorthosis	2–1	Apollon
Trică 36' (pen.); Frousos 79'	(Report)	Risso 69'

Antonis Papadopoulos Stadium, Larnaca
Attendance: 7.200
Referee: Costas Kapitanis

2009-03-01
16:00

Atromitos	1–6	Anorthosis
Kimoto 84'	(Report)	Sosin 6'; Sosin 18'; Bardon 49'; Sosin 73'; Tofas 78'; Sosin 90'

Pafiako Stadium, Paphos
Attendance: 2.500
Referee: Charis Glykis

2009-03-08
16:00

Anorthosis	1–2	APOEL
Frousos 60'	(Report)	Żewłakow 64'; Morais 77'

Antonis Papadopoulos Stadium, Larnaca
Attendance: 9.500
Referee: Leontios Trattos

2009-03-15
17:00

AEK	1–3	Anorthosis
Silva 29'	(report)	Garpozis 4'; Constantinou 45'; Bardon 55'

GSZ Stadium, Larnaca
Attendance: 2.000
Referee: Savvas Zafeiris

==== Playoffs ====
2009-03-22
16:00

Anorthosis	0–2	Omonia
	(report)	Konstantinou 64'; Christofi 74'

Antonis Papadopoulos Stadium, Larnaca
Attendance: 10,000
Referee: Asaf Kenan (Israel)

2009-04-05
18:00

Anorthosis	1–0	AEL
Frousos 21'	(report)

Antonis Papadopoulos Stadium, Larnaca
Referee: Costas Kapitanis

2009-04-11
19:00

APOEL	2–0	Anorthosis
Kosowski 14'; Michael 65' (pen.)	(report)

GSP Stadium, Nicosia
Attendance: 10,689
Referee: Stelios Trifonos

2009-04-25
19:00

Anorthosis	1–1	APOEL
Skopelitis 19'	(report)	Żewłakow 38'

Antonis Papadopoulos Stadium, Nicosia
Attendance: 5,000
Referee: Christos Nicolaides

2009-05-02
18:00

Omonia	1–0	Anorthosis
Kaiafas 55'	(report)

GSP Stadium, Nicosia
Attendance: 5,750
Referee: Demetris Chrysostomou

2009-05-09
18:00

AEL	1–0	Anorthosis
Gadiaga 15'	(report)	Tofas 5'

GSP Stadium, Nicosia
Attendance: 4,200
Referee: Vasilis Demetriou

=== Cypriot Cup ===
All times at EET

==== Second round ====
2009-01-21
18:00

Anorthosis	2–1	Apollon
Sosin 17'; Sávio 80'	(Report)	Sangoy 90+2' (pen.)

Antonis Papadopoulos Stadium, Larnaca
Attendance: 7.500
Referee: Leontios Trattos

2008-11-22
18:00

Apollon	3–1 (a.e.t.)	Anorthosis
Sangoy G. 39'; Sangoy G. 51'; David 118'	(Report)	Katsavakis 69'

Tsirion Stadium, Limassol
Attendance: 10.000
Referee: Panikos Kailis

=== 2008–09 UEFA Champions League ===
Time at CET

- First Qualifying Round
2008-07-15
19:00

Anorthosis (Cyprus)	1–0	(Armenia) Pyunik
Frousos 72' (pen.)	(Report)

GSP Stadium, Nicosia
Attendance: 6,685
Referee: Jérome Efong Nzolo (Belgium)
2008-07-23
19:00

Pyunik (Armenia)	0–2	(Cyprus) Anorthosis
	(Report)	Tsitaishvili 29'; Frousos 86'

Abovyan City, Yerevan
Attendance: 1,100
Referee: Babak Rafati (Germany)

- Second Qualifying Round
2008-07-30
20:00

Anorthosis (Cyprus)	3–0	(Austria) Rapid Wien
Skopelitis 35'; Sosin 47', 90+2'	(Report)

Antonis Papadopoulos Stadium, Larnaca
Attendance: 10,000
Referee: Carlos Velasco Carballo (Spain)
2008-08-13
20:15

Rapid Wien (Austria)	3–1	(Cyprus) Anorthosis
Hoffer 22'; Maierhofer 63', 67'	(Report)	Laban 13'

Gerhard Hanappi, Wien
Attendance: 16,830
Referee: Peter Rasmussen (Denmark)

- Third Qualifying Round
2008-08-13
20:00

Anorthosis (Cyprus)	3–0	(Greece) Olympiacos
Torosidis 4' (o.g.); Sosin 17'; Laban 86'	(Report)

Antonis Papadopoulos Stadium, Larnaca
Attendance: 10,000
Referee: Olegário Benquerença (Portugal)
2008-08-27
20:45

Olympiacos (Greece)	1–0	(Cyprus) Anorthosis
Belluschi 54'	(report)

Georgios Karaiskakis Stadium, Athens
Attendance: 32,000
Referee: Herbert Fandel (Germany)

==== Group Stage: Group B ====
Pos	Team	Pld	W	D	L	GF	GA	GD	Pts	Qualification	PAN	INT	BRM	ANO
1	(Greece) Panathinaikos	6	3	1	2	8	7	+1	10	Advance to knockout phase	—	0–2	2–2	1–0
2	(Italy) Internazionale	6	2	2	2	8	7	+1	8	Advance to knockout phase	0–1	—	1–1	1–0
3	(Germany) Werder Bremen	6	1	4	1	7	9	−2	7	Transfer to UEFA Cup	0–3	2–1	—	0–0
4	(Cyprus) Anorthosis Famagusta	6	1	3	2	8	8	0	6		3–1	3–3	2–2	—

Source: RSSSF
2008-09-16
20:45

Werder Bremen (Germany)	0–0	(Cyprus) Anorthosis
	Report

Weserstadion, Bremen
Attendance: 34,690
Referee: Craig Thomson (Scotland)

2008-10-01
20:45

Anorthosis (Cyprus)	3–1	(Greece) Panathinaikos
Sarriegi 11' (o.g.); Dobrašinović 15'; Hawar M. 78'	Report	Salpingidis 28' (pen.)

GSP Stadium, Nicosia
Attendance: 19,259
Referee: Eric Braamhaar (Netherlands)

2008-10-22
20:45

Internazionale (Italy)	1–0	(Cyprus) Anorthosis
Adriano 44'	Report

Stadio Giuseppe Meazza, Milan
Attendance: 27,247
Referee: Howard Webb (England)

2008-11-04
20:45

Anorthosis (Cyprus)	3–3	(Italy) Internazionale
Bardon 31'; Panagi 45+1'; Frousos 50'		Balotelli 13'; Materazzi 44'; Cruz 80'

GSP Stadium, Nicosia
Attendance: 17,140
Referee: Laurent Duhamel (France)

2008-11-26
20:45

Anorthosis (Cyprus)	2–2	(Germany) Werder Bremen
Nicolaou 62'; Sávio 68'	Report	Diego 72' (pen.); Almeida 87'

GSP Stadium, Nicosia
Attendance: 18,461
Referee: Manuel Mejuto González (Spain)

2008-12-09
20:45

Panathinaikos (Greece)	1–0	(Cyprus) Anorthosis
Karagounis 69'	Report

Olympic Stadium, Athens
Attendance: 59,872
Referee: Bertrand Layec (France)
