= Anorthosis Famagusta F.C. in European football =

- Club: Anorthosis Famagusta
- First entry: 1963–64 European Cup
- Latest entry: 2021–22 UEFA Europa Conference League

== UEFA Champions League ==
Champions League 2005–06: On 26 July 2005, Anorthosis Famagusta achieved one of the greatest results in Cypriot football history when they beat the Turkish team Trabzonspor 3–1 in the first leg of their UEFA Champions League second qualifying-round match. They lost the second leg 1–0 in Turkey, but progressed 3–2 on aggregate. In the third-round qualifying tie against the Scottish team Rangers, Anorthosis lost the first leg 2–1, and the second leg 2–0, so dropped into the first round of the UEFA Cup. They were then defeated 6–1 on aggregate by the Italian team Palermo.

Champions League 2008–09: After winning the domestic league 2007–2008 Anorthosis managed to qualify for the 2008–2009 UEFA Champions League group stage, over-running Armenian champions FC Pyunik, Austrian champions Rapid Wien and Greek champions Olympiacos in the qualifying rounds. This allowed the team to qualify for the Group Stage of the Champions League, the first time for a Cypriot team. In the group stage, they earned their first point following a 0–0 away draw with Werder Bremen, then got their first win beating Panathinaikos 3–1 while Hawar Mulla Mohammed became the first Iraqi player to score in the UEFA Champions League, although they lost to Inter Milan 1–0 at San Siro, they drew 3–3 in GSP Stadium. In their 5th Champions League game, Anorthosis had a chance to make it to the knock-out stage if they would have won against Werder Bremen. Anorthosis went up 2–0, but in the second half Diego made the score 2–1, and minutes before the match ended, Hugo Almeida managed to equalise for Bremen, and the match finished 2–2. Anorthosis still had a chance to get into the knock-out stage in the final match against Panathinaikos if they would have won. However, during the last game they lost 1–0 away to Panathinaikos. Inter (who had already qualified for the next stage) lost 2–1 to Bremen, meaning that Anorthosis finished fourth – missing out on a consolation UEFA Cup place. In the week prior to the game against Panathinaikos the club was disrupted when the Directors complained to the police that the President was embezzling funds. He was remanded in custody and forced to resign, eventually being released by the police without charges.

== UEFA Cup ==
UEFA Cup 1991–92: The return in European salons after 8 years of absence. Anorthosis was invited to address the 1986 European champion, the famous Steaua Bucharest. The beginning was hard work; The hardest after losing 2–1 in the first game held in a crowded Antonis Papadopoulos Stadium. In the second match Anorthosis would succeed the impossible but finally luck played a bad game. After stunning appearance and excellent coaching from Iortaneskou tied the score with his first goal of the game Obiku and Ketsbaia led the game in overtime, where the Romanians being far more experienced competitors in front of the audience equaled getting this ticket of qualifying. The overexertion of Anorthosis players was actually moving, which realized the anorthosiatikos world and the next day swept Larnaca airport deifying their "fallen hero" of Bucharest.

UEFA Cup 1992–93: In 1992–93 the team participated again in the UEFA Cup. At the draw, they were matched against Juventus F.C., which had the players Roberto Baggio, Gianluca Vialli, Fabrizio Ravanelli, Pierluigi Casiraghi, Angelo Peruzzi, Moreno Torricelli, Andreas Moller, Julio Cesar, Jurgen Kohler, and Trapattoni, the subsequent holder of the trophy. Juventus F.C. defeated Anorthosis 6–1 in Turin, and again 0–4 at the Antonis Papadopoulos stadium. The titular goal of the team was scored by Temuri Ketsbaia, with Georgianos Koutsaef as coach.

UEFA Cup 1994–95: After one year of absence, the club returned again to the UEFA Cup preliminary rounds, where they first played Bulgarian club Shumen. They advanced to the next stage winning 4-1 on aggregate. In the first round, they Greek side faced La Liga side Athletic Bilbao. Despite being underdogs, they managed to win the first leg at home 2-0, before succumbing to a 3-0 loss away at the home of the Basque club, hence being eliminated from the competition.

UEFA Cup 2007–08: Anorthosis qualified for the 2007–08 UEFA Cup by way of their Cypriot Cup win. They entered the competition at the first qualifying-round stage. Aggregate victories over FK Vardar and CFR 1907 Cluj saw them move through to the first round proper. Anorthosis were drawn against English Premier League side Tottenham Hotspur. The first leg was played at White Hart Lane on 20 September 2007 which Tottenham Hotspur won 6–1. On 4 October 2007 the second leg resulted in a 1–1 draw when Robbie Keane equalised for Tottenham Hotspur after Fabinho had put Anorthosis ahead.

== UEFA Europa League ==
Europa League 2009–10: After the highs of their exploits in the previous season's Champions League, Anorthosis went crashing out of the 2009–10 UEFA Europa League in the second qualifying round, losing 4–3 on aggregate to OFK Petrovac of Montenegro.

Europa League 2010–11: Anorthosis started well the Europa League 2010–11 by beating FC Banants of Armenia 3–0 and 0–1 respectively. However, in the second round they lost 0–2 to HNK Šibenik of Croatia. Furthermore, for the next round they managed to qualify after a 3–0 victory accompanied by great performance. In the third qualifying round Anorthosis had a poor performance against Cercle Brugge, losing 0–1 in Belgium. Whenever they came back in Cyprus for the rematch they defeated Cercle 3–1 with Cafu scoring all 3 goals. Anorthosis's adventure ended with a 0–4 loss in Moscow and a 1–2 home loss against CSKA Moscow.

Europa League 2011–2012: Anorthosis in season 2011–12 started from the Second qualifying round. On that round Anorthosis met Fc Garga Georgia. The Cypriot club defeated the Georgian Club 3–0 at the Antonis Papadopoulos Stadium, but then lost to the Georgian Club 2–0 in Zestafoni. In the third qualifying round Anorthosis encountered FK Rabotnički Skopje. The first match at Antonis Papadopoulos Stadium was not the ideal for the Cypriot club, after the first 70 minutes the result was still 0–0. The Skopje Club scored in their first real opportunity in the game, after another 10 minutes the Skopje club scored a second goal after an incredible mistake by the Anorthosis' goalkeeper Dimitar Ivankov. In the second match at the Philip II Arena Anorthosis won 1–2 FK Rabotnički. The score 0–2 until 87-minute, which would send the game to extra-time. After that match Dimitar Ivankov was released from his contract and removed from the Anorthosis Squad.

Europa League 2012–2013: Anorthosis began the season in Second qualifying round of Europa League. Anorthosis faced the cup winner of Estonian for the season 2011–12, Levadia Tallinn, On the first match Anorthosis Famagusta defeat the Estonian club 3–1 (Spadacio, Toni Calvo, Ricardo Laborde) in Kadrioru Stadium, with MVP the best player of the club Ricardo Laborde. On 26 July in Antonis Papadopoulos Stadium Anorthosis defeat Levadia Tallinn with score 3–0 with scorers (Okkas, Toni Calvo, Ricardo Laborde), with MVP the attacking midfielder of the team Juliano Spadacio. On 28 August, Anorthosis defeat Georgian Dila Gori away with score 0–1, With scorer Giannis Okkas at 69th minute. Dila Gori played with 10 players after the ban of Gogita Gogua with red card from the referee. On 9 August after a bad match anorthosis end there European dream at 3rd QR. of uefa europa league. Anorthosis lost 3–0 at his home from Dila Gori.

== European competition matches ==
Win Draw Loss Postponed

=== 1963–64 European Cup ===
11 September 1963 QR.	FK Partizan (Socialist Federal Republic of Yugoslavia)	3–0	(Cyprus) Anorthosis Famagusta	Belgrade, Serbia
	Vladica Kovačević 50' (pen.); Vladica Kovačević 65'; Milan Galić 83'			Stadium: JNA Stadium; Attendance: 11,033; Referee: (Bulgaria) Kostadin Dinov

1 October 1963 QR.	Anorthosis Famagusta (Cyprus)	1–3 (1–6 agg.)	(Socialist Federal Republic of Yugoslavia) FK Partizan	Famagusta, Cyprus
	Kokkinis 20'		25' Milan Galić; 25' Mane Bajić; 85' Vladica Kovačević	Stadium: GSE Stadium; Attendance: 6,245; Referee: (Turkey) Hakki Gürüz

=== 1964–65 Cup Winners' Cup ===
16 September 1964 QR.	Spartak Praha Sokolovo (Czechoslovakia)	10–0	(Cyprus) Anorthosis Famagusta	Prague, Czech Republic
				Stadium: Letná Stadium; Attendance: 12,055

20 September 1964 QR.	Anorthosis Famagusta (Cyprus)	0–6 (0–16 agg.)	(Czechoslovakia) Spartak Praha Sokolovo	Plzeň, Czech Republic
				Stadium: Stadion města Plzně; Attendance: 8,007

=== 1971–72 Cup Winners' Cup ===
29 September 1971 1st QR.	Beerschot (Belgium)	1–0	(Cyprus) Anorthosis Famagusta	Antwerp, Belgium
				Stadium: Antwerp; Attendance: 12,072

23 September 1971 1st QR.	Anorthosis Famagusta (Cyprus)	0–7 (0–8 agg.)	(Belgium) Beerschot	Antwerp, Belgium
				Stadium: Antwerp; Attendance: 11,001

=== 1975–76 Cup Winners' Cup ===
17 September 1975 1st QR.	Ararat Yerevan (Soviet Union)	9–0	(Cyprus) Anorthosis Famagusta	Abovyan, Armenia
				Stadium: Abovyan City Stadium; Attendance: 2,072

1 October 1975 1st QR.	Anorthosis Famagusta (Cyprus)	1–1 (1–10 agg.)	(Soviet Union) Ararat Yerevan	Famagusta, Cyprus
				Stadium: GSE Stadium; Attendance: 11,001

=== 1983–84 UEFA Cup ===
14 September 1983 1st QR.	Anorthosis Famagusta (Cyprus)	0–1	(Germany) FC Bayern Munich	Famagusta, Cyprus
		Report		Stadium: GSE Stadium; Attendance: 4,278

28 September 1983 1st QR.	FC Bayern Munich (Germany)	10–0 (11–0 agg.)	(Cyprus) Anorthosis Famagusta	Munich, Germany
		Report		Stadium: Olympic Stadium; Attendance: 38,040

=== 1991–92 UEFA Cup ===
17 September 1991 1st QR.	Anorthosis Famagusta (Cyprus)	1–2	(Romania) Steaua București	Larnaka, Cyprus
	Michael Obiku 70' (pen.)	Report	45' Ilie Stan; 47' Ilie Dumitrescu	Stadium: Antonis Papadopoulos Stadium; Attendance: 7,878; Referee: (Austria) Roman Steindl

1 October 1991 1st QR.	Steaua București (Romania)	1–2; 2–2 A.E.T (4–3 agg.)	(Cyprus) Anorthosis Famagusta	Bucharest, Romania
	Ilie Stan 62'; Ilie Stan 115'	Report	53' Michael Obiku; 84' Temuri Ketsbaia	Stadium: Stadionul Steaua; Attendance: 22,000; Referee: (Poland) Piotr Werner

=== 1992–93 UEFA Cup ===
16 September 1992 1st QR.	Juventus (Italy)	6–1	(Cyprus) Anorthosis Famagusta	Turin, Italy
	Roberto Baggio 3'; Andreas Möller 10'; Gianluca Vialli 42'; Gianluca Vialli 61'; Antonio Conte 44'; Moreno Torricelli 75'	Report	85' Temuri Ketsbaia	Stadium: Stadio delle Alpi; Attendance: 50,000; Referee: (Hungary) Laszlo Molnar

29 September 1992 1st QR.	Anorthosis Famagusta (Cyprus)	0–4 (1–10 agg.)	(Italy) Juventus	Larnaca, Cyprus
		Report	14' Fabrizio Ravanelli; 39' Jürgen Kohler; 66' Pierluigi Casiraghi; 87' Pierluigi Casiraghi	Stadium: Antonis Papadopoulos Stadium; Attendance: 8,000; Referee: (England) Brian Hill

=== 1994–95 UEFA Cup ===
9 August 1994 1st QR.	Anorthosis Famagusta (Cyprus)	2–0	(Bulgaria) Shumen	Larnaka, Cyprus
	Charalambous 19'; Srboljub Nikolić 40'	Report		Stadium: Antonis Papadopoulos Stadium; Attendance: 4,238; Referee: (Austria) Alfred Wieser

23 August 1994 1st QR.	Shumen (Bulgaria)	1–2 (1–4 agg.)	(Cyprus) Anorthosis Famagusta	Shumen, Bulgaria
	Bozhidar Iskrenov 43' (pen.)	Report	60' Demetris Assiotis; 82' Siniša Gogić	Stadium: Panayot Volov Stadium; Attendance: 11,000; Referee: (Slovakia)

13 September 1994 2nd QR.	Anorthosis Famagusta (Cyprus)	2–0	(Spain) Athletic Bilbao	Larnaka, Cyprus
	Siniša Gogić 6'; Panicos Pounas 51'	Report		Stadium: Antonis Papadopoulos Stadium; Attendance: 11,287; Referee: (Bulgaria) Atanas Ouzounov

27 September 1994 2nd QR.	Athletic Bilbao (Spain)	3–0 (3–2 agg.)	(Cyprus) Anorthosis Famagusta	Bilbao, Spain
	Julen Guerrero 17'; Andreas Panayiotou 34' (o.g.); Genar Andrinúa 89'	Report		Stadium: San Mamés Stadium; Attendance: 38,000; Referee: (Bulgaria) Atanas Ouzounov

=== 1995–96 Champions League ===
9 August 1995 QR.	Rangers (Scotland)	1–0	(Cyprus) Anorthosis	Glasgow, Scotland
	Gordon Durie 68'	Report MatchCentre		Stadium: Ibrox Park; Attendance: 43,500; Referee: (Belgium) Eric Blareau

23 August 1995 QR.	Anorthosis (Cyprus)	0–0 (0–1 agg.)	(Scotland) Rangers	Larnaka, Cyprus
		Report MatchCentre		Stadium: Antonis Papadopoulos Stadium; Attendance: 9,400; Referee: (Hungary) László Vágner

=== 1996–97 UEFA Cup ===
17 July 1996 1st QR.	Anorthosis Famagusta (Cyprus)	4–0	(Armenia) Shirak	Larnaca, Cyprus
	Vesko Mihajlović 53'; Vesko Mihajlović 83'; Siniša Gogić 60' (pen.); Siniša Gogić 72' (pen.)	Report		Stadium: Antonis Papadopoulos Stadium; Attendance: 7,450; Referee: (Czech Republic) Miroslav Liba

24 July 1996 1st QR.	Shirak (Armenia)	2–2 (2–6 agg.)	(Cyprus) Anorthosis Famagusta	Gyumri, Armenia
	Ararat Harutyunyan 15'; Harutyun Vardanyan 25'	Report	18' (pen.) Siniša Gogić; 47' Vesko Mihajlović	Stadium: Gyumri City Stadium; Attendance: 1,250; Referee: (Belarus) Gennady Yakubovsky

6 August 1996 2nd QR.	Anorthosis Famagusta (Cyprus)	1–2	(Switzerland) Neuchâtel Xamax	Larnaca, Cyprus
	Konstandinos Stavrou 18'	Report	29' Alain Vernier; 57' Marek Leśniak	Stadium: Antonis Papadopoulos Stadium; Attendance: 9,000; Referee: (Wales) Christopher Howells

20 August 1996 2nd QR.	Neuchâtel Xamax (Switzerland)	4–0 (6–1 agg.)	(Cyprus) Anorthosis Famagusta	Neuchâtel, Switzerland
	Liazid Sandjak 10'; Liazid Sandjak 10'; Jean-Pierre Cyprien 17'; Alain Vernier 37'	Report		Stadium: Stade de la Maladière; Attendance: 12,074; Referee: (Israel) Haim Lipkovitz

=== 1997–98 UEFA Champions League and UEFA Cup ===
23 July 1997 1st QR.	Anorthosis Famagusta (Cyprus)	3–0	(Lithuania) Kaunas	Larnaka, Cyprus
	Slobodan Krčmarević 20'; Ioannis Okkas 47'; Ioannis Okkas 81'	Report		Stadium: Antonis Papadopoulos Stadium; Attendance: 11,300; Referee: (Malta) Charles Agius

30 July 1997 1st QR.	Kaunas (Lithuania)	1–1 (1–4 agg.)	(Cyprus) Anorthosis Famagusta	Kaunas, Lithuania
		Report		Stadium: Kariuomenės Stadium; Attendance: 740; Referee: (England) Graham Poll

13 August 1997 2nd QR.	Anorthosis Famagusta (Cyprus)	2–0	(Belgium) Lierse S.K.	Larnaka, Cyprus
		Report		Stadium: Antonis Papadopoulos Stadium; Attendance: 11,300; Referee: (France) Alain Sars

27 August 1997 2nd QR.	Lierse S.K. (Belgium)	3–0 (3–2 agg.)	(Cyprus) Anorthosis Famagusta	Lier, Belgium
		Report		Stadium: Herman Vanderpoortenstadion; Attendance: 14,538; Referee: (Slovakia) Ľuboš Michel

16 September 1997 1st R.	Karlsruhe (Germany)	2–1	(Cyprus) Anorthosis Famagusta	Karlsruhe, Germany
	David Regis 11'; Markus Schroth 88'	Report	34' Zacharias Charalambous	Stadium: Wildparkstadion; Attendance: 12,000; Referee: (Romania) Adrian Stoica

30 September 1997 1st R.	Anorthosis Famagusta (Cyprus)	1–1 (2–3 agg.)	(Germany) Karlsruhe	Larnaka, Cyprus
	Vesko Mihajlović 12'	Report	42' Gunther Schepens	Stadium: Antonis Papadopoulos Stadium; Attendance: 9,000; Referee: (Netherlands) Herman van Dijk

=== 2008–09 Champions League ===
15 July 2008 1st QR.	Anorthosis Famagusta (Cyprus)	1–0	(Armenia) FC Pyunik	GSP Stadium, Nicosia
19:00	Nikolaos Frousos 72' (pen.)	(Report)		Attendance: 6,685; Referee: (Belgium) Jérome Efong Nzolo

23 July 2008 1st QR.	FC Pyunik (Armenia)	0–2 (0–3 agg.)	(Cyprus) Anorthosis Famagusta	Abovyan City, Yerevan
19:00		(Report)	29' Klimenti Tsitaishvili; 86' Nikolaos Frousos	Attendance: 1,100; Referee: (Germany) Babak Rafati

30 July 2008 2nd QR.	Anorthosis Famagusta (Cyprus)	3–0	(Austria) Rapid Wien	Antonis Papadopoulos Stadium, Larnaca
20:00	Giannis Skopelitis 35'; Łukasz Sosin 47'; Łukasz Sosin 90+2'	(Report)		Attendance: 10,000; Referee: (Spain) Carlos Velasco Carballo

13 August 2008 2nd QR.	Rapid Wien (Austria)	3–1 (3–4 agg.)	(Cyprus) Anorthosis Famagusta	Gerhard Hanappi, Wien
20:15	Erwin Hoffer 22'; Stefan Maierhofer 63'; Stefan Maierhofer 67'	(Report)	13' Vincent Laban	Attendance: 16,830; Referee: (Denmark) Peter Rasmussen

13 August 2008 3rd QR.	Anorthosis Famagusta (Cyprus)	3–0	(Greece) Olympiacos Pireus	Antonis Papadopoulos Stadium, Larnaca
20:00	Vasilis Torosidis 4' (o.g.); Łukasz Sosin 17'; Vincent Laban 86'	(Report)		Attendance: 10,000; Referee: (Portugal) Olegário Benquerença

27 August 2008 3rd QR.	Olympiacos (Greece)	1–0 (1–3 agg.)	(Cyprus) Anorthosis Famagusta	Karaiskakis Stadium, Piraeus
20:45	Fernando Belluschi 54'	(report)		Attendance: 32,000; Referee: (Germany) Herbert Fandel

Team	Pld	W	D	L	GF	GA	GD	Pts
(Greece) Panathinaikos	6	3	1	2	8	7	+1	10
(Italy) Internazionale	6	2	2	2	8	7	+1	8
(Germany) Werder Bremen	6	1	4	1	7	9	−2	7
(Cyprus) Anorthosis Famagusta	6	1	3	2	8	8	0	6

	ANO	INT	PAN	BRM
Anorthosis	–	3–3	3–1	2–2
Internazionale	1–0	-	0–1	1–1
Panathinaikos	1–0	0–2	-	2–2
Werder Bremen	0–0	2–1	0–3	–

16 September 2008 1st Match Day	Werder Bremen (Germany)	0–0	(Cyprus) Anorthosis Famagusta	Weserstadion, Bremen
20:45		Report		Attendance: 34,690; Referee: (Scotland) Craig Thomson

1 October 2008 2nd Match Day	Anorthosis Famagusta (Cyprus)	3–1	(Greece) Panathinaikos	GSP Stadium, Nicosia
20:45	Josu Sarriegi 11' (o.g.); Siniša Dobrasinović 15'; Hawar Mulla Mohammed 78'	Report	28' (pen.) Dimitris Salpingidis	Attendance: 19,259; Referee: (Netherlands) Eric Braamhaar

22 October 2008 3rd Match Day	Internazionale (Italy)	1–0	(Cyprus) Anorthosis Famagusta	Stadio Giuseppe Meazza, Milan
20:45	Adriano 44'	Report		Attendance: 27,247; Referee: (England) Howard Webb

4 November 2008 4th Match Day	Anorthosis Famagusta (Cyprus)	3–3	(Italy) Internazionale	GSP Stadium, Nicosia
20:45	Cédric Bardon 31'; Giorgos Panagi 45+1'; Nikolaos Frousos 50'		13' Mario Balotelli; 44' Marco Materazzi; 80' Cruz	Attendance: 17,140; Referee: (France) Laurent Duhamel

26 November 2008 5th Match Day	Anorthosis Famagusta (Cyprus)	2–2	(Germany) Werder Bremen	GSP Stadium, Nicosia
20:45	Nikos Nicolaou 62'; Sávio 68'	Report	72' (pen.) Diego; 87' Hugo Almeida	Attendance: 18,461; Referee: (Spain) Manuel Mejuto González

9 December 2008 6th Match Day	Panathinaikos (Greece)	1–0	(Cyprus) Anorthosis Famagusta	Olympic Stadium, Athens
20:45	Giorgos Karagounis 69'	Report		Attendance: 59,872; Referee: (France) Bertrand Layec

=== 2011–12 Europa League ===
14 July 2011 2nd QR.	Anorthosis Famagusta (Cyprus)	3–0	(Georgia (country)) FC Gagra	Larnaka, Cyprus
19:30	Nemanja Vučićević 9'; Jan Rezek 35'; Jan Rezek 71'	Report	(yellow card) 13' Zviad Chkhetiani; (yellow card) 15' Mykola Nakonechniy; (yellow card) 25' Sichinava	Stadium: Antonis Papadopoulos Stadium; Attendance: 6.550; Referee: (Czech Republic) Radek Matějek

21 July 2011 2nd QR.	FC Gagra (Georgia (country))	2–0 (2–3 agg.)	(Cyprus) Anorthosis Famagusta	Zestaponi, Georgia
20:00	Giorgi Gabedava 6'; Zviad Chkhetiani (yellow card) 39'; Giorgi Tkeshelashvili 40'; Irakli Khutsidze 69'; Nikoloz Jishkariani (yellow card) 75'	Report	(yellow card) 58' Igor Tomašić; (yellow card) 60' Ricardo Laborde	Stadium: David Abashidze; Attendance: 3.800; Referee: (Germany) Peter Sippel

14 July 2011 3rd QR.	Anorthosis Famagusta (Cyprus)	0–2	(North Macedonia) FK Rabotnički	Larnaka, Cyprus
19:00	Igor Tomašić (yellow card) 28'; Cristovão Ramos (yellow card) 31'; Vincent Laban (yellow card) 43'; Janicio Martins (yellow card) 76'	Report	(yellow card) 1' Pance Kumbev; (yellow card) 33' Krste Velkovski; 71' Milovan Petrović; 82' Krste Velkovski	Stadium: Antonis Papadopoulos Stadium; Attendance: 7.000; Referee: (Austria) Harald Lechner

21 July 2011 3rd QR.	FK Rabotnički (North Macedonia)	1–2 (3–2 agg.)	(Cyprus) Anorthosis Famagusta	Skopje, Macedonia
20:00	Milovan Petrovic (yellow card) 24'; Panče Kumbev (yellow card) 60'; Stole Dimitrievski (yellow card) 61'; Panče Kumbev 87'; Borče Manevski (yellow card) 90+6'	Report	(yellow card) 19' Ricardo Laborde; 50' Jan Rezek; (yellow card) 50' Cristovão Ramos; 65' Cristovão Ramos	Stadium: Philip II Arena; Attendance: 4.500; Referee: (Bulgaria) Nikolai Yordanov

=== 2012–13 Europa League ===
19 July 2012 2nd QR.	Levadia Tallinn (Estonia)	1–3	(Cyprus) Anorthosis Famagusta	Tallinn, Estonia
18:45	Igor Morozov 82'	Report	45' Juliano Spadacio; 56' Ricardo Laborde; 62' Toni Calvo	Stadium: Kadrioru Stadium; Attendance: 2.550; Referee: (Germany) Marco Fritz; Man of the Match: Ricardo Laborde

26 July 2012 2nd QR.	Anorthosis Famagusta (Cyprus)	3–0 (6–1 agg.)	(Estonia) Levadia Tallinn	Larnaka, Cyprus
20:00	Toni Calvo 13'; Giannis Okkas 41'; Ricardo Laborde 62'	Report		Stadium: Antonis Papadopoulos Stadium; Attendance: 8.050; Referee: (Ukraine) Evgen Aranovsky; Man of the Match: Juliano Spadacio

2 August 2012 3rd QR.	Dila Gori (Georgia (country))	0–1	(Cyprus) Anorthosis Famagusta	Tbilisi, Georgia
19:00	Irakli Modebadze (yellow card) 24'; Giorgi Shashiashvili (yellow card) 26'; Gogita Gogua (yellow card) 29'; Giga Bechvaia (yellow card) 45+2'; Gogita Gogua (yellow card) 57' (yellow-red card); Vako Katsitadze (yellow card) 80'	Report	(yellow card) 15' Giannis Okkas; (yellow card) 45+4' Jürgen Colin; (yellow card) 69' Evandro Roncatto; (yellow card) 80' Dan Alexa; (yellow card) 86' Branko Ilič; 69' Giannis Okkas	Stadium: Mikheil Meskhi Stadium; Attendance: 6.000; Referee: (Norway) Ken Henry Johnsen; Man of the Match: Giannis Okkas

9 August 2012 3rd QR.	Anorthosis Famagusta (Cyprus)	0–3 (1–3 agg.)	(Georgia (country)) Dila Gori	Larnaka, Cyprus
20:00	Dan Alexa (yellow card) 56'; Jurgen Colin (yellow card) 76'; Vincent Laban (red card) 79'	Report	(yellow card) 4' Giorgi Oniani; (yellow card) 15' Lasha Salukvadze; (yellow card) 25' Mate Vatsadze; (yellow card) 25+1' Lasha Gvalia; 54' Mate Vatsadze; (yellow card) 73' Giga Bechvaia; 78' Lasha Salukvadze; 80' Mate Vatsadze	Stadium: Antonis Papadopoulos Stadium; Attendance: 9.000; Referee: (Hungary) Ádám Radványi; Man of the Match: Mate Vatsadze

== Record ==
Season	Competition	Round	Club	Home	Away	
1963–64	European Cup	Q	(Socialist Federal Republic of Yugoslavia) Partizan	1–3	0–3	
1964–65	Cup Winners' Cup	Q	(Czechoslovakia) Sparta Prague	0–6^{1}	0–10	
1971–72	Cup Winners' Cup	1R	(Belgium) Beerschot	0–1^{2}	0–7	
1975–76	Cup Winners' Cup	1R	(Soviet Union) Ararat Yerevan	1–1	0–9	
1983–84	UEFA Cup	1R	(West Germany) Bayern Munich	0–1	0–10	
1991–92	UEFA Cup	1R	(Romania) Steaua București	1–2	2–2	
1992–93	UEFA Cup	1R	(Italy) Juventus	0–4	1–6	
1994–95	UEFA Cup	Q	(Bulgaria) Shumen	2–0	2–1	
1994–95	UEFA Cup	1R	(Spain) Athletic Bilbao	2–0	0–3	
1995–96	Champions League	Q	(Scotland) Rangers	0–0	0–1	
1996–97	UEFA Cup	1Q	(Armenia) Shirak	4–0	2–2	
1996–97	UEFA Cup	2Q	(Switzerland) Neuchâtel Xamax	1–2	0–4	
1997–98	Champions League	1Q	(Lithuania) Kareda Kaunas	3–0	1–1	
1997–98	Champions League	2Q	(Belgium) Lierse	2–0	0–3	
1997–98	UEFA Cup	1R	(Germany) Karlsruher SC	1–1	1–2	
1998–99	Champions League	1Q	(Malta) Valletta	6–0	2–0	
1998–99	Champions League	2Q	(Greece) Olympiacos	2–4	1–2	
1998–99	UEFA Cup	1R	(Switzerland) Zürich	2–3	0–4	
1999–00	Champions League	1Q	(Slovakia) Slovan Bratislava	2–1	1–1	
1999–00	Champions League	2Q	(Germany) Hertha	0–0	0–2	
1999–00	UEFA Cup	1R	(Poland) Legia Warszawa	1–0	0–2	
2000–01	Champions League	Q	(Belgium) Anderlecht	0–0	2–4	
2002–03	UEFA Cup	Q	(Luxembourg) Grevenmacher	3–0	0–2	
2002–03	UEFA Cup	1R	(Greece) Iraklis	3–1	2–4	
2002–03	UEFA Cup	2R	(Portugal) Boavista	0–1	1–2	
2003–04	UEFA Cup	Q	(Bosnia and Herzegovina) Željezničar Sarajevo	1–3	0–1	
2005–06	Champions League	1Q	(Belarus) Dinamo Minsk	1–0	1–1	
2005–06	Champions League	2Q	(Turkey) Trabzonspor	3–1	0–1	
2005–06	Champions League	3Q	(Scotland) Rangers	1–2	0–2	
2005–06	UEFA Cup	1R	(Italy) Palermo	0–4	1–2	
2007–08	UEFA Cup	1Q	(North Macedonia) Vardar	1–0	1–0	
2007–08	UEFA Cup	2Q	(Romania) Cluj	0–0	3–1	
2007–08	UEFA Cup	1R	(England) Tottenham Hotspur	1–1	1–6	
2008–09	Champions League	1Q	(Armenia) Pyunik	1–0	2–0	
2008–09	Champions League	2Q	(Austria) Rapid Wien	3–0	1–3	
2008–09	Champions League	3Q	(Greece) Olympiacos	3–0	0–1	
2008–09	Champions League	G	(Germany) Werder Bremen	2–2	0–0	4th place
2008–09	Champions League	G	(Greece) Panathinaikos	3–1	0–1	4th place
2008–09	Champions League	G	(Italy) Internazionale	3–3	0–1	4th place
2009–10	Europa League	1Q	(Luxembourg) Käerjéng 97	5–0	2–1	
2009–10	Europa League	2Q	(Montenegro) Petrovac	2–1	1–3 (a.e.t.)	
2010–11	Europa League	1Q	(Armenia) Banants	3–0	1–0	
2010–11	Europa League	2Q	(Croatia) HNK Šibenik	0–2	3–0 (a.e.t.)	
2010–11	Europa League	3Q	(Belgium) Cercle Brugge	3–1	0–1	
2010–11	Europa League	4Q	(Russia) CSKA Moscow	1–2	0–4	
2011–12	Europa League	2Q	(Georgia (country)) FC Gagra	3–0	0–2	
2011–12	Europa League	3Q	(North Macedonia) FK Rabotnički	0–2	2–1	
2012–13	Europa League	2Q	(Estonia) Levadia Tallinn	3–0	3–1	
2012–13	Europa League	3Q	(Georgia (country)) FC Dila Gori	0–3	1–0	
2018–19	Europa League	1Q	(Albania) Laçi	2–1	0–1	
2020–21	Europa League	3Q	(Switzerland) Basel	—N/a	2–3	
2021–22	Europa League	3Q	(Austria) Rapid Wien	2–1	0–3	
2021–22	Europa Conference League	PO	(Israel) Hapoel Be'er Sheva	3–1	0–0	
2021–22	Europa Conference League	B	(Belgium) Gent	1-0	0-2	3rd place
2021–22	Europa Conference League	B	(Serbia) Partizan	0-2	1–1	3rd place
2021–22	Europa Conference League	B	(Estonia) Flora	2-2	2-2	3rd place

^{1}: Both matches played in Czechoslovakia.
^{2}: Both matches played in Belgium.

=== UEFA club competition record ===
Last Update: 9 December 2021

Competition	GP	W	D	L	GF	GA
Champions League	36	12	9	15	47	44
Cup Winners' Cup	6	0	1	5	1	34
UEFA Cup	36	10	5	21	50	82
Europa League	25	14	0	11	37	32
Europa Conference League	8	2	4	2	9	10
UEFA Intertoto Cup	2	0	0	2	0	8
Total	113	38	20	56	146	211

=== By country ===
Country	Pld	W	D	L	GF	GA	GD	Win%
Serbia	4	0	1	3	2	9	−7	0.00
Czech Republic	2	0	0	2	0	16	−16	0.00
Belgium	10	3	1	6	9	20	−11	30.00
Soviet Union	2	0	1	1	1	10	−9	0.00
Germany	8	2	2	4	4	18	−14	25.00
Romania	4	1	2	1	6	5	+1	25.00
Italy	6	1	0	5	5	20	−15	16.67
Bulgaria	2	2	0	0	4	1	+3	100.00
Spain	2	1	0	1	2	3	−1	50.00
Scotland	4	0	1	3	1	5	−4	0.00
Armenia	6	5	1	0	13	2	+11	83.33
Switzerland	5	0	0	5	3	16	−13	0.00
Lithuania	2	1	1	0	4	1	+3	50.00
Malta	2	2	0	0	8	0	+8	100.00
Greece	8	3	0	5	14	14	+0	37.50
Slovakia	2	1	1	0	3	2	+1	50.00
Poland	2	1	0	1	1	2	−1	50.00
Luxembourg	4	3	0	1	10	3	+7	75.00
Portugal	2	0	0	2	1	3	−2	0.00
Bosnia and Herzegovina	2	0	0	2	1	4	−3	0.00
Belarus	2	1	1	0	2	1	+1	50.00
Turkey	2	1	0	1	3	2	+1	50.00
Switzerland	2	1	0	1	1	2	−1	50.00
Republic of Macedonia	4	3	0	1	4	3	+1	75.00
England	2	0	1	1	2	7	−5	0.00
Austria	4	2	0	2	6	7	−1	50.00
Montenegro	2	1	0	1	3	4	−1	50.00
Croatia	2	1	0	1	3	2	+1	50.00
Russia	2	0	0	2	1	6	−5	0.00
Georgia	4	2	0	2	4	5	−1	50.00
Estonia	4	2	2	0	10	5	+5	50.00
Albania	2	1	0	1	2	2	+0	50.00
Israel	2	1	1	0	3	1	+2	50.00

== Bibliography ==
- Gavreilides, Michalis; Papamoiseos, Stelios (2001). Ένας αιώνας Κυπριακό ποδόσφαιρο [One century Cypriot football] (in Greek). Nicosia: The writer. ISBN 9963-8720-1-8.
- Stephanidis, Giorgos (2003). 40 χρόνια κυπριακές ομάδες στην Ευρώπη [40 years Cypriot teams in Europe] (in Greek). Nicosia: Haravgi. ISBN 9963-8841-1-3.
