= 2008–09 UEFA Champions League qualifying rounds =

European football tournament

The qualifying rounds for the 2008–09 UEFA Champions League began on 15 July 2008. In total, there were three qualifying rounds which provided 16 clubs to join the group stages.

Times are CEST (UTC+2), as listed by UEFA.

== Teams ==
Key to colours
Qualify for the group stage
Eliminated in the Third qualifying round; Advanced to the UEFA Cup first round

Third qualifying round
Team	Coeff.
(England) Liverpool	118.996
(Spain) Barcelona	117.837
(England) Arsenal	110.996
(Germany) Schalke 04	67.078
(Italy) Juventus	66.934
(France) Marseille	63.380
(Romania) Steaua București	59.398
(Greece) Olympiacos	51.525
(Ukraine) Shakhtar Donetsk	49.932
(Italy) Fiorentina	40.934
(Russia) Spartak Moscow	40.437
(Spain) Atlético Madrid	36.837
(Bulgaria) Levski Sofia	32.644
(Czech Republic) Slavia Prague	31.496
(Turkey) Galatasaray	30.469
(Portugal) Vitória de Guimarães	18.176
(Belgium) Standard Liège	14.810
(Netherlands) Twente	14.610

Second qualifying round
Team	Coeff.
(Scotland) Rangers	66.013
(Greece) Panathinaikos	52.525
(Switzerland) Basel	51.993
(Turkey) Fenerbahçe	51.469
(Belgium) Anderlecht	41.810
(Czech Republic) Sparta Prague	36.496
(Ukraine) Dynamo Kyiv	34.932
(Serbia) Partizan	25.527
(Poland) Wisła Kraków	15.973
(Denmark) AaB	12.748
(Norway) Brann	12.400
(Austria) Rapid Wien	10.840
(Israel) Beitar Jerusalem	5.197
(Hungary) MTK Budapest	4.960

First qualifying round
Team	Coeff.
(Croatia) Dinamo Zagreb	17.836
(Slovakia) Artmedia Petržalka	14.070
(Slovenia) Domžale	5.272
(Sweden) IFK Göteborg	4.518
(Cyprus) Anorthosis Famagusta	4.327
(Finland) Tampere United	4.176
(Georgia (country)) Dinamo Tbilisi	3.925
(Latvia) Ventspils	3.915
(North Macedonia) Rabotnicki	3.090
(Bosnia and Herzegovina) Modriča Maxima	2.805
(Lithuania) Kaunas	2.640
(Moldova) Sheriff Tiraspol	2.475
(Republic of Ireland) Drogheda United	2.420
(Iceland) Valur	1.980
(Belarus) BATE Borisov	1.760
(Estonia) Levadia Tallinn	1.430
(Azerbaijan) Inter Baku	1.265
(Albania) Dinamo Tirana	1.210
(Armenia) Pyunik	1.210
(Kazakhstan) Aktobe	0.852
(Northern Ireland) Linfield	0.770
(Wales) Llanelli	0.770
(Faroe Islands) NSÍ	0.605
(Luxembourg) F91 Dudelange	0.495
(Malta) Valletta	0.275
(Andorra) FC Santa Coloma	0.165
(Montenegro) Budućnost Podgorica	0.165
(San Marino) Murata	0.082

== First qualifying round ==
The draw for the first qualifying round took place on 1 July 2008 in Nyon, Switzerland.

=== Seeding ===
In the draw for the first qualifying round, teams were divided into two pots, on the basis of UEFA coefficients. The lower pot contained the 14 teams from associations 40–53: none of these teams had a team ranking.

Seeded		Unseeded	
(Croatia) Dinamo Zagreb (Slovakia) Artmedia Petržalka (Slovenia) Domžale (Sweden) IFK Göteborg (Cyprus) Anorthosis Famagusta (Finland) Tampere United (Georgia (country)) Dinamo Tbilisi	(Latvia) Ventspils (North Macedonia) Rabotnicki (Bosnia and Herzegovina) Modriča Maxima (Lithuania) Kaunas (Moldova) Sheriff Tiraspol (Republic of Ireland) Drogheda United (Iceland) Valur	(Belarus) BATE Borisov (Estonia) Levadia Tallinn (Azerbaijan) Inter Baku (Albania) Dinamo Tirana (Armenia) Pyunik (Kazakhstan) Aktobe (Northern Ireland) Linfield	(Wales) Llanelli (Faroe Islands) NSÍ (Luxembourg) F91 Dudelange (Malta) Valletta (Andorra) FC Santa Coloma (Montenegro) Budućnost Podgorica (San Marino) Murata

=== Summary ===
The first legs were held on 15 and 16 July, while the second legs were played on 22 and 23 July 2008.

Two of the 14 ties were won by the team with the lower UEFA coefficient: Inter Baku (Azerbaijan, country rank 42) beat Rabotnicki (Macedonia, 36); and BATE Borisov (Belarus, 40) beat Valur (Iceland, 37). Of the 28 teams in the first qualifying round, two survived as far as the group stage: Anorthosis Famagusta and BATE Borisov.

Team 1	Agg.	Team 2	1st leg	2nd leg
Linfield (Northern Ireland)	1–3	(Croatia) Dinamo Zagreb	0–2	1–1
Valletta (Malta)	0–3	(Slovakia) Artmedia Petržalka	0–2	0–1
Dinamo Tbilisi (Georgia (country))	3–1	(Faroe Islands) NSÍ	3–0	0–1
FC Santa Coloma (Andorra)	2–7	(Lithuania) Kaunas	1–4	1–3
Murata (San Marino)	0–9	(Sweden) IFK Göteborg	0–5	0–4
Llanelli (Wales)	1–4	(Latvia) Ventspils	1–0	0–4
Anorthosis Famagusta (Cyprus)	3–0	(Armenia) Pyunik	1–0	2–0
Inter Baku (Azerbaijan)	1–1 (a)	(North Macedonia) Rabotnicki	0–0	1–1
Tampere United (Finland)	3–2	(Montenegro) Budućnost Podgorica	2–1	1–1
F91 Dudelange (Luxembourg)	0–3	(Slovenia) Domžale	0–1	0–2
Dinamo Tirana (Albania)	1–4	(Bosnia and Herzegovina) Modriča Maxima	0–2	1–2
Aktobe (Kazakhstan)	1–4	(Moldova) Sheriff Tiraspol	1–0	0–4
Drogheda United (Republic of Ireland)	3–1	(Estonia) Levadia Tallinn	2–1	1–0
BATE Borisov (Belarus)	3–0	(Iceland) Valur	2–0	1–0

=== Matches ===
16 July 2008
20:45

Linfield (Northern Ireland)	0–2	(Croatia) Dinamo Zagreb
	Report	Mandžukić 19'; Drpić 90'

Windsor Park, Belfast
Attendance: 2,900
Referee: Thomas Vejlgaard (Denmark)
23 July 2008
20:45

Dinamo Zagreb (Croatia)	1–1	(Northern Ireland) Linfield
Mandžukić 3'	Report	Gault 53'

Stadion Maksimir, Zagreb
Attendance: 2,835
Referee: Alfonso Pérez Burrull (Spain)

Dinamo Zagreb won 3–1 on aggregate.

15 July 2008
20:00

Valletta (Malta)	0–2	(Slovakia) Artmedia Petržalka
	Report	Cišovský 73', 79'

Ta' Qali National Stadium, Ta' Qali
Attendance: 1,080
Referee: Christoforos Zografos (Greece)
23 July 2008
20:15

Artmedia Petržalka (Slovakia)	1–0	(Malta) Valletta
Farkaš 33'	Report

Národné tréningové centrum, Senec (Note: Artmedia Petržalka played their First and Second qualifying round home matches at Národné tréningové centrum in Senec and Third qualifying round home match at Tehelné pole in Bratislava as their regular home venue Štadión Petržalka in Petržalka did not meet UEFA criteria.)
Attendance: 826
Referee: Vlado Svilokos (Croatia)

Artmedia Petržalka won 3–0 on aggregate.

16 July 2008
16:00

Dinamo Tbilisi (Georgia (country))	3–0	(Faroe Islands) NSÍ
Kashia 7'; Gvelesiani 10'; Odikadze 30' (pen.)	Report

Boris Paichadze Stadium, Tbilisi
Attendance: 1,423
Referee: Ninoslav Spasic (Serbia)
22 July 2008
20:00

NSÍ (Faroe Islands)	1–0	(Georgia (country)) Dinamo Tbilisi
Elttør 16'	Report

Gundadalur Stadium, Tórshavn (Note: Match played at Gundadalur Stadium in Tórshavn, instead of NSÍ regular home venue Við Løkin in Runavík.)
Attendance: 310
Referee: Tero Nieminen (Finland)

Dinamo Tbilisi won 3–1 on aggregate.

15 July 2008
20:30

FC Santa Coloma (Andorra)	1–4	(Lithuania) Kaunas
Álvarez 58' (pen.)	Report	Pilibaitis 12', 41' (pen.); Gaúcho 28', 79'

Estadi Comunal, Andorra la Vella
Attendance: 444
Referee: Panayiotis Kailis (Cyprus)
22 July 2008
18:30

Kaunas (Lithuania)	3–1	(Andorra) FC Santa Coloma
Pilibaitis 19', 90+2'; Zelmikas 22'	Report	N. Urbani 33' (pen.)

Darius and Girėnas Stadium, Kaunas
Attendance: 1,000
Referee: Vitaliy Hodulian (Ukraine)

Kaunas won 7–2 on aggregate.

15 July 2008
20:30

Murata (San Marino)	0–5	(Sweden) IFK Göteborg
	Report	Söder 20'; Alexandersson 27'; Wernbloom 32'; Jónsson 57'; Selaković 88'

Stadio Olimpico, Serravalle
Attendance: 1,868
Referee: Draženko Kovačić (Croatia)
23 July 2008
20:00

IFK Göteborg (Sweden)	4–0	(San Marino) Murata
Johansson 14'; Bärkroth 53', 73'; Wallerstedt 71'	Report

Ullevi, Gothenburg
Attendance: 3,746
Referee: Alan Black (Northern Ireland)

IFK Göteborg won 9–0 on aggregate.

15 July 2008
19:35

Llanelli (Wales)	1–0	(Latvia) Ventspils
S. Jones 12'	Report

Stebonheath Park, Llanelli
Attendance: 942
Referee: Petteri Kari (Estonia)
22 July 2008
17:00

Ventspils (Latvia)	4–0	(Wales) Llanelli
Kosmačovs 28'; Rimkus 30', 75'; Butriks 69'	Report

Ventspils Olimpiskais Stadions, Ventspils
Attendance: 2,000
Referee: Novo Panić (Bosnia and Herzegovina)

Ventspils won 4–1 on aggregate.

15 July 2008
19:00

Anorthosis Famagusta (Cyprus)	1–0	(Armenia) Pyunik
Frousos 71' (pen.)	Report

GSP Stadium, Nicosia (Note: Match played at GSP Stadium in Nicosia, instead of Anorthosis regular home venue Antonis Papadopoulos Stadium in Larnaca.)
Attendance: 6,685
Referee: Jérôme Efong Nzolo (Belgium)
23 July 2008
15:30

Pyunik (Armenia)	0–2	(Cyprus) Anorthosis Famagusta
	Report	Tsitaishvili 29'; Frousos 86'

Abovyan City Stadium, Abovyan (Note: Match played at Abovyan City Stadium in Abovyan, instead of Pyunik regular home venue Vazgen Sargsyan Republican Stadium in Yerevan due to renovation works.)
Attendance: 2,500
Referee: Babak Rafati (Germany)

Anorthosis Famagusta won 3–0 on aggregate.

15 July 2008
18:00

Inter Baku (Azerbaijan)	0–0	(North Macedonia) Rabotnicki
	Report

Tofiq Bahramov Republican Stadium, Baku (Note: Inter Baku played their home games at Tofiq Bahramov Republican Stadium instead of their regulat venue Shafa Stadium.)
Attendance: 15,000
Referee: Cyril Zimmermann (Switzerland)
22 July 2008
17:00

Rabotnicki (North Macedonia)	1–1	(Azerbaijan) Inter Baku
Velkoski 47'	Report	Červenka 77'

Philip II Arena, Skopje
Attendance: 5,000
Referee: Asaf Kenan (Israel)

1–1 on aggregate; Inter Baku won on away goals.

15 July 2008
18:00

Tampere United (Finland)	2–1	(Montenegro) Budućnost Podgorica
Niemi 24'; James 51' (pen.)	Report	Bećiraj 88'

Tampere Stadium, Tampere
Attendance: 5,113
Referee: Aleksei Nikolaev (Russia)
23 July 2008
20:00

Budućnost Podgorica (Montenegro)	1–1	(Finland) Tampere United
Bećiraj 80'	Report	Myntti 8'

Podgorica City Stadium, Podgorica
Attendance: 7,278
Referee: Jiří Jech (Czech Republic)

Tampere United won 3–2 on aggregate.

15 July 2008
19:00

F91 Dudelange (Luxembourg)	0–1	(Slovenia) Domžale
	Report	Benko 47'

Stade Jos Nosbaum, Dudelange
Attendance: 1,313
Referee: Leontios Trattou (Cyprus)
23 July 2008
20:45

Domžale (Slovenia)	2–0	(Luxembourg) F91 Dudelange
Žinko 65', 85'	Report

Sports Park, Domžale
Attendance: 615
Referee: Valery Vyalichka (Belarus)

Domžale won 3–0 on aggregate.

15 July 2008
20:00

Dinamo Tirana (Albania)	0–2	(Bosnia and Herzegovina) Modriča Maxima
	Report	Miljković 65'; Stokić 79'

Qemal Stafa Stadium, Tirana
Attendance: 2,200
Referee: Saïd Ennjimi (France)
23 July 2008
20:00

Modriča Maxima (Bosnia and Herzegovina)	2–1	(Albania) Dinamo Tirana
Zafirović 90'; Bojić 90+2'	Report	Xhafaj 72'

Bilino Polje Stadium, Zenica (Note: Modriča Maxima played their home matches at Bilino Polje Stadium in Zenica, instead of their regular home venue Maxima Stadium in Modriča.)
Attendance: 957
Referee: Simon Lee Evans (Wales)

Modriča Maxima won 4–1 on aggregate.

16 July 2008
17:00

Aktobe (Kazakhstan)	1–0	(Moldova) Sheriff Tiraspol
Smakov 47' (pen.)	Report

Aktobe Central Stadium, Aktobe
Attendance: 12,500
Referee: Luc Wouters (Belgium)
22 July 2008
19:00

Sheriff Tiraspol (Moldova)	4–0	(Kazakhstan) Aktobe
Kuchuk 65'; Alexeev 76'; Yerokhin 78'; Picușceac 90'	Report

Sheriff Stadium, Tiraspol
Attendance: 5,715
Referee: Robert Krajnc (Slovenia)

Sheriff Tiraspol won 4–1 on aggregate.

16 July 2008
20:45

Drogheda United (Republic of Ireland)	2–1	(Estonia) Levadia Tallinn
Cahill 50'; Kuduzović 68'	Report	Kink 23'

Dalymount Park, Dublin (Note: Played in Dublin at Dalymount Park as Drogheda's United Park did not meet UEFA criteria.)
Attendance: 2,135
Referee: Gabriele Rossi (San Marino)
23 July 2008
17:30

Levadia Tallinn (Estonia)	0–1	(Republic of Ireland) Drogheda United
	Report	Gartland 47'

Kadriorg Stadium, Tallinn
Attendance: 1,500
Referee: Boško Jovanetic (Serbia)

Drogheda United won 3–1 on aggregate.

15 July 2008
18:00

BATE Borisov (Belarus)	2–0	(Iceland) Valur
Bliznyuk 73', 78'	Report

City Stadium, Borisov
Attendance: 5,200
Referee: Stefan Messner (Austria)
23 July 2008
21:15

Valur (Iceland)	0–1	(Belarus) BATE Borisov
	Report	Stasevich 1'

Vodafonevöllurinn, Reykjavík
Attendance: 548
Referee: Hannes Kaasik (Finland)

BATE Borisov won 3–0 on aggregate.

== Second qualifying round ==
The draw for the second qualifying round took place on 1 July 2008 in Nyon, Switzerland, immediately after the draw for the first qualifying round.

=== Seeding ===
In the draw for the second qualifying round, teams were divided into two pots, on the basis of UEFA coefficients.

Seeded		Unseeded	
(Scotland) Rangers (Greece) Panathinaikos (Switzerland) Basel (Turkey) Fenerbahçe (Belgium) Anderlecht (Czech Republic) Sparta Prague (Ukraine) Dynamo Kyiv	(Serbia) Partizan (Croatia) Dinamo Zagreb (Poland) Wisła Kraków (Slovakia) Artmedia Petržalka (Denmark) AaB (Norway) Brann (Austria) Rapid Wien	(Slovenia) Domžale (Israel) Beitar Jerusalem (Hungary) MTK Budapest (Sweden) IFK Göteborg (Cyprus) Anorthosis Famagusta (Finland) Tampere United (Georgia (country)) Dinamo Tbilisi	(Latvia) Ventspils (Azerbaijan) Inter Baku (Bosnia and Herzegovina) Modriča Maxima (Lithuania) Kaunas (Moldova) Sheriff Tiraspol (Republic of Ireland) Drogheda United (Belarus) BATE Borisov

Notes

1. ^{†} Winners of the previous qualifying round whose identity was not known at the time of the draw. Teams in italics defeated a team with a higher coefficient in the previous qualifying round, thus effectively taking the coefficient of their defeated opponent in the draw for this round.

=== Summary ===
The first legs were played on 29 and 30 July, while the second legs were played on 5 and 6 August 2008.

Three of the 14 ties were won by the team with the lower UEFA coefficient: Kaunas (unranked, coefficient 2.640) beat Rangers (ranked 24, coefficient 66.013); BATE Borisov (unranked, 1.760) beat Anderlecht (56, 41.810); and Anorthosis Famagusta (ranked 193) beat Rapid Wien (ranked 166). Of the 28 teams in the second qualifying round, Panathinaikos were the only one to qualify for the knockout phase of the competition.

Team 1	Agg.	Team 2	1st leg	2nd leg
Rangers (Scotland)	1–2	(Lithuania) Kaunas	0–0	1–2
Brann (Norway)	2–2 (a)	(Latvia) Ventspils	1–0	1–2
Inter Baku (Azerbaijan)	1–3	(Serbia) Partizan	1–1	0–2
Tampere United (Finland)	3–7	(Slovakia) Artmedia Petržalka	1–3	2–4
Anorthosis Famagusta (Cyprus)	4–3	(Austria) Rapid Wien	3–0	1–3
Domžale (Slovenia)	2–6	(Croatia) Dinamo Zagreb	0–3	2–3
Panathinaikos (Greece)	3–0	(Georgia (country)) Dinamo Tbilisi	3–0	0–0
IFK Göteborg (Sweden)	3–5	(Switzerland) Basel	1–1	2–4
Sheriff Tiraspol (Moldova)	0–3	(Czech Republic) Sparta Prague	0–1	0–2
Drogheda United (Republic of Ireland)	3–4	(Ukraine) Dynamo Kyiv	1–2	2–2
Anderlecht (Belgium)	3–4	(Belarus) BATE Borisov	1–2	2–2
Beitar Jerusalem (Israel)	2–6	(Poland) Wisła Kraków	2–1	0–5
Fenerbahçe (Turkey)	7–0	(Hungary) MTK Budapest	2–0	5–0
AaB (Denmark)	7–1	(Bosnia and Herzegovina) Modriča Maxima	5–0	2–1

=== Matches ===
30 July 2008
20:45

Rangers (Scotland)	0–0	(Lithuania) Kaunas
	Report

Ibrox Stadium, Glasgow
Attendance: 38,283
Referee: Kevin Blom (Netherlands)
5 August 2008
19:05

Kaunas (Lithuania)	2–1	(Scotland) Rangers
Radžius 43'; Pilibaitis 86'	Report	Thomson 33'

Darius and Girėnas Stadium, Kaunas
Attendance: 5,250
Referee: Stefan Johannesson (Sweden)

Kaunas won 2–1 on aggregate.

29 July 2008
20:45

Brann (Norway)	1–0	(Latvia) Ventspils
Demba-Nyrén 87'	Report

Brann Stadion, Bergen
Attendance: 5,972
Referee: Radek Matějek (Czech Republic)
5 August 2008
17:00

Ventspils (Latvia)	2–1	(Norway) Brann
Menteshashvili 6'; Rimkus 44'	Report	Björnsson 49'

Ventspils Olimpiskais Stadions, Ventspils
Attendance: 2,000
Referee: Fritz Stuchlik (Austria)

2–2 on aggregate; Brann won on away goals.

29 July 2008
16:00

Inter Baku (Azerbaijan)	1–1	(Serbia) Partizan
Zlatinov 84'	Report	Bogunović 4'

Tofiq Bahramov Republican Stadium, Baku
Attendance: 8,500
Referee: Tomasz Mikulski (Poland)
6 August 2008
20:45

Partizan (Serbia)	2–0	(Azerbaijan) Inter Baku
Juca 61'; Diarra 83'	Report

Partizan Stadium, Belgrade
Attendance: 19,221
Referee: César Muñiz Fernández (Spain)

Partizan won 3–1 on aggregate.

30 July 2008
18:00

Tampere United (Finland)	1–3	(Slovakia) Artmedia Petržalka
Niemi 18'	Report	Pospěch 10'; Obžera 19'; Piroska 86'

Tampere Stadium, Tampere
Attendance: 9,228
Referee: Peter Sippel (Germany)
6 August 2008
20:15

Artmedia Petržalka (Slovakia)	4–2	(Finland) Tampere United
Kozák 9' (pen.); Pospěch 35'; Halenár 45'; Piroska 78'	Report	James 72' (pen.); Hjelm 79'

Národné tréningové centrum, Senec
Attendance: 1,981
Referee: Björn Kuipers (Netherlands)

Artmedia Petržalka won 7–3 on aggregate.

30 July 2008
20:30

Anorthosis Famagusta (Cyprus)	3–0	(Austria) Rapid Wien
Skopelitis 35'; Sosin 47', 90+2'	Report

Antonis Papadopoulos Stadium, Larnaca
Attendance: 8,000
Referee: Carlos Velasco Carballo (Spain)
6 August 2008
19:30

Rapid Wien (Austria)	3–1	(Cyprus) Anorthosis Famagusta
Hoffer 22'; Maierhofer 63', 66'	Report	Laban 13'

Gerhard Hanappi Stadium, Vienna
Attendance: 16,720
Referee: Peter Rasmussen (Denmark)

Anorthosis Famagusta won 4–3 on aggregate.

30 July 2008
20:45

Domžale (Slovenia)	0–3	(Croatia) Dinamo Zagreb
	Report	Vrdoljak 11'; Sammir 21' (pen.); Tadić 40'

Sports Park, Domžale
Attendance: 2,180
Referee: Tony Asumaa (Finland)
6 August 2008
20:45

Dinamo Zagreb (Croatia)	3–2	(Slovenia) Domžale
Bišćan 17'; Hrgović 50'; Drpić 84'	Report	Brezič 29'; Zec 81'

Stadion Maksimir, Zagreb
Attendance: 4,280
Referee: William Collum (Scotland)

Dinamo Zagreb won 6–2 on aggregate.

30 July 2008
20:45

Panathinaikos (Greece)	3–0	(Georgia (country)) Dinamo Tbilisi
Ivanschitz 23'; Salpingidis 45', 74'	Report

Olympic Stadium, Athens
Attendance: 50,864
Referee: Bruno Paixão (Portugal)
6 August 2008
18:00

Dinamo Tbilisi (Georgia (country))	0–0	(Greece) Panathinaikos
	Report

Boris Paichadze Stadium, Tbilisi
Attendance: 4,200
Referee: Cristian Balaj (Romania)

Panathinaikos won 3–0 on aggregate.

30 July 2008
20:15

IFK Göteborg (Sweden)	1–1	(Switzerland) Basel
Olsson 32'	Report	Huggel 26'

Ullevi, Gothenburg
Attendance: 10,914
Referee: Paolo Dondarini (Italy)
6 August 2008
20:15

Basel (Switzerland)	4–2	(Sweden) IFK Göteborg
Huggel 26'; Chipperfield 70'; Ergić 83' (pen.), 90+3'	Report	Wernbloom 19'; Söder 53'

St. Jakob-Park, Basel
Attendance: 18,846
Referee: Charles Richmond (Scotland)

Basel won 5–3 on aggregate.

30 July 2008
19:00

Sheriff Tiraspol (Moldova)	0–1	(Czech Republic) Sparta Prague
	Report	Kladrubský 74'

Sheriff Stadium, Tiraspol
Attendance: 8,300
Referee: Espen Berntsen (Norway)
6 August 2008
20:15

Sparta Prague (Czech Republic)	2–0	(Moldova) Sheriff Tiraspol
Voříšek 45'; Slepička 49'	Report

AXA Arena, Prague
Attendance: 11,479
Referee: Robert Schörgenhofer (Austria)

Sparta Prague won 3–0 on aggregate.

29 July 2008
20:45

Drogheda United (Republic of Ireland)	1–2	(Ukraine) Dynamo Kyiv
Hughes 47'	Report	Mykhalyk 23'; Aliyev 86'

Dalymount Park, Dublin
Attendance: 4,545
Referee: Svein Oddvar Moen (Norway)
6 August 2008
18:00

Dynamo Kyiv (Ukraine)	2–2	(Republic of Ireland) Drogheda United
Aliyev 13'; Milevskyi 73' (pen.)	Report	Robinson 42' (pen.); Gartland 88'

Valeriy Lobanovskyi Dynamo Stadium, Kyiv
Attendance: 11,400
Referee: Cüneyt Çakır (Turkey)

Dynamo Kyiv won 4–3 on aggregate.

30 July 2008
20:30

Anderlecht (Belgium)	1–2	(Belarus) BATE Borisov
Gillet 66'	Report	Krivets 69' (pen.); Nyakhaychyk 88'

Constant Vanden Stock Stadium, Brussels
Attendance: 18,909
Referee: Aleksandar Stavrev (Macedonia)
6 August 2008
18:00

BATE Borisov (Belarus)	2–2	(Belgium) Anderlecht
Bliznyuk 18'; Rodionov 83'	Report	Biglia 22' (pen.); Polák 87'

City Stadium, Borisov
Attendance: 5,500
Referee: Alan Kelly (Republic of Ireland)

BATE Borisov won 4–3 on aggregate.

30 July 2008
20:00

Beitar Jerusalem (Israel)	2–1	(Poland) Wisła Kraków
Baruchyan 60', 79'	Report	Brożek 29'

Teddy Stadium, Jerusalem
Attendance: 17,900
Referee: Paolo Tagliavento (Italy)
6 August 2008
20:45

Wisła Kraków (Poland)	5–0	(Israel) Beitar Jerusalem
Cantoro 9'; Cléber 25' (pen.); Brożek 36'; Díaz 57'; Niedzielan 87'	Report

Stadion Miejski, Kraków
Attendance: 9,500
Referee: Duarte Gomes (Portugal)

Wisła Kraków won 6–2 on aggregate.

30 July 2008
20:00

Fenerbahçe (Turkey)	2–0	(Hungary) MTK Budapest
Roberto Carlos 15'; Şahin 58'	Report

Şükrü Saracoğlu Stadium, Istanbul
Attendance: 33,591
Referee: Serge Gumienny (Belgium)
6 August 2008
20:45

MTK Budapest (Hungary)	0–5	(Turkey) Fenerbahçe
	Report	Şentürk 5', 61', 79', 80'; Belözoğlu 66' (pen.)

Szusza Ferenc Stadion, Budapest (Note: Match played at Szusza Ferenc Stadion in Budapest, instead of MTK Budapest regular home venue Hidegkuti Nándor Stadion in Budapest.)
Attendance: 2,048
Referee: Martin Atkinson (England)

Fenerbahçe won 7–0 on aggregate.

30 July 2008
20:00

AaB (Denmark)	5–0	(Bosnia and Herzegovina) Modriča Maxima
Johansson 16'; Jakobsen 42'; Bræmer 44'; Due 53'; Cacá 89'	Report

Energi Nord Arena, Aalborg
Attendance: 6,043
Referee: Stanislav Sukhina (Russia)
6 August 2008
20:00

Modriča Maxima (Bosnia and Herzegovina)	1–2	(Denmark) AaB
Bojić 72'	Report	Due 12'; Risgård 62'

Bilino Polje Stadium, Zenica
Attendance: 270
Referee: Thorsten Kinhöfer (Germany)

AaB won 7–1 on aggregate.

== Third qualifying round ==
The draw for the third qualifying round took place on 1 August 2008 in Nyon, Switzerland.

=== Seeding ===
In the draw for the third qualifying round, teams were divided into two pots, on the basis of UEFA coefficients. The higher pot contained teams ranked 61 or higher. However, the draw was held before the second qualifying round was played, which meant that Kaunas and BATE Borisov effectively moved into the higher pot, replacing the teams they eliminated.

Seeded		Unseeded	
(England) Liverpool (Spain) Barcelona (England) Arsenal (Germany) Schalke 04 (Italy) Juventus (Lithuania) Kaunas (France) Marseille (Romania) Steaua București	(Greece) Panathinaikos (Switzerland) Basel (Greece) Olympiacos (Turkey) Fenerbahçe (Ukraine) Shakhtar Donetsk (Belarus) BATE Borisov (Italy) Fiorentina (Russia) Spartak Moscow	(Spain) Atlético Madrid (Czech Republic) Sparta Prague (Ukraine) Dynamo Kyiv (Bulgaria) Levski Sofia (Czech Republic) Slavia Prague (Turkey) Galatasaray (Serbia) Partizan (Portugal) Vitória de Guimarães	(Croatia) Dinamo Zagreb (Poland) Wisła Kraków (Belgium) Standard Liège (Netherlands) Twente (Slovakia) Artmedia Petržalka (Denmark) AaB (Norway) Brann (Cyprus) Anorthosis Famagusta

Notes

1. ^{†} Winners of the previous qualifying round whose identity was not known at the time of the draw. Teams in italics defeated a team with a higher coefficient in the previous qualifying round, thus effectively taking the coefficient of their defeated opponent in the draw for this round.

=== Summary ===
The first legs were played on 12 and 13 August, while the second legs were played on 26 and 27 August. The winners of each tie advanced to the group stage, while the losers were seeded into the 2008–09 UEFA Cup first round.

Four of the 16 ties were won by the team with the lower UEFA coefficient: Anorthosis Famagusta (ranked 193) beat Olympiacos (ranked 44); BATE Borisov (unranked, coefficient 1.760) beat Levski Sofia (ranked 80, coefficient 32.644); Atlético Madrid (ranked 67) beat Schalke 04 (ranked 22) and Dynamo Kyiv (ranked 74) beat Spartak Moscow (ranked 61).

Team 1	Agg.	Team 2	1st leg	2nd leg
Anorthosis Famagusta (Cyprus)	3–1	(Greece) Olympiacos	3–0	0–1
Vitória de Guimarães (Portugal)	1–2	(Switzerland) Basel	0–0	1–2
Shakhtar Donetsk (Ukraine)	5–1	(Croatia) Dinamo Zagreb	2–0	3–1
Schalke 04 (Germany)	1–4	(Spain) Atlético Madrid	1–0	0–4
AaB (Denmark)	4–0	(Lithuania) Kaunas	2–0	2–0
Barcelona (Spain)	4–1	(Poland) Wisła Kraków	4–0	0–1
Levski Sofia (Bulgaria)	1–2	(Belarus) BATE Borisov	0–1	1–1
Standard Liège (Belgium)	0–1	(England) Liverpool	0–0	0–1 (a.e.t.)
Partizan (Serbia)	3–4	(Turkey) Fenerbahçe	2–2	1–2
Twente (Netherlands)	0–6	(England) Arsenal	0–2	0–4
Spartak Moscow (Russia)	2–8	(Ukraine) Dynamo Kyiv	1–4	1–4
Juventus (Italy)	5–1	(Slovakia) Artmedia Petržalka	4–0	1–1
Brann (Norway)	1–3	(France) Marseille	0–1	1–2
Fiorentina (Italy)	2–0	(Czech Republic) Slavia Prague	2–0	0–0
Galatasaray (Turkey)	2–3	(Romania) Steaua București	2–2	0–1
Sparta Prague (Czech Republic)	1–3 (Note: Order of legs reversed after original draw.)	(Greece) Panathinaikos	1–2	0–1

=== Matches ===
13 August 2008
20:00

Anorthosis Famagusta (Cyprus)	3–0	(Greece) Olympiacos
Torosidis 5' (o.g.); Sosin 19'; Laban 87'	Report

Antonis Papadopoulos Stadium, Larnaca
Attendance: 9,000
Referee: Olegário Benquerença (Portugal)
27 August 2008
20:45

Olympiacos (Greece)	1–0	(Cyprus) Anorthosis Famagusta
Belluschi 54'	Report

Karaiskakis Stadium, Piraeus
Attendance: 27,922
Referee: Herbert Fandel (Germany)

Anorthosis Famagusta won 3–1 on aggregate.

13 August 2008
21:30

Vitória de Guimarães (Portugal)	0–0	(Switzerland) Basel
	Report

Estádio D. Afonso Henriques, Guimarães
Attendance: 21,452
Referee: Grzegorz Gilewski (Poland)
27 August 2008
20:15

Basel (Switzerland)	2–1	(Portugal) Vitória de Guimarães
Stocker 11'; Derdiyok 54'	Report	Fajardo 15' (pen.)

St. Jakob-Park, Basel
Attendance: 30,002
Referee: Pieter Vink (Netherlands)

Basel won 2–1 on aggregate.

13 August 2008
19:00

Shakhtar Donetsk (Ukraine)	2–0	(Croatia) Dinamo Zagreb
Srna 3'; Jádson 31'	Report

RSC Olimpiyskiy, Donetsk
Attendance: 24,810
Referee: Florian Meyer (Germany)
27 August 2008
20:45

Dinamo Zagreb (Croatia)	1–3	(Ukraine) Shakhtar Donetsk
Balaban 57'	Report	Luiz Adriano 42'; Brandão 59'; Willian 70'

Stadion Maksimir, Zagreb
Attendance: 13,655
Referee: Mike Riley (England)

Shakhtar Donetsk won 5–1 on aggregate.

13 August 2008
20:45

Schalke 04 (Germany)	1–0	(Spain) Atlético Madrid
Pander 30'	Report

Veltins-Arena, Gelsenkirchen
Attendance: 54,142
Referee: Peter Fröjdfeldt (Sweden)
27 August 2008
20:45

Atlético Madrid (Spain)	4–0	(Germany) Schalke 04
Agüero 18'; Forlán 50'; L. García 82'; Rodríguez 86' (pen.)	Report

Vicente Calderón, Madrid
Attendance: 47,321
Referee: Frank De Bleeckere (Belgium)

Atlético Madrid won 4–1 on aggregate.

13 August 2008
20:05

AaB (Denmark)	2–0	(Lithuania) Kaunas
Cacá 71'; Curth 86'	Report

Energi Nord Arena, Aalborg
Attendance: 6,310
Referee: Ivan Bebek (Croatia)
27 August 2008
19:00

Kaunas (Lithuania)	0–2	(Denmark) AaB
	Report	Risgård 75', 90+1'

Darius and Girėnas Stadium, Kaunas
Attendance: 3,000
Referee: Pedro Proença (Portugal)

AaB won 4–0 on aggregate.

13 August 2008
21:45

Barcelona (Spain)	4–0	(Poland) Wisła Kraków
Eto'o 17', 83'; Xavi 24'; Henry 49'	Report

Camp Nou, Barcelona
Attendance: 56,786
Referee: Claudio Circhetta (Switzerland)
26 August 2008
20:45

Wisła Kraków (Poland)	1–0	(Spain) Barcelona
Cléber 52'	Report

Stadion Miejski, Kraków
Attendance: 12,000
Referee: Ľuboš Micheľ (Slovakia)

Barcelona won 4–1 on aggregate.

13 August 2008
19:00

Levski Sofia (Bulgaria)	0–1	(Belarus) BATE Borisov
	Report	Rzhevsky 60'

Georgi Asparuhov Stadium, Sofia
Attendance: 16,294
Referee: Jonas Eriksson (Sweden)
27 August 2008
18:00

BATE Borisov (Belarus)	1–1	(Bulgaria) Levski Sofia
Sosnovski 14'	Report	Gadzhev 38'

City Stadium, Borisov
Attendance: 5,603
Referee: Konrad Plautz (Austria)

BATE Borisov won 2–1 on aggregate.

13 August 2008
21:05

Standard Liège (Belgium)	0–0	(England) Liverpool
	Report

Stade Maurice Dufrasne, Liège
Attendance: 26,000
Referee: Tom Henning Øvrebø (Norway)
27 August 2008
21:05

Liverpool (England)	1–0 (a.e.t.)	(Belgium) Standard Liège
Kuyt 118'	Report

Anfield, Liverpool
Attendance: 43,889
Referee: Massimo Busacca (Switzerland)

Liverpool won 1–0 on aggregate.

13 August 2008
21:00

Partizan (Serbia)	2–2	(Turkey) Fenerbahçe
Paunović 10'; Bogunović 14'	Report	Alex 45' (pen.); Güiza 50'

Partizan Stadium, Belgrade
Attendance: 22,274
Referee: Craig Thomson (Scotland)
27 August 2008
20:00

Fenerbahçe (Turkey)	2–1	(Serbia) Partizan
Şentürk 28'; Alex 58'	Report	Tošić 76'

Şükrü Saracoğlu Stadium, Istanbul
Attendance: 36,765
Referee: Manuel Mejuto González (Spain)

Fenerbahçe won 4–3 on aggregate.

13 August 2008
20:45

Twente (Netherlands)	0–2	(England) Arsenal
	Report	Gallas 63'; Adebayor 82'

GelreDome, Arnhem
Attendance: 26,000
Referee: Alberto Undiano Mallenco (Spain)
27 August 2008
21:05

Arsenal (England)	4–0	(Netherlands) Twente
Nasri 27'; Gallas 52'; Walcott 66'; Bendtner 89'	Report

Emirates Stadium, London
Attendance: 59,583
Referee: Terje Hauge (Norway)

Arsenal won 6–0 on aggregate.

13 August 2008
18:00

Spartak Moscow (Russia)	1–4	(Ukraine) Dynamo Kyiv
Bazhenov 5'	Report	Bangoura 28', 47'; Milevskyi 45', 86'

Luzhniki Stadium, Moscow
Attendance: 32,600
Referee: Martin Hansson (Sweden)
27 August 2008
19:45

Dynamo Kyiv (Ukraine)	4–1	(Russia) Spartak Moscow
Aliyev 4'; Bangoura 24'; Milevskyi 49', 78'	Report	Dzyuba 47'

Valeriy Lobanovskyi Dynamo Stadium, Kyiv
Attendance: 15,000
Referee: Roberto Rosetti (Italy)

Dynamo Kyiv won 8–2 on aggregate.

13 August 2008
20:45

Juventus (Italy)	4–0	(Slovakia) Artmedia Petržalka
Camoranesi 8'; Del Piero 26'; Chiellini 39'; Legrottaglie 90'	Report

Stadio Olimpico, Turin
Attendance: 23,102
Referee: Kyros Vassaras (Greece)
26 August 2008
20:45

Artmedia Petržalka (Slovakia)	1–1	(Italy) Juventus
Fodrek 13'	Report	Amauri 25'

Tehelné pole, Bratislava
Attendance: 13,450
Referee: Luis Medina Cantalejo (Spain)

Juventus won 5–1 on aggregate.

13 August 2008
20:45

Brann (Norway)	0–1	(France) Marseille
	Report	Cheyrou 40'

Brann Stadion, Bergen
Attendance: 11,197
Referee: Alexandru Tudor (Romania)
27 August 2008
20:45

Marseille (France)	2–1	(Norway) Brann
Niang 65', 90'	Report	Sigurðsson 74'

Stade Vélodrome, Marseille
Attendance: 44,641
Referee: Eric Braamhaar (Netherlands)

Marseille won 3–1 on aggregate.

12 August 2008
20:45

Fiorentina (Italy)	2–0	(Czech Republic) Slavia Prague
Mutu 3'; Gilardino 57'	Report

Stadio Artemio Franchi, Florence
Attendance: 32,146
Referee: Howard Webb (England)
27 August 2008
20:45

Slavia Prague (Czech Republic)	0–0	(Italy) Fiorentina
	Report

Synot Tip Arena, Prague
Attendance: 14,943
Referee: Bertrand Layec (France)

Fiorentina won 2–0 on aggregate.

13 August 2008
20:15

Galatasaray (Turkey)	2–2	(Romania) Steaua București
Nonda 19', 47'	Report	Moreno 5'; Nicoliță 13'

Ali Sami Yen Stadium, Istanbul
Attendance: 19,636
Referee: Laurent Duhamel (France)
27 August 2008
19:45

Steaua București (Romania)	1–0	(Turkey) Galatasaray
Nicoliță 57'	Report

Stadionul Steaua, Bucharest
Attendance: 22,850
Referee: Matteo Trefoloni (Italy)

Steaua București won 3–2 on aggregate.

13 August 2008
20:45

Sparta Prague (Czech Republic)	1–2	(Greece) Panathinaikos
Kulič 30'	Report	Kučera 24' (o.g.); Simão 60'

AXA Arena, Prague
Attendance: 14,478
Referee: Yuri Baskakov (Russia)
26 August 2008
20:45

Panathinaikos (Greece)	1–0	(Czech Republic) Sparta Prague
Souza 89'	Report

Olympic Stadium, Athens
Attendance: 59,659
Referee: Alain Hamer (Luxembourg)

Panathinaikos won 3–1 on aggregate.
