= Aloneftis =

Aloneftis is a surname. Notable people with the surname include:

- Efstathios Aloneftis (born 1983), Cypriot footballer
- Giorgos Aloneftis (born 1976), Cypriot footballer
