= Arjan Beqaj =

Albanian footballer

Personal information
- Full name: Arjan Nexhat Beqaj
- Date of birth: 25 August 1975 (age 51)
- Place of birth: Prizren, SFR Yugoslavia (modern Kosovo)
- Height: 1.88 m (6 ft 2 in)
- Position: Goalkeeper

Youth career
- Liria Prizren

Senior career*
Years	Team	Apps	(Gls)
1992–1995	Liria Prizren		
1995–1997	Partizani	37	(0)
1997–2003	OFI	129	(1)
2003–2006	Ionikos	83	(0)
2006–2010	Anorthosis Famagusta	94	(0)
2010–2011	Olympiakos Nicosia	5	(0)
2011	Ermis Aradippou	0	(0)

International career
1998–2011	Albania	43	(0)

Managerial career
- 2011–2016: Anorthosis (goalkeeping coach)
- 2016–2022: Cyprus (goalkeeping coach)
- 2023-: AEK Larnaca FC (goalkeeping coach)
- * Club domestic league appearances and goals

Arjan Beqaj (born 25 August 1975 in Prizren) is a former professional footballer who played as a goalkeeper. He is now the goalkeeping coach at Anorthosis Famagusta. Born in Yugoslavia, he represented Albania internationally.

In a career spanning 19 years he played for seven clubs in four countries. He is also a former Albanian international, earning 43 caps from 1998 to 2011.

== Club career ==
=== Early career ===
Beqaj began his profession career in Kosovo with local side Liria Prizren in 1992. He then moved to Tirana, Albania at the start of 1995 to attend university, where he was to play for Partizani Tirana. He played in Albania for two and a half years as he left in 1997 to join OFI after being spotted playing for Albania U-21s.

=== Greece ===
He spent six seasons at OFI, where he played 129 league games for the Greek side and even scoring a goal in the 2000–01 season. Beqaj then signed for Ionikos where he made 83 league appearances in three seasons before ending his nine-year stint in Greece.

=== Anorthosis Famagusta ===
Beqaj was one of the most important players that helped Anorthosis Famagusta reach the group stages of the UEFA Champions League for the first time in history in the 2008–09 season.

The team started their campaign in the first qualifying round where they faced Armenia's Pyunik. It was an easy task for Anorthosis who won both matches with Beqaj keeping two clean sheets. In the next round against Rapid Wien, Beqaj kept a clean-sheet in the first leg but was beaten three times in the second leg but nevertheless Anorthosis progressed 4–3 on aggregate.

Beqaj was named man of the match in the second leg of third qualifying round against Olympiacos, making several vital saves in a 1–0 narrow loss which was enough to clinch to qualification to group stage after a 3–0 win in the first leg. By doing so, Anorthosis made history by becoming the first Cypriot team to ever qualify for the Champions League group stages.

== International career ==
Beqaj was one of the first Kosovo Albanians to be part of the Albania national team, having made his debut on 20 January 1998 in a 4–1 win in the friendly against Turkey. During the next years, he served as Foto Strakosha's understudy, only appearing in friendly matches. After Strakosha's retirement in 2005, Beqaj finally became the main keeper, playing regularly in the team's UEFA Euro 2008 qualifying campaign. He lost his place in 2011 to the youngster Samir Ujkani. His 43rd and last appearance, a 4–0 defeat away to Argentina, was his first and only appearance as captain.

== Career statistics ==
=== Club ===
Club performance			League		Cup		Continental		Total	
Season	Club	League	Apps	Goals	Apps	Goals	Apps	Goals	Apps	Goals
Albania			League		Albanian Cup		Europe		Total	
1994-95	Partizani Tirana	Superliga	2	0					2	0
1995-96	Partizani Tirana	Superliga	18	0					18	0
1996-97	Partizani Tirana	Superliga	17	0					17	0
Greece			League		Greek Cup		Europe		Total	
1997-98	OFI	Alpha Ethniki	4	0					4	0
1998-99	OFI	Alpha Ethniki	32	0					32	0
1999-00	OFI	Alpha Ethniki	27	0					27	0
2000-01	OFI	Alpha Ethniki	28	1					28	1
2001-02	OFI	Alpha Ethniki	20	0					20	0
2002-03	OFI	Alpha Ethniki	18	0					20	0
2003-04	Ionikos	Alpha Ethniki	28	0					28	0
2004-05	Ionikos	Alpha Ethniki	27	0					27	0
2005-06	Ionikos	Alpha Ethniki	28	0					28	0
Cyprus			League		Cypriot Cup		Europe		Total	
2006-07	Anorthosis Famagusta	First Division	26	0					26	0
2007-08	Anorthosis Famagusta	First Division	27	0			5	0	32	0
2008-09	Anorthosis Famagusta	First Division	10	0			11	0	21	0
2009-10	Anorthosis Famagusta	First Division	19	0					19	0
2010-11	Olympiakos Nicosia	First Division	5	0					5	0
2010-11	Ermis Aradippou	First Division	0	0					0	0
Total	Albania		37	0					37	0
Total	Greece		212	1					212	1
Total	Cyprus		88	0					88	0
Career total			m	n	m	n	m	n	m	n

=== International ===
Appearances and goals by national team and year
National team	Year	Apps	Goals
Albania	1998	2	0
Albania	1999	2	0
Albania	2000	4	0
Albania	2001	2	0
Albania	2002	3	0
Albania	2003	4	0
Albania	2004	0	0
Albania	2005	0	0
Albania	2006	3	0
Albania	2007	11	0
Albania	2008	5	0
Albania	2009	0	0
Albania	2010	5	0
Albania	2011	2	0
Total		43	0

== Honours ==
=== Club ===
Partizani Tirana

- Albanian Cup: 1996–97

Anorthosis Famagusta

- Cypriot First Division: 2007–08
- Cypriot Cup: 2006–07
- LTV Super Cup: 2007

=== Individual ===
- Albanian Footballer of the Year: 2008
