= Theodoros Tripotseris =

Greek footballer

Thodoris Tripotseris
Personal information
- Full name: Theodoros Tripotseris
- Date of birth: 4 March 1986 (age 40)
- Place of birth: Athens, Greece
- Height: 1.84 m (6 ft 0 in)
- Position: Centre back

Youth career
- Panathinaikos

Senior career*
Years	Team	Apps	(Gls)
2004–2006	Panathinaikos	0	(0)
2006–2008	Anorthosis	51	(1)
2008–2009	Levadiakos	22	(1)
2009–2010	AEL	8	(0)
2010–2011	Levadiakos	31	(2)
2011–2012	Doxa Dramas	27	(0)
2012–2013	Kavala	40	(0)
2013–2015	OFI	55	(0)
2015–2018	Levadiakos	79	(1)
2018–2019	AEL	0	(0)
2019	Ialysos	8	(0)
2020	Kalamata	9	(0)
2021	Aspropyrgos	14	(0)
Total		344	(5)

International career
2005	Greece U19	3	(0)
2006–2007	Greece U21	7	(1)
- * Club domestic league appearances and goals as of 30 October 2025

Theodoros Tripotseris (Greek: Θεόδωρος Τριποτσέρης; born 4 March 1986) is a Greek former professional footballer.

== Career ==
Born in Athens, Tripotseris began playing football for local side Panathinaikos in 2004. Thereafter he played for Anorthosis, Levadiakos, AEL, Doxa Drama, Kavala and OFI.
