= Giorgos Aloneftis =

Cypriot footballer (born 1976)

Personal information
- Full name: Georgios Aloneftis
- Date of birth: January 3, 1976 (age 50)
- Place of birth: Nicosia, Cyprus
- Height: 1.77 m (5 ft 10 in)
- Position: Midfielder

Senior career*
Years	Team	Apps	(Gls)
1992–2002	APOEL	86	(9)
Total		86	(9)
- * Club domestic league appearances and goals

Giorgos Aloneftis (Greek: Γιώργος Αλωνεύτης; born January 3, 1976) is a Cypriot former football midfielder who played his entire club career for APOEL.
