= Predrag Ocokoljić =

Serbian footballer (born 1977)

Personal information
- Full name: Predrag Ocokoljić
- Date of birth: 29 July 1977 (age 49)
- Place of birth: Belgrade, SFR Yugoslavia
- Height: 1.87 m (6 ft 2 in)
- Position: Right-back

Senior career*
Years	Team	Apps	(Gls)
1997–1998	Radnički Niš	26	(1)
1998–2003	Obilić	98	(4)
2002	→ Shakhtar Donetsk (loan)	1	(0)
2002	→ Shakhtar-2 Donetsk (loan)	5	(1)
2003–2005	Toulouse	36	(0)
2005–2006	Châteauroux	16	(0)
2007–2008	AEL Limassol	24	(0)
2008–2010	Anorthosis	43	(1)
2010–2011	Ethnikos Achna	14	(0)
2011	Rad	11	(0)
Total		274	(7)

International career
1999	FR Yugoslavia U21	4	(0)
2003–2004	Serbia and Montenegro	2	(0)
- * Club domestic league appearances and goals

Predrag Ocokoljić (Serbian Cyrillic: Предраг Оцокољић; born 29 July 1977) is a Serbian former professional footballer who played as a defender.

He earned two caps for Serbia and Montenegro, playing in friendly matches in 2003 and 2004.

== Personal life ==
Ocokoljić is married to Lidija Veličković, the sister of Serbian singer Ceca.
