= José Daniel Álvarez =

Argentine footballer

Personal information
- Date of birth: 21 March 1975 (age 51)
- Position: Midfielder

Senior career*
Years	Team	Apps	(Gls)
1993–1994	Belgrano		
2000–2003	Racing de Córdoba		
2003–2004	Talleres de Perico		
2005–2007	FC Rànger's		
2007–2010	FC Santa Coloma		
- * Club domestic league appearances and goals

José Daniel Álvarez (born 21 March 1975) is an Argentine former professional footballer who played as a midfielder.

== Career ==
Álvarez played in Argentina and Andorra for Belgrano, Racing de Córdoba, Talleres de Perico, FC Rànger's and FC Santa Coloma.
