= Lambros Lambrou (footballer) =

Cypriot footballer (born 1977)

Personal information
- Full name: Lambros Lambrou
- Date of birth: September 9, 1977 (age 49)
- Place of birth: Famagusta, Cyprus
- Height: 1.86 m (6 ft 1 in)
- Position: Defender

Senior career*
Years	Team	Apps	(Gls)
1997–1998	Ethnikos Achnas	17	(1)
1998–1999	Anorthosis	19	(0)
1999–2006	Ethnikos Achnas	152	(26)
2006–2009	Anorthosis	40	(1)
2009–2010	Ermis Aradippou	25	(1)
2010–2011	Nea Salamina	24	(0)

International career^{‡}
2003–2008	Cyprus	34	(0)
- * Club domestic league appearances and goals as of July 2009 ‡ National team caps and goals as of 22 August 2008

Lambros Lambrou (born September 9, 1977) is a Cypriot former international football defender who last played for Nea Salamis Famagusta FC and previously for Ermis Aradippou and the national team of Cyprus. In the past he played also for Ethnikos Achnas and Anorthosis.
