= Georgios Georgiou =

Greek footballer

Personal information
- Full name: Georgios Lambros Georgiou
- Date of birth: 24 September 1979 (age 47)
- Place of birth: Augsburg, Germany
- Height: 1.91 m (6 ft 3 in)
- Position: Centre back

Senior career*
Years	Team	Apps	(Gls)
1995–1998	Lamia	17	(0)
1997–1998	→ APOK Velouchi (loan)		
1998–2002	Panetolikos	52	(1)
2002–2005	Kerkyra	23	(1)
2005–2008	Atromitos	60	(0)
2008–2010	Anorthosis Famagusta	35	(0)
2010–2012	OFI	46	(2)
2012–2014	Levadiakos	40	(2)
2014–2015	Apollon Smyrnis	0	(0)
2015–	A.E. Kifisia		
- * Club domestic league appearances and goals as of 15:49, 9 January 2014 (UTC)

Georgios Georgiou (Greek: Γιώργος Γεωργίου; born 24 September 1979) is a Greek footballer who currently plays for A.E. Kifisia in the Football League 2 as a centre back.

== Career ==
Born in Augsburg, Germany, Georgiou moved to Greece where he played football for Lamia.

Georgiou could not score in 58 games for Atromitos, but scored in his official OFI debut against Atromitos.
