= Giorgos Theodotou =

Cypriot footballer (born 1974)

Personal information
- Full name: Giorgos Theodotou
- Date of birth: January 1, 1974 (age 52)
- Place of birth: Famagusta, Cyprus
- Height: 1.78 m (5 ft 10 in)
- Position: Defender

Youth career
- EPA Larnaca

Senior career*
Years	Team	Apps	(Gls)
1990–1994	EPA Larnaca	44	(0)
1994–2000	AEK Larnaca	116	(12)
2000–2008	AC Omonia	150	(10)
2008–2009	Anorthosis	3	(0)

International career^{‡}
1996–2007	Cyprus	70	(0)
- * Club domestic league appearances and goals as of July 9, 2009 ‡ National team caps and goals as of August 22, 2008

Georgos Theodotou (Greek: Γiώργος Θεοδότου) (born January 1, 1974, in Famagusta) is a Cypriot football defender. He last played for Anorthosis of Cyprus. His former teams are AC Omonia, AEK Larnaca and EPA Larnaca, where he started his career.
