= Zacharias Charalambous =

Cypriot footballer (born 1971)

Personal information
- Full name: Zacharias Charalambous
- Date of birth: March 25, 1971 (age 55)
- Place of birth: Famagusta, Cyprus
- Position: Defender

Senior career*
Years	Team	Apps	(Gls)
1992–2001	Anorthosis Famagusta	205	(15)
2001–2005	APOEL	70	(0)
Total		275	(15)

International career^{‡}
1994–2001	Cyprus	11	(1)
- * Club domestic league appearances and goals as of 17 April 2008 ‡ National team caps and goals as of 17 April 2008

Zacharias Charalambous (Greek: Ζαχαρίας Χαραλάμπους) (born March 25, 1971) is a former international Cypriot football defender.

He started his career in 1986 from Digenis Akritas Ypsonas. In 1992, he went to Anorthosis Famagusta and spent his career mainly in Anorthosis Famagusta where he played for nine years. Then, he joined APOEL for four years, where he ended his career in 2005.
