= Cafú (footballer, born 1977) =

Cape Verdean footballer (born 1977)

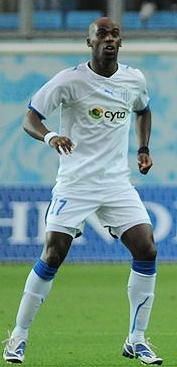
- Cafú in action for Anorthosis in 2010

Personal information
- Full name: Arlindo Gomes Semedo
- Date of birth: 17 November 1977 (age 48)
- Place of birth: Lisbon, Portugal
- Height: 1.77 m (5 ft 10 in)
- Position: Forward

Youth career
- 1994–1997: Almada

Senior career*
Years	Team	Apps	(Gls)
1997–1998	Almada		
1998–1999	Amora	29	(11)
1999–2002	Belenenses	60	(8)
2002–2005	Boavista	93	(9)
2006	Sportfreunde Siegen	13	(5)
2006–2007	SC Freiburg	23	(1)
2008–2009	Omonia	41	(9)
2009–2011	Anorthosis	58	(24)
2011–2012	AEL Limassol	29	(4)
2012–2013	Alki Larnaca	27	(4)
2013–2014	Académico Viseu	35	(15)
2014–2015	Feirense	42	(6)
2015–2016	Freamunde	28	(2)
2016–2017	Salgueiros	24	(6)
2017–2021	Maia Lidador	85	(30)
Total		587	(134)

International career
2003–2007	Cape Verde	15	(5)
- * Club domestic league appearances and goals

Arlindo Gomes Semedo (born 17 November 1977), known as Cafú, is a Cape Verdean former professional footballer who played as a forward.

After playing in his country of birth for Belenenses and Boavista, amassing Primeira Liga totals of 153 games and 17 goals over seven seasons, he went on to have a brief spell in Germany with Freiburg. He moved to Cyprus already in his 30s, where he remained for five years in representation of several teams.

Internationally, Cafú played for Cape Verde.

== Club career ==
Cafú was born in Lisbon, Portugal. During his early career he played for Almada AC, Amora FC, C.F. Os Belenenses – with which he made his Primeira Liga debut in the 1999–2000 season– and Boavista FC, appearing in six games in the Porto team's quarter-final run in the UEFA Cup in 2002–03 but starting rarely in his three-and-a-half-year stint with the club.

In January 2006, Cafú moved to Sportfreunde Siegen in Germany's 2. Bundesliga, his five league goals not being enough to avoid relegation (as last). He subsequently stayed in that level and signed for SC Freiburg, where he would feature sparingly.

Again in the January transfer window, Cafú joined Cyprus' AC Omonia. After one and a half seasons he moved sides but stayed in the country, agreeing to a contract at Anorthosis Famagusta FC on a free transfer in summer 2009; at the start of his second season, in the Europa league third qualifying round, he scored a hat-trick against Cercle Brugge KSV (3–1 home win), being essential in a 3–2 aggregate victory and play-off stage qualification.

In his two-year spell with Anorthosis, Cafú scored always in double digits but his team came out empty in silverware, respectively finishing second and third in the Cypriot First Division. In June 2011, aged 33, he was released, signing shortly after with AEL Limassol.

Cafú returned to Portugal after leaving Alki Larnaca FC, going on to spend one season apiece in the Segunda Liga with Académico de Viseu FC, C.D. Feirense and S.C. Freamunde and scoring a career-best 15 goals (17 in all competitions) during his spell at the first club.
