= Nikos Katsavakis =

Greek footballer

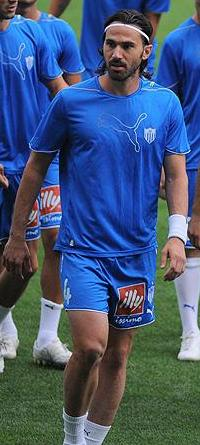

Personal information
- Full name: Nikolaos Katsavakis
- Date of birth: 16 May 1979 (age 47)
- Place of birth: Serres, Greece
- Height: 1.82 m (6 ft 0 in)
- Position: Center back

Senior career*
| Years | Team | Apps | (Gls) |
| 1996–1997 | Veria | 12 | (1) |
| 1997–1999 | Kavala | 14 | (0) |
| 2000–2002 | Panserraikos | 46 | (2) |
| 2002–2004 | Digenis Morphou | 46 | (2) |
| 2004–2010 | Anorthosis Famagusta | 130 | (11) |
| 2010–2012 | Apollon Limassol | 15 | (1) |
| 2012–2013 | Ethnikos Gazoros | 23 | (2) |
| 2013–2014 | Panserraikos | | |

International career
| 2011 | Cyprus | 1 | (0) |
- * Club domestic league appearances and goals as of 2 August 2013

Nikos Katsavakis (Greek: Νίκος Κατσαβάκης; born 16 May 1979) is a retired Greek and Cypriot footballer. He last played as a defender for Panserraikos and aspires to become a professional football trainer, like his father Makis Katsavakis. Nikos Katsavakis has one cap with the Cyprus national football team.

== Career ==
Born in Serres, Katsavakis began playing football with local side Serres 85. He joined Super League Greece side Veria F.C. in July 1996. He joined Kavala F.C. the next season, and would appear in 14 Super League matches for the club.
