= Andreas Constantinou =

Cypriot footballer (born 1980)

Personal information
- Full name: Andreas Constantinou
- Date of birth: October 12, 1980 (age 46)
- Place of birth: Nicosia, Cyprus
- Height: 1.86 m (6 ft 1 in)
- Position: Defender

Team information
- Current team: Enosis Neon Paralimni
- Number: 24

Senior career*
Years	Team	Apps	(Gls)
2000–2002	AC Omonia	32	(0)
2002–2003	Alki Larnaca	11	(0)
2003–2004	AC Omonia	2	(0)
2004–2007	AEK Larnaca	51	(4)
2007–2010	Anorthosis	51	(3)
2010–2011	Alki Larnaca	4	(0)
2012–2015	Enosis Neon Paralimni	11	(1)

International career^{‡}
2005–2009	Cyprus	7	(0)
- * Club domestic league appearances and goals as of 17 July 2009 ‡ National team caps and goals as of 22 August 2008

Andreas Constantinou (Greek: Ανδρέας Κωνσταντίνου; born October 12, 1980) is a Cypriot football defender who last played for Enosis Neon Paralimni. He was a member of Cyprus national team.

Constantinou started his career in AC Omonia. He also played for Alki Larnaca and AEK Larnaca. He medially played again in AC Omonia. In June 2007, he signed a two-year deal with Anorthosis. Anorthosis released the player in 2010, and on 25 August he signed a contract with Alki Larnaca FC.
