= Jeffrey Leiwakabessy =

Dutch footballer

Personal information
- Full name: Jeffrey Leiwakabessy
- Date of birth: 23 February 1981 (age 45)
- Place of birth: Elst, Netherlands
- Height: 1.71 m (5 ft 7 in)
- Position: Left back

Youth career
- Elistha Elst
- 1993–1998: NEC

Senior career*
Years	Team	Apps	(Gls)
1998–2006	NEC	150	(0)
2006–2008	Alemannia Aachen	60	(0)
2008–2012	Anorthosis	100	(3)
2012–2013	VVV	35	(0)
2013–2017	NEC	58	(0)
Total		403	(3)
- * Club domestic league appearances and goals

Jeffrey Leiwakabessy (born 23 February 1981) is a Dutch former professional footballer who played as a left back.

== Club career ==
Born in Elst, Gelderland, Leiwakabessy played his first professional seasons with NEC Nijmegen. In 2006–07 he moved to Alemannia Aachen in Germany, which had just returned to the Bundesliga after a four-decade absence; during the campaign he appeared in all 34 league matches, but could not help prevent the team's immediate relegation.

After one more season in Aachen, Leiwakabessy joined Anorthosis Famagusta FC in the Cypriot First Division. He went on to feature in twelve 2008–09 UEFA Champions League games as the side overachieved in the group stage, even though it was eventually ousted as last.

On 4 January 2012, Leiwakabessy returned to his country and signed a one-year contract with VVV-Venlo in the Eredivisie. On 15 October of the following year, after a period of trial, he joined former club NEC until the end of the campaign.

== Honours ==
NEC

- Eerste Divisie: 2014–15
