= Siniša Dobrašinović =

Montenegrin-Cypriot football player (born 1977)

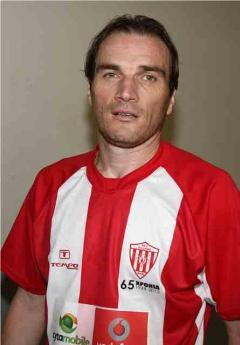

Personal information
- Date of birth: 17 February 1977 (age 49)
- Place of birth: Ivangrad, SR Montenegro, Yugoslavia
- Height: 1.87 m (6 ft 2 in)
- Position: Defensive midfielder

Senior career*
Years	Team	Apps	(Gls)
1997–1998	Rudar Pljevlja	38	(3)
1998–2000	Lokeren	2	(1)
2000–2002	Apollon Limassol	38	(8)
2003–2005	Digenis Morphou	61	(11)
2005–2008	Omonia	45	(8)
2008–2009	Anorthosis	38	(3)
2009–2010	Kavala	20	(2)
2010–2012	Alki Larnaca	57	(7)
2012–2013	FC Zhetysu	18	(1)
2013–2014	Nea Salamina	32	(1)
Total		406	(49)

International career
2009–2014	Cyprus	29	(1)

Managerial career
- 2015: Aris
- 2017–2019: Cyprus (assistant)
- 2021: Ermis Aradippou
- 2022: Al Wahda SC
- 2023: Novi Pazar
- 2024: Železničar Pančevo
- 2025: Radnički Niš
- * Club domestic league appearances and goals

Siniša Dobrašinović (Greek: Σίνισα Ντομπρασίνοβιτς, Serbian Cyrillic: Синиша Добрашиновић; born 17 February 1977) is a professional football coach and former player who played as a defensive midfielder. Born in Yugoslavia, he played for the Cyprus national team.

== Playing career ==
=== Club ===
Dobrašinović started his career playing for FK Rudar Pljevlja, and made his first attempt abroad at K.S.C. Lokeren. He later tried his luck at Cyprus, which was a crucial decision, since spent most his career playing at the Cyprus First Division.

He played in various Cypriot teams, but his best years was playing for AC Omonia and Anorthosis. While playing at Anorthosis in the Champions League, became the first player to score in a Cypriot kit.

In his later years as footballer he played at Greek club Kavala. and FC Zhetysu of Kazakhstan.

=== International ===
Despite being born in Ivangrad, SR Montenegro, then part of SFR Yugoslavia, Dobrasinović has opted to accept the call to represent the Cypriot national team. He was playing in Cyprus since 2000, and in 2009 took the Cypriot citizenship. He made his debut for Cyprus on 10 October 2009 against Bulgaria in a 4–1 win and has earned a total of 28 caps, scoring 1 goal. His final international was a May 2014 Kirin Cup match against hosts Japan.

=== International goals ===
Scores and results list Cyprus's goal tally first

Goal	Date	Venue	Opponent	Score	Result	Competition
1	10 August 2011	Neo GSP Stadium, Nicosia	Moldova	3–2	3–2	Friendly

== Managerial career ==
By the end of the season 2013/14 Dobrašinović decided to put an end to his career as player and become a manager. On 23 January 2015, he was announced as first manager for Aris. Later, in 2017 he was an assistant coach in the Cypriot National Team until 2019. In 2021, he coached F.C.Ermis.

== Managerial statistics ==
16 April 2024

Team	From	To	Record				
Team	From	To	G	W	D	L	Win %
Ermis Aradippou	9 March 2021	13 April 2021	4	1	1	2	25.00
Novi Pazar	23 August 2023	31 December 2023	18	10	1	7	55.56
Železničar Pančevo	26 March 2024	Present	4	1	1	2	25.00
Total			26	12	3	11	46.15

== Honours ==
Apollon

- Cypriot Cup: 2001

Omonia

- Cypriot Cup: 2005
- Cyprus FA Shield: 2005

Anorthosis

- Cypriot Championship: 2008
