= Efstathios Aloneftis =

Cypriot international footballer

Stathis Aloneftis
Personal information
- Full name: Efstathios Aloneftis
- Date of birth: 29 March 1983 (age 43)
- Place of birth: Nicosia, Cyprus
- Height: 1.66 m (5 ft 5 in)
- Position: Left winger

Senior career*
| Years | Team | Apps | (Gls) |
| 2002–2005 | Omonia | 71 | (18) |
| 2005–2007 | AEL | 54 | (8) |
| 2007–2008 | Energie Cottbus | 12 | (0) |
| 2008–2012 | Omonia | 97 | (23) |
| 2012–2020 | APOEL | 121 | (19) |

International career^{‡}
| 2005–2017 | Cyprus | 55 | (10) |
- * Club domestic league appearances and goals as of 18 January 2018 ‡ National team caps and goals as of 21 April 2018

Stathis Aloneftis ( Στάθης Αλωνεύτης born 29 March 1983) is a Cypriot international footballer. He is a winger who tends to play on the left wing, highly regarded for his speed and technique.

== Club career ==
=== Omonia Nicosia ===
Born in Nicosia, Cyprus, Aloneftis began his professional career playing for Omonia, making his first appearance for the senior squad during the 2000–01 season however his real talent became apparent during 2003–04. His successes with Omonia include one championship (2003), one super cup (2001) and one cup in 2005.

=== Larissa ===
He then moved to the Greek club AEL on 22 June 2005, for a transfer fee of CYP £136,000. The 2006–07 season was good for Aloneftis and in January 2007 he went on trial to Queens Park Rangers, but no move was materialised. At the end of the same season he played with his team in the Cup final, where he was in the starting lineup and his team beat 2–1 Panathinaikos and won the Cup.

=== Energie Cottbus ===
On 31 May 2007, German side Energie Cottbus announced the signing of Aloneftis on free transfer under the Bosman ruling, making him the first Cypriot to compete in the Bundesliga.

=== Return to Omonia ===
On 28 June 2008, he returned to Omonia and signed a five-year contract. He helped the club to win one championship (2010), two cups (2011, 2012) and one super cup (2010). He mutually terminated his contract with the club on 1 June 2012.

=== APOEL ===
On 8 June 2012, Aloneftis signed a three-year contract with APOEL. At the end of the season, he became a champion after helping APOEL to win the 2012–13 Cypriot First Division. During the 2013–14 season, he appeared in five 2013–14 UEFA Europa League group stage matches for APOEL and managed to win all the titles in Cyprus, the Cypriot League, the Cypriot Cup and the Cypriot Super Cup.

On 26 August 2014, Aloneftis came on as a 61st-minute substitute and three minutes later he scored the third goal in APOEL's 4–0 triumph over Aalborg BK for the UEFA Champions League play-off round, helping his team reach to the group stage of the UEFA Champions League. Aloneftis appeared in five group stage matches in APOEL's 2014–15 UEFA Champions League campaign. In the 2014–15 season, he managed to add two more titles to his collection, as APOEL won again both the Cypriot championship and the cup.

On 2 March 2017, Aloneftis signed a one-year contract extension with APOEL, running until 31 May 2018.

== International career ==
Aloneftis is a regular pick for the Cyprus national football team. He is capped 60 times and scored 10 goals. He made his national team debut on 30 March 2005 against Switzerland in a 2006 FIFA World Cup qualification match. He scored his first goal on 7 September 2005 against Switzerland in a 2006 FIFA World Cup qualification.

=== International goals ===
Scores and results list Cyprus' goal tally first.

| # | Date | Venue | Opponent | Score | Result | Competition |
|---|---|---|---|---|---|---|
| 1 | 7 September 2005 | GSP Stadium, Nicosia | Switzerland | 1–1 | 1–3 | 2006 FIFA World Cup qualification |
| 2 | 24 March 2007 | GSP Stadium, Nicosia | Slovakia | 1–0 | 1–3 | UEFA Euro 2008 qualification |
| 3 | 12 September 2007 | GSP Stadium, Nicosia | San Marino | 2–0 | 3–0 | UEFA Euro 2008 qualification |
| 4 | 12 September 2007 | GSP Stadium, Nicosia | San Marino | 3–0 | 3–0 | UEFA Euro 2008 qualification |
| 5 | 6 February 2008 | GSP Stadium, Nicosia | Ukraine | 1–0 | 1–1 | Friendly |
| 6 | 6 September 2008 | Antonis Papadopoulos Stadium, Larnaca | Italy | 1–1 | 1–2 | 2010 FIFA World Cup qualification |
| 7 | 10 October 2009 | Antonis Papadopoulos Stadium, Larnaca | Bulgaria | 4–1 | 4–1 | 2010 FIFA World Cup qualification |
| 8 | 3 September 2010 | Estádio D. Afonso Henriques, Guimarães | Portugal | 1–0 | 4–4 | UEFA Euro 2012 qualification |
| 9 | 12 October 2012 | Ljudski vrt, Maribor | Slovenia | 1–2 | 1–2 | 2014 FIFA World Cup qualification |
| 10 | 16 October 2012 | Antonis Papadopoulos Stadium, Larnaca | Norway | 1–1 | 1–3 | 2014 FIFA World Cup qualification |

== Honours ==
Omonia

- Cypriot First Division: 2002–03, 2009–10
- Cypriot Cup: 2004–05, 2010–11, 2011–12
- Cypriot Super Cup: 2003, 2010

AEL

- Greek Cup: 2006–07

APOEL

- Cypriot First Division: 2012–13, 2013–14, 2014–15, 2015–16, 2016–17, 2017–18, 2018–19
- Cypriot Cup: 2013–14, 2014–15
- Cypriot Super Cup: 2013
