= Nikos Nicolaou (footballer, born 1973) =

Cypriot footballer (born 1973)

Personal information
- Date of birth: 5 August 1973 (age 53)
- Place of birth: Limassol, Cyprus
- Height: 1.83 m (6 ft 0 in)
- Positions: Midfielder; defender

Youth career
- Apollon Limassol

Senior career*
Years	Team	Apps	(Gls)
1992–2001	Nea Salamis Famagusta	142	(18)
2001–2009	Anorthosis Famagusta	176	(40)
Total		318	(58)

International career
1999–2005	Cyprus	30	(1)

Managerial career
- 2010: Anorthosis Famagusta (caretaker)
- * Club domestic league appearances and goals

Nikos Nicolaou (born 5 August 1973) is a Cypriot former professional footballer who played as a midfielder or defender. He spent the majority of his senior career with Nea Salamis and Anorthosis Famagusta, serving as captain for the latter during their historic 2008–09 UEFA Champions League campaign.

== Club career ==
Nicolaou began his career in the youth ranks of Apollon Limassol before making his senior debut with Nea Salamis Famagusta in 1992. He spent nine seasons at Nea Salamis, featuring in over 140 league matches.

In 2001, Nicolaou transferred to Anorthosis Famagusta. He eventually became club captain and played a vital role in the team's successes throughout the decade, winning two Cypriot First Division titles and two Cypriot Cups.

During the 2008–09 UEFA Champions League, Nicolaou captained Anorthosis as they became the first Cypriot club to qualify for the group stage of the competition. On 26 November 2008, he scored a goal in a 2–2 home draw against Werder Bremen in Group B.

He retired from professional football at the conclusion of the 2008–09 season.

== International career ==
Nicolaou made his senior international debut for Cyprus in 1999. Between 1999 and 2005, he earned 27 caps and scored one goal for his country.

== Coaching career ==
Following his retirement as a player, Nicolaou remained at Anorthosis Famagusta as part of the technical staff. In early 2010, he briefly served as the team's caretaker manager.

== Career statistics ==
=== Club ===
Appearances and goals by club, season and competition
Club	Season	League			National cup		Continental		Total	
Club	Season	Division	Apps	Goals	Apps	Goals	Apps	Goals	Apps	Goals
Nea Salamis	1992–93	Cypriot First Division	12	1			–		12	1
Nea Salamis	1993–94	Cypriot First Division	18	2			–		18	2
Nea Salamis	1994–95	Cypriot First Division	15	0			–		15	0
Nea Salamis	1995–96	Cypriot First Division	20	3			–		20	3
Nea Salamis	1996–97	Cypriot First Division	16	2			–		16	2
Nea Salamis	1997–98	Cypriot First Division	14	1			–		14	1
Nea Salamis	1998–99	Cypriot First Division	17	3			–		17	3
Nea Salamis	1999–00	Cypriot First Division	16	4			–		16	4
Nea Salamis	2000–01	Cypriot First Division	14	2			–		14	2
Nea Salamis	Total		142	18			0	0	142	18
Anorthosis Famagusta	2001–02	Cypriot First Division	22	5			–		22	5
Anorthosis Famagusta	2002–03	Cypriot First Division	24	6			4	0	28	6
Anorthosis Famagusta	2003–04	Cypriot First Division	21	4			2	0	23	4
Anorthosis Famagusta	2004–05	Cypriot First Division	23	5			–		23	5
Anorthosis Famagusta	2005–06	Cypriot First Division	22	6			6	1	28	7
Anorthosis Famagusta	2006–07	Cypriot First Division	20	4			–		20	4
Anorthosis Famagusta	2007–08	Cypriot First Division	24	7			6	0	30	7
Anorthosis Famagusta	2008–09	Cypriot First Division	20	3			10	1	30	4
Anorthosis Famagusta	Total		176	40			28	2	204	42
Career total			318	58			28	2	346	60

=== International ===
Appearances and goals by national team and year
National team	Year	Apps	Goals
Cyprus	1999	1	0
Cyprus	2000	5	0
Cyprus	2001	2	0
Cyprus	2002	6	1
Cyprus	2003	7	0
Cyprus	2004	5	0
Cyprus	2005	4	0
Total		30	1

Scores and results list Cyprus's goal tally first, score column indicates score after each Nicolaou goal.

List of international goals scored by Nikos Nicolaou
No.	Date	Venue	Opponent	Score	Result	Competition
1	15 May 2002	Diagoras Stadium, Rhodes, Greece	Greece	1–0	1–3	Friendly

== Honours ==
Anorthosis Famagusta

- Cypriot First Division: 2004–05, 2007–08
- Cypriot Cup: 2001–02, 2006–07
- Cypriot Super Cup: 2007
