= Giorgos Panagi =

Cypriot footballer (born 1986)

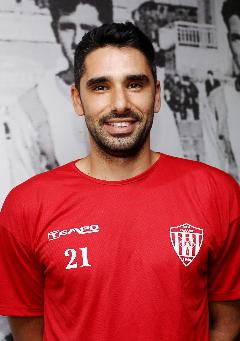

Personal information
- Full name: Giorgos Panagi
- Date of birth: 3 November 1986 (age 39)
- Place of birth: Larnaca, Cyprus
- Height: 1.82 m (6 ft 0 in)
- Position: Midfielder

Youth career
- Nea Salamina

Senior career*
Years	Team	Apps	(Gls)
2002–2007	Nea Salamina	37	(2)
2007–2009	Anorthosis	37	(1)
2009–2011	AC Omonia	15	(0)
2011–2012	Alki Larnaca	0	(0)
2012	→ Anagennisi Dherynia (loan)	11	(1)
2013	Ermis Aradippou	25	(0)
2013–2014	Nea Salamina	21	(0)
2014–2015	Omonia Aradippou	14	(1)

International career
2007–2011	Cyprus	14	(0)
- * Club domestic league appearances and goals

Giorgos Panagi (Greek: Γιώργος Παναγή; born November 3, 1986, in Larnaca) is a retired Cypriot footballer.

He is best known for scoring a goal in Anorthosis' famous draw with Internazionale becoming the first Cypriot player to score for a Cypriot side in a Champions League group stage match.

== Honours ==
Anorthosis Famagusta

- Cypriot First Division: 2007-08

Omonia

- Cypriot Championship: 2010
- Cypriot Cup: 2011
- Cyprus FA Shield: 2010
