= Klimenti Tsitaishvili =

Georgian footballer

Klimenti Tsitaishvili კლიმენტი წიტაიშვილი
Personal information
- Date of birth: 5 January 1979 (age 47)
- Place of birth: Tbilisi, Georgia
- Height: 1.80 m (5 ft 11 in)
- Position: Striker

Senior career*
Years	Team	Apps	(Gls)
1993–1995	Dinamo Zugdidi	22	(0)
1995–1996	Shevardeni-1906 Tbilisi	12	(2)
1996–1997	Odishi Zugdidi	39	(10)
1998	Dinamo Tbilisi	9	(0)
1998	TSU Tbilisi	14	(4)
1999–2000	Dinamo Tbilisi	32	(12)
2000–2001	Hapoel Ironi Rishon LeZion	31	(12)
2001	Bnei Yehuda Tel Aviv	15	(3)
2002	Hapoel Tzafririm Holon	0	(0)
2002–2003	Kolkheti-1913 Poti	6	(0)
2003–2006	Anorthosis Famagusta	57	(21)
2006	AEL Limassol	13	(2)
2007	AEK Larnaca	12	(2)
2008–2009	Anorthosis Famagusta	26	(4)
2009–2010	Nea Salamis	22	(5)
2014	Zugdidi	10	(1)

International career
1997–2001	Georgia U21	16	(5)
- * Club domestic league appearances and goals

Klimenti Tsitaishvili (Georgian: კლიმენტი წიტაიშვილი; born 5 January 1979) is a retired football striker from Georgia.

He played for the main squad of FC Chernomorets Novorossiysk in the Russian Premier League Cup.

== Personal life ==
His son Giorgi Tsitaishvili is also a professional player.
