= Nikolaos Frousos =

Greek footballer

Personal information
- Full name: Nikolaos Frousos
- Date of birth: 29 April 1974 (age 52)
- Place of birth: Filiatra, Greece
- Height: 1.82 m (6 ft 0 in)
- Position: Striker

Senior career*
Years	Team	Apps	(Gls)
1992–1999	Ionikos	165	(54)
1999–2003	PAOK	76	(26)
2003–2004	Ionikos	27	(5)
2004–2010	Anorthosis	112	(50)

International career
1999–2001	Greece	7	(0)

Managerial career
- 2009–2010: Anorthosis (Coach)
- 2011–2012: Anorthosis (Scouter)
- 2012: Ionikos
- 2013–: Nikos & Sokratis Erimis
- * Club domestic league appearances and goals as of 13 July 2012

Nikolaos Frousos (Greek: Νικόλαος Φρούσος; born 29 April 1974) is a former Greek footballer who played for Cyprus Anorthosis Famagusta.

== Career ==
Frousos' career began when he signed a professional contract with Ionikos, making his first first-team appearance in 1992 at the age of 18, transferred from Erani Filiatra. He stayed there for eight years where he scored 59 goals. In the summer of 2000 he moved to PAOK FC for three years, scoring 16 goals. The following year he moved back to Ionikos for a single season. In June 2004, he signed with the Cypriot giants Anorthosis Famagusta. During the four years he played for Anorthosis, he won two championships (2004–2005 & 2007–2008), and one cup (2006–2007). He is married and has 2 children, one girl, Katerina, and one boy, Apostolos.

== Honours ==
Ionikos

- Beta Ethniki: 1993–94

PAOK

- Greek Football Cup: 2002–03

Anorthosis

- Cypriot First Division: 2004–05, 2007–08
- Cypriot Cup: 2006–07
- Cypriot Super Cup: 2007
