= Łukasz Sosin =

Polish footballer (born 1977)

Personal information
- Full name: Łukasz Sosin
- Date of birth: 7 May 1977 (age 49)
- Place of birth: Kraków, Poland
- Height: 1.90 m (6 ft 3 in)
- Position: Striker

Youth career
- 1985–1994: Hutnik Kraków

Senior career*
Years	Team	Apps	(Gls)
1994–1999	Hutnik Kraków	31	(17)
1996	→ Kalwarianka K. Z. (loan)		
1996–1997	→ Cracovia (loan)		
1999–2002	Wisła Kraków	17	(5)
1999–2000	→ Odra Wodzisław (loan)	27	(10)
2001–2002	→ Odra Wodzisław (loan)	23	(12)
2002–2007	Apollon Limassol	121	(96)
2007–2009	Anorthosis Famagusta	67	(26)
2010	Kavala	11	(0)
2010–2012	Aris Limassol	56	(25)

International career
2006–2009	Poland	4	(2)

Managerial career
- 2024–2025: Poland U18
- 2025–2026: Poland U19
- * Club domestic league appearances and goals

Łukasz Sosin (born 7 May 1977) is a Polish professional football manager and former player who played as a striker. Besides Poland, he has played in Cyprus. He was most recently in charge of the Poland national under-19 team.

== Club career ==
Sosin was born in Kraków, Poland.

In the beginning of his career, he started out as a sweeper and later became a striker. In Poland, Sosin played for Hutnik Kraków, Kalwarianka Kalwaria Zebrzydowska, Cracovia, Wisła Kraków and Odra Wodzisław. Sosin came to Cyprus in 2002 and joined Apollon Limassol from Wisła Kraków. In 2007, he moved from Apollon Limassol to Anorthosis Famagusta.

Sosin was the top goalscorer of the Cypriot First Division for three consecutive seasons (2003–04 to 2005–06) while playing for Apollon Limassol. During the 2007–08 campaign, he was joint top scorer (the other being David da Costa of Doxa Katokopia. He won the Cypriot Championship twice; with Apollon Limassol in the 2005–06 season, and the 2007–08 title with Anorthosis. He also won the Cypriot Super Cup in 2006 with Apollon. On 3 January 2010, Greek side Kavala announced the signing of Sosin. The next season, he moved to Aris Limassol on a two-year contract.

== International career ==
Sosin earned four caps with the Poland national team, scoring two goals in his debut in a friendly against Saudi Arabia in March 2006. Sosin did not regularly get called up for Poland after falling out with Dutch coach Leo Beenhakker.

His last game was against San Marino in April 2009, where he struck the post, and provided an assist on Marek Saganowski's goal.

== Post-playing career ==
In September 2017, Sosin joined Pafos's academy in Cyprus as their technical director, a role he held until the end of 2019. He then became a youth coach for Hutnik Kraków in 2020. From 2022 to 2023, Sosin was part of the management staff of the Poland under-19s, working as an assistant under Marcin Brosz.

On 7 June 2024, Sosin was appointed head coach of the Poland under-18 team. In August 2025, he moved up to take charge of the Poland under-19s. He left the national team on 23 June 2026.

== Career statistics ==
=== International ===
Appearances and goals by national team and year
National team	Year	Apps	Goals
Poland
Poland	2006	3	2
Poland	2009	1	0
Total		4	2

Scores and results list Poland's goal tally first, score column indicates score after each Sosin goal.

List of international goals scored by Łukasz Sosin
No.	Date	Venue	Cap	Opponent	Score	Result	Competition
1	28 March 2006	Riyadh, Saudi Arabia	1	Saudi Arabia	1–0	2–1	Friendly
2	28 March 2006	Riyadh, Saudi Arabia	1	Saudi Arabia	2–1	2–1	Friendly

== Managerial statistics ==
As of match played 31 March 2026

Managerial record by team and tenure
Team	From	To	Record							
Team	From	To	G	W	D	L	GF	GA	GD	Win %
Poland U18	7 June 2024	11 August 2025	10	7	1	2	23	11	+12	70.00
Poland U19	11 August 2025	23 June 2026	12	6	1	5	18	7	+11	50.00
Total			22	13	2	7	41	18	+23	59.09

== Honours ==
Wisła Kraków

- Ekstraklasa: 2000–01
- Polish League Cup: 2000–01

Apollon Limassol

- Cypriot First Division: 2005–06
- Cypriot Super Cup: 2006

Anorthosis

- Cypriot First Division: 2007–08

Individual

- Cypriot First Division top scorer: 2003–04, 2004–05, 2005–06, 2007–08
