= Giannis Skopelitis =

Greek footballer

Personal information
- Full name: Ioannis Skopelitis
- Date of birth: 2 March 1978 (age 48)
- Place of birth: Athens, Greece
- Height: 1.80 m (5 ft 11 in)
- Position: Midfielder

Senior career*
Years	Team	Apps	(Gls)
1996–1997	Apollon Kalamarias	0	(0)
1997–2005	Egaleo	181	(7)
2005–2006	Portsmouth	18	(0)
2006–2007	Egaleo	41	(2)
2007	Anorthosis	15	(1)
2008	Atromitos	12	(0)
2008–2011	Anorthosis	54	(1)
2011–2012	AEK Larnaca	28	(3)
2012–2013	Anorthosis	29	(0)
2013–2015	AEK Larnaca	49	(2)
2015–2017	Nea Salamina	62	(1)
2017–2018	Egaleo	0	(0)
- * Club domestic league appearances and goals as of 16:46, 22 June 2017 (UTC)

Giannis Skopelitis (Greek: Γιάννης Σκοπελίτης; born 2 March 1978) is a Greek former professional footballer who played as a midfielder.

== Career ==
=== Portsmouth ===
Skopelitis joined FA Premier League club Portsmouth on 28 January 2005 from Egaleo for a fee of £1 million, as a replacement for Amady Faye, who had been sold to Newcastle United. However, it later transpired that the transfer deal was structured as a year's loan with an initial fee of around £300,000 with the remaining £700,000 being paid if the club desired to keep the player after this period.

Skopelitis made his debut for Pompey as a 73rd-minute substitute for Ricardo Fuller in a 2-1 home win over Middlesbrough. Coincidentally, he had already faced Middlesbrough in 2004-05 when facing them for Egaleo in the UEFA Cup.

Having reached the end of his trial period for Portsmouth at the turn of the new year 2006, Skopelitis had made only a few substitute appearances, failing to impress, and returned to Egaleo.

=== Greece and Cyprus ===
Skopelitis has played for Egaleo and Atromitos in the Super League Greece.

Skopelitis joined Anorthosis Famagusta FC in the 2007-08 season. He left the Cypriot club due to personal problems and transferred for a year to Atromitos. In the 2008-09 season Skopelitis transferred back to Anorthosis, and in the same year played with them in the UEFA Champions League group stage, and was made captain.

On 3 July 2013, Skopelitis and Anorthosis decided (for the 3rd time) for a mutual contract termination. On 6 July, Skopelitis returned to Larnaca, signing a one-year contract.
