= 2012–13 Anorthosis Famagusta FC season =

Anorthosis Famagusta
2012–13 season
- Chairman: (Cyprus) Savvas Kakos
- Manager: (Cyprus) Pambos Christodoulou (Cyprus) Andreas Mavris
- Stadium: Antonis Papadopoulos Stadium
- Cypriot First Division: 2nd
- Cypriot Cup: Quarter-finals
- Europa League: Third qualifying round
- Top goalscorer: League: Juliano Spadacio (14 goals); All: Juliano Spadacio (15 goals)
- Highest home attendance: 9,000 (9 August 2012)
- Lowest home attendance: 600 (18 May 2013)
Home colours	Away colours

The 2012–13 season was Anorthosis' 64th consecutive season in the Cypriot First Division, the top division of Cyprus football. It covers a period from 1 July 2011 to 30 May 2012.

Anorthosis Famagusta began the season in Second qualifying round of Europa League. Anorthosis faced the cup winner of Estonian for the season 2011–12, Levadia Tallinn, On the first match Anorthosis Famagusta defeat the Estonian club 3-1 (Spadacio, Toni Calvo, Ricardo Laborde) in Kadrioru Stadium, with MVP the best player of the club Ricardo Laborde. On 26 July in Antonis Papadopoulos Stadium Anorthosis defeat Levadia Tallinn with score 3–0 with scorers (Okkas, Toni Calvo, Ricardo Laborde), with MVP the attacking midfielder of the team Juliano Spadacio. On 28 August, Anorthosis defeat Georgian Dila Gori away with score 0–1, With scorer Giannis Okkas at 69th minute. Dila Gori played with 10 players after the ban of Gogita Gogua with red card from the referee. On 9 August after a bad match anorthosis end their European dream at 3rd QR. of uefa europa league. Anorthosis lost 3–0 at his home from Dila Gori.

== Season overview ==
=== Pre-season ===
Anorthosis Famagusta commenced their summer transfer activity on 19 March, signing Cypriot Goalkeeper Christos Mastrou for 3 seasons from Anagennisi Dherynia on a free transfer. On 7 May, Anorthosis has renewed its collaboration with Ricardo Laborde up in 2017 by buying rights from Atlético Huila. This transcription cost 300,000 dollars. On 12 May Anorthosis Famagusta at the end of the football season 2011–12 announced the termination of contracts and failure to renew its cooperation with the players association Matúš Kozáčik, Adam Stachowiak, Janício Martins, Stanislav Angelov, Michalis Konstantinou, and Jaouad Zairi. Additionally, Dato Kvirkvelia has also been added to those departing from the team. The player expressed the wish to leave the team for personal reasons. The best centre back of Champions League 2012 Paulo Jorge was signed for 2 seasons on a free transfer from Apoel Nicosia on 13 May. On 13 May, Anorthosis has renewed its collaboration with Jan Rezek up in 2015 by buying rights from Viktoria Plzeň. This transcription cost 220,000 Euros. On 26 May, Anorthosis Demetris Economou was signed for 5 seasons on a transfer from Enosis Neon Paralimni. This transcription cost 100,000 Euros. On 28 May, Anorthosis Announce the terminations of the contract with Igor Tomašić by paying compensation to the player €90,000. On 29 May, Anorthosis Announce the contract with the national player with Montenegro team Srđan Blažić for the next two years. On 30 May, Anorthosis Announce the contract with the 25 years old Toni Calvo until 2014. On 4 June was Anorthosis first unofficial training into Andonis Papadopoulos stadium. Anothosis began the training with the part of the current squad, Marco Andic, Paulo Jorge, Jurgen Colin, Christos Marangos, Vincent Laban, Valentinos Sielis, Christos Mastrou, Gabriel Constantinou, Demetris Economou, Zacharias Theodorou, Adamos Andreou, Constantinos Laifis, Civard Sprockel, Savvas Panayiotou and Panayiotis Loizides. On 6 June, Anorthosis Announce the contract with the 32 years old William Boaventura. On 9 June, Anorthosis Announce the contract with Giorgos Sielis the brother of the international player of Anorthosis Famagusta Valentinos Sielis. On 16 June, Anorthosis Announce the contract with the Brazilian Midfielder Juliano Spadacio for 1+1 years contract. On 21 June, Anorthosis announced a two-year contract with the National Slovenian Right back Branko Ilič. On 27 June, Anorthosis Announce the contract for 1+1 years with the national Romania Midfielder, Dan Alexa. Victorious team began the cycle of friendly games in preparation in Austria. The team with two goals from Spadacio and one of Roncatto and Laborde, won the FC Wacker Innsbruck II with 4–0. Tie ended 1–1 in the second friendly of the team in preparation of Austria, against Dinamo București. Not completed the third friendly of the team, with Dynamo Kyiv, and the pitch was unsuitable due to heavy rain and 55 was stopped finally and while the team was ahead in the score to 3–1. The team's fourth friendly match in Austria was completed with a draw, without goals, against Petrolul Ploiesti. The game's greatest lost chance was on 55', when in a penalty won by the team Giannis Okkas aimed the goal post. On 12 July, Anorthosis won Doxa katokopias for the last friendly match before European competitions with 2–1.

== Club ==
=== Coaching staff ===
Position	Staff
Head coach	(Israel) Ronny Levy
Assistant coach	(Cyprus) Simos Tarapoulouzi
Fitness trainer	(Cyprus) Giorgos Georgiou
Goalkeepers coach	(Albania) Arjan Beqaj

Source: anorthosis.com

=== Club hierarchy ===
Position	Staff
President	Savvas Kakos
Deputy President	Christos Geranis
1st Vice-president	Marios Leukaritis
2nd Vice-president	Michalis Ppekris
3rd Vice-president	Charis Theocharous
Executive Director	Fragkeskos Hadjimichael
Financial Director	Christos Theodoulou

Source: anorthosis.com

== Current squad ==
Last Update: 12 January 2013

No.	Pos.	Nat.	Name	MS	Notes
2	LB	(Serbia)	Marko Andic	17	
3	CB	(Portugal)	Paulo Jorge	12	
4	CB	(Netherlands)	Jurgen Colin	14	
5	DM	(Romania)	Dan Alexa	11	
7	RW	(Spain)	Toni Calvo	10	
8	AM	(Brazil)	Juliano Spadacio	18	
9	CF	(Cyprus)	Giannis Okkas	8	Captain
10	AM	(Israel)	Barak Yitzhaki	8	On Loan
11	CF	(Brazil)	Evandro Roncatto	2	
16	GK	(France)	Mathieu Valverde	12	
17	RW	(Czech Republic)	Jan Rezek	17	
18	DM	(Cyprus)	Giorgos Sielis	0	
19	DM	(Greece)	Giannis Skopelitis	16	3rd captain
20	AM	(Cyprus)	Vincent Laban	4	vice-captain
21	LW	(Colombia)	Ricardo Laborde	12	
24	RB	(Portugal)	Pedro Almeida	0	
23	DM	(Cyprus)	Valentinos Sielis	8	
27	CF	(Romania)	Emil Jula	1	On Loan
30	LM	(Cyprus)	Andreas Avraam		
31	GK	(Cyprus)	Christos Mastrou	6	
33	RB	(Slovenia)	Branko Ilič	15	
40	CB	(Cyprus)	Demetris Economou	0	
42	AM	(Cyprus)	Adamos Andreou	0	
43	RW	(Cyprus)	Constantinos Laifis	0	
44	CB	(Romania)	George Galamaz		
80	RB	(Romania)	Rui Duarte	0	
99	DM	(Israel)	Moshe Ohayon	4	

Last updated: 1 September 2012
Source: Squad statistics and Start formations
Only competitive matches.
Using the most used start formation.
Ordered by position on pitch (from back right to front left).

=== Reserve squad ===
No.	Pos.	Nat.	Name	MS	Notes
33	GK	(Albania)	Aldo Teqja		
35	CF	(Cyprus)	Constantinos Mintikkis		
36	CF	(Cyprus)	Marcos Michael		
41	CF	(Cyprus)	Panagiotis Loizides		
45	CM	(Cyprus)	Savvas Panayiotou		

=== Out on loan ===
No.	Pos.	Nat.	Name	MS	Notes
25	CM	(Cyprus)	Christos Soteriou		At Ahyronas Liopetriou
37	CB	(Cyprus)	Nicos Efthimiou		At Othellos Athienou
32	GK	(Cyprus)	Gavriel Constantinou		At Chalkanoras Idaliou
38	AM	(Cyprus)	Adamos Hadjigeorgiou		At Anagennisi Dherynia
44	AM	(Cyprus)	Zacharias Theodorou		At Ayia Napa
47	CB	(Cyprus)	Vasilis Tofias		At Asil Lysi
48	DM	(Cyprus)	Andreas Georgiou		At Asil Lysi
49	RW	(Cyprus)	Nikos Pieri		At Frenaros
50	SS	(Cyprus)	Christoforos Christofi		At Ethnolps Assia

==== Foreign players ====
EU Nationals

- (Portugal) (European Union) Paulo Jorge
- (Czech Republic) (European Union) Jan Rezek
- (Netherlands) (European Union) Jürgen Colin
- (Serbia) (European Union) Marko Andić
- (Slovenia) (European Union) Branko Ilič
- (Romania) (European Union) Dan Alexa
- (Romania) (European Union) Emil Jula
- (Romania) (European Union) Rui Duarte
- (Greece) (European Union) Giannis Skopelitis
- (France) (European Union) Mathieu Valverde
- (France) (Cyprus) (European Union) Vincent Laban
- (Spain) (Greece) (European Union) Toni Calvo

EU Nationals (Dual citizenship)

- (Israel) (France) Moshe Ohayon
- (Brazil) (Italy) Evandro Roncatto
- (Brazil) (Italy) Juliano Spadacio

Non-EU Nationals

- (Israel) Barak Yitzhaki
- (Colombia) Ricardo Laborde

=== Active Internationals ===
Cyprus

- (Cyprus) Valentinos Sielis
- (Cyprus) Christos Mastrou
- (Cyprus) Vincent Laban
- (Cyprus) (U21) Demetris Economou
- (Cyprus) (U21) Adamos Andreou
- (Cyprus) (U21) Constantinos Laifis||

Europe

- (Albania) (U17) Aldo Teqja
- (Portugal) (U19) Pedro Almeida
- (Czech Republic) Jan Rezek
- (Slovenia) Branko Ilič
- (Israel) Moshe Ohayon
- (Israel) Barak Yitzhaki

== Transfers ==
=== In ===
No.	Pos.	Nat.	Name	Age	EU	Moving from	Type	Transfer window	Ends	Transfer fee	Source
1	GK	(Montenegro)	Srđan Blažić	29	EU	Panetolikos (Greece)	Transfer	Summer	2013	Free	Anorthosis.com
3	CB	(Portugal)	Paulo Jorge	31	EU	APOEL	Transfer	Summer	2014	Free	Anorthosis.com
5	RB	(Romania)	Dan Alexa	32	EU	Rapid București (Romania)	Transfer	Summer	2013	Free	Anorthosis.com
6	DM	(Cyprus)	Christos Marangos	29	EU	Anorthosis Famagusta	Contract Renew	Summer	2013	Free	Anorthosis.com
7	RW	(Spain)	Toni Calvo	25	EU	Levski Sofia (Bulgaria)	Transfer	Summer	2014	Free	Anorthosis.com
8	AM	(Brazil)	Juliano Spadacio	31	EU	Astra Ploiești (Romania)	Transfer	Summer	2013	Free	Anorthosis.com
9	CF	(Cyprus)	Ioannis Okkas	35	EU	Anorthosis Famagusta	Contract Renew	Summer	2013	Free	Anorthosis.com
10	AM	(Israel)	Barak Yitzhaki	27	EU	Maccabi Tel Aviv (Israel)	Loan	Summer	2013	Free	Anorthosis.com
12	RB	(Slovenia)	Branko Ilič	29	EU	Lokomotiv Moscow (Russia)	Transfer	Summer	2014	Free	Anorthosis.com
16	GK	(France)	Mathieu Valverde	28	EU	Lyon (France)	Transfer	Summer	2014	Free	Anorthosis.com
17	RW	(Czech Republic)	Jan Rezek	30	EU	Viktoria Plzeň (Czech Republic)	clause for loan	Summer	2015	€220.000	Anorthosis.com
18	DM	(Cyprus)	Giorgos Sielis	25	EU	AEP Paphos	Transfer	Summer	2013	Free	Anorthosis.com
21	LW	(Colombia)	Ricardo Laborde	24	Non-EU	Huila (Colombia)	clause for loan	Summer	2017	€230.180	Anorthosis.com
22	RB	(Portugal)	Pedro Almeida	33	EU	União de Leiria (Portugal)	Transfer	Summer	2015	Free	Anorthosis.com
24	DM	(Greece)	Giannis Skopelitis	33	EU	AEK Larnaca	Transfer	Summer	2015	Free	Anorthosis.com
27	CF	(Romania)	Emil Jula	32	EU	MSV Duisburg (Germany)	Loan	Summer	2013	Free	Anorthosis.com
31	GK	(Cyprus)	Christos Mastrou	24	EU	Anagennisi Dherynia	Transfer	Summer	2015	Free	Anorthosis.com
40	CB	(Cyprus)	Demetris Economou	19	EU	Enosis Neon Paralimni	Transfer	Summer	2017	€100.000	Anorthosis.com
42	AM	(Cyprus)	Adamos Andreou	17	EU	Anorthosis Famagusta	Youth system	Summer	2014	Free	Anorthosis.com
45	CF	(Cyprus)	Panagiotis Loizides	17	EU	Anorthosis Famagusta	Youth system	Summer	2013	Free	Anorthosis.com
46	CM	(Cyprus)	Savvas Panayiotou	17	EU	Anorthosis Famagusta	Youth system	Summer	2013	Free	Anorthosis.com
88	LB	(Brazil)	William Boaventura	32	Non-EU	APOEL	Transfer	Summer	2014	Free	Anorthosis.com
99	DM	(Israel)	Moshe Ohayon	29	EU	Luzern (Switzerland)	Transfer	Summer	2014	Free	Anorthosis.com
80	RB	(Romania)	Rui Duarte	29	EU	Rapid București (Romania)	Transfer	Winter	2014	Free	Anorthosis.com

Total expenditure: ▼€550.180

=== Out ===
No.	Pos.	Nat.	Name	Age	EU	Moving to	Type	Transfer window	Transfer fee	Source
1	GK	(Slovakia)	Matúš Kozáčik	28	EU	Viktoria Plzeň (Czech Republic)	Εnd of Contract	Summer	Free	Anorthosis.com
3	CB	(Croatia)	Igor Tomasic	35	EU	Free agent	Εnd of Contract	Summer	Free	Anorthosis.com
4	DM	(Bulgaria)	Stanislav Angelov	34	EU	Levski Sofia (Bulgaria)	Εnd of Contract	Summer	Free	Anorthosis.com
6	DM	(Cyprus)	Christos Marangos	29	EU	AEK Larnaca (Cyprus)	Transfer	Summer	Free	Anorthosis.com
7	LB	(Georgia (country))	David Kvirkvelia	31	EU	Dila Gori (Georgia (country))	Εnd of Contract	Summer	Free	Anorthosis.com
8	LW	(Morocco)	Jaouad Zairi	30	EU	Free agent	Εnd of Contract	Summer	Free	Anorthosis.com
19	CF	(Cyprus)	Michalis Constantinou	34	EU	AEL Limassol (Cyprus)	Εnd of Contract	Summer	Free	Anorthosis.com
22	RB	(Cape Verde)	Janicio Martins	32	EU	Free agent	Εnd of Contract	Summer	Free	Anorthosis.com
28	AM	(Brazil)	Marquinhos	30	EU	Changchun Yatai (China)	Εnd of Contract	Summer	€250.000	Anorthosis.com
31	GK	(Poland)	Adam Stachowiak	25	EU	Górnik Zabrze (Poland)	Εnd of Loan	Summer	Free	Anorthosis.com
54	DM	(Greece)	Giorgos Makris	27	EU	Atromitos (Greece)	Εnd of Loan	Summer	Free	
83	CB	(Netherlands Antilles)	Civard Sprockel	28	EU	CSKA Sofia (Bulgaria)	Transfer	Summer	Free	Anorthosis.com
1	GK	(Montenegro)	Srđan Blažić	29	EU	Nea Salamis Famagusta (Cyprus)	Loan	Summer	Free	Anorthosis.com

Total income: ▲€250.000

== Friendly matches ==
Win Draw Loss Postponed

29 June 2012 Friendly	FC Wacker Innsbruck II (Austria)	0–4	(Cyprus) Anorthosis Famagusta	Seefeld, Bavaria, Austria
18:00		Report	9' Juliano Spadacio; 52' Evandro Roncatto; 64' Juliano Spadacio; 69' Ricardo Laborde	Stadium: Seefeld training stadium Man of the Match: Toni Calvo

1 July 2012 Friendly	Dinamo București (Romania)	1–1	(Cyprus) Anorthosis Famagusta	Seefeld, Bavaria, Austria
18:00	Marius Alexe 15'	Report	69' Ricardo Laborde	Stadium: Seefeld training stadium Man of the Match: Ricardo Laborde

3 July 2012 Friendly	Anorthosis Famagusta (Cyprus)	3–1	(Ukraine) Dynamo Kyiv	Seefeld, Bavaria, Austria
19:00	Paulo Jorge 29'; Ricardo Laborde 35'; Ricardo Laborde 48'	Report	27' Leandro Almeida; (yellow card) 31' Denys Harmash	Stadium: Stadium axams Man of the Match: Ricardo Laborde

6 July 2012 Friendly	Anorthosis Famagusta (Cyprus)	0–0	(Romania) Petrolul Ploiești	Seefeld, Bavaria, Austria
19:00		Report		Stadium: Stadium axams Man of the Match: Ricardo Laborde

12 July 2012 Friendly	Anorthosis Famagusta (Cyprus)	2–1	(Cyprus) Doxa Katokopias	Larnaka, Cyprus
19:00	Juliano Spadacio 14'; Giannis Okkas 60'	Report	63' Carlos Marques	Stadium: Antonis Papadopoulos; Man of the Match: Juliano Spadacio

12 August 2012 Friendly	Anorthosis Famagusta (Cyprus)	0–0	(Greece) Panathinaikos	Larnaka, Cyprus
20:00		Report		Stadium: Antonis Papadopoulos

24 August 2012 Friendly	Anagennisi Dherynia (Cyprus)	1–1	(Cyprus) Anorthosis Famagusta	Dherynia, Cyprus
18:00	Wesllem 44'	Report	31' Toni Calvo	Stadium: Anagennisi Football Ground

18 September 2012 Friendly	Anorthosis Famagusta (Cyprus)	8–0	(Cyprus) AEZ Zakakiou	Larnaka, Cyprus
18:00	Emil Jula 33'; Barak Yitzhaki 38'; Barak Yitzhaki 44'; Giannis Skopelitis 48'; Moshe Ohayon 52'; Emil Jula 69'; Panayiotis Loizides 76'; Giannis Skopelitis 81'	Report		Stadium: Antonis Papadopoulos; Man of the Match: Barak Yitzhaki

11 October 2012 Friendly	Alki Larnaca (Cyprus)	1–2	(Cyprus) Anorthosis Famagusta	Larnaka, Cyprus
16:00	Conde 17'	Report	80' Okkas; 90+4' (pen.) Juliano Spadacio	Stadium: Neo GSZ Stadium; Man of the Match: Barak Yitzhaki

=== Goal Scorers ===
R	Player	Pos	Goals
1	(Colombia) Ricardo Laborde	LW	4
1	(Brazil) Juliano Spadacio	AM	4
3	(Israel) Barak Yitzhaki	AM	2
3	(Greece) Giannis Skopelitis	DM	2
3	(Romania) Emil Jula	CF	2
3	(Cyprus) Giannis Okkas	CF	2
6	(Brazil) Evandro Roncatto	CF	1
6	(Portugal) Paulo Jorge	CB	1
6	(Cyprus) Panayiotis Loizides	LW	1
6	(Spain) Toni Calvo	RW	1
6	(Israel) Moshe Ohayon	DM	1

== UEFA Europa League ==
Win Draw Loss Postponed

19 July 2012 2nd QR.	Levadia Tallinn (Estonia)	1–3	(Cyprus) Anorthosis Famagusta	Tallinn, Estonia
18:45	Igor Morozov 82'	Report	45' Juliano Spadacio; 56' Ricardo Laborde; 62' Toni Calvo	Stadium: Kadrioru Stadium; Attendance: 2.550; Referee: Marco Fritz (Germany); Man of the Match: Ricardo Laborde

26 July 2012 2nd QR.	Anorthosis Famagusta (Cyprus)	3–0 (6–1 agg.)	(Estonia) Levadia Tallinn	Larnaka, Cyprus
20:00	Toni Calvo 13'; Giannis Okkas 41'; Ricardo Laborde 62'	Report		Stadium: Antonis Papadopoulos; Attendance: 8.050; Referee: Evgen Aranovsky (Ukraine); Man of the Match: Juliano Spadacio

2 August 2012 3rd QR.	Dila Gori (Georgia (country))	0–1	(Cyprus) Anorthosis Famagusta	Tbilisi, Georgia
19:00	Irakli Modebadze (yellow card) 24'; Giorgi Shashiashvili (yellow card) 26'; Gogita Gogua (yellow card) 29'; Giga Bechvaia (yellow card) 45+2'; Gogita Gogua (yellow card) 57' (yellow-red card); Vako Katsitadze (yellow card) 80'	Report	(yellow card) 15' Giannis Okkas; (yellow card) 45+4' Jürgen Colin; (yellow card) 69' Evandro Roncatto; (yellow card) 80' Dan Alexa; (yellow card) 86' Branko Ilič; 69' Giannis Okkas	Stadium: Mikheil Meskhi Stadium; Attendance: 6.000; Referee: Ken Henry Johnsen (Norway); Man of the Match: Giannis Okkas

9 August 2012 3rd QR.	Anorthosis Famagusta (Cyprus)	0–3 (1–3 agg.)	(Georgia (country)) Dila Gori	Larnaka, Cyprus
20:00	Dan Alexa (yellow card) 56'; Jurgen Colin (yellow card) 76'; Vincent Laban (red card) 79'	Report	(yellow card) 4' Giorgi Oniani; (yellow card) 15' Lasha Salukvadze; (yellow card) 25' Mate Vatsadze; (yellow card) 25+1' Lasha Gvalia; 54' Mate Vatsadze; (yellow card) 73' Giga Bechvaia; 78' Lasha Salukvadze; 80' Mate Vatsadze	Stadium: Antonis Papadopoulos; Attendance: 9.000; Referee: Ádám Radványi (Hungary); Man of the Match: Mate Vatsadze

=== Goal Scorers ===
R	Player	Pos	Goals
1	(Colombia) Ricardo Laborde	LW	2
1	(Spain) Toni Calvo	RW	2
1	(Cyprus) Giannis Okkas	CF	2
4	(Brazil) Juliano Spadacio	AM	1

== Cypriot First Division ==
Win Draw Loss Postponed

1 September 2012 Match day 1	Anorthosis Famagusta (Cyprus)	5–1	(Cyprus) AEP Paphos	Larnaka, Cyprus
19:00	Juliano Spadacio 25'; Giannis Okkas 45'; Toni Calvo 51'; Juliano Spadacio 57'; Jan Rezek 71'; Dan Alexa (yellow card) 73'; Giannis Skopelitis (yellow card) 79'	Report	(yellow card) 15' Gora Tall; (yellow card) 21' Petkakis; (yellow card) 40' Ioannis Savva; 90+1' Silas	Stadium: Antonis Papadopoulos; Attendance: 3.250; Referee: (Cyprus) Thomas Mouskos; Man of the Match: Toni Calvo

15 September 2012 Match day 2	Anorthosis Famagusta (Cyprus)	1–1	(Cyprus) Enosis	Larnaka, Cyprus
19:00	Vincent Laban (yellow card); William Boaventura 45+2'; William Boaventura (yellow card); Barak Yitzhaki (red card) 67'	Report	(yellow card) Demos Goumenos; (yellow card) Aldo Duscher; (yellow card) Andrew Hogg; 46' Leonardo; (yellow card) 59' (yellow-red card) Giorgos Kolanis; (yellow card) Leonardo; (yellow card) Costas Artymatas	Stadium: Antonis Papadopoulos; Attendance: 3.700; Referee: (Cyprus) Leondios Trattou

22 September 2012 Match day 3	Doxa Katokopias (Cyprus)	0–2	(Cyprus) Anorthosis Famagusta	Larnaka, Cyprus
20:00	Carlos Marques (yellow card) 43'; Toy (yellow card) 89'	Report	(yellow card) 20' Dan Alexa; (yellow card) 40' Marko Andić; 56' Juliano Spadacio; 48' Jan Rezek	Stadium: Ammochostos Stadium; Attendance: 2.100; Referee: (Cyprus) Demetriou Vasilis; Man of the Match: Jan Rezek

29 September 2012 Match day 4	Anorthosis Famagusta (Cyprus)	3–0	(Cyprus) Alki Larnaca	Larnaka, Cyprus
17:00	Juliano Spadacio 33'; Ricardo Laborde (yellow card); Toni Calvo (yellow card); Jan Rezek 58'; Dan Alexa (yellow card); Juliano Spadacio 76'; Valentinos Sielis (yellow card)	Report	(yellow card) Sérgio Filipe da Silva Barge; (red card) 40' Santamaria; (yellow card) Jonathan Aspas; (yellow card) Noel Kaseke; (yellow card) Emiliano Fusco	Stadium: Antonis Papadopoulos; Attendance: 3.000; Referee: (Cyprus) Giannis Anastasiou; Man of the Match: Juliano Spadacio

7 October 2012 Match day 5	Apollon Limassol (Cyprus)	0–2	(Cyprus) Anorthosis Famagusta	Limassol, Cyprus
18:00	Konstantinou (yellow card) 48'; Vasiliou (yellow card) 57'	Report	15' Ricardo Laborde; (yellow card) 28' Valentinos Sielis; (yellow card) 73' Branko Ilič; (yellow card) 76' Giannis Okkas; 90+3' Jan Rezek	Stadium: Tsirion Stadium; Attendance: 6.217; Referee: (Cyprus) Marios Nikolaou; Man of the Match: Ricardo Laborde

21 October 2012 Match day 6	Anorthosis Famagusta (Cyprus)	2–0	(Cyprus) Omonia Nicosia	Larnaka, Cyprus
17:00	Juliano Spadacio 5' (pen.); Ricardo Laborde (yellow card) 27'; Giannis Okkas (yellow card) 45'; Branko Ilič (red card) 70'; Jan Rezek 90+13'	Summary	(yellow card) 4' Yuval Spungin; (yellow card) 14' Bruno Aguiar; (yellow card) 43' Rasheed Alabi; (yellow card) 90' Marco Soares; (yellow card) 90+1' Nuno Assis	Stadium: Antonis Papadopoulos Stadium; Attendance: 8,500; Referee: (Cyprus) Leontios Trattou; Man of the Match: Juliano Spadacio

28 October 2012 Match day 7	Olympiakos Nicosia (Cyprus)	1–3	(Cyprus) Anorthosis Famagusta	Nicosia, Cyprus
18:00	Pedro Duarte (yellow card) 29'; Pieros Sotiriou 33'; Kyriacos Polykarpou (yellow card) 36'	Report	24' Ricardo Laborde; (yellow card) 33' Dan Alexa; 50' Jan Rezek; (yellow card) 69' Ricardo Laborde; 90+3' Evandro Roncatto	Stadium: GSP Stadium; Attendance: 2.189; Referee: (Cyprus) Christos Elia; Man of the Match: Ricardo Laborde

3 November 2012 Match day 8	Anorthosis Famagusta (Cyprus)	1–0	(Cyprus) Nea Salmis Famagusta	Larnaka, Cyprus
17:00	Juliano Spadacio 64' (pen.)	Summary		Stadium: Antonis Papadopoulos Stadium; Attendance: 4.500; Referee: (Cyprus) Marios Panayi

11 November 2012 Match day 9	Ayia Napa (Cyprus)	0–1	(Cyprus) Anorthosis Famagusta	Paralimni, Cyprus
16:00		Report	(yellow card) 67' Giannis Okkas; 84' Giannis Okkas	Stadium: Tasos Markou; Attendance: 1,540; Referee: (Cyprus) Sotiriou Loukas; Man of the Match: Giannis Okkas

19 November 2012 Match day 10	Anorthosis Famagusta (Cyprus)	5–1	(Cyprus) Ethnikos Achna	Larnaka, Cyprus
18:00	Giannis Okkas 34'; Jan Rezek 42'; Juliano Spadacio 42'; Ricardo Laborde (yellow card) 54'; Barak Yitzhaki 55'; Juliano Spadacio 78' (pen.)	Report	30' Elias Vattis; (yellow card) Nikos Arabatzis; (yellow card) Levan Maghradze	Stadium: Antonis Papadopoulos Stadium; Attendance: 4,500; Referee: (Cyprus) Demetris Masias; Man of the Match: Giannis Okkas

24 November 2012 Match day 11	AEK Larnaca (Cyprus)	2–3	(Cyprus) Anorthosis Famagusta	Larnaka, Cyprus
17:00	Nassir Maachi 42'; Antun Palić 42'; Christos Marangos (yellow card)	Report	12' Jan Rezek; 43' Branko Ilič; (yellow card) Jurgen Colin; (yellow card) Marko Andic; (yellow card) Dan Alexa; 66' Toni Calvo	Stadium: GSZ Stadium; Attendance: 8,500; Referee: (Cyprus) Demetris Chrisostomou; Man of the Match: Toni Calvo

1 December 2012 Match day 12	Anorthosis Famagusta (Cyprus)	1–1	(Cyprus) AEL Limassol	Larnaka, Cyprus
17:00	Jan Rezek 36'	Summary	Dédé 70'	Stadium: Antonis Papadopoulos Stadium; Attendance: 6,500; Referee: (Cyprus) Marios Tsangaris

8 December 2012 Match day 13	APOEL Nicosia (Cyprus)	0–1	(Cyprus) Anorthosis Famagusta	Nicosia, Cyprus
14:30	Hélio Pinto (yellow card); Nuno Morais (yellow card)	Report	9' Jan Rezek; (yellow card) Jan Rezek; (yellow card) Paulo Jorge; (yellow card) Jurgen Colin; (yellow card) Giannis Skopelitis	Stadium: GSP Stadium; Attendance: 15,780; Referee: (Cyprus) Ioannis Anastasiou; Man of the Match: Juliano Spadacio

15 December 2012 Match day 14	AEP Paphos (Cyprus)	0–2	(Cyprus) Anorthosis Famagusta	Paphos, Cyprus
18:00	Dimitrios Ioannou (yellow card)	Report	47' Giannis Okkas; 90+3' Ricardo Laborde	Stadium: Pafiako Stadium; Attendance: 1,615; Referee: (Cyprus) Christos Elia; Man of the Match: Giannis Okkas

23 December 2012 Match day 15	Enosis Neon Paralimni (Cyprus)	1–2	(Cyprus) Anorthosis Famagusta	Paralimni, Cyprus
18:00	Andreas Constantinou 3'; Andreas Constantinou (yellow card); Andreas Constantinou (red card); Demetris Moulazimis (yellow card); Faria (yellow card)	Report	48' Ricardo Laborde; 84' Juliano Spadacio; (yellow card) Paulo Jorge; (yellow card) Jan Rezek; (yellow card) Marko Andic	Stadium: Paralimni Stadium; Attendance: 3,200; Referee: (Cyprus) Marios Panagi; Man of the Match: Juliano Spadacio

5 January 2012 Match day 16	Anorthosis Famagusta (Cyprus)	3–0	(Cyprus) Doxa Katokopias	Larnaka, Cyprus
18:00	Jan Rezek 23'; Branko Ilic (yellow card); Barak Yitzhaki 57'; Paulo Jorge (yellow card); Juliano Spadacio 90'	Report	(yellow card) Stefanos Siontis; (yellow card) Tiago Conceição	Stadium: Antonis Papadopoulos Stadium; Attendance: 7.000; Referee: (Cyprus) Andonis Christodoulou; Man of the Match: Toni Calvo

14 January 2013 Match day 17	Alki Larnaca (Cyprus)	0–3	(Cyprus) Anorthosis Famagusta	Larnaka, Cyprus
19:00	Cafu (yellow card); Santamaria (yellow card); Bruno Fernandes (yellow card)	Report	17' Giannis Okkas; (yellow card) Valentinos Sielis; 30' Giannis Okkas; 57' Juliano Spadacio; (yellow card) Vincent Laban	Stadium: GSZ Stadium; Attendance: 3.000; Referee: (Cyprus) Marios Panagi; Man of the Match: Giannis Okkas

20 January 2013 Match day 18	Anorthosis Famagusta (Cyprus)	0–0	(Cyprus) Apollon Limassol	Larnaka, Cyprus
14:30	Juliano Spadacio (yellow card); Giannis Skopelitis (yellow card); Paulo Jorge (red card)	Report	(yellow card) Horacio Cardozo; (yellow card) Angelis Charalambous; (yellow card) Ivan Parlov; (yellow card) Andreas Stavrou; (yellow card) Giorgos Merkis; (yellow card) (yellow-red card) Giorgos Merkis	Stadium: Antonis Papadopoulos Stadium; Attendance: 7.500; Referee: (Cyprus) Demetris Chrisostomou

26 January 2013 Match day 19	Omonia Nicosia (Cyprus)	1–3	(Cyprus) Anorthosis Famagusta	Nicosia, Cyprus
14:30	Andre Alves (yellow card) 58' (goal) 90'; João Paulo Andrade (yellow card) 77'; Nuno Assis (yellow card) 85'; Spungin (yellow card) 88'	Report	(yellow card) 20' Laborde; (yellow card) 22' Sielis; (yellow card) 55' Juliano Spadacio; 55', 65' Yitzhaki; (red card) 85' (goal) 77' Rezek; (yellow card) 86' Andić	Stadium: GSP Stadium; Attendance: 10,217; Referee: (Cyprus) Giannis Anastasiou; Man of the Match: Barak Yitzhaki

3 February 2013 Match day 20	Anorthosis Famagusta (Cyprus)	4–3	(Cyprus) Olympiakos Nicosia	Larnaka, Cyprus
18:00	Barak Yitzhaki 25'; Okkas 28'; Colin (yellow card) 55'; Barak Yitzhaki 59'; Barak Yitzhaki 65'; Laban (yellow card) 67'; Alexa (yellow card) 84'	Report	(yellow card) 19' Lamine N'Dao; (yellow card) 22' Marcos Michael; 33' Gaetano Monachello; (yellow card) 33' Gaetano Monachello; 51' Marcos Michael; 54' Gaetano Monachello; (yellow card) 85' Giorgos Karkotis	Stadium: Antonis Papadopoulos Stadium; Attendance: 6,000; Referee: (Cyprus) Charalambos Skapoullis; Man of the Match: Barak Yitzhaki

10 February 2013 Match day 21	Nea Salmis Famagusta (Cyprus)	2–1	(Cyprus) Anorthosis Famagusta	Larnaka, Cyprus
18:00	Armend Alimi 62'; Hélio Roque (yellow card); Nikos Englezou 62'; Sotirović (yellow card); Jimmy Modeste (yellow card)	Report	(yellow card) Christos Mastrou; (yellow card) Branko Ilič; 80' Ricardo Laborde; (yellow card) Andreas Avraam; (yellow card) Toni Calvo	Stadium: Ammochostos Stadium; Attendance: 1.750; Referee: (Cyprus) Marios Panagi

25 February 2013 Match day 22	Anorthosis Famagusta (Cyprus)	5–1	(Cyprus) Ayia Napa	Larnaka, Cyprus
19:00	Juliano Spadacio 47' (pen.); Barak Yitzhaki 54'; Juliano Spadacio 63' (pen.); Moshe Ohayon 81'; Toni Calvo 90+1'	Report	51' Martinos Solomou; (yellow card) Nikolaos Barboudis; (yellow card) Ginho	Stadium: Antonis Papadopoulos Stadium; Attendance: 5.250; Referee: (Cyprus) Demetris Massias; Man of the Match: Juliano Spadacio

2 March 2013 Match day 23	Ethnikos Achna (Cyprus)	2–2	(Cyprus) Anorthosis Famagusta	Achna, Cyprus
18:00	Elpidoforos Elia (yellow card); Ernad Skulić 45+1'; Ernad Skulić (yellow card); Emmanuel Kenmogne 68'; Levan Maghradze (yellow card)	Report	57' Barak Yitzhaki; (yellow card) Rui Duarte; 76' Barak Yitzhaki	Stadium: Dasaki Stadium; Attendance: 2.375; Referee: (Cyprus) Marios Nicolau

10 March 2013 Match day 24	Anorthosis Famagusta (Cyprus)	1–1	(Cyprus) AEK Larnaca	Larnaka, Cyprus
15:30	Ricardo Laborde 11'; Barak Yitzhaki (yellow card); Jan Rezek (yellow card)	Report	(yellow card) Eleftherios Mertakas; 39' Alex da Silva; (yellow card) David Català	Stadium: Antonis Papadopoulos Stadium; Attendance: 7.000; Referee: (Cyprus) Leontios Trattos

Match day 25	AEL Limassol (Cyprus)	1–1	(Cyprus) Anorthosis Famagusta	Limassol, Cyprus
		[Report]		Stadium: Tsirion Stadium

Match day 26	Anorthosis Famagusta (Cyprus)	0–2	(Cyprus) APOEL Nicosia	Larnaka, Cyprus
		[Report]		Stadium: Antonis Papadopoulos Stadium

=== Goal Scorers ===
R	Player	Pos	Goals
1	(Brazil) Juliano Spadacio	AM	14
2	(Czech Republic) Jan Rezek	RW	12
3	(Israel) Barak Yitzhaki	CF	10
4	(Cyprus) Giannis Okkas	CF	7
5	(Colombia) Ricardo Laborde	MF	6
6	(Spain) Toni Calvo	RW	3
7	(Brazil) William Boaventura	DF	1
7	(Brazil) Evandro Roncatto	CF	1
7	(Slovenia) Branko Ilič	RB	1
7	(Cyprus) Andreas Avraam	LB	1

=== Results by round ===
Round	1	2	3	4	5	6	7	8	9	10	11	12	13	14	15	16	17	18	19	20	21	22	23	24	25	26	27	28	29	30	31	32
Ground	H	H	A	H	A	H	A	H	A	H	A	H	A	A	A	H	A	H	A	H	A	H	A	H	A	H	H	A				
Result	W	D	W	W	W	W	W	W	W	W	W	D	W	W	W	W	W	D	W	W	L	W	D	D	D	L	L	D				
Position	3	5	3	3	1	2	2	2	2	1	1	1	1	1	1	1	1	1	1	1	1	1	1	2	2	2	2	2				

Updated to match(es) played on 13 April 2013. Source: anorthosisfc.com
A = Away; H = Home; W = Win; D = Draw; L = Loss

=== Classification ===
Pos	Team	Pld	W	D	L	GF	GA	GD	Pts	Qualification or relegation
1	APOEL	26	21	3	2	56	10	+46	66	Qualification for second round, Group A
2	Anorthosis Famagusta	26	18	6	2	57	21	+36	60	Qualification for second round, Group A
3	AEK Larnaca	26	17	4	5	50	21	+29	55	Qualification for second round, Group A
4	Omonia Nicosia	26	16	5	5	51	22	+29	53	Qualification for second round, Group A
5	AEL Limassol	26	14	9	3	46	26	+20	51	Qualification for second round, Group B

Source: CFA
Rules for classification: 1) points; 2) head-to-head points; 3) head-to-head goal difference; 4) head-to-head away goals scored; 5) goal difference; 6) number of goals scored

=== Play-offs table ===
The first 12 teams are divided into 3 groups. Points are carried over from the regular season.

==== Group A ====
Pos	Team	Pld	W	D	L	GF	GA	GD	Pts	Qualification
1	APOEL (C)	32	23	4	5	62	19	+43	73	Qualification for Champions League third qualifying round
2	Anorthosis Famagusta	32	20	8	4	60	29	+31	68	Qualification for Europa League second qualifying round
3	Omonia Nicosia	32	20	6	6	66	27	+39	66	Qualification for Europa League second qualifying round
4	AEK Larnaca	32	19	4	9	55	28	+27	61	

Source: UEFA
Rules for classification: 1) points; 2) head-to-head points; 3) head-to-head goal difference; 4) head-to-head goals scored; 5) goal difference; 6) number of goals scored.
(C) Champions

== Cypriot Cup ==
31 October 2012 1st Round	Onisilos Sotira	0–2	Anorthosis Famagusta	Sotira, Cyprus
14:00		Report	Emil Jula 12'; Emil Jula 46'	Stadium: Sotira Stadium; Attendance: 600; Referee: (Cyprus) Antonis Christodoulou; Man of the Match: Emil Jula

9 January 2013 2nd Round First Leg	Anorthosis Famagusta	1–1	Alki Larnaca	Larnaca, Cyprus
18:00	Emil Jula 46'	Summary	14' Vasconcelos	Stadium: Antonis Papadopoulos Stadium; Attendance: 2,000; Referee: (Cyprus) Charalambos Skapoullis

23 January 2013 2nd Round Second Leg	Alki Larnaca	1–2 (a.e.t.) (2–3 agg.)	Anorthosis Famagusta	Larnaca, Cyprus
18:00	Yitzhaki 25' (o.g.); Nakajima-Farran (red card) 82'	Summary	38' Yitzhaki; 96' Okkas	Stadium: GSZ Stadium; Attendance: 2,000; Referee: (Cyprus) Leontios Trattou

19 February 2013 Quarter Final First Leg	Omonia Nicosia	4–0	Anorthosis Famagusta	Nicosia, Cyprus
				Stadium: GSP Stadium

26 February 2013 Quarter Final Second Leg	Anorthosis Famagusta	0–2 (0–6 agg.)	Omonia Nicosia	Larnaca, Cyprus
				Stadium: Antonis Papadopoulos Stadium

=== Goal Scorers ===
R	Player	Pos	Goals
1	(Romania) Emil Jula	CF	2

== Squad statistics ==
				Total				Cypriot First Division		Cypriot Cup		UEFA Europa League		
N	Pos.	Name	Nat.	GS	App	Gls	Min	App	Gls	App	Gls	App	Gls	Notes
1	GK	Srđan Blažić	(Montenegro)	4	4		360					4		Not Registered
2	LB	Marko Andic	(Serbia)	11	13		1064	11		1		1		
3	CB	Paulo Jorge	(Portugal)	12	12		937	8				4		
4	CB	Jurgen Colin	(Netherlands)	13	14		1131	9		1		4		
5	DM	Dan Alexa	(Romania)	13	13		1132	8		1		4		
7	RW	Toni Calvo	(Spain)	9	11	4	702	7	2	1		3	2	
8	AM	Juliano Spadacio	(Brazil)	15	15	10	1255	11	9			4	1	
9	CF	Giannis Okkas	(Cyprus)	10	16	5	855	11	3	1		4	2	Captain
10	AM	Barak Yitzhaki	(Israel)	4	7	1	394	6	1	1				On Loan
11	CF	Evandro Roncatto	(Brazil)	3	8	1	287	4	1	1		3		
16	GK	Mathieu Valverde	(France)	12	12		1070	11		1				
17	RW	Jan Rezek	(Czech Republic)	11	15	8	1064	11	8			4		
18	DM	Giorgos Sielis	(Cyprus)											
19	DM	Giannis Skopelitis	(Greece)	9	10		825	10						
20	DM	Vincent Laban	(Cyprus)	8	12		637	8				4		vice-captain
21	LW	Ricardo Laborde	(Colombia)	11	12	4	892	8	2			4	2	
23	DM	Valentinos Sielis	(Cyprus)	7	7		614	6		1				
24	RB	Pedro Almeida	(Portugal)											
27	CF	Emil Jula	(Romania)	1	3	2	151	2		1	2			On Loan
31	GK	Christos Mastrou	(Cyprus)											
32	GK	Gavriel Constantinou	(Cyprus)											
33	RB	Branko Ilič	(Slovenia)	13	13	1	1240	8	1	1		4		
40	CB	Demetris Economou	(Cyprus)		1		14			1				
41	LW	Panayiotis Loizides	(Cyprus)											
42	AM	Adamos Andreou	(Cyprus)											
43	RW	Constantinos Laifis	(Cyprus)											
88	LB	William Boaventura	(Brazil)	7	7	1	630	3	1			4		
99	DM	Moshe Ohayon	(Israel)	4	13		446	8		1		4		

Last updated: 27 October 2012
Source: anorthosis.com
Ordered by start team and position on pitch (from back right to front left), minutes played, squad number
0 shown as blank

=== Disciplinary record ===
N	P	Nat.	Name	Championship			Europa League			Cypriot Cup			Others			Total			Notes
N	P	Nat.	Name	Yellow card	Second yellow card	Red card	Yellow card	Second yellow card	Red card	Yellow card	Second yellow card	Red card	Yellow card	Second yellow card	Red card	Yellow card	Second yellow card	Red card	Notes
3	CB	(Portugal)	Paulo Jorge	3		1										3		1	
20	AM	(Cyprus)	Vincent Laban	2					1							2		1	
10	AM	(Israel)	Barak Yitzhaki			1												1	
33	RB	(Slovenia)	Branko Ilič	1	1		1									2	1		
19	DM	(Greece)	Giannis Skopelitis	4	1											4	1		
23	LB	(Cyprus)	Valentinos Sielis	3	1											3	1		
5	DM	(Romania)	Dan Alexa	7			2									9			
21	LW	(Colombia)	Ricardo Laborde	5												5			
4	CB	(Netherlands)	Jurgen Colin	2			2									4			
9	CF	(Cyprus)	Giannis Okkas	3			1									4			
2	LB	(Slovakia)	Marko Andic	3												3			
10	AM	(Brazil)	Juliano Spadacio	3												3			
7	RW	(Czech Republic)	Jan Rezek	3												3			
7	RW	(Spain)	Toni Calvo	1												1			
27	CF	(Romania)	Emil Jula	1												1			
11	CF	(Brazil)	Evandro Roncatto				1									1			
Players		16	Card totals	39	3	2	7	0	1	0	0	0	0	0	0	40	1	2	

Last updated: 28 July 2012
Source: Competitive matches and Cfa.com.cy, Anorthosis.com
Ordered by (red card) , (second yellow card) and (yellow card)
(yellow card) = Number of bookings; (second yellow card) = Number of sending offs after a second yellow card; (red card) = Number of sending offs by a direct red card.

- 4 (yellow card) one match ban
- 6 (yellow card) one match ban
- 8 (yellow card) one match ban
- 10 (yellow card) one match ban
- 12+ (yellow card) one match ban per card
- 1+1 (yellow card) (yellow-red card) one match ban – (red card) 1–4 match ban

Bans

- Barak Yitzhaki (3 Match BAN from the championship 3–5 match day)
- Vincent Laban (3 Match BAN from European competitions)

=== Top 5 players rankings ===
R	Player	Position	MVP	Points
1	(Brazil) Juliano Spadacio	AM	5	32
2	(Cyprus) Giannis Okkas	CF	6	28.5
3	(Colombia) Ricardo Laborde	LW	3	22.5
4	(Czech Republic) Jan Rezek	RW	1	19
5	(Spain) Toni Calvo	RW	3	16.5

Goals - Assist

- Championship = 1.5 Points
- Europa League = 1.5 Points
- Cypriot Cup = 1 Points
- Times MVP = 1*Times

=== Most Valuable Players ===
R	Player	Position	Age	Market Value
1	(Colombia) Ricardo Laborde	LW	24	€10.000.000
2	(Cyprus) Vincent Laban	AM	28	€3.500.000
3	(Brazil) Evandro Roncatto	CF	25	€2.500.000
4	(Spain) Toni Calvo	RW	25	€1.800.000
5	(Czech Republic) Jan Rezek	RW	30	€1.200.000

Last updated: 2 April 2012
