= Adamo (disambiguation) =

Adamo is an Italian personal name.

Adamo may also refer to:

- Adamo, Mozambique, village in Ancuabe District in Cabo Delgado Province in northeastern Mozambique
- Adamo Demolition or the Adamo Group, a Detroit-based asbestos remediation and demolition company
- Dell Adamo, line of Dell laptops

== See also ==
- Adamos (disambiguation)
