= Seefeld =

Seefeld may refer to:

== Places ==
- Seefeld in Tirol, a tourist resort in Tyrol, Austria
- Seefeld, Bavaria, a town in Starnberg, Bavaria, Germany
  - Seefeld Castle
- Seefeld, Schleswig-Holstein, a municipality in Rendsburg-Eckernförde, Schleswig-Holstein, Germany
- Seefeld (Zürich), a district of Zürich, Switzerland

== People ==
- Martín Seefeld (born 1960), Argentine actor
