= Adamo =

- Gender: Male
- Language: Italian

Origin
- Meaning: Italian form of Adam

Other names
- See also: Adam, Adem

Adamo is both a masculine given name and a surname. Notable people with the name include:

== Given name ==
- Adamo Abate (c. 990 – 1060–1070), Italian medieval Benedictine abbot and saint, a promoter of the unification of the Southern populations in Italy under Roger II of Sicily
- Adamo Boari (1863–1928), Italian civil engineer and architect
- Adamo Pedro Bronzoni (born 1985), Italian–Peruvian film and video editor and producer
- Adamo Chiusole (1728–1787), Italian count, painter and art historian
- Adamo Coulibaly (born 1981), French footballer of Ivorian origin
- Adamo Paolo Cultraro (born 1973), Italian–American filmmaker, director, writer and producer
- Adamo Didur (1874–1946), Polish operatic bass singer
- Adamo Dionisi (1965–2024), Italian actor
- Adamo Gentile (1615–1662), Roman Catholic prelate who served as Bishop of Lipari
- Adamo Nagalo (born 2002), Ivorian-born Ghanaian-Burkinabe footballer
- Adamo Rossi (1821–1891), Italian clergyman, revolutionary patriot, scholar and librarian
- Adamo Ruggiero (born 1986), Canadian actor
- Adamo Scultori (1530–1585), also referred to as Adamo Ghisi, Italian engraver, sculptor and artist
- Adamo Tadolini (1788–1863), Italian sculptor

== Middle name ==
- Luc Adamo Matéta (born 1949), Congolese politician
- Paula Adamo DeSutter, United States Assistant Secretary of State for Verification, Compliance, and Implementation (2002–2009)

== Surname ==
- Amelia Adamo (born 1947), Swedish editor-in-chief
- Andrea Adamo (footballer) (born 1991), Italian footballer
- Andrea Adamo (racing manager) (born 1971), Italian engineer and racing manager
- Antonio Adamo (born 1957), Italian pornographic film director
- Christine Adamo (born 1965), French writer
- Délizia Adamo (1952–2020), Italian–Belgian singer known by the mononym Délizia
- Donna Adamo (born 1970), American retired professional wrestling valet and professional wrestler, better known by her ring name Elektra
- Emma Adamo (born c. 1963), British businesswoman
- Frank Adamo (1893–1988), American doctor honored for his medical service during World War II
- Giulia Adamo (born 1949), Italian politician
- Mark Adamo (born 1962), American composer, librettist and professor of music composition
- Matteo Marchisano-Adamo (born 1973), American sound designer, film editor, composer
- Michaël Moussa Adamo (1961–2023), Gabonese politician and diplomat
- Momo Adamo (1895–1956), Italian American mobster in the American Mafia
- Nicola Adamo (born 1959), Italian politician
- Peter D'Adamo, naturopathic physician and advocate of the Blood type diet
- Salvatore Adamo (born 1943), Italian–Belgian composer and singer also known as Adamo
- Valentín Adamo (born 2002), Uruguayan footballer
