= Valentinos Sielis =

Cypriot footballer (born 1990)

Personal information
- Full name: Valentinos Sielis
- Date of birth: 1 March 1990 (age 36)
- Place of birth: Paphos, Cyprus
- Height: 1.89 m (6 ft 2 in)
- Positions: Centre-back; full-back

Team information
- Current team: Doxa Katokopias
- Number: 4

Youth career
- 2000–2002: Arsenal
- 2002–2007: Tottenham Hotspur

Senior career*
Years	Team	Apps	(Gls)
2007–2008	Doncaster Rovers	0	(0)
2008–2009	Thoi Lakatamia	3	(0)
2009–2014	Anorthosis Famagusta	62	(0)
2014–2017	AEL Limassol	65	(3)
2017–2019	Gangwon FC	68	(3)
2020	Jeju United	3	(0)
2021–2023	Busan IPark	49	(3)
2023−	Doxa Katokopias	10	(0)

International career^{‡}
2009–2012	Cyprus U21	8	(2)
2011–	Cyprus	14	(1)
- * Club domestic league appearances and goals as of 27 May 2024 ‡ National team caps and goals as of 22 March 2017

Valentinos Sielis (Greek: Βαλεντίνος Σιέλης; born 1 March 1990) is a Cypriot professional footballer who plays as a centre back for Doxa Katokopias FC.

In 2014, he signed with AEL. Sielis is a Cypriot international and made his debut on 9 February 2011, against Romania in the CytaVision Cyprus Tournament 2011.

He was awarded the best youth player in Cyprus in May 2012.

== Early life ==
Sielis was born in Paphos, a town in Cyprus. He is the second born of three siblings. Valentinos has two brothers, also footballers. The eldest, Giorgos, plays for AEK Kouklia, and the youngest, Christos, plays for Panetolikos.

== Club career ==
=== Early career ===
Sielis began his career in England first in Arsenal F.C. U12, Tottenham F.C. U13, the first professional team for Doncaster Rovers, Sielis signed with local club of Enosis Neon Thoi Lakatamia FC, and after a great season he moved to Anorthosis Famagusta. In 2014, he moved to AEL, where he has played consistently well since joining.

=== Anorthosis Famagusta ===
Sielis joined Anorthosis at 15 June 2009 from Enosis Neon Thoi Lakatamia FC as a free agent.

Sielis made his team debut as 30th-minute substitute in a 0–3 away victory over Othellos Athienou F.C. for Cypriot Cup on 23 September 2009. he play as a first time in a European competition on the starting squad in a 1–2 home defeat from CSKA Moscow in Antonis Papadopoulos Stadium for the UEFA Europa League 4th qualifying round. He made his debut at the 72nd minute in Cypus first division in a 2–1 home victory over Olympiakos Nicosia. At the end of the season he played for 18 matches, 10 of them as a substitution, with 875 minutes of total playing time. On 8 May 2011, Sielis played for a first time in a Derby on the basic squad in a 1–0 away defeat from Omonia Nicosia. For the season 2011–12, during the period with coach Stanimir Stoilov, Sielis was a basic player of Anorthosis in the European competitions with 3 appearances in 4 matches, all as a substitution. After the arrival of Ronny Levy, Sielis played 4 times, once on the basic squad against Olympiakos Nicosia. For the season 2012–13, Sielis, Began the season as the second left back of the team. After the announcement that William Boaventura end his career, Sielis became the main left back for the team. From 8th until 19th match day Sielis starts all the matches in the basic line-up. In March 2013, Sielis had a serious injury and he underwent surgery. As a result, the team lost all the other matches until the end of the season.

== Outside football ==
=== Volunteering ===
Valentinos Sielis is particularly sensitive to issues related to helping our fellowmen. In the transmission of reckoning AEL Limassol – Anorthosis from CytaVision, Savvas Kosiaris, some time before the incident with Kaluđerović said that Sielis was a compatible bone marrow transplant donor and his altruism helped a fellow human to stay alive.

=== Heroic act – Kaluđerović serious injury ===
At 26 April 2014, the striker of AEL Limassol, Andrija Kaluđerović claimed the ball with Paulo Jorge and seemed to hit the head of his opponent, with Kaluđerović to fall to the ground unconscious. The broadcaster of Cytavision who was at the soccer ground, said that Kaluđerović swallowed his tongue and Sielis of Anorthosis had brought him back, when the Cypriot swiftly gave him first aid.

== Career statistics ==
As of 9 October 2022.

Club	Season	League			Cup		Europe		Total	
Club	Season	Division	Apps	Goals	Apps	Goals	Apps	Goals	Apps	Goals
Doncaster Rovers	2007–08	EFL League One	—		—		—		—	
Enosis Neon Thoi Lakatamia	2008–09	Cypriot Second Division	3	0	—		—		3	0
Anorthosis Famagusta	2009–10	Cypriot First Division	0	0	2	0	1	0	3	0
Anorthosis Famagusta	2010–11	Cypriot First Division	17	0	0	0	1	0	18	0
Anorthosis Famagusta	2011–12	Cypriot First Division	17	0	0	0	3	0	20	0
Anorthosis Famagusta	2012–13	Cypriot First Division	16	0	3	0	0	0	19	0
Anorthosis Famagusta	2013–14	Cypriot First Division	17	0	2	0	0	0	19	0
Anorthosis Famagusta	Total		67	0	7	0	5	0	79	0
AEL Limassol	2014–15	Cypriot First Division	23	1	6	1	5	0	34	2
AEL Limassol	2015–16	Cypriot First Division	24	1	4	0	—		28	1
AEL Limassol	2016–17	Cypriot First Division	18	1	2	0	—		20	1
AEL Limassol	Total		65	3	12	1	5	0	82	4
Gangwon FC	2017	K League 1	7	1	0	0	—		7	1
Gangwon FC	2018	K League 1	32	0	0	0	—		32	0
Gangwon FC	2019	K League 1	24	2	0	0	—		24	2
Gangwon FC	Total		63	3	0	0	0	0	63	3
Jeju United	2020	K League 2	3	0	3	0	—		6	0
Busan IPark	2021	K League 2	24	1	0	0	—		24	1
Busan IPark	2022	K League 2	25	2	2	0	—		27	2
Busan IPark	Total		49	3	2	0	0	0	51	3
Career total			250	9	24	1	10	0	284	10

=== International goals ===
Scores and results list Cyprus' goal tally first.

No	Date	Venue	Opponent	Score	Result	Competition
1.	13 November 2016	GSP Stadium, Nicosia, Cyprus	Gibraltar	3–1	3–1	2018 FIFA World Cup qualification

== International career ==
Sielis was the captain of Cyprus national team under 21, with 8 appearances and 2 goals. On 3 September 2010 Sielis scored his first goal with the national team under 21 in an away victory 1–3 over Norway under-21 football team.

On 26 March 2010, Sielis made his debut with the national team of Cyprus in the home draw 0–0 against Iceland. In 2012–13, Sielis played in 2 of national team matches, in a home victory 1–0 against Iceland, and in away defeat 2–1 from Slovenia.

== Honours ==
=== Individual ===
- Best player of the year in Cyprus
  - Best youth Footballer: 2012
