= Adamos =

Adamos is a given name and a surname. It may refer to:

- Adamos Adamou (born 1950), Cypriot politician and Member of the European Parliament
- Adamos Andreou (born 1994), Cypriot footballer
- Ian Adamos (born 1988), Guamanian international footballer

== See also ==
- Adamo, a name
- Adamov (disambiguation)
