= Requiem for a Fish =

2005 novel by Christine Adamo

- Cover of French edition
- Author: Christine Adamo
- Original title: Requiem pour un poisson
- Language: French
- Genre: Crime novel
- Publisher: Liana Levi
- Publication date: 7 January 2005
- Publication place: France
- Media type: Print
- Pages: 348 pp (first edition)
- ISBN: 2-86746-378-5

Requiem pour un poisson (Requiem for a Fish) is a 2005 novel by French author Christine Adamo.

== Plot ==
The coelacanth is an ancient species of fish that might have been the missing link between land and sea. Many people believed that it had disappeared long before the dinosaurs' extinction. However, one day in 1938, a South African fisherman catches a specimen in his nets. But is the fish really the famous coelacanth? The world of science gets passionate and jealous around the beast. The book keeps up the suspense on who will be the one to trace it back to mankind. Stealing, cheating, lying and even murdering. An unlikely main character; young, pregnant, and Parisian named Marie, ends up getting caught up in the story.

Between Africa and the Comoro Islands, Sulawesi, London and Paris, the world of ichthyology turns into a gripping thriller.

== Release details ==
- 2005, France, Liana Levi, ISBN 2-86746-378-5, Pub date 7 January 2005
- 2006, France, Folio policier (Gallimard), ISBN 2-07-033658-1, Pub date 4 April 2006
- 2006, Netherlands ("Requiem vor een vis"), De Geus, ISBN 90-445-0705-2, Pub date 2006
- 2007, Italy ("Requiem per il Celacanto"), Effemme Edizioni, ISBN 978-88-87321-28-9, Pub date 2007
