= Giorgos Sielis =

Cypriot footballer

Personal information
- Full name: Giorgos Sielis
- Date of birth: October 23, 1986 (age 40)
- Place of birth: Paphos, Cyprus
- Height: 1.83 m (6 ft 0 in)
- Position: Midfielder

Youth career
- 2004–2005: Northallerton Town
- 2005–2006: Charlton Athletic
- 2006–2007: Redditch United

Senior career*
Years	Team	Apps	(Gls)
2007–2008	Chaidari	14	(0)
2008–2009	Apollon Limassol	0	(0)
2009	→Olympiakos Nicosia (loan)	7	(0)
2009–2012	AEP Paphos	55	(4)
2012	Anorthosis Famagusta	0	(0)
2013	AEP Paphos	6	(0)
2013–2014	AEK Kouklia	21	(1)
2014–2016	Pafos FC	30	(2)
2016–2017	Akritas Chlorakas	15	(2)
2018	Richmond SC	5	(1)
- * Club domestic league appearances and goals as of March 2018 ‡ National team caps and goals as of 9 December 2011

Giorgos Sielis (Greek: Γιώργος Σιέλης; born October 23, 1986) is a retired Cypriot football player. He is the brother of the international defender of Jeju United Valentinos Sielis.
