= Seefeld Castle =

- Schloß Seefeld
- Seefeld, Bavaria
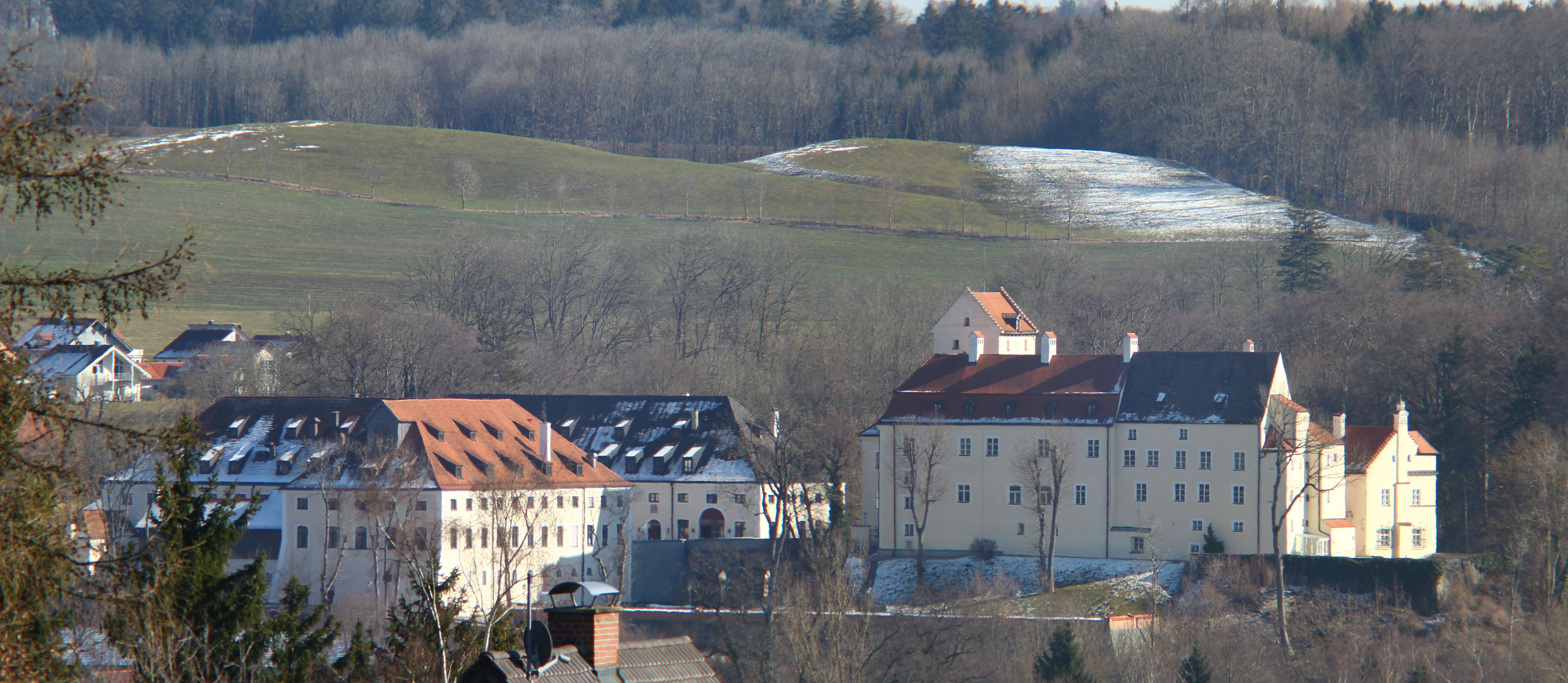
- View of the castle

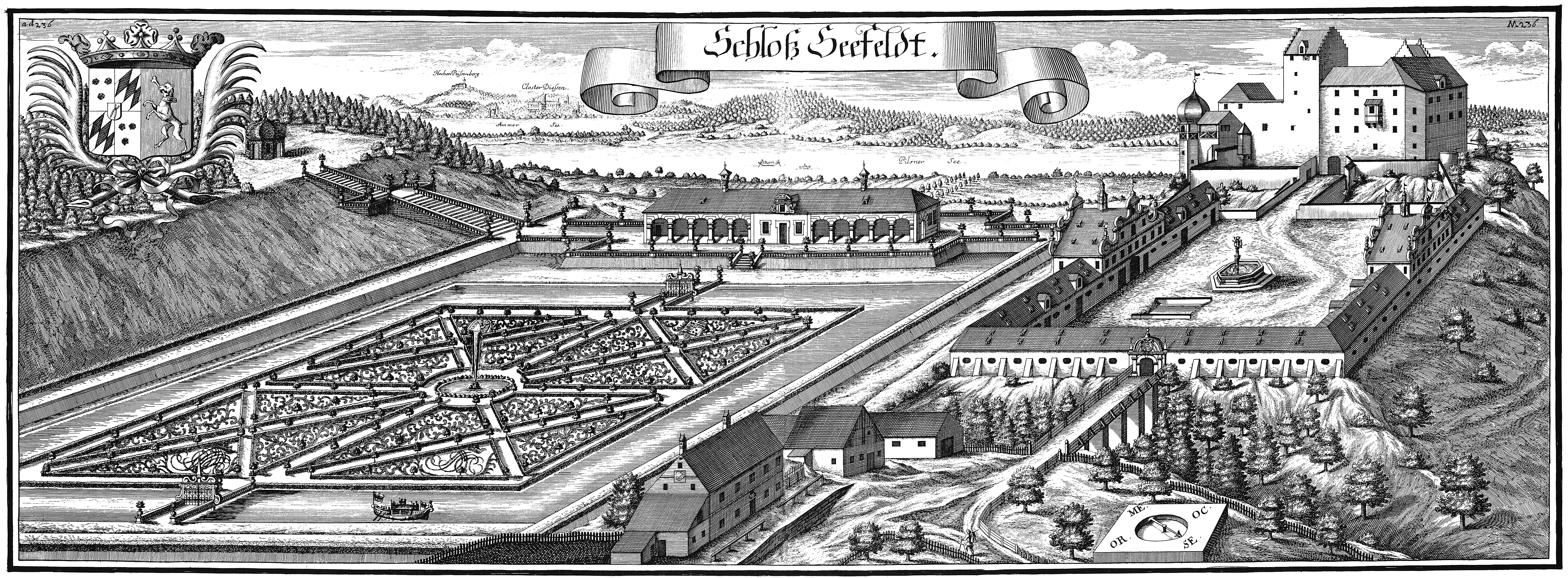
- View of the castle c.1700 by Michael Wening

Location
- Location in Bavaria
- Location within Bavaria
- Coordinates: 48.031°N 11.203889°E

Site history
- Built: c.1302

Seefeld Castle (German: Schloß Seefeld) is a castle in Seefeld, Bavaria, that has its origins in a 13th-century building but has since been extensively modified. Today it serves in part as a museum. A large park extends to the south of the castle.

== Building ==
Seefeld castle lies on the east shore of the Pilsensee. It is entered by a massive brick bridge over the Höllengraben to the fountain courtyard, built in 1674 after a wooden bridge had collapsed. The gate was built in 1736 in rococo style, with a gable that holds an impressive stone carving of the arms of the counts of Toerring-Jettenbach. The courtyard, with its 1733 fountain, is framed by strong 18th century farm buildings designed for stabling and brewing. A second bridge leads into the inner courtyard. Built on 10th century foundations, the donjon was mainly built in the 13th century and renovated in 1500.

== History ==
The domain of Sevuelt am Pilsensee (Seefeld) was owned by the lords of Seefeld. In 1150 Count Berchthold von Andechs obtained part of the forest from the Benedictine abbey. In the 12th and 13th centuries the lords of Seefeld acquired large estates. The castle is mentioned for the first time in 1302. The keep was built in the middle of the 13th century on a rocky spur above the Pilsensee. The small tower in the southwest of the castle shown on Michael Wening's 1700 drawing was probably older, as was the old north building. The Gothic hall and curtain wall were probably built at the same time as the keep.

The first chapel was built in the mid-14th century, first mentioned in 1365. In 1479 this chapel was replaced by the new one built between the keep and the curtain wall by Seyfried von Toerring and inaugurated on 28 December 1479. Also in 1479 a fortified tower was built in the southeast of the castle complex. In 1500 the tower and the donjon were restored. A brewery was built at Seefeld in 1601. The bridge collapsed in 1674 and was rebuilt at high cost in brick.

The Counts of Toerring-Jettenbach, followers of the Wittelsbachs from the 14th century, were very influential at the court of the Electorate and Kingdom of Bavaria. In 1730 Count Ignaz Felix von Törring-Jettenbach was made field marshal of Bavaria. Extensive construction was undertaken from 1730 onward, including a new brewery, cowshed and barn, an upgrade to the sawmill, replacement of the inner castle bridge, erection of a fountain in the outer courtyard and reconstruction of the gatehouse. The chapel also received much of its present furnishings in this period. In 1766 an extension was added on the east side. The chapel was rebuilt in 1775–76 and a French roof replaced the older steep gable roof of the castle. The lodge to the southwest was built by Gabriel Seidl in 1897.

== Today ==
In recent years the grounds and buildings have been renovated by the owner, Graf Hans Caspar zu Törring-Jettenbach. The castle is now the home of various businesses, craftsman and vendors. There is a wide-screen cinema, a museum and a hall in the southern wing of the castle that is used for events. A brew pub has been open since the mid-1990s in one of the castle buildings, offering Bavarian cuisine.

The first floor of the castle holds a hall richly decorated with stucco and paintings, divided by marble Corinthian pilasters on ocher stucco bases. It includes reliefs of musical instruments, game and fruit, and portraits. The first and second floors of the north wing, connected by two stairways, have been used for special exhibitions. During 2000-09 two floors of the castle held two annual exhibitions of Egyptian art from the Staatliche Sammlung für Ägyptische Kunst (State Museum of Egyptian Art) then located in the Munich Residenz.

== Gallery ==
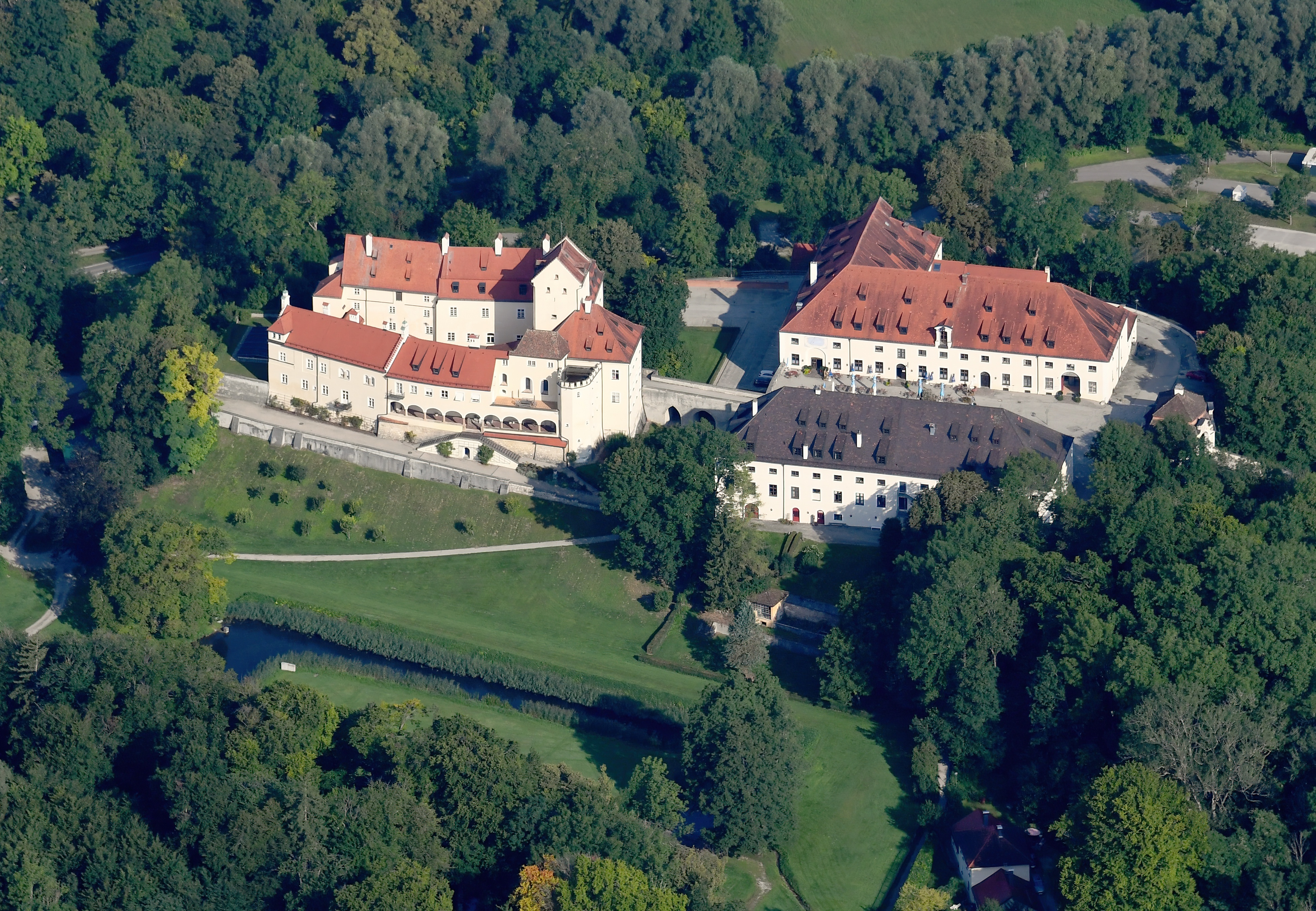
Aerial view of the Seefeld Castle

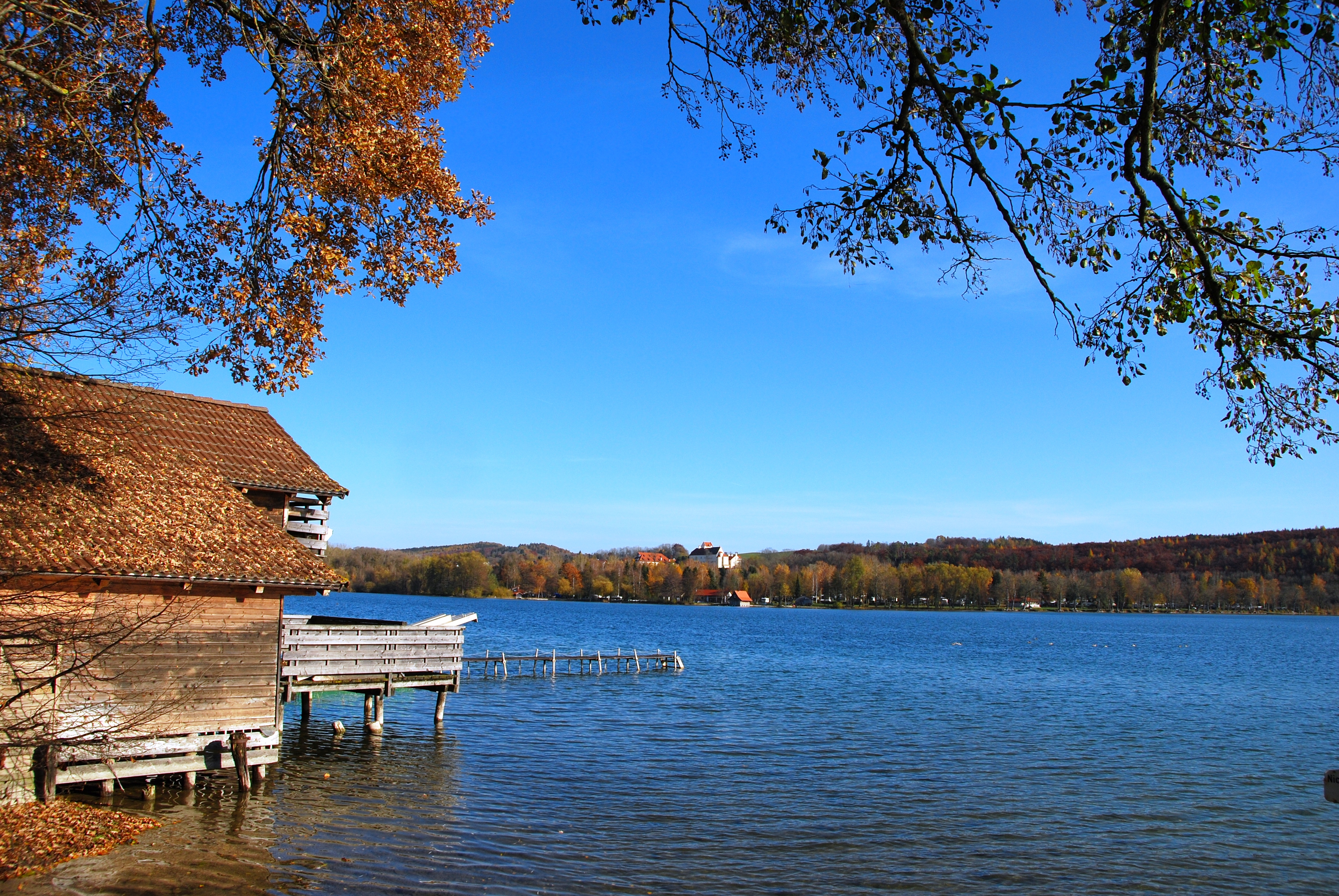
View from across the Pilsensee

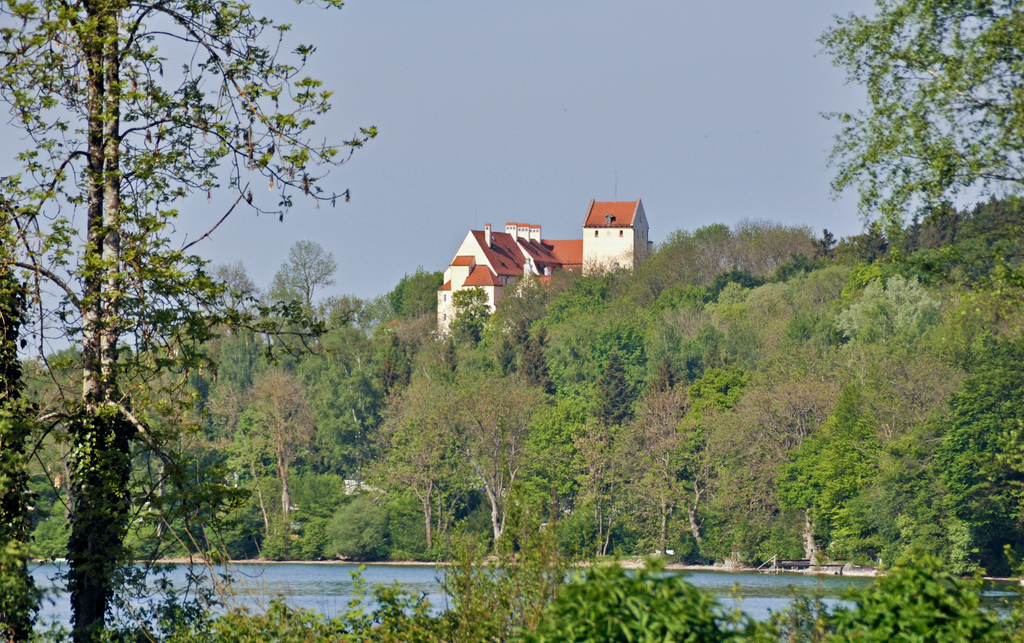
View from the Pilsensee shore

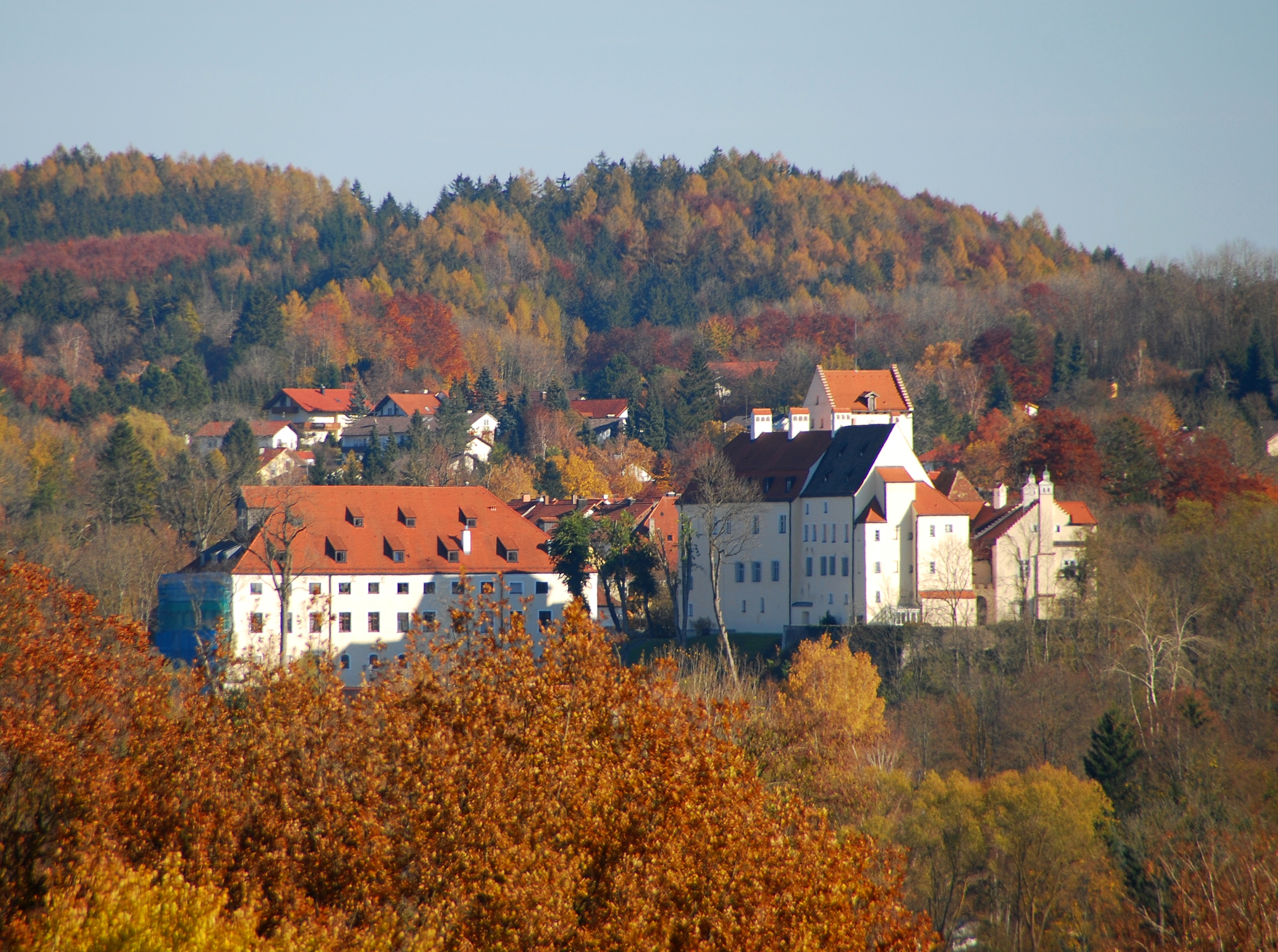

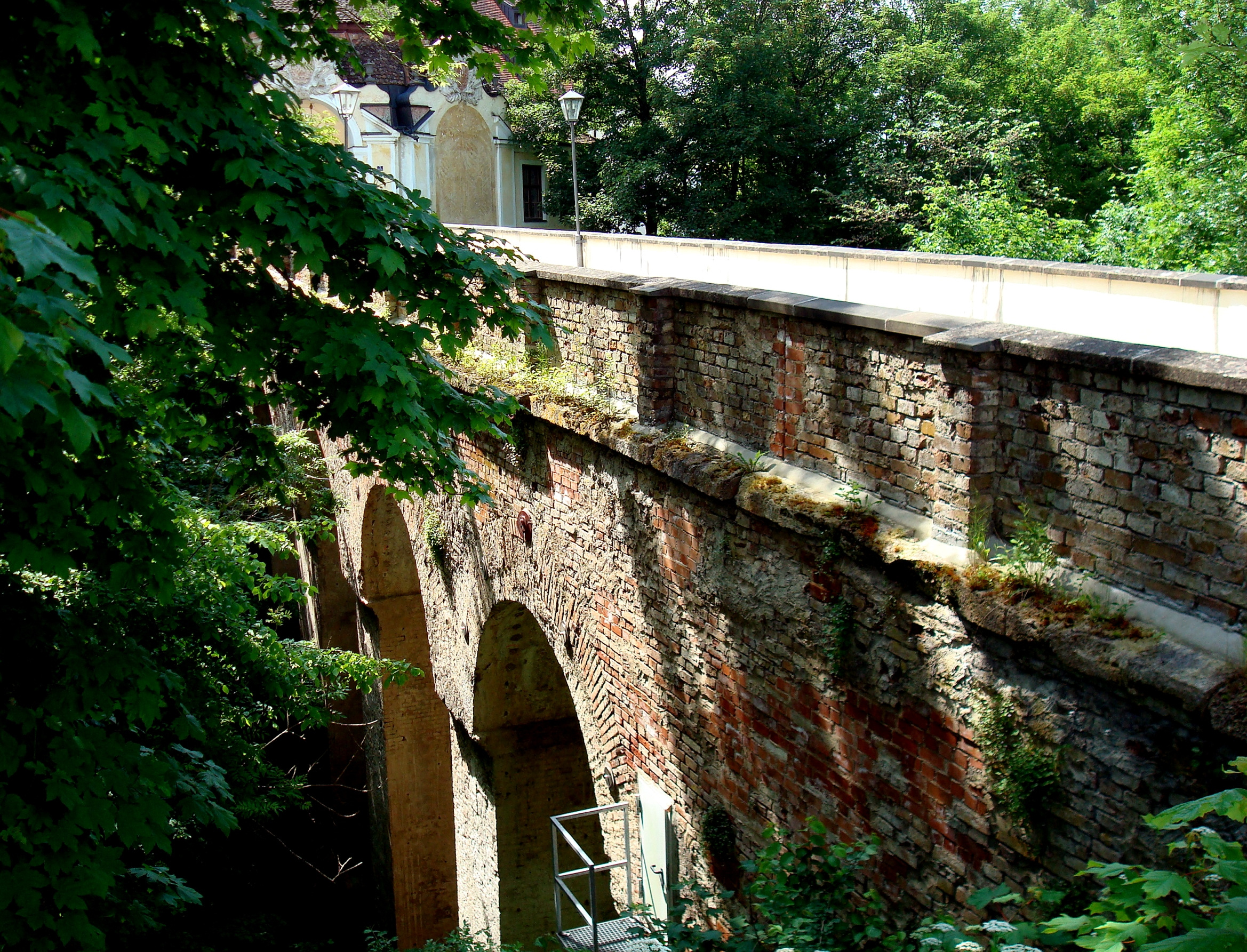
Bridge over the Höllgraben

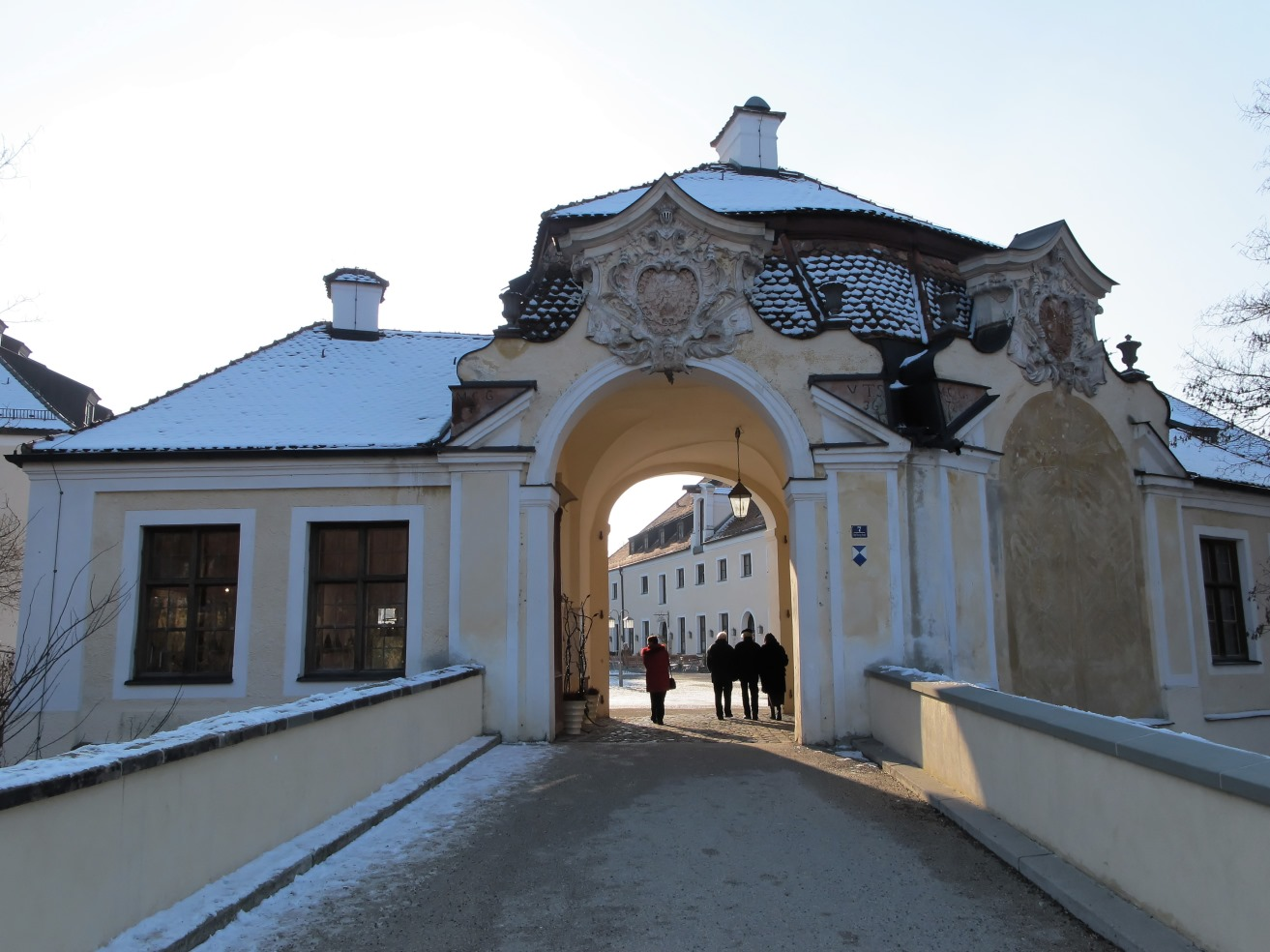
Baroque portal

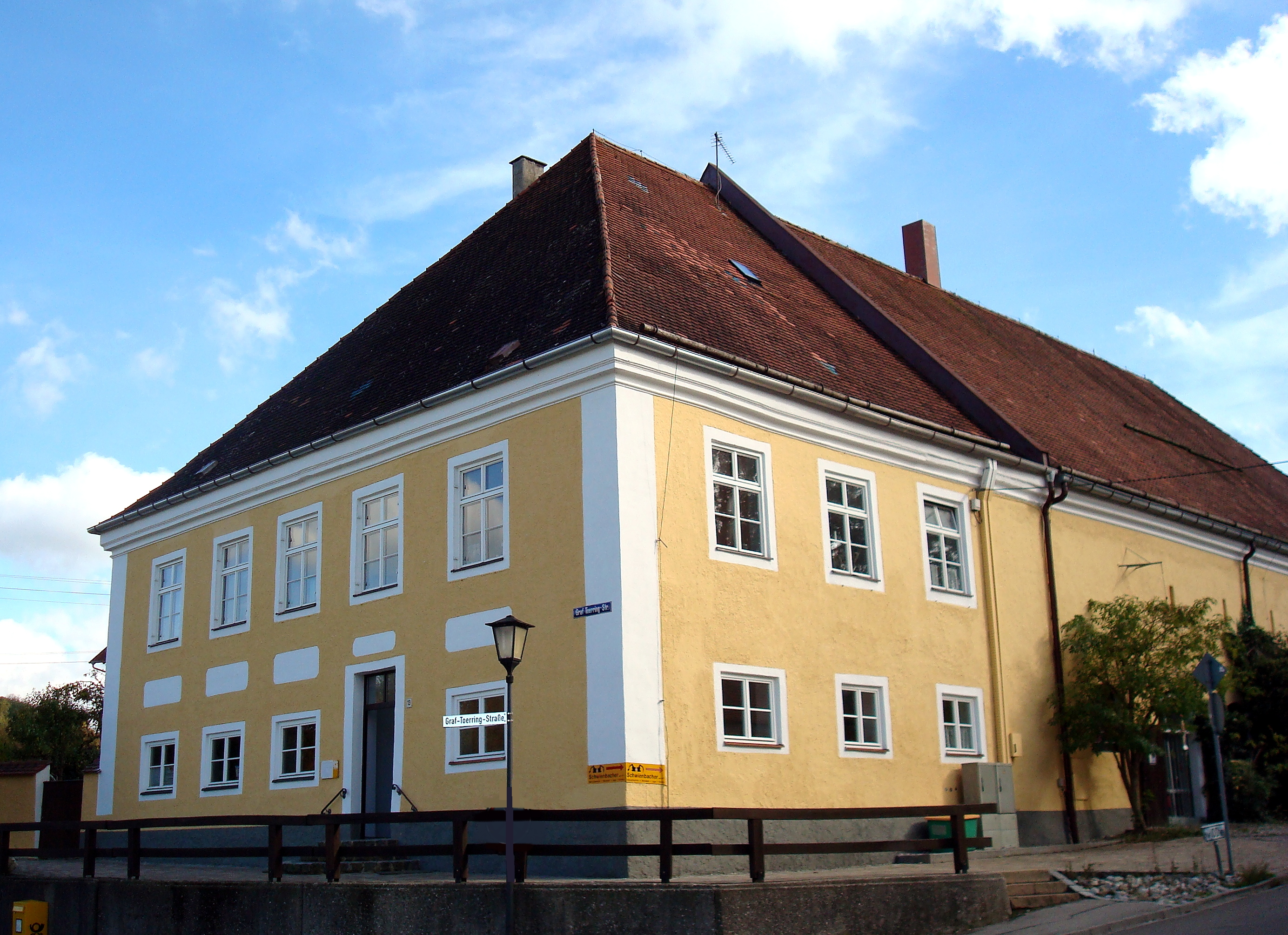
Outside farmyard

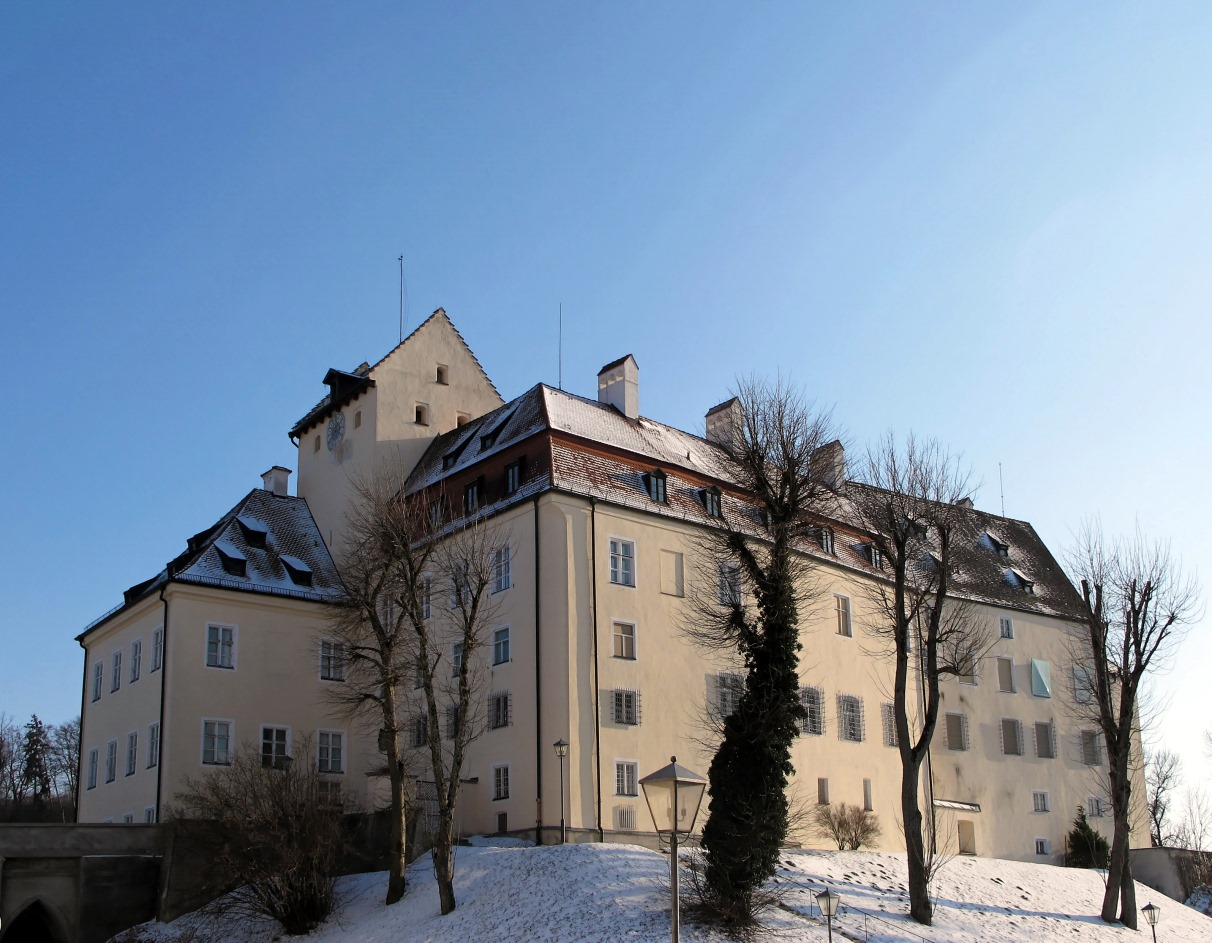
Castle

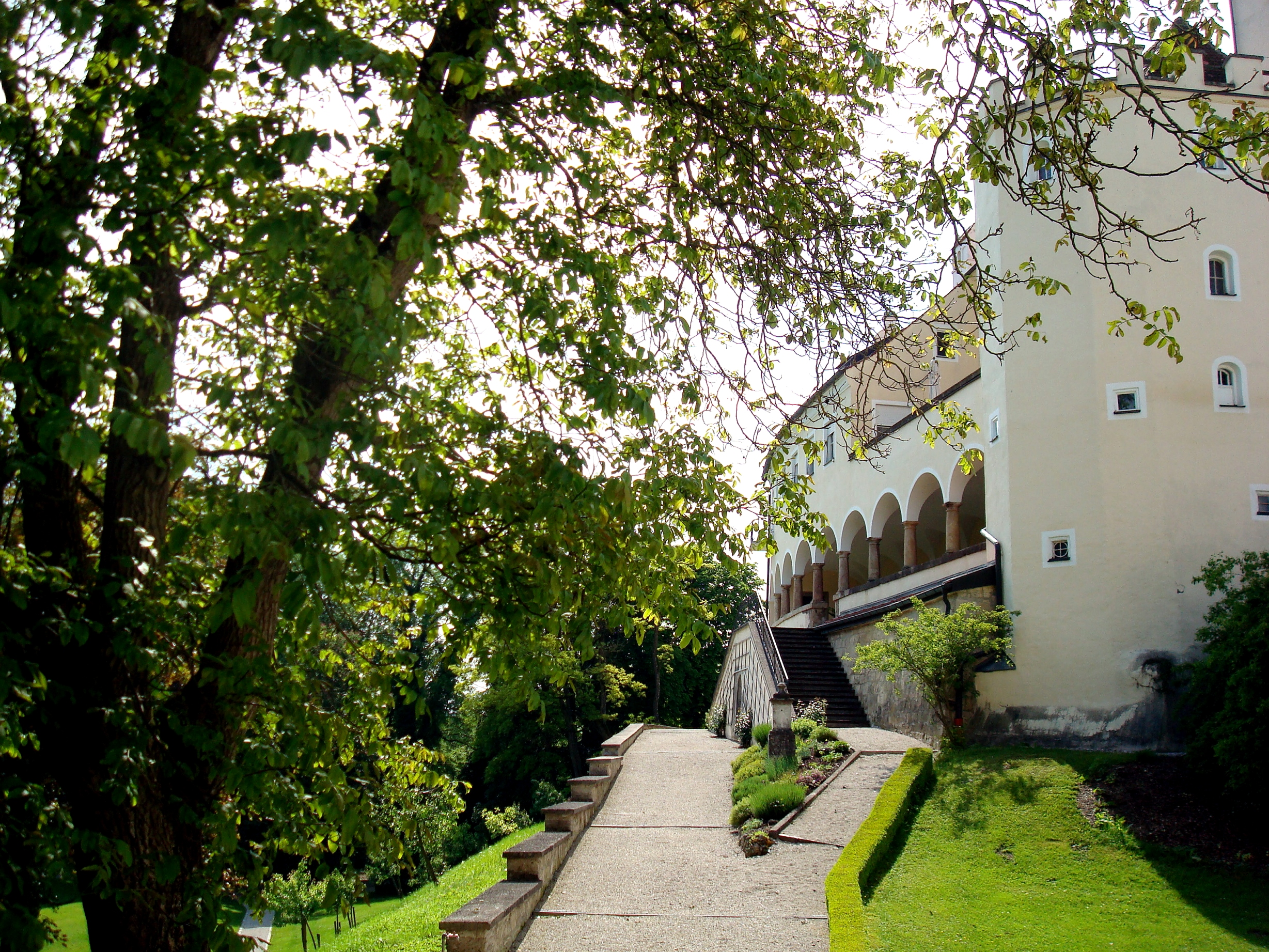
Castle in summer
