= Nicola Adamo =

Italian politician (born 1957)

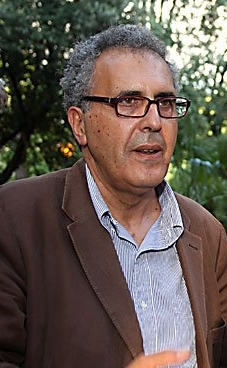

Nicola Adamo (born 31 July 1957, in Cosenza) is an Italian politician.

He was an Executive Councillor for Public Works in of Giunta Meduri, and in 2001 was also on the municipal council of Cosenza. He was elected regional secretary of the DS. He was a member of the Democrats of the Left until it was dissolved in 2007 after which he joined the Democratic Party. He was a Deputy of the 15th legislature for a few months.
