= Adamo Chiusole =

Italian painter

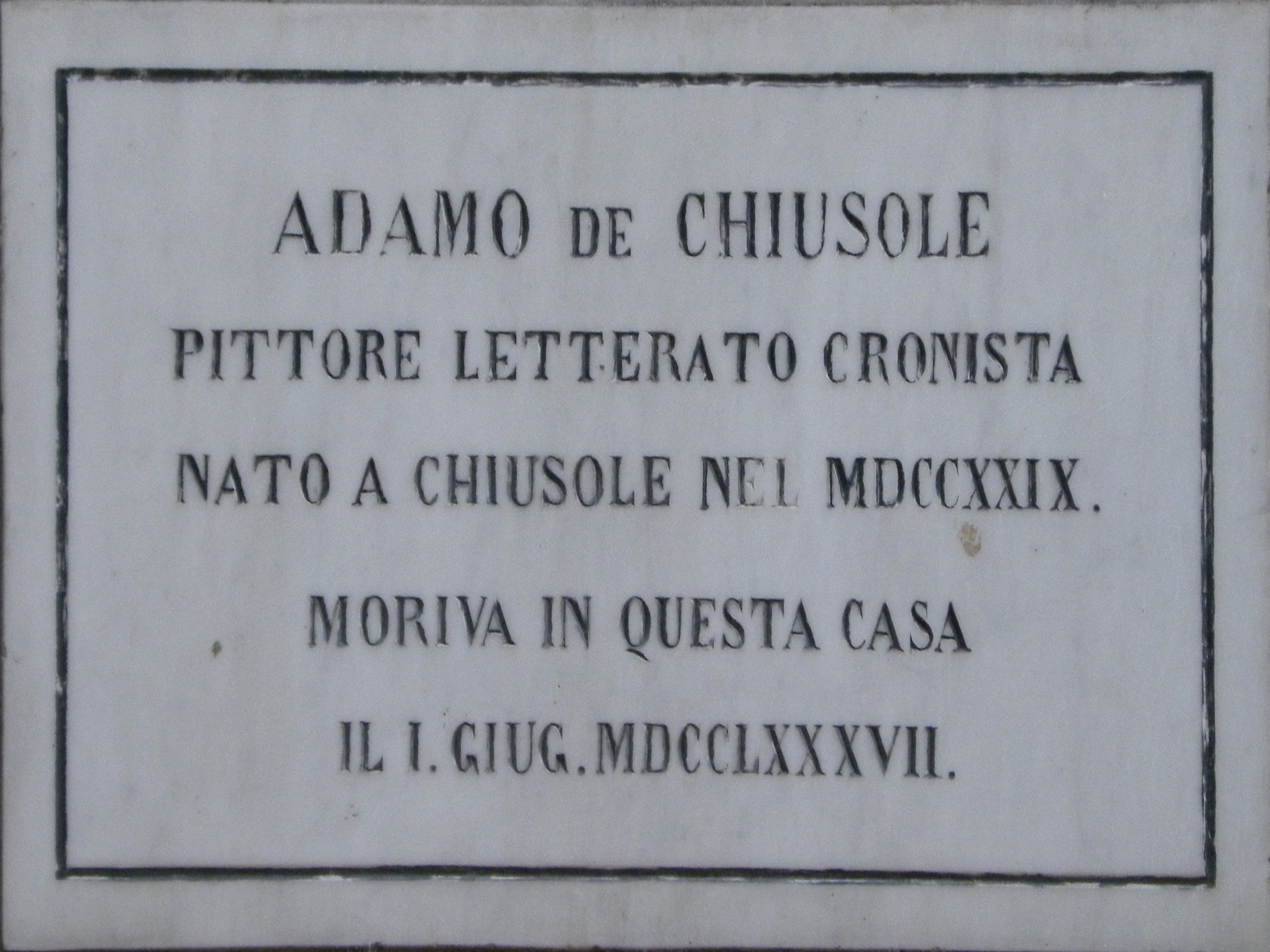

Count Adamo Chiusole (1728 - 1787) was an Italian painter and art historian. He mainly painted subjects with animals, landscapes and capricci.

== Biography ==
He was born in Chiusole, a neighborhood of Pomarolo in the Vallagarina, in the Province of Trentino, region of Trentino-Alto Adige/Südtirol. He studied first in Siena, then in Rome under Pompeo Battoni. In Rome, he resided in the Palazzo of the gran contestabile Lorenzo Colonna, his fellow pupil. He then gained the patronage of Cardinal Scipione Borghese. He was named Count of the Holy Palace and Knight of the Order of the Golden Spur by Pope Benedict XIV. Chiusole turned down and offer to be the inspector of the Royal Gallery of Berlin under Frederick the Great of Prussia. He did publish a book praising the King.

In addition, to painting, he was versatile as a writer of both prose and poetry. He is described as having a clear style but without energy. He is described as praising his own works, both written and painted, as better than his contemporaries.

== Literary works ==
- Componimenti pratici sopra la pittura trionfante (Siena, 1751)
- Il perfetto modello del valor militare raffigurato nella Maestà di Federico III Re di Prussia (Rovereto, 1778)
- Componimento drammatico in lode di Caterina II Imperatrice di tutte le Russie (Rovereto, 1784)
- Componimento per il felice arrivo ai suoi feudi del conte Cesare da Castelbarco
- Componimenti poetici per il tenente maresciallo Giancarlo Partini
- Componimento poetico per Benedetto XIV
- Le pitture, sculture ed. architetture più rare di Roma (Vicenza, 1782)
- Itinerario delle pitture, sculture ed architetturre più rare di molte città d Italia
- Della vita nobile e cavalleresca (Vicenza, 1782)
- Lettera ad un amico sopra il villaggio di Chiusole (Verona, 1785)
- Lettera ad un amico Sopra l'Onore
- Lettera Sopra il teatro delle piccole città;
- Notizie antiche e moderne della Valle Lagarina in supplement to the history of Rovereto by Tartarotti (Verona, 1785).
- Dell'arte pittorica: libri VIII. (1768).

His biography was noted by Clementino Vannetti (Commentariolum de Adamo Clusolo. Veronae, 1787).

He died in Rovereto.
