= Tiago Conceição =

Portuguese footballer (born 1989)

Personal information
- Full name: Tiago Alexandre Gonçalves da Conceição
- Date of birth: 17 April 1989 (age 37)
- Place of birth: Lisbon, Portugal
- Height: 1.86 m (6 ft 1 in)
- Position: Defender

Youth career
- 1999–2005: Sacavenense
- 2005–2006: Belenenses
- 2006–2007: Sacavenense
- 2007–2008: Belenenses

Senior career*
Years	Team	Apps	(Gls)
2008–2010	Estoril	16	(0)
2010–2011	Real Massamá	17	(1)
2011–2013	Doxa	39	(2)
Total		72	(3)
- * Club domestic league appearances and goals

Tiago Alexandre Gonçalves da Conceição (born 17 April 1989 in Lisbon) is a Portuguese retired footballer who played as both a central defender and a left back.
