= Demetris Economou =

Cypriot footballer (born 1992)

Personal information
- Full name: Demetrios Economou
- Date of birth: 10 November 1992 (age 34)
- Place of birth: Paralimni, Cyprus
- Position: Defender

Team information
- Current team: Achyronas Liopetriou
- Number: 22

Senior career*
Years	Team	Apps	(Gls)
2009–2012	Enosis Neon Paralimni	13	(0)
2012–2016	Anorthosis Famagusta	19	(0)
2016–2018	Enosis Neon Paralimni	11	(0)
2018	Ayia Napa	6	(0)
2019–	Achyronas Liopetriou	7	(1)

International career^{‡}
2010–2011	Cyprus U19	3	(0)
2012–2013	Cyprus U21	5	(0)
- * Club domestic league appearances and goals as of 23 February 2019 ‡ National team caps and goals as of 6 September 2013

Demetris Economou (Greek: Δημήτρης Οικονόμου; born 10 November 1992) is a Cypriot footballer who plays as a defender for Achyronas Liopetriou in the Cypriot Third Division.
