= Rui Duarte (footballer, born 1980) =

Portuguese footballer

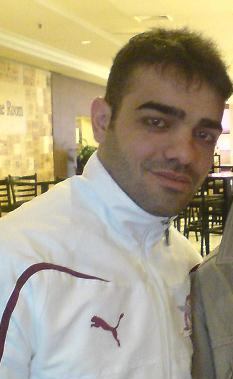
- Duarte with Rapid București in 2011

Personal information
- Full name: Rui Sandro de Carvalho Duarte
- Date of birth: 11 October 1980 (age 46)
- Place of birth: Lisbon, Portugal
- Height: 1.74 m (5 ft 8 1/2 in)
- Position: Right-back

Youth career
- 1991–1994: Sporting CP
- 1994–1995: Futebol Benfica
- 1995–1999: Sacavenense

Senior career*
Years	Team	Apps	(Gls)
1999–2000	Sacavenense		
2000–2002	Casa Pia	87	(5)
2003–2006	Estoril	84	(3)
2005–2006	→ Boavista (loan)	20	(0)
2006–2008	Estrela Amadora	47	(0)
2008–2010	Braşov	47	(0)
2010–2013	Rapid București	54	(1)
2013	Anorthosis	11	(0)
2014	1º Dezembro	9	(0)
Total		359	(9)
- * Club domestic league appearances and goals

Rui Sandro de Carvalho Duarte (born 11 October 1980 in Lisbon) is a Portuguese former professional footballer who played as a right-back.
