= Christine Adamo =

French writer (born 1965)

- Occupation: writer

Christine Adamo (born 1965) is a French writer who comes from the world of the sciences. Specialized in environmental information, she writes thrillers which cross science, history and suspense.

== Novels ==
- Requiem pour un poisson (Requiem for a fish) (Liana Levi and Folio policier – Gallimard (France), 2005, De Geus (Netherland), Effemme (Italy), Alpha Books (China)), tells how a Parisian girl, Marie, get caught into the deadly discovery of an enigmatic fossil fish: the cœlacanth,
- Noir austral (Southern black) (Liana Levi and Folio policier – Gallimard (France) (2006), De Geus (Netherland), Touring Editore (Italia)), develops two plots which come together in the end: the odyssey of an Aboriginal Australian tribe from 70,000 BCE to the present and the story of a young Australian woman, Liz, who moves to Provence in search of her French roots.
- Web mortem (Albin Michel (France), 2009), precipitates Hammond Mac Leod, a young and distinguished dean of the University of St Andrews, in Scotland, into an atrocious online game strangely linked to forgotten languages of ancient Mesopotamia.

== Award nominations ==
In 2005, Requiem pour un poisson was shortlisted for several awards, including the Prix du polar Européen, the Prix Carrefour and the Prix SNCF.

In 2006, Noir austral was shortlisted for several awards, including the Prix Michel Lebrun.
