= Pedro Almeida (footballer, born 1993) =

Portuguese footballer

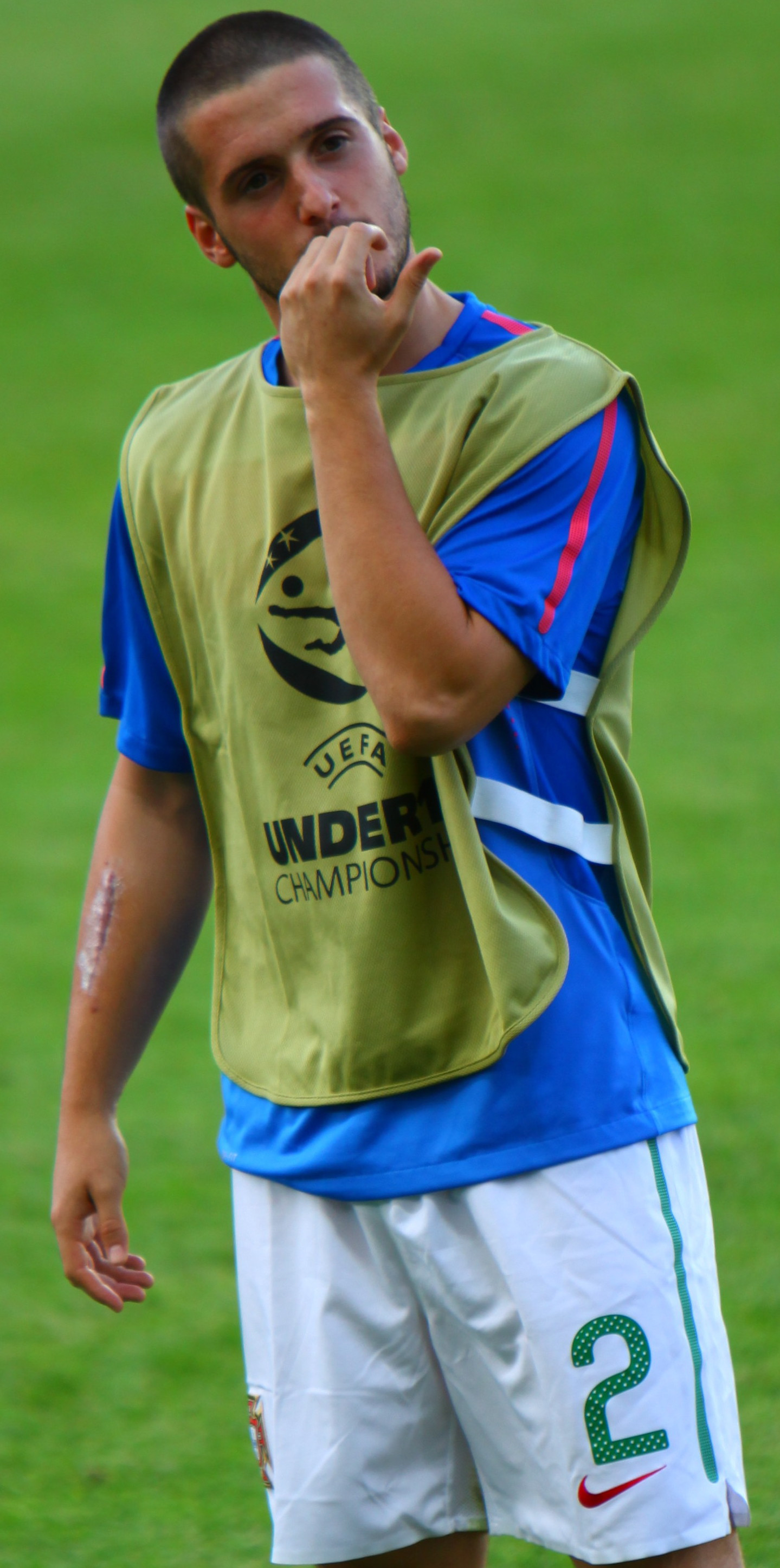

Personal information
- Full name: Pedro Miguel Baltazar Almeida
- Date of birth: 5 April 1993 (age 33)
- Place of birth: Porto Salvo, Portugal
- Height: 1.72 m (5 ft 8 in)
- Position: Right back

Team information
- Current team: Futebol Benfica

Youth career
- 2001–2011: Benfica
- 2011–2012: União Leiria

Senior career*
Years	Team	Apps	(Gls)
2012	União Leiria	3	(0)
2012–2013	Anorthosis	0	(0)
2013–2014	Torreense	25	(0)
2014–2016	Atlético	53	(0)
2016–2017	Mafra	26	(0)
2017–2018	Moura	26	(0)
2018–2019	Loures	2	(0)
2019–2020	Torreense	11	(0)
2020	Ponterrolense	3	(0)
2020–2021	Negrais	14	(0)
2021–	Futebol Benfica		

International career
2008–2009	Portugal U16	9	(0)
2009–2010	Portugal U17	16	(0)
2010–2011	Portugal U18	6	(0)
2011–2012	Portugal U19	11	(0)
2012–2013	Portugal U20	6	(0)
- * Club domestic league appearances and goals as of 1 August 2021

Pedro Miguel Baltazar Almeida (born 5 April 1993) is a Portuguese footballer who plays for C.F. Benfica as a right back.

== Club career ==
Born in Porto Salvo, Oeiras, Almeida played youth football with S.L. Benfica from 2001 to 2011. Subsequently, he joined U.D. Leiria for his last year as a junior.

Almeida made his Primeira Liga debut on 29 April 2012, being one of only eight players fielded by Leiria – immerse in a deep financial crisis – in a 0–4 home loss against C.D. Feirense.
