= Dell Adamo =

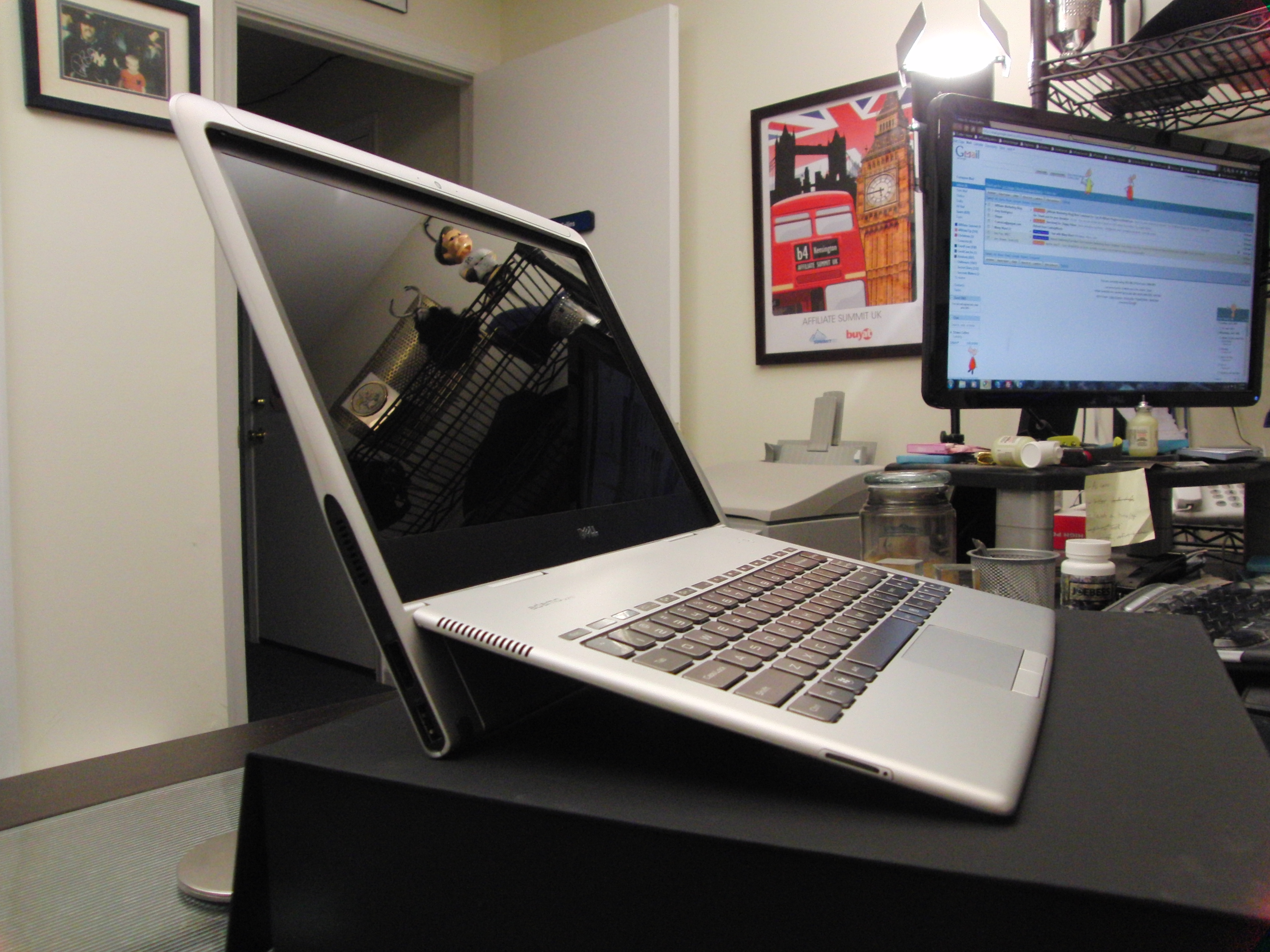
- Dell Adamo XPS
- Developer: Dell
- Manufacturer: Dell
- Type: Laptop/Notebook
- Released: 2009
- Introductory price: $1999 or $2699
- Discontinued: 2011
- CPU: Intel Core 2 Duo SU9300 @ 1.2 GHz or SU9400 @ 1.4 GHz or SL9600 @ 2.1 GHz
- Memory: 2 or 4 GB of DDR3 SDRAM @ 800 MHz
- Storage: 128 or 256 GB SSD
- Dimensions: 0.65 inches or 1.65 cm thick
- Weight: 1.84 kg (4.06 pounds)

Adamo (Italian for "To fall in love with") was a Dell slim luxury ultraportable subnotebook focused on design and mobility, intended to compete with Apple's MacBook Air laptop.

In 2008, Dell announced it as the "world's thinnest laptop" at 16.5 mm (0.65 inches) thick. A prototype was unveiled at the Consumer Electronics Show on January 9, 2009. The Adamo line was discontinued in 2011.

== Adamo 13 ==
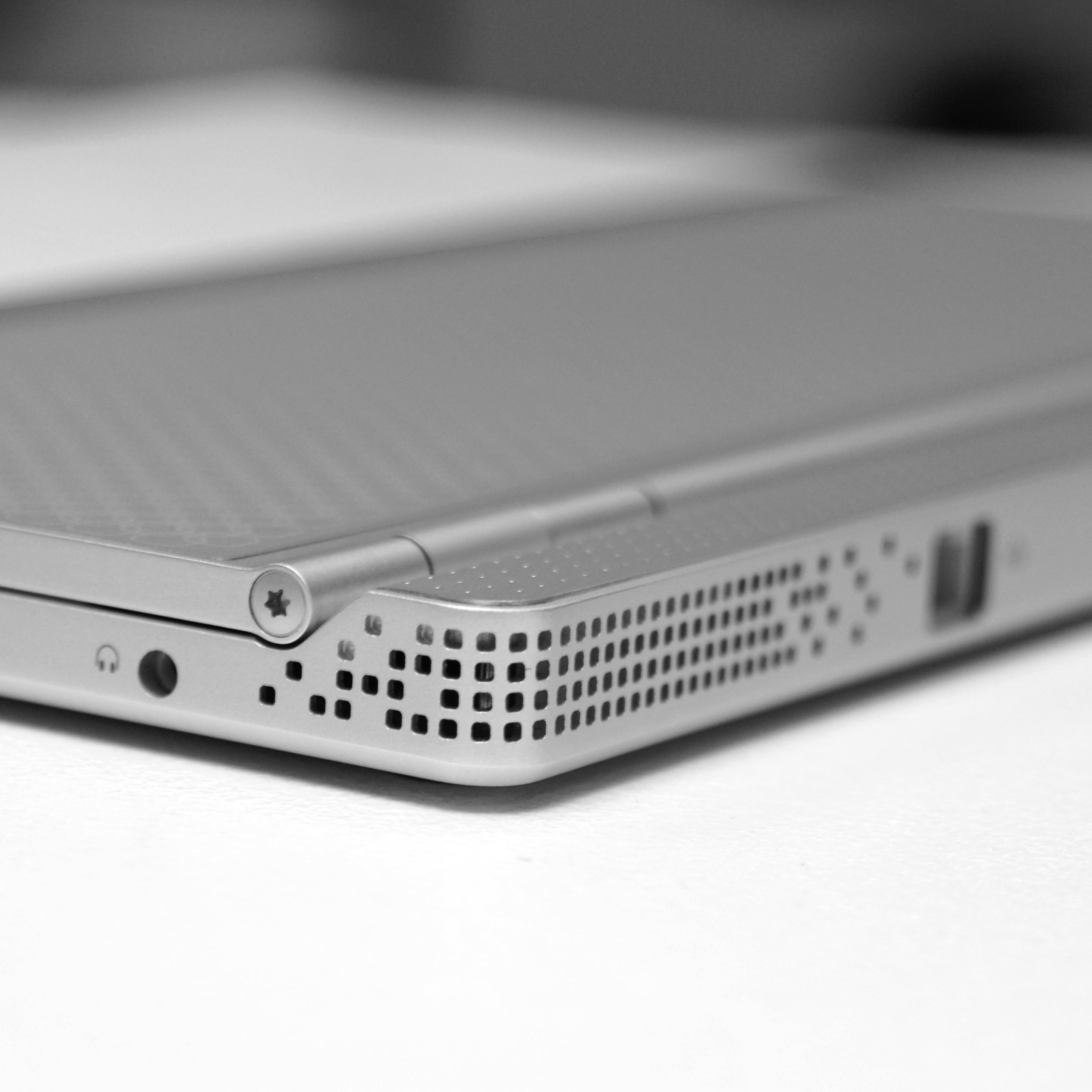
Hinge torx screw

The Adamo 13 was released on March 17, 2009, in the US with either a Core 2 Duo 1.2 GHz ULV processor, 2 GB DDR3 RAM (Admire model) or a Core 2 Duo 1.4 GHz ULV processor with 4 GB DDR3 RAM (Desire model). Both were initially equipped with a 128 GB solid-state drive, and a 13.4-inch widescreen with a 1366x768 resolution (16:9 ratio) with a built-in 1.3 MP webcam and microphone. It weighs 4 pounds, originally shipped with Windows Vista 64-bit Home Premium, with an optional external DVD-RW drive. Later in 2009, Dell upgraded the Desire model with a Core 2 Duo 2.1 SL9600 processor and a 256 GB solid-state drive. Adamo prices were also dropped by $500 at the time. The Adamo 13 was offered in two colors; Pearl (silver with white accents) and Onyx (black with black accents).

== Adamo XPS ==
On September 9, 2009, Dell previewed a thinner Adamo XPS laptop design, which was 9.99 mm (0.39 inches) thick. It was released on November 5, 2009 and priced at USD 1,799. The laptop's bottom half, containing the keyboard, is smaller than the top half of the laptop containing the screen. The screen half is concave, so when shut the keyboard embeds itself into the screen. It is designed, that when open, the bottom of the screen half and the edge of the keyboard, make contact with the surface on which it is resting. The Adamo XPS has a heat-sensing strip on the lip of its lid which, when touched, opens the lid. Internally, it has either a 128 GB solid-state drive or a 180 GB hard drive. It uses 4GB of DDR3 memory and a 1.4 GHz Intel ULV (ultra low voltage) processor. The battery can run either 4 or 5 hours, depending on configuration.

In March 2010, Dell discontinued the Adamo XPS line.
