= Christos Mastrou =

Cypriot footballer

Personal information
- Full name: Christos Mastrou
- Date of birth: January 3, 1988 (age 38)
- Place of birth: Dherynia, Cyprus
- Height: 1.83 m (6 ft 0 in)
- Position: Goalkeeper

Team information
- Current team: Anagennisi Deryneia

Youth career
- Anagennisi Dherynia

Senior career*
Years	Team	Apps	(Gls)
2009–2012	Anagennisi Deryneia	42	(0)
2012–2013	Anorthosis Famagusta	16	(0)
2013–2015	Enosis Neon Paralimni	26	(0)
2015–	Anagennisi Deryneia	49	(0)

International career^{‡}
2012–	Cyprus	2	(0)
- * Club domestic league appearances and goals as of January 26, 2013 ‡ National team caps and goals as of September 7, 2012

Christos Mastrou (Greek: Χρίστος Μάστρου; born January 3, 1988, in Cyprus) is a Cypriot football player, who plays as a goalkeeper who plays for Anagennisi Deryneia and the Cypriot National Team.

== Anorthosis Famagusta F.C. ==
On June 13, 2012, Mastrou transferred from Anagennisi to Anorthosis Famagusta F.C. for 80,000 euros. He was successful so Anorthosis released him on 21/08/2013. From that date he played for Enosis Neon Paralimni
