= Juliano Spadacio =

Brazilian footballer (born 1980)

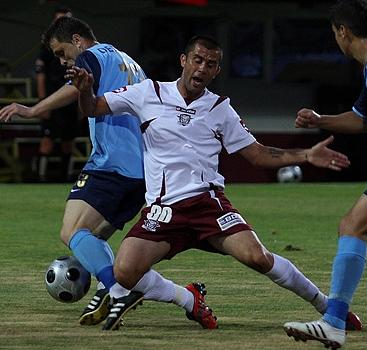

Personal information
- Full name: Juliano Gonçalves Spadacio
- Date of birth: 16 November 1980 (age 45)
- Place of birth: Dracena, Brazil
- Height: 1.80 m (5 ft 11 in)
- Position: Midfielder

Senior career*
Years	Team	Apps	(Gls)
1999–2000	XV de Novembro	0	(0)
2000–2002	União São João	0	(0)
2002	Ituano	0	(0)
2002–2003	Corinthians	13	(0)
2003–2004	→ União São João (loan)	0	(0)
2004	→ Austria Salzburg (loan)	15	(0)
2005	Paulista	0	(0)
2005	Paranaense	9	(0)
2005–2008	Nacional	70	(8)
2008–2011	Rapid București	93	(21)
2011	PAOK	7	(1)
2012	Astra Ploiești	14	(4)
2012–2013	Anorthosis Famagusta	28	(14)
2013–2015	Hapoel Acre	44	(7)
Total		293	(55)
- * Club domestic league appearances and goals as of November 29, 2015

Juliano Gonçalves Spadacio (born 16 November 1980) is a Brazilian retired footballer. In 2009–10, he was named Midfielder of the Year of the Romanian Liga I. Juliano on 6 September 2011, signed a two-year contract with the Greek club PAOK.
