= William Boaventura =

Brazilian footballer

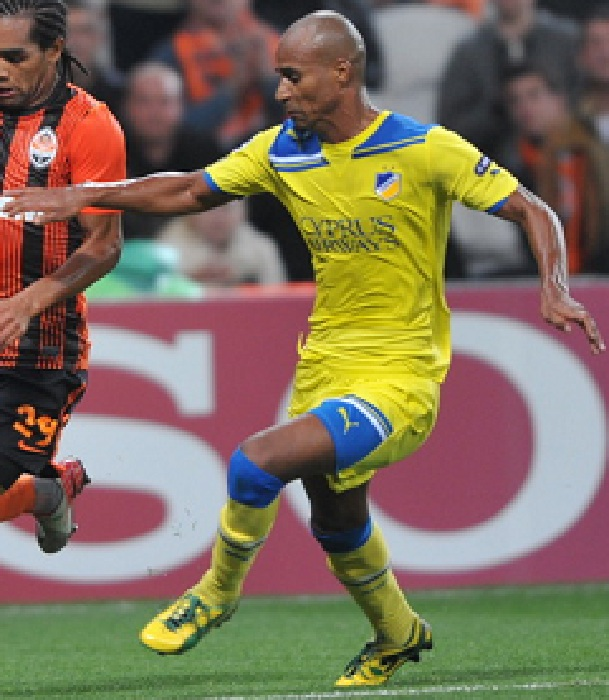

Personal information
- Full name: William Cleite Boaventura
- Date of birth: February 14, 1980 (age 46)
- Place of birth: Ipatinga (MG), Brazil
- Height: 1.82 m (6 ft 0 in)
- Positions: Left back; left midfielder

Senior career*
Years	Team	Apps	(Gls)
2002–2004	A. D. Cabofriense		
2004–2006	AEL Limassol	42	(14)
2006–2008	Anorthosis Famagusta	42	(5)
2008–2009	Metalurh Donetsk	18	(0)
2009	→ FC Kuban (loan)	25	(0)
2010	Metalurh Donetsk	13	(0)
2010–2012	APOEL	34	(4)
2012	Anorthosis Famagusta	3	(1)
- * Club domestic league appearances and goals as of 22 September 2012

William Cleite Boaventura (born February 14, 1980, in Brazil) is a retired Brazilian footballer.

== Career ==
"Boa" started his career in the Brazilian team Cabofriense and arrived in Cyprus the summer of 2004, showing good skills while playing for AEL Limassol. Two years later he moved to Anorthosis Famagusta, where he stayed for another two years. At Anorthosis he won the 2006–07 Cypriot Cup and the 2007–08 Cypriot First Division.

At the end of season 2007–2008 he left for Ukraine and Metalurh Donetsk. In 2009 Boa played in Russia's Kuban (on loan from Metalurh Donetsk) where he had 25 appearances and then returned in Metalurh.

On 17 June 2010, Boaventura returned to Cyprus and agreed for a two years contract with APOEL. At APOEL, Boaventura won his second championship title in his career, by helping the team to win the 2010–11 Cypriot First Division. The following season he appeared in seven official 2011–12 UEFA Champions League matches for APOEL, in the club's surprising run to the quarter-finals of the competition.

On 6 June 2012, he returned to Anorthosis Famagusta, signing a one-year contract with the club, but in September 2012, Boaventura forced to stop his career at 32 years old because he was treated heart problems.

== Honours ==
Anorthosis

- Cypriot First Division: 2007–08
- Cypriot Cup: 2006–07
- Cypriot Super Cup: 2007

APOEL

- Cypriot First Division: 2010–11
- Cypriot Super Cup: 2011
