= Adamos Andreou =

Cypriot football midfielder

Personal information
- Full name: Adamos Andreou
- Date of birth: 18 December 1994 (age 31)
- Place of birth: Larnaca, Cyprus
- Position: Attacking midfielder

Team information
- Current team: Digenis Akritas
- Number: 5

Youth career
- 2010–2011: Anorthosis Famagusta

Senior career*
| Years | Team | Apps | (Gls) |
| 2011–2017 | Anorthosis Famagusta | 13 | (0) |
| 2015–2016 | → Omonia Aradippou (loan) | 20 | (3) |
| 2017–2018 | Ethnikos Achna | 4 | (0) |
| 2019 | Digenis Oroklinis | 15 | (1) |
| 2019–2020 | Ayia Napa | 12 | (0) |
| 2020–2022 | Nea Salamina | 51 | (2) |
| 2022–2025 | Omonia 29M | 69 | (2) |
| 2025– | Digenis Akritas | 26 | (1) |

International career^{‡}
| 2010 | Cyprus U17 | 3 | (0) |
| 2012–2013 | Cyprus U19 | 6 | (0) |
| 2015 | Cyprus U19 | 6 | (0) |
- * Club domestic league appearances and goals as of 3 May 2026 ‡ National team caps and goals as of 4 September 2015

Adamos Andreou (Greek: Αδάμος Ανδρέου; born 18 December 1994 in Larnaca, Cyprus) is a Cypriot football midfielder who plays for Digenis Akritas.

== Career ==
=== Club career ===
Andreou made his debut for Anorthosis in a match against AEL Limassol.

Ahead of the 2019–20 season, Andreou joined Ayia Napa FC.
