= Seefeld, Bavaria =

Seefeld
- Municipality
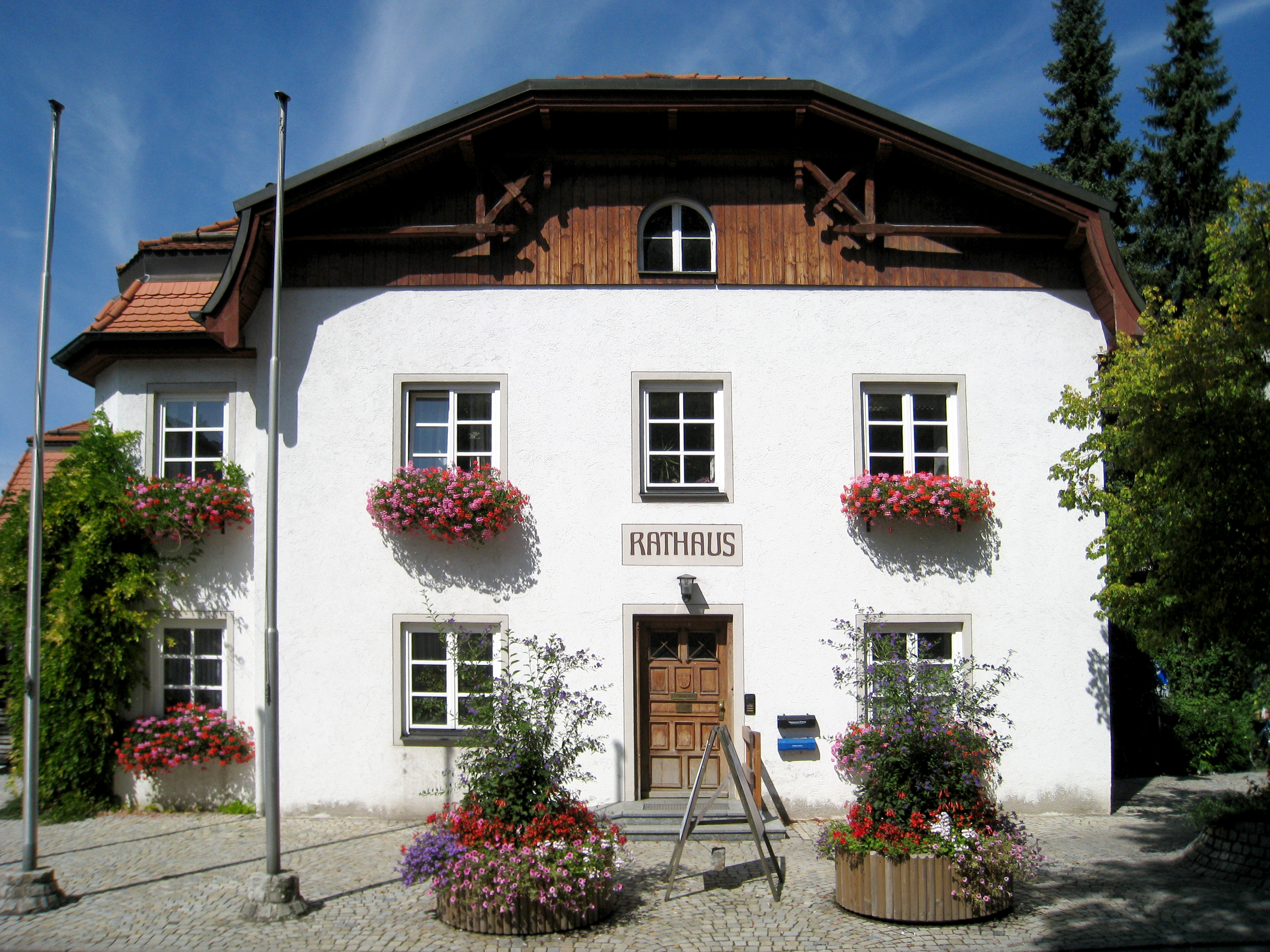
- The old town hall

- Coat of arms

- Location of Seefeld within Starnberg district
- Interactive map of Seefeld
- Location within Germany Location within Bavaria
- Coordinates: 48°2′N 11°12′E
- Country: Germany
- State: Bavaria
- Admin. region: Oberbayern
- District: Starnberg

Government
  - Mayor (2020–26): Klaus Kögel (CSU)

Area
  - Total: 34.85 km^{2} (13.46 sq mi)
- Elevation: 570 m (1,870 ft)

Population (2025-12-31)
  - Total: 7,660
  - Density: 220/km^{2} (569/sq mi)
- Time zone: UTC+01:00 (CET)
  - Summer (DST): UTC+02:00 (CEST)
- Postal codes: 82229
- Dialling codes: 08152
- Vehicle registration: STA
- Website: www.seefeld.de

Seefeld (German pronunciation: [ˈzeːfɛlt]) is a municipality in the district of Starnberg in Bavaria, Germany. The town lies on the western shore of the Pilsensee ("Pilsen Lake"). It is connected to the Bavarian capital city of Munich by the S-Bahn line S8. Seefeld is notable for the Seefeld Castle (c. 1302), a seat of the Toering noble family of Bavaria.
