= Paulo Jorge (footballer, born 1980) =

Portuguese footballer

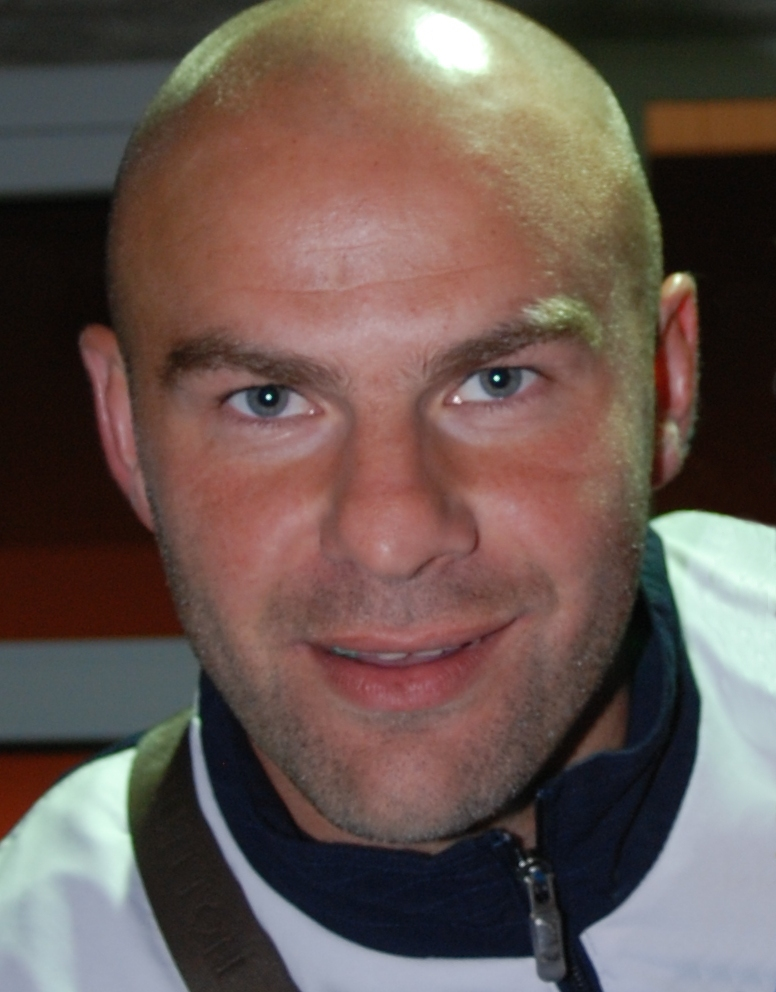

Personal information
- Full name: Paulo Jorge Soares Gomes
- Date of birth: 16 June 1980 (age 46)
- Place of birth: Braga, Portugal
- Height: 1.86 m (6 ft 1 in)
- Position: Centre-back

Team information
- Current team: Braga B (assistant)

Youth career
- 1992–1999: Braga

Senior career*
Years	Team	Apps	(Gls)
1999–2004	Braga B	95	(11)
2002–2009	Braga	135	(9)
2009–2012	APOEL	46	(4)
2012–2014	Anorthosis	45	(2)
2014–2015	Doxa	14	(1)
Total		335	(27)

Managerial career
- 2018: APOEL (assistant)
- 2018–: Braga B (assistant)
- * Club domestic league appearances and goals

Paulo Jorge Soares Gomes (born 16 June 1980), known as Paulo Jorge, is a Portuguese retired professional footballer who played as a central defender, currently assistant manager of Braga B.

He played until the age of 29 with Braga, appearing in 166 official matches over seven Primeira Liga seasons. He finished his 16-year senior career in Cyprus.

== Club career ==
Born in Braga, Paulo Jorge played for hometown club S.C. Braga for the vast majority of his career, which he began as a professional in the 2002–03 season. From his early Primeira Liga debut, he was awarded team captaincy.

Although a defensive player, Paulo Jorge scored five league goals in 2006–07 to help the team finish fourth, as well as two in the UEFA Cup against A.C. ChievoVerona and Tottenham Hotspur. In 2008–09, he was absent for the vast majority of the matches due to several surgeries to repair a foot ailment; his return only took place on 1 May 2009 against Rio Ave FC (0–0), and it was the sole appearance he made during the campaign.

On 10 June 2009, the board of APOEL FC announced the signing of Paulo Jorge on a two-year deal. In his first year, he won the Cypriot Super Cup and took part in three group stage games in their first participation in the UEFA Champions League.

On 12 May 2011, after helping APOEL win the national championship, the 31-year-old Paulo Jorge renewed his contract for another year. The following campaign, he featured in nine Champions League matches in the side's surprising run to the quarter-finals.

On 13 May 2012, Paulo Jorge signed a two-year contract with another team in the country, Anorthosis Famagusta FC. He retired at the age of 35, after one season with Doxa Katokopias FC.

Paulo Jorge returned to APOEL on 22 March 2018, as assistant manager under compatriot Bruno Baltazar.

== Career statistics ==
Club	Season	League			National Cup		League Cup		Continental		Other		Total	
Club	Season	Division	Apps	Goals	Apps	Goals	Apps	Goals	Apps	Goals	Apps	Goals	Apps	Goals
Braga	2002–03	Primeira Liga	24	1	2	0	—		—		—		26	1
Braga	2003–04	Primeira Liga	26	1	1	0	—		—		—		27	1
Braga	2004–05	Primeira Liga	13	1	1	1	—		2	0	—		16	2
Braga	2005–06	Primeira Liga	20	1	2	0	—		2	0	—		24	1
Braga	2006–07	Primeira Liga	24	5	3	0	—		9	2	—		36	7
Braga	2007–08	Primeira Liga	27	0	1	0	1	0	7	0	—		36	0
Braga	2008–09	Primeira Liga	1	0	0	0	0	0	0	0	—		1	0
Braga	Total		135	9	10	1	1	0	20	2	—		166	12
APOEL	2009–10	Cypriot First Division	13	1	0	0	—		6	0	1	0	20	1
APOEL	2010–11	Cypriot First Division	15	2	0	0	—		5	1	—		20	3
APOEL	2011–12	Cypriot First Division	18	1	1	0	—		14	0	—		33	1
APOEL	Total		46	4	1	0	—		25	1	1	0	73	5
Anorthosis	2012–13	Cypriot First Division	19	0	3	0	—		4	0	—		26	0
Anorthosis	2013–14	Cypriot First Division	26	2	2	0	—		2	0	—		30	2
Anorthosis	Total		45	2	5	0	—		6	0	—		56	2
Doxa	2014–15	Cypriot First Division	14	1	0	0	—		—		—		14	1
Career total			240	16	16	1	1	0	51	3	1	0	309	20

== Honours ==
APOEL

- Cypriot First Division: 2010–11
- Cypriot Super Cup: 2009, 2011
