= Massimo Busacca =

Swiss football referee

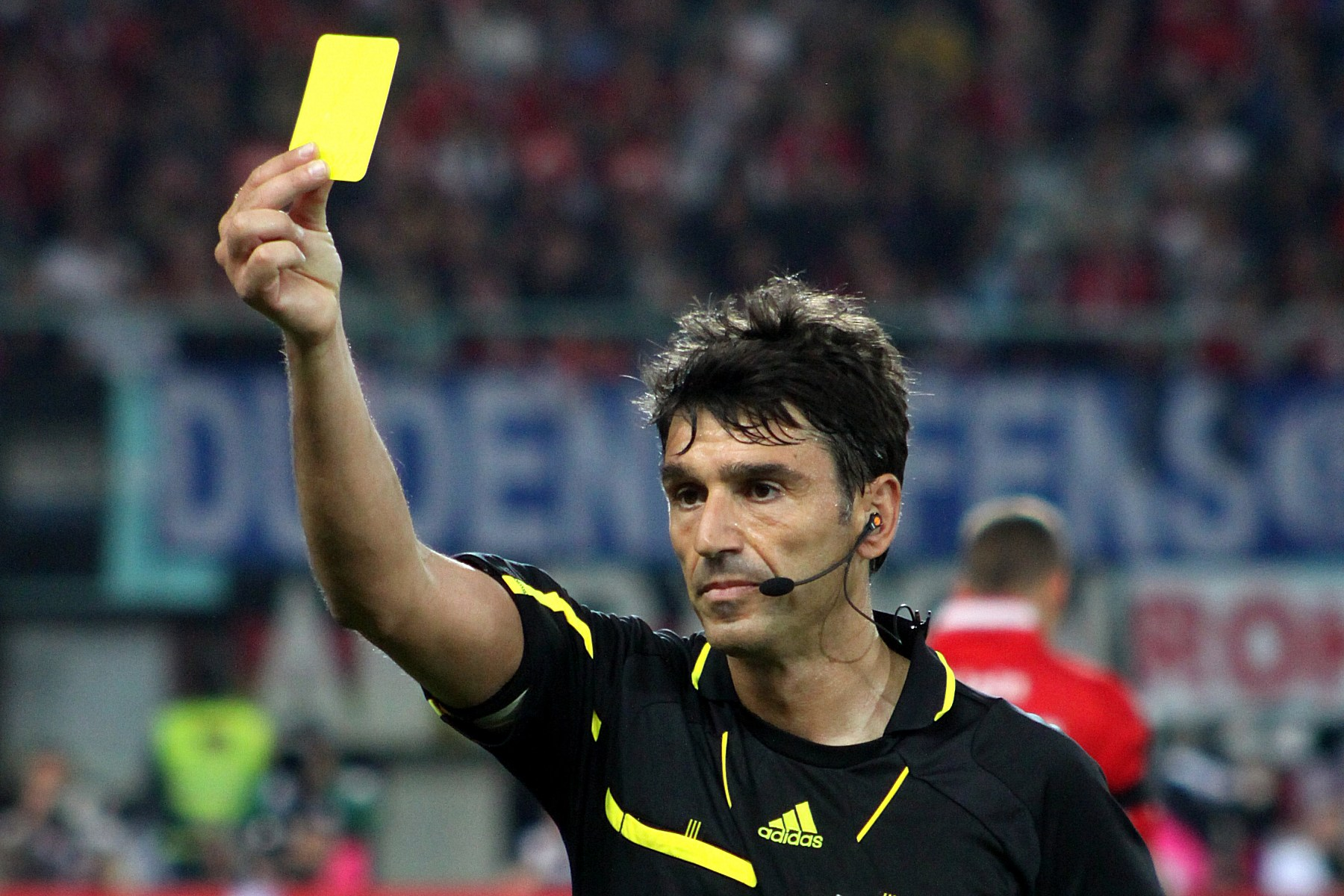
- Born: 6 February 1969 (age 57); Bellinzona, Switzerland
- Other occupation: Head of Refereeing Development with FIFA

Domestic
Years	League	Role
1996–2011	Swiss Super League	Referee

International
Years	League	Role
1999–2011	FIFA listed	Referee

Massimo Busacca (born 6 February 1969) is a Swiss former football referee, who is FIFA Director of Refereeing, overseeing the protection of football's core values and the continuous improvement of the game through the development of match officials and referee coaches. He lives in Monte Carasso, Ticino, Switzerland, near Bellinzona.

== Early life ==
Busacca was born in Bellinzona, Switzerland, to Italian parents from Sicily. Busacca used to play football in a lower division in Ticino. After a successful career as a top referee he became Head of FIFA Refereeing in July 2011.

== Career ==
=== Club ===
Busacca was a Swiss Super League Referee from 1996 to 2011 and a FIFA referee from 1999 to 2011.

In 2006, Busacca refereed the Swiss championship-deciding match at St. Jakob-Park, between FC Basel and FC Zurich that resulted in the 2006 Basel Hooligan Incident.

Busacca took charge of the 2007 UEFA Cup Final at Hampden Park on 16 May, one of the biggest appointments for a UEFA referee. In the 68th minute Busacca sent off RCD Espanyol midfielder Moisés Hurtado for a second bookable offence during the match. Sevilla won the match 3–1 on penalties following a 2–2 draw.

Busacca was selected to referee the UEFA Champions League Final at the Stadio Olimpico in Rome on 27 May 2009 between FC Barcelona and Manchester United; Barcelona won the match 2–0.

On 19 September 2009, Busacca was the referee in a Swiss Cup match between FC Baden and BSC Young Boys. After crowd trouble disrupted the game after home side Baden took an unlikely lead, Busacca raised his middle finger to the crowd. Busacca had initially denied making the obscene gesture but was handed a three-match ban by the Swiss Football Association and was forced to issue an apology.

Busacca was appointed as the referee for the 2010 UEFA Super Cup final in Monaco on 27 August; Atlético Madrid defeated Inter Milan 2–0.

On 8 March 2011, Busacca was the referee in a UEFA Champions League 2010–11 Round of 16 match between Arsenal F.C. and FC Barcelona, controversially sending Robin Van Persie off for kicking the ball after the whistle.

=== International ===
==== 2006 FIFA World Cup ====
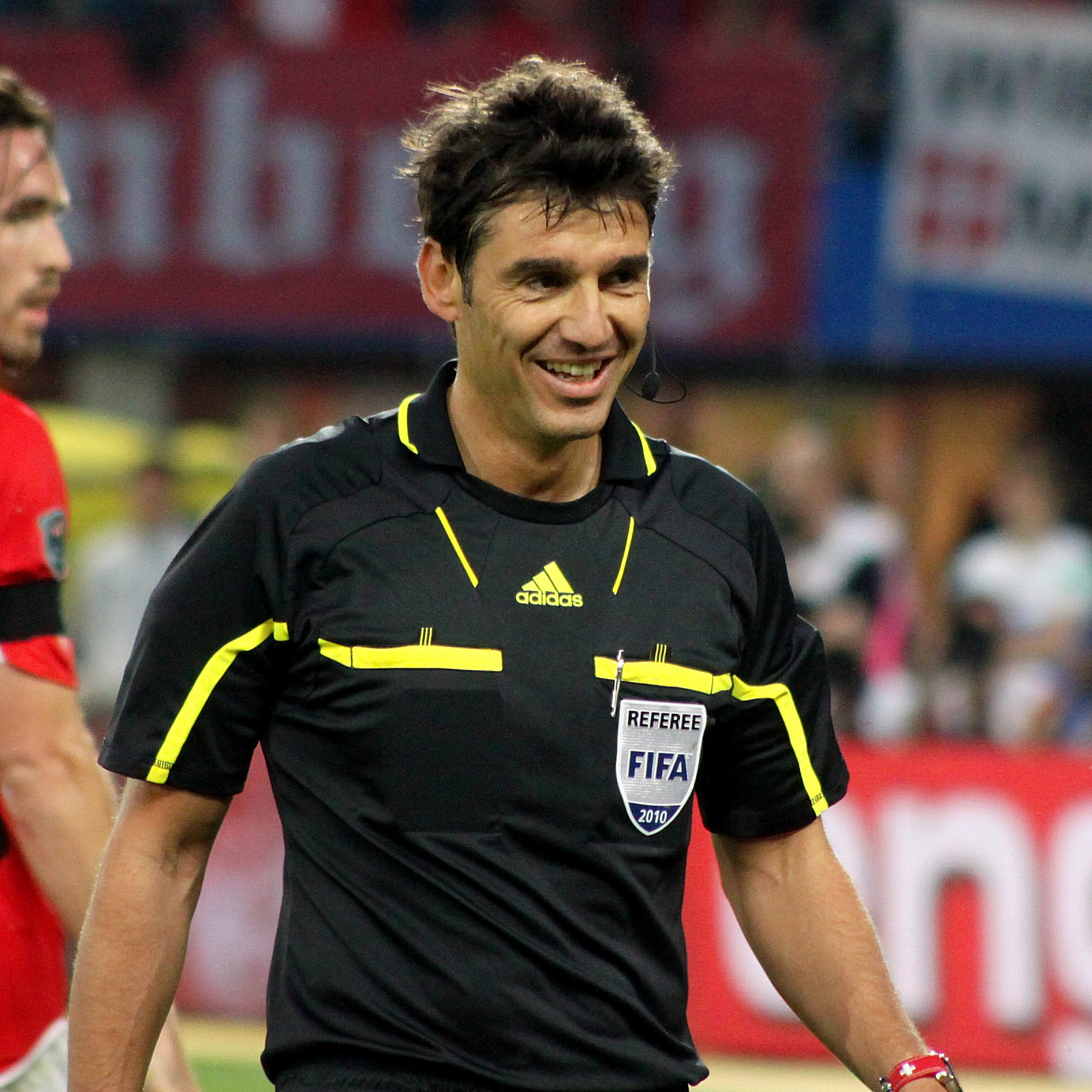
Busacca in 2011

Busacca was chosen to be a referee at the 2006 FIFA World Cup in Germany.

He refereed three games throughout the tournament:

- 14 June 2006 (group stage): Spain vs. Ukraine 4–0
- 20 June 2006 (group stage): Sweden vs. England 2–2
- 24 June 2006 (round of 16) : Argentina vs. Mexico 2–1. ET.

==== UEFA Euro 2008 ====
Busacca was selected to referee at the UEFA Euro 2008 tournament in Austria and Switzerland.

At the tournament, Busacca was the referee for the Group C game between Netherlands and Romania, the Group D game between Greece and Sweden and the semi-final match between Germany and Turkey.

==== 2009 FIFA Confederations Cup ====
Busacca was chosen as a referee for the 2009 FIFA Confederations Cup, refereeing the 2009 FIFA Confederations Cup semi-final game between hosts South Africa and eventual champions Brazil on 25 June 2009 in Johannesburg; Brazil went on to win the match 1–0.

==== 2010 FIFA World Cup ====
He was selected as a referee for the 2010 FIFA World Cup and refereed the Group A match between hosts South Africa and Uruguay.

He awarded a penalty and showed a red card to the South African goalkeeper, Itumeleng Khune, in the 77th minute, for tripping the Uruguay striker, Luis Suárez. South Africa went on to lose the game 3–0, and Khune became just the second goalkeeper to be sent off in World Cup history.

== Refereeing statistics ==
- 245 games in the Swiss Super League.
- 42 UEFA Champions League games, 45 UEFA Cup games.
- FIFA World Cup in Germany 2006 and South Africa 2010.
- Euro 2008 in Switzerland and Austria.
- 2009 FIFA Confederations Cup in South Africa.

== Notable matches refereed ==
Date	Match	Tournament	Venue	Result	Ref
16 May 2007	Sevilla vs. Espanyol Barcelona	2007 UEFA Cup final	Hampden Park, Glasgow	2–2 (3–1 on penalties)	
27 May 2009	Barcelona vs. Manchester United	2009 UEFA Champions League final	Stadio Olimpico, Rome	2–0	
27 August 2010	Inter Milan vs. Atlético Madrid	2010 UEFA Super Cup final	Stade Louis II, Monaco	0–2	

== Honours and achievements ==
- IFFHS World's Best Referee: 2009

== Retirement and subsequent ventures ==
It was announced on 14 July 2011 that Busacca had taken up the position of Head of Refereeing Development with FIFA, retiring from active refereeing duties in the process. Busacca has overseen refereeing matters at the 2014, 2018 and 2022 editions of the FIFA World Cup, as well as at the 2015, 2019 and 2023 versions of the Women's World Cup. He currently serves as FIFA Director Refereeing and as such, he has promoted the development of refereeing on a worldwide basis, including the use of technology and the promotion of female referees who now officiate at the highest level of the game.

== Personal life ==
Busacca is a devout Catholic and was crowned Switzerland's non-smoker of the year in 2006.

Preceded by 2006 (Germany) Herbert Fandel	UEFA Cup Final referee 2007 (Switzerland) Massimo Busacca	Succeeded by 2008 (Sweden) Peter Fröjdfeldt
Preceded by 2008 (Slovakia) Ľuboš Micheľ	UEFA Champions League Final referee 2009 (Switzerland) Massimo Busacca	Succeeded by 2010 (England) Howard Webb
