= 2009 UEFA Champions League final =

Football match in Rome, Italy

- Match programme cover
- Event: 2008–09 UEFA Champions League
Barcelona	Manchester United
(Spain)	(England)
2	0
- Date: 27 May 2009
- Venue: Stadio Olimpico, Rome
- UEFA Man of the Match: Xavi (Barcelona)
- Fans' Man of the Match: Lionel Messi (Barcelona)
- Referee: Massimo Busacca (Switzerland)
- Attendance: 62,467
- Weather: Clear night 23 °C (73 °F); 71% humidity

The 2009 UEFA Champions League final was played on 27 May 2009 at the Stadio Olimpico in Rome, Italy. The match determined the winners of the 2008–09 season of the UEFA Champions League, a tournament for the top football clubs in Europe. The match was won by Barcelona of Spain, who beat England's Manchester United 2–0. Samuel Eto'o opened the scoring in the 10th minute, and Lionel Messi added another goal 20 minutes from the end to earn Barcelona a historic treble of La Liga, the Copa del Rey and the Champions League, a feat never before achieved by a Spanish club. This was the only UEFA Champions League final where Lionel Messi and Cristiano Ronaldo have met, as well as the last match Ronaldo played for Manchester United until his return to the club in 2021. The match was refereed by Swiss referee Massimo Busacca.

This was Barcelona's third victory in the competition, 17 years after their first European Cup win in 1992. Manchester United went into the match as the competition's defending champions, the first title holders to reach the final since Juventus in 1997. Manchester United also sought to be the first team to retain the European Cup since the Milan win in 1990. It was the fifth consecutive year that the final involved at least one English team. The Stadio Olimpico had hosted three previous Champions League finals, in 1977, 1984 and 1996.

Prequalified as the winners of the 2008–09 Champions League, Barcelona played 2008–09 UEFA Cup winners Shakhtar Donetsk in the 2009 UEFA Super Cup, and they represented UEFA at the 2009 FIFA Club World Cup. For winning the final, Barcelona won €7 million in prize money, and Manchester United received €4 million as runners-up.

== Background ==
Barcelona and Manchester United had previously faced each other nine times in European competitions: three times in the UEFA Cup Winners' Cup and six times in the UEFA Champions League. Of those nine matches, Manchester United had recorded three wins to Barcelona's two, with the remaining four matches finishing in draws. The only time that the two teams met in a final came in 1991, when they contested the 1991 Cup Winners' Cup final. The first meeting between the two sides came in the third round of the 1983–84 Cup Winners' Cup; Barcelona won the first leg at the Camp Nou 2–0, but Manchester United won the return leg 3–0 at Old Trafford to reach the semi-finals. That result marked Manchester United's biggest win over Barcelona; Barcelona's biggest win was a 4–0 home victory in the group stage of the 1994–95 Champions League. The most recent meeting between the teams came in the semi-finals of the 2007–08 Champions League, when United held Barcelona to a 0–0 draw at the Camp Nou before beating them 1–0 at Old Trafford. Despite their record against Manchester United, Barcelona had an overall winning record against English clubs, having won 20 and lost 15 of their 52 matches against English opposition. Manchester United, on the other hand, had a losing record against Spanish teams; they had lost 11 and won 10 of their 37 matches.

Both teams had won the UEFA Champions League before; Manchester United had three titles, while Barcelona had two. The most recent of these had come only the season before, when Manchester United beat Chelsea on penalties in the Luzhniki Stadium in Moscow. They won the first of their European Cups in 1968, beating Benfica 4–1 at Wembley Stadium, while their second was achieved in 1999 with a 2–1 win over Bayern Munich at Barcelona's home ground, the Camp Nou, in which they overturned a 1–0 Bayern lead with two goals in second-half injury time. Barcelona's first European Cup was won as recently as 1992, when they beat Sampdoria 1–0 after extra time at Wembley; their only other title came in 2006 with a 2–1 win over another English side, Arsenal. Prior to 2009, unlike Barcelona, Manchester United had never lost a European Cup final; Barcelona had lost three – in 1961, 1986 and 1994, to Benfica, Steaua București and Milan respectively.

Both teams went into the match as the champions of their respective countries – the first time that the final had been contested by domestic champions since 1999 – both winning with games to spare. Manchester United won their 11th Premier League title with a 0–0 draw at home to Arsenal on 16 May, while Barcelona were confirmed as La Liga champions for the first time in three years when Real Madrid lost to Villarreal on the same day. Both Manchester United and Barcelona were also looking for another Champions League title to cap a season in which they had won multiple trophies: Manchester United had already won four out of a possible seven trophies in 2008–09 and were playing for the possibility of becoming the third team to retain the European double (the domestic league and the European Cup) and win a treble along with the Football League Cup, while Barcelona were aiming to become the first Spanish club to win the continental treble of La Liga, the Copa del Rey and the UEFA Champions League. United also entered the final on a 25-match undefeated streak in the Champions League, a then-competition record.

== Venue ==
The Stadio Olimpico in Rome was selected as the venue for the 2009 UEFA Champions League final at a meeting of the UEFA Executive Committee in Ljubljana, Slovenia, on 4 October 2006. The committee – who decided the venue for the 2008 final and the 2008 and 2009 UEFA Cup finals at the same meeting – based their decision on a number of factors, including stadium capacity, safety and security facilities, and accessibility.

The Stadio Olimpico had hosted three European Cup finals before 2009: the 1977 and 1984 finals, both of which were won by Liverpool – Liverpool beat Borussia Mönchengladbach 3–1 in 1977 before beating home side Roma 4–2 on penalties after the match finished 1–1 after extra time; the most recent final to be held at the Stadio Olimpico was the 1996 final, which Juventus also won 4–2 on penalties after a 1–1 draw with Ajax.

The construction of the stadium was commissioned by Italian dictator Benito Mussolini in the mid-1930s as the centrepiece of a new sports complex in the city, to be named Foro Mussolini. After World War II, the complex was renamed Foro Italico and the stadium was radically redesigned as a 54,000-capacity arena for the 1960 Summer Olympics. After hosting the 1987 World Athletics Championships, the stadium was redeveloped in time for the 1990 FIFA World Cup, at which West Germany's 1–0 win over Argentina in the final was played there. The stadium's most recent renovation, in 2008, brought the capacity to 72,689.

== Route to the final ==
(Spain) Barcelona				Round	(England) Manchester United			
Opponent	Agg.	1st leg	2nd leg	Qualifying phase	Opponent	Agg.	1st leg	2nd leg
(Poland) Wisła Kraków	4–1	4–0 (H)	0–1 (A)	Third qualifying round	Bye			
Opponent	Result			Group stage	Opponent	Result		
(Portugal) Sporting CP	3–1 (H)			Matchday 1	(Spain) Villarreal	0–0 (H)		
(Ukraine) Shakhtar Donetsk	2–1 (A)			Matchday 2	(Denmark) AaB	3–0 (A)		
(Switzerland) Basel	5–0 (A)			Matchday 3	(Scotland) Celtic	3–0 (H)		
(Switzerland) Basel	1–1 (H)			Matchday 4	(Scotland) Celtic	1–1 (A)		
(Portugal) Sporting CP	5–2 (A)			Matchday 5	(Spain) Villarreal	0–0 (A)		
(Ukraine) Shakhtar Donetsk	2–3 (H)			Matchday 6	(Denmark) AaB	2–2 (H)		
Group C winner: Pos / Team / Pld / Pts; 1 / (Spain) Barcelona / 6 / 13; 2 / (Portugal) Sporting CP / 6 / 12; 3 / (Ukraine) Shakhtar Donetsk / 6 / 9; 4 / (Switzerland) Basel / 6 / 1; Source: RSSSF				Final standings	Group E winner: Pos / Team / Pld / Pts; 1 / (England) Manchester United / 6 / 10; 2 / (Spain) Villarreal / 6 / 9; 3 / (Denmark) AaB / 6 / 6; 4 / (Scotland) Celtic / 6 / 5; Source: RSSSF			
Opponent	Agg.	1st leg	2nd leg	Knockout phase	Opponent	Agg.	1st leg	2nd leg
(France) Lyon	6–3	1–1 (A)	5–2 (H)	First knockout round	(Italy) Inter Milan	2–0	0–0 (A)	2–0 (H)
(Germany) Bayern Munich	5–1	4–0 (H)	1–1 (A)	Quarter-finals	(Portugal) Porto	3–2	2–2 (H)	1–0 (A)
(England) Chelsea	1–1 (a)	0–0 (H)	1–1 (A)	Semi-finals	(England) Arsenal	4–1	1–0 (H)	3–1 (A)

=== Barcelona ===
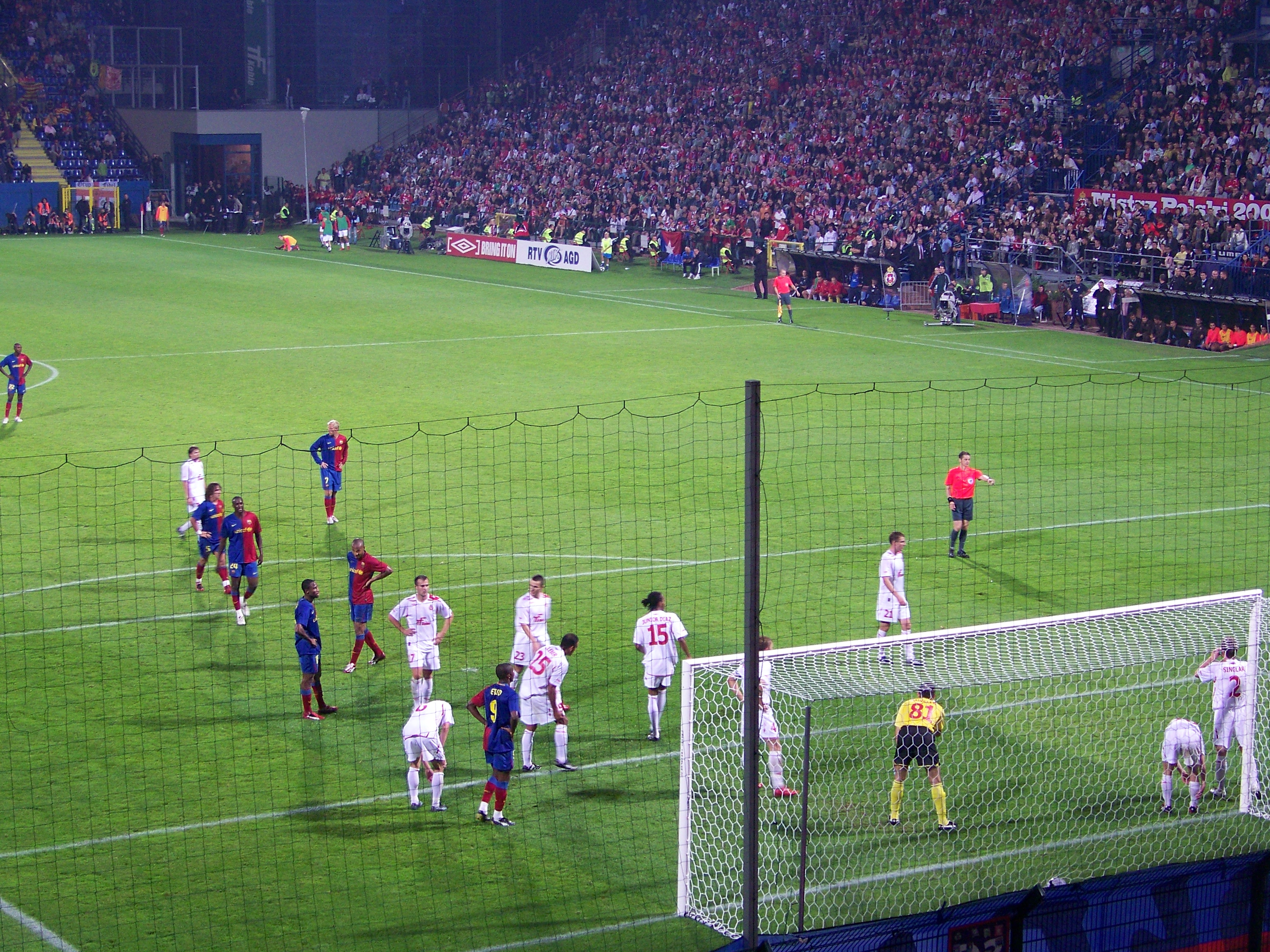
Barcelona's players prepare to attack a corner in the second leg of their third qualifying round tie against Wisła Kraków.

By virtue of their third-place finish in the 2007–08 La Liga, Barcelona entered the 2008–09 Champions League at the third qualifying round. Based on their UEFA coefficient, Barcelona were seeded for the third qualifying round draw, and drawn against Polish champions Wisła Kraków. A 4–0 win in the first leg at the Camp Nou made defeat in the second leg immaterial and Barcelona were entered into the group stage draw.

Barcelona's UEFA coefficient placed them in the top eight seeds for the draw, meaning that they would avoid having to play against Inter Milan, Liverpool, Chelsea or holders and their semi-final opponents from 2007 to 2008, Manchester United. However, they could still draw Bayern Munich, Roma or Juventus. In the end, Barcelona were drawn into Group C against Sporting CP, Basel and Shakhtar Donetsk.

Four wins and a draw at home to Basel placed Barcelona on top of their group with a game to spare, and despite defeat to Shakhtar Donetsk on Matchday 6, they still had the third-best record among the qualifiers for the first knockout round. As group winners, Barcelona would avoid being drawn with other group winners, including Manchester United, Liverpool, Juventus and Bayern Munich, but they could still be drawn against runners-up such as Chelsea, Inter and Arsenal. The draw eventually paired them with Lyon and, as group winners, they would play the second leg at home.

In the first leg in Lyon, Barcelona fell behind to a seventh-minute free kick from Juninho, only for Thierry Henry to equalise halfway through the second half, giving Barcelona an away goal to take back to the Camp Nou. They needed a win or a no-score draw to guarantee passage, but a 4–1 half-time lead set the stage for a convincing 5–2 win. Two first-half goals from Henry and one each from Lionel Messi and Samuel Eto'o were followed by goals from Jean Makoun and Juninho either side of the interval to reduce Lyon's deficit. However, a goal from Seydou Keita in the fifth minute of injury time secured a 6–3 aggregate win and passage to the next round.

In the quarter-finals, Barcelona were drawn against their fellow leading-scorers in the competition, Bayern Munich, who had beaten Barcelona's group stage opposition, Sporting CP, 12–1 on aggregate in the previous round. However, despite Bayern's impressive scoring record, goals from Messi and Eto'o gave Barcelona a 2–0 lead within the first 12 minutes. Messi and Henry also scored to seal a 4–0 home victory before half-time. The lack of an away goal meant Bayern Munich would have to win by five clear goals to qualify for the semi-finals. After a goalless first half, they took the lead through Franck Ribéry in the 47th minute, but it was not enough for Bayern as Keita equalised in the 73rd minute to clinch a 5–1 aggregate win for the Spanish side.

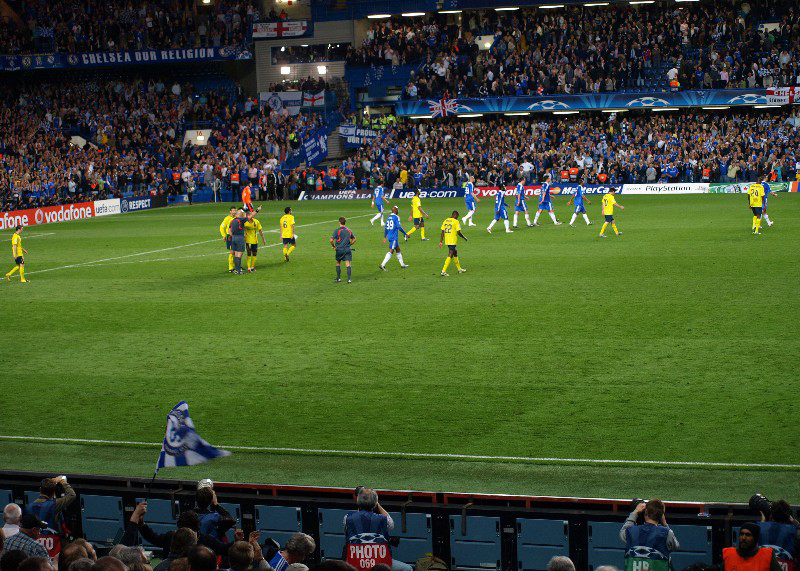
Barcelona take on Chelsea at Stamford Bridge in the semi-final second leg.

The quarter-final draw also determined the teams' routes to the final, with Barcelona facing the prospect of meeting either Chelsea or Liverpool in the semi-finals. After a 3–1 win at Anfield, Chelsea qualified for the semi-finals with a 4–4 draw at Stamford Bridge. The semi-final first leg was played at the Camp Nou; although Barcelona enjoyed the majority of the possession, Chelsea's defence was resolute and they became the first side to keep a clean sheet in Barcelona in this season's competition, coming away with a goalless draw. Barcelona needed to avoid defeat to reach the final, but they found themselves a goal down within 10 minutes; after they failed to clear Frank Lampard's pass into the penalty area, Michael Essien fired a left-footed volley past Víctor Valdés into the roof of the net. The rest of the match continued much the same as the first leg, with Barcelona retaining most of the possession. Despite this, they found themselves guilty of several fouls, while Chelsea made four unsuccessful penalty appeals during the match. Meanwhile, Dani Alves received his third yellow card of the knockout phase, ruling him out of Barcelona's next match, and Eric Abidal was given a straight red card for a foul on Nicolas Anelka as the French forward was through on goal. However, television replays after the incident showed that there was little contact between Abidal and Anelka. Norwegian referee Tom Henning Øvrebø allowed a minimum of four minutes of injury time at the end of the second half; in the third of those four minutes – just when it looked like Chelsea were about to secure a repeat of the 2008 final – Messi played the ball across the edge of the penalty area to Andrés Iniesta, who shot just past Petr Čech's outstretched hand for the away goal that would send Barcelona to the final.

=== Manchester United ===
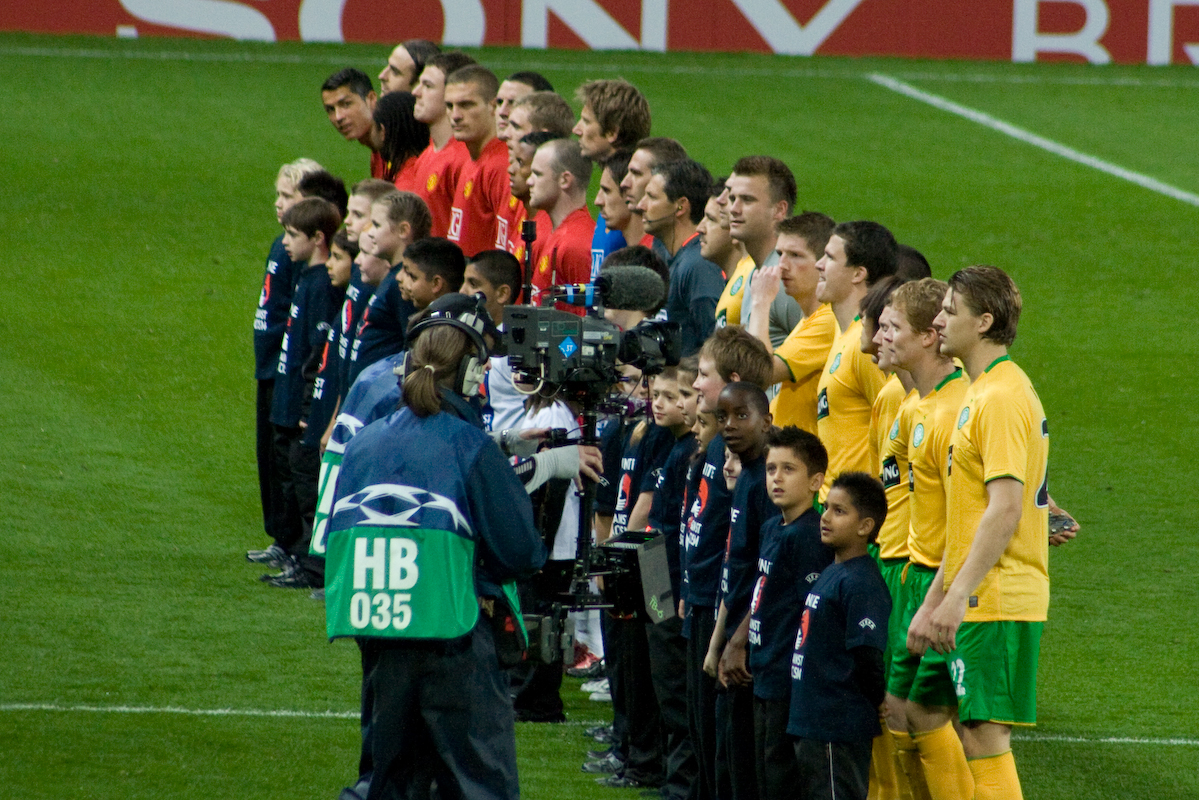
Manchester United and Celtic line up prior to their Group E match at Old Trafford on 21 October 2008.

As the reigning champions of the UEFA Champions League, Manchester United began their title defence at the group stage, for which they were given the top seed. This position among the top eight European clubs meant that they would avoid drawing former European champions Barcelona, Inter and Real Madrid until at least the first knockout round, although they were faced with the prospect of drawing Bayern Munich or Roma. Nevertheless, United ended up being drawn into Group E with two teams they had played against before: Villarreal (whom they had drawn in 2005–06) and Celtic (2006–07); and one they had not: AaB.

Two victories – away to AaB and at home to Celtic – and four draws were enough to secure passage to the knockout phase of the competition. Following a Celtic victory over Villarreal in the final group match, United went through as group winners. This meant that they would avoid Roma, Barcelona, Bayern Munich, Porto and Juventus in the first knockout round; however, their potential opposition still included Inter, Lyon and Real Madrid. The draw paired Manchester United with José Mourinho's Inter, but since United had won their group, they were rewarded by having the second leg at home.

United started the first leg the better of the two sides, and although Inter improved in the second half, neither side was able to find the net during the match, and United took a 0–0 draw back to Old Trafford. The draw was also United's 20th match since their last defeat in the UEFA Champions League, breaking Ajax's 19-match record that had stood for 13 years. The lack of an away goal at the San Siro meant that United could not afford to concede a goal in the event of a draw. A fourth-minute headed goal from Nemanja Vidić, however, got the home side off to a good start, and Cristiano Ronaldo doubled United's lead four minutes into the second half. Shots from both Zlatan Ibrahimović and Adriano hit the frame of the Manchester United goal in either half of the match, but they were unable to find the back of the net, and the 2–0 result sent the English champions through to the next stage of the competition.

The draw for the quarter-finals paired United with Porto, against whom they had played in the first knockout round of the 2003–04 competition. The draw also determined the semi-final pairings, with United or Porto drawn to play against Arsenal or Villarreal. The first leg of the quarter-final was played at Old Trafford, giving Porto the chance to put the pressure on Manchester United with an away goal. That away goal came in the fourth minute of the game, but Wayne Rooney equalised 10 minutes later and Carlos Tevez gave United the lead in the 85th minute. However, with only one minute left in the game, United suffered a defensive lapse, allowing Mariano González to score Porto's second away goal. Those away goals meant that United travelled to the Estádio do Dragão in Porto needing a win or a score-draw of 2–2 or higher to remain in the competition. A 40-yard goal from Ronaldo in the sixth minute put United into the lead, and although both sides pressed for another goal, it proved to be the only one of the game, making Manchester United the first English side to win in Porto.

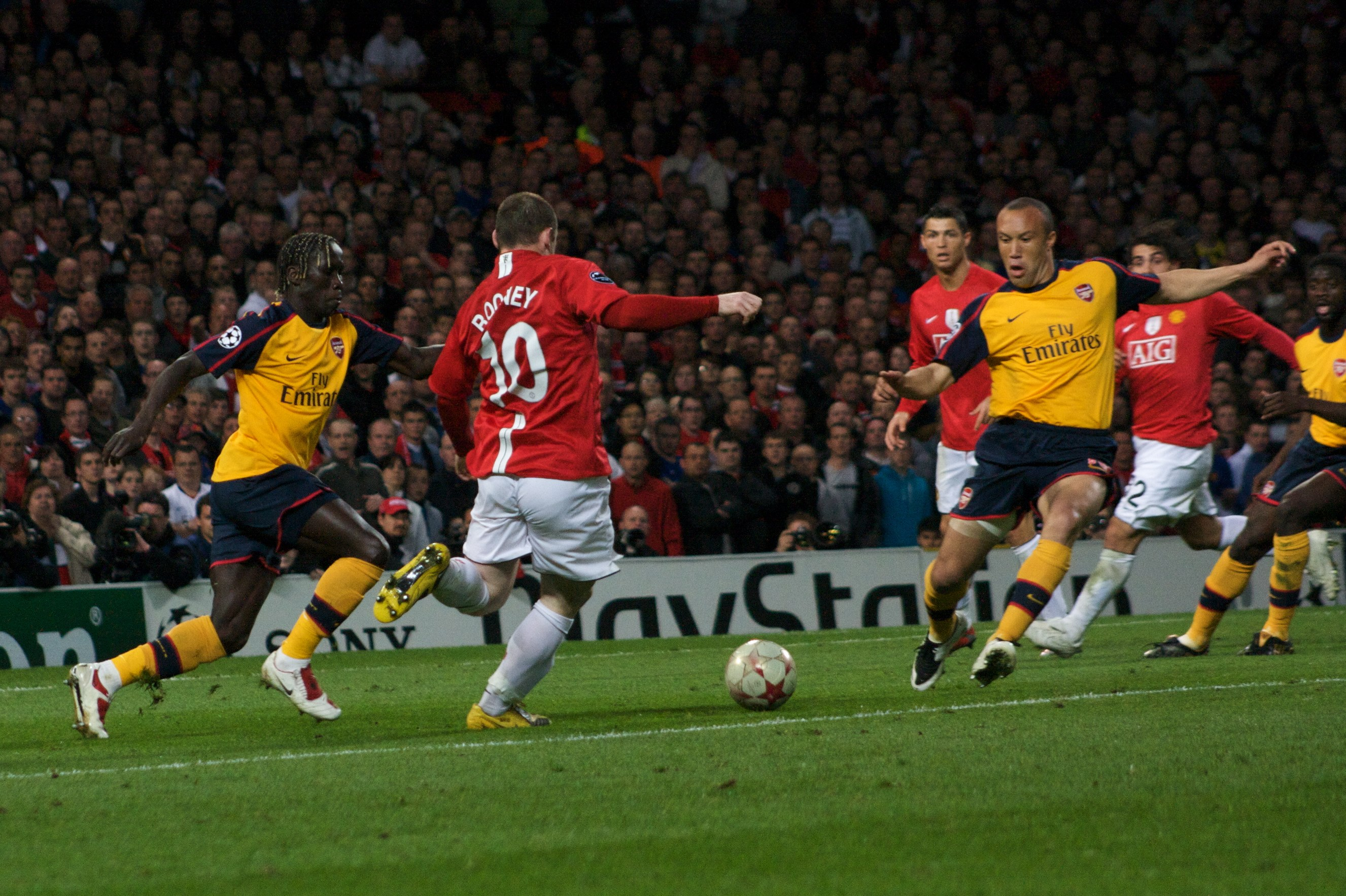
Wayne Rooney and Mikaël Silvestre compete for the ball during the semi-final first leg between Manchester United and Arsenal.

Meanwhile, a 1–1 draw in Villarreal and a 3–0 win at the Emirates Stadium secured Arsenal's status as United's semi-final opponents. The draw had determined that United would play the first leg at home, and after Rooney, Tevez and Ronaldo had early chances, John O'Shea opened the scoring, firing home a Michael Carrick cross after Arsenal had failed to clear a corner. United continued to make chances throughout the game, but despite Arsenal making a couple of chances themselves, the match finished at 1–0 and United travelled to the Emirates Stadium a week later needing only to avoid defeat to become the first defending champions to reach the final since Juventus in 1997. Although Arsenal only needed to overturn a one-goal deficit, their chances of victory were drastically reduced within the first 11 minutes of the match; Park Ji-sung took advantage of a slip by Kieran Gibbs to double United's aggregate lead in the eighth minute, before Ronaldo fired home a 41-yard free kick in the 11th minute. With two away goals on the United scoreboard, Arsenal now had to score four goals to reach the final. However, it was United who scored the next goal, as they hit Arsenal on the break and Ronaldo scored within 15 seconds of Arsenal losing the ball at the other end of the pitch. 15 minutes from time, Arsenal were awarded a penalty kick after Darren Fletcher brought Cesc Fàbregas down in the penalty area, a foul for which Fletcher was sent off – although replays showed that Fletcher knocked the ball away from Fàbregas immediately before bringing him down, resulting in some controversy as to whether Fletcher deserved a red card for the foul. Robin van Persie scored the penalty to make the score 3–1, but it was not enough to prevent United from reaching the final unbeaten for the fourth time in their history.

== Pre-match ==
=== Identity ===
Since 1999, the UEFA Champions League final has been given a unique visual identity to increase the marketing appeal of the event. Designed by London-based design and branding agency Radiant, the theme for the 2009 final was revealed on 25 October 2008, and it incorporated several typically Roman images; the logo was centred around an outline of the European Champion Clubs' Cup, upon which was written "MMIX" – "2009" in Roman numerals; around the base of the trophy was a stylised laurel wreath, and in the background was a simplified image of the interior of the Colosseum. An alternative logo consisting of the UEFA Champions League logo that was surrounded by a laurel wreath was also released. The entire theme was based on a colour scheme of deep red and silver-white.

=== Ticketing ===
Although the usual capacity of the Stadio Olimpico is over 72,000, this was reduced to approximately 67,000 for the 2009 UEFA Champions League final. Approximately 10,000 tickets were made available to the general public, with recipients determined by a random ballot following an application period that ran from 2 to 16 March 2009. Each club was also allocated approximately 20,000 tickets for distribution to fans. Manchester United chose to limit ticket applications to season ticket holders, with preference given to those who had attended more of the club's Champions League away fixtures that season. Barcelona, meanwhile, allotted 80% of their ticket allocation to fans, with the remaining 20% going to the club's corporate sponsors. Unlike United, however, Barcelona opened ticket applications to all 150,000 of their members. The remaining 17,000 tickets were retained by UEFA for the "European football family", which comprises UEFA itself, the local organising committee, UEFA's member associations and its commercial partners.

Tickets for the 2009 final were similar to ATM cards, with an integrated chip storing the ticket holder's personal information to ensure that the ticket is being presented by its legitimate owner. As further security, tickets also had to be presented with an adequate form of photographic identification. However, despite these security measures, counterfeit tickets were still produced, forcing UEFA to issue a statement warning people against buying tickets from touts.

Despite only receiving 20,000 tickets for fans, it was expected that around 30,000 Manchester United fans would be travelling to Rome for the final, leading to police warning ticketless fans not to travel amidst fears of potential hooligans making the trip. Fans were also warned to avoid certain areas of the city that are known to be frequented by members of Rome's Ultra fan groups. Despite Rome's reputation as a hotbed for knife-related crime, dubbed "Stab City" by some, UEFA was confident that the 2009 final would pass without incident, but on the morning of the final, there were reports that a Manchester United fan had been stabbed in the leg the previous evening. It was also expected that a similar number of Barcelona fans would be arriving in Rome in the lead-up to the match. After the match, UEFA president Michel Platini praised the Rome police for their arrangement of security for the final.

More than 3,000 Manchester United fans congregated just outside the city in a field that came to be known as "Fergie's Field". The venue provided ticketless fans with the opportunity to watch the match on a giant screen, and kept them away from the streets of Rome's city centre, although the alcohol ban that came into effect in the city at 17:00 (Central European Summer Time) on 26 May was still in force.

=== Related events ===
A trophy handover ceremony was held in Rome on 21 April 2009, at which Ole Gunnar Solskjær, representing Manchester United as the previous season's champions, returned the trophy to UEFA president Michel Platini. Platini then presented the trophy to Gianni Alemanno, the Mayor of Rome, that it might be put on display in and around the city until the day of the final. Also present at the ceremony were the president and vice-president of the Italian Football Federation, Giancarlo Abete and Demetrio Albertini, the ambassador for the final, Bruno Conti, and Emilio Di Toro on behalf of the Italian National Olympic Committee.

=== Match ball ===
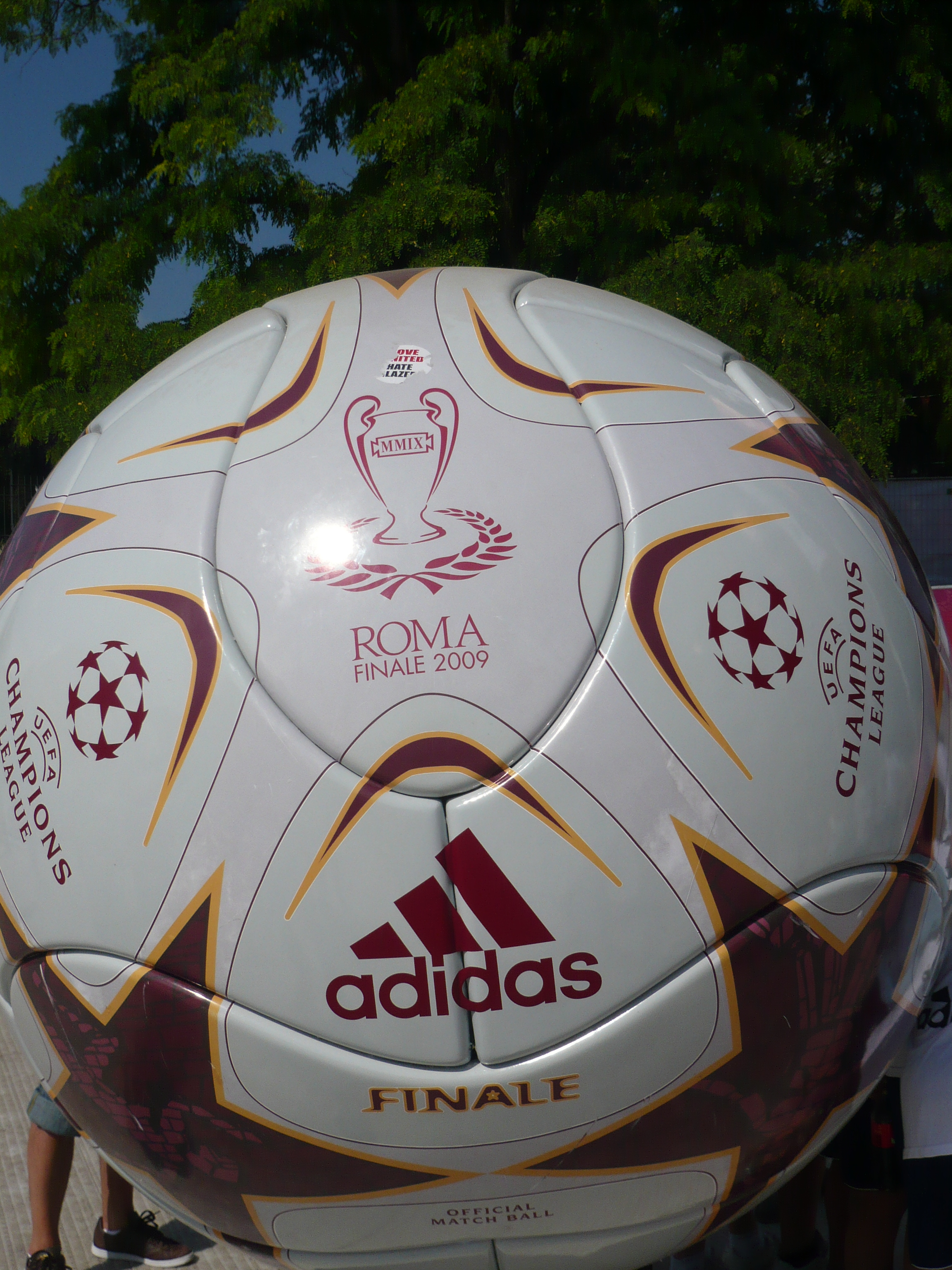
A giant replica of the adidas Finale Rome at the UEFA Champions Festival

The official match ball for the 2009 Champions League final was the adidas Finale Rome. Based on the "Starball" design that has been used for the Champions League final since 2001 and become synonymous with the UEFA Champions League, the Finale Rome was unveiled on 16 March 2009. The colour scheme was a traditional Roman burgundy with a gold border around the stars. The ball used the same panel configuration as the Adidas Europass and the Adidas Teamgeist before it, and the same thermal bonding process was used to adhere the panels to each other, while the surface of the ball featured the same "PSC-Texture" as was debuted with the Europass; the surface of the ball was covered with thousands of tiny pimples, which was designed to improve the grip between boot and ball.

=== Officials ===
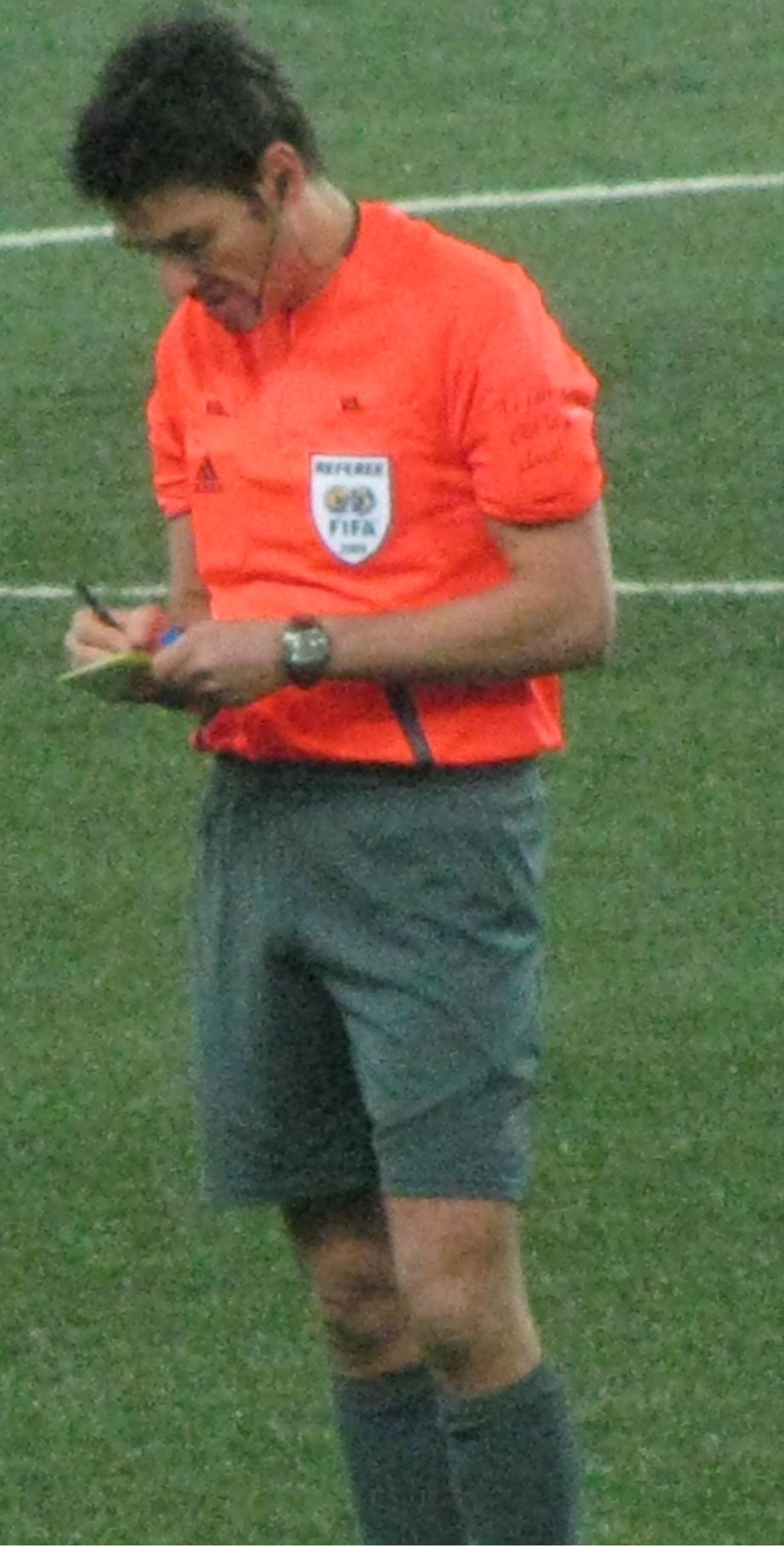
Swiss referee Massimo Busacca at work

The referee for the 2009 UEFA Champions League final was Massimo Busacca, representing the Swiss Football Association. Having been on FIFA's list of internationally accredited referees since 1999, Busacca had experience of officiating 32 UEFA Champions League matches, six of them during the 2008–09 season, and most recently the second leg of Manchester United's quarter-final against Porto on 15 April 2009. He also took charge of the first leg of the semi-final between Manchester United and Barcelona in the 2007–08 competition. Busacca also refereed at both the 2006 FIFA World Cup and UEFA Euro 2008, and took charge of the 2007 UEFA Cup Final between Espanyol and Sevilla at Hampden Park, Glasgow, on 16 May 2007.

As usual, the referee was supported by assistant referees and a fourth official from the same country; in the 2009 final, Massimo Busacca was assisted by Matthias Arnet and Francesco Buragina, with Claudio Circhetta as the fourth official.

=== Kits ===
Having been designated as the official "home" team, Barcelona were given the first choice of kits for the final and opted to wear their traditional red and blue shirts in a halved design. Since the Barcelona home kit clashed with both Manchester United's home and European away kits, the Red Devils wore their white domestic away kit for the first time in a European Cup final. They wore blue for their first European Cup final against Benfica in 1968, but wore red for both of their most recent finals in 1999 and 2008. Manchester United had previously worn white against Barcelona in five matches, losing just one of them – a 2–0 defeat in 1984 – while the only win in white came in the 1991 Cup Winners' Cup final. The other three matches finished in draws: two 3–3 and one 0–0. Barcelona, on the other hand, had won two of their five European Cup finals – they wore orange for their win over Sampdoria in 1992 but wore their usual blue and red stripes for their most recent win in 2006 against Arsenal. However, two of their European Cup final defeats came against teams wearing white – against Steaua București in 1986 and against Milan in 1994.

=== Team selection ===
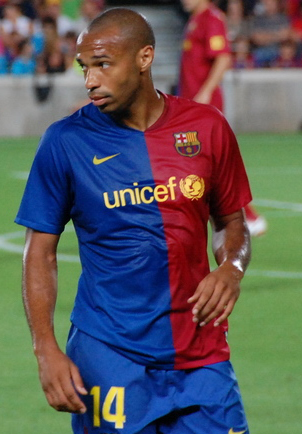
Thierry Henry had suffered knee ligament damage and was a doubt for the final.

Two Barcelona players missed the final through suspension: right-back Dani Alves, who picked up his third yellow card of the tournament in Barcelona's semi-final second leg against Chelsea on 6 May 2009; and left-back Eric Abidal, who was sent off in the same game for a professional foul on Nicolas Anelka. Defender Rafael Márquez also missed the match after he picked up a knee injury in the first leg of the semi-final, ruling him out for the rest of the season. Forward Thierry Henry and semi-final-winning midfielder Andrés Iniesta were also doubts for the final; Henry damaged his right posterior cruciate ligament in Barcelona's 6–2 league win over Real Madrid on 2 May 2009, while Iniesta was discovered to have suffered a tear in his right thigh following Barça's 3–3 draw with Villarreal on 10 May. Both Henry and Iniesta returned to light training on 22 May, but they had not yet resumed training with the main squad and remained doubts for the final. Carles Puyol, however, was available for selection after he served a one-match suspension in the semi-final second leg.

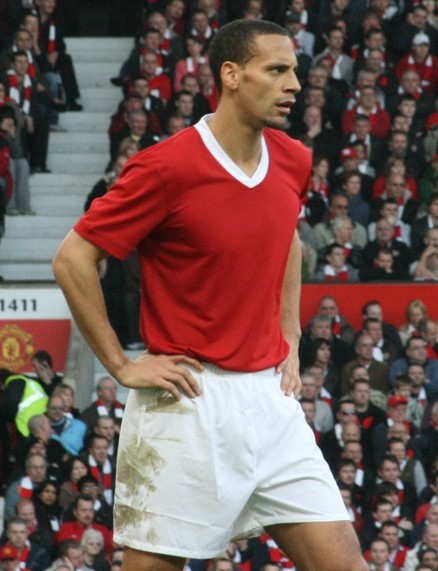
Rio Ferdinand had struggled with a calf injury since the semi-final second leg.

Manchester United's starting right-winger from the 2008 final, Owen Hargreaves, missed the match as he was still in rehabilitation after a double knee operation to cure his tendinitis problems that had seen him play little part in the 2008–09 Champions League campaign. It had been expected that defender Wes Brown would also miss the match after suffering a recurrence of a foot injury, but he returned to training quicker than expected and was involved in United's match against Hull City on 24 May, although he picked up a slight knock during the game. Rio Ferdinand was also a doubt following a calf injury that has kept him out of the United side since the semi-final second leg against Arsenal; Alex Ferguson had said that Ferdinand might not start in Rome if he was not fit to play against Hull, but he later admitted that Ferdinand was on course to recover in time to play in the match. Second-choice goalkeeper Ben Foster also missed the match after requiring surgery to repair a ruptured ligament in his right thumb in May 2009. On the other hand, following John O'Shea's winning goal in Manchester United's semi-final first leg victory over Arsenal, United manager Alex Ferguson suggested that the Irish utility player would be guaranteed a place in the starting line-up were United to reach the final. O'Shea's place in the team was confirmed at Manchester United's media day the week before the final. South Korean midfielder Park Ji-sung was also promised a place in the team after he missed the 2008 final, finally making him the first Asian to appear in a European Cup final. Cristiano Ronaldo suffered a slight injury scare in training the night before the final, requiring a bandage on his lower right leg, but he was eventually fit enough to play in the match.

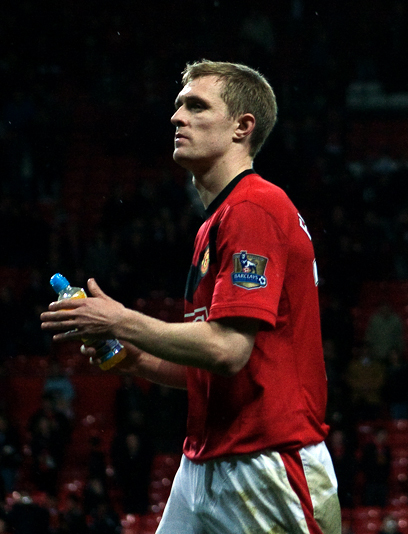
Manchester United unsuccessfully appealed Darren Fletcher's suspension.

Meanwhile, midfielder Darren Fletcher was forced to miss the final after picking up a red card in the second leg of the semi-final. While replays showed that Fletcher played the ball before felling Cesc Fàbregas in the penalty area, the UEFA appeals process only allows for cards to be rescinded in the case of mistaken identity. Despite this, an appeal was submitted by Manchester United on "compassionate" grounds. Barcelona decided to appeal against the suspensions of Abidal and Alves after United lodged an appeal against Fletcher's red card. Barcelona manager Pep Guardiola came out in support of overturning all three players' suspensions. The appeals were declared unsuccessful on 11 May, with UEFA saying in a statement that the appeals were not submitted within the required 24-hour deadline of the matches and that even if they had been submitted on time then "they would have been rejected as unfounded as there were no grounds for contesting the referees' original decisions." By upholding the suspensions, UEFA made Abidal, Alves and Fletcher the first players to miss a Champions League final through suspension since Juventus' Pavel Nedvěd sat out the 2003 final at Old Trafford.

=== Opening ceremony ===
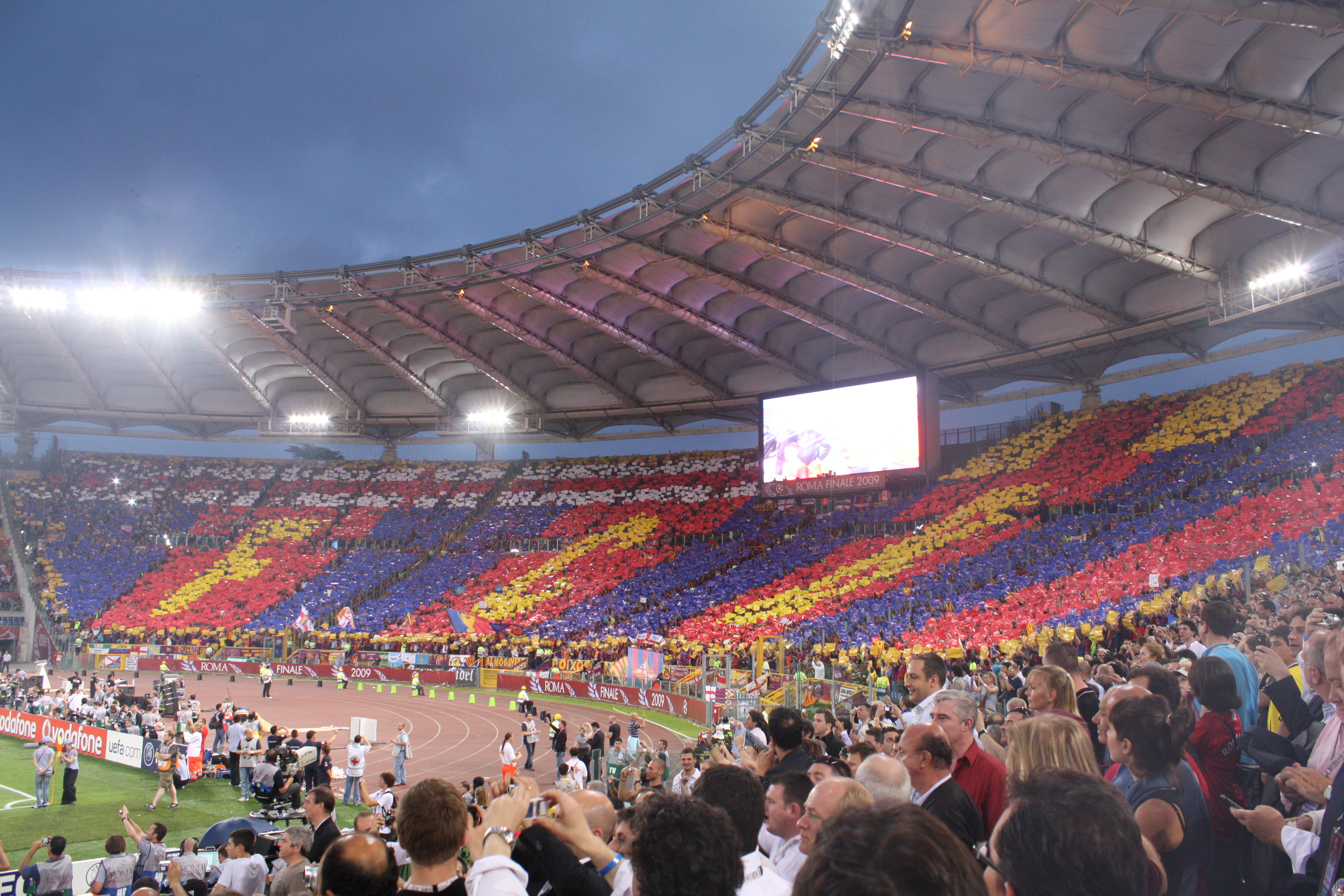

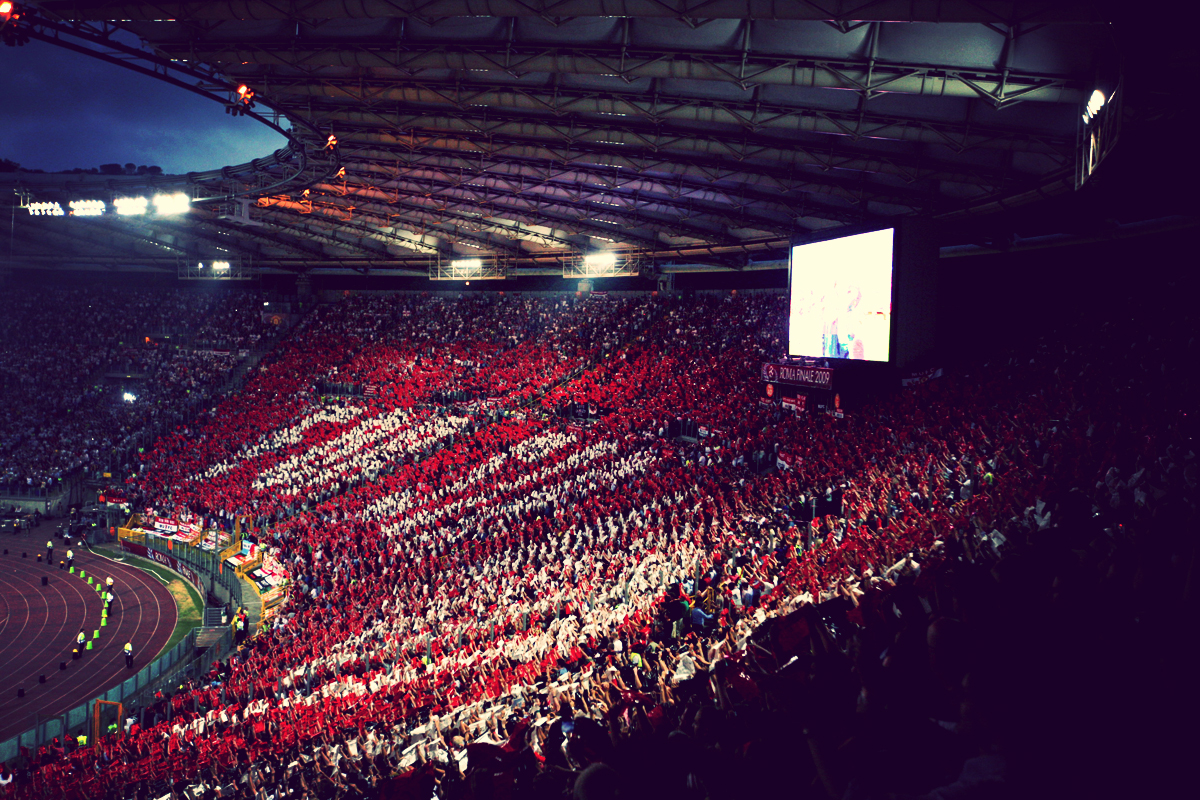
Fans of both teams form club-specific mosaics in the build-up to the match.

The 2009 UEFA Champions League final officially opened with the opening of the UEFA Champions Festival at Rome's Arco di Costantino and the Parco di Colle Oppio above the Colosseum. The Champions Festival was opened by former Italy international goalkeeper Luca Marchegiani on 23 May 2009 and ran until the afternoon on the day of the final, culminating with a football match between a European side coached by former Netherlands international Ruud Gullit and an all-Italian team featuring Milan one-club man Alessandro Costacurta and final ambassador Bruno Conti. Other attractions at the Champions Festival included appearances by representatives from both clubs (Bryan Robson and Ole Gunnar Solskjær for Manchester United and Hristo Stoichkov for Barcelona), exhibitions featuring memorabilia from past UEFA Champions League tournaments and the European Champion Clubs' Cup on display.

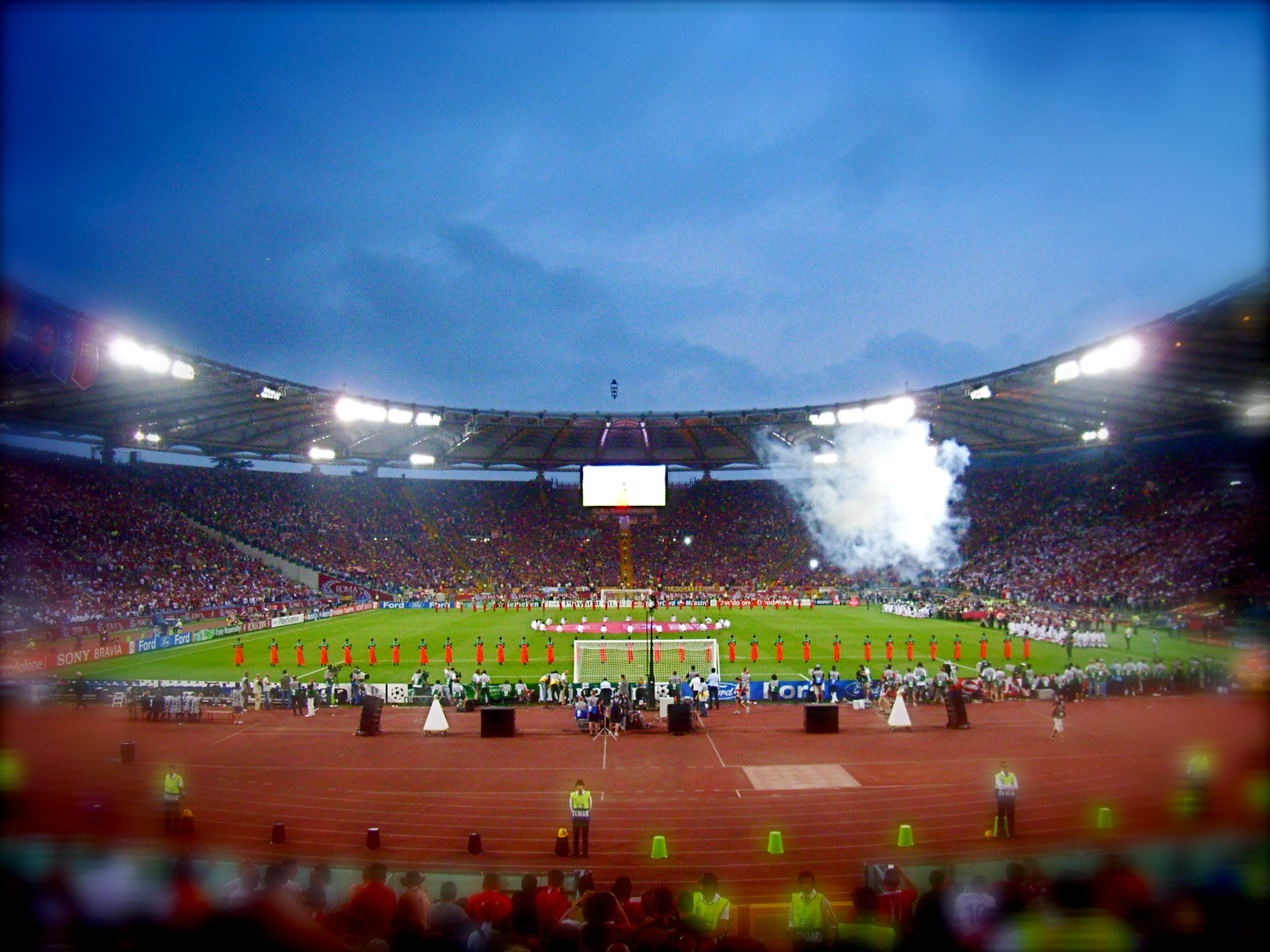
Dancers from the Rustavi Ensemble during the opening ceremony.

Immediately prior to the match itself came the opening ceremony for the final. The ceremony began with 64 members of the Rustavi Ensemble dance group performing a choreographed routine to a variation of the UEFA Champions League Anthem. At the culmination of the routine, the players emerged from the tunnel, accompanied by Italian tenor Andrea Bocelli singing Il Gladiatore – a song based on Earth from the soundtrack to the film Gladiator – before Bocelli sang supporting vocals to the UEFA Champions League Anthem. Before they emerged from their dressing room, manager Pep Guardiola played the Barcelona team a specially commissioned seven-minute film showing their best moments from the season interspersed with clips from the film Gladiator. The film culminated with the late Luciano Pavarotti's version of Nessun Dorma, and it left several of the players in tears. With his players motivated for the game, Guardiola said nothing as they emerged into the tunnel.

== Match ==
=== Summary ===
==== First half ====
Barcelona kicked the match off, but Manchester United showed their intent from the outset, forcing goalkeeper Víctor Valdés to concede a throw-in after just 10 seconds. Further pressure on the attack resulted in Yaya Touré fouling Anderson within Cristiano Ronaldo's shooting range. Ronaldo fired the free kick directly at Valdés, but the Spanish goalkeeper could only parry the ball and Gerard Piqué did well to divert Park Ji-sung's follow-up effort over the bar. The resulting corner was cleared, but only as far as Wayne Rooney, whose snap-shot was wayward and went out for a goal kick.

Both teams struggled to put a flowing move together in the opening exchanges, but it was United who had the better chances, both falling to Ronaldo. The first came in the seventh minute: having been played the ball by Michael Carrick, Ronaldo turned away from Piqué on the edge of the centre circle, before hitting a shot just wide from almost 40 yards; the second saw the ball break to Ronaldo after Anderson and Patrice Evra had linked up well down the left flank. The Portuguese winger controlled the ball on the chest before hitting the ball just past the far post.

Despite United's early pressure, it was Barcelona who scored the first goal of the match. Edwin van der Sar cleared the ball downfield for Manchester United, but it was headed away by Barcelona's midfield anchor Sergio Busquets. Carrick was first to the ball for Manchester United, but he could only head it as far as Xavi, who passed to Andrés Iniesta. The Manchester United defence backed away from the Spaniard, who – after exchanging passes with Lionel Messi – played the ball into the path of Samuel Eto'o in the Manchester United penalty area. Nemanja Vidić attempted to shepherd the Cameroonian striker towards the goal line, but Eto'o easily stepped inside him and toe-poked the ball past Van der Sar to make it 1–0 to Barcelona inside 10 minutes.

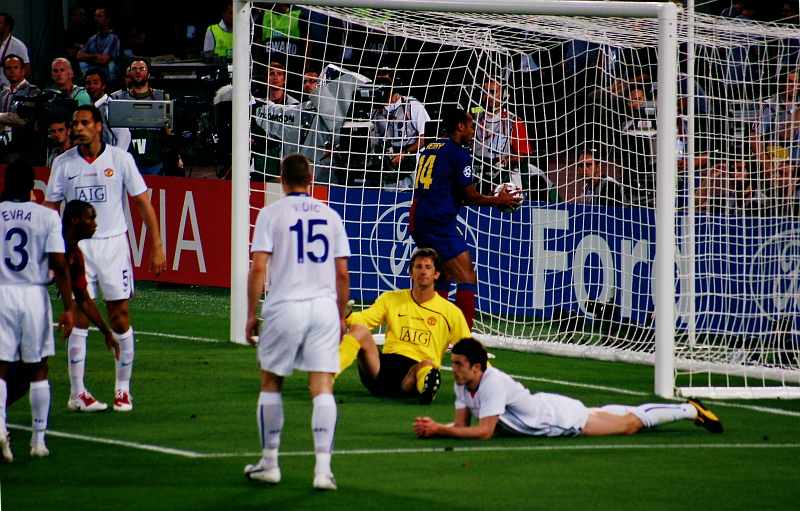
Thierry Henry picks the ball out of the net after Barcelona's first goal.

The goal shifted the balance of the game in Barcelona's favour, as United had been on top in terms of shots and possession up to that point. Almost immediately after the restart, Vidić gave away an unnecessary corner. In a rehearsed corner move, Xavi played the ball back to the edge of the penalty area towards Messi, but the tournament's top scorer was unable to make a proper connection. Nevertheless, Barça retained possession through some sharp inter-passing involving Xavi and Iniesta. When United did manage to regain the ball, however, it was quickly given away by a poor pass from Carrick, while Anderson mis-timed a kick and completely missed the ball. It was now Barcelona's turn to pressurise the United players, forcing them into backward passes or long, hopeful balls forward.

The quality of the teams' passing remained the main difference between them; however, in the 16th minute, Barcelona lost the ball and Ryan Giggs sent a long ball forward to Ronaldo. Ronaldo's first touch took him inside Piqué before going back outside the former Manchester United defender, who cynically blocked Ronaldo's run, earning himself the first yellow card of the match. Ronaldo shaped to take the free kick himself, but it was Giggs who shot for goal, only to curl the ball just over the bar.

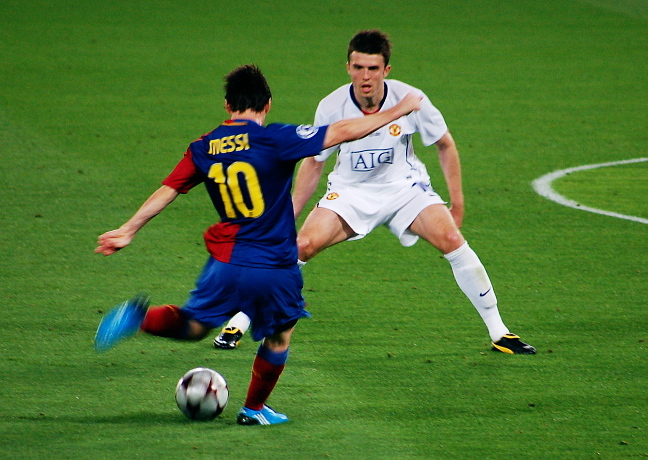
Michael Carrick (background) watches as Lionel Messi shoots.

Barcelona responded quickly, as Carles Puyol found Eto'o with a long throw-in down the right wing. The Cameroonian then found Messi, who cut inside and hit a curling 35-yard shot that just shaved the top of the crossbar. A quick-passing move from United followed, culminating with a through-ball to Park in the inside right channel, only for Valdés to cut out the pass, taking out the South Korean in the process. The resulting throw-in eventually broke to Ronaldo, whose 30-yard shot went just wide. Valdés' clash with Park, however, left him requiring treatment, and although the injury was not sufficient to necessitate a substitution, Valdés chose to leave his next few goal kicks to Piqué.

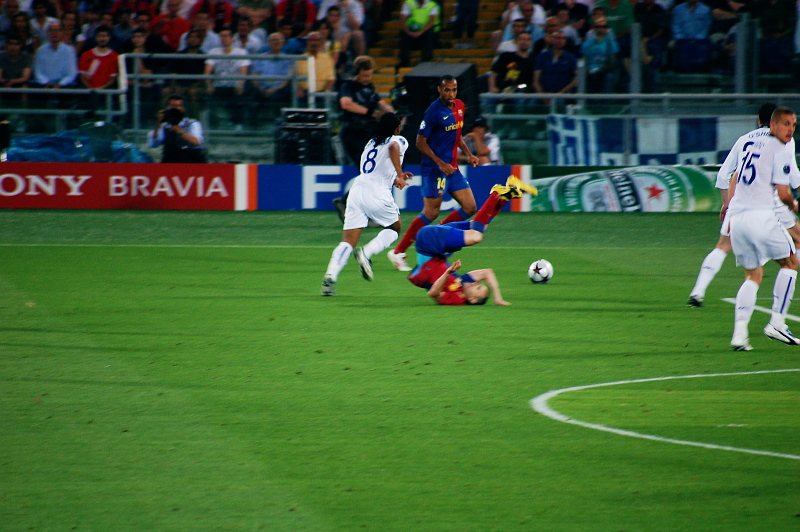
Andrés Iniesta (on the ground) is fouled by Anderson (number 8).

In the 22nd minute, a lofted through-pass from Carrick found Rooney on the left wing, but the Liverpudlian's cross was blocked by Touré and went out for a corner kick. The corner, taken by Giggs, found Ronaldo, but the Portuguese got too far under the ball and headed over. Precise passing from the Barcelona midfield got the Catalans moving upfield until a shoulder charge from Anderson sent Iniesta stumbling to the ground in the inside-left channel 30 yards from goal. The consequent free kick was taken by Xavi, who sent the ball just wide of the near post. Another free kick followed, as Messi was bundled over by a double-challenge from Vidić and Carrick, but it came to nothing.

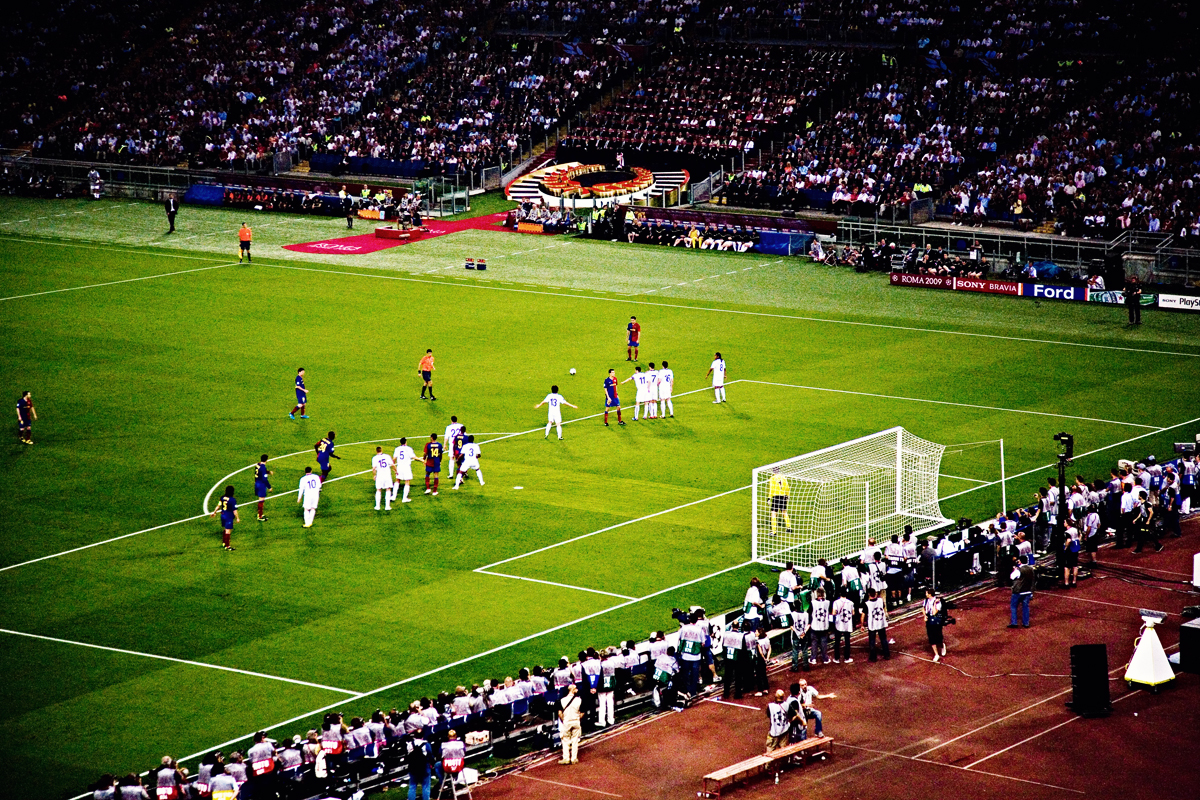
Xavi prepares to take the consequent free kick.

With ten minutes left until half-time, the Manchester United defence effectively switched off and allowed Touré to dribble unopposed to within 15 yards of their penalty area before slipping the ball out wide to Puyol, whose low cross was diverted behind by Vidić. The corner kick was taken short and the eventual cross was headed behind for another corner on the opposite side by Evra. The second corner was crossed in towards Piqué, but he was unable to make contact with the ball.

With half-time fast approaching, Barcelona's confidence began to show: first, Messi attempted to flick a pass over the top of the United defence to Thierry Henry, which Rio Ferdinand intercepted; Iniesta then tried an ambitious back-heel that Van der Sar collected; and finally Messi sped through three Manchester United defenders towards the by-line, only for his cut-back cross to be pounced upon by Van der Sar and then cleared by Vidić. On the stroke of half-time, Iniesta himself then attempted to flick the ball through to Henry, but it was just too high for the French striker, and referee Massimo Busacca took that cue to blow the whistle for the interval.

==== Second half ====
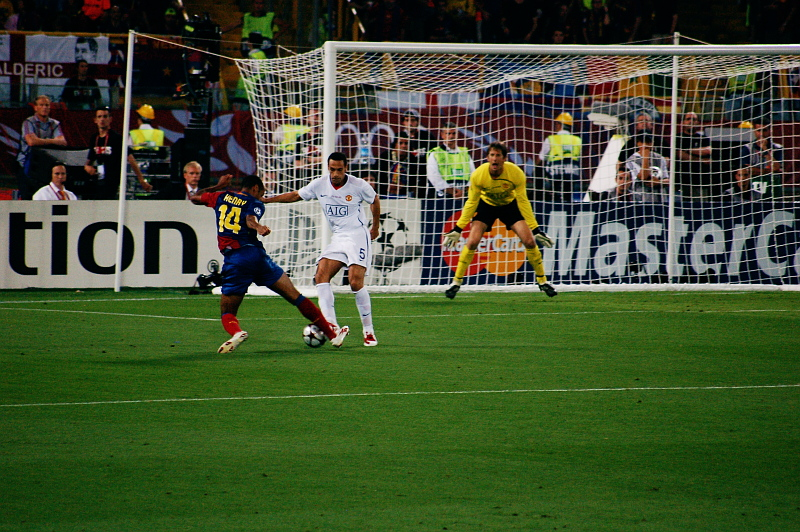
Thierry Henry takes on Rio Ferdinand in the Manchester United penalty area.

After bringing on Carlos Tevez in place of Anderson at half time, Manchester United kicked off the second half in a different formation, with Tevez joining Ronaldo up front in a familiar 4–4–2. Both teams attempted to settle into their customary passing rhythms, but – unlike the first half – it was Barcelona who settled first; Manchester United's passes in their attacking third of the field failed to find their targets, and Iniesta eventually came away with the ball before flicking a pass through to Xavi, who played a through-ball to Henry on the left wing. The French forward turned Ferdinand inside-out, but his shot from a narrow angle was straight at Van der Sar and ended up going out for a throw-in. Xavi then again passed the ball out to the left flank, where Henry nonchalantly left it for the on-rushing Sylvinho; the Brazilian full-back whipped in a cross for Eto'o, but it was caught on the edge of the six-yard box by Van der Sar.

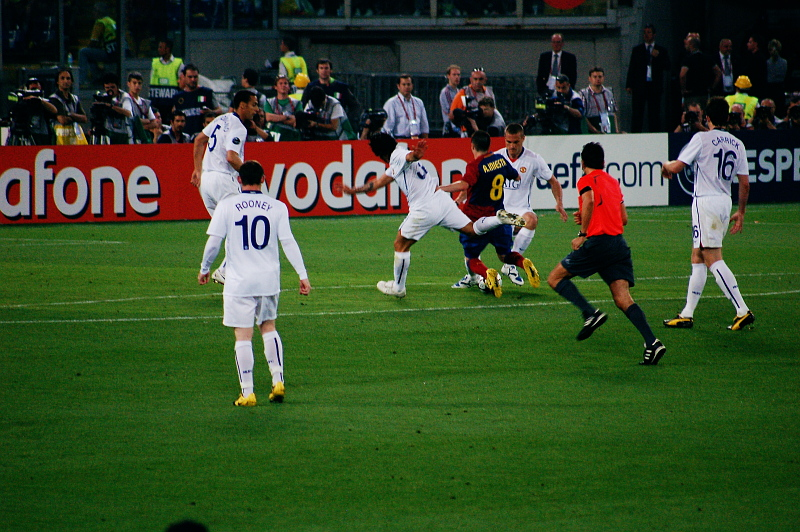
Carlos Tevez fouls Andrés Iniesta on the edge of the Manchester United penalty area.

Pressure high up the pitch from Barcelona kept Manchester United in their own half, forcing them into attempting long balls downfield. A scrappy few moments in and around the centre circle followed, but Manchester United eventually came away with the ball. However, a lapse in communication between Giggs and Evra on the left wing allowed Eto'o to steal in and advance on the Manchester United goal. He cut in from the right wing and played a through-ball just out of reach of Messi, who went to ground after O'Shea had put his hand on Messi's shoulder. A period of sustained pressure from Barcelona followed, culminating with a run from Iniesta, who could only be stopped by a foul from Tevez on the edge of the Manchester United penalty area. The consequent free kick was taken by Xavi, who curled the ball around the defensive wall and onto the post with Van der Sar beaten.

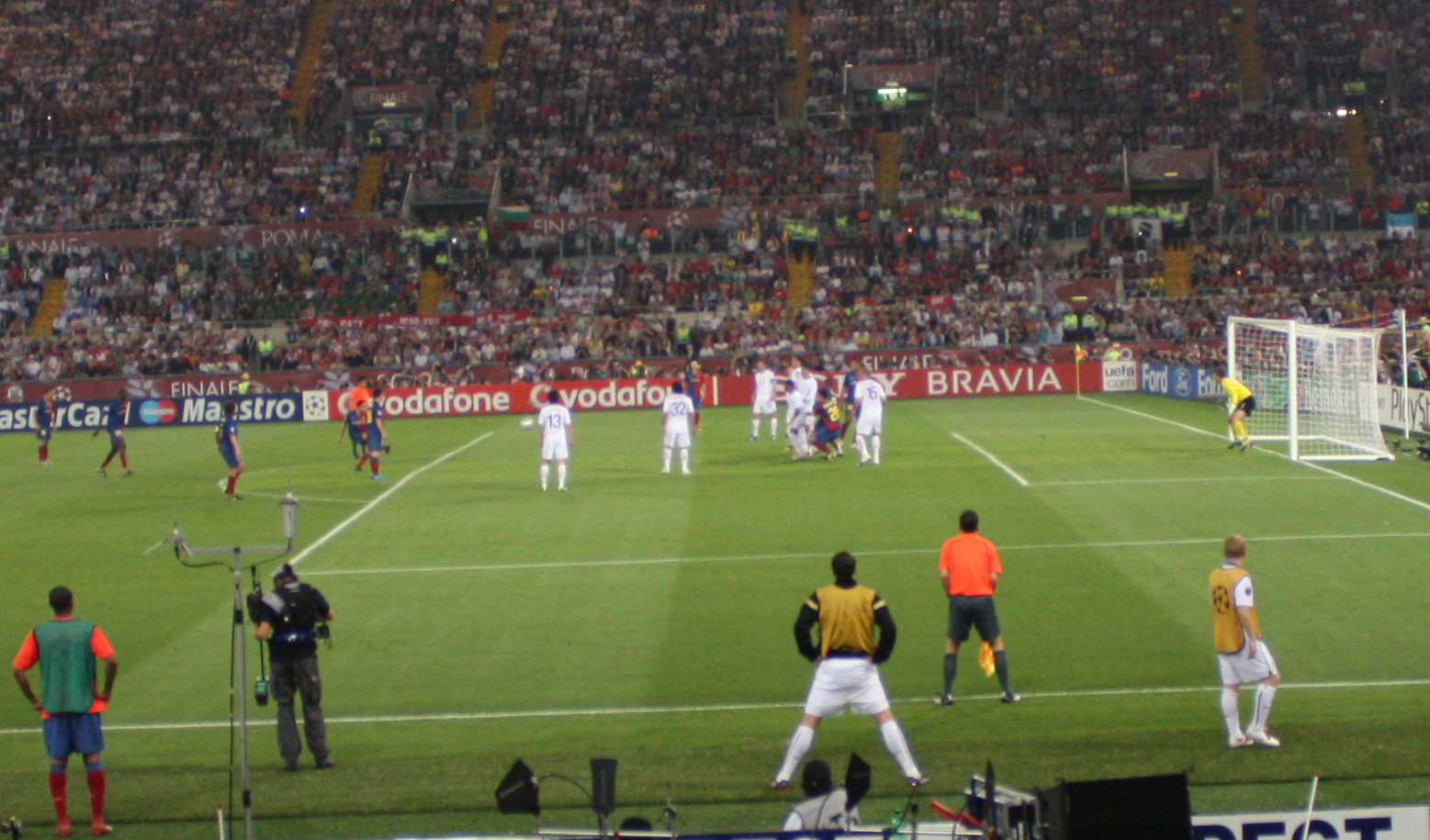
Xavi hits the free kick towards goal.

United responded with their first extended period of possession of the half, working the ball into wide areas to be crossed into the middle, but Rooney's first couple of attempted centres were well cleared by Piqué. At the third attempt, though, Rooney's cross evaded the Barcelona defence as Touré kicked at thin air; however, it also failed to find a Manchester United player in the penalty area, both Ronaldo and Park going close. After Ronaldo was called offside in the 59th minute – despite appearing to be level with the last defender – Giggs stole the ball mid-way inside the Barcelona half before playing the ball to Ronaldo on the left wing. The Portuguese forward stepped over the ball several times in an attempt to wrong-foot Puyol, before cutting inside and playing the ball across the edge of the area towards Carrick. A sliding challenge from Busquets prevented a shot, only for the English midfielder to slide the ball out for a Barcelona goal kick while attempting to play Rooney through. Rooney was again played down the right wing a few moments later, but his low cross was diverted behind by Piqué, and the resulting corner came to nothing. A left-wing attack from Ronaldo followed, but after cutting inside, he gave the ball away cheaply. Barcelona immediately went on the attack down the other end, but Henry was unable to get past O'Shea and his shot was well saved by Van der Sar low at the near post.

In the 66th minute, Alex Ferguson completed his attacking quartet by bringing Dimitar Berbatov on in place of Park. Ronaldo was penalised for a high elbow when challenging for a header with Puyol a minute later, before Rooney forced another corner off Piqué in the 69th minute. However, United's numbers up front in search of another goal left them wanting in defence; a weak clearance from Van der Sar was cut out by Puyol who played the ball to Eto'o on the right side of the penalty area. The ball broke to Xavi on the edge of the area, who crossed for Messi to send a looping header over the United goalkeeper and into the far side of the goal for a two-goal lead. Immediately after the goal, Henry was replaced by Seydou Keita, allowing Barcelona to adopt a more defensive stance.

United responded to the goal immediately, as Giggs made a surging run through the Barcelona defence before playing the ball to Berbatov in the inside-right channel. The Bulgarian forward's low cross found Giggs in the centre, and the United captain's shot was deflected to Ronaldo on the far side of the goal, only for the Portuguese's shot to be blocked by Valdés. The resulting corner reached Berbatov on the far side of the goal, but it was deemed to have crossed the goal line first and Barcelona were awarded a goal kick, from which they launched another attack. Messi played a through-ball to Puyol on the right flank, but as the Barcelona captain reached the goal line, he was fouled by Ronaldo, who – despite going in two-footed – escaped the referee's book. Puyol himself rose to head Xavi's free kick towards goal, but it was directly at Van der Sar, who claimed the ball easily.

Manchester United used their third and final substitute in the 75th minute, replacing Giggs with Paul Scholes, who took over as team captain. Ronaldo and Scholes each received yellow cards in the 78th and 80th minutes, respectively; Ronaldo's yellow card was awarded for a robust shoulder-charge on Puyol as the Barcelona right back shepherded the ball out for a goal kick, while Scholes was booked for a late challenge on Busquets. While the referee played advantage after Scholes' foul, Iniesta cut inside from the left wing and hit a shot that was saved above the head of Van der Sar. An extended spell of Barcelona possession followed, as they strung a series of around 20 passes together, culminating with Puyol attempting to clip the ball over the onrushing Van der Sar, who blocked the shot. Both players went for the follow-up, but the Dutch goalkeeper was first to the ball and sent Puyol sprawling.

In the 85th minute, Scholes clipped the ball over the top of the Barcelona defensive line to Rooney, who chested the ball down for Tevez, only to be given offside. Scholes then found Rooney again on the left wing with a raking ball from deep inside his own half, but Rooney's first touch was heavy, allowing Puyol to get back and put the ball out for a corner. Rooney took the corner short to Tevez, whose cross was just beyond the reach of Berbatov and diverted behind again by Puyol. Rooney also took the second corner, which was met by Berbatov, but he put the ball high over the crossbar.

As the match entered its closing stages, the referee allotted a minimum of three minutes of injury time. The first of these saw Van der Sar make a poor pass after the ball was played back to him by Ferdinand, allowing Iniesta to steal in and play the ball towards Messi in the United penalty area, only for Vidić to get there ahead of the Argentine and knock the ball out for a corner. Barcelona manager Pep Guardiola brought Pedro on for Iniesta in the second minute of added time, before Vidić was immediately shown a yellow card for a clash of heads with Messi when going for a header. That was to be the final act of the match, as referee Massimo Busacca blew for full-time as soon as Xavi took the free kick.

=== Details ===
27 May 2009
20:45 UTC+2

Barcelona (Spain)	2–0	(England) Manchester United
Eto'o 10'; Messi 70'	Report

Stadio Olimpico, Rome
Attendance: 62,467
Referee: Massimo Busacca (Switzerland)

Barcelona	Manchester United

GK	1	(Spain) Víctor Valdés
RB	5	(Spain) Carles Puyol (c)
CB	24	(Ivory Coast) Yaya Touré
CB	3	(Spain) Gerard Piqué	(yellow card) 16'
LB	16	(Brazil) Sylvinho
DM	28	(Spain) Sergio Busquets
CM	6	(Spain) Xavi
CM	8	(Spain) Andrés Iniesta		(substituted off) 90+2'
RW	10	(Argentina) Lionel Messi
LW	14	(France) Thierry Henry		(substituted off) 72'
CF	9	(Cameroon) Samuel Eto'o
Substitutes:
GK	13	(Spain) José Manuel Pinto
DF	2	(Uruguay) Martín Cáceres
DF	46	(Spain) Marc Muniesa
MF	15	(Mali) Seydou Keita		(substituted on) 72'
FW	7	(Iceland) Eiður Guðjohnsen
FW	11	(Spain) Bojan
FW	27	(Spain) Pedro		(substituted on) 90+2'
Manager:
(Spain) Pep Guardiola

GK	1	(Netherlands) Edwin van der Sar
RB	22	(Republic of Ireland) John O'Shea
CB	5	(England) Rio Ferdinand
CB	15	(Serbia) Nemanja Vidić	(yellow card) 90+3'
LB	3	(France) Patrice Evra
CM	8	(Brazil) Anderson		(substituted off) 46'
CM	16	(England) Michael Carrick
CM	11	(Wales) Ryan Giggs (c)		(substituted off) 75'
RW	13	(South Korea) Park Ji-sung		(substituted off) 66'
LW	10	(England) Wayne Rooney
CF	7	(Portugal) Cristiano Ronaldo	(yellow card) 78'
Substitutes:
GK	29	(Poland) Tomasz Kuszczak
DF	21	(Brazil) Rafael
DF	23	(Northern Ireland) Jonny Evans
MF	17	(Portugal) Nani
MF	18	(England) Paul Scholes	(yellow card) 81'	(substituted on) 75'
FW	9	(Bulgaria) Dimitar Berbatov		(substituted on) 66'
FW	32	(Argentina) Carlos Tevez		(substituted on) 46'
Manager:
(Scotland) Sir Alex Ferguson

UEFA Man of the Match:
Xavi (Barcelona)
Fans' Man of the Match:
Lionel Messi (Barcelona)

Assistant referees:
Matthias Arnet (Switzerland)
Francesco Buragina (Switzerland)
Fourth official:
Claudio Circhetta (Switzerland)

=== Statistics ===
First half
Statistic	Barcelona	Manchester United
Goals scored	1	0
Total shots	4	8
Shots on target	1	1
Saves	1	0
Ball possession	54%	46%
Corner kicks	3	2
Fouls committed	3	3
Offsides	0	2
Yellow cards	1	0
Red cards	0	0

Second half
Statistic	Barcelona	Manchester United
Goals scored	1	0
Total shots	7	4
Shots on target	7	1
Saves	1	5
Ball possession	48%	52%
Corner kicks	1	5
Fouls committed	4	7
Offsides	2	3
Yellow cards	0	3
Red cards	0	0

Overall
Statistic	Barcelona	Manchester United
Goals scored	2	0
Total shots	11	12
Shots on target	8	2
Saves	2	5
Ball possession	51%	49%
Corner kicks	4	7
Fouls committed	7	10
Offsides	2	5
Yellow cards	1	3
Red cards	0	0

== Post-match ==
=== Trophy presentation ===
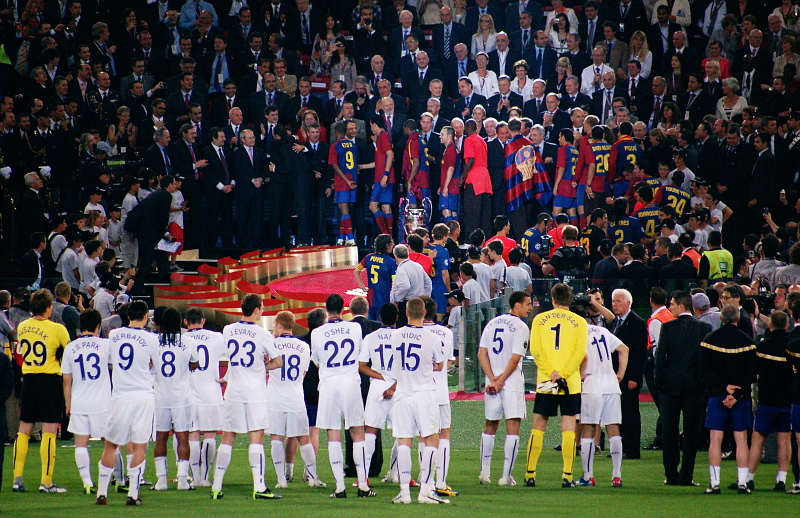
Manchester United's players look on as their Barcelona counterparts receive their winners' medals.

At the final whistle, Barcelona manager Pep Guardiola offered his commiserations to each of Manchester United's players, while former Manchester United defender Gerard Piqué talked with his erstwhile teammates. Both teams then retreated to either end of the stadium to applaud their fans.

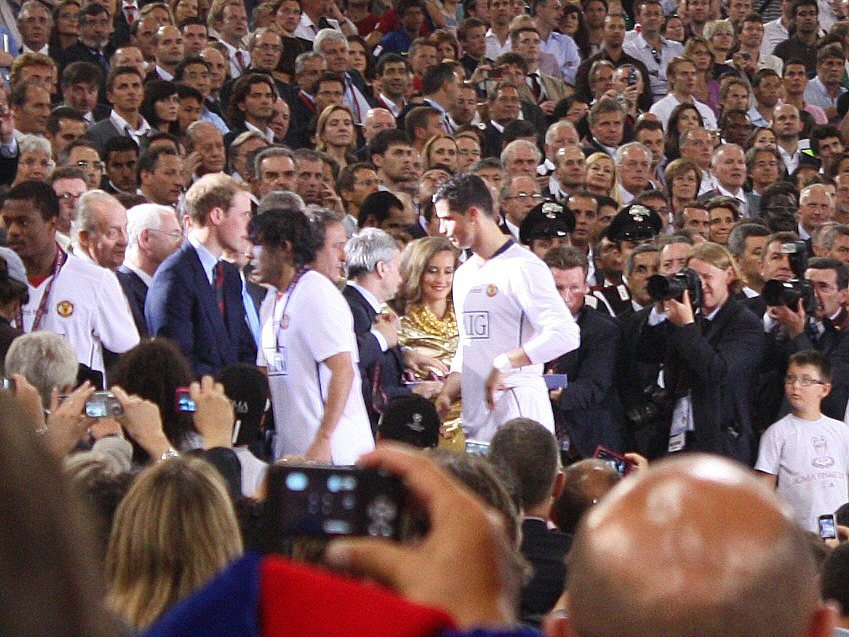
Prince William looks on as Cristiano Ronaldo receives his runners-up medal from UEFA President Michel Platini.

While match referee Massimo Busacca and his assistants collected their mementoes of the final, the Barcelona team formed a guard of honour for the Manchester United players, just as the English side had done for Chelsea in 2008. Led by their manager, Alex Ferguson, and team captain, Ryan Giggs, the Manchester United team then ascended the specially constructed rostrum to collect their runners-up medals from UEFA president Michel Platini and secretary David Taylor. Other dignitaries present included Manchester United chief executive David Gill; The Football Association's president Prince William, and chairman Lord Triesman; Barcelona president Joan Laporta; Juan Carlos I of Spain; Royal Spanish Football Federation president Ángel María Villar; and Italian Prime Minister Silvio Berlusconi. Ferguson also collected a commemorative plaque from Platini, but immediately handed it to Giggs.

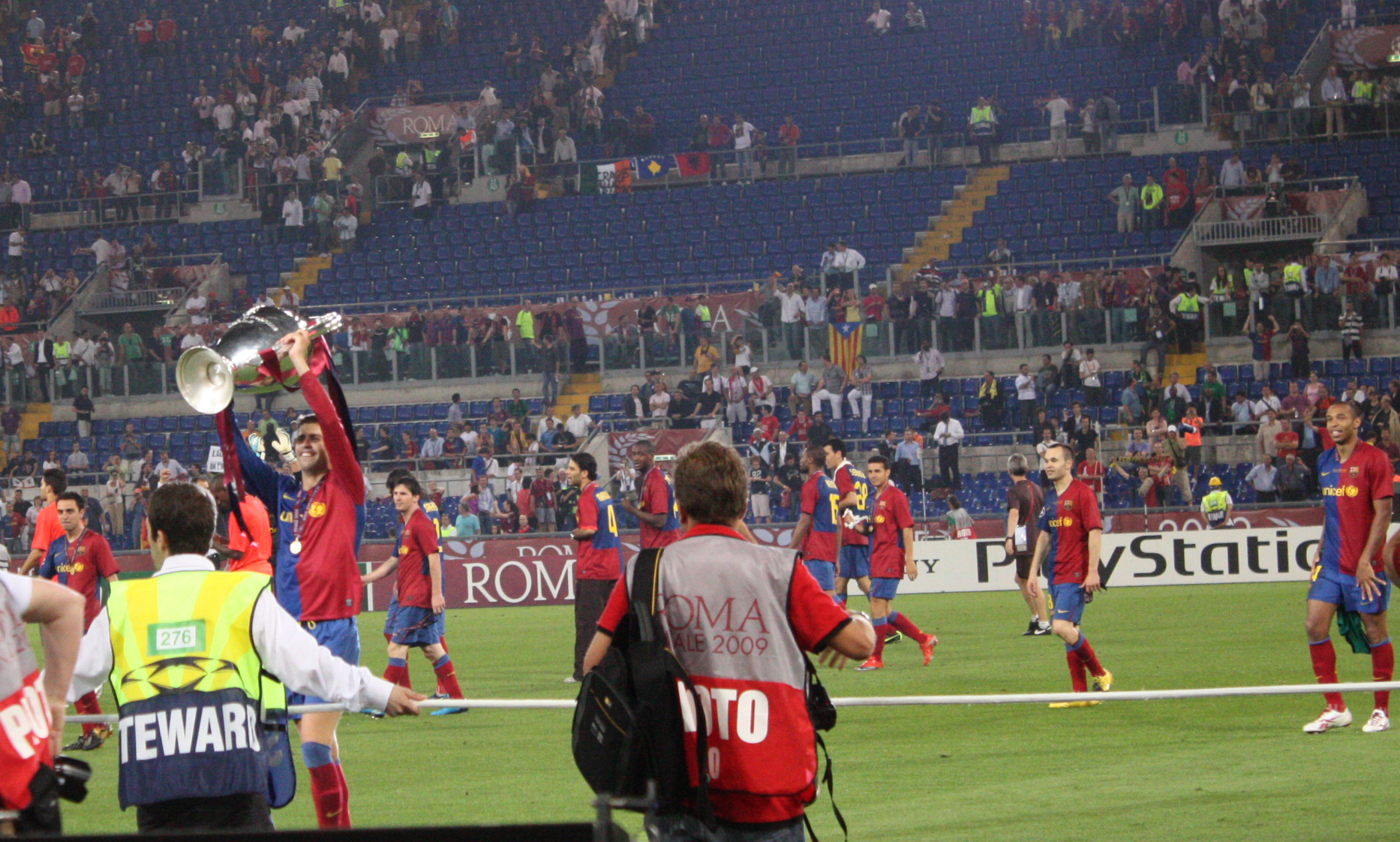
The Barcelona team, celebrating their victory with the European Champion Clubs' Cup.

After offering his commiserations to Manchester United's players, Joan Laporta then joined the Barcelona team to lead them up the podium, closely followed by manager Guardiola. Laporta himself collected Barcelona's commemorative plaque before accepting a medal from Platini. Once the entire Barcelona team had collected their medals, Platini made his way to the front of the podium to present Carles Puyol with the European Champion Clubs' Cup. The Barcelona captain promptly held the trophy aloft with accompaniment from the UEFA Champions League Anthem and explosions of golden confetti, before leading his team on a lap of honour.

=== Reaction ===
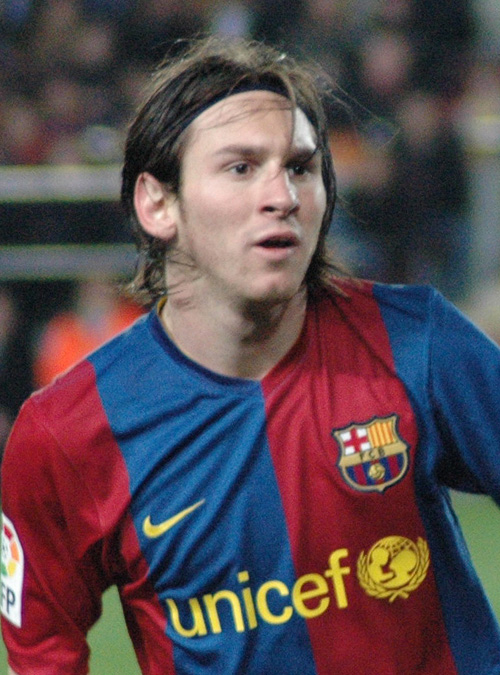
Barcelona's Lionel Messi was voted as man of the match by UEFA.com users.

We're not the best team in Barça history but we've had the best season.

— Josep Guardiola, 27 May 2009

During the match, users on UEFA.com were able to vote for their man of the match; the public vote went to the scorer of Barcelona's second goal, Lionel Messi. The UEFA Technical Study Group, however, chose the man who provided the cross for Messi's goal, Xavi, as their man of the match, citing his control of the tempo of the match as the reason for their decision. Barcelona manager Pep Guardiola took the time to give special praise to Messi, whom he said he moved back into the midfield to increase the team's effectiveness when in possession of the ball. Messi had been withdrawn from his usual right-wing role into a more central position, while Samuel Eto'o, who had started the match as Barcelona's lone centre-forward, was moved out to the right. Guardiola also lauded the bravery of his entire team, stating that he believed that his team's victory hinged on their hard work and propensity for taking risks in attack, but he admitted that although his side had had the best season in the history of the club, they were not yet the best Barcelona team.

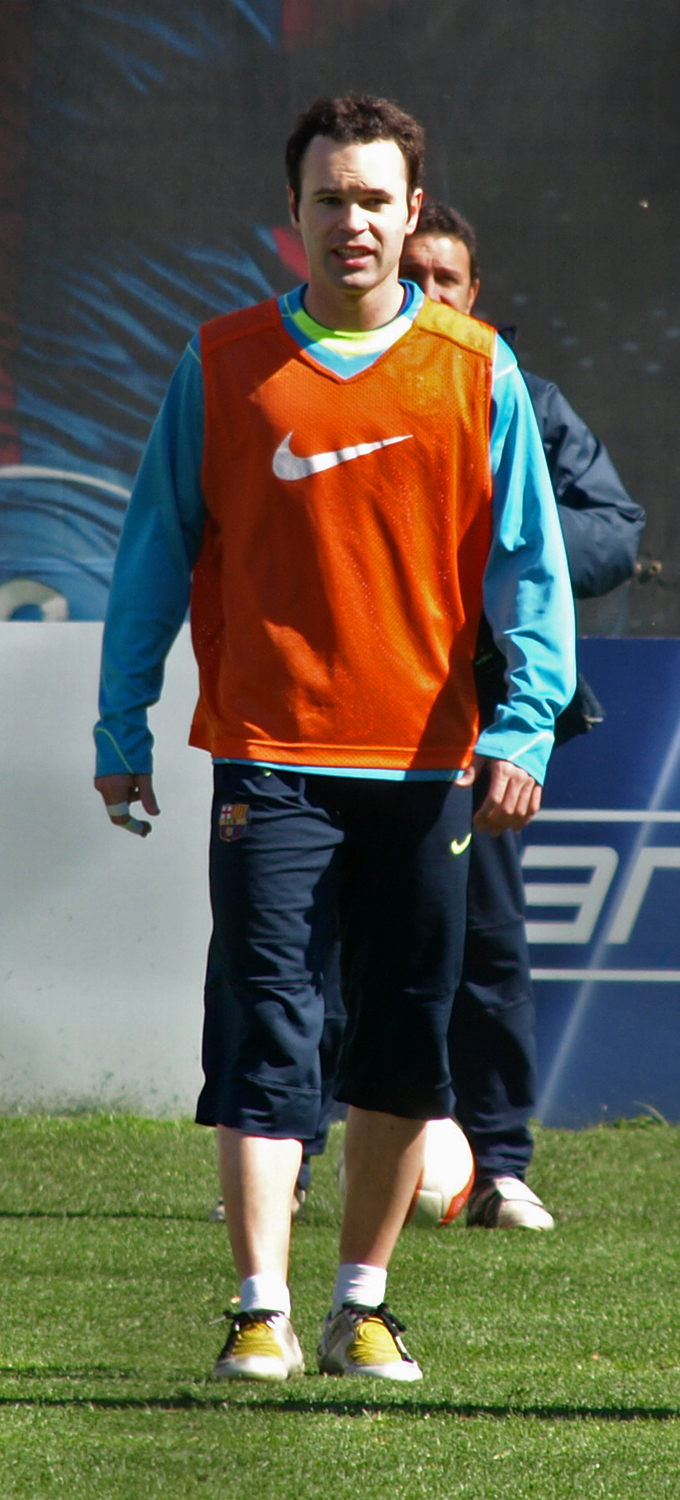
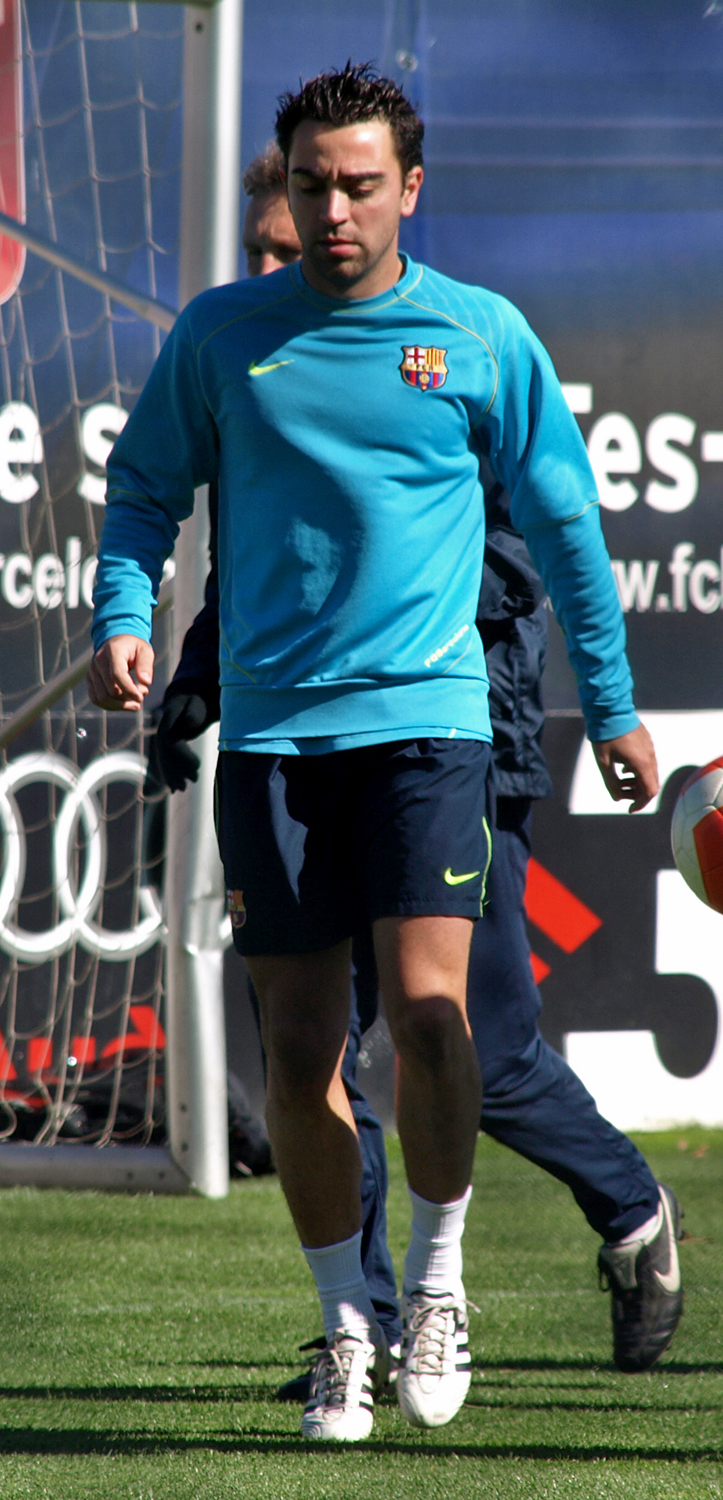
Barcelona's victory hinged on the performances of Andrés Iniesta (left) and Xavi (right).

In the Manchester United camp, manager Alex Ferguson admitted that his team had been beaten by the better side and that the game was all but lost after the first goal. United forward Cristiano Ronaldo, however, criticised his team's tactics, saying that "everything went wrong". Ferguson paid tribute to Messi and the midfield partnership of Xavi and Iniesta, while Wayne Rooney lauded Iniesta as "the best player in the world". Ferguson also expressed his regret at the unavailability of midfielder Darren Fletcher, who was suspended for the match, and lamented at his side's "shoddy" defending and ineffectiveness when in possession. Nevertheless, Ferguson paid tribute to Guardiola's achievement of winning the treble in his first season of management. Barcelona's victory also made Guardiola only the sixth man to win the competition as both a player and a manager, following in the footsteps of Miguel Muñoz, Giovanni Trapattoni, Johan Cruyff, Carlo Ancelotti and, most recently, Frank Rijkaard, who also won the Champions League as Barcelona manager.

You have to give credit to a very good Barcelona team – the better team won.

— Sir Alex Ferguson, 27 May 2009

The match turned out to be the last for Carlos Tevez as a Manchester United player, as he chose not to make his loan spell with the club permanent and joined their local rivals, Manchester City. After announcing his intention to leave Manchester United, Tevez criticised Ferguson's team selection for the 2009 Champions League final, saying that Ferguson should have included him in the starting line-up, with the rationale that the match was the only final that Manchester United had lost in his time at the club.

The match was also Ronaldo's last game at Manchester United for over twelve years, as he completed a world record £80 million transfer to Real Madrid on 1 July. He would later go on to rejoin United in August 2021, and departing once more in November 2022.

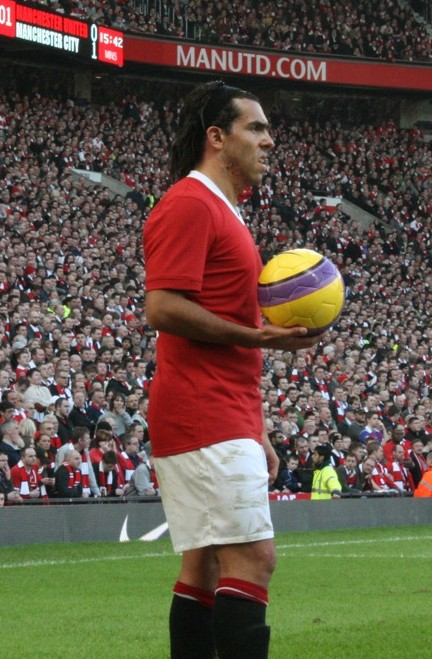
Carlos Tevez chose to leave Manchester United at the end of his contract in June 2009.

Television audiences for the final reached more than 10 million in both Spain and the United Kingdom. 11.3 million people watched the match on Spain's Antena 3 network – the largest viewing figures for that station in the past year – while another 600,000 watched on Canal+ Spain. In the United Kingdom, however, although the match received the highest ratings of any programme that evening, viewing figures were down by 1.5 million on the previous year's final, with just 9.6 million watching on ITV1, although an additional 1.79 million watched on Sky Sports 1. Despite there being no Italian or French representative in the final, the figures were much the same in those two countries as they were in Spain and the United Kingdom, with Italy's Rai Uno garnering an average viewership of 9.63 million and France's TF1 receiving 8.25 million. Only 6.55 million people watched the match on Germany's Sat.1 channel. According to a survey, global viewing figures for the match averaged 109 million; this put the UEFA Champions League final above the Super Bowl (106 million viewers in 2009) as the most-watched annual sporting event in the world. Total figures, which included viewers who watched only part of the match, put the Champions League final even further ahead of the Super Bowl, with 206 million viewers compared to 162 million.

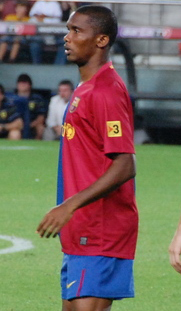
Samuel Eto'o scored the opening goal in the 10th minute of the game.

In the United Kingdom, bookmakers made a profit from bets on a Manchester United victory. William Hill reported two bets of around £20,000 placed on Manchester United, while Paddy Power received one of £5,500 and Ladbrokes one of £3,000. Ladbrokes also took a bet of £10,000 on a Barcelona win, but bookmakers reported that most of the money was put on Manchester United. Extrabet.com paid out £12,000 to a £3,000 bet on Samuel Eto'o to score the first goal at odds of 4–1.

=== Rewards ===
Both teams received significant financial rewards; for winning the final, Barcelona won €7 million in prize money, and Manchester United received €4 million as runners-up. Despite losing the match, Manchester United earned the most money overall from their 2008–09 Champions League campaign, receiving €38.281 million compared to Barcelona's €30.968 million, due to their share of the market pool, based on the value of the television market in their home countries.

As winners of the UEFA Champions League, Barcelona competed in the 2009 UEFA Super Cup, in which they beat 2008–09 UEFA Cup winners Shakhtar Donetsk 1–0 at Stade Louis II in Monaco on 28 August 2009, and in the 2009 FIFA Club World Cup in Abu Dhabi, where they beat Estudiantes of Argentina in the final.

== See also ==
- 1991 European Cup Winners' Cup final – contested by same teams
- 2011 UEFA Champions League final – contested by same teams
- 2008–09 FC Barcelona season
- 2008–09 Manchester United F.C. season
- 2009 UEFA Cup final
- 2009 UEFA Women's Cup final
- FC Barcelona in international football
- Manchester United F.C. in international football
- Messi–Ronaldo rivalry
