= List of Cypriot football transfers summer 2010 =

This is a list of Cypriot football transfers for the 2010–11 summer transfer window by club. Only transfers of clubs in the Cypriot First Division and Cypriot Second Division are included.

The summer transfer window opened on 1 July 2010, although a few transfers took place prior to that date. The window closed at midnight on 31 August 2010. Players without a club may join one at any time, either during or in between transfer windows.

== Marfin Laiki League ==
=== AEK Larnaca ===
In: Note: Flags indicate national team as defined under FIFA eligibility rules; some limited exceptions apply. Players may hold more than one non-FIFA nationality.

No.	Pos.	Nation	Player
—	MF	POR	Margaça (from Doxa Katokopia)
—	MF	POR	Saavedra (from Doxa Katokopia)
—	MF	BRA	Jean Paulista (from APOEL)
—	MF	CYP	Christos Theophilou (from Apollon Limassol)
—	MF	CYP	Jason Demetriou (from (England) Leyton Orient)
—	MF	ARG	Rubén Gómez (from (Ukraine) Zakarpattia Uzhhorod)
—	MF	BRA	Alan (from (Ukraine) Stal Alchevsk)
—	MF	NED	Gregoor van Dijk (from (Netherlands) FC Utrecht)
—	FW	CMR	Njongo Priso (on loan from (Malta) Valletta F.C.)
—	FW	NGR	Sunny Kingsley (from (Ukraine) Metalurh Donetsk)
—	DF	MLT	Luke Dimech (from (Malta) Valletta F.C.)
—	DF	NED	Kevin Hofland (on loan from (Netherlands) Feyenoord)
—	MF	NED	Edwin Linssen (from (Netherlands) Roda JC)
—	MF	NED	Danny Schenkel (from (Netherlands) Willem II)
—	GK	ITA	Marco Fortin (from (Italy) Vicenza Calcio)
—	FW	ESP	Arnal (from (Spain) CE Sabadell)
—	FW	EST	Andres Oper (from (Netherlands) ADO Den Haag)

Out: Note: Flags indicate national team as defined under FIFA eligibility rules; some limited exceptions apply. Players may hold more than one non-FIFA nationality.

No.	Pos.	Nation	Player
—	MF	CYP	Constantinos Mintikkis (loan return to Anorthosis Famagusta)
—	FW	CYP	Kyriakos Panteli (to Omonia Aradippou)
—	FW	CYP	Christos Xenofontos (on loan to Othellos Athienou)
—	MF	CYP	Antonis Panagi (to Nea Salamina)
—	MF	POR	Filipe Fernandes (to (Portugal) Gil Vicente)
—	DF	CPV	Nélson Veiga (released)
—	MF	SLO	Dejan Geric (released)
—	FW	NGR	David Opara (to Aris Limassol)
—	MF	CYP	Adamos Efstathiou (to Aris Limassol)
—	MF	CYP	Marios Georgiou (to ASIL)
—	MF	POR	Eugenio Neves (to Digenis Morphou)
—	FW	NGR	Joshua Izuchukwu (to Nea Salamina)
—	FW	SLO	Jože Benko (to (Slovenia) Nafta Lendava)
—	FW	GRE	Thanasis Kavallaris (on loan to ASIL)
—	DF	CYP	Michalis Michael (on loan to ASIL)
—	MF	POR	Saavedra (on loan to Doxa Katokopia)
—	FW	POR	Milton (to Akritas Chlorakas)
—	MF	POR	Carlos Saavedra (on loan to Doxa Katokopia)
—	MF	ESP	Iván Campo (retired)

=== AEL Limassol ===
In: Note: Flags indicate national team as defined under FIFA eligibility rules; some limited exceptions apply. Players may hold more than one non-FIFA nationality.

No.	Pos.	Nation	Player
—	DF	CYP	Stelios Parpas (loan return from (Romania) FC Steaua)
—	DF	CYP	Pantelis Pitsillos (loan return from Alki Larnaca)
—	DF	CYP	Kyriakos Pelendritis (loan return from Alki Larnaca)
—	DF	POR	Zé Vítor (from (Switzerland) FC St. Gallen)
—	FW	SVK	Pavol Masaryk (from (Slovakia) Slovan Bratislava)
—	MF	EIR	Matthew Cassidy (from Enosis Neon Paralimni)
—	MF	NED	Nicky Hofs (from (Netherlands) Vitesse Arnhem)
—	MF	CYP	Marios Nicolaou (from (Greece) Panionios)
—	MF	NED	Mike Zonneveld (from (Netherlands) PSV Eindhoven)
—	FW	POL	Grzegorz Rasiak (from (England) Reading F.C.)
—	GK	SVK	Andrej Pernecký (from (England) Southampton F.C.)

Out: Note: Flags indicate national team as defined under FIFA eligibility rules; some limited exceptions apply. Players may hold more than one non-FIFA nationality.

No.	Pos.	Nation	Player
—	MF	BRA	Serjão (on loan to Alki Larnaca)
—	DF	POR	Júnior (to Olympiakos Nicosia)
—	MF	CYP	Christos Charalampous (to Aris Limassol)
—	FW	BRA	Clayton (released)
—	DF	VEN	Andrés Rouga (to Ermis Aradippou)
—	MF	POR	Pedro Torrão (to (Portugal) S.C.U. Torreense)
—	GK	AUT	Michael Haunschmid (released)
—	GK	CYP	Panos Constantinou (to APOEL)
—	MF	POR	Ricardo Fernandes (to (Israel) Hapoel Be'er Sheva)
—	DF	CYP	Pantelis Pitsillos (on loan to Aris Limassol)
—	FW	SLE	Allie Andrew (on loan to APEP)
—	FW	CYP	Aggelos Perikleous (on loan to Atromitos Yeroskipou)
—	DF	CYP	Angelos Efthymiou (to AEP Paphos)
—	FW	MKD	Vlatko Grozdanoski (to (Iran) Damash Iranian)

=== AEP Paphos ===
In: Note: Flags indicate national team as defined under FIFA eligibility rules; some limited exceptions apply. Players may hold more than one non-FIFA nationality.

No.	Pos.	Nation	Player
—	DF	BRA	Thiago (free agent)
—	DF	CMR	Jean-Paul Ndeki (from (Latvia) FK Ventspils)
—	MF	EST	Ats Purje (free agent)
—	DF	POR	Santamaria (from (Portugal) Pinhalnovense)
—	MF	BIH	Vladan Grujić (from (Bosnia and Herzegovina) FK Laktaši)
—	DF	POR	Hugo Carreira (from (China) Qingdao Jonoon)
—	DF	CPV	Jimmy Modeste (from (Czech Republic) Bohemians Praha)
—	GK	EST	Artur Kotenko (from (Norway) Viking FK)
—	FW	POR	Pedro Moutinho (from (Scotland) Falkirk)
—	FW	ARG	David Solari (from (Venezuela) Deportivo Táchira)
—	FW	SRB	Ivan Jovanović (from (Serbia) FK Smederevo)
—	GK	LAT	Andrejs Pavlovs (from Akritas Chloraka)
—	DF	CYP	Angelos Efthymiou (from AEL Limassol)
—	DF	SVK	Stanislav Velický (from (Poland) Odra Wodzisław)
—	MF	POL	Maciej Scherfchen (from (Poland) Ruch Chorzów)
—	GK	LAT	Vitālijs Artjomenko (from (Latvia) JFK Olimps/RFS)
—	MF	BEL	Fangio Buyse (free agent)
—	FW	BUL	Ventsislav Ivanov (from (Bulgaria) PFC Montana)
—	FW	CYP	Stefanos Voskaridis (from Nea Salamina)

Out: Note: Flags indicate national team as defined under FIFA eligibility rules; some limited exceptions apply. Players may hold more than one non-FIFA nationality.

No.	Pos.	Nation	Player
—	FW	SEN	Ismail Ba (to Atromitos Yeroskipou)
—	MF	ISR	Moshe Mishaelof (loan return to Apollon Limassol)
—	FW	BFA	Abdul Diallo (loan return to AC Omonia)
—	FW	CYP	Kyriacos Chailis (to Ermis Aradippou)
—	FW	ANG	Tiquinho (released)
—	GK	MKD	Jane Nikolovski (retired)
—	DF	ZAM	Moses Sichone (to (Germany) Carl Zeiss Jena)
—	MF	ESP	Juan Bezares (released)
—	DF	BRA	Anderson (to (Portugal) Vitória F.C.)
—	DF	SLO	Almir Tanjič (to (Slovenia) NK Primorje)
—	DF	BRA	Tinga (released)
—	DF	POR	Hugo Coelho (released)
—	MF	CZE	Martin Kolář (to Apollon Limassol)
—	GK	FRA	Florian Lucchini (to (Bulgaria) Lokomotiv Plovdiv)
—	FW	POR	Bernardo Vasconcelos (to (Israel) Hapoel Be'er Sheva)
—	MF	CYP	Giorgos Georgiou (to Atromitos Yeroskipou)
—	MF	GHA	Imoro Lukman (to APOP Kinyras)
—	GK	LAT	Artūrs Vaičulis (released)

=== Alki Larnaca ===
In: Note: Flags indicate national team as defined under FIFA eligibility rules; some limited exceptions apply. Players may hold more than one non-FIFA nationality.

No.	Pos.	Nation	Player
—	FW	CYP	Charalambos Pittakas (loan return from APEP)
—	MF	MAR	Abdelkarim Kissi (from Ermis Aradippou)
—	MF	BRA	Edmar (from Enosis Neon Paralimni)
—	GK	SRB	Nenad Rajić (from (Serbia) FK Srem)
—	MF	SLO	Anton Žlogar (from AC Omonia)
—	DF	ARG	Emiliano Fusco (from ASIL)
—	FW	BRA	Serjão (on loan from AEL Limassol)
—	FW	JOR	Odai Al-Saify (on loan from (Greece) Skoda Xanthi)
—	MF	CYP	Siniša Dobrasinović (from (Greece) Kavala)
—	DF	SRB	Aleksandar Pantić (free agent)
—	DF	ISR	Haim Megrelashvili (from (Israel) Maccabi Petah Tikva)
—	DF	BRA	Bruno Quadros (from (Japan) F.C. Tokyo)
—	FW	FRA	Christian Nadé (from (Scotland) Hearts)
—	DF	CYP	Andreas Constantinou (from Anorthosis)
—	MF	VEN	Héctor González (from (Bulgaria) Chernomorets)

Out: Note: Flags indicate national team as defined under FIFA eligibility rules; some limited exceptions apply. Players may hold more than one non-FIFA nationality.

No.	Pos.	Nation	Player
—	DF	CYP	Pantelis Pitsillos (loan return to AEL Limassol)
—	DF	CYP	Kyriakos Pelendritis (loan return to AEL Limassol)
—	MF	CYP	Feidias Panayiotou (loan return to AC Omonia)
—	FW	ITA	Giuseppe Ricciardi (to PAEEK FC)
—	FW	ARG	Diego Herrera Gaston (to Atromitos Yeroskipou)
—	DF	ARG	Damián Giménez (to (Argentina) Club Atlético Temperley)
—	FW	CYP	Charalambos Pittakas (to Atromitos Yeroskipou)
—	DF	CYP	Costas Pouros (to Onisilos)
—	DF	ARG	Javier Menghini (to (Argentina) Defensa y Justicia)
—	GK	CYP	Andreas Karseras (to APOP Kinyras)
—	MF	CYP	Alexandros Kanari (on loan to ASIL)
—	DF	CYP	Iacovos Tsolakides (to Chalkanoras Idaliou)
—	MF	MAR	Abdelkarim Kissi (to Ethnikos Achna)
—	DF	SRB	Aleksandar Pantić (released)

=== Anorthosis ===
In: Note: Flags indicate national team as defined under FIFA eligibility rules; some limited exceptions apply. Players may hold more than one non-FIFA nationality.

No.	Pos.	Nation	Player
—	FW	CYP	Constantinos Mintikkis (loan return from AEK Larnaca)
—	FW	CYP	Andreas Papathanasiou (from APOEL)
—	GK	SVK	Matúš Kozáčik (from (Czech Republic) Sparta Prague)
—	GK	ARG	Marcos Argüello (from (Spain) Orihuela CF)
—	FW	CYP	Andreas Kyprianou (from Nea Salamina)
—	MF	ESP	Carles Coto (from (Spain) Benidorm CF)
—	MF	BOL	Ronald García (on loan from (Greece) Aris Thessaloniki)
—	MF	COL	Ricardo Laborde (on loan from (Colombia) Atlético Huila)
—	DF	ESP	Álvaro Brachi (on loan from (Spain) RCD Espanyol)
—	DF	ARG	Pablo Frontini (from (Argentina) Defensa y Justicia)
—	FW	ARG	Lucas Concistre (from (Argentina) Olimpo)
—	FW	CYP	Aggelos Tsiaklis (from (England) Manchester City)
—	DF	ESP	Biel Medina (from (Spain) Gimnàstic de Tarragona)
—	GK	CYP	Nikolas Asprogenis (on loan from AC Omonia)
—	MF	ARG	Damián Lizio (from (Argentina) River Plate II)

Out: Note: Flags indicate national team as defined under FIFA eligibility rules; some limited exceptions apply. Players may hold more than one non-FIFA nationality.

No.	Pos.	Nation	Player
—	DF	GRE	Traianos Dellas (to (Greece) AEK Athens)
—	MF	CYP	Andreas Pittaras (to Ermis Aradippou)
—	FW	GRE	Evangelos Mantzios (loan return to (Greece) Panathinaikos)
—	GK	HUN	Zoltán Nagy (to Doxa Katokopia)
—	MF	RSA	Delron Buckley (released)
—	DF	SRB	Predrag Ocokoljić (to Ethnikos Achna)
—	MF	FRA	Bruno Cheyrou (to (France) FC Nantes)
—	GK	ALB	Arian Beqaj (to Olympiakos Nicosia)
—	DF	CYP	Angelis Charalambous (to (Scotland) Motherwell)
—	DF	CYP	Andreas Constantinou (to Alki Larnaca)
—	DF	CYP	Loukas Stylianou (to Digenis Morphou)
—	FW	CYP	Constantinos Mintikkis (on loan to ASIL)
—	FW	CYP	Andreas Papathanasiou (to Ermis Aradippou)
—	FW	POR	Miguel Pedro (on loan to Ermis Aradippou)
—	DF	GRE	Nikos Katsavakis (to Apollon Limassol)

=== APOEL ===
In: Note: Flags indicate national team as defined under FIFA eligibility rules; some limited exceptions apply. Players may hold more than one non-FIFA nationality.

No.	Pos.	Nation	Player
—	MF	CYP	Demetris Kyriakou (loan return from Olympiakos Nicosia)
—	MF	CYP	Panayiotis Panayiotou (loan return from Digenis Morphou)
—	FW	MKD	Ivan Tričkovski (from (Serbia) Red Star Belgrade)
—	MF	BRA	Gustavo Manduca (from (Greece) AEK Athens)
—	GK	CYP	Panos Constantinou (from AEL Limassol)
—	FW	ARG	Esteban Solari (from (Spain) UD Almería)
—	DF	BRA	William Boaventura (from (Ukraine) Metalurh Donetsk)
—	FW	BRA	Aílton José Almeida (from (Denmark) F.C. Copenhagen)

Out: Note: Flags indicate national team as defined under FIFA eligibility rules; some limited exceptions apply. Players may hold more than one non-FIFA nationality.

No.	Pos.	Nation	Player
—	MF	POL	Kamil Kosowski (to Apollon Limassol)
—	FW	POL	Marcin Żewłakow (to (Poland) GKS Bełchatów)
—	MF	BRA	Jean Paulista (to AEK Larnaca)
—	DF	ALB	Altin Haxhi (to (Greece) Apollon Kalamarias)
—	FW	CYP	Andreas Papathanasiou (to Anorthosis Famagusta)
—	GK	CYP	Sofronis Avgousti (to Apollon Limassol)
—	GK	CYP	Michalis Morfis (to PAEEK FC)
—	FW	SVK	Mário Breška (to (Greece) Olympiacos Volos)
—	MF	CYP	Panayiotis Panayiotou (to Olympiakos Nicosia)

=== Apollon Limassol ===
In: Note: Flags indicate national team as defined under FIFA eligibility rules; some limited exceptions apply. Players may hold more than one non-FIFA nationality.

No.	Pos.	Nation	Player
—	FW	SRB	Miljan Mrdaković (loan return from Ethnikos Achna)
—	MF	ISR	Moshe Mishaelof (loan return from AEP Paphos)
—	MF	ISR	Baruch Dego (from Nea Salamina)
—	MF	VEN	Raúl González (from Enosis Neon Paralimni)
—	FW	NGR	Felix Ogbuke (from (Israel) Hakoah Amidar Ramat Gan)
—	FW	CPV	José Semedo (from APOP Kinyras)
—	GK	CYP	Sofronis Avgousti (from APOEL)
—	MF	POL	Kamil Kosowski (from APOEL)
—	MF	CZE	Martin Kolář (from AEP Paphos)
—	DF	ARG	Federico Martorell (from (Greece) Levadiakos)
—	MF	ESP	Ion Erice (from (Spain) Cádiz CF)
—	GK	CYP	Michalis Fani (from APOP Kinyras)
—	FW	CYP	Stamatis Pantos (loan return from APEP)
—	FW	CYP	Rafael Yiangoudakis (loan return from APEP)
—	DF	GRE	Nikos Katsavakis (from Anorthosis Famagusta)

Out: Note: Flags indicate national team as defined under FIFA eligibility rules; some limited exceptions apply. Players may hold more than one non-FIFA nationality.

No.	Pos.	Nation	Player
—	FW	ARG	Gastón Sangoy (to (Spain) Sporting de Gijón)
—	MF	SWE	Valentino Lai (loan return to (Denmark) Vejle Boldklub)
—	DF	BRA	Thiago Sales (loan return to (Brazil) Flamengo)
—	DF	BRA	Jovaldir Ferreira (released)
—	GK	GER	Nico Pellatz (to (Netherlands) ADO Den Haag)
—	MF	GER	Ioannis Masmanidis (to (Greece) Ethnikos Piraeus)
—	MF	ALB	Klodian Duro (to (Austria) LASK Linz)
—	MF	ISR	Moshe Mishaelof (to (Israel) Beitar Jerusalem)
—	FW	GHA	Junior Agogo (released)
—	DF	CYP	Giannis Demetriou (on loan to Doxa Katokopia)
—	MF	CYP	Christos Theophilou (to AEK Larnaca)
—	MF	CYP	Andreas Avraam (to AC Omonia)
—	MF	CRC	Gonzalo Segares (to (United States) Chicago Fire)
—	FW	CYP	Rafael Yiangoudakis (to APEP)
—	FW	CYP	Stamatis Pantos (to Akritas Chlorakas)

=== APOP Kinyras Peyias ===
In: Note: Flags indicate national team as defined under FIFA eligibility rules; some limited exceptions apply. Players may hold more than one non-FIFA nationality.

No.	Pos.	Nation	Player
—	DF	SEN	Gora Tall (loan return from (Romania) FC Steaua)
—	MF	CYP	Kyriacos Pavlou (from (Greece) Diagoras F.C.)
—	DF	RWA	Lewis Aniweta (from Nea Salamina)
—	DF	SEN	Mohamed Coly (from (Italy) Rodengo Calcio)
—	MF	GHA	Francis Boadi (from (Ghana) Great Olympics)
—	GK	URU	Damián Frascarelli (from (Uruguay) C.A. Cerro)
—	GK	CYP	Andreas Karseras (from Alki Larnaca)
—	MF	BEL	Kevin Van Dessel (from (Netherlands) VVV-Venlo)
—	MF	ESP	Carmelo (from (Spain) AD Alcorcón)
—	MF	ANG	Diangi Matusiwa (from (Netherlands) FC Den Bosch)
—	MF	ISR	Yehiel Tzagai (from (Israel) Hapoel Ashkelon)
—	GK	SRB	Zlatko Zečević (from (Serbia) FK Jagodina)
—	MF	CYP	Polis Avgousti (from Atromitos Yeroskipou)
—	DF	FRA	Kelly Berville (from (Portugal) Paços Ferreira)
—	MF	GHA	Imoro Lukman (from AEP Paphos)
—	DF	POR	Francisco Castro (from (Portugal) Moreirense)
—	FW	CIV	Franck Madou (free agent)
—	FW	GRE	Ioannis Sotiroglou (from (Greece) AO Chania)
—	FW	CYP	Alekos Alekou (from Ethnikos Achna)

Out: Note: Flags indicate national team as defined under FIFA eligibility rules; some limited exceptions apply. Players may hold more than one non-FIFA nationality.

No.	Pos.	Nation	Player
—	DF	FRA	Sébastien Grimaldi (released)
—	DF	GRE	Theodoros Galanis (to Atromitos Yeroskipou)
—	DF	GRE	Giannis Sfakianakis (to Atromitos Yeroskipou)
—	MF	BRA	Fillip (released)
—	MF	SLO	Luka Žinko (to (Russia) FC Amkar Perm)
—	DF	MAR	Samir Bengelloun (to (Bulgaria) Lokomotiv Plovdiv)
—	MF	SLO	Zoran Zeljkovič (to (Slovenia) NK Olimpija)
—	FW	CHI	Sebastián González (to (Mexico) Potros Neza)
—	MF	SLO	Dejan Grabič (released)
—	MF	HUN	Gábor Bardi (released)
—	DF	ARG	Martín Vitali (released)
—	GK	LTU	Šarūnas Jurevičius (to (Lithuania) FK Šiauliai)
—	GK	CYP	Marios Savva (to AEK Kouklion)
—	FW	CZE	Jiří Mašek (to Aris Limassol)
—	FW	CPV	José Semedo (to Apollon Limassol)
—	MF	POR	Paulo Costa (to Ermis Aradippou)
—	GK	CYP	Michalis Fani (to Apollon Limassol)

=== Doxa Katokopia ===
In: Note: Flags indicate national team as defined under FIFA eligibility rules; some limited exceptions apply. Players may hold more than one non-FIFA nationality.

No.	Pos.	Nation	Player
—	FW	ARG	Federico Amione (from Omonia Aradippou)
—	DF	BEL	Mike Mampuya (from (Netherlands) Helmond Sport)
—	DF	CYP	Periklis Moustakas (from ASIL)
—	GK	HUN	Zoltán Nagy (from Anorthosis Famagusta)
—	DF	CYP	Giannis Demetriou (on loan from Apollon Limassol)
—	MF	ARG	Gonzalo Gabrera (from (Argentina) Boca Juniors)
—	FW	ARG	Diego Galeano (on loan from (Argentina) Banfield)
—	MF	CYP	Charalambos Kyriakou (on loan from AC Omonia)
—	FW	POR	Élio (from (Portugal) Beira-Mar)
—	DF	GAM	Abdou Jammeh (from (Belgium) Lierse)
—	GK	HUN	Zsolt Posza (from (Greece) Ergotelis)
—	MF	ARG	Matías Escobar (on loan from (Turkey) Kayserispor)
—	DF	ESP	Paco (from (Spain) SD Huesca)
—	DF	CYP	Stelios Okkarides (from Olympiakos Nicosia)
—	DF	POR	Igor Pita (from (Portugal) C.D. Nacional)
—	MF	ALB	Geri Malaj (from (Spain) Deportivo de La Coruña B)
—	DF	FRA	Daniel Gomez (from (Netherlands) MVV)
—	FW	ZIM	Thabani Moyo (from (Zimbabwe) Njube Sundowns)
—	DF	ARG	Andrés Imperiale (from (Bolivia) Club Blooming)
—	MF	POR	Saavedra (on loan from AEK Larnaca)

Out: Note: Flags indicate national team as defined under FIFA eligibility rules; some limited exceptions apply. Players may hold more than one non-FIFA nationality.

No.	Pos.	Nation	Player
—	MF	POR	Margaça (to AEK Larnaca)
—	MF	POR	Saavedra (to AEK Larnaca)
—	MF	POR	Carlos André (to Olympiakos Nicosia)
—	DF	POR	Pedro Duarte (to Olympiakos Nicosia)
—	DF	BRA	Rodrigo Ribeiro (to Olympiakos Nicosia)
—	DF	CYP	Nikolas Nicolaou (to Olympiakos Nicosia)
—	MF	CYP	Kyriacos Polykarpou (to Olympiakos Nicosia)
—	DF	POR	Comboio (to Aris Limassol)
—	DF	CYP	Andreas Hadjigeorgiou (to Digenis Morphou)
—	GK	CYP	Giorgos Kakoullis (to Adonis Idaliou)
—	MF	MLT	Udo Nwoko (to (Iran) PAS Hamedan)
—	DF	POR	Mangualde (released)
—	GK	POR	Márcio Paiva (released)
—	MF	POR	Paulo Sereno (released)
—	DF	POR	Nuno Rodrigues (to Othellos Athienou)
—	FW	BRA	Roma (released)
—	FW	BRA	Gabriel Lima (released)
—	FW	ARG	Federico Amione (released)
—	DF	GAM	Abdou Jammeh (released)

=== Enosis Neon Paralimni ===
In: Note: Flags indicate national team as defined under FIFA eligibility rules; some limited exceptions apply. Players may hold more than one non-FIFA nationality.

No.	Pos.	Nation	Player
—	DF	BEL	Matthias Trenson (from (Belgium) Royal Antwerp)
—	GK	CYP	Panayiotis Charalambous (from Onisilos)
—	MF	BEL	Kristof Imschoot (from (Belgium) KV Mechelen)
—	FW	MKD	Krste Velkovski (from (Romania) Ceahlăul Piatra Neamţ)
—	MF	BRA	Alex da Siva (from (Brazil) Sport Club Barueri)
—	FW	SRB	Ivan Pejčić (from (Switzerland) FC Aarau)
—	FW	SCO	Mark Burchill (from (Scotland) Kilmarnock)
—	FW	SLE	Paul Kpaka (from (Belgium) Germinal Beerschot)

Out: Note: Flags indicate national team as defined under FIFA eligibility rules; some limited exceptions apply. Players may hold more than one non-FIFA nationality.

No.	Pos.	Nation	Player
—	FW	MKD	Ivan Tričkovski (loan return to (Serbia) Red Star Belgrade)
—	MF	BRA	Edmar (to Alki Larnaca)
—	GK	ARM	Armen Ambartsumyan (released)
—	DF	CYP	Nicolas Tziambouris (released)
—	DF	BIH	Ninoslav Milenković (to (China) Qingdao Jonoon)
—	MF	BEL	Rocky Peeters (loan return to (Belgium) Germinal Beerschot)
—	MF	EIR	Matthew Cassidy (to AEL Limassol)
—	FW	CYP	Christos Pierettis (to PAEEK FC)

=== Ermis Aradippou ===
In: Note: Flags indicate national team as defined under FIFA eligibility rules; some limited exceptions apply. Players may hold more than one non-FIFA nationality.

No.	Pos.	Nation	Player
—	MF	CYP	Nicos Papazachariou (loan return from Othellos Athienou)
—	MF	VEN	Andrés Rouga (from AEL Limassol)
—	MF	CYP	Andreas Pittaras (from Anorthosis Famagusta)
—	DF	ALB	Klodian Semina (from (Albania) KS Gramozi)
—	FW	CYP	Kyriacos Chailis (from AEP Paphos)
—	MF	BRA	Fabinho (from (Ukraine) Metalurh Donetsk)
—	MF	CYP	Antonis Katsis (on loan from AC Omonia)
—	DF	POR	Joel (from (Portugal) Leixões)
—	MF	POR	Paulo Costa (from APOP Kinyras)
—	DF	URU	Carlos García (from APEP)
—	MF	CYP	Giorgos Constanti (from APEP)
—	MF	PAN	Gabriel Gómez (from (Portugal) Belenenses)
—	MF	NGR	Azubuike Oliseh (from (Belgium) OH Leuven)
—	MF	CYP	Georgios Kolanis (from Olympiakos Nicosia)
—	FW	CYP	Andreas Papathanasiou (from Anorthosis Famagusta)

Out: Note: Flags indicate national team as defined under FIFA eligibility rules; some limited exceptions apply. Players may hold more than one non-FIFA nationality.

No.	Pos.	Nation	Player
—	FW	BRA	Weisheimer (released)
—	DF	POR	Serginho (to (Portugal) S.C. Freamunde)
—	MF	POR	Joca (released)
—	MF	MAR	Abdelkarim Kissi (to Alki Larnaca)
—	DF	GRE	Spyros Gogolos (to (Greece) Agrotikos Asteras)
—	FW	BRA	Jaílson (to (Portugal) Vitória Setúbal)
—	DF	CYP	Lambros Lambrou (to Nea Salamina)
—	MF	CYP	Marios Louka (to Nea Salamina)
—	MF	CYP	Nicos Papazachariou (to ASIL)
—	MF	VEN	Andrés Rouga (to (Venezuela) Deportivo Táchira)
—	DF	URU	Carlos García (to APEP)
—	DF	POR	Gilberto (released)
—	DF	ALB	Klodian Semina (to (Albania) KS Vllaznia)
—	MF	CYP	Andreas Pittaras (on loan to Chalkanoras Idaliou)

=== Ethnikos Achna ===
In: Note: Flags indicate national team as defined under FIFA eligibility rules; some limited exceptions apply. Players may hold more than one non-FIFA nationality.

No.	Pos.	Nation	Player
—	FW	CYP	Elias Vattis (from ASIL)
—	FW	BIH	Slaviša Dugić (from Aris Limassol)
—	FW	BRA	Gelson (from APEP)
—	DF	SRB	Predrag Ocokoljić (from Anorthosis Famagusta)
—	MF	AFG	Djelaludin Sharityar (from APEP)
—	DF	CRO	Vanja Džaferović (from (Bulgaria) Lokomotiv Sofia)
—	FW	MKD	Filip Ivanovski (from (Poland) Polonia Warsaw)
—	MF	MKD	Stojan Ignatov (from (Romania) Politehnica Iaşi)
—	GK	CZE	Milan Zahálka (from Omonia Aradippou)
—	DF	SRB	Ivica Milutinović (from (Serbia) FK Banat Zrenjanin)

Out: Note: Flags indicate national team as defined under FIFA eligibility rules; some limited exceptions apply. Players may hold more than one non-FIFA nationality.

No.	Pos.	Nation	Player
—	FW	SRB	Miljan Mrdaković (loan return to Apollon Limassol)
—	FW	BRA	David (to Aris Limassol)
—	MF	ESP	José Antonio Villanueva (to (Spain) Orihuela CF)
—	DF	POR	João Pedro (to (Portugal) Gil Vicente)
—	MF	CYP	Panayiotis Onisiforou (to Nea Salamina)
—	MF	SLE	Sahr Lahai (to Onisilos)
—	MF	MKD	Slavčo Georgievski (to (Azerbaijan) Neftchi Baku)
—	GK	CYP	Demetris Stylianou (to Aris Limassol)
—	FW	CYP	Alekos Alekou (to APOP Kinyras)
—	FW	SRB	Milan Belić (to Nea Salamina)
—	DF	CYP	Christos Siailis (to Anagennisi Dherynia)
—	DF	CRO	Vanja Džaferović (released due to injury)
—	DF	BRA	Marcelo (released)
—	MF	SRB	Zoran Stjepanović (to PAEEK FC)

=== Olympiakos Nicosia ===
In: Note: Flags indicate national team as defined under FIFA eligibility rules; some limited exceptions apply. Players may hold more than one non-FIFA nationality.

No.	Pos.	Nation	Player
—	MF	POR	Carlos André (from Doxa Katokopia)
—	DF	POR	Pedro Duarte (from Doxa Katokopia)
—	DF	BRA	Rodrigo Ribeiro (from Doxa Katokopia)
—	DF	CYP	Nikolas Nicolaou (from Doxa Katokopia)
—	MF	CYP	Kyriacos Polykarpou (from Doxa Katokopia)
—	MF	BRA	Mércio (from (Portugal) Trofense)
—	MF	POR	Hélder Sousa (from (Portugal) Trofense)
—	DF	BRA	Carlos André (from (Portugal) CD Tondela)
—	FW	BRA	Brasília (from (Poland) Odra Wodzisław)
—	DF	FRA	Kevin Hatchi (from (Romania) Astra Ploieşti)
—	MF	POR	Paulinho (from (Portugal) Trofense)
—	FW	POR	João Paulo (from (Portugal) Leixões)
—	MF	POR	David Caiado (from (Portugal) Trofense)
—	FW	CMR	Emmanuel Kenmogne (from (Belgium) Royal Antwerp)
—	FW	NGR	Chidi Onyemah (from (Portugal) Rio Ave F.C.)
—	GK	ALB	Arjan Beqaj (from Anorthosis Famagusta)
—	DF	CYP	Panayiotis Panayiotou (from APOEL)
—	GK	LTU	Ernestas Šetkus (from (Lithuania) Žalgiris Vilnius)
—	DF	POR	Júnior (from AEL Limassol)
—	MF	ANG	Dédé (free agent)
—	DF	BRA	Fernando de Abreu (from (Slovenia) Olimpija Ljubljana)

Out: Note: Flags indicate national team as defined under FIFA eligibility rules; some limited exceptions apply. Players may hold more than one non-FIFA nationality.

No.	Pos.	Nation	Player
—	DF	CYP	Sotiris Ptinis (to Chalkanoras Idaliou)
—	DF	CYP	Stelios Longras (to Chalkanoras Idaliou)
—	FW	POR	Pedras (to (Portugal) F.C. Tirsense)
—	MF	CYP	Demetris Kyriakou (loan return to APOEL F.C.)
—	MF	GER	Heiner Backhaus (to APEP)
—	MF	MOZ	Fumo (released)
—	DF	CYP	Stelios Okkarides (to Doxa Katokopias)
—	MF	COD	Jeff Tutuana (released)
—	DF	CYP	Demetris Daskalakis (to PAEEK FC)
—	MF	CYP	Marios Themistokleous (to Chalkanoras Idaliou)
—	DF	CYP	Christos Efthymiou (to Adonis Idaliou)
—	DF	CYP	Giorgos Georgiades (to Chalkanoras Idaliou)
—	MF	CYP	Nikolas Oratiou (to PAEEK FC)
—	MF	FRA	Guillaume Beuzelin (released)
—	MF	CYP	Georgios Kolanis (to Ermis Aradippou)
—	DF	CYP	Giorgos Costa (to Ethnikos Assia)
—	FW	BUL	Georgi Kakalov (loan return to (Belarus) Dinamo Minsk)
—	MF	POR	Ricardo Nunes (to (Portugal) C.D. Trofense)
—	GK	GRE	Dimitris Rizos (released)
—	GK	CYP	Evagoras Hadjifrangiskou (to Nea Salamina)
—	FW	CYP	Georgios Kolokoudias (to Digenis Morphou)
—	DF	FRA	Kevin Hatchi (to Ermis Aradippou)

=== Omonia ===
In: Note: Flags indicate national team as defined under FIFA eligibility rules; some limited exceptions apply. Players may hold more than one non-FIFA nationality.

No.	Pos.	Nation	Player
—	FW	BFA	Abdul Diallo (loan return from AEP Paphos)
—	GK	CYP	Nikolas Asprogenis (loan return from Aris Limassol)
—	FW	ARG	Francisco Aguirre (loan return from Aris Limassol)
—	MF	CYP	Feidias Panayiotou (loan return from Alki Larnaca)
—	DF	ISR	Yuval Spungin (from (Israel) Maccabi Tel Aviv)
—	GK	SRB	Dragoslav Jevrić (from (Israel) Maccabi Petah Tikva)
—	MF	ESP	José Manuel Rueda (from (Spain) Barcelona Atlètic)
—	DF	ESP	Víctor Espasandín (from (Spain) Barcelona Atlètic)
—	DF	ESP	Iago Bouzón (from (Spain) Recreativo Huelva)
—	FW	COD	Lomana LuaLua (from (Greece) Olympiacos)
—	MF	CYP	Andreas Avraam (from Apollon Limassol)

Out: Note: Flags indicate national team as defined under FIFA eligibility rules; some limited exceptions apply. Players may hold more than one non-FIFA nationality.

No.	Pos.	Nation	Player
—	DF	BRA	Kaká (loan return to (Germany) Hertha BSC)
—	GK	CYP	Nikolas Asprogenis (on loan to Anorthosis Famagusta)
—	FW	ARG	Francisco Aguirre (to (Switzerland) FC Locarno)
—	FW	BFA	Abdul Diallo (to (Greece) Panthrakikos)
—	DF	CYP	Paraskevas Christou (to Alki Larnaca)
—	FW	POL	Maciej Żurawski (to (Poland) Wisła Kraków)
—	MF	GRE	Anastasios Kyriakos (to (Greece) PAS Giannina)
—	GK	MLI	Mahamadou Sidibe (released)
—	MF	SLO	Anton Žlogar (to Alki Larnaca)
—	MF	CYP	Charalambos Kyriakou (on loan to Doxa Katokopia)
—	MF	CYP	Antonis Katsis (on loan to Ermis Aradippou)
—	MF	GRE	Christos Patsatzoglou (to (Greece) AEK Athens)
—	GK	GRE	Stefanos Kotsolis (released)

== Cypriot Second Division ==
=== Adonis Idaliou ===
In: Note: Flags indicate national team as defined under FIFA eligibility rules; some limited exceptions apply. Players may hold more than one non-FIFA nationality.

No.	Pos.	Nation	Player
—	GK	CYP	Giorgos Kakoullis (from Doxa Katokopia)
—	MF	CPV	Spencer (from Digenis Morphou)
—	FW	CYP	Pantelis Tavrou (from Chalkanoras Idaliou)
—	DF	CYP	Savvas Parmakis (from Chalkanoras Idaliou)
—	FW	POR	Ângelo (from PAEEK FC)
—	DF	CYP	Giannis Demosthenous (from Atromitos Yeroskipou)
—	DF	CYP	Giorgos Ioannou (from PAEEK FC)

Out: Note: Flags indicate national team as defined under FIFA eligibility rules; some limited exceptions apply. Players may hold more than one non-FIFA nationality.

No.	Pos.	Nation	Player
—	FW	CYP	Makis Sergidis (to ASIL)
—	MF	CYP	Christos Vassiliou (released)
—	FW	CYP	Costas Constantinou (to Digenis Morphou)

=== Akritas Chlorakas ===
In: Note: Flags indicate national team as defined under FIFA eligibility rules; some limited exceptions apply. Players may hold more than one non-FIFA nationality.

No.	Pos.	Nation	Player
—	FW	CMR	Jaspa Dipa (from Frenaros FC 2000)
—	DF	NGR	George Abbey (free agent)
—	DF	POR	Miguel Pedro (from ENTHOI Lakatamias)
—	MF	ARG	Milton Müller (from (Greece) AEL)
—	GK	POR	Zé Eduardo (from (Portugal) F.C. Penafiel)
—	MF	CPV	Mikó (from (Portugal) Aljustrelense)
—	FW	POR	Milton (from AEK Larnaca)
—	FW	CYP	Stamatis Pantos (from Apollon Limassol)

Out: Note: Flags indicate national team as defined under FIFA eligibility rules; some limited exceptions apply. Players may hold more than one non-FIFA nationality.

No.	Pos.	Nation	Player
—	MF	POR	Manuel Telmo (to PAEEK FC)
—	FW	NED	Dion Esajas (to PAEEK FC)
—	DF	POL	Dominik Bednarczyk (to Onisilos)
—	FW	MKD	Vasko Georgiev (released)
—	MF	POR	Lopo (to Othellos Athienou)
—	GK	LAT	Andrejs Pavlovs (to AEP Paphos)
—	DF	CYP	Costas Metaxas (released)
—	MF	ARG	Milton Müller (released)
—	MF	HUN	Gábor Nagy (released)

=== Anagennisi Deryneia ===
In: Note: Flags indicate national team as defined under FIFA eligibility rules; some limited exceptions apply. Players may hold more than one non-FIFA nationality.

No.	Pos.	Nation	Player
—	MF	CYP	Panayiotis Kosma (from Omonia Aradippou)
—	DF	CYP	Panayiotis Dionysiou (from AO Ayia Napa)
—	FW	CYP	Costas Elia (from ASIL)
—	MF	CYP	Charalambos Loizou (from Ermis Aradippou)
—	MF	POR	Marco Freitas (from Frenaros FC 2000)

Out: Note: Flags indicate national team as defined under FIFA eligibility rules; some limited exceptions apply. Players may hold more than one non-FIFA nationality.

No.	Pos.	Nation	Player
—	DF	BUL	Kristian Uzunov (to (Bulgaria) Chernomorets Burgas)
—	MF	ENG	Emile Aiken (to (England) Grays Athletic)
—	FW	CYP	Christos Karapashis (released)
—	MF	CYP	Costas Loizou (released)

=== APEP Pitsilia ===
In: Note: Flags indicate national team as defined under FIFA eligibility rules; some limited exceptions apply. Players may hold more than one non-FIFA nationality.

No.	Pos.	Nation	Player
—	GK	SCO	Derek Soutar (from (Scotland) Dundee F.C.)
—	DF	CYP	Yiannis Theofanous (loan return from Frenaros FC 2000)
—	GK	CYP	Simos Tsiakkas (from Othellos Athienou)
—	MF	GAM	Edrissa Sonko (from (England) Hereford United)
—	FW	URU	Pablo Di Fiori (from (Uruguay) Juventud de Las Piedras)
—	MF	CYP	Christos Nicolaou (free agent)
—	MF	SLE	Andrew Allie (on loan from AEL Limassol)
—	MF	CYP	Rafael Panayiotou (on loan from AEL Limassol)
—	FW	COD	Papi Kimoto (from Atromitos Yeroskipou)
—	MF	GRE	Christos Oxyzoglou (from (Greece) Rodos F.C.)
—	MF	GER	Heiner Backhaus (from Olympiakos Nicosia)
—	MF	FRA	Franck Akamba (from (France) AS Cherbourg)
—	DF	CYP	Andreas Iacovou (from ENAD Polis Chrysochous)
—	DF	CZE	Michal Ščasný (from (Slovakia) Tatran Prešov)
—	DF	CZE	Radek Pilař (from (Czech Republic) Zenit Čáslav)
—	FW	POL	Janusz Surdykowski (from (Poland) Górnik Łęczna)
—	DF	FRA	Alain Logombe (from (England) Grays Athletic)
—	FW	CYP	Rafael Yiangoudakis (from Apollon Limassol)
—	DF	URU	Carlos García (from Ermis Aradippou)

Out: Note: Flags indicate national team as defined under FIFA eligibility rules; some limited exceptions apply. Players may hold more than one non-FIFA nationality.

No.	Pos.	Nation	Player
—	FW	CYP	Charalambos Pittakas (loan return to Alki Larnaca)
—	GK	ITA	Luigi Gennamo (to (Greece) Panetolikos)
—	MF	POR	João Paulo (to Aris Limassol)
—	FW	BRA	Gelson (to Ethnikos Achna)
—	DF	ESP	Jorge Prado (to Atromitos Yeroskipou)
—	MF	AFG	Djelaludin Sharityar (to Ethnikos Achna)
—	MF	CYP	Nicos Kanettis (to N & S Erimis)
—	DF	URU	Carlos García (to Ermis Aradippou)
—	FW	ARG	Francisco Guerrero (released)
—	MF	CYP	Giorgos Constanti (to Ermis Aradippou)
—	DF	SUI	Kiliann Witschi (to (Switzerland) FC Chiasso)
—	FW	GER	Fabian Wilhelmsen (released)
—	GK	HUN	Dániel Totka (released)
—	DF	ITA	Pasquale Sbarra (to (Switzerland) FC Winterthur)
—	MF	IRI	Ali Parhizi (released)
—	FW	CYP	Stamatis Pantos (loan return to Apollon Limassol)
—	FW	CYP	Rafael Yiangoudakis (loan return to Apollon Limassol)
—	FW	KOS	Sokol Maliqi (to (Switzerland) FC Kosova Zürich)
—	MF	ALB	Clirim Kryeziu (released)
—	DF	ENG	Marvin Hamilton (released)

=== Aris Limassol ===
In: Note: Flags indicate national team as defined under FIFA eligibility rules; some limited exceptions apply. Players may hold more than one non-FIFA nationality.

No.	Pos.	Nation	Player
—	DF	BEN	John Glélé (free agent)
—	MF	POR	João Paulo (from APEP)
—	DF	POR	Comboio (from Doxa Katokopia)
—	MF	SWE	Björn Morgan Enqvist (from (Greece) Veria F.C.)
—	MF	CYP	Christos Charalampous (from AEL Limassol)
—	FW	NGR	David Opara (from AEK Larnaca)
—	MF	CYP	Adamos Efstathiou (from AEK Larnaca)
—	FW	CZE	Jiří Mašek (from APOP Kinyras)
—	FW	BRA	David (from Ethnikos Achna)
—	GK	CYP	Demetris Stylianou (from Ethnikos Achna)
—	FW	POL	Łukasz Sosin (from (Greece) Kavala F.C.)
—	FW	BEL	Jorrit D'Haeseleer (from (Belgium) Standaard Wetteren)

Out: Note: Flags indicate national team as defined under FIFA eligibility rules; some limited exceptions apply. Players may hold more than one non-FIFA nationality.

No.	Pos.	Nation	Player
—	MF	SLE	Julius Woobay (loan return to (Romania) Universitatea Craiova)
—	GK	CYP	Nikolas Asprogenis (loan return to AC Omonia)
—	FW	ARG	Francisco Aguirre (loan return to AC Omonia)
—	DF	GER	Marc Eberle (to (South Africa) Mpumalanga Black Aces)
—	FW	SRB	Saša Stojanović (to (Israel) Hapoel Haifa)
—	MF	HUN	Gábor Korolovszky (to (Hungary) Szombathelyi Haladás)
—	FW	BIH	Slaviša Dugić (to Ethnikos Achna)
—	DF	CYP	Filippos Filippou (to Chalkanoras Idaliou)
—	MF	GRE	Nikos Kounenakis (to (United States) Kansas City Wizards)
—	MF	GRE	Giorgos Vourexakis (released)
—	MF	BRA	Marcio Ferreira (released)
—	DF	POR	Bruno Pinheiro (to (Poland) Widzew Łódź)
—	MF	LAT	Vitālijs Rečickis (released)
—	MF	ARG	Sebastián Salomón (released)
—	FW	ROU	Adrian Mihalcea (to (Romania) Astra Ploieşti)
—	FW	CZE	Jiří Mašek (released)

=== ASIL ===
In: Note: Flags indicate national team as defined under FIFA eligibility rules; some limited exceptions apply. Players may hold more than one non-FIFA nationality.

No.	Pos.	Nation	Player
—	MF	GRE	Spiros Kontopoulos (from Digenis Oroklinis)
—	MF	CYP	Nicos Papazachariou (from Ermis Aradippou)
—	MF	CYP	Andreas Stylianou (from Othellos Athienou)
—	MF	CYP	Demetris Sergiou (from Omonia Aradippou)
—	MF	CYP	Panos Demetriou (from Ethnikos Assia)
—	FW	CYP	Makis Sergidis (from Adonis Idaliou)
—	DF	CYP	Giorgos Odysseos (from ENTHOI Lakatamias)
—	FW	CYP	Michalis Iona (from ENTHOI Lakatamias)
—	MF	CYP	Kyriakos Kyriakou (from Nea Salamina)
—	MF	CYP	Marios Georgiou (from AEK Larnaca)
—	FW	GRE	Thanasis Kavallaris (on loan from AEK Larnaca)
—	MF	CYP	Alexandros Kanari (on loan from Alki Larnaca)

Out: Note: Flags indicate national team as defined under FIFA eligibility rules; some limited exceptions apply. Players may hold more than one non-FIFA nationality.

No.	Pos.	Nation	Player
—	MF	CYP	Andreas Pittaras (loan return to Anothosis Famagusta)
—	MF	CYP	Elias Vattis (to Ethnikos Achna)
—	GK	SVK	Daniel Ondrejicka (released)
—	FW	NGR	Andrew Esealuka (to Chalkanoras Idaliou)
—	MF	ROU	Robert Neagoe (released)
—	MF	CYP	Spyros Machattos (released)
—	DF	CYP	Periklis Moustakas (to Doxa Katokopia)
—	MF	POR	Dani Rodrigues (to Atromitos Yeroskipou)

=== Atromitos Yeroskipou ===
In: Note: Flags indicate national team as defined under FIFA eligibility rules; some limited exceptions apply. Players may hold more than one non-FIFA nationality.

No.	Pos.	Nation	Player
—	FW	CYP	Charalambos Pittakas (from Alki Larnaca)
—	FW	SEN	Ismail Ba (from AEP Paphos)
—	MF	POR	Dani Rodrigues (from ASIL)
—	DF	GRE	Demetris Papastergiou (from (Greece) Niki Volou)
—	FW	CYP	Aggelos Perikleous (on loan from AEL Limassol)
—	MF	CYP	Giorgos Georgiou (from AEP Paphos)
—	DF	GRE	Giannis Sfakianakis (from APOP Kinyras)
—	DF	GRE	Theodoros Galanis (from APOP Kinyras)
—	DF	ESP	Jorge Prado (from APEP)
—	GK	LAT	Jevgēņijs Sazonovs (from (Latvia) FC Tranzit)
—	FW	ARG	Diego Herrera Gaston (from Alki Larnaca)
—	MF	LAT	Viktors Morozs (from (Bulgaria) CSKA Sofia)
—	FW	HAI	Abel Thermeus (free agent)
—	MF	LAT	Aleksandrs Solovjovs (from (Latvia) FK Ventspils)

Out: Note: Flags indicate national team as defined under FIFA eligibility rules; some limited exceptions apply. Players may hold more than one non-FIFA nationality.

No.	Pos.	Nation	Player
—	MF	CYP	Efthymios Panayiotou (to N & S Erimis)
—	FW	BRA	Renato Bauer (released)
—	DF	POR	Pedro Pereira (released)
—	FW	CIV	Axel Gosse (released)
—	FW	POR	Sérgio Grilo (to (Portugal) Moreirense)
—	MF	SRB	Aleksandar Mutavdžić (released)
—	MF	NED	Regilio Seedorf (released)
—	DF	CYP	Giannis Demosthenous (to Adonis Idaliou)
—	MF	CYP	Polis Avgousti (to APOP Kinyras)
—	FW	COD	Papi Kimoto (to APEP)
—	MF	FRA	Samy Mawéné (to (France) Paris FC)
—	MF	POR	Dani Rodrigues (released)

=== Chalkanoras Idaliou ===
In: Note: Flags indicate national team as defined under FIFA eligibility rules; some limited exceptions apply. Players may hold more than one non-FIFA nationality.

No.	Pos.	Nation	Player
—	DF	CYP	Sotiris Ptinis (from Olympiakos Nicosia)
—	MF	CYP	Marios Themistokleous (from Olympiakos Nicosia)
—	DF	CYP	Stelios Longras (from Olympiakos Nicosia)
—	FW	NGR	Andrew Esealuka (from ASIL)
—	MF	ZIM	Shingayi Kaondera (from Digenis Morphou)
—	MF	CYP	Panayiotis Fasouliotis (free agent)
—	DF	CYP	Filippos Filippou (from Aris Limassol)
—	DF	BUL	Orlin Borislavov (from Frenaros FC 2000)
—	DF	CYP	Theofanis Lagos (from MEAP Nisou)
—	GK	CYP	Michalis Kokkinos (from Atromitos Yeroskipou)
—	DF	CYP	Iacovos Tsolakides (from Alki Larnaca)
—	FW	GEO	Klimenti Tsitaishvili (from Nea Salamina)
—	FW	CYP	Andreas Pittaras (on loan from Ermis Aradippou)

Out: Note: Flags indicate national team as defined under FIFA eligibility rules; some limited exceptions apply. Players may hold more than one non-FIFA nationality.

No.	Pos.	Nation	Player
—	FW	CYP	Pantelis Tavrou (to Adonis Idaliou)
—	DF	CYP	Savvas Parmakis (to Adonis Idaliou)
—	MF	CYP	Neoptolemos Loutsios (to PAEEK FC)
—	FW	NGR	Andrew Esealuka (released)
—	MF	CYP	Panayiotis Fasouliotis (released)

=== Digenis Akritas Morphou ===
In: Note: Flags indicate national team as defined under FIFA eligibility rules; some limited exceptions apply. Players may hold more than one non-FIFA nationality.

No.	Pos.	Nation	Player
—	GK	BRA	Alê (from (Portugal) Portimonense)
—	MF	POR	Filipe Falardo (from Atlético Clube de Portugal)
—	DF	SVK	Peter Kiška (from (Slovakia) FK Slovan Duslo Šaľa)
—	MF	POR	Bruno Bolinhas (on loan from (Portugal) Sporting Lisbon)
—	MF	POR	Ricardo Fernandes (on loan from (England) Chelsea Reserves)
—	MF	MDA	Roman Bolbocian (from (Bulgaria) Lokomotiv Plovdiv)
—	DF	GRE	Demetris Ignatiadis (from (Greece) Platanias F.C.)
—	DF	CYP	Stavros Stavrou (from MEAP Nisou)
—	DF	POL	Przemysław Otuszewski (from (Poland) Warta Poznań)
—	FW	CYP	Costas Constantinou (from Adonis Idaliou)
—	DF	CYP	Demetris Kattos (from Ethnikos Assia)
—	MF	CYP	Andreas Hadjigeorgiou (from Doxa Katokopias)
—	FW	SVK	Róbert Ujčík (from (Czech Republic) FC Vítkovice)
—	FW	CYP	Michalis Paschali (from APOEL II)
—	MF	POL	Łukasz Masłowski (from (Poland) Wisła Płock)
—	FW	CYP	Georgios Kolokoudias (from Olympiakos Nicosia)
—	MF	POR	Eugenio Neves (from AEK Larnaca)
—	DF	CYP	Loukas Stylianou (from Anorthosis Famagusta)

Out: Note: Flags indicate national team as defined under FIFA eligibility rules; some limited exceptions apply. Players may hold more than one non-FIFA nationality.

No.	Pos.	Nation	Player
—	DF	HUN	Ákos Seper (to Omonia Aradippou)
—	MF	BRA	Paulinho Carioca (released)
—	GK	GRE	Angelos Georgiou (released)
—	FW	CYP	Sozos Fasouliotis (to Othellos Athienou)
—	MF	ZIM	Shingayi Kaondera (to Chalkanoras Idaliou)
—	MF	MAR	Hamid Rhanem (released)
—	MF	CYP	Christos Panayiotou (released)
—	MF	CPV	Spencer (to Adonis Idaliou)
—	MF	CYP	Panayiotis Panayiotou (loan return to APOEL)
—	DF	CYP	Lazaros Iakovou (to Spartakos Kitiou)
—	DF	CYP	Charis Drakos (released)
—	DF	CYP	Grigoris Grigoriou (released)
—	FW	LAT	Aleksejs Koļesņikovs (to Othellos Athienou)
—	FW	SRB	Nemanja Čorović (released)

=== Nea Salamina ===
In: Note: Flags indicate national team as defined under FIFA eligibility rules; some limited exceptions apply. Players may hold more than one non-FIFA nationality.

No.	Pos.	Nation	Player
—	MF	CYP	Marios Louka (from Ermis Aradippou)
—	GK	BIH	Dejan Milič (from (Slovenia) NK Primorje)
—	DF	SLO	Jan Pahor (from (Slovenia) NK Livar)
—	MF	CYP	Antonis Panagi (from AEK Larnaca)
—	MF	CYP	Panayiotis Onisiforou (from Ethnikos Achna)
—	MF	NGR	Joshua Izuchukwu (from AEK Larnaca)
—	GK	CYP	Evagoras Hadjifrangiskou (from Olympiakos Nicosia)
—	MF	CZE	Lukáš Vaculík (from (Czech Republic) Viktoria Žižkov)
—	FW	GHA	Chris Dickson (from (England) Charlton Athletic)
—	DF	CYP	Lambros Lambrou (from Ermis Aradippou)
—	FW	GER	Joseph Laumann (from (Germany) MSV Duisburg II)
—	FW	SRB	Milan Belić (from Ethnikos Achna)
—	MF	GRE	Christos Tripsas (from (Netherlands) FC Groningen II)
—	MF	GRE	Stavros Tsoukalas (from (Greece) PAOK)

Out: Note: Flags indicate national team as defined under FIFA eligibility rules; some limited exceptions apply. Players may hold more than one non-FIFA nationality.

No.	Pos.	Nation	Player
—	MF	ISR	Baruch Dego (to Apollon Limassol)
—	DF	RWA	Lewis Aniweta (to APOP Kinyras)
—	DF	FRA	Jérémie Rodrigues (to (Bulgaria) Lokomotiv Plovdiv)
—	MF	MOZ	Genito (to (Israel) Sektzia Nes Tziona)
—	FW	GEO	Klimenti Tsitaishvili (to Chalkanoras Idaliou)
—	DF	ARG	Fernando Ávalos (released)
—	DF	POR	Vítor Vinha (to (Portugal) C.D. Aves)
—	MF	CYP	Stefanos Voskaridis (to AEP Paphos)
—	DF	FRA	Willy Fondja (released)
—	GK	BRA	Sergio Vitori (released)
—	GK	CRO	Sandro Tomić (released)
—	GK	VEN	Rafael Ponzo (to Ermis Aradippou)
—	DF	FRA	Fayçal Nini (released)
—	DF	CYP	Nikos Nicolaou (released)
—	MF	CYP	Kyriakos Kyriakou (to ASIL)
—	FW	CYP	Andreas Kyprianou (to Anorthosis Famagusta)

=== Omonia Aradippou ===
In: Note: Flags indicate national team as defined under FIFA eligibility rules; some limited exceptions apply. Players may hold more than one non-FIFA nationality.

No.	Pos.	Nation	Player
—	MF	ROU	Marian Galbenu (loan return from Spartakos Kitiou)
—	DF	HUN	Ákos Seper (from Digenis Morphou)
—	FW	ZIM	Edward Mashinya (from Onisilos)
—	DF	CYP	Aristos Aristodimou (from ENTHOI Lakatamias)
—	GK	CZE	Libor Vacho (from ENTHOI Lakatamias)
—	MF	BEN	Florent Raimy (from (Malta) Marsaxlokk)
—	FW	BRA	Ricardo Malzoni (from (Brazil) Corinthians SP)
—	FW	CYP	Kyriakos Panteli (from AEK Larnaca)

Out: Note: Flags indicate national team as defined under FIFA eligibility rules; some limited exceptions apply. Players may hold more than one non-FIFA nationality.

No.	Pos.	Nation	Player
—	MF	GRE	Georgios Kostis (to Ethnikos Assia)
—	GK	CZE	Milan Zahálka (to Ethnikos Achna)
—	FW	ARG	Federico Amione (to Doxa Katokopia)
—	MF	BUL	Konstantin Mirchev (released)
—	FW	BUL	Kiril Aleksandrov (released)
—	MF	CYP	Panayiotis Kosma (to Anagennisi Dherynia)
—	MF	CYP	Demetris Sergiou (to ASIL)

=== Onisilos Sotira ===
In: Note: Flags indicate national team as defined under FIFA eligibility rules; some limited exceptions apply. Players may hold more than one non-FIFA nationality.

No.	Pos.	Nation	Player
—	FW	CYP	Martinos Solomou (from MEAP Nisou)
—	DF	CYP	Costas Pouros (from Alki Larnaca)
—	MF	CYP	Tomis Chrysostomou (from ASIL)
—	GK	SVK	Peter Kostolani (from Frenaros FC 2000)
—	DF	POL	Dominik Bednarczyk (from Akritas Chloraka)
—	MF	SLE	Sahr Lahai (from Ethnikos Achna)
—	DF	CYP	Apostolos Michael (from MEAP Nisou)

Out: Note: Flags indicate national team as defined under FIFA eligibility rules; some limited exceptions apply. Players may hold more than one non-FIFA nationality.

No.	Pos.	Nation	Player
—	FW	ZIM	Edward Mashinya (to Omonia Aradippou)
—	FW	POR	Fausto Lourenco (to (Switzerland) Neuchâtel Xamax)
—	GK	CYP	Panayiotis Charalambous (to Enosis Neon Paralimni)
—	DF	SLO	Sebastjan Berko (to (Slovenia) NK Rudar Velenje)
—	MF	POR	Vítor Pereira (released)
—	MF	NED	Robin Muller van Moppes (released)
—	MF	ENG	Alistair Slowe (to (England) Northampton Town)

=== Othellos Athienou F.C. ===
In: Note: Flags indicate national team as defined under FIFA eligibility rules; some limited exceptions apply. Players may hold more than one non-FIFA nationality.

No.	Pos.	Nation	Player
—	GK	CYP	Fredy Tarwireyi (from MEAP Nisou)
—	FW	CYP	Christos Xenofontos (on loan from AEK Larnaca)
—	GK	POL	Łukasz Gieresz (from (Poland) Motor Lublin)
—	FW	CYP	Sozos Fasouliotis (from Digenis Morphou)
—	MF	POR	Lopo (from Akritas Chloraka)
—	FW	LAT	Aleksejs Koļesņikovs (from Digenis Morphou)
—	DF	POR	Nuno Rodrigues (from Doxa Katokopias)
—	FW	CYP	Savvas Pikramenos (from PAEEK FC)

Out: Note: Flags indicate national team as defined under FIFA eligibility rules; some limited exceptions apply. Players may hold more than one non-FIFA nationality.

No.	Pos.	Nation	Player
—	FW	LAT	Gatis Kalniņš (to (Latvia) FK Jūrmala-VV)
—	MF	CYP	Andreas Stylianou (to ASIL)
—	MF	CYP	Nicos Papazachariou (loan return to Ermis Aradippou)
—	MF	POR	Djibril Djaló (released)
—	FW	GAM	Jatto Ceesay (to AO Ayia Napa)
—	FW	POL	Andrzej Ignachuk (released)
—	GK	CYP	Simos Tsiakkas (to APEP)
—	DF	CYP	Stefanos Georgiou (released)

=== PAEEK FC ===
In: Note: Flags indicate national team as defined under FIFA eligibility rules; some limited exceptions apply. Players may hold more than one non-FIFA nationality.

No.	Pos.	Nation	Player
—	MF	GBS	Rodilson (from Ayia Napa)
—	DF	POR	Hugo Simoes (from Ayia Napa)
—	MF	CYP	Christos Panayiotou (from Digenis Morphou)
—	MF	CYP	Nicolas Oratiou (from Olympiakos Nicosia)
—	MF	CYP	Neoptolemos Loutsios (from Chalkanoras Idaliou)
—	MF	BUL	Iliya Tafrov (from (Bulgaria) Pirin GD)
—	FW	BUL	Mario Metushev (from (Bulgaria) Pirin GD)
—	FW	ITA	Giuseppe Ricciardi (from Alki Larnaca)
—	MF	SRB	Zoran Stjepanović (from Ethnikos Achna)
—	GK	CYP	Michalis Morfis (from APOEL)

Out: Note: Flags indicate national team as defined under FIFA eligibility rules; some limited exceptions apply. Players may hold more than one non-FIFA nationality.

No.	Pos.	Nation	Player
—	FW	BRA	Leo Miranda (released)
—	DF	SEN	Andreas Manga (released)
—	MF	CYP	Nicolas Kissonergis (released)
—	MF	FRA	Tony Lambardie (released)
—	FW	POR	Ângelo (to Adonis Idaliou)
—	MF	GBS	Rodilson (released)
—	GK	BUL	Abdi Abdikov (released)
