= List of Cypriot football transfers winter 2009–10 =

This is a list of Cypriot football transfers for the 2009–10 winter transfer window by club. Only transfers of clubs in the Cypriot First Division and Cypriot Second Division are included.

The winter transfer window opened on 1 January 2010, although a few transfers took place prior to that date. The window closed at midnight on 31 January 2010. Players without a club may join one at any time, either during or in between transfer windows.

== Marfin Laiki League ==
=== AEL Limassol ===
In: Note: Flags indicate national team as defined under FIFA eligibility rules; some limited exceptions apply. Players may hold more than one non-FIFA nationality.

No.	Pos.	Nation	Player
—	GK	SVK	Kamil Čontofalský (from (Russia) FC Zenit)
—	MF	POR	Ricardo Fernandes (from Anorthosis)
—	MF	MKD	Vlatko Grozdanoski (from (Serbia) FK Vojvodina)
—	MF	SVK	Balázs Borbély (from (Romania) FC Timişoara)
—	MF	CYP	Alexandros Garpozis (from Anorthosis)

Out:

No.	Pos.	Nation	Player
—	GK	CYP	Panos Constantinou (released)
—	MF	CYP	Simos Krassas (to Alki Larnaca)
—	MF	BRA	André Caldeira (to (Israel) Hapoel Ramat Gan)
—	DF	CYP	Stelios Parpas (on loan to (Romania) FC Steaua)
—	DF	CYP	Pantelis Pitsillos (on loan from AEL Limassol)

=== AEP Paphos ===
In:

No.	Pos.	Nation	Player
—	MF	ESP	Juan Bezares (from (Spain) Unión Estepona)
—	MF	ISR	Moshe Mishaelof (on loan from Apollon Limassol)
—	FW	BFA	Abdul Diallo (on loan from AC Omonia)
—	MF	BRA	Eduardo Marques (from Aris Limassol)

Out:

No.	Pos.	Nation	Player
—	FW	GEO	Irakliy Geperidze (released)
—	MF	ARM	Romik Khachatryan (released)
—	MF	POR	José Calado (released)
—	FW	BRA	Gabriel Lima (to Doxa Katokopia)

=== Anorthosis ===
In:

No.	Pos.	Nation	Player
—	MF	SCO	Mark Fotheringham (from (Scotland) Dundee United)
—	MF	POR	Miguel Pedro (from (Portugal) Academica)
—	FW	GRE	Evangelos Mantzios (on loan from (Greece) Panathinaikos)
—	FW	CYP	Marcos Michael (from (England) Bolton Wanderers Reserves)
—	MF	FRA	Bruno Cheyrou (from (France) Stade Rennais)

Out:

No.	Pos.	Nation	Player
—	MF	POR	Ricardo Fernandes (to AEL Limassol)
—	FW	POL	Łukasz Sosin (to (Greece) Kavala)
—	MF	CYP	Alexandros Garpozis (to AEL Limassol)
—	FW	GRE	Nikolaos Frousos (retired)

=== APEP Pitsilia ===
In:

No.	Pos.	Nation	Player
—	DF	ENG	Marvin Hamilton (from (England) Lincoln City)

Out:

No.	Pos.	Nation	Player
—	DF	NED	Pascal Heije (released)
—	DF	CYP	Yiannis Theofanous (on loan to Frenaros FC 2000)
—	MF	CYP	Xenios Kyriakou (released)
—	MF	GER	Andy Nägelein (released)

=== APOEL ===
In:

No.	Pos.	Nation	Player
—	GK	CYP	Sofronis Avgousti (from Aris Limassol)
—	DF	GRE	Vangelis Koutsopoulos (from (Greece) Atromitos)
—	MF	BRA	Marcinho (from (Portugal) Maritimo)

Out:

No.	Pos.	Nation	Player
—	MF	CYP	Demetris Kyriakou (on loan to Olympiakos Nicosia)

=== Apollon Limassol ===
In:

No.	Pos.	Nation	Player
—	MF	SWE	Valentino Lai (on loan from (Denmark) Vejle Boldklub)
—	DF	CRC	Gonzalo Segares (from (United States) Chicago Fire)

Out:

No.	Pos.	Nation	Player
—	DF	GRE	Giannis Sfakianakis (to APOP Kinyras)
—	FW	SRB	Miljan Mrdaković (on loan to Ethnikos Achna)
—	MF	ISR	Moshe Mishaelof (on loan to AEP Paphos)

=== APOP Kinyras Peyias ===
In:

No.	Pos.	Nation	Player
—	DF	GRE	Nikos Barboudis (from (Greece) AEK Athens)
—	DF	GRE	Giannis Sfakianakis (from Apollon Limassol)
—	FW	CZE	Jiří Mašek (from Nea Salamina)
—	MF	POR	Paulo Costa (from (Greece) Levadiakos)
—	GK	LTU	Šarūnas Jurevičius (from (Lithuania) FK Šiauliai)

Out:

No.	Pos.	Nation	Player
—	DF	WAL	Michael Walsh (to AEK Kouklion)
—	FW	CYP	Marios Neophytou (to Akritas Chloraka)

=== Aris Limassol ===
In:

No.	Pos.	Nation	Player
—	MF	GRE	Giorgos Vourexakis (from (Greece) Platanias)
—	MF	LVA	Vitālijs Rečickis (from (Latvia) SK Blāzma)
—	MF	ARG	Sebastián Salomón (from (Argentina) Godoy Cruz)
—	MF	SLE	Julius Woobay (on loan from (Romania) Universitatea Craiova)
—	GK	CYP	Nikolas Asprogenis (on loan from AC Omonia)
—	FW	ARG	Francisco Aguirre (on loan from AC Omonia)
—	DF	BUL	Ventsislav Vasilev (from (Bulgaria) Minyor Pernik)

Out:

No.	Pos.	Nation	Player
—	DF	SCO	Jamie McKenzie (released)
—	DF	ROU	Daniel Bălan (released)
—	MF	BRA	Paulo Santos (to Digenis Morphou)
—	FW	NGA	Andrew Esealuka (to ASIL)
—	MF	SRB	Ognjen Lekić (released)
—	GK	CYP	Sofronis Avgousti (to APOEL)
—	DF	POR	Ricardo Nunes (to Olympiakos Nicosia)
—	MF	BRA	Eduardo Marques (to AEP Paphos)

=== Doxa Katokopia ===
In:

No.	Pos.	Nation	Player
—	MF	MLT	Udo Nwoko (from (Greece) Panthrakikos)
—	FW	BRA	Gabriel Lima (from AEP Paphos)
—	MF	POR	Paulo Sereno (from (Portugal) GDR Monsanto)

Out:

No.	Pos.	Nation	Player
—	MF	GRE	Georgios Kostis (to Omonia Aradippou)
—	FW	CYP	Sotiris Vourkou (to PAEEK FC)
—	MF	GNB	Malá (released)
—	FW	POR	Milton (to AEK Larnaca)

=== Enosis Neon Paralimni ===
In:

No.	Pos.	Nation	Player

Out:

No.	Pos.	Nation	Player
—	DF	POR	Hugo Simoes (to Ayia Napa FC)

=== Ermis Aradippou ===
In:

No.	Pos.	Nation	Player
—	FW	POR	Sebastião Nogueira (from Nea Salamina)
—	MF	BRA	Jaílson (from (Portugal) S.C. Olhanense)
—	DF	GRE	Spyros Gogolos (from (Greece) PAS Giannina)
—	FW	BRA	Evandro Roncatto (from (Portugal) Paços de Ferreira)
—	GK	SRB	Aleksandar Čanović (from (Belarus) Dinamo Minsk)

Out:

No.	Pos.	Nation	Player
—	FW	URU	Nicolás Raimondi (released)
—	FW	NED	Kiran Bechan (released)
—	MF	SLV	Eliseo Quintanilla (to (Mexico) Correcaminos UAT)
—	MF	CYP	Marios Louka (released)
—	MF	CYP	Kyriacos Pavlou (to (Greece) Diagoras)
—	MF	SLE	Sheriff Suma (to (Turkey) Kocaelispor)

=== Ethnikos Achna ===
In:

No.	Pos.	Nation	Player
—	FW	SRB	Miljan Mrdaković (on loan from Apollon Limassol)
—	MF	SRB	Zoran Stjepanović (from ASIL)
—	MF	MKD	Slavčo Georgievski (from (South Korea) Ulsan Hyundai)
—	MF	ESP	José Antonio Villanueva (from (Spain) UD Puertollano)

Out:

No.	Pos.	Nation	Player
—	MF	ANG	Édson (released)
—	FW	GLP	Michaël Niçoise (released)

=== Nea Salamina ===
In:

No.	Pos.	Nation	Player
—	MF	ISR	Baruch Dego (from (Israel) F.C. Ashdod)
—	DF	FRA	Willy Fondja (free agent)
—	GK	VEN	Rafael Ponzo (from (Spain) AD Ceuta)
—	FW	BRA	Rodrigo (from (Faroe Islands) KÍ Klaksvík)

Out:

No.	Pos.	Nation	Player
—	MF	HUN	Norbert Sipos (to (Hungary) Szombathelyi Haladás)
—	FW	CZE	Tomáš Pešír (released)
—	FW	POR	Eugenio Neves (to AEK Larnaca)
—	FW	POR	Sebastião Nogueira (to Ermis Aradippou)
—	GK	POL	Marcin Juszczyk (to (Poland) Wisła Kraków)
—	FW	CZE	Jiří Mašek (to APOP Kinyras)
—	MF	POR	Rui Lima (to (Israel) Hapoel Haifa)
—	DF	ALG	Nordine Sam (released)

=== Omonia ===
In:

No.	Pos.	Nation	Player
—	FW	PER	Hernán Rengifo (from (Poland) Lech Poznań)
—	DF	HUN	Leandro (from (Hungary) Debreceni VSC)
—	FW	BFA	Abdul Diallo (from (Greece) Panthrakikos)
—	DF	BRA	Kaká (on loan from (Germany) Hertha BSC)

Out:

No.	Pos.	Nation	Player
—	DF	SRB	Aleksandar Pantić (released)
—	DF	URU	Pablo Cáceres (to (Uruguay) Danubio F.C.)
—	FW	BFA	Abdul Diallo (on loan to AEP Paphos)
—	GK	CYP	Nikolas Asporogenis (on loan to Aris Limassol)
—	FW	ARG	Francisco Aguirre (on loan to Aris Limassol)

== Cypriot Second Division ==
=== AEK Larnaca ===
In:

No.	Pos.	Nation	Player
—	FW	POR	Eugenio Neves (from Nea Salamina)
—	MF	ESP	Iván Campo (from (England) Ipswich Town)
—	MF	CYP	Antonis Panagi (from Olympiakos Nicosia)
—	FW	POR	Milton (from Doxa Katokopia)
—	MF	SVN	Dejan Geric (from (Slovenia) Interblock Ljubljana)

Out:

No.	Pos.	Nation	Player
—	MF	GRE	Xenofon Gittas (to (Greece) Ilioupoli F.C.)
—	FW	SVN	Jože Benko (on loan to (Slovenia) NK Nafta Lendava)
—	MF	MAR	Ali El-Omari (released)

=== Akritas Chlorakas ===
In:

No.	Pos.	Nation	Player
—	FW	CYP	Marios Neophytou (from APOP Kinyras Peyias)

Out:

No.	Pos.	Nation	Player

=== Alki Larnaca ===
In:

No.	Pos.	Nation	Player
—	DF	ARG	Damián Giménez (from (Ukraine) Chornomorets)
—	MF	CYP	Simos Krassas (from AEL Limassol)
—	DF	CYP	Pantelis Pitsillos (on loan from AEL Limassol)

Out:

No.	Pos.	Nation	Player
—	FW	GNB	Suleimane Baio (released)
—	DF	ENG	Michael Felgate (released)
—	FW	CYP	Demetris Theofanous (released)
—	MF	CYP	Costas Pouros (to Elpida Xylofagou)

=== ASIL ===
In:

No.	Pos.	Nation	Player
—	FW	NGA	Andrew Esealuka (from Aris Limassol)

Out:

No.	Pos.	Nation	Player
—	FW	ROU	Alin Liţu (loan return to FC Steaua)

=== Atromitos Yeroskipou ===
In:

No.	Pos.	Nation	Player
—	MF	NED	Regilio Seedorf (from (Belgium) K.S.K. Beveren)
—	MF	SRB	Aleksandar Mutavdžić (free agent)

Out:

No.	Pos.	Nation	Player
—	MF	HUN	Attila Szili (released)

=== Ayia Napa F.C. ===
In:

No.	Pos.	Nation	Player
—	DF	POR	Hugo Simoes (from Enosis Neon Paralimni)

Out:

No.	Pos.	Nation	Player
—	DF	CYP	Marios Nikola (released)
—	MF	CYP	Andreas Kakousias (to Elpida Xylofagou)
—	MF	CZE	Martin Chalupa (released)

=== Digenis Akritas Morphou ===
In:

No.	Pos.	Nation	Player
—	MF	BRA	Paulo Santos (from Aris Limassol)
—	MF	MAR	Hamid Rhanem (from (France) Racing Paris)

Out:

No.	Pos.	Nation	Player
—	MF	GAM	Jatto Ceesay (to Othellos Athienou)
—	MF	GHA	Yaw Rush (released)
—	DF	GRE	Nikos Koliokostas (released)
—	MF	CPV	Spencer (released)

=== Frenaros FC 2000 ===
In:

No.	Pos.	Nation	Player
—	GK	CYP	Andreas Stasi (free agent)
—	DF	CYP	Yiannis Theofanous (on loan from APEP Pitsilia)

Out:

No.	Pos.	Nation	Player

=== MEAP Nisou ===
In:

No.	Pos.	Nation	Player

Out:

No.	Pos.	Nation	Player

=== Olympiakos Nicosia ===
In:

No.	Pos.	Nation	Player
—	MF	CYP	Demetris Kyriakou (On loan from APOEL)
—	MF	FRA	Guillaume Beuzelin (from (Scotland) Hamilton Academical F.C.)
—	GK	GRE	Dimitris Rizos (free agent)
—	DF	POR	Ricardo Nunes (from Aris Limassol)
—	DF	BUL	Georgi Kalakov (from (Belarus) FC Dinamo Minsk)

Out:

No.	Pos.	Nation	Player
—	FW	SVK	Jozef Kožlej (to (Greece) Thrasyvoulos F.C.)
—	MF	SVK	Ján Šafranko
—	FW	BIH	Esad Razić (to (Germany) RW Oberhausen)
—	FW	SVK	Rastislav Chmelo
—	DF	CYP	Giorgos Ioannidis
—	GK	SVN	Stanislav Kuzma

=== Omonia Aradippou ===
In:

No.	Pos.	Nation	Player
—	MF	GRE	Georgios Kostis (from Doxa Katokopias)

Out:

No.	Pos.	Nation	Player
—	MF	ROU	Marian Galbenu (to Spartakos Kitiou)

=== Onisilos Sotira ===
In:

No.	Pos.	Nation	Player
—	FW	POR	Fausto Lourenco (Free Agent)
—	FW	ZIM	Edward Mashinya (from PAEEK FC)

Out:

No.	Pos.	Nation	Player
—	FW	HUN	Gábor Fekete (released)
—	FW	CYP	Demos Demosthenous (released)

=== Othellos Athienou F.C. ===
In:

No.	Pos.	Nation	Player
—	FW	LVA	Gatis Kalniņš (from (Latvia) FK Jūrmala-VV)
—	FW	GAM	Jatto Ceesay (from Digenis Morphou)

Out:

No.	Pos.	Nation	Player
—	FW	POR	Nimes de Pina (released)
—	MF	POL	Andrzej Ignaciuk (released)
—	FW	CYP	Costas Zorpas (released)

=== PAEEK FC ===
In:

No.	Pos.	Nation	Player
—	FW	BRA	Miranda (from (Brazil) São José Esporte Clube)
—	FW	CYP	Sotiris Vourkou (from Doxa Katokopia)

Out:

No.	Pos.	Nation	Player
—	MF	GRE	Dimitrios Zografakis (to Chalkanoras Idaliou)
—	FW	ZIM	Edward Mashinya (to Onisilos)
—	MF	CYP	Constantinos Christoudias (to Adonis Idaliou)
—	MF	CYP	Solonas Papayiannis (released)

== See also ==
- List of Belgian football transfers winter 2009–10
- List of Danish football transfers winter 2009–10
- List of English football transfers winter 2009–10
- List of French football transfers winter 2010
- List of German football transfers winter 2009–10
- List of Italian football transfers winter 2009–10
- List of Latvian football transfers winter 2009–10
- List of Maltese football transfers winter 2009–10
- List of Serbian football transfers winter 2009–10
- List of Spanish football transfers winter 2009–10
- List of Swedish football transfers winter 2009–2010
