= List of Cypriot football transfers winter 2011–12 =

This is a list of Cypriot football transfers for the 2011–12 winter transfer window by club. Only transfers of clubs in the Cypriot First Division and Cypriot Second Division are included.

The winter transfer window opened on 1 January 2012, although a few transfers took place prior to that date. The window closed at midnight on 31 January 2012. Players without a club may join one at any time, either during or in between transfer windows.

== Marfin Laiki League ==
=== AEK Larnaca ===
In: Note: Flags indicate national team as defined under FIFA eligibility rules; some limited exceptions apply. Players may hold more than one non-FIFA nationality.

No.	Pos.	Nation	Player
32	MF	CYP	Dimitris Kyprianou (from (England) Nottingham Forest U-18)
28	MF	ESP	Luis Morán (on loan from (Spain) Sporting Gijón)
25	MF	CRO	Antun Palić (from (Croatia) Dinamo Zagreb)
31	MF	BRA	Alex da Silva (from Omonia)

Out: Note: Flags indicate national team as defined under FIFA eligibility rules; some limited exceptions apply. Players may hold more than one non-FIFA nationality.

No.	Pos.	Nation	Player
24	DF	POR	Diogo Vila (loan return to Doxa Katokopia)
21	FW	CMR	Njongo Priso (to (Bulgaria) PFC CSKA Sofia)
39	FW	NGA	Sunny Kingsley (retired)
27	MF	ARG	Rubén Gómez (to (Ukraine) Tavriya Simferopol)
9	FW	SRB	Miljan Mrdaković (to (China) Jiangsu Sainty)

=== AEL Limassol ===
In: Note: Flags indicate national team as defined under FIFA eligibility rules; some limited exceptions apply. Players may hold more than one non-FIFA nationality.

No.	Pos.	Nation	Player
84	FW	GHA	Chris Dickson (from Nea Salamis)
25	MF	POR	Kaby (from (England) Chelsea Reserves)
70	MF	ANG	Gilberto (from (Belgium) Lierse)
44	DF	POR	Hugo Sousa (from (Romania) FC Brașov)

Out: Note: Flags indicate national team as defined under FIFA eligibility rules; some limited exceptions apply. Players may hold more than one non-FIFA nationality.

No.	Pos.	Nation	Player
80	FW	NGA	Benjamin Onwuachi (to (Greece) Panetolikos)

=== Alki Larnaca ===
In: Note: Flags indicate national team as defined under FIFA eligibility rules; some limited exceptions apply. Players may hold more than one non-FIFA nationality.

No.	Pos.	Nation	Player
19	MF	ISR	Roei Beckel (from (Israel) Maccabi Petah Tikva)
1	GK	POL	Paweł Kapsa (free agent)
15	FW	ROU	Ciprian Tănasă (from (Romania) CS Mioveni)
4	MF	POR	Barge (from (Portugal) U.D. Oliveirense)
27	FW	BRA	Sidnei (from Enosis Neon Paralimni)

Out: Note: Flags indicate national team as defined under FIFA eligibility rules; some limited exceptions apply. Players may hold more than one non-FIFA nationality.

No.	Pos.	Nation	Player
10	MF	ARG	Darío Fernández (to (Israel) Beitar Jerusalem)
17	FW	ANG	Luwamo Garcia (to (Angola) C.R. Caála)
14	FW	ARG	David Solari (to (Israel) Hapoel Ironi Kiryat Shmona)
16	MF	CYP	Giorgos Panagi (on loan to Anagennisi Dherynia)
22	MF	ROU	Dragoş Firţulescu (to (Romania) FCM Târgu Mureș)
93	DF	HAI	Frantz Bertin (released)
18	DF	CYP	Constantinos Samaras (to Ethnikos Achna)
23	MF	CYP	Christodoulos Kountouretis (to Ermis Aradippou)
1	GK	POL	Radosław Cierzniak (to (Poland) Zagłębie Lubin)
13	DF	POR	Carlos Marques (to Olympiakos Nicosia)
33	DF	CYP	Elias Charalambous (to (Germany) Karlsruher SC)

=== Anagennisi Dherynia ===
In: Note: Flags indicate national team as defined under FIFA eligibility rules; some limited exceptions apply. Players may hold more than one non-FIFA nationality.

No.	Pos.	Nation	Player
32	FW	SRB	Milan Belić (from (Serbia) Radnički Sombor)
26	MF	CYP	Giorgos Panagi (on loan from Alki Larnaca)
3	DF	CYP	Panayiotis Spyrou (from Enosis Neon Paralimni)
86	MF	SLE	Shaka Bangura (from (United States) Richmond Kickers)
70	MF	CYP	Adamos Hadjigeorgiou (on loan from Anorthosis Famagusta)
—	MF	CYP	Roberto Hadjipavlou (from Ethnikos Assia)

Out: Note: Flags indicate national team as defined under FIFA eligibility rules; some limited exceptions apply. Players may hold more than one non-FIFA nationality.

No.	Pos.	Nation	Player
88	MF	SLE	Brima Koroma (to Frenaros FC)
24	FW	ZIM	Thabani Moyo (to Chalkanoras Idaliou)
8	DF	HUN	Aladár Virágh (to (Hungary) Balmazújvárosi)
33	DF	CYP	Panayiotis Dionysiou (to ASIL Lysi)
11	FW	CYP	Costas Georgiou (to Ayia Napa)
77	DF	VEN	Raúl González (to (Venezuela) Carabobo FC)
9	FW	BIH	Ivan Jolić (released)
7	MF	CRO	Robert Alviž (to (Azerbaijan) FK Khazar Lankaran)

=== Anorthosis ===
In: Note: Flags indicate national team as defined under FIFA eligibility rules; some limited exceptions apply. Players may hold more than one non-FIFA nationality.

No.	Pos.	Nation	Player
38	MF	CYP	Constantinos Laifis (from (England) Nottingham Forest U-18)
7	DF	GEO	David Kvirkvelia (from (Greece) Panionios)
54	MF	GRE	Giorgos Makris (on loan from (Greece) Atromitos)
8	MF	MAR	Jaouad Zairi (from (Greece) PAS Giannina)

Out: Note: Flags indicate national team as defined under FIFA eligibility rules; some limited exceptions apply. Players may hold more than one non-FIFA nationality.

No.	Pos.	Nation	Player
18	FW	CYP	Marcos Michael (on loan to (Cyprus) Enosis Neon Parekklisia)
12	DF	NED	Jeffrey Leiwakabessy (to (Netherlands) VVV-Venlo)
13	FW	CYP	Constantinos Mintikkis (on loan to Ethnikos Assia)
37	MF	CYP	Adamos Hadjigeorgiou (on loan to Anagennisi Dherynia)
10	MF	SRB	Nemanja Vučićević (to (Turkey) Manisaspor)
16	MF	POR	Cristovão Ramos (to (Bulgaria) Levski Sofia)

=== APOEL ===
In: Note: Flags indicate national team as defined under FIFA eligibility rules; some limited exceptions apply. Players may hold more than one non-FIFA nationality.

No.	Pos.	Nation	Player
31	MF	POR	Hélder Sousa (from Olympiakos Nicosia)

Out: Note: Flags indicate national team as defined under FIFA eligibility rules; some limited exceptions apply. Players may hold more than one non-FIFA nationality.

No.	Pos.	Nation	Player
14	MF	TUN	Tijani Belaid (to (Germany) 1. FC Union Berlin)
5	MF	BIH	Sanel Jahić (to (Turkey) Karabükspor)

=== Apollon Limassol ===
In: Note: Flags indicate national team as defined under FIFA eligibility rules; some limited exceptions apply. Players may hold more than one non-FIFA nationality.

No.	Pos.	Nation	Player
24	MF	POR	Zé Vítor (free agent)
37	DF	BRA	Thiago Sales (on loan from (Brazil) Avaí)
14	DF	MAR	Chakib Benzoukane (from (Indonesia) Pro Duta FC)
12	FW	PER	Gianfranco Labarthe (on loan from (Peru) Universidad San Martín)

Out: Note: Flags indicate national team as defined under FIFA eligibility rules; some limited exceptions apply. Players may hold more than one non-FIFA nationality.

No.	Pos.	Nation	Player
6	DF	SRB	Milovan Sikimić (to (France) RC Strasbourg)
3	DF	BRA	Luciano Amaral (released)
99	MF	GRE	Andreas Vasilogiannis (loan return to (Greece) Olympiacos)
8	MF	POR	Davide (to (Romania) FC Brașov)
69	MF	FRA	Helton Dos Reis (to (Réunion) JS Saint-Pierroise)
36	MF	CYP	Marios Charalambous (on loan to Ermis Aradippou)
22	DF	CYP	Giannis Demetriou (on loan to Enosis Neon Parekklisia)
96	DF	CYP	Stelios Demetriou (on loan to Ermis Aradippou)
19	FW	CYP	Andreas Pittaras (to Ethnikos Achna)
5	MF	ESP	Ion Erice (to (Greece) Kerkyra)
27	MF	ESP	Antonio Núñez (to (Spain) Huesca)

=== Aris Limassol ===
In: Note: Flags indicate national team as defined under FIFA eligibility rules; some limited exceptions apply. Players may hold more than one non-FIFA nationality.

No.	Pos.	Nation	Player
2	DF	SVN	Marko Barun (from Ermis Aradippou)
3	DF	EST	Andrei Stepanov (from (Belarus) FC Gomel)
88	MF	POR	Alberto Louzeiro (from (Portugal) Louletano)

Out: Note: Flags indicate national team as defined under FIFA eligibility rules; some limited exceptions apply. Players may hold more than one non-FIFA nationality.

No.	Pos.	Nation	Player
21	DF	BUL	Ventsislav Vasilev (to (Bulgaria) PFC Minyor Pernik)
15	DF	ARG	Andrés Imperiale (to (Chile) Universidad de Concepción)
18	MF	CYP	Elias Elia (released)
11	MF	BRA	Ricardo Malzoni (to Omonia Aradippou)

=== Enosis Neon Paralimni ===
In: Note: Flags indicate national team as defined under FIFA eligibility rules; some limited exceptions apply. Players may hold more than one non-FIFA nationality.

No.	Pos.	Nation	Player
16	MF	CYP	Giorgos Kolanis (from Ermis Aradippou)
18	FW	ISR	Idan Sade (on loan from (Israel) F.C. Ashdod)
15	MF	ZAM	Justine Zulu (from (Israel) Hapoel Rishon LeZion)

Out: Note: Flags indicate national team as defined under FIFA eligibility rules; some limited exceptions apply. Players may hold more than one non-FIFA nationality.

No.	Pos.	Nation	Player
4	MF	GRE	Kostas Kiassos (to (Greece) Panserraikos)
39	MF	MAR	Tarik Bengelloun (released)
33	DF	CYP	Panayiotis Spyrou (to Anagennisi Dherynia)
10	FW	BRA	Sidnei (to Alki Larnaca)

=== Ermis Aradippou ===
In: Note: Flags indicate national team as defined under FIFA eligibility rules; some limited exceptions apply. Players may hold more than one non-FIFA nationality.

No.	Pos.	Nation	Player
25	MF	CYP	Panayiotis Onisiforou (from POL/AEM Maroni)
11	DF	CYP	Stelios Demetriou (on loan from Apollon Limassol)
21	MF	GRE	Giannis Goumas (from (Greece) Vyzas F.C.)
30	MF	CYP	Christodoulos Kountouretis (from Alki Larnaca)
64	MF	CYP	Marios Charalambous (on loan from Apollon Limassol)

Out: Note: Flags indicate national team as defined under FIFA eligibility rules; some limited exceptions apply. Players may hold more than one non-FIFA nationality.

No.	Pos.	Nation	Player
4	MF	URU	Rodrigo Gómez (to (Venezuela) Llaneros de Guanare)
88	MF	IRL	Robbie Gibbons (to (England) Scunthorpe United)
25	MF	LBN	Zakaria Charara (to (Malaysia) Kelantan FA)
22	FW	AUS	Danny Invincible (to (Thailand) Army United)
6	DF	ARG	Daniel Blanco (to (Thailand) Army United)
81	MF	BRA	Elias (to (Bulgaria) Beroe)
20	MF	VEN	Héctor González (to (Venezuela) Carabobo FC)
19	MF	CYP	Giorgos Kolanis (to Enosis Neon Paralimni)
10	MF	POR	Saavedra (to Nea Salamina)
50	FW	BRA	Serjão (to Ethnikos Achna)
5	DF	CYP	Periklis Moustakas (to Nea Salamina)
2	DF	SVN	Marko Barun (to Aris Limassol)

=== Ethnikos Achna ===
In: Note: Flags indicate national team as defined under FIFA eligibility rules; some limited exceptions apply. Players may hold more than one non-FIFA nationality.

No.	Pos.	Nation	Player
50	FW	BRA	Serjão (from Ermis Aradippou)
32	DF	CYP	Constantinos Samaras (from Alki Larnaca)
31	DF	SWE	Fredrik Risp (from (Bulgaria) PFC Levski Sofia)
28	FW	ZIM	Edward Mashinya (from APOP Kinyras)
99	FW	CYP	Andreas Pittaras (from Apollon Limassol)

Out: Note: Flags indicate national team as defined under FIFA eligibility rules; some limited exceptions apply. Players may hold more than one non-FIFA nationality.

No.	Pos.	Nation	Player
99	FW	GLP	Mickaël Antoine-Curier (released)
11	FW	EST	Ats Purje (to (Romania) Pandurii Târgu Jiu)
29	FW	GEO	Levan Kebadze (to Omonia Aradippou)
18	FW	SRB	Marko Pavićević (to (Serbia) Borac Čačak)
6	DF	GRE	Giorgos Machlelis (released)
30	MF	BRA	Cássio (to (China) Changchun Yatai)
19	MF	SRB	Saša Stojanović (released)

=== Nea Salamina ===
In: Note: Flags indicate national team as defined under FIFA eligibility rules; some limited exceptions apply. Players may hold more than one non-FIFA nationality.

No.	Pos.	Nation	Player
42	GK	ESP	Ángel Pindado (free agent)
29	MF	POR	Saavedra (from Ermis Aradippou)
21	DF	CYP	Periklis Moustakas (from Ermis Aradippou)
18	MF	ESP	David Sousa (from (Spain) Albacete)
27	FW	EST	Andres Oper (free agent)
33	FW	GHA	Samuel Yeboah (from (Israel) F.C. Ashdod)

Out: Note: Flags indicate national team as defined under FIFA eligibility rules; some limited exceptions apply. Players may hold more than one non-FIFA nationality.

No.	Pos.	Nation	Player
13	GK	ESP	Albert Marrama (released)
17	MF	GHA	Imoro Lukman (to (Israel) Hapoel Rishon LeZion)
19	MF	BIH	Branislav Nikić (released)
9	FW	CYP	Alekos Alekou (to (Hungary) Soproni VSE)
10	FW	GHA	Chris Dickson (to AEL Limassol)
23	FW	BEL	Dieter Van Tornhout (to (Scotland) Kilmarnock)

=== Olympiakos Nicosia ===
In: Note: Flags indicate national team as defined under FIFA eligibility rules; some limited exceptions apply. Players may hold more than one non-FIFA nationality.

No.	Pos.	Nation	Player
25	MF	SRB	Dejan Rusmir (from (United States) Columbus Crew)
76	DF	POR	Carlos Marques (from Alki Larnaca)
77	MF	ARG	Ramiro Rendón (from (Bolivia) Club Jorge Wilstermann)
99	FW	GER	Mustafa Kučuković (from (Germany) Energie Cottbus)

Out: Note: Flags indicate national team as defined under FIFA eligibility rules; some limited exceptions apply. Players may hold more than one non-FIFA nationality.

No.	Pos.	Nation	Player
10	MF	POR	David Caiado (to (Bulgaria) Beroe)
31	MF	POR	Hélder Sousa (to APOEL)
32	GK	LVA	Andrejs Pavlovs (to (Bulgaria) Lokomotiv Plovdiv)
9	FW	SRB	Nenad Mirosavljević (to (Serbia) FK Napredak Kruševac)
17	MF	VEN	César Castro (released)
24	DF	ESP	Pablo Amo (released)

=== Omonia ===
In: Note: Flags indicate national team as defined under FIFA eligibility rules; some limited exceptions apply. Players may hold more than one non-FIFA nationality.

No.	Pos.	Nation	Player
17	FW	CYP	Theodosis Kyprou (loan return from Chalkanoras Idaliou)
19	DF	ISR	David Ben Dayan (from (Israel) Hapoel Tel Aviv)
8	MF	FRA	Bryan Bergougnoux (on loan from (Italy) U.S. Lecce)
25	FW	BRA	Andre Alves (from (Hungary) Videoton)

Out: Note: Flags indicate national team as defined under FIFA eligibility rules; some limited exceptions apply. Players may hold more than one non-FIFA nationality.

No.	Pos.	Nation	Player
3	DF	BRA	Davidson (released)
21	GK	URU	Damián Frascarelli (to (Uruguay) Bella Vista)
23	FW	PER	Hernán Rengifo (to (Peru) Sporting Cristal)
9	MF	BRA	Alex da Silva (to AEK Larnaca)

== Cypriot Second Division ==
=== AEP Paphos ===
In: Note: Flags indicate national team as defined under FIFA eligibility rules; some limited exceptions apply. Players may hold more than one non-FIFA nationality.

No.	Pos.	Nation	Player
—	MF	CYP	Giorgos Georgiou (from Atromitos Yeroskipou)
—	FW	BUL	Simeon Ganchev (from (Bulgaria) OFC Sliven 2000)

Out: Note: Flags indicate national team as defined under FIFA eligibility rules; some limited exceptions apply. Players may hold more than one non-FIFA nationality.

No.	Pos.	Nation	Player
—	FW	POR	Cascavel (released)

=== Akritas Chloraka ===
In: Note: Flags indicate national team as defined under FIFA eligibility rules; some limited exceptions apply. Players may hold more than one non-FIFA nationality.

No.	Pos.	Nation	Player

Out: Note: Flags indicate national team as defined under FIFA eligibility rules; some limited exceptions apply. Players may hold more than one non-FIFA nationality.

No.	Pos.	Nation	Player

=== APEP Pitsilia ===
In: Note: Flags indicate national team as defined under FIFA eligibility rules; some limited exceptions apply. Players may hold more than one non-FIFA nationality.

No.	Pos.	Nation	Player
—	MF	MAR	Hamid Rhanem (free agent)
—	FW	SUI	Slaviša Dugić (from Othellos Athienou)

Out: Note: Flags indicate national team as defined under FIFA eligibility rules; some limited exceptions apply. Players may hold more than one non-FIFA nationality.

No.	Pos.	Nation	Player
—	DF	POR	Nuno Rodrigues (to (Angola) C.R. Caála)
—	FW	GNB	Dionísio Mendes (to (Tunisia) Stade Tunisien)

=== APOP Kinyras Peyias ===
In: Note: Flags indicate national team as defined under FIFA eligibility rules; some limited exceptions apply. Players may hold more than one non-FIFA nationality.

No.	Pos.	Nation	Player
—	MF	POR	Rui Lopes (from (Portugal) Cinfães)
—	FW	SVK	Andrej Hesek (from (Slovakia) MFK Zemplín Michalovce)

Out: Note: Flags indicate national team as defined under FIFA eligibility rules; some limited exceptions apply. Players may hold more than one non-FIFA nationality.

No.	Pos.	Nation	Player
—	MF	FRA	Jimmy Dechêne (released)
—	DF	CYP	Pavlos Neofytou (released)
—	FW	CYP	Giorgos Loizou (to Kedros Agias Marinas)
—	FW	ZIM	Edward Mashinya (to Ethnikos Achna)
—	FW	POR	Riera (released)

=== Atromitos Yeroskipou ===
In: Note: Flags indicate national team as defined under FIFA eligibility rules; some limited exceptions apply. Players may hold more than one non-FIFA nationality.

No.	Pos.	Nation	Player

Out: Note: Flags indicate national team as defined under FIFA eligibility rules; some limited exceptions apply. Players may hold more than one non-FIFA nationality.

No.	Pos.	Nation	Player
—	MF	SVN	Jalen Pokorn (to (Slovenia) NK Triglav)
—	FW	COD	Tcham N'Toya (released)
—	GK	LVA	Artūrs Vaičulis (released)
—	DF	BIH	Nikola Mikelini (released)
—	DF	BUL	Dimitar Nakov (released)
—	MF	BUL	Asparuh Vasilev (released)
—	FW	BUL	Borislav Hazurov (to (Bulgaria) FC Bdin)
—	MF	CYP	Giorgos Georgiou (to AEP Paphos)

=== Ayia Napa ===
In: Note: Flags indicate national team as defined under FIFA eligibility rules; some limited exceptions apply. Players may hold more than one non-FIFA nationality.

No.	Pos.	Nation	Player
—	FW	CYP	Costas Georgiou (from Anagennisi Dherynia)

Out: Note: Flags indicate national team as defined under FIFA eligibility rules; some limited exceptions apply. Players may hold more than one non-FIFA nationality.

No.	Pos.	Nation	Player
—	FW	CPV	Mateus Lopes (to Ethnikos Assia)

=== Chalkanoras Idaliou ===
In: Note: Flags indicate national team as defined under FIFA eligibility rules; some limited exceptions apply. Players may hold more than one non-FIFA nationality.

No.	Pos.	Nation	Player
—	MF	CYP	Theodoros Katsiaris (from POL/AEM Maroni)
—	FW	ZIM	Thabani Moyo (from Anagennisi Dherynia)

Out: Note: Flags indicate national team as defined under FIFA eligibility rules; some limited exceptions apply. Players may hold more than one non-FIFA nationality.

No.	Pos.	Nation	Player
—	GK	CZE	Milan Zahálka (released)
—	FW	CYP	Theodosis Kyprou (loan return to Omonia)

=== Doxa Katokopia ===
In: Note: Flags indicate national team as defined under FIFA eligibility rules; some limited exceptions apply. Players may hold more than one non-FIFA nationality.

No.	Pos.	Nation	Player
—	FW	POR	Milton (from PAEEK FC)
—	DF	POR	Diogo Vila (loan return from AEK Larnaca)

Out: Note: Flags indicate national team as defined under FIFA eligibility rules; some limited exceptions apply. Players may hold more than one non-FIFA nationality.

No.	Pos.	Nation	Player

=== Enosis Neon Parekklisia ===
In: Note: Flags indicate national team as defined under FIFA eligibility rules; some limited exceptions apply. Players may hold more than one non-FIFA nationality.

No.	Pos.	Nation	Player
—	DF	CYP	Giannis Demetriou (on loan from Apollon Limassol)
—	FW	CYP	Marcos Michael (on loan from Anorthosis Famagusta)

Out: Note: Flags indicate national team as defined under FIFA eligibility rules; some limited exceptions apply. Players may hold more than one non-FIFA nationality.

No.	Pos.	Nation	Player

=== Ethnikos Assia ===
In: Note: Flags indicate national team as defined under FIFA eligibility rules; some limited exceptions apply. Players may hold more than one non-FIFA nationality.

No.	Pos.	Nation	Player
—	FW	CPV	Mateus Lopes (from Ayia Napa F.C.)
—	FW	CYP	Constantinos Mintikkis (on loan from Anorthosis Famagusta)
—	GK	POR	Nuno Santos (free agent)

Out: Note: Flags indicate national team as defined under FIFA eligibility rules; some limited exceptions apply. Players may hold more than one non-FIFA nationality.

No.	Pos.	Nation	Player
—	FW	CYP	Marios Eleftheriou (to Adonis Idaliou)
—	MF	CYP	Adamos Efstathiou (to Othellos Athienou)
—	FW	GUI	Dinah Diawara (to ASIL Lysi)
—	GK	ARG	Ramiro González (released)
—	MF	CYP	Andreas Mitsidis (to AEK Kythreas)
—	MF	CYP	Roberto Hadjipavlou (to Anagennisi Dherynia)

=== Omonia Aradippou ===
In: Note: Flags indicate national team as defined under FIFA eligibility rules; some limited exceptions apply. Players may hold more than one non-FIFA nationality.

No.	Pos.	Nation	Player
—	MF	BRA	Ricardo Malzoni (from Aris Limassol)
—	FW	GEO	Levan Kebadze (from Ethnikos Achna)

Out: Note: Flags indicate national team as defined under FIFA eligibility rules; some limited exceptions apply. Players may hold more than one non-FIFA nationality.

No.	Pos.	Nation	Player
—	MF	CYP	Constantinos Pris (released)
—	FW	CYP	Kyriacos Chailis (to PAEEK FC)
—	DF	GRE	Demetris Maris (to THOI Lakatamia)
—	FW	CYP	Constantinos Georgiades (to THOI Lakatamia)
—	DF	NED	Stanley Tailor (released)

=== Onisilos Sotira ===
In: Note: Flags indicate national team as defined under FIFA eligibility rules; some limited exceptions apply. Players may hold more than one non-FIFA nationality.

No.	Pos.	Nation	Player
—	FW	GUI	Aliou Traore (from (Malta) St. Lawrence Spurs)
—	FW	CYP	Kyriakos Chatziaros (from Spartakos Kitiou)

Out: Note: Flags indicate national team as defined under FIFA eligibility rules; some limited exceptions apply. Players may hold more than one non-FIFA nationality.

No.	Pos.	Nation	Player
—	MF	BUL	Konstantin Mirchev (to (Bulgaria) Botev Vratsa)

=== Othellos Athienou ===
In: Note: Flags indicate national team as defined under FIFA eligibility rules; some limited exceptions apply. Players may hold more than one non-FIFA nationality.

No.	Pos.	Nation	Player
—	MF	CYP	Adamos Efstathiou (from Ethnikos Assia)
—	FW	COD	Egola Mbela (from PAEEK FC)

Out: Note: Flags indicate national team as defined under FIFA eligibility rules; some limited exceptions apply. Players may hold more than one non-FIFA nationality.

No.	Pos.	Nation	Player
—	GK	POR	Alemão (released)
—	FW	POL	Mateusz Fryc (released)
—	FW	SUI	Slaviša Dugić (to APEP)
—	DF	POR	Zé Inácio (released)

=== PAEEK FC ===
In: Note: Flags indicate national team as defined under FIFA eligibility rules; some limited exceptions apply. Players may hold more than one non-FIFA nationality.

No.	Pos.	Nation	Player
—	FW	CYP	Kyriacos Chailis (from Omonia Aradippou)

Out: Note: Flags indicate national team as defined under FIFA eligibility rules; some limited exceptions apply. Players may hold more than one non-FIFA nationality.

No.	Pos.	Nation	Player
—	FW	COD	Egola Mbela (to Othellos Athienou)
—	FW	POR	Milton (to Doxa Katokopia)
—	MF	POR	Joca (released)
—	FW	POR	Pedras (released)

== See also ==
- (Bulgaria) List of Bulgarian football transfers winter 2011–12
- (Netherlands) List of Dutch football transfers winter 2011–12
- (England) List of English football transfers winter 2011–12
- (Malta) List of Maltese football transfers winter 2011–12
- (Germany) List of German football transfers winter 2011–12
- (Greece) List of Greek football transfers winter 2011–12
- (Portugal) List of Portuguese football transfers winter 2011–12
- (Spain) List of Spanish football transfers winter 2011–12
- (Latvia) List of Latvian football transfers winter 2011–12
- (Serbia) List of Serbian football transfers winter 2011–12
