= Xenophontos (surname) =

Xenophontos is a surname. Notable people with the surname include:

- Christos Xenofontos (born 1989), Cypriot footballer
- Sophia Xenophontos (born 1985), Greek-Cypriot academic and author
