= Joshua Izuchukwu =

Nigerian footballer and coach

Personal information
- Full name: Joshua Izuchukwu Onyeachonam
- Date of birth: July 24, 1984 (age 42)
- Place of birth: Onitsha, Nigeria
- Height: 1.78 m (5 ft 10 in)
- Position: Winger

Youth career
- Mobile Pegasus Eket

Senior career*
Years	Team	Apps	(Gls)
1999–2000	Sharks FC	25	(15)
2000–2002	FC Sheriff	10	(3)
2002–2003	FC Tiraspol	17	(9)
2003–2004	FC Sheriff	7	(2)
2004–2006	Al-Ittihad Al-Sakndary	23	(6)
2006–2007	Moqaouloun	16	(2)
2008–2010	AEK Larnaca	37	(8)
2010–2011	Nea Salamis Famagusta FC	23	(3)
2011–2013	APEP	26	(7)
2013	Ayia Napa F.C.	8	(0)
2014	Nikos & Sokratis Erimis	13	(1)
2014–2015	APEP	16	(9)
- * Club domestic league appearances and goals

Joshua Izuchukwu Onyeachonam (born July 24, 1984 in Onitsha) is a Nigerian football player. He last played in Cyprus in February 2015. Currently he is the assistant coach at BK Olympic Lindängen in Malmo, Sweden.

== Career ==
He signed for AEK Larnaca on Mid-season of 2008 until 2010 in Cyprus.
