= Stamatis Pantos =

Cypriot footballer

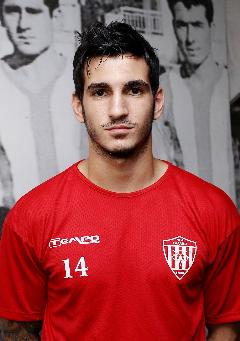

Personal information
- Full name: Stamatis Pantos
- Date of birth: March 22, 1990 (age 36)
- Place of birth: Limassol, Cyprus
- Height: 1.81 m (5 ft 11 1/2 in)
- Position: Forward

Team information
- Current team: AEZ Zakakiou

Senior career*
Years	Team	Apps	(Gls)
2008–2009	Apollon Limassol	6	(1)
2009–2011	→ APEP Pitsilia (loan)	10	(1)
2010–2011	→ Akritas Chlorakas(loan)	18	(2)
2011–2012	Enosis Neon Parekklisia	19	(0)
2012–2013	AEK Kouklia	29	(16)
2013–2014	Nea Salamina	21	(3)
2014–2015	Pafos FC	11	(6)
2015–2019	Karmiotissa	49	(33)
2019–	AEZ Zakakiou	0	(0)

International career
2006–2007	Cyprus U17	3	(1)
2007–2009	Cyprus U19	3	(1)
2009–2011	Cyprus U21	4	(0)
- * Club domestic league appearances and goals as of May 2019

Stamatis Pantos (Greek: Σταμάτης Πάντος; born March 22, 1990, in Limassol) is a Cypriot footballer currently playing for AEZ Zakakiou in the Cypriot Second Division.

== Career ==
On 1 July 2019, AEZ Zakakiou confirmed the signing of Pantos.
