= Jorge Prado (footballer, born 1982) =

Spanish footballer

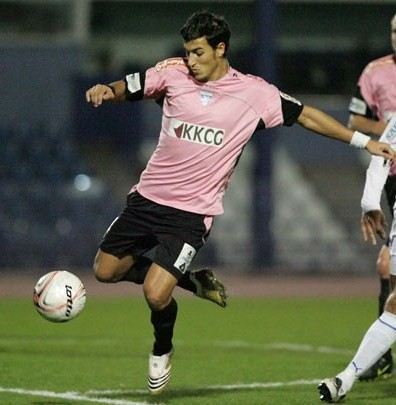

Personal information
- Full name: Jorge Prado Rus
- Date of birth: 20 January 1982 (age 44)
- Place of birth: Madrid, Spain
- Height: 1.80 m (5 ft 11 in)
- Position: Defender

Youth career
- Atlético Madrid

Senior career*
Years	Team	Apps	(Gls)
2001–2003	Atlético C		
2003–2007	Rayo Majadahonda		
2007	Parla		
2008–2010	APEP	27	(0)
2010–2011	Atromitos		
2011–2013	Pozuelo		
- * Club domestic league appearances and goals

Jorge Prado Rus (born 20 January 1982) is a Spanish former footballer who played as a defender.
