= Giorgos Constanti =

Cypriot footballer (born 1980)

Personal information
- Full name: Georgios Constanti
- Date of birth: 19 September 1980 (age 46)
- Place of birth: Limassol, Cyprus
- Height: 1.83 m (6 ft 0 in)
- Position: Midfielder

Senior career*
Years	Team	Apps	(Gls)
1998–2004	AEL Limassol	90	(17)
2004	Skoda Xanthi	4	(0)
2005–2007	AC Omonia	20	(4)
2009–2010	APEP Pitsilia	30	(2)
2010	Ermis Aradippou	5	(0)
2011–2012	Akritas Chlorakas	0	(0)
2012–	Nikos & Sokratis Erimis	?	(?)

International career
2002–2004	Cyprus	6	(0)
- * Club domestic league appearances and goals as of 3 October 2009

Giorgos Constanti (born 19 September 1980) is a Cypriot footballer who played for Cypriot side Akritas Chlorakas.
