= Ákos Seper =

Hungarian footballer

Personal information
- Full name: Ákos Seper
- Date of birth: 22 July 1979 (age 47)
- Place of birth: Hungary
- Height: 1.90 m (6 ft 3 in)
- Position: Defender

Senior career*
Years	Team	Apps	(Gls)
	Csepreg	–	(–)
1999–2001	Szombathelyi Haladás	9	(1)
2000–2003	Büki TK	29	(0)
2003–2005	Szombathelyi Haladás	18	(0)
2005–2006	APEP Pitsilia	21	(1)
2006–2008	Aris Limassol	42	(1)
2008–2010	Digenis Akritas Morphou	44	(3)
2010–	Omonia Aradippou	14	(0)
- * Club domestic league appearances and goals

Ákos Seper (born 22 July 1979, in Hungary) is a Hungarian football player.
