= Filippos Filippou (footballer) =

Cypriot footballer (born 1975)

Personal information
- Full name: Filippos Filippou
- Date of birth: June 24, 1975 (age 51)
- Place of birth: Limassol, Cyprus
- Height: 1.87 m (6 ft 2 in)
- Position: Defender

Senior career*
Years	Team	Apps	(Gls)
1995–2002	Apollon Limassol	129	(9)
1999	AC Omonia	10	(0)
2002–2006	Olympiakos Nicosia	90	(4)
2006–2007	Nea Salamina	21	(0)
2007	APOP Kinyras Peyias	10	(0)
2008	Atromitos Yeroskipou	12	(0)
2008–2010	Aris Limassol	30	(1)
2010–2011	Chalkanoras Idaliou	16	(6)

International career
1999–2001	Cyprus	7	(0)
- * Club domestic league appearances and goals as of May 8, 2010

Filippos Filippou (Greek: Φίλιππος Φιλίππου; born June 24, 1975, in Limassol) is a retired football player who played as a defender. His former teams are Aris Limassol, Atromitos Yeroskipou, Apollon Limassol, Olympiakos Nicosia, Nea Salamina and APOP Kinyras Peyias.
