= Comboio =

Portuguese footballer

Personal information
- Full name: João Manuel Dinis
- Date of birth: October 13, 1979 (age 47)
- Place of birth: Figueira da Foz, Portugal
- Height: 1.84 m (6 ft 1/2 in)
- Position: Defender

Senior career*
Years	Team	Apps	(Gls)
1999–2000	Mirandense		
2000–2001	Portosantense		
2001–2002	O. Hospital	35	(1)
2002–2003	Ermesinde	26	(0)
2003–2004	Fatima	21	(3)
2004–2005	Alverca	29	(2)
2005	Estoril	8	(0)
2006	Barreirense	10	(0)
2006–2007	Olhanense	4	(0)
2007–2008	Portosantense	26	(0)
2008–2010	Doxa Katokopias	38	(1)
2010–2012	Aris Limassol	34	(4)
2012–2013	Omonia Aradippou	17	(0)
2013	Recreativo Caála	?	(0)
2014–2015	Omonia Aradippou	16	(0)
2014–2015	Elpida Xylofagou	21	(0)
2015–2016	Omonia Aradippou	7	(0)
- * Club domestic league appearances and goals as of October 10, 2015

João Manuel Dinis, commonly known as Comboio, (born 13 October 1979) is a Portuguese football defender playing for Omonia Aradippou. During his stay in Cyprus he played also for Doxa Katokopias, Aris Limassol and Elpida Xylofagou.

Comboio previously played for Alverca, Estoril, Barreirense and Olhanense in the Portuguese Liga de Honra. He left Barreirense to join Olhanense for the 2006–07 season.

He joined Cypriot side Doxa Katokopia before the 2008–09 season.
