= Milton Müller =

Argentine footballer (born 1990)

Personal information
- Full name: Milton Axel Müller
- Date of birth: 28 May 1990 (age 36)
- Place of birth: Rosario, Argentina
- Height: 1.75 m (5 ft 9 in)
- Positions: Midfielder; left-back

Youth career
- 2007–2008: Newell's Old Boys

Senior career*
Years	Team	Apps	(Gls)
2008–2010	AEL	1	(0)
2009–2010	→ Ionikos (loan)	5	(0)
2010	Digenis Morphou		
2010	Latina		
2010–2011	Arezzo		
2011–2012	Sarmiento de Resistencia	10	(0)
2012	Central Córdoba Rosario		
2013	Barnechea	11	(0)
2013–2014	Sportivo Rivadavia	7	(1)
2014–2015	Aldosivi	0	(0)
2016–2017	Boca Unidos		

International career
- Argentina U20
- * Club domestic league appearances and goals

Milton Axel Müller (born 28 May 1990) is an Argentine former professional footballer who played as a midfielder or left-back.

== Career ==
Müller was born in Rosario, Santa Fe. During the 2008–09 season, he had 21 caps and eight goals for AEL Youth Team. Marinos Ouzounidis was very pleased with his success and he promoted him to the first team in the middle of the season, while he was still playing games with the youth team. However, he had no caps with the first team during the 2008-2009 season.

In 2013, Müller moved to Chilean club Barnechea from Central Córdoba de Rosario.

His last clubs were Aldosivi in 2015 and Boca Unidos in 2016.

== Personal life ==
Müller works as a cameraman like his father, Marcelo.

Müller married Cecilia Oriolani, an Argentine entertainment journalist in October 2022.
