= Andrew Esealuka =

Nigerian footballer

Personal information
- Full name: Andrew Esealuka
- Date of birth: December 25, 1985 (age 40)
- Place of birth: Nigeria
- Height: 1.78 m (5 ft 10 in)
- Position: Midfielder

Senior career*
Years	Team	Apps	(Gls)
2008–2009	APEP Pitsilia	7	(0)
2009	Aris Limassol	0	(0)
- * Club domestic league appearances and goals

Andrew Esealuka (born 20 December 1985) is a Nigerian footballer. He played for Aris Limassol.
