= Rodrigo Ribeiro (footballer, born 1978) =

Brazilian footballer

Personal information
- Full name: Rodrigo Rodrigues Ribeiro
- Date of birth: 18 July 1978 (age 48)
- Place of birth: Itaboraí, Brazil
- Height: 1.88 m (6 ft 2 in)
- Position: Centre back

Senior career*
Years	Team	Apps	(Gls)
1999–2000	Associação Desportiva Cabofriense	28	(1)
2000–2003	Sporting Pombal	95	(10)
2003–2004	Barreirense	14	(1)
2004–2005	Portimonense	30	(0)
2005–2008	Vizela	75	(3)
2008–2010	Doxa	56	(5)
2010–2011	Olympiakos Nicosia	27	(1)
2011–2012	Cabofriense	16	(2)
2012	Nea Salamis	8	(0)
2013–2014	Union 05	30	(4)
2014–2020	Jeunesse Canach	138	(12)
- * Club domestic league appearances and goals as of 27 August 2017

Rodrigo Rodrigues Ribeiro (born 18 July 1978 in Itaboraí) is a retired Brazilian professional footballer who played for Luxembourg club FC Jeunesse Canach as a central defender.
