= Christos Charalabous =

Cypriot footballer (born 1981)

Personal information
- Full name: Christos Charalambous
- Date of birth: October 3, 1981 (age 45)
- Place of birth: Limassol, Cyprus
- Height: 1.82 m (6 ft 0 in)
- Position: Midfielder

Team information
- Current team: Omonia 29M (manager)

Youth career
- AEL Limassol

Senior career*
Years	Team	Apps	(Gls)
2000–2002	AEL Limassol	6	(0)
2002–2005	Skoda Xanthi	0	(0)
2003–2004	→Aspida Xanthi (loan)		
2004–2005	→Panthrakikos (loan)	29	(7)
2005–2006	AEL Limassol	6	(0)
2006–2009	Panthrakikos	50	(3)
2009–2010	AEL Limassol	12	(1)
2010–2016	Aris Limassol	99	(4)
2016–2017	Pafos	15	(2)

Managerial career
- 2022: Karmiotissa
- 2023: AEL Limassol
- 2023–2024: Karmiotissa
- 2025–: Omonia 29M
- * Club domestic league appearances and goals as of 20:12, 24 July 2017 (UTC)

Christos Charalabous (Greek: Χρίστος Χαραλάμπους; born October 3, 1981, in Limassol) is a retired Cypriot association football player. He is currently the manager of Omonia 29M
