= Sahr Lahai =

Sierra Leonean footballer

Personal information
- Full name: Sahr Lahai
- Date of birth: April 1, 1984 (age 42)
- Place of birth: Kenema, Sierra Leone
- Height: 5 ft 8 in (1.73 m)
- Position: Defender

Team information
- Current team: Digenis Oroklinis

Senior career*
Years	Team	Apps	(Gls)
2002–2008	Giant FC		
2008–2010	Ethnikos Achnas	34	(1)
2010–2011	Onisilos Sotiras	9	(0)
2011–2013	Digenis Oroklinis	0	(0)

International career^{‡}
	Sierra Leone U-21	5	(0)
2005–present	Sierra Leone		
- * Club domestic league appearances and goals as of 24 May 2010 ‡ National team caps and goals as of 24 May 2009

Sahr Lahai (born April 1, 1984, in Kenema, Sierra Leone) is a Sierra Leonean professional footballer. He is a defender and plays for Digenis Oroklinis in the Cypriot Third Division. He is also a member of the Sierra Leone national football team. He made his international for the Leone Stars in 2005. He was a regular member of the Sierra Leone team that participated at the 2005 Amílcar Cabral Cup (also known as the Zone 2).

Lahai began his football career with Giant F.C. in the Sierra Leone National Premier League in 2003. He signed a contract with Cyprus club Ethnikos Achnas in 2008.
