= Stelios Okkarides =

Cypriot footballer (born 1977)

Personal information
- Full name: Stelios Okkarides
- Date of birth: November 15, 1977 (age 48)
- Place of birth: Nicosia, Cyprus
- Height: 1.80 m (5 ft 11 in)
- Position: Central defender

Youth career
- APOEL

Senior career*
Years	Team	Apps	(Gls)
1997–1998	APOEL	8	(1)
1998–2001	→ Doxa Katokopias (loan)	46	(2)
2001–2007	APOEL	114	(4)
2007–2009	Apollon	29	(1)
2009–2010	Olympiakos Nicosia	21	(1)
2010–2011	Doxa Katokopia	8	(1)

International career^{‡}
2003–	Cyprus	34	(1)
- * Club domestic league appearances and goals as of November 8, 2010 ‡ National team caps and goals as of 10 December 2009

Stelios Okkarides (Greek: Στέλιος Οκκαρίδης) (born November 15, 1977, in Nicosia, Cyprus) is a retired Cypriot football defender who last played for Doxa Katokopia.

He played mainly for APOEL where he stayed for 7 years. He also played for Apollon, Olympiakos Nicosia and for Doxa Katokopias.
