= Theodoros Galanis =

Greek footballer

Personal information
- Full name: Theodoros Drakos Galanis
- Date of birth: 14 July 1980 (age 46)
- Place of birth: Argos, Greece
- Height: 1.87 m (6 ft 1 1/2 in)
- Position: Defender

Youth career
- Panargiakos

Senior career*
Years	Team	Apps	(Gls)
1995–1997	Panetolikos	6	(0)
1997–1999	Panargiakos	0	(0)
1999–2002	Panetolikos	51	(1)
2002–2006	Ethnikos Asteras	62	(0)
2006–2010	APOP Kinyras Peyias	70	(1)
- * Club domestic league appearances and goals

Theodoros Galanis (Greek: Θεόδωρος Γαλάνης, born 14 July 1980) is a Greek footballer. He played for the Cypriot Cup winners, APOP Kinyras Peyias. He started his career from Panetolikos and also played for Panargiakos and Ethnikos Asteras. From 2006 to 2010, he was under contract with APOP Kinyras Peyias, with which he celebrated his first and only title, the Cypriot Cup 2008–09.

== Honours ==
APOP Kinyras

- Cypriot Cup: 2008–09
