= Andrés Rouga =

Venezuelan footballer (born 1982)

Enrique Andrés Rouga
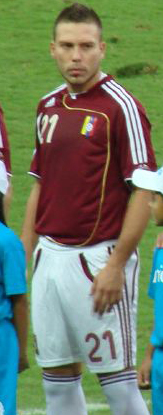
- Ronga at the 2007 Americas Cup

Personal information
- Full name: Enrique Andrés Rouga Rossi
- Date of birth: March 2, 1982 (age 44)
- Place of birth: Caracas, Venezuela
- Height: 1.81 m (5 ft 11 in)
- Position: Defender

Team information
- Current team: UD Las Zocas

Senior career*
Years	Team	Apps	(Gls)
2000–2005	Caracas FC	130	(3)
2005–2006	Junior Barranquilla	16	(0)
2006–2007	Caracas FC	11	(1)
2007–2009	Alki Larnaca	56	(7)
2009–2010	AEL Limassol	10	(1)
2010–2011	Ermis Aradippou		
2010–2013	Deportivo Táchira	79	(5)
2013–2015	Mineros de Guayana	36	(0)
2015	Metropolitanos	9	(1)
2016	Estudiantes de Mérida	12	(0)
2016–2017	Ayia Napa	16	(1)
2017	ASIL Lysi	10	(0)
2018–	UD Las Zocas	0	(0)

International career
2002–2012	Venezuela	32	(0)
- * Club domestic league appearances and goals

Enrique Andrés Rouga (born March 2, 1982) is a Venezuelan footballer, and defender who plays in Spain for UD Las Zocas.

He previously played for both Caracas Fútbol Club and Junior Barranquilla. Rouga played in the 2004 Copa América for the Venezuela national team, and in the 2006 Copa Libertadores for Caracas FC.

In 2007, he was sold to Alki Larnaca FC. On May 30, 2009, he moved to AEL Limassol.

In 2013, Rouga joined the Mineros team, leaving his captaincy at Deportivo Táchira.

== Sources ==
- Beaumont, Nestor (4 March 2006). "Andrés Rouga se esfuerza por un cupo en el exterior" [Andrés Rouga strives for a spot abroad]. El Nacional (in Spanish). ProQuest 336640876.
- Melendez, Jorge Jair (1 July 2004). "Sabor vino tinto" [The flavor of red wine]. Mural (in Spanish). ProQuest 373894968.
- Puerto Ordaz, D.P.J. (12 June 2013). "Rouga reforzará a Mineros" [Rouga will reinforce Mineros]. El Nacional (in Spanish). ProQuest 1366595275.
