= Pedro Duarte (footballer, born 1978) =

Portuguese footballer

Personal information
- Full name: Pedro Miguel Mimoso Duarte
- Date of birth: 22 April 1978 (age 48)
- Place of birth: Setúbal, Portugal
- Height: 1.70 m (5 ft 7 in)
- Position: Left back

Youth career
- 1989–1991: Palmelense
- 1991–1995: Quintajense
- 1995–1997: Barreirense

Senior career*
Years	Team	Apps	(Gls)
1997–2006	Barreirense	164	(22)
1998–1999	→ Montijo (loan)		
2006–2008	Estoril	45	(3)
2008–2010	Doxa	51	(1)
2010–2013	Olympiakos Nicosia	73	(1)
2013–2014	Barreirense	15	(1)
Total		348	(28)
- * Club domestic league appearances and goals

Pedro Miguel Mimoso Duarte (born 22 April 1978 in Setúbal) is a Portuguese retired footballer who played as a left back.
