= Thanasis Kavallaris =

Greek footballer

Personal information
- Full name: Athanasios Kavallaris
- Date of birth: 23 January 1988 (age 38)
- Place of birth: Amfilochia, Greece
- Height: 1.87 m (6 ft 1 1/2 in)
- Position: Striker

Youth career
- 2000–2004: Amfilochos
- –2006: Keratsini

Senior career*
Years	Team	Apps	(Gls)
2005–2006	Keratsini	7	(0)
2006–2007	Nafpaktiakos Asteras	25	(4)
2007–2009	Nea Ionia	55	(27)
2009–2011	AEK Larnaca	22	(4)
2010–2011	→ ASIL (loan)	25	(1)
2011–2012	Thesprotos	24	(13)
2012–2014	A.E.Mesologgion	29	(6)
- * Club domestic league appearances and goals

Thanasis Kavallaris (Greek: Θανάσης Καβαλλάρης, born 23 January 1988) is a Greek footballer. He is a striker.
