= Michalis Fani =

Cypriot footballer (born 1981)

Personal information
- Full name: Michalis Fani
- Date of birth: February 4, 1981 (age 45)
- Place of birth: Limassol, Cyprus
- Height: 1.86 m (6 ft 1 in)
- Position: Goalkeeper

Youth career
- Apollon Limassol

Senior career*
Years	Team	Apps	(Gls)
1998–2008	Apollon Limassol	40	(0)
2005–2006	→ Proodeftiki (loan)	26	(0)
2008–2009	ASIL	24	(0)
2009–2010	APOP Kinyras Peyias	9	(0)
2010–2017	Apollon Limassol	11	(0)
Total		110	(0)
- * Club domestic league appearances and goals as of 2 May 2018

Michalis Fani (born February 4, 1981) is a Cypriot former footballer who played as a goalkeeper.

== Career ==
Fani started his career from Apollon Limassol. Although, he wasn't given many chances to play in the first team. So he was moved on loan to Greek side Proodeftiki F.C. When he returned from Greece, he signed a 1-year contract with the second division's team ASIL Lysi. The following season, he was transferred to APOP Kinyras Peyias FC where he was the main goalkeeper in the European games against SK Rapid Wien for UEFA Europa League.
