= Christos Theophilou =

Cypriot footballer (born 1980)

Personal information
- Date of birth: 30 April 1980 (age 46)
- Place of birth: Limassol, Cyprus
- Height: 1.78 m (5 ft 10 in)
- Position: Defender

Team information
- Current team: Karmiotissa (assistant coach)

Youth career
- Apollon Limassol

Senior career*
Years	Team	Apps	(Gls)
1998–2010	Apollon Limassol	215	(10)
2010–2011	AEK Larnaca	22	(0)
2011–2012	Apollon Limassol	17	(1)
2012–2014	AEL Limassol	32	(2)
2014–2017	Aris Limassol	79	(1)

International career
2005–2013	Cyprus	14	(0)

Managerial career
- 2023–: Karmiotissa (assistant)
- * Club domestic league appearances and goals

Christos Theophilou (Greek: Χρίστος Θεοφίλου; born 30 April 1980) is a Cypriot football coach and a former right defender. He is an assistant coach with Karmiotissa.

== Career ==
Theophilou started his career at Apollon's Academy and he has been the captain of Apollon. On 1 June 2010 he signed a 2-year contract with AEK Larnaca. A year later he returned to Apollon. In July 2012, he signed a two-year contract with 2011-2012 Champions AEL Limassol. Two years later, he joined Aris Limassol, which competes in Cypriot Second Division, in order to assist the club's return to Cypriot First Division. By joining Aris Limassol, became one of the players that have played for three main Limassol teams.
