= Panagiotis Panagiotou (footballer, born 1988) =

Cypriot footballer (born 1988)

Personal information
- Full name: Panagiotis Panagiotou
- Date of birth: 27 September 1988 (age 38)
- Place of birth: Nicosia, Cyprus
- Height: 1.81 m (5 ft 11 in)
- Position: Defender

Team information
- Current team: MEAP Nisou
- Number: 77

Youth career
- APOEL

Senior career*
Years	Team	Apps	(Gls)
2006–2008	APOEL	5	(0)
2008–2010	→Digenis Morphou (loan)	42	(6)
2010–2011	Olympiakos Nicosia	9	(0)
2011–2012	Chalkanoras Idaliou	21	(3)
2012–2013	PAEEK	13	(3)
2013–2015	Othellos Athienou	56	(7)
2015–2017	PAEEK	48	(2)
2017–2018	Othellos Athienou	6	(1)
2018–	MEAP Nisou	26	(3)

International career
2007–2010	Cyprus U21	9	(0)
- * Club domestic league appearances and goals as of 31 May 2019

Panagiotis Panagiotou (Greek: Παναγιώτης Παναγιώτου; born 27 September 1988 in Nicosia, Cyprus) is a Cypriot professional footballer who plays as a full-back for MEAP Nisou in the Cypriot Second Division.

Previously he played for Digenis Morphou on loan from APOEL. He came through APOEL's youth academy. He played in Cyprus national under-21 football team. He had been the top Scorer of U-21 championship of Cyprus with APOEL in season 2006–2007.
