= Moshe Mishaelof =

Israeli footballer

Moshe Mishaelof משה מישאלוף
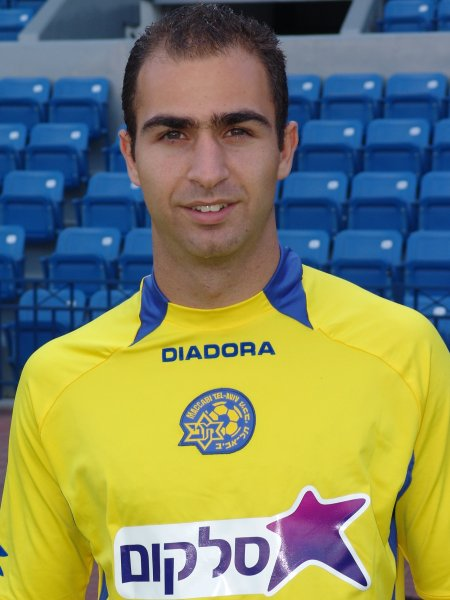
- Mishelof with Maccabi Tel Aviv

Personal information
- Full name: Moshe Mishaelof
- Date of birth: September 14, 1983 (age 43)
- Place of birth: Tel Aviv, Israel
- Height: 1.80 m (5 ft 11 in)
- Position: Defensive midfielder

Youth career
- Maccabi Tel Aviv

Senior career*
Years	Team	Apps	(Gls)
2002–2009	Maccabi Tel Aviv	180	(7)
2009–2010	Apollon Limassol	4	(0)
2010	→ AEP Paphos (on loan)	5	(1)
2010–2011	Beitar Jerusalem	27	(0)
2011–2017	Hapoel Acre	137	(5)
2017–2018	Hapoel Ramat HaSharon	27	(2)
2018–2019	Hapoel Umm al-Fahm	16	(0)

International career
1999–2000	Israel U16	18	(1)
2001	Israel U19	6	(1)
2002–2005	Israel U21	10	(0)
- * Club domestic league appearances and goals

Moshe Mishaelof (Hebrew: משה מישאלוף; born September 14, 1983) is a former Israeli professional football (soccer).

== Career ==
Mishalof played in the youth department of Maccabi Tel Aviv, and was captain of the youth team in the years 2000–2002. Mishalof won two championships and one cup with the youth team, rose to the senior team in 2002 and won the championship with her in the 2002/2003 season. Mishalof was included in the squad of Maccabi Tel Aviv as part of its games in the Champions League. In the 2004/2005 season he won the State Cup with his team, and in the 2008/2009 season he won the Toto Cup with her.

In June 2009 Mishalof signed with Apollon Limassol from the Cypriot Premier League, and in January 2010 he moved to the Paphos team. Mishalof remained in Leumit and in the 2017/2018 season played for Hapoel Ramat Hasharon. In his retirement season, Mishalof played for Hapoel Umm al-Fahm in the first division, and after helping it qualify for the national league, he retired from active play at the age of 35.

In May 2019, at the end of a selection process in which 12 candidates were examined, Mishalof was elected to the position of director general (CEO) of the Israel Football Players Association.

== Honours ==
=== Maccabi Tel Aviv ===
- Israeli Youth Championship (2):
  - 2000–01, 2001–02
- Youth State Cup (1):
  - 2001
- Israeli Premier League (1):
  - 2002–03
- State Cup (1):
  - 2005
- Toto Cup (1):
  - 2008–09
