= Milan Zahálka =

Czech footballer (born 1977)

Personal information
- Date of birth: 17 March 1977 (age 49)
- Place of birth: Ostrov Ohre, Czechoslovakia
- Height: 1.88 m (6 ft 2 in)
- Position: Goalkeeper

Senior career*
Years	Team	Apps	(Gls)
1994–1997	Impruneta	39	(0)
1997–1998	Rondinella	14	(0)
1998–2000	Viareggio	17	(0)
2000–2001	Juve Stabia		
2006	Bohemians 1905	8	(0)
2006	FK Baník Sokolov	0	(0)
2006–2007	Poggibonsi	27	(0)
2007–2008	Gela	10	(0)
2008	Ayia Napa	7	(0)
2009–2010	Omonia Aradippou	34	(0)
2010–2011	Ethnikos Achnas	2	(0)
2011–2012	Chalkanoras Idaliou	0	(0)
- * Club domestic league appearances and goals

Milan Zahálka (born 13 March 1977) is a Czech former professional footballer who played as a goalkeeper.

== Career ==
Zahálka was born in Ostrov Ohre, Czechoslovakia. Between 1994 and 2001, he played football in Italy in the fourth and fifth divisions.

Zahálka joined Bohemians 1905 in February 2006, where he played eight league matches in the Bohemian Football League. He spent the 2010–11 season with Ethnikos Achnas of the Cypriot First Division.
