= Antonis Panagi =

Cypriot footballer (born 1983)

Personal information
- Full name: Antonis Panagi
- Date of birth: August 26, 1983 (age 43)
- Place of birth: Larnaca, Cyprus
- Height: 1.86 m (6 ft 1 in)
- Position: Attacking midfielder

Team information
- Current team: Omonia Aradippou
- Number: 5

Senior career*
| Years | Team | Apps | (Gls) |
| 2005–2006 | Nea Salamina | 43 | (11) |
| 2006–2007 | Apollon Limassol | 7 | (0) |
| 2007–2008 | Alki Larnaca | 6 | (0) |
| 2008–2009 | Olympiakos Nicosia | 17 | (4) |
| 2009–2010 | AEK Larnaca | 6 | (0) |
| 2010–2011 | Nea Salamina | 24 | (3) |
| 2011– | Omonia Aradippou | 91 | (20) |

International career^{‡}
| 2004–2005 | Cyprus U21 | 4 | (1) |
- * Club domestic league appearances and goals as of 31 May 2019 ‡ National team caps and goals as of 11 October 2005

Antonis Panagi (Greek: Αντώνης Παναγή; born 26 August 1983) is a Cypriot football player who currently plays as a midfielder for Omonia Aradippou in the Cypriot Second Division.

He played for Nea Salamina, Apollon Limassol, Alki Larnaca, AEK Larnaca and Olympiakos Nicosia.
