= Carlos Saavedra =

Portuguese footballer

Personal information
- Full name: Carlos Manuel Dias Saavedra
- Date of birth: 1 February 1981 (age 45)
- Place of birth: Lisbon, Portugal
- Height: 1.78 m (5 ft 10 in)
- Position: Midfielder

Youth career
- 1990–1991: Agualva
- 1992–1993: Benfica
- 1993–1995: Estrela Amadora
- 1995–1997: Agualva
- 1997–2000: Estoril

Senior career*
| Years | Team | Apps | (Gls) |
| 2000–2003 | Estoril | 42 | (0) |
| 2003–2004 | Sintrense | 18 | (2) |
| 2004–2007 | Barreirense | 59 | (3) |
| 2006–2007 | → Trofense (loan) | 17 | (0) |
| 2007–2008 | Odivelas | 24 | (1) |
| 2008–2010 | Doxa | 55 | (3) |
| 2010–2011 | AEK Larnaca | 0 | (0) |
| 2010–2011 | → Doxa (loan) | 23 | (0) |
| 2011–2012 | Ermis | 11 | (0) |
| 2012–2013 | Nea Salamis | 32 | (0) |
| 2013–2014 | Glyfada | 5 | (0) |
| 2014–2016 | Loures | 55 | (3) |
| 2016–2019 | Sacavenense | 67 | (5) |
| 2019–2020 | União Santarém | 11 | (1) |
| 2020–2021 | Sacavenense | 16 | (2) |
| 2021–2022 | Alta de Lisboa | 4 | (0) |
| Total | | 439 | (20) |
- * Club domestic league appearances and goals

Carlos Manuel Dias Saavedra (born 1 February 1981) is a Portuguese former footballer who played as a central midfielder.

== Club career ==
Saavedra was born in Lisbon. During his Portuguese career, spent mainly in the lower leagues, he represented G.D. Estoril Praia, S.U. Sintrense, F.C. Barreirense, C.D. Trofense, Odivelas FC, GS Loures, SG Sacavenense (two spells), União de Santarém and União Desportiva Alta de Lisboa. In 2008, he signed a two-year contract with Doxa Katokopias FC from Cyprus.

Saavedra continued in the country after two seasons, joining AEK Larnaca FC who immediately loaned him to his previous club. In the summer of 2014, after one year in Greece with Glyfada FC, the 33-year-old returned to his homeland.
