= Christos Xenofontos =

Cypriot footballer

Personal information
- Full name: Christos Xenofontos
- Date of birth: January 6, 1989 (age 37)
- Place of birth: Larnaca, Cyprus
- Height: 1.87 m (6 ft 2 in)
- Positions: Striker; winger

Youth career
- AEK Larnaca

Senior career*
Years	Team	Apps	(Gls)
2005–2010	AEK Larnaca	33	(3)
2010	→ Othellos Athienou FC (loan)	9	(1)

International career
	Cyprus U19	8	(2)
	Cyprus U21	9	(3)
- * Club domestic league appearances and goals

Christos Xenofontos (Greek: Χρίστος Ξενοφώντος; born January 6, 1989) is a Cypriot former professional soccer player, who played as a striker and midfielder for AEK Larnaca, Othellos Athienou FC, and the Cyprus national football team.

== Biography ==
Xenofontos was born in Larnaca, Cyprus, on 6 January 1989. He did Karate and played basketball and a child, and started playing soccer at the age of nine. Xenofontos obtained his BSc in sport and exercise science from the UCLan Cyprus.

== Career ==
At 15, Xenofontos was his team's first scorer at the U-17 Championship with 33 goals. He was called to division 1 at the age of 16, and was first scorer in the friendly games with 6 goals. Xenofontos started his professional soccer career in 2005 with AEK Larnaca, and remained with the team until 2010. He was on loan with Othellos Athienou FC in 2010. Xenofontos played with the Cyprus U15, U17, U19, and U21 national football teams. He returned to playing with AEK Larnaca, but he was marred by a series of metartarsal injuries. He announced his retirement from soccer at the age of 23. Xenofontos founded the Larnaca-based XTC Fitness in 2016, offering sport scientist-supervised individualized coaching. Among his patrons are national team and international athletes, such as basketball players Alex Antetokounmpo, Nikolaos Stylianou, and Cyprus national football team players Ioannis Kosti, Marios Elia, Nikolas Panayiotou, Andreas Avraam, Nestoras Mytidis, Rafail Mamas, Kyriacos Pavlou, Stavros Tsoukalas, Ioakim Toumpas, among others.
