= Yiannis Demetriou =

Cypriot footballer (born 1989)

Giannis Demetriou
Personal information
- Full name: Ioannis Demetriou
- Date of birth: December 23, 1989 (age 36)
- Place of birth: Limassol, Cyprus
- Height: 1.73 m (5 ft 8 in)
- Positions: Defender; right midfielder

Team information
- Current team: APEA Akrotiri

Senior career*
Years	Team	Apps	(Gls)
2007–2012	Apollon Limassol	6	(0)
2008–2009	→Chalkanoras Idaliou (loan)	15	(0)
2010–2011	→Doxa Katokopias (loan)	14	(0)
2012	→EN Parekklisias (loan)	12	(3)
2012–2013	EN Parekklisias	18	(2)
2013–2015	Karmiotissa Polemidion	36	(3)
2020–	APEA Akrotiri		

International career
2009–2011	Cyprus U21	4	(0)
- * Club domestic league appearances and goals as of 15:37, 2 June 2012 (UTC)

Yiannis Demetriou (Greek: Γιάννης Δημητρίου; born 23 December 1989) is a Cypriot professional footballer who plays for APEA Akrotiri. He is able to play both as a centre back and as a right full back, as well as a right midfielder.

== Club career ==
Demetriou played on loan for Doxa Katokopias during the 2010–11 season. He returned to Apollon and played in two games for the first half of the season before moving in January 2012 to Cypriot Second Division side EN Parekklisias, again on loan. On 1 June 2012 he renewed his loan contract for another year.

On June 1, 2020, he become the statement signing for APEA Akrotiriou in the STOK Elite Division under new owner Jamory Leysner.
