= Pedras (footballer, born 1980) =

Portuguese footballer

Personal information
- Full name: Sérgio André Oliveira da Silva
- Date of birth: 19 September 1980 (age 46)
- Place of birth: Matosinhos, Portugal
- Height: 1.75 m (5 ft 9 in)
- Position: Striker

Youth career
- 1987–1995: Leixões
- 1995–1999: Porto

Senior career*
| Years | Team | Apps | (Gls) |
| 1999–2000 | Porto B | 31 | (13) |
| 2000–2004 | Leixões | 121 | (61) |
| 2004–2005 | Aves | 24 | (1) |
| 2005–2006 | Dragões Sandinenses | 24 | (5) |
| 2006–2007 | Marco | 22 | (10) |
| 2007–2008 | Fiães | 28 | (7) |
| 2008–2009 | Vianense | 31 | (12) |
| 2009–2010 | Olympiakos Nicosia | 28 | (8) |
| 2010–2011 | Tirsense | 15 | (0) |
| 2011–2012 | PAEEK | 21 | (2) |
| 2012–2016 | Leixões | 85 | (14) |
| 2016–2017 | Maia | 36 | (12) |
| 2017–2019 | Leça | 40 | (9) |
| Total | | 506 | (154) |

International career
| 2001 | Portugal U21 | 1 | (0) |
- * Club domestic league appearances and goals

Sérgio André Oliveira da Silva (born 19 September 1980 in Matosinhos), known as Pedras, is a Portuguese former footballer who played as a striker.
