= Andreas Pittaras =

Cypriot footballer (born 1990)

Personal information
- Full name: Andreas Pittaras
- Date of birth: August 3, 1990 (age 36)
- Place of birth: Kornos, Cyprus
- Height: 1.88 m (6 ft 2 in)
- Position: Striker

Team information
- Current team: ASIL Lysi

Youth career
- 2006–2007: ASIL Lysi

Senior career*
Years	Team	Apps	(Gls)
2008–2009	ASIL Lysi	22	(3)
2009–2010	Anorthosis Famagusta FC	0	(0)
2009–2010	→ASIL Lysi (loan)	10	(2)
2010–2011	Ermis Aradippou	0	(0)
2010–2011	→Chalkanoras Idaliou (loan)	23	(9)
2011–2012	Apollon Limassol	0	(0)
2012	Ethnikos Achna	6	(1)
2013	Ermis Aradippou	13	(6)
2013–2014	Nikos & Sokratis Erimis	26	(16)
2014	Kallithea	6	(1)
2015	ASIL Lysi	12	(6)
2015–2016	Othellos Athienou	23	(14)
2016	AEZ Zakakiou	10	(0)
2017–	ASIL Lysi	0	(0)

International career^{‡}
2008	Cyprus U19	3	(2)
2009–2012	Cyprus U21	11	(3)
- * Club domestic league appearances and goals as of 20:08, 29 December 2016 (UTC) ‡ National team caps and goals as of July 5, 2012

Andreas Pittaras (Greek: Ανδρέας Πιτταράς; born August 3, 1990) is a Cypriot football striker who plays for ASIL Lysi.
