= Gutty Sereno =

Portuguese footballer (born 1983)

Personal information
- Full name: Paulo Jorge Fernandes Sereno
- Date of birth: 24 October 1983 (age 43)
- Place of birth: Lisbon, Portugal
- Height: 1.78 m (5 ft 10 in)
- Position: Midfielder

Youth career
- 1992–1995: Casa do Povo de Muge
- 1995–1999: Sporting CP
- 1999–2003: Alverca
- 2000: → Real S.C. (loan)
- 2002–2003: → Benfica (loan)

Senior career*
Years	Team	Apps	(Gls)
2003–2004	Alcains	21	(2)
2004–2006	Abrantes	19	(3)
2006–2007	Kavala	21	(0)
2007–2009	União da Madeira	5	(0)
2009–2010	Monsanto	12	(0)
2010	Doxa Katokopias	7	(1)
2010–2011	Hibernians	3	(0)
2011	Monsanto	12	(0)
2011–2012	Oriental	32	(5)
2012–2013	Torreense	11	(2)
2013	Atlético	14	(1)
2013	BSV Rehden	4	(0)
2014	TB Uphusen		
2015–2018	Vilafranquense	55	(10)
- * Club domestic league appearances and goals as of 9 April 2017

Paulo Jorge Fernandes Sereno (born 24 October 1983), known as Gutty Sereno, is a Portuguese professional footballer who plays for Vilafranquense as a midfielder.

== Career ==
=== Youth and Early Career in Portugal ===
He comes from the youth team of Sporting CP, where he played until the summer of 1999. After that, he moved to the U-19 team of Alverca, from which he was loaned out in July 2000 to the U-19 team of Real S.C. After returning to Alverca, he played there until August 2002, and was then loaned out again, this time to the youth team of Benfica. At the end of this loan, he left the club and moved to the lower-league team Alcains. He played there in the 2003–04 season, after which he joined União da Madeira. His time there lasted only one season, after which he moved to a new club, Abrantes.

=== Stints at Foreign First Division Clubs ===
A season later, he left Portugal for the first time and joined the Greek club Kavala. However, he stayed there only until the end of the season, then returned to Madeira, where he had previously spent a season. He continued in Portugal with GDR Monsanto, playing in the Portuguese third division.

In early 2010, he left his home country again to join the Cypriot first division club Doxa Katokopias, making his league debut on 6 February in a 3–0 away loss against Anorthosis Famagusta. He only made two more appearances by the end of the season. For the 2010/11 season, he moved to Malta to play for Hibernians FC. His first appearance in the Maltese Premier League was in a 1–1 draw against FC Floriana on 4 December 2010. He made only two more appearances by the end of the season.

The next year, he returned to Monsanto until the end of the season. The following season, he joined Clube Oriental de Lisboa, where he played for one season. He spent the first half of the 2012/13 season with SC União Torreense and moved to the then second division club Atlético CP for the second half. He made his debut in a Portuguese professional league in a 0–0 draw at Sporting Lisbon B. After the 2012/13 season, Atlético was relegated and Sereno left the club.

=== Time in Germany and End of Career ===
In the summer, he moved to Germany for the first time, joining BSV Rehden in the Regionalliga Nord. His first appearance was in a 1–1 draw at home against Hannover 96 II, where he was substituted in the 89th minute. He made only three more appearances by the end of the year. On 27 January 2014, he moved within Lower Saxony to the Oberliga team TB Uphusen. He made nine appearances by the end of the season. His first appearance in the Oberliga, as a substitute in the second half, was in a 2–1 loss at 1. FC Wunstorf. In the 2014/15 season, he made nine more appearances before returning to Portugal in January 2015 to end his career.

He played for UD Vilafranquense until the end of the 2017/18 season and then retired.
