= Jiří Mašek =

Czech footballer

Personal information
- Full name: Jiří Mašek
- Date of birth: 5 October 1978 (age 48)
- Place of birth: Mladá Boleslav, Czechoslovakia
- Height: 1.90 m (6 ft 3 in)
- Position: Striker

Team information
- Current team: Oed/Zeillern

Youth career
- 1984–1996: Mladá Boleslav

Senior career*
Years	Team	Apps	(Gls)
1996–1997	Mladá Boleslav		
1997	Jablonec	3	(0)
1997	→ Spolana Neratovice		
1998	→ Český Dub		
1998	→ Spolana Neratovice		
1998–2003	Jablonec	107	(18)
2004–2005	Teplice	56	(16)
2006	Malatyaspor	14	(0)
2006–2007	Wacker Tirol	32	(3)
2007	→ Ankaragücü		
2007–2008	Mladá Boleslav	5	(0)
2008–2009	Ružomberok	25	(5)
2009	Nea Salamis Famagusta	11	(3)
2010	APOP	4	(1)
2010–2011	Viktoria Žižkov	16	(2)
2011–2012	Lokomotive Leipzig	10	(3)
2012–	Oed-Zeillern		
- * Club domestic league appearances and goals as of 15 June 2017

Jiří Mašek (born 5 October 1978 in Czechoslovakia) is a Czech football player. He plays as a striker for USV Oed/Zeillern in Austria.

Mašek played before for Jablonec 97 and Teplice. He also played for Malatyaspor in 2005–06 season in Turkey.
