= APEP FC =

Cypriot football club

APEP
- Full name: Aθλητική Ποδοσφαιρική Ένωση Πιτσιλιάς; Athletic Football Union Pitsilia
- Founded: 1979; 47 years ago
- Ground: Kyperounda Stadium
- Capacity: 6,000
- Chairman: (Cyprus) Andreas Chimonidis
- Manager: (Cyprus) Vassos Melanarkitis
- League: Regional League
- 2025–26: STOK Elite Division , 13th of 16 (relegated)
Home colours	Away colours

APEP (Greek: ΑΠΕΠ; Aθλητική Ποδοσφαιρική Ένωση Πιτσιλιάς, Athlitiki Podosfairiki Enosi Pitsilia, Athletic Football Union Pitsilia) is a Cypriot football club, based in Kyperounta, a village in Pitsilia, which is a region in Limassol District.

== History ==
Founded in 1979, the team has played in First, Second and Third Divisions of Cyprus. The team were second division champions in 1987 and they were promoted to the first division for their first time in their history. They were relegated after their debut season only to return in 1990, 1993 and 1996, each time spending only one season in the first division. After 8 years in lower divisions, APEP were promoted to the Cypriot First Division for the 2005–06 season. However, the team remained second last team in ranking (13th) with 8 points and relegated again in Second Division. The team was promoted to the first division again for the 2008/09 season when it managed to avoid relegation for the first time in its history. It was relegated to the Cypriot Second Division at the end of the 2009/10 season.

== Name history ==
- Athlitiki Podosfairiki Enosi Potamitissas (Greek: Aθλητική Ποδοσφαιρική Ένωση Ποταμίτισσας) or APEP Potamitissas: 1979–1982
- APEP Limassol (Greek: ΑΠΕΠ Λεμεσού) or APEP Limassol: 1982–1990
- Athlitiki Podosfairiki Enosi Pitsilias (Greek: Aθλητική Ποδοσφαιρική Ένωση Πιτσιλιάς) or APEP Pitsilias: 1990–

== Achievements ==
- Cypriot Second Division
  - Winners (1): 1986–87
- Cypriot Third Division
  - Winners (1): 1985–86
