= List of Cypriot football transfers summer 2009 =

This is a list of Cypriot football transfers for the 2009–10 summer transfer window by club. Only transfers of the Cypriot First Division are included.

The summer transfer window opened on 1 June 2009, although a few transfers took place prior to that date. The window closed on 31 August 2009. Players without a club may join one at any time, either during or in between transfer windows.

== Marfin Laiki League ==
=== AEL Limassol ===
In: Note: Flags indicate national team as defined under FIFA eligibility rules; some limited exceptions apply. Players may hold more than one non-FIFA nationality.

No.	Pos.	Nation	Player
82	GK	CYP	Charalambos Kairinos (from APEP Pitsilia)
8	MF	CYP	Christos Charalampous (from (Greece) Panthrakikos)
50	FW	BRA	Serjão (from Doxa Katokopias)
80	FW	CYP	Angelos Efthymiou (from APOP Kinyras Peyias)
21	DF	VEN	Andrés Rouga (from Alki Larnaca)
31	DF	RWA	Hamad Ndikumana (from AC Omonia)
2	DF	POR	Dossa Júnior (from AEP Paphos)
26	MF	BRA	André Caldeira (from AEP Paphos)
89	GK	AUT	Michael Haunschmid (from Austria Lustenau)
20	MF	FRA	Maxim Laroque (from (Greece) OFI)

Out: Note: Flags indicate national team as defined under FIFA eligibility rules; some limited exceptions apply. Players may hold more than one non-FIFA nationality.

No.	Pos.	Nation	Player
2	DF	FRA	Jérémie Rodrigues (to Nea Salamina)
26	MF	SEN	Cheikh Gadiaga (to Ermis Aradippou)
20	DF	ROU	Adrian Iordache (to (Romania) Rapid București)
24	GK	CYP	Demetris Stylianou (to Ethnikos Achna)
18	FW,MF	ROU	Adrian Mihalcea (to Aris Limassol)
23	MF	POR	Joca (to Ermis Aradippou)
17	GK	CMR	Pierre Ebede (released)
4	DF	BEL	Laurent Fassotte (to Enosis Neon Paralimni)
11	MF	CYP	Marios Louka (to Ermis Aradippou)
15	DF	CYP	Kyriakos Pelendritis (to Alki Larnaca)
—	DF	MTN	Moise Kandé (to PAEEK FC)

=== AEP Paphos ===
In: Note: Flags indicate national team as defined under FIFA eligibility rules; some limited exceptions apply. Players may hold more than one non-FIFA nationality.

No.	Pos.	Nation	Player
27	FW	BRA	Gabriel Lima (from Alki Larnaca)
10	MF	ALG	Fadel Brahami (from (Belgium) R.A.E.C. Mons)
11	FW	GEO	Irakliy Geperidze (from (Israel) Hapoel Haifa)
8	MF	ARM	Romik Khachatryan (from (Armenia) Banants Yerevan)
5	DF	ZAM	Moses Sichone (from (Germany) VfR Aalen)
79	FW	POR	Bernardo Vasconcelos (from APOP Kinyras)
26	GK	FRA	Florian Lucchini (from (Bulgaria) Vihren Sandanski)
17	MF	CYP	Giorgos Sielis (from Apollon Limassol)
80	DF	BRA	Anderson (from (Portugal) Vitória F.C.)
99	FW	POR	Tiquinho (from AEK Larnaca)
39	GK	LVA	Artūrs Vaičulis (from Rangers F.C.)

Out: Note: Flags indicate national team as defined under FIFA eligibility rules; some limited exceptions apply. Players may hold more than one non-FIFA nationality.

No.	Pos.	Nation	Player
—	DF	FRA	Jonathan Bru (to (Portugal) Académica Coimbra)
16	FW	POR	Cristovão (to Anorthosis Famagusta)
29	MF	CYP	Giorgos Vasiliou (to Aris Limassol)
8	DF	POR	Dossa Júnior (to AEL Limassol)
30	GK	CYP	Michalis Kokkinos (to Atromitos Yeroskipou)
18	MF	BRA	André Caldeira (to AEL Limassol)
69	DF	POR	Jorge Teixeira (to (Israel) Maccabi Haifa)
99	FW	SEN	Ladji Keita (to (Portugal) Vitória F.C.)
32	MF	GRE	Nikolaos Chatzis (released)
—	DF	POR	Edson Correia (released)
—	MF	POR	Bruno Batista (released)
—	DF	GHA	Godwin Osei Bonsu (released)
29	FW	SRB	Milan Belić (to Ethnikos Achna)

=== Anorthosis ===
In: Note: Flags indicate national team as defined under FIFA eligibility rules; some limited exceptions apply. Players may hold more than one non-FIFA nationality.

No.	Pos.	Nation	Player
29	DF	CYP	Loukas Stylianou (from Doxa Katokopia)
16	FW	POR	Cristovão (from AEP Paphos)
17	FW	CPV	Cafú (from AC Omonia)
15	FW	CYP	Constantinos Mintikkis (loan return from ENTHOI Lakatamia)
23	DF	CYP	Valentinos Sielis (from ENTHOI Lakatamia)
—	FW	CYP	Andreas Pittaras (from ASIL)
7	FW	CYP	Giorgos Tofas (from (Greece) AEK Athens)
6	MF	CYP	Christos Marangos (from Apollon Limassol)
22	DF	CPV	Janício Martins (from (Portugal) Vitória de Setúbal)
10	MF	POR	Ricardo Fernandes (from (Ukraine) Metalurh Donetsk)
27	FW	RSA	Delron Buckley (from (Germany) 1. FSV Mainz 05)
33	FW	CYP	Ioannis Okkas (from AC Omonia)

Out: Note: Flags indicate national team as defined under FIFA eligibility rules; some limited exceptions apply. Players may hold more than one non-FIFA nationality.

No.	Pos.	Nation	Player
6	MF	MNE	Siniša Dobrasinović (to (Greece) Kavala)
3	DF	CYP	Lambros Lambrou (Ermis Aradippou)
5	MF	CYP	Nikos Nicolaou (retired)
31	GK	CYP	Demetris Leoni (to Alki Larnaca)
16	FW	GEO	Klimenti Tsitaishvili (to Nea Salamina)
17	MF	BRA	Sávio (retired)
21	MF	CYP	Giorgos Panagi (to AC Omonia)
19	FW	IRQ	Hawar Taher (to (Iran) Persepolis)
18	MF	ROU	Eugen Trică (to (Romania) CFR Cluj)
23	DF	CYP	Constantinos Samaras (to APOP Kinyras)
27	MF	FRA	Cédric Bardon (to (Bulgaria) Levski Sofia)
—	FW	CYP	Andreas Pittaras (on loan to ASIL)
31	GK	BIH	Nemanja Supić (released)
3	DF	GER	Christian Alder (released)
18	FW	NGA	Victor Agali (to (Greece) Levadiakos)

=== APEP Pitsilia ===
In: Note: Flags indicate national team as defined under FIFA eligibility rules; some limited exceptions apply. Players may hold more than one non-FIFA nationality.

No.	Pos.	Nation	Player
25	MF	CYP	Giorgos Stylianou (from ENTHOI Lakatamia)
5	MF	CYP	Xenios Kyriacou (from Aris Limassol)
70	DF	CYP	Nikos Kanettis (from APEP Pelendriou)
6	DF	URU	Carlos García (from Alki Larnaca)
20	MF	POR	João Paulo (from Atromitos Yeroskipou)
23	MF	HUN	Dániel Kovács (from (Switzerland) FC St. Gallen II)
8	FW	ARG	Francisco Guerrero (from (Switzerland) FC Aarau)
15	DF	AFG	Djelaludin Sharityar (from (Germany) FC Schweinfurt 05)
30	GK	HUN	Dániel Totka (from (Switzerland) FC Wil)
25	MF	IRN	Ali Parhizi (from (Switzerland) FC Kreuzlingen)
11	FW	GER	Fabian Wilhelmsen (from (Germany) Karlsruher SC II)
10	FW	KOS	Sokol Maliqi (from (Switzerland) FC Biel-Bienne)
19	MF	ALB	Clirim Kryeziu (from (Switzerland) FC Kreuzlingen)
50	FW	POR	Hugo Fernandes (loan return from Aris Limassol)
4	DF	ITA	Pasquale Sbarra (from (Switzerland) Grasshopper Club Zürich II)
15	DF	SUI	Kiliann Witschi (from (Switzerland) FC La Chaux-de-Fonds)
27	MF	NED	Pascal Heije (from (Netherlands) RBC Roosendaal)
39	DF	DEN	Peter Gravesen (from (Denmark) Blokhus FC)
9	FW	CYP	Stamatis Pantos (loan from Apollon Limassol)
18	FW	GER	Andy Nägelein (from (Germany) Kickers Emden)

Out: Note: Flags indicate national team as defined under FIFA eligibility rules; some limited exceptions apply. Players may hold more than one non-FIFA nationality.

No.	Pos.	Nation	Player
30	FW	MOZ	Fumo (to Olympiakos Nicosia)
9	FW	BRA	Paulo Vogt (loan return to (Ukraine) FC Metalurg Donetsk)
18	MF	POR	Rui Figueiredo (to Onisilos Sotiras)
2	DF	URU	Bruno Piano (to Atromitos Yeroskipou)
99	FW	TUN	Salema Kasdaoui (to (Tunisia) Stade Tunisien)
7	MF	TUN	Sami Gtari (released)
90	FW	SEN	Salif Keita (released)
28	FW	NGA	David Opara (to AEK Larnaca)
82	GK	CYP	Charalambos Kairinos (to AEL Limassol)
6	MF	CYP	Doros Aresti (released)
3	DF	BEN	John Glélé (released)
5	MF	SWE	Björn Morgan Enqvist (to (Greece) Veria)
15	MF	CYP	Panayiotis Onisiforou (to Ethnikos Achna)
4	DF	CYP	Stelios Longras (to Olympiakos Nicosia)
8	MF	CYP	Constantinos Kissonergis (released)
20	MF	CYP	Efthymios Panayiotou (to Atromitos Yeroskipou)
12	GK	CYP	Marios Stylianou (released)
10	MF	HUN	Attila Szili (to Atromitos Yeroskipou)
31	MF	GHA	Yaw Rush (to Digenis Morphou)
39	MF	FRA	Amadou Sanokho (released)
50	FW	POR	Hugo Fernandes (released)
21	FW	CYP	Antonis Stylianou (on loan)

=== APOEL ===
In: Note: Flags indicate national team as defined under FIFA eligibility rules; some limited exceptions apply. Players may hold more than one non-FIFA nationality.

No.	Pos.	Nation	Player
9	FW	CYP	Andreas Papathanasiou (loan return from Ermis Aradippou)
37	FW	SVK	Mário Breška (from (Germany) 1. FC Nürnberg)
5	DF	MKD	Boban Grnčarov (from (Belgium) K.A.A. Gent)
3	DF	POR	Paulo Jorge (from (Portugal) S.C. Braga)
8	FW	POL	Adrian Sikora (from (Spain) Real Murcia)
77	MF	CYP	Athos Solomou (from Apollon Limassol)

Out: Note: Flags indicate national team as defined under FIFA eligibility rules; some limited exceptions apply. Players may hold more than one non-FIFA nationality.

No.	Pos.	Nation	Player
4	DF	CYP	Paraskevas Christou (to AC Omonia)
5	DF	ROU	Daniel Florea (released)
8	DF	ALG	Bark Seghiri (to (Greece) Panserraikos)
80	FW	NGA	Benjamin Onwuachi (loan return to (Greece) Ionikos)
77	DF	CYP	Panayiotis Panayiotou (On loan to Digenis Morphou)
40	MF	CYP	Giorgos Economides (On loan to Digenis Morphou)

=== Apollon Limassol ===
In: Note: Flags indicate national team as defined under FIFA eligibility rules; some limited exceptions apply. Players may hold more than one non-FIFA nationality.

No.	Pos.	Nation	Player
5	DF	GRE	Giannis Sfakianakis (from APOP Kinyras Peyias)
12	FW	PAR	Aldo Adorno (from AEK Larnaca)
80	FW	CZE	Miroslav Matušovič (from (Czech Republic) Sparta Prague)
18	MF	ISR	Moshe Mishaelof (from (Israel) Maccabi Tel Aviv)
40	GK	GER	Nico Pellatz (from (Germany) SV Werder Bremen)
22	FW	SLE	Mustapha Bangura (on loan from AC Omonia)
3	DF	BRA	Jovaldir Ferreira (from (Bulgaria) Cherno More Varna)
2	DF	POR	António Lopes (from Ethnikos Achna)
37	DF	BRA	Thiago Sales (on loan from (Brazil) Flamengo)
11	MF	ALB	Klodian Duro (from AC Omonia)
9	FW	SRB	Miljan Mrdaković (from (China) Shandong Luneng)
27	MF	ESP	Antonio Núñez (from (Spain) Real Murcia)
15	DF	FRA	Samuel Neva (from (Belgium) F.C. Dender)

Out: Note: Flags indicate national team as defined under FIFA eligibility rules; some limited exceptions apply. Players may hold more than one non-FIFA nationality.

No.	Pos.	Nation	Player
33	GK	CYP	Sofronis Avgousti (to Aris Limassol)
23	DF	GEO	Levan Maghradze (to Ermis Aradippou)
2	DF	SVN	Marko Barun (to Ermis Aradippou)
14	MF	CYP	Christos Marangos (to Anorthosis)
87	FW	CHI	Mauricio Pinilla (to (Italy) U.S. Grosseto)
22	DF	CYP	Stelios Okkarides (to Olympiakos Nicosia)
15	DF	MNE	Duško Đurišić (released)
81	DF	ISL	Haraldur Freyr Guðmundsson (to (Iceland) Keflavík)
87	DF	POR	Diogo Luís (released)
9	FW	URU	Ignacio Risso (to (Uruguay) Defensor Sporting)
20	FW	NGA	Haruna Babangida (to (Russia) Kuban Krasnodar)
90	FW	BRA	David (to Ethnikos Achna)
44	MF	CYP	Giorgos Sielis (to AEP Paphos)
8	MF	CYP	Athos Solomou (to APOEL Nicosia)
25	FW	CYP	Stamatis Pantos (on loan to APEP Pitsilia)
19	FW	CYP	Rafael Yiangoudakis (on loan to APEP Pitsilia)

=== APOP Kinyras Peyias ===
In: Note: Flags indicate national team as defined under FIFA eligibility rules; some limited exceptions apply. Players may hold more than one non-FIFA nationality.

No.	Pos.	Nation	Player
9	FW	CYP	Marios Neophytou (from Olympiakos Nicosia)
31	GK	CYP	Michalis Fani (from Apollon Limassol)
7	MF	CYP	Panayiotis Assiotis (from Aris Limassol)
8	MF	BRA	Fillip Rodrigues Da Silva (from (Greece) PAS Giannina F.C.)
18	DF	CYP	Constantinos Samaras (from Anorthosis FC)
32	FW	CHI	Sebastián González (from (Chile) Colo-Colo)
21	MF	SVN	Zoran Zeljkovič (from (Slovenia) Interblock Ljubljana)
5	DF	SEN	Gora Tall (from (Portugal) Gondomar S.C.)
77	MF	SVN	Dejan Grabič (from (Slovenia) Interblock Ljubljana)
4	MF	WAL	Michael Walsh (from (Wales) Bangor City F.C.)
24	DF	CYP	Pavlos Neophytou (free agent)
19	FW	CMR	Roland Οjong (free agent)

Out: Note: Flags indicate national team as defined under FIFA eligibility rules; some limited exceptions apply. Players may hold more than one non-FIFA nationality.

No.	Pos.	Nation	Player
7	FW	POR	Bernardo Vasconcelos (to AEP Paphos)
8	MF	CIV	Lionel Bah (released)
11	FW	BRA	Eduardo Marques (to Aris Limassol)
3	MF	BRA	Marcio Ferreira (to Aris Limassol)
99	GK	BRA	Alexandre Negri (to AEK Larnaca)
5	DF	GRE	Giannis Sfakianakis (to Apollon Limassol)
30	MF	CYP	Angelos Efthymiou (to AEL Limassol)
22	MF	CYP	Michalis Demetriou (to AEK Larnaca)
70	MF	BRA	Guilherme Weisheimer (to Ermis Aradippou)
15	MF	MAR	Hamid Rhanem (released)
9	FW	BRA	Rafael Jaques (released)
4	DF	AUS	Periklis Moustakas (to ASIL)
19	DF	UKR	Dmytro Mykhailenko (retired)
—	MF	CYP	Charalambos Charalambous (released)
—	GK	IRQ	Mohammed Gassid (released)

=== Aris Limassol ===
In: Note: Flags indicate national team as defined under FIFA eligibility rules; some limited exceptions apply. Players may hold more than one non-FIFA nationality.

No.	Pos.	Nation	Player
6	DF	ROU	Daniel Bălan (on loan from Steaua București)
28	MF	SRB	Ognjen Lekić (from (Slovenia) NK MIK CM Celje)
17	MF	BRA	Eduardo Marques (from APOP Kinyras Peyias)
31	DF	BRA	Marcio Ferreira (from APOP Kinyras Peyias)
10	FW	SRB	Saša Stojanović (from (Netherlands) RBC Roosendaal)
51	GK	CMR	Gilbert N'Djema (from PAEEK FC)
5	DF	GER	Marc Eberle (from (Belgium) K.V.S.K. United)
9	FW	ROU	Adrian Mihalcea (from AEL Limassol)
4	DF	POR	Bruno Pinheiro (from (Portugal) Boavista)
19	MF	CYP	Giorgos Vasiliou (from AEP Paphos)
33	GK	CYP	Sofronis Avgousti (from Apollon Limassol)
32	MF	GRE	Nikos Kounenakis (from (Greece) OFI)

Out: Note: Flags indicate national team as defined under FIFA eligibility rules; some limited exceptions apply. Players may hold more than one non-FIFA nationality.

No.	Pos.	Nation	Player
10	MF	BRA	Bueno Ernandes (released)
1	GK	SVK	Daniel Ondrejicka (to ASIL)
17	MF	CYP	Panayiotis Assiotis (to APOP Kinyras Peyias)
28	GK	CYP	Giorgos Charalambous (on loan to Kissos Kissonerga)
33	MF	CYP	Xenios Kyriacou (to APEP Pitsilia)
27	MF	CYP	Christos Sotiriou (to Omonia Aradippou)
4	DF	GRE	Demetris Ignatiadis (released)
6	DF	CYP	Nicolas Kissonergis (released)
99	FW	CYP	Charalambos Pittakas (to Alki Larnaca)

=== Doxa Katokopia ===
In: Note: Flags indicate national team as defined under FIFA eligibility rules; some limited exceptions apply. Players may hold more than one non-FIFA nationality.

No.	Pos.	Nation	Player
4	DF	BRA	Gilvan (from (Brazil) Gama)
29	MF	POR	Marco Bicho (from (Portugal) Estoril-Praia)
6	MF	GNB	Malá (from (Portugal) Mafra)
30	FW	BRA	Roma (from (Portugal) S.C. Covilhã)
20	FW	POR	Henrique (from (Portugal) Portimonense)
12	GK	CYP	Giorgos Kakoullis (from Digenis Morphou)
51	GK	POR	Márcio Paiva (from (Portugal) Rio Ave)
2	DF	POR	Mangualde (from (Portugal) S.C. Freamunde)

Out: Note: Flags indicate national team as defined under FIFA eligibility rules; some limited exceptions apply. Players may hold more than one non-FIFA nationality.

No.	Pos.	Nation	Player
77	DF	POR	Mario Silva (released)
30	FW	CPV	Mateus (to Frenaros FC 2000)
24	DF	CYP	Loukas Stylianou (to Anorthosis FC)
12	GK	CPV	Ernesto Soares (to (Portugal) A.D. Carregado)
6	MF	CPV	Spencer (to Digenis Morphou)
13	MF	CYP	Georgios Kamarlingos (to MEAP Nisou)
50	FW	BRA	Serjão (to AEL Limassol)
99	GK	CYP	Evagoras Hadjifrangiskou (to Olympiakos Nicosia)
2	DF	POR	Luís Torres (to Ethnikos Achnas)
23	MF	CYP	Giorgos Ioannidis (to Olympiakos Nicosia)
22	MF	ANG	Celson (to (Angola) Recreativo da Caála)

=== Enosis Neon Paralimni ===
In: Note: Flags indicate national team as defined under FIFA eligibility rules; some limited exceptions apply. Players may hold more than one non-FIFA nationality.

No.	Pos.	Nation	Player
4	DF	BEL	Laurent Fassotte (from AEL Limassol)
77	MF	BEL	Rocky Peeters (from (Belgium) Germinal Beerschot)
89	DF	BIH	Ninoslav Milenković (from (Greece) Panserraikos)
5	DF	MKD	Bojan Markovski (from (North Macedonia) FK Vardar)
2	DF	POR	Hugo Simoes (from (Bulgaria) PFC Lokomotiv Mezdra)
21	FW	ZIM	Obadiah Tarumbwa (from (Belgium) Cercle Brugge)
18	FW	MKD	Ivan Tričkovski (on loan from (Serbia) Red Star Belgrade)
8	MF	SRB	Radovan Krivokapić (from (Greece) Veria F.C.)
23	FW	BEL	Dieter Van Tornhout (from (Netherlands) Roda JC)

Out: Note: Flags indicate national team as defined under FIFA eligibility rules; some limited exceptions apply. Players may hold more than one non-FIFA nationality.

No.	Pos.	Nation	Player
50	MF	NGA	Blessing Kaku (released)
37	FW	SVK	Mário Breška (loan return to (Germany) 1. FC Nürnberg)
25	FW	GRE	Alekos Kaklamanos (to (Greece) Rodos F.C.)
31	FW	POR	Luís Miguel (to (Portugal) Gondomar S.C.)
99	FW	GAM	Mustapha Kamal N'Daw (released)
19	FW	CYP	Giorgos Kolokoudias (to Olympiakos Nicosia)
21	MF	CYP	Georgios Kolanis (to Olympiakos Nicosia)
15	DF	NGA	Eric Ejiofor (released)
88	FW	CYP	Stefanos Voskaridis (to Nea Salamina)
2	DF	GHA	Koffi Amponsah (released)
5	DF	SVN	Bekim Kapič (to Ayia Napa FC)
8	DF	ARG	Javier Menghini (to Alki Larnaca)
4	DF	CYP	Marios Karas (to Ayia Napa FC)
11	FW	CYP	Giorgos Nicolaou (to Ayia Napa FC)
—	FW	POL	Adam Czerkas (released)
60	MF	PER	Julio García (released)
14	MF	POR	Alhandra (to (Portugal) Gil Vicente)
9	FW	BRA	Pepe (released)

=== Ermis Aradippou ===
In: Note: Flags indicate national team as defined under FIFA eligibility rules; some limited exceptions apply. Players may hold more than one non-FIFA nationality.

No.	Pos.	Nation	Player
1	GK	BRA	Rodrigo Posso (from (Brazil) Ipatinga)
26	DF	POR	Miguel Oliveira (from (Portugal) Estoril-Praia)
31	GK	CYP	Athos Chrysostomou (from Alki Larnaca)
44	FW	CYP	Antonis Makris (from ASIL)
8	MF	CYP	Nikos Papazachariou (from ASIL)
7	DF	POR	Gilberto (from (Portugal) Boavista)
20	MF	SEN	Cheikh Gadiaga (from AEL Limassol)
23	MF	POR	Joca (from AEL Limassol)
11	MF	SLE	Sheriff Suma (from (Sweden) GAIS)
10	MF	SLV	Eliseo Quintanilla (from (El Salvador) C.D. Águila)
3	DF	CYP	Lambros Lambrou (from Anorthosis FC)
2	DF	SVN	Marko Barun (from Apollon Limassol)
22	DF	POR	Serginho (from (Portugal) Feirense)
15	FW	BRA	Wender (from (Portugal) Belenenses)
9	FW	BRA	Joeano Pinto (from (Portugal) Vitória F.C.)
6	MF	BRA	Guilherme Weisheimer (from APOP Kinyras)
13	FW	NED	Kiran Bechan (from (Netherlands) FC Emmen)
44	MF	CYP	Marios Louka (from AEL Limassol)
17	MF	CYP	Kyriacos Pavlou (on loan from AC Omonoia)
29	DF	FRA	Durant Bruno (free agent)
14	FW	URU	Nicolas Raimondi (from Club Universitario)
16	DF	GEO	Levan Maghradze (from Apollon Limassol)

Out: Note: Flags indicate national team as defined under FIFA eligibility rules; some limited exceptions apply. Players may hold more than one non-FIFA nationality.

No.	Pos.	Nation	Player
—	FW	CYP	Andreas Papathanasiou (loan return to APOEL F.C.)
—	DF	CYP	Michalis Markou (loan return to Alki Larnaca)
—	MF	CYP	Marios Christodoulou (released)
—	MF	POR	Mário Carlos (released)
—	FW	FRA	Ismael Ehui (released)
—	FW	BRA	Alessandro Soares (released)
—	FW	CMR	Jaspa Dipa (to Frenaros FC 2000)
—	GK	ENG	Corrin Brooks-Meade (to Alki Larnaca)
—	GK	HUN	Szabolcs Kemenes (released)
—	DF	CYP	Antonis Kezos (to Ayia Napa FC)
—	FW	CYP	Lefteris Kontolefteros (released)
—	GK	CYP	Spyros Neophytidis (released)
—	DF	CYP	Antonis Konnaris (released)
—	DF	BRA	Alex dos Santos (released)
—	DF	CYP	Makis Papaioannou (retired)
—	DF	CYP	Pavlos Stylianou (released)
—	MF	POR	Paulo Sérgio (released)
—	MF	CYP	Savvas Christodoulou (released)
—	MF	CYP	Marios Kokkinos (released)
—	DF	CYP	Giorgos Kontolefteros (released)
—	DF	CMR	Dezepe Bensa (released)
—	GK	NED	Stefan Postma (released)
—	MF	ROU	Bogdan Andone (released)
—	FW	CYP	Antonis Makris (released)
—	FW	BRA	Rodrigo Dantas (released)

=== Ethnikos Achna ===
In: Note: Flags indicate national team as defined under FIFA eligibility rules; some limited exceptions apply. Players may hold more than one non-FIFA nationality.

No.	Pos.	Nation	Player
16	MF	CYP	Elipidoforos Elia (loan return from Olympiakos Nicosia)
1	GK	MKD	Edin Nuredinoski (from (North Macedonia) FK Milano)
22	GK	CYP	Demetris Stylianou (from AEL Limassol)
18	MF	CYP	Panayiotis Onisiforou (from APEP Pitsilia)
19	DF	CYP	Giorgos Giannakou (from Ayia Napa)
3	DF	POR	João Pedro (from (Portugal) Gil Vicente)
11	FW	BRA	David (from Apollon Limassol)
2	DF	POR	Luís Torres (from Doxa Katokopia)
30	MF	BRA	Kássio (from AEK Larnaca)
27	DF	BRA	Marcelo (free agent)
12	GK	CYP	Andreas Lambrou (loan return)
7	FW	ANG	Edson (from (Portugal) Paços de Ferreira)
17	FW	FRA	Michaël Niçoise (from (Switzerland) Neuchâtel Xamax)
25	FW	SRB	Milan Belić (from AEP Paphos FC)

Out: Note: Flags indicate national team as defined under FIFA eligibility rules; some limited exceptions apply. Players may hold more than one non-FIFA nationality.

No.	Pos.	Nation	Player
19	MF	CYP	Eleftherios Eleftheriou (to Alki Larnaca)
1	GK	MLI	Mahamadou Sidibè (to AC Omonia)
11	FW	GRE	Dimosthenis Manousakis (to (Greece) AO Trikala)
28	MF	SEN	Abdoulaye Niang (released)
18	DF	GHA	Daniel Edusei (released)
22	GK	CYP	Panayiotis Charalambous (released)
17	MF	CYP	Christos Pashialis (released)
7	MF	SRB	Zoran Stjepanović (released)
30	MF	CYP	Panagiotis Engomitis (retired)
2	DF	POR	António Lopes (to Apollon Limassol)
24	FW	CYP	Yiasoumis Yiasoumi (to AEK Larnaca)
12	GK	CYP	Antonis Antoniou (released)

=== Nea Salamina ===
In: Note: Flags indicate national team as defined under FIFA eligibility rules; some limited exceptions apply. Players may hold more than one non-FIFA nationality.

No.	Pos.	Nation	Player
2	MF	NGA	Lewis Aniweta (from Alki Larnaca)
3	DF	BRA	José De Sousa (from Atromitos Yeroskipou)
72	GK	CRO	Sandro Tomić (from (Iran) PAS Hamedan)
9	FW	GEO	Klimenti Tsitaishvili (from Anorthosis FC)
21	DF	CYP	Nikos Nicolaou (from Olympiakos Nicosia)
26	FW	CZE	Jiří Mašek (from (Slovakia) MFK Ružomberok)
15	DF	FRA	Jememie Rodrigues (from AEL Limassol)
79	MF	MOZ	Genito (from (Hungary) Budapest Honvéd)
18	FW	HUN	Norbert Sipos (from (Hungary) Szombathelyi Haladás)
17	FW	HUN	Peter Toth (from (Hungary) MTK Budapest FC)
10	MF	POR	Rui Lima (from (Portugal) Boavista)
1	FW	CYP	Stefanos Voskaridis (from Enosis Neon Paralimni)
33	DF	POR	Vítor Vinha (from (Portugal) Académica)
4	DF	ARG	Fernando Horácio Ávalos (from (Portugal) Belenenses)
41	GK	BRA	Sergio Vitori (from (Brazil) Londrina Esporte Clube)
39	FW	FRA	Fayçal Nini (from (France) Lille OSC)
30	FW	CZE	Tomáš Pešír (from (Poland) Jagiellonia Białystok)

Out: Note: Flags indicate national team as defined under FIFA eligibility rules; some limited exceptions apply. Players may hold more than one non-FIFA nationality.

No.	Pos.	Nation	Player
7	MF	ZIM	Shingayi Kaondera (to Digenis Morphou)
6	DF	CYP	Orthodoxos Ioannou (to AEK Larnaca)
15	DF	CYP	Theofanis Lagos (loan return to AC Omonia)
9	FW	POL	Arkadiusz Aleksander (released)
14	MF	ENG	Ben Rix (released)
19	MF	MAR	Ali El-Omari (to AEK Larnaca)
18	DF	POR	Marco Lança (released)
11	MF	NED	Thijs Sluijter (released)
—	FW	BRA	Matheus Ludescher (released)
17	DF,FW	POR	Tiago Mota (released)
1	GK	SVK	Marek Gála (released)
6	MF	CYP	Andreas Ioannides (retired)
—	MF	HUN	Béla Kovács (released)
—	FW	GAB	Henry Antchouet (released)
—	FW	LVA	Jurģis Kalns (released)
—	FW	ARG	Maximiliano Estévez (released)
18	MF	HUN	Norbert Sipos (released)
30	FW	CZE	Tomáš Pešír (released)
19	FW	POR	Eugenio Neves (released)
28	FW	POR	Sebastião Nogueira (released)

=== Omonia ===
In: Note: Flags indicate national team as defined under FIFA eligibility rules; some limited exceptions apply. Players may hold more than one non-FIFA nationality.

No.	Pos.	Nation	Player
6	MF	CYP	Giorgos Panagi (from Anorthosis FC)
22	MF	GRE	Christos Patsatzoglou (from (Greece) Olympiacos)
5	DF	GRE	Christos Karipidis (from (Scotland) Heart of Midlothian)
7	MF	CYP	Georgios Efrem (from (Scotland) Rangers)
9	FW	POL	Maciej Żurawski (from (Greece) AEL)
10	MF	POR	Bruno Aguiar (from (Scotland) Heart of Midlothian)
27	MF	CYP	Antonis Katsis (from AEK Larnaca)
3	DF	BRA	Davidson Morais (from (Ukraine) Dnipro Dnipropetrovsk)
11	DF	URU	Pablo Cáceres (from (Germany) MSV Duisburg)
38	GK	MLI	Mahamadou Sidibè (from Ethnikos Achna)
20	GK	GRE	Stefanos Kotsolis (from (Greece) AEL)
21	MF	GRE	Anastasios Kyriakos (from (Greece) AEL)
84	DF	CYP	Paraskevas Christou (from APOEL F.C.)
13	MF	CYP	Constantinos Makrides (from (Ukraine) FC Metalurh Donetsk)

Out: Note: Flags indicate national team as defined under FIFA eligibility rules; some limited exceptions apply. Players may hold more than one non-FIFA nationality.

No.	Pos.	Nation	Player
32	FW	SRB	Dušan Đokić (loan return to (Belgium) Club Brugge)
10	MF	CYP	Costas Kaiafas (to Alki Larnaca)
99	FW	CPV	Cafú (to Anorthosis FC)
5	DF	GRE	Demetris Maris (to Alki Larnaca)
3	DF	RWA	Hamad Ndikumana (to AEL Limassol)
20	FW	SLE	Mustapha Bangura (on loan to Apollon Limassol)
9	FW	ARG	Francisco Aguirre (released)
11	MF	CYP	Kyriacos Pavlou (on loan to Ermis Aradippou)
21	MF	ALB	Klodian Duro (to Apollon Limassol)
38	MF	CYP	Elias Vattis (released)
18	DF	POL	Rafal Kosznik (released)
90	GK	CYP	Christos Efstathiou (to Akritas Chlorakas)
25	FW	CYP	Ioannis Okkas (to Anorthosis FC)
29	MF	CYP	Feidias Panayiotou (on loan to Alki Larnaca)
6	DF	CYP	Marcelo Pletsch (to (Serbia) Vojvodina)
—	MF	POR	Paulo Costa (to (Greece) Levadiakos F.C.)
—	DF	CYP	Theofanis Lagos (released)

== See also ==
- List of Belgian football transfers summer 2009
- List of Bulgarian football transfers summer 2009
- List of Danish football transfers summer 2009
- List of Dutch football transfers summer 2009
- List of English football transfers summer 2009
- List of German football transfers summer 2009
- List of Greek football transfers summer 2009
- List of 2009–10 Israeli football transfers
- List of Italian football transfers summer 2009
- List of Maltese football transfers summer 2009
- List of Scottish football transfers 2009–10
- List of Spanish football transfers summer 2009
- List of Ukrainian football transfers summer 2009
