= 2004–05 Cypriot Cup =

Tournament details
- Country: Cyprus
- Dates: 11 September 2004 – 22 May 2005
- Teams: 54

Final positions
- Champions: Omonia (12th title)

The 2004–05 Cypriot Cup was the 63rd edition of the Cypriot Cup. A total of 54 clubs entered the competition. It began on 11 September 2004 with the first round and concluded on 22 May 2005 with the final which was held at GSP Stadium. Omonia won their 12th Cypriot Cup trophy after beating Digenis 2–0 in the final.

== Format ==
In the 2004–05 Cypriot Cup, participated all the teams of the Cypriot First Division, the Cypriot Second Division, the Cypriot Third Division and 12 of the 14 teams of the Cypriot Fourth Division.

The competition consisted of seven rounds. In the first and in the second round each tie was played as a single leg and was held at the home ground of one of the two teams, according to the draw results. Each tie winner was qualifying to the next round. If a match was drawn, extra time was following. If extra time was drawn, the winner was decided by penalty shoot-out.

The third round was played in a two-legged format, each team playing a home and an away match against their opponent. The team which scored more goals on aggregate, was qualifying to the next round. If the two teams scored the same number of goals on aggregate, then the team which scored more goals away from home was advancing to the next round.

If both teams had scored the same number of home and away goals, then extra time was following after the end of the second leg match. If during the extra thirty minutes both teams had managed to score, but they had scored the same number of goals, then the team who scored the away goals was advancing to the next round (i.e. the team which was playing away). If there weren't scored any goals during extra time, the qualifying team was determined by penalty shoot-out.

In the next round, the teams were drawn into four groups of four. The teams of each group played against each other twice, once at their home and once away. The group winners and runners-up of each group advanced to the next round.

The quarter-finals and semi-finals were played over two legs and the same format as in the third round was applied. The final was a single match.

The cup winner secured a place in the 2005–06 UEFA Cup.

== First round ==
In the first round participated all the teams of the Cypriot Second Division and the Cypriot Third Division and 12 of the 14 teams of the Cypriot Fourth Division. The two fourth division teams which were promoted from the 2004 amateur divisions promotion play-offs to the 2004–05 Cypriot Fourth Division after finishing to the second and third place (Digenis Oroklinis and Th.O.I. Avgorou FC) did not participate in the Cypriot Cup. Atromitos Yeroskipou which finished first in the 2004 STOK promotion play-offs, participated in the Cypriot Cup.

Team 1	Score	Team 2
Anagennisi Deryneia (B)	1–0	Adonis Idaliou (C)
Ayia Napa F.C. (B)	2–0	Olympos Xylofagou (D)
Chalkanoras Idaliou (B)	3–1	Enosis Kokkinotrimithia (C)
Sourouklis Troullon (D)	1–2	ASIL Lysi (B)
AEZ Zakakiou (C)	1–2	Onisilos Sotira (B)
Ermis Aradippou (B)	3–2	AEM Mesogis (C)
ENAD Polis Chrysochous FC (C)	3–1	Orfeas Nicosia (C)
Ellinismos Akakiou (D)	3–5	SEK Agiou Athanasiou (C)
AEK Kythreas (C)	1–0	Anagennisi Germasogeias (D)
Elia Lythrodonta (D)	1–3	AOL Omonia Lakatamias (D)
Achyronas Liopetriou (C)	2–0^{1}	Apollon Lympion (D)
Akritas Chlorakas (B)	2–2 (3–4 p)	MEAP Nisou (B)
APEP F.C. (B)	2–1	Doxa Katokopias F.C. (B)
Spartakos Kitiou (D)	3–0	Ethnikos Latsion (D)
ENTHOI Lakatamia FC (B)	10–0	AEK/Achilleas Ayiou Theraponta (C)
Frenaros FC 2000 (D)	2–3	Elpida Xylofagou (C)
Othellos Athienou F.C. (C)	2–2 (8–9 p)	Ethnikos Assia F.C. (B)
Omonia Aradippou (B)	4–0	Anagennisi Lythrodonta (D)
Iraklis Gerolakkou (C)	2–2 (3–4 p)	PAEEK FC (C)
Atromitos Yeroskipou (D)	1–4	APOP Kinyras FC (B)

^{1}Apollon Lympion did not appear in the stadium. Match was awarded 2–0 to Achyronas Liopetriou.

== Second round ==
In the second round participated the winners of the first round ties.

Team 1	Score	Team 2
Anagennisi Deryneia (B)	2–0	Ethnikos Assia F.C. (B)
Elpida Xylofagou (C)	0–1	PAEEK FC (C)
Achyronas Liopetriou (C)	0–2	ENAD Polis Chrysochous FC (C)
APEP F.C. (B)	3–1	AOL Omonia Lakatamias (D)
ASIL Lysi (B)	3–1	AEK Kythreas (C)
Spartakos Kitiou (D)	1–2	Omonia Aradippou (B)
Ermis Aradippou (B)	5–3	Chalkanoras Idaliou (B)
MEAP Nisou (B)	0–2	APOP Kinyras FC (B)
Ayia Napa F.C. (B)	1–0	SEK Agiou Athanasiou (C)
Onisilos Sotira (B)	0–0 (4–5 p)	ENTHOI Lakatamia FC (B)

== Third round ==
In the third round participated the winners of the second round ties and six teams of the Cypriot First Division (the teams which finished 9th, 10th, 11th in the 2003–04 Cypriot First Division and the three teams which promoted from the 2003–04 Cypriot Second Division). The first eight teams of the 2003-04 Cypriot First Division did not participate in this round.

Team 1	Agg.	Team 2	1st leg	2nd leg
AEK Larnaca F.C. (A)	4–3	Nea Salamis Famagusta FC (A)	4–2	0–1
Anagennisi Deryneia (B)	0–6	Olympiakos Nicosia (A)	0–2	0–4
Digenis Akritas Morphou (A)	10–4	ASIL Lysi (B)	7–0	3–4
Ayia Napa F.C. (B)	3–12	Aris Limassol F.C. (A)	2–1	1–11
APEP F.C. (B)	3–3 (a)	Alki Larnaca F.C. (A)	1–1	2–2
APOP Kinyras FC (B)	3–2	ENTHOI Lakatamia FC (B)	2–2	1–0
Omonia Aradippou (B)	4–4 (a)	ENAD (C)	4–2	0–2
Ermis Aradippou (B)	1–5	PAEEK FC (C)	1–2	0–3

== Group stage ==
In the group stage participated the eight winners of the third round ties and the eight teams of the 2004–05 Cypriot First Division which did not participated in the third round, that were the teams which finished in the first eight places in the 2003–04 Cypriot First Division. The first four teams of the 2003–04 Cypriot First Division (APOEL, Omonia, Apollon, AEL) were set heads of each group and the 5th–8th placed teams (Anorthosis, Ethnikos Achna, AEP and Enosis Neon Paralimni) were drawn one per group. The eight teams which advanced from the third round were drawn without limitations.

The teams of each group played against each other twice, once at their home and once away. The group winners and runners-up of each group advanced to the next round.

=== Group A ===
Final table
Pos	Team	Pld	W	D	L	GF	GA	GD	Pts	Qualification
1	APOEL (A)	6	4	1	1	18	5	+13	13	Advanced to Quarter-Finals
2	Enosis Neon Paralimni (A)	6	3	2	1	18	5	+13	11	Advanced to Quarter-Finals
3	APEP (B)	6	3	1	2	10	11	−1	10	
4	PAEEK FC (C)	6	0	0	6	3	28	−25	0	

Rules for classification: 1) Points; 2) Head-to-head points; 3) Head-to-head goal difference; 4) Head-to-head away goals scored; 5) Goal difference; 6) Goals scored.

Results
Home \ Away	APL	ENP	APP	PKK
APOEL		2–1	4–0	7–0
Enosis Neon Paralimni	2–2		3–0	10–0
APEP	2–0	1–1		3–0
PAEEK FC	0–3	0–1	3–4	

Legend: Blue = home team win; Yellow = draw; Red = away team win.

=== Group B ===
Final table
Pos	Team	Pld	W	D	L	GF	GA	GD	Pts	Qualification
1	Apollon Limassol (A)	6	4	0	2	18	14	+4	12	Advanced to Quarter-Finals
2	AEK Larnaca (A)	6	3	1	2	9	8	+1	10 (Note: AEK 1-0 Anorthosis; Anorthosis 2-1 AEK)	Advanced to Quarter-Finals
3	Anorthosis (A)	6	3	1	2	13	8	+5	10	
4	APOP Kinyras (B)	6	0	2	4	6	16	−10	2	

Rules for classification: 1) Points; 2) Head-to-head points; 3) Head-to-head goal difference; 4) Head-to-head away goals scored; 5) Goal difference; 6) Goals scored.
Notes:

Results
Home \ Away	APL	AEK	ANR	APK
Apollon Limassol		4–1	3–2	5–2
AEK Larnaca	4–1		1–0	2–1
Anorthosis	4–1	2–1		4–1
APOP Kinyras	1–4	0–0	1–1	

Legend: Blue = home team win; Yellow = draw; Red = away team win.

=== Group C ===
Final table
Pos	Team	Pld	W	D	L	GF	GA	GD	Pts	Qualification
1	Omonia (A)	6	5	1	0	16	4	+12	16	Advanced to Quarter-Finals
2	Digenis Morphou (A)	6	3	1	2	6	5	+1	10	Advanced to Quarter-Finals
3	Olympiakos Nicosia (A)	6	1	2	3	7	9	−2	5	
4	Ethnikos Achna (A)	6	0	2	4	4	15	−11	2	

Rules for classification: 1) Points; 2) Head-to-head points; 3) Head-to-head goal difference; 4) Head-to-head away goals scored; 5) Goal difference; 6) Goals scored.

Results
Home \ Away	OMN	DGN	OLM	ETH
Omonia		2–1	4–1	5–0
Digenis Morphou	0–2		1–0	2–0
Olympiakos Nicosia	0–0	1–2		4–1
Ethnikos Achna	2–3	0–0	1–1	

Legend: Blue = home team win; Yellow = draw; Red = away team win.

=== Group D ===
Final table
Pos	Team	Pld	W	D	L	GF	GA	GD	Pts	Qualification
1	AEL Limassol (A)	6	5	1	0	18	4	+14	16	Advanced to Quarter-Finals
2	Aris Limassol (A)	6	3	1	2	14	5	+9	10	Advanced to Quarter-Finals
3	AEP Paphos (A)	6	3	0	3	14	9	+5	9	
4	ENAD Polis Chrysochous (C)	6	0	0	6	5	33	−28	0	

Rules for classification: 1) Points; 2) Head-to-head points; 3) Head-to-head goal difference; 4) Head-to-head away goals scored; 5) Goal difference; 6) Goals scored.

Results
Home \ Away	AEL	ARS	AEP	END
AEL Limassol		0–0	3–0	5–1
Aris Limassol	1–2		2–0	9–2
AEP Paphos	1–3	1–0		5–1
ENAD Polis Chrysochous	1–5	0–2	0–7	

Legend: Blue = home team win; Yellow = draw; Red = away team win.

== Quarter-finals ==
In the quarter-finals participated all the teams which qualified from the group stage. The group winners were drawn against the runners-up, with the group winners hosting the second leg. Teams from the same group could not be drawn against each other.

Team 1	Agg.	Team 2	1st leg	2nd leg
Aris Limassol	2–5	APOEL	2–2	0–3
Enosis Neon Paralimni	2–4	Apollon	2–1	0–3
AEK Larnaca	1–3	Omonia	1–2	0–1
Digenis Morphou	4–2	AEL Limassol	4–1	0–1

== Semi-finals ==
Team 1	Agg.	Team 2	1st leg	2nd leg
Apollon	2–5	Omonia	2–2	0–3
APOEL	1–3	Digenis Morphou	0–0	1–3

== Final ==
22 May 2005

Omonia	2–0	Digenis Morphou
Mguni 45'; Papaioannou 74'

GSP Stadium, Nicosia
Attendance: 21,527
Referee: Georgios Papoutsos

Cypriot Cup 2004–05 winners

12th title

== See also ==
- Cypriot Cup
- 2004–05 Cypriot First Division

== Sources ==
- "2004/05 Cyprus Cup". Rec.Sport.Soccer Statistics Foundation. 2016-01-14.
- Papamoiseos, Stelios (2013). Από την ενοποίηση... στα αστέρια [From unification... to the stars] (in Greek). Nicosia: The writer. pp. 130–131.
