= Samir Bengelloun =

French footballer (born 1985)

Personal information
- Full name: Samir Bengelloun
- Date of birth: 2 February 1985 (age 41)
- Place of birth: Paris, France
- Height: 1.80 m (5 ft 11 in)
- Position: Left wing back

Senior career*
| Years | Team | Apps | (Gls) |
| 2003–2005 | Troyes AC | 6 | (0) |
| 2005–2007 | AS Poissy | 16 | (1) |
| 2007–2008 | Levallois SC | - | (-) |
| 2008–2010 | APOP Kinyras Peyias | 36 | (1) |
| 2010–2011 | Lokomotiv Plovdiv | 18 | (0) |
- * Club domestic league appearances and goals as of May 30, 2011

Samir Bengelloun (Arabic: سمير بنجلون, romanized: Samīr Binjallūn; born 2 February 1985) is a French footballer. His older brother Youness formerly played for Bulgarian side Lokomotiv Plovdiv.

In September 2008 Bengelloun joined APOP Kinyras Peyias, with which on 17 May 2009 he won the Cypriot Cup 2008-09.

== Honours ==
- Cypriot Cup:
  - Winners (1): 2009
