= Sébastien Grimaldi =

French footballer (born 1979)

Sebastien Grimaldi
Personal information
- Full name: Sebastien Grimaldi
- Date of birth: 10 September 1979 (age 47)
- Place of birth: Givors, France
- Height: 6 ft 2 in (1.88 m)
- Positions: Central defender; midfielder

Senior career*
Years	Team	Apps	(Gls)
1992–1995	Oullins		
1995–2000	Olympique Lyonnais	34	(1)
2000–2002	Cannes	59	(3)
2002–2005	Angers	90	(4)
2005–2007	Excelsior Mouscron	13	(1)
2007	Chesterfield	12	(0)
2007–2008	Saint-Priest	4	(0)
2008–2010	APOP Kinyras Peyias	52	(2)
- * Club domestic league appearances and goals as of 14 May 2009 (UTC)

Sebastien Grimaldi (born 10 September 1979) is a French footballer who plays primarily as a centre back, though can play in midfield.

Grimaldi began his career with Saint-Romain en gier. In 1992, he moved to Oullins where he stayed until 1995 when he joined the academy of Olympique Lyonnais.

In 2000, Grimaldi moved to Cannes and in 2002 to Angers. He moved to Belgium to play for Excelsior Mouscron in 2005.

He joined Chesterfield on 31 January 2007, making his debut on 3 February 2007 in a 1–0 defeat at home to AFC Bournemouth. He impressed at Saltergate, but an injury meant he left the club in the summer of 2007.

In July 2008, he joined APOP Kinyras Peyias with which on 17 May 2009 he won the Cypriot Cup 2008-09. He had a very good game in final.

== Honours ==
- Cypriot Cup: 2008–09
