= 2004–05 Cypriot Third Division =

Cypriot Third Division
- Season: 2004–05
- Champions: SEK (2nd title)
- Promoted: SEK; Elpida; Iraklis G.
- Relegated: Othellos; Orfeas; AEK/Achilleas
- Matches played: 182
- Goals scored: 630 (3.46 per match)

The 2004–05 Cypriot Third Division was the 34th season of the Cypriot third-level football league. SEK Agiou Athanasiou won their 2nd title.

== Format ==
Fourteen teams participated in the 2004–05 Cypriot Third Division. All teams played against each other twice, once at their home and once away. The team with the most points at the end of the season crowned champions. The first three teams were promoted to the 2005–06 Cypriot Second Division and the last three teams were relegated to the 2005–06 Cypriot Fourth Division.

=== Point system ===
Teams received three points for a win, one point for a draw and zero points for a loss.

== Changes from previous season ==
Teams promoted to 2004–05 Cypriot Second Division

- APOP Kinyras
- MEAP Nisou
- Chalkanoras Idaliou

Teams relegated from 2003–04 Cypriot Second Division

- PAEEK FC
- SEK Agiou Athanasiou
- Enosis Kokkinotrimithia

Teams promoted from 2003–04 Cypriot Fourth Division

- Othellos Athienou
- Achyronas Liopetriou
- ENAD Polis Chrysochous

Teams relegated to 2004–05 Cypriot Fourth Division

- Ethnikos Latsion FC
- Anagennisi Germasogeias
- Sourouklis Troullon

== League standings ==
Pos	Team	Pld	W	D	L	GF	GA	GD	Pts	Promotion or relegation
1	SEK Agiou Athanasiou (C, P)	26	19	2	5	69	19	+50	59	Promoted to Cypriot Second Division
2	Elpida Xylofagou (P)	26	17	4	5	56	23	+33	55	Promoted to Cypriot Second Division
3	Iraklis Gerolakkou (P)	26	16	5	5	48	27	+21	53	Promoted to Cypriot Second Division
4	Adonis Idaliou	26	16	4	6	56	21	+35	52	
5	AEM Mesogis	26	13	6	7	68	30	+38	45	
6	PAEEK FC	26	12	7	7	51	33	+18	43	
7	AEZ Zakakiou	26	11	5	10	44	35	+9	38	
8	AEK Kythreas	26	9	6	11	48	43	+5	33	
9	ENAD Polis Chrysochous	26	8	8	10	30	33	−3	32	
10	Achyronas Liopetriou	26	8	7	11	48	51	−3	31	
11	Enosis Kokkinotrimithia	26	9	4	13	31	34	−3	31	
12	Othellos Athienou (R)	26	9	3	14	43	48	−5	30	Relegated to Cypriot Fourth Division
13	Orfeas Nicosia (R)	26	2	2	22	18	82	−64	8	Relegated to Cypriot Fourth Division
14	AEK/Achilleas Ayiou Theraponta (R)	26	1	1	24	20	151	−131	4	Relegated to Cypriot Fourth Division

Rules for classification: 1) Points, 2) Goal differences, 3) Goals for.
(C) Champions; (P) Promoted; (R) Relegated

== Results ==
Home \ Away	ADN	AEZ	AEK	ACH	AEM	ACL	ELP	ENK	END	IRK	OTL	ORF	PKK	SEK
Adonis		2–1	2–0	6–0	1–0	4–1	0–2	1–0	1–0	2–2	4–1	4–0	0–1	3–1
AEZ	0–1		2–0	6–0	3–1	3–2	3–1	2–2	0–1	0–1	1–3	4–0	2–1	1–1
AEK	1–4	0–1		8–0	0–4	3–1	1–0	0–1	2–2	2–1	2–1	5–0	2–2	0–1
AEK/Achilleas	1–7	1–2	2–6		0–9	2–5	2–10	1–0	0–5	0–2	1–7	2–3	0–2	0–12
AEM	3–1	1–0	6–2	8–0		3–2	2–3	4–1	0–0	0–1	5–2	6–1	3–0	1–2
Achyronas	0–2	2–0	2–2	5–1	2–2		0–2	1–1	1–1	2–0	2–1	4–0	2–2	1–3
Elpida	1–0	3–2	2–0	7–1	1–1	4–0		1–0	0–0	2–0	2–0	5–0	1–1	1–0
Enosis	0–1	2–2	2–1	2–0	1–0	3–1	1–2		1–0	0–0	2–1	4–0	0–2	1–2
ENAD	1–1	3–1	1–1	3–2	1–1	2–3	0–0	1–0		0–2	1–0	3–1	1–2	0–1
Iraklis	1–0	0–0	1–1	8–1	2–5	2–2	4–1	2–1	4–0		4–0	2–0	3–1	1–0
Othellos	1–1	2–3	1–3	4–0	1–1	3–0	2–0	2–0	4–2	0–2		5–2	1–0	0–4
Orfeas	0–6	3–4	0–3	1–1	2–0	0–4	0–2	2–6	0–1	0–1	1–1		0–1	1–2
PAEEK FC	2–2	2–1	2–2	15–1	0–0	2–2	2–3	1–0	3–0	1–2	1–0	2–1		2–0
SEK	1–0	0–0	2–1	8–1	1–2	3–1	1–0	4–0	2–1	6–0	4–0	4–0	4–1	

Legend: Blue = home team win; Yellow = draw; Red = away team win.

== See also ==
- Cypriot Third Division
- 2004–05 Cypriot First Division
- 2004–05 Cypriot Cup

== Sources ==
- "2004/05 Cypriot Third Division". Rec.Sport.Soccer Statistics Foundation. 2016-01-14.
