= 2003–04 Cypriot Cup =

Tournament details
- Country: Cyprus
- Dates: 13 September 2003 – 23 May 2004
- Teams: 54

Final positions
- Champions: AEK Larnaca (1st title)

The 2003–04 Cypriot Cup was the 62nd edition of the Cypriot Cup. A total of 54 clubs entered the competition. It began on 13 September 2003 with the first round and concluded on 23 May 2004 with the final which was held at GSP Stadium. AEK Larnaca won their 1st Cypriot Cup trophy after beating AEL Limassol 2–1 in the final.

== Format ==
In the 2003–04 Cypriot Cup, participated all the teams of the Cypriot First Division, the Cypriot Second Division, the Cypriot Third Division and 12 of the 14 teams of the Cypriot Fourth Division.

The competition consisted of seven rounds. In the first and in the second round each tie was played as a single leg and was held at the home ground of one of the two teams, according to the draw results. Each tie winner was qualifying to the next round. If a match was drawn, extra time was following. If extra time was drawn, the winner was decided by penalty shoot-out.

The third round was played in a two-legged format, each team playing a home and an away match against their opponent. The team which scored more goals on aggregate, was qualifying to the next round. If the two teams scored the same number of goals on aggregate, then the team which scored more goals away from home was advancing to the next round.

If both teams had scored the same number of home and away goals, then extra time was following after the end of the second leg match. If during the extra thirty minutes both teams had managed to score, but they had scored the same number of goals, then the team who scored the away goals was advancing to the next round (i.e. the team which was playing away). If there weren't scored any goals during extra time, the qualifying team was determined by penalty shoot-out.

In the next round, the teams were drawn into four groups of four. The teams of each group played against each other twice, once at their home and once away. The group winners and runners-up of each group advanced to the next round.

The quarter-finals and semi-finals were played over two legs and the same format as in the third round was applied. The final was a single match.

The cup winner secured a place in the 2004–05 UEFA Cup.

== First round ==
In the first round participated all the teams of the Cypriot Second Division and the Cypriot Third Division and 12 of the 14 teams of the Cypriot Fourth Division. The two fourth division teams which were promoted from the 2003 STOK promotion play-offs to the 2003–04 Cypriot Fourth Division after finishing to the second and third place (Spartakos Kitiou and Th.O.I Filias) did not participate in the Cypriot Cup. ENAD Polis Chrysochous which finished first in the 2003 STOK promotion play-offs, participated in the Cypriot Cup.

Team 1	Score	Team 2
APOP Kinyras FC (C)	8–1	AOL Omonia Lakatamias (D)
Sourouklis Troullon (C)	2–3 (a.e.t.)	MEAP Nisou (C)
Anagennisi Germasogeias (C)	2–1	Akritas Chlorakas (B)
Olympos Xylofagou (D)	6–3 (a.e.t.)	Evagoras Pallikarides Agion Trimithias (D)
Iraklis Gerolakkou (C)	0–4	ASIL Lysi (B)
ATE PEK Ergaton (D)	2–1	Ellinismos Akakiou (D)
Nea Salamis Famagusta FC (B)	8–0	Anagennisi Lythrodonta (D)
PAEEK FC (B)	3–2	ENTHOI Lakatamia FC (B)
Ethnikos Latsion (C)	1–5	Ermis Aradippou (B)
Adonis Idaliou (C)	2–1	AEK/Achilleas Ayiou Theraponta (C)
Apollon Lympion (D)	0–1	SEK Agiou Athanasiou (B)
Alki Larnaca F.C. (B)	6–1	Elpida Xylofagou (C)
Othellos Athienou F.C. (D)	1–2	Chalkanoras Idaliou (C)
ENAD Polis Chrysochous FC (D)	4–4 (4–2 p)	Frenaros FC 2000 (D)
Achyronas Liopetriou (D)	5–1	AEM Mesogis (C)
Elia Lythrodonta (D)	1–2	AEZ Zakakiou (C)
Omonia Aradippou (B)	2–2 (4–3 p)	Enosis Kokkinotrimithia (B)
Ethnikos Assia F.C. (B)	4–1	Ayia Napa F.C. (B)
Orfeas Nicosia (C)	1–4	APEP F.C. (B)
Aris Limassol F.C. (B)	4–2	AEK Kythreas (C)

== Second round ==
In the second round participated the winners of the first round ties.

Team 1	Score	Team 2
Ermis Aradippou (B)	1–0	Ethnikos Assia F.C. (B)
ATE PEK Ergaton (D)	0–4	MEAP Nisou (C)
Adonis Idaliou (C)	2–5	APOP Kinyras FC (C)
Achyronas Liopetriou (D)	0–3	Anagennisi Germasogeias (C)
Nea Salamis Famagusta FC (B)	8–0	APEP F.C. (B)
AEZ Zakakiou(C)	2–0	PAEEK FC (B)
Alki Larnaca F.C. (B)	3–0	ENAD Polis Chrysochous FC (D)
Aris Limassol F.C. (B)	1–0	Chalkanoras Idaliou (C)
ASIL Lysi (B)	3–1	SEK Agiou Athanasiou (B)
Omonia Aradippou (B)	3–2	Olympos Xylofagou (D)

== Third round ==
In the third round participated the winners of the second round ties and six teams of the Cypriot First Division (the teams which finished 9th, 10th, 11th in the 2002–03 Cypriot First Division and the three teams which promoted from the 2002–03 Cypriot Second Division). The first eight teams of the 2002-03 Cypriot First Division did not participate in this round.

Team 1	Agg.	Team 2	1st leg	2nd leg
Digenis Akritas Morphou (A)	1–2	Apollon Limassol (A)	0–1	1–1
Aris Limassol F.C. (B)	3–3 (a)	Nea Salamis Famagusta FC (B)	2–2	1–1
Enosis Neon Paralimni FC (A)	8–0	MEAP Nisou (C)	6–0	2–0
Anagennisi Germasogeias (C)	1–8	Ermis Aradippou (B)	1–1	0–7
Onisilos Sotira (A)	1–0	APOP Kinyras FC (C)	0–0	1–0
AEZ Zakakiou (C)	2–6	Anagennisi Deryneia (A)	2–1	0–5
Alki Larnaca F.C. (B)	4–2	Omonia Aradippou (B)	2–1	2–1
ASIL Lysi (B)	4–4 (a)	Doxa Katokopias F.C. (A)	1–1	3–3

== Group stage ==
In the group stage participated the eight winners of the third round ties and the eight teams of the 2003–04 Cypriot First Division which did not participated in the third round, that were the teams which finished in the first eight places in the 2002–03 Cypriot First Division. The first four teams of the 2002–03 Cypriot First Division (Omonia, Anorthosis, APOEL, Olympiakos) were set heads of each group and the 5th–8th placed teams (AEL, Ethnikos Achna, AEP and AEK) were drawn one per group. The eight teams which advanced from the third round were drawn without limitations.

The teams of each group played against each other twice, once at their home and once away. The group winners and runners-up of each group advanced to the next round.

=== Group A ===
Final table
Pos	Team	Pld	W	D	L	GF	GA	GD	Pts	Qualification
1	AEL (A)	6	4	2	0	10	4	+6	14	Advanced to Quarter-Finals
2	Anorthosis (A)	6	3	2	1	8	6	+2	11	Advanced to Quarter-Finals
3	Nea Salamina (B)	6	1	2	3	9	8	+1	5	
4	Anagennisi (A)	6	1	0	5	8	17	−9	3	

Rules for classification: 1) Points; 2) Head-to-head points; 3) Head-to-head goal difference; 4) Head-to-head away goals scored; 5) Goal difference; 6) Goals scored.

Results
Home \ Away	AEL	ANR	NSL	ANG
AEL		2–0	1–0	2–1
Anorthosis	1–1		1–0	2–1
Nea Salamina	2–2	0–0		6–2
Anagennisi	0–2	2–4	2–1	

Legend: Blue = home team win; Yellow = draw; Red = away team win.

=== Group B ===
Final table
Pos	Team	Pld	W	D	L	GF	GA	GD	Pts	Qualification
1	APOEL (A)	6	4	1	1	12	5	+7	13	Advanced to Quarter-Finals
2	Apollon (A)	6	4	0	2	7	5	+2	12	Advanced to Quarter-Finals
3	Enosis Neon Paralimni (A)	6	2	2	2	6	7	−1	8	
4	AEP Paphos (A)	6	0	1	5	5	13	−8	1	

Rules for classification: 1) Points; 2) Head-to-head points; 3) Head-to-head goal difference; 4) Head-to-head away goals scored; 5) Goal difference; 6) Goals scored.

Results
Home \ Away	APN	APL	ENP	AEP
APOEL		0–1	2–0	3–0
Apollon	1–2		1–0	2–1
Enosis Neon Paralimni	2–2	1–0		2–1
AEP Paphos	1–3	1–2	1–1	

Legend: Blue = home team win; Yellow = draw; Red = away team win.

=== Group C ===
Final table
Pos	Team	Pld	W	D	L	GF	GA	GD	Pts	Qualification
1	Omonia (A)	6	6	0	0	20	5	+15	18	Advanced to Quarter-Finals
2	Ethnikos Achna (A)	6	4	0	2	13	7	+6	12	Advanced to Quarter-Finals
3	ASIL Lysi (B)	6	2	0	4	9	15	−6	6	
4	Alki Larnaca (B)	6	0	0	6	4	19	−15	0	

Rules for classification: 1) Points; 2) Head-to-head points; 3) Head-to-head goal difference; 4) Head-to-head away goals scored; 5) Goal difference; 6) Goals scored.

Results
Home \ Away	OMN	ETH	ASL	ALK
Omonia		1–0	5–0	5–1
Ethnikos Achna	2–3		5–1	2–0
ASIL Lysi	1–2	1–2		3–1
Alki Larnaca	1–4	1–2	0–3	

Legend: Blue = home team win; Yellow = draw; Red = away team win.

=== Group D ===
Final table
Pos	Team	Pld	W	D	L	GF	GA	GD	Pts	Qualification
1	Olympiakos Nicosia (A)	6	4	2	0	16	4	+12	14	Advanced to Quarter-Finals
2	AEK Larnaca (A)	6	3	3	0	8	3	+5	12	Advanced to Quarter-Finals
3	Onisilos Sotira (A)	6	1	2	3	10	14	−4	5	
4	Ermis Aradippou (B)	6	0	1	5	7	20	−13	1	

Rules for classification: 1) Points; 2) Head-to-head points; 3) Head-to-head goal difference; 4) Head-to-head away goals scored; 5) Goal difference; 6) Goals scored.

Results
Home \ Away	OLM	AEK	ONS	ERM
Olympiakos Nicosia		1–1	4–0	3–2
AEK Larnaca	0–0		2–0	2–1
Onisilos Sotira	1–3	1–1		5–1
Ermis Aradippou	0–5	0–2	3–3	

Legend: Blue = home team win; Yellow = draw; Red = away team win.

== Quarter-finals ==
In the quarter-finals participated all the teams which qualified from the group stage. The group winners were drawn against the runners-up, with the group winners hosting the second leg. Teams from the same group could not be drawn against each other.

Team 1	Agg.	Team 2	1st leg	2nd leg
Apollon	2–4	AEL Limassol	2–2	0–2
Ethnikos Achna	3–4	Olympiakos	1–0	2–4
AEK Larnaca	5–4	Omonia	3–3	2–1
Anorthosis	1–2	APOEL	0–1	1–1

== Semi-finals ==
Team 1	Agg.	Team 2	1st leg	2nd leg
AEK Larnaca	2–2 (a)	Olympiakos Nicosia	1–0	1–2
AEL Limassol	4–0	APOEL	2–0	2–0^{1}

^{1}The match APOEL-AEL abandoned at 1–0 in 83' after the referee was hit by an object that was thrown from the APOEL section of the crowd. It awarded 0–2 to AEL.

== Final ==
23 May 2004

AEK Larnaca	2–1	AEL Limassol
Papaioannou 24', 90'		Boeka-Lisasi 39'

GSP Stadium, Nicosia
Attendance: 10,558
Referee: Costas Theodotou

Cypriot Cup 2003–04 winners

1st title

== See also ==
- Cypriot Cup
- 2003–04 Cypriot First Division

== Sources ==
- "2003/04 Cyprus Cup". Rec.Sport.Soccer Statistics Foundation. 2016-01-14.
- Papamoiseos, Stelios (2013). Από την ενοποίηση... στα αστέρια [From unification... to the stars] (in Greek). Nicosia: The writer. pp. 130–131.
