= Márcio Ferreira (footballer) =

Brazilian footballer

Marcio Ferreira
Personal information
- Full name: Marcio Ferreira de Souza
- Date of birth: 3 July 1977 (age 49)
- Place of birth: Santo André, Brazil
- Height: 1.71 m (5 ft 7 in)
- Position: Defender

Senior career*
Years	Team	Apps	(Gls)
1999	URT		
2000	Ipatinga		
2001	Mogi Mirim		
2002	Ipatinga		
2003	Caldense		
2003–2004	Colón	6	(0)
2005	Gama		
2006–2009	APOP Kinyras	46	(0)
2009–2010	Aris Limassol	25	(0)
- * Club domestic league appearances and goals

Marcio Ferreira de Souza or simply Marcio Ferreira (born October 3, 1977) is a Brazilian football defender who is naturalized Italian. He last played for Aris Limassol.

== Honours ==
APOP Kinyras

- Cypriot Cup: 2008–09
