= Angelos Efthymiou =

Cypriot footballer and manager (born 1984)

Personal information
- Full name: Angelos Efthymiou
- Date of birth: 18 January 1984 (age 42)
- Place of birth: Paphos, Cyprus
- Height: 1.80 m (5 ft 11 in)
- Position: Midfielder

Team information
- Current team: Akritas Chloraka (head coach)

Youth career
- AEP Paphos

Senior career*
Years	Team	Apps	(Gls)
2004–2007	AEP Paphos	31	(1)
2007	Apollon Limassol	0	(0)
2007–2009	APOP Kinyras	43	(6)
2009–2010	AEL Limassol	16	(0)
2010–2013	AEP Paphos	53	(6)
2013	AEK Kouklia	6	(0)
2014	Akritas Chloraka	10	(3)
Total		159	(16)

International career
2004–2006	Cyprus U21	2	(0)

Managerial career
- 2017–2018: Akritas Chlorakas
- 2019–2020: ASIL Lysi
- 2020–2021: Omonia Aradippou
- 2021: Doxa Katokopias (caretaker)
- 2021–2022: Karmiotissa
- 2022–2024: ASIL Lysi
- 2024: AEZ Zakakiou
- 2024–2025: Anorthosis Famagusta (assistant)
- 2026: Pafos FC U19
- 2026–: Akritas Chlorakas
- * Club domestic league appearances and goals

Angelos Efthymiou (Greek: Άγγελος Ευθυμίου; born 18 January 1984) is a Cypriot football manager and former player who is the head coach of Cypriot Second Division club Akritas Chlorakas.

A midfielder from Paphos, Efthymiou came through the youth system of AEP Paphos and also played for APOP Kinyras, AEL Limassol, AEK Kouklia and Akritas Chlorakas. He scored the opening goal in APOP Kinyras's 2–0 win over AEL in the 2009 Cypriot Cup final, the first major trophy won by a club from the Paphos District.

As a coach, he led Akritas Chlorakas to promotion from the Third Division in 2018, won the Second Division title with Karmiotissa in 2022 and lifted the Cypriot Cup for lower divisions with ASIL Lysi in 2023. He later worked as assistant to Mauro Camoranesi at Anorthosis Famagusta and coached the under-19 side of Pafos FC before returning to Akritas in November 2026.

== Playing career ==
=== AEP Paphos and APOP Kinyras ===
Born in Paphos, Efthymiou came through the youth system of AEP Paphos and broke into the first team in 2004. After a brief spell at Apollon Limassol in 2007, during which he made no competitive appearances, he joined APOP Kinyras of Peyia.

On 16 May 2009, Efthymiou started for APOP Kinyras in the 2008–09 Cypriot Cup final against AEL Limassol at the GSP Stadium in Nicosia. With the match still goalless in the 83rd minute, he flicked the ball over goalkeeper Pierre Ebede to give his side the lead, and Fangio Buyse added a second four minutes later. The 2–0 win gave APOP Kinyras its first Cup title and a place in the UEFA Europa League, and made it the first club from the Paphos District to win a major trophy. Supporters in Peyia took particular pleasure in the fact that the opening goal had come from a Paphos-born player, the Cyprus Mail reported.

=== AEL Limassol and later career ===
Shortly after the final, Efthymiou joined AEL Limassol, the side he had scored against. He returned to AEP Paphos in July 2010 and spent three seasons there. In June 2013, he moved to AEK Kouklia on the recommendation of the club's head coach, Dimitris Ioannou. He ended his playing career at Akritas Chlorakas in 2014.

== Managerial career ==
=== Akritas Chlorakas ===
Efthymiou began his coaching career at Akritas Chlorakas in the summer of 2017. In his first season, the club finished third in the Third Division and won promotion to the Second Division. Akritas also reached the final of the Cup for lower divisions, and before the match Efthymiou said that he wanted his players first to enjoy the occasion and then to win it. The final against champions Onisilos Sotira at the AEK Arena on 5 May 2018 finished 2–2 after extra time, and Onisilos won the penalty shoot-out 4–2.

Akritas began life back in the Second Division with a televised match against Olympiakos Nicosia on 14 September 2018. By early December, a 1–0 win over Omonia Aradippou had taken them to six league wins and 18 points from eleven matches. The club ended its cooperation with Efthymiou on 28 December 2018, after about a year and a half in charge, and Kostas Sokratous succeeded him in January.

=== ASIL Lysi ===
In March 2019, Efthymiou took charge of Second Division club ASIL Lysi and held his first training session on the day of his appointment. Athlitika Press wrote a month later that he had brought a renewed spirit to the dressing room, and after two wins, a draw and a defeat in his first four matches, ASIL stood sixth with 36 points. In June 2019, he agreed to stay until May 2020 and promised to do everything he could to make the club proud.

=== Karmiotissa ===
Efthymiou was appointed head coach of Second Division club Karmiotissa in September 2021 and won his first match in charge on 24 September. He called it a brave victory at a very difficult ground, achieved before the team had trained as much as he would have liked. In January 2022, after a win over Alki Oroklini with several players absent in quarantine because of COVID-19, he dedicated the result to those who had missed it. Karmiotissa went on to win the 2021–22 Second Division and returned to the First Division. In the end-of-season awards of the Pancyprian Footballers' Association, he finished second in the players' vote for coach of the season, one percentage point behind Marinos Satsias.

=== Return to ASIL ===
In July 2022, Efthymiou returned to ASIL, who had dropped into the Third Division. Club president Giorgos Kkailis said that he came back as a champion and was tasked with building a new squad from scratch to win promotion. ASIL finished behind champions Digenis Akritas Morphou and went up to the Second Division. The two clubs, both displaced by the Turkish invasion in 1974, then met in the final of the Cup for lower divisions, ASIL's first appearance in the final. At the AEK Arena on 3 May 2023, goals from Evripidou and Choutris put ASIL 2–0 up before half-time, and they held on to win 2–1 in front of more than 1,000 spectators.

=== AEZ Zakakiou and Anorthosis ===
Efthymiou later took charge of Second Division club AEZ Zakakiou, which parted ways with him on 25 November 2024 after a defeat to Anagennisi Deryneia. Two days later, he became assistant to Mauro Camoranesi, who had been appointed head coach of First Division club Anorthosis Famagusta on a contract until May 2025. By the end of April 2025, Efthymiou had left the club along with Camoranesi, after about five months together. He said that Anorthosis had offered him the chance to stay, but that he had chosen to go with Camoranesi, who wanted Efthymiou alongside him wherever he worked next.

=== Pafos FC and return to Akritas ===
In August 2026, Pafos FC appointed Efthymiou, by then the holder of a UEFA Pro Licence, as deputy director of its academy and head coach of its under-19 side. Ahead of the season, he said that the club had opted for younger and more local players and that part of the job was to prepare them for the first team.

After Akritas Chlorakas removed Jurgen Streppel in October 2026, Efthymiou emerged as the leading candidate to replace him, and he signed as head coach at the start of November. His appointment came as new investors led by Andrea Berlinger-Schwyter prepared a three-year plan aimed at taking the club into the higher divisions.

== Honours ==
=== Player ===
APOP Kinyras

- Cypriot Cup: 2008–09

=== Manager ===
Karmiotissa

- Cypriot Second Division: 2021–22

ASIL Lysi

- Cypriot Cup for lower divisions: 2022–23
