= Giannis Sfakianakis =

Greek footballer

Personal information
- Full name: Giannis Sfakianakis
- Date of birth: 6 February 1976 (age 50)
- Place of birth: Glyfada, Greece
- Height: 1.93 m (6 ft 4 in)
- Position: Defender

Senior career*
Years	Team	Apps	(Gls)
1993–1999	Doxa Vyronas	90	(3)
1996	→ Panegialios (loan)	22	(2)
1999–2002	Athinaikos	72	(3)
2002–2005	Kerkyra	70	(5)
2005	Panachaiki	12	(0)
2006	Akratitos	9	(0)
2006–2007	AEP Paphos	18	(0)
2007–2009	APOP Kinyras	50	(6)
2009–2010	Apollon Limassol	2	(0)
2010	APOP Kinyras	13	(1)
2010	Atromitos Yeroskipou	10	(0)
2011	AEK Kouklia	11	(2)
2011–2013	AO Kassiopi	29	(2)
2013–2014	Sinarades	22	(23)
- * Club domestic league appearances and goals

Giannis Sfakianakis (Greek: Γιάννης Σφακιανάκης; born 6 February 1976) is a Greek professional football defender who has played for several clubs in Greece and Cyprus.

== Career ==
Born in Glyfada, Sfakianakis began playing professional football with Doxa Vyronas F.C. in 1993. He had a loan spell at Panegialios in 1996, before transferring to Athnianikos in 1999.

Sfakianakis helped Athinaikos gain promotion to the Super League Greece for the 2000–01 season. The club were relegation and he left after a season in the second division. Next, he would play for Kerkyra and Akratitos in the Superleague and had a brief spell with Panachaiki in 2005. He moved to Cyprus for the five seasons with AEP Paphos F.C., APOP Kinyras FC, Apollon Limassol FC and Atromitos Yeroskipou, where he would win the 2008–09 Cypriot Cup and 2009–10 Cypriot Cup.

In June 2011, Sfakianakis returned to Greece to play with Corfu-based Cassiopi F.C. in the regional leagues.

== Honours ==
APOP Kinyras

- Cypriot Cup: 2008–09
