= Alain Liri =

Ivorian footballer

Serge-Alain Liri
Personal information
- Full name: Serge-Alain Liri
- Date of birth: 23 March 1979 (age 47)
- Place of birth: Treichville, Abidjan, Ivory Coast
- Height: 1.70 m (5 ft 7 in)
- Position: Forward

Team information
- Current team: APOP Kinyras Peyias
- Number: 31

Youth career
- 1998: Africa Sports National

Senior career*
Years	Team	Apps	(Gls)
1998–1999	GSI Pontivy	13	(3)
1999–2000	FC Lorient B	10	(2)
2000–2001	GSI Pontivy	32	(11)
2001–2002	Tours FC	23	(13)
2002–2005	Sedan	43	(6)
2005–2008	Boulogne	77	(11)
2008–2011	APOP Kinyras Peyias	50	(2)
- * Club domestic league appearances and goals

Serge-Alain Liri (born 23 March 1979 in Treichville, Abidjan) is an Ivorian footballer. He played for APOP Kinyras Peyias in Cyprus.

== Honours ==
APOP Kinyras

- Cypriot Cup: 2008–09
