= 2003–04 Cypriot Third Division =

Cypriot Third Division
- Season: 2003–04
- Champions: APOP Kinyras (1st title)
- Promoted: APOP Kinyras; MEAP; Chalkanoras
- Relegated: Ethnikos L. Anagennisi G. Sourouklis
- Matches played: 181
- Goals scored: 592 (3.27 per match)

The 2003–04 Cypriot Third Division was the 33rd season of the Cypriot third-level football league. APOP Kinyras won their 1st title.

== Format ==
Fourteen teams participated in the 2003–04 Cypriot Third Division. All teams played against each other twice, once at their home and once away. The team with the most points at the end of the season crowned champions. The first three teams were promoted to the 2004–05 Cypriot Second Division and the last three teams were relegated to the 2004–05 Cypriot Fourth Division.

=== Point system ===
Teams received three points for a win, one point for a draw and zero points for a loss.

== Changes from previous season ==
Teams promoted to 2003–04 Cypriot Second Division

- PAEEK FC
- Akritas Chlorakas
- Omonia Aradippou

Teams relegated from 2002–03 Cypriot Second Division

- Chalkanoras Idaliou
- AEK/Achilleas Ayiou Theraponta
- Anagennisi Germasogeias

Teams promoted from 2002–03 Cypriot Fourth Division

- Orfeas Nicosia
- Ethnikos Latsion FC
- AEK Kythreas

Teams relegated to 2003–04 Cypriot Fourth Division

- Othellos Athienou
- Achyronas Liopetriou
- Elia Lythrodonta

Also, before the start of the season, Kinyras Empas and APOP Peyia were merged to form APOP Kinyras, which took the place of Kinyras Empas in the Cypriot Third Division.

== League standings ==
Pos	Team	Pld	W	D	L	GF	GA	GD	Pts	Promotion or relegation
1	APOP Kinyras (C, P)	26	19	3	4	51	22	+29	60	Promoted to Cypriot Second Division
2	MEAP Nisou (P)	26	18	2	6	68	24	+44	56	Promoted to Cypriot Second Division
3	Chalkanoras Idaliou (P)	26	15	4	7	56	27	+29	49	Promoted to Cypriot Second Division
4	Orfeas Nicosia	26	11	6	9	44	42	+2	39	
5	AEZ Zakakiou	26	11	5	10	37	33	+4	38	
6	Elpida Xylofagou	26	9	7	10	34	34	0	34	
7	Adonis Idaliou	26	10	4	12	45	46	−1	34	
8	AEK Kythreas	26	9	7	10	36	42	−6	34	
9	AEK/Achilleas Ayiou Theraponta	25	10	3	12	45	45	0	33 (Note: The game Sourouklis-AEK/Achilleas abandoned at 2–1 in 80' after a fight broke out between the players; game was decided to be void with neither side awarded any points as the CFA considered the abandonment the fault of both clubs.)	
10	Iraklis Gerolakkou	26	9	6	11	42	49	−7	33	
11	AEM Mesogis	26	8	8	10	42	49	−7	32	
12	Ethnikos Latsion FC (R)	26	7	10	9	38	45	−7	31	Relegated to Cypriot Fourth Division
13	Anagennisi Germasogeias (R)	26	5	5	16	34	53	−19	20	Relegated to Cypriot Fourth Division
14	Sourouklis Troullon (R)	25	4	2	19	20	81	−61	14	Relegated to Cypriot Fourth Division

Rules for classification: 1) Points, 2) Goal differences, 3) Goals for.
(C) Champions; (P) Promoted; (R) Relegated

== Results ==
Home \ Away	ADN	AEZ	AEK	ACH	AEM	ANG	APK	ETL	ELP	IRK	MPN	ORF	SRK	CHL
Adonis		2–0	3–0	3–2	3–0	4–2	1–2	2–2	0–0	2–2	3–4	2–1	2–1	4–3
AEZ	0–1		1–0	2–2	2–1	4–1	0–1	2–0	0–1	2–1	1–0	0–0	4–1	0–0
AEK Kythreas	3–1	4–2		1–0	1–1	1–0	0–1	4–1	2–2	3–3	0–4	4–2	2–1	1–2
AEK/Achilleas	2–1	1–0	1–3		3–1	4–2	0–2	3–1	3–0	0–1	2–4	3–2	4–0	2–1
AEM	3–5	1–4	2–2	2–1		1–4	0–3	2–2	2–1	5–2	2–1	3–2	1–1	1–0
Anagennisi	1–0	1–2	0–0	1–3	0–0		2–2	1–1	1–2	1–3	1–2	2–3	5–0	0–4
APOP Kinyras	2–1	3–1	4–0	4–1	0–0	2–0		0–1	3–1	1–0	1–0	2–0	3–0	0–2
Ethnikos	1–1	2–1	1–1	2–2	0–0	1–3	0–4		3–2	1–0	0–2	1–1	9–1	1–0
Elpida	2–0	0–0	0–0	1–1	3–2	2–0	0–1	4–2		1–0	0–2	0–2	3–0	2–2
Iraklis	1–0	1–1	2–1	4–3	2–5	3–2	3–3	1–2	1–3		1–4	2–2	6–1	0–0
MEAP	3–1	4–0	2–0	2–0	1–1	3–0	3–2	3–0	2–2	3–0		5–0	7–0	2–3
Orfeas	3–1	2–1	1–0	2–1	2–1	1–1	2–3	2–2	2–1	1–2	2–0		5–0	2–1
Sourouklis	3–2	1–3	0–3	– (Note: The match between Sourouklis and AEK/Achilleas was abandoned in the 80th minute at 2–1, after a fight broke out between the players; game was decided to be void with neither side awarded any points as the CFA considered the abandonment the fault of both clubs.)	2–4	1–2	0–2	2–2	1–0	2–0	0–4	2–0		0–6
Chalkanoras	3–0	2–4	5–0	3–1	2–1	4–1	4–0	1–0	2–1	0–1	2–1	2–2	2–0	

Legend: Blue = home team win; Yellow = draw; Red = away team win.

== See also ==
- Cypriot Third Division
- 2003–04 Cypriot First Division
- 2003–04 Cypriot Cup

== Sources ==
- "2003/04 Cypriot Third Division". Rec.Sport.Soccer Statistics Foundation. 2016-01-14.
