= 2004–05 Cypriot Second Division =

Cypriot Second Division
- Season: 2004–05
- Champions: APOP Kinyras (1st title)
- Promoted: APOP Kinyras; APEP; THOI
- Relegated: ASIL; Ermis; Akritas
- Matches played: 182
- Goals scored: 532 (2.92 per match)

The 2004–05 Cypriot Second Division was the 50th season of the Cypriot second-level football league. APOP Kinyras won their 1st title.

== Format ==
Fourteen teams participated in the 2004–05 Cypriot Second Division. All teams played against each other twice, once at their home and once away. The team with the most points at the end of the season crowned champions. The first three teams were promoted to 2005–06 Cypriot First Division and the last three teams were relegated to the 2005–06 Cypriot Third Division.

== Changes from previous season ==
Teams promoted to 2004–05 Cypriot First Division

- Nea Salamina
- Aris Limassol
- Alki Larnaca

Teams relegated from 2003–04 Cypriot First Division

- Anagennisi Deryneia
- Onisilos Sotira
- Doxa Katokopias

Teams promoted from 2003–04 Cypriot Third Division

- APOP Kinyras
- MEAP Nisou
- Chalkanoras Idaliou

Teams relegated to 2004–05 Cypriot Third Division

- PAEEK FC
- SEK Agiou Athanasiou
- Enosis Kokkinotrimithia

== League standings ==
Pos	Team	Pld	W	D	L	GF	GA	GD	Pts	Promotion or relegation
1	APOP Kinyras (C, P)	26	17	6	3	70	22	+48	57	Promoted to Cypriot First Division
2	APEP (P)	26	14	7	5	37	22	+15	49	Promoted to Cypriot First Division
3	THOI Lakatamia (P)	26	14	5	7	47	27	+20	47	Promoted to Cypriot First Division
4	Anagennisi Deryneia	26	12	7	7	34	25	+9	43	
5	Ayia Napa	26	11	5	10	37	34	+3	38	
6	Chalkanoras Idaliou	26	10	6	10	43	44	−1	36	
7	Doxa Katokopias	26	10	5	11	32	28	+4	35	
8	Omonia Aradippou	26	9	8	9	39	45	−6	35	
9	Onisilos Sotira	26	9	7	10	38	32	+6	34	
10	MEAP Nisou	26	8	10	8	35	33	+2	34	
11	Ethnikos Assia	26	8	9	9	35	38	−3	33	
12	ASIL Lysi (R)	26	8	5	13	35	49	−14	29	Relegated to Cypriot Third Division
13	Ermis Aradippou (R)	26	5	10	11	31	35	−4	25	Relegated to Cypriot Third Division
14	Akritas Chlorakas (R)	26	2	0	24	19	98	−79	6	Relegated to Cypriot Third Division

Rules for classification: 1) Points, 2) Goal differences, 3) Goal for
(C) Champions; (P) Promoted; (R) Relegated

== Results ==
Home \ Away	ANP	AKR	AND	APP	APK	ASL	DXK	ETH	ERM	THL	MPN	OMN	ONS	CHL
Ayia Napa		2–1	1–0	0–1	3–2	2–0	2–0	1–2	0–0	1–2	1–3	1–0	4–1	5–1
Akritas	1–2		0–2	0–3	1–7	3–1	0–5	3–2	0–2	1–4	0–4	1–4	0–1	0–1
Anagennisi	1–0	8–1		0–2	3–2	1–0	0–1	1–1	1–1	0–0	1–2	1–0	0–1	2–1
APEP	1–0	2–1	1–2		1–0	2–1	1–0	0–0	2–1	1–2	1–1	4–0	5–2	1–0
APOP Kinyras	3–1	5–0	4–0	3–2		7–0	1–1	2–0	3–0	1–0	2–1	7–0	2–1	2–0
ASIL	1–2	5–0	1–4	3–1	1–1		1–0	2–1	2–1	0–2	2–3	2–4	1–3	1–1
Doxa	4–0	4–1	0–1	0–0	2–2	2–0		0–1	2–1	0–1	1–0	1–0	0–2	2–3
Ethnikos	1–1	3–1	1–2	0–1	1–2	2–2	2–0		2–2	3–2	2–1	3–3	2–1	1–1
Ermis	0–0	3–0	0–1	1–1	1–1	0–2	4–0	1–1		1–2	2–0	1–1	1–3	2–2
THOI	2–1	11–1	1–1	0–1	0–4	2–0	2–0	3–1	2–3		1–1	2–0	1–0	3–2
MEAP	1–3	2–1	0–0	1–1	0–0	3–4	0–0	1–1	2–0	1–1		1–1	1–0	1–2
Omonia	3–3	2–0	2–2	0–0	0–2	0–0	1–3	2–0	3–2	1–0	2–2		3–1	1–2
Onisilos	1–1	8–0	0–0	2–0	1–1	0–1	2–2	2–0	0–0	1–1	1–2	1–2		2–1
Chalkanoras	2–0	5–2	2–0	2–2	2–4	2–2	0–2	1–2	2–1	1–0	3–1	3–4	1–1	

Legend: Blue = home team win; Yellow = draw; Red = away team win.

== See also ==
- Cypriot Second Division
- 2004–05 Cypriot First Division
- 2004–05 Cypriot Cup

== Sources ==
- "2004/05 Cypriot Second Division". Rec.Sport.Soccer Statistics Foundation. 2016-01-14.
