= Constantinos Samaras =

Cypriot footballer (born 1984)

Personal information
- Full name: Constantinos Samaras
- Date of birth: May 18, 1984 (age 42)
- Place of birth: Nicosia, Cyprus
- Height: 1.83 m (6 ft 0 in)
- Position: Left back

Team information
- Current team: Olympiakos Nicosia

Youth career
- Anorthosis Famagusta

Senior career*
| Years | Team | Apps | (Gls) |
| 2003–2009 | Anorthosis Famagusta | 79 | (0) |
| 2009–2010 | APOP Kinyras Peyias | 31 | (0) |
| 2011 | Ermis Aradippou | 8 | (0) |
| 2011 | Alki Larnaca | 0 | (0) |
| 2012 | Ethnikos Achna | 10 | (0) |
| 2012–2016 | Ermis Aradippou | 54 | (3) |
| 2015–2016 | → Olympiakos Nicosia (loan) | 2 | (0) |
| 2016– | Olympiakos Nicosia | 67 | (6) |
| 2019–2020 | → Ermis Aradippou (loan) | 18 | (0) |

International career
| 2004–2006 | Cyprus U21 | 7 | (0) |
- * Club domestic league appearances and goals as of 21 May 2020

Constantinos Samaras (Greek: Κωνσταντίνος Σαμάρας; born 18 May 1984 in Nicosia) is a Cypriot footballer who plays for Olympiakos Nicosia as a defender and was the captain of the latter in the 2018–2019 season.

He is a product of the Anorthosis youth academy and he has played there for all of his career except for 6 months (July 2007-January 2008) when he left the club. He rejoined them on the January transfer period With Anorthosis he has won 2 championships and 1 cup.

== Honours ==
=== Club ===
- Cypriot Championship (2): 2005, 2008
- Cypriot Cup (1): 2007
- Cypriot Super Cup (1): 2015
