= Robin Muller van Moppes =

Dutch footballer (born 1984)

Personal information
- Full name: Robin Gerard Jan Muller van Moppes
- Date of birth: 10 May 1984 (age 42)
- Place of birth: Amsterdam, Netherlands
- Height: 1.74 m (5 ft 9 in)
- Position: Midfielder

Youth career
- Ajax

Senior career*
Years	Team	Apps	(Gls)
2006–2008	Oostende	30	(5)
2008–2010	Onisilos Sotira	32	(1)
2010–2011	JOS Watergraafsmeer		
2011–2013	Argon		
2013	HVV Hollandia		
- * Club domestic league appearances and goals as of 7 November 2010

Robin Gerard Jan Muller van Moppes (born 10 May 1984 in Amsterdam) is a Dutch footballer who played in midfield for Cypriot second division side Onisilos Sotira, having previously played for Belgian side, KV Oostende. He also played in the youth of Ajax.
