= Paulinho (footballer, born 1985) =

Portuguese footballer

Personal information
- Full name: Paulo Dinarte Gouveia Pestana
- Date of birth: 30 January 1985 (age 41)
- Place of birth: Funchal, Portugal
- Height: 1.75 m (5 ft 9 in)
- Position: Midfielder

Youth career
- 1994–1996: União Madeira
- 1996–1998: Câmara Lobos
- 1998–2003: Marítimo

Senior career*
Years	Team	Apps	(Gls)
2003–2007	Marítimo B	87	(6)
2004–2006	Marítimo	7	(0)
2007–2008	Onisilos	12	(1)
2008	Progresul București	13	(5)
2009–2011	Astra Ploiești	55	(8)
2012	Concordia Chiajna	6	(3)
2012–2013	Universitatea Cluj	17	(3)
2013	Göztepe	5	(1)
2013–2014	Pandurii	2	(0)
2014	Oțelul Galați	1	(0)
2015	Limianos	10	(2)
2016	Berceni	7	(1)
2018–2019	Câmara de Lobos	5	(1)
2019–2020	Santacruzense		
Total		227	(31)

International career
2003	Portugal U18	2	(0)
2003–2004	Portugal U19	12	(3)
2004	Portugal U20	2	(0)
- * Club domestic league appearances and goals

Paulo Dinarte Gouveia Pestana (born 30 January 1985 in Funchal, Madeira), commonly known as Paulinho, is a Portuguese former professional footballer who played as a midfielder.
