= Tom Kalkhuis =

Dutch footballer (born 1986)

Personal information
- Date of birth: 15 May 1986 (age 40)
- Place of birth: Amsterdam, Netherlands
- Position: Striker

Team information
- Current team: FC Breukelen

Youth career
- –2003: SV Diemen
- 2003–2005: Abcoude
- 2005–2007: Jong AFC Ajax

Senior career*
| Years | Team | Apps | (Gls) |
| 2006–2007 | → FC Omniworld | 21 | (1) |
| 2008 | Onisilos Sotira | | |
| 2009–2010 | FC Chabab | | |
| 2010–2011 | Haaglandia | 23 | (4) |
| 2011– | FC Breukelen | | |
- * Club domestic league appearances and goals as of November 3, 2011

Tom Kalkhuis (born 15 May 1986 in Amsterdam) is a Dutch football player who currently plays for FC Breukelen and previously played for FC Omniworld and Onisilos Sotira.
