= 2003–04 Cypriot Second Division =

Cypriot Second Division
- Season: 2003–04
- Champions: Nea Salamina (4th title)
- Promoted: Nea Salamina; Aris; Alki
- Relegated: PAEEK FC; SEK; Enosis
- Matches played: 182
- Goals scored: 571 (3.14 per match)

The 2003–04 Cypriot Second Division was the 49th season of the Cypriot second-level football league. Nea Salamina won their 4th title.

== Format ==
Fourteen teams participated in the 2003–04 Cypriot Second Division. All teams played against each other twice, once at their home and once away. The team with the most points at the end of the season crowned champions. The first three teams were promoted to 2004–05 Cypriot First Division and the last three teams were relegated to the 2004–05 Cypriot Third Division.

== Changes from previous season ==
Teams promoted to 2003–04 Cypriot First Division

- Anagennisi Deryneia
- Doxa Katokopias
- Onisilos Sotira

Teams relegated from 2002–03 Cypriot First Division

- Nea Salamina
- Aris Limassol
- Alki Larnaca

Teams promoted from 2002–03 Cypriot Third Division

- PAEEK FC
- Akritas Chlorakas
- Omonia Aradippou

Teams relegated to 2003–04 Cypriot Third Division

- Chalkanoras Idaliou
- AEK/Achilleas Ayiou Theraponta
- Anagennisi Germasogeias

== League standings ==
| Pos | Team | Pld | W | D | L | GF | GA | GD | Pts | Promotion or relegation |
|---|---|---|---|---|---|---|---|---|---|---|
| 1 | Nea Salamina (C, P) | 26 | 21 | 3 | 2 | 68 | 23 | +45 | 66 | Promoted to Cypriot First Division |
| 2 | Aris Limassol (P) | 26 | 17 | 5 | 4 | 50 | 21 | +29 | 56 | Promoted to Cypriot First Division |
| 3 | Alki Larnaca (P) | 26 | 16 | 4 | 6 | 53 | 34 | +19 | 52 | Promoted to Cypriot First Division |
| 4 | ASIL Lysi | 26 | 12 | 8 | 6 | 36 | 22 | +14 | 44 | |
| 5 | Akritas Chlorakas | 26 | 12 | 4 | 10 | 46 | 41 | +5 | 40 | |
| 6 | Ethnikos Assia | 26 | 11 | 4 | 11 | 43 | 41 | +2 | 37 | |
| 7 | APEP | 26 | 9 | 7 | 10 | 43 | 46 | −3 | 34 | |
| 8 | Ermis Aradippou | 26 | 8 | 8 | 10 | 40 | 48 | −8 | 32 | |
| 9 | Ayia Napa | 26 | 9 | 4 | 13 | 38 | 56 | −18 | 31 | |
| 10 | Omonia Aradippou | 26 | 8 | 6 | 12 | 36 | 46 | −10 | 30 | |
| 11 | THOI Lakatamia | 26 | 8 | 5 | 13 | 33 | 45 | −12 | 29 | |
| 12 | PAEEK FC (R) | 26 | 7 | 7 | 12 | 41 | 44 | −3 | 28 | Relegated to Cypriot Third Division |
| 13 | SEK Agiou Athanasiou (R) | 26 | 7 | 4 | 15 | 23 | 48 | −25 | 25 | Relegated to Cypriot Third Division |
| 14 | Enosis Kokkinotrimithia (R) | 26 | 0 | 5 | 21 | 21 | 56 | −35 | 5 | Relegated to Cypriot Third Division |

Rules for classification: 1) Points, 2) Goal differences, 3) Goal for
(C) Champions; (P) Promoted; (R) Relegated

== Results ==
| Home \ Away | ANP | AKR | ALK | APP | ARS | ASL | ETH | ENK | ERM | THL | NSL | OMN | PKK | SEK |
|---|---|---|---|---|---|---|---|---|---|---|---|---|---|---|
| Ayia Napa | | 0–0 | 1–3 | 2–1 | 2–1 | 3–1 | 0–1 | 1–1 | 2–0 | 1–1 | 1–5 | 2–0 | 3–2 | 7–1 |
| Akritas | 4–1 | | 2–1 | 0–1 | 2–2 | 2–0 | 5–3 | 1–0 | 6–1 | 3–0 | 2–2 | 2–4 | 2–0 | 0–2 |
| Alki | 6–1 | 3–0 | | 4–3 | 1–2 | 1–1 | 2–0 | 2–1 | 0–4 | 2–1 | 0–4 | 3–1 | 3–1 | 3–0 |
| APEP | 4–2 | 2–3 | 1–0 | | 0–0 | 0–1 | 1–1 | 3–2 | 3–2 | 5–1 | 2–3 | 2–2 | 1–3 | 2–1 |
| Aris | 5–0 | 3–0 | 1–2 | 4–0 | | 0–0 | 2–0 | 3–1 | 2–1 | 3–1 | 1–3 | 5–1 | 1–0 | 2–0 |
| ASIL | 2–0 | 2–0 | 1–1 | 0–0 | 0–2 | | 2–1 | 3–0 | 1–1 | 0–1 | 0–0 | 3–0 | 3–2 | 3–1 |
| Ethnikos Assia | 3–0 | 2–0 | 2–2 | 2–3 | 4–2 | 0–0 | | 3–1 | 5–0 | 1–0 | 0–2 | 2–1 | 0–3 | 4–0 |
| Enosis | 1–3 | 1–2 | 1–1 | 1–1 | 1–2 | 1–4 | 1–2 | | 0–1 | 1–3 | 0–2 | 2–3 | 2–2 | 0–0 |
| Ermis | 3–3 | 3–2 | 1–2 | 2–2 | 0–2 | 1–0 | 2–1 | 4–0 | | 2–2 | 1–4 | 2–2 | 2–2 | 3–0 |
| THOI | 4–0 | 4–2 | 1–3 | 2–1 | 0–1 | 2–2 | 0–4 | 3–1 | 0–2 | | 1–2 | 1–2 | 0–3 | 2–1 |
| Nea Salamina | 3–1 | 2–1 | 4–0 | 2–1 | 1–2 | 1–0 | 1–1 | 2–1 | 3–0 | 2–0 | | 2–1 | 6–1 | 4–1 |
| Omonia | 0–1 | 0–2 | 0–2 | 4–1 | 0–0 | 0–3 | 4–1 | 1–0 | 2–0 | 0–0 | 2–5 | | 1–1 | 3–1 |
| PAEEK FC | 3–1 | 1–2 | 0–2 | 2–3 | 1–1 | 2–3 | 3–0 | 2–1 | 0–0 | 1–1 | 1–2 | 2–2 | | 0–1 |
| SEK Agiou Athanasiou | 1–0 | 1–1 | 0–4 | 0–0 | 0–1 | 0–1 | 4–0 | 2–0 | 2–2 | 0–2 | 2–1 | 1–0 | 1–3 | |

Legend: Blue = home team win; Yellow = draw; Red = away team win.

== See also ==
- Cypriot Second Division
- 2003–04 Cypriot First Division
- 2003–04 Cypriot Cup

== Sources ==
- "2003/04 Cypriot Second Division". Rec.Sport.Soccer Statistics Foundation. 2016-01-14.
