= Kiliann Witschi =

Swiss footballer (born 1985)

Personal information
- Date of birth: 9 November 1985 (age 41)
- Place of birth: Neuchâtel, Switzerland
- Height: 1.83 m (6 ft 0 in)
- Position: Defender

Senior career*
Years	Team	Apps	(Gls)
2006–2007	Neuchâtel Xamax	0	(0)
2007–2009	FC La Chaux-de-Fonds	55	(1)
2009–2010	APEP Pitsilia	10	(0)
2010–2011	FC Chiasso	13	(1)
2011	Karlsruher SC	5	(0)
2011–2013	FC Lugano	41	(2)
2013–2017	Neuchâtel Xamax	34	(1)
- * Club domestic league appearances and goals

Kiliann Witschi (born 9 November 1985) is a Swiss retired professional footballer who played as a defender.
