= Laurent Fassotte =

Belgian football coach and footballer

Personal information
- Date of birth: 31 December 1977 (age 48)
- Place of birth: Verviers, Belgium
- Height: 1.85 m (6 ft 1 in)
- Position: Defender

Team information
- Current team: SKN St. Pölten Frauen (manager)

Senior career*
Years	Team	Apps	(Gls)
1998–1999	Standard Liège	7	(0)
1999–2000	CS Visétois	18	(4)
2000–2002	R.W.D. Molenbeek	65	(11)
2002–2005	Lierse	86	(3)
2005–2007	Sprimont-Comblain Sport	32	(3)
2007–2009	AEL	56	(2)
2009–2011	Enosis Neon Paralimni	40	(1)
2011–2013	Ermis Aradippou	38	(6)
2013–2014	Ayia Napa	17	(3)
Total		359	(33)

Managerial career
- 2021: Apollon Ladies (assistant)
- 2021–2023: Apollon Ladies
- 2024–2025: Apollon Ladies
- 2025–: St. Pölten Frauen
- * Club domestic league appearances and goals

Laurent Fassotte (born 31 December 1977 in Verviers) is a Belgian football coach and former professional footballer who played as a defender in both Belgium and Cyprus. He is the head coach of St. Pölten Frauen.
