= Antonis Makris =

Cypriot footballer (born 1981)

Personal information
- Date of birth: July 1, 1981 (age 45)
- Place of birth: Nicosia, Cyprus
- Position: Forward

Senior career*
Years	Team	Apps	(Gls)
2000–2005	AC Omonia		
2002–2004	→ Doxa Katokopia (loan)		
2005	AEL (loan)		
2005–2006	Kerkyra		
2006–2007	Omonia Aradippou		
2008–2009	ASIL Lysi		
2009–2010	Ermis Aradippou		
- * Club domestic league appearances and goals

Antonis Makris (Greek: Αντώνης Μακρής; born July 1, 1981) is a Cypriot football forward who last played for Ermis Aradippou. He was considered a big talent while playing in AC Omonia. He also played in Greece with AEL and Kerkyra.
