= Zenzo Moyo =

Zimbabwean footballer (born 1975)

Personal information
- Date of birth: 24 December 1975 (age 50)
- Place of birth: Makonde, Zimbabwe
- Height: 1.86 m (6 ft 1 in)
- Position: Forward

Senior career*
Years	Team	Apps	(Gls)
–2000	Highlanders F.C.		
2000–2004	AEP Paphos FC		
2004	Olympiakos Nicosia		
2005	Chalkidona		
2006–2007	Highlanders F.C.		
2008	BMC Lobatse		

International career
1998–2008	Zimbabwe		
- * Club domestic league appearances and goals

Zenzo Moyo (born 24 December 1975) is a retired Zimbabwean football striker.
