= Xenios Kyriacou =

Cypriot footballer (born 1979)

Personal information
- Full name: Xenophon Kyriacou
- Date of birth: December 1, 1979 (age 46)
- Place of birth: Limassol, Cyprus
- Height: 1.77 m (5 ft 9 1/2 in)
- Position: Midfielder

Team information
- Current team: APEP Pitsilia
- Number: 5

Senior career*
Years	Team	Apps	(Gls)
2003–2008	AEL Limassol	90	(1)
2008–2009	Aris Limassol		
2009–present	APEP Pitsilia	4	(0)
- * Club domestic league appearances and goals as of October 11, 2009

Xenios Kyriacou (born December 1, 1979) is a Cypriot footballer. He is currently under contract with the Cypriot side APEP Pitsilia.
