= Marko Barun =

Slovenian footballer

Personal information
- Full name: Marko Barun
- Date of birth: 7 January 1978 (age 48)
- Place of birth: SFR Yugoslavia
- Height: 1.76 m (5 ft 9 1/2 in)
- Position: Defender

Senior career*
Years	Team	Apps	(Gls)
1995–1998	Maribor	5	(0)
1998–2001	Korotan Prevalje	77	(1)
2001–2004	Olimpija	88	(1)
2004–2009	Apollon Limassol	103	(3)
2009–2011	Ermis Aradippou	56	(0)
2012–2013	Aris Limassol	36	(0)
2015	Drava Ptuj	3	(0)

International career
1995-1997	Slovenia U18	3	(1)
1998	Slovenia U20	1	(0)
1998-1999	Slovenia U21	2	(0)
- * Club domestic league appearances and goals

Marko Barun (born 7 January 1978 in Slovenia) is a Slovenian retired professional footballer who last played for Drava Ptuj in the Slovenian third tier.
