= Sebastião Nogueira =

Portuguese footballer

Personal information
- Full name: Sebastião José Lopes de Melo e Nogueira
- Date of birth: 9 September 1988 (age 38)
- Place of birth: Seia, Portugal
- Height: 1.78 m (5 ft 10 in)
- Position: Midfielder

Team information
- Current team: Oriental
- Number: 77

Youth career
- 1997–1999: Académica de Coimbra
- 1999–2007: Sporting CP

Senior career*
Years	Team	Apps	(Gls)
2007–2008	Onisilos Sotira	21	(3)
2008–2010	Nea Salamina	26	(1)
2010–2011	Ermis Aradippou	25	(1)
2012–2013	Futebol Benfica	27	(8)
2013–2014	Oriental	28	(4)
2014–2015	1º Dezembro	30	(2)
2015	Loures	7	(1)
2016	Cova da Piedade	14	(0)
2016–	Oriental	25	(7)
- * Club domestic league appearances and goals as of 9 April 2017

Sebastião José Lopes de Melo e Nogueira (born 9 September 1988) is a Portuguese footballer who plays as a midfielder for Oriental.

== Club career ==
He made his professional debut in the Cypriot First Division for Nea Salamina on 29 August 2009 in a game against Ethnikos Achna.
