= 2003–04 Cypriot First Division =

Cypriot First Division
- Season: 2003–04
- Champions: APOEL (18th title)
- Relegated: Anagennisi; Onisilos; Doxa
- Champions League: APOEL (2nd qualifying round)
- UEFA Cup: Omonia (1st qualifying round); AEK (2nd qualifying round; via Cypriot Cup)
- Intertoto Cup: Ethnikos (1st round)
- Matches: 182
- Goals: 594 (3.26 per match)
- Top goalscorer: Łukasz Sosin (21 goals); Jozef Kožlej (21 goals)

The 2003–04 Cypriot First Division was the 65th season of the Cypriot top-level football league. APOEL won their 18th title.

== Format ==
Fourteen teams participated in the 2003–04 Cypriot First Division. All teams played against each other twice, once at their home and once away. The team with the most points at the end of the season crowned champions. The last three teams were relegated to the 2004–05 Cypriot Second Division.

The champions ensured their participation in the 2004–05 UEFA Champions League and the runners-up in the 2004–05 UEFA Cup.

The teams had to declare their interest to participate in the 2004 UEFA Intertoto Cup before the end of the championship. At the end of the championship, the higher placed team among the interested ones participated in the Intertoto Cup (if they had not secured their participation in any other UEFA competition).

=== Point system ===
Teams received three points for a win, one point for a draw and zero points for a loss.

== Changes from previous season ==
Nea Salamina, Aris Limassol and Alki Larnaca were relegated from previous season and played in the 2003–04 Cypriot Second Division. They were replaced by the first three teams of the 2002–03 Cypriot Second Division, Anagennisi Deryneia, Doxa Katokopias and Onisilos Sotira.

== Stadia and locations ==
2003–04 Cypriot First Division

Team	Stadium
AEK	GSZ Stadium
AEL	Tsirion Stadium
AEP	Pafiako Stadium
Anagennisi	Anagennisi Football Ground
Anorthosis	Antonis Papadopoulos Stadium
APOEL	GSP Stadium
Apollon	Tsirion Stadium
Digenis	Makario Stadium
Doxa	Makario Stadium
Ethnikos	Dasaki Stadium
ENP	Paralimni Stadium
Olympiakos	GSP Stadium
Omonia	GSP Stadium
Onisilos	Paralimni Stadium

== League standings ==
Pos	Team	Pld	W	D	L	GF	GA	GD	Pts	Qualification or relegation
1	APOEL (C)	26	20	5	1	56	20	+36	65	Qualification for Champions League second qualifying round
2	Omonia	26	20	2	4	68	29	+39	62	Qualification for UEFA Cup first qualifying round
3	Apollon Limassol	26	16	1	9	50	23	+27	49	
4	AEL Limassol	26	14	7	5	52	26	+26	49	
5	Anorthosis Famagusta	26	15	3	8	57	35	+22	48	
6	Ethnikos Achna	26	11	5	10	51	37	+14	38	Qualification for Intertoto Cup first round
7	AEP Paphos	26	12	2	12	41	36	+5	38	
8	Enosis Neon Paralimni	26	10	6	10	40	36	+4	36	
9	AEK Larnaca	26	9	5	12	50	52	−2	32	Qualification for UEFA Cup second qualifying round (Note: AEK Larnaca qualified for the UEFA Cup second qualifying round by winning the 2003–04 Cypriot Cup.)
10	Olympiakos Nicosia	26	8	7	11	45	44	+1	31	
11	Digenis Morphou	26	7	7	12	27	38	−11	28	
12	Anagennisi Deryneia (R)	26	4	5	17	15	44	−29	17	Relegation to Cypriot Second Division
13	Onisilos Sotira (R)	26	4	3	19	22	61	−39	15	Relegation to Cypriot Second Division
14	Doxa Katokopias (R)	26	1	4	21	18	111	−93	7	Relegation to Cypriot Second Division

Rules for classification: 1) Points, 2) Goal differences, 3) Goals for.
(C) Champions; (R) Relegated

== Results ==
Home \ Away	AEK	AEL	AEP	ANG	ANR	APN	APL	DGN	DXK	ETH	ENP	OLM	OMN	ONS
AEK		2–2	4–1	2–0	4–3	2–2	0–1	0–1	7–0	2–3	2–3	0–0	2–3	3–1
AEL	4–2		1–0	0–0	3–0	1–1	2–0	5–1	8–0	1–1	1–2	2–1	2–1	4–0
AEP	3–2	0–1		2–2	2–1	0–2	3–1	1–0	5–0	2–0	2–0	3–1	2–2	5–0
Anagennisi	0–1	0–2	1–0		0–2	0–1	0–4	1–1	2–0	0–3	0–1	0–0	1–2	0–2
Anorthosis	4–1	1–1	2–0	1–0		1–1	0–3	2–3	4–0	2–1	3–1	3–1	2–3	1–0
APOEL	5–1	3–1	3–1	4–0	2–0		1–0	1–0	3–3	2–1	2–1	2–1	1–2	3–0
Apollon	4–2	2–0	2–0	0–1	1–2	0–1		2–0	5–1	1–0	3–0	4–1	0–1	3–1
Digenis	1–2	1–3	1–0	4–0	0–3	0–2	0–1		0–0	1–1	1–1	1–4	3–0	4–1
Doxa	2–2	0–2	1–2	0–4	1–10	2–3	0–5	2–1		1–3	0–4	1–1	0–2	1–4
Ethnikos	2–2	2–0	3–1	3–0	0–2	1–3	1–0	1–2	9–0		0–2	5–4	0–3	6–0
ENP	1–3	0–1	0–1	0–0	2–3	1–1	2–1	1–1	6–1	1–1		2–1	2–3	3–1
Olympiakos	3–1	2–2	2–1	4–2	1–1	1–3	3–3	0–0	5–0	0–1	3–1		2–4	1–0
Omonia	3–0	2–1	3–1	4–1	2–1	0–1	1–3	4–0	11–0	3–1	1–1	2–1		3–1
Onisilos	0–1	2–2	1–3	1–0	2–3	0–3	0–1	0–0	3–2	2–2	0–2	0–2	0–3	

Legend: Blue = home team win; Yellow = draw; Red = away team win.

The score of the game Anagennisi-Onisilos was 2-2. Onisilos Sotiras won the appeal they filed in this game due to the irregular participation of a player of Anagennisi Derynia and the match was awarded with a score of 2–0 in their favour.

== Top scorers ==
#	Name	Club	Goals
1	(Slovenia) Jozef Kozlej	Omonia	21
2	(Poland) Łukasz Sosin	Apollon	20
3	(Serbia) Sása Jovanović	AEP	15
4	(Georgia (country)) Levan Kebadze	Enosis	14
5	(Zimbabwe) Zenzo Moyo	AEP	13

Source: soccerboards.com

== Attendances ==
#	Club	Average
1	Omonoia	11,003
2	APOEL	8,387
3	Apollon Limassol	4,953
4	AEL	3,374
5	Anorthosis	2,605
6	Olympiakos Nicosia	1,911
7	AEK Larnaca	1,732
8	AEP	1,664
9	Digenis	1,500
10	Ethnikos Achnas	1,319
11	Doxa Katokopias	1,312
12	ENP	1,081
13	Anagennisi	795
14	Onisilos	748

== See also ==
- Cypriot First Division
- 2003–04 Cypriot Cup
- List of top goalscorers in Cypriot First Division by season
- Cypriot football clubs in European competitions

== Sources ==
- "2003/04 Cypriot First Division". Rec.Sport.Soccer Statistics Foundation. 2016-01-14.
- "1. DIVISION 2003/2004". Soccerway.
