= Fangio Buyse =

Belgian football manager and former player

Personal information
- Full name: Fangio Buyse
- Date of birth: 27 September 1974 (age 52)
- Place of birth: Deinze, Belgium
- Position: Midfielder

Youth career
- KMSK Deinze
- KSV Waregem
- Belgium U17

Senior career*
Years	Team	Apps	(Gls)
1993–1998	KSV Waregem	108	(9)
1998–1999	Niki Volos	25	(7)
1999–2002	Athinaikos	61	(16)
2002–2003	Kerkyra	24	(3)
2003–2004	Agios Dimitrios	42	(9)
2005–2006	Acharnaikos	38	(2)
2006–2008	Doxa Katokopia	52	(13)
2008–2010	APOP Kinyras Peyias	31	(9)
2010–2011	AEP Paphos	16	(1)
2011–2012	Akritas Chlorakas	25	(2)
2012–2013	AEK Kouklia	1	(0)

Managerial career
- 2012–2013: AEK Kouklia
- 2014–2017: Omonia (Assistant Manager)
- 2017–2018: Niki Volos
- 2018–2019: Olympiakos Nicosia
- 2019–2020: Blue Boys Muhlenbach
- 2020–2021: Kmsk Deinze U21
- 2021–2025: Abha Club
- 2025-Oct. 2026: Karmiotissa FC
- Dec. 2025-2026: Omonia 29M
- * Club domestic league appearances and goals

Fangio Buyse (born 27 September 1974) is a Belgian football midfielder and manager. Married with Nikolina Stevic and father of Lara Buyse

== Career ==
=== Player ===
He played with Australian Aurelio Vidmar in K.S.V. Waregem and subsequently moved to Greece to play for Niki Volos, Athinaikos, Kerkyra, Agios Dimitrios and Acharnaikos. In 2006 he went to Cyprus to play for Doxa Katokopias for two seasons, and then from summer 2008 he played for APOP Kinyras Peyias. At APOP Kinyras Peyias he helped them win their first Cypriot Cup title in 2009 and scored in the final against AEL Limassol.

=== Manager ===
In his first year as a player/manager in 2012–13 he managed to get AEK Kouklia F.C. promoted for the first time in the team's history to the Cypriot First Division. In July 2013 he moved to AC Omonia Nicosia, first as coach of the U-21 team and later in a double role also as Assistant-coach after the team sacked Toni Savevski. In a 21-month period he worked together with 3 headcoaches; Nenad Starovlah, Miguel Angel Lotina and Costas Kaiafas. He also was care-taker for Omonia's win over EN Paralimni on 5 January 2014. After 3.5 years in Omonia Nicosia AC he moved back to Niki Volos (his first team as a player in Greece), and started first as technical director of the academy, as he was also in his last year in Omonia. Then in 2017-18 as the first team manager he won the local Thessaly Cup, and also took the team to the Football League II Cup final. In 2018-19 he became manager of Olympiakos Nicosia. When he started they were in last position with 0 points, but he managed to get them promoted to the first division. After this successful season he decided to leave Cyprus. He was close to signing for FC Lugano but at the last moment the deal fell through, so he then joined newly promoted Blue Boys Muhlenbach and he managed to keep them in the BGL League. Due to Corona and the stop of the Championship in Luxembourg he moved to his home country to join KMSK Deinze in the B-team as head coach.

After the period in Saudi Arabia he returned in the position of head coach with success. In the season 2025-26 he started the season as the manager of Karmiotissa FC, where he left alone, because of disagreement with the board, after 4 games (3 wins - 1 loss). The team at the end of the season was promoted to the Cypriot First Division. He didn't stay without job for a long time as he joined Omonoia 29M in the beginning of December as head coach. He took over the team in the 5th position but 5 months later he managed to promote the team back to the Cypriot First Division.

=== Technical Director ===
After a 1-year stay in Deinze he received an offer from Saudi Professional League Abha Club to become technical director. At his arrival on 15 October the team was in the last place with only 4 points in 7 games. Abha Club after all they remained in the highest league. Also for the season 2022-23 an easy stay in the league was secured fast. After 3,5 years staying in the position of technical director he left the club by mutual consent.

== Honours ==
=== Player ===
KSV Waregem

- Belgian second division: 1994–95

Athinaikos

- Beta Ethniki: 2000–01

APOP Kinyras

- Cypriot Cup: 2008–09

=== Coach ===
AEK Kouklia

- Promotion to Cypriot First Division: 2013

Olympiakos Nicosia

- Promotion to Cypriot First Division: 2019

Omonia 29M

- Promotion to Cypriot First Division: 2026

Niki Volos

- Thessaly Cup 2017

== Managerial statistics ==
Team	From	To	Competition	Record				
Team	From	To	Competition	G	W	D	L	Win %
AEK Kouklia FC	1 July 2012	30 June 2013	League	32	21	2	9	65.63
AC Omonia Nicosia	1 July 2013	30 June 2014	League	26	17	4	5	65.38
AC Omonia Nicosia	1 July 2014	30 June 2015	League	26	18	3	5	69.23
Niki Volos	1 July 2017	30 June 2018	League	24	13	7	4	54.17
Olympiakos Nicosia	27 September 2018	30 May 2019	League	28	22	3	3	78.57
Karmiotissa FC	1 July 2025	15 October 2025	League	4	3	0	1	75.00
Omonia 29M	10 December 2025	31 May 2026	League	18	9	7	2	50.00
TOTAL			League	158	104	26	28	65.82
