= 2004–05 Cypriot First Division =

Cypriot First Division
- Season: 2004–05
- Champions: Anorthosis (12th title)
- Relegated: AEP; Alki; Aris
- Champions League: Anorthosis (1st qualifying round)
- UEFA Cup: APOEL (1st qualifying round); AC Omonia (1st qualifying round; via Cypriot Cup)
- Intertoto Cup: Olympiakos (1st round)
- Matches: 181
- Goals: 548 (3.03 per match)
- Top goalscorer: Łukasz Sosin (21 goals)

The 2004–05 Cypriot First Division was the 66th season of the Cypriot top-level football league. Anorthosis won their 12th title.

== Format ==
Fourteen teams participated in the 2004–05 Cypriot First Division. All teams played against each other twice, once at their home and once away. The team with the most points at the end of the season crowned champions. The last three teams were relegated to the 2005–06 Cypriot Second Division.

The champions ensured their participation in the 2005–06 UEFA Champions League and the runners-up in the 2005–06 UEFA Cup.

The teams had to declare their interest to participate in the 2005 UEFA Intertoto Cup before the end of the championship. At the end of the championship, the higher placed team among the interested ones participated in the Intertoto Cup (if they had not secured their participation in any other UEFA competition).

=== Point system ===
Teams received three points for a win, one point for a draw and zero points for a loss.

== Changes from previous season ==
Anagennisi Deryneia, Onisilos Sotira and Doxa Katokopias were relegated from previous season and played in the 2004–05 Cypriot Second Division. They were replaced by the first three teams of the 2003–04 Cypriot Second Division, Nea Salamina, Aris Limassol and Alki Larnaca.

== Stadia and locations ==
2004–05 Cypriot First Division

| Team | Stadium |
|---|---|
| AEK | GSZ Stadium |
| AEL | Tsirion Stadium |
| AEP | Pafiako Stadium |
| Alki | GSZ Stadium |
| Anorthosis | Antonis Papadopoulos Stadium |
| APOEL | GSP Stadium |
| Apollon | Tsirion Stadium |
| Aris | Tsirion Stadium |
| Digenis | Makario Stadium |
| Ethnikos | Dasaki Stadium |
| ENP | Paralimni Stadium |
| Nea Salamina | Antonis Papadopoulos Stadium |
| Olympiakos | GSP Stadium |
| Omonia | GSP Stadium |

== League standings ==
| Pos | Team | Pld | W | D | L | GF | GA | GD | Pts | Qualification or relegation |
|---|---|---|---|---|---|---|---|---|---|---|
| 1 | Anorthosis Famagusta (C) | 25 | 19 | 5 | 1 | 64 | 23 | +41 | 62 (Note: The round 22 match between Anorthosis and Apollon was declared void, as both teams were deemed guilty of the abandonment of the game; it was not rescheduled, and neither team got any points or goals attributed; it was counted in the matches played column but not in the matches lost column.) | Qualification for Champions League first qualifying round |
| 2 | APOEL | 26 | 17 | 7 | 2 | 56 | 21 | +35 | 58 | Qualification for UEFA Cup first qualifying round (Note: Omonia qualified for the UEFA Cup first qualifying round by winning the 2004–05 Cypriot Cup.) |
| 3 | Omonia | 26 | 13 | 8 | 5 | 47 | 29 | +18 | 47 | Qualification for UEFA Cup first qualifying round |
| 4 | Olympiakos Nicosia | 26 | 11 | 6 | 9 | 36 | 38 | −2 | 39 | Qualification for Intertoto Cup first round |
| 5 | Digenis Morphou | 26 | 10 | 6 | 10 | 36 | 31 | +5 | 36 | |
| 6 | Nea Salamina | 26 | 11 | 3 | 12 | 36 | 40 | −4 | 36 | |
| 7 | Apollon Limassol | 25 | 10 | 5 | 10 | 43 | 35 | +8 | 35 | |
| 8 | Enosis Neon Paralimni | 26 | 7 | 11 | 8 | 38 | 39 | −1 | 32 | |
| 9 | AEK Larnaca | 26 | 7 | 11 | 8 | 26 | 34 | −8 | 32 | |
| 10 | AEL Limassol | 26 | 8 | 7 | 11 | 36 | 38 | −2 | 31 | |
| 11 | Ethnikos Achna | 26 | 8 | 6 | 12 | 31 | 40 | −9 | 30 | |
| 12 | AEP Paphos (R) | 26 | 8 | 5 | 13 | 38 | 52 | −14 | 29 | Relegation to Cypriot Second Division |
| 13 | Alki Larnaca (R) | 26 | 8 | 5 | 13 | 39 | 55 | −16 | 29 | Relegation to Cypriot Second Division |
| 14 | Aris Limassol (R) | 26 | 1 | 1 | 24 | 22 | 73 | −51 | 4 | Relegation to Cypriot Second Division |

Rules for classification: 1) Points, 2) Goal differences, 3) Goal for
(C) Champions; (R) Relegated

== Results ==
| Home \ Away | AEK | AEL | AEP | ALK | ANR | APN | APL | ARS | DGN | ETH | ENP | NSL | OLM | OMN |
|---|---|---|---|---|---|---|---|---|---|---|---|---|---|---|
| AEK | | 0–5 | 2–1 | 0–2 | 0–0 | 2–1 | 0–0 | 2–0 | 1–1 | 2–0 | 1–1 | 1–0 | 0–0 | 1–1 |
| AEL | 1–1 | | 0–0 | 2–2 | 3–1 | 1–1 | 1–4 | 2–1 | 0–1 | 0–2 | 2–2 | 2–1 | 2–3 | 2–2 |
| AEP | 1–1 | 3–2 | | 3–2 | 2–3 | 0–3 | 1–3 | 2–1 | 3–1 | 1–0 | 2–2 | 0–2 | 1–2 | 3–4 |
| Alki | 3–1 | 0–0 | 3–1 | | 0–4 | 0–1 | 6–1 | 3–2 | 1–2 | 0–1 | 2–0 | 3–0 | 2–3 | 3–3 |
| Anorthosis | 3–1 | 2–0 | 2–1 | 7–2 | | 1–1 | – (Note: The round 22 match between Anorthosis and Apollon was declared void, as both teams were deemed guilty of the abandonment of the game; it was not rescheduled and neither team got any points or goals attributed; it was counted in the matches played column but not in the matches lost column.) | 2–0 | 0–0 | 3–0 | 3–2 | 4–2 | 5–0 | 2–0 |
| APOEL | 2–0 | 5–0 | 3–0 | 5–1 | 2–3 | | 4–2 | 1–0 | 2–1 | 1–1 | 2–1 | 2–0 | 4–0 | 3–1 |
| Apollon | 1–2 | 0–3 | 0–2 | 5–0 | 0–1 | 0–0 | | 4–1 | 1–2 | 6–0 | 4–1 | 2–3 | 1–0 | 1–1 |
| Aris | 0–1 | 0–3 | 0–3 | 2–0 | 1–4 | 0–3 | 1–2 | | 1–4 | 2–3 | 1–1 | 2–3 | 1–5 | 1–6 |
| Digenis | 3–3 | 0–2 | 2–1 | 6–2 | 1–3 | 1–1 | 0–1 | 2–0 | | 1–1 | 1–0 | 1–1 | 0–1 | 0–1 |
| Ethnikos | 3–2 | 0–1 | 1–2 | 2–0 | 1–3 | 0–1 | 0–0 | 5–2 | 1–2 | | 0–1 | 3–0 | 1–0 | 0–0 |
| ENP | 1–1 | 2–0 | 2–2 | 1–1 | 1–1 | 3–3 | 2–3 | 2–1 | 1–0 | 3–2 | | 2–1 | 2–2 | 3–0 |
| Nea Salamina | 2–0 | 1–0 | 2–1 | 0–0 | 0–2 | 1–2 | 1–1 | 4–1 | 0–4 | 4–1 | 3–2 | | 2–1 | 0–1 |
| Olympiakos | 2–1 | 2–1 | 2–2 | 0–1 | 1–1 | 1–2 | 2–1 | 2–0 | 2–0 | 2–2 | 0–0 | 1–3 | | 2–0 |
| Omonia | 0–0 | 2–1 | 7–0 | 3–0 | 2–4 | 1–1 | 1–0 | 4–1 | 1–0 | 1–1 | 1–0 | 1–0 | 3–0 | |

Legend: Blue = home team win; Yellow = draw; Red = away team win.

== Attendances ==
| # | Club | Average |
|---|---|---|
| 1 | APOEL | 7,714 |
| 2 | Omonoia | 6,535 |
| 3 | Anorthosis | 5,646 |
| 4 | AEL | 3,516 |
| 5 | Apollon Limassol | 3,100 |
| 6 | Nea Salamina | 2,453 |
| 7 | AEK Larnaca | 2,010 |
| 8 | Olympiakos Nicosia | 1,981 |
| 9 | AEP | 1,774 |
| 10 | Alki | 1,232 |
| 11 | Aris Limassol | 1,148 |
| 12 | Digenis | 1,084 |
| 13 | ENP | 1,001 |
| 14 | Ethnikos Achnas | 896 |

== See also ==
- Cypriot First Division
- 2004–05 Cypriot Cup
- List of top goalscorers in Cypriot First Division by season
- Cypriot football clubs in European competitions

== Sources ==
- "2004/05 Cypriot First Division". Rec.Sport.Soccer Statistics Foundation. 2016-01-14.
- "1. DIVISION 2004/2005". Soccerway. Archived from the original on August 11, 2016.
