= Makis Papaioannou =

Cypriot footballer (born 1977)

Personal information
- Full name: Makis Papaioannou
- Date of birth: May 8, 1977 (age 49)
- Place of birth: Larnaca, Cyprus
- Height: 1.84 m (6 ft 0 in)
- Position: Centre back

Team information
- Current team: Apollon Limasol (technical director)

Youth career
- 1993–1995: Othellos Athienou
- 1995–1998: AEK Larnaca

Senior career*
Years	Team	Apps	(Gls)
1998–2004	AEK Larnaca	97	(7)
2004–2006	Omonia	27	(0)
2006–2008	Olympiakos Nicosia	46	(0)
2009	Ermis Aradippou	1	(0)

Managerial career
- 2009–2010: Ermis Aradippou (technical director)
- 2011–2013: Ethnikos Achna (technical director)
- 2013–2014: Ermis Aradippou (technical director)
- 2014–2017: Nea Salamina (technical director)
- 2017–2018: Omonia (technical director)
- 2018–: Nea Salamina (technical director)
- * Club domestic league appearances and goals

Makis Papaioannou (Greek: Μάκης Παπαιωάννου; born May 8, 1977) is a Cypriot former professional footballer who played as a centre back. He is the current professional technical director for Cypriot First Division club Nea Salamina.

== Career ==
Papaioannou played for AEK Larnaca F.C. during the 2003–04 Cypriot First Division season. That season he also helped them win the Cypriot Cup and Papaioannou scored both goals in the final as they defeated AEL Limassol 2–1.

== Honours ==
AEK Larnaca

- Cypriot Cup: 2003–04
