= 2008–09 Cypriot Cup =

Tournament details
- Country: Cyprus
- Dates: 23 September 2008 – 16 May 2009
- Teams: 28

Final positions
- Champions: APOP Kinyras (1st title)
- Runners-up: AEL Limassol

The 2008–09 Cypriot Cup was the 67th edition of the Cypriot Cup. A total of 28 clubs entered the competition. The tournament involved teams from the Cypriot First Division and lower divisions, with matches played over two legs in the early rounds. It began on 23 September 2008 with the first round and concluded on 16 May 2009 with the final which was held at GSP Stadium. APOP Kinyras won their 1st Cypriot Cup trophy after beating AEL 2–0 in the final.

== Format ==
In the 2008–09 Cypriot Cup, participated all the teams of the Cypriot First Division and the Cypriot Second Division. Teams from the two lower divisions (Third and Fourth) competed in a separate cup competition.

The competition consisted of five rounds. All rounds, except the final, were played in a two-legged format, each team playing a home and an away match against their opponent. The team which scored more goals on aggregate, was qualifying to the next round. If the two teams scored the same number of goals on aggregate, then the team which scored more goals away from home was advancing to the next round.

If both teams had scored the same number of home and away goals, then extra time was following after the end of the second leg match. If during the extra thirty minutes both teams had managed to score, but they had scored the same number of goals, then the team who scored the away goals was advancing to the next round (i.e. the team which was playing away). If there weren't scored any goals during extra time, the qualifying team was determined by penalty shoot-out.

The final was a single match.

The cup winner secured a place in the 2009–10 UEFA Europa League.

== Bracket ==
Second Round
1	Omonia	3	2	5
16	Digenis Morphou	1	1	2
8	AEK Larnaca	0	1	1
9	APOP Kinyras	2	1	3
5	Ermis Aradippou	3	4	7
12	THOI Lakatamia	1	1	2
4	APOEL	2	3	5
13	Doxa Katokopias	2	2	4
6	Anorthosis	2	1	3
11	Apollon (a.e.t.)	1	3	4
3	Atromitos Yeroskipou	0	0	0
14	Enosis Neon Paralimni	0	3	3
7	Ethnikos Assia	1	1	2
10	Ethnikos Achna	5	3	8
2	AE Paphos	0	1	1
15	AEL Limassol	1	2	3

Quarter-finals
Omonia	0	0	0
APOP Kinyras	0	3	3
Ermis Aradippou	1	0	1
APOEL	1	3	4
Apollon (a)	2	2	4
Enosis Neon Paralimni	1	3	4
Ethnikos Achna	1	0	2
AEL Limassol	1	2	3

Semi-finals
APOP Kinyras	2	0	2
APOEL	0	1	1
Apollon	1	1	2
AEL Limassol (a.e.t.)	1	2	3

Final
APOP Kinyras	2
AEL Limassol	0

== First round ==
In the first round participated all the teams of the Cypriot Second Division and 10 of 14 teams of the Cypriot First Division. The four first division teams which were qualified for 2007–08 Cypriot Cup's semifinals (APOEL, Anorthosis, Apollon, Omonia) did not participated in this round. The Cypriot First Division teams were not drawn together and played the second leg at home.

The draw for the First Round took place on September 10, 2008. The first legs were played on September 23, 24 and October 1, 2008. The second legs were played on October 4 and 5, 2008.

Team 1	Agg.	Team 2	1st leg	2nd leg
Olympiakos Nicosia	2–6	AEL Limassol	0–3	2–3
Nea Salamis	2–4	Doxa Katokopias	1–3	1–1
Aris Limassol	1–2	AE Paphos	1–1	0–1
Omonia Aradippou	2–3	APOP Kinyras	0–2	2–1
AO Ayia Napa	2–5	Ethnikos Achna	2–2	0–3
PAEEK	1–5	Atromitos Yeroskipou	0–2	1–3
Ethnikos Assia	2–0	ASIL Lysi	0–0	2–0
Onisilos Sotira	1–2	THOI Lakatamia	0–1	1–1
MEAP Nisou	0–4	AEK Larnaca	0–1	0–3
Digenis Morphou	6–4	Alki Larnaca	4–3	2–1
Chalkanoras Idaliou	2–3	Enosis Neon Paralimni	2–3	0–0
Ermis Aradippou	3–3 (a)	APEP	1–1	2–2 (a.e.t.)

== Second round ==
Teams that qualified for last year's semifinals entered in this round, along with the 12 winners of the previous round. The draw for the second round took place on December 29, 2008. The first legs were played on January 14 and 21, 2009. The second legs were played on January 28 and February 4, 2009.

Team 1	Agg.	Team 2	1st leg	2nd leg
AEK Larnaca	1–3	APOP Kinyras	0–2	1–1
Omonia	5–2	Digenis Morphou	3–1	2–1
AE Paphos	1–3	AEL Limassol	0–1	1–2
Ermis Aradippou	7–2	THOI Lakatamia	3–1	4–1
APOEL	5–4	Doxa Katokopias	2–2	3–2
Ethnikos Assia	2–8	Ethnikos Achna	1–5	1–3
Atromitos Yeroskipou	0–3	Enosis Neon Paralimni	0–0	0–3
Anorthosis	3–4	Apollon	2–1	1–3 (a.e.t.)

== Quarter-finals ==
The draw for the quarterfinals took place on February 5, 2009 at the Hilton Park hotel in Nicosia. The first legs were played on February 25 and March 4, 2009. The second legs were played on March 11 and 18, 2009.

Team 1	Agg.	Team 2	1st leg	2nd leg
Omonia	0–3	APOP Kinyras	0–0	0–3
Ethnikos Achna	1–3	AEL Limassol	1–1	0–2
Ermis Aradippou	1–4	APOEL	1–1	0–3
Apollon	4–4 (a)	Enosis Neon Paralimni	2–1	2–3

== Semi-finals ==
The draw for the semifinals took place at the Hilton Park hotel in Nicosia on March 20, 2009. The first legs were played on April 15, 2009. The second legs were played on May 6, 2009.

=== First legs ===
15 April 2009
17:00 EEST

Apollon	1–1	AEL Limassol
Avraam 88'		Pulpo 33'

Tsirion Stadium, Limassol
Referee: Marios Tsangaris

15 April 2009
19:00 EEST

APOP Kinyras	2–0	APOEL
Buyse 30'; Vasconcelos 58'		Pinto (red card) 80'

Peyia Municipal Stadium, Pegeia
Attendance: 3,100
Referee: Leontios Trattos

=== Second legs ===
6 May 2009
18:00 EEST

AEL Limassol	2–1 (a.e.t.)	Apollon
Freddy 17'; Roque 101'		Risso 84'

Tsirion Stadium, Limassol
Referee: Costas Kapitanis

AEL won 3–2 on aggregate

6 May 2009
19:30 EEST

APOEL	1–0	APOP Kinyras
Alexandrou 16' (pen.)

GSP Stadium, Nicosia
Attendance: 9,848
Referee: Stelios Tryfonos

APOP Kinyras Peyias won 2–1 on aggregate

== Final ==
16 May 2009
19:00 EEST

APOP Kinyras	2–0	AEL Limassol
Efthymiou 84'; Buyse 88'; Liri (red card) 89'	Report

GSP Stadium, Nicosia
Attendance: 15,000
Referee: (Cyprus) Leontios Trattou

Cypriot Cup 2008-09 Winners
APOP Kinyras
1st Title

== Sources ==
- Official website
- "2008/09 Cyprus Cup". Rec.Sport.Soccer Statistics Foundation. 2016-01-14.
- Papamoiseos, Stelios (2013). Από την ενοποίηση... στα αστέρια [From unification... to the stars] (in Greek). Nicosia: The writer. pp. 150–151.

== See also ==
- Cypriot Cup
- 2008–09 Cypriot First Division
- 2008–09 Cypriot Second Division
