= Onisilos Sotira =

Onisillos Sotiras
- Full name: Kentro Neon Onisillos Sotiras
- Founded: 1978
- Dissolved: 16 July 2014
- Ground: Koinotiko Sotiras; Sotira, Cyprus
- Capacity: 2,000
- Chairman: Vacant
- Manager: Vacant
- League: Cypriot Second Division
- 2019–20: 5th
- Website: http://www.onisillos.com/
Home colours	Away colours

Kentro Neon Onisillos Sotiras was a Cypriot football club based in the village of Sotira. The club was founded in 1978 and was named after the ancient Cypriot revolutionary Onesilus.

== Overview ==
The club has played in the Cypriot First Division once during the 2003–04 season. The club was dissolved on 16 July 2014 due to financial problems.

== Notable players ==
- (Cyprus) Panayiotis Kosma
- (Netherlands) Robin Muller van Moppes
- (Netherlands) Tom Kalkhuis
- (Netherlands) Martijn Roosenburg
- (Portugal) Paulinho
- (Portugal) Sebastião Nogueira
- (Slovakia) Peter Kostolani
- (Cyprus) Demetris Christofi
- (Cyprus) Takis Pattadorou
- (Cyprus) Leuteris Eleutheriou
