= APOP Kinyras FC =

Cypriot football club

APOP Kinyras
- Full name: APOP Kinyras FC; Αθλητικός Ποδοσφαιρικός Ομιλος Πέγειας Κινύρας
- Founded: 2003; 23 years ago
- Dissolved: 2012; 14 years ago
- Ground: Peyia Municipal Stadium, Peyia, Cyprus
- Capacity: 3,828
- Chairman: (Cyprus) Michalis Mitas
- Manager: (Cyprus) Andros Polydorou
- League: Cypriot Fourth Division
- 2011–12: 12th (relegated)
Home colours	Away colours

APOP Kinyras FC (Greek: ΑΠΟΠ, Αθλητικός Ποδοσφαιρικός Ομιλος Πέγειας Κινύρας, Athlitikos Podosfairikos Omilos Pegeias Kinyras, "Athletic Football Club Peyia Kinyras") was a Cypriot football club from the village of Peyia of Paphos District. The club formed in 2003 following the merger of lower division outfits APOP Peyias FC and Kinyras Empas FC. The club's name APOP means Athlitikos Podosferikos Omilos Pegeias (Athletic Football Club Peyia) and Kinyras' name coming from the mythical king Kinyras who was the founder of Paphos. In the summer of 2012, after a large bankruptcy the club was dissolved.

In May 2009, APOP Kinyras caused a major stir by winning the Cypriot Cup final, upsetting overwhelming favourites AC Omonia, APOEL FC and AEL Limassol, becoming the first club from Paphos to win a major trophy. In July 2009, APOP Kinyras become the first team from the Paphos region to play in a UEFA competition, visiting Rapid Wien in the first leg of the UEFA Europa League third qualifying round.

== History ==
The club's started their history in the 3rd division on the 2003/04 season where they promoted to Second Division as Champions. The following season they won the second division championship and they were promoted as Second Division Champions to the Cypriot First Division for the first time in their history. However, the team finished 12th in the 2005–06 season and they were relegated back to the second division . In 2007 the team won the Second Division championship and they were promoted to First Division for the second time. They finished 8th in the 2007–08 first division championship and in the 2008–09 season finished seventh.

Few gave APOP Kinyras any chance of clinching silverware that season, although under coach Giorgos Polyviou, manage to create quite a stir when they upset overwhelming favourites and win the Cypriot Cup final against AEL Limassol. After the success, the team became the first club from Paphos to win a major trophy since the foundation of the Cyprus Football Association in 1934. After overcoming AC Omonia in quarterfinals and APOEL FC in semifinals, the Paphos side withstood some intense AEL pressure before scoring two late goals through Angelos Efthymiou and Fangio Buyse to seal a remarkable triumph in Nicosia's GSP Stadium.

In their first European game APOP Kinyras played in Vienna on July 30, 2009; losing against Rapid Wien 2–1 in the first leg of the third qualifying round of the UEFA Europa League. In the second leg, Rapid needed Trimmel's extra-time goal (2–2) to eliminate the Paphos side, which impressed at the match sending it to overtime, coming from 0–1 down to 2–1 lead with two goals from Edgar Marcelino and Sebastián González.

In 2011, after 4 consecutive seasons in the first division, a record for the club, they were relegated back to the Cypriot Second Division.

In 2012, in after a lot of scandals the club was relegated by CFA and UEFA from the Second to Fourth Division. The same year, after a large bankruptcy the club was dissolved.

== Colours and badge ==
The club's colours were yellow and blue.

== Stadium ==
The club's home was Peyia Municipal Stadium which has capacity of 3,828 spectators. In 2005/06, when the team participated in the First Division, they were not allowed to use Pegeia Stadium, for the reason that the stadium does not satisfy the criteria of First Division and the team used for home the Pafiako Stadium. In 2007 expansions have been made in Pegeia stadium and APOP/Kinyras was allowed to use the Peyia Municipal Stadium.

== Notable former players ==
For a complete list of APOP Kinyras Peyias players, see APOP Kinyras FC players

== Honours ==
- Cypriot Cup
  - Winner (1): 2008–09
- Cypriot Second Division
  - Champions (2): 2004–05, 2006–07
- Cypriot Third Division:
  - Champions (1): 2003–04

== APOP Kinyras in European competitions ==
Season	Competition	Round		Club	Home	Away	Agg.
2009–10	UEFA Europa League	3rd Qualifying	(Austria)	Rapid Wien	2–2 (aet)	1–2	3–4
