= 2010–11 Cypriot First Division =

Marfin Laiki League
- Season: 2010–11
- Champions: APOEL; 21st title
- Relegated: AEP; Doxa; APOP Kinyras
- Champions League: APOEL
- Europa League: Omonoia; Anorthosis; AEK
- Matches: 218
- Goals: 569 (2.61 per match)
- Top goalscorer: Miljan Mrdaković (21 goals)
- Biggest home win: Omonia 6–0 Doxa
- Biggest away win: Apollon 0–5 APOEL; APOP Kinyras 0–5 APOEL
- Highest scoring: APOEL 6–2 APOP Kinyras

The 2010–11 Cypriot First Division was the 72nd season of the Cypriot top-level football league. It began on 27 August 2010 with the first matches of the first round and will end on 11 May 2011 with the last matches of the second round. The defending champions were Omonia. APOEL won the championship four matchweeks before the end of the season.

== Competition modus ==
Fourteen teams participate in the competition. Eleven of them have also competed in the 2009–10 season while the remaining three teams were promoted from the Second Division.

Each team plays against every other team twice, once at home and once away, for a total of 26 matches. After these matches, the two teams with the worst records will be relegated to the Second Division. The remaining twelve teams will be divided into three groups of four teams each.

The teams ranked first through fourth will play for the championship and to participate in the European competitions. Teams ranked ninth through 12th will determine the third relegated club, while the remaining four teams will play a placement round. Every team plays twice against its group opponents. Regular season records are carried over without any modifications.

== Teams ==
Nea Salamis Famagusta and APEP Pitsilia were relegated at the end of the first stage of the 2009–10 season after finishing in the bottom two places of the table. They were joined by Aris Limassol, who finished at the bottom of the second-phase Group C.

The relegated teams were replaced by 2009–10 Second Division champions Alki Larnaca, runners-up AEK Larnaca and third-placed team Olympiakos Nicosia.

Location of clubs in 2010–11 Cypriot First Division

Club	Location	Venue	Capacity
AEK	Larnaca	Neo GSZ Stadium	13,032
AEL	Limassol	Tsirion Stadium	13,331
AEP	Paphos	Pafiako Stadium	10,000
Alki	Larnaca	Antonis Papadopoulos Stadium	10,230
Anorthosis	Larnaca	Antonis Papadopoulos Stadium	10,230
APOEL	Nicosia	GSP Stadium	22,859
Apollon	Limassol	Tsirion Stadium	13,331
APOP Kinyras	Peyia, Paphos	Peyia Municipal Stadium	3,828
Doxa	Nicosia	Makario Stadium	16,000
Enosis	Paralimni	Tasos Marcou Stadium	5,800
Ermis	Aradippou, Larnaca	Ammochostos Stadium	5,500
Ethnikos Achna	Achna, Famagusta	Dasaki Stadium	7,000
Olympiakos	Nicosia	GSP Stadium	22,859
Omonia	Nicosia	GSP Stadium	22,859

=== Personnel and kits ===
Note: Flags indicate national team as has been defined under FIFA eligibility rules. Players and Managers may hold more than one non-FIFA nationality.

Team	Manager^{1}	Captain	Kit manufacturer	Shirt sponsor
AEK	(Netherlands) Ton Caanen	(Netherlands) Kevin Hofland	Puma	Cytavision
AEL	(Cyprus) Pambos Christodoulou	(Bosnia and Herzegovina) Dušan Kerkez	Mass	Cytavision
AEP	(Cyprus) Giorgos Polyviou	(Cyprus) Angelos Efthymiou	Legea	Ocean Basket
Alki	(Israel) Itzhak Shum	(Cyprus) Siniša Dobrasinović	Legea	Touch Blue Development
Anorthosis	(Bulgaria) Stanimir Stoilov	(Cyprus) Ioannis Okkas	Puma	Cytamobile-Vodafone
APOEL	(Serbia) Ivan Jovanović	(Cyprus) Marinos Satsias	Puma	MTN
Apollon	(Cyprus) Andreas Michaelides	(Argentina) Daniel Quinteros	Lotto	Columbia
APOP Kinyras	(Cyprus) Sofoklis Sofokleous	(Ivory Coast) Alain Liri	Puma	PrimeTel
Doxa	(Cyprus) Nikos Andronikou	(Cyprus) Stelios Okkarides	Puma	Cytanet
Enosis	(Cyprus) Nikodimos Papavasiliou	(Cyprus) Demos Goumenos	Lotto	Cyta
Ermis	(Portugal) João Carlos Pereira	(Brazil) Wender	Legea	Cyta
Ethnikos Achna	(Serbia) Svetozar Šapurić	(Cyprus) Christos Poyiatzis	Legea	Cyta
Olympiakos	(Cyprus) Pambos Christodoulou	(Cyprus) Nikolas Nicolaou	Puma	Cyta
Omonia	(Cyprus) Neophytos Larkou	(Cyprus) Elias Charalambous	Adidas	Cytamobile-Vodafone

=== Managerial changes ===
Team	Outgoing manager	Manner of departure	Date of vacancy	Table	Incoming manager	Date of appointment	Table
Ermis	(Serbia) Dusan Mitošević	Sacked	16 August 2010	Pre-season	(Cyprus) Christos Kassianos	17 August 2010	Pre-season
AEL	(Czech Republic) Dušan Uhrin, Jr.	Sacked	21 September 2010	9th	(Romania) Mihai Stoichiţă	22 September 2010	9th
Omonia	(Greece) Takis Lemonis	Resigned	4 October 2010	4th	(Serbia) Dušan Bajević	13 October 2010	4th
Alki	(Cyprus) Marios Constantinou	Resigned	19 October 2010	9th	(Israel) Itzhak Shum	21 October 2010	9th
Apollon	(Serbia) Slobodan Krčmarević	Sacked	21 October 2010	14th	(Cyprus) Andreas Michaelides	26 October 2010	14th
Ermis	(Cyprus) Christos Kassianos	Resigned	13 November 2010	11th	(Cyprus) Demetris Ioannou	15 November 2010	11th
Anorthosis	(Argentina) Guillermo Ángel Hoyos	Sacked	17 November 2010	4th	(Serbia) Slobodan Krčmarević	17 November 2010	4th
APOP Kinyras	(Cyprus) Giorgos Polyviou	Resigned	1 December 2010	14th	(Cyprus) Sofoklis Sofokleous	13 December 2010	13th
AEP	(Bulgaria) Angel Slavkov	Sacked	7 December 2010	14th	(Cyprus) Giorgos Polyviou	7 December 2010	14th
Ermis	(Cyprus) Demetris Ioannou	Resigned	7 December 2010	9th	(Portugal) João Carlos Pereira	9 December 2010	9th
Anorthosis	(Serbia) Slobodan Krčmarević	Resigned	18 December 2010	5th	(Bulgaria) Stanimir Stoilov	27 December 2010	6th
Enosis	(North Macedonia) Cedomir Janevski	Mutual consent	10 January 2011	10th	(Cyprus) Nikodimos Papavasiliou	18 January 2011	9th
Doxa	(Cyprus) Nikodimos Papavasiliou	Resigned	13 January 2011	14th	(Cyprus) Nikos Andronikou	21 January 2011	14th
AEL	(Romania) Mihai Stoichiţă	Mutual consent	27 January 2011	7th	(Netherlands) Raymond Atteveld	7 February 2011	7th

== First round ==
=== League table ===
Pos	Team	Pld	W	D	L	GF	GA	GD	Pts	Qualification or relegation
1	APOEL	26	20	2	4	55	19	+36	62	Qualification for second round, Group A
2	Omonia Nicosia	26	14	8	4	38	16	+22	50	Qualification for second round, Group A
3	Anorthosis Famagusta	26	13	6	7	46	31	+15	45	Qualification for second round, Group A
4	AEK Larnaca	26	12	6	8	36	30	+6	42	Qualification for second round, Group A
5	Apollon Limassol	26	11	5	10	40	37	+3	38	Qualification for second round, Group B
6	Olympiakos Nicosia	26	9	9	8	41	41	0	36 (Note: OLY 1-1 ENP; ENP 1-3 OLY)	Qualification for second round, Group B
7	Enosis Neon Paralimni	26	10	6	10	26	25	+1	36	Qualification for second round, Group B
8	AEL Limassol	26	8	9	9	28	35	−7	33 (Note: AEL 2-1 ETH; ETH 0-0 AEL)	Qualification for second round, Group B
9	Ethnikos Achna	26	8	9	9	25	27	−2	33	Qualification for second round, Group C
10	Ermis Aradippou	26	7	9	10	31	38	−7	30	Qualification for second round, Group C
11	Alki Larnaca	26	8	5	13	30	40	−10	29	Qualification for second round, Group C
12	AEP Paphos	26	6	8	12	33	37	−4	26	Qualification for second round, Group C
13	Doxa Katokopias (R)	26	5	5	16	25	55	−30	20	Relegation to Cypriot Second Division
14	APOP Kinyras (R)	26	4	7	15	24	47	−23	19	Relegation to Cypriot Second Division

Source: UEFA
Rules for classification: 1) points; 2) head-to-head points; 3) head-to-head goal difference; 4) head-to-head goals scored; 5) goal difference; 6) number of goals scored.
Qualified teams for Group A will play for one spot for the second qualifying round of the UEFA Champions League and two spots for the UEFA Europa League second qualifying round.
A spot in the third qualifying round of UEFA Europa League will be awarded to the winners of the 2010–11 Cypriot Cup.
Qualified teams for Group C will play for one additional relegation spot.
Points gained in the First Round will be taken over into the Second Round groups.
(R) Relegated

=== Results ===
Home \ Away	AEK	AEL	AEP	ALK	ANO	APOE	APOL	APOP	DOX	ENP	ERM	ETH	OLY	OMO
AEK Larnaca		0–0	2–1	0–2	3–0	1–2	2–2	3–2	2–0	0–2	2–1	1–1	1–1	1–2
AEL Limassol	1–2		1–0	1–0	1–3	2–2	2–3	2–0	3–0	0–0	1–2	2–1	3–2	0–0
AEP Paphos	2–0	2–2		1–2	1–2	1–1	1–0	0–0	5–0	0–1	3–1	0–1	1–3	1–1
Alki Larnaca	1–2	3–0	2–3		2–3	2–1	2–3	0–0	1–1	0–3	0–1	2–2	0–0	0–4
Anorthosis Famagusta	2–1	4–0	1–1	1–2		2–0	1–2	3–0	4–1	3–1	4–0	1–1	2–1	0–0
APOEL	1–0	2–0	5–1	1–0	2–1		2–1	6–2	3–1	2–1	1–0	0–1	4–1	3–0
Apollon Limassol	1–2	3–0	1–0	1–2	1–2	0–5		2–1	4–0	1–0	1–1	1–1	2–1	2–0
APOP Kinyras	0–0	3–4	0–1	1–2	3–1	0–5	2–1		1–1	0–2	1–3	1–0	1–3	0–1
Doxa Katokopias	1–4	0–0	2–1	3–0	2–2	0–1	1–1	4–3		1–0	1–0	0–2	1–2	2–3
Enosis Neon Paralimni	0–2	1–1	2–1	0–2	0–0	1–0	2–1	1–0	1–0		3–1	1–2	1–3	0–1
Ermis Aradippou	1–1	0–0	2–2	3–1	3–0 (Note: The match between Ermis and Anorthosis was awarded to Ermis with a score of 3–0 on 9 February 2011. The original encounter on 29 January 2011 had been suspended with Ermis leading 2–1 after repeated violent conduct of Anorthosis supporters.)	0–2	2–2	1–1	2–1	1–0		1–1	2–2	0–0
Ethnikos Achna	0–1	0–0	2–1	2–1	0–2	0–1	0–2	0–0	3–2	2–2	1–0		0–1	0–0
Olympiakos Nicosia	2–3	0–2	2–2	1–1	2–2	1–2	2–1	1–1	1–0	1–1	3–2	3–2		0–2
Omonia Nicosia	2–0	2–0	1–1	2–0	1–0	0–1	3–1	0–1	6–0	0–0	4–1	1–0	2–2	

Source: Soccerway
Legend: Blue = home team win; Yellow = draw; Red = away team win.

== Second round ==
=== Group A ===
==== Table ====
Pos	Team	Pld	W	D	L	GF	GA	GD	Pts	Qualification
1	APOEL (C)	32	24	2	6	63	22	+41	74	Qualification for Champions League second qualifying round
2	Omonia Nicosia	32	18	9	5	45	19	+26	63	Qualification for Europa League third qualifying round (Note: Omonia qualified for the third qualifying round of the 2011–12 UEFA Europa League after winning the 2010–11 Cypriot Cup.)
3	Anorthosis Famagusta	32	16	7	9	51	34	+17	55	Qualification for Europa League second qualifying round
4	AEK Larnaca	32	12	6	14	37	42	−5	42	Qualification for Europa League second qualifying round

Rules for classification: 1) points; 2) head-to-head points; 3) head-to-head goal difference; 4) head-to-head goals scored; 5) goal difference; 6) number of goals scored.
(C) Champions

==== Results ====
Home \ Away	AEK	ANO	APOE	OMO
AEK Larnaca		0–1	0–1	1–2
Anorthosis Famagusta	2–0		1–2	0–0
APOEL	3–0	0–1		2–0
Omonia Nicosia	3–0	1–0	1–0	

Legend: Blue = home team win; Yellow = draw; Red = away team win.

=== Group B ===
==== Table ====
Pos	Team	Pld	W	D	L	GF	GA	GD	Pts
5	Apollon Limassol	32	14	7	11	55	44	+11	49
6	Enosis Neon Paralimni	32	12	8	12	33	34	−1	44
7	AEL Limassol	32	10	11	11	37	45	−8	41 (Note: AEL: 9 pts; OLY: 3 pts)
8	Olympiakos Nicosia	32	10	11	11	48	53	−5	41

Source: Soccerway
Rules for classification: 1) points; 2) head-to-head points; 3) head-to-head goal difference; 4) head-to-head goals scored; 5) goal difference; 6) number of goals scored.

==== Results ====
Home \ Away	AEL	APOL	ENP	OLY
AEL Limassol		1–1	1–1	2–1
Apollon Limassol	3–1		3–0	5–1
Enosis Neon Paralimni	2–3	2–1		1–0
Olympiakos Nicosia	2–1	2–2	1–1	

Source: Soccerway
Legend: Blue = home team win; Yellow = draw; Red = away team win.

=== Group C ===
==== Table ====
Pos	Team	Pld	W	D	L	GF	GA	GD	Pts	Relegation
9	Ethnikos Achna	32	10	9	13	29	37	−8	39 (Note: ETH: 7 pts; ALK: 4 pts)	
10	Alki Larnaca	32	11	6	15	40	48	−8	39	
11	Ermis Aradippou	32	9	11	12	38	45	−7	38	
12	AEP Paphos (R)	32	8	11	13	44	44	0	35	Relegation to Cypriot Second Division

Rules for classification: 1) points; 2) head-to-head points; 3) head-to-head goal difference; 4) head-to-head goals scored; 5) goal difference; 6) number of goals scored.
(R) Relegated

==== Results ====
Home \ Away	AEP	ALK	ERM	ETH
AEP Paphos		1–1	1–1	0–1
Alki Larnaca	1–3		1–0	2–3
Ermis Aradippou	3–3	1–2		1–0
Ethnikos Achna	0–3	0–3	0–1	

Legend: Blue = home team win; Yellow = draw; Red = away team win.

== Season statistics ==
=== Top scorers ===
Including matches played on 14 May 2011; Source: Cyprus Football Association

Rank	Player	Club	Goals
1	(Serbia) Miljan Mrdaković	Apollon	21
2	(Cyprus) Michalis Konstantinou	Omonia	17
3	(Portugal) João Paulo	Olympiakos	16
4	(Cape Verde) Cafú	Anorthosis	13
4	(Brazil) Joeano	Ermis	13
6	(North Macedonia) Ivan Tričkovski	APOEL	11
6	(Argentina) Esteban Solari	APOEL	11
6	(Cameroon) Emmanuel Kenmogne	Olympiakos	11
9	(Brazil) Gustavo Manduca	APOEL	10
9	(Angola) Freddy	AEL	10
9	(Sierra Leone) Moustapha Bangura	Apollon	10

=== Hat-tricks ===
Player	For	Against	Result	Date	Ref
(Netherlands) Gregoor van Dijk	AEK	APOP Kinyras	3–2	16 October 2010	
(Sierra Leone) Mustapha Bangura	Apollon	AEL	3–0	30 October 2010	
(Argentina) Esteban Solari	APOEL	Olympiakos	4–1	27 November 2010	
(Portugal) Zé Vítor	AEL	APOP Kinyras	4–3	28 November 2010	
(Cyprus) Michalis Konstantinou	Omonia	Apollon	3–1	5 December 2010	
(Cameroon) Emmanuel Kenmogne	Olympiakos	Ermis	3–2	19 December 2010	
(Brazil) Gustavo Manduca	APOEL	APOP Kinyras	6–2	27 February 2011	
(Brazil) Joeano	Ermis	Alki	3–1	13 March 2011	

== Attendances ==
#	Club	Average
1	APOEL	10,109
2	Omonoia	7,470
3	Anorthosis	4,888
4	AEK Larnaca	3,847
5	AEL	3,113
6	Apollon Limassol	3,030
7	Olympiakos Nicosia	1,593
8	Paphos	1,513
9	Kinyras	1,458
10	Alki	1,444
11	Ermis	1,100
12	Doxa Katokopias	998
13	Ethnikos Achnas	879
14	ENP	806

== See also ==
- 2010–11 Cypriot Second Division
- 2010–11 Cypriot Cup

== Sources ==
- "2010/11 Cypriot First Division". Rec.Sport.Soccer Statistics Foundation. 14 January 2016.
