= 2009–10 Cypriot First Division =

Marfin Laiki League
- Season: 2009–10
- Champions: Omonia; 20th title
- Relegated: Aris; Nea Salamis; APEP
- Champions League: Omonia
- Europa League: APOEL; Anorthosis; Apollon
- Matches: 218
- Goals: 569 (2.61 per match)
- Top goalscorer: José Semedo (22 goals); Joeano (22 goals)
- Biggest home win: APOEL 5–0 Aris
- Biggest away win: Enosis 0-4 Omonia
- Highest scoring: Ermis 5-3 Aris

The 2009–10 Cypriot First Division was the 71st season of the Cypriot top-level football league. It started on 29 August 2009. APOEL were the defending champions.

== Competition modus ==
Fourteen teams will participate in the competition. Eleven of them have also competed in the 2008–09 season while the remaining three teams were promoted from the Second Division.

Each team will play against every other team twice, once at home and once away, for a total of 26 matches. After these matches, the two teams with the worst records will be relegated to the Second Division. The remaining twelve teams will be divided into three groups of four teams each.

The teams ranked first through fourth will play out the champion and the participants for the European competitions. Teams ranked ninth through 12th will determine the third relegated club, while the remaining four teams will play a placement round. Every team plays twice against its group opponents. Regular season records are carried over without any modifications.

== Team changes from 2009–10 ==
Relegated to Second Division 2009–10:

- 12th-placed team: APEP Pitsilia
- 13th-placed team: Nea Salamis
- 14th-placed team: Aris

Promoted from Second Division 2009–10:

- Champions: Alki Larnaca
- Runners-up: AEK Larnaca
- 3rd-placed team: Olympiakos Nicosia

== Overview ==
=== Stadiums and Locations ===
Due to the ongoing Cypriot separation, several clubs originally located in the Turkish occupied part of the island play in the unoccupied part. Further, not all home grounds fulfil the requirements for Cypriot top-level football. Thus, the map depicts the current home ground of each team and not its original location.

Locations of home grounds for teams in Cypriot First Division 2009–10

Team	Location	Venue	Capacity
AEL Limassol	Limassol	Tsirion Stadium	13,331
AEP Paphos	Paphos	Pafiako Stadium	10,000
Anorthosis	Larnaca	Antonis Papadopoulos Stadium	10,003
APEP Pitsilia	Limassol	Tsirion Stadium	13,331
APOEL	Nicosia	GSP Stadium	22,859
Apollon Limassol	Limassol	Tsirion Stadium	13,331
APOP Kinyras Peyias	Peyia	Peyia Municipal Stadium	3,828
Aris Limassol	Limassol	Tsirion Stadium	13,331
Doxa Katokopia	Nicosia	Makario Stadium	16,000
Enosis Neon Paralimni	Paralimni	Tasos Markou Stadium	5,800
Ermis Aradippou	Achna	Dasaki Stadium	7,000
Ethnikos Achna	Achna	Dasaki Stadium	7,000
Nea Salamis Famagusta	Larnaca	Ammochostos Stadium	5,500
Omonia	Nicosia	GSP Stadium	22,859

=== Personnel and sponsoring ===
Club	Head coach	Team captain	Kitmaker	Shirt sponsor
AEL Limassol	(Czech Republic) Dušan Uhrin, Jr.	(Bosnia and Herzegovina) Dušan Kerkez	Mass	Sinergatiko Tamieftirio Lemesou
AEP Paphos	(Cyprus) Demetris Ioannou	(Cyprus) Giorgos Georgiou	Puma	Sinergatiko Tamieftirio Paphou
Anorthosis	(Cyprus) Nikos Nicolaou	(Greece) Nikos Katsavakis	Puma	Betfair
APEP Pitsilia	(Cyprus) Stephen Constantine	(Cyprus) Giorgos Constanti	Legea	KKCG
APOEL	(Serbia) Ivan Jovanović	(Cyprus) Marinos Satsias	Puma	MTN
Apollon Limassol	(Serbia) Slobodan Krčmarević	(Argentina) Gastón Sangoy	Lotto	Columbia
APOP Kinyras Peyias	(Cyprus) Giorgos Polyviou	(Greece) Theodoros Galanis	Puma	PrimeTel
Aris Limassol	(Cyprus) Tasos Kyriakou	(Cyprus) Giorgos Vasiliou	Kappa	John Theodorou Developers Ltd
Doxa Katokopia	(Cyprus) Charalambos Christodoulou	(Cyprus) Kyriacos Polykarpou	Puma	Cytanet
Enosis Neon Paralimni	(North Macedonia) Čedomir Janevski	(Cyprus) Demos Goumenos	Lotto	Entegro Cyprus Ltd
Ermis Aradippou	(Serbia) Dusan Mitošević	(Cyprus) Lambros Lambrou	Legea	Raquel
Ethnikos Achna	(Serbia) Svetozar Šapurić	(Cyprus) Christos Poyiatzis	Nike	Famagusta Developers
Nea Salamis Famagusta	(Israel) Nir Klinger	(Cyprus) Liasos Louka	Puma	CytaVision
Omonia	(Greece) Takis Lemonis	(Cyprus) Elias Charalambous	Lotto	Ocean Tankers

=== Managerial changes ===
The following list represents every head coach change for any team during the season (1 July 2009 – 30 June 2010).

Team	Outgoing manager	Manner of departure	Date of vacancy	Replaced by	Date of appointment
Nea Salamina	(Cyprus) Michalis Hadjipieris	Mutual Consent	April 24, 2009	(Hungary) Attila Supka	April 24, 2009
Anorthosis FC	(Cyprus) Michalis Pamboris	Mutual Consent	May 7, 2009	(Germany) Ernst Middendorp	May 7, 2009
Aris Limassol	(Cyprus) Akis Agiomamitis	Sacked	May 17, 2009	(Cyprus) Marios Constantinou	May 17, 2009
AEL Limassol	(Romania) Mihai Stoichiţă	Sacked	May 19, 2009	(Israel) Nir Klinger	May 23, 2009
APEP Pitsilia	(Netherlands) Willy Scheepers	Mutual Consent	May 26, 2009	(Switzerland) Marc Hodel	May 26, 2009
AEP Paphos	(Israel) Nir Klinger	Mutual Consent	May 23, 2009	(Israel) Eyal Lahman	June 9, 2009
Enosis Neon Paralimni	(Cyprus) Antonis Kleftis & Adamos Adamou	Mutual Consent	June 10, 2009	(North Macedonia) Čedomir Janevski	June 10, 2009
Ethnikos Achna	(Belgium) Stéphane Demol	End of Contract	May 9, 2009	(Cyprus) Panicos Orphanides	June 11, 2009
Anorthosis FC	(Germany) Ernst Middendorp	Sacked	July 24, 2009	(Serbia) Slavoljub Muslin	August 7, 2009
APEP Pitsilia	(Switzerland) Marc Hodel	Sacked	August 24, 2009	(Cyprus) Nikos Andronikou	September 3, 2009
AEP Paphos	(Israel) Eyal Lahman	Sacked	September 6, 2009	(Cyprus) Tasos Kyriakou	September 8, 2009
Ethnikos Achna	(Cyprus) Panicos Orphanides	Resigned	September 27, 2009	(Serbia) Svetozar Šapurić	September 29, 2009
Ermis Aradippou	(Cyprus) Yiannos Stavrinou	Sacked	September 27, 2009	(Serbia) Dusan Mitošević	September 30, 2009
Nea Salamina	(Hungary) Attila Supka	Sacked	November 1, 2009	(Serbia) Mirko Mihic	November 2, 2009
APEP Pitsilia	(Cyprus) Nikos Andronikou	Mutual Consent	December 8, 2009	(Cyprus) Venizelos Tsiambazis	December 9, 2009
Nea Salamina	(Serbia) Mirko Mihic	Mutual Consent	December 21, 2009	(Cyprus) Louis Stefanis	December 22, 2009
AEL Limassol	(Israel) Nir Klinger	Mutual Consent	December 28, 2009	(Czech Republic) Dušan Uhrin, Jr.	December 30, 2009
Nea Salamina	(Cyprus) Louis Stefanis	Mutual Consent	December 30, 2009	(Israel) Nir Klinger	December 30, 2009
APEP Pitsilia	(Cyprus) Venizelos Tsiambazis	Mutual Consent	January 5, 2010	(Cyprus) Stephen Constantine	January 5, 2010
Aris Limassol	(Cyprus) Marios Constantinou	Mutual Consent	January 18, 2010	(Belgium) Stéphane Demol	January 20, 2010
Apollon Limassol	(Germany) Thomas von Heesen	Mutual Consent	January 28, 2010	(Serbia) Slobodan Krčmarević	February 2, 2010
AEP Paphos	(Cyprus) Tasos Kyriakou	Sacked	February 1, 2010	(Greece) Savvas Kofidis	February 3, 2010
Anorthosis FC	(Serbia) Slavoljub Muslin	Sacked	February 18, 2010	(Cyprus) Nikos Nicolaou	February 18, 2010
Aris Limassol	(Belgium) Stéphane Demol	Sacked	March 21, 2010	(Cyprus) Tasos Kyriakou	March 21, 2010
AEP Paphos	(Greece) Savvas Kofidis	Sacked	March 28, 2010	(Cyprus) Demetris Ioannou	March 29, 2010

== First round ==
=== League table ===
Pos	Team	Pld	W	D	L	GF	GA	GD	Pts	Qualification or relegation
1	Omonia Nicosia	26	19	5	2	52	21	+31	62	Qualification for second round, Group A
2	Anorthosis Famagusta	26	18	4	4	45	20	+25	58	Qualification for second round, Group A
3	Apollon Limassol	26	17	6	3	43	15	+28	57	Qualification for second round, Group A
4	APOEL	26	16	7	3	46	18	+28	55	Qualification for second round, Group A
5	AEL Limassol	26	14	3	9	32	22	+10	45	Qualification for second round, Group B
6	APOP Kinyras	26	10	4	12	40	44	−4	34	Qualification for second round, Group B
7	Ethnikos Achna	26	8	7	11	23	31	−8	31	Qualification for second round, Group B
8	Enosis Neon Paralimni	26	7	8	11	29	35	−6	29 (Note: ENP 2–0 ERM; ERM 1–0 ENP)	Qualification for second round, Group B
9	Ermis Aradippou	26	7	8	11	31	34	−3	29	Qualification for second round, Group C
10	Doxa Katokopias	26	6	8	12	25	37	−12	26 (Note: AEP 1–2 DOX; DOX 2–2 AEP)	Qualification for second round, Group C
11	AEP Paphos	26	6	8	12	27	40	−13	26	Qualification for second round, Group C
12	Aris Limassol	26	4	8	14	26	47	−21	20	Qualification for second round, Group C
13	Nea Salamis Famagusta (R)	26	2	8	16	19	45	−26	14	Relegation to Cypriot Second Division
14	APEP (Note: APEP were docked six points because their players walked off the pitch before the end of a match against Ethnikos to protest the officiating.) (R)	26	4	4	18	25	54	−29	10	Relegation to Cypriot Second Division

Source: UEFA
Rules for classification: 1) points; 2) head-to-head points; 3) head-to-head goal difference; 4) head-to-head goals scored; 5) goal difference; 6) number of goals scored.
Qualified teams for Group A will play for one spot for the second qualifying round of the UEFA Champions League and two spots for the UEFA Europa League, one for the second and one for the first qualifying round.
A spot in the third qualifying round of UEFA Europa League will be awarded to the winners of the 2009–10 Cypriot Cup.
Qualified teams for Group C will play for one additional relegation spot.
Points gained in the First Round will be taken over into the Second Round groups.
(R) Relegated

=== Results ===
Home \ Away	AEL	AEP	ANO	APEP	APOE	APOL	APOP	ARI	DOX	ENP	ERM	ETH	NSL	OMO
AEL Limassol		3–1	0–1	2–0	1–2	0–0	2–0	1–0	1–0	2–1	2–1	2–2	3–1	1–0
AEP Paphos	1–0		0–2	2–1	0–1	1–2	3–2	1–3	1–2	2–0	3–1	0–0	0–1	1–3
Anorthosis Famagusta	1–0	3–0		3–0	0–0	1–1	2–1	3–1	3–0	2–0	1–0	2–1	4–1	1–3
APEP F.C.	0–1	3–3	0–2		1–4	0–4	2–3	2–1	0–0	1–2	3–3	0–3 (Note: The match was awarded to Ethnikos by 3–0 because APEP's players walked off the pitch to protest the officiating.)	2–1	1–1
APOEL	1–0	0–0	2–0	3–1		1–1	3–1	5–0	3–0	3–1	1–0	2–0	0–0	1–2
Apollon Limassol	0–2	0–0	2–0	2–0	2–0		1–0	3–0	2–0	1–1	2–1	3–1	4–1	0–1
APOP Kinyras	1–0	0–0	2–0	1–2	4–3	1–3		1–1	2–2	1–2	1–1	3–0	2–1	1–3
Aris Limassol	0–0	2–1	0–3	2–0	0–2	1–1	2–4		1–4	1–1	2–2	0–0	3–1	0–1
Doxa Katokopias	1–0	2–2	2–3	1–0	1–2	0–1	1–2	0–0		2–2	1–1	1–0	0–0	2–4
Enosis Neon Paralimni	1–2	5–1	1–2	2–0	1–1	0–3	3–1	1–0	1–1		2–0	1–2	1–1	0–4
Ermis Aradippou	1–0	0–0	0–0	2–1	1–2	1–2	2–3	5–3	2–1	1–0		1–0	1–1	1–2
Ethnikos Achna	1–4	1–2	1–3	1–0	0–0	0–1	3–1	0–0	1–0	1–0	0–0		2–1	2–1
Nea Salamis Famagusta	1–3	0–0	1–2	1–2	0–3 (Note: The match was awarded to APOEL by 3–0 after it was abandoned in the 76th minute due to a pitch invasion by Salamis' fans.)	0–1	1–2	3–2	0–1	0–0	0–3	1–1		0–2
Omonia Nicosia	4–0	3–2	1–1	4–3	1–1	2–1	1–0	2–1	3–0	0–0	1–0	2–0	1–1	

Legend: Blue = home team win; Yellow = draw; Red = away team win.

== Second round ==
=== Group A ===
==== Table ====
Pos	Team	Pld	W	D	L	GF	GA	GD	Pts	Qualification
1	Omonia Nicosia (C)	32	22	8	2	60	25	+35	74	Qualification for Champions League second qualifying round
2	APOEL	32	19	8	5	53	24	+29	65	Qualification for Europa League second qualifying round
3	Anorthosis Famagusta	32	19	7	6	51	27	+24	64	Qualification for Europa League first qualifying round
4	Apollon Limassol	32	17	9	6	47	23	+24	60	Qualification for Europa League third qualifying round (Note: Apollon Limassol qualified for the third qualifying round of the 2010–11 UEFA Europa League after winning the 2009–10 Cypriot Cup.)

Rules for classification: 1) points; 2) head-to-head points; 3) head-to-head goal difference; 4) head-to-head goals scored; 5) goal difference; 6) number of goals scored.
(C) Champions

==== Results ====
Home \ Away	ANO	APOE	APOL	OMO
Anorthosis Famagusta		1–1	2–0	2–4
APOEL	1–0		3–2	0–1
Apollon Limassol	0–0	1–2		0–0
Omonia Nicosia	1–1	1–0	1–1	

Legend: Blue = home team win; Yellow = draw; Red = away team win.

=== Group B ===
==== Table ====
Pos	Team	Pld	W	D	L	GF	GA	GD	Pts
5	AEL Limassol	32	18	4	10	50	33	+17	58
6	Enosis Neon Paralimni	32	10	10	12	40	42	−2	40
7	Ethnikos Achna	32	10	8	14	34	42	−8	38
8	APOP Kinyras	32	11	4	17	50	65	−15	37

Rules for classification: 1) points; 2) head-to-head points; 3) head-to-head goal difference; 4) head-to-head goals scored; 5) goal difference; 6) number of goals scored.

==== Results ====
Home \ Away	AEL	APOP	ENP	ETH
AEL Limassol		4–2	2–2	1–0
APOP Kinyras	2–5		1–2	3–2
Enosis Neon Paralimni	1–3	4–0		1–1
Ethnikos Achna	4–3	4–2	0–1	

Legend: Blue = home team win; Yellow = draw; Red = away team win.

=== Group C ===
==== Table ====
Pos	Team	Pld	W	D	L	GF	GA	GD	Pts	Relegation
9	Ermis Aradippou	32	12	8	12	43	38	+5	44	
10	AEP Paphos	32	9	9	14	39	50	−11	36	
11	Doxa Katokopias	32	9	8	15	36	46	−10	35	
12	Aris Limassol (R)	32	4	9	19	30	63	−33	21	Relegation to Cypriot Second Division

Rules for classification: 1) points; 2) head-to-head points; 3) head-to-head goal difference; 4) head-to-head goals scored; 5) goal difference; 6) number of goals scored.
(R) Relegated

==== Results ====
Home \ Away	AEP	ARI	DOX	ERM
AEP Paphos		3–2	4–1	3–0
Aris Limassol	2–2		0–2	0–2
Doxa Katokopias	4–0	3–0		1–4
Ermis Aradippou	1–0	4–0	1–0	

Legend: Blue = home team win; Yellow = draw; Red = away team win.

== Top goalscorers ==
Including matches played on 8 May 2010; Source: CFA official website

Rank	Player	Club	Goals
1	(Cape Verde) José Semedo	APOP Kinyras	22
1	(Brazil) Joeano	Ermis	22
3	(Argentina) Gastón Sangoy	Apollon	13
4	(Serbia) Nenad Mirosavljević	APOEL	11
4	(Cyprus) Michalis Konstantinou	Omonia	11
4	(Cyprus) Efstathios Aloneftis	Omonia	11
4	(Belgium) Dieter Van Tornhout	Enosis	11
8	(Cyprus) Christos Marangos	Anorthosis	10
8	(Portugal) José Henrique	Doxa	10
8	(Angola) Freddy	AEL	10
8	(Cape Verde) Cafú	Anorthosis	10
8	(Cyprus) Andreas Avraam	Apollon	10

== Attendances ==
#	Club	Average
1	Omonoia	10,373
2	APOEL	7,560
3	Anorthosis	5,625
4	Apollon Limassol	4,908
5	AEL	3,491
6	Nea Salamina	1,800
7	APOP	1,510
8	APEP	1,276
9	Aris Limassol	1,064
10	Ermis	1,064
11	Paphos	968
12	Doxa Katokopias	919
13	Ethnikos Achnas	911
14	ENP	833

== See also ==
- 2009–10 Cypriot Cup
- 2009–10 Cypriot Second Division
- List of Cypriot football transfers summer 2009

== Sources ==
- "2009/10 Cypriot First Division". Rec.Sport.Soccer Statistics Foundation. 2016-01-14.
