= Marios Constantinou =

Cypriot footballer

Personal information
- Full name: Marios Constantinou
- Date of birth: 14 July 1967 (age 59)
- Place of birth: Famagusta, Cyprus
- Height: 1.83 m (6 ft 0 in)
- Position: Defensive midfielder

Youth career
- 1981–1984: Pezoporikos

Senior career*
Years	Team	Apps	(Gls)
1984–1994	Pezoporikos	204	(12)
1994–1996	AEK Larnaca	53	(2)
1996–1997	Ethnikos Achnas	6	(0)
1997–1998	Omonia Aradippou	25	(1)

International career
1991	Cyprus	1	(0)

Managerial career
- 2000–2001: AEK Larnaca (assistant manager)
- 2001–2005: Digenis Morphou
- 2005: APOEL
- 2005–2007: AEK Larnaca
- 2007–2008: Enosis Neon Paralimni
- 2009–2010: Aris Limassol
- 2010: Alki Larnaca
- 2011–2012: Doxa Katokopias
- 2013: Olympiakos Nicosia
- 2014: Enosis Neon Paralimni
- 2014–2015: Omonia Aradippou
- * Club domestic league appearances and goals

Marios Constantinou (Greek: Μάριος Κωνσταντίνου; born on 14 July 1967) is a former international Cypriot football midfielder and current manager. He is a holder of the UEFA Pro Licence. In the past he was footballer of Pezoporikos and AEK Larnaca under the instructions of the first coach of AEK Larnaca Andreas Mouskallis. He also played for Ethnikos Achna and Omonia Aradippou having just one appearance with Cyprus national football team. From April 2016 he is working for Cyprus Football Association Technical Department and in Coaching Education.

== Managerial career ==
=== Digenis Morphou ===
He took the technical leadership of Digenis Morphou on the verge of destruction in 2001, he managed to promote the team to the Cypriot First Division. During the period 2004–05 – which was the last season in the team from Morphou-he raised the team in the fifth place of the league and leading it to the Cup Final of the Cypriot Cup. Of course, this opened the interest of APOEL after the resignation of Werner Lorant as coach, leaving up to the goalkeeper of that team Digenis Savvas Constantinou in the post.

=== APOEL ===
In APOEL he work only 6 months as coach. He led the team to the First round of UEFA Cup by knocking out Birkirkara F.C. in the first qualifying round and Maccabi Tel Aviv in the second qualifying round. In first round APOEL excluded from Hertha Berlin. With Marios Constantinou as manager APOEL was at second place undefeated and have only four goals against in ten matches. Next stop of his career was AEK Larnaca.

=== AEK Larnaca ===
Having players like Narcis Răducan, Ismail Ba and Azubuike Oliseh led the team in the cup final, as well as Digenis Morphou last season, against APOEL, his previous team. With APOEL winning 3–2 at extra time with the scorer Sása Jovanović in 111' with AEK have complaints to arbitration.

==== Season 2006–07 ====
Mustapha Kamal N'Daw, Donny de Groot, Jatto Ceesay and other players acquired by AEK Larnaca enthuse the fans of the team after they sent it to the semi-finals which was knocked out from the Anorthosis 2–1,1–1. Until a few weeks before the end of the league, he decided to use some young players, was in 4th place and fall until 7th.

==== Season 2007–08 ====
===== 2nd Day =====
In the second match, AEK faced Omonia at the GSP Stadium. AEK led 2–1, but with about ten minutes remaining they were reduced to nine players, after José Manuel Rey received a second yellow card and was sent off. AEK lost the match 3–2.

===== 3rd Day =====
Where stopped AEK continued to the next match against AEL in Larnaca which leaves other two valuable points to lose and already beginning to lose ground from the beginning. The equal result with AEL 2–2 intensify the tension that exists in the club. Marios Constantinou away from the limelight of publicity gives the resignation which is not acceptable.

===== 4th Day =====
In the fourth game with the Doxa, technical leadership officially give the resignation, which is irrevocable after the game (result 3–3). A characteristic fact is that every time AEK scored the "other AEK" scored against our group bringing the game to equal. In his statements Marios Constantinou said that leaves bitter from AEK, not so much on the attitude of some players but the attitude of some executives who do not want him in the team. At that time we had no to say something and tried to keep low profile in the interest of the team. Here ends a period led by Marios Constantinou who goes to Enosis Neon Paralimni and leaves behind him that he built from the start of the season.

=== Enosis Neon Paralimni ===
On 7 December 2008, he resigned from Enosis Neon Paralimni taking all responsibility after consecutive bad results.

=== Aris Limassol ===
On 17 May 2009, the administration of Aris Limassol decided that he is going to be the manager of the team for the season 2009–2010. Aris did not have good results so on 18 January 2010, Marios Constantinou and the president of the team Kyriacos Hadjikyriacos decided to separate their contract.

=== Alki Larnaca ===
On 14 March 2010, the administration of Alki Larnaca announced its agreement, for three years, with the manager Mr. Marios Constantinou. On 19 October 2010, he resigned from the technical leadership of the team, with his letter to the technical director Vesko Mihajlović.

=== Doxa Katokopias ===
On 21 March 2011, the administrative council of Doxa Katokopias decided that Marios Constantinou will undertake as manager of Doxa with the Greek former footballer Georgios Kostis as assistant. In his first five matches as the coach of Doxa in the Second Division he made it very well. Doxa is at top of the league and undefeated. The team in five games counts four wins, 1 draw with the first striking line with twelve goals. He brought to the team young and talented players especially from Portugal, such as Abel Pereira, Tiago Conceição, Nino Osmanagić and Adul Baldé. Doxa having its promotion to the Cypriot First Division secured, finished in the second place of Cypriot Second Division losing the club's first title after defeating by Ayia Napa F.C. on the last matchday. On 1 November 2012 he undertook his responsibilities after the elimination from Anagennisi Dherynia for the Cypriot Cup and resigned from the club. Few hours later Doxa hired Loukas Hadjiloukas in his place whose wished to succeed.

=== Olympiakos Nicosia ===
On 10 February 2013 Olympiakos sacked Renos Demetriades after home defeat from Enosis Neon Paralimni (2–3) and made an official offer to Marios Constantinou to replace him. The next day Constantinou accepted the offer from Olympiakos and begun his efforts to help his new team to avoid relegation. Constantinou left Olympiakos after the team's relegation at the end of the season.

== Honours ==
=== As footballer ===
Pezoporikos

- Cypriot Championship: 1988

AEK Larnaca

- Cypriot Cup runners-up: 1996

=== As manager ===
AEK Larnaca

- Cypriot Cup: runners-up 2006; semi-finals 2007

Digenis Morphou

- Cypriot Second Division: runners-up 2002
- Cypriot Cup: runners-up 2005

Alki Larnaca

- Cypriot Second Division: 2010

Doxa Katokopias

- Cypriot Second Division: runner-up 2012
