= Andreas Mavris =

Cypriot footballer (born 1972)

Personal information
- Full name: Andreas Mavris
- Date of birth: 21 March 1972 (age 54)
- Place of birth: Larnaca, Cyprus
- Position: Goalkeeper

Team information
- Current team: AEL Limassol

Senior career*
Years	Team	Apps	(Gls)
1994–2002	AEK Larnaca	120	(0)
2005–2006	THOI Lakatamia	0	(0)
2006	Olympiakos Nicosia	4	(0)
2006–2007	Alki Larnaca	23	(0)
2007–2010	Doxa Katokopias	7	(0)

International career^{‡}
1996–1997	Cyprus	5	(0)
- * Club domestic league appearances and goals as of 4 December 2007 ‡ National team caps and goals as of 4 December 2007

Andreas Mavris (Greek: Ανδρέας Μαυρής) (born 21 March 1972) is a former Cypriot goalkeeper currently a Goalkeeping coach for AEL Limassol of Cyprus working closely with manager Pambos Christodoulou, previously he was coach at Olympiakos Nicosia and Doxa Katokopias. His former teams as a goalkeeper were AEK Larnaca, THOI Lakatamia, Olympiakos Nicosia, Alki Larnaca FC and Doxa Katokopias.
