= 2009–10 Cypriot Second Division =

Cypriot Second Division
- Season: 2009–10
- Champions: Alki (4th title)
- Promoted: Alki; AEK; Olympiakos
- Relegated: Frenaros; Ayia Napa; MEAP

The 2009–10 Cypriot Second Division was the 55th season of the Cypriot second-level football league. It started in September 2009 and finished in May 2010. Alki Larnaca won their 4th title.

== Team Changes from 2008–09 ==
Teams promoted to 2009–10 Cypriot First Division

- Ermis Aradippou
- Aris Limassol
- Nea Salamina

Teams relegated from 2008–09 Cypriot First Division

- Alki Larnaca
- AEK Larnaca
- Atromitos Yeroskipou

Teams promoted from Cypriot Third Division 2008–09

- Champions: Akritas Chlorakas
- Runners-up: Frenaros FC, Othellos Athienou

Teams relegated to Cypriot Third Division 2009–10

- Chalkanoras Idaliou
- THOI Lakatamia
- Ethnikos Assia

== Overview ==
=== Personnel and stadia ===
Club	Chairman	Head coach	Venue
AEK	Marios Ellinas	Andreas Michaelides	Neo GSZ Stadium
Akritas	Loukas Yioukkas	Saša Jovanović	Koinotiko Chlorakas
Alki	Nikos Lillis	Radmilo Ivančević	Neo GSZ Stadium
ASIL	Andreas Charalambous	Loukas Hadjiloukas	Grigoris Afxentiou Stadium
Atromitos	Tasos Kouzoupos	Gjoko Hadžievski	Yeroskipou Stadium
Ayia Napa	Christakis Antoniou	Antonis Kleftis	Municipal Stadium (Ayia Napa)
Digenis	Andreas Papacharalambous	Arsen Mihailovic	Makario Stadium
Frenaros	Marios Karayiannas	Nikos Kolompourdas	Koinotiko Sotiras
MEAP	Koulis Poyiadjis	Yiannos Kalotheou	Theodorio Koinotiko
Olympiakos	Petros Savva	Nikodimos Papavasiliou	New GSP Stadium
Omonia Ar.	Giorgos Hadjimattheou	Nontas Christinakis	Aradippou Stadium
Onisilos	Giorgos Solomou	Costas Lambis	Koinotiko Sotiras
Othellos	Dimitris Fiakkos	Giorgos Kosmas	Athienou Stadium
PAEEK FC	Kleanthis Georgiades	Costas Sakkas	Keryneia Epistrophi

== League table ==
Pos	Team	Pld	W	D	L	GF	GA	GD	Pts	Qualification or relegation
1	Alki Larnaca	26	17	4	5	44	24	+20	55	Qualified for promotion group
2	AEK Larnaca	26	14	5	7	41	20	+21	47	Qualified for promotion group
3	Olympiakos Nicosia	26	12	8	6	45	34	+11	44	Qualified for promotion group
4	Othellos Athienou	26	10	9	7	31	28	+3	39	Qualified for promotion group
5	Atromitos Yeroskipou	26	10	7	9	35	31	+4	37	
6	Omonia Aradippou	26	9	9	8	26	28	−2	36	
7	PAEEK FC	26	9	9	8	24	27	−3	36	
8	Digenis Morphou	26	9	9	8	35	33	+2	36	
9	ASIL Lysi	26	8	11	7	29	29	0	35	
10	Onisilos Sotira	26	9	6	11	30	31	−1	33	
11	Akritas Chlorakas	26	7	11	8	25	26	−1	32	
12	Frenaros FC (R)	26	7	7	12	26	32	−6	28	Relegation to Cypriot Third Division
13	Ayia Napa (R)	26	5	5	16	19	41	−22	20	Relegation to Cypriot Third Division
14	MEAP Nisou (R)	26	2	8	16	19	45	−26	14	Relegation to Cypriot Third Division

Source: soccerway.com
(R) Relegated

=== Promotion group ===
Pos	Team	Pld	W	D	L	GF	GA	GD	Pts	Promotion
1	Alki Larnaca (C)	32	19	7	6	52	33	+19	64	Promotion to Cypriot First Division
2	AEK Larnaca	32	17	6	9	49	27	+22	57	Promotion to Cypriot First Division
3	Olympiakos Nicosia	32	14	9	9	55	43	+12	51	Promotion to Cypriot First Division
4	Othellos Athienou	32	12	10	10	40	38	+2	46	

Source: CFA
(C) Champions

== See also ==
- 2009–10 Cypriot First Division
- 2009–10 Cypriot Cup

== Sources ==
- "2009/10 Cypriot Second Division". Rec.Sport.Soccer Statistics Foundation. 2016-01-14.
