= 2011–12 Cypriot Second Division =

Cypriot Second Division
- Season: 2011–12
- Champions: Ayia Napa (1st title)
- Promoted: Ayia Napa; Doxa; AEP
- Relegated: APOP Kinyras; EN Parekklisia; Atromitos
- Top goalscorer: Andreas Kyprianou (13 goals)

The 2011–12 Cypriot Second Division was the 57th season of the Cypriot second-level football league. Ayia Napa won their 1st title.

== Team Changes from 2010–11 ==
Teams promoted to 2011–12 Cypriot First Division

- Aris Limassol
- Nea Salamina
- Anagennisi Deryneia

Teams relegated from 2010–11 Cypriot First Division

- AEP Paphos
- Doxa Katokopias
- APOP Kinyras

Teams promoted from 2010–11 Cypriot Third Division

- Champions: Ethnikos Assia
- Runners-up: Enosis Neon Parekklisia, Ayia Napa

Teams relegated to 2011–12 Cypriot Third Division

- ASIL Lysi
- Digenis Morphou
- Adonis Idaliou

== League table ==
Pos	Team	Pld	W	D	L	GF	GA	GD	Pts	Qualification or relegation
1	Doxa Katokopias	26	14	8	4	36	20	+16	50	Qualification for promotion group
2	Ayia Napa	26	14	7	5	39	17	+22	49	Qualification for promotion group
3	AEP Paphos	26	15	4	7	40	23	+17	49	Qualification for promotion group
4	PAEEK FC	26	9	9	8	24	28	−4	36	Qualification for promotion group
5	Onisilos Sotira	26	9	7	10	23	26	−3	34	
6	Othellos Athienou	26	9	7	10	30	31	−1	34	
7	Akritas Chlorakas	26	9	7	10	37	40	−3	34	
8	Ethnikos Assia	26	9	7	10	29	38	−9	34	
9	APEP	26	9	6	11	26	38	−12	33	
10	Omonia Aradippou	26	7	11	8	40	34	+6	32	
11	Chalkanoras Idaliou	26	6	14	6	28	29	−1	32	
12	APOP Kinyras (Note: APOP Kinyras started the league with six points deduction because they did not met the financial criteria. On 6 October 2011, three extra points were deducted from APOP Kinyras because of FIFA decision. On 2 April 2012, APOP Kinyras were deducted three extra points because of another FIFA decision. source) (R)	26	13	4	9	41	23	+18	31	Relegated to Cypriot Third Division
13	Enosis Neon Parekklisia (R)	26	7	7	12	21	33	−12	28	Relegated to Cypriot Third Division
14	Atromitos Yeroskipou (Note: On 29 March 2012, Atromitos Yeroskipou were deducted three points because of FIFA decision.) (R)	26	1	4	21	10	44	−34	4	Relegated to Cypriot Third Division

Source: CFA
(R) Relegated

=== Promotion group ===
Pos	Team	Pld	W	D	L	GF	GA	GD	Pts	Promotion
1	Ayia Napa (C)	32	20	7	5	53	20	+33	67	Promoted to Cypriot First Division
2	Doxa Katokopias (P)	32	18	8	6	47	26	+21	62	Promoted to Cypriot First Division
3	AEP Paphos (P)	32	17	4	11	47	34	+13	55	Promoted to Cypriot First Division
4	PAEEK	32	9	9	14	27	43	−16	36	

Source: CFA
(C) Champions; (P) Promoted

==== Results ====
Home \ Away	AEP	AYN	DOX	PAE
AEP Paphos		1–3	1–2	2–0
Ayia Napa	4–1		2–1	1–0
Doxa Katokopias	1–0	0–1		6–2
PAEEK FC	1–2	0–3	0–1	

Updated to match(es) played on 5 May 2012. Source:
Legend: Blue = home team win; Yellow = draw; Red = away team win.

== Season statistics ==
=== Top scorers ===
Including matches played on March 24, 2012; Source: CFA

Rank	Player	Club	Goals
1	(Cyprus) Andreas Kyprianou	Omonia Aradippou	13
2	(Portugal) Ângelo	Akritas Chlorakas	12
3	(Zimbabwe) Edward Mashinya	APOP Kinyras	11
4	(Guinea-Bissau) Adul Baldé	Doxa Katokopias	9
4	(Portugal) Bonifácio	Doxa Katokopias	9
4	(Cape Verde) Spencer	Ethnikos Assia	9
4	(Portugal) Miguel Vargas	AEP Paphos	9
4	(Portugal) Milton Mendes	PAEEK FC/Doxa Katokopias	9
4	(Cyprus) Kyriacos Chailis	Omonia Aradippou/PAEEK FC	9
4	(Hungary) Lajos Terjék	Ayia Napa	9
4	(Bulgaria) Dormushali Saidhodzha	AEP Paphos	9
12	(Slovakia) Richard Chorvatovič	Onisilos Sotira	7
12	(Zimbabwe) Obadiah Tarumbwa	APOP Kinyras	7
12	(Portugal) Riera	APOP Kinyras	7
12	(Cyprus) Demos Demosthenous	Onisilos Sotira	7
16	(Spain) Juanjo	APEP	6
16	(Democratic Republic of the Congo) Egola Mbela	Othellos	6
16	(Nigeria) Joshua Izuchukwu	APEP	6
16	(Cyprus) Martinos Solomou	Ayia Napa	6
16	(Cyprus) Sotiris Vourkou	PAEEK FC	6

== See also ==
- 2011–12 Cypriot First Division
- 2011–12 Cypriot Cup

== Sources ==
- "2011/12 Cypriot Second Division". Rec.Sport.Soccer Statistics Foundation. 2016-01-14.
