= Pambos Christodoulou =

Cypriot football manager

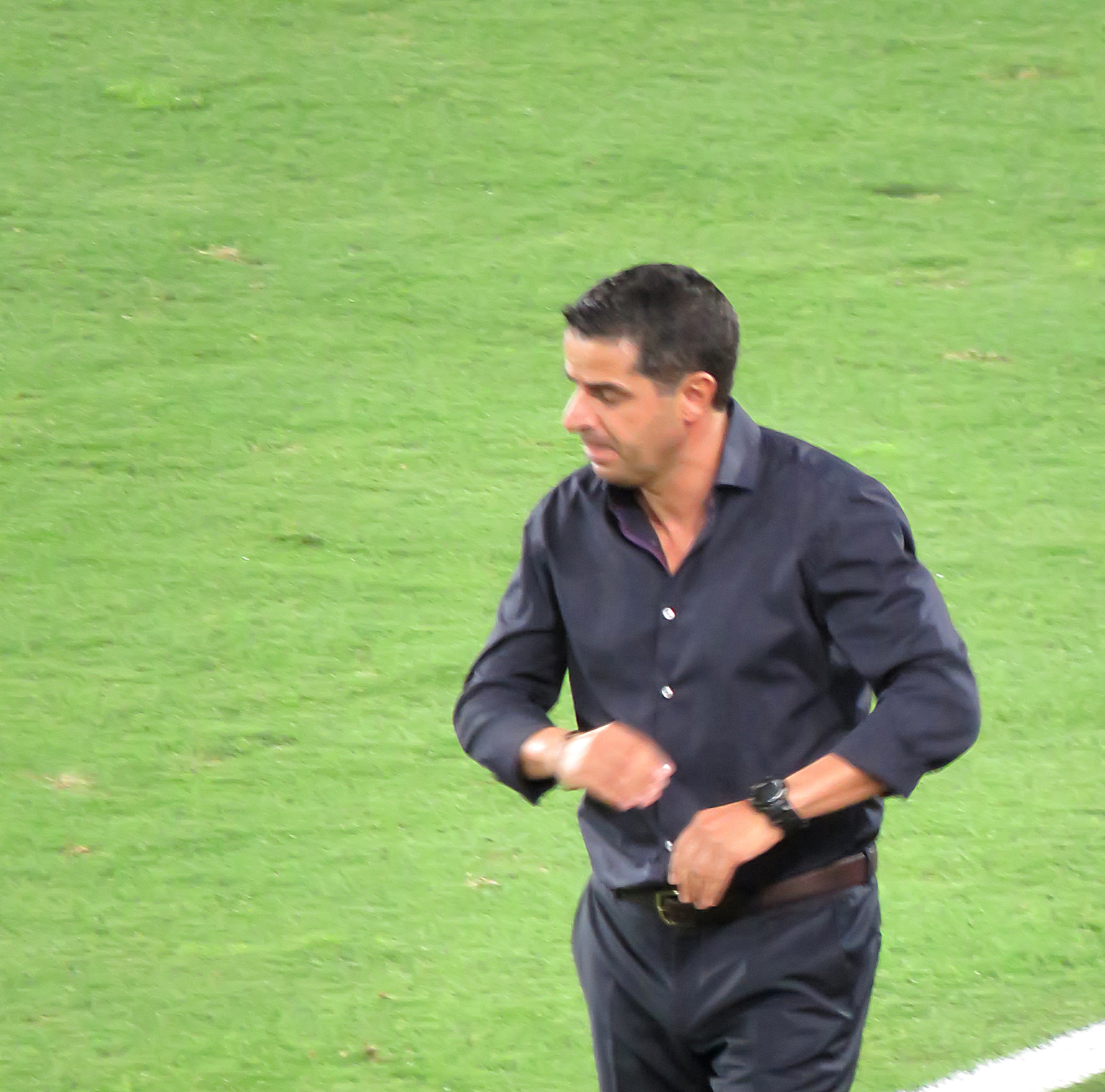
- Christodoulou in 2015

Personal information
- Date of birth: 17 October 1967 (age 59)
- Place of birth: Galata, Cyprus
- Position: Midfielder

Senior career*
Years	Team	Apps	(Gls)
–1989	Doxa Katokopias		
1990–1995	Olympiakos Nicosia		
1996–2002	AEK Larnaca		

Managerial career
- 2006–2010: Doxa Katokopias
- 2010–2011: Olympiakos Nicosia
- 2011–2012: AEL Limassol
- 2013: Anorthosis
- 2014–2015: Cyprus
- 2016–2017: AEL Limassol
- 2017: Omonia
- 2019–2020: Olympiakos Nicosia
- 2020: Nea Salamis Famagusta
- 2021: Sevan
- 2022: Karmiotissa (Director of Football)
- 2022-2023: Ethnikos Achna
- 2023-2024: Olympiakos Nicosia
- 2024: Telavi
- * Club domestic league appearances and goals

Pambos Christodoulou (born 17 October 1967, Galata) is a Cypriot football manager and former player.

== Playing career ==
Christodoulou played as a midfielder for Olympiakos Nicosia in the Cyprus First Division, between 1990–1995, having moved from Doxa Katokopias, which then played in the second division of Cyprus. He subsequently went to AEK Larnaca in the first division, before deciding to become a manager at the age of 39 in the 2006 season for Doxa Katokopias.

== Managerial career ==
=== Doxa Katokopias ===
In 2006, he took on his first managerial appointment with Doxa Katokopia FC then in the Cyprus Second Division. Doxa got promoted finishing 3rd in the last day of the season. In the next season, newly promoted Doxa would be favourite for relegation, however Pambos showed his cunning team building skills. He spent a lot of time in Portugal hunting for players with good technical skills, a good team spirit, with speed and on a low budget. He managed to find such players in the 2nd and 3rd levels in Portugal on a budget that Doxa could afford. The first player he signed was Angolan born Portuguese left back Rui Paulo Silva Júnior, who subsequently became a good friend and after retiring as a footballer would join him as Director of football at AEL Limassol. He used the player agent Costas Christodoulou (Karavidas) to help him bring the players to Cyprus and subsequently learned the tricks of the trade himself, in 2011 the Olympiakos Nicosia supporters club cast doubt on Christodoulou's scouting prowess by claiming that player agent Karavidas in fact finds and signs the players. Chrisodoulou vehemently denies this and is moving legally against the Olympiakos supporters for libel as he claims that Rui Junior and himself scout and find the players. By overhauling Doxa's squad every season and building it nearly from scratch, some have argued this was done to gain more commission for everyone involved from bringing new players every year, but this is disputed as with this strategy he saved minnows Doxa from relegation for three consecutive years. These players mainly hailed from Portugal, Angola and Brazil. Pambos brought some notably good strikers to Cyprus that were crowned as top scorers for Doxa and in the Cypriot First Division such as Brazilians: David, Serjão and Portuguese Henrique as well as Angolan Freddy. He managed with this formula and with his trusted coaching team of: Assistant coach Marios Markou, Goalkeeping Coach Andreas Mavris, fitness coach Sotiris Charalambous and Kokos Evripidou and by playing attractive attacking football, against all odds kept Doxa in the Cypriot First Division for a record three consecutive years. When he left in 2010, something that underlies his good team building skills, for a bigger challenge in his career with Olympiakos Nicosia, Doxa was relegated back to the Cypriot Second Division.

=== Olympiakos Nicosia ===
In the 2010–2011 season, Pambos Christodoulou, an old Olympiakos player and ex-manager of Doxa Katokopias, together with his coaching team mentioned above, became manager of Olympiakos Nicosia. He brought with him from Doxa the following players: Brazilian defender, Rodrigo, Portuguese left back Pedro Duarte, Portuguese winger Carlos André, Cypriot holding midfielder Kyriakos Polykarpou and an old Olympiakos Nicosia player for many years, Defensive allrounder Nikolas Nicolaou, to form the basis of his new squad. He overhauled the squad bringing in players from Portugal, Brazil, Angola and Nigerian and Cameroon strikers. As well as left back and best friend Rui Paulo Silva Júnior, Olympiakos showed good attacking football in the 2010–2011 season, easily avoiding relegation and having qualified for the Cup quarterfinals. The club played fluid attacking football having the third best attacking record after leaders APOEL and 3rd placed Anorthosis, playing with a 4–4–2 formation with pressing from within the opponent's half, but the Achilles heel of the team that year had been the bad defensive record with goals conceded in most games and the third worst record in this area. Christodoulou decided to leave the club in 2011 together with all his coaching team and Rui Paulo Silva Júnior, who retired as a footballer to become Director of Football, but without his assistant manager Marios Markou who stayed on at Olympiakos, to join AEL Limassol, one year before his contract expired. Olympiakos Nicosia decided to pursue this breach in court. Subsequently AEL offered compensation via an out of court settlement offering an undisclosed sum of money to Olympiakos for the release of Christodoulou. The offer was accepted by Olympiakos and Christodoulou, officially coaches AEL for the 2011 – 2012 season.

=== AEL Limassol ===
In 2011, he decided to make what he personally believed as a big step and big risk in his career. He moved to one of the clubs of Cyprus with a large following, AEL Limassol together with the coaching team mentioned above, except assistant Marios Markou. He started his rebuilding of AEL in the usual fashion, bringing as a basis players that played for him in Doxa such as Brazilian winger Edmar, Cypriot winger Georgios Eleftheriou and together with players that he had originally brought to Cyprus for Doxa and were now at AEL such as Portuguese striker Henrique formed the basis of his new team. To these he added many players from the Portuguese 2nd level as well as keeping around 8 players already at AEL and adding 2 non Portuguese based players striker Cafu from Anorthosis Famagusta and star Goalkeeper Matías Omar Degra from Greek side Asteras Tripolis At pre-season interviews Pambos expressed his great desire to succeed at AEL by winning titles and has said that the greater budget available to him at this club will help him achieve this. He pleaded patience with his new club's supporters who are notorious for their high expectations. Pambos has acknowledged that moving to AEL is a great risk as the club is well known for its frequent managerial changes in the past 10 years, however, the fact that he is a personal friend of AEL chairman Andreas Sofocleous (as they served their military service together) will give him more goodwill than previous AEL managers. He has disclosed that a secret of his success is to manage the wage bill of his players so all players earn just about the same amount, also players who are younger and relatively less well known are given slightly less to have an incentive to perform to catch up with their team players. All players are signed on a 1+1 year contract with the option with the club to renew thus giving more incentives. No stars are usually signed and the budget is the 4th highest of all Cypriot teams. AEL also qualified for the UEFA Europa league group stage under Pambos. Despite Pambos Christodoulou's achievements at AEL, Andreas Sofocleous the AEL chairman removed Pambos from the managerial position on 22 October 2012 for undisclosed reasons and with mutual consent.

=== Title Winner ===
He had a strong first season at AEL, not conceding any goals in the first five games. At the end of the second round AEL finished top of the table 3 points clear of the second placed team, conceding only 7 goals, the best defensive record of all the league teams. In the play-off round AEL battled with the top 4 teams for the championship winning it with one game to go conceding only 9 goals and is in the cup final. Pambos has managed to bring to AEL the championship crown, which the team last won in 1968, and is in the final of the cup and has achieved cult status among AEL's demanding supporters. For this he is nicknamed by AEL fans "Pambourinho", a combination of his name and of Jose Mourinho.

=== Anorthosis Famagusta ===
On 2 April 2013 – Christodoulou signed a 6 game short term contract with title contenders Anorthosis Famagusta. Hope are that despite being 6 points behind current leaders APOEL – that Pambos will scurry the low esteem the team currently find themselves in, pick up tactics and cover the difference – in time to win the title at the end of the season. At his first four matches, Anorthosis didn't manage to win any game and didn't manage to score any goal also, dropping to third place of the league, two matches before the end. His contract carried a renewal option for the upcoming season but it was not exercised.

=== Cyprus National Football Team ===
On 9 January 2014, Christodoulou was appointed by the Cyprus Football Association as the new national team coach in charge through qualifying for the European Championship of 2016. He shocked everyone as with 1 game to go Cyprus could've gone to the Euro 2016 playoffs, only if they beat Bosnia and Israel lost to Belgium. Belgium demolished Israel 4-0, and even though Cyprus was leading 2-1 at the break, they were ultimately defeated 2-3.

=== AEL Limassol ===
On 8 February 2016 Christodoulou came back to the club, with whom he won the title, for an 18 months contract.

=== AC Omonia ===
On 27 March 2017 Christodoulou was appointed by AC Omonia as the new team manager. Christodoulou will take charge from the beginning of the 2017–18 season. On 5 December 2017, was sacked by the team as a result of the bad performance of the team.

=== Olympiakos Nicosia ===
On 27 May 2019 Christodoulou was re-appointed as manager of Olympiakos Nicosia for one season.

=== Sevan ===
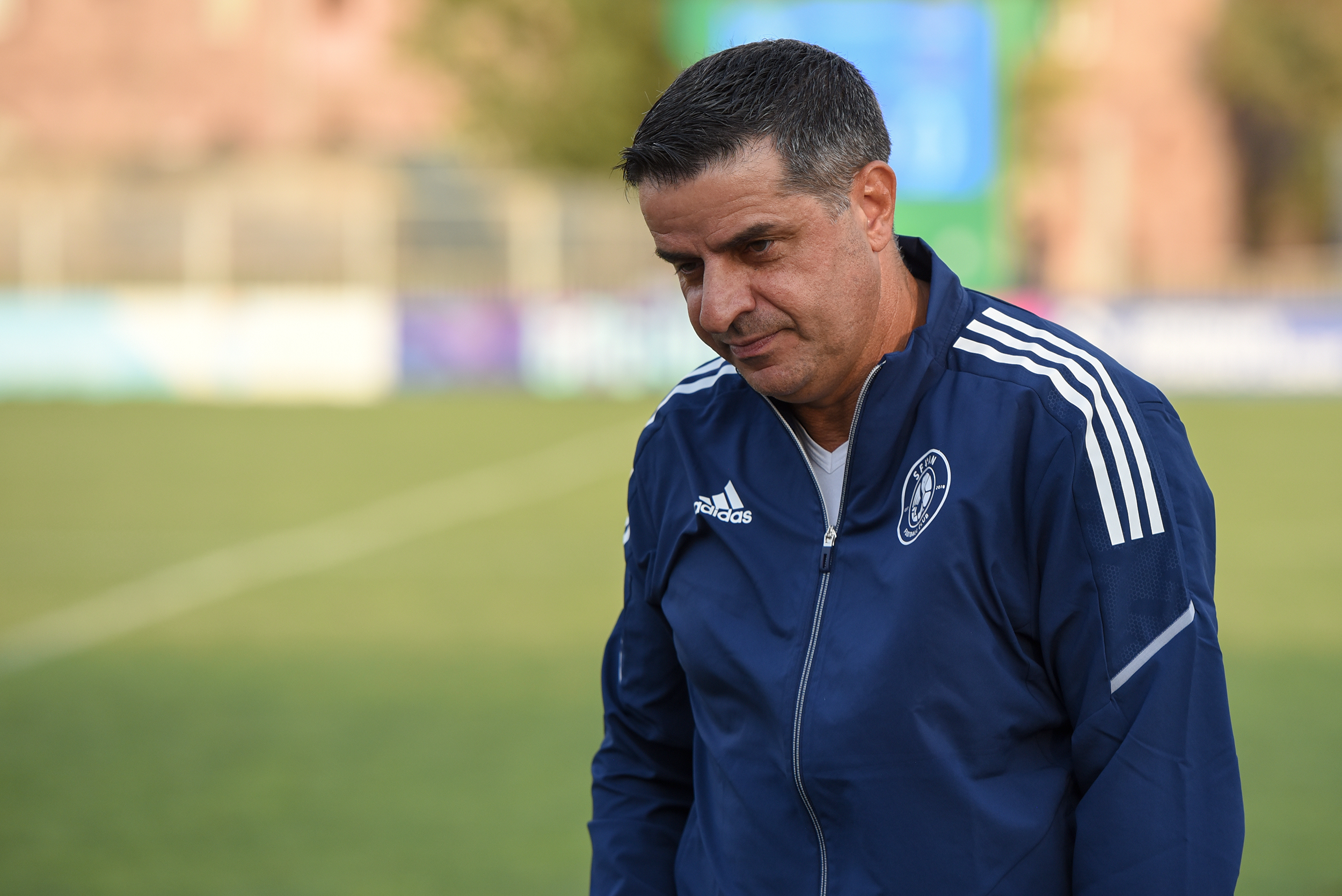
The coach of Sevan FC Charalampos Christodoulou after match against Ararat FC in Nairi stadium during Vbet Armenian Premier league on 19 August 2021

On 11 August 2021, Christodoulou was appointed as the new manager of Armenian Premier League club Sevan.

=== Ethnikos Achna ===
He was appointed at then second division club Ethnikos Achna in the 2022-2023 season and achieved promotion but his contract was not renewed.

== Managerial statistics ==
As of match played 9 March 2024

Managerial record by team and tenure
Team	Nat	From	To	Record					Ref.
Team	Nat	From	To	G	W	D	L	Win %	Ref.
Doxa Katokopias	(Cyprus)	1 July 2006	30 June 2010	133	47	33	53	35.34	
Olympiakos Nicosia	(Cyprus)	1 July 2010	24 March 2011	32	12	11	9	37.50	
AEL Limassol	(Cyprus)	24 March 2011	22 October 2012	61	33	17	11	54.10	
Anorthosis	(Cyprus)	2 April 2013	25 May 2013	6	2	2	2	33.33	
Cyprus	(Cyprus)	9 January 2014	31 October 2015	13	4	1	8	30.77	
AEL Limassol	(Cyprus)	8 February 2016	7 March 2017	45	26	9	10	57.78	
Omonia	(Cyprus)	1 June 2017	5 December 2017	13	5	4	4	38.46	
Olympiakos Nicosia	(Cyprus)	17 June 2019	31 May 2020	26	6	11	9	23.08	
Nea Salamis Famagusta	(Cyprus)	4 June 2020	30 October 2020	9	2	0	7	22.22	
Sevan	(Armenia)	11 August 2021	1 December 2021	12	4	6	2	33.33	
Ethnikos Achnas	(Cyprus)	8 November 2022	4 June 2023	22	13	6	3	59.09	
Olympiakos Nicosia	(Cyprus)	4 June 2023	Present	25	14	5	6	56.00	
Career Total				397	168	105	124	42.32	—

== Honours ==
=== As a manager ===
AEL Limassol

- Cypriot First Division: 2011–12
- Cypriot Cup: Runner-up 2012
