= Georgios Kostis =

Greek footballer

Personal information
- Full name: Georgios Ilias Kostis
- Date of birth: 7 October 1972 (age 54)
- Place of birth: Trikala, Greece
- Position: Midfielder

Senior career*
Years	Team	Apps	(Gls)
1991–1992	1. FC Nürnberg II		
1992–1999	Iraklis		
1999–2003	Panachaiki		
2003–2004	Olympiacos Volos		
2004–2005	Olympiakos Nicosia		
2005–2007	AEP Paphos		
2007–2010	Doxa Katokopias		
2010	Omonia Aradippou		

Managerial career
- 2015–2018: APOEL (assistant)
- 2016: → APOEL (caretaker)
- 2018–2019: APOEL (youth)
- 2018: → APOEL (caretaker)
- 2019: Changchun Yatai (assistant)
- 2023: Telavi
- 2024–2026: Olympiakos Nicosia
- * Club domestic league appearances and goals

Georgios Kostis (Greek: Γεώργιος Κωστής; born 7 October 1972) is a Greek football manager and former player who played as a midfielder.

== Personal ==
His son is Ilias Kostis.
