= Rui Júnior =

Angolan footballer

Personal information
- Full name: Rui Paulo Silva Júnior
- Date of birth: 16 June 1975 (age 51)
- Place of birth: Miconge, Cabinda, Angola
- Height: 1.67 m (5 ft 6 in)
- Position: Left-back

Senior career*
Years	Team	Apps	(Gls)
1995–1996	GDR Fontainhas Cascais		
1996–1997	S.C. Praiense		
1997–1998	Atlético Clube de Portugal		
1998–1998	Operário		
1999–2002	Estoril		
2002–2005	Alverca		
2005–2007	Atlético Clube de Portugal		
2007–2008	Doxa Katokopias		
2008–2010	AEL Limassol		
2010–2011	Olympiakos Nicosia		
- * Club domestic league appearances and goals

Rui Paulo Silva Júnior (born 16 June 1975) is an Angolan former professional footballer who played as a left-back.
