= Varnavas Christofi =

Cypriot footballer (born 1943)

Personal information
- Date of birth: 23 April 1943 (age 83)
- Position: Goalkeeper

Senior career*
| Years | Team | Apps | (Gls) |
| –1967 | Nea Salamina Famagusta FC | | |
| 1968 | Vancouver Royals | | |
| 1969–1974 | Olympiakos Nicosia | | |

International career
| 1966–1973 | Cyprus | 10 | |
- * Club domestic league appearances and goals

Varnavas Christofi (born 23 April 1943) is a retired Cypriot football goalkeeper.
