= Panicos Orphanides =

Cypriot footballer (born 1961)

Panicos Orphanides (born 27 July 1961) is a Cypriot former football manager and player.

A forward, played for AEL Limassol from 1977 to 1993, where he celebrated three Cypriot Cups.

As a manager, Orphanides started as an assistant to Andreas Michaelides in AEL Limassol. He then took AEP Paphos and helped the team to earn promotion to the Cypriot First Division in 2002. He took over at Nea Salalmia. In 2003–04, the team easily won the Cypriot Second Division and returned to the major league. In 2004–05, Nea Salamina reached the sixth place of the League.

Orphanides also managed his former team AEL in the 2006–07 season, and again Nea Salamina. On 28 September 2009 he announced his retirement from his managerial career.

== Playing career ==
- 1977–1993 AEL Limassol

== Managerial career ==
- 2000–2001 AEL Limassol (assistant manager)
- 2001–2002 AEP Paphos
- 2003–2005 Nea Salamina
- 2006–2007 AEL Limassol
- 2007–2008 Nea Salamina
- 2009–2010 Ethnikos Achna
  - On 28 September 2009 he announced his retirement from his managerial career.

== Honours ==
=== As a player ===
AEL Limassol

- Cypriot Cup: 1985, 1987, 1989
- Cypriot Super Cup: 1985

=== As a manager ===
Nea Salamina

- Cypriot Second Division: 2004

AEP Paphos

- Cypriot Second Division third place: 2002
