= Vesko Mihajlović =

Serbian footballer and manager

Personal information
- Date of birth: 17 March 1968 (age 58)
- Place of birth: Kraljevo, SFR Yugoslavia
- Positions: Midfielder; forward

Team information
- Current team: Ethnikos Achna (manager)

Youth career
- 1984–1988: Sloga Kraljevo

Senior career*
Years	Team	Apps	(Gls)
1984–1988	Sloga Kraljevo		
1989–1991	Proleter Zrenjanin	66	(18)
1991–1993	Vojvodina	55	(28)
1993–1994	APOEL	24	(10)
1994-1995	Enosis Neon Paralimni	32	(13)
1995-1996	Olympiakos Nicosia	24	(11)
1996–1999	Anorthosis	64	(48)
1999–2005	Omonia	124	(33)
Total		389	(161)

International career
- Yugoslavia U18

Managerial career
- 2004–2005: Omonia (player-manager)
- 2014: Alki Larnaca (caretaker)
- 2016–2018: ASIL Lysi
- 2018: Olympiakos Nicosia
- 2019: Othellos Athienou (caretaker)
- 2023: Anorthosis (caretaker)
- 2025: Anorthosis (caretaker)
- 2025: Achyronas-Onisilos
- 2026–: Ethnikos Achna
- * Club domestic league appearances and goals

Vesko Mihajlović (Serbian Cyrillic: Веско Михајловић; born 17 March 1968) is a Serbian football manager of Ethnikos Achna and former player. He is widely considered to be one of the best foreign players to have played in the Cypriot Championship. He became a Cypriot citizen in 2002.

== Career ==
During his playing career he represented FK Sloga Kraljevo, FK Proleter Zrenjanin, FK Vojvodina in Serbia and APOEL, Enosis Neon Paralimni, Olympiakos Nicosia, Anorthosis and Omonia in Cyprus.

Mihajlović scored three goals in 18 Yugoslav Second League matches for Proleter during the 1989–90 season, and led the team in scoring with ten goals in 31 Yugoslav First League matches during the 1990–91 season.

He was an excellent attacking midfielder and skilled at free kicks. During his tenure with Omonia he struck a partnership with Rainer Rauffmann. Together they led Omonia to 2 championship titles and 1 cup win. He had previously won 2 championship titles and a cup with Anorthosis.

During his final season with Omonia (2004–2005) he was put in charge as player-manager for the club. However, after a few months he decided to step down and return to his former role with Henk Houwaart replaced him.

His final match was at the 2004–2005 Cypriot Cup final in which Omonia defeated Digenis Morphou 2–0. As a gesture of appreciation for his services to the club he was brought on as a substitute and also lifted the trophy with Costas Kaiafas. He was 37 years old at the time.

He was director of football for AC Omonia for three years before moving on to the same role for Alki Larnaca. On 8 April 2016 he was announced as new manager of ASIL Lysi. In March 2018 he took over as manager of Olympiakos Nicosia.

== Honours ==
- First League of FR Yugoslavia top scorer: 1992–93
- Cypriot Championship: 1998, 1999, 2001, 2003
- Cypriot Cup: 1998, 2000, 2005
- Cyprus FA Shield: 1998, 2001, 2003
