= Demetris Ioannou =

Cypriot footballer (born 1968)

Personal information
- Full name: Demetris Ioannou
- Date of birth: 8 December 1968 (age 57)
- Place of birth: Limassol, Cyprus
- Position: Defender

Senior career*
Years	Team	Apps	(Gls)
1990–1995	Apollon	128	(21)
1995–2001	Anorthosis Famagusta	120	(15)
2001	Olympiakos Nicosia	14	(1)
2001–2003	AEP Paphos	31	(3)
Total		293	(40)

International career^{‡}
1991–2000	Cyprus	48	(2)

Managerial career
- 2010: Ermis Aradippou (assistant manager)
- 2010: Ermis Aradippou (caretaker manager)
- 2011–2012: AEK Kouklia F.C.
- 2012–2013: Aris Limassol F.C.
- 2013–2014: AEK Kouklia F.C.
- 2014: Doxa Katokopias F.C.
- 2016–2017: Pafos
- 2023: Geroskipou
- 2024–: Peyia 2014
- * Club domestic league appearances and goals as of 17 April 2008 ‡ National team caps and goals as of 17 April 2008

Demetris Ioannou (Greek: Δημήτρης Ιωάννου), born 8 December 1968, is a former international Cypriot football defender and currently a football manager.

== Career ==
He started his career in 1990 from Apollon Limassol and then followed six successful seasons in Anorthosis Famagusta. Also, he played in Olympiakos Nicosia for just six months and he ended his career in AEP Paphos.

== International career ==
He captained the Cyprus national team for a four-year period.

== Personal life ==
His son, Nicholas Ioannou, was born on 10 November 1995. He plays as a centre defender, and was signed up by Manchester United when he was 11 years old. He progressed through the ranks at Old Trafford and he was a member of the inaugural UEFA Youth League squad. On 24 April 2014 he signed a three-year contract with the football club of APOEL Nicosia.
