= Nikodimos Papavasiliou =

Cypriot football manager (born 1970)

Nikki Papavasiliou Νικόδημος Παπαβασιλείου
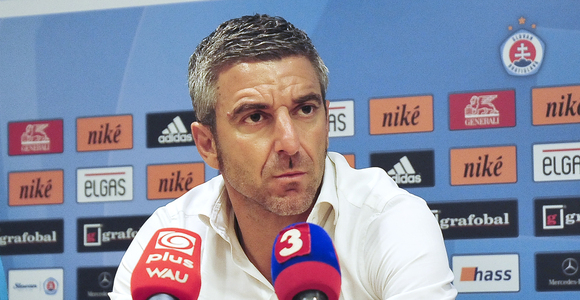
- Papavasiliou in 2015

Personal information
- Full name: Nikodemus Papavasiliou
- Date of birth: 31 August 1970 (age 56)
- Place of birth: Limassol, Cyprus
- Height: 1.73 m (5 ft 8 in)
- Position: Midfielder

Team information
- Current team: Dynamo České Budějovice (manager)

Youth career
- Apollon Limassol
- Arsenal
- –1987: Oldham Athletic

Senior career*
Years	Team	Apps	(Gls)
1988–1993	OFI	75	(2)
1993–1994	Newcastle United	7	(0)
1994–1995	OFI	12	(0)
1996–2000	Apollon Limassol	74	(24)
2000–2002	Anorthosis Famagusta	16	(2)
2001–2002	→ Enosis Neon Paralimni (loan)	11	(2)
2002	→ Olympiakos Nicosia (loan)	0	(0)
2002–2003	APOEL	14	(0)

International career
	Cyprus U16	8	(2)
	Cyprus U21	28	(8)
1990–1999	Cyprus	38	(7)

Managerial career
- 2006–2007: APEP Pitsilia
- 2008–2009: Olympiakos Nicosia
- 2009–2009: OFI
- 2009–2010: Olympiakos Nicosia
- 2010–2011: Doxa Katokopia
- 2011–2012: Enosis Neon Paralimni
- 2012–2012: Olympiakos Nicosia
- 2012–2013: Apollon Limassol
- 2014–2015: Ermis Aradippou
- 2015–2016: Slovan Bratislava
- 2018–2019: Ergotelis
- 2019–2020: Panionios
- 2020–2021: Wadi Degla
- 2021–2022: Nea Salamis Famagusta
- 2022–2023: Ghazl El Mahalla
- 2023–2024: National Bank of Egypt
- 2024–2025: Al Ittihad
- 2025: Ghazl El Mahalla
- 2026–: Dynamo České Budějovice
- * Club domestic league appearances and goals

Nikodimos "Nikki" Papavasiliou (Greek: Νικόδημος Παπαβασιλείου; born 31 August 1970) is a Cypriot football manager and former international midfielder. Aside from playing and managing, Papavasiliou's background includes scouting and Academy management. He was the first Greek Cypriot to play in the FA Premier League.

== Playing career ==
=== Club career ===
Papavasiliou began his pro football career in 1988 with Greek Alpha Ethniki club OFI, having arrived from England nd the youth teams of Oldham Athletic and Arsenal. He spent five years with the Cretan top-tier side during its "golden years", establishing himself as an attacking midfielder under coach Eugène Gerards. In August 1993, Papavasiliou was transferred to Newcastle United for a £120,000 fee, signing a two-year contract and thus becoming the first Cypriot to play in the FA Premier League. He made his Newcastle debut against Tottenham on 14 August 1993. He went on to play for two seasons at the club before returning to OFI in 1994.

He returned to Cyprus in 1996 signing for First Division club Apollon Limassol, where he stayed four years. In 2000, Papavasiliou was acquired by Anorthosis Famagusta, but after playing with them through the 2000–01 season, he was subsequently loaned out to Enosis Neon Paralimni and Olympiakos Nicosia. He then moved to APOEL, where he played his final season, opting to retire his playing career in 2003.

=== International career ===
Papavasiliou has represented Cyprus for 9 years during 1990–1999, making a total of 38 national caps and scoring five goals.

== Managerial career ==
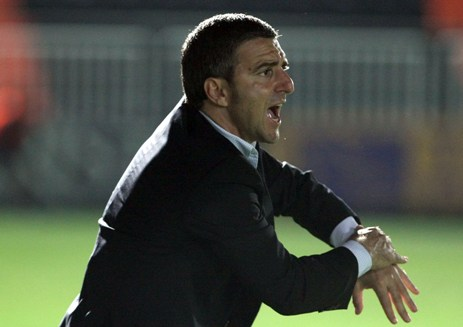
Papavasiliou in 2010.

Papavasiliou holds the English UEFA A Licence and also the UEFA Pro Licence. He began his managerial career in Cyprus, first at APE Pitsilia in the 2006–07 Cypriot Second Division and then moving to Olympiakos Nicosia, who had recently been relegated to the Second Division after many decades in the top flight. Papavasiliou led the Green−Blacks throughout their 2007–08 campaign, but missed out on promotion in the final match of the competition, in which his side was defeated 2–1 by fellow promotion contenders Nea Salamis, who thus finished in the promotion zone and left Olympiakos in fourth place.

In the summer of 2009, Papavasiliou returned to Greece and the team where he made his name as a player, OFI, where he was paired up with former OFI teammate Myron Sifakis to lead the club during its 2009–10 Beta Ethniki campaign. He returned to Cyprus and Olympiakos Nicosia, this time completing the club's comeback to the First Division after securing third place in the 2009–10 campaign. He left the club in the summer of 2010 and spent the next six months managing Doxa Katokopia until January 2011, and then one year at Enosis Neon Paralimni, whom he led to an all-time best fifth-place finish in the First Division in 2011. In February 2012, Papavasiliou was hired as manager of Olympiakos Nicosia for the third time in his managerial career.

In September 2012, Papavasiliou reached an agreement with Apollon Limassol, for whom he had played from 1996 to 2000, and mutually terminated his contract with Olympiakos to complete the move. He did not manage to finish the season with the club, as he was sacked in March 2013, after a 9–6–6 record. In September 2014, he was appointed manager of Ermis Aradippou, after secured a presticious top 6.

On 21 August 2015 Papavasiliou was hired as manager of Slovak First Football League side Slovan Bratislava, whom he led to the 2016 Slovak Cup Final. He finished the season in second place behind double-winners AS Trenčín, boasting an impressive .64 win ratio. His second season with the club came to an abrupt end however, as he was fired after the third game of the 2016–17 season

In May 2018, Papavasiliou was appointed manager of Greek Football League side Ergotelis. He managed to lead the club to its first Greek Cup Quarter-finals since 1986 during his first season as club manager. His work did not go unnoticed and in September 2019 he was offered the head coach position of struggling Super League side Panionios. Papavasiliou thus terminated his contract with Ergotelis, accepting the bid and thus making his Super League managerial debut.

On 30 March 2026, Papavasiliou was appointed manager of Czech National Football League club Dynamo České Budějovice.

== Managerial statistics ==
As of match played 8 January 2023

Managerial record by team and tenure
Team	From	To	Record					Ref.
Team	From	To	P	W	D	L	Win %	Ref.
APEP Pitsilia	1 July 2006	30 June 2007	30	11	5	14	36.7	
Olympiakos	1 July 2008	30 June 2009	28	14	6	8	50.0	
OFI	1 July 2009	2 November 2009	9	3	2	4	33.3	
Olympiakos	3 November 2009	30 June 2010	19	8	7	4	42.1	
Doxa Katokopia	1 July 2010	13 January 2011	19	5	5	9	26.3	
Enosis Neon Paralimni	18 January 2011	9 January 2012	28	10	6	12	35.7	
Olympiakos	28 February 2012	20 September 2012	14	6	3	5	42.9	
Apollon Limassol	21 September 2012	5 March 2013	23	11	6	6	47.8	
Ermis Aradippou	8 September 2014	2 February 2015	18	9	3	6	50.0	
Slovan Bratislava	23 August 2015	1 August 2016	45	23	15	7	51.1	
Ergotelis	1 July 2018	1 September 2019	38	18	8	12	47.4	
Panionios	3 September 2019	20 February 2020	26	6	6	14	23.1	
Wadi Degla	21 February 2020	21 January 2021	25	6	9	10	24.0	
Nea Salamis Famagusta	9 July 2021	31 January 2022	1	0	0	1	0.0	
Ghazl El Mahalla	13 September 2022	8 January 2023	12	5	3	4	41.7	
Total			335	135	84	116	40.3	—

== Other ==
Papavasiliou has accumulated substantial experience and expertise in scouting, and Academy management, having worked as a scout for FA Premier League clubs Bolton Wanderers and Newcastle United. He is also the owner of Nikki Football Academy in Cyprus.
