= Savvas Constantinou =

Cypriot footballer (born 1971)

Personal information
- Full name: Savvas Constantinou
- Date of birth: August 28, 1971 (age 55)
- Place of birth: Nicosia, Cyprus
- Height: 1.85 m (6 ft 1 in)
- Position: Goalkeeper

Senior career*
Years	Team	Apps	(Gls)
1993–1994	Pezoporikos	19	(0)
1994–2002	AEK Larnaca	117	(0)
2002–2006	Digenis Morphou	85	(0)
	Total	221	(0 )

International career
2000–2001	Cyprus	4	(0)

Managerial career
- 2005–2007: Digenis Morphou
- 2007–2008: AEP Paphos
- 2008: Nea Salamina
- 2009: AEK Larnaca
- * Club domestic league appearances and goals

Savvas Constantinou (born August 28, 1971) is a former international Cypriot football goalkeeper. In November 2008 he moved to Nea Salamina replacing Panikos Orphanides. In January 2009, after some arguments with the board of directors of Nea Salamina, he was sacked and on January 15 he went to AEK Larnaca.

He started his career from Pezoporikos and then played in AEK Larnaca for eight years. He then moved to Digenis Morphou where he played for four seasons and finished his career.
