= Adul Baldé =

Bissau-Guinean footballer

Adul
Personal information
- Full name: Adul Baldé
- Date of birth: April 9, 1989 (age 37)
- Place of birth: Bissau, Guinea Bissau
- Height: 1.75 m (5 ft 9 in)
- Position: Striker

Youth career
- 2005–2007: C.F. Estrela da Amadora

Senior career*
Years	Team	Apps	(Gls)
2007–2008	C.F. Estrela da Amadora	3	(0)
2009	Clube Oriental de Lisboa	17	(3)
2009	Vitória Setúbal	3	(0)
2010	S.C. Covilhã	2	(0)
2010–2011	C.D. Pinhalnovense	19	(2)
2011–2012	Doxa Katokopias	28	(9)
2013–2014	Kayl-Tétange	5	(0)

International career
2012	Guinea-Bissau	1	(0)
- * Club domestic league appearances and goals as of May 2012

Adul Baldé or simply Adul (born April 9, 1989) is a Bissau-Guinean footballer.
