= Nikolas Nicolaou =

Cypriot footballer (born 1979)

Personal information
- Full name: Nikolas Nicolaou
- Date of birth: May 10, 1979 (age 47)
- Place of birth: Nicosia, Cyprus
- Height: 1.83 m (6 ft 0 in)
- Positions: Right-back; centre back

Team information
- Current team: (Manager)

Senior career*
Years	Team	Apps	(Gls)
1998–1999	Alki Larnaca	11	(0)
1999–2002	Doxa Katokopias	40	(2)
2002–2008	Olympiakos Nicosia	91	(1)
2003–2004	→Digenis Morphou (loan)	9	(0)
2008–2010	Doxa Katokopias	42	(0)
2010–2016	Olympiakos Nicosia	103	(1)

Managerial career
- 2014–2015: Olympiakos Nicosia (assistant manager)
- 2024-2024: Olympiakos Nicosia (Manager)
- * Club domestic league appearances and goals as of June 1, 2024

Nikolas Nicolaou (Greek: Νικόλας Νικολάου; born May 10, 1979, in Nicosia) is a retired Cypriot football defender, who played for Olympiakos Nicosia. He was the captain of Olympiakos Nicosia and also assistant manager of the club in 2014. He took over as coach of the U21 team in the 2016–2017 season when he retired from the first team. On 24 July 2016 he also took over as caretaker manager of the first team of Olympiakos Nicosia until 12 August 2016, following the mutually agreed termination with Chrysis Michael. In May 2024 he took over as the manager of Olympiakos Nicosia signing a one a one plus one-year contract, with the target to return the club to the top Division.

For the year 2013–2014, he was voted as one of the best defenders in the Cypriot Second Division B1.
