= Saša Jovanović (footballer, born 1974) =

Serbian footballer and manager

Personal information
- Full name: Saša Jovanović
- Date of birth: 18 June 1974 (age 52)
- Place of birth: Leskovac, SFR Yugoslavia
- Height: 1.80 m (5 ft 11 in)
- Position: Forward

Youth career
- Dubočica

Senior career*
Years	Team	Apps	(Gls)
1995–1996	Radnički Niš	30	(8)
1996–1997	Anorthosis	18	(3)
1997–1998	APOP Paphos	25	(12)
1998–1999	AEL Limassol	6	(3)
1999–2000	Trikala	22	(11)
2000–2002	Panionios	29	(7)
2002–2005	AEP Paphos	81	(50)
2005–2006	APOEL	21	(3)
2006–2007	AEL Limassol	21	(7)
2007–2009	AEP Paphos	30	(12)
2009	Akritas Chlorakas		

Managerial career
- 2009: Akritas Chlorakas
- 2009–2010: Olympiakos Nicosia
- 2010: AEP Paphos
- 2011–2012: Atromitos Yeroskipou
- 2012–2013: AEP Paphos
- 2013: EN Paralimni
- 2013–2014: APEP
- 2014–2015: ENAD Polis Chrysochous
- 2016–2018: Peyia 2014
- 2019-: Cyprus U19
- * Club domestic league appearances and goals

Saša Jovanović (Serbian Cyrillic: Саша Јовановић; born 18 June 1974) is a Serbian football manager and former striker. Jovanović also has Cypriot citizenship.

As a player, he played for FK Radnički Niš, Anorthosis, APOP Paphos, AEL Limassol, Trikala, Panionios, AEP Paphos and APOEL.
