= AEP Paphos FC =

A.E. Paphos Α.Ε. Πάφος
- Full name: Athletiki Enosi Paphos; Greek: Αθλητική Ένωση Πάφος; Athletic Union Paphos
- Nickname(s): Πάφος
- Founded: 2000; 25 years ago
- Dissolved: 9 June 2014; 11 years ago
- Ground: Pafiako Stadium, Pafos, Cyprus
- Capacity: 9,394
- League: Cypriot Second Division
- 2012–13: 14th (Relegated)
Home colours	Away colours

AEP Paphos (Greek: Αθλητική Ένωση Πάφος, Athlitiki Enosi Pafos; "Athletic Union Paphos") was a Cypriot football club based in Paphos. The club was formed in 2000 after the merger of the two clubs of Paphos, APOP and Evagoras. AEP Paphos was dissolved on 9 June 2014, in order to be merged with AEK Kouklia and create a new team, Pafos FC.

== History ==
APOP and Evagoras were the two clubs of Paphos playing sometimes in First and sometimes in the Second Division. In contrast with the other Districts of Cyprus and other major towns, which had permanent teams in First Division, Paphos did not have such a team as the two clubs could not remain in First Division for many years. For this reason the two clubs were merged to form AEP Paphos as the people of Paphos wanted a permanent team in First Division.

When the two clubs joined to form AEP, APOP was in First Division, and managed to remain there, and Evagoras was in the Second division without managing to achieve promotion. Since APOP was in the First Division, the newly formed club of Paphos began its history from the First. They club remained in the first division until 2005, but soon had the luck of APOP and Evagoras when the team was for first time relegated to the Second Division. However, despite the fact that the team for the season 2005/06 was playing in the Second Division, in April 2006 they had their greatest success as a club since the team qualified for first time for the semi-finals of Cypriot Cup (APOP reached the semi-finals twice) by eliminating Olympiakos Nicosia. In the semi-finals of the Cup they faced AEK Larnaca and despite the fact that Paphos was not beaten in none of the matches against AEK, they were eliminated with scores 1–1 at home and 0–0 away. The same season, AEP won the Second Division Championship and was promoted back to First division but after a very bad season were again relegated. The club had not justified the dreams of the people of Paphos of having a better team than APOP and Evagoras and to have a worthy team which will be permanent in the First Division.

On 9 June 2014, AEP Paphos was merged with AEK Kouklia and created a new team, Pafos FC.

== Colours, badge and name ==
APOP's original logo prior to merger

Evagoras' original logo prior to merger

The colours of the team were blue and white. These colours were chosen because they were both APOP and Evagoras' colours. The club's badge was a blue shield with some white lines and in the middle was the figure of Evagoras Pallikarides's as a face in a circle. Evagoras Pallikarides was a poet from Paphos who was hanged by the British authorities, as he was an EOKA guerrilla, fighting for the independence of Cyprus. From his name came the name, Evagoras FC, one of the two football clubs which were merged for AEP to be established. For this reason it was used in AEP's badge inside the blue badge with the white lines which was APOP's badge. APOP's name meant Athletic Football Club of Paphos (Athlitikos Podosferikos Omilos Pafou; Αθλητικός Ποδοσφαιρικός Όμιλος Πάφου).

== Stadium ==
The home ground of AEP Paphos, was the Pafiako Stadium, a multi-use stadium in Paphos. The capacity was 8000 seated spectators but in 2003 the ground was updated and expanded. It can now hold 11,000 fans. The Pafiako served as the home ground for APOP and Evagoras, and was also used by APOP Kinyras Peyias FC, whilst competing in the First Division during the 2005–06 season. GSK (Gymnastic Club Korivos) stadium was the home of APOP and Evagoras before the Pafiako was built.

== Historical list of coaches ==
- (Cyprus) Panicos Orphanides (1 July 2001 – 30 June 2002)
- (Serbia and Montenegro) Radmilo Ivančević (2002 – 2003)
- (Cyprus) Andreas Michaelides (2003 – December 2004)
- (Serbia and Montenegro) Miodrag Božović (December 2004 – 16 January 2005)
- (Cyprus) Nicos Andronicou (16 January 2005 – 26 September 2006)
- (Cyprus) Tasos Makris (26 September 2006 – 8 October 2006)
- (Cyprus) Milenko Spoljaric (9 October 2006 – 1 November 2006)
- (Cyprus) Filippos Hadjiloukas (2 November 2006 – 30 June 2007)
- (Cyprus) Savvas Constantinou (1 July 2007 – 3 November 2008)
- (Israel) Nir Klinger (5 November 2008 – 31 May 2009)
- (Israel) Eyal Lahman (9 June 2009 – 6 September 2009)
- (Cyprus) Tasos Kyriakou (8 September 2009 –1 February 2010)
- (Greece) Savvas Kofidis (3 February 2010 – 28 March 2010)
- (Cyprus) Demetris Ioannou (29 March 2010 – 30 Jun 2010)
- (Bulgaria) Angel Slavkov (1 July 2010 – 6 December 2010)
- (Cyprus) Giorgos Polyviou (7 Dec 2010–30 June 2012)
- (Greece) Ioannis Topalidis (1 July 2012 – 55 November 2012)
- (Portugal) Horácio Gonçalves (Nov 2012)
- (Serbia) Saša Jovanović (26 November 2012 – 31 May 2013)
- (Cyprus) John Yiangoudakis (1 June 2013 – 1 October 2013)
- (Cyprus) Andreas Polydorou (1 October 2013 – 9 June 2014)

== Titles ==
- Cypriot Second Division
  - Winners (2): 2006, 2008

Before 2006, since APOP and Evagoras played in Second Division for several years, they had won it 6 times each; APOP were winners in 1966, 1971, 1973, 1975, 1977, 1996 and Evagoras in 1968, 1972, 1981, 1989, 1991, 1995
