= Andreas Michaelides =

Cypriot politician and former footballer and manager

Personal information
- Full name: Andreas Michaelidis
- Date of birth: 29 December 1952 (age 73)
- Place of birth: Limassol, British Cyprus
- Position: Midfielder

Senior career*
Years	Team	Apps	(Gls)
1967–1972	Aris Limassol		
1978–1979	A.E.Maroniou (loan)		

Managerial career
- 1979–1983: K.N.Maroniou
- 1983–1985: Apollon Limassol (assistant)
- 1986: Cyprus U-21
- 1986–1991: Aris Limassol
- 1991–1996: Cyprus
- 1997–1999: Omonia
- 1999–2000: APOEL
- 2000–2002: AEL Limassol
- 2002–2003: Anorthosis
- 2003–2004: AEP Paphos
- 2004–2005: AEL Limassol
- 2005–2006: Nea Salamina
- 2006–2007: Aris Limassol
- 2007–2009: AEL Limassol
- 2009–2010: AEK Larnaca
- 2010–2011: Apollon Limassol
- * Club domestic league appearances and goals

Andreas Michaelides (Greek: Ανδρέας Μιχαηλίδης; born in Limassol on 28 December 1952) is a Cypriot football manager, the president of Cypriot Managers Federation, and member of the House of Representatives of Cyprus. He started his coaching career at 1979, and during the season 2010–11, after he was appointed Apollon Limassol manager, he made a domestic record, becoming the first manager in charge of all major teams in Cyprus.

== Approach and philosophy ==
Michaelides has been described as a coach who gives emphasis on player psychology. Furthermore, has a strong reputation of getting the best out of players with technical abilities. A notable example was during the 1990s, when Michaelides guided Costas Malekkos to his best footballing years of his career. Moreover, he is largely acknowledged for the development of Constantinos Charalambidis and Moustapha Bangura.

== Cyprus national football team ==
Michaelides is considered one of the best managers of the Cyprus national football team. He managed the team for five years (1991–1996), having been in charge for 48 matches, making his debut on 16 October 1991 at the match Cyprus-Iceland (1-1).

Cyprus National Team Career
	Matches	Wins	Draws	Loses	Goals
Home games	28	9	9	10	35-39
Away games	20	2	3	15	14-46
Total	48	11	12	25	49-85

== Manager Statistics ==
Team	Season	Record				
Team	Season	Games	Wins	Draws	Losses	Win %
Aris Limassol	1987-88	30	10	6	14	33.33
Aris Limassol	1988-89	28	8	10	10	28.57
Aris Limassol	1989-90	26	11	8	7	42.31
Aris Limassol	1990-91	26	9	6	11	34.62
Cyprus	1991-96	48	11	12	25	22.92
Omonia Nicosia	1996-97	10	6	1	3	60.00
Omonia Nicosia	1997-98	26	19	5	2	73.08
Omonia Nicosia	1998-99	26	21	4	1	80.77
APOEL	1999-00	26	14	4	8	53.85
AEL Limassol	2000-01	26	15	7	4	57.69
AEL Limassol	2001-02	26	17	3	6	65.38
AEL Limassol	2002-03	4	1	1	2	25.00
Anorthosis	2002-03	9	8	0	1	88.89
Anorthosis	2003-04	1	1	0	0	100.00
AEP Paphos	2003-04	18	10	1	7	55.56
AEP Paphos	2004-05	12	5	1	6	41.67
AEL Limassol	2004-05	4	1	1	2	25.00
Nea Salamina	2005-06	19	10	4	5	52.63
Nea Salamina	2006-07	10	2	5	3	20.00
Aris Limassol	2006-07	13	5	3	5	38.46
Aris Limassol	2007-08	2	0	0	2	0.00
AEL Limassol	2007-08	13	6	2	5	46.15
AEL Limassol	2008-09	19	8	3	8	42.11
AEK Larnaca	2009-10	20	10	5	5	50.00
Apollon Limassol	2010-11	25	12	7	6	48.00

As of 24 May 2011

== Politics ==
Michaelides was elected in the House of Representatives of Cyprus on 22 May 2011 for the Cypriot legislative election running under right-wingers DISY party, in Limassol district. He received 9872 votes.

== Honours ==
=== Manager ===
==== Aris Limassol ====
Runner-up

- Cypriot Cup: 1988-89

==== Omonia ====
Runner-up

- Cypriot Cup: 1996-97
- Cypriot First Division: 1997–98
- Cypriot First Division: 1998–99

==== APOEL ====
Runner-up

- Cypriot Cup: 1999-00

==== Anorthosis ====
Winner

- Cypriot Cup: 2002-03

==== Apollon Limassol ====
Runner-up

- Cypriot Cup: 2010-11
