= Olympiakos Nicosia =

Association football club in Cyprus

- Full name: Olympiakos Nicosia Football Club
- Nicknames: Μαυροπράσινοι (The Black-Greens); Taktakalas (area in old Nicosia where club is based)
- Founded: 1 June 1931; 95 years ago
- Ground: GSP Stadium
- Capacity: 23,000
- Chairman: Petros Savva
- Manager: Georgios Kostis
- League: First Division
- 2025–26: First Division, 11th of 16
- Website: www.olympiakos.com.cy
Home colours	Away colours

Olympiakos Nicosia (Greek: Ολυμπιακός Λευκωσίας, Olympiakos Lefkosias) is a Cypriot football club based in Nicosia and competes in the First Division. The club was founded in 1931, and is a founding member of the Cyprus Football Association. The club colors are black and green. Olympiakos' home ground is the new GSP Stadium, which has a 23,000-seat capacity. The team's main nickname is "mavroprasini" (the green-blacks), and the club's other nickname is Taktakalas, derived from the area of Nicosia where the club hails from.

Olympiakos Nicosia has won three Cypriot First Division Championships, one Cypriot Cup and one Cyprus Super Cup.

In the past the club also had track and field, basketball, volleyball, cycling, table tennis, weightlifting and futsal teams. It also in the past had an orchestra, choir and camping divisions; the latter explaining why the club's badge has a tent on it.

== History ==
=== The Golden Decade ===
The 1962–1972 decade is known as the "Golden decade" of Olympiakos as the club was champion of the Cypriot First Division three times, another three times it was runner-up, while it became the only Cyprus football club that participated three times in the Greek Championship.

It all started in the 1961–62 season, when Olympiakos reached the cup final for the first time in the club's history. Despite this, the team did not manage to win the cup trophy, as it lost from Anorthosis Famagusta FC with a score of 5–2.

The foundations had been laid however, in the 1964–65 season, Giorgos Paletsios an old Olympiakos football player for 18 years, who had also served as team captain, agreed to manage the team, without being paid a salary for his services. Paletsios proceeded to restructure the team's squad promoting to the first team young and talented players including: Kettenis, Limbouris, Argyrou. Bolstered with young enthusiasm, the team finished in second place in the championship, while in the same year the top scorer of the championship was Olympiakos player Kostakis Pierides, scoring 21 goals.

In the 1965–66 season Olympiakos was once again runner-up, with 49 points, one point less than the then champion Omonoia. Top scorer of the championship was again an Olympiakos player, Panikos Efthymiades scoring 23 goals.

In the 1966–67 season Olympiakos dominated the Cypriot Championship, with Pambos Avraamidis as their manager, the team finished in first place and won the championship with 55 points as many as APOEL Nicosia, who in the last game of the season beat Aris Limassol with the huge score of 17–1. The title was judged on goal difference and despite APOEL's huge score in the last game of the season, Olympiakos still had a superior goal difference so that the club was crowned champion.

In 1967, the champion Olympiakos played against the Cup-winner Apollon Limassol, winning 1–0 therefore gaining the Pakkos Shield (as the Super Cup/Shield was then known.)

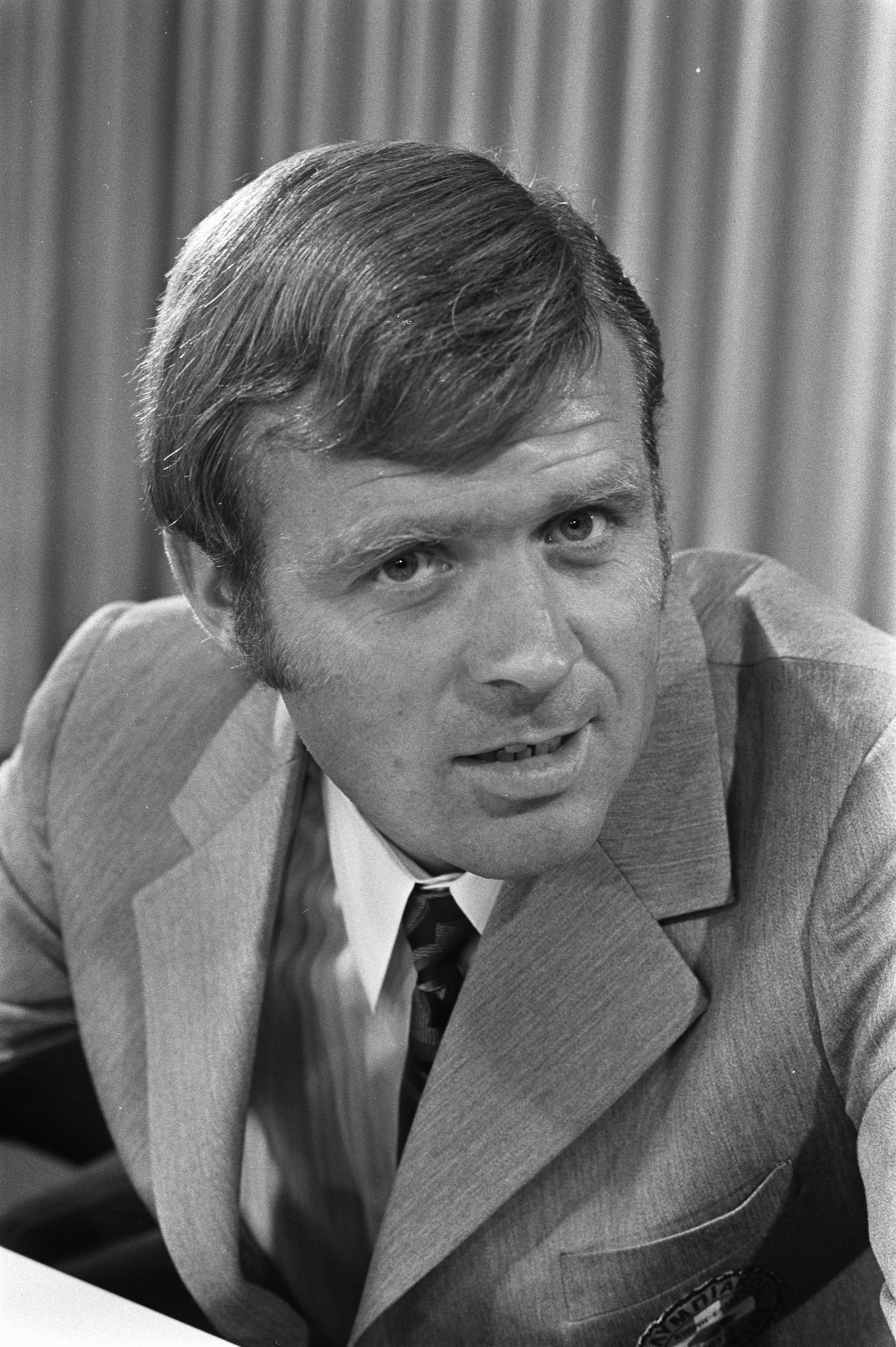
Manager Rod Bradley in 1971

In the 1968–69 season, Olympiakos won the championship for a second time, collecting 52 points the same number as AC Omonoia. Olympiakos was champion however because of the better goal difference. Top scorer of the championship was once again Panikos Efthymiades scoring 17 goals.

The third Olympiakos championship came in the 1970–71 season with Englishman Rod Bradley as the manager, the team finished in first place with 31 points compared to 27 of runner up Digenis Morfou. The title of top scorer was shared by 3 footballers who all scored 11 goals amongst them once again Panikos Efthymiades.

In the 1972–73 season Olympiakos finished runner-up, while in the 1974–75 season the team finished third.

In 1971 Olympiakos won the Paligenesias cup that was organised by the Cyprus Football Association(KOP), defeating Nea Salamis Famagusta FC. In this golden period, Olympiakos' managers were: Pambos Avraamidis, Giorgos Paletsios, Takis Papaxeniou, Eric Brookes and Rod Bradley.

Andreas Filotas, Varnavas Christofi, Nikos Theocharidis, Demos Flourentzou, Giorgos Hadjikonstantis, Dimitrakis Argyrou, Yiannis Xipolitas, Savvakis Constantinou, Michalakis Argyrou, Sotirakis Georgiou, Lakis Avraamidis, Markos Markou, Andreas Nicolaou (Lympoyris), Vasilis Fragkiskou (Katsis), Dimitriadis, Tasos Louka, Andreas Assiotis, Giorgos Kettenis, Panikos Efthymiades, Kostakis Pierides, Charalambos Partasidis, Giannos Pavlou, Takis Papettas, Kokos Michael, Nikos Mailos, Michalis Stavrou, Giorgos Aristeidou, Koullis Iliadis, Lakis Mitsidis, Panagiotis Prodromou, Giannis Serafeim were the footballers of the great successes of this period.

=== Greek Experience ===
Olympiakos became the first Cypriot football team that participated in the Pan-Hellenic Championship, in the 1967–68 season, something which recurred twice more, in 1969–70, and in 1971–72, rendering the club the only Cypriot team that participated three times in the Greek Championship. Olympiakos has also taken part in all three European competitions.

=== European Experience ===
In the European Cup in 1967 the club faced FK Sarajevo Yugoslavia. In the first game the teams drew 2–2, while in second game Olympiakos lost with 3–1.

Also in the European Cup, Olympiakos Nicosia played against Real Madrid in 1969, losing both matches with 8–0 and 6–1. Olympiakos later played in the same competition in 1971 and met Feyenoord of the Netherlands and lost 8–0 and 9–0.

In the Cup Winners' Cup, Olympiakos took part once in 1977 playing against Universitatea Craiova Romania while in 1973 Olympiakos played against the German team VfB Stuttgart for the UEFA Cup.

In all these European games Olympiakos was forced to play both games away from home as at the time the Cypriot football stadia did not meet the European regulations.

=== Cup glory ===
In 1977, Olympiakos Nicosia beat Alki Larnaca 2–0 to win the Cypriot Cup after two thunder bolts from local center half, captain and talisman George Aristidou. In 1991, Olympiakos Nicosia lost the Cypriot Cup in the finals losing 1–0 to AC Omonia. That was their last appearance in the Cypriot Cup finals.

=== Glory days revisited ===
Olympiakos Nicosia also played in the UEFA Cup (after finishing runner up in the Cypriot championship) in the 2001–02 season against the Hungarian team Dunaferr FC (drawing 2–2 in Nicosia and scoring a 2–4 away win, the first for the club in Europe) and proceeded to the next round of the Uefa Cup to play against Club Brugge of Belgium and was eventually eliminated.

=== Decline ===
With Olympiakos TV rights hastily agreed at the lowest amount for any Cypriot first division club in 2007 for 9 seasons and these rights assigned to repay old debts until 2016 the club had little cash inflow apart from gate receipts and commercial sponsorships. After a disastrous 2007–2008 season, where economic problems hindered the building of a strong squad, Olympiakos Nicosia finished bottom of the Cypriot First Division (the first time the club finished bottom). The club was relegated for the third time in its history. In both the 1983–84 and 1997–98 seasons the club had spent just one season in the second tier of Cypriot football, only to win the Cypriot Second Division title each time and return to the Cypriot First Division.

The club tried to re-organise itself and to return to the top flight as quickly as possible. In the 2008–09 season the club finished fourth and missed the promotion to the Cypriot First Division on the last day of the season by one point.

In the 2009–10 season, an old goalkeeper of Olympiakos Petros Savva, was appointed as the new chairman. Savva initially re-appointed Andros Kouloumbris, an old midfield player of Olympiakos, as manager. After the end of the first round, however, Kouloumbris was sacked due to the bad defensive record of the team, despite the team being in 3rd place.

The next coach for 7 games was Saša Jovanović who only managed two wins, with the team languishing in 5th place after some bad appearances, Saša Jovanović was removed to make way for old Olympiakos midfield player and ex-manager Nikodimos Papavasiliou.

With Papavasiliou at the helm the team improved and entered the play-offs for promotion to the Cypriot First Division after finishing third at the end of the regular season. The club finished third at the end of the play-offs and therefore gained promotion, despite helping the team with winning promotion Nikodimos Papavasiliou's contract was not renewed at the end of the season.

=== Return to the top flight ===
After 2 seasons Olympiakos returned to the top flight in the 2010–2011 season and Pambos Christodoulou an old Olympiakos midfield player and ex-manager of Doxa Katokopias was appointed as manager. Olympiakos showed good attacking football in the 2010–2011 season, easily avoiding relegation and having qualified for the Cup quarterfinals. The club played fluid attacking football having the third best attacking record after leaders APOEL and 3rd placed Anorthosis, playing with a 4–4–2 formation with pressing from within the opponent's half, but the Achilles heel of the team was the bad defensive record with goals conceded in most games and the third worst record in this area. Christodoulou decided to leave the club in 2011 to join AEL Limassol, one year before his contract expired. The club decided to pursue this breach in court (in an out of court settlement AEL Limassol paid an undisclosed sum of money to Olympiakos to avoid sanctions against them and Pambos) and Christodoulou angered both the club president and the supporters, as well as the Cypriot football fans in general, with his unprofessional conduct.

=== Striving for Stability ===
In the 2011–2012 season there were a few changes in Olympiakos, the new Greek manager was ex Xanthi FC Nikos Papadopoulos who mainly brought in defensive players playing in the Greek league to strengthen this area of weakness. Few additions were made to the attacking mechanism of the team and some early warnings in the pre season friendlies indicated that after the departure of the previous season's top scorer, the team would be less productive in scoring than last season, which was in fact the case. Papadopoulos was released by mutual consent at the end of February 2012 with the club in the cup quarterfinals but fourth from bottom in the league, although defensively the club was marginally better it lost its attacking flair and pressing style with majority ball possession and suffered from conceding goals right after scoring.

Nikodimos Papavasiliou was again appointed as manager for 2012, after lowering his wage by mutual consent with chairman Savva. It was announced that the budget would be reduced from the previous season and to achieve this only a few players from the previous season's squad remained. The team started the season with a 3-point deduction after failing to meet the UEFA Financial fair play criteria. Papavasiliou received an offer from Apollon Limassol after 2 games in charge of Olympiakos and was released from his contract by mutual consent.

Renos Demetriades an old Olympiakos Nicosia defensive player was appointed as the new coach. Olympiakos was close to mid-table with Demetriades and despite the loss of key players in the January transfer window was on track to keep its top level status, until an unexpected home loss which plunged the club in a battle for survival forced the club to replace Demetriades with Marios Constantinou.

=== Economic Decline ===
The club was relegated, for a fourth time in its history, on the last day of the 2012–2013 season, finishing third from bottom, while being level on points, but was demoted due to the inferior head-to-head record with Nea Salamis Famagusta FC.

The club started the new 2013–2014 season with a 6-point deduction after failing to meet the UEFA Financial fair play criteria. Chairman Petros Savva resigned and Manager Marios Constantinou left making way for old Olympiakos Nicosia defensive midfielder Costas Seraphim. Old chairman Demos Georgiades stepped in as acting chairman and the club used the Makario stadium as the home ground. Seraphim who was offering his services for free, totally reorganised the club for the new season. From the senior players only captain, defender Nikolas Nicolaou and midfielder, vice-captain Kyriacos Polycarpou remained. All the foreign players left. The young Olympiakos players such as forward Giannis Mavrou and goalkeeper Constantinos Panagi stepped up to fill in the places in the starting line up. Together with other local players all under 21 years old as well as 3 under 21 foreign players, the club was trying to reorganize and return to the top flight as soon as possible.

After 4 games with 3 wins the club managed to erase the 6-point deduction and register a positive point tally. Had the penalty not been imposed the club would have been top of the league. After the positive start to the season, the young players were unable to take the pressure of the rugged Cypriot Second Division and six consecutive defeats and a further 3-point deduction, meant the resignation of coach Costas Seraphim in December 2013, the replacement was Savvas Paraskeva, an ex Cypriot youth team national coach. The arrival of Paraskeva, did not arrest the club's decline and the club finished 6th. After a further change of rules, with 14 teams playing in the second division, the club was spared the humiliation of third-tier football and played in the second division for the 2014–2015 season. With around 1.6 million Euro of total legacy debt (old players, banks, creditors and the state) however, the future of the club was looking all the more uncertain.

In the 2014–2015 season the club started with a 3-point deduction and was further hit with a 3-point deduction by December and spent a record third consecutive season in the second tier. The new Manager was ex Olympiakos attacking midfielder Goran Petkovski and the new chairman was Marios Mavrikios, an ex press spokesman of the club during the early 2000s. The club was again in survival mode, trying to survive the drop and pay down the old debts, with only 3 foreign players under 21, two senior Cypriot players and all the rest being Cypriot players under 21. The new club board, managed to reduce the debt to 26 old players to around 600,000 Euro and the club survived in the last game of the season by winning in an away game.

In the 2015–2016 season the club yet again started with a 3-point deduction however with the same Manager and chairman as the previous season, the club set as its goal to return to the Cypriot First Division. In order to achieve this, funds to pay down debts to old players and to lift the embargo of signing senior players was the first objective. Old captain, defensive midfielder and manager Costas Seraphim took over as chairman on 27 July, the embargo was lifted on 28 August by reducing debt to old players to 470,000 Euro and the chairman announced the release of manager Goran Petkovski on 29 August and on 1 September hired Chrysis Michael. The club had a good season and was second for most of the season, falling to third with one game remaining. However, they drew in the last game, thus missing the promotion due to an inferior head-to-head record with Anagennisi Dherynia, thus staying in the second tier for a record fourth season.

In the 2016–2017 season, the club set again as its goal to return to the Cypriot First Division. Chrysis Michael remained in his post. The new president was Dr Andreas Aristodemou. The debt to 22 old players was reduced to 420,000 Euro. Greek Giannis Georgaras was hired as Technical Director. On 24 July the contract with Chrysis Michael was terminated by mutual consent and ex-captain Nikolas Nicolaou took over as caretaker manager until 12 August 2016 when Savvas Paraskeva took over the helm. Nicolaou returned to his position of U21 manager. On 3 November 2016 the president resigned and Costas Seraphim retook the helm. He terminated the contract of manager Savvas Paraskeva by mutual consent as well as of the Technical Director and re hired Chrysis Michael as manager on 4 November 2016. In early January to mid March the club was in third place and gained promotion to the first division after four seasons.

In the 2017–2018 season, the club's goal was to avoid relegation. FIFA had imposed an embargo on signing new players over 18, so the club had to compete in the first division with its existing squad until January. The debt to old players was nevertheless reduced to 350,000 euro and the total legacy debt had been reduced to 1.2 million euro. At the end of the first round the club was in 11th place just above the relegation spots, falling to 12th place after 21 games and in the battle to survive relegation. The club finished in 12th place, avoiding direct relegation at the end of the second round and earned the opportunity to avoid relegation in the third round. The debt to old players was reduced to 225,000 euro and the total legacy debt to below 1 million euro. With 7 games remaining and the club in the relegation spot, 9 points off safety, the contract with Chrysis Michael was terminated by mutual consent and Vesko Mihajlović was hired for the last 7 games of the season, with only one win and the club relegated for the fifth time, with 3 games remaining, Vesko Mihajlović resigned and captain Kyriacos Polykarpou took over as caretaker manager, until the end of the season. The debt to old players was reduced to 125,000 euro and the total legacy debt to below 600,000 euro.

In the 2018–2019 season Costas Seraphim remained president and was backed by the old president of the glory days of the early 2000s, Christopher Tornaritis, as head of the football department. Their first move is to hire Costas Malekkos as manager, with a view of returning to the top flight immediately. After two successive defeats in the first two games of the new season, Malekkos was replaced by Fangio Buyse who brought consecutive wins and the club was in first place after 11 games. Four games before the end of the season the club dropped to third place outside the promotion spots and Buyse was replaced by Kyriacos Polycarpou, an old player of the club, as caretaker manager, who lifted the club to second place and promotion. The debt was stabilised.

=== Stability Regained ===
In the 2019–2020 season Seraphim and Tornaritis, with the club returning to the First Division, re- hired Pambos Christodoulou as manager. Pambos renewed the contracts of central defender Nani Soares from Guinea-Bissau, Cypriot defensive midfielder Andreas Pachipis, Portuguese winger Rogerio Silva, defensive midfielder Evgenios Antoniou, Venezuelan forward Jose Romo and Cypriot left back Constantinos Samaras. The latter three were subsequently loaned to other clubs. His first signings were Cypriot right back Paris Psaltis, Cameroonian defensive midfielder Eyong Enoh, central defender Sambinha from Guinea-Bissau, Cypriot defensive midfielder Giorgos Economides, goalkeepers Pavol Bajza from Slovakia and Mario Kirev from Bulgaria, Portuguese left back Kiko, Cameroonian winger Fabrice Kah, Cypriot right back Vangelis Kyriacou, Cypriot winger Panayiotis Zachariou, Venezuelan midfielder Rafael Acosta, Brazilian Forward Azulão and Ghanaian centre back Ousmane Sidibé. The season was abandoned due to the COVID-19 pandemic in Cyprus and Olympiakos achieved the 9th place, securing participation regarding the next season's First Division.

During June 2020, the director of football hired Greek Giannis Petrakis as the new head coach for the new season. The contracts of Guinea-Bissauan central defenders Sambinha and Nani Soares were renewed, as well as Cameroonian winger Fabrice Kah. Cypriot right backs Paris Psaltis and Vangelis Kyriacou stayed at the club. With Cypriot Defender Constantinos Soteriou and star winger Panayiotis Zachariou also staying. The first signings were Cypriot winger Marios Pechlivanis who returned to the club, Greek goalkeeper Christos Karadais, Cameroonian winger Edgar Salli and goalkeeper Neofytos Michael who also returned to his boyhood club. Giannis Petrakis left the club in November, for Apollon Limassol after receiving an offer against the buyout clause in his contract. This angered the Olympiakos Nicosia supporters and Director of Football Tornaritis, who demanded a higher payout to release him. This was achieved via Giannis Petrakis returning pre-paid bonuses. Costas Seraphim the Technical Director took over as caretaker manager for 5 games. Initially after achieving two wins he was made permanent manager, but a draw and two losses forced him to return to his old post. Leonidas Vokolos took over debuting with a draw at home versus Ermis Aradippou . The new manager faced injuries and suspensions in his effort to retain the club in the top six. After being in charge for 8 games scoring only two draws, Leonidas Vokolos was replaced by Cedomir Janevski. Cedomir Janevski led the club to the top 6 championship group gaining 13 points in the playoffs. Moreover, he also led the club to the first cup final in 30 years where Olympiakos lost 2–1 to Anorthosis Famagusta during the extra-time period.

In the 2021–2022 season the director of football hired Giorgos Petrakis the son of Giannis Petrakis as manager. The new signings were Cypriot defender Stefanos Mouhtaris who returned to the club, French defensive midfielder Alois Confais, Cypriot Bulgarian right back Hristian Foti, Swiss goalkeeper Joel Mall, Cypriot second striker Andreas Michael and Liberian striker Peter Wilson. In addition, the club has signed the Spanish defender Eneko Boveda, Senegalese centre back Modou Diagne and Ghanaian defensive midfielder Alhassan Wakaso. Petrakis parted ways with the club in December 2021 for personal reasons wanting to return to Greece. He left the club in 8th place. Striker Vasilios Mantzis also left a few days later, also returning to Greece. Lucas Alcaraz was named manager of the club on, 29 December 2021, bringing with him as assistant manager his compatriot Jesus Canadas Morcillo. The target was to maintain the historic club, in the top 6 of the league and match the cup final achieved last season, with the ultimate aim of European qualification. However, when he took the helm the club was in 8th place 4 points off target and the aims were not easy to achieve. After 8 games in charge and achieving only two draws Lucas Alcaraz parted ways with Olympiakos. The club lost the chance to be in the top 6 championship group and was knocked out of the cup. Kyriakos Polycrapou took over as caretaker manager and immediately improved the club achieving a win and a draw against PAEEK Kyrenias and Ethnikos Achna. He was replaced by Nedim Tutic -an old player of the club- who transformed the club in the attacking area which was lacking that season. Under his guidance the club achieved four wins and two draws from eight games. Tutic's contract was renewed for the new season and he said that he intended to make 5-6 new transfers and that the club would be stronger next season.

=== Bad decisions by management did not help the club ===
Before the start of the 2022–2023 season the Director of Football decided to replace Tutic with Giannis Petrakis. Petrakis rebuilt the squad with 21 players departing and 17 new players arriving at the club. After bad results Petrakis was replaced in October 2022 with Makis Sergides who improved the club's performance and reached the semi-finals of the cup. However, the club remained in the relegation zone and the director of football replaced Sergides with Nedim Tutic. The results did not improve and the club was relegated finishing last. The Director of football and president resigned and only two young players remained at the club.

In the 2023–2024 season a new younger president Andreas Hartziotis took over and immediately re- hired Pambos Christodoulou as manager on a three-year contract and announced that a swift return to the First Division in one season is the club's target. The manager rebuilt the squad with Cypriot and Portuguese players. In January 2024 the president stepped down and Michalis Louca took over with old goalkeeper and president Petros Savva taking over as Director of Football. One game before the end of the season, the club was in fourth place, one below the promotion spot and three points behind the third placed club. The club failed to gain promotion and stayed in this division for next season, despite finishing level on points with the third club, missing out on the promotion on head to head games.

=== Return to its roots ===
In the 2024–2025 season, Petros Petrou the Director of football and vice President Costakis Seraphim, decided to rebuild the squad from nearly scratch, keeping only two Cypriot players: midfielder Filippos Eftychidis and central defender Andreas Frangeskou. The other player staying on, was under 19 years old central defender Angelos Gavriel. On 27 May 2024 old club captain Nikolas Nicolaou was announced by the club as the new manager, signing a one-year contract with an option to extend for another year. Kyriacos Polycrapou, the old team mate, and vice captain of the manager, also stayed on as assistant manager, making the two old teammates and skippers the two men to bring back the glory days to their club. The club’s target was to return to the top flight. The budget however, is less than half of the previous season and the emphasis is on signing Cypriot players and a few Portuguese foreigners, as a special collaboration with an agent was achieved. The debt to old players was €47,000 and the total legacy debt €600,000. At the end of November 2024, with the club in sixth place, the manager was replaced with Georgios Kostis an old player of the club. On 19th February 2025 Costas Seraphim took over as club president. The club was promoted to the first division finishing in second place.

In the 2025-2026 season a low balanced budget was chosen with the objective to remain in the First Division. Quite a few of the previous season’s players stayed on as well as the president and manager stayed on. In March 2026 with the club in 11th place the manager was replaced with Kyriacos Polycarpou, the assistant manager who had Nektarios Alexandrou as his assistant. After a defeat by Akritas Chloraka it was announced that Helder Castro an old player of the club would become manager with Nektarios Alexandrou staying on as his assistant. After the defeat from Ethnikos Achna Nektarios Alexandrou resigned from his post. Marios Christofi became caretaker manager in April with Marios Hristodoulou as his assistant and Castro remaining as part of the management team. The club managed to avoid relegation on the last day of the season.

In the 2026-2027 season an old goalkeeper and president of the club Petros Savva became president. He immediately re-hired Georgios Kostis as the manager and Petros Petrou as Director of football was going to largely re-build the squad.

== Stadium ==
From 2021, the club had been playing their home matches at the new GSP Stadium until late 2022, when the club decided to move back to Makario Stadium due to financial difficulties. The club returned to the new GSP Stadium for the 2025 season.

From the period of 2013–2021, the club has played again at the Makario Stadium, where they also played in 1998–1999 and 2008–2009.

Previously Olympiakos had played at the old GSP Stadium (1934–1998) and the new GSP Stadium (2000–2008) (2009–2013). Both stadiums were also shared with APOEL and Omonia but Olympiakos was the only club playing at the old GSP Stadium between 1978 and 1998 as APOEL and Omonia had both moved to Makario Stadium.

== Supporters ==
Olympiakos supporters since 2004 are organised under the Panhellenic Fans Association "Taktakalas 1931" which takes its name from the area of old Nicosia where the clubhouse and the original training ground and now football academy "Promahonas"(near the old Venetian Walls of Nicosia) are located. 1931 refers to the date of foundation of the football club.

Traditionally Olympiakos was supported by residents of the inner old part of Nicosia within the Venetian Walls, the attendance at home games peaked in the late 1960s and early 1970s when fans from all over Cyprus would attend Olympiakos home games at the old GSP stadium filling it to its 12,000 capacity, especially when the club participated three times in the Greek First Division. After 1977 when the club won its last major title, the fanbase started to shrink. From a position where it could rival the other two Nicosia clubs, the fanbase dwindled for two reasons. Firstly outward migration from the Nicosia city centre to the suburbs after 1974 meant that the neighbourhoods of traditional Olympiakos supporters were becoming less populated, despite this trend the club made a conscious decision to leave the new clubhouse on the "green line" dividing Nicosia. Also the Turkish invasion spelt economic problems for the club and the fact that it was located in an inner city area next to the green line only made things harder. Up until the late 1990s many traditional Olympiakos supporters out of frustration for the lack of titles either stopped going to games and others switched allegiances to other Nicosia clubs that were richer and could still afford to win titles such as APOEL. It could be said that the club did not transition well from the era of amateur to semi-professional football in Cyprus beginning in the early 1980s mainly for the reasons mentioned above. Also the younger generation of Cypriots did not grow up with Olympiakos as a major power in the Cyprus league and despite their parents supporting Olympiakos they would often choose to support another side that won titles in the 1980 to 2000 years.

In general Olympiakos supporters tend to be of an older age and very rarely engage in trouble with other fans unless severely provoked. They also tend to be right wing politically, although not officially affiliated to any political party, and speak fondly of the time when Olympiakos played with other Greek teams in the Greek First Division.

In the early 2000s, with the shift from semi-professional to professional status in Cyprus football and with a wealthy President at the helm, a brief revival of the club fortunes with an UEFA cup participation, as the club finished second, after 25 years, increased the fans at the New GSP to around 5000 in the two home European games. Olympiakos fans although now less than those of the other Nicosia, Limassol teams and Anorthosis are nevertheless fiercely loyal to their team. Even when the club fell to the Second Division between 2008 and 2010 due to economic problems, 300 supporters would follow the club to even the most remote village of Cyprus, with home attendance varying between 500 and 750. At home games now in the First Division around 1000 to 2000 Olympiakos supporters will cheer the team on and are quite demanding for their team due to its past glories, one could say as demanding as other teams that have recently won silverware.

== Current squad ==
As of 13 September 2026

Note: Flags indicate national team as defined under FIFA eligibility rules; some limited exceptions apply. Players may hold more than one non-FIFA nationality.

No.	Pos.	Nation	Player
1	GK	GRE	Christos Talichmanidis
2	DF	CYP	Christoforos Frantzis
4	DF	GRE	Alexandros Doumas
5	DF	BRA	Eduardo Kunde
6	MF	CYP	Georgios Okkas
8	MF	ANG	Bruno Paz
9	FW	CYP	Zanos Savva
10	MF	AUT	Dominik Prokop
11	MF	GRE	Alexandros Lolis
12	DF	POR	Jean Felipe
13	DF	BRA	Nhayson
15	FW	EST	Rauno Sappinen

No.	Pos.	Nation	Player
20	MF	CYP	George Tziortzis (on loan from APOEL)
21	MF	CYP	Konstantinos Christou
22	DF	SYR	Marios Praxitelous Al-Herek (on loan from AEK Larnaca)
23	MF	CYP	Marios Pechlivanis
24	DF	HUN	Márk Tamás
26	FW	GRE	Panagiotis Kynigopoulos
29	FW	CYP	Kyprianos Irakleous
32	GK	CYP	Michalis Kyriakou
55	DF	POR	Henrique Gomes (Captain)
77	MF	CYP	Agapios Vrikkis
80	MF	POR	Pedro Sancho

=== Out on loan ===
Note: Flags indicate national team as defined under FIFA eligibility rules; some limited exceptions apply. Players may hold more than one non-FIFA nationality.

No.	Pos.	Nation	Player

== Coaching staff ==
Coaching	Staff
Head Coach	(Greece) Georgios Kostis
Assistant Coach	(Greece) Christos Chadjipantelides
Goalkeeping Coach	(Cyprus) Evagoras Hadjifrangiskou
Fitness Coach	(Greece) Nikos Mpintsis
Physio	(Cyprus) Constantinos Voniatis
Exercise physiologist	(Cyprus) Antonis Gregoriadis

== Former players ==
 For a full list of players with Wikipedia articles

== Managerial history ==
- (Israel) Eli Fuchs (1968–69)
- (Romania) Constantin Cernăianu (1983–85)
- (Georgia (country)) David Kipiani (1992–93)
- (Republic of Ireland) Ronnie Whelan (2000–02)
- (Cyprus) (Serbia) Svetozar Šapurić (July 2002 – June 2003)
- (Greece) Babis Tennes (2003)
- (Greece) Giorgos Foiros (2003–04)
- (Bulgaria) (Cyprus) Nikolay Kostov (2004–05), (2006–07)
- (Cyprus) (Germany) Rainer Rauffmann (May 2005 – Nov 2005)
- (Germany) Diethelm Ferner (2005–06)
- (Argentina) (Greece) Juan Ramón Rocha (2007–08)
- (Uruguay) Jorge Barrios (2008)
- (Cyprus) Nikodimos Papavasiliou (2008–09), (Nov 2009 – June 2010), (Feb 2012 – Sep 2012)
- (Serbia) (Cyprus) Saša Jovanović (2010)
- (Cyprus) Pambos Christodoulou (July 2010 – March 2011)
- (Greece) Nikos Papadopoulos (Aug 2011 – Feb 2012)
- (Cyprus) Renos Demetriades (Sep 2012 – Feb 2013)
- (Cyprus) Marios Constantinou (Feb 2013 – June 2013)
- (Cyprus) Costas Seraphim (June 2013 – December 2013)
- (Cyprus) Savvas Paraskeva (December 2013 – April 2014)
- (Serbia) (Cyprus) Goran Petkovski (July 2014 – August 2015)
- (Cyprus) Chrysis Michael (September 2015 – July 2016)
- (Cyprus) Savvas Paraskeva (August 2016 –November 2016)
- (Cyprus) Chrysis Michael (November 2016 – March 2018)
- (Serbia) Vesko Mihajlovic (March 2018;-April 2018)
- (Cyprus) Costas Malekkos (June 2018;-September 2018)
- (Belgium) Fangio Buyse (September 2018;-April 2019)
- (Cyprus) Pambos Christodoulou (June 2019;-May 2020)
- (Greece) Giannis Petrakis (June 2020;-November 2020)
- (Cyprus) Costas Seraphim (November 2020;-December 2020)
- (Greece) Leonidas Vokolos (January 2021;-January 2021)
- (North Macedonia) Čedomir Janevski (February 2021;- May 2021)
- (Greece) Giorgos Petrakis (June 2021;- December 2021)
- (Spain) Lucas Alcaraz (December 2021;- February 2022)
- (Bosnia and Herzegovina) Nedim Tutic (March 2022;- August 2022)
- (Greece) Giannis Petrakis (August 2022;-October 2022)
- (Cyprus) Makis Sergidis (October 2022;-April 2023)
- (Bosnia and Herzegovina) Nedim Tutic (April 2023;-May 2023)
- (Cyprus) Pambos Christodoulou (July 2023;-May 2024)
- (Cyprus) Nikolas Nicolaou (June 2024;-Nov 2024)
- (Greece) Georgios Kostis (Nov 2024;-Mar 2026)
- (Greece) Georgios Kostis (June 2026;-)

== Honours ==
=== Football ===
- Cypriot Championship: 3
  - 1966–67, 1968–69, 1970–71
- Cypriot Cup: 1
  - 1976–77
- Cypriot Super Cup: 1
  - 1967
- Cypriot Second Division
  - Champions (2): 1983–84, 1997–98

=== Volleyball ===
- Cypriot Championships: 2
  - 1974, 1976

== History in European competition ==
=== Overall ===
Competition	Pld	W	D	L	GF	GA	GD
European Cup	6	0	1	5	4	36	-32
European Cup Winners' Cup	2	0	0	2	1	8	-7
UEFA Cup	6	1	2	3	9	26	-17
UEFA Intertoto Cup	4	0	0	4	1	23	−22
Total	18	1	3	14	15	93	–78

=== Matches ===
Season	Competition	Round1	Club	1st leg	2nd leg	Agg.
1967–68	European Cup	1R	(Socialist Federal Republic of Yugoslavia) Sarajevo	2–2 (H)	1–3 (A)	3–5
1969–70	European Cup	1R	(Spain) Real Madrid	0–8 (H) (Note: "Home" leg played at Santiago Bernabéu Stadium)	1–6 (A)	1–14
1971–72	European Cup	1R	(Netherlands) Feyenoord	0–8 (A)	0–9 (H) (Note: "Home" leg played at De Kuip)	0–17
1973–74	UEFA Cup	1R	(West Germany) Stuttgart	0–4 (H)	0–9 (A)	0–13
1977–78	European Cup Winners' Cup	1R	(Romania) Universitatea Craiova	1–6 (H)	0–2 (A)	1–8
2001–02	UEFA Cup	QR	(Hungary) Dunaferr	2–2 (H)	4–2 (A)	6–4
2001–02	UEFA Cup	1R	(Belgium) Club Brugge	2–2 (H)	1–7 (A)	3–9
2003	UEFA Intertoto Cup	1R	(Slovakia) Dubnica	0–3 (A)	1–4 (H)	1–7
2005	UEFA Intertoto Cup	1R	(Romania) Gloria Bistrița	0–5 (H)	0–11 (A)	0–16
