= List of people from Limassol =

This is a list of people from Limassol in Cyprus. They have either resided or were born in Limassol.

== Sport ==
=== Football ===
- Marios Agathokleous, footballer
- Alekos Alekou, footballer
- Kristis Andreou, footballer
- Marios Andreou, footballer
- Evagoras Antoniou, footballer
- Marios Antoniou, footballer
- Minas Antoniou, footballer
- Georgios Aresti, footballer
- Nikolas Asprogenis, footballer
- Sofronis Avgousti, football manager and former player
- Christos Charalabous, football manager and former player
- Marios Charalambous, footballer
- Martinos Christofi, footballer
- Christakis Christoforou, football manager and former player
- Kypros Christoforou, footballer
- Athos Chrysostomou, footballer
- Panos Constantinou, footballer
- Yiannis Demetriou, footballer
- Dimitris Dimitriou, football manager
- Georgios Efrem, footballer
- Elias Elia, footballer
- Nikos Englezou, footballer
- Michalis Fani, footballer
- Filippos Filippou, footballer
- Alexandros Garpozis, footballer
- Christos Germanos, footballer
- Giannis Gerolemou, footballer
- Demetris Ioannou, football manager and former player
- Nicholas Ioannou, footballer
- Giorgos Iosifidis, football manager and former player
- Theodoros Iosifidis, footballer
- Loizos Kakoyiannis, footballer
- Andreas Keravnos, footballer
- Peter Khalife, football manager and former player
- Ioannis Kousoulos, footballer
- Panikos Krystallis, football manager and former player
- Xenios Kyriacou, footballer
- Charalampos Kyriakou, footballer
- Leonidas Kyriakou, footballer
- Marios Lefkaritis, football administrator
- Demetris Leoni, footballer
- Liasos Louka, football manager and former player
- Nikos Nicolaou, footballer
- Constantinos Makrides, footballer
- Giorgos Malekkides, footballer
- Christos Marangos, footballer
- Costas Markou, footballer
- Nikolas Mattheou, footballer
- Anthony McDonald, Scottish footballer
- Andreas Melanarkitis, footballer
- Giorgos Merkis, footballer
- Marcos Michael, footballer
- Andreas Michaelides, football manager and former player
- Konstantinos Michaelides, footballer
- Alexandros Michail, footballer
- Andreas Neofytou, footballer
- Marios Neophytou, footballer
- Marios Nicolaou, footballer
- Yiannis Pachipis, footballer
- Emilios Panayiotou, footballer
- Stylianos Panteli, footballer
- Stamatis Pantos, footballer
- Nikodimos Papavasiliou, football manager and former player
- Daniil Paroutis, footballer
- Stelios Parpas, footballer
- Ioannis Pittas, footballer
- Petros Psychas, footballer
- Andreas Sofokleous, footballer
- Athos Solomou, footballer
- Alexander Špoljarić, footballer
- Danilo Špoljarić, footballer
- Luka Špoljarić, Serbian footballer
- Matija Špoljarić, footballer
- Andreas Stavrou, footballer
- Panos Theodorou, footballer
- Christos Theophilou, footballer
- Christoforos Tsolakis, footballer
- Giorgos Vasiliou, footballer
- Kostas Vasiliou, footballer
- Elias Vattis, footballer
- Rafael Yiangoudakis, footballer
- Yiannakis Yiangoudakis, footballer
- Nicolas Vitorović, football manager and former player
- Christos Wheeler, footballer

=== Athletics (track and field) ===
- Anastasios Andreou, hurdler
- Anna Fitídou, pole vaulter
- Filipa Fotopoulou, long jumper
- Olivia Fotopoulou, track athlete
- Rennos Frangoudis, sprinter
- Yiğitcan Hekimoğlu, sprinter
- Kyriakos Ioannou, high jumper
- Petros Kyprianou, athletics coach
- Maria Lambrou, track and field athlete
- Domnitsa Lanitou-Kavounidou, sprinter
- Anninos Marcoullides, sprinter
- Nikandros Stylianou, pole vaulter
- Eleni Teloni, hammer thrower
- Paraskevi Theodorou, hammer thrower

=== Tennis ===
- Marcos Baghdatis, tennis player
- Rareș Cuzdriorean, Romanian tennis player
- Menelaos Efstathiou, tennis player
- Natasha Fourouclas, South African tennis player
- Eleftherios Neos, tennis player
- Michail Pervolarakis, tennis player

=== Other sports ===
- Georgios Angonas, gymnast
- Kalia Antoniou, swimmer
- Antonis Aresti, paralympic athlete
- Sofia Asvesta, judoka
- Andreas Charalambous, sports shooter
- Antreas Christodoulou, basketballer
- Andri Eleftheriou, sports shooter
- Ioannis Frangoudis, sport shooter / Hellenic Army Officer
- Marios Georgiou, gymnast
- Georgia Konstantinidou, sport shooter
- Manolina Konstantinou, volleyballer
- Pavlos Kontides, sailor - Olympic Medalist
- Dimitris Krasias, gymnast
- Natasa Lappa, windsurfer and sailor
- Marilena Makri, sailor
- Savvas Michael, Muay Thai fighter
- Stavros Michaelides, swimmer
- Kalia Papadopoulou, basketballer
- Maria Papadopoulou, swimmer
- Constantinos Papamichael, alpine skier
- Karolina Pelendritou, swimmer
- Costas Philippou, mixed martial artist
- Athanasios Protopsaltis, volleyballer
- George Thyrotos, basketball player and coach
- Katerina Zakchaiou, volleyballer

== Politics ==
- Nicos Anastasiades, politician (former president of the Republic of Cyprus)
- Mustafa Akıncı, politician
- Yiannis Armeftis, mayor of Limassol
- Ahmet Mithat Berberoğlu, politician
- Mustafa Çağatay, politician
- Irene Charalambidou, journalist and politician
- Andreas Christou, politician
- Efthimios Diplaros, politician
- Takis Evdokas, politician
- Loukas Fourlas, journalist and politician
- Alexis Galanos, politician
- Rina Katselli, writer and politician
- Constantinos Kombos, politician and jurist
- Erato Kozakou-Marcoullis, politician
- Markos Kyprianou, politician
- Spyros Kyprianou, politician (Former President of the Republic of Cyprus)
- Antonella Mantovani, politician
- Marios Matsakis, doctor and politician
- Nicos Nicolaides, politician
- Andreas Papadopoulos, politician
- Nicos A. Rolandis, politician
- Alexia Rotsidou, volleyball coach and politician
- Ploutis Servas, politician and author
- Stella Soulioti, attorney and politician
- Christodoulos Sozos, politician and lawyer
- Neoklis Sylikiotis, politician
- Anna Theologou, economist and politician

== Musicians ==
- Aris Antoniades, music composer
- Haris Antoniou, singer
- Constantinos Christoforou, singer
- Mark Andrew James, British music conductor
- Giannis Karagiannis, singer
- Yannis Kyriakides, music composer
- Solon Michaelides, composer and musicologist
- Stavros Michalakakos, singer
- Little Natali, child prodigy singer
- Despina Olympiou, singer
- Marios Papadopoulos, British musician
- Marios Tokas, composer

== Entertainment and the arts ==
- Stelios Arcadiou, Australian performance artist
- Myrsini Aristidou, film director
- Michael Cacoyannis, film director
- Cleo Demetriou, British actress
- Yannis Economides, screenwriter and filmmaker
- George Eugeniou, actor and writer
- Pitsa Galazi, poet and broadcaster
- Antonis Georgiou, lawyer and writer
- İsmet Güney, artist (designer of the Flag of Cyprus)
- Yaşar İsmailoğlu, poet
- Violetta J'Adore, drag queen and model
- Polyxeni Loizias, writer and feminist
- Niki Marangou, poet and author
- Vasilis Michaelides, poet
- Sotiris Moustakas, actor
- Nora Nadjarian, poet
- Loukia Nicolaidou, artist
- Christodoulos Panayiotou, artist
- Imelda Schweighart, Filipino-German actress and model
- Paul Stassino, actor
- Katy Stephanides, artist

== Business ==
- Yuri Gurski, Belarusian entrepreneur
- Stavros V. Kyriakides, businessman
- Theo Paphitis, entrepreneur

== Religion ==
- Leontios of Cyprus, archbishop
- Leontios of Neapolis, clergyman (Early medieval Bishop and Author)
- Makarios Tillyrides, bishop

== Other ==
- Zena Gunther de Tyras, philanthropist and socialite
- Panicos O. Demetriades, economist
- Eleftherios Diamandis, biochemist
- Ino Nicolaou, archaeologist
- Sergey Orlovskiy, Russian games developer
- Ari Sitas, South African sociologist
- Artemis Spyrou, nuclear astrophysicist
- Katerina Stamatiou, judge
