= Armida Publications =

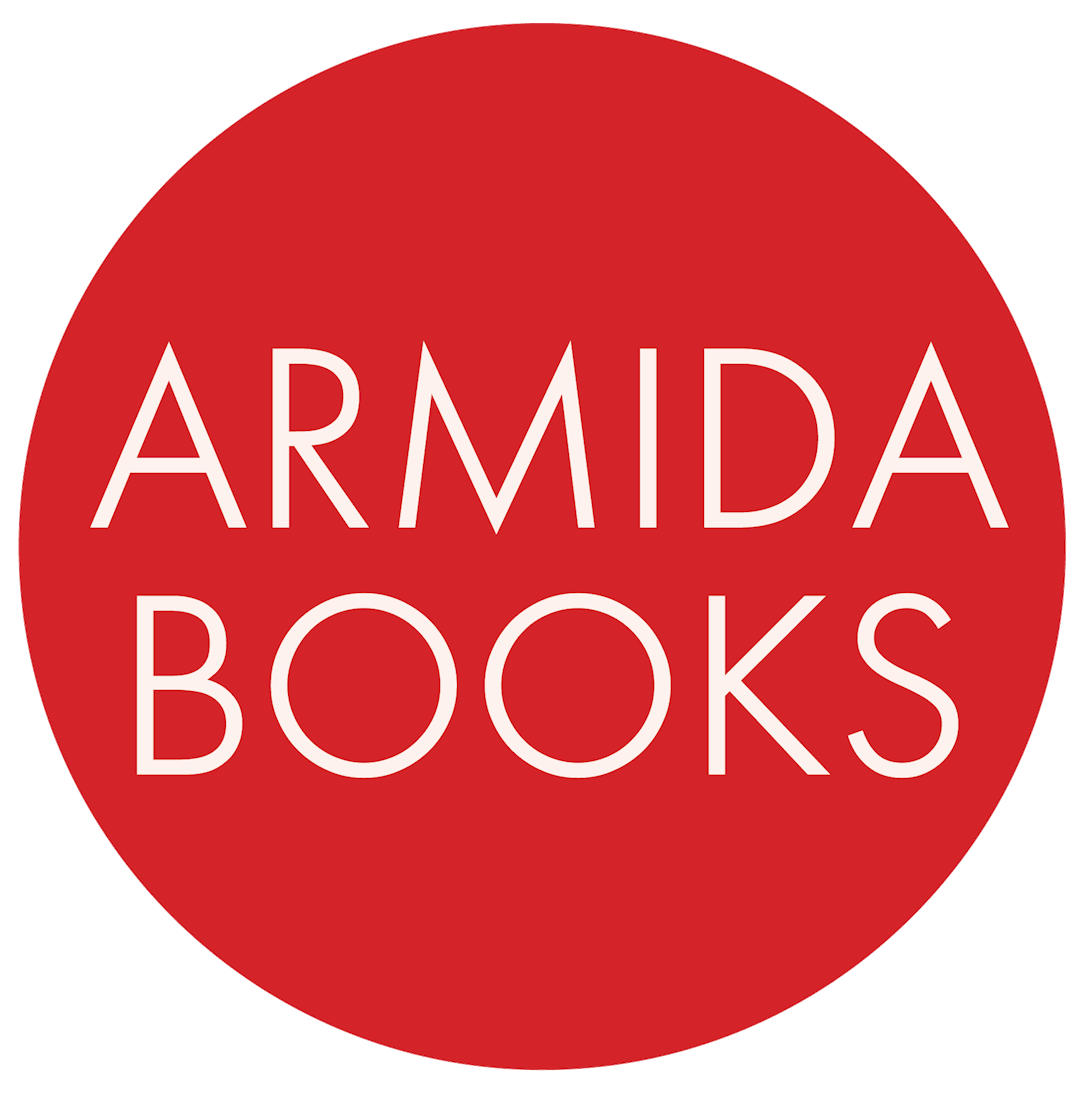
- Parent company: Armida Publications Ltd
- Founded: 1995
- Country of origin: Cyprus
- Headquarters location: Valesta 36A, Ayios Dhometios, Nicosia, Cyprus
- Distribution: Worldwide
- Publication types: Books, Ebooks
- Fiction genres: Fiction, non-fiction
- Official website: www.armidabooks.com

Armida Publications is an independent publishing house based in Nicosia, Cyprus.

Founded in 1995 their primary goal is to promote high-level English-language publications from Cyprus, Greece, and the Eastern Mediterranean region in general. Their focus on Eastern Mediterranean enables them to carry titles from authors worldwide who have the region at the core of their work.

Over the course of their history, they have won and have been nominated for awards for literature from the European Union and also the International Rubery Book Award. Their title To Peirama (The Experiment) by Myrto Azina Chronides won the European Union Prize for Literature for Cyprus in 2011. They have translated works from the likes of Roger Willemsen and Emine Sevgi Ozdamar, and have published titles by, among others, Rory Maclean, Nick Danziger, Kevin Sullivan, Miltiades B. Hatzopoulos, Paul Stewart, Andreas Karayan, Nora Nadjarian, Lina Ellina, Chrysanthos Chrysanthou, Eve Meleagrou, Richard Romanus, Colette Ni Reammon Ioannidou, Jenny Benjamin, Yiangos P. Kleopas, Stefanos Evangelides, Mona Savvidou Theodoulou, Panos Ioannides, Rina Katselli, Theoclis Kouyialis, Victoria Hardwood Butler-Sloss, George Tardios, Theo Panayides, Melissa Hekkers, Metin Murat, Andrea Busfield, Giórgos Christodoulides and many others.

Armida was the first publishing company in Cyprus to establish an active e-books program for titles in Greek and English.

In addition, the company is also the leading exporter of literary rights of Greek Cypriot literature to foreign publishers, with an extensive network of collaborating partner publishers throughout Europe, and the world.

Armida is also an active member of the Independent Publishers Guild (UK) and the Independent Book Publishers Association (USA). Armida is a founding member of the Cyprus Association of Book Publishers, itself a part of the Federation of European Publishers (FEP). Armida worked in collaboration with the Cyprus PEN Centre, and published the quarterly magazine 'In Focus'.

== History ==
=== 1995 – 2011 ===
Was predominantly Greek books distributed in Cyprus and Greece. In that period they co-published books with Aiora Press for the Greek market and also acquired rights to German titles. This early period is also noteworthy as they focused on acquiring translation rights compared to the present where they are a net exporter of the aforesaid rights.

=== 2011 – present ===
Following the success of Myrto Azina’s The Experiment, which opened Armida up to a worldwide market, they signed an agreement with Ingram for the worldwide distribution of their English titles as well as expanded their operation to include electronic books of all formats, mainly focusing on the Amazon Kindle platform.

Armida is spearheading the effort to promote and popularize Cypriot fiction outside the narrow confines of the island. Subsequently, the company has become the premier rights-exporter for Cypriot fiction. Its extended network of collaborations includes multiple titles in multiple languages including Albanian, Arabic, Bulgarian, Croatian, Czech, English, German, Macedonian, Romanian, Turkish, Serbian, Spanish, Lithuanian, etc.

== Special Projects ==
=== Work for the Deaf ===
Armida was part of a group of companies – namely AMP Filmworks Limited and Art FX – that bid for a project by the Ministry of Education and Culture of the Republic of Cyprus. They worked together to document the Cypriot sign language in a dictionary, a grammar book for teachers and a grammar book for students, accompanied by their respective DVD’s. This was a ground-breaking achievement in the realm of aids for the deaf globally as the detail undertaken was unprecedented for its time, taking three years to complete. The project was completed in 2011 and released these titles:

- Επικοινωνιακή Γραμματική (Communicative Grammar)
- Γραμματική Παραοδοσιακού Τύπου (Traditional Grammar)
- Εννοιολογικό Λεξικό (Conceptual dictionary)

Including a DVD for each book.

=== Films ===
Armida has also produced a short film by award-winning director Irena Joannides called Frequency.

== Titles ==
Armida publishes a range of books in both English and Greek. The following is a list of there most notable titles, in both English and in Greek

=== English titles ===
A list of Armida's most notable English titles.

English titles
Year	Title	Author	ISBN	Notes
2006	Ledra Street	Nora Nadjarian	9963620434	
2011	Act III: A small island in the Aegean	Richard Romanus	9789607872814	Published in collaboration with Aiora Press. Shortlisted for the International Rubery Book Award 2012|
2011	Lost Edens: A Cyprus Memoir	Harry A. Mavromatis	9789963706150	
2012	The Venetian	Lina Ellina	9789963706358	Nominated and listed for the European Book Prize|
2012	To Live or not to Live	Colette Ni Reamonn Ioannidou	9789963706198	
2012	To Die or not to Die	Colette Ni Reamonn Ioannidou	9789963706136	
2012	The Bearded Goddess: Androgynes, Goddesses and Monsters in Ancient Cyprus	Marie-Louise Winbladh	9789963706310	
2013	This Most Amazing	Jenny Benjamin	9789963706655	
2013	Master and Cancer	DRAENNE	9789963706617	
2013	Out of the West	Kevin Sullivan	9789963706907	
2014	Matoula's Echo	Richard Romanus	9789963255061	
2014	Immoral Tales: an erotic odyssey between London and Alexandria	Andreas Karayan	9789963706747	NATIONAL PRIZE FOR LITERATURE 2011 • CYPRUS
2014	Betwixt and Between	Miltiades B. Hatzopoulos - translated by Irene Noel-Baker	9789963706839	
2014	Now Then	Paul Stewart	9789963706686	
2014	Triathlon. Loving it is easy. Swim, Bike, Run. The Ultimate Beginner’s Guide.	Christos Christou	9789963706556	
2014	The Weight of the Rain	Roula Ioannidou Stavrou	9789963706153	
2015	The English Scholar's Ring	Lina Ellina	9789963255269	Nominated and listed for the European Book Prize|
2015	Census	Panos Ioannides	9789963255306	
2015	Art on the Run	Kostas Patinios & Pola Hadjipapa	9789963255368	
2016	Klotho Surfaces. The Omniconstants trilogy	Christos Rodoulla Tsiailis	9789963255436	
2016	Beneath the Carob Trees - The Lost Lives of Cyprus	Rory Maclean & Nick Danziger	9789963229758	
2017	Kyrenia's Legend: The life and time of Costas Catsellis	Rina Katselli	9789963255566	
2017	Girl, Wolf, Bones / Mädchen, Wolf, Knochen	Nora Nadjarian	9789963255580	
2017	Let Fate Decide	Niki Philippou	9789963255535	
2018	The Seamstress of Ourfa	Victoria Harwood Butler-Sloss	9789963255597	
2018	Y2.200K	Dimis Michaelides & Umit Inatci	9789963255672	
2019	Of People and Things	Paul Stewart	9789963255979	
2019	From Beyond the Sea	Miltiades B. Hatzopoulos - translated by Irene Noel-Baker	9789925573028	
2019	The Prophecy and the Templar Scroll	Lina Ellina	9789963255870	
2019	Remembering Egypt	Teresa Craig	9789963255757	
2019	SaskiaUnreserved: In Print	Saskia Constantinou	9789963255924	
2019	The Lives of Others	Theo Panayides	9789925573066	
2020	Between Pireaus and Naples	George Vizyenos Γεώργιος Βιζυηνός	9789925573134	
2020	Stories of Famagusta	Dimitris Leventis	9789925573196	
2020	Dark Tales	Andreas Karayan	9789925573257	
2020	Amir's Blue Elephant	Melissa Hekkers	9789925573318	
2020	I am Cyprus	Annetta Benzar	9789925573226	
2021	Giórgos Christodoulides - Selected Poems (1996-2021)	Giórgos Christodoulides - translated by Despina Pirketti	9789925573851	
2021	The Marches of the Levant	Miltiades B. Hatzopoulos - translated by Irene Noel-Baker	9789925573288	
2022	The Crescent Moon Fox	Metin Murat	9789925573974	
2022	Untethered	Andrea Busfield	9789925573943	

=== Greek titles ===
A list of notable Greek titles by Armida.

Greek titles
Year	Title	Author	ISBN	Notes
2006	Εδώ Γκουαντάναμο (Hier Spricht Guantánamo)	Roger Willemsen	9963620442	Translation from German
2007	Η Γέφυρα του Χρυσού Κεράτιου (Die Brücke vom Goldenen Horn)	Emine Sevgi Özdamar	9963620450	Translation of the German novel into Greek
2008	Αμερική '62: de profundis (America '62)	Πάνος Ιωαννίδης	9789607872531	Has been translated into German, Arabic and Turkish
2009	Το Πείραμα (The Experiment)	Myrto Azina Chronides	9789963620531	Winner of European Prize for Literature for Cyprus, 2010. Has been - or is being translated into Albanian, Bulgarian, Croatian, Czech, English, Lithuanian, Macedonian, Spanish and Serbian
2009	Γελοιο-γραφώντας την Ιστορία του Κυπριακού	Χρύσανθος Χρυσάνθου	9789963620623	
2011	Ανατολική Μεσόγειος	Ήβη Μελεάγρου	9789963620975	ΚΡΑΤΙΚΟ ΒΡΑΒΕΙΟ ΜΥΘΙΣΤΟΡΗΜΑΤΟΣ 1970 - NATIONAL PRIZE FOR LITERATURE
2012	Δρόμου Δρώμενα	Κώστας Πατίνιος	9789963706594	
2012	Στυλιανή Χ: Εγκλήματα και τιμωρία	Στέφανος Ευαγγελίδης	9789963706457	
2012	Κοάζινος	Πάνος Ιωαννίδης	9789963706549	ΚΡΑΤΙΚΟ ΒΡΑΒΕΙΟ ΜΥΘΙΣΤΟΡΗΜΑΤΟΣ 2012 - Has been - or is being translated into Albanian, Arabic, German, Serbian and Turkish - NATIONAL PRIZE FOR LITERATURE|
2013	Τρίαθλο: Να το λατρέψεις είναι εύκολο	Χρίστος Χρίστου	9789963706785	Το πρώτο βιβλίο στο είδος του στην Ελληνική γλώσσα. Το βιβλίο βρίσκεται ήδη στην 4η του έκδοση. Has been translated into English under the title Triathlon. Loving it is easy. Swim, Bike, Run. The Ultimate Beginner’s Guide.
2014	Η Αβάσταχτη Φιλοπατρία του Π.Φ.Κ.	Πάνος Ιωαννίδης	9789963255085	Επανέκδοση - ΚΡΑΤΙΚΟ ΒΡΑΒΕΙΟ ΜΥΘΙΣΤΟΡΗΜΑΤΟΣ 1989 - NATIONAL PRIZE FOR LITERATURE
2014	Οι Ντέβα	Πάνος Ιωαννίδης	9789963255115	Επανέκδοση - Has been - or is being translated into German and Turkish
2014	Απογραφή	Πάνος Ιωαννίδης	9789963255092	Επανέκδοση - ΚΡΑΤΙΚΟ ΒΡΑΒΕΙΟ ΜΥΘΙΣΤΟΡΗΜΑΤΟΣ 1973 - Has been - or is being translated into Lithuanian and English - NATIONAL PRIZE FOR LITERATURE
2014	Κουνήσου μούχλα...	Κώστας Πατίνιος / Πόλα Χατζήπαπα	9789963706146	Το πρώτο βιβλίο στο είδος του στην Ελληνική γλώσσα.
2014	Μήδειες και Κλυταιμνήστρες	Στέφανος Ευαγγελίδης	9789963706990	
2014	Μνήμες που επιστρέφουν	Θεοκλής Κουγιάλης	9789963255252	
2014	Μαθηματικές δραστηριότητες για το νηπιαγωγείο	Μαρία Σιακαλλή	9789963255139	Το πρώτο βιβλίο στο είδος του στην Ελληνική γλώσσα.
2015	Αμμόχωστος: Η Ατέλειωτη Ιστορία	Γιάγκος Π. Κλεόπας	9789963255351	
2016	Η ανάπτυξη της μαθηματικής σκέψης στο νηπιαγωγείο	Μαρία Σιακαλλή	9789963255399	Το πρώτο βιβλίο στο είδος του στην Ελληνική γλώσσα.
2016	Διαχείριση ασφάλειας αθλητικών εγκαταστάσεων	Γιώργος Γιαπανάς	9789963255412	Το πρώτο βιβλίο στο είδος του στην Ελληνική γλώσσα.
2016	Κάτω από τις Χαρουπιές – Οι χαμένες ζωές της Κύπρου	Rory Maclean & Nick Danziger	9789963229734	Συνέκδοση με Διερευνητική Επιτροπή για τους Αγνοούμενους και Galeri Kultur Publishing
2016	Το λογοτεχνικό έργο του Πάνου Ιωαννίδη: Κριτικές	Ανθολογία επτά κριτικών μελετών	9789963255450	
2017	Κουμπωμένα Σχήματα / Buttoned-Up Shapes	George Tardios	9789963255559	
2018	Παρ' ολίγον	Μαρία Αβρααμίδου	9789963255726	ΚΡΑΤΙΚΟ ΒΡΑΒΕΙΟ ΔΙΗΓΗΜΑΤΟΣ/ΝΟΥΒΕΛΑΣ 2018
2019	Γράμμα στη Μητέρα	Ε. Μύρων	9789925573103	
2019	Έχω 33 στιγμές να ζήσω	Πάνος Βασιλείου	9789963255955	
2019	Ίχνη μνήμης / Hafιza izleri	Αλεξάνδρα Ζαμπά & Umit Inatci	9789963255900	
2019	Μαθθαίννω Κυπριακά	Αναστάσιος Πισσούριος	9789925755301	Το πρώτο βιβλίο στο είδος του στην Ελληνική γλώσσα.
2019	Ονειρικά διηγήματα	Πάνος Ιωαννίδης	9789963255856	Has been translated into Bulgarian
2020	Οι εγκλωβισμένοι του Ξενοδοχείου Ντόουμ - Τόμος Α	Ρήνα Κατσελλή	9789925573370	
2020	Οι εγκλωβισμένοι του Ξενοδοχείου Ντόουμ - Τόμος Β	Ρήνα Κατσελλή	9789925573424	
2020	14 Διηγήματα - Τόμος Α	Πάνος Ιωαννίδης Panos Ioannides	9789925573431	
2020	14 Διηγήματα - Τόμος Β	Πάνος Ιωαννίδης Panos Ioannides	9789925573448	
2020	Τζιαι πόψε	Παύλος Παμπορίδης	9789925573486	Shortlisted for the NATIONAL PRIZE FOR LITERATURE
2021	Η θάλασσα θα είναι λίγο ταραγμένη	Νόρα Νατζαριάν Nora Nadjarian	9789925573837	
2021	Εν παρενθέσει...	Πάνος Ιωαννίδης Panos Ioannides	9789925573660	
2022	Παράνοια	Ρήνα Κατσελλή	9789925601097	
2023	Ο δολοφόνος με το καλαμάκι	Κωνσταντίνος Ν. Μακρής	9789925601394	ΚΡΑΤΙΚΟ ΒΡΑΒΕΙΟ ΔΙΗΓΗΜΑΤΟΣ/ΝΟΥΒΕΛΑΣ 2023
2024	Επιλεγμένα Ποιήματα	Desmond Egan	9789925601660	Μετάφραση: Δέσποινα Πυρκεττή
