= Antoniou =

Antoniou (Greek: Αντωνίου) is a Greek surname. It derived from the Antonius root name. Notable examples include:

== Men ==
- Giannis Antoniou (born 2005), Cypriot judoka
- Kostas Antoniou (born 1962), Greek footballer
- Marios Antoniou (born 1980), Greek footballer
- Platon Antoniou (born 1968), English-Greek photographer
- Theodore Antoniou (1935–2018), Greek conductor and composer
- Haris Antoniou (born 1989), Greek-Cypriot singer and musician

== Women ==
- Angeliki Antoniou (born 1956), Greek director and screenwriter
- Laura Antoniou (born 1963), American novelist
- Ria Antoniou (born 1988), Greek model

== See also ==
- Papantoniou
