= African Theological Studies =

Book series

African Theological Studies (Études Théologiques Africaines) is a book series published by Peter Lang Verlagsgruppe under the ISSN number 2196-0615. It includes, as of 2021, a total of 22 volumes written in English and French. Some editors have changed over the years since 2013, when the series was founded, but the University of Würzburg Professor Gerhard Droesser was a founding editor and serves as an editor still. The co-editors are currently Esther Hornung and Frédéric Fungula Kwilu. Chibueze Clement Udeani has served as the editor of some volumes. Many of the monographs were originally submitted as dissertations at the Catholic Theology Faculty of the University of Würzburg. According to the title pages of each volume, the series is peer-reviewed.

== Scope of the Series ==
The editors of the series seek to promote "the characteristics of African theology and its independence". Many of the authors are from Nigeria; almost all of them are from Africa. Bernhard Dinkelaker's monograph was a successful book in the series, since it was a European reception of the work of the African theologian Kwame Bediako, important to African but not that well-known in Europe and North America. The book was well-received by reviewer Kees van Dam.

== Criticism of the Series' Academic Integrity ==
=== Misleading Book Titles ===
In 2014, Blaise Okachibe Okpanachi published his Würzburg dissertation on missionary history in modern Nigeria in the first volume of a subseries of ATS devoted to church history. Edmund Hogan stated in his book review published in Catholic Historical Review that: "The problem with this book, however, is its title. Nigerian-Vatican Diplomatic Relations purports to be a study of diplomatic relations between Nigeria and the Vatican for the period 1884–1950. This does not reflect well on the general editorship of the series, for in the 300 pages of this book only twenty-nine pages have any sort of relevance to this title (pp. 191–212, 221–29). Moreover, in these few pages, there are serious problems."

=== Reliance on Secondary Sources that are not Peer-Reviewed or Vetted ===
Chimaka's 2014 monograph (volume 6 in the series) is devoted to Nigerian education and nation-building.

Text on p. 11 about artisans, leaders and wives in Aristotelian and Platonic notions of education are taken from p. 10 in Rao's History of Education. Rao's book was published in New Delhi in 2005, and is not to be found in a single online-catalogue for German-speaking Europe (Chimaka submitted his dissertation at Würzburg). Any number of authoritative histories of education would have been available in European libraries.

Much of p. 17 is plagiarized as well, such as the following sentence, taken verbatim from a 2010 source: "Education encompasses both the teaching and learning of knowledge, proper conduct, and technical competency. It thus focuses on the cultivation of skills, trades or professions, as well as mental, moral and aesthetic development."

=== Plagiarizing Academic and Non-Academic Sources ===
While Nwaigwe's 2013 study of canonical law and marriage in Nigeria (volume 6 in the series) references some academic publications, it does not always give credit where necessary. On p. 90, almost all of the third paragraph is copied verbatim from Glenn Olsen's study of the history of marriage. In another section, the passage "civil divorce cannot dissolve the marriage bond, and a divorced person cannot enter into a new valid marriage while the first spouse is still alive" (p. 98) is verbatim from a Liberian source; he does not cite it. If made aware of the source, many would question why such introductory facts are being taken from a Liberian newsletter. The second paragraph on p. 127 is taken verbatim from Gerard Sheehy's practical guide to canon law, but without attributing Sheehy.

The Nigerian doctoral candidate also copies from inappropriate sources. At the end of the second paragraph on p. 317, there is verbatim text overlap from a handbook for marriage preparation issued for parish use by the Archdiocese of Newark. Such texts are not usually considered valid sources for research on the doctoral level.

Author published the 20th monograph in the series in 2020. He teaches canon law. The book on participative structures in the AMECEA plagiarizes from a book by Makarios Tillyrides, the Eastern Orthodox Archbishop of Nairobi. He uses the following sentence on p. 46-47 without attributing its author: "It is especially the concern of the local church and entrusted to the guide of the local bishop to coordinate the commitment to evangelization, by gathering the faithful together, confirming them in the Faith through the priests and supporting them in the fulfillment of their respective tasks." It was originally published on p. 389 of Tillyride's 2011 book.

=== Lack of English Proficiency ===
==== Volume 4, Marriage Preparation in the Igbo Tradition ====
Nwaigwe's book on marriage includes a section on the Nigerian fattening ceremony and describes the bride "before she finally leaved her home" (p. 232). Another paragraph begins as follows: "Also such theme like sexuality has to be made clear to them that sex is intimately connected with our personal identity" (p. 299).

==== Volume 8, Religious Education ====
Sister Chizurum Ugbor's dissertation, Living the Future in Dialogue, was accepted by the University of Leuven and printed as the eighth volume in the series in 2015. The following examples are evidence for insufficient linguistic skills:

- "Political leaders, as well, use youths to get their political powers, which often lead to bloody shedding of human beings." (p. 24)
- "Education in Nigeria is as old as the country itself and is considered as a formative process that enables the citizens to meet up their challenging and changing situations to live and fit in a dynamic society." (p. 33)

=== Erroneous Bibliography ===
==== Volume 2, Solving the Problems of Poverty ====
Kwazu's book on African poverty was the second monograph in the series. His bibliography lists "Hillman, K., Wörterbuch der Soziologie, Kröner, Stuttgart, Bd. 410, 1994" on p. 252, but Hillmann should be spelled with two n's and the dictionary does not contain 410 volumes, as Kwazu's entry suggests, but is volume 410 in the series called "Kröners Taschenausgabe". The 1994 printing is, furthermore, the fourth, revised edition.

The bibliography cites E. Leuninger's "Take (sic) to Catholic Workers' Movement, (KAB) Diocese of Limburg, Germany, 1 April 2001" (p. 255). The talk (not "take") was certainly held in German, and Kwazu's bibliography lists several German titles, but here, Kwazu gives no specific title, making the reference inaccessible.

==== Volume 13, Women's Emancipation in Africa ====
Mutume's monograph on women's rights (volume 13 in the series) cites the Vatican's 1976 "Declaration on the Question of Admission of Women to the Ministerial Priesthood" and lists it twice in the bibliography, once under A for Austin Flannery, and once under F. Both are incorrect, since it was signed by Franjo Cardinal Seper, then Prefect of the Congregation of the Doctrine of the Faith. The Dominican priest Austin Flannery was the translator; listing him as its author is confusing.

The bibliography also mistakenly cites Tamale's 2003 article "Out of the Closet" as having been published in 2005. Furthermore, Mutume identifies no page numbers for the Tamale publication. Since it has been republished several time, giving page numbers would be one way of helping readers confirm they have the right version at hand.

Mutume cites from Together, a journal published by World Vision International, which has often been criticized for unethical fundraising techniques and corruption. The bibliography lists the article under the authors's first name (Graeme), thus suggesting that Mutume was unable to distinguish it from the last (Irvine). In any case, magazines distributed by World Vision to their donors are unusual sources for doctoral dissertations.

Blind references to publications unseen by Mutume appear regularly in confusing dead ends. One bibliographical entry cites "Schrijvers, quoted in Stromquist", but gives no title or page numbers for the Schrijvers publication (p. 219). The same page in the bibliography lists two entries under T because they begin with "The". This page of the bibliography ends with the following puzzling entry: "Women; Definitions. UNICEF. Retrieved on 20th February 2012". Without citing the URL or the bibliographical container, this entry is useless.
