= SVK =

SVK is an initialism which may refer to:

- Slovakia, IOC and ISO 3166-1 alpha-3 code
- SVK (comics), by Warren Ellis
- SVK (software), a version control system co-developed by Audrey Tang
- SVK Systems, a distributor of an RC flight simulator
- SVK Pianotech Ltd of Cyprus, MD Stavros V. Kyriakides
- Former Air Slovakia, ICAO code
- Army of the Republic of Serb Krajina (Srpska Vojska Krajine)
- Seven Kings railway station, London, station code
- Svenska kraftnät, the agency responsible for the Swedish electric transmission grid
