= Judiciary of Cyprus =

System of courts in Cyprus that interprets and applies the law

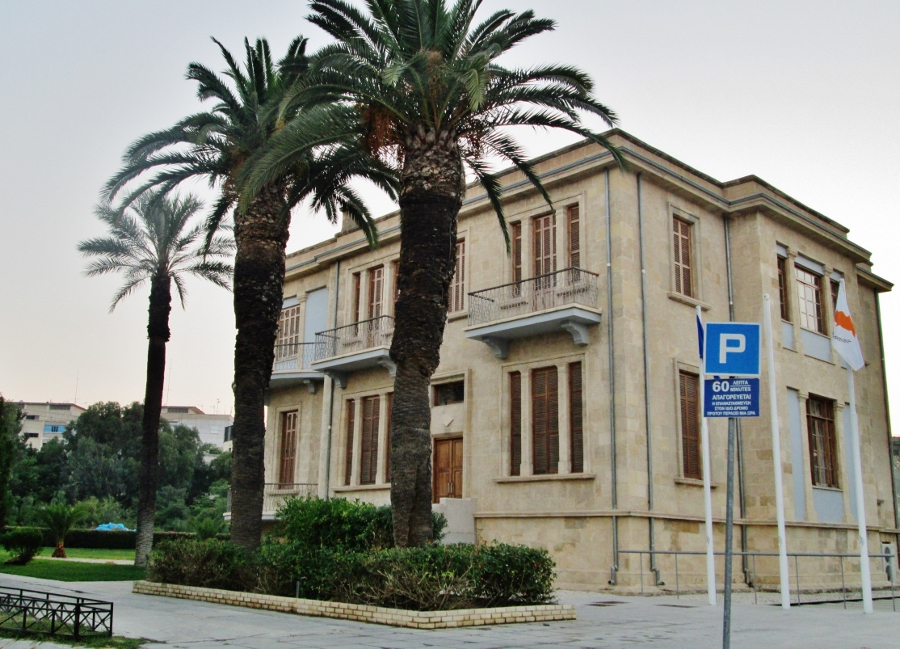
Supreme Court building, Nicosia

The Judiciary of Cyprus is the system of courts which interprets and applies the law in Cyprus. It is largely based on the English model. Judicial independence is safeguarded by the Constitution.

== Law ==
The applicable laws in Cyprus are the Constitution, the laws of Article 188 in the Constitution, the Common Law and Equity and laws enabled by the Cyprus House of Representatives. After independence in 1960, Cyprus retained many colonial laws, integrating them with new laws enacted by its House of Representatives. These laws are guided by the principles of common law and equity, as outlined in the Constitution of the Republic of Cyprus and supplemented by European Union law after Cyprus's accession in 2004.

== Courts Overview ==
Cyprus's court system includes six District Courts, one for each district (Nicosia, Famagusta, Limassol, Larnaca, Paphos, and Kyrenia). Since the 1974 Turkish invasion, the Famagusta District Court temporarily resides in Paralimni, and the Kyrenia District Court in Nicosia. District Courts have jurisdiction over all civil disputes except those specifically assigned to the Rent Control Court, the Labor Disputes Court, and the Family Court. They also handle criminal cases with imprisonment penalties of up to five years.

The Assize Courts have unlimited jurisdiction over any criminal case, typically dealing with offenses punishable by more than five years of imprisonment. These courts are composed of a District Court President and two senior or regular District Judges, depending on the case.

Specialized courts, such as the Family Court, deal with divorce, custody, maintenance, and property disputes among Orthodox Christians, with separate courts for other religious groups. The Rent Control Court handles cases related to tenancy and rent issues, while the Labor Disputes Court exclusively deals with employment-related disputes.

== District Courts ==
The District Courts are courts of first instance for civil matters (except those which are dealt with by special courts such as the Family Court, the Rent Control Court, or the Industrial Disputes Court) and criminal cases involving prison sentences of five years or less. There are six such courts: Nicosia, Famagusta, Kyrenia (located in Nicosia), Larnaca, Limassol, and Paphos. Their judgments, almost all written in Greek, are published free of charge on CyLaw.

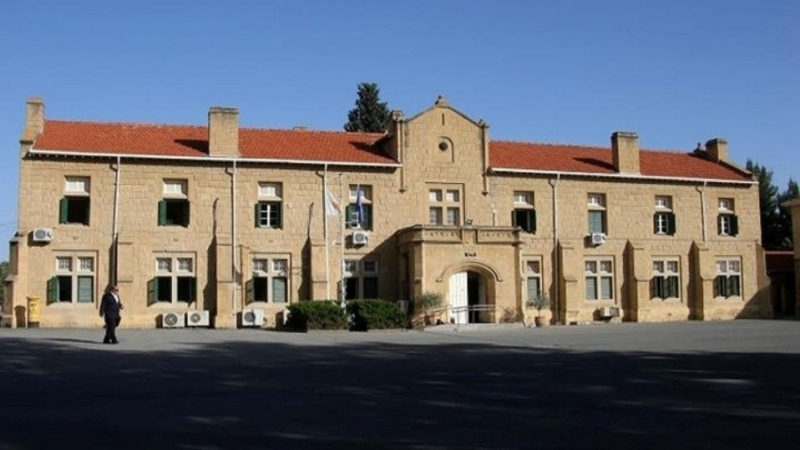
Nicosia District Courts

== Assize Courts ==
The Assize Courts are courts first instance for criminal cases which involve prison sentences of more than five years.

The Assize Courts consist of three judges with no jury and may be composed of either:

- a district president and two district judges
- a district president, a senior district judge and a district judge
- a district president and two senior district judges.

There are four such courts: Nicosia, Larnaca, Limassol, and Paphos.

== The Supreme Court ==
The Supreme Court was established in 1964 from a merger of the Supreme Constitutional Court and the High Court. Although it can act as a court of first instance it is primarily an appeal court for both civil and criminal cases. As an appellate court the Supreme Court can review and re-examine all the evidence, request or admit other evidence and order cases to be reheard. It is based in Nicosia.

Since the judicial reform that took effect on 1 July 2023, the Supreme Court has seven judges, one of whom acts as the court president, and hears third-instance civil and criminal appeals (by leave), prerogative writs and pending legacy appeals. Constitutional matters passed to the re-established Supreme Constitutional Court, and a new Court of Appeal now hears civil and criminal appeals from first-instance courts. Before the reform, the Supreme Court was composed of 13 judges and also acted as the constitutional and administrative court.

== Other courts ==
There are three Family Courts: one for Nicosia and Kyrenia, one for Limassol and Paphos and one for Larnaca and Famagusta which decide in divorce, child custody and real estate matters. There is also a family court for religious groups in Nicosia.

There are two Rent Control Courts which try cases of recovery of property, property rentals and associated matters.

There are three Industrial Disputes Tribunals, based in Nicosia, Larnaca and Limassol, which have jurisdiction over employment matters.

The Military Court has jurisdiction over military matters.

In May 2022, the Cypriot House of Representatives enacted Law 69(I)/2022, establishing the Commercial Court and Admiralty Court. This legislation introduces two specialized courts dedicated to resolving disputes in commercial and maritime law, respectively.

== Judges ==
Judges are members of the Judicial Service of the Republic. All judges, except those of the Supreme Court, are appointed by the Supreme Council of Judicature, a body composed of the judges of the Supreme Court, which is responsible for their appointment, promotion, transfer and discipline. Supreme Court Judges are appointed by the President of the Republic on the recommendation of the Supreme Court.

There are 85 judges serving in all courts of first instance and seven judges serving in the Supreme Court. They cannot be removed from office except under very exceptional circumstances. Supreme Court Judges retire at the age of 68, whereas those of all other courts retire at the age of 63.

== See also ==
- Chief Justice of Cyprus - Colonial era
