= Papantoniou =

Papantoniou (Greek: Παπαντωνίου) is a Greek surname. According to Greek naming conventions, these people are descendant of a priest named Antonis. Notable people with the surname include:

- Epameinondas Papantoniou (born 1990), Greek professional basketball player
- Evelina Papantoniou (born 1979), Greek fashion model and actress
- Giannis Papantoniou (1928–2015), Greek footballer
- Ioanna Papantoniou (1936–2026), Greek author, scenic designer, costume designer and folklorist
- Nondas Papantoniou (born 1990), Greek basketball player
- Yiannos Papantoniou (born 1949), Greek politician
- Zacharias Papantoniou (1877–1940), Greek writer and journalist

== See also ==
- Antoniou
