= Panos Ioannides =

Cypriot novelist and playwright

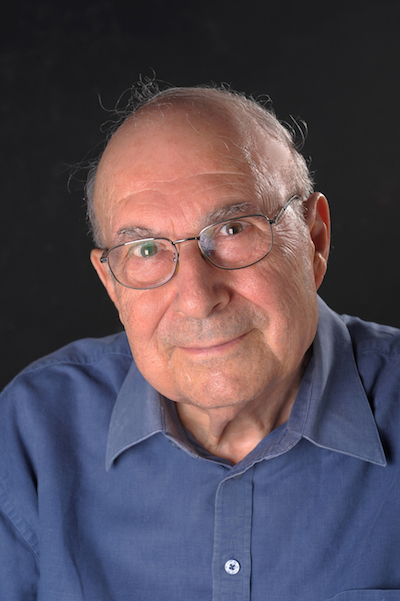
- Panos Ioannides in 2011
- Born: 22 March 1935; Famagusta, Cyprus
- Died: 4 July 2021 (aged 86); Nicosia, Cyprus
- Occupations: Novelist, playwright
- Spouse: Chloe Ioannidou
- Children: Irena Joannides, Haris Ioannides
- Writing career
- Genres: Novel, novella, short story, theatre, poetry
- Notable works: Gregory, Ameriki 62, Peter the First, The Suitcase, and Ventriloquists
- Notable awards: Excellence in Letters, Arts and Sciences (2007), «Theodosis Pierides and Tefkros Anthias» Prize (1992), National Prize for Literature (1968, 1973, 1979, 1989, 2012)

Panos Ioannides (Greek: Πάνος Ιωαννίδης; 22 March 1935 – 4 July 2021) was a Cypriot novelist and playwright.

== Biography ==
Panos Ioannides was born in Famagusta, Cyprus, in 1935. He studied Mass Communications and Sociology in the United States and Canada. He served as Director of Radio and Television Programmes at the Cyprus Broadcasting Corporation. He began writing literature, mostly prose and theatre, in 1955. Works of his have been translated and published in their entirety or in parts in French, German, Arabic, Japanese, English, Russian, Romanian, Chinese, Hungarian, Polish, Serbo-Croat, Turkish, Persian, Bulgarian, Swedish, Dutch, Spanish, and other languages. His plays Gregory, Peter the First, The Suitcase, and Ventriloquists have been staged in Greece, England, USA and Germany. He served as Chairman of the Cyprus Theatre Organization (ThOK) Repertory Committee, and as President of the Cypriot PEN Centre, the Cyprus chapter of PEN International. He lives in Nicosia, Cyprus. Ioannides died on 4 July 2021, at the age of 86.

== Works ==
=== Prose ===
- IN ETHERIAL CYPRUS, short stories, G. Fexis Publications, Athens, 1964
- CYPRUS EPICS, short stories, P.K.I. Publications, Cyprus, 1968
- KRONAKA, VOLUMES I & II, novellas and short stories, I.M. Publications, Cyprus 1970 and 1972
- CENSUS Απογραφή, novel, I.M. Publications, Cyprus, 1973 Second edition, Ledra Publications, Athens, 1993
- THE UNSEEN ASPECT, novellas and short stories, Kinyras Publications, Cyprus, 1979
- THREE PARABLES BY NICOLAOS KEYS, JOURNALIST Τρείς Παραβολές, novellas, Kinyras Publications, Cyprus, 1989
- THE UNBEARABLE PATRIOTISM OF P.F.K. Η Αβάσταχτη Φιλοπατρία του Π.Φ.Κ., novel, Kinyras Publications, Cyprus, 1989 Second Edition, Kastaniotis Publications, Athens 1990
- SAILING, VOLUMES I & II, novellas and short stories, Alassia Publications, Cyprus 1992
- DEVAS Οι Ντέβα, novel, Armida Publications, Cyprus 2006
- AMERICA '62: De Profundis Αμερική 62: De Profundis, novel, Armida Publications and AIORA PRESS, Cyprus and Greece December 2007
- KOAZINOS Κοάζινος, novel, Armida Publications, Cyprus 2012

=== Plays ===
- THE MAN FROM SALINA, Ο άνθρωπος από την Σαλίνα, Έκδοση περιοδικού «Κυπριακά Χρονικά» 1964, Cyprus 1964
- PLAYS FROM THE BIBLE, Δραματάκια από τη Βίβλο. Εκδοση Πολίτη, Αθήνα 1970, Athens 1970
- PYGMALION AND GALATIA, Cyprus 1973
- YOU, WHO DIED FOR THE LIGHT Συ που σκοτώθεις για το φως, Cyprus 1962 Revised edition, Armida Publications, Cyprus 2004
- THREE PLAYS (The Bath, Ventriloquists, Gregory), Kinyras Publications, Cyprus 1973
- ONESILUS, Proodos Publications, Cyprus 1981
- THREE ONE-ACT PLAYS (The Suitcase, Dry Martini, Cousins), P.K.I. Publications, Cyprus 1984
- FOTINOS Φωτεινός, Armida Publications, Cyprus 2000
- MEMORIAL SERVICE, SIMAE Publications, Cyprus 2002
- LEONTIOS AND SMYRNA Λεόντιος και Σμύρνα, Armida Publications, Cyprus 2005

=== Poetry ===
- SONGS OF SHIGERU AND OTHER POEMS, Cyprus 1966
- IN PARENTHESIS Εν Παρενθέσει..., Armida Publications, Cyprus 2000

=== Anthologies ===
- CYPRUS HIGHLIGHTS, with Leonidas Malenis, Cyprus 1963
- ANTHOLOGY OF CYPRIOT SHORT-STORIES, with Andreas Christofides, I.M. Publications, Cyprus 1969
- ANTHOLOGY OF THE EOKA STRUGGLE, I.M. Publications, Cyprus 1973
- FACE OF AN ISLAND, 24 short stories from Cyprus in English, Armida Publications, Cyprus 1997
- FACE OF AN ISLAND, 25 Cypriot poets translated in English, Armida Publications, Cyprus 2000
- EUROPE IN CYPRIOT PROSE, Bilingual, Armida Publications, Cyprus 2006
- EUROPE IN CYPRIOT ESSAY WRITINGS, Bilingual, Armida Publications, Cyprus 2006

=== Magazines ===
- IN FOCUS , quarterly magazine, Cyprus PEN Centre DEC 2003 ~

=== TV and Cinema scenarios ===
- GREGORY: Directed by Evis Gavrielides, the televised version was shown by the CyBCTV, TV Greece and other European TV Stations, as well as by the National TV Network of Australia.
- ASINOU: A documentary on the Chapel of Asinou, directed by Panos Ioannides. This church belongs to a group of nine Troodos Mountain Churches included in the World Heritage Monuments selected by UNESCO. The documentary was shown in Cyprus, Greece and other countries.
- THE TILLYRIA BOMBINGS: Documentary filmed by the writer in Tillyria district, Paphos, during the bombing of this district of Cyprus by the Turkish air force in 1964.
- KYRIAKOS MATSIS: Documentary on the life of the hero of the Cyprus liberation struggle, Kyriakos Matsis.
- PETER THE FIRST: Scenario for the historical TV series of eleven, forty-five-minute episodes. The series was shown in Cyprus and by the CyBC Satellite TV.
- TROUBLED YEARS: Scenario for a TV series of the same name, in collaboration with Hera Genagritou. It was shown on MEGA TV, Cyprus.

== Translated works ==
Works of Panos Ioannides have been translated and published in their entirety or in parts, in various languages.

- POEMS: French translation of Song for Shigeru and other poems. Translated by Gaston Henry Aufrére, Edition Subervie, Rodez, France, 1968
- POEMS: Japanese translation of Song for Shigeru and other poems.
- PETROS I ODER DIE BALLADE DER ARODAFNUSSA: Translation of the play «Peter I». It was published in German in 1987 by Romiosini Publishing House. Translated by Gudrun Rohr, it was staged the same year by the Cologne Theatre «Comedia».
- TROIS PARABLES DE NIKOLAOS KEIS - JOURNALIST: Translated by Helen Reboud, the prose book «Three parables by N. Keys, journalist», was published in a bilingual edition by the University of Nancy, France and the Editions «Praxandre», in 1996.
- THE UNBEARABLE PATRIOTISM OF P.F.K.: The novel was published in Romanian by the Meronia Publishing House, Bucharest, 2001
- FIVE NOVELAS: KINYRAS, GREGORIOS AND EFTHYMIOS, KING ALEXIS, KYPRIANI, PHOTOGRAPHS, Translated in Bulgaria by Georgi Konstantinov
- AMERICA 62: DE PROFUNDIS, Translated in German by Brigite Munch, Published by Verlag auf dem Ruffel
- AMERICA 62: DE PROFUNDIS, Translated in Turkish by Lale Alatli, Published by Orm and Ruffel
- AMERICA 62: DE PROFUNDIS, Translated in Arabic by Dr. Khaled Raouf, Published by Sefsafa Culture & Publishing
- AMERICA 62: DE PROFUNDIS, Translated in Albanian by Kleo Lati, Published by OMBRA GVG
- KOAZINOS, Translated in German by Michaela Prinzinger, Published by Verlag auf dem Ruffel
- KOAZINOS, Translated in Arabic by Dr. Khaled Raouf, Published by Sefsafa Culture & Publishing
- KOAZINOS, Translated in Turkish by Lale Alatli, Published by OPM and Ruffel
- KOAZINOS, Translated in Serbian, Published by Karpos Books
- KOAZINOS, Translated in Albanian by Kleo Lati, Published by OMBRA GVG
- CENSUS, Translated in English by Despina Pirketti, Published by Armida Publications
- CENSUS, Translated in Lithuanian by Dalia Staponkute, Published by Alma littera
- DEVAS, Translated in German by Brigite Munch, Published by Groessenwahn Verlag
- DEVAS, Translated in Turkish by Lale Alatli, Published by Orm and Ruffel

Short stories and novellas by Panos Ioannides have been published in the following anthologies and magazines:

- SHORT STORY INTERNATIONAL, New York, Issues 60, 62 and 98
- SUDDEN FICTION, World short story anthology, Norton and Co, New York-London, 1992
- THE STORY TELLER, International Prose Anthology, Edition Nelson, Canada, 1992
- FOREIGN LITERATURE, Cyprus Prose Anthology in Chinese, Beijing 1988
- ZYPRISCHEN MINIATUREN, Romiosini Publications, Cologne, 1987
- KALIMERHABA, Trilingual Cyprus Prose and Poetry Anthology in German, Greek and Turkish, Romiosini Publications, Cologne, 1992
- CIPRUSI GOROG ELBESZELESEK, Cyprus Anthology in Hungarian, Europa Konyukiado Publishing, Budapest, 1985
- PROSE AND POETRY, Hellenica Chronica Publ., Paris 1993
- GRIEKENLAND AAN ZEE, Anthology of Greek Literature in Dutch, Chimaira Publishing, Groningen, the Netherlands, 2001
- LITERATURA DE LA ISLA DE CHIPRE, Anthology in Spanish, Universidad de la Playa Ancha, Chile, 2003
- GREEK WRITERS TODAY, Volume I, Hellenic Authors Society Publ.

== Awards ==
He has been awarded five National Prizes for Literature by the Cyprus Ministry of Education and Culture for his works:

- CYPRUS EPICS, short stories, 1968
- CENSUS, Novel, 1973
- THE UNSEEN ASPECT, short stories, 1979
- THE UNBEARABLE PATRIOTISM OF P.F.K., novel, 1989
- KOAZINOS, novel, 2012

Prizes awarded for his theatrical plays:

- GREGORY, 1st Prize at the 5th International Theatrical Festival, Sofia, 1976
- ONESILUS, 1st Prize of the Cyprus Society of Playwrights, 1980
- DRY MARTINI, 1st Prize of Cyprus National Theatre Organization, 1984

In 1992 Panos Ioannides was awarded the «Theodosis Pierides and Tefkros Anthias» Prize for his contribution to Cyprus Literature. In 2007 he won the highest award given by the Republic of Cyprus to a writer: Excellence in Letters, Arts and Sciences. In 2009 Panos Ioannides was awarded the «George Philippou Pierides Prize» for his Prose Works, by the Union of Cypriot Writers

== Reviews and interviews ==
Reviews of his work and interviews are published regularly in the press. The most recent reviews include:

- Η τριλογία μιας γεμάτης ζωής - ΠΑΡΑΘΥΡΟ | ΠΟΛΙΤΗΣ
- Δύο μυθιστορήματα κι ένας αιώνας ανάμεσά τους (Μέρος Α’) - Αλήθεια Online
- Δύο μυθιστορήματα κι ένας αιώνας ανάμεσά τους (Μέρος B’) - Αλήθεια Online
- The Short Review - A J Kirby
- Αμερική, ένα κατόρθωμα στον τομέα της μυθιστοριογραφίας, περιοδικό Φρέαρ – του Χριστόδουλου Καλλίνου
- Ο Πάνος Ιωαννίδης και η αθέατη όψη της Κύπρου - της Φραγκίσκης Αμπατζοπούλου
