= Myrto Azina Chronides =

Greek Cypriot writer

Myrto Azina Chronides (1961–2021) was a Greek Cypriot writer. She was born in Nicosia and started writing at a young age. She studied at the Pancyprian Gymnasium, before going on to medical school. She also studied at the University of Bonn in Euskirchen and worked in public health in Cyprus.

Azina Chronides published her first book Hemerologion when she was just fifteen years old. She won the EU Prize for Literature for To Peirama (The Experiment).

== Books ==
- Το πείραμα (The Experiment). Armida Publications. 2009. ISBN 978-9963620531.
