= Supreme Court of Cyprus =

Highest court in Cyprus

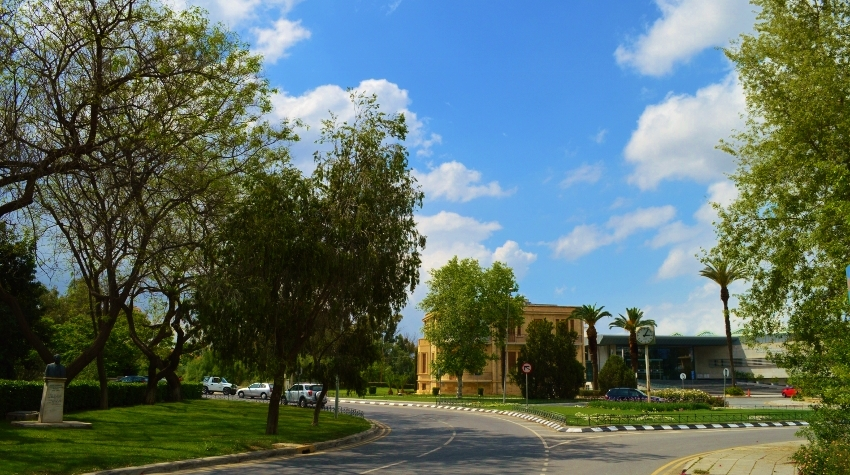
Supreme Court buildings

The Supreme Court of Cyprus (Greek: Ανώτατο Δικαστήριο Κύπρου, romanized: Anótato Dikastírio Kýprou, Turkish: Kıbrıs Yüksek Mahkemesi) is the highest court of the Republic of Cyprus. It was established in 1964 from a merger of the Supreme Constitutional Court and the High Court.

The Supreme Court is responsible both for examining whether the laws of the Republic can be justified by the situation and whether or not they violate human rights and for acting as an Appeal Court. It also acts as an admiralty and administrative court and can also rule on electoral issues. It is based in Nicosia and is composed of 7 judges, one of whom acts as the court president. Supreme Court Judges are appointed by the President of the Republic on the recommendation of the Supreme Court and retire at the age of 68.

Due to the constitutional crisis of 1963 and the Turkish invasion of 1974, the judicial system deviates from the system set forth in the Constitution. The Supreme Court has absorbed the responsibilities of the Constitutional Supreme Court and the High Court and therefore acts as the ultimate authority in civil, criminal, administrative, and constitutional matters. This allows the court to rule on both the constitutionality of the law, with individual constitutional complaints and with appeals from lower courts.

The Republic of Cyprus became an independent sovereign republic with a presidential system on August 16, 1960. Before 1960, Cyprus was considered a Crown colony of the United Kingdom and was governed by English common law. As an independent republic, Cyprus drafted a new constitution and ordered the Supreme Court to adopt English case law. However, the Supreme Court rejected this request and, in 1962, adopted the position that English case law did not have binding authority. Instead, the court ruled that it would follow English case law as it "be suitable for Cyprus."

In 2023, a judicial reform created the Supreme Constitutional Court separated from the Supreme Court. The reform took effect on 1 July 2023, when a three-tier structure began operating. A new Court of Appeal, created by Law 145(I)/2022, took over second-instance civil and criminal appeals. The Supreme Court retained third-instance civil and criminal appeals (by leave), prerogative writs and pending legacy appeals, while constitutional matters passed to the Supreme Constitutional Court under Law 103(I)/2022. Before the reform, a single Supreme Court sat with thirteen judges.

== Composition since 2023 ==
- Katerina Stamatiou, president
- Charis Malachtos
- Lena Demetriadou-Andreou
- Ioannis Ioannides
- Elena Efrem
- Angelos David
- Alexandros Panayiotou

== See also ==
- Judiciary of Cyprus
