= Eastern Orthodoxy in Ghana =

Eastern Orthodoxy in Ghana refers to adherents and religious communities of Eastern Orthodox Christianity in Ghana. Majority of Eastern Orthodox Christians in Ghana are under ecclesiastical jurisdiction of the Eastern Orthodox Patriarchate of Alexandria and all Africa.

== History ==
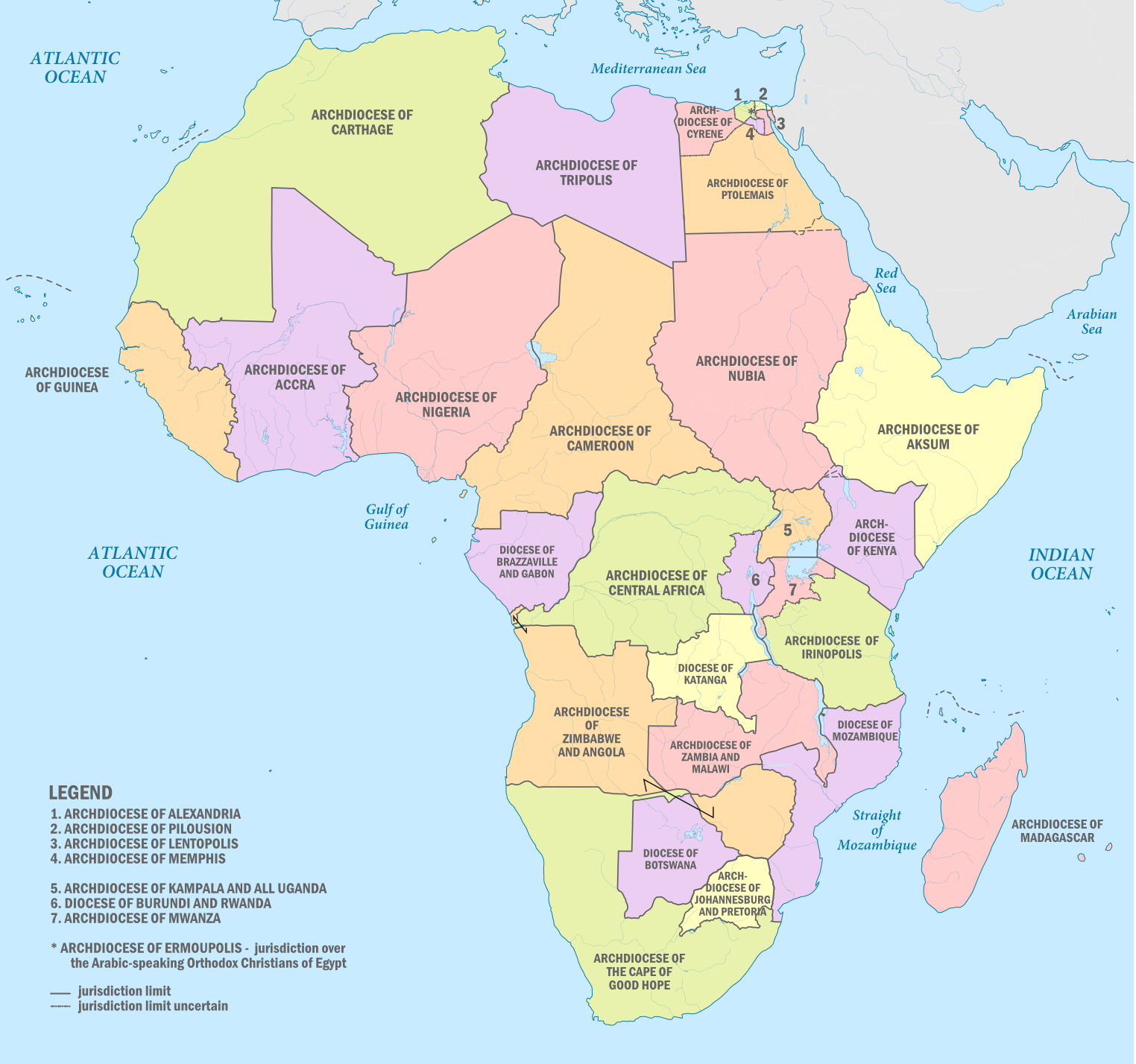
Archdioceses and Dioceses of the Eastern Orthodox Patriarchate of Alexandria and all Africa

Eastern Orthodoxy emerged in Ghana in 1932, but without official canonical sanction. The "African Universal Orthodox-Catholic Church" was organized by the charismatic African Bresi-Ando, but he and his followers vaguely knew the meaning of the term "Orthodoxy", and tried to find the true church. In 1972, Godfried Mantey and Kwame Joseph Labi, two of the church's youth leaders, read "The Orthodox Church" by Timothy Kallistos Ware which strengthened their church's religious quest.

Two years later, Mantey and Labi met personally with representatives of the Eastern Orthodox world, and on 15 January 1978, Metropolitan Irineos, Metropolitan of Accra and All West Africa, (within the Patriarchate of Alexandria), made his first visit to the faithful of Ghana. By September 1982, the organization was officially admitted into the Eastern Orthodox communion within the Patriarchal Throne of Alexandria and All Africa. Now there is active missionary work, led by a resident archbishop. Thousands of Eastern Orthodox Christians from among the local population are served by 23 priests. A local Eastern Orthodox seminary is now open in Ghana.

== See also ==
- Eastern Orthodox Patriarchate of Alexandria and all Africa

== Sources ==
- The article was translated from Russian article Православие в Гане, where sources for the data are stated.
- Corrections came from "A Brief History of the Orthodox Church in Ghana", the U.S. Fulbright research project of Andrew J. Anderson, available at the Orthodox Research Institute website.
