= Kevin Bailey (poet) =

English poet

Kevin Bailey (born 16 March 1954) is a British poet and founder of HQ Poetry Magazine. He has had six collections of poetry published and co-edited an anthology of poetry for the Acorn Book Company in 2000. He was born and grew up at Wallingford, in the County of Berkshire (now Oxfordshire), England, where he attended the local grammar school. He was later educated at the University of York and University College, Bath.

== Early life ==
=== Background ===
In 1990, Bailey founded the literary journal HQ Poetry Magazine, which he still edits and publishes independently. He has been involved in the work of London's poetry group "Piccadilly Poets" and The Live Poet's Society in Bath. In 2000, he edited (with Lucien Stryk) the anthology Contemporary Haiku. Since 2001, Bailey has co-organised and judged the annual Poetry on the Lake festival held at Orta San Giulio in Italy. In 2004, Bailey adjudicated the Sasakawa Prize for Haikai. His poetry and commentaries have appeared in a variety of publications. Originally trained as a psychologist, he is now a self-supporting writer and lives in Wroughton, Wiltshire.

He was a judge for The Silver Wyvern, the annual award of the Poetry on the Lake festival held at Lake Orta, Italy, in 2004, 2005, and 2013. A dedicated amateur astronomer, he was elected a Fellow of the Royal Astronomical Society in July 2013. In 2014, he became the Uranus Coordinator of the Saturn Section of the British Astronomical Association (BAA), and in 2023 an assistant director of the BAA's new Saturn, Uranus and Neptune Section.

== Books ==
- Surviving Love (2005), Bluechrome Publishing. ISBN 1-904781-53-5
- Poems and Translations (1987), Day Dream P. ISBN 1-870294-00-9
- The Acorn Book of Contemporary Haiku (2000), Acorn Book Company (ed. with Lucien Stryk). ISBN 0-9534205-2-3
- Prospero's Mantle (2006), Bluechrome Publishing. ISBN 1-904781-78-0
- Misericord or The Strange Poetry of Kevin Bailey (2019), Dempsey and Windle. ISBN 978-1-907435-99-7
- By The Way – Collected Haiku (2023), Red Moon Press. ISBN 978-1-958408-20-9
- Freud's Graffiti – Collected Poems 1974-2024 (2025), Day Dream Press/Stravaigers. ISBN 978-1-916478-92-3
