= Rina Katselli =

Cypriot politician (1938–2021)

Personal details
- Born: 1938 Kyrenia, Cyprus
- Died: 28 May 2021 (aged 82–83)

Rina Katselli (1938 – 28 May 2021) was a writer and politician from Cyprus. She is considered one of the most important contemporary Cypriot playwrights and prose writers. In 1981, she became the first Greek Cypriot woman to serve in Cyprus' House of Representatives.

Katselli's work frequently drew on her experience of displacement from her home region of Kyrenia after the 1974 Turkish invasion of Cyprus, including in her widely translated 1978 novel Galazia falaina.

== Biography ==
Katselli was born Rina Charalambidis in 1938 in Kyrenia, in the northern part of the island of Cyprus.

After she finished high school in the late 1950s, she joined the ranks of EOKA, a Greek Cypriot nationalist guerrilla organization that opposed British rule of the island. During her time with EOKA, she was imprisoned for a month by the British authorities. The organization disbanded in 1959, and after Cyprus gained independence the following year, she married and had children with fellow political activist Stelios Katsellis—to whom she was married until 1993—while continuing her writing career.

In 1974, after the Turkish invasion of Cyprus, Katselli left her home in the newly occupied territory, settling first in Limassol and eventually in Nicosia. This displacement would become a central theme in her work.

She died in May 2021 at the age of 83.

== Career ==
=== Writing ===
Katselli became involved in amateur theater in 1958, directing and acting in Molière's Le Bourgeois Gentilhomme in Kyrenia. The following year, she wrote and performed in her first play. She would go on to write nearly three dozen plays in the period from 1959 to 2010, as well as short radio and TV dramas. Her work began to gain greater recognition, with her play O anaxios being staged by the Cyprus Organization for Theatrical Development in 1962. In 1970, a seven-volume collection of her plays up to that point was published under the title Ten Years of Theatre 1959-1969.

In 1973, Katselli founded the publishing house Chryssopolitissa. After she left Kyrenia the following year, the Theatrical Organization of Cyprus in Nicosia staged several of her plays, including Xeniteia and I treli giagia. Her work has also been performed by Theatro Ena and Italy's Accademia Nazionale di Arte Drammatica Silvio D'Amico.

Katselli also wrote nine novels, the best-known of which is 1978's Galazia falaina. Her work was frequently inspired by Cyprus' history and folk tradition, and she wrote both social drama and satire.

In 2017, her book Prosfugas ston topo mou was published in English translation by Armida Publications as Kyrenia's Legend: The Life and Time of Costas Catsellis. Other works available in English translation include the novel Galazia falaina, translated as Blue Whale, and her memoir Refugee in My Homeland: Cyprus 1974.

=== Politics ===
Katselli's introduction to politics was through her work with the guerrilla group EOKA in the late 1950s. However, she entered the political scene in earnest after the 1974 invasion and her displacement from her home province of Kyrenia.

From 1981 to 1996 she served as representative-in-exile for Kyrenia in the Cyprus House of Representatives, making her the country's first Greek Cypriot woman to become a member of parliament, following Turkish Cypriot Ayla Halit Kazım in 1963. She served in the House of Representatives as a member of the centrist Democratic Party.
