= Antonella Mantovani =

Cypriot politician

- Born: September 7, 1971 (age 54); Limassol, Cyprus
- Occupations: Tourism professional, MEP

Antonella Mantovani (born 7 September 1971 in Limassol), is a Latin Cypriot tourism professional and a member of the House of Representatives. Her mother is of Armenian background and her father is of Italian background. She got her bachelor's on Foreign Languages and History from the Cambridge University and her master's on European Politics and Administration from the College of Europe in Belgium. In 2016, she was elected to the House of Representatives as a representative of the Latin religious group. In the House, she is a member of the House Standing Committee on Educational Affairs and Culture.
