= Melissa Hekkers =

Melissa Hekkers (born 1981) is a Belgian journalist, author, translator and humanitarian based in Nicosia, Cyprus. She is known for her children's literature, creative nonfiction, and educational colouring books that explore the cultural and natural heritage of Cyprus. Her work often addresses themes related to silenced communities, migration, and environmental awareness.

== Early life and education ==
Melissa Hekkers was born in Brussels, Belgium in 1981. She has a BA in Communications at Intercollege.

== Career ==
Hekkers began writing for local Newspapers, including the Cyprus Mail Newspaper and the Cyprus Weekly Newspaper as well other publications in Cyprus in the early 2000s. Since 2015, Hekkers has been teaching creative writing to children and adults.

She also focuses on silenced communities in Cyprus: she writes about migrants, both as a reporter and an author; creates audiovisual exhibitions to raise awareness on minorities, teaches creative and script writing skills through European-funded programmes and internationally recognised humanitarian organisations such as UNHCR.

Following her involvement in migration and volunteering in Lesbos, Greece in 2020, she published her first creative non-fiction, Amir's Blue Elephant (Τι Θα’λεγε η Μεσόγειος). The book is a tribute to the difficulties faced by peoples on the move, and Hekkers used it to advocate for refugee and asylum-seeking communities, including through a TEDx talk at TEDx Nicosia

== Selected distinctions ==
- Crocodile/ Κροκόδειλος, illustrated by visual artist Anna Fotiadou, her first book was awarded the Cyprus State Illustration Award in 2007.
- Flying across Red Skies, an experimental approach to literature based on paintings by Cypriot artist Marlen Karletidou, was nominated for the Cyprus State Literary award 2012.
- Pupa/Πουπα, illustrated by Louiza Kaimaki, was commented by the Cyprus Ministry of Culture and Education in the Literature Awards 2014 and adapted as a theatre play in 2019, directed by Christos Yiangou.
- My Cyprus Mandala, a three part series of colouring books focusing on the natural and cultural heritage of Cyprus. The series explores the island's historical and cultural richness through the art of mandala creation, colouring and facts. The books have been used as an educational tool in both school and private workshops for children and are presented as calming and mindful activities suitable for all ages, raising awareness of Cypriot heritage.

== Selected publications ==
- 2007 Crocodile/ Κροκόδειλος, Pantheon Cultural Association (Cyprus) ISBN 9789963864430
- 2012 Flying across Red Skies/ Πετώντας σε Κόκκινους Ουρανούς, Pantheon Cultural Association (Cyprus). ISBN 9789963864492
- 2014 Pupa/Πουπα, Pantheon Cultural Association (Cyprus) Pantheon Cultural Association (Cyprus). ISBN 9789963978946
- My Nicosia Mandala, Bookworm Publication (Cyprus). ISBN 9789963268030
- My Akamas Mandala, Bookworm Publication (Cyprus). ISBN 9789963268061
- 2018 My Cape Greco Mandala, Bookworm Publication (Cyprus). ISBN 9789963268092
- 2020 Amir's Blue Elephant/ Τι Θα’λεγε η Μεσόγειος, Armida Books (Cyprus) ISBN 9789925573318
