= Poetry on the Lake =

Poetry on the Lake is the event founded in 2001 by the director and organizer Gabriel Griffin, the seat is on Isola di San Giulio. Since 2001 Kevin Bailey has co-organised and judged at the annual Poetry on the Lake festival held at Orta San Giulio in Italy, the antique island on Lake Orta, northern Italy. Annual events include the spring international poetry competition (prizes are donated by Alessi) and the autumn celebration described by the British Poet Laureate Carol Ann Duffy on the South Bank Show, ITV, 6 December 2009 as: "...perhaps the smallest but possibly the most perfect poetry festival in the world". Events take place on the island, in the square of Orta, on Sacro Monte in the woods around the chapels, in the historic palaces (Palazzo Ubertini, Villa Bossi) on board ship ('una barca di poeti'- a poetic cruise), in the neighbouring towns and villages: Omegna, Orta, Pella, Varallo, Invorio and Ameno.

== Events ==
Poetry events: competition, readings, workshops, discussions, dance and music that take place on and around Lake Orta in the foothills of the Alps.

== Poets ==
Poetry on the Lake poets include: Al Alvarez, Kevin Bailey, Gary Bills, Carole Baldock, Massimo Bocchiolo, Gillian Clarke (Welsh National Poet), Imtiaz Dharker, John F. Deane (founder of Poetry Ireland), Carol Ann Duffy (British Poet Laureate and patron of Poetry on the Lake), James Harpur, John Hartley Williams, Christopher North, Brian Patten, Don Paterson, Jo Shapcott, Penelope Shuttle, Michael Swan, D.M.Thomas, Francesca Diano, Italian poet, translator and writer and the poet and British Consul General Laurence Bristow-Smith.

== Where it is featured ==
Poetry on the Lake is the only celebration in a guide book to Italy (The Purple Guide to Piedmont and North Italy) also featured in: The South Bank Show, 6 December 2009, Channel One, ITV Other TV transmissions featuring Poetry on the Lake: MagicaItalia (Rai 1, May 2011) and Mixitalia (Rai 1, May 2012). The Guardian (Travel) 9 March 2012. Poetry on the Lake also edits annual anthologies and a journal.

== See also ==
- http://www.poetryonthelake.org
- https://www.youtube.com/watch?v=YZPLIg5tFI8
