= Ino Nicolaou =

Cypriot archaeologist, epigraphist, and numismatist (1929–2018)

- Ινώ Νικολάου
- Born: 1929; Limassol, British Cyprus
- Died: 31 January 2018 (aged 88–89); Limassol, Cyprus
- Education: University of Athens; University of St. Andrews; University of Gothenburg
- Spouse: Kyriakos Nicolaou
- Scientific career
- Fields: Epigraphy; Numismatics; Archaeology
- Thesis: Prosopography of Ptolemaic Cyprus (1976)

Ino Nicolaou (née Michaelidou) (Greek: Ινώ Νικολάου) (1929, Limassol - 31 January 2018, Limassol) was a Cypriot archaeologist, epigraphist and numismatist that worked for the Department of Antiquities. Her contributions to all her fields spanned six decades.

== Education and Archaeological career ==
Nicolaou was born in Limassol in 1929. She studied classical philology at the University of Athens. For some years she worked as a school teacher in secondary education. Then she continued her studies at the University of St. Andrews under Terence Mitford with a scholarship from the British Council, specializing in Greek and Latin epigraphy. In 1976 she earned her doctorate degree from the University of Gothenburg, with her thesis titled Prosopography of Ptolemaic Cyprus. As a student she excavated with Ioannis Threpsiades at Kerameikos and the Pnyx in Athens and with Kazimierz Michałowski at Palmyra in Syria.

She worked at the Department of Antiquities from 1960 until 1989, retiring as an Archaeological Officer A, in her 29 years working with the Department, she excavated at the House of Dionysos in Paphos with Kyriakos Nicolaou, at the 'Commissariato' of Limassol, the Eastern necropolis of Amathous and the locality Phoinikas of Evrychou.

She is noted for publishing a large number of Cypriot alphabetic inscriptions in a series known as Inscriptiones Cypriae Alphabeticae which she started in 1963, as well as her contributions to the prosopography of Hellenistic Cyprus and Cypriot numismatics of various periods. In 2009 she was elected as an Honorary Member of the International Numismatic Council. She was the correspondent for Cyprus for the Association Internationale pour l'Étude de la Mosaique Antique (AIEMA). She is a member of the Archaeological Society of Athens, the Society of Byzantine Studies, a corresponding member of the German Archaeological Institute.

== Personal life ==
Ino was married to another Cypriot archaeologist, Kyriakos Nicolaou. In 2016 she donated their archive of 10,000 books, journals, maps, photographs and other material to the University of Cyprus.

== Publications ==
- Nicolaou, I. (1965). Table à jeu de Dhekeleia (Chypre). Bulletin de Correspondance Hellénique, 89(1), 122-127.
- Nicolaou, I. (1970). Une nouvelle table à jeu de Chypre. Bulletin de Correspondance Hellénique, 94(2), 549-550.
- Nicolaou, I. (1971). Cypriot Inscribed Stones.
- Nicolaou, I. & Mitford, L. (1974). Inscriptions from Salamis.
- Nicolaou, I. (1976). Prosopography of Ptolemaic Cyprus.
- Nicolaou, I. & Morkholm, O. (1976). Paphos I, a Ptolemaic Coin Hoard.
- Nicolaou, I., & Empereur, J. Y. (1986). Amphores Rhodiennes du Musée de Nicosie. In: Empereur & Garlan (eds.), Recherches sur les amphores grecques. Suppléments au Bulletin de Correspondance Hellénique, 13, 513-533.
- Nicolaou, I. (1989). Acteurs et grotesques de Chypre. In: Architecture et poésie dans le monde grec. Hommage à Georges Roux. Lyon: Maison de l'Orient et de la Méditerranée Jean Pouilloux, 269-284.
- Nicolaou, I. (1989). Les bouillottes thérapeutiques de Paphos et leurs parallèles hors de Chypre. Bulletin de correspondance hellénique, 113(1), 301-318.
- Nicolaou, I. (1990). The Jewellery of Cyprus from Neolithic to Roman times. Archaeologia Cypria II: In honour of K. Nicolaou, 117-120.
- Nicolaou, I. (1993). Nouveaux documents pour le syllabaire chypriote. Bulletin de correspondance hellénique, 117(1), 343-347.

== See more ==
- Olivier Masson
