= Nora Nadjarian =

Armenian-Cypriot poet and writer (born 1966)

- Born: 1966 (age 59–60); Limassol, Cyprus
- Occupations: Writer, teacher, advisory editor
- Writing career
- Literary movement: Post-colonialism
- Website: www.noranadjarian.com

Nora Nadjarian (born 1966) is an Armenian–Cypriot poet and short story writer. Writing in English, Armenian, and Greek, Nadjarian's writing has focused on the continued fallout of the 1974 partition of Cyprus.

A frequent participant in international competitions, poetry festivals, literary conferences and other projects, her poems and short stories have also appeared in numerous anthologies around the world.

She has said that her work is inspired by Sylvia Plath and Yehuda Amichai and also mentioned Paul Celan, Pablo Neruda and Sharon Olds as a few other idols.

== Biography ==
Nadjarian was born in 1966 in Limassol, a city on the southern coast of Cyprus, to parents who worked in the production of fabrics. She is the second generation to be born in Cyprus after her Armenian refugee grandparents moved to Cyprus at the beginning of the 20th century. She first attended an Armenian elementary school, then moved to Foley's Grammar School, a private British school, where she graduated from. Nadjarian then earned a degree from the department of modern languages and linguistics at Manchester University. Upon graduating from Manchester, Nadjarian returned to Cyprus and began teaching in Limassol and then in Nicosia, where she is currently residing.

She visited her ancestral homeland of Armenia in 1983 which inspired her to write poems based on ethnic identity, cultural self-discovery, her Armenian roots and the tragic fate of the nation. She first decided to participate in a competition because of the encouragements of a friend, and after being acknowledged for her poem "Vinegar" (1999–2000) she continued to take part in numerous international competitions.

== Critical review ==
Nora Nadjarian has received international praise for her work, particularly that focused on the Cyprus partition of 1974, identity and loss. She has described her work as "political without being polemical" and has written of an ongoing battle in both the physical sense and mind inside the Cypriot heart that is defined by the division in Nicosia between the Greek Cypriot and Turkish Cypriot sides of the island without taking on a side. She condemns the conflict itself, not the people. Her work is read beyond the Mediterranean borders and can very much be identified with in its search to find what defines one's nationality.

Other reviews can be found at:

- The Guardian
- Cadences

William Macfarlane, review of Nora Nadjarian, Girl, Wolf, Bones (2011), in Cadences 8 (2012), 110–111.

== Works ==
=== Poetry ===
- The Voice at the Top of the Stairs: Selected Poems (Gitano Publications, 2001)
- Cleft in Twain (2003)
- 25 Ways to Kiss a Man (2004)
- Iktsuarpok (Broken Sleep Books, 2023)

=== Short story collections ===
- Ledra Street (Armida Books, 2006)
- Selfie and Other Stories (ROMAN Books, 2017)

=== Chapbooks ===
- Republic of Love (BluePrintPress, 2010)
- Girl, Wolf, Bones (Folded Word Chapbooks, 2011)

=== Other Works (Short Stories and Poems) ===
- “Three Facts” (2001)
- “When You Return to Ashtarak" (2005)
- "The Young Soldier" (2006)
- “Impossible” (2006)
- “Diaspora” (2008) – Translated to Armenian by Maggie Eskidjian
- “Flying with Chagall” (2009) – Inspired by Marc Chagall's Above the Town (1915)
- “Blue Pear” (2009)
- “Miracle” (2010)
- “The Cheque Republic” (2010)
- “Lizard” (2010) – Included in Valentine’s Day Massacre (2011), edited by Susan Tepper
- “Sparrow” (2010) – Shortlisted in the Seán Ó Faoláin Short Story Competition Prize
- “A Christmas Surprise” (2010)
- “Monday” (2011)
- “The Name” (2012)
- "The Girl and the Rain" in Pachydermini 5 (Turtleneck Press, 2012)
- “The Author and the Girl” (2013)
- “Wanderlust” (2013) – Included in The Limerick Writers’ Centre themed Love anthology (2013), published in Ireland
- “Waterfall” – Inspired by Arshile Gorky's The Waterfall (1943)
- “Exhibition” – Included in Best European Fiction (2011), edited by Aleksander Hemon

Many of her poems can be read online through her blog, and some can even be listened to on Lyrikline.

== Awards ==
Nora Nadjarian was among the winners in the Scottish International Open Poetry Competition in 2000 with her poem "Vinegar", and in 2003 with "Conception". Furthermore, she was awarded prizes at the Manifold Art and Artists Poetry Competition in 2003, at the Féile Filíochta International Poetry Competition in 2005 in Ireland and at the Poetry on the Lake competition also in 2005. Her short story “Ledra Street” was a runner-up in the Commonwealth Short Story Competition (2001). The poems "The Butcher" and "The Tenderness of Miniature Shampoo Bottles" were shortlisted in the Plough Arts Centre Poetry Competition (2003) and were displayed at the Centre in Devon, England, in January 2004. "And the Seven Dwarves" has been honoured in the Sixth Annual International Ultra-Short Competition (2008–2009), while "Tell Me Words" has been commended in the Ninth Annual International Ultra-Short Competition (2011–2012); events that are sponsored by The Binnacle at the University of Maine at Machias. Finally, “The Name” won in the unFold 2012 Poetry Garden Show competition.

== Interviews ==
- Article title
- http://fictiondaily.org/author-interviews/nora-nadjarian/

Author Talk

- http://dailyspress.blogspot.com/2009/10/author-talk-michael-k-white-nora.html

== Bibliography ==
- Nora Nadjarian, Cleft in Twain (Nicosia: J. G. Cassoulides & Son Ltd, 2003), Foreword.
- "Poetry (Cyprus)", Encyclopedia of Post-Colonial Literatures in English, ed. by Eugene Benson and L. W. Conolly, 1994, pp. 1243 – 1244.
- William Macfarlane, review of Nora Nadjarian, Girl, Wolf, Bones (2011), in Cadences 8 (2012), 110–111.
