= Katerina Stamatiou =

Cypriot judge (born 1960)

- Κατερίνα Σταματίου

President of the Supreme Court of Cyprus
- Incumbent
- Assumed office 1 July 2023
- Preceded by: Antonis R. Liatsos

Justice of the Supreme Court of Cyprus
- Incumbent
- Assumed office 16 September 2013

Personal details
- Born: 1960 (age 65–66) Limassol, Cyprus
- Children: 2
- Education: Gray's Inn

Katerina Stamatiou (Greek: Κατερίνα Σταματίου; born 1960) is a Cypriot judge. She has been justice of the Supreme Court of Cyprus since 2013 and its president since 2023.

== Career ==
Stamatiou was born in Limassol, Cyprus, in 1960. She graduated in law in London, United Kingdom, and was admitted to the bar at Gray's Inn.

She returned to Cyprus and worked at a law firm in Limassol, she was also a member of the Limassol Bar Association, until 1993 when she was appointed district judge. In 2000, Stamatiou became a senior district judge, and in 2004, she was promoted to district court president. She presided over the Assize Court of Paphos and Limassol and served as Administrative President of the Paphos and Limassol District Courts.

On 16 September 2013, Stamatiou was appointed justice of the Supreme Court of Cyprus. In December 2022, following the approval of the Supreme Court and Constitutional Court reform, President Nikos Anastasiadis appointed Stamatiou as president of the Supreme Court, and she began her term on 1 July 2023. She advocates for the modernization and improvement of the efficiency of the Cypriot judicial system and promotes the introduction of modern data processing for the judiciary.

== Personal life ==
She is married and has two children.
