= Artemis Spyrou =

Experimental nuclear astrophysicist

- Artemisia Spyrou
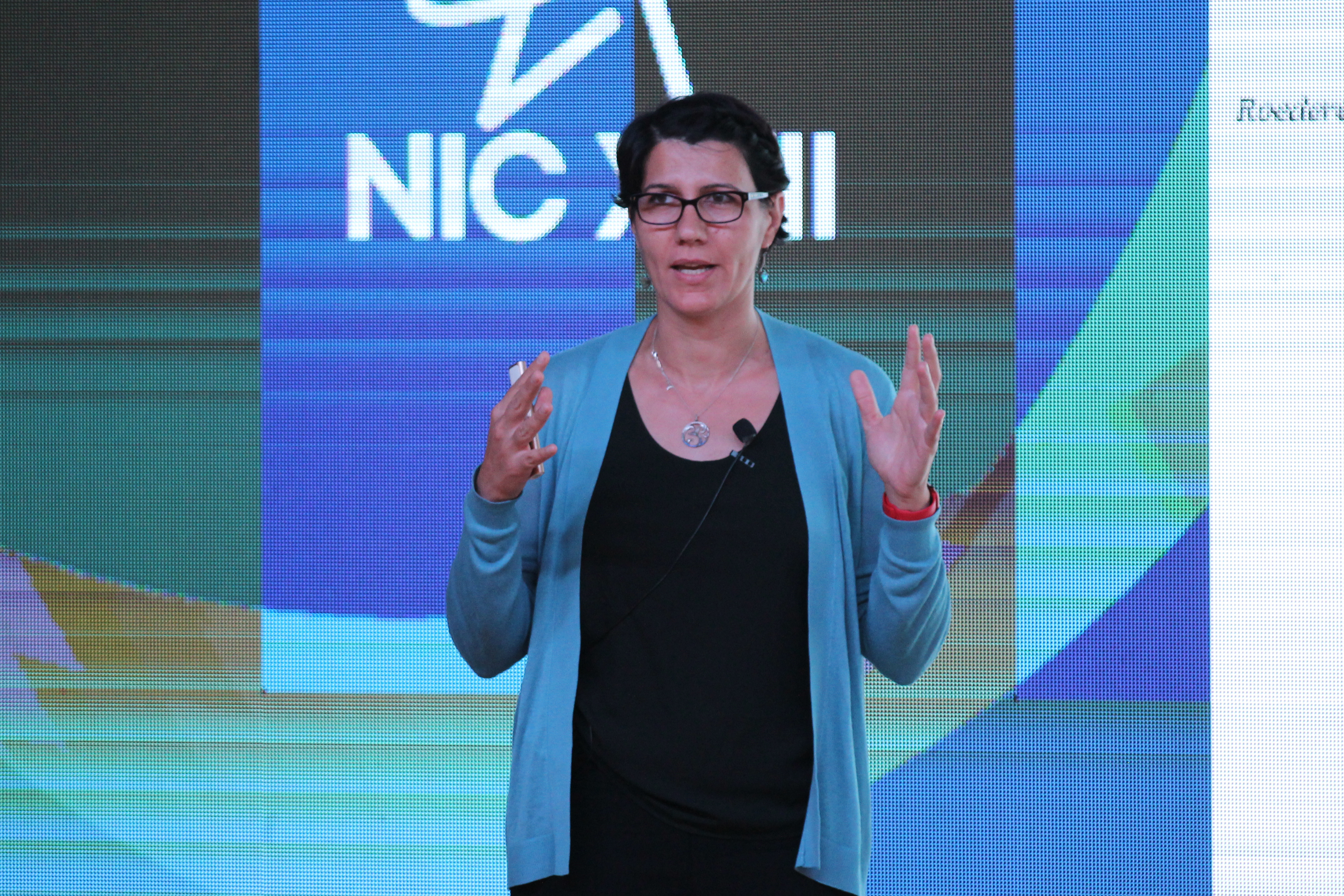
- Education: National (Metsovian) Technical University of Athens
- Awards: National Science Foundation CAREER Awards
- Scientific career
- Fields: Nuclear astrophysics, Nuclear Physics
- Workplaces: Michigan State University, National Superconducting Cyclotron Laboratory
- Website: https://www.nscl.msu.edu/directory/spyrou.html

Artemisia (Artemis) Spyrou is a Cypriot experimental nuclear astrophysicist and professor at Michigan State University. She is also the Associate Director for Education and Outreach at the National Superconducting Cyclotron Laboratory. She was the recipient of a NSF CAREER Award.

== Early life and education ==
Spyrou was born in Limassol, Cyprus. She received an undergraduate degree in physics from the Aristotle University of Thessaloniki in 2001 and a master's degree in physics from the National Technical University of Athens in 2003. She received a PhD from the Institute of Nuclear Physics of the National Centre of Scientific Research "Demokritos" and National Technical University of Athens in 2007, where she studied experimental nuclear astrophysics using the Dynamitron Tandem Laboratory (DTL) at the University of Bochum.

== Research ==
Spyrou is an experimental physicist who uses the isotope beams at the National Superconducting Cyclotron Laboratory to study how the elements are made in the universe. With particular regard to the r-process and s-process of neutron capture. By analyzing the resulting beta-decay from neutron capture reactions using the SuN Detector with techniques developed by her group.

== Recognition ==
In 2011, Spyrou was awarded the Thomas H. Osgood Faculty Teaching Award from the department of Physics and Astronomy at Michigan State University for her dedication to undergraduate education in the department. She was also featured on an episode of PBS Curious Crew.

In 2021, she was named a Fellow of the American Physical Society (APS), after a nomination from the APS Division of Nuclear Physics, "for studies using total absorption spectroscopy and the beta-Oslo technique to determine neutron-capture rates for astrophysical modeling, and for dedication to communicating science to the general public".

== Selected works ==
- Spyrou, A.; Kohley, Z.; Baumann, T.; Bazin, D.; Brown, B. A.; Christian, G.; DeYoung, P. A.; Finck, J. E.; Frank, N.; Lunderberg, E.; Mosby, S.; Peters, W. A.; Schiller, A.; Smith, J. K.; Snyder, J.; Strongman, M. J.; Thoennessen, M.; Volya, A. (9 March 2012). "First Observation of Ground State Dineutron Decay: $^{16}\mathrm{Be}$". Physical Review Letters. 108 (10) 102501. doi:10.1103/PhysRevLett.108.102501. PMID 22463404.
- Lunderberg, E.; DeYoung, P. A.; Kohley, Z.; Attanayake, H.; Baumann, T.; Bazin, D.; Christian, G.; Divaratne, D.; Grimes, S. M.; Haagsma, A.; Finck, J. E.; Frank, N.; Luther, B.; Mosby, S.; Nagi, T.; Peaslee, G. F.; Schiller, A.; Snyder, J.; Spyrou, A.; Strongman, M. J.; Thoennessen, M. (6 April 2012). "Evidence for the Ground-State Resonance of $^{26}\mathbf{O}$". Physical Review Letters. 108 (14) 142503. arXiv:1202.3973. doi:10.1103/PhysRevLett.108.142503.
- Spyrou, A.; Liddick, S. N.; Larsen, A. C.; Guttormsen, M.; Cooper, K.; Dombos, A. C.; Morrissey, D. J.; Naqvi, F.; Perdikakis, G.; Quinn, S. J.; Renstrøm, T.; Rodriguez, J. A.; Simon, A.; Sumithrarachchi, C. S.; Zegers, R. G. T. (5 December 2014). "Novel technique for constraining r-process (n, γ) reaction rates". Physical Review Letters. 113 (23) 232502. arXiv:1408.6498. Bibcode:2014PhRvL.113w2502S. doi:10.1103/PhysRevLett.113.232502. ISSN 1079-7114. PMID 25526121.
