= Pitsa Galazi =

Pitsa Galazi (Real name:Calliope Morton; 1940 – 14 February 2023) was an essayist, poet, and broadcaster from Cyprus. She published multiple books of poetry between the 1960s and the 1990s.

== Life ==
She was born in Limassol, and spent much of her childhood in Paleochori. In the adolescent age she was a member of EOKA. She later went to Athens where she studied political science at Panteion University.

== Career ==
She has worked professionally as a radio producer at the Cyprus Radio Foundation. She was a journalist and editor in newspapers and magazines of literary and philological content.

=== Literature ===
During her studies in Greece, Galazi published her first poetry collection in 1963, entitled "Moments of Adolescence" (Fexis Publications). Her other works are "Trees and the Sea" (1969), "Alexander's Sister" (1973), "Hypnotherapy" (1978), "Flags" (1983), "The Birds of Eustolus and the Enclosed" (1999), "The Voice" (2018) etc. She has been awarded three times with the State Prize for Literature of the Republic of Cyprus (1969, 1983 and 2018), while in 1999 he was honored with the Poetry Prize of the Academy of Athens . Poems have been translated into different languages (English, French, Spanish, German, Italian, etc.)
