= Makarios Tillyrides =

Greek Orthodox bishop

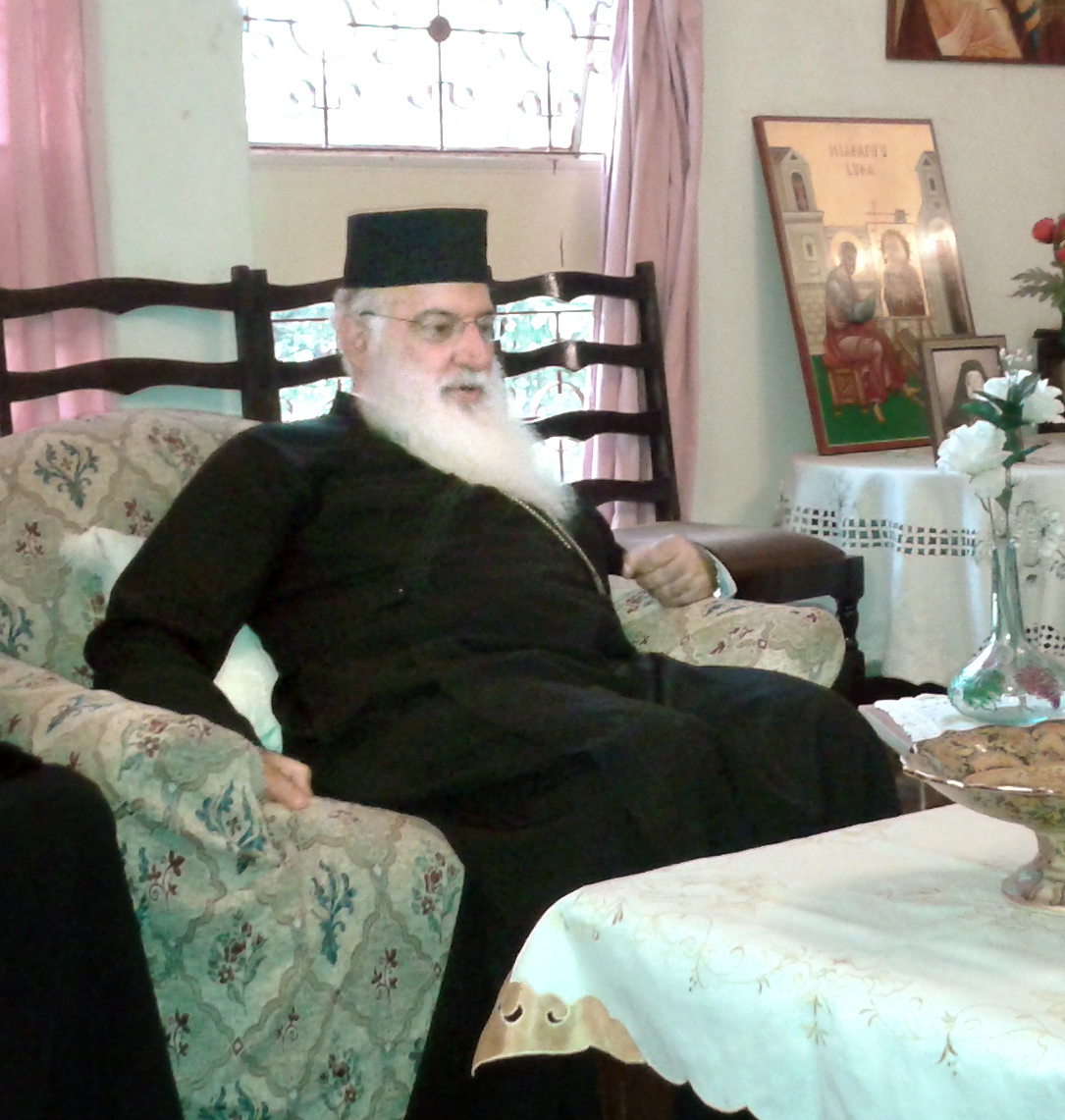
Makarios (2014)

Metropolitan Makarios (Greek: Μητροπολίτης Μακάριος, born Andreas Tillyrides, Greek: Ανδρέας Τηλυρίδης, 18 April 1945, Limassol) is a Cypriot bishop of the Greek Orthodox Church of Alexandria. Since 2001 he has been Archbishop of Nairobi.

== Biography ==
Andreas Tillyrides was born in 1945 in Limassol, Cyprus. He studied from 1968 to 1972 at the St. Sergius Orthodox Theological Institute, while studying in the Collège de France and the École Pratique des Hautes Études, afterwards pursuing post-graduation in Church History at Oxford University under Kallistos Ware, receiving a DPhil in 1976. In the following year, under Archbishop Makarios III's orientation, Andreas went to Nairobi to organise an Orthodox seminary. In 1992, he was tonsured a monk under the name Makarios and subsequently ordained a priest and consecrated first and last Bishop of Riruta by then Metropolitan Peter of Axum and Bishop Theodore of Uganda. He was made Archbishop of Zimbabwe in 1998 and, finally, Archbishop of Nairobi in 2001.

Archbishop Makarios can speak, apart from his native Greek, English, French, Russian, Italian, plus several African dialects. Under his direction, the Orthodox Church has translated liturgical texts even to some dialects that had never been written before. Under his direction, the two first native bishops were consecrated: Athanasius (Akunda) of Kisumu and All Western Kenya on 2015 and Bishop Neophytos (Kongai) of Nyeri and Mt. Kenya on 2016.
