= Stavros V. Kyriakides =

- Σταύρος Β. Κυριακίδης
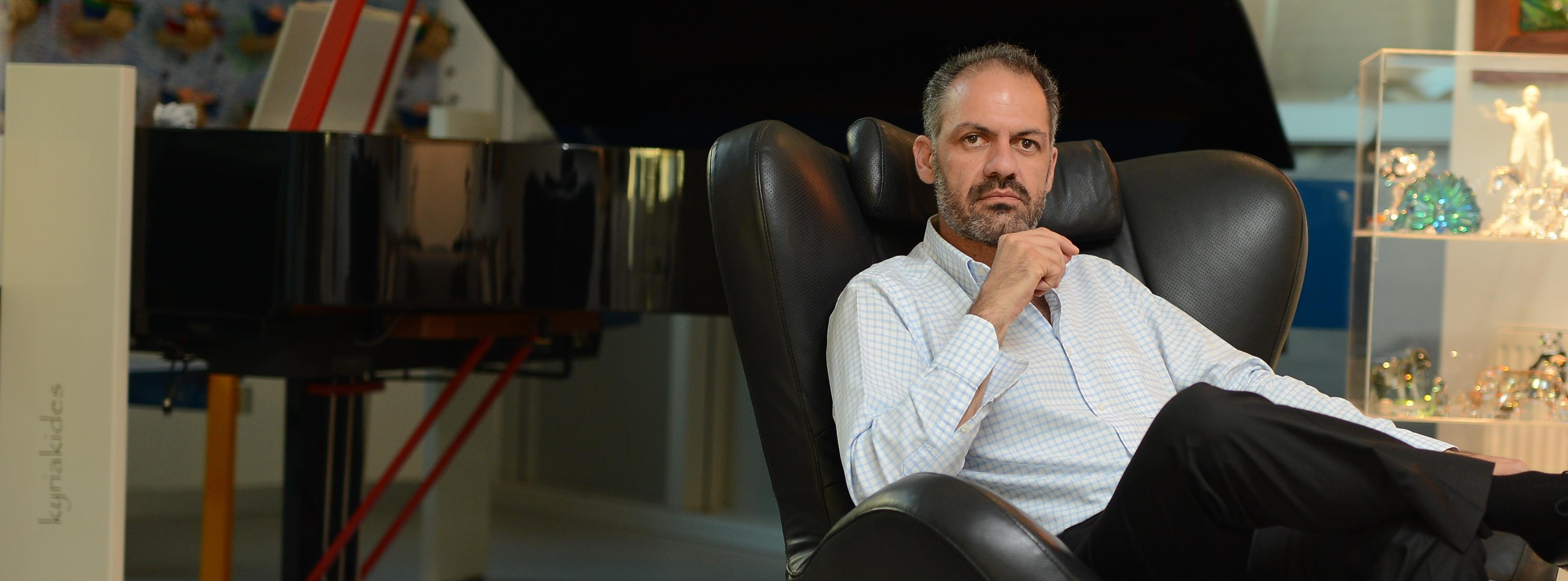
- Born: 18 October 1971 (age 53); Limassol, Cyprus
- Website: Kyriakides Piano Gallery

Stavros V. Kyriakides (Greek: Σταύρος Β. Κυριακίδης; born 18 October 1971) is a Cypriot businessman and a cultural manager; managing director of Kyriakides Piano Gallery (SVK Pianotech Ltd), President of Avantgarde Cultural Foundation and President of the Cultural Institute.

== Education ==
Kyriakides holds a Masters of Arts degree (MA) in "Cultural Policy and Development" with distinction. He has studied “Stringed Keyboard Instrument Technology” in Edinburgh, Scotland, and “Piano Technology” in two different establishments of the USA. He attended the famed C. F. Theodore Steinway School for Concert Technicians in Hamburg, Germany, and holds the prestigious “Steinway Concert Technician” title.

Kyriakides is an individual member of the International Association of Piano Builders and Technicians (to which members are national associations and only on rare occasions individuals are allowed to join) and has been an associate member of the Piano Tuners Association (UK) and the Piano Technicians Guild (USA).

== Career ==
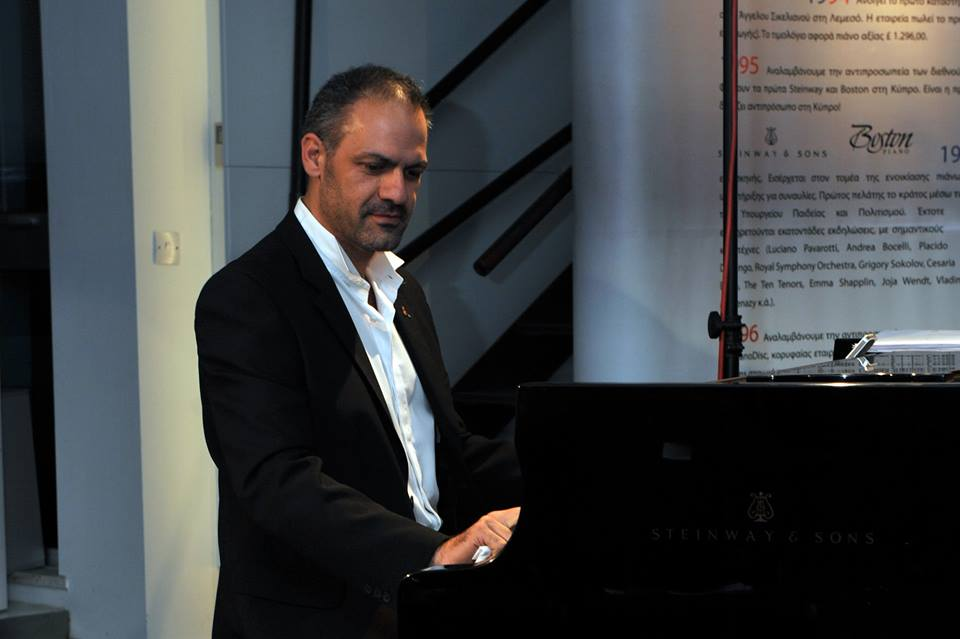
Stavros V. Kyriakides at the piano

In October 1993, Kyriakides founded the piano firm SVK Pianotech Ltd; a private limited company of which he held 90% of the shares with his father, Vladimiros Kyriakides, being in possession of the remaining 10% until 2011 when Stavros V. Kyriakides became the sole shareholder of the company.

SVK Pianotech Ltd operates exclusively in the piano field offering sales, rentals and technical support for both domestic and/or concert purposes. Under Kyriakides' guidance and management, the company has become one of the major players in the piano industry of the country and represents in Cyprus some of the greatest piano manufacturers in the world. In several occasions production companies and/or artists have refused to go ahead with a concert unless the piano was provided by Kyriakides. Since 2006, the company operates under the trademark Kyriakides Piano Gallery.

== Cultural involvement ==
Kyriakides has always been active in the cultural life of the island. He served as member of the board of directors to numerous non-profitable foundations. Among others, he served as Vice Chairman of the Board of Directors of the Cyprus Theatre Organization (ΘΟΚ / Θεατρικός Οργανισμός Κύπρου) and as Secretary-General, member of the Board of Directors, of the Cyprus Symphony Orchestra (Συμφωνική Ορχήστρα Κύπρου). He has participated in a number of fora and he was appointed in numerous juries and/or committees, such as the Madame Figaro Women of the Year Awards (Cyprus) and the Competition for Creative Communication of the PIO (Press and Information Office of the Republic of Cyprus). Kyriakides is the founder and President of Avantgarde Cultural Foundation (2001) whose Honorary President is the First Lady of the Republic of Cyprus and Patron the renowned Steinway Artist, Vladimir Ashkenazy. Avantgarde aims at strengthening the cultural life of Cyprus, supporting the artists and exposing the rich culture and heritage of the island both in Cyprus and abroad. He is also one of the founding members of the Cultural Institute (2008) and has served as its vice president from 2008 until 2019, when he assumed its presidency.

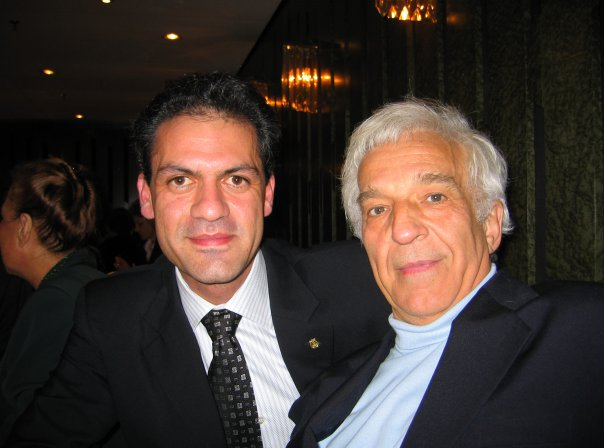
Stavros V. Kyriakides with maestro Vladimir Ashkenazy, Athens 2006

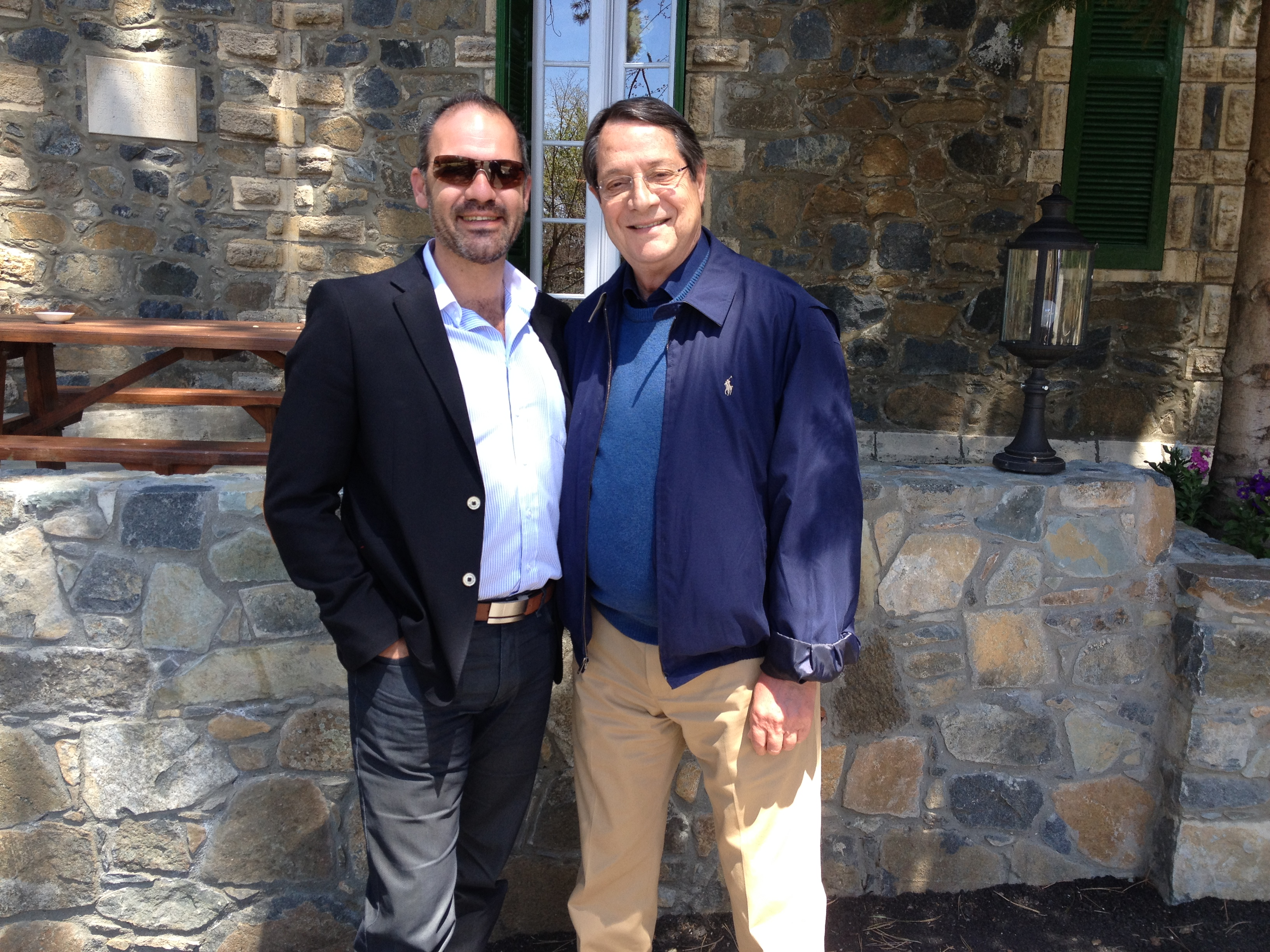
Stavros V. Kyriakides with President Anastasiades, Troodos 2013

Stavros V. Kyriakides is a never-ending source of inspiration and new ideas. He has organised some of the most successful and avant-garde events in Cyprus, including the "Young Europe Salutes Cyprus" project with the European Union Youth Orchestra under the baton of Vladimir Ashkenazy prior to Cyprus’ accession to the European Union, the "Medieval Cyprus: a Concert for 10 pianos and orchestra" event, the "Natura Madre, Natura Morta" interactive exhibition, the "Pianisti non solo" concert, the "PanCyprian Competition for Young Pianists" which is a biennial institution, the "Play Me, I'm Yours: Nicosia 2014" interactive installation with 10 pianos in the streets of Nicosia, the "Big Piano: Nicosia 2015" interactive installation with giant keyboards (as appeared in the 1989 movie "BIG" starring Tom Hanks) in the streets of Nicosia, and the "Canto Ostinato" project at the Glafcos Clerides Larnaca International Airport with 2 pianos and 2 marimbas. In 2017, Kyriakides contributed to the cultural program of Paphos; European Capital of Culture 2017 with a number of events including a two-piano recital with Vladimir and Vovka Ashkenazy at the Ancient Odeon and the world premiere of a work commissioned from renowned Cypriot composer Savvas Savva for piano, keyboards, percussion and voice under the title "From Mycenae to Paphos" especially for the occasion and staged at the idyllic location of the Coral Bay Peninsula where the Museum of Mycenaean Settlement commemorates the arrival of the Achaean Greeks to Cyprus. In 2019 Kyriakides launched "The Piano Tour" concert series, taking talented local musicians and a grand piano out of theatres and into the outdoors, to unconventional urban or natural locations to perform, and streaming it live on Facebook and YouTube so even those who can’t make it can watch. In 2023, Stavros Kyriakides with Kyriakides Piano Gallery and Avantgarde Cultural Foundation broke the Guinness World Records for "most musicians to play the same piano simultaneously", with 25 people at the piano. The event was organised by Kyriakides to help increase music awareness and audience development in Cyprus, on the occasion of Kyriakides Piano Gallery's 30th anniversary (1993-2023).

Kyriakides has displayed rich social and cultural work and donated pianos to schools, foundations and other establishments for the development of music and culture in Cyprus as well as hospitals, schools for people with special needs, rehabilitation centres and more. He is a personal friend of some of the greatest artists in the world such as Vladimir Ashkenazy and Thomas Duis. He has worked with distinguished artists (in Cyprus and abroad) including Luciano Pavarotti, Emma Shapplin, Buena Vista Social Club, Cristina Branco, Cesária Évora, The Ten Tenors, Stars in Concert, Grigory Sokolov, and Andrea Bocelli. He has received a number of awards for his service in culture by numerous foundations, institutions and companies.

== Positions ==
Managing Director of Kyriakides Piano Gallery (SVK Pianotech Ltd)

President of Avantgarde Cultural Foundation

President of the Cultural Institute (Ινστιτούτο Πολιτισμού)
