= Marios Antoniou =

Cypriot footballer (born 1980)

Personal information
- Full name: Marios Antoniou
- Date of birth: November 5, 1980 (age 45)
- Place of birth: Limassol, Cyprus
- Height: 1.83 m (6 ft 0 in)
- Position: Midfielder

Team information
- Current team: Aris Limassol

Senior career*
Years	Team	Apps	(Gls)
2001–2003	Alki Larnaca	35	(4)
2003–2005	Apollon Limassol	41	(4)
2005–2006	AEL FC	14	(0)
2006–present	Aris Limassol	36	(0)

International career
2003–2004	Cyprus	5	(0)
- * Club domestic league appearances and goals

Marios Antoniou (born November 5, 1980, in Limassol, Cyprus) is a Cypriot football midfielder who plays for Aris Limassol. His former teams Alki Larnaca, Apollon Limassol and AEL FC.
