= List of Cypriot football transfers summer 2018 =

This is a list of Cypriot football transfers for the 2018–19 summer transfer window by club. Only transfers of clubs in the Cypriot First Division are included.

== Cypriot First Division ==
Note: Flags indicate national team as has been defined under FIFA eligibility rules. Players may hold more than one non-FIFA nationality.

=== AEK Larnaca ===
In:

No.	Pos.	Nation	Player
1	GK	CYP	Andreas Christodoulou (from Omonia)
2	DF	BRA	Igor Silva (on loan from (Greece) Olympiacos)
15	MF	ARG	Facundo García (from (Spain) Leganés)
18	DF	ESP	Mikel González (from (Spain) Real Zaragoza)
19	DF	CYP	Thomas Ioannou (loan return from Doxa Katokopias)
21	FW	CIV	Jean Luc (from (Spain) Gimnàstic de Tarragona)
24	DF	CYP	Rafael Anastasiou (loan return from Anagennisi Deryneia)
25	GK	ESP	Toño (from (Spain) Real Sociedad)
31	FW	CYP	Konstantinos Konstantinou (loan return from Ethnikos Achna)

Out:

No.	Pos.	Nation	Player
1	GK	CYP	Antonis Georgallides (to Olympiakos Nicosia)
2	DF	ESP	Carles Soria (to (Spain) Espanyol B)
14	GK	MNE	Vladimir Boljević (to Doxa Katokopias)
15	GK	ESP	Juan Pablo (released)
18	DF	ESP	Ander Murillo (retired)
21	MF	CYP	Nikos Englezou (to Anorthosis Famagusta, previously loan to Aris Limassol)
22	FW	ALB	Elvir Maloku (loan return to (Spain) Gimnàstic de Tarragona)
25	FW	CYP	Nestoras Mitidis (to AEL Limassol, previously on loan at (Greece) Kerkyra)
27	MF	CYP	Michalis Music (on loan to Ayia Napa, previously on loan to Ethnikos Achna)
32	DF	POR	Nélson (released)
34	MF	CYP	Iakovos Kaiserlidis (on loan to Omonia Aradippou)
40	GK	CYP	Ioannis Michael (on loan to Digenis Oroklinis)
35	DF	SRB	Radovan Pankov (to (Serbia) Radnički Niš, previously on loan from (Russia) Ural Yekaterinburg)
77	DF	CYP	Constantinos Mintikkis (to Nea Salamis Famagusta, previously on loan)

=== AEL Limassol ===
In:

No.	Pos.	Nation	Player
5	MF	ESP	Jon Gaztañaga (from (Spain) Gimnàstic de Tarragona)
9	FW	CYP	Nestoras Mitidis (from AEK Larnaca, previously on loan at (Greece) Kerkyra)
10	MF	BRA	Alex da Silva (from Apollon Limassol)
14	FW	CYP	Andreas Makris (on loan from APOEL)
17	FW	MKD	Kire Markoski (from (North Macedonia) Rabotnički)
21	MF	CYP	Stylianos Panteli (loan return from Olympiakos Nicosia)
22	FW	ESP	Rubén Jurado (from (Poland) Arka Gdynia)
27	DF	MNE	Momčilo Rašo (from (North Macedonia) Rabotnički)
28	MF	CYP	Marios Pechlivanis (from Olympiakos Nicosia)
44	DF	GER	Nils Teixeira (from (Germany) Arminia Bielefeld)
95	GK	POL	Patryk Procek (from (Poland) Katowice)
97	MF	SRB	Marko Adamović (from (Bulgaria) Beroe Stara Zagora)

Out:

No.	Pos.	Nation	Player
10	MF	BRA	Denílson (to (China) Meixian Techand)
12	MF	CYP	Marios Nicolaou (released)
17	MF	POR	Mesca (to (Bulgaria) Beroe Stara Zagora)
19	FW	CYP	Yiannis Mavrou (on loan to Ermis Aradippou)
21	DF	ANG	Marco Airosa (released)
22	MF	TUN	Ismail Sassi (to (Greece) OFI)
28	MF	CYP	Marios Pechlivanis (on loan to Aris Limassol)
29	DF	ROU	Bogdan Mitrea (to Doxa Katokopias)
32	GK	CYP	Evangelos Georgiou (released)
35	FW	CYP	Marios Elia (on loan to Alki Oroklini)
45	DF	CYP	Andreas Kyriakou (on loan to Enosis Neon Paralimni, previously on loan to Aris Limassol)
60	MF	CPV	Marco Soares (to (Portugal) Feirense)
66	DF	CYP	Konstantinos Kyriakou (on loan to THOI Lakatamia, previously on loan at Ethnikos Assia)
81	MF	CYP	Andreas Frangos (on loan to Enosis Neon Paralimni, previously on loan at Aris Limassol)
98	MF	CYP	Andreas Neofytou (loan extension at Karmiotissa)
99	FW	URU	David Texeira (to (Portugal) Moreirense)

=== Alki Oroklini ===
In:

No.	Pos.	Nation	Player
—	DF	CYP	Andreas Themistokleous (from PAEEK)
—	MF	UKR	Volodymyr Dmytrenko (from (Ukraine) Nyva-V Vinnytsia)
5	DF	ALG	Sofyane Cherfa (from (Italy) Abano Calcio)
7	MF	CYP	Andreas Stavrou (from Pafos)
8	MF	FRA	Aikel Gadacha (from Anagennisi Deryneia)
9	FW	BRA	Marlon Silva (from (Indonesia) Borneo)
10	FW	BRA	Ivan Carlos (from (Indonesia) Persija Jakarta)
11	MF	ALG	El Hedi Belameiri (from (Algeria) CS Constantine)
14	FW	CYP	Stavrinos Konstantinou (from Anagennisi Deryneia)
16	MF	CYP	Matija Špoljarić (on loan from Apollon Limassol)
17	DF	CYP	Martinos Christofi (from Karmiotissa)
18	MF	MKD	Dushko Trajchevski (from (North Macedonia) Rabotnički)
19	MF	AUS	Bai Antoniou (from (Australia) Rockdale City Suns)
20	MF	COL	Rafael Acosta (from (Paraguay) Olimpia)
23	MF	CYP	Demetris Kyprianou (from Ermis Aradippou)
27	DF	ARG	Franco Flores (from (Argentina) Douglas Haig)
35	FW	CYP	Marios Elia (on loan from AEL Limassol)
64	MF	CYP	Apollonas Vasiliou (on loan from Omonia)
66	DF	BUL	Orlin Starokin (from (Bulgaria) Vitosha Bistritsa)
77	MF	BRA	Roninho (from (Bahrain) Manama Club)

Out:

No.	Pos.	Nation	Player
—	DF	CYP	Andreas Themistokleous (on loan to ASIL)
—	MF	UKR	Volodymyr Dmytrenko (on loan to Onisilos Sotira 2014)
7	MF	FRA	Dylan Duventru (to (Azerbaijan) Zira)
8	MF	CMR	Gilles Ngomo (to (Saudi Arabia) Abha Club)
10	MF	CYP	Nicolas Manoli (to Ormideia)
16	FW	NED	Nassir Maachi (to (Netherlands) DOVO)
17	MF	CYP	Marios Andreou (loan return to Apollon Limassol)
20	MF	FRA	Chafik Tigroudja (to (Albania) Kukësi)
22	DF	CGO	Bernard Onanga Itoua (released)
28	MF	FRA	Jean-Baptiste Pierazzi (to (France) Gazélec Ajaccio)
29	FW	MTQ	Geoffrey Malfleury (to (Romania) FC Voluntari)
30	FW	BRA	Fabrício (to (Portugal) Famalicão)
70	DF	POR	Ruca (loan return to (Portugal) Tondela)
77	MF	ALG	Bilal Hamdi (to (Azerbaijan) Zira)
77	MF	BRA	Roninho (released)
86	GK	GRE	Kiriakos Stratilatis (to Onisilos Sotira 2014)
98	FW	CYP	Petros Psychas (loan return to Apollon Limassol)
93	DF	MTQ	Christopher Glombard (to (France) Tours FC)

=== Anorthosis Famagusta ===
In:

No.	Pos.	Nation	Player
1	GK	POR	Mário Felgueiras (from (Portugal) Paços Ferreira)
7	MF	CYP	Nikos Englezou (from AEK Larnaca)
9	FW	GEO	Nika Kacharava (from (Russia) Rostov)
11	DF	FRA	Vincent Bessat (from (France) Caen)
17	FW	GEO	Beka Mikeltadze (from (Georgia (country)) Rustavi)
18	FW	SVK	Michal Ďuriš (from (Russia) Orenburg, previously on loan)
21	FW	COL	Ricardo Laborde (from (Russia) Krasnodar)
22	MF	CYP	Neofytos Kyriakou (loan return from Doxa Katokopias)
25	GK	CRO	Ivan Vargić (on loan from (Italy) Lazio)
28	DF	CYP	Constantinos Sotiriou (from Olympiakos Nicosia)
44	MF	SRB	Gojko Kacar (from (Germany) FC Augsburg)
97	GK	AUT	David Stemmer (from (Austria) Wals-Grünau)
--	DF	CRO	Drago Lovrić (from (Croatia) HNK Vukovar)

Out:

No.	Pos.	Nation	Player
1	GK	ISR	Ariel Harush (to (Israel) Hapoel Be'er Sheva)
7	MF	POR	Carlitos (to (Poland) Wisła Płock)
9	FW	BRA	André Alves (to (Hungary) Mezőkövesdi)
12	DF	CYP	Kostas Pileas (on loan to Ermis Aradippou)
17	MF	ESP	Miguel Palanca (to (India) FC Goa)
20	FW	GUI	Demba Camara (to (France) Troyes)
21	MF	AZE	Araz Abdullayev (loan return to (Azerbaijan) Gabala FK)
39	MF	CYP	Christos Hadjipaschalis (on loan to Aris Limassol)
40	MF	CYP	Nikolas Mattheou (loan return to (Greece) PAOK)
44	DF	CYP	Pavlos Correa (on loan to Aris Limassol)
45	MF	BUL	Vladimir Gadzhev (to (Bulgaria) Beroe Stara Zagora)
91	GK	CYP	Giorgos Papadopoulos (to Nea Salamis)
--	DF	CRO	Drago Lovrić (on loan to Ethnikos Achna)
--	DF	CYP	Foivos Christodoulou (to Omonia, previously on loan at Ethnikos Assia)

=== APOEL ===
In:

No.	Pos.	Nation	Player
1	GK	VEN	Rafael Romo (loan return from (Belgium) Beerschot Wilrijk)
3	DF	BRA	Caju (on loan from (Brazil) Santos)
4	MF	CYP	Kostakis Artymatas (loan return from (Greece) Kerkyra)
6	MF	GRE	Savvas Gentsoglou (from (Croatia) Hajduk Split)
9	FW	IRI	Reza Ghoochannejhad (from (Netherlands) SC Heerenveen)
13	MF	JOR	Musa Al-Taamari (from (Jordan) Shabab Al-Ordon, previously on loan at (Jordan) Al-Jazeera)
19	MF	ARG	Tomás De Vincenti (from (United Arab Emirates) Shabab Al-Ahli)
20	MF	CYP	Alex Konstantinou (from Ermis Aradippou)
23	MF	ARG	Juan Cascini (on loan from (Argentina) Estudiantes)
32	DF	POR	Yohan Tavares (from (Portugal) Vitória Setúbal)
37	FW	BRA	Léo Natel (on loan from (Brazil) São Paulo)
50	DF	BRA	Carlão (loan extension from (Italy) Torino)
77	FW	HUN	Norbert Balogh (on loan from (Italy) Palermo)

Out:

No.	Pos.	Nation	Player
1	GK	MEX	Raúl Gudiño (loan return to (Portugal) Porto B)
3	DF	ESP	Roberto Lago (released)
6	MF	NED	Lorenzo Ebecilio (to (Serbia) Red Star Belgrade)
8	FW	BEN	Mickaël Poté (to (Turkey) Adana Demirspor)
9	FW	BEL	Igor De Camargo (to (Belgium) Mechelen)
10	MF	HUN	Roland Sallai (to (Germany) SC Freiburg)
13	GK	ESP	Nauzet Pérez (to (Spain) Las Palmas)
14	MF	AUS	Tommy Oar (to (Australia) Central Coast Mariners)
16	MF	BRA	Vinícius (released)
23	DF	BLR	Dzyanis Palyakow (to (Belarus) BATE Borisov)
25	MF	ARG	Agustín Farías (loan return to (Chile) Palestino)
32	DF	POR	Yohan Tavares (to (France) Troyes)
33	FW	CYP	Andreas Makris (on loan to AEL Limassol)
93	GK	CYP	Neofytos Michael (on loan to (Greece) PAS Giannina, previously on loan at Aris Limassol)
98	GK	CYP	Andreas Paraskeva (on loan to Othellos Athienou)
—	DF	CYP	Kypros Christoforou (on loan to Nea Salamis Famagusta, previously on loan at Aris Limassol)
—	MF	CYP	Vasilis Papafotis (to Doxa Katokopias, previously on loan)
—	MF	CYP	Georgios Christodoulou (to Ermis Aradippou, previously on loan at Pafos)
—	FW	CYP	Michalis Charalambous (on loan to (Portugal) Varzim, previously on loan at Ethnikos Achna)

=== Apollon Limassol ===
In:

No.	Pos.	Nation	Player
8	MF	MRI	Kévin Bru (from (England) Ipswich Town)
9	FW	FRA	David Faupala (from (Ukraine) Zorya Luhansk)
14	MF	ARG	Facundo Pereyra (from (Argentina) Gimnasia La Plata)
15	DF	BFA	Dylan Ouédraogo (from (France) Monaco II)
19	MF	GAM	Mustapha Carayol (from (England) Ipswich Town)
20	MF	GUI	Richard Soumah (from (Israel) Maccabi Petah Tikva)
25	MF	CYP	Chambos Kyriakou (loan return from (Portugal) Estoril)
56	DF	CYP	Leonidas Kyriakou (loan return from THOI Lakatamia)
57	FW	CYP	Petros Psychas (loan return from Alki Oroklini)

Out:

No.	Pos.	Nation	Player
6	DF	CYP	Andreas Karo (on loan to Pafos FC, previously on loan at Nea Salamis Famagusta)
9	MF	ARG	Nicolás Martínez (loan return to (Greece) Olympiacos)
10	MF	BRA	Alex da Silva (to AEL Limassol)
13	MF	CYP	Constantinos Makrides (retired)
14	MF	BRA	Allan (loan return to (England) Liverpool)
16	MF	ESP	Miguel Bedoya (retired)
20	MF	SCO	Alastair Reynolds (released)
21	DF	BRA	Jander (to Pafos FC)
23	MF	CYP	Matija Špoljarić (on loan to Alki Oroklini)
27	DF	CYP	Angelis Charalambous (to Enosis Neon Paralimni)
33	FW	CYP	Ioannis Chadjivasilis (to Doxa Katokopias)
51	DF	CYP	Constantinos Aristotelous (to Omonia Aradippou, previously on loan at Ethnikos Assia)
52	FW	CYP	Ioannis Pittas (on loan to Enosis Neon Paralimni)
53	FW	CYP	Theodoros Iosifides (to (Spain) CD Móstoles, previously on loan at (Spain) Fuenlabrada)
58	MF	CYP	Marios Andreou (released, previously on loan at Alki Oroklini)
59	MF	CYP	Evdoras Silvestrou (to Aris Limassol)
64	MF	CYP	Michalis Genethliou (on loan to Karmiotissa)
65	DF	CYP	Olymbios Antoniades (to Aris Limassol)
68	DF	ROU	Andrei Pițian (loan return to (Romania) Astra Giurgiu)
90	GK	CYP	Ellinas Sofroniou (to AEZ Zakakiou)
92	MF	CRO	Antonio Jakoliš (loan return to (Romania) Steaua București)
95	MF	BRA	Alef (loan return to (Portugal) Braga)
96	MF	BEL	Luca Polizzi (on loan to Pafos FC, previously on loan at Olympiakos Nicosia)
—	MF	POR	Lisandro Semedo (to (Netherlands) Fortuna Sittard, previously on loan)

=== Doxa Katokopias ===
In:

No.	Pos.	Nation	Player
2	DF	POR	Joel Pereira (from (Portugal) Académico de Viseu)
3	DF	CYP	Ioannis Efstathiou (from Aris Limassol)
6	MF	ROU	Răzvan Tincu (from (Romania) Botoșani)
7	FW	BRA	Felipe Augusto (from (Portugal) Vizela)
8	DF	GUI	Jean Charles Fernandez (from (Guinea) ASFAG Conakry)
9	FW	CRO	Mario Crnički (from (Germany) Bayern Munich II)
9	FW	FIN	Berat Sadik (contract renewal)
10	MF	CYP	Vasilis Papafotis (from APOEL, previously on loan)
10	MF	MEX	Édgar Pacheco (from Ermis Aradippou)
12	DF	ESP	Borja Freire (from (Spain) Racing Ferrol)
14	MF	MNE	Vladimir Boljević (from AEK Larnaca)
19	FW	CYP	Ioannis Chadjivasilis (from Apollon Limassol)
28	FW	UKR	Yevhen Pavlov (from (Hungary) Vasas)
29	DF	ROU	Bogdan Mitrea (from AEL Limassol)
55	DF	BRA	Nelsinho (from (Portugal) Arouca)
66	MF	CYP	Andreas Pachipis (from Aris Limassol)
78	GK	CYP	Giorgos Loizou (from Othellos Athienou)

Out:

No.	Pos.	Nation	Player
—	MF	CYP	Andreas Komodikis (on loan to ASIL Lysi, previously on loan at PAEEK)
3	FW	CIV	Ibrahim Sissoko (to (Turkey) Eskişehirspor)
6	DF	ESP	Manuel Redondo (to (Spain) Coria CF)
9	FW	CGO	Rahavi Kifoueti (to (Turkey) Elazigspor)
9	FW	CRO	Mario Crnički (to Olympiakos Nicosia)
10	MF	MEX	Édgar Pacheco (to (Azerbaijan) Sabail FK)
14	FW	ANG	Wilson Kenidy (to (Portugal) Louletano)
15	FW	FRA	Dylan Bikey (on loan to (France) JA Drancy)
17	FW	GHA	Francis Narh (to (Turkey) Karabükspor)
19	DF	CYP	Thomas Ioannou (loan return to AEK Larnaca)
20	FW	CYP	Charalampos Mouzouros (to MEAP Nisou)
22	DF	CYP	Andys Nikolaou (to Akritas Chlorakas, previously on loan to PAEEK)
23	MF	CYP	Stefanos Charalambous (to PAEEK)
32	MF	CYP	Neofytos Kyriakou (loan return to Anorthosis Famagusta)
38	MF	CYP	Marios Poutziouris (to Ermis Aradippou)
91	GK	CYP	Antonis Mavrantonis (on loan to MEAP Nisou)
97	FW	BRA	Bruno Rodrigues (loan return to (Brazil) Atlético Paranaense)
99	GK	CYP	Evagoras Hadjifrangiskou (to ASIL Lysi)

=== Enosis Neon Paralimni ===
In:

No.	Pos.	Nation	Player
1	GK	ISR	Boris Klaiman (from (Israel) Beitar Jerusalem)
3	DF	FRA	Magatte Sarr (from (France) AJ Auxerre II)
4	MF	ESP	Sito Riera (from (Poland) Śląsk Wrocław)
5	DF	CYP	Demetris Moulazimis (from (Czech Republic) Olympia Radotín)
6	MF	CMR	Eyong Enoh (from (Netherlands) Willem II)
7	MF	RUS	Aleksandr Shcherbakov (from (Russia) Ural Yekaterinburg)
10	FW	ARG	Gonzalo Zárate (from (Switzerland) Lausanne-Sport)
15	FW	NGR	Chigozie Udoji (from (Greece) Platanias)
19	DF	ARM	Hovhannes Hambardzumyan (from (North Macedonia) FK Vardar)
21	DF	ARG	Maximiliano Oliva (from (Romania) Dinamo București)
23	DF	ESP	Borja Ekiza (from Omonia)
24	DF	USA	Riley Grant (from (United States) Cleveland SC)
27	DF	CYP	Angelis Charalambous (from Apollon Limassol)
28	DF	GRE	Vasilios Vallianos (from (Greece) Doxa Drama)
31	FW	DEN	Morten Rasmussen (from (Poland) Pogoń Szczecin)
37	FW	ENG	Omar Rowe (from Ayia Napa)
45	DF	CYP	Andreas Kyriakou (on loan from AEL Limassol)
64	MF	GEO	Irakli Maisuradze (from (Hungary) Balmazújvárosi FC)
77	FW	CYP	Ioannis Pittas (on loan from Apollon Limassol)
80	MF	CYP	Andreas Frangos (on loan from AEL Limassol)
97	FW	POR	Valter Zacarias (from (Switzerland) FC Sion U21)
--	DF	ARG	Pablo Carreras (from (Argentina) Club Atlético River Plate)
--	FW	CYP	Johny El Zein (from Ethnikos Achna)

Out:

No.	Pos.	Nation	Player
--	MF	BEL	Martin Remacle (loan extension to Ayia Napa)
1	GK	ESP	Pulpo Romero (released)
2	DF	BRA	João Leonardo (to Olympiakos Nicosia)
3	DF	CYP	Nicos Efthymiou (to Anagennisi Deryneia)
7	MF	BUL	Daniel Genov (to (Bulgaria) Botev Vratsa)
9	FW	COL	David Solari (to Othellos Athienou)
10	MF	BRA	Edenilson (to (Kosovo) FC Drita)
21	MF	CYP	Constantinos Constantinou (to Ayia Napa)
22	DF	CYP	Demetris Economou (to Ayia Napa)
24	DF	CYP	Ioannis Antoniou (to Anagennisi Deryneia)
28	MF	CYP	Michalis Giorkatzis (to Olympiakos Nicosia)
32	MF	CYP	Evangelos Kyriacou (from Anagennisi Deryneia)
77	MF	CRO	Ivan Ćurjurić (to (Bosnia and Herzegovina) Željezničar)
93	DF	CYP	Vasilis Papageorgiou (to Olympiakos Nicosia)
97	FW	POR	Valter Zacarias (on loan to Ayia Napa)

=== Ermis Aradippou ===
In:

No.	Pos.	Nation	Player
2	DF	FRA	Herold Goulon (from Pafos FC)
3	DF	MNE	Vladimir Volkov (from (Serbia) Rad)
4	MF	CYP	Marios Poutziouris (from Doxa Katokopias)
7	FW	CYP	Giorgos Katsiatis (from Digenis Oroklinis)
9	FW	CYP	Yiannis Mavrou (on loan from AEL Limassol)
10	MF	ESP	Didac Devesa (from (Greece) Apollon Smyrnis)
11	FW	RUS	Nikolai Kipiani (on loan from Omonia)
12	DF	CYP	Kostas Pileas (on loan from Anorthosis Famagusta)
14	MF	CYP	Marios Demetriou (on loan from Omonia)
18	DF	ESP	Iván Malón (from (Spain) Recreativo de Huelva)
19	FW	GUI	Sekou Keita (from (France) Red Star)
20	FW	CMR	Marcel Essombé (free agent)
23	MF	CYP	Gerasimos Fylaktou (from Omonia, previously on loan at Pafos FC)
25	DF	ANG	David Kuagica (from (Lithuania) FC Stumbras)
40	GK	GRE	Giannis Firinidis (from (Greece) Apollon Larissa)
44	MF	GRE	Konstantinos Banousis (from (Greece) Asteras Amaliada)
45	MF	CYP	Georgios Christodoulou (from APOEL, previously on loan at Pafos)
77	MF	CYP	Elias Georgiou (from Ayia Napa)
91	GK	CYP	Giorgos Papadopoulos (from Nea Salamis Famagusta)
92	DF	POR	Sandro Sakho (from (Estonia) Tallinna Kalev)
97	FW	BRA	Índio (from (Brazil) Sport Recife)

Out:

No.	Pos.	Nation	Player
3	DF	CYP	Fotis Kezos (to (Greece) AO Trikala)
4	DF	UKR	Maksym Imerekov (to (Ukraine) Desna Chernihiv)
9	FW	SUI	Innocent Emeghara (to (Azerbaijan) Qarabağ)
10	FW	CGO	Juvhel Tsoumou (to (Romania) Hermannstadt)
11	MF	CYP	Alex Konstantinou (to APOEL)
16	DF	ROU	Radu Zaharia (to (Romania) Hermannstadt)
18	DF	ESP	Alfonso Artabe (to (Romania) Voluntari)
19	MF	MEX	Édgar Pacheco (to Doxa Katokopias)
20	DF	POR	China (to (Portugal) Vilafranquense)
21	DF	MKD	Aleksandar Damčevski (to Ararat-Armenia)
22	GK	CYP	Giorgos Panagi (to Alki Oroklini)
23	MF	CYP	Zacharias Theodorou (to Nea Salamis Famagusta)
24	MF	NED	Pim Bouwman (released)
25	FW	POR	Monteiro (to (Portugal) Beira-Mar)
26	MF	CYP	Demetris Kyprianou (to Alki Oroklini)

=== Nea Salamis Famagusta ===
In:

No.	Pos.	Nation	Player
1	GK	SWE	John Alvbåge (on loan from Omonia)
4	DF	ESP	Román Golobart (from (Spain) Mérida)
5	DF	CRO	Ivan Fuštar (from (Qatar) Al-Arabi)
7	MF	ESP	Toni Dovale (from (India) Bengaluru FC)
9	FW	AUT	Daniel Sikorski (from Pafos)
10	FW	NGR	Kingsley Onuegbu (from (Germany) MSV Duisburg)
11	MF	BFA	Stephane Aziz Ki (from Omonia, previously on loan at Aris Limassol)
15	MF	ARG	Federico Domínguez (from (Argentina) Aldosivi)
16	MF	CYP	Zacharias Theodorou (from Ermis Aradippou)
21	MF	CYP	Timotheos Pavlou (from ASIL)
24	DF	CYP	Kypros Christoforou (on loan from APOEL)
25	DF	CYP	Andreas Christofides (from Olympiakos Nicosia)
28	MF	CYP	Margaça (from Omonia)
44	DF	CYP	Andreas Fragkeskou (on loan from Omonia)
77	DF	CYP	Constantinos Mintikkis (from AEK Larnaca, previously on loan)
91	GK	CYP	Giorgos Papadopoulos (from Anorthosis Famagusta)

Out:

No.	Pos.	Nation	Player
1	GK	BUL	Mario Kirev (to (Albania) FC Kamza)
6	DF	CYP	Andreas Karo (loan return to Apollon Limassol)
9	FW	BUL	Dimitar Makriev (to (Bulgaria) Arda Kardzhali)
11	FW	CYP	Andreas Kyprianou (to Ethnikos Achna)
13	DF	CYP	Ioannis Kousoulos (to Omonia)
18	MF	CIV	Joël Damahou (to (Israel) Hapoel Acre)
19	MF	GRE	Yiannis Papadopoulos (to (Greece) Iraklis)
25	DF	CYP	Andreas Christofides (released)
25	FW	SLO	David Poljanec (to (Austria) Stadl-Paura)
83	FW	BRA	Carlão (to (Thailand) Pattaya United)
91	GK	CYP	Giorgos Papadopoulos (to Ermis Aradippou)
96	MF	SCO	Alastair Reynolds (loan return to Apollon Limassol)
--	DF	CYP	Chrysanthos Mantzalos (to PO Xylotymbou, previously on loan at PO Ormideia)

=== Omonia ===
In:

No.	Pos.	Nation	Player
--	DF	CYP	Foivos Christodoulou (from Anorthosis Famagusta, previously on loan at Ethnikos Assia)
--	GK	CYP	Savvas Nikolaou (from Karmiotissa)
3	DF	ESP	Christian Manrique (from (Spain) Rayo Vallecano B)
4	MF	MEX	Jorge Enríquez (from (Mexico) Guadalajara, previously on loan at (Mexico) Puebla)
5	DF	FRA	Mickaël Gaffoor (from (Spain) Albacete)
7	DF	ITA	Marco Motta (from (Spain) Almería)
10	MF	URU	Juan Ángel Albín (from (Mexico) Veracruz)
11	MF	ESP	Juanan Entrena (from (Spain) Alavés, previously on loan at (Croatia) Rudeš)
15	DF	ESP	Alberto Lora (from (Spain) Sporting Gijón)
16	MF	ESP	Jordi Gómez (from (Bulgaria) Levski Sofia)
17	MF	ESP	Cris Montes (from (Spain) Sporting Gijón B)
18	DF	ESP	Isma López (from (Spain) Sporting Gijón)
19	FW	ENG	Jordan Greenidge (from (England) Stoke City U18)
21	MF	SLO	Saša Živec (from (Poland) Piast Gliwice)
25	GK	ESP	Tomás Mejías (from (England) Middlesbrough)
23	MF	CMR	Raoul Loé (from (Bulgaria) CSKA Sofia)
24	FW	CRC	David Ramírez (from (Costa Rica) Deportivo Saprissa)
31	DF	CYP	Ioannis Kousoulos (from Nea Salamis Famagusta)
71	DF	CRO	Franjo Prce (from (Italy) Lazio)

Out:

No.	Pos.	Nation	Player
4	DF	CPV	Kay (to (Slovakia) Senica)
6	DF	BRA	William Soares (to (Portugal) Académica)
7	MF	CYP	Marios Demetriou (on loan to Ermis Aradippou)
9	FW	RUS	Nikolai Kipiani (on loan to Ermis Aradippou)
10	MF	BRA	Kanu (to (Belgium) Kortrijk)
17	FW	NGR	Theophilus Solomon (loan return to (Croatia) Rijeka)
19	DF	CYP	Andreas Panayiotou (to Pafos)
20	MF	CYP	Gerasimos Fylaktou (to Ermis Aradippou, previously on loan at Pafos)
21	FW	POR	Rafael Lopes (to (Portugal) Boavista)
23	MF	NED	Hedwiges Maduro (retired)
24	DF	GBS	Mamadu Candé (to (Portugal) Santa Clara)
25	GK	CYP	Andreas Christodoulou (to AEK Larnaca)
29	MF	BFA	Stephane Aziz Ki (to Nea Salamis Famagusta, previously on loan at Aris Limassol)
30	GK	SWE	John Alvbåge (on loan to Nea Salamis Famagusta)
32	DF	ESP	Borja Ekiza (to Enosis Neon Paralimni)
62	DF	CYP	Angelos Chrysostomou (loan extension to Omonia Aradippou)
64	FW	CYP	Apollonas Vasiliou (on loan to Alki Oroklini, previously on loan at Chalkanoras Idaliou)
65	FW	CYP	Andreas Katsantonis (to APOEL)
67	FW	CYP	Sotiris Fiakas (on loan to Othellos Athienou, previously on loan at Chalkanoras Idaliou)
68	DF	CYP	Andreas Fragkeskou (on loan to Nea Salamis Famagusta, previously on loan at PAEEK)
71	MF	NED	Nicandro Breeveld (to (Qatar) Al-Markhiya)
88	GK	BUL	Nikolay Mihaylov (released)
99	FW	CYP	Theodosis Kyprou (to Aris Limassol, previously on loan)
--	MF	CYP	Andreas Sofokleous (to Ayia Napa, previously on loan at ASIL)

=== Pafos FC ===
In:

No.	Pos.	Nation	Player
1	GK	SUI	Joël Mall (from (Germany) SV Darmstadt 98)
2	DF	CYP	Andreas Karo (on loan from Apollon Limassol)
3	DF	SCO	Kevin Holt (from (Scotland) Dundee)
6	DF	BRA	Lorran (from (Brazil) Santo André)
8	DF	SLO	Matija Širok (from (Slovenia) NK Domžale)
10	MF	BRA	Lulinha (from (United Arab Emirates) Sharjah FC)
12	GK	CYP	Evgenios Petrou (from Ethnikos Assia)
18	DF	GRE	Kostas Giannoulis (from (Greece) Asteras Tripolis)
19	FW	ARG	Federico Rasic (from (Russia) Arsenal Tula)
21	DF	BRA	Jander (from Apollon Limassol)
22	DF	CYP	Andreas Panayiotou (from Omonia)
23	DF	POR	Nuno Henrique (from (Portugal) Boavista)
24	MF	BEL	Jens Cools (from (Belgium) Waasland-Beveren)
25	MF	CZE	Zdeněk Folprecht (from (Czech Republic) Slovan Liberec)
26	DF	DEN	Patrick Banggaard (on loan from (Germany) SV Darmstadt 98)
32	DF	CZE	Radek Dejmek (from (Poland) Korona Kielce)
44	MF	CRO	Diego Živulić (from (Czech Republic) Viktoria Plzeň)
53	MF	NED	Simo Choukoud (free agent)
70	MF	COL	Brayan Angulo Mosquera (on loan from (Colombia) América de Cali)
66	DF	RUS	Pavel Lelyukhin (from (Russia) Dynamo Moscow, previously on loan at (Russia) Spartak-2 Moscow)
77	FW	SVK	Adam Nemec (from (Romania) Dinamo București)
92	FW	LAT	Deniss Rakels (from (Latvia) Riga)
96	FW	BEL	Luca Polizzi (on loan from Apollon Limassol)
98	GK	GRE	Giannis Angelopoulos (from (Greece) Olympiacos)
—	DF	LAT	Ņikita Skļarenko (from (Latvia) Riga II)
—	MF	LAT	Kristers Čudars (from (Latvia) Riga II)

Out:

No.	Pos.	Nation	Player
2	DF	ESP	Biel Company (to (Romania) Hermannstadt)
3	DF	CYP	Savvas Pikramenos (released)
4	DF	CHI	Lucas Domínguez (to (Chile) Everton)
5	MF	CYP	Georgios Christodoulou (to Ermis Aradippou, previously on loan from APOEL)
6	DF	BIH	Kenan Horić (loan return to (Turkey) Antalyaspor)
7	MF	URU	Diego Poyet (to (Romania) Politehnica Iași)
9	FW	AUT	Daniel Sikorski (to Nea Salamis Famagusta)
10	MF	BEL	Christian Brüls (released)
12	MF	NED	Boy Deul (to (Netherlands) FC Volendam)
13	DF	LAT	Vladislavs Gabovs (to (Latvia) Riga)
17	MF	CYP	Michalis Pekris (to Akritas Chlorakas)
18	DF	GRE	Kostas Giannoulis (released)
20	MF	CYP	Andreas Stavrou (to Alki Oroklini)
21	MF	CYP	Rafael Yiangoudakis (to Aris Limassol)
23	MF	CYP	Gerasimos Fylaktou (to Ermis Aradippou, previously on loan from Omonia)
23	DF	POR	Nuno Henrique (to (Portugal) Lusitânia)
27	MF	CRO	Ante Roguljić (to (Slovakia) AS Trenčín)
28	DF	FRA	Nicolas Taravel (to (France) Grenoble)
31	FW	BRA	Valdo (to (Thailand) Thai Honda)
33	MF	BEL	Jeff Callebaut (to (Belgium) Dikkelvenne)
56	FW	CYP	Charalambos Demosthenous (to Akritas Chlorakas)
64	DF	SLO	Erik Janža (loan return to (Czech Republic) Viktoria Plzeň)
78	GK	FRA	Léonard Aggoune (to (France) US Créteil)
82	MF	ALG	Mehdi Mostefa (to (France) AS Béziers)
90	GK	CYP	Andreas Vassiliou (to Akritas Chlorakas)
92	FW	LAT	Deniss Rakels (on loan to (Latvia) Riga)
93	MF	FRA	Hérold Goulon (to Ermis Aradippou)

== Cypriot Second Division ==
=== AEZ Zakakiou ===
In:

No.	Pos.	Nation	Player
1	GK	ROU	Victor Drenea (from MEAP Nisou)
5	DF	CYP	Giannis Stylianides (loan return from Amathus Ayiou Tychona)
7	FW	CYP	Marios Pastellis (from FC International Limassol)
8	MF	CYP	Ioannis Demetriou (from APEA Akrotiriou)
10	MF	ARG	Nicolás Villafañe (to (Australia) Tigers FC)
14	MF	NED	Manuel Reangelo (from Othellos Athienou)
15	DF	CYP	Periklis Moustakas (from (Australia) Bankstown Berries)
22	DF	CYP	Constantinos Zarnas (from ENY-Digenis Ipsona)
80	DF	CYP	Andreas Andreou (from Olympiakos Nicosia)
90	GK	CYP	Ellinas Sofroniou (from Apollon Limassol)
94	MF	GHA	Maxwell Ankomah (from Omonia Aradippou)
—	GK	CYP	Christos Pavlou (from Apollon Limassol U17)

Out:

No.	Pos.	Nation	Player
1	GK	POL	Mateusz Taudul (to Omonia Aradippou)
6	MF	CYP	Stefanos Volos (to ENY-Digenis Ipsona)
7	DF	CYP	Christos Demetriades (to Kourris Erimis)
8	FW	POR	Abel (released)
11	MF	CYP	Giorgos Vassiliou (to ENY-Digenis Ipsona)
15	DF	CYP	Constantinos Alexandrou (to Kourris Erimis)
20	DF	CYP	Pantelis Kyriacou (to Karmiotissa)
23	FW	RUS	Sergey Kundik (to (Greece) Panegialios GS)
26	FW	CYP	Rafael Constantinou (to Kourris Erimis)
28	DF	CYP	Constantinos Soteriou (to Kourris Erimis)
40	GK	GRE	Stylianos Tentonis (to Amathus Ayiou Tychona)
77	FW	BRA	Geancarlo (to (Slovenia) NK Ankaran)

=== Akritas Chlorakas ===
In:

No.	Pos.	Nation	Player
5	MF	CYP	Achilleas Michael (from Peyia 2014)
9	FW	CYP	Stathis Efstathiou (from Peyia 2014)
18	MF	CYP	Michalis Pekris (from Pafos FC)
22	DF	CYP	Andys Nikolaou (from Doxa Katokopias, previously on loan to PAEEK)
31	FW	NGR	Emmanuel Okoye (from (Malta) Gżira United)
50	FW	BRA	Gabriel do Carmo (from (Bulgaria) FK Sozopol)
56	FW	CYP	Charalambos Demosthenous (from Pafos FC)
90	GK	CYP	Andreas Vassiliou (from Pafos FC)
98	GK	GRE	Konstantinos Kapetanos (on loan from (Greece) Asteras Tripolis)

Out:

No.	Pos.	Nation	Player
23	DF	CYP	Michalis Ioannou (to Geroskipou FC)
31	MF	CYP	Nicos Panayides (to Karmiotissa)
49	GK	CYP	Charalambos Palas (to Finikas Ayias Marinas Chrysochous)

=== Anagennisi Deryneia ===
In: Note: Flags indicate national team as defined under FIFA eligibility rules; some limited exceptions apply. Players may hold more than one non-FIFA nationality.

No.	Pos.	Nation	Player
7	FW	FRA	Jean-Michel Joachim (from (India) NEROCA)
8	MF	CYP	Christoforos Kourtis (from ASIL)
9	MF	MKD	Hakan Redzep (from (Denmark) Fremad Amager)
16	DF	CYP	Antonis Ioannou (from Ethnikos Assia)
19	FW	GRE	Antonis Ranos (from (Greece) AE Sparti)
20	DF	CYP	Marios Nicolaou (loan extension from Anorthosis Famagusta)
24	DF	CYP	Ioannis Antoniou (from Enosis Neon Paralimni)
32	MF	CYP	Evangelos Kyriacou (from Enosis Neon Paralimni)
34	DF	CYP	Nicos Efthymiou (from Enosis Neon Paralimni)

Out: Note: Flags indicate national team as defined under FIFA eligibility rules; some limited exceptions apply. Players may hold more than one non-FIFA nationality.

No.	Pos.	Nation	Player
2	DF	CYP	Nicolas Fotiou (to Ethnikos Achna)
6	MF	CYP	Andreas Chapeshis (to Digenis Oroklinis)
7	FW	CYP	Prodromos Therapontos (to Ethnikos Achna)
8	MF	FRA	Aikel Gadacha (to Alki Oroklini)
9	MF	CRO	Valentino Stepčić (to (Germany) Stuttgarter Kickers)
23	DF	GRE	Dionysis Tsiouchas (to (Greece) Pierikos)
25	DF	CYP	Rafael Anastasiou (loan return to AEK Larnaca)
38	FW	FRA	Papa Ibou Kébé (to (Slovenia) NK Tabor Sežana)
80	FW	CYP	Stavrinos Constantinou (to Alki Oroklini)

=== Aris Limassol ===
In: Note: Flags indicate national team as defined under FIFA eligibility rules; some limited exceptions apply. Players may hold more than one non-FIFA nationality.

No.	Pos.	Nation	Player
4	MF	GRE	Panagiotis Anyfantakis (from (Greece) Doxa Neo Sidirochori)
6	MF	CYP	Rafael Yiangoudakis (from Pafos FC)
7	MF	ESP	Armiche (from (Bolivia) Sport Boys)
8	MF	BRA	Eduardo Brito (from (Greece) Apollon Pontus)
9	FW	GRE	Antonis Kyriazis (from (Greece) AEK Athens)
10	MF	GRE	Vasilis Angelopoulos (from (Greece) Platanias)
16	DF	GRE	Angelos Papasterianos (from (Greece) AO Kavala)
17	FW	CYP	Theodosis Kyprou (from Omonia, previously on loan)
19	MF	CYP	Evdoras Silvestrou (from Apollon Limassol)
21	DF	CYP	Olymbios Antoniades (from Apollon Limassol)
23	MF	CYP	Pantelis Panteli (from AEL Limassol U19)
28	MF	CYP	Marios Pechlivanis (on loan from AEL Limassol)
39	MF	CYP	Christos Hadjipaschalis (on loan from Anorthosis Famagusta)
44	DF	CYP	Pavlos Correa (on loan from Anorthosis Famagusta)
88	GK	CYP	Alexander Špoljarić (from (Serbia) FK Grafičar Beograd)

Out: Note: Flags indicate national team as defined under FIFA eligibility rules; some limited exceptions apply. Players may hold more than one non-FIFA nationality.

No.	Pos.	Nation	Player
2	DF	CYP	Kypros Christoforou (loan return to APOEL, now on loan at Nea Salamis Famagusta)
3	DF	CYP	Ioannis Efstathiou (to Doxa Katokopias)
6	MF	CYP	Andreas Pachipis (to Doxa Katokopias)
8	MF	CYP	Andreas Frangos (loan return to AEL Limassol, now on loan at Enosis Neon Paralimni)
10	FW	ROU	Alexandru Ioniță (to (Romania) Sportul Snagov)
16	DF	ROU	Andrei Radu (to (Romania) CFR Cluj)
19	DF	MKD	Vlatko Drobarov (to (North Macedonia) FK Belasica)
21	FW	CYP	Nikos Englezou (to Anorthosis Famagusta, previously on loan from AEK Larnaca)
22	MF	BFA	Stephane Aziz Ki (to Nea Salamis Famagusta, previously on loan from Omonia)
23	FW	GRE	Konstantinos Pangalos (to (Greece) AO Paleochora)
45	DF	CYP	Andreas Kyriakou (loan return to AEL Limassol, now on loan at Enosis Neon Paralimni)
80	MF	CMR	Evariste Ngolok (released)
82	DF	GRE	Georgios Kousas (to (Greece) Iraklis)
83	DF	CYP	Vassilis Demosthenous (to (Italy) Rieti)
87	FW	SWE	Christer Youssef (released)
93	GK	CYP	Neofytos Michael (loan return to APOEL, now on loan at (Greece) PAS Giannina)
94	MF	FRA	Kevin Tapoko (to (Greece) Apollon Smyrnis)
99	GK	GRE	Angelos Kananis (to (Greece) Aigniakos)

=== ASIL ===
In:

No.	Pos.	Nation	Player
1	GK	GRE	Stelios Kypreos (from (Greece) A.O. Nea Ionia)
4	MF	MAW	Tawonga Chimodzi (from (Greece) ΑΕ Sparti)
5	MF	SEN	Issaga Diallo (from (Romania) Foresta Suceava)
6	DF	AUS	Jacob Eliopoulos (from PAEEK)
7	MF	CYP	Andreas Komodikis (on loan from Doxa Katokopias, previously on loan at PAEEK)
8	MF	CMR	Hervé Bodiong (from PAEEK)
10	MF	CIV	Félicien Gbedinyessi (from PAEEK)
11	FW	CYP	Sergis Avraam (from Omonia Aradippou)
17	DF	CYP	Constantinos Demetriou (from Karmiotissa)
19	FW	ALB	Alexandros Bracjani (from PAEEK)
20	DF	CYP	Stelios Mattheou (from THOI Lakatamia)
23	DF	CYP	Andreas Themistokleous (on loan from Alki Oroklini)
27	DF	CYP	Georgios Eleftheriou (from PAEEK)
33	DF	CYP	Giorgos Pelagias (free agent)
75	MF	GLP	Matthieu Bemba (from (Poland) Radomiak Radom)
77	MF	GRE	Lyberis Stergidis (from (Greece) Panachaiki)
92	FW	ALG	Abdel Saiad Djebbar (from (France) unknown)
93	GK	GRE	Christos Karadais (from (Greece) Olympiacos U19)
99	GK	CYP	Evagoras Hadjifrangiskou (from Doxa Katokopias)

Out:

No.	Pos.	Nation	Player
1	GK	CYP	Constantinos Zacharoudiou (to THOI Lakatamia)
3	DF	BUL	Oleg Toshev (released)
4	DF	CYP	Theodoros Theodorou (to Digenis Oroklinis)
6	DF	ROU	Bogdan Panait (to (Romania) Metaloglobus București)
8	MF	CYP	Demetris Kyriakou (to THOI Lakatamia)
11	MF	CYP	Timotheos Pavlou (to Nea Salamis Famagusta)
14	MF	MDA	Roman Bolbocian (to Digenis Oroklinis)
16	DF	GRE	Kostas Kotsaridis (to (Greece) AS Giannitsa)
19	FW	CYP	Andreas Pittaras (to Onisilos Sotira 2014)
20	MF	CYP	Christoforos Kourtis (to Anagennisi Deryneia)
24	DF	CYP	Panayiotis Polykarpou (to PO Ormideia)
26	DF	GRE	Stavros Nikolaou (to Onisilos Sotira 2014)
32	GK	CYP	Gavriel Constantinou (to Digenis Oroklinis)
40	MF	CYP	Andreas Sofokleous (to Ayia Napa, previously on loan from Omonia)
87	DF	CYP	Christodoulos Kountouretis (to THOI Lakatamia)
88	FW	CYP	Nicolas Alexiou (to Digenis Oroklinis)
99	MF	VEN	Héctor González (retired)

=== Ayia Napa ===
In:

No.	Pos.	Nation	Player
5	MF	CYP	Marko Anthony Melas (from Ethnikos Achna)
7	MF	BUL	Pavel Petkov (from (Bulgaria) Tsarsko Selo Sofia)
8	MF	CYP	Constantinos Constantinou (from Enosis Neon Paralimni)
9	MF	BEL	Martin Remacle (loan extension from Enosis Neon Paralimni)
10	FW	ARG	Yamil Romero (free agent)
12	MF	CYP	Michalis Music (on loan from AEK Larnaca, previously on loan at Ethnikos Achna)
20	FW	ARG	Sergio Unrein (free agent)
28	FW	POR	Valter Zacarias (on loan from Enosis Neon Paralimni)
40	MF	CYP	Andreas Sofokleous (from Omonia, previously on loan at ASIL)
94	GK	CYP	Andreas Efstathiou (from Ethnikos Latsion)

Out:

No.	Pos.	Nation	Player
7	MF	CYP	Costas Markou (to Karmiotissa)
9	FW	ENG	Omar Rowe (to Enosis Neon Paralimni)
10	FW	CYP	Alekos Alekou (to Amathus Ayiou Tychona)
12	DF	CYP	Stylianos Stylianou (to Amathus Ayiou Tychona)
13	GK	CYP	Panayiotis Panayiotou (to Omonia Aradippou)
19	MF	CYP	Elias Georgiou (to Ermis Aradippou)
21	FW	GRE	Dionysis Kaloudis (to (Greece) Panegialios)
26	MF	GRE	Rafail Gioukaris (to (Greece) AO Trikala)
27	DF	FRA	Robin Lafarge (released)

=== Digenis Oroklinis ===
In:

No.	Pos.	Nation	Player
2	MF	CYP	Kyriacos Paraskeva (from Nea Salamis Famagusta U19)
3	DF	CYP	Zannetos Koumasis (from P.O. Xylotymbou)
5	DF	CYP	Theodoros Theodorou (from ASIL)
6	MF	GER	Yannick Rolff (from (Germany) FC Oberneuland)
7	FW	BUL	Yordan Dimitrov (from Ethnikos Latsion)
9	FW	CYP	Nicolas Alexiou (from ASIL)
10	MF	CYP	Chrysostomos Chrysostomou (from Onisilos Sotira 2014)
12	DF	CYP	Agathangelos Nikiforou (from Anorthosis Famagusta U19)
14	MF	MDA	Roman Bolbocian (from ASIL)
16	MF	GHA	Anderson Otumfour Darkwa (from Elpida Astromeriti)
17	MF	CMR	Sorel Chemin (from PO Ormideia)
19	FW	CYP	Loizos Shikki (from Livadiakos/Salamina Livadion)
20	MF	CYP	Andreas Chapeshis (from Anagennisi Deryneia)
21	MF	CYP	Andreas Nicolaou (from Othellos Athienou)
22	DF	CYP	Louben Stylianou (from Omonia Psevda)
23	MF	CYP	Georgios Loizidis (from Chalkanoras Idaliou)
27	MF	CYP	Paraskevas Choutris (from P.O. Xylotymbou)
32	GK	CYP	Gavriel Constantinou (from ASIL)
40	GK	CYP	Ioannis Michael (on loan from AEK Larnaca)
69	DF	CYP	Georgios Velkov (from P.O. Xylotymbou)
93	FW	CYP	Nicos Pitsillides (from Othellos Athienou)

Out:

No.	Pos.	Nation	Player
2	DF	CYP	Andreas Vrachimi (to ASPIS Pylas)
3	FW	CIV	Flavien Tamou (released)
7	FW	CYP	Giorgos Katsiatis (loan return to Ermis Aradippou)
8	DF	CYP	Christoforos Charalambous (to THOI Lakatamia)
10	FW	FRA	Esmel Anicet (released)
12	FW	CYP	Theodoros Papanikolaou (to PAEEK)
19	FW	CYP	Manolis Manoli (to P.O. Xylotymbou)
20	DF	GHA	Zest Banahene (to Kourris Erimis)
22	DF	CYP	Savvas Lambros Panayiotou (to ASPIS Pylas)
23	GK	CYP	Zannetos Mytidis (to Othellos Athienou)
24	FW	CYP	Petros Kourou (to PAEEK)
27	GK	CYP	Marios Frantzis (released)
30	GK	CYP	Andreas Photiou (released)
39	MF	CYP	Christos Kallis (to Onisilos Sotira 2014)
80	MF	CYP	Georgios Koutouna (to PAEEK)
88	MF	CYP	Giannis Savva (to Olympias Lympion)
94	DF	CYP	Nektarios Kattos (to Digenis Akritas Morphou)
99	FW	CYP	Antreas Anastasiou (to Achyronas Liopetriou)

=== Ethnikos Achna ===
In:

No.	Pos.	Nation	Player
2	DF	CYP	Nicolas Fotiou (from Anagennisi Deryneia)
5	MF	BRA	Eduardo Pincelli (from (Republic of Ireland) Sligo Rovers)
6	DF	CYP	Sotiris Finiris (from THOI Lakatamia)
8	FW	GRE	Christos Marathonitis (from (Greece) Kallithea)
9	FW	CYP	Andreas Kyprianou (from Nea Salamis Famagusta)
11	FW	BRA	Sidnei (from (Brazil) Ituano)
16	MF	MKD	Nikola Gligorov (from (North Macedonia) FK Vardar)
19	FW	GRE	Stelios Pozoglou (free agent)
20	MF	CYP	Chrysovalantis Kapartis (from Olympiakos Nicosia)
21	DF	MKD	Bojan Markoski (from Othellos Athienou)
70	FW	CYP	Prodromos Therapontos (from Anagennisi Deryneia)
90	DF	CRO	Drago Lovrić (on loan from Anorthosis Famagusta)
95	GK	CYP	Andreas Loizou (from Onisilos Sotira 2014)

Out:

No.	Pos.	Nation	Player
13	DF	CYP	Petros Chatziaros (to P.O. Xylotymbou)
14	FW	CYP	Johny El Zein (to Enosis Neon Paralimni)
17	MF	CYP	Michalis Music (loan return to AEK Larnaca, now on loan at Ayia Napa)
19	FW	CYP	Michalis Charalambous (loan return to APOEL, now on loan at (Portugal) Varzim)
24	MF	CYP	Paraskevas Kouis (to Olympias Lympion)
33	GK	CYP	Chrysostomos Koukoumas (to Elpida Astromeriti)
70	FW	CYP	Constantinos Constantinou (loan return to AEK Larnaca)
80	MF	COL	Yair Castro (to (Portugal) S.U. 1º de Dezembro)
88	MF	CYP	Georgios Aresti (to (England) Haringey Borough)
99	MF	CYP	Marko Anthony Melas (to Ayia Napa)

=== Karmiotissa ===
In:

No.	Pos.	Nation	Player
2	MF	SLO	David Lukanc (from (Slovenia) NK Aluminij)
5	DF	BRA	Douglas (free agent)
6	MF	BRA	Zé Vitor (free agent)
11	MF	CYP	Nicos Panayides (from Akritas Chlorakas)
17	DF	CYP	Andreas Niokkas (from (Greece) Tsiklitiras Pylou)
18	MF	POR	Flavio Bento (from APEP)
20	DF	CYP	Pantelis Kyriacou (from AEZ Zakakiou)
21	MF	CYP	Michalis Genethliou (on loan from Apollon Limassol)
30	MF	CYP	Costas Markou (from Ayia Napa)
39	FW	GRE	Taxiarchis Thanelas (from THOI Lakatamia)
98	MF	CYP	Andreas Neofytou (loan extension from AEL Limassol)

Out:

No.	Pos.	Nation	Player
3	DF	CYP	Sotiris Vasiliou (loan return to AEL Limassol)
5	DF	GRE	Vassilios Apostolopoulos (released)
8	DF	ESP	Pablo Suárez (released)
17	DF	CYP	Constantinos Demetriou (to ASIL)
82	DF	BRA	Edmar (to (Portugal) S.U. 1º de Dezembro)
93	DF	CYP	Martinos Christofi (to Alki Oroklini)

=== MEAP Nisou ===
In:

No.	Pos.	Nation	Player
1	GK	GRE	Eleftherios Chatziadamidis (from PAEEK)
2	DF	CYP	Giorgos Costa (from PAEEK)
6	MF	CYP	Sergios Panayiotou (from PAEEK)
7	FW	CYP	Charalampos Mouzouros (from Doxa Katokopias)
10	MF	CYP	Giorgos Siapanis (from THOI Lakatamia)
17	FW	GHA	Samad Oppong (from PAEEK)
18	GK	CYP	Antonis Mavrantonis (on loan from Doxa Katokopias)
20	DF	FRA	Paul Romain Bangwent (from Elpida Astromeriti)
24	DF	CYP	Stelios Mina (from Ethnikos Assia)
37	MF	BRA	Luciano Bebê (back from retirement)
77	DF	CYP	Panayiotis Panayiotou (from Othellos Athienou)
--	DF	USA	Ernesto Applefield Alvarez (from (Romania) Râmnicu Vâlcea)

Out:

No.	Pos.	Nation	Player
3	DF	CYP	Andreas Yiasemi (to Olympias Lympion)
7	MF	CYP	Antonis Moulazimis (to Digenis Akritas Morphou)
10	MF	CYP	Nikolas Papazachariou (to Chalkanoras Idaliou)
17	MF	CYP	Constantinos Trillides (to Chalkanoras Idaliou)
18	GK	ROU	Victor Drenea (to AEZ Zakakiou)
25	DF	CYP	Nicolas Yiatrou (to Chalkanoras Idaliou)
29	MF	CYP	Efthymios Georgiou (to Olympias Lympion)
30	MF	MLT	Udo Nwoko (released)
33	MF	CYP	Giannakis Olympios (to Olympias Lympion)
69	MF	CYP	Nicolas Stavrou (to Ethnikos Latsion)

=== Olympiakos Nicosia ===
In:

No.	Pos.	Nation	Player
5	DF	BRA	João Leonardo (from Enosis Neon Paralimni)
6	MF	AUT	Thomas Piermayr (from (Austria) Juniors OÖ)
7	FW	POR	Rogério Silva (from (Portugal) Sousense)
9	FW	VEN	José Romo (from (Venezuela) Aragua F.C.)
10	MF	POR	Fábio Vieira (from (Portugal) F.C. Felgueiras)
20	FW	AUT	Samuel Oppong (from (Austria) Rapid Wien II)
22	MF	GRE	Theodoros Mingos (from (Greece) Panathinaikos)
24	DF	CYP	Giannis Savva (from (Greece) AE Sparti)
30	FW	CYP	Michalis Giorkatzis (from Enosis Neon Paralimni FC)
31	MF	GBS	Nani Soares (from (Portugal) F.C. Felgueiras)
33	GK	CYP	Antonis Georgallides (from AEK Larnaca)
77	MF	POR	Diogo Ramos (from (Portugal) Varzim S.C.)
93	DF	CYP	Vasilis Papageorgiou (from Enosis Neon Paralimni)
98	FW	CRO	Mario Crnički (from Doxa Katokopias)
99	GK	CYP	Demosthenis Demosthenous (from Chalkanoras Idaliou)
--	MF	CYP	Stavros Zevlaris (from P.O. Xylotymbou)
--	MF	POR	Vítor Pisco (from (Portugal) Sousense)

Out:

No.	Pos.	Nation	Player
1	GK	ALB	Isli Hidi (to (Albania) Teuta Durrës)
5	DF	CYP	Angelos Tsiaklis (released)
6	MF	CYP	Kyriacos Polykarpou (retired)
7	MF	CYP	Marios Pechlivanis (to AEL Limassol)
8	MF	POR	Miguelito (from (Portugal) Amarante)
9	FW	POR	Romeu Torres (from (Luxembourg) Pr. Niederkorn)
10	MF	POR	Hélder Castro (from (Portugal) Lusitânia de Lourosa)
15	MF	RUS	Artur Valikayev (released)
17	DF	CYP	Nicolas Menelaou (released)
20	FW	CYP	Chrysovalantis Kapartis (to Ethnikos Achna)
21	MF	CYP	Stylianos Panteli (loan return to AEL Limassol)
22	DF	CYP	Alexandros Lemonaris (to THOI Lakatamia)
25	DF	CYP	Andreas Christofides (to Nea Salamis Famagusta)
28	DF	CYP	Constantinos Sotiriou (to Anorthosis Famagusta)
30	DF	GRE	Nikos Ziabaris (to (Greece) Iraklis)
33	MF	CYP	Panayiotis Andreou (to (United States) Albany Great Danes)
70	DF	CYP	Andreas Andreou (to AEZ Zakakiou)
94	MF	FRA	Yoann Tribeau (to Othellos Athienou)
96	MF	BEL	Luca Polizzi (loan return to Apollon Limassol)
--	FW	CYP	Sozos Papacharalampous (on loan to PAEEK, previously on loan at Ethnikos Assia)
--	MF	POR	Vítor Pisco (on loan to (Portugal) G.D. Gafanha)
--	MF	CYP	Stavros Zevlaris (to P.O. Xylotymbou)

=== Omonia Aradippou ===
In:

No.	Pos.	Nation	Player
2	DF	CYP	Constantinos Aristotelous (from Apollon Limassol)
3	DF	CYP	Angelos Chrysostomou (loan extension from Omonia)
8	FW	CYP	Anastasios Okkaridis (on loan from APOEL U19)
9	FW	ROU	Adrian Pătulea (from (Romania) SSC Farul)
13	GK	CYP	Panayiotis Panayiotou (from Ayia Napa)
14	MF	ENG	Zenon Stylianides (from (England) Queens Park Rangers U23)
19	MF	CYP	Iakovos Kaiserlidis (on loan from AEK Larnaca)
20	MF	NED	Everton Pires Tavares (from (Netherlands) Kozakken Boys)
25	GK	POL	Mateusz Taudul (from AEZ Zakakiou)
33	MF	GRE	Vasilios Emmanouil (from Othellos Athienou)

Out:

No.	Pos.	Nation	Player
6	DF	CYP	Marios Georgiou (released)
14	FW	CYP	Sergis Avraam (to ASIL Lysi)
22	FW	GRE	Thomas Tsitas (to Othellos Athienou)
93	GK	AUT	Miroslav Orlic (to (Romania) UTA Arad)
94	MF	POL	Maxwell Ankomah (to AEZ Zakakiou)

=== Onisillos Sotira ===
In:

No.	Pos.	Nation	Player
1	GK	CYP	Panayiotis Panayi (from Ayia Napa U19)
6	MF	GRE	Petros Kaminiotis (from (Greece) Egaleo)
10	FW	FRA	Gaël N'Lundulu (from (Greece) AO Trikala)
11	FW	CIV	Christo Amessan (from (Portugal) Olhanense)
19	FW	CYP	Andreas Pittaras (from ASIL Lysi)
24	MF	UKR	Volodymyr Dmytrenko (on loan from Alki Oroklini)
26	DF	GRE	Stavros Nikolaou (from ASIL Lysi)
30	GK	CYP	Athos Chrysostomou (from Girne Halk Evi)
39	MF	CYP	Christos Kallis (from Digenis Oroklinis)
47	FW	GRE	Alexandros Zafirakis (from (Greece) Panegialios)
86	GK	GRE	Kiriakos Stratilatis (from Alki Oroklini)

Out:

No.	Pos.	Nation	Player
5	DF	CYP	Antonis Moushis (to P.O. Xylotymbou)
17	GK	CYP	Andreas Stylianou (released)
30	DF	CYP	Ioannis Kezos (to Achyronas Liopetriou)
95	GK	CYP	Andreas Loizou (to Ethnikos Achna)

=== Othellos Athienou ===
In:

No.	Pos.	Nation	Player
1	GK	CYP	Andreas Paraskeva (on loan from APOEL)
8	MF	POL	Bruno Zoladz (from (Poland) Stal Stalowa Wola)
9	FW	COL	David Solari (from Enosis Neon Paralimni)
11	FW	NED	Justin Johnson (free agent)
20	MF	CYP	Luka Mihajlovic (from Ormideia FC)
22	FW	GRE	Thomas Tsitas (from Omonia Aradippou)
23	GK	CYP	Zannetos Mytidis (from Digenis Oroklinis)
24	DF	CYP	Stelios Parpas (from Alki Oroklini)
33	MF	CYP	Christos Djamas (from PAEEK)
66	DF	CYP	Kleitos Costa (from Omonia U19)
88	MF	CYP	Sotiris Fiakas (from Omonia)
94	MF	FRA	Yoann Tribeau (from Olympiakos Nicosia)

Out:

No.	Pos.	Nation	Player
11	DF	CYP	Nicos Pitsillides (to Digenis Oroklinis)
19	FW	ARG	Leonel Altobelli (released)
20	FW	CYP	Andreas Nicolaou (to Digenis Oroklinis)
33	MF	GRE	Vasilios Emmanouil (to Omonia Aradippou)
77	DF	CYP	Panayiotis Panayiotou (to MEAP Nisou)
78	GK	CYP	Giorgos Loizou (to Doxa Katokopias)
90	MF	NED	Manuel Reangelo (to AEZ Zakakiou)

=== PAEEK ===
In:

No.	Pos.	Nation	Player
6	MF	CYP	Chrysovalantis Panayiotou (from THOI Lakatamia)
7	FW	GRE	Giorgos Lyras (from (Greece) Makedonikos)
8	MF	CMR	Roger Looga (from (Switzerland) FC Azzurri LS 90)
9	FW	SEN	Pape Ibrahima Diakhité (from (France) Aurillac)
10	FW	BRA	Fernando Henrique (from (Bulgaria) Oborishte)
13	FW	CYP	Theodoros Papanikolaou (from Digenis Oroklinis)
14	FW	CYP	Sozos Papacharalampous (on loan from Olympiakos Nicosia)
16	MF	CYP	Iasonas Orfanides (from Omonia U17)
17	MF	CYP	Constantinos Hadjittofi (from Digenis Akritas Morphou)
19	MF	CYP	Antonis Vassiliou (from Livadiakos/Salamina Livadion)
23	MF	CYP	Stefanos Charalambous (from Doxa Katokopias)
24	FW	CYP	Petros Kourou (from Digenis Oroklinis)
25	DF	CYP	Sergios Hadjidemetriou (from Livadiakos/Salamina Livadion)
26	MF	CYP	Michalis Ioannides (from THOI Lakatamia)
80	MF	CYP	Georgios Koutouna (from Digenis Oroklinis)

Out:

No.	Pos.	Nation	Player
2	DF	CYP	Giorgos Costa (to MEAP Nisou)
6	DF	AUS	Jacob Eliopoulos (to ASIL Lysi)
8	MF	CMR	Hervé Bodiong (to ASIL Lysi)
9	FW	ALB	Alexandros Bracjani (to ASIL Lysi)
12	MF	CYP	Sergios Panayiotou (to MEAP Nisou)
13	DF	CYP	Georgios Eleftheriou (to ASIL Lysi)
14	MF	CYP	Andreas Komodikis (loan return to Doxa Katokopias, now on loan to ASIL Lysi)
17	FW	GHA	Samad Oppong (to MEAP Nisou)
23	DF	CYP	Ioannis Stylianou (to THOI Lakatamia)
27	DF	CYP	Andreas Themistokleous (to Alki Oroklini, on loan to ASIL)
29	GK	GRE	Eleftherios Chatziadamidis (to MEAP Nisou)
32	DF	CYP	Andys Nikolaou (to Akritas Chlorakas, previously on loan from Doxa Katokopias)
33	MF	CYP	Christos Djamas (to Othellos Athienou)
77	MF	IRL	Vinny Faherty (to Olympias Lympion)
88	MF	CIV	Félicien Gbedinyessi (to ASIL Lysi)

=== THOI Lakatamia ===
In:

No.	Pos.	Nation	Player
1	GK	CYP	Constantinos Zacharoudiou (from ASIL Lysi)
4	DF	CYP	Alexandros Lemonaris (from Olympiakos Nicosia)
5	DF	CYP	Simeon Kittos (from Chalkanoras Idaliou)
7	DF	CYP	Christodoulos Kountouretis (from ASIL Lysi)
8	MF	CYP	Demetris Kyriakou (from ASIL Lysi)
10	MF	POR	Martim Galvão (from (United States) Nashville SC)
11	FW	CYP	Christoforos Xenofontos (from Ethnikos Assia)
12	FW	AUS	Jordan Figon (from (Australia) Rockdale City Suns)
14	DF	CYP	Christos Gavrielides (free agent)
19	DF	CYP	Giorgos Nicolaou (from (Greece) AO Sellana)
23	DF	CYP	Ioannis Stylianou (from PAEEK)
37	MF	SLO	Marko Rojc (from (Slovenia) NK Brda)
42	DF	GRE	Dimitrios Vosnakidis (from (Greece) AE Sparti)
66	DF	CYP	Konstantinos Kyriakou (on loan from AEL Limassol)
91	FW	ARM	David Hovsepyan (from (Slovakia) Komárno)
92	DF	CYP	Christoforos Charalambous (from Digenis Oroklinis)

Out:

No.	Pos.	Nation	Player
1	GK	CYP	Alexandre Negri (retired)
2	DF	CYP	Marios Theofanous (to Digenis Morphou)
4	MF	CYP	Chrysovalantis Panayiotou (to PAEEK)
6	DF	CYP	Sotiris Finiris (to Ethnikos Achna)
8	MF	CYP	Panayiotis Mikelli (released)
9	FW	GRE	Taxiarchis Thanelas (to Karmiotissa)
10	MF	CYP	Panayiotis Efthymiades (to Ethnikos Assia)
12	FW	PAR	Aldo Adorno (to P.O. Xylotymbou)
18	DF	CYP	Vassilis Kyriacou (to Omonia Psevda)
19	MF	CYP	Giorgos Siapanis (to MEAP Nisou)
20	DF	CYP	Stelios Mattheou (to ASIL Lysi)
26	MF	CYP	Michalis Ioannides (to PAEEK)
29	FW	CYP	Loukas Charalambous (to Elpida Astromeriti)
56	DF	CYP	Leonidas Kyriakou (loan return to Apollon Limassol)
77	FW	GRE	Stefanos Martsakis (to (Greece) O.F. Ierapetra)
