= List of Cypriot football transfers summer 2019 =

This is a list of Cypriot football transfers for the 2019–20 summer transfer window by club. Only transfers of clubs in the Cypriot First Division and Cypriot Second Division are included.

== Cypriot First Division ==
Note: Flags indicate national team as has been defined under FIFA eligibility rules. Players may hold more than one non-FIFA nationality.

=== AEK Larnaca ===
In:

No.	Pos.	Nation	Player
2	DF	ENG	Simranjit Thandi (from (England) Stoke City U23)
7	MF	CYP	Matija Špoljarić (from Apollon Limassol)
9	FW	ENG	Jozsef Keaveny (from (England) Leicester City U23)
14	MF	CRO	Ivan Fiolić (on loan from (Belgium) K.R.C. Genk)
15	MF	ARG	Facundo García (loan extension from (Spain) Leganés)
21	DF	ESP	Carles Planas (from (Spain) Girona)
27	DF	ESP	Raúl (from (Spain) CD Guijuelo)
40	GK	CYP	Ioannis Michael (loan return from Digenis Oroklinis)

Out:

No.	Pos.	Nation	Player
2	DF	BRA	Igor Silva (loan return to (Greece) Olympiacos)
3	DF	CYP	Marios Antoniades (on loan to Apollon Limassol)
6	DF	ESP	David Català (retired)
7	MF	ESP	Jorge Larena (released)
12	MF	CIV	Jean Luc Assoubre (to (Greece) AEL, previously on loan at (Greece) Lamia)
24	DF	CYP	Rafael Anastasiou (on loan to Onisilos Sotira 2014)
27	MF	CYP	Michalis Music (on loan to PO Xylotymbou, previously on loan at Ayia Napa)
29	FW	CYP	Ioannis Panayides (released)
34	MF	CYP	Iakovos Kaiserlidis (to Ermis Aradippou, previously on loan at Omonia Aradippou)
46	FW	VEN	Jeffrén Suárez (released)
80	FW	CYP	Onisiforos Roushias (to Enosis Neon Paralimni)
90	FW	ESP	Dani Aquino (loan return to (Spain) Real Murcia)

=== AEL Limassol ===
In:

No.	Pos.	Nation	Player
6	MF	SRB	Slobodan Medojević (free agent)
9	FW	BRA	Ivan Carlos (from Alki Oroklini)
10	MF	ARM	Gevorg Ghazaryan (from (Portugal) Chaves)
12	MF	CYP	Minas Antoniou (from APOEL)
14	MF	MAR	Ryan Mmaee (free agent)
17	FW	MKD	Kire Markoski (loan return from (Slovakia) Spartak Trnava)
19	FW	CYP	Yiannis Mavrou (loan return from Ermis Aradippou)
27	DF	MNE	Momčilo Rašo (loan return from (Latvia) FK Jelgava)
70	MF	CYP	Stylianos Panteli (loan return from (Latvia) FK Jelgava)
81	MF	CYP	Andreas Frangos (loan return from Enosis Neon Paralimni)

Out:

No.	Pos.	Nation	Player
6	MF	POR	Leandro Silva (on loan to (Portugal) Académica)
10	MF	BRA	Alex Da Silva (retired)
12	MF	CYP	Marios Nicolaou (released)
13	DF	HAI	Kevin Lafrance (to APOEL)
14	FW	CYP	Andreas Makris (loan return to APOEL)
15	MF	NGA	Fidelis Irhene (on loan to Doxa Katokopias)
26	MF	CYP	Markos Moustakis (on loan to Ypsonas FC)
28	MF	CYP	Marios Pechlivanis (to Ayia Napa, previously on loan at Aris Limassol)
35	FW	CYP	Marios Elia (to Ethnikos Achna, previously on loan at Alki Oroklini)
45	DF	CYP	Andreas Kyriakou (to Enosis Neon Paralimni, previously on loan)
66	DF	CYP	Konstantinos Kyriakou (to Enosis Neon Paralimni, previously on loan at Enosis Neon THOI Lakatamia)
71	MF	ESP	Dani Benítez (to (Spain) Poblense)
71	FW	CYP	Michalis Constantinides (on loan to Ypsonas FC)
77	MF	CUW	Jarchinio Antonia (to (Netherlands) SC Cambuur)
93	FW	SVK	Ivan Schranz (to (Czech Republic) České Budějovice)
98	MF	CYP	Andreas Neofytou (to Karmiotissa, previously on loan)

=== Anorthosis Famagusta ===
In:

No.	Pos.	Nation	Player
1	GK	GEO	Georgi Loria (from (Germany) 1. FC Magdeburg)
3	DF	GRE	Georgios Galitsios (from (Belgium) Mouscron)
4	MF	CYP	Kostakis Artymatas (from APOEL)
8	MF	GEO	Murtaz Daushvili (from (Hungary) Szombathelyi Haladás)
11	MF	GEO	Tornike Okriashvili (from (Russia) FC Krasnodar)
12	DF	CYP	Kostas Pileas (loan return from Ermis Aradippou)
15	FW	GRE	Giorgos Manthatis (on loan from (Greece) Olympiacos)
16	MF	GRE	Theodoros Vasilakakis (from (Greece) Atromitos)
19	FW	FIN	Berat Sadik (from (Spain) Gimnàstic)
20	FW	GRE	Nikos Kaltsas (from (Greece) Asteras Tripolis)
22	DF	CRO	Branko Vrgoč (from (Israel) Maccabi Netanya)
23	DF	CYP	Marios Stylianou (from Ermis Aradippou)
26	FW	CYP	Ioannis Chadjivasilis (from Doxa Katokopias)
28	MF	CYP	Margaça (from Nea Salamis Famagusta)
30	GK	CYP	Antonis Georgallides (from Olympiakos Nicosia)
33	DF	UKR	Yevhen Selin (from (Hungary) MTK Budapest)
44	DF	CYP	Pavlos Correa (loan return from Aris Limassol)
45	DF	CYP	Constantinos Soteriou (loan return from Doxa Katokopias)
91	GK	CYP	Giorgos Papadopoulos (from Ermis Aradippou)

Out:

No.	Pos.	Nation	Player
--	DF	CRO	Drago Lovrić (to (Croatia) NK HAŠK, previously on loan at Ethnikos Achna)
-	DF	CYP	Marios Nicolaou (on loan to Ayia Napa, previously on loan at Anagennisi Deryneia)
6	DF	SVK	Andraž Struna (to (Romania) FC Voluntari)
11	DF	FRA	Vincent Bessat (to Apollon Limassol)
15	MF	SUI	Oliver Buff (released)
17	FW	GEO	Beka Mikeltadze (to (Russia) Rubin Kazan)
19	MF	BRA	João Victor (to (Qatar) Umm Salal)
23	MF	CYP	Giorgos Economides (to Olympiakos Nicosia)
25	GK	CRO	Ivan Vargić (loan return to (Italy) Lazio)
32	DF	CRO	Danijel Pranjić (to Ayia Napa)
38	MF	CYP	Nikolas Panayiotou (to Omonia)
39	MF	CYP	Christos Hadjipaschalis (on loan to ASIL, previously on loan at Aris Limassol)
45	DF	CYP	Constantinos Soteriou (to Olympiakos Nicosia)
94	FW	ARG	Nicolás Stefanelli (loan return to (Sweden) AIK)
97	GK	AUT	David Stemmer (to (Austria) FC Wacker)
98	GK	NGA	Francis Uzoho (loan return to (Spain) Deportivo La Coruña)
99	GK	CYP	Demetris Demetriou (to Apollon Limassol)

=== APOEL ===
In:

No.	Pos.	Nation	Player
—	FW	BRA	Ítalo (from (Brazil) Ponte Preta)
—	DF	CYP	Stefanos Mouhtaris (from Doxa Katokopias)
9	FW	SWE	Linus Hallenius (from (Sweden) GIF Sundsvall)
13	DF	HAI	Kevin Lafrance (from AEL Limassol)
14	MF	SRB	Uroš Matić (on loan from (Denmark) F.C. Copenhagen)
19	MF	JOR	Omar Hani (from (Jordan) Al-Faisaly)
20	FW	SRB	Andrija Pavlović (on loan from (Austria) SK Rapid Wien)
23	MF	POR	Joãozinho (from (Portugal) C.D. Tondela)
27	GK	SVN	Vid Belec (on loan from (Italy) U.C. Sampdoria)
33	FW	CYP	Andreas Makris (loan return from AEL Limassol)
55	DF	CYP	Christos Shelis (from (England) Shrewsbury Town)
90	DF	SRB	Vujadin Savić (from (Serbia) Red Star Belgrade)
91	MF	SUI	Dragan Mihajlović (from (Switzerland) FC Lugano)
95	MF	POR	Alef (on loan from (Portugal) S.C. Braga)

Out:

No.	Pos.	Nation	Player
—	DF	CYP	Stefanos Mouhtaris (on loan to Doxa Katokopias)
—	FW	CYP	Anastasios Okkaridis (on loan to Omonia Psevda, previously on loan at Omonia Aradippou)
—	FW	CYP	Michalis Charalambous (to Anagennisi Deryneia, previously on loan at (Portugal) Varzim)
—	FW	BRA	Ítalo (on loan to Doxa Katokopias)
1	GK	VEN	Rafael Romo (to (Denmark) Silkeborg)
2	DF	CYP	Kypros Christoforou (to Nea Salamis Famagusta, previously on loan)
3	DF	BRA	Caju (loan return to (Brazil) Santos)
4	MF	CYP	Kostakis Artymatas (to Anorthosis Famagusta)
9	FW	IRN	Reza Ghoochannejhad (to (Netherlands) PEC Zwolle, previously on loan at (Australia) Sydney FC)
13	DF	HAI	Kevin Lafrance (on loan to Pafos FC)
16	FW	CYP	Andreas Katsantonis (on loan to Ayia Napa)
17	MF	NOR	Ghayas Zahid (on loan to (Greece) Panathinaikos)
18	MF	CYP	Andreas Artemiou (on loan to Ayia Napa)
22	MF	CYP	Minas Antoniou (to AEL Limassol, previously on loan at Enosis Neon Paralimni)
23	MF	ARG	Juan Cascini (loan return to (Argentina) Estudiantes)
26	MF	POR	Nuno Morais (retired)
35	MF	CYP	Paris Polycarpou (on loan to ASIL)
37	DF	BRA	Constantinos Karayiannis (on loan to Alki Oroklini)
37	FW	BRA	Léo Natel (loan return to (Brazil) São Paulo)
45	DF	SUI	Mickaël Facchinetti (to (Switzerland) FC Sion)
49	FW	BRA	Dellatorre (to (Thailand) Suphanburi)
50	DF	BRA	Carlão (loan return to (Italy) Torino)
77	FW	HUN	Norbert Balogh (loan return to (Italy) Palermo)
93	GK	CYP	Neofytos Michael (on loan to (Greece) Asteras Tripolis, previously on loan at (Greece) PAS Giannina)
98	GK	CYP	Andreas Paraskeva (on loan to Doxa Katokopias, previously on loan at Othellos Athienou)

=== Apollon Limassol ===
In:

No.	Pos.	Nation	Player
-	MF	CYP	Nikolas Mattheou (from (Greece) PAOK, previously on loan at (Greece) Karaiskakis)
2	DF	EQG	Emilio Nsue (free agent)
3	DF	CYP	Marios Antoniades (on loan from AEK Larnaca)
8	DF	FRA	Vincent Bessat (from Anorthosis Famagusta)
9	FW	CYP	Ioannis Pittas (loan return from Enosis Neon Paralimni)
13	GK	FIN	Samu Volotinen (from (Bosnia and Herzegovina) Čelik Zenica)
18	MF	ESP	Diego Aguirre (from (Spain) Real Zaragoza)
20	FW	GRE	Giannis Gianniotas (from (Greece) AEK Athens)
36	GK	SUI	Joël Mall (from Pafos FC)
41	DF	HUN	Attila Szalai (from (Hungary) Mezőkövesd)
64	MF	CYP	Michalis Genethliou (loan return from Karmiotissa)
87	MF	TOG	Serge Gakpé (from (Belgium) Cercle Brugge)
94	FW	TRI	Daniel Carr (from (Republic of Ireland) Shamrock Rovers)
95	MF	FRA	Roger Tamba M'Pinda (from (Italy) Juventus U23)
99	GK	CYP	Demetris Demetriou (from Anorthosis Famagusta)

Out:

No.	Pos.	Nation	Player
-	MF	CYP	Nikolas Mattheou (on loan to Aris Limassol)
6	DF	CYP	Andreas Karo (to (Italy) S.S. Lazio, previously on loan at Pafos FC)
8	MF	MRI	Kévin Bru (to (Romania) FC Dinamo București)
9	FW	FRA	David Faupala (to (Norway) FK Jerv)
15	DF	BFA	Dylan Ouédraogo (to (Belgium) OH Leuven)
16	MF	CYP	Matija Špoljarić (to AEK Larnaca, previously on loan return at Alki Oroklini)
19	MF	GAM	Mustapha Carayol (to (Turkey) Adana Demirspor)
28	DF	CYP	Marios Stylianou (to Anorthosis Famagusta)
30	FW	MLT	André Schembri (to (India) Chennaiyin FC)
37	DF	CZE	Milan Kerbr (to (Czech Republic) SK Sigma Olomouc)
46	GK	CYP	Anastasios Kissas (to Nea Salamina)
50	FW	CYP	Ioannis Vassiliades (on loan at Karmiotissa)
51	DF	CYP	Constantinos Papamichael (on loan at Karmiotissa)
60	MF	CYP	Antonis Mitas (on loan at Anagennisi Deryneia)
63	MF	CYP	Danilo Špoljarić (on loan to Enosis Neon Paralimni)
70	GK	CYP	Michalis Papastylianou (on loan to Aris Limassol)
83	GK	POR	Bruno Vale (to (Portugal) U.D. Oliveirense)
96	MF	BEL	Luca Polizzi (to (Belgium) Rupel Boom, previously on loan at Pafos FC)

=== Doxa Katokopias ===
In:

No.	Pos.	Nation	Player
5	DF	CYP	Stefanos Mouhtaris (on loan from APOEL)
6	DF	FRA	Dorian Dervite (from (Belgium) R. Charleroi S.C., previously on loan at NAC Breda)
7	MF	POR	Zé Valente (from (Portugal) Vizela)
8	MF	NGA	Fidelis Irhene (on loan from AEL Limassol)
9	FW	BRA	Ítalo (on loan from APOEL)
21	MF	POR	Carlitos (from (Kazakhstan) FC Kaisar)
24	MF	MKD	Dushko Trajchevski (from Alki Oroklini)
30	DF	CYP	Vasilis Demosthenous (from (Czech Republic) Olympia Radotín)
31	GK	CYP	Andreas Paraskeva (on loan from APOEL, previously on loan at Othellos Athienou)
40	MF	CYP	Marcos Charalambous (from (United States) Flint City Bucks)
70	MF	GNB	Mesca (from (Bulgaria) Beroe Stara Zagora)
77	DF	CYP	Constantinos Mintikkis (from Nea Salamis Famagusta)
83	FW	BRA	Carlão (from (Thailand) Samut Prakan City)
93	DF	CYP	Martinos Christofi (from Alki Oroklini)
95	MF	BRA	Lukas Brambilla (from (Greece) Apollon Larissa)

Out:

No.	Pos.	Nation	Player
—	MF	CYP	Andreas Komodikis (to ASIL, previously on loan)
2	DF	POR	Joel Pereira (to Omonia)
4	DF	FRA	Lamine Ba (released)
5	DF	CYP	Stefanos Mouhtaris (to APOEL)
6	MF	ROU	Răzvan Tincu (to (Romania) Sepsi Sfântu Gheorghe)
8	MF	GUI	Jean Charles Fernandez (to ASIL)
13	FW	ROU	Paul Batin (to (Romania) Concordia Chiajna)
15	FW	FRA	Dylan Bikey (to (Scotland) Stirling Albion, previously on loan at (France) JA Drancy)
19	FW	CYP	Ioannis Chadjivasilis (to Anorthosis Famagusta)
26	DF	CYP	Zacharias Adoni (on loan to ASIL)
28	FW	UKR	Yevhen Pavlov (to (Serbia) FK Radnik)
29	DF	ROU	Bogdan Mitrea (to (Slovakia) Spartak Trnava)
44	DF	CYP	Constantinos Soteriou (loan return to Anorthosis Famagusta)
55	DF	BRA	Nelsinho (to (Portugal) Vilafranquense)
61	GK	CYP	Antonis Mavrantonis (to Digenis Morphou, previously on loan at MEAP Nisou)
78	GK	CYP	Giorgos Loizou (to Othellos Athienou)

=== Enosis Neon Paralimni ===
In:

No.	Pos.	Nation	Player
-	FW	NGA	Marcus Chinecherem Okwukogu (free agent)
4	DF	MKD	Risto Mitrevski (from (Israel) Hapoel Haifa)
6	MF	BUL	Orlin Starokin (from Alki Oroklini)
7	MF	URU	Nico Varela (free agent)
9	FW	POL	Mateusz Szczepaniak (from (Poland) Miedź Legnica)
11	MF	CYP	Demetris Theodorou (from Omonia Aradippou)
20	FW	CYP	Onisiforos Roushias (from AEK Larnaca)
21	MF	BRA	Cal (from (Brazil) Ferroviário)
22	MF	CYP	Danilo Špoljarić (on loan from Apollon Limassol)
23	MF	GHA	Ernest Agyiri (on loan from (England) Manchester City)
45	DF	CYP	Andreas Kyriakou (from AEL Limassol, previously on loan)
66	DF	CYP	Konstantinos Kyriakou (from AEL Limassol)
98	GK	CYP	Evangelos Georgiou (free agent)

Out:

No.	Pos.	Nation	Player
-	FW	CYP	Johny El Zein (to Aris Limassol)
3	DF	FRA	Magatte Sarr (on loan to Ermis Aradippou)
6	MF	CMR	Eyong Enoh (to Olympiakos Nicosia)
7	MF	RUS	Aleksandr Shcherbakov (loan return to (Russia) Ural Yekaterinburg)
9	FW	CYP	Georgios Kolokoudias (to Ayia Napa)
10	FW	ARG	Gonzalo Zárate (to (Switzerland) FC Black Stars)
17	MF	CYP	Rafael Eleftheriou (on loan to Ayia Napa)
21	DF	ARG	Maximiliano Oliva (to (Argentina) CA Alvarado)
22	MF	CYP	Minas Antoniou (loan return to APOEL)
31	FW	DEN	Morten Rasmussen (retired)
44	FW	CRO	Dominik Glavina (to (Croatia) NK Varaždin)
55	DF	GRE	Sokratis Fytanidis (to (Greece) Levadiakos)
77	FW	CYP	Ioannis Pittas (loan return to Apollon Limassol)
80	MF	CYP	Andreas Frangos (loan return to AEL Limassol)
99	FW	ISR	Shoval Gozlan (loan return to (Israel) Maccabi Netanya)

=== Ethnikos Achna ===
In:

No.	Pos.	Nation	Player
5	DF	MTQ	Christopher Glombard (from (France) Tours)
8	MF	POR	Miguelito (from (Portugal) Amarante)
9	FW	CYP	Marios Elia (from AEL Limassol, previously on loan at Alki Oroklini)
11	MF	CYP	Demetris Charalambous (from Omonia Aradippou)
13	DF	BRA	Deyvison (from (Portugal) Arouca)
14	MF	CYP	Vincent Laban (free agent)
23	FW	MKD	Jovan Kostovski (from (Belgium) OH Leuven)
25	MF	CYP	Demetris Kyprianou (from Alki Oroklini)
86	GK	GRE	Kiriakos Stratilatis (from Onisilos Sotira 2014)
97	FW	UKR	Illya Markovskyy (on loan from (Greece) PAOK, previously on loan at (Greece) Trikala)
99	FW	CMR	Ibrahim Koneh (free agent)

Out:

No.	Pos.	Nation	Player
2	DF	CYP	Nicolas Fotiou (to Onisilos Sotira 2014)
4	DF	CRO	Davor Rogač (to (Croatia) NK Lučko)
5	MF	BRA	Eduardo Pincelli (to Omonia Aradippou)
8	FW	GRE	Christos Marathonitis (to Onisilos Sotira 2014)
9	FW	CYP	Andreas Kyprianou (to Othellos Athienou)
16	MF	MKD	Nikola Gligorov (released)
20	MF	CYP	Chrysovalantis Kapartis (on loan to ASIL)
70	FW	CYP	Prodomos Therapontos (to Digenis Morphou)
95	GK	CYP	Andreas Loizou (to PO Xylotymbou)

=== Nea Salamis Famagusta ===
In:

No.	Pos.	Nation	Player
-	MF	CYP	Marios Demetriou (from Omonia)
4	DF	ESP	Jordi López (from (Spain) Unión Adarve)
8	MF	SRB	Saša Marjanović (from (Kazakhstan) Aktobe)
9	FW	ENG	Jay Simpson (from (England) Leyton Orient)
14	DF	ARG	José San Román (free agent)
18	FW	BRA	Maurício Cordeiro (from (Brazil) Vitória)
19	DF	BEL	Benjamin Lambot (from (Belgium) Cercle Brugge)
21	MF	CYP	Kyriacos Panagi (from Aris Limassol)
23	DF	GRE	Savvas Tsabouris (from (Greece) Levadiakos)
24	DF	CYP	Kypros Christoforou (from APOEL, previously on loan)
30	GK	CYP	Anastasios Kissas (from Apollon Limassol)

Out:

No.	Pos.	Nation	Player
2	DF	CYP	Constantinos Sergiou (on loan to Ayia Napa)
4	DF	ESP	Román Golobart (to (Israel) Maccabi Netanya)
6	DF	ESP	Agus (to (India) ATK)
7	FW	ESP	Toni Dovale (to (Thailand) Navy, previously on at (India) East Bengal)
9	FW	AUT	Daniel Sikorski (to (Spain) CD Guijuelo)
13	DF	BRA	Jaílson Araújo (to (Portugal) C.D. Aves)
19	FW	CYP	Iasonas Piki (on loan to PO Xylotymbou)
28	MF	CYP	Margaça (to Anorthosis Famagusta)
44	DF	CYP	Andreas Fragkeskou (loan return to Omonia)
70	FW	BRA	Thiago (to AC Omonia)
77	DF	CYP	Constantinos Mintikkis (to Doxa Katokopias)

=== Olympiakos Nicosia ===
In:

No.	Pos.	Nation	Player
1	GK	BUL	Mario Kirev (from (Kosovo) FC Drita)
2	DF	CYP	Paris Psaltis (from Ermis Aradippou)
3	DF	GNB	Sambinha (from (Italy) A.C.R. Messina)
4	DF	GUI	Ousmane Sidibé (from (France) Béziers)
5	DF	POR	Kiko (from (Portugal) F.C. Arouca)
6	MF	CMR	Eyong Enoh (from Enosis Neon Paralimni)
8	MF	VEN	Rafael Acosta (from Alki Oroklini)
10	MF	CYP	Giorgos Economides (from Anorthosis Famagusta)
11	MF	CMR	Fabrice Kah (from (Portugal) U.D. Leiria)
16	MF	BRA	Vinícius (from (Iran) Sanat Naft)
18	MF	CMR	Landry (from (Portugal) CD Alcains)
20	FW	CYP	Panayiotis Zachariou (from Pafos FC)
26	FW	BRA	Azulão (from (Angola) Petro de Luanda)
28	DF	CYP	Constantinos Soteriou (from Anorthosis Famagusta)
32	MF	CYP	Evangelos Kyriacou (from Anagennisi Deryneia)
77	MF	ALG	Bilal Hamdi (from (Azerbaijan) Sabail FK)
91	GK	SVK	Pavol Bajza (from (Denmark) Vejle Boldklub)
93	MF	FRA	Dylan Duventru (from (Azerbaijan) Sabail FK)
99	FW	TOG	Jonathan Ayité (from (Azerbaijan) Keşla FK)

Out:

No.	Pos.	Nation	Player
--	MF	POR	Vítor Pisco (to (Portugal) União Madeira, previously on loan at (Portugal) Cinfães)
-	FW	CYP	Sozos Papacharalampous (to Digenis Morphou, previously on loan at PAEEK)
4	DF	CYP	Angelos Pouyioukkas (to Digenis Morphou)
5	DF	BRA	João Leonardo (to Digenis Morphou)
6	MF	AUT	Thomas Piermayr (to (Austria) SC Wiener Neustadt)
8	MF	CYP	Alex Konstantinou (to Pafos FC)
9	FW	VEN	José Romo (on loan to Karmiotissa)
10	MF	POR	Fábio Vieira (to (Portugal) Beira-Mar)
11	MF	CYP	Yiannis Pachipis (to Alki Oroklini)
20	FW	AUT	Samuel Oppong (to (Austria) Kapfenberger SV)
22	MF	GRE	Theodoros Mingos (to (Greece) OFI Crete)
23	DF	CYP	Constantinos Samaras (on loan to Ermis Aradippou)
27	MF	CYP	Evgenios Antoniou (on loan to Ermis Aradippou)
24	DF	CYP	Ioannis Savva (to Karmiotissa)
33	GK	CYP	Antonis Georgallides (to Anorthosis Famagusta)
72	FW	CYP	Ioannis Andreou (to Omonia Aradippou)
77	MF	POR	Diogo Ramos (to Karmiotissa)
93	DF	CYP	Vasilis Papageorgiou (to Othellos Athienou)

=== Omonia ===
In:

No.	Pos.	Nation	Player
2	DF	POR	Joel Pereira (from Doxa Katokopias)
6	DF	CZE	Michael Lüftner (on loan from (Denmark) F.C. Copenhagen)
7	FW	VEN	Miku (from (India) Bengaluru)
8	MF	POR	Vítor Gomes (from (Portugal) C.D. Aves)
9	FW	GRE	Dimitris Kolovos (from (Belgium) Mechelen, previously on loan)
11	MF	FRA	Éric Bauthéac (free agent)
15	DF	SVK	Tomáš Hubočan (free agent)
17	DF	CZE	Jan Lecjaks (from (Croatia) Dinamo Zagreb, previously on loan at (Croatia) NK Lokomotiva)
18	MF	ISR	Hen Ezra (from (Israel) Hapoel Be'er Sheva)
20	MF	COL	Michael Ortega (from (United Arab Emirates) Baniyas)
22	DF	HUN	Ádám Lang (from (Romania) CFR Cluj)
23	GK	NGA	Francis Uzoho (on loan from (Spain) Deportivo de La Coruña, previously on loan at Anorthosis Famagusta)
28	MF	POR	Rúben Alves (from (Portugal) F.C. Felgueiras)
30	MF	CYP	Nikolas Panayiotou (from Anorthosis Famagusta)
40	GK	BRA	Fabiano (free agent)
68	DF	CYP	Andreas Fragkeskou (loan return from Nea Salamis Famagusta)
70	FW	BRA	Thiago (from Nea Salamis Famagusta)
98	GK	CYP	Charalambos Kyriakides (from Aris Limassol)

Out:

No.	Pos.	Nation	Player
-	DF	CYP	Foivos Christodoulou (to Ethnikos Assia, previously on loan at MEAP Nisou)
-	MF	CYP	Marios Demetriou (to Nea Salamis Famagusta, previously on loan at Ermis Aradippou)
5	DF	FRA	Mickaël Gaffoor (to (Spain) FC Andorra)
7	DF	ITA	Marco Motta (released)
8	MF	POR	Alex Soares (to (Portugal) Moreirense)
9	FW	GRE	Dimitris Kolovos (to (Greece) Panathinaikos)
11	MF	ESP	Juanan Entrena (to (Spain) Melilla)
15	DF	ESP	Alberto Lora (to (Spain) Marino de Luanco)
17	MF	ESP	Cris Montes (on loan to (Spain) Badalona)
20	MF	NGA	Abdul Jeleel Ajagun (loan return to (Belgium) Kortrijk)
21	MF	SVN	Saša Živec (to (Poland) Zagłębie Lubin)
23	MF	CMR	Raoul Loé (released)
24	FW	CRC	David Ramírez (on loan to (Costa Rica) Deportivo Saprissa)
26	DF	GRE	Loukas Vyntra (to (Greece) PAS Lamia)
25	GK	ESP	Tomás Mejías (to (England) Middlesbrough)
28	MF	POR	Rúben Alves (released)
30	GK	SWE	John Alvbåge (to (Sweden) IK Sirius, previously on at Nea Salamis Famagusta)
62	DF	CYP	Angelos Chrysostomou (to Anagennisi Deryneia, previously on loan at Omonia Aradippou)
64	FW	CYP	Apollonas Vasiliou (to Ethnikos Assia, previously on loan at Alki Oroklini)
66	GK	CYP	Alexandros Antoniou (on loan to Ermis Aradippou)
71	DF	CRO	Franjo Prce (to (Ukraine) Karpaty Lviv)
73	DF	BUL	Hristian Foti (to Alki Oroklini)

=== Pafos FC ===
In:

No.	Pos.	Nation	Player
1	GK	UKR	Artur Rudko (from (Ukraine) Dynamo Kyiv)
3	DF	URU	Joaquín Varela (from (Uruguay) Fénix)
6	MF	NGA	Sunny (free agent)
7	MF	USA	Danny Williams (free agent)
9	FW	FRA	Kévin Bérigaud (loan return from (Latvia) Riga)
11	MF	CYP	Alex Konstantinou (from Olympiakos Nicosia)
13	DF	HAI	Kevin Lafrance (on loan from APOEL)
14	MF	CYP	Gerasimos Fylaktou (from Ermis Aradippou)
15	DF	GRE	Giorgos Valerianos (from (Greece) Aris Thessaloniki)
17	MF	SWE	Nahir Besara (from (Saudi Arabia) Al-Fayha)
18	DF	FRA	Mickaël Panos (from (France) Saint-Étienne)
21	MF	JPN	Cy Goddard (on loan from (Italy) Benevento)
23	DF	FIN	Paulus Arajuuri (from (Denmark) Brøndby)
26	FW	MLI	Bakary Sako (free agent)
28	FW	ANG	Vá (from (Angola) Petro de Luanda)
32	FW	ARG	Marcelo Torres (on loan from (Argentina) Boca Juniors, previously on loan at (Argentina) CA Banfield)
42	MF	ENG	Jason Puncheon (from (England) Crystal Palace, previously on loan at (England) Huddersfield)
52	GK	LVA	Reinis Reinholds (on loan from (Italy) AC Pisa)
87	FW	ENG	Nikita Dubov (free agent)
91	MF	CPV	Jerson Cabral (from (Bulgaria) Levski Sofia)

Out:

No.	Pos.	Nation	Player
1	GK	SUI	Joël Mall (to Apollon Limassol)
2	DF	CYP	Andreas Karo (loan return to Apollon Limassol)
3	DF	SCO	Kevin Holt (to (Scotland) Queen of the South)
6	DF	BRA	Lorran (to (Brazil) Serra Macaense)
11	FW	CYP	Panayiotis Zachariou (to Olympiakos Nicosia)
15	DF	GRE	Giorgos Valerianos (short term loan to (Latvia) Riga)
16	MF	NOR	Abdisalam Ibrahim (short term loan to (Latvia) Riga)
21	DF	BRA	Jander (to (Serbia) Red Star Belgrade)
24	MF	BEL	Jens Cools (to (Belgium) Eupen)
25	MF	CZE	Zdeněk Folprecht (on loan to (Czech Republic) Zlín)
26	DF	DEN	Patrick Banggaard (loan return to (Germany) SV Darmstadt 98)
44	MF	CRO	Diego Živulić (to (Poland) Śląsk Wrocław)
53	MF	NED	Simo Choukoud (released)
70	MF	COL	Brayan Angulo (loan return to (Colombia) América de Cali)
90	DF	RUS	Aleksandr Dovbnya (to (Russia) Arsenal Tula)
92	FW	LVA	Deniss Rakels (on loan to (Latvia) Riga)
96	MF	BEL	Luca Polizzi (loan return to Apollon Limassol)
98	GK	GRE	Giannis Angelopoulos (released)
