= List of Cypriot football transfers winter 2018–19 =

This is a list of Cypriot football transfers for the 2018–19 winter transfer window by club. Only transfers of clubs in the Cypriot First Division and Cypriot Second Division are included.

== Cypriot First Division ==
Note: Flags indicate national team as has been defined under FIFA eligibility rules. Players may hold more than one non-FIFA nationality.

=== AEK Larnaca ===
In:

No.	Pos.	Nation	Player
22	MF	ESP	Lluís Sastre (from (Spain) Huesca)
46	MF	VEN	Jeffrén Suárez (from (Switzerland) Grasshopper)
90	FW	ESP	Dani Aquino (on loan from (Spain) Real Murcia)

Out:

No.	Pos.	Nation	Player
10	MF	ESP	Joan Tomàs (to (Greece) Lamia)
20	MF	CYP	Vincent Laban (released)
21	MF	CIV	Jean Luc Assoubre (on loan to (Greece) Lamia)

=== AEL Limassol ===
In:

No.	Pos.	Nation	Player
21	DF	SVK	Boris Godál (from (Slovakia) Spartak Trnava)
77	FW	CUW	Jarchinio Antonia (from Omonia)
93	FW	SVK	Ivan Schranz (from (Czech Republic) Dukla Prague)
99	MF	CRO	Adnan Aganović (from (Turkey) Altay S.K.)

Out:

No.	Pos.	Nation	Player
17	FW	MKD	Kire Markoski (on loan to (Slovakia) Spartak Trnava)
23	FW	ESP	Joan Román (to (Poland) Miedź Legnica)
70	MF	CYP	Stylianos Panteli (on loan to (Latvia) FK Jelgava)

=== Alki Oroklini ===
In:

No.	Pos.	Nation	Player
--	FW	CIV	Ismaël Béko Fofana (from (Serbia) Vojvodina)
44	FW	LBR	Theo Weeks (from (Oman) Mirbat Club)
89	FW	SEN	Alioune Badará (free agent)
94	MF	FRA	Yoann Tribeau (from Othellos Athienou)

Out:

No.	Pos.	Nation	Player
--	FW	CIV	Ismaël Béko Fofana (to (Azerbaijan) Zira FK)
4	DF	CYP	Alexis Theocharous (on loan to Othellos Athienou)
9	FW	BRA	Marlon Silva (to (Thailand) Ubon United)
19	MF	AUS	Bai Antoniou (on loan to Onisilos Sotira 2014)

=== Anorthosis Famagusta ===
In:

No.	Pos.	Nation	Player
8	MF	CYP	Andreas Lemesios (on loan from Nea Salamis Famagusta)
15	MF	SUI	Oliver Buff (from (Spain) Real Zaragoza)
94	FW	ARG	Nicolás Stefanelli (on loan from (Sweden) AIK)
98	GK	NGR	Francis Uzoho (on loan from (Spain) Deportivo La Coruña, previously on loan at (Spain) Elche)

Out:

No.	Pos.	Nation	Player
24	FW	CIV	Sekou Cissé (released)
28	DF	CYP	Constantinos Soteriou (on loan to Doxa Katokopias)
44	MF	SRB	Gojko Kačar (released)

=== Apollon Limassol ===
In:

No.	Pos.	Nation	Player
4	DF	SRB	Vahid Selimović (from (France) FC Metz)
37	DF	CZE	Milan Kerbr (from (Czech Republic) Slovan Liberec)

Out:

No.	Pos.	Nation	Player
99	FW	CRO	Anton Maglica (to (China) Guizhou Hengfeng)

=== APOEL ===
In:

No.	Pos.	Nation	Player
45	DF	SUI	Mickaël Facchinetti (from (Switzerland) FC Thun)
70	MF	CRO	Antonio Jakoliš (from (Romania) FCSB)
71	FW	POR	André Vidigal (on loan from (Netherlands) Fortuna Sittard)
89	FW	SLO	Roman Bezjak (from (Poland) Jagiellonia Białystok)

Out:

No.	Pos.	Nation	Player
2	DF	GEQ	Emilio Nsue (contract broken)
9	FW	IRI	Reza Ghoochannejhad (on loan to (Australia) Sydney FC)
11	DF	CYP	Nektarios Alexandrou (to Doxa Katokopias)
20	MF	CYP	Alex Konstantinou (to Olympiakos Nicosia)
21	DF	BUL	Zhivko Milanov (to (Bulgaria) Levski Sofia)
22	MF	CYP	Minas Antoniou (on loan to Enosis Neon Paralimni)

=== Doxa Katokopias ===
In:

No.	Pos.	Nation	Player
13	FW	ROU	Paul Batin (from (Romania) Concordia Chiajna)
20	DF	CYP	Nektarios Alexandrou (from APOEL)
22	DF	ESP	Alfonso Artabe (free agent)
44	DF	CYP	Constantinos Soteriou (on loan from Anorthosis Famagusta)

Out:

No.	Pos.	Nation	Player
3	DF	CYP	Ioannis Efstathiou (to Ethnikos Achna)
9	FW	FIN	Berat Sadik (to (Spain) Gimnàstic)
66	MF	CYP	Andreas Pachipis (to Olympiakos Nicosia)

=== Enosis Neon Paralimni ===
In:

No.	Pos.	Nation	Player
22	MF	CYP	Minas Antoniou (on loan from APOEL)
44	FW	CRO	Dominik Glavina (from (Romania) Universitatea Craiova)
55	DF	GRE	Sokratis Fytanidis (free agent)
99	FW	ISR	Shoval Gozlan (on loan from (Israel) Maccabi Netanya)

Out:

No.	Pos.	Nation	Player
11	MF	CYP	Kyriacos Pavlou (to PO Xylotymbou)
23	DF	ESP	Borja Ekiza (released)
24	DF	USA	Riley Grant (released)
30	DF	CYP	Eleftherios Mertakas (to Ayia Napa)
37	FW	ENG	Omar Rowe (to Ayia Napa)

=== Ermis Aradippou ===
In:

No.	Pos.	Nation	Player
17	FW	BUL	Dimitar Makriev (from (Bulgaria) Arda Kardzhali)
26	MF	GRE	Anastasios Lagos (free agent)
41	DF	CGO	Francis N'Ganga (from (Belgium) Sporting Charleroi)
70	FW	GEQ	Kike Boula (free agent)

Out:

No.	Pos.	Nation	Player
2	DF	FRA	Herold Goulon (to (Malaysia) Pahang FA)
3	DF	MNE	Vladimir Volkov (to (Montenegro) FK Rad)
11	FW	RUS	Nikolai Kipiani (loan return to Omonia)
19	FW	GUI	Sekou Keita (to (France) Stade Laval)
20	FW	CMR	Marcel Essombé (released)
42	DF	POR	Sandro Sakho (to (Portugal) Vitória de Setúbal)

=== Nea Salamis Famagusta ===
In:

No.	Pos.	Nation	Player
6	DF	ESP	Agus (from (Denmark) Esbjerg fB)
13	DF	BRA	Jaílson (from Omonia)
20	MF	SCO	Alastair Reynolds (free agent)
90	FW	LBR	Tonia Tisdell (from (Turkey) Denizlispor)

Out:

No.	Pos.	Nation	Player
7	FW	ESP	Toni Dovale (on loan to (India) East Bengal)
8	MF	CYP	Andreas Lemesios (on loan to Anorthosis Famagusta)
11	MF	BFA	Stephane Aziz Ki (released)
15	MF	ARG	Federico Domínguez (to (Bolivia) Real Potosí)
16	MF	CYP	Zacharias Theodorou (to Onisilos Sotira 2014)

=== Omonia ===
In:

No.	Pos.	Nation	Player
--	FW	RUS	Nikolai Kipiani (loan return from Ermis Aradippou)
9	FW	GRE	Dimitris Kolovos (on loan from (Belgium) Mechelen, previously on loan at (Netherlands) Willem)
20	MF	NGR	Abdul Jeleel Ajagun (on loan from (Belgium) Kortrijk)
35	MF	GRE	Charalampos Mavrias (from (Scotland) Hibernian)

Out:

No.	Pos.	Nation	Player
4	MF	MEX	Jorge Enríquez (released)
10	MF	URU	Juan Ángel Albín (to (Uruguay) Rampla Juniors)
13	DF	BRA	Jaílson (to Nea Salamis Famagusta)
14	FW	CUW	Jarchinio Antonia (to AEL Limassol)
18	DF	ESP	Isma López (to (Spain) Tenerife)
19	FW	ENG	Jordan Greenidge (to (Spain) Badajoz)

=== Pafos ===
In:

No.	Pos.	Nation	Player
--	FW	LAT	Artūrs Karašausks (from (Latvia) FK RFS)
16	FW	NOR	Abdisalam Ibrahim (free agent)
92	FW	LAT	Deniss Rakels (loan return from (Latvia) Riga)

Out:

No.	Pos.	Nation	Player
--	FW	LAT	Artūrs Karašausks (on loan to (Latvia) Riga)
32	DF	CZE	Radek Dejmek (to (Poland) GKS Katowice)
74	FW	FRA	Kévin Bérigaud (on loan to (Latvia) Riga)

== Cypriot Second Division ==
=== AEZ Zakakiou ===
In:

No.	Pos.	Nation	Player
--	GK	CYP	Christian Demetriou (from Amathus Ayiou Tychona)
20	FW	SLE	Mustapha Bangura (from (Greece) AO Episkopi)
28	MF	COL	Diego Cuadros (from (Slovakia) FK Senica)

Out:

No.	Pos.	Nation	Player
10	MF	ARG	Nicolás Villafañe (to (Greece) O.F. Ierapetra)
14	MF	NED	Manuel Reangelo (to (Belgium) KFC Duffel)
22	DF	CYP	Constantinos Zarnas (to ENY Digenis Ipsona)
90	GK	CYP	Ellinas Sofroniou (released)

=== Akritas Chlorakas ===
In:

No.	Pos.	Nation	Player
17	FW	COM	Carino Atchaliso (from (France) La Suze FC)
99	FW	MAR	Mehdi Jaki (from (Morocco) MC Oujda)

Out:

No.	Pos.	Nation	Player
9	FW	CYP	Stathis Efstathiou (to Peyia 2014)
31	FW	NGR	Emmanuel Okoye (to (Saudi Arabia) Al-Arabi)
50	FW	BRA	Gabriel do Carmo (released)

=== Anagennisi Deryneia ===
In:

No.	Pos.	Nation	Player
77	MF	CYP	Michalis Giorkatzis (from Olympiakos Nicosia)
95	MF	BRA	Felipe Sousa (from (Portugal) C.D. Fátima)

Out:

No.	Pos.	Nation	Player
9	MF	MKD	Hakan Redzep (released)

=== Aris Limassol ===
In:

No.	Pos.	Nation	Player
26	MF	GRE	Rafail Gioukaris (from (Greece) Trikala)
99	FW	POR	Romeu Torres (from (Luxembourg) Pr. Niederkorn)

Out:

No.	Pos.	Nation	Player
2	DF	GRE	Thanasis Moulopoulos (released)
8	MF	BRA	Eduardo Brito (to (Greece) Apollon Pontus)
9	FW	GRE	Antonis Kyriazis (on loan to ENY-Digenis Ipsona)

=== ASIL ===
In:

No.	Pos.	Nation	Player
2	DF	CYP	Stelios Parpas (from Othellos Athienou)
16	FW	NED	Nassir Maachi (from (Netherlands) DOVO)

Out:

No.	Pos.	Nation	Player
5	MF	SEN	Issaga Diallo (released)
77	MF	GRE	Lyberis Stergidis (to (Greece) Nafpaktiakos)

=== Ayia Napa ===
In:

No.	Pos.	Nation	Player
30	DF	CYP	Eleftherios Mertakas (from Enosis Neon Paralimni)
37	FW	ENG	Omar Rowe (from Enosis Neon Paralimni)

Out:

No.	Pos.	Nation	Player
4	DF	CYP	Demetris Economou (to Achyronas Liopetriou)

=== Digenis Oroklinis ===
In:

No.	Pos.	Nation	Player
24	DF	CYP	Fotis Kezos (from (Greece) Trikala)
36	DF	CYP	Adamos Andreou (free agent)

Out:

No.	Pos.	Nation	Player
7	FW	BUL	Yordan Dimitrov (to Ethnikos Latsion)
21	MF	CYP	Andreas Nicolaou (to Omonia Psevda)

=== Ethnikos Achna ===
In:

No.	Pos.	Nation	Player
3	DF	CYP	Ioannis Efstathiou (from Doxa Katokopias)
18	MF	UKR	Ihor Khudobyak (from (Kazakhstan) Akzhayik)

Out:

No.	Pos.	Nation	Player
11	FW	BRA	Sidnei (to Omonia Aradippou)

=== Karmiotissa ===
In:

No.	Pos.	Nation	Player
12	MF	AFG	Sharif Mukhammad (free agent)
92	DF	GRE	Nikolaos Lougos (free agent)

Out:

No.	Pos.	Nation	Player
2	MF	SLO	David Lukanc (to (Slovenia) NK Radomlje)
6	MF	BRA	Zé Vitor (released)

=== MEAP Nisou ===
In:

No.	Pos.	Nation	Player
13	GK	CRO	Hrvoje Bukovski (free agent)

Out:

No.	Pos.	Nation	Player

=== Olympiakos Nicosia ===
In:

No.	Pos.	Nation	Player
8	MF	CYP	Alex Konstantinou (from APOEL)
66	MF	CYP	Andreas Pachipis (from Doxa Katokopias)

Out:

No.	Pos.	Nation	Player
--	MF	POR	Vítor Pisco (on loan to (Portugal) Cinfães, previously on loan at (Portugal) Gafanha)
30	MF	CYP	Michalis Giorkatzis (to Anagennisi Deryneia)
98	FW	CRO	Mario Crnički (to (Bosnia and Herzegovina) FK Sarajevo)

=== Omonia Aradippou ===
In:

No.	Pos.	Nation	Player
30	FW	BRA	Sidnei (from Ethnikos Achna)

Out:

No.	Pos.	Nation	Player
20	MF	NED	Everton Pires Tavares (to (Netherlands) SV Spakenburg)

=== Onisilos Sotira 2014 ===
In:

No.	Pos.	Nation	Player
16	MF	CYP	Zacharias Theodorou (from Nea Salamis Famagusta)
97	MF	AUS	Bai Antoniou (on loan from Alki Oroklini)

Out:

No.	Pos.	Nation	Player

=== Othellos Athienou ===
In:

No.	Pos.	Nation	Player
13	DF	CYP	Alexis Theocharous (on loan from Alki Oroklini)
30	GK	ESP	Pulpo Romero (free agent)

Out:

No.	Pos.	Nation	Player
23	GK	CYP	Zannetos Mytidis (to Chalkanoras Idaliou)
24	DF	CYP	Stelios Parpas (to ASIL)
94	MF	FRA	Yoann Tribeau (to Alki Oroklini)

=== PAEEK ===
In:

No.	Pos.	Nation	Player
55	FW	POR	Maycon Canário (from (Portugal) Varzim)
94	FW	BRA	Lucas (free agent)

Out:

No.	Pos.	Nation	Player
7	FW	GRE	Giorgos Lyras (to (Greece) Aittitos Spata)
8	MF	CMR	Roger Looga (released)
9	FW	SEN	Pape Ibrahima Diakhité (released)
11	DF	CYP	Stylianos Kallenos (to Ormideia FC)
27	DF	CYP	Sergios Hadjidemetriou (to P.O. Xylotymbou)

=== THOI Lakatamia ===
In:

No.	Pos.	Nation	Player
28	MF	BUL	Antonio Hadzhiivanov (free agent)
48	FW	GRE	Georgios Tsirlidis (from (Greece) Acharnaikos)

Out:

No.	Pos.	Nation	Player
10	MF	POR	Martim Galvão (to (Greece) AE Sparti)
