= Konstantinos Konstantinou =

Konstantinos Konstantinou may refer to:

- Konstantinos Konstantinou (cyclist)
- Konstantinos Konstantinou (judoka)
- Konstantinos Konstantinou (footballer, born 1999), Cypriot football forward for EN Paralimniou
