= Stefanos Mouktaris =

Cypriot footballer (born 1994)

Personal information
- Full name: Stefanos Mouktaris
- Date of birth: July 10, 1994 (age 32)
- Place of birth: Nicosia, Cyprus
- Height: 1.84 m (6 ft 1/2 in)
- Position: Defender

Team information
- Current team: Doxa Katokopias
- Number: 5

Senior career*
Years	Team	Apps	(Gls)
2013–2015	Olympiakos Nicosia	42	(5)
2015–2016	Kallithea	30	(3)
2017	Panionios	2	(0)
2017–2019	Doxa Katokopias	44	(4)
2019–2020	APOEL	0	(0)
2019–2020	→ Doxa Katokopias (loan)	12	(0)
2020	Olympiakos Nicosia	1	(0)
2020–2021	Doxa Katokopias	33	(2)
2021–2023	Olympiakos Nicosia	39	(1)
2023–2024	Karmiotissa	0	(0)
2024–	Doxa Katokopias	22	(1)

International career
2015	Cyprus U21	3	(0)
- * Club domestic league appearances and goals as of 3 May 2026

Stefanos Mouktaris (Greek: Στέφανος Μουκτάρης; born 10 July 1994) is a Cypriot footballer who plays for Doxa.
