= Patryk Procek =

Polish footballer

Personal information
- Full name: Patryk Tomasz Procek
- Date of birth: 1 March 1995 (age 31)
- Place of birth: Rybnik, Poland
- Height: 1.92 m (6 ft 3 1/2 in)
- Position: Goalkeeper

Team information
- Current team: Elana Toruń
- Number: 95

Youth career
- –2011: ROW Rybnik
- 2011–2012: Górnik Zabrze

Senior career*
Years	Team	Apps	(Gls)
2012–2015	Górnik Zabrze II	2	(0)
2014–2015	→ Nadwiślan Góra (loan)	0	(0)
2015	→ Skra Częstochowa (loan)	17	(0)
2015–2016	ROW Rybnik	10	(0)
2016–2018	Ethnikos Achna	19	(0)
2018	GKS Katowice	0	(0)
2018–2022	AEL Limassol	19	(0)
2021–2022	→ PAEEK (loan)	22	(0)
2023–2024	Podbeskidzie	22	(0)
2024–2025	Krasava Ypsonas	26	(0)
2025–	Elana Toruń	26	(0)
- * Club domestic league appearances and goals as of 16:11, 4 June 2026 (UTC)

Patryk Tomasz Procek (born 1 March 1995) is a Polish professional footballer as a goalkeeper for III liga club Elana Toruń.

== Honours ==
Górnik Zabrze II

- Regional league Katowice IV: 2012–13

AEL Limassol

- Cypriot Cup: 2018–19

Krasava Ypsonas

- Cypriot Second Division: 2024–25
