= Volodymyr Dmytrenko =

Ukrainian footballer

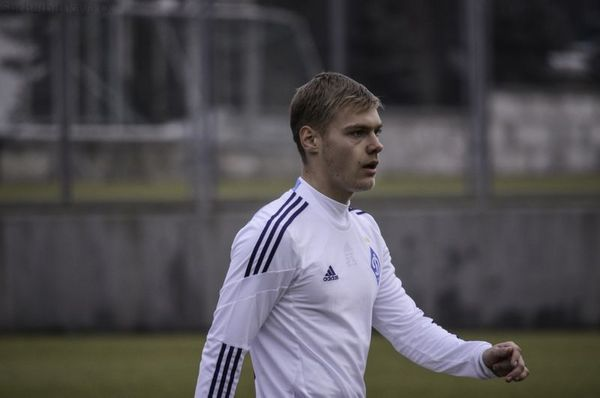

Personal information
- Full name: Volodymyr Pavlovych Dmytrenko
- Date of birth: 23 July 1995 (age 31)
- Place of birth: Kyiv, Ukraine
- Height: 1.83 m (6 ft 0 in)
- Position: Right-back

Team information
- Current team: Obolon Kyiv
- Number: 25

Youth career
- 2002–2009: Skhid Kyiv
- 2009–2012: Metalist Kharkiv

Senior career*
Years	Team	Apps	(Gls)
2012–2013	Metalist Kharkiv	0	(0)
2013	Bukovyna Chernivtsi	0	(0)
2013–2014	Tavriya Simferopol	0	(0)
2015–2016	Dynamo Kyiv	0	(0)
2015–2016	→ Dynamo-2 Kyiv	14	(0)
2017	Veres Rivne	1	(0)
2017	Arsenal Kyiv	3	(0)
2018	Nyva-V Vinnytsia	7	(0)
2018–2019	Alki Oroklini	0	(0)
2018–2019	→ Onisilos Sotira (loan)	21	(0)
2019–2021	Dinaz Vyshhorod	34	(3)
2021–2022	Olimpik Donetsk	17	(0)
2022–	Obolon Kyiv	0	(0)
- * Club domestic league appearances and goals as of 11 February 2022

Volodymyr Pavlovych Dmytrenko (Ukrainian: Володимир Павлович Дмитренко; born 23 July 1995) is a Ukrainian professional footballer who plays as a right-back for Obolon Kyiv.

== Career ==
Dmytrenko is a product of the FC Skhid Kyiv and FC Metalist Kharkiv Youth Sportive Schools. His first trainer was Oleksandr Hrebenozhko (in Skhid Kyiv).

He spent his career as a player for FC Metalist, SC Tavriya, FC Dynamo Kyiv in the Ukrainian Premier League Reserves and after for FC Dynamo-2, FC Veres and FC Arsenal Kyiv in the Ukrainian First League.
