= Yiannis Mavrou =

Cypriot footballer (born 1994)

Personal information
- Full name: Yiannis Mavrou
- Date of birth: 19 July 1994 (age 32)
- Place of birth: Nicosia, Cyprus
- Height: 1.75 m (5 ft 9 in)
- Position: Striker

Team information
- Current team: MEAP Nisou
- Number: 19

Senior career*
Years	Team	Apps	(Gls)
2010–2015	Olympiakos Nicosia	61	(11)
2015–2019	AEL Limassol	30	(4)
2018–2019	→ Ermis Aradippou (loan)	23	(4)
2021	Karaiskakis	15	(1)
2021	Ermis Aradippou	0	(0)
2021–2023	Othellos Athienou	49	(6)
2023–2024	ENAD	24	(1)
2024–2025	Achyronas-Onisilos	13	(0)
2025–	MEAP Nisou	25	(0)

International career
2014	Cyprus U-21	3	(0)
- * Club domestic league appearances and goals as of 3 May 2026

Yiannis Mavrou (Greek: Γιάννης Μαύρου, born 19 July 1994) is a Cypriot footballer who plays as a striker for MEAP Nisou.

== Career ==
A product of the Olympiakos Nicosia academy he regularly played as a striker for the Nicosia club for two seasons, as well as for the Cyprus U21 before earning a transfer to AEL Limassol.
