= Michalis Music =

Cypriot footballer

Personal information
- Date of birth: February 4, 1999 (age 27)
- Place of birth: Larnaca, Cyprus
- Height: 1.84 m (6 ft 0 in)
- Position: Midfielder

Team information
- Current team: ASIL
- Number: 8

Youth career
- AEK Larnaca

Senior career*
Years	Team	Apps	(Gls)
2015–2019	AEK Larnaca	3	(0)
2017–2018	→ Ethnikos Achna (loan)	7	(0)
2018–2019	→ Ayia Napa (loan)	6	(0)
2019–2020	PO Xylotymbou	16	(0)
2020–	ASIL	0	(0)
- * Club domestic league appearances and goals as of 02:04, 8 July 2018 (UTC)

Michalis Music (Greek: Μιχάλης Μούσιτς; born February 4, 1999) is a Cypriot footballer who plays as a midfielder for ASIL.
