= Apollonas Vasiliou =

Cypriot footballer (born 1997)

Personal information
- Full name: Apollonas Vasiliou
- Date of birth: 29 March 1997 (age 29)
- Place of birth: Nicosia, Cyprus
- Height: 1.85 m (6 ft 1 in)
- Position: Striker

Team information
- Current team: Omonia Aradippou

Youth career
- Omonia

Senior career*
Years	Team	Apps	(Gls)
2015–2019	Omonia	1	(0)
2015–2016	→ MEAP Nisou (loan)	27	(16)
2017–2018	→ Chalkanoras Idaliou (loan)	8	(2)
2018–2019	→ Alki Oroklini (loan)	5	(0)
2019–	Omonia Aradippou	0	(0)

International career^{‡}
2015–	Cyprus U19	5	(0)
- * Club domestic league appearances and goals as of 19 May 2019 ‡ National team caps and goals as of 2 May 2017

Apollonas Vasiliou (Greek: Απόλλωνας Βασιλείου; born 29 March 1997) is a professional football player who plays as a striker for Omonia Aradippou.

== Career ==
He started his career with AC Omonia, making his first appearance for the senior squad during the 2016–17 season against AEL Limassol.

== Club statistics ==
As of match played 25 November 2017

Club	Season	League		Cup		Europe		Total	
Club	Season	Apps	Goals	Apps	Goals	Apps	Goals	Apps	Goals
MEAP
MEAP	2015–16	27	16	0	0	–		27	16
Omonia
Omonia	2016–17	1	0	0	0	0	0	1	0
Chalkanoras
Chalkanoras	2017–18	8	2	0	0	–		8	2
Career total		36	18	0	0	0	0	36	18
