= Andreas Komodikis =

English footballer (born 1997)

Personal information
- Date of birth: 2 June 1997 (age 29)
- Place of birth: London, England
- Positions: Midfielder; winger

Team information
- Current team: APEA Akrotiri
- Number: 10

Youth career
- Tottenham
- 2013–2016: QPR

Senior career*
Years	Team	Apps	(Gls)
2016	St Albans City	0	(0)
2017–2022	Doxa	8	(0)
2017–2018	→ PAEEK (loan)		
2018–2020	→ ASIl (loan)		
2021	→ Karmiotissa (loan)	10	(0)
2021–2022	→ PAEEK (loan)	20	(1)
2022–2023	AEZ Zakakiou	25	(8)
2023–2024	ASIL Lysi	24	(4)
2024–2025	Krasava ENY Ypsonas	8	(0)
2025–	APEA Akrotiri	21	(2)
- * Club domestic league appearances and goals as of 3 May 2026

Andreas Komodikis (Greek: Ανδρέας Κωμοδίκης; born 2 June 1997) is a footballer who plays as a midfielder or winger for APEA Akrotiri. Born in England, he is a youth international for Cyprus.

== Career ==
At the age of 8, Komodikis joined the youth academy of English Premier League side Tottenham. In 2013, he joined the youth academy of QPR in the English second tier. In 2016, he signed for English sixth tier club St Albans City. In 2017, Komodikis signed for Doxa in the Cypriot top flight.

After that, he was sent on loan to Cypriot second-tier team PAEEK. Before the second half of 2020–21, Komidikis was sent on loan to Karmiotissa in the Cypriot top flight, where he made 11 appearances and scored 0 goals. On 10 January 2021, he debuted for Karmiotissa during a 1–1 draw with Doxa.
