= Rafail Gioukaris =

Greek footballer

Personal information
- Full name: Rafail Georgios Gioukaris
- Date of birth: 27 February 1995 (age 31)
- Place of birth: Mytilene, Greece
- Height: 1.66 m (5 ft 5 in)
- Position: Midfielder

Team information
- Current team: Ayia Napa
- Number: 26

Youth career
- AEL Kalloni

Senior career*
Years	Team	Apps	(Gls)
2013–2017	AEL Kalloni	38	(1)
2017–2018	Ayia Napa		
2018–2019	Trikala	10	(0)
2019	Aris Limassol	10	(0)
2019–	Ayia Napa	1	(0)

International career^{‡}
2013–2014	Greece U19	2	(0)
- * Club domestic league appearances and goals as of 21 May 2020 ‡ National team caps and goals as of 7 May 2014

Rafail Gioukaris (Greek: Ραφαήλ Γιουκαρής; born 27 February 1995) is a Greek professional footballer who plays as a midfielder for Cypriot Second Division club Ayia Napa.
