= Alastair Reynolds (footballer) =

Scottish footballer

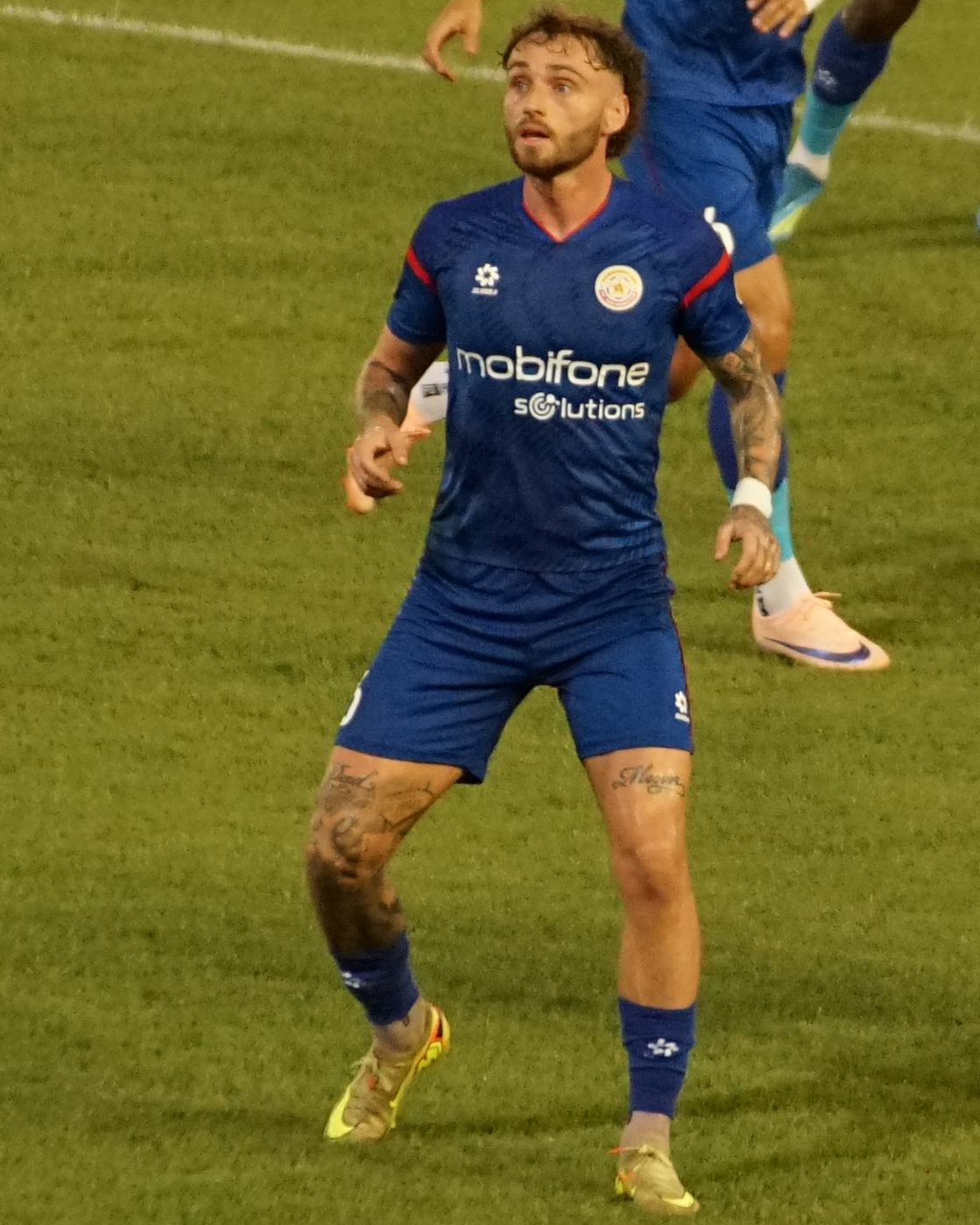
- Reynolds in 2026

Personal information
- Full name: Alastair David Reynolds
- Date of birth: 2 September 1996 (age 30)
- Place of birth: Edinburgh, Scotland
- Height: 1.85 m (6 ft 1 in)
- Position: Midfielder

Team information
- Current team: PVF-CAND
- Number: 6

Youth career
- Hibernian
- 2006–2015: Apollon Limassol

Senior career*
Years	Team	Apps	(Gls)
2013–2018	Apollon Limassol	12	(0)
2015–2016	→ Ayia Napa (loan)	14	(0)
2017–2018	→ Nea Salamina (loan)	27	(0)
2019–2020	Nea Salamina	22	(0)
2020–2021	Karmiotissa	32	(0)
2021–2022	AEL Limassol	15	(0)
2022–2023	Achyronas-Onisilos	26	(0)
2023–2024	AEZ Zakakiou	29	(1)
2024–2026	Akritas Chlorakas	33	(3)
2026–	PVF-CAND	12	(1)
- * Club domestic league appearances and goals as of 12 June 2026

Alastair David Reynolds (born 2 September 1996) is a Scottish professional footballer who plays as a midfielder for V.League 1 club PVF-CAND.

== Club career ==
Reynolds began his youth career with Hibernian, before moving to Cyprus when he was nine years old, after his father was posted to the British military base at Episkopi. He joined Cypriot side Apollon Limassol and progressed through their youth ranks. He made his debut on the last day of the 2012–13 season, playing 80 minutes in a 3–1 home defeat by local rivals AEL Limassol.

== Personal life ==
Rangers fan Reynolds, named after his dad's hero Ally McCoist, was born in Edinburgh.

== Career statistics ==
As of 12 June 2026

Club	Season	League			Cup		Continental		Other		Total	
Club	Season	Division	Apps	Goals	Apps	Goals	Apps	Goals	Apps	Goals	Apps	Goals
Apollon Limassol	2012–13	Cypriot First Division	1	0	0	0	—		—		1	0
Apollon Limassol	2013–14	Cypriot First Division	0	0	0	0	—		—		0	0
Apollon Limassol	2014–15	Cypriot First Division	1	0	0	0	—		—		1	0
Apollon Limassol	2015–16	Cypriot First Division	0	0	0	0	1 (Note: Appearances in the UEFA Europa League)	0	0	0	1	0
Apollon Limassol	2016–17	Cypriot First Division	10	0	0	0	0	0	0	0	10	0
Apollon Limassol	2017–18	Cypriot First Division	0	0	0	0	0	0	0	0	0	0
Apollon Limassol	Total		12	0	0	0	1	0	0	0	13	0
Ayia Napa (loan)	2015–16	Cypriot First Division	14	0	1	0	—		—		15	0
Nea Salamina (loan)	2017–18	Cypriot First Division	27	0	2	0	—		—		29	0
Nea Salamina	2018–19	Cypriot First Division	10	0	2	0	—		—		12	0
Nea Salamina	2019–20	Cypriot First Division	12	0	1	0	—		—		13	0
Nea Salamina	Total		22	0	3	0	—		—		25	0
Karmiotissa	2020–21	Cypriot First Division	32	0	1	0	—		—		33	0
AEL Limassol	2021–22	Cypriot First Division	15	0	2	0	0	0	—		17	0
Achyronas-Onisilos	2022–23	Cypriot Second Division	26	0	1	0	—		—		27	0
AEZ Zakakiou	2023–24	Cypriot First Division	29	1	1	0	—		—		30	1
Akritas Chlorakas	2024–25	Cypriot Second Division	5	0	0	0	—		—		5	0
Akritas Chlorakas	Total		107	1	5	0	—		—		115	0
PVF-CAND	2025–26	V.League 1	12	1	0	0	—		0	0	12	1
Career total			194	2	11	0	1	0	1	0	207	2
