= Johny El Zein =

Cypriot–Belizean footballer (born 1992)

Zein
Personal information
- Full name: Johny El Zein
- Date of birth: 24 March 1992 (age 34)
- Place of birth: Dubai, United Arab Emirates
- Height: 1.76 m (5 ft 9 in)
- Position: Attacking midfielder

Team information
- Current team: Aris Limassol
- Number: 17

Senior career*
| Years | Team | Apps | (Gls) |
| 2017–2018 | Ethnikos Achna | 3 | (0) |
| 2018–2019 | Enosis Neon Paralimni | | |
| 2019– | Aris Limassol | 4 | (1) |
- * Club domestic league appearances and goals

Johny El Zein (born 24 March 1992), simply known as Zein, is a professional footballer who currently plays as a winger for Aris Limassol FC. Born in the United Arab Emirates, El Zein represents Belize internationally.

== Club career ==
Zein was born in Dubai, UAE played previously for Ethnikos Achna FC. Officials announced on 2 February 2018, Zein was eligible to play against Apoel FC just days after the signing. Zein made his professional debut with Ethnikos Achna FC against Doxa Katokopias FC coming on as a substitute.

== Aris FC ==
In August 2019 announcement was made that the versatile winger signed for the season 2019/2020 with Aris FC. He made his league Debut coming off the bench on the 54th minute and scoring one goal with a good clinical finish. On Aris FC victory against Omonia Aradippou, Zein helped coming off the bench to keep the lead. The Limassol team are now 1st place of the first group.

== International career ==
El Zein was born in the United Arab Emirates to a Belizean Arab father and Cypriot mother. He was called up to represent the Belize national team in March 2021.

== Personal life ==
Zein has made contributions alongside his teammates at Enosis Neon Paralimni to a charitable event, which aims to raise money for children with special needs.
