= Giorgos Papadopoulos (footballer, born 1991) =

Cypriot footballer (born 1991)

Personal information
- Full name: Giorgos Papadopoulos
- Date of birth: 24 April 1991 (age 35)
- Place of birth: Nicosia, Cyprus
- Height: 1.87 m (6 ft 2 in)
- Position: Goalkeeper

Team information
- Current team: Doxa
- Number: 91

Youth career
- –2009: Thoi Lakatamia

Senior career*
Years	Team	Apps	(Gls)
2009–2013	Ermis Aradippou	12	(0)
2013–2014	Anagennisi Dherynia	21	(0)
2014–2015	APEP	26	(0)
2015–2016	PAEEK FC	24	(0)
2016–2018	Anorthosis	4	(0)
2018–2019	Ermis Aradippou	5	(0)
2019–2023	Anorthosis Famagusta	4	(0)
2023–2024	PAEEK	27	(0)
2024–	Doxa	4	(0)

International career^{‡}
2010	Cyprus U19	1	(0)
2013	Cyprus U21	2	(0)
- * Club domestic league appearances and goals as of 26 June 2025 ‡ National team caps and goals as of 19 June 2023

Giorgos Papadopoulos (Greek: Γιώργος Παπαδόπουλος; born 24 April 1991) is a Cypriot professional footballer who plays as a goalkeeper for Doxa.
