= Chrysovalantis Kapartis =

Cypriot footballer (born 1991)

Personal information
- Full name: Chrysovalantis Kapartis
- Date of birth: October 26, 1991 (age 35)
- Place of birth: Nicosia, Cyprus
- Height: 1.80 m (5 ft 11 in)
- Position: Winger

Team information
- Current team: Digenis Akritas
- Number: 19

Senior career*
Years	Team	Apps	(Gls)
2008–2013	Olympiakos Nicosia	16	(0)
2011–2013	→ Chalkanoras Idaliou (loan)	28	(6)
2013–2015	Enosis Neon THOI Lakatamia	40	(11)
2016	PAEEK	14	(6)
2017–2018	Olympiakos Nicosia	30	(5)
2018–2020	Ethnikos Achna	27	(9)
2019–2020	→ ASIL Lysi (loan)	17	(7)
2020–2021	Karmiotissa	18	(1)
2021–2022	PAEEK	28	(14)
2022-2023	Olympiakos Nicosia	3	(0)
2023-2024	ASIL Lysi	26	(12)
2024	Doxa Katokopias	8	(0)
2025-	Digenis Akritas	30	(9)
- * Club domestic league appearances and goals as of 3 May 2026

Chrysovalantis Kapartis (Greek: Χρυσοβαλάντης Καπαρτής, born 26 October 1991) is a Cypriot footballer who plays for Digenis Akritas as a winger.
