= Andreas Neofytou =

Cypriot footballer (born 1998)

Personal information
- Full name: Andreas Neofytou
- Date of birth: 7 July 1998 (age 28)
- Place of birth: Limassol, Cyprus
- Height: 1.85 m (6 ft 1 in)
- Positions: Defensive midfielder; centre-back

Team information
- Current team: Karmiotissa
- Number: 8

Youth career
- –2015: AEL Limassol

Senior career*
Years	Team	Apps	(Gls)
2015–2017	AEL Limassol	5	(0)
2017–2018	→ Karmiotissa (loan)	7	(0)
2018–2020	Karmiotissa	13	(1)
2020–2022	Anorthosis Famagusta	0	(0)
2020–2021	→ Karmiotissa (loan)	25	(0)
2021–2022	→ PAEEK (loan)	21	(0)
2022–	Karmiotissa	109	(0)

International career^{‡}
2014	Cyprus U17	3	(1)
2016–	Cyprus U19	9	(0)
- * Club domestic league appearances and goals as of 3 May 2026 ‡ National team caps and goals as of 11 June 2020

Andreas Neofytou (Greek: Ανδρέας Νεοφύτου; born 7 July 1998) is a Cypriot professional footballer who plays for Cypriot First Division club Karmiotissa. He plays as a defensive midfielder.

== Club career ==
On 23 June 2020, the 21-year-old Neofytou signed a four-year contract with Cypriot club Anorthosis Famagusta and will remain in Karmiotissa until the end of the 2020–21 season.
