= Jean Charles Fernandez =

Guinean soccer player

Personal information
- Date of birth: 20 January 1998 (age 28)
- Height: 1.77 m (5 ft 10 in)
- Positions: Defender; midfielder

Team information
- Current team: ASIL Lysi
- Number: 19

Senior career*
Years	Team	Apps	(Gls)
2016–2018	ASFAG		
2018–2019	Doxa Katokopias	3	(0)
2019–	ASIL Lysi	5	(0)

International career^{‡}
2017	Guinea U20	1	(0)
2018–	Guinea	1	(0)
- * Club domestic league appearances and goals as of 19:10, 21 May 2020 (UTC) ‡ National team caps and goals as of 20:36, 11 January 2019 (UTC)

Jean Charles Fernandez (born 20 January 1998), is a Guinean footballer who currently plays as a defender or midfielder for ASIL Lysi.

== Career statistics ==
=== Club ===
As of 21 January 2019.

Club	Season	League			Cup		Continental		Other		Total	
Club	Season	Division	Apps	Goals	Apps	Goals	Apps	Goals	Apps	Goals	Apps	Goals
Doxa Katokopias	2018–19	Cypriot First Division	3	0	0	0	–		0	0	3	0
Career total			3	0	0	0	0	0	0	0	3	0

=== International ===
As of matches played 21 January 2019.

National team	Year	Apps	Goals
Guinea	2018	1	0
Total		1	0
