= Andreas Pachipis =

Cypriot footballer (born 1994)

Personal information
- Full name: Andreas Pachipis
- Date of birth: 16 December 1994 (age 31)
- Place of birth: Cyprus
- Positions: Defender; midfielder

Youth career
- Blackpool

Senior career*
Years	Team	Apps	(Gls)
2014	Vestri	11	(0)
2014-2015	Hyde	3	(0)
2015-2018	Aris Limassol	52	(0)
2018-2019	Doxa	5	(0)
2019-2020	Olympiakos	3	(0)
2020-	Karmiotissa	22	(0)
- * Club domestic league appearances and goals

Andreas Pachipis (Greek: Ανδρέας Παχίπης; born 16 December 1994) is a Cypriot footballer who plays as a defender or midfielder for Karmiotissa.

== Career ==
As a youth player, Pachipis joined the youth academy of English second division side Blackpool.

In 2014, he signed for Vestri in the Icelandic second division, before joining English sixth division club Hyde United.

In 2015, Pachipis signed for Aris Limassol in the Cypriot top flight, where he made 52 league appearances and scored 0 goals.

In 2018, he signed for Cypriot team Doxa.

In 2019, Pachipis signed for Olympiakos in Cyprus.

In 2020, Pachipis left Olympiakos and returned to Aris Limassol.
