= Christos Marathonitis =

Greek footballer

Personal information
- Date of birth: 16 November 1998 (age 27)
- Place of birth: Athens, Greece
- Height: 1.85 m (6 ft 1 in)
- Position: Winger

Team information
- Current team: Egaleo
- Number: 17

Youth career
- 2012–2014: Panionios
- 2014–2015: NAC Breda
- 2015–2016: Excelsior
- 2016–2017: Dordrecht

Senior career*
Years	Team	Apps	(Gls)
2017–2018	Kallithea	0	(0)
2018–2019	Ethnikos Achna	16	(3)
2019–2020	Onisilos Sotira	9	(1)
2020–2021	Karaiskakis	15	(3)
2021–2022	Panathinaikos B	25	(1)
2022–2023	Panachaiki	1	(0)
2023	OF Ierapetra	7	(0)
2023–2024	Egaleo		
- * Club domestic league appearances and goals as of 16 June 2023

Christos Marathonitis (Greek: Χρήστος Μαραθωνίτης; born 16 November 1998) is a Greek professional footballer who plays as a winger for Super League 2 club Egaleo.

== Honours ==
Ethnikos Achna

- Cypriot Second Division: 2018–19
