= Konstantinos Konstantinou (footballer, born 1999) =

Cypriot footballer (born 1999)

Personal information
- Date of birth: 8 October 1999 (age 27)
- Position: Forward

Team information
- Current team: PAEEK
- Number: 70

Youth career
- 2014–2017: AEK Larnaca

Senior career*
Years	Team	Apps	(Gls)
2016–2022	AEK Larnaca	13	(0)
2017–2018	→ Ethnikos Achna (loan)	3	(0)
2021–2022	→ EN Paralimniou (loan)	0	(0)
2022–2023	EN Paralimniou	29	(1)
2023	Doxa Katokopias	2	(0)
2023–2024	EN Paralimniou	19	(0)
2024–	PAEEK	19	(3)

International career^{‡}
2015	Cyprus U17	3	(0)
2016–2017	Cyprus U19	4	(0)
- * Club domestic league appearances and goals as of 20 June 2025 ‡ National team caps and goals as of 7 October 2018

Konstantinos Konstantinou (Greek: Κωνσταντίνος Κωνσταντίνου; born 8 October 1999) is a Cypriot football player who plays as a forward for PAEEK.

== Club career ==
He made his Cypriot First Division debut for AEK Larnaca on 14 May 2016 in a game against Nea Salamis Famagusta as a 67th-minute substitute for Konstantinos Anthimou.
