= Samuel Oppong (Austrian footballer) =

Footballer (born 1998)

Personal information
- Date of birth: 12 May 1998 (age 28)
- Place of birth: Kumasi, Ghana
- Height: 1.66 m (5 ft 5 in)
- Position: Winger

Team information
- Current team: Wiener Sport-Club
- Number: 9

Youth career
- 2008–2009: Red Star Penzing
- 2009–2015: Rapid Wien

Senior career*
Years	Team	Apps	(Gls)
2015–2018	Rapid Wien II	1	(0)
2016–2017	→ Admira Wacker II (loan)	19	(2)
2017–2018	→ Blau-Weiß Linz (loan)	22	(1)
2018–2019	Olympiakos Nicosia		
2019–2020	Kapfenberger SV	5	(1)
2020	Rapid Wien II	2	(0)
2020–2022	FC Marchfeld	8	(5)
2022–2023	FCM Traiskirchen	31	(3)
2023	FC Mauerwerk	14	(2)
2024–2025	Wiener Sport-Club	29	(2)
2026–	Wiener Sport-Club	8	(1)

International career
2014	Austria U16	4	(1)
2014–2015	Austria U17	9	(0)
2016	Austria U18	2	(0)
- * Club domestic league appearances and goals as of 28 June 2026

Samuel Oppong (born 12 May 1998) is a footballer who plays as a forward for Wiener Sport-Club. Born in Ghana, he has represented Austria internationally at youth levels U16 through U18.

== Club career ==
Oppong made his Austrian Football First League debut for FC Blau-Weiß Linz on 11 August 2017 in a game against SV Ried.

In the summer 2020, Oppong moved to Austrian Regionalliga club FC Marchfeld Donauauen.
