= Romeu Torres =

Portuguese footballer

Personal information
- Full name: Romeu Freitas Torres
- Date of birth: 7 August 1986 (age 40)
- Place of birth: Santo Tirso, Portugal
- Height: 1.80 m (5 ft 11 in)
- Position: Forward

Youth career
- 1995–2005: Paços Ferreira

Senior career*
Years	Team	Apps	(Gls)
2005–2007	Fiães	36	(7)
2007–2008	Portosantense	28	(14)
2008–2010	Paços Ferreira	11	(2)
2008–2009	→ Aves (loan)	21	(3)
2011–2012	Arouca	30	(2)
2012	Penafiel	12	(1)
2013	Trofense	10	(0)
2013–2014	Al-Ahli		
2014–2015	Al-Nahda		
2015–2016	Al Hala		
2016–2018	Olympiakos Nicosia	57	(27)
2018	Progrès Niederkorn	9	(3)
2019	Aris Limassol	16	(12)
2019–2020	Alki Oroklini	17	(6)
- * Club domestic league appearances and goals as of 31 May 2019

Romeu Freitas Torres (born 7 August 1986 in Santo Tirso, Porto District) is a Portuguese professional footballer who plays as a forward.
