= Georgios Lyras =

Greek footballer (born 1994)

Personal information
- Full name: Georgios Lyras
- Date of birth: 23 June 1994 (age 32)
- Place of birth: Leptokarya, Pieria, Greece
- Height: 1.71 m (5 ft 7 1/2 in)
- Position: Left winger

Youth career
- 2011–2012: Olympiacos

Senior career*
Years	Team	Apps	(Gls)
2012–2013	Olympiacos	0	(0)
2013–2014	→ Vataniakos (loan)	5	(0)
2014	→ Fostiras (loan)	24	(2)
2015	AEL	4	(0)
2015–2016	Ialysos		
2016–2017	Chania	5	(0)
2017	Acharnaikos	16	(1)
2017–2018	Eintracht Trier	15	(0)
2018	Makedonikos	0	(0)
2018–2019	PAEEK	9	(0)
2019	Aittitos Spata	8	(1)
2019–2020	Türkspor Augsburg	1	(0)
- * Club domestic league appearances and goals as of 30 March 2019

Georgios Lyras (Greek: Γεώργιος Λύρας; born 23 June 1994) is a Greek professional footballer who last played as a left winger for German club Türkspor Augsburg.

== Career ==
He began his career from the youth teams of Olympiacos, under coach Bernd Storck. In 2013, he was given on loan to Vataniakos and then in January 2014 to Fostiras, in which he had a full season helping his team to reach the promotion Play-offs to the Super League. On 13 January 2015 he signed a 1.5-year contract with AEL, making 4 league appearances. On 31 July 2015, the young player who had a contract for another year with the "crimsons", was told that is not calculated for the new season by his manager Ratko Dostanić and was asked to search for a new team to continue his career.
