= João Leonardo (footballer, born 1985) =

Brazilian footballer

Personal information
- Full name: João Leonardo de Paula Reginato
- Date of birth: 25 June 1985 (age 41)
- Place of birth: Campinas, Brazil
- Height: 1.85 m (6 ft 1 in)
- Position: Centre back

Team information
- Current team: Digenis Akritas

Youth career
- 2003–2004: Guarani

Senior career*
Years	Team	Apps	(Gls)
2004–2005	Guarani	19	(1)
2005–2008	Atlético Paranaense	34	(0)
2008	Juventude		
2008–2010	Tombense		
2008–2009	→ Grêmio Barueri (loan)	2	(0)
2009	→ Fortaleza (loan)	4	(0)
2010	→ Ituano (loan)	17	(1)
2010	→ Paraná (loan)	3	(0)
2011	São Bernardo	4	(0)
2011	Marília	1	(0)
2011–2012	Marcílio Dias	9	(0)
2012–2017	Doxa Katokopias	133	(5)
2017–2018	Aris Limassol	0	(0)
2018	Enosis Neon Paralimni	13	(0)
2018–2019	Olympiakos Nicosia	27	(1)
2019–	Digenis Akritas	0	(0)

International career
2005	Brazil U20	3	(0)
- * Club domestic league appearances and goals as of 31 May 2019

João Leonardo de Paula Reginato (born 25 June 1985), or simply João Leonardo, is a Brazilian football central defender, who plays for Digenis Akritas Morphou FC.

== Career ==
He made his professional debut with Atlético Paranaense in 3-2 home victory against Paysandu in Campeonato Brasileiro on November 27, 2005.

In June 2019 it was confirmed, that Leonardo had joined Cypriot club Digenis Akritas Morphou FC.

== Contract ==
- Tombense: December 14, 2008 to December 31, 2011
  - → Fortaleza (loan): September 1, 2009 to December 1, 2009
