= Andreas Fragkeskou =

Cypriot footballer

Andreas Frangeskou
Personal information
- Full name: Andreas Frangeskou
- Date of birth: 26 July 1996 (age 30)
- Place of birth: Nicosia, Cyprus
- Height: 1.85 m (6 ft 1 in)
- Position: Centre-back

Team information
- Current team: Omonia

Youth career
- Omonia

Senior career*
Years	Team	Apps	(Gls)
2013–	Omonia	1	(0)
2013–2014	→ Alki Larnaca (loan)	10	(0)
2015–2016	→ PAEEK (loan)	24	(0)
2018–2019	→ Nea Salamina (loan)	2	(0)

International career^{‡}
2015–	Cyprus U19	5	(0)
- * Club domestic league appearances and goals as of 25 May 2019 ‡ National team caps and goals as of 2 May 2017

Andreas Frangeskou (Greek: Αντρέας Φραγκέσκου; born 26 July 1996) is a Cypriot professional football player who plays as a centre back for Omonia.

== Career ==
He started his career with AC Omonia, making his first appearance for the senior squad during the 2016–17 season against AEL Limassol.
