= 2015–16 APOEL FC season =

APOEL
2015–16 season
- Chairman: Prodromos Petrides
- Manager: Domingos Paciência (Until 28 August 2015); Temur Ketsbaia (28 August 2015 – 20 April 2016); Georgios Kostis (Caretaker:From 20 April 2016)
- Stadium: GSP Stadium, Nicosia
- Cypriot First Division: 1st
- Cypriot Cup: Semi-finals
- Cypriot Super Cup: Runners-up
- UEFA Champions League: Play-off round
- UEFA Europa League: Group stage
- Top goalscorer: League: Fernando Cavenaghi (19); All: Fernando Cavenaghi (23)
- Highest home attendance: 17,699 vs Astana (26 August 2015 – UEFA Champions League)
- Lowest home attendance: 2,734 vs Nea Salamina (27 January 2016 – Cypriot Cup)
- Average home league attendance: 8,359 (all competitions)
Home colours	Away colours	Third colours

The 2015–16 season was APOEL's 76th season in the Cypriot First Division and 88th year in existence as a football club.

== Season review ==
=== Head coach changes ===
August 2015: On 28 August 2015, APOEL terminated Domingos Paciência's contract, following the team's failure to reach the UEFA Champions League group stage after being eliminated by FC Astana in the play-offs of the competition. At the same day, Paciência was replaced by Georgian coach Temur Ketsbaia, who signed a two-year contract with the club.

April 2016: On 21 April 2016, one day after APOEL's elimination in the Cypriot Cup semi-finals by Apollon Limassol, Temur Ketsbaia's contract with APOEL was mutually terminated, although at that moment the team were four points clear at the top of the league with only four matches remaining. The same day, APOEL's assistant coach Georgios Kostis, took over as caretaker manager for the team's remaining four crucial league games of the season.

=== Pre-season and friendlies ===
The first training session for the season took place on 18 June 2015 at APOEL's training centre. On 23 June 2015 the team flew to Gniewino in Poland to perform the main stage of their pre-season training and returned to Cyprus on 5 July 2015. During the pre-season training stage in Poland, APOEL played five friendly matches. They won 2–0 FK Atlantas, drew 0–0 with Lech Poznań and lost three times against Lechia Gdańsk (1–4), Arka Gdynia (1–2) and Lech Poznań (0–3). After their return to Cyprus, APOEL played one friendly match, beating Doxa Katokopias 4–0 at Makario Stadium on 8 July 2015. In between their UEFA Champions League qualifying campaign APOEL played three more friendly matches, beating 2–1 Ermis Aradippou, drawing 1–1 with Olympiakos Nicosia and winning Greek side Asteras Tripolis 3–2.

=== Cypriot Super Cup ===
APOEL's double success last season meant that Cypriot cup runners-up AEL Limassol would be their super cup opponents.

On 12 August 2015, APOEL was defeated 4–3 by AEL Limassol in a penalty shootout after a goalless draw at GSP Stadium. It was a match of few chances with both sides unable to muster any clear cut opportunity to get the breakthrough. The Cypriot Super Cup has no extra-time and so the match went straight to the lottery of a penalty shootout. After four accurate spot-kicks, Marios Antoniades shot wide at 2–2, while another miss for APOEL through Georgios Efrem turned the odds further into AEL’s favour. An excellent save by Boy Waterman and a successful spot kick from Tomás De Vincenti gave APOEL hope but at 3–3, AEL's captain Marios Nicolaou tuck away the decisive penalty and hand AEL the first trophy of the campaign.

=== Cypriot First Division ===
==== Regular season ====
On 22 August 2015, APOEL opened their competitive season with an impressive 5–1 win at Ammochostos Stadium against Ermis Aradippou. Tomás De Vincenti gave APOEL the lead after nine minutes and ten minutes later Luís Leal registered his first goal for the club to make it 2–0. Semir Štilić also got his first goal for the club in the 26th minute and Luís Leal grabbed his second goal of the game six minutes later. Andreas Vasilogiannis scored Ermis' consolation goal in the 56th minute and Constantinos Charalambides added a fifth goal for APOEL on 63 minutes with a finish from close range. On 30 August 2015, APOEL thrashed Pafos FC 6–2 at GSP Stadium in Temur Ketsbaia's debut as APOEL's head coach. Vinícius broke the deadlock after 33 minutes with a close range header from a Constantinos Charalambides' corner. Joël Damahou leveled the proceedings in the 39th minute after beating Boy Waterman with a powerful strike, but Tomás De Vincenti regained APOEL's lead two minutes later. Constantinos Charalambides scored his team's third goal at the hour mark, before Vinícius score his second from close range after a Nektarios Alexandrou's cross. Fernando Cavenaghi got his debut on 75 minutes and ten minutes later grabbed his first goal for APOEL with an amazing back-heel, before scoring his second goal deep into stoppage time after receiving Vander's pass. Georgian defender Gia Grigalava had scored for Pafos at the other end moments earlier with a sublime free-kick. On 12 September 2015, APOEL dropped their first league points of the season as they drew 2–2 away to AEK Larnaca. AEK took the lead late in the first half when José Kanté headed past APOEL goalkeeper Boy Waterman. AEK's former winger Vander levelled the score in the 68th minute with a powerful shot from the edge of the box, but parity lasted only seven minutes as Juanma Ortiz crossed for the unmarked Jorge Monteiro to score at the far post. APOEL's star signing Fernando Cavenaghi equalised with virtually his first touch after coming on as a substitute nine minutes from the end. On 21 September 2015, APOEL claimed a hard-fought 1–0 win over Doxa Katokopias at Makario Stadium and moved to the top of the standings, although the three points came at a price after Carlão, Iñaki Astiz and Pieros Sotiriou all suffered injuries. APOEL secured the victory in the 13th minute when Fernando Cavenaghi – who was celebrating his 32nd birthday – won and converted a penalty, firing beyond Alexandre Negri for his fourth goal in three games. On 26 September 2016, APOEL put their injury problems aside after putting on a dominant performance in a 4–0 thrashing of Aris Limassol at GSP Stadium. Fernando Cavenaghi opened the scoring from the penalty spot midway through the first half, while a goal by Georgios Efrem doubled APOEL's advantage before the break. Argentinian Tomás De Vincenti wrapped up the scoring with a brace, netting his goals at the beginning and end of the second half. On 5 October 2015, APOEL stayed top of the table alongside AEK Larnaca after breezing to a 5–0 win away to Enosis Neon Paralimni. APOEL took the lead on 12 minutes through a Tomás De Vincenti free-kick and Vander made it 2–0 at the half-hour mark with a shot from outside the area. Georgios Efrem scored the third on 51 minutes, before Fernando Cavenaghi score twice in 62nd and 65th minute. On 17 October 2015, APOEL continued their free-scoring league form under Temur Ketsbaia after thrashing AEL Limassol 6–0 at home and remained alone atop league standings. Georgios Efrem scored twice from outside the box in the first fifteen minutes to give his team an early two-goal lead. Fernando Cavenaghi grabbed his first hat-trick in Cyprus, while Kostakis Artymatas scored his first ever goal for APOEL. On 26 October 2015, APOEL stretched their lead at the top of the table to three points after an astonishing 9–0 win against Nea Salamina at Ammochostos Stadium. The carnage began early, as in the 2nd minute Georgios Efrem opened the scoring and it was already 4–0 by half-time after goals by Semir Štilić, Tomás De Vincenti and Dragan Žarković (own goal). Tomás De Vincenti netted another one early in the second half, while Vinícius and Piątkowski also scored to increase APOEL's lead. Fernando Cavenaghi scored twice in the last ten minutes, snatching a total of twelve goals in seven league matches. On 31 October 2015, APOEL maintained their lead atop the standings with a difficult 3–0 victory over Ethnikos Achnas at GSP Stadium. APOEL managed to break the deadlock after 69 minutes, when Constantinos Charalambides received a Fernando Cavenaghi's pass and from close range riffled the ball past Ethnikos' goalkeeper. Tomás De Vincenti doubled the advantage six minutes from time, while Vinícius added a third goal for APOEL in the last minute of the match. On 9 November 2015, APOEL's six-game winning streak came to an end after a thrilling 2–2 away draw against rivals Omonia. Omonia got off to the perfect start as Renato Margaça took advantage of a lapse in APOEL's defence and slid the ball under the advancing Boy Waterman. APOEL were level in the 15th minute after Fernando Cavenaghi created space for himself outside the box and sidefooted the ball past Omonia keeper. Fernando Cavenaghi gave APOEL the lead in the 51st minute after some great approach play involving Tomás De Vincenti and Vander, but Omonia equalized 15 minutes from time when Cillian Sheridan converted a penalty won by Nuno Assis. On 21 November 2015, APOEL suffered their first league defeat of the season, losing 0–2 at home to Anorthosis, but remained at the top of the table level on points with AEK Larnaca. In a game of few chances, especially in the opening 45 minutes, Anorthosis took the lead in the 69th minute through João Victor and made certain of the three points after Dino Ndlovu converted a late penalty. On 30 November 2015, a Fernando Cavenaghi penalty in the half hour mark was enough for APOEL to clinch all three points against bottom of the table Ayia Napa and move two points clear at the top the table after a difficult 1–0 away win. On 5 December 2015, APOEL suffered their consecutive home defeat after losing 0–1 to Apollon Limassol and dropped from the first place for the first time in the season. Abraham Gneki Guié's goal in the 58th minute was enough to give Apollon the three points and to drop APOEL to the third place of the league table, one point behind the leading duo AEK Larnaca and Anorthosis. On 14 December 2015, APOEL claimed a hard-fought 2–0 win over Ermis Aradippou at GSP Stadium and remained one point behind leaders AEK and Anorthosis. Fernando Cavenaghi scored his 16th league goal from the penalty spot in the 64th minute and eight minutes before the end Tomás De Vincenti scored from inside the box to seal the win for APOEL. On 19 December 2015, APOEL maintained the pressure on the leading duo after a difficult but deserved 1–0 win against Pafos FC at Pafiako Stadium. Vander scored the all-important goal in the 14th minute with a close range header after a Georgios Efrem cross. On 22 December 2015, APOEL fell to their third league defeat of the season after losing 1–2 at home to leaders AEK Larnaca and remained to the third place, four points behind AEK. João Guilherme gave APOEL a dream start when he scored after only three minutes, but AEK hit back after 31 minutes through David Català. The score remained 1–1 until the 72nd minute when André Alves hit the winner for AEK after an accurate low cross from Tete. On 3 January 2016, APOEL suffered a second consecutive home defeat after losing 1–2 to Doxa Katokopias and dropped to the fourth place, seven points behind leaders AEK Larnaca. Doxa took the lead in the 10th minute through Edmar, while APOEL drew level twenty minutes from the end when substitute Pieros Sotiriou beat Evagoras Hadjifrangiskou from close range. Doxa nicked the three points at the fifth minute of added time when APOEL defender Mário Sérgio handled in the box and Paulinho thumped the ball past Boy Waterman from the penalty spot. On 10 January 2016, APOEL bounced back from two consecutive league defeats by beating Aris Limassol 2–1 at Tsirion Stadium and moved up to the third place, seven points off top spot. Tomás De Vincenti scored on incredible solo effort to give APOEL the lead after 31 minutes, netting his tenth league goal of the season. Pieros Sotiriou doubled his team's advantage with a nice header in the 52nd minute, while Aris only managed to pull one goal back twenty minutes before the end with Mathew Boniface. On 17 January 2016, APOEL claimed a convincing 3–0 home win over Enosis Neon Paralimni and remained in third place, four points behind leaders AEK Larnaca. Nuno Morais broke the deadlock after 41 minutes when he tried to cross the ball toward the center of the box and tricked Enosis goalkeeper and four minutes later Fernando Cavenaghi scored from the penalty spot to double APOEL's lead. Giannis Gianniotas added a third one with a powerful shot from outside the area in the 63rd minute, to score his first goal for APOEL. On 24 January 2016, APOEL continued their surge back to the top with a convincing 1–0 win over AEL Limassol at Tsirion Stadium and closed the gap on league leaders AEK Larnaca to two points. The only goal of the game came early in the second half from Portuguese captain Nuno Morais who beat Matías Degra from just inside the area with a fierce drive. On 30 January 2016, APOEL continued their surge to the top with an impressive 6–1 home win against Nea Salamina and moved up to the second place, two points behind AEK Larnaca. The teams were level at half time after an early opener by Pieros Sotiriou and a penalty by Dimitar Makriev in the 14th minute. In the second half APOEL poured forward, proving too strong for Nea Salamina. Argentinian Tomás De Vincenti started and finished the second-half rout with Vander, Vinícius and Fernando Cavenaghi scoring in between. On 7 February 2016, APOEL beat Ethnikos Achna 3–1 at Dasaki Stadium and returned to top of the table, one point ahead of AEK Larnaca who lost 3–1 to Omonia. Pieros Sotiriou opened the scoring in the 17th minute, heading home from close range and three minutes before the break he doubled his side's lead, after taking the ball past Martin Bogatinov to finish into an empty net. Fernando Cavenaghi added a third from the penalty spot on 67 minute, while Marios Elia managed just to put Ethnikos on the scoresheet with a fine goal in the 90th minute. On 13 February 2016, APOEL easily beat arch-rivals Omonia 2–0 and remained atop league standings, one point ahead of AEK Larnaca. Former Omonia skipper Georgios Efrem haunted his old club after scoring twice in the first half. In the 9th minute, Tomás De Vincenti's cross from the right wing met by the Cypriot winger who finished well with his left inside the six-yard-box. Three minutes before the break Efrem grabbed his second, firing past the helpless Constantinos Panagi after receiving Giannis Gianniotas' low cross from the right side of the area. On 21 February 2016, APOEL beat Anorthosis 2–1 at Antonis Papadopoulos Stadium in the big match of the weekend to maintain their one-point lead over AEK Larnaca at the top of the table. Two first-half goals by Pieros Sotiriou and Tomás De Vincenti were enough to give APOEL the three points. Despite reducing the deficit early in the second half through Dino Ndlovu, Anorthosis did little else with APOEL always looking the more likely team to score. On 27 February 2016, APOEL had few problems against Ayia Napa as they defeated the already relegated team 3–0 at home. Georgios Efrem opened the score early in the game, with Vander and Efstathios Aloneftis completing the score. On 2 March 2016, APOEL won Apollon Limassol 1–0 at Tsirion Stadium and ended the regular season atop the league standings, one point ahead of AEK Larnaca. Georgios Efrem scored the winning goal just six minutes into the match, while Apollon missed a great chance to equalize five minutes later, when Alex da Silva's penalty hit the bar.

==== Play-offs ====
On 5 March 2016, in the opening round of the championship play-offs, APOEL managed a narrow 1–0 win away to Nea Salamina thanks to Carlão's strike late in the first half and opened up a three-point lead at the top, following AEK Larnaca's 2–2 draw with Apollon Limassol. On 12 March 2016, APOEL came from behind to beat arch-rivals Omonia 2–1 at GSP Stadium and preserved their three-point lead at the top of the table. Against the run of play, Omonia took the lead in 35th minute when a mix up in the APOEL defence allowed Bebê to weave past a couple of players and curl the ball past Urko Pardo. The lead lasted just seven minutes as APOEL piled on the pressure and were rewarded when Georgios Efrem blasted the ball past keeper from inside the box after receiving Zhivko Milanov's low cross from the right. The winner came just six minutes from time from Brazilian winger Vander who rolled the ball into an empty net after taking the rebound of Tomás De Vincenti's shoot which rattled the woodwork. On 20 March 2016, APOEL took a huge step towards their fourth consecutive league title after crushing challengers AEK Larnaca 3–0 at GSZ Stadium and opened up a six-point gap at the top of the table. It took APOEL just eight minutes to breach AEK's defense as Tomás De Vincenti raced clear and beat the advancing Toño with a clever chip. Six minutes before the break, Georgios Efrem received the ball on the edge of the penalty box and curled the ball into the top-left corner for a memorable goal. AEK had a chance of getting back into the game in the 50th minute after referee awarded them a controversial penalty, but APOEL's keeper Urko Pardo managed to block André Alves shot from the spot. While AEK had no answers to APOEL's relentless pressure and quick attacks, Pieros Sotiriou provided the icing on the cake in the 74th minute when he beat the keeper from close range. On 2 April 2016, APOEL's twelve-game winning streak came to an end after a 2–2 home draw against Apollon Limassol and AEK Larnaca took advantage to move to within four points of the top of the table. Apollon took the lead after 22 minutes through Anton Maglica, but the advantage lasted just two of minutes as Carlão headed past keeper Bruno Vale after a Georgios Efrem cross. Alex da Silva put Apollon back in the lead before the break with a well-taken free-kick, but APOEL were fortunate to salvage a point thanks to a last-minute equaliser by former Apollon captain, Giorgos Merkis. On 9 April 2016, APOEL dropped points for the second straight match after a 1–1 away draw against Anorthosis and allowed second placed AEK Larnaca to move to within two points of the top. Constantinos Laifis beat APOEL keeper Urko Pardo from 20 metres out to give Anorthosis the lead in the 70th minute, but APOEL managed to equalize two minutes from time thanks to a well-taken free-kick by Giannis Gianniotas. On 16 April 2016, APOEL moved a step closer to their third consecutive championship title as they increased their lead at the top to four points, following their 4–1 home win against Nea Salamina and AEK Larnaca's 2–2 draw against Apollon Limassol. APOEL had few problems in defeating Nea Salamina with Semir Štilić, Pieros Sotiriou, Nuno Morais and Constantinos Charalambides getting on the scoresheet, with ex-APOEL player Aldo Adorno getting Salamina's consolation goal. On 23 April 2016, under caretaker coach Giorgos Kostis, APOEL beat arch-rivals Omonia 2–0 at GSP Stadium and moved a step closer to their fourth consecutive league title, as they maintained their four points advantage from AEK Larnaca, only three matches before the end. Greek winger Giannis Gianniotas was the hero for APOEL who scored both goals, after taking advantage of poor Omonia defending. The first goal came midway through the first half when he headed past Omonia keeper after Nektarios Alexandrou's cross from the left. A minute before the break, Pieros Sotiriou stole the ball from Omonia's defenders and passed to Gianniotas who slotted the ball past the oncoming goalkeeper from inside the area. On 28 April 2016, APOEL claimed their fourth consecutive league title after overcoming second placed AEK Larnaca 2–0 at a packed GSP Stadium. APOEL, which a few days ago parted ways with coach Temur Ketsbaia, had headed into the game four points ahead of AEK with caretaker manager Giorgos Kostis on charge. André Alves had missed the game's first big chance before a mistake by AEK defender led to a quick counter-attack involving Giannis Gianniotas and Vander and finished off by Pieros Sotiriou who had rounded the goalkeeper before scoring into an empty net just before halftime. Twenty minutes after the break APOEL made it 2–0, when Giannis Gianniotas was fouled in the area and the Greek winger picked himself up to score the penalty to secure APOEL's 25th Cypriot First Division title. On 7 May 2016, champions APOEL decided to rest many first-team players and saw their 17-match unbeaten run ended after suffering a 1–0 loss at Apollon Limassol thanks to a Luka Stojanović strike at the half-hour mark. On 15 May 2016, APOEL drew 2–2 at home against Anorthosis to break the club's best league scoring record with 91 goals and collect 83 points, the most points ever collected in a single season. Pieros Sotiriou put the champions ahead in the 12th minute but Efthimis Koulouris levelled just before the break. APOEL took the lead again through Tomás De Vincenti amazing free-kick with 56 minutes on the clock, but seven minutes later Anorthosis equalized via Andreas Makris. After the end of the match, celebrations followed as the APOEL's captain Constantinos Charalambides lifted the Cypriot First Division trophy in front of jubilant APOEL fans in the packed GSP Stadium.

=== Cypriot Cup ===
==== Second round ====
APOEL won the Cypriot cup last season and as such entered the second round of this season competition. APOEL were drawn to face Cypriot First Division side Nea Salamina.

On 13 January 2016, APOEL secured a narrow 1–0 advantage over Nea Salamina at Ammochostos Stadium, thanks to a long-range goal from Nuno Morais goal just after the hour mark. On 27 January 2016, APOEL secured their place in Cypriot cup quarter-finals after beating again Nea Salamina 3–2 at Nicosia, to seal a 4–2 aggregate victory. APOEL got off to a flying start, as Argentine striker Fernando Cavenaghi opened the scoring after just nine minutes and Tomás De Vincenti doubled his team's advantage in the 36th minute. Early into the second-half Vinícius added his name on to the scoresheet to make it 3–0 (4–0 on aggregate), ending any faint hopes of a remarkable Nea Salamina comeback. The visitors managed to register a goal through Ivan Ćurjurić who converted a penalty in the 74th minute, and two minutes later they added a second via a thumping Liliu header.

==== Quarter-finals ====
In the Cypriot cup quarter-finals, APOEL were drawn to face Cypriot First Division side Aris Limassol. In the first leg of their Cypriot Cup quarter-finals clash on 10 February 2016, APOEL were held to a 1–1 draw by Aris Limassol at GSP Stadium. Randy opened the scoring for the visitors in the 15th minute, but their joy was short-lived as APOEL hit back just three minutes later through a Fernando Cavenaghi penalty, leaving the tie evenly balanced. On 17 February 2016, APOEL made it through to the semi-finals of the Cypriot Cup after a 3–1 win over Aris Limassol at Tsirion Stadium. Georgios Efrem broke the deadlock four minutes after the restart, but Markos Maragoudakis equalized for Aris just after the hour mark. Thirteen minutes before the end Tomás De Vincenti gave again APOEL the lead and Efstathios Aloneftis four minutes later kept Temur Ketsbaia's side on track for yet another domestic double.

==== Semi-finals ====
In the Cypriot cup semi-finals, APOEL were drawn to face Apollon Limassol. On 6 April 2016, in the first leg of their semi-final clash, APOEL were held to a 1–1 draw in Nicosia by Apollon Limassol. Apollon took the lead through Abraham Gneki Guié in the 21st minute after Giorgos Merkis' mistake and Pieros Sotiriou equalized just eight minutes later, with nobody unable to break the deadlock in the second half. On 20 April 2016, APOEL were defeated by Apollon Limassol 5–4 in a penalty shoot-out after a 1–1 draw at Tsirion Stadium and eliminated from the Cypriot Cup final, missing a great chance to defend their title for a third consecutive season. Alex Da Silva gave Apollon the lead with a direct free-kick after 45 minutes, but the lead was short-lived, with Georgios Efrem equalizing two minutes later, just a few seconds before the end of the first half. Despite Vinícius being sent off after only five minutes of extra time and APOEL played with ten players for 25 minutes, there were no more goals until the end of the 120 minutes and the match went to penalties. Both sides scored all their first four penalties, before APOEL's defender Iñaki Astiz saw his effort saved by Apollon keeper Bruno Vale and Dejan Mezga made no mistake sending the ball past Urko Pardo to send Apollon to the final. On 21 April 2016, one day after APOEL's elimination in the Cypriot Cup semi-finals, coach Temur Ketsbaia's contract with APOEL was mutually terminated.

=== UEFA Champions League ===
==== Second qualifying round ====
APOEL won the Cypriot league last season and as such entered the second qualifying round of the 2015–16 UEFA Champions League. APOEL were drawn to start their campaign against FK Vardar.

On 14 July 2015, APOEL endured a frustrating opening Champions League campaign after being held to a 0–0 home draw by FK Vardar in the first leg of the second qualifying round. Domingos Paciência's side had squandered numerous chances in the game particularly after 40th minute, following a cagey opening to the game. FK Vardar rarely threatened Boy Waterman's goal while their own keeper Tome Pačovski was called into action on numerous occasions to foil Luís Leal, Tomás De Vincenti and Georgios Efrem.

On 21 July 2015, APOEL survived an early scare in their Champions League qualifying campaign, scraping through the second qualifying round on the away goals rule with a nervous 1–1 draw at Skopje over FK Vardar. Except some problems in finding the final touch, APOEL were always the superior team against Vardar and Tomás De Vincenti's goal on 60 minutes was enough to see them through the third qualifying round, despite Blagojče Ljamčevski's late equalizer.

==== Third qualifying round ====
APOEL were drawn to face Danish champions FC Midtjylland in the third qualifying round of the 2015–16 UEFA Champions League.

On 28 July 2015, APOEL took a step towards the UEFA Champions League play-offs after an important 2–1 win against FC Midtjylland at MCH Arena. Tomás De Vincenti scored one and forced an own goal from Kian Hansen in the first half, while new signing Luís Leal missed a chance to make the score 3–0 before Jakob Poulsen score a late goal for Midtjylland.

On 4 August 2015, ten-men APOEL squeezed into the Champions League play-offs after prevailing against FC Midtjylland on the away goals rule, despite a shock 0–1 home defeat. APOEL got off to the worst possible start when Jakob Poulsen's resulting free-kick floated over the defence and met the head of Erik Sviatchenko who steered the ball past Boy Waterman. Then came more despair for APOEL when the referee handed the Brazilian midfielder Vinícius a straight red card for a strong challenge on Pione Sisto. The second half was a cagey affair with APOEL reluctant leak another goal, while Midtjylland players launched countless ineffective long balls into Boy Waterman's area. Albeit under extremely difficult circumstances, APOEL secured European group stage football for the fifth time in seven seasons and a place in the UEFA Champions League play-offs draw.

==== Play-off round ====
APOEL were drawn to face Kazakh champions FC Astana in the play-off round of the Champions League, as they attempt to reach the group stages for the fourth time in their history.

On 18 August 2015, APOEL fell to a 1–0 defeat against FC Astana at Astana Arena in their Champions League play-off first leg match, leaving themselves with plenty of work to do in the return match in Nicosia. Domingos Paciência's side were punished for a piece of poor defending on 14 minutes to allow Bauyrzhan Dzholchiev to score the game’s only goal, while APOEL once again failed to score, despite creating chances for a crucial away goal.

On 26 August 2015, APOEL were very close to qualify for the UEFA Champions League group stage, before a late Astana goal saw their hopes evaporate after a 1–1 draw at GSP Stadium. Trailing 1–0 from the first leg in Kazakhstan, APOEL had dominated possession in the second leg in Nicosia but failed to take their chances against seemingly weaker opposition. On the hour mark, Semir Štilić whipped in a wonderful free-kick beyond the reach of the Astana keeper to bring APOEL level in the tie, but a late equaliser from Nemanja Maksimović sent APOEL crashing out of the UEFA Champions League.

APOEL’s hopes of a fourth Champions League group stage campaign came to an end, but their European season continued in the group stage of the UEFA Europa League. Also, following the team's failure to reach the UEFA Champions League group stage, Domingos Paciência was fired two days later and he was replaced by Georgian coach Temur Ketsbaia, who signed a two-year contract with the club.

=== UEFA Europa League ===
==== Group stage ====

APOEL's 2015–16 UEFA Europa League starting line-up that managed to beat Asteras Tripolis 2–1 at home and secured the club's only victory in Group K.

After being eliminated by FC Astana in the play-off round of the Champions League, APOEL were automatically transferred to the group stage of the UEFA Europa League, drawn in Group K alongside Schalke 04, Sparta Prague and Asteras Tripolis.

On 17 September 2015, APOEL's Europa League campaign got off to bad start as they suffered a 3–0 defeat by Schalke 04 at GSP Stadium in Nicosia. Schalke had the game wrapped up inside the opening half-an-hour after goals from Joël Matip and Klaas-Jan Huntelaar, while Max Meyer and Johannes Geis had also rattled the crossbar early on. APOEL's hopes for a positive result ended after Huntelaar's second goal in the 71st minute, while Tomás De Vincenti was sent off for the hosts 13 minutes before the end for swearing at the referee. On 1 October 2015, APOEL fell to a second straight defeat in the Europa League, going down to a 2–0 loss to Sparta Prague at Generali Arena, making the club's aspirations of reaching the next round complicated. APOEL's already tough challenge was made even more difficult due to the absence of six first team players who were suffering injuries. On 23 minutes, a chipped ball to the angle of the penalty area found David Lafata who picked out an unmarked Kehinde Fatai to tap the ball in from a few yards out. Just moments after APOEL came very close to a leveller with Georgios Efrem close range effort, Sparta sprung forward in numbers and a far post cross found Jakub Brabec who made no mistake with the finish, putting his team in front by two goals on the hour mark. On 22 October 2015, APOEL came from behind to end an eight-match wait for a home win and earned their first points in Group K after beating Asteras Tripolis 2–1 at GSP Stadium. After just eight minutes, Argentinian Facundo Bertoglio crossed from the left to his countryman Braian Lluy who calmly placed the ball beyond Boy Waterman to hand Asteras a shock early lead. On 16 minutes, the game was suspended because of floodlight failure, leading to a delay of 12 minutes. The breakthrough for APOEL came in the eighth minute of first-half stoppage time thanks to a Fernando Cavenaghi goal from the penalty spot. In the second half, APOEL kept pushing on for another goal and the winner came in the 59th minute when Carlão headed the ball into the net after Semir Štilić's corner. The visitors failed to threaten late on and APOEL comfortably closed out the game to seal a crucial three points which put them back in contention to qualify for the knockout phase. On 5 November 2015, APOEL's chances of making the knockout phase of the Europa League were dealt a huge blow as they suffered a 2–0 defeat at the hands of Asteras Tripolis at Theodoros Kolokotronis Stadium. APOEL got off to a nightmare start as a poor clearance from Marios Antoniades fell to Facundo Bertoglio who smashed the ball into the roof of the net to make it 1–0 after only two minutes. From that point on, APOEL began to dominate proceedings and were almost level when Semir Štilić's strike hit the post, but Asteras dealt a killer blow to their chances as they doubled their lead on the stroke of half-time after a close header by Apostolos Giannou. APOEL had been looking for a spark during the second half but it simply would not come as they slumped to their third defeat and sitting bottom of the group with just three points. On 26 November 2015, a late Schalke 04 winner at Veltins-Arena was enough to knock APOEL out of UEFA Europa League and to send the German side to the next round. Despite Schalke's first half dominance, the biggest chances of the night fell to APOEL midway through the second half when Nuno Morais and Vander failed to beat Schalke's goalkeeper Ralf Fährmann from close range. But just when it looked like APOEL had earned a commendable draw, Schalke grabbed a winner with just four minutes remaining after Sascha Riether's low cross found Eric Maxim Choupo-Moting in the box and the forward found the net to make it 1–0. Two minutes later, Schalke awarded a penalty but Boy Waterman stooped low to save Dennis Aogo's kick. On 10 December 2015, APOEL suffered a 1–3 defeat against Sparta Prague at GSP Stadium and ended a miserable Europa League campaign bottom of Group K with only three points, after one win and five defeats in six games. Fernando Cavenaghi scored a fantastic drive after only six minutes to give APOEL an early lead, but Sparta Prague managed to equalize on the hour mark thank to a lucky deflected goal by Lukáš Juliš. Experienced striker David Lafata came off the bench on 74 minutes and just three minutes later grabbed the goal that would give his side the lead. Three minutes before the end Lafata scored again to make it 1–3 with a neat finish. The result, in the end, was of little meaning for either side as victory for Schalke 04 over Asteras Tripolis in the group's other game meant the Germans claimed top spot with Sparta finishing second, while APOEL finished bottom.

== Current squad ==
Last Update: 2 April 2016

Note: Flags indicate national team as defined under FIFA eligibility rules; some limited exceptions apply. Players may hold more than one non-FIFA nationality.

No.	Pos.	Nation	Player
3	DF	BRA	João Guilherme
4	MF	CYP	Kostakis Artymatas
5	DF	BRA	Carlão
7	MF	CYP	Georgios Efrem
8	MF	ARG	Tomás De Vincenti
10	MF	CYP	Constantinos Charalambides (captain)
11	MF	CYP	Nektarios Alexandrou (vice-captain)
15	DF	CYP	Marios Antoniades
16	MF	BRA	Vinícius
17	MF	BIH	Semir Štilić
19	FW	CYP	Michalis Charalambous
20	FW	CYP	Pieros Sotiriou
21	DF	BUL	Zhivko Milanov
23	DF	ESP	Iñaki Astiz
25	DF	CYP	Rafael Anastasiou
26	MF	POR	Nuno Morais (3rd captain)
30	DF	CYP	Giorgos Merkis

No.	Pos.	Nation	Player
27	FW	POL	Mateusz Piątkowski
28	DF	POR	Mário Sérgio (4th captain)
31	MF	CYP	Vasilios Papafotis
32	DF	CYP	Andreas Assiotis
40	MF	CYP	Demetris Charalambous
44	DF	CYP	Nicholas Ioannou
45	MF	CYP	Georgios Christodoulou
46	FW	CYP	Efstathios Aloneftis
55	MF	POR	Estrela
70	MF	GRE	Giannis Gianniotas (on loan from Olympiacos)
77	MF	BRA	Vander Vieira
78	GK	ESP	Urko Pardo
79	FW	ARG	Fernando Cavenaghi
88	GK	CYP	Tasos Kissas
95	MF	CYP	Christos Djamas
96	GK	CYP	Giorgos Tasouris
99	GK	NED	Boy Waterman

For recent transfers, see List of Cypriot football transfers summer 2015.
Also, see List of Cypriot football transfers winter 2015–16.

=== Out on loan ===
Note: Flags indicate national team as defined under FIFA eligibility rules; some limited exceptions apply. Players may hold more than one non-FIFA nationality.

No.	Pos.	Nation	Player
1	GK	ESP	Jordi Codina (on loan at Pafos FC)
14	MF	CYP	Alex Konstantinou (on loan at Doxa Katokopias)

Loan deals expire at the end of 2015–16 season

=== International players ===
- (Bosnia and Herzegovina) Semir Štilić
- (Bulgaria) Zhivko Milanov
- (Greece) Giannis Gianniotas

- (Cyprus) Nektarios Alexandrou
- (Cyprus) Efstathios Aloneftis
- (Cyprus) Marios Antoniades
- (Cyprus) Kostakis Artymatas
- (Cyprus) Constantinos Charalambides
- (Cyprus) Georgios Efrem
- (Cyprus) Nicholas Ioannou
- (Cyprus) Tasos Kissas
- (Cyprus) Giorgos Merkis
- (Cyprus) Pieros Sotiriou

- (Portugal) Estrela (U-20)
- (Cyprus) Nicholas Ioannou (U-21)
- (Cyprus) Vasilios Papafotis (U-21)
- (Cyprus) Georgios Christodoulou (U-21)
- (Cyprus) Christos Djamas (U-21)
- (Cyprus) Giorgos Tasouris (U-21)
- (Cyprus) Rafael Anastasiou (U-21)
- (Cyprus) Demetris Charalambous (U-19)
- (Cyprus) Michalis Charalambous (U-19)

=== Foreign players ===
EU Nationals

- (Portugal) (Europe) Nuno Morais
- (Portugal) (Europe) Mário Sérgio
- (Spain) (Europe) Iñaki Astiz
- (Spain) (Belgium) (Europe) Urko Pardo
- (Netherlands) (Europe) Boy Waterman
- (Poland) (Europe) Mateusz Piątkowski
- (Bulgaria) (Europe) Zhivko Milanov
- (Greece) (Europe) Giannis Gianniotas
- (Portugal) (Angola) (Europe) Estrela

EU Nationals (Dual citizenship)

- (Argentina) (Italy) (Europe) Tomás De Vincenti
- (Argentina) (Italy) (Europe) Fernando Cavenaghi

Non-EU Nationals

- (Brazil) João Guilherme
- (Brazil) Vinícius
- (Brazil) Carlão
- (Brazil) Vander Vieira
- (Bosnia and Herzegovina) Semir Štilić

=== Squad changes ===
In:

No.	Pos.	Nat.	Name	Age	EU	Moving from	Type	Transfer window	Ends	Transfer fee	Source
95	DM	(Cyprus)	Christos Djamas	19	EU	(Cyprus) Ayia Napa	Loan return →	Summer	2016	Free	—
90	RB	(Brazil)	Guilherme Choco	25	EU	(Bulgaria) Ludogorets Razgrad	Transfer ✓	Summer	2017	Free	apoelfc.com.cy
77	LW	(Brazil)	Vander Vieira	26	Non-EU	(Cyprus) AEK Larnaca	Transfer ✓	Summer	2018	€100K	apoelfc.com.cy
1	GK	(Spain)	Jordi Codina	33	EU	(Spain) Getafe	Transfer ✓	Summer	2017	Free	apoelfc.com.cy
17	AM	(Bosnia and Herzegovina)	Semir Štilić	27	Non-EU	(Poland) Wisła Kraków	Transfer ✓	Summer	2018	Free	apoelfc.com.cy
13	CM	(Cyprus)	Constantinos Makrides	33	EU	(Ukraine) Metalurh Donetsk	Transfer ✓	Summer	2017	Free	apoelfc.com.cy
9	CF	(Portugal)	Luís Leal	28	EU	(United Arab Emirates) Al-Ittihad Kalba	Transfer ✓	Summer	2017	Free	apoelfc.com.cy
23	CB	(Spain)	Iñaki Astiz	31	EU	(Poland) Legia Warsaw	Transfer ✓	Summer	2017	Free	apoelfc.com.cy
27	CF	(Poland)	Mateusz Piątkowski	30	EU	(Poland) Jagiellonia Białystok	Transfer ✓	Summer	2017	Free	apoelfc.com.cy
99	GK	(Netherlands)	Boy Waterman	31	EU	(Turkey) Karabükspor	Transfer ✓	Summer	2017	Free	apoelfc.com.cy
79	CF	(Argentina)	Fernando Cavenaghi	31	EU	(Argentina) River Plate	Transfer ✓	Summer	2017	Free	apoelfc.com.cy
21	RB	(Bulgaria)	Zhivko Milanov	31	EU	(Bulgaria) Levski Sofia	Transfer ✓	Winter	2017	Free	apoelfc.com.cy
70	RW	(Greece)	Giannis Gianniotas	22	EU	(Greece) Olympiacos	Loan →	Winter	2016	Free	apoelfc.com.cy
30	CB	(Cyprus)	Giorgos Merkis	31	EU	(Cyprus) Apollon Limassol	Transfer ✓	Winter	2017	Free	apoelfc.com.cy
55	DM	(Portugal)	Estrela	20	EU	(United States) Orlando City	Transfer ✓	Winter	2019	Free	apoelfc.com.cy

Total expenditure: ▼€100K

Out:

No.	Pos.	Nat.	Name	Age	EU	Moving to	Type	Transfer window	Transfer fee	Source
22	GK	(Greece)	Dionisis Chiotis	37	EU	(Greece) Panelefsiniakos	End of contract ✗	Summer	Free	apoelfc.com.cy
9	CF	(Republic of Ireland)	Cillian Sheridan	26	EU	(Cyprus) Omonia	End of contract ✗	Summer	Free	apoelfc.com.cy
6	LB	(Norway)	John Arne Riise	34	EU	(India) Delhi Dynamos	End of contract ✗	Summer	Free	apoelfc.com.cy
8	CM	(Portugal)	Tiago Gomes	29	EU	Retirement	End of contract ✗	Summer	Free	apoelfc.com.cy
25	CB	(Cyprus)	Andreas Christofides	22	EU	(Cyprus) Olympiakos	End of contract ✗	Summer	Free	apoelfc.com.cy
13	DM	(Germany)	Martin Lanig	30	EU	Retirement	Mutual consent; / Retirement; w; =S		Free	apoelfc.com.cy
79	CF	(Algeria)	Rafik Djebbour	31	EU	(Greece) AEK Athens	End of contract ✗	Summer	Free	sigmalive.com
73	CB	(Brazil)	Kaká	34	Non-EU	(Portugal) Tondela	End of contract ✗	Summer	Free	sigmalive.com
14	RW	(Cyprus)	Alex Konstantinou	23	EU	(Cyprus) Doxa Katokopias	Loan →	Summer	Free	sigmalive.com
35	LW	(Cyprus)	Marios Pechlivanis	20	EU	Austria Wien II	End of contract ✗	Summer	Free	sigmalive.com
34	RW	(North Macedonia)	Valmir Nafiu	21	Non-EU	(Albania) KF Skënderbeu	Mutual consent ✗	Winter	Free	apoelfc.com.cy
90	RB	(Brazil)	Guilherme Choco	25	EU	(Brazil) Sampaio Corrêa	Mutual consent ✗	Winter	Free	apoelfc.com.cy
1	GK	(Spain)	Jordi Codina	33	EU	(Cyprus) Pafos FC	Loan →	Winter	Free	apoelfc.com.cy
13	CM	(Cyprus)	Constantinos Makrides	33	EU	(Cyprus) Apollon Limassol	Mutual consent ✗	Winter	Free	apoelfc.com.cy
9	CF	(Portugal)	Luís Leal	28	EU	(Paraguay) Cerro Porteño	Transfer ✓	Winter	Undisclosed	apoelfc.com.cy

Total income: ▲€0

Last updated: 1 February 2016

== Club ==
=== Management ===
Position	Staff
Head coach	(Greece) Georgios Kostis
Assistant coach	(Cyprus) Marinos Satsias
Goalkeeper coach	(Serbia) Dragoslav Jevrić
Fitness coach	(Cyprus) Andreas Neophytou
Team doctor	(Greece) Nikolaos Tzouroudis
Football director	(Serbia) Svetozar Šapurić

Last updated: 20 April 2016
Source: apoelfc.com.cy

=== Kit ===
Supplier: Puma
Sponsor(s): Mora Thavmata, Bank of Cyprus, Bet on alfa.

Home	Away	Third

Source: apoelfc.com.cy

=== Other information ===
Chairman	(Cyprus) Prodromos Petrides
Ground (capacity and dimensions)	GSP Stadium (22,859 / 105x68 m)

Source: apoelfc.com.cy, apoelfc.com.cy

== Squad stats ==
				Total						Cypriot First Division					Cypriot Cup					Cypriot Super Cup					Champions League & Europa League				
Country	N	P	Name	GS	A	Mins.	Gls.	Y	R	A	Mins.	Gls.	Y	R	A	Mins.	Gls.	Y	R	A	Mins.	Gls.	Y	R	A	Mins.	Gls.	Y	R
(Spain)	1	GK	Codina																										
(Brazil)	3	CB	João Guilherme	22	30	2086	1	4		21	1467	1	3		3	270		1		1	23				5	326			
(Cyprus)	4	DM	Artymatas	30	35	2778	1	8		26	2073	1	5		2	194		1							7	511		2	
(Brazil)	5	CB	Carlão	38	40	3252	3	7		25	2114	2	5		3	192		1		1	67				11	879	1	1	
(Cyprus)	7	RM	Efrem	30	35	2285	13	6		24	1549	11	3		4	331	2	1		1	90				6	315		2	
(Argentina)	8	AM	De Vincenti	38	40	3316	19	15	3	26	2202	15	9	2	4	239	2	3		1	90		1		9	785	2	2	1
(São Tomé and Príncipe)	9	CF	Leal	7	8	634	2			1	90	2								1	23				6	521			
(Cyprus)	10	RM	Charalambides	11	27	1224	4	3		19	892	4	2		2	180									6	152		1	
(Cyprus)	11	LM	Alexandrou	22	30	2168		7		20	1494		6		4	315									6	359		1	
(Cyprus)	13	CM	Makrides	16	24	1460		4		14	694		1							1	90				9	676		3	
(Cyprus)	15	LB	Antoniades	27	32	2127		8		18	1127		5		4	257		1		1	90				9	653		2	
(Brazil)	16	CM	Vinícius	41	44	3505	6	4	2	29	2411	5	1		5	334	1	1	1	1	74				9	686		2	1
(Bosnia and Herzegovina)	17	AM	Štilić	19	31	1725	4	2		16	804	3			6	371		1		1	67				8	483	1	1	
(Cyprus)	19	CF	Charalambous		1	19				1	19																		
(Cyprus)	20	CF	Sotiriou	26	38	2294	11	3		26	1711	10	2		5	317	1								7	266		1	
(Bulgaria)	21	RB	Milanov	22	22	1953		6		16	1428		5		6	525		1											
(Spain)	23	CB	Astiz	26	30	2412		3		16	1285		3		3	255				1	90				10	782			
(Cyprus)	25	CB	Anastasiou	1	2	105				1	15														1	90			
(Portugal)	26	DM	Morais	52	53	4687	4	8		34	3021	3	8		6	570	1			1	16				12	1080			
(Poland)	27	CF	Piątkowski	6	25	675	1			14	296	1			2	21				1	90				8	268			
(Portugal)	28	RB	Mário Sérgio	33	36	3045		4		21	1782		3		3	183				1	90				11	990		1	
(Cyprus)	30	CB	Merkis	16	17	1490	1	6	1	13	1101	1	5		4	389		1	1										
(Cyprus)	31	AM	Papafotis		2	17		1		2	17		1																
(Cyprus)	32	RB	Assiotis		1	21				1	21																		
(North Macedonia)	34	RW	Nafiu																										
(Cyprus)	40	CM	Charalambous																										
(Cyprus)	44	LB	Ioannou	2	7	314		1		5	276		1		1	33									1	5			
(Cyprus)	45	DM	Christodoulou		1	10				1	10																		
(Cyprus)	46	LW	Aloneftis	1	11	330	2	1		10	301	1	1		1	29	1												
(Portugal)	55	DM	Estrela		1	19				1	19																		
(Greece)	70	RW	Gianniotas	19	20	1564	5	6		17	1323	5	5		3	241		1											
(Brazil)	77	LW	Vander	25	44	2458	6	11		30	1622	6	5		4	181									10	655		6	
(Spain)	78	GK	Pardo	21	21	1883	-14	2		16	1403	-9	2		5	480	-5												
(Argentina)	79	CF	Cavenaghi	19	26	1699	23	1		18	1220	19			3	234	2								5	245	2	1	
(Cyprus)	88	GK	Kissas	1	1	90	-1			1	90	-1																	
(Cyprus)	95	DM	Djamas																										
(Cyprus)	96	GK	Tasouris																										
(Netherlands)	99	GK	Waterman	33	34	3007	-34	2		20	1747	-16	1		1	90	-1			1	90				12	1080	-17	1	

Last updated: 15 May 2016
Source: Match reports in competitive matches
Ordered by start team, game starts and position on pitch (from back right to front left)
0 shown as blank
Country: when 2 flags, 1st flag = country that plays for internationally, 2nd flag = country of birth; N = number on jersey; P = Position; Name = Name on jersey (for more extended name, pause the mouse pointer on the name); GS = Game Started; A = Appearances.

=== Top scorers ===
R	Player	Position	League	Cup	Super Cup	Europe^{1}	Total
1	(Argentina) Cavenaghi	CF	19	2	0	2	23
2	(Argentina) De Vincenti	AM	15	2	0	2	19
3	(Cyprus) Efrem	RM	11	2	0	0	13
4	(Cyprus) Sotiriou	CF	10	1	0	0	11
5	(Brazil) Vander	LW	6	0	0	0	6
5	(Brazil) Vinícius	CM	5	1	0	0	6
7	(Greece) Gianniotas	RW	5	0	0	0	5
8	(Cyprus) Charalambides	RM	4	0	0	0	4
8	(Bosnia and Herzegovina) Štilić	AM	3	0	0	1	4
8	(Portugal) Morais	DM	3	1	0	0	4
11	(Brazil) Carlão	CB	2	0	0	1	3
12	(São Tomé and Príncipe) Leal	CF	2	0	0	0	2
12	(Cyprus) Aloneftis	LW	1	1	0	0	2
14	(Cyprus) Artymatas	DM	1	0	0	0	1
14	(Brazil) João Guilherme	CB	1	0	0	0	1
14	(Poland) Piątkowski	CF	1	0	0	0	1
14	(Cyprus) Merkis	CB	1	0	0	0	1
Own goals			1	0	0	1	2
TOTAL			91	10	0	7	108

Last updated: 15 May 2016
^{1}Including both UEFA Champions League and Europa League competitions.
Source: Match reports in Competitive matches

=== Captains ===
1. (Cyprus) Constantinos Charalambides
2. (Cyprus) Nektarios Alexandrou
3. (Portugal) Nuno Morais
4. (Portugal) Mário Sérgio

Source: apoelfcofficial

== Pre-season friendlies ==
25 June 2015 Friendly	APOEL (Cyprus)	2–0	(Lithuania) FK Atlantas	Arena Mistrzów, Gniewino
18:30 EET	Štilić 80'; Papafotis 82'	Report

27 June 2015 Friendly	Lechia Gdańsk (Poland)	4–1	(Cyprus) APOEL	MOSiR Stadium, Gdańsk
18:00 EET	Wawrzyniak 26' (pen.); Buksa 46'; Kopka 86'; Gierszewski 87'	Report	Piątkowski 64'	Attendance: 1,000; Referee: (Poland) Paweł Dreschel

30 June 2015 Friendly	Arka Gdynia (Poland)	2–1	(Cyprus) APOEL	Arena Mistrzów, Gniewino
18:00 EET	Siemaszko 60'; Warcholak 75'	Report	Sotiriou 76'	Attendance: 200

3 July 2015 Friendly	Lech Poznań (Poland)	0–0	(Cyprus) APOEL	Arena Mistrzów, Gniewino
19:00 EET		Report
Note: 60-minute match

4 July 2015 Friendly	Lech Poznań (Poland)	3–0	(Cyprus) APOEL	Arena Mistrzów, Gniewino
20:00 EET	Kamiński 33'; Thomalla 56'; Kownacki 76'	Report		Referee: (Poland) Łukasz Karski

8 July 2015 Friendly	Doxa Katokopias (Cyprus)	0–4	(Cyprus) APOEL	Makario Stadium, Nicosia
20:00 EET		Report	Leal 18'; Astiz 68'; Xenofontos 83' (o.g.); Charalambides 90'	Attendance: 1,500

23 July 2015 Friendly	APOEL (Cyprus)	2–1	(Cyprus) Ermis Aradippou	Archangelos Training Centre, Nicosia
19:00 EET	Alexandrou 40'; Nafiu 82'	Report	Da Silva 30' (pen.)	Attendance: Behind closed doors

30 July 2015 Friendly	APOEL (Cyprus)	1–1	(Cyprus) Olympiakos	Archangelos Training Centre, Nicosia
19:00 EET	Sotiriou 82'	Report	Mashinya 9'	Attendance: Behind closed doors

7 August 2015 Friendly	APOEL (Cyprus)	3–2	(Greece) Asteras Tripolis	Makario Stadium, Nicosia
20:00 EET	Charalambides 30'; Piątkowski 34'; Artymatas 72'	Report	Giannou 10'; Bertoglio 55' (pen.)	Attendance: 500; Referee: (Cyprus) Kyriakos Kyriakou

4 September 2015 Friendly	APOEL (Cyprus)	2–0	(Cyprus) Olympiakos	Archangelos Training Centre, Nicosia
18:30 EET	De Vincenti 20'; Cavenaghi 29'	Report		Attendance: Behind closed doors
Note: 80-minute match

== Competitions ==
=== Overall ===
Competition	Started round	Final position / round	First match	Last match
Cypriot First Division	—	Winners	22 August 2015	15 May 2016
UEFA Champions League	Second qualifying round	Play-off round	14 July 2015	26 August 2015
UEFA Europa League	Group stage	Group stage	17 September 2015	10 December 2015
Cypriot Cup	Second round	Semi-finals	13 January 2016	20 April 2016
Cypriot Super Cup	Final	Runners-up	12 August 2015	

Updated to match played 15 May 2016
Source: Competitions

=== Cypriot First Division ===
==== League table ====
Pos	Team	Pld	W	D	L	GF	GA	GD	Pts	Qualification or relegation
1	APOEL	26	20	2	4	72	18	+54	62	Qualification for the championship round
2	AEK Larnaca	26	19	4	3	47	17	+30	61	Qualification for the championship round
3	Anorthosis Famagusta	26	15	7	4	48	22	+26	52	Qualification for the championship round
4	Omonia	26	14	7	5	46	24	+22	49 (Note: Head-to-head record: Omonia 0–0 Apollon, Apollon 0–0 Omonia.)	Qualification for the championship round
5	Apollon Limassol	26	14	7	5	41	24	+17	49	Qualification for the championship round

Source: UEFA, CFA, Soccerway
Rules for classification: 1) Points; 2) Head-to-head points; 3) Head-to-head goal difference; 4) Head-to-head goals scored; 5) Head-to-head away goals scored (only if two teams); 6) Goal difference; 7) Goals scored; 8) Play-off (only if deciding championship round, relegation round or relegation).

==== Results summary ====
Overall								Home						Away					
Pld	W	D	L	GF	GA	GD	Pts	W	D	L	GF	GA	GD	W	D	L	GF	GA	GD
36	26	5	5	91	26	+65	83	12	2	4	49	16	+33	14	3	1	42	10	+32

Last updated: 15 May 2016.
Source: UEFA

==== Results by round ====
Round	1	2	3	4	5	6	7	8	9	10	11	12	13	14	15	16	17	18	19	20	21	22	23	24	25	26	27	28	29	30	31	32	33	34	35	36
Ground	A	H	A	A	H	A	H	A	H	A	H	A	H	H	A	H	H	A	H	A	H	A	H	A	H	A	A	H	A	H	A	H	A	H	A	H
Result	W	W	D	W	W	W	W	W	W	D	L	W	L	W	W	L	L	W	W	W	W	W	W	W	W	W	W	W	W	D	D	W	W	W	L	D
Position	1	1	2	1	1	1	1	1	1	1	1	1	3	3	3	3	4	3	3	3	2	1	1	1	1	1	1	1	1	1	1	1	1	1	1	1

Updated to match(es) played on 15 May 2016. Source: apoelfc.com.cy
A = Away; H = Home; W = Win; D = Draw; L = Loss

=== Play-offs table ===
The first 12 of the 14 teams are divided into two groups of six teams. Points are carried over from the regular season.

==== Championship group ====
Pos	Team	Pld	W	D	L	GF	GA	GD	Pts	Qualification
1	APOEL (C)	36	26	5	5	91	26	+65	83	Qualification for the Champions League second qualifying round
2	AEK Larnaca	36	23	6	7	61	34	+27	75	Qualification for the Europa League first qualifying round
3	Apollon Limassol	36	19	11	6	61	36	+25	68	Qualification for the Europa League third qualifying round (Note: Apollon Limassol qualified for the Europa League third qualifying round by winning the 2015–16 Cypriot Cup.)
4	Omonia	36	20	7	9	63	34	+29	67	Qualification for the Europa League first qualifying round
5	Anorthosis Famagusta	36	16	11	9	57	41	+16	59	

Source: UEFA, CFA, Soccerway
Rules for classification: 1) Points; 2) Head-to-head points; 3) Head-to-head goal difference; 4) Head-to-head goals scored; 5) Head-to-head away goals scored (only if two teams); 6) Goal difference; 7) Goals scored; 8) Play-off (only if deciding champion or UEFA competitions).
(C) Champions

==== Matches ====
Kick-off times are in EET.

==== Regular season ====
22 August 2015 Matchweek 1	Ermis	1–5	APOEL	Ammochostos Stadium, Larnaca
20:00 EET	Vasilogiannis 55'	Report 1 Report 2	De Vincenti 9'; Leal 18', 32'; Štilić 26'; Charalambides 63'	Attendance: 1,051; Referee: Thomas Mouskos

30 August 2015 Matchweek 2	APOEL	6–2	Pafos	GSP Stadium, Nicosia
20:00 EET	Vinícius 33', 71'; De Vincenti 41'; Charalambides 61'; Cavenaghi 86', 90+1'	Report 1 Report 2	Damahou 39'; Grigalava 89'	Attendance: 6,656; Referee: Ioannis Anastasiou

12 September 2015 Matchweek 3	AEK	2–2	APOEL	GSZ Stadium, Larnaca
20:00 EET	Kanté 41'; Monteiro 75'	Report 1 Report 2	Vander 68'; Cavenaghi 82'	Attendance: 3,158; Referee: Vasilis Demetriou

21 September 2015 Matchweek 4	Doxa	0–1	APOEL	Makario Stadium, Nicosia
19:00 EET		Report 1 Report 2	Cavenaghi 13' (pen.)	Attendance: 1,606; Referee: Loukas Soteriou

26 September 2015 Matchweek 5	APOEL	4–0	Aris	GSP Stadium, Nicosia
20:00 EET	Cavenaghi 24' (pen.); Efrem 36'; De Vincenti 49', 88'	Report 1 Report 2		Attendance: 4,923; Referee: Kostas Psevdiotis

5 October 2015 Matchweek 6	Paralimni	0–5	APOEL	Tasos Markou Stadium, Paralimni
19:00 EET		Report 1 Report 2	De Vincenti 12'; Vander 31'; Efrem 51'; Cavenaghi 62' (pen.), 65'	Attendance: 979; Referee: Christos Nicolaides

17 October 2015 Matchweek 7	APOEL	6–0	AEL	GSP Stadium, Nicosia
18:00 EET	Efrem 14', 16'; Cavenaghi 37', 55', 90+1' (pen.); Artymatas 58'	Report 1 Report 2		Attendance: 7,178; Referee: Charalambos Skapoullis

26 October 2015 Matchweek 8	Nea Salamina	0–9	APOEL	Ammochostos Stadium, Larnaca
19:00 EET		Report 1 Report 2	Efrem 2'; Štilić 21'; Žarković 44' (o.g.); De Vincenti 45', 51'; Vinícius 61'; Cavenaghi 83', 89'; Piątkowski 86'	Attendance: 3,000; Referee: Avraam Tsoukkas

31 October 2015 Matchweek 9	APOEL	3–0	Ethnikos	GSP Stadium, Nicosia
19:00 EET	Charalambides 69'; De Vincenti 84'; Vinícius 90'	Report 1 Report 2		Attendance: 5,863; Referee: Costas Nicolaou

9 November 2015 Matchweek 10	Omonia	2–2	APOEL	GSP Stadium, Nicosia
19:00 EET	Margaça 2'; Sheridan 77' (pen.)	Report 1 Report 2	Cavenaghi 15', 52'	Attendance: 10,131; Referee: Demetris Masias

21 November 2015 Matchweek 11	APOEL	0–2	Anorthosis	GSP Stadium, Nicosia
19:00 EET		Report 1 Report 2	João Victor 69'; Ndlovu 81' (pen.)	Attendance: 9,712; Referee: Leontios Trattos

30 November 2015 Matchweek 12	Ayia Napa	0–1	APOEL	Tasos Markou Stadium, Paralimni
19:00 EET		Report 1 Report 2	Cavenaghi 29' (pen.)	Attendance: 401; Referee: Loukas Soteriou

5 December 2015 Matchweek 13	APOEL	0–1	Apollon	GSP Stadium, Nicosia
19:00 EET		Report 1 Report 2	Guié 58'	Attendance: 5,948; Referee: Vasilis Demetriou

14 December 2015 Matchweek 14	APOEL	2–0	Ermis	GSP Stadium, Nicosia
19:00 EET	Cavenaghi 64' (pen.); De Vincenti 82'	Report 1 Report 2		Attendance: 3,576; Referee: Kostas Psevdiotis

19 December 2015 Matchweek 15	Pafos	0–1	APOEL	Pafiako Stadium, Paphos
17:00 EET		Report 1 Report 2	Vander 14'	Attendance: 1,347; Referee: Charalambos Skapoullis

22 December 2015 Matchweek 16	APOEL	1–2	AEK	GSP Stadium, Nicosia
17:00 EET	João Guilherme 3'	Report 1 Report 2	Català 31'; Alves 72'	Attendance: 7,171; Referee: Christos Nicolaides

3 January 2016 Matchweek 17	APOEL	1–2	Doxa	GSP Stadium, Nicosia
18:00 EET	Sotiriou 68'	Report 1 Report 2	Edmar 10'; Paulinho 90+5' (pen.)	Attendance: 4,155; Referee: Vasilis Demetriou

10 January 2016 Matchweek 18	Aris	1–2	APOEL	Tsirion Stadium, Limassol
18:00 EET	Boniface 71'	Report 1 Report 2	De Vincenti 31'; Sotiriou 52'	Attendance: 1,742; Referee: Giorgos Nicolaou

17 January 2016 Matchweek 19	APOEL	3–0	Paralimni	GSP Stadium, Nicosia
18:00 EET	Morais 41'; Cavenaghi 45' (pen.); Gianniotas 63'	Report 1 Report 2		Attendance: 5,178; Referee: Loukas Soteriou

24 January 2016 Matchweek 20	AEL	0–1	APOEL	Tsirion Stadium, Limassol
15:00 EET		Report 1 Report 2	Morais 51'	Attendance: 4,990; Referee: Andreas Orthodoxou

30 January 2016 Matchweek 21	APOEL	6–1	Nea Salamina	GSP Stadium, Nicosia
18:00 EET	Sotiriou 7'; De Vincenti 64', 86'; Vander 70'; Vinícius 77'; Cavenaghi 83'	Report 1 Report 2	Makriev 14' (pen.); Gomes (yellow card) 73' (yellow-red card)	Attendance: 4,757; Referee: Avraam Tsoukkas

7 February 2016 Matchweek 22	Ethnikos	1–3	APOEL	Dasaki Stadium, Achna
18:00 EET	Elia 90'	Report 1 Report 2	Sotiriou 17', 42'; Cavenaghi 67' (pen.)	Attendance: 1,202; Referee: Kostas Psevdiotis

13 February 2016 Matchweek 23	APOEL	2–0	Omonia	GSP Stadium, Nicosia
15:00 EET	Efrem 9', 42'	Report 1 Report 2		Attendance: 11,391; Referee: Vasilis Demetriou

21 February 2016 Matchweek 24	Anorthosis	1–2	APOEL	Antonis Papadopoulos, Larnaca
16:00 EET	De Vincenti 24'; Sotiriou 32'	Report 1 Report 2	Ndlovu 55'; Nuhu (yellow card) 87' (yellow-red card)	Attendance: 4,868; Referee: Demetris Masias

27 February 2016 Matchweek 25	APOEL	3–0	Ayia Napa	GSP Stadium, Nicosia
18:00 EET	Efrem 12'; Vander 36'; Aloneftis 63'	Report 1 Report 2		Attendance: 4,907; Referee: Nicolas Athanasiou

2 March 2016 Matchweek 26	Apollon	0–1	APOEL	Tsirion Stadium, Limassol
16:00 EET		Report 1 Report 2	Efrem 6'	Attendance: 3,408; Referee: Christos Nicolaides

==== Play-offs ====
5 March 2016 Matchweek 1	Nea Salamina	0–1	APOEL	Ammochostos Stadium, Larnaca
18:00 EET		Report 1 Report 2	Carlão 40'	Attendance: 1,200; Referee: Charalambos Skapoullis

12 March 2016 Matchweek 2	APOEL	2–1	Omonia	GSP Stadium, Nicosia
18:00 EET	Efrem 42'; Vander 84'	Report 1 Report 2	Bebê 35'; Cristóvão (yellow card) 90+4' (yellow-red card)	Attendance: 9,670; Referee: Demetris Masias

20 March 2016 Matchweek 3	AEK	0–3	APOEL	GSZ Stadium, Larnaca
18:00 EET	Larena (yellow card) 55' (red card)	Report 1 Report 2	De Vincenti 8', (red card) 81'; Efrem 39'; Sotiriou 74'	Attendance: 3,972; Referee: Leontios Trattou

2 April 2016 Matchweek 4	APOEL	2–2	Apollon	GSP Stadium, Nicosia
18:00 EET	Carlão 24'; Merkis 90+5'	Report 1 Report 2	Maglica 22'; Alexandre 34'	Attendance: 8,498; Referee: Giorgos Nicolaou

9 April 2016 Matchweek 5	Anorthosis	1–1	APOEL	Antonis Papadopoulos, Larnaca
18:00 EET	Laifis 70'	Report 1 Report 2	Gianniotas 88'	Attendance: 4,001; Referee: Ioannis Anastasiou

16 April 2016 Matchweek 6	APOEL	4–1	Nea Salamina	GSP Stadium, Nicosia
18:00 EET	Štilić 22'; Sotiriou 39'; Morais 51' (pen.); Charalambides 64'	Report 1 Report 2	Adorno 72'	Attendance: 6,295; Referee: Loukas Soteriou

23 April 2016 Matchweek 7	Omonia	0–2	APOEL	GSP Stadium, Nicosia
18:00 EET		Report 1 Report 2	Gianniotas 23', 44'; De Vincenti (yellow card) 90+2' (yellow-red card)	Attendance: 12,272; Referee: Christos Nicolaides

28 April 2016 Matchweek 8	APOEL	2–0	AEK	GSP Stadium, Nicosia
16:00 EET	Sotiriou 41'; Gianniotas 65' (pen.)	Report 1 Report 2	Larena (yellow card) 68' (yellow-red card)	Attendance: 14,379; Referee: Vassilis Demetriou

7 May 2016 Matchweek 9	Apollon	1–0	APOEL	Tsirion Stadium, Limassol
19:00 EET	Stojanović 31'	Report 1 Report 2		Attendance: 1,798; Referee: Avraam Tsoukkas

15 May 2016 Matchweek 10	APOEL	2–2	Anorthosis	GSP Stadium, Nicosia
18:00 EET	Sotiriou 12'; De Vincenti 56'	Report 1 Report 2	Koulouris 44'; Makris 62'	Attendance: 12,252; Referee: Neophytos Neophytou

=== UEFA Champions League ===
==== Qualifying phase ====
===== Second qualifying round =====
14 July 2015 First Leg	APOEL (Cyprus)	0–0	(North Macedonia) FK Vardar	GSP Stadium, Nicosia
19:00 CET		Report 1 Report 2		Attendance: 14,531; Referee: (Azerbaijan) Aliyar Aghayev

21 July 2015 Second Leg	FK Vardar (North Macedonia)	1–1 (1–1 (a) agg.)	(Cyprus) APOEL	Philip II Arena, Skopje
20:00 CET	Ljamčevski 90+4'	Report 1 Report 2	De Vincenti 60'	Attendance: 22,540; Referee: (Italy) Davide Massa

===== Third qualifying round =====
28 July 2015 First Leg	Midtjylland (Denmark)	1–2	(Cyprus) APOEL	MCH Arena, Herning
19:00 CET	Poulsen 88'	Report 1 Report 2	Hansen 30' (o.g.); De Vincenti 33'	Attendance: 8,253; Referee: (Slovenia) Slavko Vinčić

4 August 2015 Second Leg	APOEL (Cyprus)	0–1 (2–2 (a) agg.)	(Denmark) Midtjylland	GSP Stadium, Nicosia
19:00 CET	Vinícius (red card) 30'	Report 1 Report 2	Sviatchenko 3'	Attendance: 16,070; Referee: (Scotland) Bobby Madden

===== Play-off round =====
18 August 2015 First leg	FC Astana (Kazakhstan)	1–0	(Cyprus) APOEL	Astana Arena, Astana
18:00 CET	Dzholchiev 13'	Report 1 Report 2		Attendance: 30,000; Referee: (Hungary) Viktor Kassai

26 August 2015 Second Leg	APOEL (Cyprus)	1–1 (1–2 agg.)	(Kazakhstan) FC Astana	GSP Stadium, Nicosia
20:45 CET	Štilić 60'	Report 1 Report 2	Maksimović 84'	Attendance: 17,699; Referee: (England) Martin Atkinson

=== UEFA Europa League ===
==== Group stage ====
Pos	Team	Pld	W	D	L	GF	GA	GD	Pts	Qualification	SCH	SPP	AT	APO
1	(Germany) Schalke 04	6	4	2	0	15	3	+12	14	Advance to knockout phase	—	2–2	4–0	1–0
2	(Czech Republic) Sparta Prague	6	3	3	0	10	5	+5	12	Advance to knockout phase	1–1	—	1–0	2–0
3	(Greece) Asteras Tripolis	6	1	1	4	4	12	−8	4		0–4	1–1	—	2–0
4	(Cyprus) APOEL	6	1	0	5	3	12	−9	3		0–3	1–3	2–1	—

Source: Soccerway
Rules for classification: Group stage tiebreakers

===== Matches =====
17 September 2015 Matchweek 1	APOEL (Cyprus)	0–3	(Germany) Schalke 04	GSP Stadium, Nicosia
21:05 CET	De Vincenti (red card) 77'	Report 1 Report 2	Matip 28'; Huntelaar 35', 71'	Attendance: 13,512; Referee: (France) Tony Chapron

1 October 2015 Matchweek 2	Sparta Prague (Czech Republic)	2–0	(Cyprus) APOEL	Generali Arena, Prague
19:00 CET	Fatai 24'; Brabec 60'	Report 1 Report 2		Attendance: 9,130; Referee: (Poland) Paweł Gil

22 October 2015 Matchweek 3	APOEL (Cyprus)	2–1	(Greece) Asteras Tripoli	GSP Stadium, Nicosia
19:00 CET	Cavenaghi 45+9' (pen.); Carlão 59'	Report 1 Report 2	Lluy 8'	Attendance: 12,783; Referee: (Russia) Aleksei Eskov

5 November 2015 Matchweek 4	Asteras Tripoli (Greece)	2–0	(Cyprus) APOEL	Theodoros Kolokotronis, Tripoli
21:05 CET	Bertoglio 2'; Giannou 45+1'	Report 1 Report 2		Attendance: 3,624; Referee: (Austria) Oliver Drachta

26 November 2015 Matchweek 5	Schalke 04 (Germany)	1–0	(Cyprus) APOEL	Veltins-Arena, Gelsenkirchen
19:00 CET	Choupo-Moting 86'	Report 1 Report 2		Attendance: 43,117; Referee: (Sweden) Andreas Ekberg

10 December 2015 Matchweek 6	APOEL (Cyprus)	1–3	(Czech Republic) Sparta Prague	GSP Stadium, Nicosia
21:05 CET	Cavenaghi 6'	Report 1 Report 2	Juliš 63'; Lafata 77', 87'	Attendance: 5,976; Referee: (Hungary) István Vad

=== Cypriot Super Cup ===
12 August 2015 Final	APOEL	0–0 (3–4 p)	AEL	GSP Stadium, Nicosia
20:00 EET		Report 1 Report 2		Attendance: 4,352; Referee: Christos Nicolaides
	Penalties
	Morais (penalty scored); Leal (penalty scored); Antoniades (penalty missed); Efrem (penalty missed); De Vincenti (penalty scored)		Tagbajumi (penalty scored); Sambou (penalty scored); Sielis (penalty scored); Feltscher (penalty missed); Nicolaou (penalty scored)

=== Cypriot Cup ===
==== Second round ====
13 January 2016 First leg	Nea Salamina	0–1	APOEL	Ammochostos Stadium, Larnaca
19:00 EET		Report 1 Report 2	Morais 61'	Attendance: 2,000; Referee: Costas Nicolaou

27 January 2016 Second Leg	APOEL	3–2 (4–2 agg.)	Nea Salamina	GSP Stadium, Nicosia
17:00 EET	Cavenaghi 9'; De Vincenti 36'; Vinícius 50'	Report 1 Report 2	Ćurjurić 74' (pen.); Liliu 76'	Attendance: 2,734; Referee: Demetris Masias

==== Quarter-finals ====
10 February 2016 First leg	APOEL	1–1	Aris	GSP Stadium, Nicosia
17:00 EET	Cavenaghi 18' (pen.)	Report 1 Report 2	Randy 15'	Attendance: 3,344; Referee: Charalambos Skapoullis

17 February 2016 Second Leg	Aris	1–3 (2–4 agg.)	APOEL	Tsirion Stadium, Limassol
16:00 EET	Maragoudakis 63'	Report 1 Report 2	Efrem 49'; De Vincenti 77'; Aloneftis 81'	Attendance: 1,000; Referee: Christos Nicolaides

==== Semi-finals ====
6 April 2016 First leg	APOEL	1–1	Apollon	GSP Stadium, Nicosia
17:00 EET	Sotiriou 29'; Merkis (red card) 90'	Report 1 Report 2	Gneki Guié 21'	Attendance: 6,533; Referee: Vasilis Demetriou

20 April 2016 Second Leg	Apollon	1–1 (a.e.t.) (2–2 agg.) (5–4 p)	APOEL	Tsirion Stadium, Limassol
17:00 EET	Da Silva 45'	Report 1 Report 2	Efrem 45+2'; Vinícius (red card) 95'	Attendance: 4,992; Referee: Leontios Trattou
	Penalties
	Da Silva (penalty scored); Papoulis (penalty scored); Thuram (penalty scored); Slavchev (penalty scored); Mezga (penalty scored)		Morais (penalty scored); Sotiriou (penalty scored); Efrem (penalty scored); Gianniotas (penalty scored); Astiz (penalty missed)
