= 2015–16 Cypriot Cup =

Tournament details
- Country: Cyprus
- Dates: 28 October 2015 – 18 May 2016
- Teams: 28

Final positions
- Champions: Apollon (8th title)
- Runners-up: Omonia

Tournament statistics
- Matches played: 41
- Goals scored: 130 (3.17 per match)
- Top goal scorer(s): Efthimis Koulouris (7 goals)
- All statistics correct as of 18 May 2016.

The 2015–16 Cypriot Cup was the 74th edition of the Cypriot Cup. A total of 28 clubs entered the competition. It began on 28 October 2015 with the first round and concluded on 18 May 2016 with the final which was held at Tsirion Stadium. Apollon clinched their 8th Cypriot Cup trophy after a 2–1 victory over Omonia.

== First round ==
The first round draw took place on 19 October 2015 and the matches played on 28 October, 4 November and 2 December 2015.

| 28 October 2015 | AEZ Zakakiou | 0−3 | Ethnikos Achna | Akrotiri Community Stadium, Akrotiri |
| 14:00 EET | | | Cojocnean 29', 47'; Chadjivasilis 76' | Attendance: 150; Referee: Andreas Constantinou |

| 28 October 2015 | THOI Lakatamia | 1−6 | Apollon Limassol | Makario Stadium, Nicosia |
| 14:00 EET | Ioannou 63' | | Farley 17', 54'; Gneki Guié 25' (pen.); Mezga 32'; Slavchev 83'; Stojanović 90+1' | Attendance: 109; Referee: Georgios Constantinou |

| 28 October 2015 | Ayia Napa | 5−1 | Karmiotissa Polemidion | Tasos Markou Stadium, Paralimni |
| 14:00 EET | Mguni 34', 53'; Katsis 44'; Markou 57'; Antolek 85' | | Kyrpou 80' | Attendance: 100; Referee: Chrysovalantis Theouli |

| 28 October 2015 | ENAD Polis Chrysochous | 0−2 | Aris Limassol | Pafiako Stadium, Paphos |
| 14:00 EET | | | Kyriacou 13'; Boniface 27' | Attendance: 100; Referee: Timotheos Christofi |

| 28 October 2015 | ASIL Lysi | 4−3 (a.e.t.) | Doxa Katokopias | Ammochostos Stadium, Larnaca |
| 14:00 EET | Mihajlović 44'; Choutris 72'; Nicolaou 83'; Chirouf 95' | | Konstantinou 28', 41', 49' (pen.) | Attendance: 80; Referee: Ioannis Kattou |

| 28 October 2015 | Anagennisi Deryneia | 1−1 (a.e.t.) (3–2 p) | Digenis Voroklinis | Anagennisi Stadium, Deryneia |
| 14:00 EET | Oppong 19' | | Freddy 26' | Attendance: 200; Referee: Panayiotis Rodosthenous |
| | Penalties |
| | Solomou (penalty scored); Therapontos (penalty scored); Sotiriou (penalty missed); Diallo (penalty scored) | | Martis (penalty missed); Papasavva (penalty scored); Agbo (penalty scored); Nicolaides (penalty missed); Valter (penalty missed) |

| 28 October 2015 | Nicos & Socratis Erimis | 2−1 (Note: The match was abandoned after 68 minutes due to bad weather conditions and resumed on 4 November 2015, 14:30 (EET), from the point of abandonment.) | Othellos Athienou | Erimi Community Stadium, Erimi |
| 14:00 EET | Demetriou 58'; Mavrakis 61' | | Alkiviades 82' | Referee: Kyriacos Christodoulou |

| 28 October 2015 | Omonia | 2−0 | PAEEK | GSP Stadium, Nicosia |
| 17:00 EET | Sheridan 17'; Kirm 90+1' | | | Attendance: 2,000; Referee: Nicolas Neocleous |

| 28 October 2015 | Anorthosis | 9−0 | Elpida Xylofagou | Antonis Papadopoulos, Larnaca |
| 17:00 EET | Avraam 13', 31'; Koulouris 21' (pen.), 25', 51', 73', 76', 87'; Calvo 80' | | | Attendance: 1,000; Referee: Neophytos Neophytou |

| 4 November 2015 | Enosis Neon Paralimni | 0−1 | Olympiakos Nicosia | Tasos Markou Stadium, Paralimni |
| 14:00 EET | | | Papadopoulos 45+2' (o.g.) | Referee: Marios Antoniou |

| 4 November 2015 | Enosis Neon Parekklisia | 1−5 | Ermis Aradippou | Akrotiri Community Stadium, Akrotiri |
| 14:00 EET | Neophytou 73' | | Ouattara 21'; Latorre 40', 52'; Vasilogiannis 56'; Misidjan 71' | Referee: Constantinos Photiou |

| 2 December 2015 | Omonia Aradippou | 0−3 | Nea Salamina | Antonis Papadopoulos, Larnaca |
| 17:00 EET | | | Adorno 3' (pen.), 12', 27' | Attendance: 300; Referee: Savvas Zafiris |

== Second round ==
The second round draw took place on 21 December 2015 and the matches played on 6, 13, 20, 26 and 27 January 2016.

The following four teams advanced directly to second round and will meet the twelve winners of the first round ties:

- APOEL (2014–15 Cypriot Cup winner)
- AEL Limassol (2014–15 Cypriot Cup runners-up)
- AEK Larnaca (2014–15 Cypriot First Division Fair Play winner)
- Pafos FC (2014–15 Cypriot Second Division Fair Play winner)

| Team 1 | Agg. | Team 2 | 1st leg | 2nd leg |
|---|---|---|---|---|
| AEK Larnaca | 13–1 | Nicos & Socratis Erimis | 5–0 | 8–1 |
| Aris Limassol | 4–1 | Olympiakos Nicosia | 1–0 | 3–1 |
| Apollon Limassol | 4–1 | Ermis Aradippou | 3–1 | 1–0 |
| Anorthosis | 2–1 | Anagennisi Deryneia | 2–1 | 0–0 |
| Pafos FC | 5–0 | ASIL Lysi | 3–0 | 2–0 |
| Nea Salamina | 2–4 | APOEL | 0–1 | 2–3 |
| AEL Limassol | 3–1 | Ayia Napa | 1–0 | 2–1 |
| Omonia | 5–1 | Ethnikos Achna | 2–0 | 3–1 |

=== First leg ===
| 6 January 2016 | AEK Larnaca | 5−0 | Nicos & Socratis Erimis | GSZ Stadium, Larnaca |
| 15:00 EET | Kyprianou 20'; Monteiro 23', 53'; Català 67'; Kanté 84' | Report | | Attendance: 300; Referee: Christos Constantinou |

| 6 January 2016 | Pafos FC | 3−0 | ASIL Lysi | Pafiako Stadium, Pafos |
| 15:00 EET | Maachi 5', 23'; Sielis 38' | Report | | Attendance: 150; Referee: Iakovos Tokkari |

| 6 January 2016 | Aris Limassol | 1−0 | Olympiakos Nicosia | Tsirion Stadium, Limassol |
| 16:00 EET | Kyprou 13' | Report | | Attendance: 213; Referee: Christos N. Christou |

| 6 January 2016 | Omonia | 2−0 | Ethnikos Achna | GSP Stadium, Nicosia |
| 16:00 EET | Iacob 51' (o.g.); Margaça 55' | Report | | Attendance: 4,646; Referee: Andreas Orthodoxou |

| 6 January 2016 | Anorthosis | 2−1 | Anagennisi Deryneia | Antonis Papadopoulos, Larnaca |
| 18:00 EET | Koulouris 17'; Ndlovu 84' (pen.) | Report | Koutouna 66' | Attendance: 1,300; Referee: Kyriacos V. Kyriacou |

| 13 January 2016 | AEL Limassol | 1−0 | Ayia Napa | Tsirion Stadium, Limassol |
| 17:00 EET | Felgate 70' (o.g.) | Report | | Attendance: 679; Referee: Christos Elia |

| 13 January 2016 | Nea Salamina | 0−1 | APOEL | Ammochostos Stadium, Larnaca |
| 19:00 EET | | Report | Morais 61' | Attendance: 2,000; Referee: Costas Nicolaou |

| 20 January 2016 | Apollon Limassol | 3−1 | Ermis Aradippou | Tsirion Stadium, Limassol |
| 16:00 EET | Maglica 24'; Kolokoudias 64' (pen.); Thuram 90' | Report | Dickson 76' | Attendance: 1,062; Referee: Costas Psevdiotis |

=== Second leg ===
| 13 January 2016 | Nicos & Socratis Erimis | 1−8 (1–13 agg.) | AEK Larnaca | Pafiako Stadium, Pafos |
| 15:00 EET | Niokka 70' | Report | Mitidis 19', 32', 81'; Farley 23'; Mintikkis 38'; Tomàs 51' (pen.); Boljević 58' (pen.); Kyprianou 90' | Attendance: 50; Referee: Savvas Zafiris |

| 13 January 2016 | Olympiakos Nicosia | 1−3 (1–4 agg.) | Aris Limassol | Makario Stadium, Nicosia |
| 15:00 EET | Nearchou 89' | Report | González 35' (pen.), 78'; Kyprou 82' | Attendance: 58; Referee: Rovertos Costa |

| 20 January 2016 | Anagennisi Deryneia | 0−0 (1–2 agg.) | Anorthosis | Ammochostos Stadium, Larnaca |
| 15:00 EET | | Report | | Attendance: 800; Referee: Nicolas St. Nicolaou |

| 20 January 2016 | Ayia Napa | 1−2 (1–3 agg.) | AEL Limassol | Tasos Markou Stadium, Paralimni |
| 17:00 EET | Andreou 64' | Report | Coutadeur 16'; Sardinero 58' | Attendance: 150; Referee: Neophytos Neophytou |

| 20 January 2016 | Ethnikos Achna | 1−3 (1–5 agg.) | Omonia | Dasaki Stadium, Achna |
| 19:00 EET | Poutziouris 45' | Report | Assis 18'; Roushias 70', 88' | Attendance: 800; Referee: Thomas Mouskos |

| 26 January 2016 | ASIL Lysi | 0−2 (0–5 agg.) | Pafos FC | Ammochostos Stadium, Larnaca |
| 15:00 EET | | Report | Alba 41'; Bodiong 70' | Attendance: 19; Referee: Andreas M. Argyrou |

| 27 January 2016 | APOEL | 3−2 (4–2 agg.) | Nea Salamina | GSP Stadium, Nicosia |
| 17:00 EET | Cavenaghi 9'; De Vincenti 36'; Vinícius 50' | Report | Ćurjurić 74' (pen.); Liliu 76' | Attendance: 2,734; Referee: Demetris Masias |

| 27 January 2016 | Ermis Aradippou | 0−1 (1–4 agg.) | Apollon Limassol | Ammochostos Stadium, Larnaca |
| 19:00 EET | | Report | Alexandre 61' | Attendance: 139; Referee: Avraam Tsoukkas |

== Quarter-finals ==
The quarter-finals draw took place on 28 January 2016 and the matches played on 3, 10, 17 and 24 February 2016.

| Team 1 | Agg. | Team 2 | 1st leg | 2nd leg |
|---|---|---|---|---|
| Omonia | 8–0 | Pafos FC | 4–0 | 4–0 |
| Apollon Limassol | 3–0 | AEL Limassol | 2–0 | 1–0 |
| APOEL | 4–1 | Aris Limassol | 1–1 | 3–1 |
| AEK Larnaca | 5–2 | Anorthosis | 3–0 | 2–2 |

=== First leg ===
| 3 February 2016 | AEK Larnaca | 3−0 | Anorthosis | GSZ Stadium, Larnaca |
| 16:00 EET | Tomàs 30'; Boljević 45+2'; Mitidis 51' | Report | | Attendance: 3,000; Referee: Christos Nicolaides |

| 3 February 2016 | Omonia | 4−0 | Pafos FC | GSP Stadium, Nicosia |
| 17:00 EET | Schembri 26'; Badibanga 29', 64'; Christofi 79' | Report | | Attendance: 3,529; Referee: Giorgos Nicolaou |

| 10 February 2016 | Apollon Limassol | 2−0 | AEL Limassol | Tsirion Stadium, Limassol |
| 16:00 EET | Gneki Guié 81'; Slavchev 83' | Report | | Attendance: 5,516; Referee: Ioannis Anastasiou |

| 10 February 2016 | APOEL | 1−1 | Aris Limassol | GSP Stadium, Nicosia |
| 17:00 EET | Cavenaghi 18' (pen.) | Report | Randy 15' | Attendance: 3,344; Referee: Charalambos Skapoullis |

=== Second leg ===
| 17 February 2016 | Anorthosis | 2−2 (2–5 agg.) | AEK Larnaca | Antonis Papadopoulos, Larnaca |
| 16:00 EET | Makris 55', 76' | Report | Tričkovski 26' (pen.); Mitidis 34' | Attendance: 1,500; Referee: Leontios Trattou |

| 17 February 2016 | Aris Limassol | 1−3 (2–4 agg.) | APOEL | Tsirion Stadium, Limassol |
| 16:00 EET | Maragoudakis 63' | Report | Efrem 49'; De Vincenti 77'; Aloneftis 81' | Attendance: 1,000; Referee: Christos Nicolaides |

| 17 February 2016 | Pafos FC | 0−4 (0–8 agg.) | Omonia | Pafiako Stadium, Pafos |
| 17:00 EET | | Report | Kasmi 40'; Okeuhie 42'; Hafez 64'; Kirm 68' | Attendance: 300; Referee: Avraam Tsoukkas |

| 24 February 2016 | AEL Limassol | 0–1 (0–3 agg.) | Apollon Limassol | Tsirion Stadium, Limassol |
| 16:00 EET | | Report | Wheeler 90+3' | Attendance: 3,725; Referee: Vasilis Demetriou |

== Semi-finals ==
The semi-finals draw took place on 3 March 2016 and the matches played on 6 and 20 April 2016.

| Team 1 | Agg. | Team 2 | 1st leg | 2nd leg |
|---|---|---|---|---|
| APOEL | 2–2 (4–5 p) | Apollon Limassol | 1–1 | 1–1 (a.e.t.) |
| AEK Larnaca | 0–0 (3–5 p) | Omonia | 0–0 | 0–0 (a.e.t.) |

=== First leg ===
| 6 April 2016 | APOEL | 1−1 | Apollon Limassol | GSP Stadium, Nicosia |
| 17:00 EET | Sotiriou 29' | Report | Gneki Guié 21' | Attendance: 6,533; Referee: Vasilis Demetriou |

| 6 April 2016 | AEK Larnaca | 0−0 | Omonia | GSZ Stadium, Larnaca |
| 19:00 EET | | Report | | Attendance: 3,584; Referee: Christos Nicolaides |

=== Second leg ===
| 20 April 2016 | Apollon Limassol | 1−1 (a.e.t.) (2–2 agg.) (5–4 p) | APOEL | Tsirion Stadium, Limassol |
| 17:00 EET | Alexandre 45' | Report | Efrem 45+2' | Attendance: 4,992; Referee: Leontios Trattou |
| | Penalties |
| | Alexandre (penalty scored); Papoulis (penalty scored); Thuram (penalty scored); Slavchev (penalty scored); Mezga (penalty scored) | | Morais (penalty scored); Sotiriou (penalty scored); Efrem (penalty scored); Gianniotas (penalty scored); Astiz (penalty missed) |

| 20 April 2016 | Omonia | 0−0 (a.e.t.) (0–0 agg.) (5–3 p) | AEK Larnaca | GSP Stadium, Nicosia |
| 19:00 EET | | Report | | Attendance: 13,068; Referee: Demetris Masias |
| | Penalties |
| | Sheridan (penalty scored); Hafez (penalty scored); Runje (penalty scored); Badibanga (penalty scored); Schembri (penalty scored) | | Boljević (penalty missed); Alves (penalty scored); Tomàs (penalty scored); Ninu (penalty scored) |

== Final ==
18 May 2016
18:30 EEST

| Apollon Limassol | 2–1 | Omonia |
|---|---|---|
| Papoulis 5'; Angeli 72' | Report | Margaça 51' |

Tsirion Stadium, Limassol
Attendance: 12,076
Referee: (Croatia) Ante Vučemilović-Šimunović

| Apollon | Omonia |

Cypriot Cup 2015–16 Winners
Apollon Limassol
8th Title

== See also ==
- 2015–16 Cypriot First Division
- 2015–16 Cypriot Second Division
