= Boy Waterman =

Dutch footballer

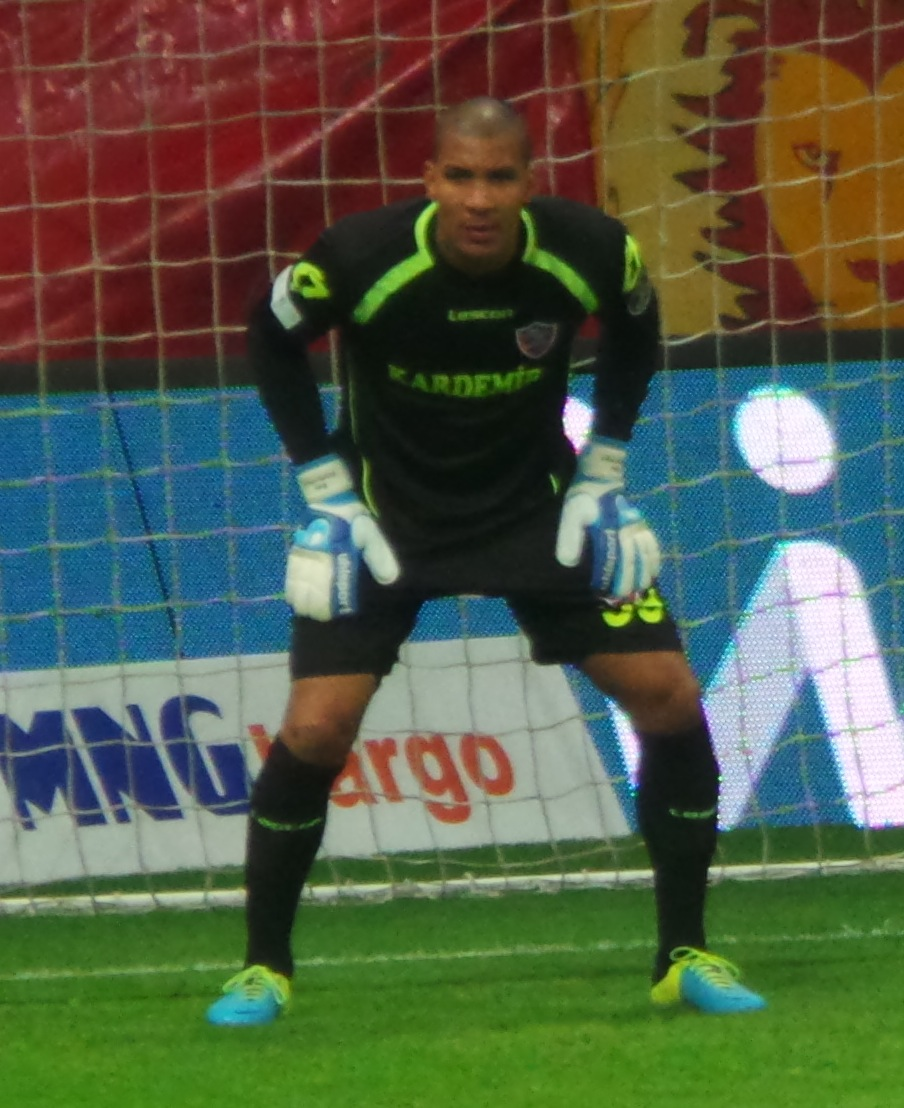
- Waterman playing for Karabükspor in 2013

Personal information
- Date of birth: 24 January 1984 (age 42)
- Place of birth: Lelystad, Netherlands
- Height: 1.88 m (6 ft 2 in)
- Position: Goalkeeper

Youth career
- SV Lelystad '67
- Ajax

Senior career*
| Years | Team | Apps | (Gls) |
| 2001–2007 | Heerenveen | 17 | (0) |
| 2007 | → AZ (loan) | 11 | (0) |
| 2007–2011 | AZ | 22 | (0) |
| 2008–2010 | → ADO Den Haag (loan) | 10 | (0) |
| 2010–2011 | → De Graafschap (loan) | 33 | (0) |
| 2011–2012 | Alemannia Aachen | 30 | (0) |
| 2012–2013 | PSV | 29 | (0) |
| 2013–2015 | Karabükspor | 55 | (0) |
| 2015–2020 | APOEL | 82 | (0) |
| 2020–2022 | OFI | 30 | (0) |
| 2022–2024 | PSV | 1 | (0) |

International career
| 2003–2004 | Netherlands U19 | 6 | (0) |
| 2005–2007 | Netherlands U21 | 13 | (0) |
Medal record
Men's football
Representing Netherlands
UEFA European Under-21 Championship
| Winner | 2007 Netherlands |
- * Club domestic league appearances and goals

Boy Waterman (born 24 January 1984) is a Dutch former professional footballer who played as a goalkeeper.

He was part of the Netherlands under-21 national team which won the 2007 Under-21 European Football Championship.

== Club career ==
Waterman started his career at SC Heerenveen, debuting in 2004. After being loaned to AZ Alkmaar for half a year he completed a transfer in April 2007. On 10 February 2007, Waterman played his first Eredivisie match for AZ against Willem II. He made his European debut in AZ's 3–3 draw against Fenerbahçe (UEFA Cup) on 14 February 2007. Going into the final day of the 2006–07 Eredivisie season AZ were top of the league, however Waterman received a red card in a 3–2 loss to Excelsior which handed the title to PSV Eindhoven.

In August 2008, he was given by AZ Alkmaar on loan to ADO Den Haag. On 22 February 2010, he joined Viking FK on loan until August. However, the loan deal was cancelled because of a groin injury. After that period Waterman played for De Graafschap, again on loan from AZ Alkmaar.

In July 2011, he joined German club Alemannia Aachen, appearing in 30 competitive matches with the club. After Aachen was eventually relegated, he left on a free transfer to PSV Eindhoven. Waterman began the 2012–13 season as PSV's second-choice goalkeeper, behind Przemysław Tytoń. However, after five league games, Waterman was promoted to first-choice goalkeeper by manager Dick Advocaat.

On 9 July 2015, Waterman signed a two-year contract with Cypriot club APOEL FC. He made his APOEL debut on 14 July 2015, in his team's 0–0 home draw against FK Vardar for the second qualifying round of the UEFA Champions League. At the end of the season he crowned champion for the first time in his career, as APOEL managed to win the Cypriot First Division title for a fourth time in the row. On 15 May 2017, Waterman signed a two-year contract extension with APOEL, running until June 2019.

On 24 August 2020, he joined OFI on a free transfer.

== International career ==
Born in the Netherlands, Waterman is of Surinamese descent. In 2007 Waterman was called up by Jong Oranje coach Foppe de Haan to be part of his squad for the 2007 UEFA European Under-21 Football Championship held in the Netherlands. Waterman was De Haan's first goalkeeper for the tournament and helped his team in their first match against Israel to a 1–0 victory. He also started in their second match against Portugal but was substituted by Kenneth Vermeer in the first half with a back injury. The match against Portugal was eventually won and the Dutch managed to qualify for the semi-finals of the tournament as well as for the 2008 Summer Olympics. In the semi-finals Waterman returned on the pitch and The Netherlands eliminated England after a 1–1 draw with 13–12 in a penalty shootout with 32 penalty kicks taken, with Waterman stopping three English penalties and scoring one himself. The Dutch went on to retain their 2006 title by beating Serbia 4–1 in the final.

== Career statistics ==
As of match played 19 May 2024

Appearances and goals by club, season and competition
| Club | Season | League | | | National cup (Note: Includes KNVB Cup, DFB-Pokal, Cypriot Cup, Greek Football Cup) | | Continental | | Other | | Total | |
| Club | Season | Division | Apps | Goals | Apps | Goals | Apps | Goals | Apps | Goals | Apps | Goals |
|---|---|---|---|---|---|---|---|---|---|---|---|---|
| Heerenveen | 2003–04 | Eredivisie | 1 | 0 | 0 | 0 | 0 | 0 | — | | 1 | 0 |
| Heerenveen | 2004–05 | Eredivisie | 5 | 0 | 0 | 0 | 0 | 0 | — | | 5 | 0 |
| Heerenveen | 2005–06 | Eredivisie | 11 | 0 | 0 | 0 | 4 (Note: Appearances in UEFA Cup) | 0 | — | | 15 | 0 |
| Heerenveen | Total | | 17 | 0 | 0 | 0 | 4 | 0 | — | | 21 | 0 |
| AZ | 2006–07 | Eredivisie | 11 | 0 | 0 | 0 | 6 | 0 | — | | 17 | 0 |
| AZ | 2007–08 | Eredivisie | 23 | 0 | 1 | 0 | 6 | 0 | — | | 30 | 0 |
| AZ | Total | | 34 | 0 | 1 | 0 | 12 | 0 | — | | 47 | 0 |
| ADO Den Haag | 2008–09 | Eredivisie | 10 | 0 | 3 | 0 | — | | — | | 13 | 0 |
| ADO Den Haag | 2009–10 | Eredivisie | 0 | 0 | 0 | 0 | — | | — | | 0 | 0 |
| ADO Den Haag | Total | | 10 | 0 | 3 | 0 | — | | — | | 13 | 0 |
| De Graafschap | 2010–11 | Eredivisie | 33 | 0 | 1 | 0 | — | | — | | 34 | 0 |
| Alemannia Aachen | 2011–12 | 2. Bundesliga | 30 | 0 | 1 | 0 | — | | — | | 31 | 0 |
| PSV | 2012–13 | Eredivisie | 29 | 0 | 5 | 0 | 7 (Note: Appearance(s) in UEFA Europa League) | 0 | 0 | 0 | 41 | 0 |
| Karabükspor | 2013–14 | Süper Lig | 34 | 0 | 0 | 0 | — | | — | | 34 | 0 |
| Karabükspor | 2014–15 | Süper Lig | 21 | 0 | 0 | 0 | 4 | 0 | — | | 25 | 0 |
| Karabükspor | Total | | 55 | 0 | 0 | 0 | 4 | 0 | — | | 59 | 0 |
| APOEL | 2015–16 | Cypriot First Division | 20 | 0 | 1 | 0 | 12 (Note: Six appearances in UEFA Champions League, six appearances in UEFA Europa League) | 0 | 1 (Note: Appearance in Cypriot Super Cup) | 0 | 34 | 0 |
| APOEL | 2016–17 | Cypriot First Division | 34 | 0 | 1 | 0 | 16 (Note: Six appearances in UEFA Champions League, ten appearances in UEFA Europa League) | 0 | 0 | 0 | 51 | 0 |
| APOEL | 2017–18 | Cypriot First Division | 5 | 0 | 0 | 0 | 9 (Note: Appearances in UEFA Champions League) | 0 | 0 | 0 | 13 | 0 |
| APOEL | 2018–19 | Cypriot First Division | 21 | 0 | 2 | 0 | 8 (Note: Two appearances in UEFA Champions League, six appearances in UEFA Europa League) | 0 | 1 | 0 | 32 | 0 |
| APOEL | 2019–20 | Cypriot First Division | 2 | 0 | 2 | 0 | 1 | 0 | 1 | 0 | 6 | 0 |
| APOEL | Total | | 82 | 0 | 6 | 0 | 46 | 0 | 3 | 0 | 137 | 0 |
| OFI | 2020–21 | Super League Greece | 22 | 0 | 0 | 0 | 1 | 0 | — | | 23 | 0 |
| OFI | 2021–22 | Super League Greece | 8 | 0 | 3 | 0 | — | | — | | 11 | 0 |
| OFI | Total | | 30 | 0 | 3 | 0 | 1 | 0 | — | | 34 | 0 |
| PSV | 2022–23 | Eredivisie | 0 | 0 | 0 | 0 | 0 | 0 | 0 | 0 | 0 | 0 |
| PSV | 2023–24 | Eredivisie | 1 | 0 | 0 | 0 | 0 | 0 | 0 | 0 | 1 | 0 |
| PSV | Total | | 1 | 0 | 0 | 0 | 0 | 0 | 0 | 0 | 1 | 0 |
| Career total | | | 321 | 0 | 20 | 0 | 74 | 0 | 3 | 0 | 418 | 0 |

== Honours ==
PSV

- KNVB Cup: 2022–23
- Johan Cruyff Shield: 2012, 2022, 2023

APOEL

- Cypriot First Division: 2015–16, 2016–17, 2017–18, 2018–19
- Cypriot Super Cup: 2019

Netherlands U21

- UEFA European Under-21 Championship: 2007
