= Marios Nicolaou (footballer, born 1983) =

Cypriot footballer and coach (born 1983)

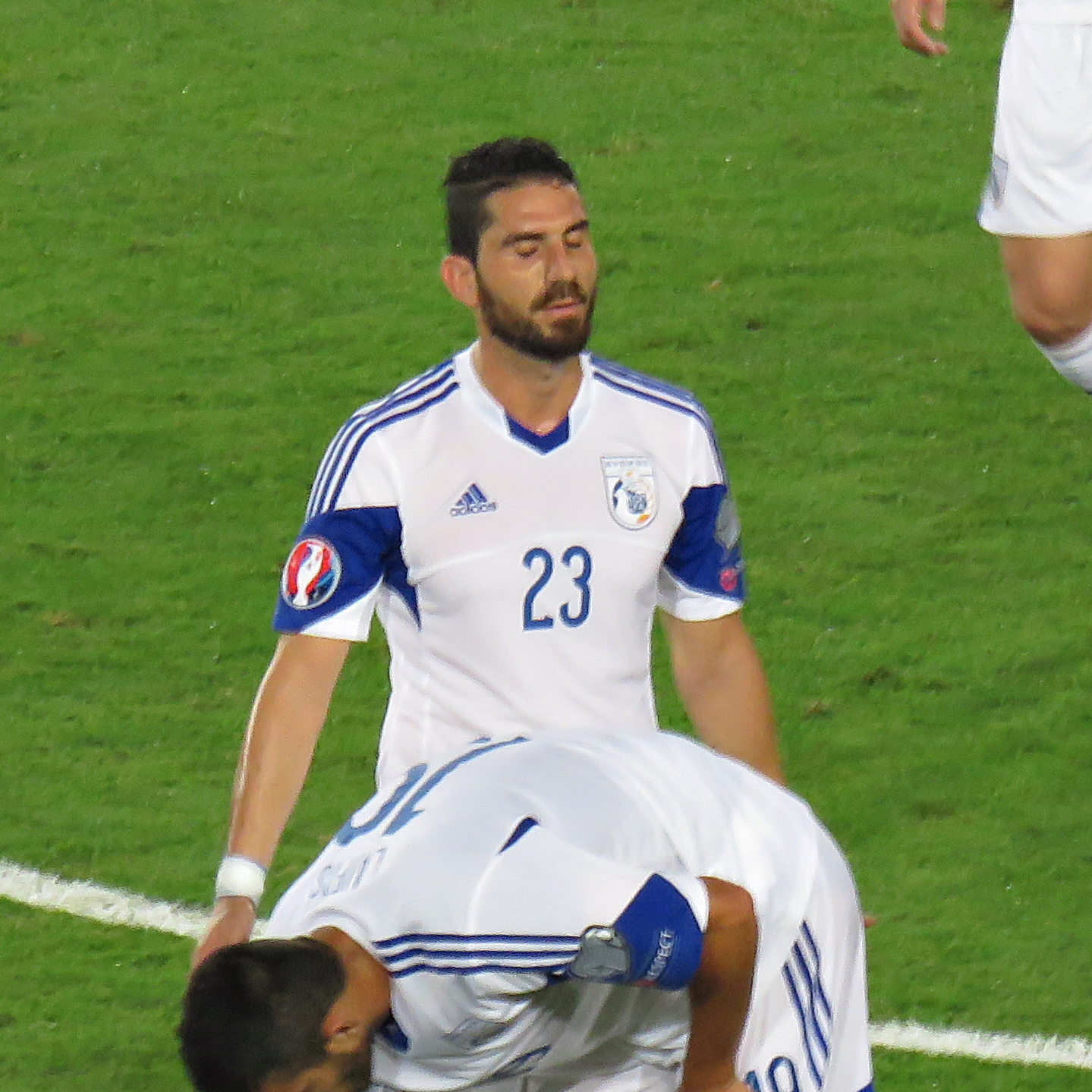

Personal information
- Date of birth: 4 October 1983 (age 43)
- Place of birth: Limassol, Cyprus
- Height: 1.77 m (5 ft 10 in)
- Position: Defensive midfielder

Senior career*
Years	Team	Apps	(Gls)
1998–2002	Aris Limassol	59	(8)
2002–2004	AC Omonia	8	(0)
2004–2007	Aris Limassol	62	(10)
2007–2010	Panionios	71	(1)
2010–2015	AEL Limassol	129	(6)
2015–2016	Levadiakos	15	(0)
2016	Inter Turku	7	(0)
2016–2018	AEL Limassol	43	(1)

International career
2003–2017	Cyprus	54	(0)

Managerial career
- 2020–2022: Omonia U19
- 2022–2025: Omonia (assistant)
- 2025: AEL Limassol (caretaker)
- * Club domestic league appearances and goals

Marios Nicolaou (Greek: Μάριος Νικολάου; born 4 October 1983) is a retired Cypriot footballer and manager.
