= Braian Lluy =

Argentine footballer (born 1989)

Personal information
- Full name: Braian Emanuel Lluy
- Date of birth: April 25, 1989 (age 37)
- Place of birth: Pergamino, Argentina
- Height: 1.69 m (5 ft 7 in)
- Position: Right-back

Team information
- Current team: Douglas Haig

Youth career
- Racing Club

Senior career*
Years	Team	Apps	(Gls)
2009–2013	Racing Club	64	(1)
2013–2016	Asteras Tripolis	84	(1)
2017–2019	Quilmes	37	(2)
2019–2020	Boca Unidos	13	(0)
2020–2021	Platense	13	(0)
2021–2022	Panetolikos	26	(0)
2022–2023	Apollon Smyrnis	24	(0)
2024–	Douglas Haig	10	(0)
- * Club domestic league appearances and goals as of 17:34, 15 June 2025 (UTC)

Braian Emanuel Lluy (born 25 April 1989) is an Argentine professional footballer who plays as a right-back for Douglas Haig.

== Career ==
Lluy came through the Racing Club youth development system to make his debut in the Avellaneda derby aged 19. He came on as a second-half substitute on 21 February 2009 in the 2–0 away defeat to Independiente. He made his first start for the club on 4 April 2009 in a 1–0 home win against River Plate. During the Apertura 2009 he featured in the majority of the club's games. On August 24, 2013, Lluy signed with Greek side Asteras Tripolis a two years' contract.
