= Mateusz Piątkowski =

Polish footballer

Personal information
- Full name: Mateusz Piątkowski
- Date of birth: 22 November 1984 (age 41)
- Place of birth: Bielawa, Poland
- Height: 1.86 m (6 ft 1 in)
- Position: Striker

Youth career
- Orzeł Piława Dolna

Senior career*
Years	Team	Apps	(Gls)
2001–2002	Lechia Dzierżoniów		
2002	Piławianka Piława Górna		
2003–2005	Polar Wrocław		
2005–2008	Gawin Królewska Wola		
2008	Gawin Ślęza Wrocław	19	(8)
2009–2010	GKP Gorzów Wielkopolski	43	(6)
2010–2012	KS Polkowice	60	(13)
2012–2013	Dolcan Ząbki	32	(14)
2013–2015	Jagiellonia Białystok	54	(21)
2015–2017	APOEL	14	(1)
2017–2018	Wisła Płock	30	(5)
2018–2019	Miedź Legnica	29	(9)
2019–2020	GKS Tychy	33	(8)
2020–2022	Górnik Polkowice	59	(25)
2023	Górnik Polkowice	11	(2)
2024	AKS Strzegom	2	(0)
- * Club domestic league appearances and goals as of 22:35, 17 June 2024 (UTC)

Mateusz Piątkowski (born 22 November 1984) is a Polish professional footballer who plays as a striker.

== Career ==
Piątkowski spent a major part of his early career playing for Polish second division teams such as GKP Gorzów Wielkopolski, KS Polkowice and Dolcan Ząbki.

=== Jagiellonia Białystok ===
He made his Ekstraklasa debut while playing for Jagiellonia Białystok in 2013–14 season, aged 28. He had an impressive second season with Jagiellonia, managing to score 14 goals in 24 appearances in the 2014–15 Ekstraklasa.

=== APOEL ===
On the 24 June 2015, aged 30, Piątkowski moved abroad for the first time in his career and signed a two-year contract with Cypriot club APOEL FC. He made his official debut on 14 July 2015, in APOEL's 0–0 home draw against FK Vardar for the second qualifying round of the UEFA Champions League. He scored his first official goal for APOEL on 26 October 2015 in his team's 9–0 away win over Nea Salamina for the Cypriot First Division. Although he was not a regular starter at APOEL's lineup and he scored only one goal, at the end of the season he was crowned champion for the first time in his career, as his team managed to win the Cypriot First Division title for a fourth time in the row. On 5 January 2017, his contract with APOEL was terminated.

=== Górnik Polkowice ===
On 5 October 2020, he signed with Górnik Polkowice. He played there until the end of the season. After that, he was out of contract for almost a year until March 2023, when he signed a short contract with the club again until the end of the season.

=== AKS Strzegom ===
On 23 March 2024, Piątkowski was announced as the new player-assistant of regional league club AKS Strzegom.

== Honours ==
APOEL

- Cypriot First Division: 2015–16

Miedź Legnica

- I liga: 2017–18

Górnik Polkowice

- II liga: 2020–21

Individual

- Ekstraklasa Player of the Month: September 2014
