= Estrela (footballer) =

Angolan footballer

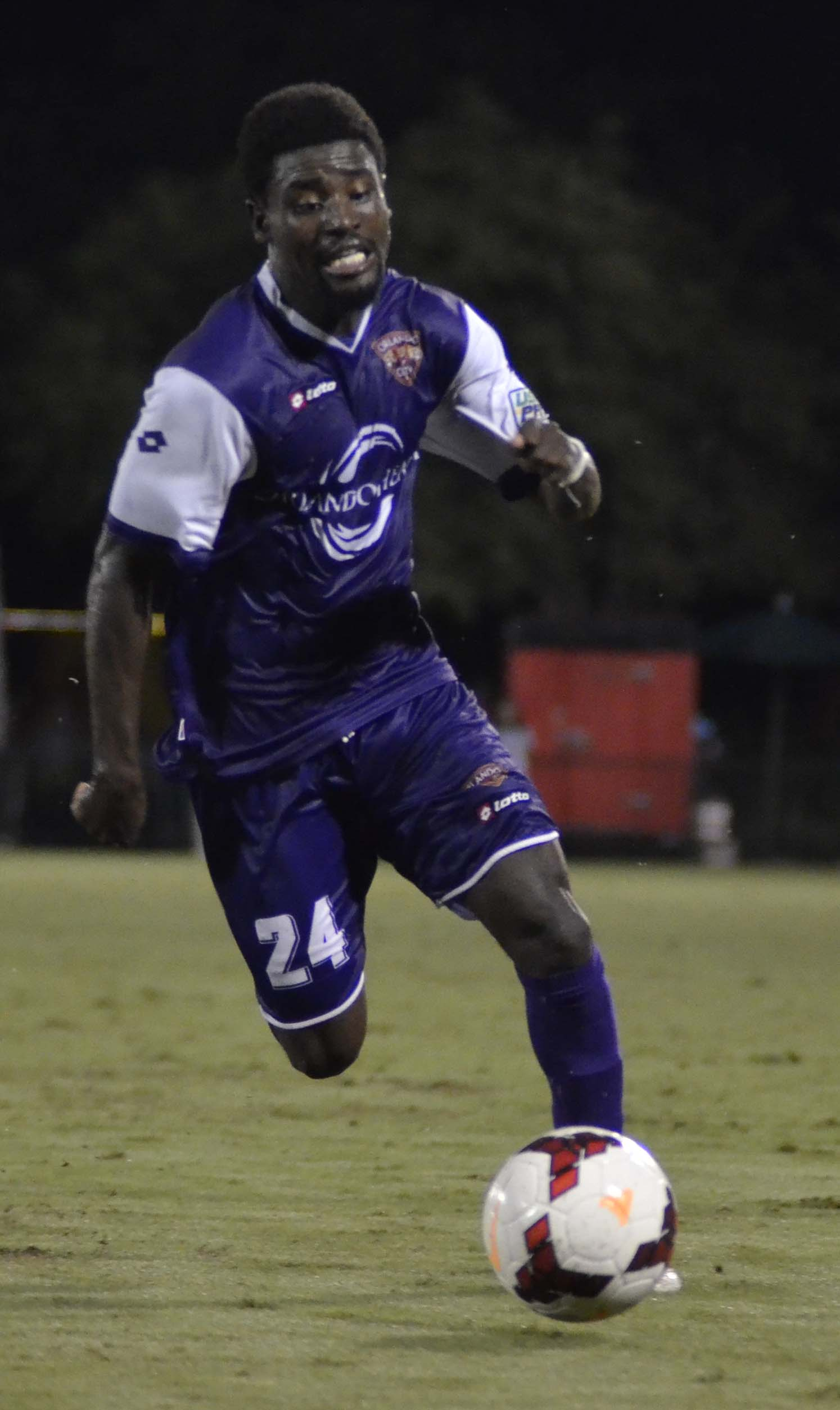
- Estrela playing for Orlando City in 2014

Personal information
- Full name: Valdmiro Tualungo Paulo Lameira
- Date of birth: 22 September 1995 (age 31)
- Place of birth: Luanda, Angola
- Height: 1.73 m (5 ft 8 in)
- Position: Defensive midfielder

Team information
- Current team: Suzhou Dongwu
- Number: 6

Youth career
- 2006–2014: Benfica

Senior career*
Years	Team	Apps	(Gls)
2014	Orlando City	5	(1)
2015	Orlando City	0	(0)
2016	APOEL	1	(0)
2016–2019	Varzim	72	(2)
2019–2020	Aves	21	(0)
2020–2021	National Bank of Egypt	17	(0)
2021–2024	Erzurumspor	84	(1)
2024–2025	Boluspor	18	(0)
2025–	Suzhou Dongwu	30	(2)

International career
2014–2015	Portugal U20	8	(0)
2020–2024	Angola	22	(2)
- * Club domestic league appearances and goals as of 8 November 2025

Valdomiro Tualungo Paulo Lameira (born 22 September 1995), commonly known as Estrela, is an Angolan professional footballer who plays as a defensive midfielder for China League One club Suzhou Dongwu and the Angola national team.

== Club career ==
Estrela began his career in S.L. Benfica's youth squad in 2006, joining the under-19 squad in 2011. He was part of the squad that competed in the 2013–14 UEFA Youth League, including a match against Manchester City under-19 in which he scored a goal. Benfica went on to be runners-up in the tournament, losing to the under-19 squad of Barcelona 0–3 in the final. He had signed a contract to stay with Benfica until 2020.

On 8 July 2014, it was announced that he and teammate Rafael Ramos were transferred to Orlando City SC of the USL Pro, the third level of the United States soccer league system, on three-and-a-half-year professional contracts as part of an affiliation between the two clubs. The players' contracts would see the two new signings finish out the 2014 USL Pro season with the club before transitioning into Major League Soccer in 2015.

He, along with Ramos, made his professional debut on 23 August 2014 in a league match against the Richmond Kickers. In the 8th minute of the match, he volleyed a strike from outside of the box to also score his first goal for the club. The 3–2 victory was notable for Ramos also scoring his first goal for the club in his debut in addition to Kevin Molino breaking the single-season league goal scoring record. After the match, head coach Adrian Heath stated in regards to the two new players, "I thought that the two new players (Estrela and Ramos) were outstanding, considering that they haven't played for two or three weeks. Their contribution was massive..."

He went on to make five league appearances for the club, scoring one goal, during the 2014 USL Pro season, Orlando City's last in the league before making the jump to Major League Soccer. The defender also started and played 90 minutes of Orlando's defeat to the Harrisburg City Islanders in the first round of the playoffs which saw Orlando eliminated. Estrela was released by Orlando on 30 January 2016.

On 1 February 2016, he joined Cypriot champions APOEL FC on a two-and-a-half-year contract. Estrela made his first and only appearance for APOEL on 27 February 2016, coming on as a 71st-minute substitute in his team's 3–0 home victory against Ayia Napa for the Cypriot First Division. A few months after joining APOEL, he crowned champion for the first time in his career, as his team managed to win the Cypriot First Division title for a fourth time in the row. On 10 August 2016, Estrela's contract with APOEL was mutually terminated. On 29 October 2016, he signed a contract until 2018 with Portuguese side Varzim S.C. from LigaPro.

On 4 July 2019 he signed a three-year contract with Primeira Liga club Aves.

== International career ==
He, along with Orlando teammate Ramos, was called to camp with the Portugal national under-20 team in October 2014, despite being born in Angola. The camp, which was his first international experience, was part of Portugal's preparation for the 2015 FIFA U-20 World Cup.

On 22 September 2020, Estrela was called up by the senior Angola national football team. He made his debut on 13 October 2020.

== Honours ==
Benfica

- UEFA Youth League runner-up: 2013–14

APOEL

- Cypriot First Division: 2015–16
