= Michalis Charalampous =

Cypriot footballer (born 1999)

Personal information
- Date of birth: 29 January 1999 (age 27)
- Place of birth: Larnaca, Cyprus
- Height: 1.61 m (5 ft 3 1/2 in)
- Position: Forward

Team information
- Current team: Enosis Neon Paralimni
- Number: 99

Youth career
- 2008–2011: P.O. Xylotymbou
- 2011–2015: Ethnikos Achna
- 2015–2016: APOEL

Senior career*
Years	Team	Apps	(Gls)
2013–2015	Ethnikos Achna	1	(0)
2015–2019	APOEL	1	(0)
2017–2018	→ Ethnikos Achna (loan)	24	(2)
2018–2019	→ Varzim (loan)	2	(0)
2019–2022	Anagennisi Deryneia	17+	(3+)
2022–2023	Ethnikos Achna	27	(5)
2023–	Enosis Neon Paralimni	88	(25)

International career^{‡}
2014–2015	Cyprus U17	6	(0)
2014–2017	Cyprus U19	15	(2)
2018–2020	Cyprus U21	5	(0)
- * Club domestic league appearances and goals as of 14 June 2026 ‡ National team caps and goals as of 4 September 2020

Michalis Charalampous (Greek: Μιχάλης Χαραλάμπους; born 29 January 1999) is a Cypriot professional footballer who plays as a forward for Enosis Neon Paralimni.

== Career ==
=== Ethnikos Achna ===
Charalampous made his Cypriot First Division debut at the age of 15, starting the match and playing for 45 minutes in Ethnikos Achna's 5–0 victory against AEK Kouklia on 18 May 2014.

=== APOEL ===
On 2 February 2015, at the age 16, he moved to Cypriot First Division champions APOEL. He made his official debut on 7 May 2016, coming on as a 71st-minute substitute in APOEL's 1–0 away defeat against Apollon Limassol at the end of the 2015–16 season.

== Honours ==
APOEL

- Cypriot First Division: 2015–16, 2016–17
