= Carlão (footballer, born January 1986) =

Brazilian footballer

Personal information
- Full name: Carlos Roberto da Cruz Júnior
- Date of birth: 19 January 1986 (age 40)
- Place of birth: São Paulo, Brazil
- Height: 1.83 m (6 ft 0 in)
- Position: Centre back

Youth career
- 2005–2006: Corinthians

Senior career*
Years	Team	Apps	(Gls)
2006–2008	Corinthians	31	(1)
2008–2014	Sochaux	139	(2)
2014–2019	APOEL	160	(5)
2016–2017	→ Torino (loan)	4	(0)
2020	Ferroviária	4	(0)
2020	Paysandu	3	(0)
2021	Mirassol	4	(0)
2021	Guarani	22	(0)
2022	Santo André	12	(0)
2022–2023	Ferroviária	12	(0)
2022	→ Ituano (loan)	9	(0)
2023	Ituano	10	(0)
- * Club domestic league appearances and goals as of 27 May 2023

Carlos Roberto da Cruz Junior, or simply Carlão (born 19 January 1986) is a Brazilian professional footballer who plays as a central defender.

== Club career ==
=== Corinthians ===
Carlão started his career with Brazilian powerhouse Corinthians where he played a total of 24 games, and scored 3 goals.

=== Sochaux ===
In July 2008, Carlão was transferred from Corinthians to the French Ligue 1 side FC Sochaux-Montbéliard, after completing a deal worth €800,000. He played for Sochaux from 2008 until 2014, appearing in 128 matches and scoring 1 goal.

=== APOEL ===
On 19 June 2014, after six French Ligue 1 seasons, he signed a two-year contract with APOEL from Cyprus. He made his APOEL debut against HJK Helsinki at Sonera Stadium on 30 July 2014, in a 2–2 first leg draw for the third qualifying round of the 2014–15 UEFA Champions League. Carlão appeared in every group stage match in APOEL's 2014–15 UEFA Champions League campaign and following his impressive performance at Camp Nou against FC Barcelona for the first week of the group stage, he was included in UEFA.com's team of the week as the best central defender. In his first season at APOEL, Carlão managed to win his first two career titles, as his team won both the Cypriot championship and the cup.

He scored his first official goal in his second season at APOEL, netting the winner in his team's 2–1 home victory against Asteras Tripolis for the group stage of the 2015–16 UEFA Europa League on 22 October 2015.

On 3 August 2016, Carlão agreed to extend his contract with APOEL until May 2019. However, on 10 January 2017, APOEL announced that they had agreed for his transfer to the Serie A side Torino, after the Italian club paid his €500,000 minimum release fee.

=== Torino ===
On 9 January 2017 he arrived in Italy, signing with Torino for two and a half seasons.

== Career statistics ==
As of 30 July 2018

Club	Season	League			Cup		League Cup		Continental		Other		Total	
Club	Season	Division	Apps	Goals	Apps	Goals	Apps	Goals	Apps	Goals	Apps	Goals	Apps	Goals
Sochaux	2008–09	Ligue 1	26	0	1	0	2	0	—		—		29	0
Sochaux	2009–10	Ligue 1	16	0	4	0	0	0	—		—		20	0
Sochaux	2010–11	Ligue 1	24	1	2	0	1	0	—		—		27	1
Sochaux	2011–12	Ligue 1	21	0	0	0	0	0	—		—		21	0
Sochaux	2012–13	Ligue 1	15	0	1	0	1	0	—		—		17	0
Sochaux	2013–14	Ligue 1	27	1	1	0	1	0	2 (Note: Appearances in UEFA Europa League)	0	—		31	1
Sochaux	Total		129	2	9	0	5	0	2	0	—		145	2
APOEL	2014–15	Cypriot First Division	20	0	4	0	—		10 (Note: Appearances in UEFA Champions League)	0	1 (Note: Appearances in Cypriot Super Cup)	0	35	0
APOEL	2015–16	Cypriot First Division	25	2	3	0	—		11 (Note: Appearances in UEFA Champions League and UEFA Europa League)	1	1	0	40	3
APOEL	2016–17	Cypriot First Division	15	0	0	0	—		12	0	0	0	27	0
Torino	2016–17	Serie A	4	0	0	0	—		—		—		4	0
APOEL	2017–18	Cypriot First Division	20	0	0	0	—		8	1	0	0	28	1
APOEL	2018–19	Cypriot First Division	0	0	0	0	—		2	0	0	0	2	0
APOEL	Total		80	2	7	0	—		43	2	2	0	132	4
Career total			213	4	16	0	5	0	45	2	2	0	281	6

== Honours ==
APOEL

- Cypriot First Division: 2014–15, 2015–16
- Cypriot Cup: 2014–15
