= Vladimir Boljević =

Montenegrin footballer

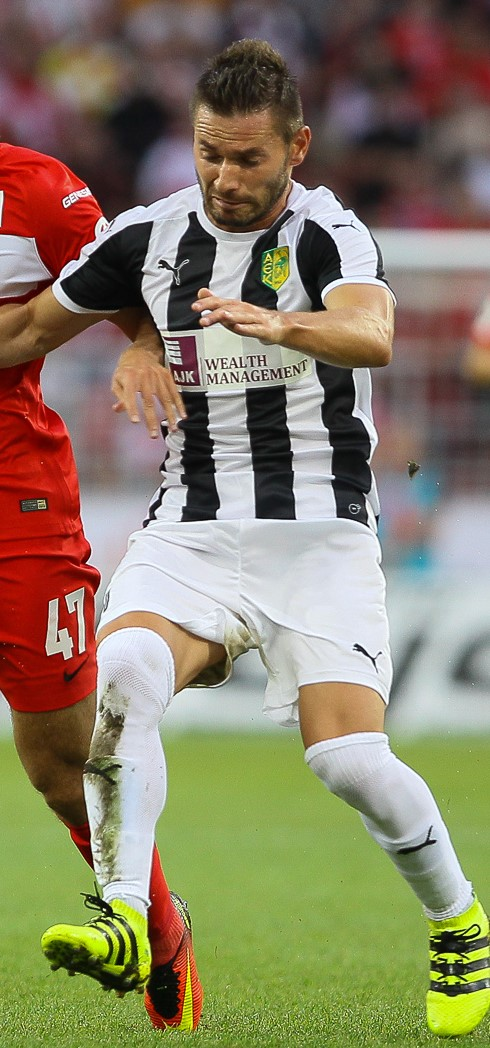

Personal information
- Full name: Vladimir Boljević
- Date of birth: 17 January 1988 (age 38)
- Place of birth: Titograd, SFR Yugoslavia
- Height: 1.75 m (5 ft 9 in)
- Position: Midfielder

Youth career
- –2006: Zeta

Senior career*
Years	Team	Apps	(Gls)
2006–2010	Zeta	98	(9)
2011–2014	Cracovia	100	(18)
2014–2018	AEK Larnaca	97	(6)
2018–2021	Doxa Katokopias	90	(2)
2021-2022	Podgorica	34	(8)
2022–2023	Iskra Danilovgrad	34	(3)

International career
2009	Montenegro U21	1	(0)
2015–2016	Montenegro	8	(0)
- * Club domestic league appearances and goals as of 17 January 2024

Vladimir Boljević (born 17 January 1988) is a Montenegrin professional footballer who plays as a midfielder.

== Playing career ==
=== Club ===
In February 2011, he moved to Polish club Cracovia, from his home club FK Zeta . Now he plays for FK Iskra Danilovgrad.

=== International ===
He was a part of Montenegro national under-21 football team. He made his senior debut for Montenegro in a June 2015 friendly match against Denmark national football team and earned a total of 8 caps, scoring no goals. His final international was a March 2016 friendly against Greece.

== Honours ==
Zeta

- Montenegrin First League: 2006–07
