= Markos Maragoudakis =

Greek-Congolese association football player

Personal information
- Date of birth: 28 January 1982 (age 44)
- Place of birth: Rethymno, Greece
- Height: 1.85 m (6 ft 1 in)
- Position: Forward

Team information
- Current team: Euklis Soronis
- Number: 11

Youth career
- –2000: Ethnikos Piraeus

Senior career*
Years	Team	Apps	(Gls)
2000–2002	Ethnikos Piraeus	34	(4)
2002–2003	PAS Giannina	0	(0)
2003–2004	Akratitos	0	(0)
2005–2009	Fostiras	52	(6)
2009–2010	PAO Rouf	27	(4)
2010–2011	Rodos	22	(5)
2011–2013	Platanias	51	(15)
2013	Panachaiki	10	(3)
2014	AO Chania	20	(6)
2015–2019	Aris Limassol	105	(24)
2019–2020	Ialysos	16	(1)
2021–	Euklis Soronis		
- * Club domestic league appearances and goals as of 12 August 2020

Markos Maragoudakis (Greek: Μάρκος Μαραγκουδάκης; born 28 January 1982) is a Greek-Congolese professional footballer who plays for Dodecanese FCA club Euklis Soronis.
