= Georgios Efrem =

Cypriot international footballer

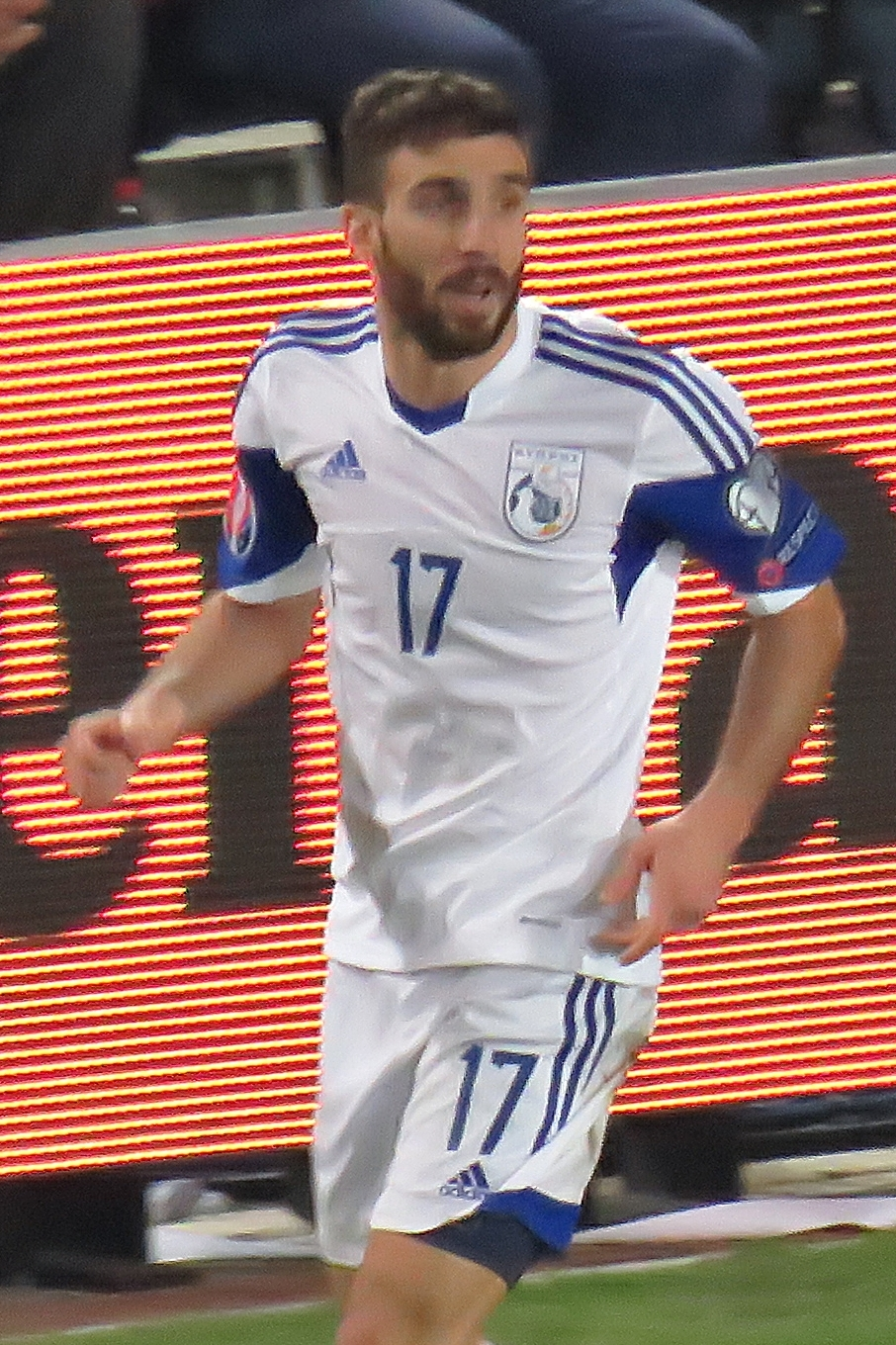
- Efrem with Cyprus

Personal information
- Full name: Giorgos Efrem
- Date of birth: 5 July 1989 (age 37)
- Place of birth: Limassol, Cyprus
- Height: 1.71 m (5 ft 7 in)
- Position: Winger

Youth career
- 2004–2007: Arsenal

Senior career*
Years	Team	Apps	(Gls)
2007–2009	Rangers	0	(0)
2009	→ Dundee (loan)	8	(2)
2009–2014	Omonia	134	(25)
2014–2024	APOEL	194	(36)
Total		336	(63)

International career^{‡}
2008–2011	Cyprus U19	11	(4)
2008–2011	Cyprus U21	4	(2)
2009–2024	Cyprus	48	(5)
- * Club domestic league appearances and goals as of 25 May 2024 ‡ National team caps and goals as of 2019-19-11

Georgios Efrem (Greek: Γεώργιος Εφραίμ, born 5 July 1989) is a former Cypriot professional footballer who last played as a winger for Cypriot First Division club APOEL and the Cyprus national team.

== Club career ==
=== Early career ===
Efrem was born in Limassol and began his career as a 15-year-old with Arsenal in 2004; he was a regular in their reserve and youth sides. However, he was unable to break into the first team, and so moved to Rangers in May 2007. He soon became a regular in the reserve team and was loaned out to Scottish First Division side Dundee to gain some first team experience on 1 February 2009. Efrem scored on his debut against Livingston a week later. He was released on 1 June 2009 by Rangers and signed with Omonia.

=== Omonia ===
Efrem had an excellent start with his new club in season 2009–10, leading Omonia to its 20th championship. In the same year, Cyprus Football Association awarded Efrem the Best Youth Player Award for the 2009–10 season. During his five-year spell with Omonia, he managed to win one championship, two Cups and two Super Cups. He also appeared in 134 league matches and scored 25 goals.

=== APOEL ===
On 6 June 2014, Efrem signed a three-year contract with APOEL. He made his APOEL debut against HJK Helsinki at Sonera Stadium on 30 July 2014, in a 2–2 first leg draw for the third qualifying round of the 2014–15 UEFA Champions League. He scored his first official goal with APOEL on 30 November 2014, netting the only goal in APOEL's 1–0 win against his former team Omonia for the Cypriot First Division. Efrem also appeared in five group stage matches in APOEL's 2014–15 UEFA Champions League campaign. On 20 May 2015, Efrem scored two goals in APOEL's 4–2 Cypriot Cup final triumph over AEL Limassol to win his first trophy with APOEL. Four days later, Efrem celebrated the double with APOEL, as his team beat 4–2 Ermis Aradippou and secured their third consecutive championship title.

Efrem received the best player of the 2015–16 Cypriot First Division Award by Cyprus Football Association, as he appeared in 24 league matches and scored 11 goals during 2015–16 season, breaking his previous personal scoring record in a single season.

The next season, he scored three times in APOEL's impressive run to the last 16 of the 2016–17 UEFA Europa League, opening the score in the away matches against Young Boys and FC Astana for the group stage and against Athletic Bilbao at San Mamés for the round of 32 of the competition.

On 17 January 2017, Efrem signed a four-year contract extension with APOEL, running until 31 May 2021.

== International career ==
He has represented Cyprus at all youth levels and captained the Cyprus under-21 team. In March 2009, he was called up to the Cyprus national team squad and in September 2009, he made his first two appearances.

On 16 November 2014, Efrem scored a hat-trick against Andorra in his team's 5–0 UEFA Euro 2016 qualifying home victory and made history by becoming the first ever Cyprus international player to score three goals in a single game.

== Career statistics ==
=== International ===
Scores and results list Cyprus' goal tally first, score column indicates score after each Efrem goal.

List of international goals scored by Georgios Efrem
No.	Date	Venue	Opponent	Score	Result	Competition	Ref.
1	16 November 2014	GSP Stadium, Nicosia, Cyprus	Andorra	2–0	5–0	UEFA Euro 2016 qualifying	
2	16 November 2014	GSP Stadium, Nicosia, Cyprus	Andorra	3–0	5–0	UEFA Euro 2016 qualifying	
3	16 November 2014	GSP Stadium, Nicosia, Cyprus	Andorra	4–0	5–0	UEFA Euro 2016 qualifying	
4	21 March 2019	GSP Stadium, Nicosia, Cyprus	San Marino	4–0	5–0	UEFA Euro 2020 qualifying	
5	16 November 2019	GSP Stadium, Nicosia, Cyprus	Scotland	1–1	1–2	UEFA Euro 2020 qualifying	

== Honours ==
=== Club ===
Omonia

- Cypriot First Division: 2009–10
- Cypriot Cup: 2010–11, 2011–12
- Cypriot Super Cup: 2010, 2012

APOEL

- Cypriot First Division: 2014–15, 2015–16, 2016–17, 2017–18, 2018–19
- Cypriot Cup: 2014–15

=== Individual ===
- Youth player of the Season (Cyprus): 2009–10
- Best player of the Cypriot First Division: 2015–16
