= Tomás De Vincenti =

Argentine footballer

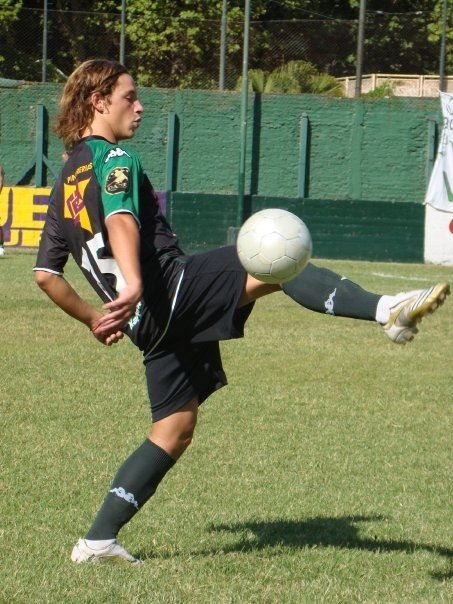

Personal information
- Full name: Tomás Sebastián De Vincenti
- Date of birth: 9 February 1989 (age 37)
- Place of birth: Buenos Aires, Argentina
- Height: 1.78 m (5 ft 10 in)
- Position: Attacking midfielder

Youth career
- 2007–2009: Excursionistas

Senior career*
Years	Team	Apps	(Gls)
2009–2013	PAS Giannina	82	(7)
2010	→ Kalamata (loan)	9	(2)
2013–2014	Olympiacos	0	(0)
2013–2014	→ PAS Giannina (loan)	10	(5)
2014	→ APOEL (loan)	16	(12)
2014–2016	APOEL	50	(18)
2016–2017	Al Shabab	23	(9)
2017	Shabab Al-Ahli	3	(1)
2018–2022	APOEL	71	(11)
2022–2023	Lamia	24	(4)
2023–2024	Ionikos	9	(3)
2024	Excursionistas	14	(1)
- * Club domestic league appearances and goals as of 12 May 2023

Tomás Sebastián De Vincenti (born 9 February 1989) is a former Argentine professional footballer who last played as an attacking midfielder for Excursionistas.

== Club career ==
=== PAS Giannina ===
Born in Buenos Aires, De Vincenti was spotted by PAS Giannina scouting team during his youth career with CA Excursionistas, resulting in his first ever professional contract, with a duration of four years. During his time at Ioannina, and despite his young age, he was one of the leading figures of his club's promotion into Super League Greece in 2011, as well as their relegation avoidance next year. During the season 2012–2013, PAS Giannina made a surprisingly good run, finishing up fifth in the league, with De Vincenti being one of the key players.

Due to the high standard of his performances in Super League, he inevitably drew the attention of several Super League clubs, including the champions, Olympiacos, and Panathinaikos. The latter side made an offer for a paid transfer during the winter transfer window, but it was rejected by the PAS Giannina board, because the player had preemptively accepted to leave on a free transfer for Olympiacos side the following summer, but also because he was an important player for the second half of the season. The decision was proven to be the right one, with PAS Giannina finishing higher on the league than Panathinaikos, despite their significantly lower budget.

Perhaps his most notable moment so far was his away goal against Panathinaikos side, which led to a valuable away draw with 1–1, during the Super League season 2012–2013. The goal was voted by Super League fans as the best goal of the entire season, gaining over 50% of the total votes. It was also featured in several worldwide best goals lists. The Panathinaikos side applauded him for this incredible effort, despite costing them 2 points that would prove to be costly for them, due to the fact that the Panathinaikos side under-performed in the season, finishing sixth on the table.

=== Olympiacos ===
De Vincenti penned a three-year contract with Super League champions Olympiacos shortly after the play-offs for the Super League ended, honoring the verbal agreement he made several months earlier. In his first season at Olympiacos he didn't manage to establish himself in the first team, and on 2 September 2013 he was given on a five-month loan at his former team PAS Giannina.

=== APOEL ===
==== 2013–14 ====
On 3 January 2014, De Vincenti joined Cypriot First Division side APOEL, on a six-month loan deal from Olympiacos. He made his official debut on 22 January 2014, excelling in APOEL's 0–1 away victory against AEL Limassol for that season's Cypriot Cup. De Vincenti made an impressive start at APOEL, scoring eight times in his first nine league matches. He scored his first two official goals on 1 February 2014, in his team's 3–0 home win against Ermis Aradippou for the Cypriot First Division and then he scored three more times in the next two league matches, once against Anorthosis in APOEL's 2–1 away win on 5 February 2014, and twice against Apollon Limassol four days later, in his team's 2–1 home victory. On 11 May 2014, De Vincenti scored the first hat-trick of his career in APOEL's 8–1 home triumph over Anorthosis for the Cypriot First Division play-offs, netting three goals in the first 32 minutes of the match. On 21 May 2014, De Vincenti scored the first goal in APOEL's 2–0 win against Ermis Aradippou in the Cypriot Cup final and won his first ever career title. Ten days later, De Vincenti won also the Cypriot First Division after APOEL's 1–0 away victory against AEL Limassol in the title deciding match of the competition.

==== 2014–15 ====
On 11 July 2014, De Vincenti joined APOEL on a three-year contract, after he completed his transfer from Olympiacos for a reported fee of €500,000. On 30 July 2014, he scored APOEL's first goal and created the second one, in his team's 2–2 first leg draw against HJK Helsinki at Sonera Stadium for the third qualifying round of the UEFA Champions League. One week later, he scored again against HJK Helsinki, converting a penalty he won himself and helping APOEL to qualify for the play-off round of the 2014–15 UEFA Champions League after a 2–0 home victory. On 26 August 2014, he scored the second goal in APOEL's 4–0 triumph over Aalborg BK for the UEFA Champions League play-off round, helping his team to reach the group stage of the UEFA Champions League. De Vincenti made also five group stage appearances in APOEL's 2014–15 UEFA Champions League campaign. On 2 May 2015, after 29 league matches without a goal, he scored his first Cypriot First Division goal for the season, opening the scoring from the penalty spot in APOEL's dramatic 3–2 win against arch rivals Omonia. On 20 May 2015, De Vincenti scored a stunning 35-meter free kick in APOEL's 4–2 Cypriot Cup final triumph over AEL Limassol to win his third trophy with APOEL in Cyprus. On 24 May 2015, De Vincenti scored the opening goal in APOEL's 4–2 victory over Ermis Aradippou and celebrated the double, as his team secured their third consecutive championship title.

==== 2015–16 ====
On 21 July 2015, De Vincenti scored APOEL's decisive away goal against FK Vardar, as his team scraped through the second qualifying round of the UEFA Champions League on the away goals rule with a 1–1 draw at Skopje. One week later he scored again, netting the second goal in APOEL's 2–1 victory against FC Midtjylland at MCH Arena for the third qualifying round of the Champions League. He ended the 2015–16 season as a champion for a third time in the row, setting a new personal league scoring record of 15 goals in 26 appearances.

==== 2016–17 ====
On 2 August 2016, in a match that proved to be his last for APOEL, De Vincenti scored the third goal in his team's 3–0 home victory against Rosenborg BK for the third qualifying round of the UEFA Champions League, as APOEL overturned a 2–1 first leg defeat and reached the play-off round of the competition.

=== Al Shabab (Dubai) ===
On 11 August 2016, De Vincenti joined the UAE Arabian Gulf League side Al Shabab on a three-year contract, after completing his transfer from APOEL for a reported fee of €3 million. On summer 2017 the club merged with Dubai CSC to re-brand the club into Shabab Al-Ahli Dubai FC.

=== Return to APOEL ===
On 25 June 2018, Vincenti returned to his former club APOEL FC on a three-year contract. He won the Cypriot First Division in the season 2018–19 and the Cypriot Super Cup in 2019.

=== Lamia ===
In summer 2022 he moved to Lamia.

=== CA Excursionistas ===
After a brief spell in the Greek club Ionikos, in February 2024, he returned to his childhood club Excursionistas in Argentina.

== Club statistics ==
As of 5 November 2022

Club	Season	League			Domestic Cup		Continental (Note: Includes UEFA Champions League and UEFA Europa League matches.)		Other (Note: Includes Cypriot Super Cup matches.)		Total	
Club	Season	Division	Apps	Goals	Apps	Goals	Apps	Goals	Apps	Goals	Apps	Goals
Kalamata (loan)	2009–10	Super League Greece 2	9	2	—		—		—		9	2
PAS Giannina	2010–11	Super League Greece	29	1	2	0	0	0	0	0	31	1
PAS Giannina	2011–12	Super League Greece	23	1	1	0	0	0	0	0	24	1
PAS Giannina	2012–13	Super League Greece	30	5	6	1	0	0	0	0	36	6
PAS Giannina (loan)	2013–14	Super League Greece	10	5	1	0	0	0	0	0	11	5
PAS Giannina (loan)	Total		92	12	10	1	—		—		102	13
APOEL (loan)	2013–14	Cypriot First Division	16	12	4	1	—		—		20	13
APOEL	2014–15	Cypriot First Division	24	3	5	3	9	3	1	0	39	9
APOEL	2015–16	Cypriot First Division	26	15	4	2	9	2	1	0	40	19
APOEL	2016–17	Cypriot First Division	0	0	0	0	3	2	0	0	3	2
APOEL	2018–19	Cypriot First Division	12	4	4	0	4	0	1	0	21	4
APOEL	2019–20	Cypriot First Division	17	4	2	0	8	3	0	0	27	7
APOEL	2020–21	Cypriot First Division	28	2	2	0	4	2	0	0	34	4
APOEL	2021–22	Cypriot First Division	14	1	2	0	0	0	0	0	16	4
APOEL	Total		137	40	23	6	33	10	3	0	200	62
Al Shabab	2016–17	UAE Arabian Gulf League	23	9	7	1	0	0	0	0	30	10
Al Shabab	2017–18	UAE Arabian Gulf League	3	1	1	0	0	0	0	0	4	1
Al Shabab	Total		26	10	8	1	0	0	0	0	34	11
Lamia	2022–23	Super League Greece	11	2	0	0	0	0	0	0	11	2
Career Total			275	66	41	8	33	10	3	0	356	88

== Honours ==
APOEL

- Cypriot First Division: 2013–14, 2014–15, 2015–16, 2018–19
- Cypriot Cup: 2013–14, 2014–15
- Cypriot Super Cup: 2013, 2019
