= Alex da Silva (footballer, born 1983) =

Brazilian footballer

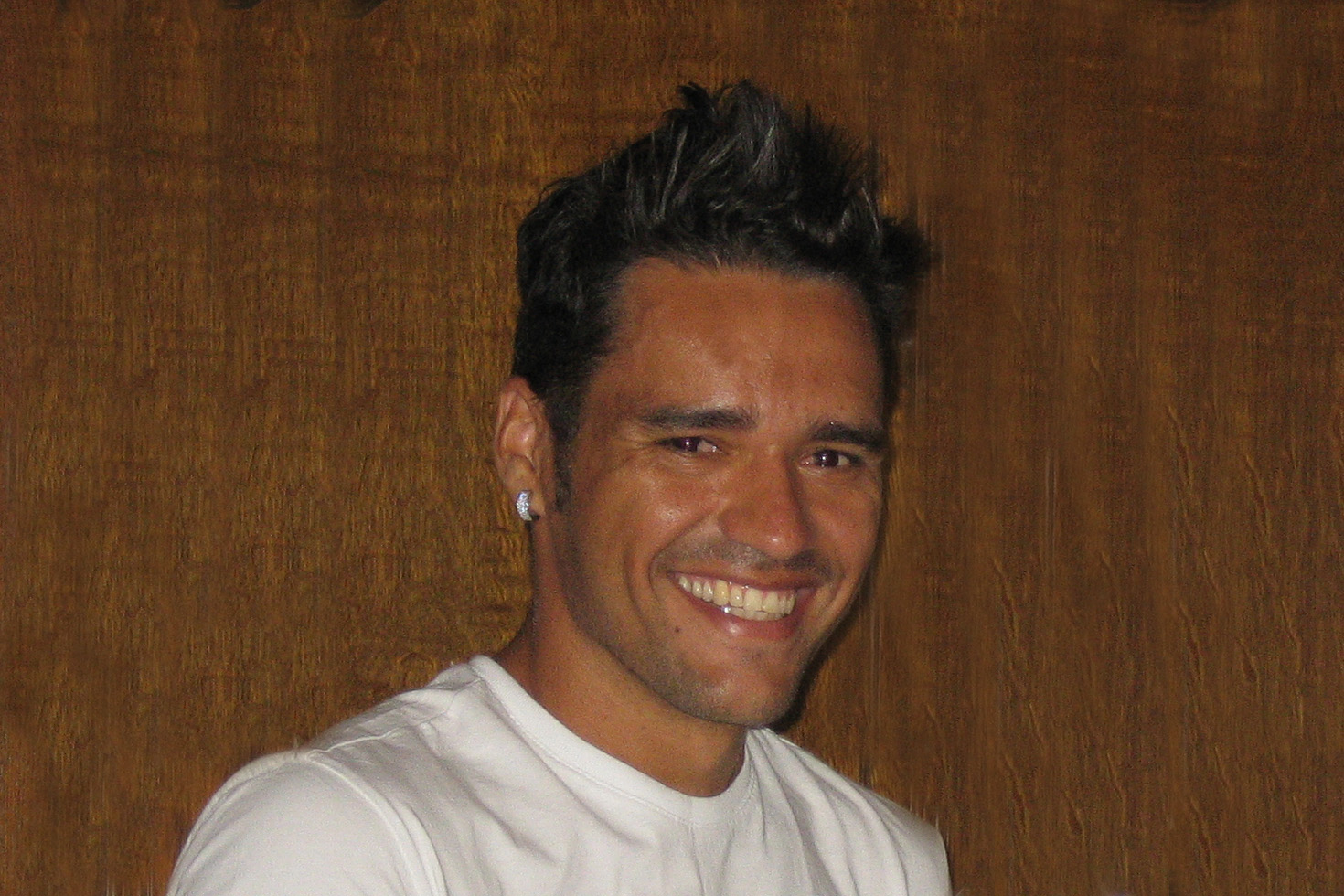
- Alex Da Silva in 2010

Personal information
- Full name: Alexandre Afonso da Silva
- Date of birth: 15 August 1983 (age 43)
- Place of birth: Uberlândia, Brazil
- Height: 1.78 m (5 ft 10 in)
- Position: Attacking midfielder

Youth career
- São Paulo
- 2000–2003: Marília

Senior career*
Years	Team	Apps	(Gls)
2003–2006	Marília		
2005	→ Santos (loan)	1	(0)
2006–2009	Racing Genk	50	(3)
2008	→ Brussels (loan)	11	(0)
2009–2010	Sint-Truiden	16	(1)
2010	Oeste	4	(0)
2010–2011	Enosis	25	(6)
2011–2012	Omonoia	14	(2)
2012–2013	AEK Larnaca	41	(7)
2013–2015	Metalurh Donetsk	42	(3)
2015–2018	Apollon Limassol	95	(24)
2018–2019	AEL Limassol	23	(5)
- * Club domestic league appearances and goals

Alexandre Afonso da Silva (born 15 August 1983), known as Alex da Silva or simply Alex, is a Brazilian former footballer who played as an attacking midfielder.

== Career ==
He signed a 3-year contract with Marília in July 2005, but on loan to Santos until the end of 2005 season. In July 2006, he joined K.R.C. Genk but his contract was disbanded in July 2009 and then on 22 July 2009 K. Sint-Truidense V.V. signed the Brazilian midfielder on a free transfer until June 2010. In August 2010 the Brazilian midfielder joined Enosis Neon Paralimni. In May 2011, he transferred to Omonia for a fee of €150,000. In January 2012, he moved to AEK Larnaca.
