= Mathew Boniface =

Nigerian footballer

Personal information
- Full name: Mathew Boniface
- Date of birth: 5 October 1994 (age 32)
- Place of birth: Kaduna, Nigeria
- Height: 1.90 m (6 ft 3 in)
- Position: Center forward

Team information
- Current team: Al-Lewaa

Youth career
- 2010–2013: Supreme court F.C. of Abuja

Senior career*
Years	Team	Apps	(Gls)
2014–2015	Supreme court	56	(24)
2015–2016	Aris Limassol	28	(8)
2016	Trepça'89	6	(1)
2017	Partizani Tirana	7	(0)
2017–2018	Akwa United	0	(0)
2019–2020	S.U. Sintrense	3	(0)
2020	Çetinkaya Türk		
2021	Al-Mujazzal		
2022–2023	Anagennisi Deryneia		
2024–	Al-Lewaa		
- * Club domestic league appearances and goals as of January 2019

Mathew Boniface (born 5 October 1994 in Kaduna) is a Nigerian footballer who plays as a striker for Saudi Arabian club Al-Lewaa.

== Career ==
Boniface began his career with Supreme court F.C. of Abuja Nigeria. In 2015, he signed with Aris Limassol FC in Cyprus First Division and in summer 2016 he joined the Kosovo club KF Trepça'89 in winter 2017 he signed with Albanian Superliga club Partizani Tirana.

On 27 July 2017, Boniface signed with Bulgarian club Beroe Stara Zagora

On 24 September 2024, Boniface joined Saudi Second Division League club Al-Lewaa.
