= 2016–17 APOEL FC season =

APOEL
2016–17 season
- Chairman: Prodromos Petrides
- Manager: Thomas Christiansen
- Stadium: GSP Stadium, Nicosia
- Cypriot First Division: 1st
- Cypriot Cup: Runners-up
- Cypriot Super Cup: Runners-up
- UEFA Champions League: Play-off round
- UEFA Europa League: Round of 16
- Top goalscorer: League: Pieros Sotiriou (21); All: Pieros Sotiriou (27)
- Highest home attendance: 19,327 vs Anderlecht (9 March 2017 – Europa League)
- Lowest home attendance: 921 (Note: The match was played behind closed doors due to APOEL's punishment for the incidents in the match against Omonia on 4 March 2017. Only children up to 12 years who were accompanied by their mothers and people beyond 65 years were allowed to attend the match.) vs AEL (5 April 2017 – Cypriot Cup)
- Average home league attendance: 8,725 (all competitions)
Home colours	Away colours	Third colours

The 2016–17 season was APOEL's 77th season in the Cypriot First Division and 89th year in existence as a football club.

== Season review ==
=== Pre-season and friendlies ===
The first training session for the season took place on 9 June 2016 at APOEL's training centre. On 18 June 2016 the team flew to Gniewino in Poland to perform the main stage of their pre-season training and returned to Cyprus on 30 June 2016. During the pre-season training stage in Poland, APOEL played four friendly matches, drawing 1–1 with FK Atlantas, losing 1–2 to Lechia Gdańsk, winning 1–0 against FK Partizan and drawing 1–1 with Viitorul Constanța. After their return to Cyprus, APOEL played one more friendly match, beating Greek side PAS Giannina 2–1 at Dasaki Stadium on 5 July 2016.

=== Cypriot Super Cup ===
On 10 August 2016, APOEL lost 1–2 to Apollon Limassol at GSP Stadium in the Super cup final. Apollon took the lead after 39 minutes when a cross from the left went past a sea of bodies and was fortuitously knocked into the net by Anton Maglica, and Arkadiusz Piech added a second with an acrobatic volley from close range eleven minutes before the end. APOEL's consolation goal came in the final minute of added time when a shot from Georgios Efrem deflected off Nuno Lopes' back to turn the ball past his own keeper.

=== Cypriot First Division ===
==== Regular season ====
APOEL's opening Cypriot First Division match against Anorthosis was originally scheduled on 20 August 2016, but was postponed and rescheduled to a later date because of APOEL's UEFA Champions League play-off matches against FC Copenhagen. On 28 August 2016, APOEL opened their competitive season with a comfortable 3–0 win at GSP Stadium against Ermis Aradippou. Nuno Morais opened the scoring five minutes before the break, before Giannis Gianniotas and Georgios Efrem complete the scoring with two goals in the last ten minutes of the match. On 10 September 2016, APOEL registered their second straight league win after thrashing Nea Salamina 4–0 at Ammochostos Stadium. Pieros Sotiriou gave his team the lead just before the half hour mark and doubled his tally eleven minutes from the end. Belgian striker Igor de Camargo got off the mark with a fine goal before laying off for Georgios Efrem to score into stoppage time. On 18 September 2016, APOEL maintained their perfect start by beating Anagennisi Deryneia 2–0 at home, following second half goals from Belgian striker Igor de Camargo and a strike from distance from Brazilian winger Vander. On 21 September 2016, in the first matchweek game which was postponed and rescheduled, APOEL dropped their first points of the season after being held to a goalless draw by Anorthosis at Antonis Papadopoulos Stadium. On 25 September 2016, APOEL had no troubles beating Aris Limassol 3–0 at Tsirion Stadium, thanks to a Giannis Gianniotas' goal just before the half-time and two second-half goals by Vinícius and Giorgos Merkis. On 2 October 2016, APOEL got a hard-earned 2–0 win over Doxa Katokopias at GSP Stadium thanks to two late goals from Georgios Efrem and Giannis Gianniotas. On 15 October 2016, APOEL beat AEZ Zakakiou 4–1 at Pafiako Stadium, to register their sixth win in the first seven matches. Facundo Bertoglio and Pieros Sotiriou scored for APOEL in the first half, while Georgios Efrem scored twice in the second half to make it 4–0. Konstantinos Pangalos scored AEZ's consolation goal in the last minute of the match, marking APOEL's first conceded league goal of the season. On 24 October 2016, APOEL claimed a hard-fought 2–0 win over Ethnikos Achna at GSP Stadium thanks to two second half goals by Pieros Sotiriou. On 29 October 2016, in the top of the table clash, APOEL and AEK Larnaca shared the spoils in a 1–1 draw at the new AEK Arena at Larnaca. APOEL opened the scoring on the hour mark after Vinícius took advantage of AEK's defenders mistake to slot the ball into an empty net. AEK equalized just six minutes later after Daniel Mojsov's back-post header hit André Alves' head before finding the net. These were the first points dropped by AEK so far this season after eight straight wins, but the result still kept them at the top, two points ahead of APOEL. On 6 November 2016, two days before their 90th birthday anniversary, APOEL beat Karmiotisssa 4–1 at home, and remained in the second place, three points behind AEK Larnaca. Pieros Sotiriou opened the scoring for APOEL after 13 minutes, but David Poljanec got an equalizer for Karmiotissa in the 36th minute. Pieros Sotiriou netted his second ten minutes after the restart to give again his team the lead, while APOEL managed to score two more goals in the last 15 minutes through Efstathios Aloneftis and Renan Bressan. On 19 November 2016, APOEL suffered their first league defeat of the season, losing 0–1 away to AEL Limassol thanks to an 86th minute penalty by Mikel Arruabarrena. On 28 November 2016, APOEL drew 1–1 at home against Apollon Limassol and dropped to third place of the league table, four points behind leaders AEK Larnaca. Alex da Silva gave Apollon the lead midway through the second half after converting a penalty, but Facundo Bertoglio scored a last-gasp equalizer with a close range diving header to rescue a point for APOEL. On 3 December 2016, APOEL ended the first round of the regular season with a resounding 4–1 away win over their arch-rivals Omonia and moved to within two points of the top of the table. APOEL took the lead in the 18th minute with a penalty converted by Georgios Efrem, while Omonia's defender Carlitos was sent off in the same incident. With the numerical advantage in their favour, APOEL scored two more goals before the half time through Pieros Sotiriou. Renato Margaça managed to pull one back for Omonia early in the second half, but Vinícius wrapped up the goals for the day with APOEL's fourth in the 67th minute. On 12 December 2016, APOEL beat Anorthosis 2–1 at home and joined the leading duo AEK and AEL on 33 points at the top of the table. Igor de Camargo put APOEL ahead four minutes before the halftime, and Iñaki Astiz added a second in the 89th minute. Anorthosis managed only to pull a goal back a minute later through Esmaël Gonçalves. On 17 December 2016, APOEL drew 1–1 away against Ermis Aradippou and dropped to third place of the league table, despite completely outplaying their opponents counting 25 attempts on goal as opposed to just two from Ermis. Edward Mashinya gave his teams the lead in the ninth minute and APOEL equalized thanks to a Facundo Bertoglio's header twelve minutes from the end. On 21 December 2016, in the last match of the year, Igor de Camargo's 47th-minute header was enough for APOEL to beat Nea Salamina 1–0 at home and move up to second place, two points behind AEK Larnaca. On 3 January 2017, APOEL moved to the top of the table along with AEL Limassol after a comfortable 4–2 away win against bottom placed Anagennisi Deryneia. Efstathios Aloneftis opened the scoring for APOEL in the 10th minute and seven minutes later Vinícius doubled his teams' lead with a close range header. Vinícius added a third on the hour mark, but twenty minutes from time, Deryneia scored twice in the space of 90 seconds with Wesllem and Rúben Brígido, before Giannis Gianniotas score APOEL's fourth two minutes later to seal the three points for his team. On 8 January 2017, APOEL thrashed Aris Limassol 5–0 at home to sit alone at the top of the standings for the first time in the season. Pieros Sotiriou scored the first hat-trick of his career with less than an hour played, while Georgios Efrem completed APOEL's easy victory with a brace. On 14 January 2017, APOEL beat Doxa Katokopias 2–0 at Makario Stadium thanks to a first half goal from Igor de Camargo and a Pieros Sotiriou's header eleven minutes from time. On 22 January 2017, APOEL increased their lead at the top to three points after thrashing AEZ Zakakiou 7–0 at GSP Stadium. Early strikes from Cypriots Efstathios Aloneftis, Pieros Sotiriou, Giorgos Merkis, and braces from strikers David Barral (who made his debut) and Igor de Camargo ensured an emphatic win for the Cypriot champions. On 29 January 2017, APOEL moved five points clear at the top of the league standings after a 3–2 away win against Ethnikos Achna. Ethnikos took the lead through Ioannis Chadjivasilis after just 13 minutes, but Igor de Camargo equalized for visitors 10 minutes later. Defender Iñaki Astiz gave APOEL the lead in the 38th minute, while Giannis Gianniotas secured the win twelve minutes from time. Eduardo Pincelli managed just to pull one back for Ethnikos from the penalty spot in the fifth minute of the added time. On 5 February 2017, in the top of the table clash, APOEL were held to a 1–1 draw by AEK Larnaca at the GSP Stadium, allowing AEL and Apollon to move to within three and four points off the top. AEK's new signing Florian Taulemesse opened the scoring eight minutes before the break, and APOEL managed to equalize 15 minutes from the end through Pieros Sotiriou who took advantage of a lapse in the AEK defence and slid the ball past goalkeeper. On 5 February 2017, APOEL extended their lead at the top to five points following their narrow 1–0 away win over Karmiotissa and the failure of their closest rivals AEL and Apollon to defeat their opponents. With their Europa League tie against Athletic Bilbao at the back of their minds, APOEL managed to clinch the win thanks to a Facundo Bertoglio's goal in the 5th minute after an excellent combination with Efstathios Aloneftis. On 20 February 2017, APOEL beat AEL Limassol 3–0 at the GSP Stadium in the top-of-the-table clash and moved six points clear at the top. Despite that, coach Thomas Christiansen rested six players ahead of the crucial UEFA Europa League round of 32 match against Athletic Bilbao, APOEL got an easy and well deserved victory. Vinícius put APOEL ahead on 34 minutes with a close range header and Nuno Morais doubled the score after a dreadful Kevin Lafrance mistake in the 78th minute. Igor de Camargo scored the third in stoppage time from the penalty spot after being brought down by AEL goalkeeper. On 27 February 2017, APOEL lost 2–0 away to second placed Apollon Limassol following goals from Anton Maglica and João Pedro, and the gap between the two teams was reduced to just three points. On 4 March 2017, APOEL beat arch-rivals Omonia 2–1 at home and ended the regular season atop league standings, four points ahead of second placed AEK Larnaca. Two penalties converted by Pieros Sotiriou and David Barral in the last two minutes of the first half were enough to give APOEL a deserved win, while Matt Derbyshire scored the consolation goal for Omonia three minutes before the end.

==== Play-offs ====
On 12 March 2017, in the opening round of the championship play-offs, APOEL managed a narrow 1–0 win away to Anorthosis thanks to a Pieros Sotiriou's header early in the first half and opened up a six-point lead at the top, following AEK Larnaca's 1–1 draw with Omonia. On 20 March 2017, APOEL beat AEL Limassol 2–0 at home and increased their lead at the top of the table to seven points. APOEL took the lead in last minute of the first half when Pieros Sotiriou won and converted a penalty, and extended their lead three minutes after the restart through Roger Cañas who scored his first goal with a strike from just inside the area. On 1 April 2017, a late AEK Larnaca strike stunned leaders APOEL as they suffer a 1–2 defeat and their advantage over second placed Apollon Limassol reduced to just four points. Nuno Morais gave APOEL the lead after eight minutes, but AEK won the match thanks to an 81st minute Nestoras Mitidis equalizer, and Jorge Larena's free-kick in the third minute of the stoppage time. On 9 April 2017, a free kick goal in the fourth minute by Lorenzo Ebecilio was enough to give APOEL the three points against arch rivals Omonia, as they won 1–0 at home and moved seven points clear at the top of the table. On 13 April 2017, in the top-of-the-table clash at the Tsirion Stadium between Apollon Limassol and APOEL, a goal by Fotios Papoulis late in the first half was enough to give the Limassol side a 1–0 win over the league leaders and reduce the gap at the top of the table to four points. On 23 April 2017, APOEL were held to a 1–1 draw by Anorthosis at the GSP Stadium, but they maintained their four points advantaged from the second placed teams AEK and Apollon. Anorthosis took the lead against the run of play with a 36th minute Iñigo Calderón's header, and APOEL managed to salvage the draw thanks to a late goal by Cédric Yambéré. On 30 April 2017, APOEL took a decisive step towards their fifth consecutive league title after beating 4–1 AEL at Limassol, while AEK defeated Apollon and remained four points behind the top. Vander opened the score in the 17th minute after a great solo run and then he set up Lorenzo Ebecilio to double the score just before the break. Pieros Sotiriou managed to score twice for APOEL in the last fifteen minutes, while AEL's consolation goal came through a late Bogdan Mitrea's penalty. On 7 May 2017, in the top-of-the-table clash, APOEL were held to a goalless draw by AEK Larnaca at the GSP Stadium and remained four points clear at the top of the league table, two matches before the end. On 13 May 2017, APOEL clinched their 26th league title and the fifth in a row after coming from behind to beat arch-rivals Omonia 3–1 at the GSP Stadium. Matt Derbyshire put Omonia into a ninth-minute lead with a header, but the lead was cancelled out eight minutes before the break by Efstathios Aloneftis who scored from close range. Six minutes into the second half, Georgios Efrem won a penalty which was converted by Pieros Sotiriou to give APOEL the lead, while substitute Vander added a third in stoppage time to secure another league title for his team. On 20 May 2017, APOEL and Apollon drew 2–2 at the GSP Stadium, in match were both managers fielded only reserve and young players in order to rest their best players ahead of their Cypriot Cup final clash four days later. APOEL came twice from behind and saved the point in the last minute of the match thanks to goals by Facundo Bertoglio and Igor de Camargo, cancelling out Apollon's second half goals from Arkadiusz Piech and Ioannis Pittas.

=== Cypriot Cup ===
==== Second round ====
APOEL entered the second round of the 2016–17 Cypriot Cup, drawing to face Cypriot First Division side Nea Salamina.

On 18 January 2017, APOEL came from behind to secure a 2–1 first leg win over Nea Salamina at GSP Stadium. Georgios Kolokoudias put the visitors ahead from the penalty spot after 25 minutes, but two second half goals in the space of five minutes by Vander and Andrea Orlandi secured a narrow advantage for APOEL. On 25 January 2017, APOEL clinched another 2–1 win over Nea Salamina to advance 4–2 on aggregate from the Ammochostos Stadium. Pieros Sotiriou opened the scoring after just nine minutes and Efstathios Aloneftis doubled APOEL's advantage twenty minutes from time, while Dimitar Makriev score a late consolation goal for Salamina.

==== Quarter-finals ====
In the Cypriot cup quarter-finals, APOEL were drawn to face Cypriot First Division side AEL Limassol.

On 5 April 2017, APOEL's coach Thomas Christiansen decided to rest several regular starters as his side held to a goalless draw by AEL Limassol in the first leg of their Cyprus Cup quarter-final meeting. On 19 April 2017, APOEL advanced to the semi-finals of the Cypriot Cup on the away goals rule following a 1–1 draw in Limassol against AEL, despite playing the whole of the second half with ten men due to Vander's sending off late in the first half. APOEL overcame this disadvantage to score the valuable away goal seven minutes into the second half with David Barral who took the advantage after a sloppy play by AEL defenders, while AEL managed just to pull a goal back nine minutes before the end with a close range header by Mikel Arruabarrena.

==== Semi-finals ====
In the semi-finals of the Cypriot cup, APOEL were drawn to face Cypriot First Division side Doxa Katokopias.

On 26 April 2017, APOEL all but booked their place in the Cypriot Cup final after clinching a vital 2–0 away win over relegation-battling Doxa Katokopias. APOEL took the lead a few seconds before the half-time with a goal by David Barral, while Iñaki Astiz settled the final score in the 62nd minute to give APOEL a strong advantage ahead of the second leg clash. On 3 May 2017, despite fielding a team based only on reserve players, APOEL easily beat Doxa Katokopias 5–0 at the GSP Stadium and booked their place to the Cypriot Cup final. Efstathios Aloneftis, Kostakis Artymatas and Facundo Bertoglio scored in the first 45 minutes, while Igor de Camargo and Vinícius added two more for APOEL in the second half.

==== Final ====
On 24 May 2017, APOEL suffered 0–1 defeat by Apollon Limassol at the GSP Stadium in the 2016–17 Cypriot Cup final, and lost the chance to achieve a domestic double. Paulo Vinícius scored the winner with a header in the 79th minute, despite Apollon playing for the last 30 minutes with a man down after the sending off of Alex da Silva.

=== UEFA Champions League ===
==== Second qualifying round ====
APOEL won the Cypriot league last season and as such entered the second qualifying round of the 2016–17 UEFA Champions League. APOEL were drawn to start their campaign against Welsh champions The New Saints.

On 12 July 2016, APOEL endured a frustrating opening Champions League campaign after being held to a 0–0 draw against The New Saints in their first leg tie in Wales. Thomas Christiansen's side dominated possession and missed decent chances to score against a stubborn TNS side that sat back and defended in numbers for 90 minutes.

On 19 July 2016, APOEL sealed their passage to the third qualifying round with a comfortable 3–0 win over The New Saints at the GSP Stadium. Despite dominating possession, APOEL remained goalless after the first 45 minutes, as TNS defended in numbers. However, Nektarios Alexandrou broke the deadlock nine minutes after the restart when his deflected shot from outside the area eluded goalkeeper Paul Harrison. Pieros Sotiriou doubled APOEL's advantage in the 73rd minute, firing home from close range to end any TNS hopes for a comeback. Tomás De Vincenti added the third goal deep into the injury time with a penalty which he won and converted himself.

==== Third qualifying round ====
APOEL were drawn to face Norwegian champions Rosenborg BK in the third qualifying round of the 2016–17 UEFA Champions League.

On 27 July 2016, APOEL suffered 2–1 loss to Rosenborg at Lerkendal Stadion, but the vital away goal gave the team a good chance and plenty of hope of reaching the play-off round of the competition. Christian Gytkjær scored the opener for Norwegian side after 23 minutes and Jørgen Skjelvik added a second with a high finish just a few seconds before the half-time break. The Nicosia's side future in Europe looked in serious doubt after the bad first half performance, but an improved second half display and Georgios Efrem's 67th minute volley gave APOEL's plenty of hope of overturning the deficit in the second leg in Nicosia.

On 2 August 2016, APOEL scored three goals in the injury time and booked their place in the Champions League play-off round after a dramatic 3–0 home victory against Rosenborg. Despite controlling the game from the first minute and pushing Rosenborg's defense, APOEL remained goalless until the 90th minute of the match. APOEL's persistence rewarded in the first minute of the injury time when Vander's low cross picked out by Giannis Gianniotas at the far post who poked home what looked to be a certain winner. Rosenborg threw everybody forward for a leveler, and five minutes later APOEL hit on the counterattack as Vander smashed the ball into the roof of the net to make it 2–0. Almost straight after kick-off, a mix-up in the Norwegian defense handed Tomás De Vincenti the chance to volley in from thirty yards with goal unguarded to send the home crowd into jubilation after an enduring night.

After beating Rosenborg, APOEL sealed European group stage football for the sixth time in the last eight seasons, as they secured a least their participation in the UEFA Europa League group stage.

==== Play-off round ====
APOEL were drawn to face Danish champions FC Copenhagen in the play-off round of the Champions League, as they attempt to reach the group stages for the fourth time in their history.

On 16 August 2016, APOEL suffered a 1–0 loss away to FC Copenhagen in their first-leg Champions League playoff clash. A goal two minutes before the break from Andrija Pavlović gave Copenhagen a narrow but deserved win, leaving APOEL with plenty of work to do in the return match in Nicosia.

On 24 August 2016, APOEL came very close to qualify for the UEFA Champions League group stage, before a late FC Copenhagen goal saw their hopes evaporate after a 1–1 draw at GSP Stadium. APOEL managed to cancel out Copenhagen's 1–0 lead from the first leg on 69 minutes, when Pieros Sotiriou showed more determination than Copenhagen's defender Erik Johansson to set himself up for a one-on-one chance, before striking the ball low and hard through keeper Robin Olsen's legs to level the tie. But four minutes before the end and just as the game looked to be heading to the extra time, Federico Santander was given too much space in the area to pick out his spot and beat Boy Waterman with a swerving shot inside his near post.

Despite APOEL's hopes for a fourth Champions League group stage campaign came to an end, their European season continued in the group stage of the UEFA Europa League.

=== UEFA Europa League ===
==== Group stage ====
After being eliminated by FC Copenhagen in the play-off round of the Champions League, APOEL were automatically transferred to the group stage of the UEFA Europa League, drawn in Group B alongside Olympiacos, Young Boys and FC Astana.

On 15 September 2016, APOEL got their Europa League group stage campaign off to a winning start after coming from behind to beat FC Astana 2–1 at GSP Stadium. Despite APOEL's dominant performance for the whole 90 minutes, Astana unexpectedly took the lead just before the half-time when Nemanja Maksimović's deflected shot evaded Boy Waterman. APOEL kept dominating after the break and managed to equalize in the 75th minute with Vinícius, who blasted the ball into the net from close range. Igor de Camargo, who came on as a 70th-minute substitute, steered home the winner three minutes before the end with a powerful header to give APOEL their first three points in the group. On 29 September 2015, APOEL earned their first ever continental group stage away win with a shock 0–1 victory over Olympiacos in Piraeus and went top of Group B with six points. In a very difficult game, APOEL heroically defended to many attempts of Olympiacos, managing to escape with a famous win thanks to a 10th-minute header from Pieros Sotiriou. On 20 October 2016, two second-half penalties condemned APOEL to their first defeat of their Europa League campaign, as they went down 3–1 away to Young Boys. Georgios Efrem put APOEL ahead with an amazing lob in the 14th minute, but four minutes later Guillaume Hoarau levelled the score with a close-range finish. Seven minutes after the break, Hoarau converted the rebound after seeing his penalty saved to give his team the lead, and completed his hat-trick from the penalty spot eight minutes from time. On 3 November 2016, APOEL achieved an important 1–0 victory over Young Boys at GSP Stadium, which left them on the brink of qualification to the knockout phase of the Europa League. Pieros Sotiriou made APOEL's heavy pressure count in the 69th minute with neat near-post finish, ensuring his side remain Group B's leaders, two points clear of second placed Olympiacos and five of third placed Young Boys. On 24 November 2016, APOEL made history after becoming the first Cypriot club to reach the knockout phase of the UEFA Europa League, despite losing 2–1 away to FC Astana. APOEL sealed their place in the Round of 32, after Young Boys drew 1–1 away with Olympiacos to leave APOEL on nine points, Olympiacos on eight, Young Boys on five and Astana on four points, with only one more game still to play. In the match at Kazakhstan, APOEL got off to a magnificent start when Georgios Efrem scored with a fierce angled half-volley to put the visitors in front just after the half-hour mark. However, APOEL's joy soon turned to worry two minutes later when Iñaki Astiz was sent off for a professional foul. Just before the hour mark, Marin Aničić levelled from close range after Boy Waterman fumbled his catch from a corner, and six minutes before the end Đorđe Despotović bundled in a second for the home side, after his initial attempt hit the post. In their final match of the group APOEL were hosting Olympiacos at GSP Stadium, and a draw would be enough for the Cypriot champions to secure the first place of the group. On 8 December 2016, APOEL secured top spot in Group B of the Europa League after an impressive 2–0 win over Olympiacos at the GSP stadium, and set a new club (and national) record by accruing 12 points in this season's group stage. APOEL took the lead after 19 minutes, when Pieros Sotiriou lifted the ball over onrushing keeper Nicola Leali and then forced Olympiacos' defender Manuel da Costa to roll the ball into his team's net. In the 83rd minute, Igor de Camargo slotted the ball home from close range after an accurate low cross from Nuno Morais to secure APOEL's decisive victory.

That was the first time that a Cypriot side had reached the knockout phase of the Europa League, although APOEL did make history back in 2012 when they stunned the world football world by reaching the quarter-finals of the UEFA Champions League.

==== Round of 32 ====

APOEL's 2016–17 UEFA Europa League starting line-up that managed to beat Athletic Bilbao 2–0 at home and reached the last 16 of the competition.

Despite being one of the seeded teams, APOEL handed a tough draw in the UEFA Europa League round of 32 as they were drawn to face Basque giants Athletic Bilbao.

On 16 February 2017, APOEL managed to keep the dream of reaching the last 16 of the UEFA Europa League alive, after a 3–2 first leg defeat by Athletic Bilbao at San Mamés. Georgios Efrem gave APOEL the lead after beating Gorka Iraizoz with a curling effort in the 36 minute, but Athletic managed to tie the match two minutes later with an own goal by Giorgos Merkis. Athletic piled on the pressure after the break, and scored two more goals until the 72nd minute, first with Aritz Aduriz who took advantage of a Cédric Yambéré's mistake and then with a close range header by Iñaki Williams. However, APOEL had the last word as in the 89th minute Giannis Gianniotas got into the area and drilled the ball beyond Gorka Iraizoz for a priceless second away goal to keep APOEL's hopes alive ahead of the second leg's encounter in Nicosia.

On 23 February 2017, APOEL went through to the last 16 of the Europa League after a stunning 2–0 win over Athletic Bilbao in Nicosia, overturning the 3–2 deficit from the first leg. Athletic Bilbao maintained possession in the first half, but APOEL managed to take their chances in the second. Within ten second-half minutes, APOEL managed to get a 2–0 lead. The first goal came twenty seconds into the second half through a fantastic acrobatic finish from Pieros Sotiriou, and the second followed eight minutes later when Giannis Gianniotas won and converted a penalty to give his team a two goals advantage. Despite APOEL having been left with 10 men from the 65th minute, when Pieros Sotiriou got a second yellow card for a tough challenge, Athletic was unable to created any real threats until the end of the match, and APOEL sealed their spot in the last 16 of the Europa League for the first time in their history.

==== Round of 16 ====
APOEL were drawn to face Belgian side R.S.C. Anderlecht in the last 16 of the UEFA Europa League.

On 9 March 2017, APOEL fell to their first home defeat of this season in all competitions, suffering a narrow 0–1 first-leg defeat against Anderlecht in Nicosia. Nicolae Stanciu put Anderlecht ahead after 29 minutes with a low shot inside the area after APOEL's defence gave the ball away. APOEL piled on the pressure after the break and almost got the equalizer in the 87th minute when Vander hit the bar from a 40-yard free kick, but failed to score any goal and Anderlecht took a narrow advantage ahead of the next week's match in Belgium.

On 16 March 2017, APOEL were eliminated from the Europa League with their heads held high following a 0–1 defeat by Anderlecht at Constant Vanden Stock Stadium, bringing their memorable campaign to an end at the last-16 of the competition. The Cypriot champions travelled to Brussels with a depleted side as they were missing key players Nuno Morais, Vinícius, Georgios Efrem and Iñaki Astiz. In the 65th minute, as happened in the first leg, APOEL's players gave the ball away in the middle of the field and Frank Acheampong struck from close range after a quick counterattack to give Anderlecht another narrow 1–0 win and a place to the quarter-finals of the competition.

== Current squad ==
Last Update: 1 February 2017

Note: Flags indicate national team as defined under FIFA eligibility rules; some limited exceptions apply. Players may hold more than one non-FIFA nationality.

No.	Pos.	Nation	Player
2	DF	CYP	Kypros Christoforou (on loan from Aris Limassol)
3	DF	ESP	Roberto Lago
4	MF	CYP	Kostakis Artymatas
6	MF	NED	Lorenzo Ebecilio
7	MF	CYP	Georgios Efrem
9	FW	BEL	Igor de Camargo
10	MF	ARG	Facundo Bertoglio
11	MF	CYP	Nektarios Alexandrou (captain)
16	MF	BRA	Vinícius
17	FW	ESP	David Barral
19	FW	CYP	Michalis Charalambous
20	FW	CYP	Pieros Sotiriou
21	DF	BUL	Zhivko Milanov

No.	Pos.	Nation	Player
23	DF	ESP	Iñaki Astiz
26	MF	POR	Nuno Morais (vice-captain)
30	DF	CYP	Giorgos Merkis
31	MF	CYP	Vasilios Papafotis
44	DF	CYP	Nicholas Ioannou
46	FW	CYP	Efstathios Aloneftis (4th captain)
70	MF	GRE	Giannis Gianniotas (on loan from Olympiacos)
77	MF	BRA	Vander Vieira
78	GK	ESP	Urko Pardo (3rd captain)
80	MF	COL	Roger Cañas (on loan from Astana)
90	DF	CAF	Cédric Yambéré (on loan from Bordeaux)
98	GK	CYP	Antreas Paraskevas
99	GK	NED	Boy Waterman

For recent transfers, see List of Cypriot football transfers summer 2016.
Also, see List of Cypriot football transfers winter 2016–17.

=== Out on loan ===
Note: Flags indicate national team as defined under FIFA eligibility rules; some limited exceptions apply. Players may hold more than one non-FIFA nationality.

No.	Pos.	Nation	Player
–	DF	CYP	Christos Kallis (on loan at Alki Oroklini)
22	DF	CYP	Paris Psaltis (on loan at Ermis Aradippou)
25	DF	CYP	Rafael Anastasiou (on loan at Anagennisi Deryneia)

No.	Pos.	Nation	Player
33	DF	GRE	Kyriakos Aretas (on loan at Doxa Katokopias)
45	MF	CYP	Georgios Christodoulou (on loan at Anagennisi Deryneia)

Loan deals expire at the end of 2016–17 season

=== International players ===
- (Greece) Giannis Gianniotas
- (Bulgaria) Zhivko Milanov
- (Central African Republic) Cédric Yambéré

- (Cyprus) Nektarios Alexandrou
- (Cyprus) Efstathios Aloneftis
- (Cyprus) Kostakis Artymatas
- (Cyprus) Kypros Christoforou
- (Cyprus) Georgios Efrem
- (Cyprus) Nicholas Ioannou
- (Cyprus) Giorgos Merkis
- (Cyprus) Pieros Sotiriou

- (Cyprus) Vasilios Papafotis (U-21)
- (Cyprus) Michalis Charalambous (U-19)
- (Cyprus) Antreas Paraskevas (U-19)

=== Foreign players ===
EU Nationals

- (Portugal) (Europe) Nuno Morais
- (Spain) (Belgium) (Europe) Urko Pardo
- (Spain) (Europe) Iñaki Astiz
- (Spain) (Europe) Roberto Lago
- (Spain) (Europe) David Barral
- (Netherlands) (Europe) Boy Waterman
- (Netherlands) (Europe) Lorenzo Ebecilio
- (Bulgaria) (Europe) Zhivko Milanov
- (Greece) (Europe) Giannis Gianniotas

EU Nationals (Dual citizenship)

- (Argentina) (Italy) (Europe) Facundo Bertoglio
- (Brazil) (Belgium) (Europe) Igor de Camargo
- (Central African Republic) (France) (Europe) Cédric Yambéré

Non-EU Nationals

- (Brazil) Vinícius
- (Brazil) Vander Vieira
- (Colombia) Roger Cañas

=== Squad changes ===
In:

No.	Pos.	Nat.	Name	Age	EU	Moving from	Type	Transfer window	Ends	Transfer fee	Source
—	RW	(Cyprus)	Alex Konstantinou	24	EU	(Cyprus) Doxa Katokopias	Loan return →	Summer	2017	Free	—
1	GK	(Spain)	Jordi Codina	34	EU	(Cyprus) Pafos	Loan return →	Summer	2017	Free	—
8	AM	(Spain)	Andrea Orlandi	31	EU	(Cyprus) Anorthosis	Transfer ✓	Summer	2017	Free	apoelfc.com.cy
13	RW	(Portugal)	Carlitos	23	EU	(Cyprus) Doxa Katokopias	Transfer ✓	Summer	2019	€120K	apoelfc.com.cy
14	CM	(Albania)	Qazim Laçi	20	Non-EU	(Greece) Olympiacos	Loan →	Summer	2017	Free	apoelfc.com.cy
88	AM	(Belarus)	Renan Bressan	27	EU	(Portugal) Rio Ave	Transfer ✓	Summer	2018	Free	apoelfc.com.cy
3	LB	(Spain)	Roberto Lago	30	EU	(Spain) Getafe	Transfer ✓	Summer	2018	Free	apoelfc.com.cy
70	RW	(Greece)	Giannis Gianniotas	22	EU	(Greece) Olympiacos	Loan extension →	Summer	2017	Free	apoelfc.com.cy
9	CF	(Belgium)	Igor de Camargo	33	EU	(Belgium) Genk	Transfer ✓	Summer	2018	Free	apoelfc.com.cy
10	AM	(Argentina)	Facundo Bertoglio	26	EU	(Ukraine) Dynamo Kyiv	Transfer ✓	Summer	2018	Undisclosed	apoelfc.com.cy
2	RB	(Cyprus)	Kypros Christoforou	23	EU	(Cyprus) Aris Limassol	Loan →	Summer	2017	€20K	apoelfc.com.cy
17	CF	(Spain)	David Barral	33	EU	(Spain) Granada	Transfer ✓	Winter	2018	Free	apoelfc.com.cy
90	CB	(Central African Republic)	Cédric Yambéré	26	EU	(France) Bordeaux	Loan →	Winter	2017	Free	apoelfc.com.cy
6	CM	(Netherlands)	Lorenzo Ebecilio	25	EU	(Russia) Anzhi Makhachkala	Transfer ✓	Winter	2019	Free	apoelfc.com.cy
80	DM	(Colombia)	Roger Cañas	26	Non-EU	(Kazakhstan) Astana	Loan →	Winter	2017	Free	apoelfc.com.cy

Total expenditure: ▼€140K

Out:

No.	Pos.	Nat.	Name	Age	EU	Moving to	Type	Transfer window	Transfer fee	Source
79	CF	(Argentina)	Fernando Cavenaghi	32	EU	Retirement	Mutual consent; / Retirement; w; =S		Free	apoelfc.com.cy
88	GK	(Cyprus)	Anastasios Kissas	28	EU	(Cyprus) Apollon Limassol	Mutual consent ✗	Summer	Free	apoelfc.com.cy
10	RM	(Cyprus)	Constantinos Charalambides	34	EU	(Cyprus) AEK Larnaca	End of contract ✗	Summer	Free	aek.com.cy
15	LB	(Cyprus)	Marios Antoniades	26	EU	(Greece) Panionios	End of contract ✗	Summer	Free	panioniosfc.gr
95	DM	(Cyprus)	Christos Djamas	20	EU	(Cyprus) Othellos Athienou	End of contract ✗	Summer	Free	goal.com.cy
14	RW	(Cyprus)	Alex Konstantinou	24	EU	(Cyprus) Nea Salamina	Mutual consent ✗	Summer	Free	apoelfc.com.cy
40	CM	(Cyprus)	Demetris Charalambous	19	EU	(Cyprus) THOI Lakatamia	Mutual consent ✗	Summer	Free	apoelfc.com.cy
96	GK	(Cyprus)	Giorgos Tasouris	20	EU	(Cyprus) Ethnikos Assia	Mutual consent ✗	Summer	Free	apoelfc.com.cy
3	CB	(Brazil)	João Guilherme	30	Non-EU	(Saudi Arabia) Al-Fateh	Mutual consent ✗	Summer	Free	apoelfc.com.cy
22	RB	(Cyprus)	Paris Psaltis	19	EU	(Cyprus) Ermis Aradippou	Loan →	Summer	Free	ermisfc.com.cy
1	GK	(Spain)	Jordi Codina	34	EU	(Spain) Reus Deportiu	Mutual consent ✗	Summer	Free	sigmalive.com
45	AM	(Cyprus)	Georgios Christodoulou	18	EU	(Cyprus) Anagennisi Deryneia	Loan →	Summer	Free	sport-fm.com.cy
13	RW	(Portugal)	Carlitos	23	EU	(Cyprus) Anorthosis	Transfer ✓	Summer	€100K	apoelfc.com.cy
—	CB	(Cyprus)	Christos Kallis	18	EU	(Cyprus) Alki Oroklini	Loan →	Summer	Free	sport-fm.com.cy
25	CB	(Cyprus)	Rafael Anastasiou	19	EU	(Cyprus) Anagennisi Deryneia	Loan →	Summer	Free	sigmalive.com
55	CM	(Portugal)	Estrela	20	EU	(Portugal) Varzim	Mutual consent ✗	Summer	Free	apoelfc.com.cy
10	AM	(Argentina)	Tomás De Vincenti	27	EU	(United Arab Emirates) Al Shabab	Transfer ✓	Summer	€2M	apoelfc.com.cy
33	LB	(Greece)	Kyriakos Aretas	19	EU	(Cyprus) Doxa Katokopias	Loan →	Summer	Free	apoelfc.com.cy
17	AM	(Bosnia and Herzegovina)	Semir Štilić	28	Non-EU	Retirement	Mutual consent ✗	Summer	Free	apoelfc.com.cy
28	RB	(Portugal)	Mário Sérgio	35	EU	(Cyprus) Apollon Limassol	Mutual consent ✗	Winter	Free	sport-fm.com.cy
14	CM	(Albania)	Qazim Laçi	20	Non-EU	(Greece) Olympiacos	Loan termination →	Winter	Free	apoelfc.com.cy
27	CF	(Poland)	Mateusz Piątkowski	32	EU	(Poland) Wisła Płock	Contract termination ✗	Winter	Free	apoelfcofficial
88	AM	(Belarus)	Renan Bressan	28	EU	(Portugal) Chaves	Mutual consent ✗	Winter	Free	apoelfcofficial
5	CB	(Brazil)	Carlão	30	Non-EU	(Italy) Torino	Transfer ✓	Winter	€500K	apoelfc.com.cy
8	AM	(Spain)	Andrea Orlandi	32	EU	(Italy) Novara	Contract termination ✗	Winter	Free	apoelfc.com.cy

Total income: ▲€1,8M

Last updated: 1 February 2017

== Club ==
=== Management ===
Position	Staff
Head coach	(Spain) Thomas Christiansen
Assistant coach	(Spain) Julio Bañuelos
Assistant coach/Analyst	(Greece) Georgios Kostis
Goalkeeper coach	(Serbia) Dragoslav Jevrić
Fitness coach	(Spain) Ivan Torres Abad
Assistant fitness coach	(Cyprus) Christos Sotiriou
Team doctor	(Greece) Nikolaos Tzouroudis
Football director	(Serbia) Svetozar Šapurić

Last updated: 14 June 2016
Source: apoelfc.com.cy

=== Kit ===
Supplier: Nike
Sponsor(s): Pari-Match, 3CX, DIMCO

Home	Away	Third

Source: apoelfc.com.cy

=== Other information ===
Chairman	(Cyprus) Prodromos Petrides
Ground (capacity and dimensions)	GSP Stadium (22,859 / 105x68 m)

Source: apoelfc.com.cy, apoelfc.com.cy

== Squad stats ==
				Total						Cypriot First Division					Cypriot Cup					Cypriot Super Cup					Champions League & Europa League				
Country	N	P	Name	GS	A	Mins.	Gls.	Y	R	A	Mins.	Gls.	Y	R	A	Mins.	Gls.	Y	R	A	Mins.	Gls.	Y	R	A	Mins.	Gls.	Y	R
(Cyprus)	2	RB	Christoforou	3	3	257				2	167				1	90													
(Spain)	3	LB	Lago	25	28	2233		2		17	1350		1		4	293									7	590		1	
(Cyprus)	4	DM	Artymatas	14	24	1412	1	2		15	912		2		4	253	1								5	247			
(Brazil)	5	CB	Carlão	27	27	2300		7		15	1305		5												12	995		2	
(Netherlands)	6	CM	Ebecilio	7	13	488	2	2		8	261	2	1		2	84									3	143		1	
(Cyprus)	7	RM	Efrem	32	44	2741	13	7		25	1561	8	3		3	178		1		1	19	1			15	983	4	3	
(Spain)	8	AM	Orlandi	7	19	783	1	2		9	340				1	28	1			1	90				8	325		2	
(Belgium)	9	CF	De Camargo	20	47	2107	13	4		27	1232	10	2		7	422	1	1		1	90				12	363	2	1	
(Argentina)	10	AM	De Vincenti	3	3	270	2	1																	3	270	2	1	
(Argentina)	10	AM	Bertoglio	21	37	1831	6	5		26	1335	5	5		4	143	1								7	353			
(Cyprus)	11	LM	Alexandrou	22	23	1971	1	2		12	994		1		3	258				1	90				7	629	1	1	
(Albania)	14	CM	Laçi																										
(Brazil)	16	CM	Vinícius	42	46	3669	8	4		27	2179	6	2		5	314	1	1							14	1176	1	1	
(Spain)	17	CF	Barral	10	18	1042	5	2		12	600	3	1		3	214	2								3	228		1	
(Cyprus)	19	CF	Charalambous																										
(Cyprus)	20	CF	Sotiriou	51	53	4306	27	8	1	32	2623	21	4		5	397	1			1	32				15	1254	5	4	1
(Bulgaria)	21	RB	Milanov	48	49	4301		10		27	2430		7		5	426		1		1	90				16	1355		2	
(Spain)	23	CB	Astiz	41	45	3563	3	6	1	27	2284	2	4		3	195	1			1	90				14	994		2	1
(Portugal)	26	DM	Morais	55	56	4913	3	9		33	2888	3	4		7	585		1		1	90				15	1350		4	
(Portugal)	28	RB	Mário Sérgio	2	3	176				2	91														1	85			
(Cyprus)	30	CB	Merkis	29	33	2686	2	7		20	1631	2	4		4	360				1	70				8	625		3	
(Cyprus)	31	AM	Papafotis	2	5	199				3	95				2	104													
(Cyprus)	35	CB	Adoni		1	45									1	45													
(Cyprus)	44	CB	Ioannou	27	28	2381		7		17	1530		4		6	471		1		1	20		1		4	360		1	
(Cyprus)	46	LW	Aloneftis	21	39	1942	6	1		28	1369	4			6	358	2								5	215		1	
(Greece)	70	RW	Gianniotas	35	49	3028	8	12		29	1581	5	7		5	391		3		1	90				14	966	3	2	
(Brazil)	77	LW	Vander	28	46	2535	5	10	1	28	1698	3	5		4	195	1	2	1	1	71				13	571	1	3	
(Spain)	78	GK	Pardo	10	10	855	-8	1		2	180	-2			7	585	-4	1		1	90	-2							
(Colombia)	80	DM	Cañas	14	15	1252	1	2		13	1072	1	2		2	180													
(Belarus)	88	AM	Bressan	5	12	528	1	1		7	352	1	1							1	58				4	118			
(Central African Republic)	90	CB	Yambéré	9	12	889	1	3		7	496	1			3	270		2							2	123		1	
(Cyprus)	98	GK	Paraskevas																										
(Netherlands)	99	GK	Waterman	50	51	4545	-37	1		34	3060	-22	1		1	45									16	1440	-15		

Last updated: 24 May 2017
Source: Match reports in competitive matches
Ordered by start team, game starts and position on pitch (from back right to front left)
0 shown as blank
Country: when 2 flags, 1st flag = country that plays for internationally, 2nd flag = country of birth; N = number on jersey; P = Position; Name = Name on jersey (for more extended name, pause the mouse pointer on the name); GS = Game Started; A = Appearances.

=== Top scorers ===
R	Player	Position	League	Cup	Super Cup	Europe^{1}	Total
1	(Cyprus) Sotiriou	CF	21	1	0	5	27
2	(Belgium) De Camargo	CF	10	1	0	2	13
2	(Cyprus) Efrem	RM	8	0	1	4	13
4	(Brazil) Vinícius	CM	6	1	0	1	8
4	(Greece) Gianniotas	RW	5	0	0	3	8
6	(Argentina) Bertoglio	AM	5	1	0	0	6
6	(Cyprus) Aloneftis	LW	4	2	0	0	6
8	(Spain) Barral	CF	3	2	0	0	5
8	(Brazil) Vander	LW	3	1	0	1	5
10	(Portugal) Morais	DM	3	0	0	0	3
10	(Spain) Astiz	CB	2	1	0	0	3
12	(Netherlands) Ebecilio	CM	2	0	0	0	2
12	(Cyprus) Merkis	CB	2	0	0	0	2
12	(Argentina) De Vincenti	AM	0	0	0	2	2
15	(Colombia) Cañas	DM	1	0	0	0	1
15	(Central African Republic) Yambéré	CB	1	0	0	0	1
15	(Belarus) Bressan	AM	1	0	0	0	1
15	(Cyprus) Alexandrou	LM	0	0	0	1	1
15	(Cyprus) Artymatas	DM	0	1	0	0	1
15	(Spain) Orlandi	AM	0	1	0	0	1
Own goals			0	0	0	1	1
TOTAL			77	12	1	20	110

Last updated: 24 May 2017
^{1}Includes UEFA Champions League & Europa League matches.
Source: Match reports in Competitive matches

=== Captains ===
1. (Cyprus) Nektarios Alexandrou
2. (Portugal) Nuno Morais
3. (Spain) Urko Pardo
4. (Cyprus) Efstathios Aloneftis
5. (Cyprus) Pieros Sotiriou

== Pre-season friendlies ==
20 June 2016 Friendly	APOEL (Cyprus)	2–2	(Lithuania) FK Atlantas	Arena Mistrzów, Gniewino
18:30 EET	De Vincenti 8' (pen.); Vinícius 47'	Report	Gedminas 49'; Papšys 68'

23 June 2016 Friendly	APOEL (Cyprus)	1–0	(Serbia) FK Partizan	Arena Mistrzów, Gniewino
18:30 EET	De Vincenti 71' (pen.)	Report		Referee: (Poland) Damian Kos

26 June 2016 Friendly	Lechia Gdańsk (Poland)	2–1	(Cyprus) APOEL	Arena Mistrzów, Gniewino
18:00 EET	Mila 51', 70'	Report	De Vincenti 43'	Attendance: 200

29 June 2016 Friendly	APOEL (Cyprus)	1–1	(Romania) Viitorul Constanța	Arena Mistrzów, Gniewino
18:30 EET	Vander 73'	Report	Sérgio 48' (o.g.)

5 July 2016 Friendly	APOEL (Cyprus)	2–1	(Greece) PAS Giannina	Dasaki Stadium, Achna
20:00 EET	Sotiriou 3', 13'	Report	Ferfelis 4'	Attendance: 1,000; Referee: (Cyprus) Leontios Trattou

21 July 2016 Friendly	Doxa Katokopias (Cyprus)	1–4	(Cyprus) APOEL	THOI Lakatamia Stadium, Lakatamia
19:00 EET	Peralta 25'	Report	Bressan 37'; Orlandi 45'; Merkis 53'; De Camargo 78' (pen.)	Attendance: 800; Referee: Vasilis Demetriou

29 July 2016 Friendly	AEZ Zakakiou (Cyprus)	0–3	(Cyprus) APOEL	Dasaki Stadium, Achna
19:45 EET		Report	Orlandi 20'; De Camargo 35'; De Vincenti 77' (pen.)	Attendance: 300; Referee: (Cyprus) Christos N. Christou

5 August 2016 Friendly	Ethnikos Achna (Cyprus)	0–0	(Cyprus) APOEL	THOI Lakatamia Stadium, Lakatamia
19:00 EET		Report		Attendance: 300; Referee: Nicolas Neocleous

== Competitions ==
=== Overall ===
Competition	Started round	Final position / round	First match	Last match
Cypriot First Division	—	Winners	28 August 2016	20 May 2017
UEFA Champions League	Second qualifying round	Play-off round	12 July 2016	24 August 2016
UEFA Europa League	Group stage	Round of 16	15 September 2016	16 March 2017
Cypriot Cup	Second round	Runners-up	18 January 2017	24 May 2017
Cypriot Super Cup	Final	Runners-up	10 August 2016	

Updated to match played 24 May 2017
Source: Competitions

=== Cypriot First Division ===
==== League table ====
Pos	Team	Pld	W	D	L	GF	GA	GD	Pts	Qualification or relegation
1	APOEL	26	19	5	2	62	16	+46	62	Qualification for the championship round
2	AEK Larnaca	26	17	7	2	54	19	+35	58	Qualification for the championship round
3	Apollon Limassol	26	17	6	3	56	19	+37	57	Qualification for the championship round
4	AEL Limassol	26	15	6	5	40	22	+18	51	Qualification for the championship round
5	Omonia	26	15	5	6	56	37	+19	50	Qualification for the championship round

Source: CFA (in Greek), UEFA, Soccerway
Rules for classification: 1) Points; 2) Head-to-head points; 3) Head-to-head goal difference; 4) Head-to-head goals scored; 5) Head-to-head away goals scored (only if two teams); 6) Goal difference; 7) Goals scored; 8) Play-off (only if deciding championship round, relegation round or relegation).

==== Results summary ====
Overall								Home						Away					
Pld	W	D	L	GF	GA	GD	Pts	W	D	L	GF	GA	GD	W	D	L	GF	GA	GD
36	24	8	4	77	24	+53	80	13	5	0	41	8	+33	11	3	4	36	16	+20

Last updated: 20 May 2017.
Source: UEFA

==== Results by round ====
Round	1	2	3	4	5	6	7	8	9	10	11	12	13	14	15	16	17	18	19	20	21	22	23	24	25	26	27	28	29	30	31	32	33	34	35	36
Ground	A	H	A	H	A	H	A	H	A	H	A	H	A	H	A	H	A	H	A	H	A	H	A	H	A	H	A	H	A	H	A	H	A	H	A	H
Result	D	W	W	W	W	W	W	W	D	W	L	D	W	W	D	W	W	W	W	W	W	D	W	W	L	W	W	W	L	W	L	D	W	D	W	D
Position	8	3	2	2	2	2	2	2	2	2	2	3	3	3	3	3	2	1	1	1	1	1	1	1	1	1	1	1	1	1	1	1	1	1	1	1

Updated to match(es) played on 20 May 2017. Source: apoelfc.com.cy
A = Away; H = Home; W = Win; D = Draw; L = Loss

=== Play-offs table ===
The first 12 of the 14 teams are divided into two groups of six teams. Points are carried over from the regular season.

==== Championship group ====
Pos	Team	Pld	W	D	L	GF	GA	GD	Pts	Qualification
1	APOEL (C)	36	24	8	4	77	24	+53	80	Qualification for the Champions League second qualifying round
2	AEK Larnaca	36	22	10	4	66	28	+38	76	Qualification for the Europa League first qualifying round
3	Apollon Limassol	36	21	10	5	71	30	+41	73	Qualification for the Europa League second qualifying round (Note: Apollon Limassol qualified for the Europa League second qualifying round by winning the 2016–17 Cypriot Cup.)
4	AEL Limassol	36	19	9	8	53	36	+17	66	Qualification for the Europa League first qualifying round
5	Omonia	36	17	6	13	68	57	+11	57	

Source: CFA (in Greek), UEFA, Soccerway
Rules for classification: 1) Points; 2) Head-to-head points; 3) Head-to-head goal difference; 4) Head-to-head goals scored; 5) Head-to-head away goals scored (only if two teams); 6) Goal difference; 7) Goals scored; 8) Play-off (only if deciding champion or UEFA competitions).
(C) Champions

==== Matches ====
Kick-off times are in EET.

==== Regular season ====
21 September 2016 (Note: The match between Anorthosis and APOEL was originally scheduled on 20 August 2016, but was postponed and rescheduled to a later date because of APOEL's UEFA Champions League play-off matches against FC Copenhagen.) Matchweek 1	Anorthosis	0–0	APOEL	Antonis Papadopoulos, Larnaca
18:00 EET		Report 1 Report 2		Attendance: 7,000; Referee: Christos Nicolaides

28 August 2016 Matchweek 2	APOEL	3–0	Ermis	GSP Stadium, Nicosia
20:00 EET	Morais 39'; Gianniotas 80'; Efrem 90+4'	Report 1 Report 2		Attendance: 5,538; Referee: Avraam Tsoukkas

10 September 2016 Matchweek 3	Nea Salamina	0–4	APOEL	Ammochostos Stadium, Larnaca
20:00 EET		Report 1 Report 2	Sotiriou 27', 79'; De Camargo 84'; Efrem 90'	Attendance: 2,700; Referee: Giorgos Nicolaou

18 September 2016 Matchweek 4	APOEL	2–1	Anagennisi	GSP Stadium, Nicosia
18:00 EET	De Camargo 58'; Vander 78'	Report 1 Report 2		Attendance: 5,635; Referee: Charalambos Skapoullis

25 September 2016 Matchweek 5	Aris	0–3	APOEL	Tsirion Stadium, Limassol
19:00 EET		Report 1 Report 2	Gianniotas 45'; Vinícius 59'; Merkis 79'	Attendance: 1,500; Referee: Neophytos Neophytou

2 October 2016 Matchweek 6	APOEL	2–0	Doxa	GSP Stadium, Nicosia
20:00 EET	Efrem 83'; Gianniotas 89'	Report 1 Report 2		Attendance: 5,194; Referee: Nicolas Athanasiou

15 October 2016 Matchweek 7	AEZ	1–4	APOEL	Pafiako Stadium, Paphos
18:00 EET	Pangalos 90'	Report 1 Report 2	Bertoglio 8'; Sotiriou 21'; Efrem 76', 83'	Attendance: 2,000; Referee: Andreas Orthodoxou

24 October 2016 Matchweek 8	APOEL	2–0	Ethnikos	GSP Stadium, Nicosia
19:00 EET	Sotiriou 56', 75'	Report 1 Report 2		Attendance: 4,870; Referee: Avraam Tsoukkas

29 October 2016 Matchweek 9	AEK	1–1	APOEL	AEK Arena, Larnaca
20:00 EET	Alves 66'	Report 1 Report 2	Vinícius 60'	Attendance: 6,000; Referee: Demetris Masias

6 November 2016 Matchweek 10	APOEL	4–1	Karmiotissa	GSP Stadium, Nicosia
18:00 EET	Sotiriou 13', 55'; Aloneftis 73'; Bressan 90'	Report 1 Report 2	Poljanec 36'; Adamović (yellow card) 58' (yellow-red card)	Attendance: 5,378; Referee: Leontios Trattou

19 November 2016 Matchweek 11	AEL	1–0	APOEL	Tsirion Stadium, Limassol
19:00 EET	Arruabarrena 86' (pen.)	Report 1 Report 2		Attendance: 5,145; Referee: Vassilis Demetriou

28 November 2016 Matchweek 12	APOEL	1–1	Apollon	GSP Stadium, Nicosia
19:00 EET	Bertoglio 90+5'	Report 1 Report 2	Da Silva 65' (pen.)	Attendance: 7,059; Referee: Demetris Masias

3 December 2016 Matchweek 13	Omonia	1–4	APOEL	GSP Stadium, Nicosia
17:00 EET	Carlitos (red card) 18'; Margaça 54'	Report 1 Report 2	Efrem 18' (pen.); Sotiriou 34', 38'; Vinícius 67'	Attendance: 11,963; Referee: Giorgos Nicolaou

12 December 2016 Matchweek 14	APOEL	2–1	Anorthosis	GSP Stadium, Nicosia
19:00 EET	De Camargo 41'; Astiz 89'	Report 1 Report 2	Gonçalves 90+1'	Attendance: 7,256; Referee: Loucas Soteriou

17 December 2016 Matchweek 15	Ermis	1–1	APOEL	Antonis Papadopoulos, Larnaca
18:00 EET	Mashinya 9'	Report 1 Report 2	Bertoglio 78'	Attendance: 1,500; Referee: Leontios Trattou

21 December 2016 Matchweek 16	APOEL	1–0	Nea Salamina	GSP Stadium, Nicosia
19:00 EET	De Camargo 47'	Report 1 Report 2		Attendance: 3,703; Referee: Christos Nicolaides

3 January 2017 Matchweek 17	Anagennisi	2–4	APOEL	Tasos Markou Stadium, Paralimni
18:00 EET	Wesllem 70'; Brígido 71'	Report 1 Report 2	Aloneftis 10'; Vinícius 17', 60'; Gianniotas 73'	Attendance: 1,000; Referee: Giorgos Nicolaou

8 January 2017 Matchweek 18	APOEL	5–0	Aris	GSP Stadium, Nicosia
17:00 EET	Sotiriou 24', 28', 54' (pen.); Efrem 37', 89'	Report 1 Report 2		Attendance: 3,608; Referee: Nicolas Athanasiou

14 January 2017 Matchweek 19	Doxa	0–2	APOEL	Makario Stadium, Nicosia
17:00 EET		Report 1 Report 2	De Camargo 32'; Sotiriou 79'	Attendance: 1,467; Referee: Andreas Orthodoxou

22 January 2017 Matchweek 20	APOEL	7–0	AEZ	GSP Stadium, Nicosia
17:00 EET	Aloneftis 5'; Barral 7', 45'; Sotiriou 11'; Merkis 15'; De Camargo 70', 85'	Report 1 Report 2		Attendance: 5,015; Referee: Neophytos Neophytou

29 January 2017 Matchweek 21	Ethnikos	2–3	APOEL	Dasaki Stadium, Achna
16:00 EET	Chadjivasilis 13'; Pincelli 90+5' (pen.)	Report 1 Report 2	De Camargo 23'; Astiz 38'; Gianniotas 78'	Attendance: 2,000; Referee: Christos Nicolaides

5 February 2017 Matchweek 22	APOEL	1–1	AEK	GSP Stadium, Nicosia
16:00 EET	Sotiriou 75'	Report 1 Report 2	Taulemesse 36'	Attendance: 11,262; Referee: Loucas Soteriou

11 February 2017 Matchweek 23	Karmiotissa	0–1	APOEL	GSZ Stadium, Larnaca
19:00 EET	Stavrou (red card) 90+3'	Report 1 Report 2	Bertoglio 5'	Attendance: 700; Referee: Costas Psevdiotis

20 February 2017 Matchweek 24	APOEL	3–0	AEL	GSP Stadium, Nicosia
19:00 EET	Vinícius 34'; Morais 68'; De Camargo 90+4' (pen.)	Report 1 Report 2		Attendance: 7,826; Referee: Christos Nicolaides

27 February 2017 Matchweek 25	Apollon	2–0	APOEL	Tsirion Stadium, Limassol
19:00 EET	Maglica 43'; João Pedro 90+6'	Report 1 Report 2		Attendance: 7,000; Referee: Vassilis Demetriou

4 March 2017 Matchweek 26	APOEL	2–1	Omonia	GSP Stadium, Nicosia
17:00 EET	Sotiriou 44' (pen.); Barral 45+2' (pen.)	Report 1 Report 2	Derbyshire 87'	Attendance: 10,184; Referee: Demetris Masias

==== Play-offs ====
12 March 2017 Matchweek 1	Anorthosis	0–1	APOEL	Antonis Papadopoulos, Larnaca
18:00 EET		Report 1 Report 2	Sotiriou 8'	Attendance: 5,000; Referee: Ioannis Anastasiou

20 March 2017 Matchweek 2	APOEL	2–0	AEL	GSP Stadium, Nicosia
19:00 EET	Sotiriou 45+4' (pen.); Cañas 48'	Report 1 Report 2		Attendance: 5,783; Referee: Loucas Soteriou

1 April 2017 Matchweek 3	AEK	2–1	APOEL	AEK Arena, Larnaca
19:00 EET	Mitidis 81'; Larena 90+3'	Report 1 Report 2	Morais 8'	Attendance: 4,000; Referee: Demetris Masias

9 April 2017 Matchweek 4	APOEL	1–0	Omonia	GSP Stadium, Nicosia
16:00 EET	Ebecilio 4'	Report 1 Report 2		Attendance: 10,147; Referee: Christos Nicolaides

13 April 2017 Matchweek 5	Apollon	1–0	APOEL	Tsirion Stadium, Limassol
16:00 EET	Papoulis 41'	Report 1 Report 2		Attendance: 4,500; Referee: Loucas Soteriou

23 April 2017 Matchweek 6	APOEL	1–1	Anorthosis	GSP Stadium, Nicosia
16:00 EET	Yambéré 87'	Report 1 Report 2	Calderón 36'	Attendance: 6,378; Referee: Neophytos Neophytou

30 April 2017 Matchweek 7	AEL	1–4	APOEL	Tsirion Stadium, Limassol
18:00 EET	Mitrea 88' (pen.)	Report 1 Report 2	Vander 17'; Ebecilio 45+1'; Sotiriou 76', 89'	Attendance: 3,500; Referee: Ioannis Anastasiou

7 May 2017 Matchweek 8	APOEL	0–0	AEK	GSP Stadium, Nicosia
19:00 EET		Report 1 Report 2		Attendance: 15,462; Referee: Giorgos Nicolaou

13 May 2017 Matchweek 9	Omonia	1–3	APOEL	GSP Stadium, Nicosia
18:00 EET	Derbyshire 9'; Breeveld (yellow card) (yellow-red card) 85'	Report 1 Report 2	Aloneftis 37'; Sotiriou 65' (pen.); Vander 90+2'	Attendance: 6,233; Referee: Vassilis Demetriou

20 May 2017 Matchweek 10	APOEL	2–2	Apollon	GSP Stadium, Nicosia
19:00 EET	Bertoglio 78'; De Camargo 90'	Report 1 Report 2	Piech 52'; Pittas 86'	Attendance: 7,457; Referee: Neophytos Neophytou

=== UEFA Champions League ===
==== Qualifying phase ====
===== Second qualifying round =====
12 July 2016 First Leg	The New Saints (Wales)	0–0	(Cyprus) APOEL	Park Hall, Oswestry
20:00 CET		Report 1 Report 2		Attendance: 1,056; Referee: (Portugal) Hugo Miguel

19 July 2016 Second Leg	APOEL (Cyprus)	3–0 (3–0 agg.)	(Wales) The New Saints	GSP Stadium, Nicosia
19:00 CET	Alexandrou 54'; Sotiriou 73'; De Vincenti 90+5' (pen.)	Report 1 Report 2		Attendance: 10,606; Referee: (Montenegro) Nikola Dabanović

===== Third qualifying round =====
27 July 2016 First Leg	Rosenborg (Norway)	2–1	(Cyprus) APOEL	Lerkendal Stadion, Trondheim
19:15 CET	Gytkjær 23'; Skjelvik 45+1'	Report 1 Report 2	Efrem 67'	Attendance: 13,281; Referee: (Slovenia) Slavko Vinčić

2 August 2016 Second Leg	APOEL (Cyprus)	3–0 (4–2 agg.)	(Norway) Rosenborg	GSP Stadium, Nicosia
19:00 CET	Gianniotas 90+1'; Vander 90+6'; De Vincenti 90+9'	Report 1 Report 2		Attendance: 15,685; Referee: (Poland) Paweł Raczkowski

===== Play-off round =====
16 August 2016 First Leg	Copenhagen (Denmark)	1–0	(Cyprus) APOEL	Telia Parken, Copenhagen
20:45 CET	Pavlović 43'	Report 1 Report 2		Attendance: 20,519; Referee: (Czech Republic) Pavel Královec

24 August 2016 Second Leg	APOEL (Cyprus)	1–1 (1–2 agg.)	(Denmark) Copenhagen	GSP Stadium, Nicosia
20:45 CET	Sotiriou 69'	Report 1 Report 2	Santander 86'	Attendance: 17,310; Referee: (Italy) Gianluca Rocchi

=== UEFA Europa League ===
==== Group stage ====
Pos	Team	Pld	W	D	L	GF	GA	GD	Pts	Qualification	APO	OLY	YB	AST
1	(Cyprus) APOEL	6	4	0	2	8	6	+2	12	Advance to knockout phase	—	2–0	1–0	2–1
2	(Greece) Olympiacos	6	2	2	2	7	6	+1	8	Advance to knockout phase	0–1	—	1–1	4–1
3	(Switzerland) Young Boys	6	2	2	2	7	4	+3	8		3–1	0–1	—	3–0
4	(Kazakhstan) Astana	6	1	2	3	5	11	−6	5		2–1	1–1	0–0	—

Source: UEFA
Rules for classification: Group stage tiebreakers

===== Matches =====
15 September 2016 Matchweek 1	APOEL (Cyprus)	2–1	(Kazakhstan) Astana	GSP Stadium, Nicosia
19:00 CET	Vinícius 75'; De Camargo 87'	Report 1 Report 2	Maksimović 45+1'	Attendance: 12,021; Referee: (North Macedonia) Aleksandar Stavrev

29 September 2016 Matchweek 2	Olympiacos (Greece)	0–1	(Cyprus) APOEL	Karaiskakis Stadium, Piraeus
21:05 CET		Report 1 Report 2	Sotiriou 10'	Attendance: 24,378; Referee: (Poland) Paweł Gil

20 October 2016 Matchweek 3	Young Boys (Switzerland)	3–1	(Cyprus) APOEL	Stade de Suisse, Bern
21:05 CET	Hoarau 18', 52', 82' (pen.)	Report 1 Report 2	Efrem 14'	Attendance: 9,553; Referee: (Germany) Tobias Welz

3 November 2016 Matchweek 4	APOEL (Cyprus)	1–0	(Switzerland) Young Boys	GSP Stadium, Nicosia
19:00 CET	Sotiriou 69'	Report 1 Report 2	Mbabu (red card) 67'	Attendance: 12,763; Referee: (Belgium) Sébastien Delferiere

24 November 2016 Matchweek 5	Astana (Kazakhstan)	2–1	(Cyprus) APOEL	Astana Arena, Astana
17:00 CET	Aničić 59'; Despotović 84'	Report 1 Report 2	Efrem 31'; Astiz (red card) 33'	Attendance: 9,143; Referee: (Netherlands) Kevin Blom

8 December 2016 Matchweek 6	APOEL (Cyprus)	2–0	(Greece) Olympiacos	GSP Stadium, Nicosia
19:00 CET	Da Costa 19' (o.g.); De Camargo 83'	Report 1 Report 2		Attendance: 14,779; Referee: (Spain) Carlos del Cerro Grande

==== Round of 32 ====
16 February 2017 First Leg	Athletic Bilbao (Spain)	3–2	(Cyprus) APOEL	San Mamés, Bilbao
21:05 CET	Merkis 38' (o.g.); Aduriz 61'; Williams 72'	Report 1 Report 2	Efrem 36'; Gianniotas 89'	Attendance: 32,675; Referee: (Sweden) Jonas Eriksson

23 February 2017 Second Leg	APOEL (Cyprus)	2–0 (4–3 agg.)	(Spain) Athletic Bilbao	GSP Stadium, Nicosia
19:00 CET	Sotiriou 46', (red card) 65'; Gianniotas 54' (pen.)	Report 1 Report 2	Iturraspe (yellow card) 90' (yellow-red card)	Attendance: 15,275; Referee: (Russia) Vladislav Bezborodov

==== Round of 16 ====
9 March 2017 First Leg	APOEL (Cyprus)	0–1	(Belgium) Anderlecht	GSP Stadium, Nicosia
19:00 CET		Report 1 Report 2	Stanciu 29'	Attendance: 19,327; Referee: (Portugal) Jorge Sousa

16 March 2017 Second Leg	Anderlecht (Belgium)	1–0 (2–0 agg.)	(Cyprus) APOEL	Constant Vanden Stock, Anderlecht
21:05 CET	Acheampong 65'	Report 1 Report 2		Attendance: 15,662; Referee: (Belarus) Aleksei Kulbakov

=== Cypriot Super Cup ===
10 August 2016 Final	APOEL	1–2	Apollon	GSP Stadium, Nicosia
20:00 EET	Efrem 90+3'	Report 1 Report 2	Maglica 39'; Piech 80'	Attendance: 3,506; Referee: Vassilis Demetriou

=== Cypriot Cup ===
==== Second round ====
18 January 2017 First Leg	APOEL	2–1	Nea Salamina	GSP Stadium, Nicosia
19:00 EET	Vander 69'; Orlandi 74'	Report 1 Report 2	Kolokoudias 25' (pen.)	Attendance: 3,851; Referee: Costas Psevdiotis

25 January 2017 Second Leg	Nea Salamina	1–2 (2–4 agg.)	APOEL	Ammochostos Stadium, Larnaca
18:00 EET	Makriev 81'	Report 1 Report 2	Sotiriou 9'; Aloneftis 70'	Attendance: 1,500; Referee: Ioannis Anastasiou

==== Quarter-finals ====
5 April 2017 First Leg	APOEL	0–0	AEL	GSP Stadium, Nicosia
18:00 EET		Report 1 Report 2		Attendance: 921; Referee: Giorgos Nicolaou

19 April 2017 Second Leg	AEL	1–1 (1–1 (a) agg.)	APOEL	Tsirion Stadium, Limassol
18:00 EET	Arruabarrena 81', (red card) 90+2'	Report 1 Report 2	Vander (yellow card) (yellow-red card) 44'; Barral 51'	Attendance: 3,108; Referee: Costas Psevdiotis

==== Semi-finals ====
26 April 2017 First Leg	Doxa	0–2	APOEL	Makario Stadium, Nicosia
17:00 EET		Report 1 Report 2	Barral 45+1'; Astiz 62'	Attendance: 1,200; Referee: Demetris Masias

3 May 2017 Second Leg	APOEL	5–0 (7–0 agg.)	Doxa	GSP Stadium, Nicosia
18:00 EET	Aloneftis 13'; Artymatas 22'; Bertoglio 42'; De Camargo 71'; Vinícius 80'	Report 1 Report 2		Attendance: 2,717; Referee: Charalambos Skapoullis

==== Final ====
24 May 2017 Final	APOEL	0–1	Apollon	GSP Stadium, Nicosia
18:30 EET		Report 1 Report 2	Alex da Silva (yellow card) (yellow-red card) 62'; Vinícius 79'	Attendance: 13,906; Referee: Loucas Soteriou
