= 2016–17 Cypriot Cup =

Tournament details
- Country: Cyprus
- Dates: 26 October 2016 – 24 May 2017
- Teams: 25

Final positions
- Champions: Apollon (9th title)
- Runners-up: APOEL

Tournament statistics
- Matches played: 38
- Goals scored: 117 (3.08 per match)
- Top goal scorer(s): Ivan Tričkovski (4 goals)
- All statistics correct as of 24 May 2017.

The 2016–17 Cypriot Cup was the 75th edition of the Cypriot Cup. A total of 25 clubs were accepted to enter the competition. It began on 26 October 2016 with the first round and concluded on 24 May 2017 with the final held at GSP Stadium. The winner of the Cup was Apollon Limassol for ninth time and qualified for the 2017–18 Europa League second qualifying round

== First round ==
The first round draw took place on 19 October 2016 and the matches played on 26 October and 2, 23, 30 November 2016.

26 October 2016	Aris Limassol	6−0	Akritas Chlorakas	Tsirion Stadium, Limassol
15:00 EET	González 34', 57' (pen.), 74'; Rogério 38'; Onyilo 61', 81'	Report		Attendance: 43; Referee: Andreas Argyrou

26 October 2016	Enosis Neon Paralimni	2−4	AEZ Zakakiou	Tasos Markou, Paralimni
15:00 EET	Moushis 18'; Cojocnean 20'	Report	Di Franco 16'; Villafañe 40'; Semedo 56'; Pittaras 59'	Attendance: 200; Referee: Constantinos Fotiou

26 October 2016	Karmiotissa	3−1	Ayia Napa	GSZ Stadium, Larnaca
15:00 EET	Pantos 18' (pen.), 67'; Papadopoulos 50'	Report	Markou 87'	Attendance: 100; Referee: Timotheos Christofi

26 October 2016	Doxa Katokopias	3−2	Ermis Aradippou	Makario Stadium, Nicosia
18:00 EET	Castro 3'; Gonzalez 37'; Peralta 48' (pen.)	Report	Martynyuk 42'; Da Sylva 77'	Attendance: 14; Referee: Ioannis Anastasiou

26 October 2016	Omonia Aradippou	0−3	AEK Larnaca	Ammochostos Stadium, Larnaca
18:00 EET		Report	Boljević 32'; Acorán 59'; Alves 87' (pen.)	Attendance: 500; Referee: Andreas Constantinou

26 October 2016	Anorthosis	2−1 (a.e.t.)	Othellos Athienou	Antonis Papadopoulos, Larnaca
19:00 EET	Airam 50'; Kastanas 94' (o.g.)	Report	Djamas 61'	Attendance: 500; Referee: Kyriakos Christodoulou

2 November 2016	Alki Oroklini	1−2	AEL Limassol	Ammochostos Stadium, Larnaca
18:00 EET	Avraam 45' (pen.)	Report	Arruabarrena 31' (pen.); Georgiadis 81'	Attendance: 400; Referee: Christos Constantinou

23 November 2016	Pafos FC	2−3 (a.e.t.)	Anagennisi Deryneia	Pafiako Stadium, Paphos
17:00 EET	Leonel 87'; Pătulea 112' (pen.)	Report	Brígido 74'; Furtado 101', 107'	Attendance: 150; Referee: Christos Spanos

30 November 2016	Nea Salamina	2−0	PAEEK	Ammochostos Stadium, Larnaca
18:00 EET	Makriev 32'; Tsiamis 33' (o.g.)	Report		Attendance: 200; Referee: Chrysovalantis Theouli

== Second round ==
The second round draw took place on 20 December 2016 and the matches played on 11, 18, 25 January and 1, 8 February 2017.

The following seven teams advanced directly to second round and will meet the nine winners of the first round ties:

- Apollon Limassol (2015–16 Cypriot Cup winner)
- Omonia (2015–16 Cypriot Cup runners-up)
- APOEL (2015–16 Cypriot First Division Fair Play winner)
- ASIL Lysi (Wild card, via draw)
- Ethnikos Achna (Wild card, via draw)
- Ethnikos Assia (Wild card, via draw)
- Olympiakos Nicosia (Wild card, via draw)

Team 1	Agg.	Team 2	1st leg	2nd leg
APOEL	4–1	Nea Salamina	2–1	2–1
Aris Limassol	0–3	AEL Limassol	0–2	0–1
Apollon Limassol	4–0	AEZ Zakakiou	2–0	2–0
Olympiakos Nicosia	5–0	Ethnikos Assia	2–0	3–0
Anorthosis	7–0	ASIL Lysi	2–0	5–0
Doxa Katokopias	5–1	Anagennisi Deryneia	2–1	3–0
AEK Larnaca	8–2	Karmiotissa	2–1	6–1
Omonia	1–1 (a)	Ethnikos Achna	0–0	1–1

=== First leg ===
11 January 2017	Anorthosis	2−0	ASIL Lysi	Antonis Papadopoulos, Larnaca
16:00 EET	Gonçalves 60' (pen.); Carlitos 78'	Report		Attendance: 500; Referee: Demetris Masias

11 January 2017	Olympiakos Nicosia	2−0	Ethnikos Assia	Makario Stadium, Nicosia
17:00 EET	Pechlivanis 21'; Antoniou 45' (pen.)	Report		Attendance: 150; Referee: Savvas Zaphiris

11 January 2017	Omonia	0−0	Ethnikos Achna	GSP Stadium, Nicosia
17:00 EET		Report		Attendance: 3,000; Referee: Vasilis Demetriou

11 January 2017	AEK Larnaca	2−1	Karmiotissa	AEK Arena, Larnaca
18:00 EET	Charalambides 36'; Englezou 41'	Report	Poljanec 56'	Attendance: 1,000; Referee: Avraam Tsoukkas

11 January 2017	Aris Limassol	0−2	AEL Limassol	Tsirion Stadium, Limassol
19:00 EET		Report	Arruabarrena 45+4' (pen.); Piti 84'	Attendance: 1,000; Referee: Christos Nikolaides

18 January 2017	APOEL	2−1	Nea Salamina	GSP Stadium, Nicosia
19:00 EET	Vander 69'; Orlandi 73'	Report	Kolokoudias 24' (pen.)	Attendance: 3,851; Referee: Kostas Psevdiotis

1 February 2017	Apollon Limassol	2−0	AEZ Zakakiou	Tsirion Stadium, Limassol
17:00 EET	Sardinero 60', 90+2'	Report		Attendance: 500; Referee: Timotheos Christofi

1 February 2017	Doxa Katokopias	2−1	Anagennisi Deryneia	Makario Stadium, Nicosia
18:00 EET	Leonardo 38'; Corominas 38', 72'	Report	Wesllem 86'	Attendance: 50; Referee: Avraam Tsoukkas

=== Second leg ===
18 January 2017	Ethnikos Assia	0−3 (0–5 agg.)	Olympiakos Nicosia	Makario Stadium, Nicosia
13:00 EET	Kapartis 1', 53', 57' (pen.)	Report		Attendance: 150; Referee: Andreas Argyrou

18 January 2017	Ethnikos Achna	1−1 (1–1 (a) agg.)	Omonia	Dasaki Stadium, Achna
15:00 EET	Zelaya 57'	Report	Derbyshire 90+1'	Attendance: 1,300; Referee: Loukas Soteriou

18 January 2017	Karmiotissa	1−6 (2–8 agg.)	AEK Larnaca	GSZ Stadium, Larnaca
16:00 EET	Pantos 81'	Report	Tričkovski 18', 39', 41'; Englezou 82', 87'; Truyols 89'	Attendance: 500; Referee: Vasilis Demetriou

25 January 2017	ASIL Lysi	0−5 (0–7 agg.)	Anorthosis	GSZ Stadium, Larnaca
14:00 EET		Report	Colunga 34'; Gonçalves 42'; Santos 67'; Kyriakou 71'; Gabriel 89'	Attendance: 500; Referee: Nikolas Athanasiou

25 January 2017	AEL Limassol	1−0 (3–0 agg.)	Aris Limassol	Tsirion Stadium, Limassol
15:00 EET	Sassi 60'	Report		Attendance: 570; Referee: Giorgos Nikolaou

25 January 2017	Nea Salamina	1−2 (2–4 agg.)	APOEL	Ammochostos Stadium, Larnaca
16:00 EET	Makriev 81'	Report	Sotiriou 9'; Aloneftis 70'	Attendance: 1,500; Referee: Giannis Anastasiou

8 February 2017	Anagennisi Deryneia	0−3 (1–5 agg.)	Doxa Katokopias	Paralimni Stadium, Paralimni
15:00 EET		Report	Kenidy 8'; Braulio 60'; Coro 64'	Attendance: 100; Referee: Kostas Psevdiotis

8 February 2017	AEZ Zakakiou	0−2 (0–4 agg.)	Apollon Limassol	Pafiako Stadium, Paphos
17:00 EET		Report	Antoniou 38' (o.g.); Piech 83'	Attendance: 200; Referee: Leontios Trattou

== Quarter-finals ==
The quarter-finals draw took place on 9 February 2017 and the matches played on 15 and 22 February, 8 March, 5 and 19 April 2017.

}

Team 1	Agg.	Team 2	1st leg	2nd leg
AEK Larnaca	3–5	Anorthosis	1–3	2–2
Olympiakos Nicosia	2–3	Doxa Katokopias	1–1	1–2 (a.e.t.)
APOEL	1–1 (a)	AEL Limassol	0–0	1–1
Omonia	2–5	Apollon Limassol	2–2	0–3 (Note: The original match was abandoned in the 82nd minute while Apollon was leading 3–1 due to crowd trouble, as Omonia fans were repeatedly throwing flares in the pitch. Cyprus Football Association awarded Apollon Limassol a 3–0 win.)

=== First leg ===
15 February 2017	Omonia	2−2	Apollon Limassol	GSP Stadium, Nicosia
16:00 EET	Cleyton 58'; Christofi 63'	Report	Maglica 10'; Alexandre 21' (pen.)	Attendance: 8,000; Referee: Giorgos Nikolaou

22 February 2017	Olympiakos Nicosia	1−1	Doxa Katokopias	Makario Stadium, Nicosia
14:00 EET	Pachipis 56'	Report	Kenidy 45'	Attendance: 100; Referee: Charalambos Skapoulis

22 February 2017	AEK Larnaca	1−3	Anorthosis	AEK Arena, Larnaca
17:00 EET	Tričkovski 48'	Report	Rayo 5', 12' (pen.); Oliveira 59'	Attendance: 4,000; Referee: Giorgos Nikolaou

5 April 2017	APOEL	0−0	AEL Limassol	GSP Stadium, Nicosia
16:00 EEST		Report		Attendance: 921; Referee: Giorgos Nikolaou

=== Second leg ===
22 February 2017	Apollon Limassol	3−0; Awarded (5–2 agg.)	Omonia	Tsirion Stadium, Limassol
15:00 EET	Maglica 7'; Alexandre 26'; Roberge (red card) 45+1'; Pedro 68'	Report	Sheridan 45+2' (pen.); Filiotis (red card) 67'	Attendance: 6,000; Referee: Leontios Trattou

8 March 2017	Doxa Katokopias	2−1 (a.e.t.) (3–2 agg.)	Olympiakos Nicosia	Makario Stadium, Nicosia
14:00 EET	Coro 14'; Nóbrega 105+2'	Report		Attendance: 100; Referee: Giannis Anastasiou

8 March 2017	Anorthosis	2−2 (5–3 agg.)	AEK Larnaca	Antonis Papadopoulos, Larnaca
15:00 EET	Shehu 64'; Tričkovski 71' (o.g.)	Report	Mitidis 69'; Florian 88'	Attendance: 6,000; Referee: Kostas Psevdiotis

19 April 2017	AEL Limassol	1–1 (1–1 (a) agg.)	APOEL	Tsirion Stadium, Limassol
16:00 EEST	Arruabarrena 81', (red card) 90+2'	Report	Vander (yellow card) 28' (yellow-red card) 44'; Barral 51'	Attendance: 3,108; Referee: Kostas Psevdiotis

== Semi-finals ==
The semi-finals draw took place on 20 April 2017, and the matches played on 26 April and 3 May 2017.

Team 1	Agg.	Team 2	1st leg	2nd leg
Apollon Limassol	6–1	Anorthosis	6–0	0–1
Doxa Katokopias	0–7	APOEL	0–2	0–5

=== First leg ===
26 April 2017	Doxa Katokopias	0–2	APOEL	Makario Stadium, Nicosia
17:00 EEST		Report	Barral 45+1'; Astiz 62'	Attendance: 1,200; Referee: Demetris Masias

26 April 2017	Apollon Limassol	6–0	Anorthosis	Tsirion Stadium, Limassol
18:00 EEST	Maglica 14'; Sardinero 36'; Vinícius 37'; Papoulis 54' (pen.); Makrides 88'; Piech 90+1'	Report		Attendance: 3,936; Referee: Giorgos Nikolaou

=== Second leg ===
3 May 2017	Anorthosis	1–0 (1–6 agg.)	Apollon Limassol	Antonis Papadopoulos, Larnaca
17:00 EEST	Oliveira 34'	Report		Attendance: 500; Referee: Nikolas Neokleous

3 May 2017	APOEL	5–0 (7–0 agg.)	Doxa Katokopias	GSP Stadium, Nicosia
18:00 EEST	Aloneftis 13'; Artymatas 22'; Bertoglio 41'; De Camargo 71'; Vinícius 80'	Report		Attendance: 2,717; Referee: Charalambos Skapoullis

== Final ==
24 May 2017
18:30 EEST

APOEL	0–1	Apollon Limassol
	Report	Vinícius 79'

GSP Stadium, Nicosia
Attendance: 13,906
Referee: Loukas Soteriou

APOEL	Apollon

GK	78	(Cyprus) (Spain) Urko Pardo
DF	21	(Bulgaria) Zhivko Milanov
DF	30	(Cyprus) Giorgos Merkis
DF	44	(Cyprus) Nicholas Ioannou	(yellow card) 28'	(substituted off) 81'
DF	3	(Spain) Roberto Lago
MF	26	(Portugal) Nuno Morais (c)	(yellow card) 56'
MF	16	(Brazil) Vinícius	(yellow card) 68'
MF	46	(Cyprus) Efstathios Aloneftis
MF	77	(Greece) Giannis Gianniotas		(substituted off) 62'
MF	7	(Cyprus) Georgios Efrem	(yellow card) 10'	(substituted off) 78'
FW	20	(Cyprus) Pieros Sotiriou
Substitutes:
GK	99	(Netherlands) Boy Waterman
DF	2	(Cyprus) Kypros Christoforou
DF	23	(Spain) Iñaki Astiz
DF	90	(Central African Republic) Cédric Yambéré
MF	11	(Cyprus) Nektarios Alexandrou
MF	80	(Colombia) Roger Cañas
MF	4	(Cyprus) Kostakis Artymatas
MF	10	(Argentina) Facundo Bertoglio		(substituted on) 78'
MF	77	(Brazil) Vander Vieira		(substituted on) 62'
FW	9	(Belgium) Igor de Camargo		(substituted on) 81'
FW	17	(Spain) David Barral
Manager:
(Spain) (Denmark) Thomas Christiansen

GK	83	(Portugal) Bruno Vale	(yellow card) 62'
DF	55	(Brazil) Paulo Vinícius
DF	22	(France) Valentin Roberge
DF	88	(Cyprus) Giorgos Vasiliou	(yellow card) 14'
DF	17	(Portugal) João Pedro	(yellow card) 52'	(substituted off) 90+3'
MF	5	(Argentina) Esteban Sachetti	(yellow card) 43'
MF	10	(Brazil) Alex da Silva	(yellow card) 5' (yellow-red card) 62'
MF	25	(Cyprus) Chambos Kyriakou
MF	26	(Greece) Fotios Papoulis (c)		(substituted off) 63'
FW	77	(Spain) Adrián Sardinero
FW	99	(Croatia) Anton Maglica
Substitutes:
GK	31	(Cyprus) Michalis Fani
GK	46	(Cyprus) Anastasios Kissas
DF	6	(Cyprus) Andreas Karo
DF	8	(Portugal) Mário Sérgio		(substituted on) 90+3'
DF	33	(Cyprus) Giorgos Pelagias
MF	28	(Cyprus) Marios Stylianou
MF	20	(Scotland) Alastair Reynolds
MF	52	(Cyprus) Ioannis Pittas
FW	57	(Cyprus) Petros Psychas
FW	18	(Poland) Arkadiusz Piech
FW	19	(Ivory Coast) Abraham Guié		(substituted on) 63'
Manager:
(Cyprus) Sofronis Avgousti

Match officials

- Assistant referees:
  - Michalis Soteriou
  - Andreas Andreou
- Fourth official: Vasilis Demetriou

Match rules

- 90 minutes.
- 30 minutes of extra time if necessary.
- Penalty shoot-out if scores still level.
- Eleven named substitutes, of which up to three may be used.

== See also ==
- 2016–17 Cypriot First Division
- 2016–17 Cypriot Second Division

== Sources ==
- "2016/17 Cyprus Cup". RSSSF. 2017-08-24.
