= Pieros Sotiriou =

Cypriot footballer

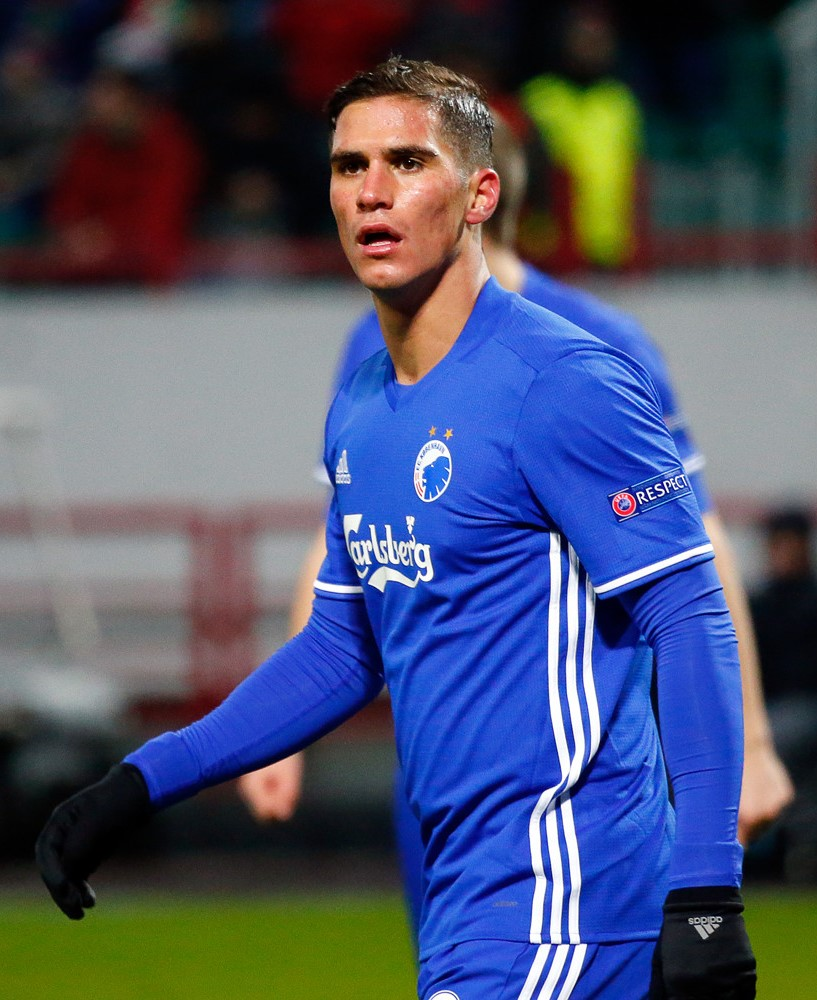
- Sotiriou playing for Copenhagen in 2017

Personal information
- Date of birth: 13 January 1993 (age 33)
- Place of birth: Nicosia, Cyprus
- Height: 1.86 m (6 ft 1 in)
- Position: Forward

Team information
- Current team: APOEL
- Number: 79

Youth career
- 2008–2009: Olympiakos Nicosia

Senior career*
Years	Team	Apps	(Gls)
2009–2013	Olympiakos Nicosia	55	(9)
2013–2017	APOEL	73	(35)
2017–2020	Copenhagen	71	(25)
2020–2021	Astana	14	(6)
2021–2022	Ludogorets Razgrad	36	(19)
2022–2025	Sanfrecce Hiroshima	51	(13)
2025–	APOEL	23	(9)

International career^{‡}
2010–2012	Cyprus U19	7	(5)
2011–2014	Cyprus U21	12	(2)
2012–	Cyprus	67	(12)
- * Club domestic league appearances and goals as of 14 June 2026 ‡ National team caps and goals as of 18:53, 15 November 2025 (UTC)

Pieros Sotiriou (Greek: Πιέρος Σωτηρίου; born on 13 January 1993) is a Cypriot professional footballer who plays as a forward for Cypriot First Division club APOEL and the Cyprus national team.

Sotiriou joined FC Copenhagen in 2017 from APOEL of the Cypriot First Division. In February 2020, he moved to Kazakh side FC Astana.

== Club career ==
=== Olympiakos Nicosia ===
Sotiriou was born in Nicosia, Cyprus. He is a product of Olympiakos Nicosia academies. He made his official debut with Olympiakos in the 2009–10 season, when the club was competing in the Cypriot Second Division, appearing in four matches and scoring one goal. On 19 March 2011, he made his Cypriot First Division debut, playing the last 11 minutes in a match against Doxa Katokopias and he added a further five appearances in the 2010–11 season. The next season (2011–12), he made 16 league appearances (2 at starting line-up, 14 as a substitute) and scored his first Cypriot First Division goal on 18 September 2011, in the third matchday against APOEL where Olympiakos lost by 1–4. In June 2012, it was rumoured that Sheffield Wednesday was interested in him and also on 5 August 2012, he was trialled at S.L. Benfica, but finally stayed at Olympiakos. On 16 November 2012, he renewed his contract with Olympiakos, signing a three-year contract extension. His most productive season with Olympiakos came in 2012–13, when he appeared in 29 league matches (28 at starting line-up, 1 as a substitute) and scored 8 goals.

At the end of the 2012–13 season, he has been awarded the "Young player of the season" award by Cyprus Football Association.

=== APOEL ===
On 24 December 2012, it was announced that Sotiriou's transfer from Olympiakos to APOEL FC was already agreed by the two clubs (for a transfer fee of €90,000), but he stayed to Olympiakos until the end of the 2012–13 season and his four-year contract with APOEL activated in June 2013.

He made his debut on 29 August 2013, in the 2013–14 UEFA Europa League play-off match against Zulte Waregem at GSP Stadium, coming on as a 68th-minute substitute in APOEL's 1–2 defeat. During the 2013–14 season, he appeared in three 2013–14 UEFA Europa League group stage matches for APOEL and won all the titles in Cyprus, the Cypriot League, the Cypriot Cup and the Cypriot Super Cup.

He scored his first official goal for APOEL on 20 September 2014, netting the second goal in APOEL's 3–1 away victory against Ayia Napa in the Cypriot First Division. On 10 December 2014, he made his first group stage appearance, coming on as a 65th-minute substitute in APOEL's 4–0 defeat against Ajax at Amsterdam Arena. On 15 December 2014, he scored twice in APOEL's enthralling 4–4 home draw against AEK Larnaca in the First Division. In the 2014–15 season, he managed to add two more titles to his collection, as APOEL won again both the Cypriot championship and the 2014–15 Cypriot Cup.

On 28 April 2016, Sotiriou scored the opening goal against title rivals AEK Larnaca and sealed the victory which secured APOEL's fourth consecutive Cypriot First Division title.

He scored his first goal in European competitions on 19 July 2016, netting the second goal in APOEL's 3–0 home win against The New Saints in the second qualifying round UEFA Champions League. On 24 August 2016, Sotiriou opened the scoring in APOEL's 1–1 home draw against FC Copenhagen in the Champions League play-off round, but his goal was not enough as his team were defeated 1–2 on aggregate and dropped down to the Europa League group stage.

On 19 September 2016, Sotiriou signed a three-year contract extension with APOEL, running until 31 May 2020.

On 29 September, he scored the only goal in APOEL's 1–0 away victory against Greek club Olympiacos in the Europa League group stage. On 3 November 2016, he scored again in the group stage in APOEL's 1–0 home victory against Swiss side BSC Young Boys. He scored his first ever hat-trick on 8 January 2017, in APOEL's 5–0 home win against Aris Limassol in the 2016–17 First Division. On 23 February 2017, he scored with a flying volley against Athletic Bilbao, as APOEL won 2–0 at home and overturned the 3–2 deficit from the first leg to advanced to the last 16 of the Europa League for the first time in their history. Following his successful 2016–17 season with APOEL, Sotiriou awarded the "Player of the season" award by Cyprus Football Association.

=== FC Copenhagen ===
On 25 April 2017, it was announced that FC Copenhagen had secured his signature on a five-year contract running from 1 July 2017, for an undisclosed transfer fee from APOEL, reported to be around €2.5 million.

=== Astana ===
On 20 February 2020, FC Astana announced the signing of Sotiriou on a three-year contract. The transfer fee paid to Copenhagen was reported as DKK37 million (about €5 million, £4 million).

=== Ludogorets Razgrad ===
In February 2021, Sotiriou moved to Bulgarian club Ludogorets Razgrad on a three-and-a-half-year deal.

=== Sanfrecce Hiroshima ===
On 15 August 2022, Sotiriou signed to J1 club, Sanfrecce Hiroshima for during mid season in 2022. Also, in the Levain Cup final of the same year, he scored a tie goal and a come from behind goal and was awarded the MVP, contributing greatly to the team's victory in the Levain Cup.

== International career ==
On 10 October 2012, Sotiriou was called for the first time into the Cyprus national football team for the 2014 FIFA World Cup qualification matches against Slovenia and Norway, but he remained on the bench in both matches. He made his debut for the national team on 14 November 2012, in a friendly match against Finland at GSP Stadium, coming on as a 63rd-minute substitute in Cyprus' 0–3 defeat. He scored his first international goal on 13 November 2016, netting the second goal in Cyprus' 3–1 home victory against Gibraltar in the 2018 FIFA World Cup qualifiers.

== Personal life ==
On 28 December 2019 Sotiriou married with Cypriot journalist Maria Kortzia, after eight years of relationship. They have two sons: Sophocles (born 9 December 2020) and Giorgos (born 14 June 2022).

== Career statistics ==
=== Club ===
As of the end of 2024 season

Appearances and goals by club, season and competition
Club	Season	League			National cup		League cup		Continental		Other		Total	
Club	Season	Division	Apps	Goals	Apps	Goals	Apps	Goals	Apps	Goals	Apps	Goals	Apps	Goals
Olympiakos Nicosia	2009–10	Cypriot Second Division	4	1	0	0	—		—		—		4	1
Olympiakos Nicosia	2010–11	Cypriot First Division	6	0	0	0	—		—		—		6	0
Olympiakos Nicosia	2011–12	Cypriot First Division	16	1	2	1	—		—		—		18	2
Olympiakos Nicosia	2012–13	Cypriot First Division	29	7	2	1	—		—		—		31	8
Olympiakos Nicosia	Total		55	9	4	2	—		—		—		59	11
APOEL	2013–14	Cypriot First Division	5	0	0	0	—		4 (Note: Appearances in UEFA Europa League)	0	0	0	9	0
APOEL	2014–15	Cypriot First Division	10	4	1	0	—		2 (Note: Appearances in UEFA Champions League)	0	0	0	13	4
APOEL	2015–16	Cypriot First Division	26	10	5	1	—		7 (Note: Five appearances in UEFA Champions League, two appearances in UEFA Europa League)	0	0	0	38	11
APOEL	2016–17	Cypriot First Division	32	21	5	1	—		15 (Note: Six appearances and two goals in UEFA Champions League, nine appearances and three goals in UEFA Europa League)	5	1 (Note: Appearance in Cypriot Super Cup)	0	53	27
APOEL	Total		73	35	11	2	—		28	5	1	0	113	42
Copenhagen	2017–18	Danish Superliga	33	14	1	0	—		14 (Note: Eight appearances and one goal in UEFA Champions League, six appearances and one goal in UEFA Europa League)	2	—		48	16
Copenhagen	2018–19	Danish Superliga	20	2	1	2	—		9	2	—		30	6
Copenhagen	2019–20	Danish Superliga	17	9	1	1	—		11 (Note: Three appearances and one goal in UEFA Champions League, eight appearances and two goals in UEFA Europa League)	3	—		29	13
Copenhagen	Total		71	25	5	3	—		34	7	—		110	35
Astana	2020	Kazakhstan Premier League	14	6	0	0	—		2 (Note: One appearance in UEFA Champions League, one appearance in UEFA Europa League)	0	1 (Note: Appearance in Kazakhstan Super Cup)	1	17	7
Ludogorets	2020–21	Bulgarian First League	9	1	4	1	—		0	0	—		13	2
Ludogorets	2021–22	Bulgarian First League	25	17	2	1	—		14 (Note: Eight appearances and three goals in UEFA Champions League, six appearances and one goal in UEFA Europa League)	4	1 (Note: Appearance in Bulgarian Supercup)	1	42	23
Ludogorets	2022–23	Bulgarian First League	2	1	0	0	—		3 (Note: Three appearances and three goals in UEFA Champions League)	3	0 (Note: Appearance in Bulgarian Supercup)	0	5	4
Ludogorets	Total		36	19	6	2	—		17	7	1	1	60	29
Sanfrecce Hiroshima	2022	J1 League	7	1	3	0	1	2	—		—		11	3
Sanfrecce Hiroshima	2023	J1 League	19	4	0	0	1	0	—		—		20	4
Sanfrecce Hiroshima	2024	J1 League	25	8	1	0	4	1	5 (Note: Appearance in AFC Champions League Two)	2	—		35	11
Sanfrecce Hiroshima	Total		51	13	4	0	6	3	5	2	—		66	18
Career total			300	107	30	9	6	3	87	23	3	2	425	142

=== International ===
As of match played 15 November 2025

Appearances and goals by national team and year
National team	Year	Apps	Goals
Cyprus	2012	1	0
Cyprus	2013	7	0
Cyprus	2014	3	0
Cyprus	2015	3	0
Cyprus	2016	5	1
Cyprus	2017	8	4
Cyprus	2018	5	1
Cyprus	2019	8	4
Cyprus	2020	4	0
Cyprus	2021	7	1
Cyprus	2022	7	1
Cyprus	2023	2	0
Cyprus	2024	3	0
Cyprus	2025	4	0
Total		67	12

Scores and results list Cyprus goal tally first, score column indicates score after each Sotiriou goal.

List of international goals scored by Pieros Sotiriou
No.	Date	Venue	Opponent	Score	Result	Competition
1	13 November 2016	GSP Stadium, Nicosia, Cyprus	Gibraltar	2–1	3–1	2018 FIFA World Cup qualification
2	9 June 2017	Estádio Algarve, Faro/Loulé, Portugal	Gibraltar	2–1	2–1	2018 FIFA World Cup qualification
3	31 August 2017	GSP Stadium, Nicosia, Cyprus	Bosnia and Herzegovina	3–2	3–2	2018 FIFA World Cup qualification
4	7 October 2017	GSP Stadium, Nicosia, Cyprus	Greece	1–0	1–2	2018 FIFA World Cup qualification
5	13 November 2017	Vazgen Sargsyan Republican Stadium, Yerevan, Armenia	Armenia	2–3	2–3	Friendly
6	9 September 2018	GSP Stadium, Nicosia, Cyprus	Slovenia	1–1	2–1	2018–19 UEFA Nations League C
7	21 March 2019	GSP Stadium, Nicosia, Cyprus	San Marino	1–0	5–0	UEFA Euro 2020 qualification
8	21 March 2019	GSP Stadium, Nicosia, Cyprus	San Marino	2–0	5–0	UEFA Euro 2020 qualification
9	6 September 2019	GSP Stadium, Nicosia, Cyprus	Kazakhstan	1–1	1–1	UEFA Euro 2020 qualification
10	10 October 2019	Astana Arena, Nur-Sultan, Kazakhstan	Kazakhstan	1–1	2–1	UEFA Euro 2020 qualification
11	11 October 2021	AEK Arena, Larnaca, Cyprus	Malta	2–1	2–2	2022 FIFA World Cup qualification
12	29 March 2022	AEK Arena, Larnaca, Cyprus	Estonia	2–0	2–0	2020–21 UEFA Nations League C

== Honours ==
APOEL

- Cypriot First Division: 2013–14, 2014–15, 2015–16, 2016–17
- Cypriot Cup: 2013–14, 2014–15
- Cypriot Super Cup: 2013

Copenhagen

- Danish Superliga: 2018–19

Astana

- Kazakhstan Super Cup: 2020

Ludogorets Razgrad

- Bulgarian First League: 2020–21, 2021–22
- Bulgarian Supercup: 2021

Sanfrecce Hiroshima

- J.League Cup: 2022

Individual

- Cyprus Football Association Young Player of the Season: 2012–13
- Cyprus Football Association Player of the Season: 2016–17
- Bulgarian First League Top Goalscorer: 2021–22
