= Arkadiusz Piech =

Polish footballer (born 1985)

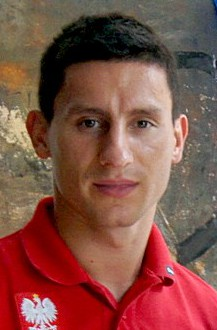
- Piech in 2012

Personal information
- Full name: Arkadiusz Piech
- Date of birth: 7 June 1985 (age 41)
- Place of birth: Świdnica, Poland
- Height: 1.71 m (5 ft 7 in)
- Position: Forward

Team information
- Current team: Polonia Środa Śląska
- Number: 9

Youth career
- Polonia Świdnica

Senior career*
Years	Team	Apps	(Gls)
2004	Polonia Świdnica		
2005–2009	Polonia/Sparta Świdnica		
2007–2008	→ Gawin/Ślęza Wrocław (loan)	18	(9)
2008–2009	→ Widzew Łódź (loan)	4	(0)
2009–2012	Ruch Chorzów	80	(24)
2013	Sivasspor	7	(1)
2013–2014	Zagłębie Lubin	28	(9)
2014–2016	Legia Warsaw	10	(0)
2014–2015	Legia Warsaw II	10	(5)
2015	→ GKS Bełchatów (loan)	15	(11)
2016	→ AEL Limassol (loan)	13	(9)
2016–2017	Apollon Limassol	26	(9)
2017–2019	Śląsk Wrocław	56	(11)
2019–2022	Odra Opole	70	(14)
2022–2024	Górnik Polkowice	26	(12)
2024	Korona Piaski	11	(3)
2024–2026	Piast Nowa Ruda	39	(16)
2026–	Polonia Środa Śląska	14	(7)

International career
2011–2012	Poland	4	(0)
- * Club domestic league appearances and goals as of 18:13, 30 June 2026 (UTC)

Arkadiusz Piech (born 7 June 1985) is a Polish professional footballer who plays as a forward for IV liga Lower Silesia club Polonia Środa Śląska.

== Club career ==
=== Ruch Chorzów ===
Piech made his Ekstraklasa debut on 27 February 2010.

=== Sivasspor ===
Arkadiusz Piech has been the transfer of Sivasspor in January 2013.

=== Legia Warsaw ===
On 18 June 2014, Piech joined Legia Warsaw on a three-year deal.

=== Śląsk Wrocław ===
On 23 June 2017, he signed a contract with Śląsk Wrocław.

== International career ==
Piech made his debut for Poland national team on 16 December 2011, in a match against Bosnia and Hercegovina.

He was named in the provisional squad for the UEFA Euro 2012, but did not make the final cut to the team led by Franciszek Smuda.

== Honours ==
Legia Warsaw

- Ekstraklasa: 2015–16

Śląsk Wrocław II

- IV liga Lower Silesia East: 2018–19

Apollon Limassol

- Cypriot Cup: 2016–17
- Cypriot Super Cup: 2016

Individual

- Ekstraklasa Player of the Season: 2011–12
- Ekstraklasa Player of the Month: March 2012
- Polish Cup top scorer: 2013–14
