= Igor de Camargo =

Belgian footballer (born 1983)

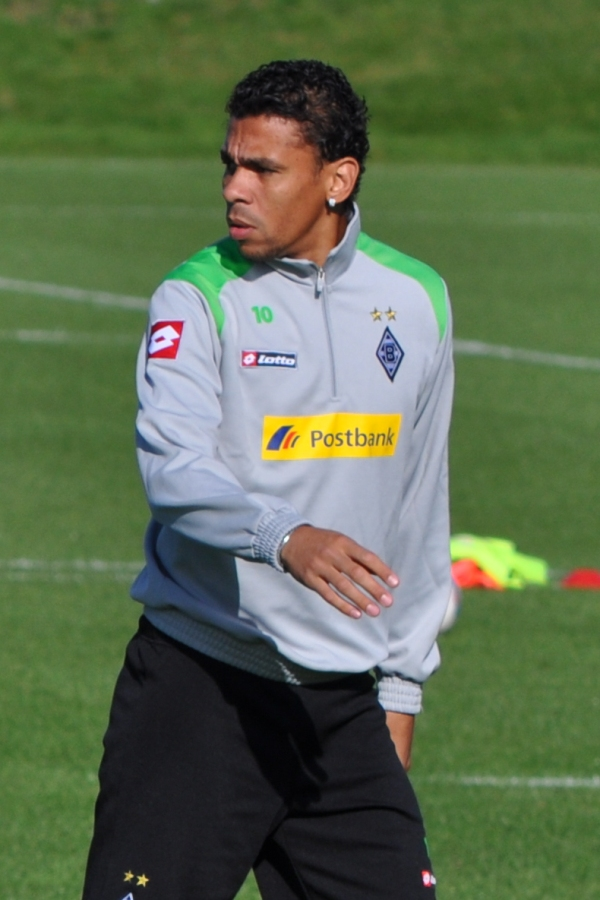
- De Camargo with Borussia Mönchengladbach in 2011

Personal information
- Full name: Igor Alberto Rinck de Diver Camargo
- Date of birth: 12 May 1983 (age 43)
- Place of birth: Porto Feliz, Brazil
- Height: 1.87 m (6 ft 2 in)
- Position: Striker

Team information
- Current team: Genk (assistant manager)

Youth career
- Estrela
- 2000–2001: Genk

Senior career*
Years	Team	Apps	(Gls)
2000	Estrela		
2001–2005	Genk	26	(2)
2003–2004	→ Heusden-Zolder (loan)	33	(10)
2005–2006	Molenbeek	28	(14)
2006–2010	Standard Liège	116	(32)
2010–2013	Borussia Mönchengladbach	58	(14)
2013	→ 1899 Hoffenheim (loan)	8	(1)
2013–2015	Standard Liège	67	(16)
2015–2016	Genk	30	(6)
2016–2018	APOEL	52	(25)
2018–2022	Mechelen	89	(32)
2022	RWDM	11	(2)

International career
2009–2012	Belgium	9	(0)

Managerial career
- 2023–2025: RWDM (assistant manager)
- 2025: RWDM (caretaker)
- 2025: Francs Borains
- 2026: Jong Genk
- 2026–: Genk (assistant manager)
- * Club domestic league appearances and goals

Igor Alberto Rinck de Diver Camargo (born 12 May 1983), known as Igor de Camargo, is a former professional footballer who played as a striker. Born in Brazil, he represented the Belgium national team.

== Club career ==
=== Early career ===
Born in Porto Feliz, São Paulo, De Camargo moved to Belgium in November 2000, after making his senior debut with local side Estrela Esporte Clube. He joined KRC Genk after impressing on a trial, but was only promoted to the first team in 2001 after spending six months with the B-side.

De Camargo only made his senior debut on 20 October 2001, coming on as a late substitute for Moumouni Dagano in a 4–2 home win against KFC Lommel SK. He scored his first goal for the side the following 12 January, netting his team's fifth in a 6–1 away defeat of KSK Beveren.

After featuring rarely during the 2002–03 season (which included 11 minutes in a 6–0 loss at Real Madrid in the UEFA Champions League), De Camargo was loaned to newly promoted side K. Beringen-Heusden-Zolder in June 2003 for the coming season.

De Camargo scored ten goals for the side during the campaign; highlights included a brace in a 3–1 home win against RSC Charleroi on 4 April 2004. Upon returning to Genk, he featured sparingly before moving to fellow top-tier side FC Molenbeek Brussels Strombeek in January 2005.

=== Standard Liège ===
In late January 2006, De Camargo agreed to a contract with Standard Liège, still in the top division. He made his debut for the club on 11 February in a 2–0 away defeat of KSK Beveren, and scored his first goal the following weekend in a 7–1 home win against Cercle Brugge KSV.

De Camargo was a regular starter during the following campaigns, being a key member of the attack as Standard won two league titles in a row. In January 2009, he signed a new contract until June 2013.

On 16 September 2009, De Camargo captained the side in a 3–2 home loss against Arsenal.

=== Borussia Mönchengladbach ===
On 22 April 2010, De Camargo announced that he would transfer to Bundesliga club Borussia Mönchengladbach at the end of the season. After struggling with injuries, he made his debut for the club on 2 October, playing the last eight minutes in a 1–1 home draw against VfL Wolfsburg.

De Camargo scored his first goal for Borussa on 6 November 2010, netting his team's third in a 3–3 home draw against FC Bayern Munich; he previously assisted Marco Reus in Borussia's second goal. He suffered a knee injury in the following match which kept him out of the latter stages of the season, but still returned in May. He scored the winner on 19 May in a 1–0 home defeat of VfL Bochum, and also assisted Reus in the equalizer in the 1–1 away draw in the return leg six days later, as his side narrowly avoided relegation through the play-offs.

De Camargo was loaned to fellow top-tier club TSG 1899 Hoffenheim on 29 January 2013, until the end of the season. He left the side with one goal in only eight matches, being an unused substitute in both legs of the relegation play-offs.

=== Back to Standard Liège ===
On 8 July 2013, De Camargo signed a three-year contract at his former club Standard Liège. A backup to Imoh Ezekiel and Michy Batshuayi during his first season, he managed to score eleven goals in his second.

=== Back to Genk ===
On 23 June 2015, KRC Genk signed De Camargo from Standard Liège; he returned to his first professional club on a two-year deal. He played his first match for the side on 25 July, starting and scoring a brace in a 3–1 home win against OH Leuven.

Despite appearing regularly, De Camargo only contributed with seven goals in 33 matches.

=== APOEL ===
On 15 July 2016, De Camargo signed a two-year contract with reigning Cypriot champions APOEL FC. He made his competitive debut on 27 July as a 77th-minute substitute in his team's 2–1 away defeat against Rosenborg BK in the third qualifying round of the Champions League.

De Camargo scored his first goal for APOEL on 10 September, netting the third goal in his team's 4–0 away victory against Nea Salamis Famagusta FC in the 2016–17 First Division. Five days later, he scored the winner against FC Astana in the group stage of the 2016–17 UEFA Europa League.

=== KV Mechelen ===
On 1 June 2018 he joined Mechelen on a free transfer. After the end of the 2020–21 season he considered retirement from football.

=== RWDM ===
On 18 January 2022, De Camargo signed with RWDM until the end of the 2021–22 season, returning to the club 17 years later (RWDM claims the history of Molenbeek, which has been dissolved since De Camargo played there).

== International career ==
In January 2009, De Camargo received Belgian nationality. he was called up to the Belgium national team and made his debut against Slovenia in February 2009. He appeared in nine matches during his international career with Belgium, but without managing to score.

== Career statistics ==
=== Club ===
As of 8 December 2020

Appearances and goals by club, season and competition
Club	Season	League			Cup		Continental		Other		Total	
Club	Season	Division	Apps	Goals	Apps	Goals	Apps	Goals	Apps	Goals	Apps	Goals
Genk	2001–02	Belgian First Division A	5	1	—		—		—		5	1
Genk	2002–03	Belgian First Division A	5	0	—		1 (Note: Appearance(s) in UEFA Champions League)	0	—		6	0
Genk	2004–05	Belgian First Division A	15	1	1	1	6 (Note: Appearance(s) in UEFA Intertoto Cup)	2	—		22	4
Genk	Total		25	2	1	1	7	2	—		33	5
Heusden-Zolder (loan)	2003–04	Belgian First Division A	33	10	4	1	—		—		37	11
Molenbeek	2004–05	Belgian First Division A	13	5	—		—		—		13	5
Molenbeek	2005–06	Belgian First Division A	15	9	—		—		—		15	9
Molenbeek	Total		28	14	—		—		—		28	14
Standard Liège	2005–06	Belgian First Division A	4	1	1	0	—		—		5	1
Standard Liège	2006–07	Belgian First Division A	24	10	6	5	—		—		30	15
Standard Liège	2007–08	Belgian First Division A	32	8	4	1	4 (Note: Appearance(s) in UEFA Cup)	1	—		40	10
Standard Liège	2008–09	Belgian First Division A	29	8	1	0	9 (Note: Two appearances in UEFA Champions League, seven appearances and two goals in UEFA Cup)	2	1 (Note: Appearance(s) in Belgian Supercup)	0	40	10
Standard Liège	2009–10	Belgian First Division A	27	6	1	0	11 (Note: Five appearances and one goal in UEFA Champions League, six appearances and three goals in UEFA Europa League)	4	1	0	40	10
Standard Liège	Total		116	33	13	6	24	7	2	0	155	46
Borussia Mönchengladbach	2010–11	Bundesliga	19	7	2	0	—		2 (Note: Appearance(s) in Bundesliga Relegation Playoffs)	1	23	8
Borussia Mönchengladbach	2011–12	Bundesliga	25	5	4	1	—		—		29	6
Borussia Mönchengladbach	2012–13	Bundesliga	14	2	2	0	6 (Note: Two appearances in UEFA Champions League, four appearances and three goals in UEFA Europa League)	3	—		22	5
Borussia Mönchengladbach	Total		58	14	8	1	6	3	2	0	74	18
1899 Hoffenheim (loan)	2012–13	Bundesliga	8	1	—		—		0	0	8	1
Standard Liège	2013–14	Belgian First Division A	30	5	1	0	7 (Note: Appearance(s) in UEFA Europa League)	3	—		38	8
Standard Liège	2014–15	Belgian First Division A	37	11	2	0	10 (Note: Four appearances in UEFA Champions League, six appearances in UEFA Europa League)	0	—		49	11
Standard Liège	Total		67	16	3	0	17	3	—		87	19
Genk	2015–16	Belgian First Division A	30	6	3	1	—		—		33	7
APOEL	2016–17	Cypriot First Division	27	10	7	1	12 (Note: Four appearances in UEFA Champions League, eight appearances and two goals in UEFA Europa League)	2	1 (Note: Appearance(s) in Cypriot Super Cup)	0	47	13
APOEL	2017–18	Cypriot First Division	25	15	3	3	11	3	0	0	39	19
APOEL	Total		52	25	10	4	23	5	1	0	86	34
Mechelen	2018–19	Belgian First Division B	22	14	6	3	—		—		28	17
Mechelen	2019–20	Belgian First Division A	27	10	(Note: club not allowed to participate)		(Note: club not allowed to participate)		1	0	28	10
Mechelen	2020–21	Belgian First Division A	11	3			0	0			11	3
Career total			456	143	48	17	77	20	4	0	600	184

=== International ===
As of 25 May 2012

Appearances and goals by national team and year
National team	Year	Apps	Goals
Belgium	2009	4	0
Belgium	2011	4	0
Belgium	2012	1	0
Total		9	0

== Honours ==
Genk

- Belgian First Division: 2001–02

Standard Liège

- Belgian First Division: 2007–08, 2008–09
- Belgian Supercup: 2008, 2009

APOEL

- Cypriot First Division: 2016–17, 2017–18

Mechelen

- Belgian Cup: 2018–19
