= Giorgos Merkis =

Cypriot footballer

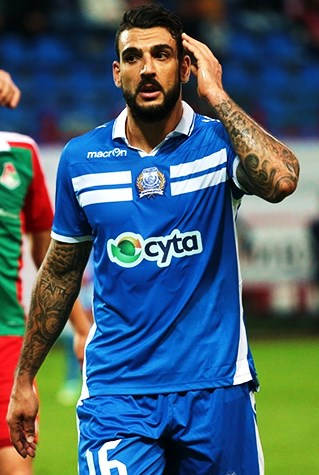

Personal information
- Full name: Giorgos Merkis
- Date of birth: 30 July 1984 (age 42)
- Place of birth: Limassol, Cyprus
- Height: 1.88 m (6 ft 2 in)
- Position: Centre back

Youth career
- 1990–2001: Apollon Limassol

Senior career*
| Years | Team | Apps | (Gls) |
| 2001–2016 | Apollon Limassol | 252 | (17) |
| 2016–2021 | APOEL | 138 | (11) |
| Total | | 390 | (28) |

International career^{‡}
| 2006–2019 | Cyprus | 55 | (1) |
- * Club domestic league appearances and goals as of 13 May 2021 ‡ National team caps and goals as of 21 April 2018

Giorgos Merkis (Greek: Γιώργος Μερκής, born 30 July 1984) is a retired Greek Cypriot professional footballer who played as a centre back for Cypriot First Division clubs Apollon Limassol and APOEL, and the Cyprus national team.

== Career ==
=== Apollon Limassol ===
Merkis is a product of Apollon Limassol academies, making his first team debut during 2001–02 season at the age of 17. He spent the vast majority of his career with Apollon, where he won one championship, two cups and one super cup. After fifteen years at the club, his contract was mutually terminated on 12 January 2016.

=== APOEL ===
On 12 January 2016, Merkis signed an 18-month contract with fellow Cypriot First Division club APOEL. He made his official debut on 17 January 2016, coming on as a 69th-minute substitute in APOEL's 3–0 home win against Enosis Neon Paralimni for the Cypriot First Division. He scored his first goal for APOEL against his former team Apollon Limassol on 2 April 2016, netting a late equalizer in his team's 2–2 home draw for the Cypriot First Division Championship play-offs. A few months after joining APOEL, he was crowned champion as his team won the Cypriot First Division title for a fourth consecutive time.

On 2 March 2017, Merkis signed a two-year contract extension with APOEL, running until 31 May 2019.

== International career ==
Merkis made his international debut with Cyprus National Team on 1 March 2006, in friendly match against Armenia at Tsirion Stadium, coming on as a 79th-minute substitute in Cyprus' 2–0 win. He scored his first goal on 16 November 2014, netting the opening goal in the 5–0 home victory against Andorra in the UEFA Euro 2016 qualifiers.

=== International goals ===
Scores and results list Cyprus' goal tally first.

| No | Date | Venue | Opponent | Score | Result | Competition |
|---|---|---|---|---|---|---|
| 1. | 16 November 2014 | GSP Stadium, Nicosia, Cyprus | Andorra | 1–0 | 5–0 | UEFA Euro 2016 qualification |

== Honours ==
Apollon Limassol

- Cypriot First Division: 2005–06
- Cypriot Cup: 2009–10, 2012–13

APOEL

- Cypriot First Division: 2015–16, 2016–17, 2017–18, 2018–19
- Cypriot Super Cup: 2019

== Personal life ==
On June 3, 2017 Merkis married Cypriot journalist Andrea Kyriakou. On October 8, 2018 Kyriakou gave birth to their first child, a son Labrinos Merkis.
