= Luis Arturo Peralta =

Colombian footballer (born 1992)

Personal information
- Full name: Luis Arturo Peralta Ariño
- Date of birth: July 30, 1992 (age 34)
- Place of birth: Fonseca, La Guajira, Colombia
- Height: 1.84 m (6 ft 0 in)
- Position: Forward

Team information
- Current team: Platense

Senior career*
Years	Team	Apps	(Gls)
2007–2011	Deportes Tolima	4	(0)
2011–2014	Gimnasia	31	(4)
2014–2016	Gimnasia de Jujuy	54	(7)
2016	Once Caldas	12	(1)
2016	Doxa Katokopias	12	(1)
2017–2018	Bangu	9	(1)
2018	Monagas	17	(2)
2019	Sport Boys	18	(5)
2020	Valledupar	13	(2)
2021–2022	FAS	34	(11)
2022	Sport Chavelines	7	(1)
2022	Atletico Marte	4	(0)
2023	Isidro Metapan	14	(4)
2024	Deportivo Mixco	6	(0)
2025	ADA Jaén	5	(1)
2025–	Platense		

International career
2008–2009	Colombia U17	7	(6)
- * Club domestic league appearances and goals as of 30 May 2021

Luis Arturo Peralta Ariño (born July 30, 1992) is a Colombian professional footballer who plays as a forward for Salvadoran club Platense.

== Career statistics ==
Appearances and goals by club, season and competition
Club	Season	League		Cup		Continental		Total	
Club	Season	Apps	Goals	Apps	Goals	Apps	Goals	Apps	Goals
Deportes Tolima	2007–08	5	0	0	0	—		5	0
Deportes Tolima	2009	4	0	0	0	—		4	0
Deportes Tolima	2010	3	0	0	0	—		3	0
Deportes Tolima	Total	12	0	0	0	0	0	12	0
Gimnasia	2011–12	0	0	1	0	—		1	0
Gimnasia	2012–13	23	3	2	0	—		25	2
Gimnasia	2013–14	8	1	—		—		8	1
Gimnasia	Total	31	4	3	0	0	0	34	4
Gimnasia de Jujuy	2014	19	3	1	0	—		20	3
Gimnasia de Jujuy	2015	35	4	—		—		35	4
Gimnasia de Jujuy	Total	54	7	1	0	0	0	55	7
Once Caldas	2016	12	1	5	1	—		17	2
Doxa Katokopias	2016–17	12	2	—		—		12	2
Bangu	2017	5	0	—		—		5	0
Bangu	2018	2	1	—		—		2	1
Bangu	Total	7	1	0	0	0	0	7	1
Monagas	2018	12	2	1	0	—		13	2
Sport Boys	2019	11	4	—		—		11	4
Valledupar	2020	13	2	—		—		13	2
FAS	2021	18	5	—		—		18	5
FAS	2021–22	23	9	—		2	0	25	9
FAS	Total	41	14	0	0	2	0	43	14
Career total		143	34	10	1	2	0	155	35

== Honours ==
FAS

- Salvadoran Primera División: Clausura 2021
