= Kypros Christoforou =

Cypriot footballer (born 1993)

Personal information
- Full name: Kypros Christoforou
- Date of birth: 24 April 1993 (age 33)
- Place of birth: Limassol, Cyprus
- Height: 1.81 m (5 ft 11 1/2 in)
- Position: Right back

Team information
- Current team: Karmiotissa
- Number: 27

Youth career
- –2011: Aris Limassol

Senior career*
Years	Team	Apps	(Gls)
2012–2017	Aris Limassol	83	(0)
2016–2017	→ APOEL (loan)	2	(0)
2017–2018	APOEL	0	(0)
2017–2018	→ Aris Limassol (loan)	13	(0)
2018–2019	→ Nea Salamina (loan)	24	(1)
2019–2021	Nea Salamina	57	(1)
2021–2023	AEK Larnaca	20	(0)
2023–	Karmiotissa	16	(0)

International career^{‡}
2016–	Cyprus	2	(0)
- * Club domestic league appearances and goals as of 20 June 2024 ‡ National team caps and goals as of 21 November 2019

Kypros Christoforou (Greek: Κύπρος Χριστοφόρου; born 24 April 1993) is a Cypriot footballer who plays as a right back for Karmiotissa.

== Career ==
=== Aris Limassol ===
Christoforou is a product Aris Limassol academies. He made his official debut on 11 May 2012, coming on as an 83rd-minute substitute in Aris Limassol's 2–2 draw with Ethnikos Achna for the Cypriot First Division.

=== APOEL ===
On 25 August 2016, Christoforou joined reigning Cypriot champions APOEL on a one-year loan deal from Aris Limassol. He made his official debut against AEZ Zakakiou on 22 January 2017, in APOEL's 7–0 home victory for the Cypriot First Division.

== International career ==
Christoforou made his debut for the Cyprus national team on 25 May 2016, in a friendly match against Serbia, coming on as a late substitute in Cyprus' 1–2 defeat. Christoforou played a second time for his national team on 19 November 2019 against Belgium and scored an own goal in the 6–1 defeat for his country.

== Career statistics ==
=== Club ===
As of 20 May 2017

Club	Season	League			Cup		Continental		Other		Total	
Club	Season	Division	Apps	Goals	Apps	Goals	Apps	Goals	Apps	Goals	Apps	Goals
Aris Limassol	2011–12	Cypriot First Division	1	0	0	0	—		—		1	0
Aris Limassol	2012–13	Cypriot Second Division	0	0	0	0	—		—		0	0
Aris Limassol	2013–14	Cypriot First Division	25	0	1	0	—		—		26	0
Aris Limassol	2014–15	Cypriot Second Division	22	0	1	0	—		—		23	0
Aris Limassol	2015–16	Cypriot First Division	34	0	4	0	—		—		38	0
Aris Limassol	2016–17	Cypriot First Division	1	0	0	0	—		—		1	0
Aris Limassol	Total		83	0	6	0	—		—		89	0
APOEL (Loan)	2016–17	Cypriot First Division	2	0	1	0	0 (Note: Appearances in UEFA Europa League)	0	—		3	0
Career total			85	0	7	0	0	0	0	0	92	0

=== International ===
As of 25 May 2016

Cyprus
Year	Apps	Goals
2016	1	0
Total	1	0

== Honours ==
Aris Limassol

- Cypriot Second Division (1): 2012–13

APOEL

- Cypriot First Division (1): 2016–17
