= Facundo Bertoglio =

Argentine footballer (born 1990)

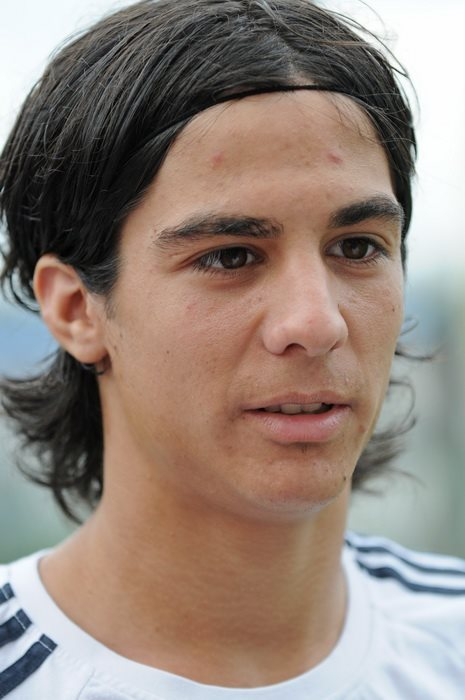
- Bertoglio in 2010

Personal information
- Full name: Facundo Daniel Bertoglio
- Date of birth: 30 June 1990 (age 36)
- Place of birth: San José de la Esquina, Argentina
- Height: 1.72 m (5 ft 7 1/2 in)
- Position: Midfielder

Youth career
- 2008–2009: Colón de Santa Fe

Senior career*
Years	Team	Apps	(Gls)
2009–2010	Colón de Santa Fe	42	(4)
2010–2016	Dynamo Kyiv	4	(0)
2012–2013	→ Grêmio (loan)	16	(5)
2013–2014	→ Evian (loan)	14	(0)
2014–2015	→ Tigre (loan)	23	(3)
2015–2016	→ Asteras Tripolis (loan)	20	(3)
2016–2018	APOEL	33	(5)
2018	Ordabasy	14	(1)
2018–2019	Lamia	28	(5)
2019–2020	Aldosivi	19	(3)
2020–2022	Aris	55	(7)
2022–2023	Asteras Tripolis	22	(0)
2023–2024	Volos	22	(2)
2024	Iraklis	9	(2)
Total		321	(40)

International career
2010	Argentina	1	(2)
- * Club domestic league appearances and goals as of 19 December 2024

Facundo Daniel Bertoglio (born 30 June 1990) is an Argentine former professional footballer who played as an attacking midfielder.

He was also capped by Argentina in 2010.

== Club career ==
Bertoglio made his professional debut for Colón de Santa Fe on 2 May 2009 in a 2–0 away defeat to Argentinos Juniors. He scored his first goal for the club on 8 October 2009 after coming on as a 2nd half substitute in a 4–1 win against Arsenal de Sarandí.

Bertoglio had an excellent match versus Boca Juniors in the Clausura 2010, scoring two goals. On 19 May 2010 the 19-year-old midfielder left Colón de Santa Fe to sign a five-year deal with Dynamo Kyiv, the Argentinian club has earned 4 million euros. This price is the highest ever received by Colón for a transfer.

Dynamo Kyiv's, Argentine midfielder Facundo Bertoglio has arrived in Porto Alegre to seal terms on a loan move. The deal will see the international midfielder, arrive on a twelve-month deal which will feature a fixed-price option to buy. The midfielder will be expected to take up the attacking midfield position previously occupied by Douglas dos Santos, before his move to Corinthians in the past couple of weeks. In July 2013, he signed a one-year contract with French side Evian on loan from Dynamo Kyiv.

After a year in Ligue 1, Bertoglio returns to Ukraine, being one among many who wanted to emigrate from Ukraine due to political problems, finally play for Tigre, on loan until June 2015. The Russo-Ukrainian war caused most Argentine players who played in the League to go to another club and even decided not to training. He made his debut with Fabián Alegre's team in a win 4-0 match against Racing Club, as a substitute for Kevin Itabel. At the end of the loan he returned to Dynamo Kyiv.

Rumours said that Bertoglio has agreed on a contract with the Greek Super League Greece side Asteras Tripolis. Eventually on 21 July 2015 he signed a one-year contract with Asteras Tripolis on loan from Dynamo Kyiv for an undisclosed fee. On 22 August 2015, he made his debut with the club in a Super League game against Panthrakikos scoring the second goal in a 3–0 away win.

On 23 August 2016, Bertoglio joined reigning Cypriot Cypriot champions APOEL FC on a two-year deal, with an option for a third year. He made his official debut on 28 August 2016, coming on as a 78th-minute substitute and managing to win a penalty and serve an assist in APOEL's 3–0 home victory against Ermis Aradippou for the Cypriot First Division. He scored his first goal for APOEL on 15 October 2016, netting the opening goal in his team's 4–1 away victory against AEZ Zakakiou for the Cypriot First Division.

On 28 February 2018, Kazakhstan Premier League club FC Ordabasy announced the signing of Bertoglio.

On 17 July 2018, Lamia officially announced the capture of Argentine former international attacking midfielder Facundo Daniel Bertoglio from FC Ordabasy. On 27 October 2018, he scored his first goal in a dramatic 3–2 home win against Levadiakos. On 21 January 2019, Facundo scored with an amazing volley after Jerónimo Barrales' assist to give his team an important 1–0 home win against Panathinaikos. On 18 February 2019, he sealed a 3–1 away win against OFI, in the battle to avoid relegation. Six days later, he completed a comeback against AEL, sealing a 2–1 home win, after an assist from Jean Luc Assoubre.

The 29-year old has impressed with his performances, having scored four goals and given one assist so far this season, is out of contract next summer and has attracted interest from both Aris and Panathinaikos, who are monitoring him and could potentially make a move to secure his signature. On 4 May 2019, Facundo completed an excellent season, by scoring in a comfortable 3–0 away win against Apollon Smyrnis.

On 25 July 2019, he signed a contract with Argentine Primera División club Club Atlético Aldosivi.

On 12 August 2020, he returned to Greece and signed a two-year contract with Aris. In his official debut, he scored helping to a 3–1 home win against Lamia, on 11 September 2020. On 28 November 2020, he scored in a 2–1 home loss against Olympiacos, the first of the season.

On 19 December 2020, he scored a brace in an emphatic 3–0 away win against OFI. On 7 January 2021, he sealed a 2–0 home win against Volos.

On 20 January 2021, he sealed a 2–0 home win against Asteras Tripolis for the first leg of the Greek Cup round of 16, setting a new personal best with 6 goals in 15 games.

== International career ==
Bertoglio was called for the Albiceleste to play against Haiti on 5 May 2010 and scored two goals in his international debut.

=== International goals ===
No.	Date	Venue	Opponent	Score	Result	Competition	Ref.
1	May 5, 2010	El Coloso del Ruca Quimey, Cutral Có, Argentina	Haiti	1–0	4–0	Friendly	
2	May 5, 2010	El Coloso del Ruca Quimey, Cutral Có, Argentina	Haiti	3–0	4–0	Friendly	

== Honours ==
=== APOEL ===
- Cypriot First Division: 2016–17
