= Vinícius (footballer, born 1986) =

Brazilian footballer

Personal information
- Full name: Vinícius Oliveira Franco
- Date of birth: 16 May 1986 (age 40)
- Place of birth: Campo Grande, Brazil
- Height: 1.86 m (6 ft 1 in)
- Position: Midfielder

Team information
- Current team: Nea Salamina
- Number: 16

Youth career
- –2004: União São João

Senior career*
Years	Team	Apps	(Gls)
2004	União São João		
2004–2006	Porto B		
2006–2007	Nacional	2	(0)
2007	→ União da Madeira (loan)	13	(3)
2007–2008	União da Madeira	27	(3)
2008–2010	Aves	42	(6)
2010	Olhanense	12	(0)
2011–2013	Braga	9	(0)
2012–2013	→ Moreirense (loan)	28	(3)
2013–2018	APOEL	111	(16)
2019	Sanat Naft	14	(0)
2019–2020	Olympiakos Nicosia	19	(0)
2020–	Nea Salamina	0	(0)
- * Club domestic league appearances and goals as of 19:15, 16 June 2020 (UTC)

Vinícius Oliveira Franco, or simply Vinícius (born May 16, 1986) is a Brazilian footballer who plays for Nea Salamina in the Cypriot First Division as a central midfielder.

== Career ==
=== Portugal ===
Vinícius moved abroad for the first time in 2004 to join Portuguese club FC Porto B. During his eight-year spell in Portugal he played also for C.D. Nacional, União da Madeira, C.D. Aves, S.C. Olhanense, S.C. Braga and Moreirense.

=== APOEL ===
On 10 July 2013, after eight seasons in the Portuguese leagues, Vinícius signed a two-year contract with APOEL FC from Cyprus. He made his official debut on 17 August 2013 against Apollon Limassol in the Cypriot Super Cup final, in a match which APOEL won 1–0 and lifted the trophy. He scored his first official goal for APOEL on 2 September 2013, in his team's 3–0 home win against Enosis Neon Paralimni for the Cypriot First Division. During the 2013–14 season, he appeared in all six 2013–14 UEFA Europa League group stage matches for APOEL and also managed to win all the titles in Cyprus, the Cypriot League, the Cypriot Cup and the Cypriot Super Cup.

On 20 August 2014, Vinícius scored the equalizer against Aalborg BK at Nordjyske Arena, in APOEL's 1–1 first leg draw for the play-off round of the UEFA Champions League. On 26 August 2014, he scored again in the return leg against Aalborg BK, helping his team to win 4–0 and reach the group stage of the UEFA Champions League. Vinícius appeared in every group stage match in APOEL's 2014–15 UEFA Champions League campaign. On 6 December 2014, Vinícius signed a two-year contract extension with APOEL, running until June 2017.

On 15 September 2016, he scored the equalizer in APOEL's 2–1 home victory over FC Astana for the group stage of the UEFA Europa League. On 19 May 2017, Vinícius signed a two-year contract extension with APOEL, running until June 2019.

=== Olympiakos Nicosia ===
On 5 September 2019 he signed for Olympiakos Nicosia.

== Career statistics ==
As of 29 December 2017

Club	Season	League			Cup		League Cup		Continental		Other		Total	
Club	Season	Division	Apps	Goals	Apps	Goals	Apps	Goals	Apps	Goals	Apps	Goals	Apps	Goals
Nacional	2006–07	Primeira Liga	2	0	1	0	—		2 (Note: Appearances in UEFA Europa League)	0	—		5	0
União (loan)	2006–07	Segunda Divisão	13	3	1	0	—		—		—		14	3
União	2007–08	Segunda Divisão	27	3	0	0	—		—		—		27	3
União	Total		40	6	1	0	—		—		—		41	6
Aves	2008–09	Segunda Liga	21	2	1	0	2	0	—		—		24	2
Aves	2009–10	Segunda Liga	21	4	0	0	2	0	—		—		23	4
Aves	Total		42	6	1	0	4	0	—		—		47	6
Olhanense	2010–11	Primeira Liga	12	0	2	0	1	0	—		—		15	0
Braga	2010–11	Primeira Liga	3	0	0	0	0	0	—		—		3	0
Braga	2011–12	Primeira Liga	6	0	1	0	1	0	1	0	—		9	0
Braga	Total		9	0	1	0	1	0	1	0	—		12	0
Moreirense (loan)	2012–13	Primeira Liga	28	3	2	0	3	0	—		—		33	3
APOEL	2013–14	Cypriot First Division	32	5	7	0	—		8	0	1 (Note: Appearances in Cypriot Super Cup)	0	48	5
APOEL	2014–15	Cypriot First Division	16	0	1	0	—		10 (Note: Appearances in UEFA Champions League)	2	1	0	28	2
APOEL	2015–16	Cypriot First Division	29	5	5	1	—		9 (Note: Appearances in UEFA Champions League and UEFA Europa League)	0	1	0	44	6
APOEL	2016–17	Cypriot First Division	27	6	5	1	—		14	1	0	0	46	8
APOEL	2017–18		7						12					
APOEL	Total		114	16	18	2	—		53	3	2	0	187	21
Career total			244	31	26	2	9	0	56	3	3	0	338	36

== Honours ==
APOEL

- Cypriot First Division: 2013–14, 2014–15, 2015–16, 2016–17
- Cypriot Cup: 2013–14, 2014–15
- Cypriot Super Cup: 2013
