= Georgios Kolokoudias =

Cypriot footballer (born 1989)

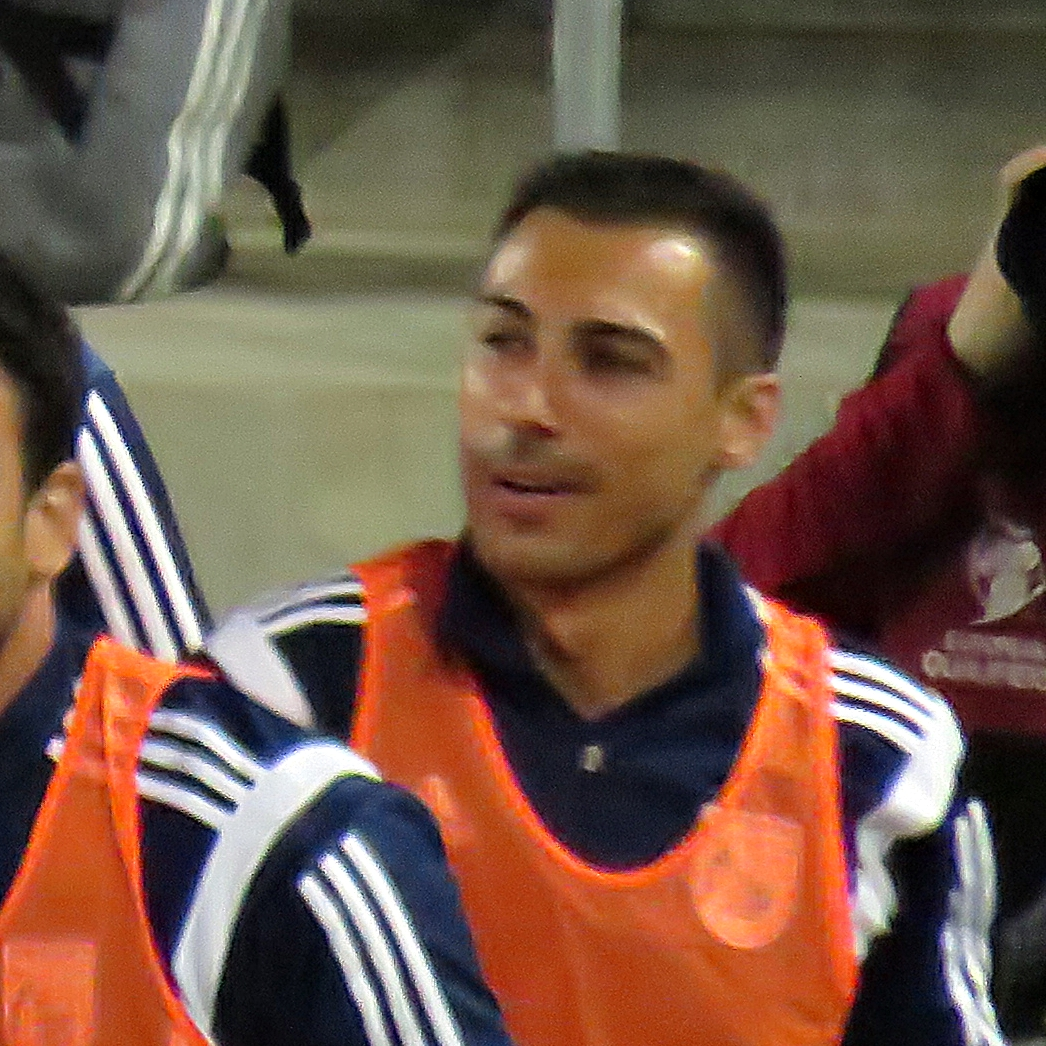

Personal information
- Full name: Georgios Kolokoudias
- Date of birth: May 3, 1989 (age 37)
- Place of birth: Paralimni, Cyprus
- Height: 1.75 m (5 ft 9 in)
- Position: Striker

Team information
- Current team: Ayia Napa

Youth career
- Enosis Neon Paralimni

Senior career*
Years	Team	Apps	(Gls)
2006–2007	Enosis Neon Paralimni	7	(0)
2007–2008	Panserraikos	1	(0)
2008–2009	Enosis Neon Paralimni	16	(2)
2009–2010	Olympiakos Nicosia	25	(10)
2010	Digenis Morphou	15	(4)
2011–2012	Anagennisi Dherynia	35	(3)
2012–2015	Ayia Napa	67	(32)
2015–2016	Apollon Limassol	19	(3)
2016–2017	Nea Salamina	26	(3)
2018–2019	Enosis Neon Paralimni	42	(19)
2019–	Ayia Napa	18	(8)

International career^{‡}
2005–2006	Cyprus U-17	3	(0)
2007–2009	Cyprus U-19	4	(0)
2009–2011	Cyprus U-21	2	(2)
2014–	Cyprus	1	(0)
- * Club domestic league appearances and goals as of 21 May 2020 ‡ National team caps and goals as of 10 October 2015

Georgios Kolokoudias (Greek: Γεώργιος Κολοκούδιας; born 3 May 1989) is a Cypriot football striker. He plays for Ayia Napa.

In the past he played for Digenis Akritas Morphou, Olympiakos Nicosia, Enosis Neon Paralimni and Panserraikos in Greece. He trialed for English League One side Swindon Town FC in July 2009 before signing for Olympiakos.
