= Wesllem =

Portuguese footballer

Personal information
- Full name: António Wesllem Sousa Monteiro
- Date of birth: 21 April 1985 (age 41)
- Place of birth: Marco de Canaveses, Portugal
- Height: 1.78 m (5 ft 10 in)
- Position: Forward

Youth career
- 1996–1999: Tuías
- 1999–2000: Marco
- 2000–2002: Porto
- 2002–2004: Leixões

Senior career*
Years	Team	Apps	(Gls)
2004	Leixões	1	(0)
2004–2005	Pedras Rubras	21	(2)
2005–2009	Leça	54	(23)
2009–2010	Rio Ave	6	(0)
2010–2011	Penafiel	18	(2)
2011–2012	Leixões	20	(0)
2012–2013	Anagennisi Deryneia	25	(10)
2013–2014	AEK Kouklia	32	(2)
2014–2015	Pafos	22	(5)
2015–2017	Anagennisi Deryneia	47	(15)
2017	Olimpia Grudziądz	5	(0)
2017–2021	Anagennisi Deryneia	89	(13)
- * Club domestic league appearances and goals

António Wesllem Sousa Monteiro (born 21 April 1985), known as Wesllem, is a Portuguese former professional footballer who played as a forward.

== Club career ==
Born in Marco de Canaveses, Porto District of Brazilian descent, Wesllem played youth football for four teams including FC Porto. He spent the vast majority of his senior career also in Portugal, but mostly in the lower leagues.

Wesllem's only season in the Primeira Liga was 2009–10, when he represented Rio Ave FC. He only totalled 71 minutes of action during the entire campaign, his debut coming on 16 August 2009 in a 1–1 away draw with U.D. Leiria.

In the summer of 2012, after a further two years in the second level, Wesllem moved to the Cypriot Second Division with Anagennisi Deryneia FC. On 12 August 2013 he signed with another side in the country, AEK Kouklia FC. He made his first appearance in the First Division – as the club – against AEK Larnaca FC on the 31st, playing the full 90 minutes in a 2–1 home win.
