= 2015–16 Cypriot First Division =

Cyta Championship
- Season: 2015–16
- Champions: APOEL; 25th title
- Relegated: Enosis; Ayia Napa; Pafos
- Champions League: APOEL
- Europa League: AEK; Apollon; Omonia
- Matches: 242
- Goals: 669 (2.76 per match)
- Top goalscorer: Fernando Cavenaghi; André Alves; Dimitar Makriev (19 goals)
- Biggest home win: APOEL 6–0 AEL (17 October 2015); Omonia 6–0 Pafos (24 October 2015)
- Biggest away win: Salamina 0–9 APOEL (26 October 2015)
- Highest scoring: Salamina 0–9 APOEL (26 October 2015)
- Longest winning run: 12 matches APOEL
- Longest unbeaten run: 17 matches APOEL
- Longest winless run: 26 matches Ayia Napa
- Longest losing run: 10 matches Ayia Napa
- Highest attendance: 14,379; APOEL 2–0 AEK (28 April 2016)
- Lowest attendance: 4 Doxa 2–0 Ayia Napa (25 January 2016)
- Total attendance: 460,105
- Average attendance: 1,901
- All statistics correct as of 15 May 2016.

The 2015–16 Cypriot First Division was the 77th season of the Cypriot top-level football league. It began on 22 August 2015 and ended on 15 May 2016. APOEL were the defending champions.

The league expanded from 12 to 14 teams this season, comprised eleven teams from the 2014–15 season and three promoted teams from the 2014–15 Second Division. APOEL were crowned champions for the 25th time and a fourth time in a row, securing the title after beating title rivals AEK Larnaca 2–0 at home on 28 April 2016.

== Teams ==
=== Promotion and relegation (pre-season) ===
Othellos Athienou was relegated at the end of the second-phase of the 2014–15 season after finishing in the last place of the relegation group table.

The relegated team was replaced by 2014–15 Second Division champions Enosis Neon Paralimni, runners-up Pafos FC and third-placed team Aris Limassol.

=== Stadia and locations ===
Locations of the 2015–16 Cypriot First Division teams.

Note: Table lists clubs in alphabetical order.

Team	Location	Stadium	Capacity
AEK	Larnaca	GSZ Stadium	13,032
AEL	Limassol	Tsirion Stadium	13,331
Anorthosis	Larnaca	Antonis Papadopoulos Stadium	10,230
APOEL	Nicosia	GSP Stadium	22,859
Apollon	Limassol	Tsirion Stadium	13,331
Aris	Limassol	Tsirion Stadium	13,331
Ayia Napa	Ayia Napa	Tasos Markou Stadium	5,800
Doxa	Peristerona	Makario Stadium	16,000
Enosis	Paralimni	Tasos Markou Stadium	5,800
Ermis	Aradippou	Ammochostos Stadium	5,500
Ethnikos	Achna, Famagusta	Dasaki Stadium	7,000
Nea Salamina	Larnaca	Ammochostos Stadium	5,500
Omonia	Nicosia	GSP Stadium	22,859
Pafos	Paphos	Pafiako Stadium	9,394

=== Personnel and kits ===
Note: Flags indicate national team as has been defined under FIFA eligibility rules. Players and Managers may hold more than one non-FIFA nationality.

Team	Head coach	Captain	Kit manufacturer	Shirt sponsor
AEK	(Cyprus) Demetris Demetriou (Caretaker)	(Spain) David Català	Puma	Cytavision
AEL	(Cyprus) Pambos Christodoulou	(Angola) Marco Airosa	Nike	Cytavision
Anorthosis	(Cyprus) Neophytos Larkou	(Cyprus) Christos Marangos	Macron	Cytamobile-Vodafone
APOEL	(Greece) Georgios Kostis (Caretaker)	(Cyprus) Constantinos Charalambides	Puma	Mora Thavmata
Apollon	(Portugal) Pedro Emanuel	(Cyprus) Giorgos Vasiliou	Puma	Cyta
Aris	(Cyprus) Kostas Kaiafas	(Cyprus) Christos Charalabous	Legea	Cytanet
Ayia Napa	(Cyprus) Panikos Protopapas (Caretaker)	(England) Michael Felgate	Eldera	Cyta
Doxa	(Cyprus) Loukas Hadjiloukas	(Brazil) Edmar	Joma	Cytanet
Enosis	(Belgium) Ronny Van Geneugden	(Bulgaria) Kostadin Bashov	Nike	Cyta
Ermis	(Cyprus) Nicos Panayiotou	(Cape Verde) Paulo Pina	Legea	Cyta
Ethnikos	(Serbia) Danilo Dončić	(Cyprus) Christos Poyiatzis	Nike	Cyta
Nea Salamina	(Greece) Giorgos Lagkaditis (Caretaker)	(Greece) Giannis Skopelitis	GEMS	Cytamobile-Vodafone
Omonia	(Serbia) Vladan Milojević	(Portugal) Nuno Assis	Nike	Cytamobile-Vodafone
Pafos	(Cyprus) Apostolos Makrides	(Cyprus) Giorgos Sielis	Pafos FC	Cyta

=== Managerial changes ===
Team	Outgoing manager	Manner of departure	Date of vacancy	Position in table	Incoming manager	Date of appointment
APOEL	(Brazil) Gustavo Manduca	End of tenure as caretaker	End of 2014–15 season	Pre-season	(Portugal) Domingos Paciência	21 May 2015
Aris	(Cyprus) Akis Agiomamitis	End of contract	End of 2014–15 season	Pre-season	(North Macedonia) Jane Nikolovski	3 June 2015
Doxa	(Cyprus) Nikos Andreou	End of contract	End of 2014–15 season	Pre-season	(Cyprus) Loukas Hadjiloukas	3 June 2015
Nea Salamina	(Cyprus) Floros Nicolaou	End of tenure as caretaker	End of 2014–15 season	Pre-season	(Netherlands) Jan de Jonge	9 June 2015
Apollon	(Netherlands) Ton Caanen	End of contract	End of 2014–15 season	Pre-season	(Portugal) Pedro Emanuel	9 June 2015
Ermis	(Cyprus) Michalis Markou	End of tenure as caretaker	End of 2014–15 season	Pre-season	(Greece) Pavlos Dermitzakis	12 June 2015
Aris	(North Macedonia) Jane Nikolovski	Resigned	18 July 2015	Pre-season	(Cyprus) Akis Agiomamitis	21 July 2015
APOEL	(Portugal) Domingos Paciência	Sacked	28 August 2015	1st	(Georgia (country)) Temur Ketsbaia	28 August 2015
Ermis	(Greece) Pavlos Dermitzakis	Sacked	3 September 2015	11th	(Cyprus) Apostolos Makrides	3 September 2015
Aris	(Cyprus) Akis Agiomamitis	Mutual consent	14 September 2015	13th	(Romania) Eugen Neagoe	15 September 2015
AEL	(Cyprus) Christakis Christoforou	Mutual consent	19 October 2015	10th	(Greece) Makis Chavos	27 October 2015
Ermis	(Cyprus) Apostolos Makrides	Resigned	22 October 2015	12th	(Cyprus) Nicos Panayiotou	22 October 2015
Omonia	(Cyprus) Kostas Kaiafas	Resigned	2 November 2015	5th	(Serbia) Vladan Milojević	11 November 2015
Enosis	(Greece) Nikos Karageorgiou	Mutual consent	5 November 2015	9th	(Belgium) Ronny Van Geneugden	10 November 2015
Pafos	(Cyprus) Sofoklis Sofokleous	Sacked	9 November 2015	9th	(Spain) José Manuel Roca	17 November 2015
Ethnikos	(North Macedonia) (Cyprus) Borce Gjurev	Resigned	23 November 2015	13th	(Serbia) Danilo Dončić	24 November 2015
Pafos	(Spain) José Manuel Roca	Mutual consent	14 December 2015	12th	(Cyprus) Apostolos Makrides	16 December 2015
Ayia Napa	(Cyprus) Giorgos Kosma	Mutual consent	28 January 2016	14th	(Cyprus) Antonis Mertakkas	28 January 2016
Aris	(Romania) Eugen Neagoe	Mutual consent	4 February 2016	8th	(Cyprus) Kostas Kaiafas	8 February 2016
AEL	(Greece) Makis Chavos	Sacked	7 February 2016	10th	(Cyprus) Pambos Christodoulou	8 February 2016
Ayia Napa	(Cyprus) Antonis Mertakkas	Resigned	14 February 2016	14th	(Cyprus) Panikos Protopapas (Caretaker)	16 February 2016
Anorthosis	(Netherlands) André Paus	Sacked	18 February 2016	3rd	(Serbia) Zoran Milinković	18 February 2016
Anorthosis	(Serbia) Zoran Milinković	Sacked	23 March 2016	5th	(Cyprus) Neophytos Larkou	23 March 2016
APOEL	(Georgia (country)) Temur Ketsbaia	Mutual consent	21 April 2016	1st	(Greece) Georgios Kostis (Caretaker)	21 April 2016
Nea Salamina	(Netherlands) Jan de Jonge	Mutual consent	22 April 2016	6th	(Greece) Giorgos Lagkaditis (Caretaker)	22 April 2016
AEK	(Spain) Thomas Christiansen	Sacked	29 April 2016	2nd	(Cyprus) Demetris Demetriou (Caretaker)	30 April 2016

== Regular season ==
=== League table ===
Pos	Team	Pld	W	D	L	GF	GA	GD	Pts	Qualification or relegation
1	APOEL	26	20	2	4	72	18	+54	62	Qualification for the championship round
2	AEK Larnaca	26	19	4	3	47	17	+30	61	Qualification for the championship round
3	Anorthosis Famagusta	26	15	7	4	48	22	+26	52	Qualification for the championship round
4	Omonia	26	14	7	5	46	24	+22	49 (Note: Head-to-head record: Omonia 0–0 Apollon, Apollon 0–0 Omonia.)	Qualification for the championship round
5	Apollon Limassol	26	14	7	5	41	24	+17	49	Qualification for the championship round
6	Nea Salamis Famagusta	26	8	9	9	37	52	−15	33	Qualification for the championship round
7	Aris Limassol	26	8	7	11	29	31	−2	31 (Note: Head-to-head record: AEL 1–2 Aris, Aris 0–1 AEL.)	Qualification for the relegation round
8	AEL Limassol	26	9	4	13	22	32	−10	31	Qualification for the relegation round
9	Doxa Katokopias	26	7	9	10	31	41	−10	30	Qualification for the relegation round
10	Pafos FC	26	6	9	11	35	47	−12	27	Qualification for the relegation round
11	Ethnikos Achna	26	5	9	12	27	43	−16	24 (Note: Head-to-head record: Ethnikos 2–2 Ermis, Ermis 1–2 Ethnikos.)	Qualification for the relegation round
12	Ermis Aradippou	26	6	6	14	22	40	−18	24	Qualification for the relegation round
13	Enosis Neon Paralimni (R)	26	4	8	14	28	47	−19	20	Relegation to the Cypriot Second Division
14	Ayia Napa (R)	26	0	6	20	17	64	−47	6	Relegation to the Cypriot Second Division

Source: UEFA, CFA, Soccerway
Rules for classification: 1) Points; 2) Head-to-head points; 3) Head-to-head goal difference; 4) Head-to-head goals scored; 5) Head-to-head away goals scored (only if two teams); 6) Goal difference; 7) Goals scored; 8) Play-off (only if deciding championship round, relegation round or relegation).
(R) Relegated

=== Results ===
Home \ Away	AEK	AEL	ANO	APOE	APOL	ARI	AYN	DOX	ENP	ERM	ETH	NSL	OMO	PAF
AEK Larnaca		0–2	1–0	2–2	6–1	2–1	3–1	2–0	2–1	2–0	1–0	1–2	2–1	3–0
AEL Limassol	0–1		0–1	0–1	0–2	1–2	1–0	4–0	0–2	1–0	1–0	0–2	2–1	0–0
Anorthosis Famagusta	1–1	2–0		1–2	3–2	2–1	2–2	2–1	2–0	4–0	3–0	2–1	0–0	5–1
APOEL	1–2	6–0	0–2		0–1	4–0	3–0	1–2	3–0	2–0	3–0	6–1	2–0	6–2
Apollon Limassol	0–0	1–0	3–0	0–1		2–1	4–0	2–1	2–1	0–0	5–2	3–0	0–0	3–1
Aris Limassol	0–1	0–1	0–0	1–2	2–2		2–0	1–1	2–1	1–1	2–0	2–0	0–1	1–0
Ayia Napa	1–3	0–1	1–7	0–1	0–3	0–4		2–2	0–2	0–1	2–3	1–3	1–2	1–1
Doxa Katokopias	0–3	2–1	1–1	0–1	1–3	2–1	2–0		2–1	2–1	1–1	1–2	0–1	1–3
Enosis Neon Paralimni	0–1	2–2	0–2	0–5	0–0	2–2	2–2	0–1		0–1	2–1	2–2	1–4	2–1
Ermis Aradippou	0–3	2–1	2–0	1–5	1–2	0–0	0–0	2–2	2–1		1–2	1–2	0–1	2–1
Ethnikos Achna	0–2	0–0	1–1	1–3	2–0	1–2	2–0	2–2	0–0	2–2		2–2	1–0	1–1
Nea Salamis Famagusta	0–0	1–2	1–3	0–9	2–0	0–0	2–2	0–0	3–1	3–2	2–2		0–2	1–1
Omonia Nicosia	3–1	4–2	0–0	2–2	0–0	2–1	4–0	1–1	2–2	1–0	2–1	5–3		6–0
Pafos FC	0–2	0–0	1–2	0–1	0–0	3–0	4–1	3–3	3–3	2–0	3–0	2–2	2–1	

Source: CFA
Legend: Blue = home team win; Yellow = draw; Red = away team win.

== Championship round ==
=== Table ===
Pos	Team	Pld	W	D	L	GF	GA	GD	Pts	Qualification
1	APOEL (C)	36	26	5	5	91	26	+65	83	Qualification for the Champions League second qualifying round
2	AEK Larnaca	36	23	6	7	61	34	+27	75	Qualification for the Europa League first qualifying round
3	Apollon Limassol	36	19	11	6	61	36	+25	68	Qualification for the Europa League third qualifying round (Note: Apollon Limassol qualified for the Europa League third qualifying round by winning the 2015–16 Cypriot Cup.)
4	Omonia	36	20	7	9	63	34	+29	67	Qualification for the Europa League first qualifying round
5	Anorthosis Famagusta	36	16	11	9	57	41	+16	59	
6	Nea Salamis Famagusta	36	9	10	17	44	72	−28	37	

Source: UEFA, CFA, Soccerway
Rules for classification: 1) Points; 2) Head-to-head points; 3) Head-to-head goal difference; 4) Head-to-head goals scored; 5) Head-to-head away goals scored (only if two teams); 6) Goal difference; 7) Goals scored; 8) Play-off (only if deciding champion or UEFA competitions).
(C) Champions

=== Results ===
Home \ Away	AEK	ANO	APOE	APOL	NSL	OMO
AEK Larnaca		3–2	0–3	2–2	2–0	1–3
Anorthosis Famagusta	0–1		1–1	1–1	1–1	0–3
APOEL	2–0	2–2		2–2	4–1	2–1
Apollon Limassol	2–2	4–1	1–0		2–1	1–2
Nea Salamis Famagusta	3–2	0–1	0–1	0–3		1–2
Omonia Nicosia	0–1	3–0	0–2	1–2	2–0	

Source: CFA
Legend: Blue = home team win; Yellow = draw; Red = away team win.

== Relegation round ==
=== Table ===
Pos	Team	Pld	W	D	L	GF	GA	GD	Pts	Relegation
7	AEL Limassol (Note: On 8 April 2016, AEL Limassol were deducted two points by Cyprus Football Association after failing to meet the financial criteria of UEFA.)	36	14	7	15	38	43	−5	47	
8	Ermis Aradippou	36	11	9	16	36	52	−16	42	
9	Doxa Katokopias	36	10	11	15	46	59	−13	41 (Note: Doxa ahead of Aris on head-to-head away goals scored: Doxa–Aris 2–1, Aris–Doxa 1–1, Doxa–Aris 1–1, Aris–Doxa 4–3.)	
10	Aris Limassol	36	10	11	15	43	46	−3	41	
11	Ethnikos Achna	36	9	12	15	43	57	−14	39	
12	Pafos FC (R)	36	8	12	16	41	58	−17	36	Relegation to the Cypriot Second Division

Source: UEFA, CFA, Soccerway
Rules for classification: 1) Points; 2) Head-to-head points; 3) Head-to-head goal difference; 4) Head-to-head goals scored; 5) Head-to-head away goals scored (only if two teams); 6) Goal difference; 7) Goals scored; 8) Play-off (only if deciding relegation).
(R) Relegated

=== Results ===
Home \ Away	AEL	ARI	DOX	ERM	ETH	PAF
AEL Limassol		2–2	0–1	3–1	5–2	1–0
Aris Limassol	0–1		4–3	3–0	2–2	0–0
Doxa Katokopias	1–2	1–1		2–2	1–2	3–1
Ermis Aradippou	1–1	3–1	3–1		1–1	1–0
Ethnikos Achna	2–0	2–1	1–2	0–1		3–0
Pafos FC	1–1	1–0	2–0	0–1	1–1	

Source: CFA
Legend: Blue = home team win; Yellow = draw; Red = away team win.

== Season statistics ==
=== Top scorers ===
Including matches played on 15 May 2016; Source: Cyprus Football Association

Rank	Player	Club	Goals
1	(Argentina) Fernando Cavenaghi	APOEL	19
1	(Brazil) André Alves	AEK	19
1	(Bulgaria) Dimitar Makriev	Nea Salamina	19
4	(South Africa) Dino Ndlovu	Anorthosis	17
5	(Argentina) Tomás De Vincenti	APOEL	15
5	(Republic of Ireland) Cillian Sheridan	Omonia	15
5	(Malta) André Schembri	Omonia	15
8	(Guinea) Alhassane Keita	Ermis	13
9	(Cyprus) Georgios Efrem	APOEL	11
9	(Netherlands) Nassir Maachi	Pafos	11

=== Hat-tricks ===
#	Player	For	Against	Result	Date
1.	(South Africa) Dino Ndlovu	Anorthosis	Nea Salamina	1–3	29 August 2015
2.	(Argentina) Fernando Cavenaghi	APOEL	AEL Limassol	6–0	17 October 2015
3.	(Croatia) Anton Maglica	Apollon	Pafos	3–1	20 February 2016

=== Scoring ===
- First goal of the season: 2 minutes and 40 seconds – (Cyprus) Koullis Pavlou (Nea Salamina) against Omonia (19:02 EET, 22 August 2015)
- Fastest goal of the season: 0 minutes and 34 seconds – (Cyprus) Nikos Englezou (AEK) against Enosis (26 September 2015)
- Latest goal of the season: 96 minutes and 20 seconds – (Ivory Coast) Joël Damahou (Pafos) against Nea Salamina (18 January 2016)
- First scored penalty kick of the season: 93 minutes and 38 seconds – (Republic of Ireland) Cillian Sheridan (Omonia) against Nea Salamina (20:48 EET, 22 August 2015)
- First own goal of the season: 73 minutes and 8 seconds – (Spain) Aritz López Garai (Doxa) for Ethnikos (20:28 EET, 23 August 2015)
- Most goals scored in a match by one player: 3 goals
  - (South Africa) Dino Ndlovu (Anorthosis) against Nea Salamina (29 August 2015)
  - (Argentina) Fernando Cavenaghi (APOEL) against AEL (17 October 2015)
  - (Croatia) Anton Maglica (Apollon) against Pafos (20 February 2016)
- Most scored goals in a single fixture – 30 goals (Fixture 8)
  - Fixture 8 results: Ayia Napa 0–3 Apollon, Omonia 6–0 Pafos, Anorthosis 4–0 Ermis, Ethnikos 0–2 AEK, Doxa 2–1 Enosis, AEL 1–2 Aris, Nea Salamina 0–9 APOEL.
- Highest scoring game: 9 goals
  - Nea Salamina 0–9 APOEL (26 October 2015)
- Largest winning margin: 9 goals
  - Nea Salamina 0–9 APOEL (26 October 2015)
- Most goals scored in a match by a single team: 9 goals
  - Nea Salamina 0–9 APOEL (26 October 2015)
- Most goals scored by a losing team: 3 goals
  - Omonia 5–3 Nea Salamina (22 August 2015)
  - Aris 4–3 Doxa (15 May 2016)

=== Discipline ===
- First yellow card of the season: 6 minutes – (Croatia) Ivan Ćurjurić for Nea Salamina against Omonia (19:06 EET, 22 August 2015)
- First red card of the season: 70 minutes – (Georgia (country)) Levan Khmaladze for Pafos against AEK (20:25 EET, 22 August 2015)
- Most yellow cards in a single match: 12
  - AEK 1–2 Nea Salamina – 5 for AEK (Toño Ramírez (2), Albert Serrán (2), Jorge Monteiro) and 7 for Nea Salamina (Marko Andić, Aldo Adorno, China (2), Ioannis Kousoulos, Giannis Skopelitis, Dimitar Makriev) (19 October 2015)
  - Omonia 0–2 APOEL – 6 for Omonia (Ivan Runje, Giorgos Economides, Renato Margaça, Nuno Assis, George Florescu, Carlitos) and 6 for APOEL (Iñaki Astiz, Nuno Morais, Tomás De Vincenti (2), Constantinos Charalambides, Giannis Gianniotas) (23 April 2016)
- Most red cards in a single match: 3
  - AEK 1–2 Nea Salamina – 2 for AEK (Albert Serrán, Toño Ramírez) and 1 for Nea Salamina (China) (19 October 2015)

== Attendances ==
#	Club	Average
1	APOEL	7,873
2	Omonoia	6,787
3	Anorthosis	4,811
4	AEK Larnaca	3,238
5	Apollon Limassol	2,702
6	Pafos	1,884
7	AEL	1,809
8	Nea Salamina	1,528
9	ENP	996
10	Ermis	708
11	Aris Limassol	674
12	Ethnikos Achnas	669
13	Doxa Katokopias	467
14	Ayia Napa	442

== Sources ==
- "2015/16 Cypriot First Division". Rec.Sport.Soccer Statistics Foundation. 14 January 2016.
