= 2014–15 Cypriot First Division =

Cypriot First Division
- Season: 2014–15
- Champions: APOEL; 24th title
- Relegated: Othellos
- Champions League: APOEL
- Europa League: AEK; Apollon; Omonia
- Matches: 192
- Goals: 503 (2.62 per match)
- Top goalscorer: Mickaël Poté (17 goals)
- Biggest home win: Nea Salamina 6–0 Doxa (16 May 2015); Omonia 7–1 Ermis (17 May 2015)
- Biggest away win: Doxa 0–4 AEL (14 September 2014); Ethnikos 0–4 APOEL (1 November 2014); Doxa 0–4 Anorthosis (22 November 2014); Ermis 0–4 AEK (10 January 2015); Ayia Napa 1–5 Anorthosis (11 January 2015); Ermis 0–4 AEK (21 March 2015); AEL 0–4 Doxa (26 April 2015); Doxa 1–5 Ethnikos (23 May 2015)
- Highest scoring: APOEL 4–4 AEK (15 December 2014); Omonia 7–1 Ermis (17 May 2015)
- Longest winning run: 5 matches Ermis; Anorthosis; Ethnikos
- Longest unbeaten run: 13 matches APOEL
- Longest winless run: 12 matches Othellos
- Longest losing run: 6 matches Doxa
- Highest attendance: 15,562; APOEL 1–1 AEK Larnaca (16 May 2015)
- Lowest attendance: 7 Doxa 1–3 Ermis (7 January 2015)
- Total attendance: 413,011
- Average attendance: 2,151
- All statistics correct as of 24 May 2015.

The 2014–15 Cypriot First Division was the 76th season of the Cypriot top-level football league. It began on 23 August 2014 and ended on 24 May 2015. APOEL were the defending champions.

The league this edition was reduced from 14 to 12 teams: ten teams from the 2013–14 season and two promoted teams from the 2013–14 B1 Division. APOEL won the league for a 24th successive time and a third consecutive season, after 62 points.

== Teams ==
=== Promotion and relegation (pre-season) ===
Enosis Neon Paralimni and Alki Larnaca were relegated at the end of the first stage of the 2013–14 season after finishing in the bottom two places of the table. They were joined by Aris Limassol and AEK Kouklia, who finished at the bottom of the second-phase relegation group.

The relegated teams were replaced by 2013–14 B1 Division champions Ayia Napa and runners-up Othellos Athienou.

=== Stadia and locations ===
Location of clubs in 2014–15 Cypriot First Division

Note: Table lists clubs in alphabetical order.

Club	Location	Venue	Capacity
AEK	Larnaca	GSZ Stadium	13,032
AEL	Limassol	Tsirion Stadium	13,331
Anorthosis	Larnaca	Antonis Papadopoulos Stadium	10,230
APOEL	Nicosia	GSP Stadium	22,859
Apollon	Limassol	Tsirion Stadium	13,331
Ayia Napa	Ayia Napa	Tasos Markou Stadium	5,800
Doxa	Peristerona	Makario Stadium	16,000
Ermis	Aradippou	Ammochostos Stadium (Note: Ermis Aradippou was using Dasaki Stadium for his home matches from the beginning of the season until 25 February 2015.)	5,500
Ethnikos	Achna, Famagusta	Dasaki Stadium	7,000
Nea Salamina	Larnaca	Ammochostos Stadium	5,500
Omonia	Nicosia	GSP Stadium	22,859
Othellos	Athienou, Larnaca	Antonis Papadopoulos Stadium	10,230

=== Personnel and kits ===
Note: Flags indicate national team as has been defined under FIFA eligibility rules. Players and Managers may hold more than one non-FIFA nationality.

Team	Head coach	Captain	Kit manufacturer	Shirt sponsor
AEK	(Spain) Thomas Christiansen	(Greece) Giannis Skopelitis	Umbro	Cytavision
AEL	(Cyprus) Christakis Christoforou	(Cyprus) Marios Nicolaou	Nike	Cytavision
Anorthosis	(Netherlands) André Paus	(Cyprus) Christos Marangos	Macron	Cytamobile-Vodafone
APOEL	(Brazil) Gustavo Manduca (Caretaker)	(Cyprus) Constantinos Charalambides	Puma	MTN
Apollon	(Netherlands) Ton Caanen	(Cyprus) Giorgos Merkis	Macron	Cyta
Ayia Napa	(Cyprus) Giorgos Kosma	(North Macedonia) Bojan Markovski	Sportika	Cyta
Doxa	(Cyprus) Nikos Andreou	(Portugal) Ricardo Fernandes	Legea	Cytanet
Ermis	(Cyprus) Michalis Markou (Caretaker)	(Cyprus) Andreas Papathanasiou	Legea	Cyta
Ethnikos	(North Macedonia) Borce Gjurev	(Cyprus) Christos Poyiatzis	Mitre	Cyta
Nea Salamina	(Cyprus) Floros Nicolaou (Caretaker)	(Spain) Diego León	GEMS	Cytamobile-Vodafone
Omonia	(Cyprus) Kostas Kaiafas	(Portugal) Nuno Assis	Nike	Cytamobile-Vodafone
Othellos	(Cyprus) Costas Sakkas	(Cyprus) Andreas Vasiliou	Joma	Kleima

=== Managerial changes ===
Team	Outgoing manager	Manner of departure	Date of vacancy	Position in table	Incoming manager	Date of appointment
Doxa	(Cyprus) Demetris Ioannou	Sacked	1 September 2014	10th	(Serbia) Slobodan Krčmarević	8 September 2014
Ermis	(Cyprus) Nicos Panayiotou	Sacked	7 September 2014	6th	(Cyprus) Nikodimos Papavasiliou	8 September 2014
Ayia Napa	(Cyprus) Nikos Andronikou	Mutual consent	30 September 2014	12th	(Cyprus) Giorgos Kosma	23 October 2014
Apollon	(Cyprus) Christakis Christoforou	Sacked	8 October 2014	2nd	(Romania) Ioan Andone	16 October 2014
AEL	(Bulgaria) Ivaylo Petev	Sacked	17 November 2014	5th	(Cyprus) Christakis Christoforou	17 November 2014
Nea Salamina	(Cyprus) Neophytos Larkou	Mutual consent	16 December 2014	9th	(Cyprus) Nicos Panayiotou	16 December 2014
APOEL	(Greece) Georgios Donis	Mutual consent	6 January 2015	1st	(Germany) Thorsten Fink	10 January 2015
Ermis	(Cyprus) Nikodimos Papavasiliou	Sacked	2 February 2015	6th	(Netherlands) Mitchell van der Gaag	5 February 2015
Doxa	(Serbia) Slobodan Krčmarević	Mutual consent	15 February 2015	11th	(Cyprus) Nikos Andreou	4 March 2015
Ermis	(Netherlands) Mitchell van der Gaag	Mutual consent	24 March 2015	6th	(Cyprus) Ioannis Okkas	24 March 2015
Ethnikos	(Cyprus) Apostolos Makrides	Resigned	24 March 2015	9th	(North Macedonia) (Cyprus) Borce Gjurev	28 March 2015
Apollon	(Romania) Ioan Andone	Sacked	8 April 2015	1st	(Netherlands) Ton Caanen	9 April 2015
Nea Salamina	(Cyprus) Nicos Panayiotou	Mutual consent	4 May 2015	9th	(Cyprus) Floros Nicolaou (Caretaker)	5 May 2015
APOEL	(Germany) Thorsten Fink	Mutual consent	11 May 2015	1st	(Brazil) Gustavo Manduca (Caretaker)	11 May 2015
Ermis	(Cyprus) Ioannis Okkas	Sacked	11 May 2015	6th	(Cyprus) Michalis Markou (Caretaker)	14 May 2015

== First phase ==
=== League table ===
Pos	Team	Pld	W	D	L	GF	GA	GD	Pts	Qualification
1	Apollon Limassol	22	15	3	4	49	26	+23	48	Qualification to championship group
2	APOEL	22	13	7	2	34	13	+21	46	Qualification to championship group
3	Omonia Nicosia	22	12	3	7	32	22	+10	39 (Note: OMO 0–1 AEK; AEK 1–3 OMO)	Qualification to championship group
4	AEK Larnaca	22	11	6	5	41	23	+18	39	Qualification to championship group
5	Anorthosis Famagusta	22	12	2	8	32	22	+10	38	Qualification to championship group
6	Ermis Aradippou	22	10	5	7	29	28	+1	35	Qualification to championship group
7	AEL Limassol	22	7	9	6	33	26	+7	30	Qualification to relegation group
8	Ethnikos Achna	22	5	7	10	18	37	−19	22	Qualification to relegation group
9	Nea Salamis Famagusta	22	4	7	11	16	29	−13	19	Qualification to relegation group
10	Ayia Napa	22	3	7	12	21	42	−21	16 (Note: AYN 1–0 OTH; OTH 2–1 AYN)	Qualification to relegation group
11	Othellos Athienou	22	3	7	12	13	26	−13	16	Qualification to relegation group
12	Doxa Katokopias	22	3	5	14	14	38	−24	14	Qualification to relegation group

Source: UEFA, CFA
Rules for classification: 1) points; 2) head-to-head points; 3) head-to-head goal difference; 4) head-to-head away goals scored; 5) goal difference; 6) number of goals scored

=== Results ===
Home \ Away	AEK	AEL	ANO	APOE	APOL	AYN	DOX	ERM	ETH	NSL	OMO	OTH
AEK Larnaca		1–1	1–0	0–2	3–1	2–0	1–0	0–0	5–0	2–0	1–3	2–2
AEL Limassol	1–0		4–1	2–1	1–2	3–0	0–0	2–3	2–2	1–1	0–1	1–0
Anorthosis Famagusta	2–1	2–1		0–1	0–1	4–1	1–0	2–0	0–0	1–0	2–1	1–0
APOEL	4–4	0–0	2–0		1–0	1–1	0–0	1–0	4–0	1–0	1–0	1–1
Apollon Limassol	2–5	3–3	2–0	0–0		1–0	2–0	3–2	3–0	5–0	3–0	4–0
Ayia Napa	1–2	1–1	1–5	1–3	2–5		2–2	2–1	0–0	1–1	1–3	1–0
Doxa Katokopias	1–4	0–4	0–4	0–2	1–3	1–0		0–2	3–1	1–1	0–1	0–0
Ermis Aradippou	0–4	2–2	1–0	2–1	1–3	2–2	2–1		2–1	3–1	1–1	1–0
Ethnikos Achna	2–1	4–2	0–0	0–4	0–2	2–1	1–2	0–0		1–1	1–0	0–0
Nea Salamis Famagusta	0–0	0–2	2–3	0–1	4–0	0–0	1–0	0–1	2–1		1–1	0–1
Omonia Nicosia	0–1	2–0	3–2	1–1	1–2	1–2	4–2	2–1	2–0	3–0		1–0
Othellos Athienou	1–1	0–0	0–2	1–2	2–2	2–1	2–0	0–2	1–2	0–1	0–1	

Source: CFA
Legend: Blue = home team win; Yellow = draw; Red = away team win.

== Second phase ==
=== Championship group ===
==== Table ====
Pos	Team	Pld	W	D	L	GF	GA	GD	Pts	Qualification
1	APOEL (C)	32	17	11	4	52	26	+26	62	Qualification to Champions League second qualifying round
2	AEK Larnaca	32	17	8	7	56	31	+25	59 (Note: AEK: 9 pts; APOL: 3 pts)	Qualification to Europa League third qualifying round (Note: Since Cypriot cup winners APOEL qualified for the 2015–16 UEFA Champions League, the fourth placed team would also qualify for the first qualifying round of the 2015–16 UEFA Europa League.)
3	Apollon Limassol	32	18	5	9	59	41	+18	59	Qualification to Europa League first qualifying round
4	Omonia Nicosia	32	17	5	10	52	34	+18	56	Qualification to Europa League first qualifying round
5	Anorthosis Famagusta	32	16	4	12	50	37	+13	52	
6	Ermis Aradippou	32	11	7	14	38	55	−17	40	

Source: CFA, UEFA
Rules for classification: 1) points; 2) head-to-head points; 3) head-to-head goal difference; 4) head-to-head goals scored; 5) goal difference; 6) number of goals scored.
(C) Champions

==== Results ====
Home \ Away	AEK	ANO	APOE	APOL	ERM	OMO
AEK Larnaca		2–0	1–0	2–0	2–1	2–1
Anorthosis Famagusta	3–0		3–3	3–1	3–1	1–3
APOEL	1–1	1–0		2–2	3–0	3–2
Apollon Limassol	1–0	1–3	1–0		2–2	2–1
Ermis Aradippou	0–4	1–1	2–4	1–0		0–1
Omonia Nicosia	1–1	2–1	1–1	1–0	7–1	

Source: CFA
Legend: Blue = home team win; Yellow = draw; Red = away team win.

=== Relegation group ===
==== Table ====
Pos	Team	Pld	W	D	L	GF	GA	GD	Pts	Relegation
7	Ethnikos Achna	32	11	8	13	36	49	−13	41	
8	AEL Limassol	32	9	12	11	42	42	0	39	
9	Nea Salamis Famagusta	32	9	9	14	31	37	−6	36	
10	Ayia Napa	32	6	12	14	32	54	−22	30	
11	Doxa Katokopias	32	7	7	18	29	55	−26	28	
12	Othellos Athienou (R)	32	5	10	17	26	42	−16	25	Relegation to Cypriot Second Division

Source: CFA, UEFA
Rules for classification: 1) points; 2) head-to-head points; 3) head-to-head goal difference; 4) head-to-head goals scored; 5) goal difference; 6) number of goals scored.
(R) Relegated

==== Results ====
Home \ Away	AEL	AYN	DOX	ETH	NSL	OTH
AEL Limassol		2–2	0–4	1–2	2–0	0–1
Ayia Napa	1–0		0–0	1–0	0–0	2–2
Doxa Katokopias	1–2	0–1		1–5	3–0	3–3
Ethnikos Achna	1–1	3–2	0–2		2–1	3–1
Nea Salamis Famagusta	1–1	3–0	6–0	1–0		1–0
Othellos Athienou	3–0	2–2	0–1	1–2	0–2	

Source: CFA
Legend: Blue = home team win; Yellow = draw; Red = away team win.

== Season statistics ==
=== Top scorers ===
Including matches played on 24 May 2015; Source: Cyprus Football Association

Rank	Player	Club	Goals
1	(Benin) Mickaël Poté	Omonia	17
2	(Nigeria) Ifeanyi Onyilo	Ermis	15
3	(Algeria) Rafik Djebbour	APOEL	14
3	(Greece) Fotios Papoulis	Apollon	14
5	(Cyprus) Andreas Makris	Anorthosis	13
6	(Brazil) Valdo	Ethnikos	11
7	(Brazil) Ricardo Lobo	Doxa	10
7	(Ivory Coast) Abraham Gneki Guié	Apollon	10
7	(Cyprus) Nestoras Mitidis	AEK	10
7	(Brazil) Thiago	Othellos	10

=== Hat-tricks ===
#	Player	For	Against	Result	Date
1.	(Brazil) Ricardo Lobo	Doxa	AEL	0–4	26 April 2015

=== Scoring ===
- First goal of the season: 54 minutes and 31 seconds – (Spain) Luis Morán (Ermis) against Doxa (18:09 EET, 23 August 2014)
- Fastest goal of the season: 42 seconds – (Brazil) Juninho (Ethnikos) against AEL (22 March 2015)
- Latest goal of the season: 99 minutes and 6 seconds – (Brazil) Marcos De Azevedo (Ermis) against Doxa (7 December 2014)
- First scored penalty kick of the season: 62 minutes and 20 seconds – (Spain) Joan Tomàs (AEK) against Apollon (20:17 EET, 24 August 2014)
- First own goal of the season: 5 minutes and 1 seconds – (Greece) Stavros Stathakis (Ayia Napa) for Anorthosis (20:05 EET, 27 September 2014)
- Most goals scored in a match by one player: 3 goals
  - (Brazil) Ricardo Lobo (Doxa) against AEL (26 April 2015)
- Most scored goals in a single fixture – 28 goals (Fixture 31)
  - Fixture 31 results: Othellos 3–0 AEL, Ethnikos 3–2 Ayia Napa, Nea Salamina 6–0 Doxa, Anorthosis 3–1 Apollon, APOEL 1–1 AEK, Omonia 7–1 Ermis.
- Highest scoring game: 8 goals
  - APOEL 4–4 AEK (15 December 2014)
  - Omonia 7–1 Ermis (17 May 2015)
- Largest winning margin: 6 goals
  - Nea Salamina 6–0 Doxa (16 May 2015)
  - Omonia 7–1 Ermis (17 May 2015)
- Most goals scored in a match by a single team: 7 goals
  - Omonia 7–1 Ermis (17 May 2015)
- Most goals scored by a losing team: 2 goals
  - Apollon 2–5 AEK (24 August 2014)
  - Omonia 3–2 Anorthosis (1 September 2014)
  - AEL 2–3 Ermis (2 November 2014)
  - Nea Salamina 2–3 Anorthosis (3 November 2014)
  - Ethnikos 4–2 AEL (14 December 2014)
  - Apollon 3–2 Ermis (15 December 2014)
  - Ayia Napa 2–5 Apollon (15 December 2014)
  - Omonia 4–2 Doxa (1 February 2015)
  - APOEL 3–2 Omonia (2 May 2015)
  - Ethnikos 3–2 Ayia Napa (16 May 2015)
  - Ermis 2–4 APOEL (24 May 2015)

=== Discipline ===
- First yellow card of the season: 44 minutes – (Cape Verde) Paulo Pina for Ermis against Doxa (17:44 EET, 23 August 2014)
- First red card of the season: 50 minutes – (Serbia) Milan Stepanov for Omonia against Nea Salamina (21:05 EET, 14 September 2014)
- Most yellow cards in a single match: 14
  - Apollon 3–3 AEL – 7 for Apollon (Gastón Sangoy (2), Luka Stojanović (2), Dustley Mulder, Jan Rezek, Giorgos Merkis) and 7 for AEL (Luciano Bebê (2), Valentinos Sielis, Calo, Diallo Guidileye, Georgios Eleftheriou, Andreas Stavrou) (4 January 2015)
- Most red cards in a single match: 3
  - Apollon 3–3 AEL – 2 for Apollon (Gastón Sangoy, Luka Stojanović) and 1 for AEL (Luciano Bebê) (4 January 2015)

== Attendances ==
#	Club	Average
1	Omonoia	8,168
2	APOEL	8,071
3	Anorthosis	4,644
4	Apollon Limassol	4,369
5	AEK Larnaca	3,094
6	AEL	1,611
7	Ermis	1,488
8	Nea Salamina	1,056
9	Othellos	683
10	Ethnikos Achnas	441
11	Ayia Napa	428
12	Doxa Katokopias	175

== Sources ==
- "2014/15 Cypriot First Division". Rec.Sport.Soccer Statistics Foundation. 14 January 2016.
