= 2016–17 Cypriot First Division =

Cyta Championship
- Season: 2016–17
- Champions: APOEL; 26th title
- Relegated: Karmiotissa; Anagennisi; AEZ
- Champions League: APOEL
- Europa League: AEK; Apollon; AEL
- Matches: 242
- Goals: 696 (2.88 per match)
- Top goalscorer: Matt Derbyshire (24 goals)
- Biggest home win: APOEL 7–0 AEZ (22 January 2017)
- Biggest away win: Karmiotissa 0–6 Apollon (20 November 2016)
- Highest scoring: Ethnikos 5–3 Anagennisi (1 October 2016); Karmiotissa 5–3 Ethnikos (12 March 2017)
- Longest winning run: 8 matches AEK; Apollon
- Longest unbeaten run: 22 matches Apollon
- Longest winless run: 26 matches Anagennisi
- Longest losing run: 9 matches Anagennisi
- Highest attendance: 14,841; APOEL 0–0 AEK (7 May 2017)
- Lowest attendance: 2 AEZ 0–4 Ermis (18 February 2017)
- Total attendance: 403,207
- Average attendance: 1,666
- All statistics correct as of 21 May 2017.

The 2016–17 Cypriot First Division was the 78th season of the Cypriot top-level football league. The season began on 20 August 2016 and ended on 21 May 2017. The fixtures were announced on 7 July 2016. APOEL were the defending champions.

APOEL were crowned champions for the 26th time and a fifth time in a row, securing the title after beating title arch-rivals Omonia 3–1 at the GSP Stadium on 13 May 2017.

== Teams ==
=== Promotion and relegation (pre-season) ===
Enosis Neon Paralimni and Ayia Napa were relegated at the end of the first-phase of the 2015–16 season after finishing in the bottom two places of the table. They were joined by Pafos FC, who finished at the bottom of the second-phase relegation group.

The relegated teams were replaced by 2015–16 Second Division champions Karmiotissa, runners-up AEZ Zakakiou and third-placed team Anagennisi Deryneia.

=== Stadia and locations ===
Locations of the 2016–17 Cypriot First Division teams.

Note: Table lists clubs in alphabetical order.

Team	Location	Stadium	Capacity
AEK	Larnaca	AEK Arena	7,400
AEL	Limassol	Tsirion Stadium	13,331
AEZ	Zakaki, Limassol	Pafiako Stadium	9,394
Anagennisi	Deryneia, Famagusta	Tasos Markou Stadium	5,800
Anorthosis	Larnaca	Antonis Papadopoulos Stadium	10,230
APOEL	Nicosia	GSP Stadium	22,859
Apollon	Limassol	Tsirion Stadium	13,331
Aris	Limassol	Tsirion Stadium	13,331
Doxa	Peristerona, Nicosia	Makario Stadium	16,000
Ermis	Aradippou, Larnaca	Antonis Papadopoulos Stadium	10,230
Ethnikos	Achna, Famagusta	Dasaki Stadium	7,000
Karmiotissa	Pano Polemidia, Limassol	GSZ Stadium	13,032
Nea Salamina	Larnaca	Ammochostos Stadium	5,500
Omonia	Nicosia	GSP Stadium	22,859

=== Personnel and kits ===
Note: Flags indicate national team as has been defined under FIFA eligibility rules. Players and Managers may hold more than one non-FIFA nationality.

Team	Head coach	Captain	Kit manufacturer	Shirt sponsor
AEK	(Spain) Imanol Idiakez	(Spain) David Català	Puma	A.J.K.
AEL	(Portugal) Bruno Baltazar	(Cyprus) Marios Nicolaou	Nike	Kepaky
AEZ	(Cyprus) Demetris Demetriou	(Cyprus) Andreas Mammides	Luanvi	CRI Group
Anagennisi	(Cyprus) Zouvanis Zouvani	(Cyprus) Giorgos Giannakou	Eldera	Kymco
Anorthosis	(Israel) Ronny Levy	(Brazil) João Victor	Macron	Olympia
APOEL	(Spain) Thomas Christiansen	(Cyprus) Nektarios Alexandrou	Nike	Pari-Match
Apollon	(Cyprus) Sofronis Avgousti	(Cyprus) Giorgos Vasiliou	Puma	Carabao
Aris	(Cyprus) Nikolas Martides	(Cyprus) Christos Theophilou	Nike	Europcar
Doxa	(Cyprus) Loukas Hadjiloukas	(Brazil) Edmar	Joma	Murphy's
Ermis	(Spain) Carlos Corberán	(Romania) Cristian Sîrghi	Legea	Mybet
Ethnikos	(Lithuania) Valdas Ivanauskas	(Cyprus) Christos Poyiatzis	Legea	—
Karmiotissa	(Cyprus) Liasos Louka	(Greece) Giannis Taralidis	GEMS	MoneySafe
Nea Salamina	(Portugal) Toni Conceição	(Greece) Giannis Skopelitis	GEMS	Vitex
Omonia	(Cyprus) Ioakim Ioakim (caretaker)	(Portugal) Renato Margaça	Puma	Gree

=== Managerial changes ===
Team	Outgoing manager	Manner of departure	Date of vacancy	Position in table	Incoming manager	Date of appointment
Nea Salamina	(Greece) Giorgos Lagkaditis	End of tenure as caretaker	End of 2015–16 season	Pre-season	(Romania) Eugen Neagoe	6 May 2016
Anorthosis	(Cyprus) Neophytos Larkou	End of contract	End of 2015–16 season	Pre-season	(Spain) Antonio Puche	17 May 2016
APOEL	(Greece) Georgios Kostis	End of tenure as caretaker	End of 2015–16 season	Pre-season	(Spain) Thomas Christiansen	1 June 2016
AEK	(Cyprus) Demetris Demetriou	End of tenure as caretaker	End of 2015–16 season	Pre-season	(Spain) Imanol Idiakez	31 May 2016
Omonia	(Serbia) Vladan Milojević	End of contract	End of 2015–16 season	Pre-season	(England) John Carver	4 June 2016
Aris	(Cyprus) Kostas Kaiafas	End of contract	End of 2015–16 season	Pre-season	(Greece) Thalis Theodoridis	24 June 2016
Nea Salamina	(Romania) Eugen Neagoe	Sacked	19 September 2016	11th	(Greece) Staikos Vergetis	20 September 2016
Ethnikos	(Serbia) Danilo Dončić	Sacked	28 September 2016	14th	(Lithuania) Valdas Ivanauskas	4 October 2016
Anorthosis	(Spain) Antonio Puche	Sacked	18 October 2016	8th	(Israel) Ronny Levy	26 October 2016
Anagennisi	(Cyprus) Adamos Adamou	Resigned	18 October 2016	14th	(Cyprus) Savvas Poursaitidis	23 October 2016
Aris	(Greece) Thalis Theodoridis	Sacked	24 October 2016	13th	(Belgium) Frederik Vanderbiest	1 November 2016
AEZ	(Cyprus) Nikolas Martides	Resigned	16 November 2016	11th	(Cyprus) Demetris Demetriou	12 December 2016
Doxa	(Cyprus) Loukas Hadjiloukas	Resigned	28 November 2016	13th	(Spain) Carlos Corberán	29 November 2016
Apollon	(Portugal) Pedro Emanuel	Sacked	11 December 2016	4th	(Cyprus) Sofronis Avgousti	16 December 2016
Aris	(Belgium) Frederik Vanderbiest	Resigned	3 January 2017	11th	(Cyprus) Nikolas Martides	4 January 2017
Ermis	(Cyprus) Nicos Panayiotou	Mutual consent	9 January 2017	6th	(Cyprus) Giorgos Kosma	9 January 2017
Doxa	(Spain) Carlos Corberán	Sacked	24 January 2017	12th	(Cyprus) Savvas Poursaitidis	25 January 2017
Anagennisi	(Cyprus) Savvas Poursaitidis	Signed by Doxa	25 January 2017	14th	(Cyprus) Zouvanis Zouvani	25 January 2017
Ermis	(Cyprus) Giorgos Kosma	Sacked	28 January 2017	6th	(Spain) Carlos Corberán	30 January 2017
Omonia	(England) John Carver	Mutual consent	23 February 2017	5th	(Cyprus) Ioakim Ioakim (caretaker)	23 February 2017
Nea Salamina	(Greece) Staikos Vergetis	Resigned	6 March 2017	8th	(Portugal) Toni Conceição	16 March 2017
AEL	(Cyprus) Pambos Christodoulou	Mutual consent	7 March 2017	4th	(Cyprus) Dionysis Dionysiou	7 March 2017
AEL	(Cyprus) Dionysis Dionysiou	Mutual consent	22 March 2017	5th	(Portugal) Bruno Baltazar	22 March 2017
Doxa	(Cyprus) Savvas Poursaitidis	Resigned	29 April 2017	12th	(Cyprus) Loukas Hadjiloukas	2 May 2017

== Regular season ==
=== League table ===
Pos	Team	Pld	W	D	L	GF	GA	GD	Pts	Qualification or relegation
1	APOEL	26	19	5	2	62	16	+46	62	Qualification for the championship round
2	AEK Larnaca	26	17	7	2	54	19	+35	58	Qualification for the championship round
3	Apollon Limassol	26	17	6	3	56	19	+37	57	Qualification for the championship round
4	AEL Limassol	26	15	6	5	40	22	+18	51	Qualification for the championship round
5	Omonia	26	15	5	6	56	37	+19	50	Qualification for the championship round
6	Anorthosis Famagusta	26	10	9	7	39	27	+12	39	Qualification for the championship round
7	Ermis Aradippou	26	10	5	11	35	41	−6	35	Qualification for the relegation round
8	Nea Salamis Famagusta	26	8	7	11	22	33	−11	31	Qualification for the relegation round
9	Ethnikos Achna	26	8	6	12	42	46	−4	30	Qualification for the relegation round
10	Karmiotissa Pano Polemidion	26	7	6	13	30	53	−23	27	Qualification for the relegation round
11	Aris Limassol	26	6	6	14	30	52	−22	24	Qualification for the relegation round
12	Doxa Katokopias	26	5	5	16	20	38	−18	20	Qualification for the relegation round
13	Anagennisi Deryneia (R)	26	0	7	19	18	58	−40	7	Relegation to the Cypriot Second Division
14	AEZ Zakakiou (Note: AEZ Zakakiou were deducted six points for suspicious betting activity.) (R)	26	1	8	17	20	63	−43	5	Relegation to the Cypriot Second Division

Source: CFA (in Greek), UEFA, Soccerway
Rules for classification: 1) Points; 2) Head-to-head points; 3) Head-to-head goal difference; 4) Head-to-head goals scored; 5) Head-to-head away goals scored (only if two teams); 6) Goal difference; 7) Goals scored; 8) Play-off (only if deciding championship round, relegation round or relegation).
(R) Relegated

=== Results ===
Home \ Away	AEK	AEL	AEZ	AND	ANO	APOE	APOL	ARI	DOX	ERM	ETH	KAR	NSL	OMO
AEK Larnaca	—	2–1	1–1	6–0	4–1	1–1	1–3	4–0	2–0	1–0	1–0	3–0	2–0	4–2
AEL Limassol	1–1	—	1–1	1–0	0–0	1–0	2–1	3–0	1–0	1–2	0–0	4–1	3–0	1–0
AEZ Zakakiou	2–5	0–3	—	1–1	0–2	1–4	0–4	2–3	0–4	0–4	3–1	3–3	1–5	0–1
Anagennisi Deryneia	0–0	1–3	0–0	—	1–2	2–4	0–1	1–2	0–1	2–2	2–3	0–1	0–1	2–2
Anorthosis Famagusta	0–1	0–0	2–2	3–0	—	0–0	0–0	2–0	3–0	2–2	4–2	0–1	0–0	2–2
APOEL	1–1	3–0	7–0	2–0	2–1	—	1–1	5–0	2–0	3–0	2–0	4–1	1–0	2–1
Apollon Limassol	0–1	2–0	2–1	4–0	1–1	2–0	—	0–0	3–1	3–0	3–2	3–0	1–1	2–1
Aris Limassol	1–1	0–3	0–0	4–0	1–2	0–3	1–4	—	4–0	0–2	3–1	1–1	1–2	2–4
Doxa Katokopias	1–1	1–3	1–0	0–0	0–2	0–2	0–1	3–1	—	1–2	0–0	1–2	0–0	2–3
Ermis Aradippou	2–3	0–1	2–1	1–0	1–4	1–1	3–2	1–2	1–0	—	2–1	2–0	1–2	2–2
Ethnikos Achna	0–3	2–2	3–1	5–3	2–1	2–3	2–2	2–0	2–0	3–1	—	4–2	0–0	1–2
Karmiotissa	0–3	0–1	0–0	2–2	1–4	0–1	0–6	3–3	1–0	3–0	2–2	—	1–0	0–1
Nea Salamis Famagusta	0–1	1–3	2–0	2–0	2–1	0–4	0–3	0–0	1–3	0–0	1–0	1–3	—	1–1
Omonia Nicosia	2–1	4–1	2–0	5–1	2–0	1–4	1–2	3–1	1–1	3–1	3–2	4–2	3–0	—

Source: Cyprus Football Association (in Greek)
Legend: Blue = home team win; Yellow = draw; Red = away team win.
For upcoming matches, an "a" indicates there is an article about the rivalry between the two participants.

=== Positions by round ===
The table lists the positions of teams after each week of matches.

Qualification to Championship round
Qualification to Relegation round
Relegation to 2017–18 Cypriot Second Division

Team ╲ Round	1	2	3	4	5	6	7	8	9	10	11	12	13	14	15	16	17	18	19	20	21	22	23	24	25	26
APOEL	9	3	2	2	2	2	2	2	2	2	2	2	2	1	3	2	1	1	1	1	1	1	1	1	1	1
AEK	4	1	1	1	1	1	1	1	1	1	1	1	1	2	1	1	3	2	2	2	2	4	4	3	3	2
Apollon	1	4	3	5	6	5	6	5	5	5	5	5	4	4	4	4	4	4	4	4	4	3	3	2	2	3
AEL	5	2	4	3	3	3	3	3	3	3	3	3	3	3	2	3	2	3	3	3	3	2	2	4	4	4
Omonia	3	5	5	4	4	4	4	4	4	4	4	4	5	5	5	5	5	5	5	5	5	5	5	5	5	5
Anorthosis	8	9	6	6	7	7	8	8	8	7	7	8	9	10	10	9	8	8	9	9	8	6	6	6	6	6
Ermis	11	13	8	7	5	6	5	6	6	6	6	6	6	6	6	6	6	7	6	6	6	7	9	7	7	7
Nea Salamina	14	11	14	11	8	10	12	9	9	8	8	7	8	9	7	7	7	6	7	8	9	9	7	8	8	8
Ethnikos	12	14	13	14	14	12	10	11	10	10	9	10	10	8	9	10	10	9	8	7	7	8	8	9	9	9
Karmiotissa	7	8	10	10	12	9	7	7	7	9	10	9	7	7	8	8	9	10	10	10	10	10	10	10	10	10
Aris	6	7	9	9	11	11	13	13	13	13	12	11	11	11	11	11	11	12	11	11	11	11	11	11	11	11
Doxa	13	12	12	13	10	13	11	12	12	12	12	13	12	12	12	12	12	11	12	12	12	12	12	12	12	12
Anagennisi	10	10	11	12	13	14	14	14	14	14	14	14	14	14	14	14	14	14	14	14	14	14	14	14	14	13
AEZ	2	6	7	8	9	8	9	10	11	11	11	12	13	13	13	13	13	13	13	13	13	13	13	13	13	14

== Championship round ==
=== Table ===
Pos	Team	Pld	W	D	L	GF	GA	GD	Pts	Qualification
1	APOEL (C)	36	24	8	4	77	24	+53	80	Qualification for the Champions League second qualifying round
2	AEK Larnaca	36	22	10	4	66	28	+38	76	Qualification for the Europa League first qualifying round
3	Apollon Limassol	36	21	10	5	71	30	+41	73	Qualification for the Europa League second qualifying round (Note: Apollon Limassol qualified for the Europa League second qualifying round by winning the 2016–17 Cypriot Cup.)
4	AEL Limassol	36	19	9	8	53	36	+17	66	Qualification for the Europa League first qualifying round
5	Omonia	36	17	6	13	68	57	+11	57	
6	Anorthosis Famagusta	36	12	11	13	48	41	+7	47	

Source: CFA (in Greek), UEFA, Soccerway
Rules for classification: 1) Points; 2) Head-to-head points; 3) Head-to-head goal difference; 4) Head-to-head goals scored; 5) Head-to-head away goals scored (only if two teams); 6) Goal difference; 7) Goals scored; 8) Play-off (only if deciding champion or UEFA competitions).
(C) Champions

=== Results ===
Home \ Away	AEK	AEL	ANO	APOE	APOL	OMO
AEK Larnaca	—	1–1	1–0	2–1	1–0	1–1
AEL Limassol	2–1	—	2–0	1–4	1–1	3–2
Anorthosis Famagusta	0–1	0–1	—	0–1	3–1	4–3
APOEL	0–0	2–0	1–1	—	2–2	1–0
Apollon Limassol	3–2	1–1	1–1	1–0	—	3–0
Omonia Nicosia	1–2	2–1	2–0	1–3	0–2	—

Source: Cyprus Football Association
Legend: Blue = home team win; Yellow = draw; Red = away team win.
For upcoming matches, an "a" indicates there is an article about the rivalry between the two participants.

=== Positions by round ===
The table lists the positions of teams after each week of matches.

Qualification to Champions League second qualifying round
Qualification to Europa League first qualifying round

Team ╲ Round	27	28	29	30	31	32	33	34	35	36
APOEL	1	1	1	1	1	1	1	1	1	1
AEK	2	3	3	3	3	3	2	2	2	2
Apollon	3	2	2	2	2	2	3	3	3	3
AEL	4	5	4	4	4	4	4	4	4	4
Omonia	5	4	5	5	5	5	5	5	5	5
Anorthosis	6	6	6	6	6	6	6	6	6	6

== Relegation round ==
=== Table ===
Pos	Team	Pld	W	D	L	GF	GA	GD	Pts	Relegation
7	Nea Salamis Famagusta	36	12	9	15	33	44	−11	45	
8	Ethnikos Achna	36	11	10	15	57	66	−9	43	
9	Ermis Aradippou (Note: Ermis Aradippou were deducted six points for suspicious betting activity.)	36	14	6	16	51	61	−10	42	
10	Aris Limassol	36	11	8	17	47	65	−18	41	
11	Doxa Katokopias	36	10	7	19	40	52	−12	37 (Note: Head to head record: Doxa: 6 points (GD: +2), Karmiotissa: 6 points (GD: –2))	
12	Karmiotissa Pano Polemidion (R)	36	10	7	19	47	71	−24	37	Relegation to the Cypriot Second Division

Source: CFA, UEFA, Soccerway
Rules for classification: 1) Points; 2) Head-to-head points; 3) Head-to-head goal difference; 4) Head-to-head goals scored; 5) Head-to-head away goals scored (only if two teams); 6) Goal difference; 7) Goals scored; 8) Play-off (only if deciding champion or UEFA competitions).
(R) Relegated

=== Results ===
Home \ Away	ARI	DOX	ERM	ETH	KAR	NSL
Aris Limassol	—	4–1	2–0	0–1	3–2	1–1
Doxa Katokopias	0–1	—	2–1	3–3	3–0	0–3
Ermis Aradippou	2–1	1–5	—	3–4	3–1	3–0
Ethnikos Achna	1–1	0–4	1–1	—	1–1	0–2
Karmiotissa	5–1	1–2	0–1	5–3	—	2–0
Nea Salamis Famagusta	0–3	0–0	4–1	0–1	1–0	—

Source: Cyprus Football Association
Legend: Blue = home team win; Yellow = draw; Red = away team win.
For upcoming matches, an "a" indicates there is an article about the rivalry between the two participants.

=== Positions by round ===
The table lists the positions of teams after each week of matches.

Relegation to 2017–18 Cypriot Second Division

Team ╲ Round	27	28	29	30	31	32	33	34	35	36
Nea Salamina	8	8	8	8	8	8	8	9	7	7
Ethnikos	9	9	9	9	9	9	9	8	10	8
Ermis	7	7	7	7	7	7	7	7	8	9
Aris	11	10	10	11	10	10	10	10	9	10
Doxa	12	12	12	12	12	12	12	11	11	11
Karmiotissa	10	11	11	10	11	11	11	12	12	12

== Season statistics ==
=== Top scorers ===
Including matches played on 21 May 2017; Source: Cyprus Football Association

Rank	Player	Club	Goals
1	(England) Matt Derbyshire	Omonia	24
2	(Cyprus) Pieros Sotiriou	APOEL	21
3	(Georgia (country)) Nika Kacharava	Ethnikos	16
4	(Argentina) Emilio Zelaya	Ethnikos	15
5	(North Macedonia) Ivan Tričkovski	AEK	14
5	(Greece) Fotios Papoulis	Apollon	14
7	(Brazil) Rogério Martins	Aris	13
7	(Zimbabwe) Edward Mashinya	Ermis	13
9	(Brazil) André Alves	Anorthosis / AEK	12
9	(Brazil) Alex da Silva	Apollon	12
11	(Spain) Mikel Arruabarrena	AEL	11
11	(Netherlands) Nassir Maachi	Nea Salamina	11

=== Top assists ===
Updated to games played 21 May 2017; Source: kerkida.net

Rank	Player	Club	Assists
1	(Brazil) Alex da Silva	Apollon	11
2	(Portugal) João Pedro	Apollon	10
2	(Brazil) Eduardo Pincelli	Ethnikos	10
2	(Cyprus) Demetris Christofi	Omonia	10
5	(Cyprus) Efstathios Aloneftis	APOEL	9
5	(Portugal) Tiago Gomes	Doxa	9
7	(Spain) Tete	AEK	8
7	(Brazil) Vander Vieira	APOEL	8
7	(Cyprus) Renato Margaça	Omonia	8
10	(Spain) Ferran Corominas	Doxa	7
10	(Brazil) Cleyton	Omonia	7

=== Hat-tricks ===
#	Player	For	Against	Result	Date
1.	(Greece) Konstantinos Pangalos	AEZ	Ethnikos	3–1	21 August 2016
2.	(Netherlands) Nassir Maachi^{4}	Nea Salamina	AEZ	1–5	24 September 2016
3.	(Georgia (country)) Nika Kacharava^{4}	Ethnikos	Karmiotissa	4–2	29 October 2016
4.	(England) Matt Derbyshire	Omonia	Ethnikos	3–2	4 January 2017
5.	(Cyprus) Pieros Sotiriou	APOEL	Aris	5–0	8 January 2017
6.	(Zimbabwe) Edward Mashinya	Ermis	AEZ	0–4	18 February 2017
7.	(Brazil) André Alves	Anorthosis	Ethnikos	4–2	19 February 2017
8.	(Brazil) Rogério Martins	Aris	Ethnikos	3–1	4 March 2017
9.	(Argentina) Alejandro Barbaro	Karmiotissa	Aris	5–1	21 May 2017
10.	(Netherlands) Nassir Maachi	Nea Salamina	Doxa	0–3	21 May 2017

- ^{4} Player scored 4 goals.

=== Scoring ===
- First goal of the season: 1 minutes and 6 seconds – (England) Matt Derbyshire (Omonia) against Ermis (18:02 EET, 20 August 2016)
- Fastest goal of the season: 0 minutes and 48 seconds – (North Macedonia) Ivan Tričkovski (AEK) against Ermis (26 February 2017)
- Latest goal of the season: 96 minutes and 58 seconds – (Greece) Fotios Papoulis (Apollon) against AEL (7 January 2017)
- First scored penalty kick of the season: 1 minutes and 6 seconds – (England) Matt Derbyshire (Omonia) against Ermis (18:02 EET, 20 August 2016)
- First own goal of the season: 51 minutes and 44 seconds – (Spain) Albert Serrán (Doxa) for AEK (20:07 EET, 14 September 2016)
- Most goals scored in a match by one player: 4 goals
  - (Netherlands) Nassir Maachi (Nea Salamina) against AEZ (24 September 2016)
  - (Georgia (country)) Nika Kacharava (Ethnikos) against Karmiotissa (29 October 2016)
- Most scored goals in a single fixture – 30 goals (Fixture 24)
  - Fixture 24 results: Aris 4–0 Anagennisi, Nea Salamina 1–3 Doxa, AEZ 0–4 Ermis, AEK 4–2 Omonia, Apollon 3–0 Karmiotissa, Anorthosis 4–2 Ethnikos, APOEL 3–0 AEL.
- Highest scoring game: 8 goals
  - Ethnikos 5–3 Anagennisi (1 October 2016)
  - Karmiotissa 5–3 Ethnikos (12 March 2017)
- Largest winning margin: 7 goals
  - APOEL 7–0 AEZ (22 January 2017)
- Most goals scored in a match by a single team: 7 goals
  - APOEL 7–0 AEZ (22 January 2017)
- Most goals scored by a losing team: 3 goals
  - Ethnikos 5–3 Anagennisi (1 October 2016)
  - Karmiotissa 5–3 Ethnikos (12 March 2017)
  - Anorthosis 4–3 Omonia (29 April 2017)
  - Ermis 3–4 Ethnikos (21 May 2017)

=== Discipline ===
- First yellow card of the season: 42 minutes – (Brazil) Bruno Nascimento for Omonia against Ermis (18:42 EET, 20 August 2016)
- First red card of the season: 88 minutes – (Cyprus) Dimitris Froxylias for Nea Salamina against Apollon (21:43 EET, 20 August 2016)
- Most yellow cards in a single match: 11
  - APOEL 1–1 Anorthosis – 4 for APOEL (Vander Vieira, Kostakis Artymatas, Zhivko Milanov, Roger Cañas) and 7 for Anorthosis (Shehu Abdullahi, Airam López, Rubén Rayos, Nikola Mitrović, Carlitos, Gabriel de Moura, Dimitris Giannoulis) (23 April 2017)
  - Apollon 1–1 Anorthosis – 5 for Apollon (Valentin Roberge, Fotios Papoulis, Mário Sérgio, Anton Maglica, João Pedro) and 6 for Anorthosis (Shehu Abdullahi (2), João Victor, Filipe Oliveira, Iñigo Calderón, Dimitris Giannoulis) (14 May 2017)
- Most red cards in a single match: 2
  - Apollon 3–2 AEK – 1 for Apollon (Valentin Roberge) and 1 for AEK (Ivan Tričkovski) (18 March 2017)
  - AEK 1–0 Anorthosis – 2 for Anorthosis (João Victor, Guilherme Santos) (12 April 2017)
  - AEK 1–1 AEL – 1 for AEK (Jorge Larena) and 1 for AEL (Núrio Fortuna) (13 May 2017)

== Attendances ==
#	Club	Average
1	APOEL	7,126
2	Omonoia	5,542
3	Anorthosis	3,833
4	AEK Larnaca	3,365
5	AEL	2,886
6	Apollon Limassol	2,815
7	Nea Salamina	1,225
8	Aris Limassol	621
9	Ermis	586
10	AEZ	582
11	Ethnikos Achnas	581
12	Anagennisi	558
13	Karmiotissa	464
14	Doxa Katokopias	363
