= 2013–14 Cypriot First Division =

Glafcos Clerides Championship
- Season: 2013–14
- Champions: APOEL; 23rd title
- Relegated: Aris; AEK Kouklia; Enosis; Alki
- Champions League: APOEL; AEL
- Europa League: Apollon; Ermis; Omonia
- Matches: 242
- Goals: 703 (2.9 per match)
- Top goalscorer: Gastón Sangoy (18 goals); Marco Tagbajumi (18 goals); Jorge Monteiro (18 goals)
- Biggest home win: APOEL 8–1 Anorthosis (11 May 2014)
- Biggest away win: Doxa 0–6 Omonia (26 October 2013)
- Highest scoring: Aris 7–2 AEK Kouklia (4 May 2014); APOEL 8–1 Anorthosis (11 May 2014)
- Longest winning run: 9 matches APOEL
- Longest unbeaten run: 23 matches APOEL
- Longest winless run: 26 matches Alki
- Longest losing run: 12 matches Alki
- Highest attendance: 15,985; APOEL 3–0 AEL (22 April 2014)
- Lowest attendance: 2 AEK Kouklia 1–4 Ethnikos (23 April 2014); 2 AEK Kouklia 0–0 AEK Larnaca (11 May 2014)

The 2013–14 Cypriot First Division was the 75th season of the Cypriot top-level football league. It began on 31 August 2013 and ended on 31 May 2014. APOEL were the defending champions.

The league comprised eleven teams from the 2012–13 season and three promoted teams from the 2012–13 Second Division.

The 17 May 2014 title deciding match between AEL Limassol and APOEL was abandoned (at 0–0) after 52 minutes, when a bomb thrown by AEL fans, hit and injured APOEL's player Kaká. The match was replayed behind closed doors at a neutral stadium on 31 May 2014 and APOEL achieved to win their second consecutive league title after beating AEL Limassol by 1–0. However, on 6 June 2014, the Cyprus Football Association’s (CFA) disciplinary committee – acting as an appeals board – unanimously cancelled on the CFA council’s decision to repeat the 17 May championship final, awarding the match to APOEL with a 0–3 score.

== Teams ==
=== Promotion and relegation (pre-season) ===
AEP Paphos and Ayia Napa were relegated at the end of the first stage of the 2012–13 season after finishing in the bottom two places of the table. They were joined by Olympiakos Nicosia, who finished at the bottom of the second-phase Group C.

The relegated teams were replaced by 2012–13 Second Division champions Aris Limassol, runners-up AEK Kouklia and third-placed team Ermis Aradippou.

=== Stadia and locations ===
Location of clubs in 2013–14 Cypriot First Division

Note: Table lists clubs in alphabetical order.

| Club | Location | Venue | Capacity |
|---|---|---|---|
| AEK Kouklia | Kouklia, Paphos | Pafiako Stadium | 9,394 |
| AEK Larnaca | Larnaca | GSZ Stadium | 13,032 |
| AEL | Limassol | Tsirion Stadium | 13,331 |
| Alki | Larnaca | GSZ Stadium | 13,032 |
| Anorthosis | Larnaca | Antonis Papadopoulos Stadium | 10,230 |
| APOEL | Nicosia | GSP Stadium | 22,859 |
| Apollon | Limassol | Tsirion Stadium | 13,331 |
| Aris | Limassol | Tsirion Stadium | 13,331 |
| Doxa | Peristerona | Makario Stadium | 16,000 |
| Enosis | Paralimni | Tasos Markou Stadium | 5,800 |
| Ermis | Aradippou | Ammochostos Stadium | 5,500 |
| Ethnikos | Achna, Famagusta | Dasaki Stadium | 7,000 |
| Nea Salamina | Larnaca | Ammochostos Stadium | 5,500 |
| Omonia | Nicosia | GSP Stadium | 22,859 |

=== Personnel and kits ===
Note: Flags indicate national team as has been defined under FIFA eligibility rules. Players and Managers may hold more than one non-FIFA nationality.

| Team | Head coach | Captain | Kit manufacturer | Shirt sponsor |
|---|---|---|---|---|
| AEK Kouklia | (Cyprus) Stavros Fitides | (Cyprus) Alexandros Garpozis | Kappa | Christakis Petrakidis & Sons |
| AEK Larnaca | (Cyprus) Floros Nicolaou | (Greece) Giannis Skopelitis | Umbro | Cytavision |
| AEL | (Bulgaria) Ivaylo Petev | (Cyprus) Marios Nicolaou | Nike | Cytavision |
| Alki | (Serbia) Vesko Mihajlović | (Cyprus) Demetris Stylianou | GEMS | — |
| Anorthosis | (Greece) Nikos Kostenoglou | (Cyprus) Christos Marangos | Puma | Cytamobile-Vodafone |
| APOEL | (Greece) Georgios Donis | (Cyprus) Marinos Satsias | Puma | MTN |
| Apollon | (Cyprus) Christakis Christoforou | (Cyprus) Giorgos Merkis | Macron | Cyta |
| Aris | (Netherlands) Ton Caanen | (Bosnia and Herzegovina) Dušan Kerkez | Kappa | Cytanet |
| Doxa | (Cyprus) Demetris Ioannou | (Portugal) Abel Pereira | Kappa | Cytanet |
| Enosis | (Cyprus) Nikos Andronikou | (Cyprus) Giorgos Kolanis | Umbro | Cyta |
| Ermis | (Cyprus) Nicos Panayiotou | (Cyprus) Andreas Papathanasiou | Legea | Cyta |
| Ethnikos | (Cyprus) Apostolos Makrides | (Cyprus) Christos Poyiatzis | Uhlsport | Cyta |
| Nea Salamina | (Cyprus) Neophytos Larkou | (Cyprus) Giorgos Panagi | Tempo Sport | Cytamobile-Vodafone |
| Omonia | (Cyprus) Kostas Kaiafas | (Cyprus) Georgios Efrem | Nike | Cytamobile-Vodafone |

=== Managerial changes ===
| Team | Outgoing manager | Manner of departure | Date of vacancy | Position in table | Incoming manager | Date of appointment |
|---|---|---|---|---|---|---|
| Anorthosis | (Cyprus) Christos Kassianos | Resigned | 13 August 2013 | Pre-season | (Portugal) Jorge Costa | 17 August 2013 |
| Nea Salamina | (Greece) Apostolos Charalambidis | Resigned | 7 September 2013 | 12th | (Greece) Dimitris Kalaitzidis | 11 September 2013 |
| APOEL | (Portugal) Paulo Sérgio | Sacked | 4 October 2013 | 5th | (Greece) Georgios Donis | 11 October 2013 |
| Enosis | (Serbia) Saša Jovanović | Mutual consent | 6 October 2013 | 13th | (Cyprus) Marios Karas | 13 October 2013 |
| AEL | (Angola) Lito Vidigal | Mutual consent | 22 October 2013 | 4th | (Bulgaria) Ivaylo Petev | 25 October 2013 |
| Aris | (Cyprus) Tasos Kyriakou | Mutual consent | 25 October 2013 | 11th | (Netherlands) Ton Caanen | 26 October 2013 |
| Enosis | (Cyprus) Marios Karas | Mutual consent | 25 November 2013 | 13th | (Cyprus) Nikos Andronikou | 28 November 2013 |
| AEK Larnaca | (Greece) Dimitrios Eleftheropoulos | Mutual consent | 16 December 2013 | 9th | (Cyprus) Floros Nicolaou | 17 December 2013 |
| Omonia | (North Macedonia) Toni Savevski | Sacked | 18 December 2013 | 6th | (Spain) Miguel Ángel Lotina | 1 January 2014 |
| Ethnikos | (Greece) Nikos Kolompourdas | Sacked | 2 January 2014 | 10th | (Cyprus) Stavros Papadopoulos | 2 January 2014 |
| Ethnikos | (Cyprus) Stavros Papadopoulos | Sacked | 7 January 2014 | 11th | (Cyprus) Apostolos Makrides | 7 January 2014 |
| Nea Salamina | (Greece) Dimitris Kalaitzidis | Mutual consent | 15 January 2014 | 9th | (Cyprus) Neophytos Larkou | 16 January 2014 |
| Doxa | (Cyprus) Loukas Hadjiloukas | Resigned | 19 January 2014 | 8th | (Cyprus) Sofoklis Sofokleous | 21 January 2014 |
| Anorthosis | (Portugal) Jorge Costa | Mutual consent | 30 January 2014 | 5th | (Greece) Nikos Kostenoglou | 6 February 2014 |
| Omonia | (Spain) Miguel Ángel Lotina | Sacked | 6 February 2014 | 6th | (Cyprus) Kostas Kaiafas | 12 March 2014 |
| Alki | (Cyprus) Kostas Kaiafas | Signed by Omonia | 12 March 2014 | 14th | (Serbia) Vesko Mihajlović | 13 March 2014 |
| Doxa | (Cyprus) Sofoklis Sofokleous | Mutual consent | 9 April 2014 | 9th | (Cyprus) Demetris Ioannou | 9 April 2014 |
| AEK Kouklia | (Cyprus) Demetris Ioannou | Signed by Doxa | 9 April 2014 | 12th | (Cyprus) Stavros Fitides | 9 April 2014 |

== First phase ==
=== League table ===
| Pos | Team | Pld | W | D | L | GF | GA | GD | Pts | Qualification or relegation |
|---|---|---|---|---|---|---|---|---|---|---|
| 1 | AEL Limassol | 26 | 19 | 5 | 2 | 48 | 16 | +32 | 62 | Qualification for the championship group |
| 2 | Apollon Limassol | 26 | 19 | 2 | 5 | 47 | 19 | +28 | 59 (Note: APOL 2–0 APOE; APOE 2–1 APOL) | Qualification for the championship group |
| 3 | APOEL | 26 | 18 | 5 | 3 | 56 | 18 | +38 | 59 | Qualification for the championship group |
| 4 | Ermis Aradippou | 26 | 15 | 7 | 4 | 44 | 28 | +16 | 52 | Qualification for the championship group |
| 5 | Omonia Nicosia | 26 | 13 | 8 | 5 | 45 | 22 | +23 | 47 | Qualification for the championship group |
| 6 | Anorthosis Famagusta | 26 | 11 | 5 | 10 | 46 | 36 | +10 | 38 | Qualification for the championship group |
| 7 | AEK Larnaca | 26 | 10 | 7 | 9 | 37 | 28 | +9 | 37 | Qualification for the relegation group |
| 8 | Nea Salamis Famagusta (Note: On 17 May 2013, Nea Salamina were deducted three points by CFA because they failed to meet the financial criteria of UEFA.) | 26 | 12 | 2 | 12 | 26 | 31 | −5 | 35 | Qualification for the relegation group |
| 9 | Doxa Katokopias | 26 | 7 | 7 | 12 | 33 | 45 | −12 | 28 | Qualification for the relegation group |
| 10 | Ethnikos Achna | 26 | 6 | 5 | 15 | 27 | 38 | −11 | 23 | Qualification for the relegation group |
| 11 | AEK Kouklia | 26 | 6 | 3 | 17 | 27 | 64 | −37 | 21 | Qualification for the relegation group |
| 12 | Aris Limassol | 26 | 3 | 11 | 12 | 29 | 40 | −11 | 20 | Qualification for the relegation group |
| 13 | Enosis Neon Paralimni (Note: On 17 May 2013, Enosis Neon Paralimni were deducted three points by CFA because they failed to meet the financial criteria of UEFA.) (R) | 26 | 5 | 7 | 14 | 29 | 45 | −16 | 19 | Relegation to Cypriot Second Division |
| 14 | Alki Larnaca (Note: On 17 May 2013, Alki Larnaca were deducted three points by CFA because they failed to meet the financial criteria of UEFA. On 6 August 2013, Alki Larnaca were deducted another three points by CFA because they failed again to meet the financial criteria of UEFA. On 8 November 2013, Alki Larnaca were deducted six points by CFA because they failed for the third time to meet the financial criteria of UEFA. On 2 December 2013, Alki Larnaca were deducted two points by CFA because they failed to meet CFA's monthly financial criteria. On 8 January 2014, Alki Larnaca were deducted nine points by CFA because they failed to pay the referees' salaries in three of their home matches (deducted three points for each match). On 15 January 2014, Alki Larnaca were deducted three points by CFA because they failed again to pay the referees' salaries in two of their home matches. On 31 January 2014, Alki Larnaca were deducted two points by CFA because they failed for the fourth time to meet the financial criteria of UEFA. On 5 February 2014, Alki Larnaca were deducted nine points by CFA because they failed again to pay the referees' salaries in three of their home matches (deducted three points for each match). On 6 March 2014, Alki Larnaca were deducted two points by CFA because they failed for the fifth time to meet the financial criteria of UEFA. On 9 April 2014, Alki Larnaca were deducted two points by CFA because they failed for the sixth time to meet the financial criteria of UEFA.) (R) | 26 | 0 | 2 | 24 | 14 | 78 | −64 | −39 | Relegation to Cypriot Second Division |

Source: CFA, UEFA
Rules for classification: 1) points; 2) head-to-head points; 3) head-to-head goal difference; 4) head-to-head away goals scored; 5) goal difference; 6) number of goals scored
(R) Relegated

=== Results ===
| Home \ Away | AEKK | AEK | AEL | ALK | ANO | APOE | APOL | ARI | DOX | ENP | ERM | ETH | NSL | OMO |
|---|---|---|---|---|---|---|---|---|---|---|---|---|---|---|
| AEK Kouklia | | 2–1 | 0–4 | 2–1 | 1–5 | 1–6 | 1–3 | 2–0 | 0–0 | 2–2 | 0–1 | 0–2 | 2–0 | 0–4 |
| AEK Larnaca | 3–1 | | 1–2 | 6–0 | 2–1 | 1–1 | 0–2 | 2–2 | 1–2 | 2–0 | 0–0 | 2–1 | 0–1 | 0–0 |
| AEL Limassol | 1–0 | 1–1 | | 3–0 | 3–1 | 2–1 | 0–1 | 2–1 | 1–0 | 4–1 | 1–0 | 3–1 | 2–0 | 3–1 |
| Alki Larnaca | 0–3 | 2–5 | 0–3 | | 0–4 | 1–3 | 1–2 | 0–1 | 0–4 | 1–1 | 1–2 | 1–6 | 0–2 | 0–1 |
| Anorthosis Famagusta | 2–2 | 1–1 | 0–2 | 3–1 | | 1–2 | 3–1 | 1–0 | 1–2 | 3–2 | 0–1 | 2–1 | 1–1 | 3–1 |
| APOEL | 5–0 | 1–1 | 2–2 | 3–0 | 1–0 | | 2–1 | 1–0 | 5–1 | 3–0 | 3–0 | 2–0 | 3–1 | 2–0 |
| Apollon Limassol | 4–0 | 3–0 | 0–1 | 2–1 | 1–1 | 2–0 | | 3–2 | 2–1 | 3–0 | 1–0 | 0–1 | 1–2 | 1–0 |
| Aris Limassol | 4–0 | 0–3 | 1–1 | 0–0 | 2–0 | 1–3 | 0–1 | | 2–2 | 1–1 | 3–3 | 1–1 | 0–1 | 1–1 |
| Doxa Katokopias | 3–1 | 0–1 | 0–1 | 5–1 | 1–6 | 1–1 | 0–2 | 1–1 | | 1–1 | 2–4 | 1–1 | 2–0 | 0–6 |
| Enosis Neon Paralimni | 2–1 | 0–1 | 1–3 | 5–0 | 4–0 | 0–3 | 0–1 | 4–1 | 1–0 | | 0–2 | 0–0 | 0–1 | 0–3 |
| Ermis Aradippou | 5–2 | 2–1 | 1–1 | 3–1 | 0–0 | 2–0 | 0–0 | 2–1 | 5–1 | 3–2 | | 1–0 | 1–0 | 1–1 |
| Ethnikos Achna | 1–2 | 0–2 | 0–2 | 2–1 | 1–2 | 0–2 | 1–3 | 2–2 | 0–3 | 1–1 | 1–2 | | 2–0 | 1–2 |
| Nea Salamis Famagusta | 3–1 | 2–0 | 2–0 | 2–1 | 0–3 | 0–1 | 0–3 | 2–1 | 1–0 | 1–1 | 4–1 | 0–1 | | 0–1 |
| Omonia Nicosia | 2–1 | 1–0 | 0–0 | 5–0 | 3–2 | 0–0 | 2–4 | 1–1 | 0–0 | 4–0 | 2–2 | 1–0 | 3–0 | |

Source: CFA
Legend: Blue = home team win; Yellow = draw; Red = away team win.

== Second phase ==
=== Championship group ===
==== Table ====
| Pos | Team | Pld | W | D | L | GF | GA | GD | Pts | Qualification |
|---|---|---|---|---|---|---|---|---|---|---|
| 1 | APOEL (C) | 36 | 25 | 6 | 5 | 80 | 25 | +55 | 81 (Note: APOEL: 7 pts; AEL: 4 pts) | Qualification for the Champions League third qualifying round |
| 2 | AEL Limassol | 36 | 25 | 6 | 5 | 68 | 29 | +39 | 81 | Qualification for the Champions League third qualifying round |
| 3 | Apollon Limassol | 36 | 24 | 5 | 7 | 66 | 29 | +37 | 77 | Qualification for the Europa League play-off round (Note: Since cup winners APOEL qualified for the 2014-15 UEFA Champions League and the runners-up Ermis finished top-four, all of the Europa League spots revert into league positions.) |
| 4 | Ermis Aradippou | 36 | 18 | 8 | 10 | 55 | 54 | +1 | 62 | Qualification for the Europa League third qualifying round |
| 5 | Omonia Nicosia | 36 | 16 | 11 | 9 | 59 | 37 | +22 | 59 | Qualification for the Europa League second qualifying round |
| 6 | Anorthosis Famagusta | 36 | 12 | 6 | 18 | 57 | 64 | −7 | 42 | |

Source: CFA, UEFA
Rules for classification: 1) points; 2) head-to-head points; 3) head-to-head goal difference; 4) head-to-head goals scored; 5) goal difference; 6) number of goals scored.
(C) Champions

==== Results ====
| Home \ Away | AEL | ANO | APOE | APOL | ERM | OMO |
|---|---|---|---|---|---|---|
| AEL Limassol | | 4–3 | 0–3 (Note: CFA awarded APOEL a 3–0 win as a result of the injury of APOEL's player Kaká who was hit by firecrackers thrown by AEL fans. The match originally abandoned (at 0–0) after 52 minutes and replayed 15 days later, ending 1–0 to APOEL. The CFA's decision to award APOEL a 3–0 win, was taken six days after APOEL's 1–0 win in the rematch.) | 0–1 | 4–0 | 2–0 |
| Anorthosis Famagusta | 0–3 | | 0–1 | 2–2 | 1–2 | 1–2 |
| APOEL | 3–0 | 8–1 | | 3–0 | 1–2 | 2–1 |
| Apollon Limassol | 1–1 | 3–0 | 2–1 | | 5–1 | 0–0 |
| Ermis Aradippou | 0–3 (Note: CFA awarded AEL a 3–0 win as a result of Ermis fielding the ineligible player Constantinos Samaras. The match originally ended 2–0 to AEL.) | 0–2 | 1–2 | 0–4 | | 2–1 |
| Omonia Nicosia | 2–3 | 3–1 | 0–0 | 2–1 | 3–3 | |

Source: CFA
Legend: Blue = home team win; Yellow = draw; Red = away team win.

=== Relegation group ===
==== Table ====
| Pos | Team | Pld | W | D | L | GF | GA | GD | Pts | Relegation |
|---|---|---|---|---|---|---|---|---|---|---|
| 7 | Nea Salamis Famagusta (Note: On 17 May 2013, Nea Salamina were deducted three points by CFA because they failed to meet the financial criteria of UEFA.) | 36 | 17 | 3 | 16 | 43 | 49 | −6 | 51 | |
| 8 | AEK Larnaca | 36 | 13 | 11 | 12 | 49 | 36 | +13 | 50 | |
| 9 | Ethnikos Achna | 36 | 12 | 8 | 16 | 48 | 45 | +3 | 44 | |
| 10 | Doxa Katokopias | 36 | 11 | 9 | 16 | 50 | 61 | −11 | 42 | |
| 11 | Aris Limassol (R) | 36 | 8 | 13 | 15 | 51 | 57 | −6 | 37 | Relegation to Cypriot Second Division |
| 12 | AEK Kouklia (R) | 36 | 6 | 5 | 25 | 34 | 94 | −60 | 23 | Relegation to Cypriot Second Division |

Source: CFA, UEFA
Rules for classification: 1) points; 2) head-to-head points; 3) head-to-head goal difference; 4) head-to-head goals scored; 5) goal difference; 6) number of goals scored.
(R) Relegated

==== Results ====
| Home \ Away | AEKK | AEK | ARI | DOX | ETH | NSL |
|---|---|---|---|---|---|---|
| AEK Kouklia | | 0–0 | 1–2 | 1–1 | 1–4 | 1–4 |
| AEK Larnaca | 1–0 | | 1–1 | 6–1 | 0–0 | 3–0 |
| Aris Limassol | 7–2 | 3–1 | | 3–1 | 1–1 | 1–2 |
| Doxa Katokopias | 4–0 | 0–0 | 2–0 | | 1–0 | 1–3 |
| Ethnikos Achna | 5–0 | 2–0 | 3–0 | 3–2 | | 1–1 |
| Nea Salamis Famagusta | 2–1 | 1–0 | 3–4 | 0–4 | 1–2 | |

Updated to match(es) played on 18 May 2014. Source: CFA
Legend: Blue = home team win; Yellow = draw; Red = away team win.

== Season statistics ==
=== Top scorers ===
Including matches played on 31 May 2014; Source: Cyprus Football Association

| Rank | Player | Club | Goals |
|---|---|---|---|
| 1 | (Argentina) Gastón Sangoy | Apollon | 18 |
| 1 | (Nigeria) Marco Tagbajumi | Ermis | 18 |
| 1 | (Portugal) Jorge Monteiro | AEL | 18 |
| 4 | (Malta) André Schembri | Omonia | 17 |
| 5 | (Brazil) Thuram | Aris | 15 |
| 5 | (Israel) Roberto Colautti | Anorthosis | 15 |
| 7 | (Brazil) Gustavo Manduca | APOEL | 13 |
| 7 | (Portugal) Orlando Sá | AEL | 13 |
| 9 | (Argentina) Tomás De Vincenti | APOEL | 12 |
| 9 | (Nigeria) Chidi Onyemah | Ethnikos | 12 |
| 9 | (Greece) Fotios Papoulis | Apollon | 12 |
| 9 | (Cyprus) Koullis Pavlou | AEK Larnaca | 12 |

=== Hat-tricks ===
| # | Player | For | Against | Result | Date |
|---|---|---|---|---|---|
| 1. | (Brazil) Marcos De Azevedo^{4} | Ermis | Doxa | 2–4 | 21 September 2013 |
| 2. | (Argentina) Gastón Sangoy | Apollon | Ethnikos | 1–3 | 28 October 2013 |
| 3. | (Nigeria) Chidi Onyemah | Ethnikos | Alki | 1–6 | 2 November 2013 |
| 4. | (Nigeria) Marco Tagbajumi | Ermis | Aris | 3–3 | 30 November 2013 |
| 5. | (Portugal) Esmaël Gonçalves | APOEL | AEK Kouklia | 5–0 | 2 December 2013 |
| 6. | (Spain) Gonzalo García^{4} | Anorthosis | Doxa | 1–6 | 18 January 2014 |
| 7. | (North Macedonia) Besart Ibraimi | Enosis | Anorthosis | 4–0 | 9 February 2014 |
| 8. | (Cyprus) Efstathios Aloneftis | APOEL | Doxa | 5–1 | 22 February 2013 |
| 9. | (Portugal) Jorge Monteiro | AEL | AEK Kouklia | 0–4 | 19 March 2014 |
| 10. | (Spain) Hugo López | Apollon | Ermis | 0–4 | 13 April 2014 |
| 11. | (Brazil) Thuram^{4} | Aris | Nea Salamina | 3–4 | 23 April 2014 |
| 12. | (Portugal) Diogo Ramos | Doxa | Nea Salamina | 0–4 | 4 May 2014 |
| 13. | (Argentina) Tomás De Vincenti | APOEL | Anorthosis | 8–1 | 11 May 2014 |
| 14. | (Greece) Nikos Barboudis | Ethnikos | AEK Kouklia | 5–0 | 18 May 2014 |

- ^{4} Player scored 4 goals.

=== Scoring ===
- First goal of the season: 13 minutes and 21 seconds – (Australia) Robert Stambolziev (AEK Kouklia) against AEK Larnaca (20:13 EET, 31 August 2013)
- Fastest goal of the season: 18 seconds – (Brazil) Césinha (Ermis) against Nea Salamina (24 November 2013)
- Latest goal of the season: 97 minutes and 4 seconds – (Israel) Roberto Colautti (Anorthosis) against Omonia (31 August 2013)
- First scored penalty kick of the season: 48 minutes and 2 seconds – (Argentina) Pablo Vranjicán (AEK Kouklia) against AEK Larnaca (21:03 EET, 31 August 2013)
- First own goal of the season: 56 minutes and 21 seconds – (Brazil) Diego Gaúcho (AEL) for APOEL (20:24 EET, 14 September 2013)
- Most goals scored in a match by one player: 4 goals
  - (Brazil) Thuram (Aris) against Nea Salamina (23 April 2014)
  - (Spain) Gonzalo García (Anorthosis) against Doxa (18 January 2014)
  - (Brazil) Marcos De Azevedo (Ermis) against Doxa (21 September 2013)
- Most scored goals in a single fixture – 28 goals (Fixture 16)
  - Fixture 16 results: AEK Larnaca 1–1 APOEL, Aris 4–0 AEK Kouklia, Omonia 2–4 Apollon, Ermis 5–1 Doxa, Anorthosis 3–1 Alki, AEL 4–1 Enosis, Nea Salamina 0–1 Ethnikos.
- Highest scoring game: 9 goals
  - APOEL 8–1 Anorthosis (11 May 2014)
  - Aris 7–2 AEK Kouklia (4 May 2014)
- Largest winning margin: 7 goals
  - APOEL 8–1 Anorthosis (11 May 2014)
- Most goals scored in a match by a single team: 8 goals
  - APOEL 8–1 Anorthosis (11 May 2014)
- Most goals scored by a losing team: 3 goals
  - AEL 4–3 Anorthosis (26 April 2014)
  - Nea Salamina 3–4 Aris (23 April 2014)

=== Discipline ===
- First yellow card of the season: 31 minutes – (Portugal) Nuno Assis for Omonia against Anorthosis (19:31 EET, 31 August 2013)
- First red card of the season: 68 minutes – (Lithuania) Ernestas Šetkus for Nea Salamina against Doxa (19:23 EET, 1 September 2013)
- Most yellow cards in a single match: 14
  - Doxa 2–0 Aris – 9 for Doxa (Miloš Pavlović, Abel Pereira, Pedro Baquero, Pedrito, Leandro, Carlos Marques, Rodri, Toni, Gleison) and 5 for Aris (Kypros Christoforou, Douglas Reis, Eduardo Pincelli, Emmanuel Okoye, Zoltán Kovács) (11 May 2014)
- Most red cards in a single match: 2
  - Anorthosis 1–1 Nea Salamina – 1 for Anorthosis (Grigoris Makos) and 1 for Nea Salamina (Justin Mengolo) (9 March 2014)
  - Omonia 3–2 Anorthosis – 1 for Omonia (Anthony Scaramozzino) and 1 for Anorthosis (Dan Alexa) (21 December 2013)
  - Aris 0–1 Apollon – 1 for Aris (Charalambos Pittakas) and 1 for Apollon (Giorgos Merkis) (16 December 2013)
  - Doxa 1–1 APOEL – 1 for Doxa (Richard Kingson) and 1 for APOEL (Aritz Borda) (23 November 2013)

== Attendances ==
| # | Club | Average |
|---|---|---|
| 1 | APOEL | 7,895 |
| 2 | Omonoia | 7,495 |
| 3 | Apollon Limassol | 4,901 |
| 4 | AEL | 4,600 |
| 5 | Anorthosis | 2,794 |
| 6 | Ermis | 1,322 |
| 7 | AEK Larnaca | 1,242 |
| 8 | Nea Salamina | 1,108 |
| 9 | Alki | 923 |
| 10 | Ethnikos Achnas | 746 |
| 11 | Paralimni | 739 |
| 12 | Aris Limassol | 581 |
| 13 | Kouklion | 545 |
| 14 | Doxa Katokopias | 418 |

== Sources ==
- "2013/14 Cypriot First Division". Rec.Sport.Soccer Statistics Foundation. 14 January 2016.
