= 1990 FIFA World Cup qualification – UEFA Group 5 =

Football tournament qualification stage

The 1990 FIFA World Cup qualification UEFA Group 5 was a UEFA qualifying group for the 1990 FIFA World Cup. The group comprised Cyprus, France, Norway, Scotland and Yugoslavia.

The group was won by Yugoslavia, who qualified for the 1990 FIFA World Cup. Scotland also qualified as runners-up.

== Standings ==
Pos	Team	Pld	W	D	L	GF	GA	GD	Pts	Qualification	Yugoslavia national football team	Scotland national football team	France national football team	Norway national football team	Cyprus national football team
1	Yugoslavia	8	6	2	0	16	6	+10	14	Qualification to 1990 FIFA World Cup	—	3–1	3–2	1–0	4–0
2	Scotland	8	4	2	2	12	12	0	10	Qualification to 1990 FIFA World Cup	1–1	—	2–0	1–1	2–1
3	France	8	3	3	2	10	7	+3	9		0–0	3–0	—	1–0	2–0
4	Norway	8	2	2	4	10	9	+1	6		1–2	1–2	1–1	—	3–1
5	Cyprus	8	0	1	7	6	20	−14	1		1–2	2–3	1–1	0–3	—

=== Results ===
14 September 1988

Norway	1 – 2	Scotland
Fjørtoft 44'	(Report)	McStay 14'; Johnston 62'

Ullevaal Stadion, Oslo
Attendance: 22,769
Referee: Luigi Agnolin (Italy)

28 September 1988

France	1 – 0	Norway
Papin 84' (pen.)	(Report)

Parc des Princes, Paris
Attendance: 22,000
Referee: Günther Habermann (East Germany)

19 October 1988

Scotland	1 – 1	Yugoslavia
Johnston 19'	(Report)	Katanec 37'

Hampden Park, Glasgow
Attendance: 42,771
Referee: Karl-Heinz Tritschler (West Germany)

22 October 1988

Cyprus	1 – 1	France
Pittas 78' (pen.)	(Report)	Xuereb 44'

Makario Stadium, Nicosia
Attendance: 2,700
Referee: Emilio Soriano Aladrén (Spain)

2 November 1988

Cyprus	0 – 3	Norway
	(Report)	Sørloth 57', 78'; Osvold 90'

Tsirion Stadium, Limassol
Attendance: 7,767
Referee: Edgar Azzopardi (Malta)

19 November 1988

Yugoslavia	3 – 2	France
Spasić 11'; Sušić 76'; Stojković 82'	(Report)	Perez 3'; Sauzée 68'

JNA Stadium, Belgrade
Attendance: 7,489
Referee: Erik Fredriksson (Sweden)

11 December 1988

Yugoslavia	4 – 0	Cyprus
Savićević 13', 33', 82'; Hadžibegić 44' (pen.)	(Report)

Stadion Crvena Zvezda, Belgrade
Attendance: 15,246
Referee: Todor Kolev (Bulgaria)

8 February 1989

Cyprus	2 – 3	Scotland
Kolliandris 13'; Ioannou 47'	(Report)	Johnston 9'; Gough 54', 90'

Tsirion Stadium, Limassol
Attendance: 25,000
Referee: Siegfried Kirschen (East Germany)

8 March 1989

Scotland	2 – 0	France
Johnston 28', 52'	(Report)

Hampden Park, Glasgow
Attendance: 65,204
Referee: Jiri Stiegler (Czechoslovakia)

26 April 1989

Scotland	2 – 1	Cyprus
Johnston 26'; McCoist 63'	(Report)	Nicolaou 62'

Hampden Park, Glasgow
Attendance: 50,081
Referee: Gudmundur Haraldsson (Iceland)

29 April 1989

France	0 – 0	Yugoslavia
	(Report)

Parc des Princes, Paris
Attendance: 34,287
Referee: Tulio Lanese (Italy)

21 May 1989

Norway	3 – 1	Cyprus
Osvold 16'; Sørloth 34'; Bratseth 35'	(Report)	Kolliandris 44'

Ullevaal Stadion, Oslo
Attendance: 10,271
Referee: Peter Mikkelsen (Denmark)

14 June 1989

Norway	1 – 2	Yugoslavia
Fjørtoft 89'	(Report)	Stojković 21'; Vujović 86'

Ullevaal Stadium, Oslo
Attendance: 22,740
Referee: Vadim Zhuk (Soviet Union)

5 September 1989

Norway	1 – 1	France
Bratseth 84'	(Report)	Papin 40' (pen.)

Ullevaal Stadion, Oslo
Attendance: 8,564
Referee: Todor Kolev (Bulgaria)

6 September 1989

Yugoslavia	3 – 1	Scotland
Katanec 52'; Nicol 58' (o.g.); Vujović 59'	(Report)	Durie 37'

Maksimir Stadium, Zagreb
Attendance: 42,500
Referee: Marcel van Langenhove (Belgium)

11 October 1989

Yugoslavia	1 – 0	Norway
Hadžibegić 44' (pen.)	(Report)

Olympic Stadium, Sarajevo
Attendance: 32,000
Referee: Yusuf Namoğlu (Turkey)
11 October 1989

France	3 – 0	Scotland
Deschamps 26'; Cantona 63'; Durand 89'	(Report)

Parc des Princes, Paris
Attendance: 25,000
Referee: Kurt Röthlisberger (Switzerland)

28 October 1989

Cyprus	1 – 2	Yugoslavia
Pittas 38' (pen.)	(Report)	Stanojković 5'; Pančev 49'

Olympic Stadium, Athens (Note: This match was played on neutral ground in Greece instead of in Cyprus because Cyprus was penalised for rioting during the Cyprus vs Scotland match.)
Attendance: 1,046
Referee: Ioan Igna (Romania)

15 November 1989

Scotland	1 – 1	Norway
McCoist 44'	(Report)	Johnsen 89'

Hampden Park, Glasgow
Attendance: 63,987
Referee: Michał Listkiewicz (Poland)

18 November 1989

France	2 – 0	Cyprus
Deschamps 25'; Blanc 75'	(Report)

Stadium Municipal, Toulouse
Attendance: 34,687
Referee: Valeri Butenko (Soviet Union)

== Goalscorers ==
There were 54 goals scored during the 20 games, an average of 2.7 goals per game.

6 goals

- (Scotland) Mo Johnston

3 goals

- (Norway) Gøran Sørloth
- (Socialist Federal Republic of Yugoslavia) Dejan Savićević

2 goals

- (Cyprus) Christos Kolliandris
- (Cyprus) Pambos Pittas
- (France) Didier Deschamps
- (France) Jean-Pierre Papin
- (Norway) Rune Bratseth
- (Norway) Jan Åge Fjørtoft
- (Norway) Kjetil Osvold
- (Scotland) Ally McCoist
- (Scotland) Richard Gough
- (Socialist Federal Republic of Yugoslavia) Faruk Hadžibegić
- (Socialist Federal Republic of Yugoslavia) Srečko Katanec
- (Socialist Federal Republic of Yugoslavia) Dragan Stojković
- (Socialist Federal Republic of Yugoslavia) Zlatko Vujović

1 goal

- (Cyprus) Yiannos Ioannou
- (Cyprus) Floros Nicolaou
- (France) Laurent Blanc
- (France) Eric Cantona
- (France) Jean-Philippe Durand
- (France) Christian Perez
- (France) Franck Sauzée
- (France) Daniel Xuereb
- (Norway) Erland Johnsen
- (Scotland) Gordon Durie
- (Scotland) Paul McStay
- (Socialist Federal Republic of Yugoslavia) Darko Pančev
- (Socialist Federal Republic of Yugoslavia) Predrag Spasić
- (Socialist Federal Republic of Yugoslavia) Vujadin Stanojković
- (Socialist Federal Republic of Yugoslavia) Safet Sušić

1 own goal

- (Scotland) Gary Gillespie (playing against Yugoslavia)
