= Toumbas =

Toumbas is a surname. Notable people with the surname include:

- Ioakeim Toumbas (born 1999), Cypriot footballer
- Ioannis Toumbas (1901–1995), Greek naval officer and politician
