= Toumpas =

Toumpas is a surname. Notable people with the surname include:

- Ioakeim Toumpas (born 1999), Cypriot footballer
- Jimmy Toumpas (born 1994), Australian rules footballer
