= Christoforou =

Christoforou may refer to:

== People with the surname ==
- Christakis Christoforou (born 1964), Cypriot football manager.
- Constantinos Christoforou, Cypriot singer.
- John Christoforou (1921–2014), British painter.
- Kypros Christoforou (born 1993), Cypriot football player.
- Lefteris Christoforou (born 1963), Cypriot politician.
