= Jorge Monteiro =

Portuguese footballer (born 1988)

Personal information
- Full name: Jorge Filipe Monteiro dos Santos Lourenço
- Date of birth: 15 August 1988 (age 38)
- Place of birth: Porto, Portugal
- Height: 1.71 m (5 ft 7 in)
- Position: Winger

Youth career
- 1996–2007: Porto

Senior career*
Years	Team	Apps	(Gls)
2006–2010	Porto B	2	(0)
2007–2008	→ Ribeirão (loan)	34	(6)
2008	→ Estrela Amadora (loan)	1	(0)
2009	→ Covilhã (loan)	9	(4)
2009	→ Portimonense (loan)	10	(2)
2010	→ Covilhã (loan)	15	(2)
2010–2011	Santa Clara	27	(4)
2011–2014	AEL Limassol	84	(24)
2014	Moreirense	2	(0)
2015–2016	AEK Larnaca	33	(7)
2016–2017	Iraklis	33	(1)
2017–2018	Anadia	6	(0)
2018	Ermis	16	(2)
2018	Beira-Mar	6	(0)
2019–2020	Othellos Athienou	7	(0)
2020–2021	Gondomar	20	(3)
2021–2022	Leça	22	(7)
2022–2023	Gondomar	12	(2)

International career
2006	Portugal U18	5	(0)
2006–2007	Portugal U19	12	(3)
2008	Portugal U20	10	(2)
2009	Portugal U21	3	(0)
- * Club domestic league appearances and goals as of 19:29, 8 June 2024 (UTC)

Jorge Filipe Monteiro dos Santos Lourenço (born 15 August 1988), known as Monteiro, is a Portuguese professional footballer who plays as a winger.

== Club career ==
=== Portugal ===
Born in Porto, Monteiro played youth football with local Porto, having joined its youth system at the age of 8. Until his release on 30 June 2010, he was consecutively loaned to Ribeirão, Estrela da Amadora, S.C. Covilhã (twice) and Portimonense.

Monteiro's Primeira Liga input during this timeframe consisted of 13 minutes with the second club, in a 1–0 away loss against Vitória de Setúbal on 31 August 2008.

=== Cyprus ===
In summer 2011, after one season in his country's Segunda Liga with Santa Clara, Monteiro signed with AEL Limassol from the Cypriot First Division. In his first year, he contributed two goals in 26 games to help his team win the national championship after a 44-year wait.

Monteiro scored a career-best 18 goals in the 2013–14 campaign, topping the goal charts as the side ranked second after eventual winners APOEL. During his three-year tenure, he netted 26 times from 105 appearances in all competitions, and also reached the final of the domestic cup twice.

=== Later years ===
Monteiro returned to his country and its top flight for 2014–15, joining Moreirense on a two-year contract. In January 2015, however, he moved back to Cyprus' with AEK Larnaca, going on to score ten official goals over a 12-month period.

== International career ==
All youth categories comprised, Monteiro won 30 caps for Portugal and scored five goals. His debut with the under-21s occurred on 11 July 2009, in a 0–1 defeat to Cape Verde for the Lusofonia Games.

== Career statistics ==
As of match played on 28 April 2018

Appearances and goals by club, season and competition
Club	Season	League			Cup		Other		Total	
Club	Season	Division	Apps	Goals	Apps	Goals	Apps	Goals	Apps	Goals
Ribeirão (loan)	2007–08	Segunda Divisão	34	6	0	0	—		34	6
Estrela Amadora (loan)	2008–09	Primeira Liga	1	0	1	0	—		2	0
Covilhã (loan)	2008–09	Segunda Liga	9	4	0	0	—		9	4
Portimonense (loan)	2009–10	Segunda Liga	10	2	3	0	—		13	2
Covilhã (loan)	2009–10	Segunda Liga	15	2	0	0	—		15	2
Santa Clara	2010–11	Segunda Liga	27	4	5	0	—		32	4
AEL Limassol	2011–12	Cypriot First Division	26	2	6	0	—		32	2
AEL Limassol	2012–13	Cypriot First Division	23	4	7	2	7	0	37	6
AEL Limassol	2013–14	Cypriot First Division	35	18	2	0	—		37	18
AEL Limassol	Total		84	24	15	2	7	0	106	26
Moreirense	2014–15	Primeira Liga	2	0	2	0	—		4	0
AEK Larnaca	2014–15	Cypriot First Division	17	5	5	1	—		22	6
AEK Larnaca	2015–16	Cypriot First Division	16	2	1	2	2	0	19	4
AEK Larnaca	Total		33	6	6	3	2	0	41	9
Iraklis	2015–16	Super League Greece	7	0	0	0	—		7	0
Iraklis	2016–17	Super League Greece	26	1	2	0	—		28	1
Iraklis	Total		33	1	2	0	—		35	1
Anadia	2017–18	Campeonato de Portugal	6	0	0	0	—		6	0
Ermis	2017–18	Cypriot First Division	16	2	2	1	—		18	3
Career total			270	51	36	6	9	0	315	57

== Honours ==
AEL Limassol

- Cypriot First Division: 2011–12
- Cypriot Cup runner-up: 2011–12, 2012–13

Individual

- Cypriot First Division top scorer: 2013–14 (joint)
