= Bojan Markoski =

Macedonian footballer

Personal information
- Date of birth: 8 August 1983 (age 43)
- Place of birth: Skopje, SFR Yugoslavia
- Height: 1.87 m (6 ft 2 in)
- Position: Centre-back

Team information
- Current team: AEL Limassol (assistant)

Youth career
- Vardar

Senior career*
Years	Team	Apps	(Gls)
2003–2004	Cementarnica 55		
2004–2006	Vardar	64	(3)
2007	Bežanija	15	(0)
2007–2008	OFK Beograd	32	(1)
2009	Vardar	11	(0)
2009–2012	Enosis Neon Paralimni	80	(1)
2012–2014	Apollon Limassol	17	(2)
2014–2015	Ayia Napa	38	(1)
2016	Rabotnički	7	(0)
2016–2017	Ayia Napa	23	(2)
2017–2018	Othellos	15	(0)
2018–2020	Ethnikos Achna	45	(3)

International career
2001–2002	Macedonia U19		
2003–2005	Macedonia U21	20	(1)
2005	Macedonia (unofficial)	1	(0)
2015	Macedonia	1	(0)

Managerial career
- 2020–2022: Ethnikos Achna (assistant)
- 2020: Ethnikos Achna (caretaker)
- 2022–: AEL Limassol (assistant)
- * Club domestic league appearances and goals

Bojan Markoski (Macedonian: Бојан Маркоски; born 8 August 1983) is a Macedonian former professional footballer who played as a centre-back. He is currently the assistant manager of AEL Limassol.

== Club career ==
Markoski played with Macedonian clubs FK Cementarnica 55, FK Vardar and Rabotnički, beside Serbian top league clubs FK Bežanija and OFK Beograd.

== International career ==
Markoski made his debut for the Macedonia national team on 11 November 2005, in a friendly match against Iran in Teheran, which was unofficial. His official debut for the main national team happened a decade later, on 27 March 2015, in a UEFA Euro 2016 qualifying Group C game against Belarus.
