= Christos Koliantris =

Cypriot footballer (born 1964)

Personal information
- Date of birth: 30 March 1964 (age 62)
- Position: Midfielder

Senior career*
Years	Team	Apps	(Gls)
1985–1991	AEL Limassol		

International career
1988–1991	Cyprus	10	(2)
- * Club domestic league appearances and goals

Christos Koliantris (born 30 March 1964) is a retired Cypriot football midfielder.
