= Ioakeim Toumpas =

Cypriot footballer (born 1999)

Personal information
- Full name: Ioakeim Toumpas
- Date of birth: 19 February 1999 (age 27)
- Place of birth: Larnaca, Cyprus
- Height: 1.97 m (6 ft 6 in)
- Position: Goalkeeper

Team information
- Current team: Ethnikos Achna FC
- Number: 38

Youth career
- –2016: AEK Larnaca FC

Senior career*
Years	Team	Apps	(Gls)
2016–2025	AEK Larnaca FC	17	(0)
2020–2021	→ Karmiotissa (loan)	10	(0)
2025 -	Ethnikos Achna FC	19	(0)
- * Club domestic league appearances and goals as of 14 June 2026

Ioakeim Toumpas (Greek: Ιωακείμ Τούμπας; born 19 February 1999) is a Cypriot professional footballer who plays as a goalkeeper for Ethnikos Achna FC.

== Club career ==
=== Early career ===
Born in Larnaca, Cyprus, Toumpas grew up in the AEK Larnaca Football Academy.On 18 September 2021 was given his Cypriot First Division debut by head coach David Català, in a 1–1 draw match against Pafos FC.

==== Loan to Karmiotissa ====
On 30 September 2020, Toumpas joined Karmiotissa on loan. He played ten league games in the 2020–21 season.

== Career statistics ==
As of 17 June 2023

Club	Season	League			National Cup		Europe		Other		Total	
Club	Season	Division	Apps	Goals	Apps	Goals	Apps	Goals	Apps	Goals	Apps	Goals
AEK Larnaca	2016–17	Cypriot First Division	—		—		—		—		—	
AEK Larnaca	2017–18	Cypriot First Division	—		—		—		—		—	
AEK Larnaca	2018–19	Cypriot First Division	—		—		—		—		—	
AEK Larnaca	2019–20	Cypriot First Division	—		—		—		—		—	
AEK Larnaca	2021–22	Cypriot First Division	16	0	5	0	—		—		21	0
AEK Larnaca	2022–23	Cypriot First Division	1	0	1	0	1	0	—		3	0
AEK Larnaca	Subtotal		17	0	6	0	1	0	—		24	0
Karmiotissa (loan)	2020–21	Cypriot First Division	10	0	1	0	—		—		11	0
Career total			27	0	7	0	1	0	0	0	36	0

== Honours ==
AEK Larnaca

- Cypriot Cup: 2024–25
