= Ioakim Ioakim =

Cypriot footballer (born 1975)

Personal information
- Full name: Ioakim Ioakim
- Date of birth: 16 September 1975 (age 51)
- Place of birth: Nicosia, Cyprus
- Height: 1.80 m (5 ft 11 in)
- Position: Defender

Senior career*
Years	Team	Apps	(Gls)
1994–2008	Omonia	222	(27)

International career
1998–2003	Cyprus	28	(3)

Managerial career
- 2017: Omonia (caretaker)
- * Club domestic league appearances and goals as of 24 May 2008

Ioakim Ioakim (born 16 September 1975) is a Cypriot former footballer. Ioakim was a rare one-club man, having spent his entire career at Omonia.

in 2008, he transferred very briefly to Olympiakos Nicosia in a player-coach role at the Olympiakos academy. However, he subsequently announced his retirement for family reasons. He has previously held assistant manager roles at Omonia and Alki Larnaca.
