= Akis Agiomamitis =

Cypriot footballer

Personal information
- Full name: Savvas Agiomamitis
- Place of birth: Cyprus
- Position: Defender

Senior career*
Years	Team	Apps	(Gls)
1979–1986	OFI	184	(4)
1987–1988	Apollon Limassol		

International career
1987	Cyprus	1	(0)

Managerial career
- 2006: Bloemfontein Celtic
- 2008–2009: Aris Limassol
- 2009–2010: Black Aces
- 2014–2015: Aris Limassol
- * Club domestic league appearances and goals

Akis Agiomamitis is a retired Cypriot international footballer who played as a defender for OFI and is now a football manager.

== Club career ==
Agiomamitis moved to Greece in July 1979, joining Greek first division side OFI. He would stay with OFI for seven seasons in the Greek first division.

== International career ==
Agiomamitis made one appearance for the Cyprus national football team during 1987.

== Managerial career ==
After he retired from playing, Agiomamitis become a manager. He led Aris Limassol F.C. in 2008 and 2009, before managing South African club Mpumalanga Black Aces F.C. in 2009 and 2010.
