= Limassol derby =

Local derby in Limassol, Cyprus

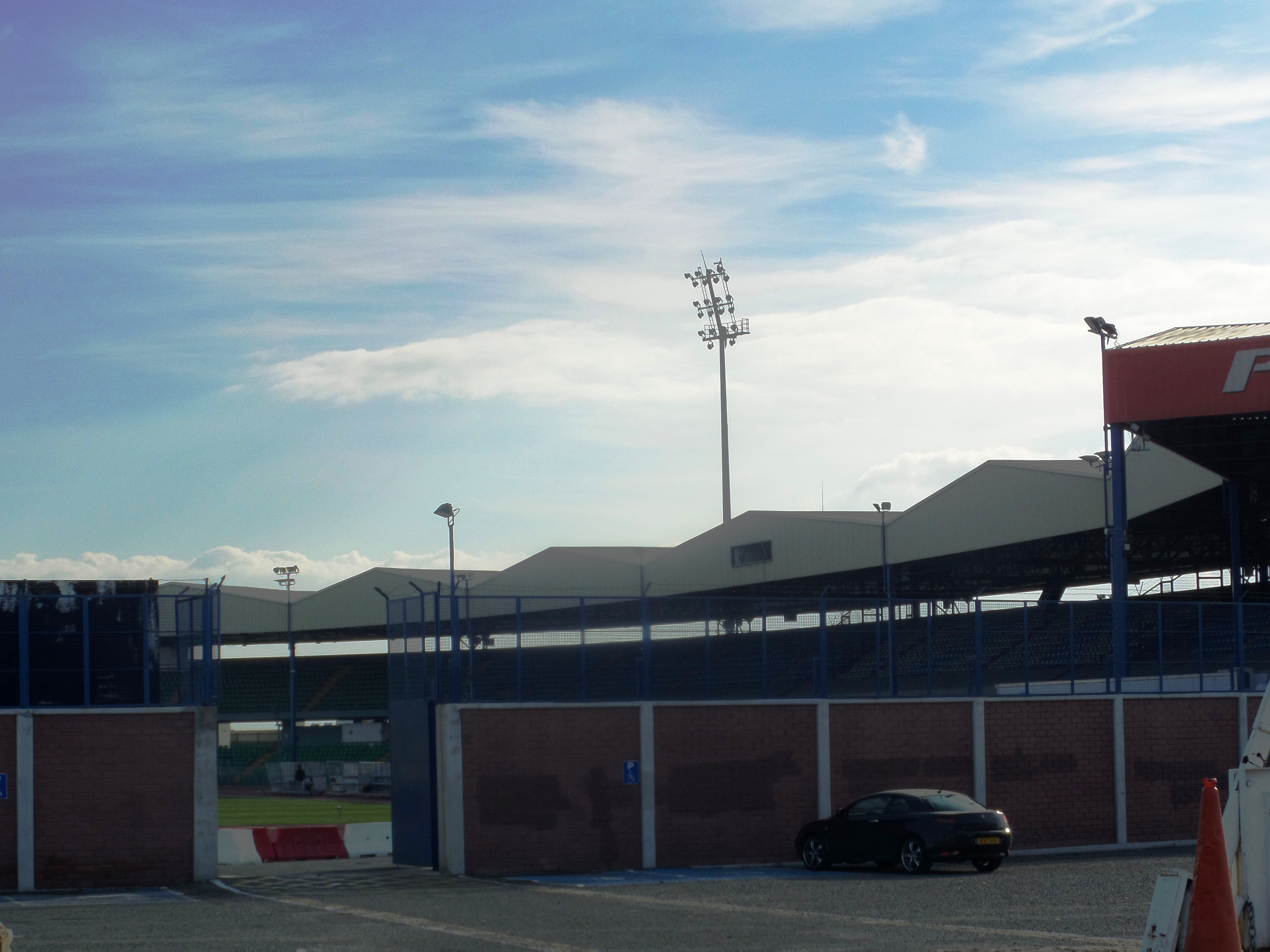
- All matches used to be played at Tsirion Stadium but now contest at the Alphamega Stadium
- Location: Limassol
- Teams: AEL Limassol; Apollon Limassol; Aris Limassol

Statistics
- Most wins: AEL (71)

The Limassol derby (Greek: Ντέρμπι Λεμεσού) refers to Limassol's local derby, football matches played between any two of AEL, Apollon and Aris, all played at Alphamega Stadium. It is widely regarded as one of the fiercest football rivalries in Cyprus due to continuous fights and riots amongst the teams' fans.

The main derby is between Apollon and AEL, due to the large number of supporters the clubs have, the titles that both clubs have won in the past, and the historical rivalry between the two clubs.

== Background ==
The rivalry is most intense in matches involving AEL and Apollon as they historically play in the same division. The rivalry as a whole, however, had formed mostly due to all teams sharing the same home stadium, although recent league competitiveness also played an important role in its formation.

== Records and statistics ==
=== Summary ===
Team	Played	Won	Drawn	Lost	Goals For	Goals Against
AEL	51	22	13	16	71	60
Apollon	47	22	9	16	69	63
Aris	28	5	6	17	26	23
Total	126	49	28	49	163	146

=== Statistics by competition ===
==== Apollon-AEL ====
Competition	Played	Apollon	Draws	AEL
First Division	30	11		
Cypriot Cup	8	3	1	4
Total	35	14	8	16

==== Apollon-Aris ====
Competition	Played	Apollon	Draws	Aris
First Division	12	8	1	3
Cypriot Cup	0	0	0	0
Total	12	8	1	3

Source: World Football
Last updated: 15 March 2015

==== AEL-Aris ====
Competition	Played	AEL	Draws	Aris
First Division	14	9	4	1
Cypriot Cup	2	0	1	1
Total	16	9	5	2

Source: World Football
Last updated: 15 March 2015

=== Results ===
"Domestic League" results only refer to matches played within the first phase of the season and do not include any after season play-off matches

==== Apollon-AEL ====
===== Domestic league =====
Note: list only includes last ten matches

Season	Division	Round	Date	Hosts	Score
2010-11	First Division	8th Round	30.10.2010	Apollon	3 – 0
2010-11	First Division	21st Round	12.02.2011	AEL	2 – 3
2011-12	First Division	12th Round	03.12.2011	Apollon	0 – 3
2011-12	First Division	25th Round	18.03.2012	AEL	3 – 0
2012-13	First Division	3rd Round	24.09.2012	Apollon	0 – 0
2012-13	First Division	16th Round	05.01.2013	AEL	3 – 2
2013-14	First Division	10th Round	23.11.2013	Apollon	0 – 1
2013-14	First Division	23rd Round	22.02.2014	AEL	0 – 1
2014-15	First Division	4th Round	22.09.2014	AEL	1 – 2
2014-15	First Division	15th Round	03.01.2015	Apollon	3 – 3

Source: World Football
Last updated: 15 March 2015

===== Other competitions =====
Note: list only includes last ten matches

Season	Competition	Stage	Date	Hosts	Score
2008-09	Cypriot Cup	Semi-finals	15.04.2009	Apollon	1 – 1
2008-09	Cypriot Cup	Semi-finals	06.05.2009	AEL	2 – 1 ^{1}
2009-10	Cypriot Cup	Semi-finals	14.04.2010	AEL	0 – 1
2009-10	Cypriot Cup	Semi-finals	28.04.2010	Apollon	1 – 0
2010-11	First Division Group B	1st Round	02.04.2011	AEL	1 – 1
2010-11	First Division Group B	5th Round	07.05.2011	Apollon	3 – 1
2012-13	Cypriot Cup	Final	22.05.2013	AEL	1 – 2^{1}
2013-14	First Division (Championship group)	3rd Round	05.04.2014	Apollon	1 – 1
2013-14	First Division (Championship group)	8th Round	07.05.2014	AEL	0 – 1
TBD

Source: World Football
Last updated: 15 March 2015

==== Apollon-Aris ====
===== Domestic league =====
Note: list only includes last ten matches

Season	Division	Round	Date	Hosts	Score
2006-07	First Division	5th Round	23.09.2006	Apollon	1 – 0
2006-07	First Division	18th Round	28.01.2007	Aris	1 – 2
2007-08	First Division	12th Round	08.12.2007	Apollon	2 – 1
2007-08	First Division	25th Round	15.03.2008	Aris	3 – 1
2009-10	First Division	3rd Round	19.09.2009	Aris	1 – 1
2009-10	First Division	16th Round	09.01.2010	Apollon	3 – 0
2011-12	First Division	11th Round	27.11.2011	Aris	2 – 0
2011-12	First Division	24th Round	11.03.2012	Apollon	1 – 2
2013-14	First Division	13th Round	16.12.2013	Aris	0 – 1
2013-14	First Division	26th Round	19.03.2014	Apollon	3 – 2

Source: World Football
Last updated: 15 March 2015

===== Other competitions =====
Note: list only includes last ten matches

Season	Competition	Stage	Date	Hosts	Score
TBD

Source: World Football
Last updated: 15 March 2015

==== AEL-Aris ====
===== Domestic league =====
Note: list only includes last ten matches

Season	Division	Round	Date	Hosts	Score
2006-07	First Division	12th Round	26.11.2006	Aris	1 – 2
2006-07	First Division	25th Round	28.04.2007	AEL	3 – 3
2007-08	First Division	6th Round	21.10.2007	AEL	0 – 0
2007-08	First Division	19th Round	03.02.2008	Aris	2 – 1
2009-10	First Division	9th Round	15.11.2009	AEL	1 – 0
2009-10	First Division	22nd Round	21.02.2010	Aris	0 – 0
2011-12	First Division	5th Round	01.10.2011	Aris	0 – 1
2011-12	First Division	18th Round	28.01.2012	AEL	1 – 0
2013-14	First Division	7th Round	27.10.2013	AEL	2 – 1
2013-14	First Division	20th Round	05.02.2014	AEL	1 – 1

Source: World Football
Last updated: 15 March 2015

===== Other competitions =====
Note: list only includes last ten matches

Season	Competition	Stage	Date	Hosts	Score
2007-08	First Division (Relegation Group)	2nd Round	05.04.2008	Aris	0 – 2
2007-08	First Division (Relegation Group)	6th Round	10.05.2008	AEL	3 – 2
2010-11	Cypriot Cup	Round of 16	12.01.2011	AEL	0 – 1
2010-11	Cypriot Cup	Round of 16	26.01.2011	Aris	0 – 0
TBD

Source: World Football
Last updated: 15 March 2015

Notes:

1 Won after extra time.

== See also ==
- Sports Rivalry
- Local derby
- List of association football rivalries in Europe
