= Borce Gjurev =

Cypriot footballer (born 1969)

Borče Gjurev
Personal information
- Date of birth: 2 August 1969 (age 57)
- Place of birth: SR Macedonia
- Position: Midfielder

Senior career*
| Years | Team | Apps | (Gls) |
| 1988–1991 | FC Homburg | 23 | (2) |
| 1991–1993 | Genk | 13 | (1) |
| 1993–2007 | Ethnikos Achna | 301 | (71) |
| Total | | 337 | (74) |

International career
| 2000–2002 | Cyprus | 3 | (0) |

Managerial career
- 2015: Ethnikos Achna
- * Club domestic league appearances and goals

Borce Gjurev (born 2 August 1969) is a former professional footballer who played as a midfielder. Born in SR Macedonia, he made three appearances for Cyprus.

== International career ==
Gjurev made his senior debut for Cyprus national team in an October 2000 FIFA World Cup qualification match against the Netherlands and has earned a total of three caps. His final international was a May 2002 friendly match away against Greece.
