= Ton Caanen =

Dutch football manager (born 1966)

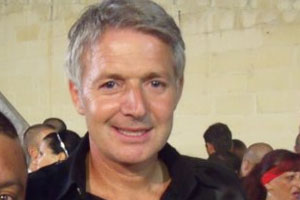

Personal information
- Date of birth: 18 March 1966 (age 60)
- Place of birth: Geleen, Netherlands

Youth career
- Be Quick 1887

Senior career*
Years	Team	Apps	(Gls)
- Be Quick 1887
- VV Sittard
- FC Geleen Zuid

Managerial career
- 1999–2001: FC Geleen Zuid
- 2001–2003: Roda JC (youth)
- 2004: Metalurh Donetsk
- 2005: Beitar Jerusalem
- 2005–2006: Maccabi Tel Aviv
- 2006–2007: Stal Alchevsk
- 2009–2010: Valletta
- 2010–2011: AEK Larnaca
- 2012–2013: Enosis Neon Paralimni
- 2013: Veria
- 2013–2014: Aris Limassol
- 2014–2015: De Treffers
- 2015: Apollon Limassol
- 2015–2017: Roda JC (technical director)
- 2018: FK Senica
- 2018–2019: FK Senica (general manager)
- * Club domestic league appearances and goals

Ton Caanen (born 18 March 1966) is a Dutch football manager.

== Managerial career ==
Caanen was born in Geleen, Netherlands. Aside from a few years in the amateur Dutch leagues, he never played professional football. He got his start as a manager in his hometown club FC Geleen Zuid while also working as a salesman for the local Toyota dealership.

After two years with FC Geleen Zuid he started to work as the youth manager of Roda JC.

=== Metalurh Donetsk ===
In January 2004 he made his way to the Ukrainian Premier League as he signed as manager of Metalurh Donetsk. He left the club at the end of the season.

=== Beitar Jerusalem ===
When Arcadi Gaydamak bought the Israeli football club, Beitar Jerusalem, he looked for someone who would be able to give the club a look over and see what changes needed to be made. Caanen was brought in and after a short time was given the reigns of the club after Eli Ohana, stepped down from the manager position.

Continuing with the same squad as Ohana had, Kaanen was able to produce good results making him a 'lifeline' to hopes in the club that they would be able to qualify for a continental competition (UEFA Champions League or UEFA Cup). When Luis Fernandez was appointed general manager over Caanen, there was a lot of friction over Caanen's qualifications to manage a club looking to become a European power. Caanen was soon fired but made a lasting impression on the Israeli public that would later pay dividends.

=== Replacing Nir Klinger ===
When the Maccabi Tel Aviv boardroom had enough of the poor results on the pitch during the club's 100 year anniversary, it was evident that Israeli manager Nir Klinger was on his way out. Caanen was appointed interim manager. Despite two big money "name" signings the team were a disaster typified by a 4–0 loss to Second Division Hapoel Acre in the Cup.

=== Maccabi Netanya ===
On 4 June 2006, Caanen was appointed as the manager of Maccabi Netanya but never managed a single game after being sacked a week later.

=== Stal Alchevsk ===
Caanen made a quick return to management later that month with a one-year deal to manage Ukrainian Premier League club Stal Alchevsk.

=== Valletta ===
In June 2009 Caanen signed a contract as the coach of the Maltese club Valletta. He took Jordi Cruyff with him to the island as an assistant coach and player. The two worked before together at Metalurh Donetsk.

=== AEK Larnaca ===
In summer of 2010 Jordi Cruyff announced his retirement from professional football and joined AEK Larnaca as Director of Football. He signed Caanen as head coach, and the pair worked to establish the team as a new football powerhouse in Cyprus.

=== Veria ===
On 1 September 2013, the Greek superleague side Veria F.C. announced that Caanen was appointed as the team coach. After a few weeks he quit.

=== Aris Limassol ===
At the end of October 2013, he signed with Aris Limassol until the end of the season.

=== De Treffers ===
In June 2014, Caanen became manager of Dutch Topklasse side De Treffers.

== Managerial stats ==
Team	Nat	From	To	Record				
Team	Nat	From	To	P	W	D	L	Win %
Metalurh Donetsk	(Ukraine)	1 January 2004	30 June 2004	15	7	5	3	46.67
Beitar Jerusalem	(Israel)	17 September 2005	12 December 2005	15	9	1	5	60.00
Maccabi Tel Aviv	(Israel)	25 December 2005	30 May 2006	25	8	9	8	32.00
Stal Alchevsk	(Ukraine)	14 July 2006	30 June 2007	29	4	7	18	13.79
Valletta	(Malta)	1 July 2009	30 May 2010	35	23	7	5	65.71
AEK Larnaca	(Cyprus)	1 July 2010	11 November 2011	52	19	15	18	36.54
Paralimni	(Cyprus)	27 September 2012	30 June 2013	29	7	8	14	24.14
Veria	(Greece)	2 September 2013	29 September 2013	3	0	0	3	0.00
Aris Limassol	(Cyprus)	23 October 2013	30 May 2014	29	6	10	13	20.69
De Treffers	(Netherlands)	22 June 2014	9 April 2015	28	12	7	9	42.86
Apollon Limassol	(Cyprus)	9 April 2015	24 May 2015	6	2	1	3	33.33
FK Senica	(Slovakia)	8 February 2018		12	4	3	5	33.33
Total				280	103	73	104	36.79

== Honours ==
=== As a manager ===
- Maltese Cup: 2009–10
- Maltese Premier League runner-up: 2009-10
