= Christakis Christoforou =

Cypriot footballer (born 1964)

Personal information
- Date of birth: 26 January 1964 (age 62)
- Place of birth: Cyprus

Senior career*
Years	Team	Apps	(Gls)
1982–1989	AEL Limassol		
1989–1991	APOEL Nicosia		
1991–1997	AEL Limassol		

International career
1987	Cyprus		

Managerial career
- 2013–2014: Apollon Limassol
- 2014–2015: AEL Limassol
- 2015–2017: Cyprus
- 2020 - sometime after 2020: Apollon Ladies
- * Club domestic league appearances and goals

Christakis Christoforou (born 26 January 1964) is a Cypriot football manager and former player who last managed the Cyprus national team.

== Playing career ==
Christoforou was born Limassol. He played as a midfielder for AEL Limassol and APOEL. He was capped twice for the Cyprus national team in 1987.

== Managerial statistics ==
As of match played 9 June 2017

Team	From	To	Record				
Team	From	To	G	W	D	L	Win %
Cyprus	2015	Present	10	3	1	6	30.00
