= Floros Nicolaou =

Cypriot footballer (born 1962)

Personal information
- Date of birth: 12 September 1962 (age 64)
- Position: Forward

Senior career*
Years	Team	Apps	(Gls)
1984–1991	Nea Salamis Famagusta FC		
1991–1993	Pezoporikos Larnaca FC		
1996–1997	APOEL FC		

International career
1985–1992	Cyprus	39	(2)

Managerial career
- 2013–2014: AEK Larnaca FC
- 2015: Nea Salamis Famagusta FC (caretaker)
- * Club domestic league appearances and goals

Floros Nicolaou (Greek: Φλώρος Νικολάου; born 12 September 1962) is a retired Cypriot football striker.
