= Christos Poyiatzis =

Cypriot footballer and coach (born 1978)

Personal information
- Full name: Christos Poyiatzis
- Date of birth: 12 April 1978 (age 48)
- Place of birth: Famagusta, Cyprus
- Height: 1.77 m (5 ft 10 in)
- Position: Midfielder

Senior career*
Years	Team	Apps	(Gls)
1995–2017	Ethnikos Achna	416	(57)

International career
	Cyprus U18	2	(0)
	Cyprus U21	10	(5)
2000–2004	Cyprus	6	(1)

Managerial career
- 2018: Ethnikos Achna
- * Club domestic league appearances and goals

Christos Poyiatzis (born 12 April 1978) is a Cypriot football coach and a former midfielder.

== Club career ==
He was the captain of Ethnikos Achna and has played at the club his entire career, becoming one of the longest-serving one-club men in football.
