= Nicos Panayiotou =

Cypriot footballer (born 1970)

Personal information
- Full name: Nicos Panayiotou
- Date of birth: December 6, 1970 (age 55)
- Place of birth: Famagusta, Cyprus
- Height: 1.90 m (6 ft 3 in)
- Position: Goalkeeper

Senior career*
Years	Team	Apps	(Gls)
1987–2004	Anorthosis Famagusta	293	(1)
2004–2005	AEK Larnaca	25	(0)
2005–2006	Panachaiki	24	(0)
2006–2007	Ayia Napa	23	(0)
Total		365	(1)

International career^{‡}
1994–2006	Cyprus	74	(0)

Managerial career
- 2009: ASIL
- 2009–2011: Anorthosis (Youth Coach)
- 2011–2013: Cyprus U17
- 2013–2014: Ermis Aradippou
- 2014–2015: Nea Salamina
- 2015–2017: Ermis Aradippou
- 2018: Aris Limassol
- 2022–2023: Ypsonas
- * Club domestic league appearances and goals as of 11 January 2019 ‡ National team caps and goals as of 17 March 2008

Nicos Panayiotou (born December 6, 1970) is a former international Cypriot football goalkeeper. He started his career from Anorthosis. He played there for seventeen years. He was the captain of Anorthosis. Then, he moved to AEK Larnaca where he played for a year and after to Panachaiki for another year and finished his career at 2007 playing for Ayia Napa. He was in charge of Anorthosis's academies.
