= Ethnikos Achna FC =

Professional football club based in Akrotiri and Dhekelia

Ethnikos Achnas
- Full name: Ethnikos Achnas Football Club
- Nickname: Achniotes (The Achnas ones)
- Founded: 1968; 58 years ago
- Ground: Dasaki Stadium
- Capacity: 7,000
- Chairman: Kikis Filippou
- Manager: Igor Angelovski
- League: Second Division
- 2025–26: First Division, 13th of 14 (relegated)
- Website: ethnikosachnasfc.com
Home colours	Away colours

Ethnikos Achna Football Club (Greek: Αθλητικός Σύλλογος Εθνικός Άχνας), commonly known as Ethnikos Achna or simply Ethnikos, is a professional football club based in the village of Dasaki Achnas in Akrotiri and Dhekelia, on the island of Cyprus. Founded in 1968, the club currently plays in the Cypriot First Division. Ethnikos' home ground is the Dasaki Stadium, which can accommodate 7,000 spectators.

== History ==
The club played in the Cypriot Second Division until 1983 when it was promoted to the Cypriot First Division but was immediately relegated. Ethnikos was promoted to the First Division again in 1986 and stayed there for four seasons. Another two years in the Second Division ended with promotion to the First Division in 1992, where Ethnikos remained until their relegation again in 2018.

The team's best overall national ranking is fourth in the 1994–95, 1997–98 and 2006–07 seasons. The club participated in the Cypriot Cup final twice; once in 2002, where they were beaten by Anorthosis Famagusta 0–1, and again in 2022 when they were beaten by Omonoia in a penalty shootout after a 0–0 score in normal and extra time.

=== European Competitions ===
Ethnikos has competed in the UEFA Intertoto Cup six times: In 1998, 2003, 2004, 2006, 2007 and 2008. Five of those times, they were eliminated in the first round. However, in 2006, Ethnikos won the Intertoto Cup and was one of the eleven winners of that year's competition. After eliminating Albanian side Partizani Tirana, they faced Croatian side NK Osijek. They tied both matches, but Ethnikos advanced on away goals, and became the first team from the Cypriot league system to have reached the third round of the Intertoto Cup. There, they beat Maccabi Petah Tikva 4–3 on aggregate, and became one of the competition's eleven winners. This meant that Ethnikos had qualified for the 2006–07 UEFA Cup.

In the UEFA Cup, Ethnikos eliminated Roeselare with a 2–1 loss in Belgium and a 5–0 victory in Cyprus, qualifying for the first round. They were eliminated by Lens after drawing the first leg at home (played at GSP Stadium, Nicosia) 0–0 and losing 3–1 in France. Because of their success in the Intertoto Cup, Ethnikos was named the Sports Team of the Year in 2006, by the Sports Journalists Union of Cyprus.

== Honours ==
=== Domestic ===
==== League ====
- Cypriot Second Division:
  - Winners (3): 1985–86, 1991–92, 2018–19

==== Cups ====
- Cypriot Cup:
  - Runner-up (2): 2001–02, 2021–22

=== International ===
- UEFA Intertoto Cup:
  - Joint Winner (1): 2006

== Players ==
As of 15 September 2026

Note: Flags indicate national team as defined under FIFA eligibility rules; some limited exceptions apply. Players may hold more than one non-FIFA nationality.

No.	Pos.	Nation	Player
1	GK	CYP	Demetris Stylianides
4	DF	CYP	Giorgos Andreou
5	DF	CYP	Frixos Michailidis
6	MF	BRA	Marcelo Alves
7	DF	CYP	Timotheos Pavlou
8	FW	NED	Amir Ismaïl
9	FW	CYP	Lefteris Alambritis
10	MF	POR	Márcio Meira
11	FW	CYP	Anastasios Okkarides
14	MF	CYP	Konstantinos Koumpari
16	MF	CYP	Antonis Christaki
17	FW	CPV	Vagner Gonçalves
22	MF	CYP	Theodosis Siathas
24	DF	CYP	Christos Pasiardis

No.	Pos.	Nation	Player
25	MF	FRA	Jordan Robinand
27	DF	CYP	Giorgos Kousiappa
29	FW	GRE	Giannis Bastianos
31	FW	BRA	Vilmar Júnior
34	DF	CYP	Alexandros Theocharous
38	GK	CYP	Ioakeim Toumpas
41	DF	GBS	Aladje N'Djai
44	MF	CYP	Nikolas Giallouros
47	FW	CYP	Nikolas Perdios
66	DF	BUL	Kristian Yordanov
—	MF	CYP	Andreas Neofytou
—	DF	CYP	Lefteris Chatzikonstanti
—	DF	CYP	Michalis Parlatas

=== Out on loan ===
Note: Flags indicate national team as defined under FIFA eligibility rules; some limited exceptions apply. Players may hold more than one non-FIFA nationality.

No.	Pos.	Nation	Player

== Historical list of coaches ==
- (Bulgaria) Aleksandar Kostov (1984–1987)
- (Cyprus) Andreas Mouskallis (1990–1991)
- (Cyprus) Andreas Mouskallis (1992–1993)
- (Montenegro) Slobodan Vučeković (1996–1998)
- (Serbia) Momčilo Vukotić (1998–1999)
- (Montenegro) Slobodan Vučeković (2001–2002)
- (Serbia) Svetozar Šapurić (2003–2004)
- (Montenegro) Slobodan Vučeković (2004)
- (Serbia) Mihailo Ivanović (2005)
- (Greece) Myron Sifakis (2005)
- (Cyprus) Panicos Orphanides (2005–2006)
- (Serbia) Svetozar Šapurić (2006–2008)
- (Belgium) Stéphane Demol (2008–09)
- (Cyprus) Panicos Orphanides (2009)
- (Serbia) Svetozar Šapurić (2009–2011)
- (North Macedonia) Čedomir Janevski (2011–12)
- (Greece) Nikolaos Papadopoulos (2012)
- (Cyprus) Nikos Andronikou (2012)
- (England) Stephen Constantine (2012–13)
- (Greece) Nikolaos Kolompourdas (2013–2014)
- (Cyprus) Stavros Papadopoulos (2014)
- (Cyprus) Apostolos Makridis (2014–2015)
- (North Macedonia) Borce Gjurev (2015)
- (Serbia) Danilo Dončić (2015–2016)
- (Lithuania) Valdas Ivanauskas (2016–2017)
- (Cyprus) Panagiotis Engomitis (2017)
- (Georgia (country)) Giorgi Chikhradze (2017–2018)
- (Cyprus) Christos Poyiatzis (2018)
- (Cyprus) Panagiotis Engomitis (2018–2019)
- (Croatia) Dean Klafurić (2020)
- (North Macedonia) Bojan Markoski (2020)
- (Cyprus) Apostolos Makridis (2020)
- (Cyprus) Elias Charalambous (2020–2021)
- (Spain) David Badía (2021–2022)
- (Slovenia) Andrej Razdrh (2022)
- (Spain) Marcote (2022)
- (Bosnia and Herzegovina) Vule Trivunović (2022)
- (Cyprus) Pambos Christodoulou (2022–2023)
- (Spain) Ángel López (2023)
- (Cyprus) Marinos Satsias (2023–2024)
- (North Macedonia) Borce Gjurev (2024)
- (Spain) David Badía (2024–2025)
- (Portugal) Hugo Martins (2025)
- (North Macedonia) Igor Angelovski (2025)
- (Portugal) Rui Ferreira (2025–2026)
- (Serbia) Vesko Mihajlović (2026–)

== Ethnikos Achna in European competitions ==
=== Overall ===
Competition	Pld	W	D	L	GF	GA	GD
UEFA Cup	4	1	1	2	7	5	+2
UEFA Intertoto Cup	16	4	6	6	20	30	−10
Total	20	6	8	6	27	35	–8

=== Matches ===
Season	Competition	Round	Club	1st leg	2nd leg	Agg.
1998	UEFA Intertoto Cup	1R	(Sweden) Örgryte	2–1 (H)	0–4 (A)	2–5
2003	UEFA Intertoto Cup	1R	(Hungary) Győri ETO	1–1 (A)	2–2 (H)	3–3 (a)
2004	UEFA Intertoto Cup	1R	(North Macedonia) Vardar	1–5 (H)	1–5 (A)	2–10
2006	UEFA Intertoto Cup	1R	(Albania) Partizani	4–2 (H)	1–2 (A)	5–4
2006	UEFA Intertoto Cup	2R	(Croatia) Osijek	2–2 (A)	0–0 (H)	2–2 (a)
2006	UEFA Intertoto Cup	3R	(Israel) Maccabi Petah Tikva	2–0 (A)	2–3 (H)	4–3
2006–07	UEFA Cup	2Q	(Belgium) Roeselare	1–2 (A)	5–0 (H)	6–2
2006–07	UEFA Cup	1R	(France) Lens	0–0 (H)	1–3 (A)	1–3
2007	UEFA Intertoto Cup	1R	(North Macedonia) Makedonija GP	1–0 (H)	0–2 (A)	1–2
2008	UEFA Intertoto Cup	1R	(Albania) Besa	0–0 (A)	1–1 (H)	1–1 (a)

Notes

- QR: Qualifying round
- 1Q: First qualifying round
- 2Q: Second qualifying round
- 3Q: Third qualifying round
- PO: Play-off round
