= 2025–26 AC Omonia season =

Cypriot football club season

Omonia
2025–26 season
- President: Stavros Papastavrou
- Manager: Henning Berg
- Stadium: GSP Stadium
- Cypriot First Division: 1st
- Cypriot Cup: Quarter-finals
- UEFA Conference League: Knockout phase play-offs
- Top goalscorer: League: Ryan Mmaee (23)
- Biggest win: 5–0 v Araz-Naxçıvan (Home, 14 August 2025, UEFA Conference League); 5–0 v AEL Limassol (Home, 22 September 2025, Cypriot First Division); 5–0 v Anorthosis Famagusta (Away, 28 September 2025, Cypriot First Division); 5–0 v Olympiakos Nicosia (Home, 15 March 2026, Cypriot First Division)
- Biggest defeat: 0–2 v Apollon Limassol (Away, 23 November 2025, Cypriot First Division); 1–3 v Rijeka (Away, 26 February 2026, UEFA Conference League)
Home colours	Away colours	Third colours

The 2025–26 season was AC Omonia's 72nd consecutive season in the Cypriot First Division and 77th season in existence as a football club. In addition to the domestic league, Omonia participated in the Cypriot Cup and the UEFA Conference League.

== Squad ==
Squad at end of season

Note: Flags indicate national team as defined under FIFA eligibility rules; some limited exceptions apply. Players may hold more than one non-FIFA nationality.

No.	Pos.	Nation	Player
2	DF	SEN	Alpha Diounkou
3	DF	GRE	Fotis Kitsos
5	DF	MLI	Senou Coulibaly
6	MF	NED	Carel Eiting
7	FW	CPV	Willy Semedo
8	FW	MNE	Stevan Jovetić
10	FW	GRE	Anastasios Chatzigiovanis
11	MF	BRA	Ewandro
14	MF	BIH	Mateo Marić
17	DF	MAR	Saad Agouzoul
18	FW	RSA	Mihlali Mayambela
19	FW	MAR	Ryan Mmaee
20	FW	CYP	Evangelos Andreou
21	DF	GRE	Giannis Masouras
22	MF	SWE	Muamer Tanković
23	GK	NGR	Francis Uzoho

No.	Pos.	Nation	Player
27	DF	CZE	Stefan Simić
28	DF	ENG	Moses Odubajo
29	DF	SLO	Jure Balkovec
30	DF	CYP	Nikolas Panagiotou
31	MF	CYP	Ioannis Kousoulos
33	MF	POL	Mateusz Musiałowski
40	GK	CYP	Fabiano
44	MF	MNE	Novica Eraković
74	MF	CYP	Panagiotis Andreou
78	GK	CYP	Pantelis Michail
82	DF	CYP	Andreas Christou
85	FW	CYP	Angelos Neophytou
90	DF	CYP	Christos Konstantinidis
91	FW	CYP	Konstantinos Panagi
98	GK	CYP	Charalampos Kyriakidis

== Competitions ==
=== Overview ===
Competition	First match	Last match	Starting round	Final position	Record							
Competition	First match	Last match	Starting round	Final position	Pld	W	D	L	GF	GA	GD	Win %
Cypriot First Division	31 August 2025	22 May 2026	Matchday 1	Winners	36	27	6	3	88	24	+64	75.00
Cypriot Cup	14 January 2026	4 February 2026	Second round	Quarter-finals	2	1	0	1	3	3	+0	50.00
UEFA Conference League	24 July 2025	26 February 2026	Second qualifying round	Knockout phase play-offs	14	7	2	5	22	10	+12	50.00
Total					52	35	8	9	113	37	+76	67.31

Source: Competitions

=== Cypriot First Division ===
==== Regular season ====
===== League table =====
Pos	Team	Pld	W	D	L	GF	GA	GD	Pts	Qualification or relegation
1	Omonia	26	19	4	3	63	17	+46	61	Qualification for the Championship round
2	AEK Larnaca	26	16	5	5	49	22	+27	53	Qualification for the Championship round
3	Apollon Limassol	26	16	5	5	36	22	+14	53	Qualification for the Championship round
4	Pafos	26	16	3	7	53	24	+29	51	Qualification for the Championship round
5	APOEL	26	13	6	7	45	27	+18	45	Qualification for the Championship round

Source: Cyprus Football Association
Rules for classification: 1) Points; 2) Head-to-head points; 3) Head-to-head goal difference; 4) Head-to-head goals scored; 5) Head-to-head away goals scored (only if two teams); 6) Goal difference; 7) Goals scored; 8) Play-off (only if deciding championship round, relegation round or relegation).

===== Results summary =====
Overall								Home						Away					
Pld	W	D	L	GF	GA	GD	Pts	W	D	L	GF	GA	GD	W	D	L	GF	GA	GD
26	19	4	3	63	17	+46	61	10	3	0	32	5	+27	9	1	3	31	12	+19

Source: Soccerway

===== Results by round =====
Round	1	2	3	4	5	6	7	8	9	10	11	12	13	14	15	16	17	18	19	20	21	22	23	24	25	26
Ground	H	A	H	H	A	H	A	H	A	H	A	H	A	A	H	A	A	H	A	H	A	H	A	H	A	H
Result	W	L	W	W	W	D	W	W	W	D	L	W	W	D	W	W	W	W	W	W	W	W	L	D	W	W
Position	5	7	3	1	1	3	2	1	1	1	2	3	2	2	2	2	2	1	1	1	1	1	1	1	1	1
Points	3	3	6	9	12	13	16	19	22	23	23	26	29	30	33	36	39	42	45	48	51	54	54	55	58	61

Source: Worldfootball.net
A = Away; H = Home; W = Win; D = Draw; L = Loss

==== Matches ====
31 August 2025 2	Ethnikos Achna	2–1	Omonia	Achna
19:00 EEST (UTC+3)	Andereggen (yellow card) 11', (goal) 45+5', 64'; Almeida (yellow card) 14'; Ofori (yellow card) 2' (yellow-red card) 38'; Confais (yellow card) 60'; Toumpas (yellow card) 77'	Report	Diounkou (yellow card) 72'; Semedo 81' (pen.); Loizou (yellow card) 90'	Stadium: Dasaki Stadium; Attendance: 2,500; Referee: C. Theouli

13 September 2025 3	Omonia	3–0	Akritas Chlorakas	Nicosia
19:00 EEST (UTC+3)	Mmaee 34'; Chatzigiovanis 45+1'; Coulibaly (yellow card) 55'; Semedo 59'; Khammas (yellow card) 73'	Report	Chatzipaschalis (yellow card) 37'; Castro (yellow card) 84'	Stadium: GSP Stadium; Attendance: 7,500; Referee: K. Athanassiou

17 September 2025 1	Omonia	1–0	AEK Larnaca	Nicosia
19:00 EEST (UTC+3)	Ewandro (yellow card) 63'; Eiting 79'	Report	Amyn (yellow card) 58'; Cabrera (yellow card) 68'; Ekpolo (yellow card) 83'; Bajić (yellow card) 89'; Miličević (yellow card) 90+5'	Stadium: GSP Stadium; Attendance: 1,000; Referee: D. Solomou

22 September 2025 4	Omonia	5–0	AEL Limassol	Nicosia
19:00 EEST (UTC+3)	Coulibaly 22'; Semedo 51'; E. Andreou 76'; Kousoulos 78'; Neofytou 84'	Report	Keller (yellow card) 36'; Natel (yellow card) 43'; Glavčić (yellow card) 45+1'; Conceição (yellow card) 66'	Stadium: GSP Stadium; Attendance: 8,300; Referee: K. Fellas

28 September 2025 5	Anorthosis Famagusta	0–5	Omonia	Larnaca
19:00 EEST (UTC+3)	Ilia (yellow card) 15'; Sosa (yellow card) 34'; Katelaris (yellow card) 41'; Thandi (yellow card) 48'; Kiko (yellow card) 55'	Report	Mmaee 1'; Tanković 17'; Marić (yellow card) 25'; Semedo (yellow card) 44', (goal) 49' (pen.), 56'; Agouzoul (yellow card) 45'; Neofytou 77'	Stadium: Antonis Papadopoulos Stadium; Attendance: 7,000; Referee: I. Christodoulou

5 October 2025 6	Omonia	0–0	Aris Limassol	Nicosia
20:00 EEST (UTC+3)	Ewandro (yellow card) 80'	Report	Bourhane (yellow card) 21' (yellow-red card) 23'; McCausland (yellow card) 38'; Kakoullis (yellow card) 76'; Nikolić (yellow card) 87'	Stadium: GSP Stadium; Attendance: 8,300; Referee: K. Athanassiou

19 October 2025 7	Krasava	1–2	Omonia	Larnaca
18:00 EEST (UTC+3)	Lipski 7'; Bahassa (yellow card) 22'; Kyriakou (yellow card) 78'	Report	Agouzoul (yellow card) 24'; Mmaee 75'; Chatzigiovanis 89', (yellow card) 90'	Stadium: Ammochostos Stadium; Attendance: 2,000; Referee: A. Tehrani

27 October 2025 8	Omonia	2–1	Pafos	Nicosia
19:00 EET (UTC+2)	Tanković (yellow card) 45+3'; Marić (yellow card) 61'; Semedo 65', 90+5' (pen.); Berg (yellow card) 71' (not on pitch)	Report	Šunjić (yellow card) 2'; Dragomir 15'; Carcedo (yellow card) 62' (not on pitch); David Luiz (yellow card) 63'	Stadium: GSP Stadium; Attendance: 10,400; Referee: P. Chatzigeorgiou

1 November 2025 9	Enosis Neon Paralimni	0–2	Omonia	Paralimni
19:00 EET (UTC+2)	Balua (yellow card) 52'; Fangueiro (yellow card) 82' (not on pitch); Đira (yellow card) 90+8'	Report	Mmaee 3', (yellow card) 88'; Jovetić 33'; Kitsos (yellow card) 44'; Tanković (yellow card) 65'	Stadium: Tasos Markou Stadium; Attendance: 1,500; Referee: A. Tehrani

9 November 2025 10	Omonia	2–2	APOEL	Nicosia
19:00 EET (UTC+2)	Panagiotou 5'; Mmaee 71'; Tanković (yellow card) 78'; Marić (yellow card) 83'; Agouzoul (yellow card) 87'	Report	Corbu 11'; Sotiriou (yellow card) 46'; Meyer (yellow card) 90+6'; Diamantakos 90+8'	Stadium: GSP Stadium; Attendance: 14,181; Referee: K. Fellas

23 November 2025 11	Apollon Limassol	2–0	Omonia	Limassol
19:00 EET (UTC+2)	Rodrigues 19'; Weissbeck (yellow card) 45+1'; Duodu (yellow card) 50' (yellow-red card) 53'; Kvída 76'; Kühn (yellow card) 89'	Report	Agouzoul (yellow card) 57'; Tanković (yellow card) 90+5'	Stadium: Alphamega Stadium; Attendance: 7,000; Referee: M. Christoforou

1 December 2025 12	Omonia	3–1	Omonia Aradippou	Nicosia
19:00 EET (UTC+2)	Coulibaly 4'; Neofytou 6'; Chatzigiovanis 44'; Ewandro (yellow card) 74'; P. Andreou (yellow card) 85'	Report	Havelka (yellow card) 11'; Pontikos 70'; Ring (yellow card) 89'	Stadium: GSP Stadium; Attendance: 6,134; Referee: A. Konstantinidis

6 December 2025 13	Olympiakos Nicosia	0–3	Omonia	Nicosia
17:00 EET (UTC+2)		Report	Marić (yellow card) 22'; Semedo 35', 74'; Coulibaly (yellow card) 62'; Eraković 68'	Stadium: GSP Stadium; Attendance: 3,000; Referee: K. Fellas

15 December 2025 14	AEK Larnaca	1–1	Omonia	Larnaca
19:00 EET (UTC+2)	Cabrera 64', (yellow card) 84'; Amyn (yellow card) 75'; Gnali (yellow card) 78'	Report	Masouras 29'; Ewandro (yellow card) 66'; Coulibaly (yellow card) 90+2'; Kitsos (yellow card) 90+3'	Stadium: AEK Arena – Georgios Karapatakis; Attendance: 4,000; Referee: A. Menelaos

22 December 2025 15	Omonia	4–0	Ethnikos Achna	Nicosia
19:00 EET (UTC+2)	Panagiotou 24'; Eiting (yellow card) 29'; Jovetić (yellow card) 45', (goal) 79' (pen.); Semedo 61' (pen.); Tanković 70'	Report	Psaltis (yellow card) 45'; Pechlivanis (yellow card) 66'	Stadium: GSP Stadium; Attendance: 6,608; Referee: N. Liotatis

3 January 2026 16	Akritas Chlorakas	0–4	Omonia	Paphos
19:00 EET (UTC+2)	Taffertshofer (yellow card) 52'; Carlitos (yellow card) 90+1'	Report	Panagiotou 24'; Mmaee 65', 73'; Ewandro 68'	Stadium: Stelios Kyriakides Stadium; Referee: A. Konstantinidis

9 January 2026 17	AEL Limassol	0–2	Omonia	Limassol
19:00 EET (UTC+2)	Singh (yellow card) 53'; Stevanović (yellow card) 79'	Report	Jovetić 20'; Panagiotou (yellow card) 63'; Mmaee 89'	Stadium: Alphamega Stadium; Attendance: 4,000; Referee: K. Fellas

18 January 2026 18	Omonia	2–0	Anorthosis Famagusta	Nicosia
16:00 EET (UTC+2)	Mmaee 39'; Tanković (penalty missed) 80', 80'	Report	Kiko (yellow card) 7'; Sensi (yellow card) 75'; Karlstrøm (yellow card) 79'	Stadium: GSP Stadium; Attendance: 9,729; Referee: C. Theouli

25 January 2026 19	Aris Limassol	3–5	Omonia	Limassol
19:00 EET (UTC+2)	McCausland 22'; Kalulu (yellow card) 26'; Balogun 34'; Goldson (yellow card) 64'; Vaná (yellow card) 68'; Charalampous (yellow card) 74'; Paje 83'	Report	Mmaee 3', 14', 45+8', 53'; Semedo 27' (pen.); Fabiano (yellow card) 89'; P. Andreou (yellow card) 90+6'	Stadium: Alphamega Stadium; Attendance: 3,000; Referee: K. Fellas

1 February 2026 20	Omonia	1–0	Krasava	Nicosia
16:00 EET (UTC+2)	Coulibaly (yellow card) 23'; Panagiotou (yellow card) 33'; Jovetić 89'	Report	De Lucas (yellow card) 43'; Do Couto (yellow card) 53'; Rozada (yellow card) 90+2' (not on pitch); Pankov (yellow card) 90+3'	Stadium: GSP Stadium; Attendance: 8,558; Referee: K. Fotiou

8 February 2026 21	Pafos	2–4	Omonia	Paphos
19:00 EET (UTC+2)	Pileas 9'; Šunjić (yellow card) 28'; Quina (yellow card) 37'; Lelê 79'; David Luiz (yellow card) 90+7'	Report	Mmaee (yellow card) 7', (goal) 12'; Coulibaly (yellow card) 45+3'; Semedo 50', 81', 90', (yellow card) 81'; Masouras (yellow card) 79'; Marić (yellow card) 90+3'	Stadium: Stelios Kyriakides Stadium; Attendance: 6,495; Referee: M. Christoforou

14 February 2026 22	Omonia	3–0	Enosis Neon Paralimni	Nicosia
17:00 EET (UTC+2)	Semedo 45+2' (pen.); Mmaee 59'; E. Andreou 77'; Coulibaly (yellow card) 78'	Report	Cesco (yellow card) 22'; Okeke (yellow card) 32'; Imeri (yellow card) 45+7'; Katsiaris (yellow card) 80'; Goldschadt (yellow card) 87'	Stadium: GSP Stadium; Attendance: 6,935; Referee: K. Fotiou

22 February 2026 23	APOEL	1–0	Omonia	Nicosia
17:00 EET (UTC+2)	Rosa (yellow card) 43'; Olayinka 81'	Report	Chatzigiovanis (yellow card) 36'; Panagiotou (yellow card) 80'; Fabiano (yellow card) 90'	Stadium: GSP Stadium; Attendance: 9,575; Referee: M. Marchetti (Italy)

2 March 2026 24	Omonia	1–1	Apollon Limassol	Nicosia
19:00 EET (UTC+2)	Marić (yellow card) 25'; Tanković 40'	Report	Rodrigues 37'; Brandon (yellow card) 89'; Brown (yellow card) 90+4'	Stadium: GSP Stadium; Attendance: 12,864; Referee: D. Sylwestrzak (Poland)

7 March 2026 25	Omonia Aradippou	0–2	Omonia	Larnaca
19:00 EET (UTC+2)	Antoniou (yellow card) 23'; Edwards (yellow card) 73'	Report	Marić 18'; P. Andreou 28'	Stadium: Antonis Papadopoulos Stadium; Attendance: 2,000; Referee: C. Theouli

15 March 2026 26	Omonia	5–0	Olympiakos Nicosia	Nicosia
20:30 EET (UTC+2)	P. Andreou 2'; Ewandro 24', 50'; Tanković 30'; Mmaee 52'	Report	Bradonjić (yellow card) 58'	Stadium: GSP Stadium; Attendance: 6,294; Referee: I. Christodoulou

==== Championship round ====
===== Championship round table =====
Pos	Team	Pld	W	D	L	GF	GA	GD	Pts	Qualification	OMO	AEK	APL	PAF	APO	ARI
1	Omonia (C)	36	27	6	3	88	24	+64	87	Qualification for the Champions League second qualifying round	—	1–1	5–2	2–0	2–0	3–0
2	AEK Larnaca	36	20	9	7	62	33	+29	69	Qualification for the Conference League second qualifying round	0–2	—	1–0	2–2	1–0	2–0
3	Apollon Limassol	36	20	7	9	52	41	+11	67	Qualification for the Conference League second qualifying round	2–3	1–1	—	2–1	2–0	3–2
4	Pafos	36	18	8	10	66	38	+28	62	Qualification for the Europa League second qualifying round (Note: The winner of the 2025–26 Cypriot Cup (Pafos) qualified for the Europa League second qualifying round.)	0–2	1–1	1–1	—	2–0	2–0
5	APOEL	36	15	7	14	53	45	+8	52		0–3	1–0	2–3	3–3	—	2–1

Source: Soccerway
Legend: Blue = home team win; Yellow = draw; Red = away team win.
Rules for classification: 1) Points; 2) Points in regular season; 3) Head-to-head points in regular season; 4) Head-to-head goal difference in regular season; 5) Head-to-head goals scored in regular season; 6) Head-to-head away goals scored in regular season (if two teams tied); 7) Goal difference; 8) Goals scored; 9) Fair play ranking; 10) Drawing of lots.
(C) Champions

===== Results summary =====
Overall								Home						Away					
Pld	W	D	L	GF	GA	GD	Pts	W	D	L	GF	GA	GD	W	D	L	GF	GA	GD
10	8	2	0	25	7	+18	26	4	1	0	13	3	+10	4	1	0	12	4	+8

Source: Worldfootball

===== Results by round =====
Round	27	28	29	30	31	32	33	34	35	36
Ground	A	H	A	H	A	H	A	H	A	H
Result	D	W	W	W	W	W	W	D	W	W
Position	1	1	1	1	1	1	1	1	1	1
Points	62	65	68	71	74	77	80	81	84	87

Source: Worldfootball
A = Away; H = Home; W = Win; D = Draw; L = Loss

===== Matches =====
21 March 2026 27	Aris Limassol	2–2	Omonia	Limassol
17:00 EET (UTC+2)	Correia (yellow card) 43'; Effaghe 52'; Kastanos 60'; Lelle (yellow card) 81'	Report	Ewandro 33', (yellow card) 50'; Semedo 45+1'; P. Andreou (yellow card) 90+2'	Stadium: Alphamega Stadium; Attendance: 2,500; Referee: A. Menelaos

4 April 2026 28	Omonia	2–0	Pafos	Nicosia
19:00 EEST (UTC+3)	Semedo 11', (yellow card) 24'; Mmaee 19'; Ewandro (yellow card) 48'; Coulibaly (yellow card) 56'; Kyriakidis (yellow card) 78'; Marić (yellow card) 90+1'; Diounkou (yellow card) 90+1'	Report	Jajá (yellow card) 70'; Luckassen (yellow card) 87'; Pêpê (yellow card) 89'	Stadium: GSP Stadium; Attendance: 11,299; Referee: A. Treimanis (Latvia)

14 April 2026 29	AEK Larnaca	0–2	Omonia	Larnaca
19:00 EEST (UTC+3)	Ivanović (yellow card) 24'	Report	Mmaee 32', 66'; Panagiotou (yellow card) 90'	Stadium: AEK Arena – Georgios Karapatakis; Attendance: 4,480; Referee: D. Chiffi (Italy)

18 April 2026 30	Omonia	2–0	APOEL	Nicosia
18:00 EEST (UTC+3)	Mmaee 7', (yellow card) 90+6'; Ewandro 12'	Report	Olayinka (yellow card) 62'; Vitor Meer (yellow card) 68'; Rosa (yellow card) 90+6'	Stadium: GSP Stadium; Referee: L. Kuzma (Poland)

26 April 2026 31	Apollon Limassol	2–3	Omonia	Limassol
19:00 EEST (UTC+3)	Adoni 6'; Malekkidis 51', (yellow card) 61'; Rodrigues (yellow card) 85'	Report	Mmaee 29'; Ewandro (yellow card) 36'; Coulibaly 39', 69', (yellow card) 90+2' (yellow-red card) 90+2'; Marić (yellow card) 90+4'; Semedo (yellow card) 90+6'	Stadium: Alphamega Stadium; Referee: R. Baixinho (Portugal)

2 May 2026 32	Omonia	3–0	Aris Limassol	Nicosia
19:00 EEST (UTC+3)	Tanković 11'; Mmaee 22', 57'; Simić (yellow card) 70'; Semedo (yellow card) 75'	Report	Charalampous (yellow card) 64'	Stadium: GSP Stadium; Attendance: 19,525; Referee: A. Kyriakos

6 May 2026 33	Pafos	0–2	Omonia	Paphos
19:00 EEST (UTC+3)	Lelê (yellow card) 83'; Quina (yellow card) 87'	Report	Marić (yellow card) 30'; Odubajo (yellow card) 43'; Neofytou (yellow card) 62', (goal) 79'; Chatzigiovanis 85', (yellow card) 86'	Stadium: Stelios Kyriakides Stadium; Referee: F. Fourneau (Italy)

10 May 2026 34	Omonia	1–1	AEK Larnaca	Nicosia
18:00 EEST (UTC+3)	Simić (yellow card) 30'; Ewandro (yellow card) 32'; Coulibaly 76'	Report	Miličević 30' (pen.), (yellow card) 61'; Ledes (yellow card) 38'; Miramón (yellow card) 45+2'; Ivanović (red card) 60'	Stadium: GSP Stadium; Referee: K. Fellas

16 May 2026 35	APOEL	0–3	Omonia	Nicosia
18:00 EEST (UTC+3)	Nanu (yellow card) 52'	Report	Kousoulos 10', 17', (yellow card) 56'; Ewandro 71'; Chatzigiovanis (yellow card) 79'	Stadium: GSP Stadium; Referee: M. Christoforou

22 May 2026 36	Omonia	5–2	Apollon Limassol	Nicosia
17:30 EEST (UTC+3)	Simić 5'; Chatzigiovanis 55'; Ewandro 64'; Mmaee 76', 90'; Coulibaly (yellow card) 80'	Report	Marques 35'; Assunção (yellow card) 52', (goal) 72'; Kvída (yellow card) 66'; Lam (yellow card) 83'	Stadium: GSP Stadium; Attendance: 7,283; Referee: I. Christodoulou

=== Cypriot Cup ===
14 January 2026 Second round	Omonia	2–1	AEK Larnaca	Nicosia
18:00 EET (UTC+2)	Mmaee 10' (pen.); Tanković 26'	Report	Rubio 80'	Stadium: GSP Stadium

4 February 2026 Quarter-finals	Omonia	1–2 (a.e.t.)	AEL Limassol	Nicosia
19:00 EET (UTC+2)	Marić (yellow card) 34'; Ewandro (yellow card) 74'; Masouras (yellow card) 90+1'; Mmaee 90+8'	Report	Imanishimwe (yellow card) 36'; Zdravkovski (yellow card) 49'; Glavčić (yellow card) 69'; Bogdan (yellow card) 73'; Natel 77'; Szöke (yellow card) 90+6'; Maseko 115'	Stadium: GSP Stadium

=== UEFA Conference League ===
==== Qualifying ====
===== Second qualifying round =====
24 July 2025 First leg	Omonia (Cyprus)	1–0	(Georgia (country)) Torpedo Kutaisi	Nicosia, Cyprus
20:00 EEST (UTC+3)	Jovetić 20'; Semedo (yellow card) 49'	Report	Bidzinashvili (yellow card) 89'; Andrić (yellow card) 90+1'	Stadium: GSP Stadium; Attendance: 8,714; Referee: Lukas Fähndrich (Switzerland); Assistant referees: Guillaume Maire (Switzerland), Nicolas Müller (Switzerland); Fourth official: Mirel Turkes (Switzerland)

31 July 2025 Second leg	Torpedo Kutaisi (Georgia (country))	0–4 (0–5 agg.)	(Cyprus) Omonia	Kutaisi, Georgia
21:00 GET (UTC+4)	Šimić (yellow card) 29'; Bidzinashvili (yellow card) 55'	Report	Jovetić 30', 63'; Semedo 47', 78'; Masouras (yellow card) 67'	Stadium: Ramaz Shengelia Stadium; Attendance: 10,083; Referee: Mikkel Redder (Denmark); Assistant referees: Deniz Yurdakul (Denmark), René Risum (Denmark); Fourth official: Jens Maae (Denmark)
Note: Omonia won 5–0 on aggregate.

===== Third qualifying round =====
7 August 2025 First leg	Araz-Naxçıvan (Azerbaijan)	0–4	(Cyprus) Omonia	Baku, Azerbaijan (Note: The match was played at the Dalga Arena in Baku, instead of their regular stadium, the Nakhchivan City Stadium, in Nakhchivan, which did not meet UEFA requirements.)
20:00 AZT (UTC+4)	Hasanalizade (yellow card) 63'; Andrade (yellow card) 66'; Keyta (yellow card) 76'	Report	Loizou 13', 22'; Ewandro 55'; Jovetić 58', (yellow card) 64'; Marić (yellow card) 69'	Stadium: Dalga Arena; Attendance: 4,200; Referee: Ondřej Berka (Czech Republic); Assistant referees: Ivo Nadvornik (Czech Republic), Jan Váňa (Czech Republic); Fourth official: Ondrej Pechanec (Czech Republic)

14 August 2025 Second leg	Omonia (Cyprus)	5–0 (9–0 agg.)	(Azerbaijan) Araz-Naxçıvan	Nicosia, Cyprus
20:00 EEST (UTC+3)	Semedo 9'; Jovetić 23'; Ewandro 30', 45+4'; Kousoulos (yellow card) 71'; Musiałowski 79'	Report	Wanderson (yellow card) 57'	Stadium: GSP Stadium; Attendance: 6,523; Referee: Jakob Kehlet (Denmark); Assistant referees: Lars Hummelgaard (Denmark), Martin Markus (Denmark); Fourth official: Mikkel Redder (Denmark)
Note: Omonia won 9–0 on aggregate.

==== Play-off round ====
21 August 2025 First leg	Wolfsberger AC (Austria)	2–1	(Cyprus) Omonia	Klagenfurt, Austria (Note: The match was played at the Wörthersee Stadion, in Klagenfurt, instead of their regular stadium, the Lavanttal-Arena, in Wolfsberg, which did not meet UEFA requirements.)
19:00 CEST (UTC+2)	Nwaiwu (yellow card) 18', (goal) 30'; Nastl (yellow card) 35' (not on pitch); Zukić 88', (yellow card) 90'	Report	Kitsos (yellow card) 9'; Coulibaly 16'; Berg (yellow card) 66' (not on pitch); González (red card) 88' (not on pitch); Panagiotou (yellow card) 90+1'	Stadium: Wörthersee Stadion; Attendance: 3,154; Referee: António Nobre (Portugal); Assistant referees: Pedro Ribeiro (Portugal), Nelson Pereira (Portugal); Fourth official: Ricardo Baixinho (Portugal)

28 August 2025 Second leg	Omonia (Cyprus)	1–0 (a.e.t.) (2–2 agg.) (5–4 p)	(Austria) Wolfsberger AC	Nicosia, Cyprus
19:00 EEST (UTC+3)	Semedo 39'; Marić (red card) 60'; Ewandro (yellow card) 90+2'	Report	Schöpf (yellow card) 66'; Wimmer (yellow card) 86'; Baumgartner (yellow card) 87'	Stadium: GSP Stadium; Attendance: 14,582; Referee: Daniele Chiffi (Italy); Assistant referees: Giorgio Peretti (Italy), Davide Moro (Italy); Fourth official: Luca Zufferli (Italy)
	Penalties
	Stępiński (penalty scored); Coulibaly (penalty scored); Eraković (penalty scored); Chatzigiovanis (penalty scored); Kousoulos (penalty scored)		(penalty scored) Zukić; (penalty scored) Schöpf; (penalty missed) Pink; (penalty scored) Baumgartner; (penalty scored) Gattermayer
Note: 2–2 on aggregate. Omonia won 5–4 on penalties.

==== League phase ====
Pos	Team	Pld	W	D	L	GF	GA	GD	Pts	Qualification
16	(Croatian Football Federation) Rijeka	6	2	3	1	5	2	+3	9	Advance to knockout phase play-offs (seeded)
17	(Polish Football Association) Jagiellonia Białystok	6	2	3	1	5	4	+1	9	Advance to knockout phase play-offs (unseeded)
18	(Cyprus Football Association) Omonia	6	2	2	2	5	4	+1	8	Advance to knockout phase play-offs (unseeded)
19	(Football Federation of Armenia) Noah	6	2	2	2	6	7	−1	8	Advance to knockout phase play-offs (unseeded)
20	(Football Federation of Kosovo) Drita	6	2	2	2	4	8	−4	8	Advance to knockout phase play-offs (unseeded)

Source: UEFA
Rules for classification: League phase tiebreakers

===== Results by round =====
Round	1	2	3	4	5	6
Ground	H	A	A	H	A	H
Result	L	D	D	W	W	L
Position	23	26	29	21	15	18
Points	0	1	2	5	8	8

Source: Worldfootball
A = Away; H = Home; W = Win; D = Draw; L = Loss

===== Matches =====
2 October 2025 1	Omonia (Cyprus)	0–1	(Germany) Mainz 05	Nicosia, Cyprus
19:45 EEST (UTC+3)	Agouzoul (yellow card) 74'	Report	Nordin (yellow card) 49'; Amiri 75' (pen.)	Stadium: GSP Stadium; Attendance: 12,548; Referee: Miloš Milanović (Serbia); Assistant referees: Milan Pašajlić (Serbia), Novak Novaković (Serbia); Fourth official: Milan Ilić (Serbia)

23 October 2025 2	Drita (Kosovo)	1–1	(Cyprus) Omonia	Pristina, Kosovo (Note: The match was played at the Fadil Vokrri Stadium in Pristina, instead of their regular stadium, the Gjilan City Stadium, in Gjilan, due to renovation works.)
18:45 CEST (UTC+2)	Manaj 12'; Be. Krasniqi (yellow card) 41'; Soumahoro (yellow card) 43'; Sheji (yellow card) 70'	Report	Coulibaly (yellow card) 22'; Masouras 45+1'; E. Andreou (yellow card) 56'; Kousoulos (yellow card) 75'; Marić (yellow card) 88'	Stadium: Fadil Vokrri Stadium; Attendance: 2,250; Referee: Rob Harvey (Republic of Ireland); Assistant referees: Robert Clarke (Republic of Ireland), Wayne McDonnell (Republic of Ireland); Fourth official: Paul McLaughlin (Republic of Ireland)

6 November 2025 3	Lausanne-Sport (Switzerland)	1–1	(Cyprus) Omonia	Lausanne, Switzerland
21:00 CET (UTC+1)	Sow (yellow card) 31'; Bair 40'; Custodio (yellow card) 90+3', (penalty missed) 90+9'	Report	Neophytou 34'; Berg (yellow card) 90+4' (not on pitch); Šimić (yellow card) 90+6'; Kyriakidis (yellow card) 90+8'; Khammas (yellow card) 90+9'	Stadium: Stade de la Tuilière; Attendance: 9,873; Referee: Edgars Maļcevs (Latvia); Assistant referees: Mārtiņš Svipsts (Latvia), Deniss Ševcenko (Latvia); Fourth official: Aleksandrs Anufrijevs (Latvia)

27 November 2025 4	Omonia (Cyprus)	2–0	(Ukraine) Dynamo Kyiv	Nicosia, Cyprus
19:45 EET (UTC+2)	Marić (yellow card) 4'; Semedo 34' (pen.); Neophytou 59'; Uzoho (yellow card) 75'	Report	Popov (yellow card) 33'; Mykhaylenko (yellow card) 45+1'; Kabayev (yellow card) 45+2'; Thiaré (yellow card) 57'; Guerrero (yellow card) 79'	Stadium: GSP Stadium; Attendance: 8,979; Referee: Radoslav Gidzhenov (Bulgaria); Assistant referees: Miroslav Maksimov (Bulgaria), Petar Mitrev (Bulgaria); Fourth official: Volen Chinkov (Bulgaria)

11 December 2025 5	Rapid Wien (Austria)	0–1	(Cyprus) Omonia	Vienna, Austria
21:00 CET (UTC+1)	Seidl (yellow card) 18'; Demir (yellow card) 29'	Report	Ewandro (yellow card) 16'; Neophytou 19'; Uzoho (yellow card) 58'	Stadium: Allianz Stadion; Attendance: 17,714; Referee: Joey Kooij (Netherlands); Assistant referees: Dyon Fikkert (Netherlands), Murat Kücükerbir (Netherlands); Fourth official: Jannick Van Der Laan (Netherlands)

18 December 2025 6	Omonia (Cyprus)	0–1	(Poland) Raków Częstochowa	Nicosia, Cyprus
22:00 EET (UTC+2)	Diounkou (yellow card) 16'; Simić (yellow card) 19'; Marić (yellow card) 70'; Kousoulos (yellow card) 86'	Report	Diaby-Fadiga (yellow card) 5'; Repka 49'; Papszun (yellow card) 79' (not on pitch)	Stadium: GSP Stadium; Attendance: 10,327; Referee: Sandro Schärer (Switzerland); Assistant referees: Jonas Erni (Switzerland), Tuberosa Nicolas (Switzerland); Fourth official: Johannes von Mandach (Switzerland)

==== Knockout phase ====
===== Knockout phase play-offs =====
19 February 2026 First leg	Omonia (Cyprus)	0–1	(Croatia) Rijeka	Nicosia, Cyprus
22:00 EET (UTC+2)	P. Andreou (yellow card) 37'; Christou (yellow card) 49'; Berg (yellow card) 67' (not on pitch); Semedo (yellow card) 84'; Masouras (yellow card) 87'	Report	Ndockyt (yellow card) 39'; Barišić (yellow card) 54'; Morchiladze (yellow card) 79' (yellow-red card) 89'; Adu-Adjei 86'	Stadium: GSP Stadium; Attendance: 8,990; Referee: Juxhin Xhaja (Albania); Assistant referees: Arber Zalla, Rejdi Avdo; Fourth official: Olsion Yzeiraj

26 February 2026 Second leg	Rijeka (Croatia)	3–1 (4–1 agg.)	(Cyprus) Omonia	Rijeka, Croatia
18:45 CET (UTC+1)	Barco (yellow card) 43'; Fruk 52', 67'; Adu-Adjei 79'	Report	Tanković 13'; Ewandro (yellow card) 25'; Odubajo (yellow card) 41'; Balkovec (yellow card) 56'; Masouras (yellow card) 90+2'	Stadium: Stadion Rujevica; Attendance: 6,965; Referee: Mykola Balakin (Ukraine); Assistant referees: Oleksandr Berkut (Ukraine), Viktor Matyash (Ukraine); Fourth official: Vitaliy Romanov (Ukraine)
Note: Rijeka won 4–1 on aggregate.
