= 2023–24 AC Omonia season =

AC Omonia
2023–24 season
- President: Stavros Papastavrou
- Head coach: Sofronis Avgousti
- Stadium: GSP Stadium
- Cypriot First Division: 3rd
- Cypriot Cup: Runners-up
- UEFA Europa Conference League: Second qualifying round

The 2023–24 season was Omonia's 69th season in the Cypriot First Division and 74th year in existence as a football club. The season covered the period from 1 July 2023 to 30 June 2024.

== Kits ==
- Supplier: Macron
- Sponsor:: Giantheart.gr

Home	Away

== Management team ==
=== Coaching staff ===
As of 11 July 2023

Position	Name
Sport Director	(Sweden) Jesper Jansson
Head of Scouting	(Cyprus) Simos Tarapoulouzis
Head coach	(Cyprus) Sofronis Avgousti
Assistant coaches	(Cyprus) Marios Nicolaou, (Spain) Miguel Bedoya
Physical fitness coaches	(Cyprus) Savvas Lithraggomitis, (Cyprus) Giorgos Georgiou, (Cyprus) Ioakeim Ioakeim
Goalkeeping coach	(Cyprus) Andreas Lougrides
Performance Analyst	(Cyprus) Athanasios Aggeli
Football Analyst	(Cyprus) Kyriakos Panagiotou

=== Team Staff ===
As of 11 July 2023

Position	Name
Team Manager	(Cyprus) Isavella Panaretou
Team Officer	(Cyprus) Takis Kofteros
Doctor	(Cyprus) Andreas Petrou
Physiotherapists	(Cyprus) Evaggelos Nicolaou, (Cyprus) Marios Paraskeva, (Cyprus) Costas Piponas
Chiropractor	(Cyprus) Giorgos Oxinos
Nutritionist	(Cyprus) Elina Grigoriou
Masseur	(Cyprus) Nicolai Temelkov
Scouters	(Germany) Rainer Rauffmann, (Cyprus) Nicolas Theodosiou
Plant Administrator	(Cyprus) Andreas Papastavrou
CaregiverS	(Cyprus) Giorgos Karagiannis, (Cyprus) Giorgos Hadjievaggelou, (Cyprus) Giorgos Hadjievaggelou

Source: omonoiafc.com.cy

== Players ==
=== Current squad ===
No.	Player	Nationality	Position (s)	Date of Birth (Age)	Signed	Previous club	Contract until
Goalkeepers
1	Constantinos Panagi	(Cyprus)	GK	8 October 1994 (age 31)	2014	(Cyprus) Olympiakos Nicosia	2026
23	Francis Uzoho	(Nigeria)	GK	28 October 1998 (age 27)	2021	(Cyprus) APOEL	2024
40	Fabiano	(Brazil)	GK	29 February 1988 (age 38)	2019	(Portugal) Porto	2024
98	Charalambos Kyriakides	(Cyprus)	GK	30 November 1998 (age 27)	2019	(Cyprus) Aris Limassol	2026
Defenders
2	Paris Psaltis	(Cyprus)	RB	13 January 1996 (age 30)	2021	(Cyprus) Olympiakos Nicosia	2024
3	Adam Matthews	(Wales)	RB	12 November 1992 (age 33)	2022	(Cyprus) Olympiakos Nicosia	2024
5	Senou Coulibaly	(Mali)	CB	4 September 1994 (age 31)	2023	(France) Dijon	2025
6	Marquinhos Cipriano	(Brazil)	LB	27 March 1999 (age 27)	2023	(Brazil) Avaí	2025
17	Jan Lecjaks	(Czech Republic)	LB	9 August 1990 (age 35)	2019	(Croatia) Dinamo Zagreb	2024
22	Ádám Lang	(Hungary)	CB	17 January 1993 (age 33)	2019	(Romania) CFR Cluj	2025
30	Nikolas Panayiotou	(Cyprus)	CB	12 May 2000 (age 26)	2019	(Cyprus) Anorthosis Famagusta	2025
73	Nemanja Miletić	(Serbia)	CB	16 January 1991 (age 35)	2022	(Serbia) Partizan	2024
82	Nikolas Kyriakides	(Cyprus)	CB	20 September 2004 (age 21)	2022	(Cyprus) Youth Sector	2025
Midfielders
8	Moreto Cassamá	(Guinea-Bissau)	MF	16 February 1998 (age 28)	2022	(France) Reims	2025
19	Fouad Bachirou	(Comoros)	DM / MF	15 April 1990 (age 36)	2021	(England) Nottingham Forest	2024
24	Novica Eraković	(Montenegro)	DM / MF	12 November 1999 (age 26)	2023	(Montenegro) Sutjeska	2026
31	Ioannis Kousoulos (c)	(Cyprus)	DM / MF	14 June 1996 (age 29)	2018	(Cyprus) Nea Salamina	2024
76	Charalampos Charalampous	(Cyprus)	MF	4 April 2002 (age 24)	2019	(Cyprus) Youth Sector	2026
90	Roman Bezus	(Ukraine)	AM	26 September 1990 (age 35)	2022	(Belgium) Gent	2024
Forwards
7	Willy Semedo	(Cape Verde)	RW	27 April 1994 (age 32)	2023	(Saudi Arabia) Al Faisaly	2026
9	Andronikos Kakoullis	(Cyprus)	CF	3 May 2001 (age 25)	2018	(Cyprus) Youth Sector	2026
10	Loizos Loizou	(Cyprus)	RW	18 August 2003 (age 22)	2019	(Cyprus) Youth Sector	2026
18	Karim Ansarifard	(Iran)	CF	3 April 1990 (age 36)	2022	(Greece) AEK Athens	2024
20	Panagiotis Zachariou	(Cyprus)	LW	26 February 1996 (age 30)	2021	(Cyprus) Olympiakos Nicosia	2025
21	Veljko Simić	(Serbia)	LW	17 February 1995 (age 31)	2023	(Serbia) Vojvodina	2025

== Transfers ==
=== In ===
Squad #	Pos.	Player	From	Fee	Date	Ref.
5	CB	(Mali) Senou Coulibaly	(France) Dijon	Free Transfer	5 July 2023	
6	LB	(Brazil) Marquinhos Cipriano	(Brazil) Avaí	Free Transfer	1 July 2023	
7	RW	(Cape Verde) Willy Semedo	(Saudi Arabia) Al Faisaly	Free Transfer	1 July 2023	
21	LW	(Serbia) Veljko Simić	(Serbia) Vojvodina	Free Transfer	17 July 2023	
24	MF	(Montenegro) Novica Eraković	(Montenegro) Sutjeska	Free Transfer	1 July 2023	

=== Out ===
Squad #	Pos.	Player	Transferred To	Fee	Date	Ref.
6	CB	(Spain) Héctor Yuste	Free agent	End of contract	30 June 2023	
13	AM	(Cyprus) Fotis Papoulis	Retired	End of contract	30 June 2023	
14	GK	(Greece) Fotis Kitsos	(Greece) Olympiacos	End of loan	30 June 2023	
28	LW	(Libya) Ismael Tajouri-Shradi	(United States) Minnesota United	Free Transfer	30 June 2023	
41	ST	(Ukraine) Artem Besedin	(Ukraine) Dynamo Kyiv	End of loan	30 June 2023	
42	MF	(United States) Mix Diskerud	Free Agent	End of contract	30 June 2023	

== Pre-season and friendlies ==
7 July 2023 Friendly	Górnik Łęczna	0–0	AC Omonia	Kielce
18:00 EEST (UTC+3)		Report		Stadium: Stadion Sportowy Nowiny Koło Kielc
Note: 90-minute match

11 July 2023 Friendly	AC Omonia	1–1	AS Trenčín	Kielce
18:30 EEST (UTC+3)	Semedo 11'	Report	Soares 31'	Stadium: Venue Stadion Korona
Note: 90-minute match

== Competitions ==
=== Overview ===
Competition	First match	Last match	Starting round	Final position	Record							
Competition	First match	Last match	Starting round	Final position	Pld	W	D	L	GF	GA	GD	Win %
Cyta Championship	21 August 2023	11 May 2024	Matchday 1	3rd	36	20	9	7	62	37	+25	55.56
Cypriot Cup	18 January 2024	18 May 2024	Second round	Runners-up	5	3	1	1	9	4	+5	60.00
Cypriot Super Cup	21 July 2023	21 July 2023	Finals	Runners-up	1	0	0	1	0	2	−2	0.00
UEFA Europa Conference League	27 July 2023	17 August 2023	Second qualifying round	Third qualifying round	4	3	0	1	9	8	+1	75.00
Total					46	26	10	10	80	51	+29	56.52

Last updated: 18 May 2024
Source: Competitions

=== Cyta Championship ===
==== Regular season ====
===== League table =====
Pos	Team	Pld	W	D	L	GF	GA	GD	Pts	Qualification or relegation
3	AEK Larnaca	26	15	7	4	44	26	+18	52	Qualification for the Championship round
4	Pafos	26	15	5	6	48	20	+28	50	Qualification for the Championship round
5	Omonia	26	14	7	5	49	30	+19	49	Qualification for the Championship round
6	Anorthosis Famagusta	26	14	5	7	38	23	+15	47	Qualification for the Championship round
7	Apollon Limassol	26	10	8	8	37	27	+10	38	Qualification for the Relegation round

Source: Soccerway
Rules for classification: 1) Points; 2) Head-to-head points; 3) Head-to-head goal difference; 4) Head-to-head goals scored; 5) Head-to-head away goals scored (only if two teams); 6) Goal difference; 7) Goals scored; 8) Play-off (only if deciding championship round, relegation round or relegation).

==== Championship round ====
Pos	Team	Pld	W	D	L	GF	GA	GD	Pts	Qualification
1	APOEL (C)	36	22	7	7	63	24	+39	73 (Note: Head to head points: APOEL 8, AEK 2.)	Qualification for the Champions League second qualifying round
2	AEK Larnaca	36	21	10	5	57	31	+26	73	Qualification for the Conference League second qualifying round
3	Omonia	36	20	9	7	62	37	+25	69	Qualification for the Conference League second qualifying round
4	Aris Limassol	36	20	5	11	63	34	+29	65	
5	Pafos	36	18	8	10	60	33	+27	62	Qualification for the Europa League first qualifying round (Note: Pafos qualified for the Europa League first qualifying round by winning the 2023–24 Cypriot Cup.)

Source: Soccerway
Rules for classification: 1) Points; 2) Head-to-head points; 3) Head-to-head goal difference; 4) Head-to-head goals scored; 5) Head-to-head away goals scored (only if two teams); 6) Goal difference; 7) Goals scored; 8) Play-off (only if deciding championship round, relegation round or relegation).
(C) Champions

=== Cypriot Football Cup ===
18 January 2024 Second round	Omonia	3–0	Ypsonas	Strovolos
18:00 EET (UTC+2)	Kakoullis 24'; Lecjaks 26'; Khalek 48' (o.g.)			Stadium: GSP Stadium; Attendance: 2,865

28 February 2024 Quarter-finals	Omonia	3–1	AEZ Zakakiou	Strovolos
18:00 EET (UTC+2)	Semedo 26'; Stępiński 30', 41'		Diguiny 90' (pen.)	Stadium: GSP Stadium; Referee: Marios Christoforou

10 April 2024 Semi-finals – First leg	Aris Limassol	0–3	Omonia	Kolossi
19:00 EEST (UTC+3)	Caju (red card) 42'; Bengtsson (yellow card) 52'; Brown (yellow card) 63'; Nikolić (yellow card) 76'; Sané (yellow card) 90+4'		Bezus 29'; Semedo 50'; Panagiotou (yellow card) 82'; Alioum 90'	Stadium: Limassol Stadium; Attendance: 2,000; Referee: Andrea Colombo

17 April 2024 Semi-finals – Second leg	Omonia	0–0 (3–0 agg.)	Aris Limassol	Strovolos
18:00 EEST (UTC+3)	Uzoho (yellow card) 80'; Kousoulos (yellow card) 85'		Matysik (yellow card) 41'; Urošević (yellow card) 48'	Stadium: GSP Stadium; Attendance: 11,511; Referee: Lukas Fähndrich

18 May 2024 Final	Omonia	0–3	Pafos	Strovolos
17:00 EEST (UTC+3)	Coulibaly (yellow card) 7' (yellow-red card) 87'		Tanković 8' (pen.); Dragomir 36'; Pêpê 40'; Jairo (yellow card) 76'; Dimitriou (yellow card) 90+2'	Stadium: GSP Stadium; Attendance: 14,000; Referee: Srđan Jovanović (Serbia)

=== Cypriot Super Cup ===
21 July 2023 Final	Aris Limassol	2–0	Omonia	Kolossi
17:30 EEST (UTC+3)	Mayambela 21' (yellow card) 45+1'; Špoljarić (yellow card) 41'; Stępiński 90+2'		Cassamá (yellow card) 26'; Semedo (yellow card) 38'	Stadium: Limassol Stadium

=== UEFA Europa Conference League ===
==== Second qualifying round ====
27 July 2023 First leg	Gabala (Azerbaijan)	2–3	(Cyprus) Omonia	Qabala, Azerbaijan
20:00 AZT (UTC+4)	Allach 4', 62' (yellow card) 86'; Musayev (yellow card) 80'	Report	Coulibaly (yellow card) 24'; Bezus 45+1', 50', 82' (pen.) (yellow card) 57'; Kakoullis (yellow card) 87'; Semedo (yellow card) 90+3'	Stadium: Gabala City Stadium; Attendance: 1,957; Referee: Andrei Chivulete (Romania)

3 August 2023 Second leg	Omonia (Cyprus)	4–1 (7–3 agg.)	(Azerbaijan) Gabala	Nicosia
20:00 EEST (UTC+3)	Bezus 5', 30' (pen.); Lang 38'; Semedo 59'	Report	Atangana (yellow card) 29'; Safarov (yellow card) 40'; Isaiah 56'	Stadium: GSP Stadium; Referee: Adam Ladebäck (Sweden)

==== Third qualifying round ====
10 August 2023 First leg	Omonia (Cyprus)	1–0	(Denmark) Midtjylland	Nicosia
20:00 EEST (UTC+3)	Bezus 38'	Report	Cho Gue-sung (yellow card) 60'	Stadium: GSP Stadium; Attendance: 14,571; Referee: Sigurd Smehus Kringstad (Norway)

17 August 2023 Second leg	Midtjylland (Denmark)	5–1 (5–2 agg.)	(Cyprus) Omonia	Herning, Denmark
19:45 CEST (UTC+2)	Cho Gue-sung 27' (pen); Şimşir (yellow card) 34'; Djú 43' (Olsson) 45+3' (Paulinho) 64' (Kaba); Olsson (yellow card) 52'; Martínez (yellow card) 77'; Gigović 80' (Fossum)	Report	Matthews (yellow card) 17'; Kousoulos (red card) 24'; Bachirou (yellow card) 25'; Kakoullis 31'; Bezus (yellow card) 34'; Ansarifard (yellow card) 76'; Simić (yellow card) 90+2'	Stadium: MCH Arena; Attendance: 7,008; Referee: Ian McNabb (Northern Ireland)

== Statistics ==
=== Squad statistics ===
As of 17 July 2023

No.	Pos	Player	League		Play-offs		Cup		Total	
No.	Pos	Player	Apps	Goals	Apps	Goals	Apps	Goals	Apps	Goals
Goalkeepers
1	GK	(Cyprus) Constantinos Panagi	0	0	0	0	0	0	0	0
23	GK	(Nigeria) Francis Uzoho	0	0	0	0	0	0	0	0
40	GK	(Brazil) Fabiano	0	0	0	0	0	0	0	0
98	GK	(Cyprus) Charalambos Kyriakides	0	0	0	0	0	0	0	0
Defenders
2	DF	(Cyprus) Paris Psaltis	0	0	0	0	0	0	0	0
3	DF	(Wales) Adam Matthews	0	0	0	0	0	0	0	0
5	DF	(Mali) Senou Coulibaly	0	0	0	0	0	0	0	0
6	DF	(Brazil) Marquinhos Cipriano	0	0	0	0	0	0	0	0
17	DF	(Czech Republic) Jan Lecjaks	0	0	0	0	0	0	0	0
22	DF	(Hungary) Ádám Lang	0	0	0	0	0	0	0	0
30	DF	(Cyprus) Nikolas Panayiotou	0	0	0	0	0	0	0	0
73	DF	(Serbia) Nemanja Miletić	0	0	0	0	0	0	0	0
82	DF	(Cyprus) Nikolas Kyriakides	0	0	0	0	0	0	0	0
Midfielders
8	MF	(Guinea-Bissau) Moreto Cassamá	0	0	0	0	0	0	0	0
19	MF	(Comoros) Fouad Bachirou	0	0	0	0	0	0	0	0
24	MF	(Montenegro) Novica Eraković	0	0	0	0	0	0	0	0
31	MF	(Cyprus) Ioannis Kousoulos	0	0	0	0	0	0	0	0
76	MF	(Cyprus) Charalampos Charalampous	0	0	0	0	0	0	0	0
90	MF	(Ukraine) Roman Bezus	0	0	0	0	0	0	0	0
Forwards
7	FW	(Cape Verde) Willy Semedo	0	0	0	0	0	0	0	0
9	FW	(Cyprus) Andronikos Kakoullis	0	0	0	0	0	0	0	0
10	FW	(Cyprus) Loizos Loizou	0	0	0	0	0	0	0	0
18	FW	(Iran) Karim Ansarifard	0	0	0	0	0	0	0	0
20	FW	(Cyprus) Panagiotis Zachariou	0	0	0	0	0	0	0	0
21	FW	(Serbia) Veljko Simić	0	0	0	0	0	0	0	0
