= Nikolas Panagiotou =

Cypriot footballer (born 2000)

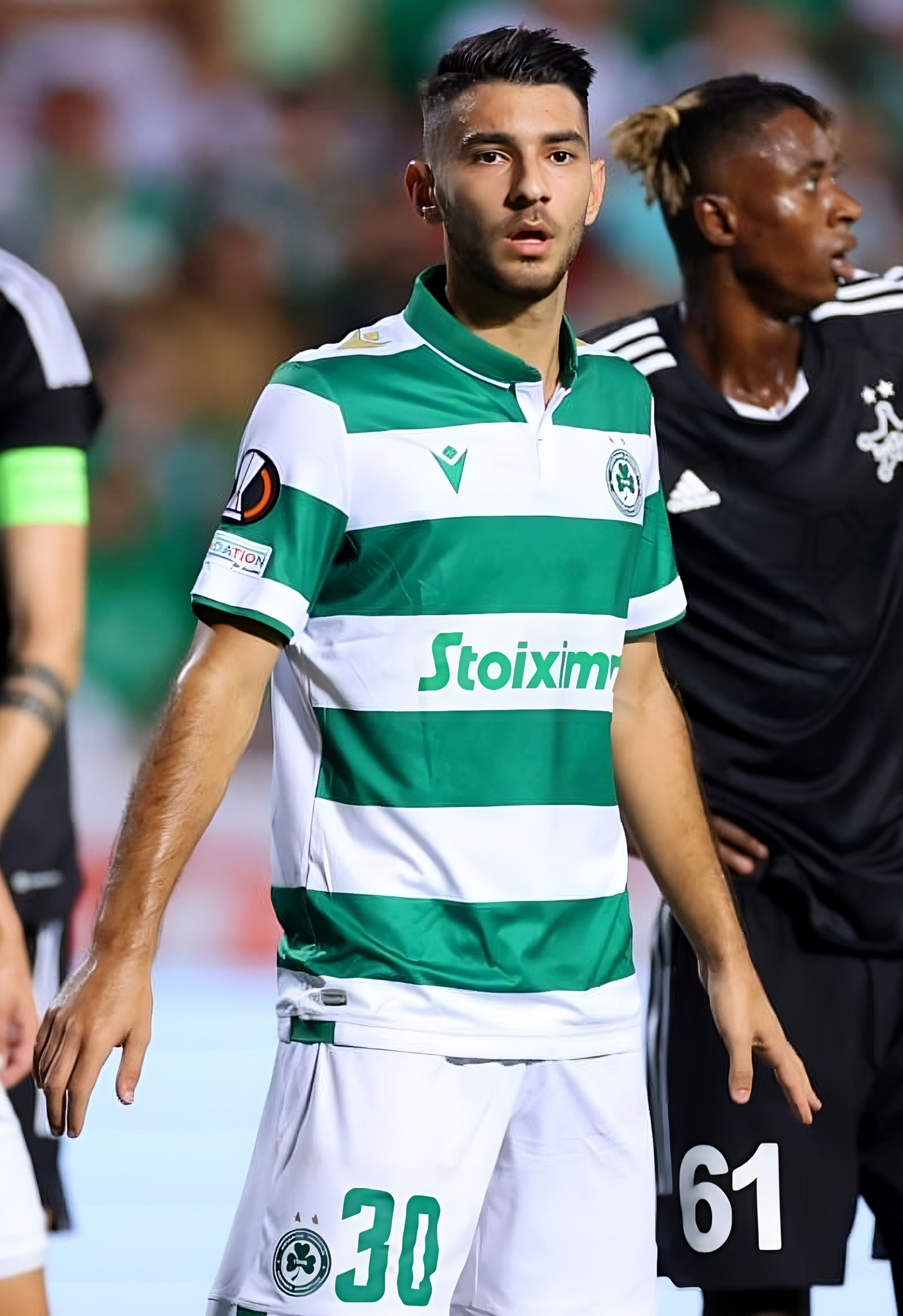

Personal information
- Date of birth: 12 May 2000 (age 26)
- Place of birth: Nicosia, Cyprus
- Height: 1.83 m (6 ft 0 in)
- Positions: Defender; defensive midfielder

Team information
- Current team: Utrecht
- Number: 5

Youth career
- 2012-2018: Anorthosis

Senior career*
Years	Team	Apps	(Gls)
2018–2019	Anorthosis	3	(0)
2019–2026	Omonia	123	(5)
2026–	Utrecht	9	(0)

International career^{‡}
2018–2019	Cyprus U19	16	(1)
2019–2021	Cyprus U21	8	(0)
2021–	Cyprus	25	(0)
- * Club domestic league appearances and goals as of 22 November 2026 ‡ National team caps and goals as of 18:50, 5 October 2026 (UTC)

Nikolas Panagiotou (alternative transliteration Nikolas Panayiotou, Greek: Νικόλας Παναγιώτου; born 12 May 2000) is a Cypriot professional footballer who plays as a centre-back for Dutch Eredivisie club Utrecht and the Cyprus national team.

== Club career ==
Having come through Anorthosis' academy, Panagiotou was promoted to their first team in April 2019. In July of the same year, he joined Omonia on a three-year contract, which he would later renew until 2027.

On 6 October 2022, Panagiotou scored his first goal for Omonia, in a 2–3 home defeat to Manchester United, in the Europa League. This made him Omonia's 101st player to score in a European competition, setting a new record for a Cypriot club's number of European scorers.

Panagiotou helped his team win the 2022–23 Cypriot Cup, having started every game in the competition from the second leg of the quarter finals onwards.

On 2 September 2026, Panagiotou signed a three-year contract with Utrecht in the Netherlands, with an option to extend.

== International career ==
He made his debut for the Cyprus national team on 1 September 2021 in a World Cup qualifier against Malta, a 0–3 away loss. He substituted Omonia teammate Fotis Papoulis in the 59th minute.

== Career statistics ==
=== Club ===
As of match played 22 November 2026

Appearances and goals by club, season and competition
Club	Season	League			Cup		Continental		Other		Total	
Club	Season	Division	Apps	Goals	Apps	Goals	Apps	Goals	Apps	Goals	Apps	Goals
Anorthosis	2018–19	Cypriot First Division	3	0	—		—		—		3	0
Omonia	2019–20	Cypriot First Division	0	0	—		—		—		0	0
Omonia	2020–21	Cypriot First Division	5	0	1	0	—		—		6	0
Omonia	2021–22	Cypriot First Division	21	0	4	0	9 (Note: Four appearances in UEFA Europa League, five appearances in UEFA Europa Conference League)	0	—		34	0
Omonia	2022–23	Cypriot First Division	15	1	4	0	7 (Note: Appearances in UEFA Europa League)	1	—		26	2
Omonia	2023–24	Cypriot First Division	29	1	5	0	—		—		34	1
Omonia	2024–25	Cypriot First Division	26	0	1	0	10 (Note: Appearances in UEFA Conference League)	0	—		37	0
Omonia	2025–26	Cypriot First Division	26	3	2	0	8	0	—		36	3
Omonia	2026–27	Cypriot First Division	1	0	—		6	1	—		7	1
Omonia	Total		123	5	17	0	40	2	0	0	180	7
Utrecht	2026–27	Eredivisie	9	0	1	1	—		—		10	1
Career total			135	5	18	1	40	2	0	0	193	8

=== International ===
As of match played 5 October 2026

Appearances and goals by national team and year
National team	Year	Apps	Goals
Cyprus
Cyprus	2021	3	0
Cyprus	2022	7	0
Cyprus	2023	0	0
Cyprus	2024	5	0
Cyprus	2025	4	0
Cyprus	2026	6	0
Total		25	0

== Honours ==
Omonia

- Cypriot First Division: 2020–21, 2025–26
- Cypriot Cup: 2021–22, 2022–23
- Cypriot Super Cup: 2021

Individual

- Cypriot First Division PASP Team of the Year: 2023–24
