= Eraković =

Eraković is a surname. Notable people with the surname include:

- Marina Erakovic (born 1988), Croatian New Zealand tennis player
- Novica Eraković (born 1999), Montenegrin footballer
- Strahinja Eraković (born 2001), Serbian football player
