= Alpha Diounkou =

Senegalese footballer (born 2001)

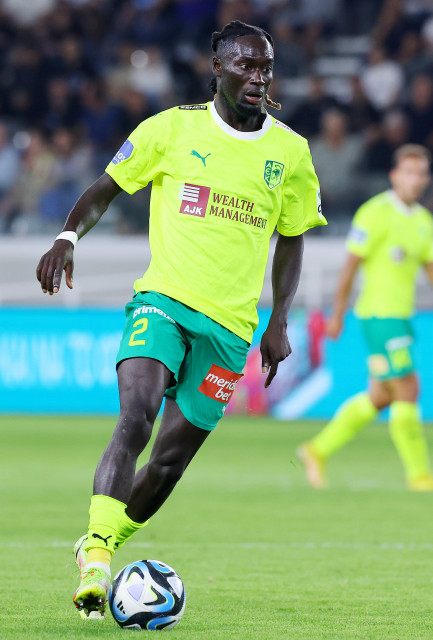
- Diounkou with AEK Larnaca in 2023

Personal information
- Full name: Alpha Richard Diounkou Tecagne
- Date of birth: 10 October 2001 (age 25)
- Place of birth: Sindone, Senegal
- Height: 1.83 m (6 ft 0 in)
- Position: Right-back

Team information
- Current team: Celje
- Number: 20

Youth career
- 2007–2015: Son Cladera
- 2015–2016: Mallorca
- 2016–2021: Manchester City

Senior career*
Years	Team	Apps	(Gls)
2021–2024	Granada	0	(0)
2021–2022	→ San Fernando (loan)	13	(0)
2022–2023	→ Barcelona B (loan)	39	(0)
2023–2024	→ AEK Larnaca (loan)	31	(0)
2024–2026	Omonia	55	(0)
2026–	Celje	1	(0)

International career
2018	Spain U17	4	(0)
2019	Senegal U20	5	(0)
- * Club domestic league appearances and goals as of 14 June 2026

Alpha Richard Diounkou Tecagne (born 10 October 2001) is a Senegalese professional footballer who plays as a right-back for Slovenian PrvaLiga club Celje.

== Club career ==
Diounkou began playing football with the youth academy of Son Cladera at the age of six, before moving to Mallorca's youth academy at the age of 14. He moved to Manchester City's youth academy in January 2016. He worked his way up their reserves, before transferring to Granada on 31 August 2021. He joined San Fernando on loan for the first half of the 2021–22 season. On 31 January 2022, he joined Barcelona B for the remainder of the season.

On 1 September 2023, Diounkou was loaned to Cypriot First Division side AEK Larnaca, for one year. On 1 July 2024, he moved permanently to another Cypriot club, Omonia Nicosia.

== International career ==
Diounkou was born in Senegal and moved to Spain at a young age. He represented the Spain U17s at the 2018 UEFA European Under-17 Championship. He switched to represent the Senegal U20s at the 2019 FIFA U-20 World Cup. Diounkou was called up to the senior Senegal national team in May 2022 for 2023 Africa Cup of Nations qualification matches.

== Career statistics ==
As of 29 June 2025

Appearances and goals by club, season and competition
Club	Season	League			National cup (Note: Includes Cypriot Cup)		Europe		Other		Total	
Club	Season	Division	Apps	Goals	Apps	Goals	Apps	Goals	Apps	Goals	Apps	Goals
San Fernando (loan)	2021–22	Segunda División	13	0	0	0	—		—		14	0
Barcelona B (loan)	2021–22	Segunda División	16	0	—		—		—		16	0
Barcelona B (loan)	2022–23	Segunda División	23	0	—		—		—		23	0
Barcelona B (loan)	Total		39	0	0	0	0	0	0	0	39	0
AEK Larnaca (loan)	2023–24	Cypriot First Division	31	0	2	0	—		—		33	0
Omonia	2024–25	Cypriot First Division	30	0	2	0	14 (Note: Appearances in UEFA Conference League)	0	—		46	0
Career total			113	0	5	0	14	0	0	0	132	0

== Honours ==
Omonia

- Cypriot First Division: 2025–26
