= Konstantinos Panagi =

Cypriot footballer

Personal information
- Full name: Konstantinos Panagi
- Date of birth: 8 October 1994 (age 32)
- Place of birth: Nicosia, Cyprus
- Height: 1.88 m (6 ft 2 in)
- Position: Goalkeeper

Team information
- Current team: Anorthosis Famagusta
- Number: 1

Youth career
- 2005-2010: Olympiakos Nicosia

Senior career*
Years	Team	Apps	(Gls)
2010–2014	Olympiakos Nicosia	27	(0)
2014–2024	Omonia	85	(0)
2023–2024	→ Ethnikos Achna (loan)	23	(0)
2025	Enosis Neon Paralimni	1	(0)
2025–	Anorthosis	17	(0)

International career^{‡}
2010	Cyprus U17	3	(0)
2011–2013	Cyprus U19	12	(0)
2013–2016	Cyprus U21	8	(0)
2016–	Cyprus	28	(0)
- * Club domestic league appearances and goals as of 09:06, 18 October 2026 (UTC) ‡ National team caps and goals as of 01 February 2024

Konstantinos Panagi (Greek: Κωνσταντίνος Παναγή; born 8 October 1994) is a Cypriot professional footballer who plays as a goalkeeper for Anorthosis Famagusta and the Cyprus national team.

== Club career ==
Panagi is a product of Olympiakos Nicosia academies and in 2010 he was promoted to the men's team by coach Pambos Christodoulou. In 2013-2014 he was the main choice under the goalposts of Olympiakos making 25 league appearances in the Cypriot Second Division. On 20 May 2014 he transferred to another team of the capital Omonia. He made his first team debut on 18 April in a draw with Apollon where he impressed and he is since being always a first team regular for Omonia. His European debut came on the 9th of June in a 2–0 win against Dinamo Batumi.

== Career statistics ==
=== Club ===
As of match played 16 October 2026

Club	Season	League			Cup		Continental		Other		Total	
Club	Season	Division	Apps	Goals	Apps	Goals	Apps	Goals	Apps	Goals	Apps	Goals
Olympiakos Nicosia	2010–11	Cypriot First Division	2	0	0	0	—		—		2	0
Olympiakos Nicosia	2011–12	Cypriot First Division	1	0	1	0	—		—		1	0
Olympiakos Nicosia	2012–13	Cypriot First Division	1	0	0	0	—		—		1	0
Olympiakos Nicosia	2013–14	Cypriot Second Division	23	0	1	0	—		—		24	0
Olympiakos Nicosia	Total		27	0	2	0	—		—		29	0
Omonia	2014–15	Cypriot First Division	7	0	2	0	0	0	—		9	0
Omonia	2015–16	Cypriot First Division	31	0	0	0	5	0	—		36	0
Omonia	2016–17	Cypriot First Division	29	0	0	0	4	0	—		33	0
Omonia	2017–18	Cypriot First Division	5	0	0	0	—		—		5	0
Omonia	2018–19	Cypriot First Division	5	0	1	0	—		—		6	0
Omonia	2019–20	Cypriot First Division	0	0	0	0	—		—		0	0
Omonia	2020–21	Cypriot First Division	3	0	0	0	0	0	—		3	0
Omonia	2021–22	Cypriot First Division	2	0	1	0	0	0	—		3	0
Omonia	2022–23	Cypriot First Division	3	0	0	0	0	0	—		3	0
Omonia	Total		85	0	4	0	9	0	0	0	98	0
Ethnikos Achna (loan)	2023–24	Cypriot First Division	23	0	0	0	—		—		23	0
Enosis Neon Paralimni	2024–25	Cypriot First Division	1	0	0	0	—		—		1	0
Anorthosis	2025–26	Cypriot First Division	16	0	0	0	—		—		16	0
Anorthosis	2026–27	Cypriot First Division	1	0	0	0	—		—		1	0
Career Total			153	0	6	0	9	0	0	0	168	0

=== International ===
As of match played 28 March 2023.

Cyprus national team
Year	Apps	Goals
2016	5	0
2017	7	0
2018	5	0
2019	5	0
2021	1	0
2022	3	0
2023	2	0
Total	28	0

== Honours ==
Omonia

- Cypriot First Division: 2020–21
- Cypriot Cup: 2021–22, 2022–23
- Cypriot Super Cup: 2021
