= Charalampos Kyriakidis =

Cypriot footballer (born 1998)

Personal information
- Full name: Charalampos Kyriakidis
- Date of birth: 30 November 1998 (age 27)
- Place of birth: Nicosia, Cyprus
- Height: 1.95 m (6 ft 5 in)
- Position: Goalkeeper

Team information
- Current team: Pafos
- Number: 98

Youth career
- Akritas Chlorakas

Senior career*
| Years | Team | Apps | (Gls) |
| 2015–2018 | Pafos | 0 | (0) |
| 2018–2019 | Aris Limassol | 0 | (0) |
| 2019–2026 | Omonia | 10 | (0) |
| 2022–2023 | → Omonia Aradippou (loan) | 11 | (0) |
| 2026– | Pafos | 0 | (0) |

International career^{‡}
| 2020– | Cyprus | 5 | (0) |
- * Club domestic league appearances and goals as of 11:15, 2 June 2026 (UTC) ‡ National team caps and goals as of 13:00, 7 June 2026 (UTC)

Charalampos Kyriakidis (Greek: Χαράλαμπος Κυριακίδης; born 30 November 1998) is a Cypriot professional footballer who plays as a goalkeeper for Pafos.

== Honours ==
Omonia

- Cypriot First Division: 2020–21, 2025–26
- Cypriot Cup: 2021–22, 2022–23
- Cypriot Super Cup: 2021

Pafos

- Cypriot Super Cup: 2026
