= Mariusz Stępiński =

Polish footballer

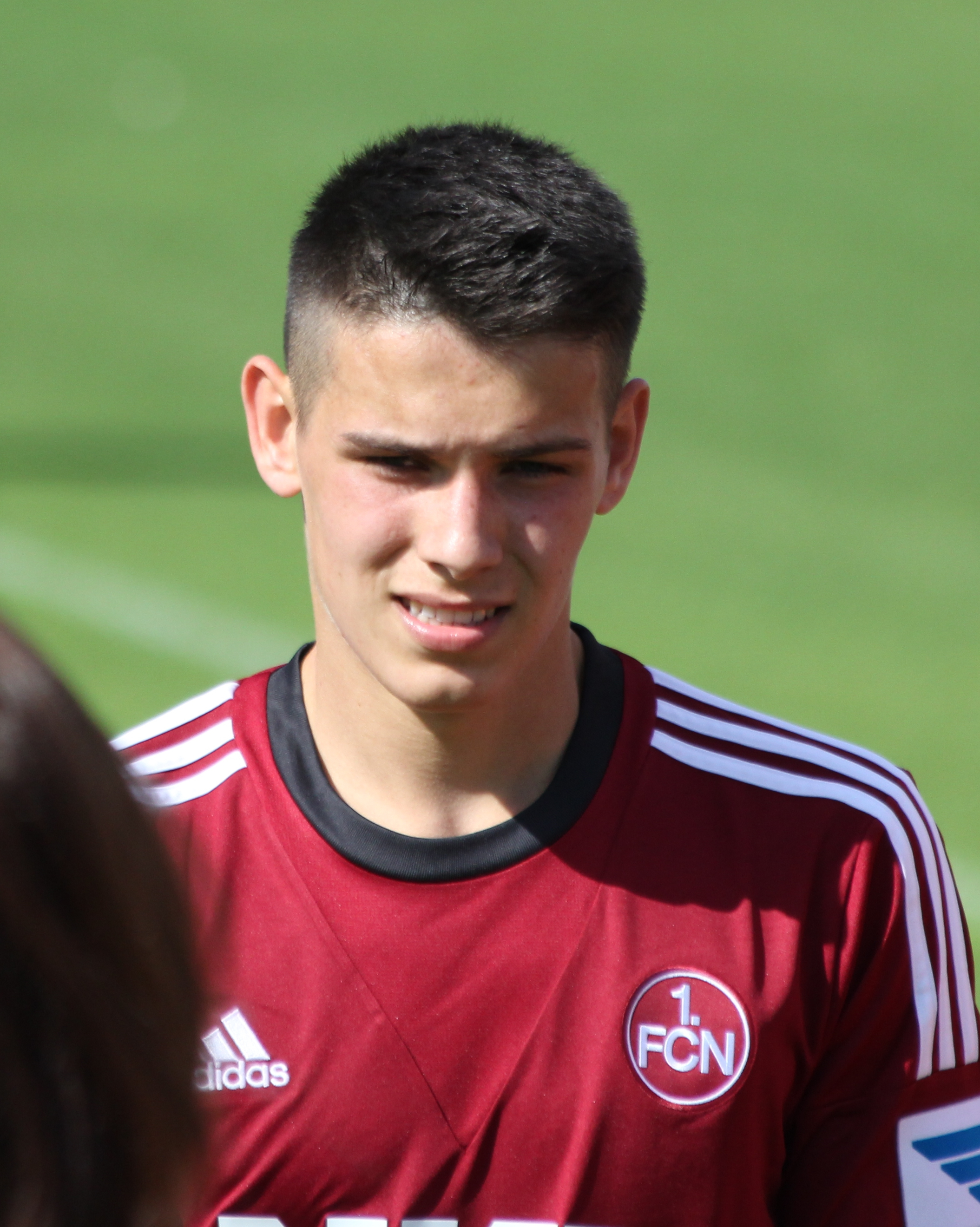
- Stępiński as a Nürnberg player in 2013

Personal information
- Full name: Mariusz Paweł Stępiński
- Date of birth: 12 May 1995 (age 31)
- Place of birth: Sieradz, Poland
- Height: 1.83 m (6 ft 0 in)
- Position: Striker

Team information
- Current team: Korona Kielce
- Number: 14

Youth career
- Piast Błaszki
- 2009–2011: Pogoń-Ekolog Zduńska Wola

Senior career*
| Years | Team | Apps | (Gls) |
| 2011–2013 | Widzew Łódź | 33 | (5) |
| 2013–2015 | Nürnberg | 0 | (0) |
| 2014–2015 | → Wisła Kraków (loan) | 25 | (2) |
| 2015–2016 | Ruch Chorzów | 39 | (18) |
| 2016–2018 | Nantes | 22 | (4) |
| 2017–2018 | → Chievo (loan) | 22 | (5) |
| 2018–2020 | Chievo | 36 | (6) |
| 2019–2020 | → Verona (loan) | 21 | (3) |
| 2020–2022 | Verona | 0 | (0) |
| 2020–2021 | → Lecce (loan) | 32 | (9) |
| 2021–2022 | → Aris Limassol (loan) | 24 | (9) |
| 2022–2024 | Aris Limassol | 45 | (7) |
| 2024–2026 | Omonia | 44 | (16) |
| 2026– | Korona Kielce | 24 | (10) |

International career
| 2009 | Poland U15 | 10 | (6) |
| 2010–2011 | Poland U16 | 8 | (10) |
| 2011–2012 | Poland U17 | 15 | (9) |
| 2012–2013 | Poland U19 | 8 | (3) |
| 2013–2015 | Poland U20 | 8 | (3) |
| 2013–2017 | Poland U21 | 18 | (8) |
| 2013–2017 | Poland | 4 | (0) |
- * Club domestic league appearances and goals as of 11:06, 20 September 2026 (UTC)

Mariusz Paweł Stępiński (Polish pronunciation: [ˈmarjuʂ stɛmˈpiɲski]; born 12 May 1995) is a Polish professional footballer who plays as a striker for and captains Ekstraklasa club Korona Kielce.

== Club career ==
=== Early career ===
Born in Sieradz, Poland, Stępiński started his career playing for youth sides Piast Błaszki and Pogoń-Ekolog Zduńska Wola. In 2011, he signed for Ekstraklasa club Widzew Łódź, going on to make 33 appearances and scoring five goals over two seasons.

=== 1. FC Nürnberg ===
On 5 June 2013, Stępiński signed for German Bundesliga club 1. FC Nürnberg on a three-year contract.

=== Nantes ===
In 2016, Stępinski signed for FC Nantes in the French Ligue 1.

=== Chievo ===
On 31 August 2017, he was loaned to Italian side Chievo.

=== Hellas Verona ===
On 2 September 2019, he signed for Verona. The deal is a loan from Chievo with obligation to buy at the end of the loan.

=== Lecce ===
In October 2020, he signed for Lecce with an option to buy.

=== Aris Limassol ===
On 6 August 2021, he was loaned to Cypriot side Aris Limassol with an option to buy at the end of the season. He made his debut on 22 August 2021, where he played for 65 minutes. On 31 August 2022, Stępiński returned to Aris on a permanent basis. He helped the team win their first ever domestic championship.

=== Omonia ===
In the 2024 January transfer window, Stępinski moved to Omonia for an undisclosed fee.

=== Korona Kielce ===
After over eight years of playing abroad, Stępiński returned to Poland and joined Ekstraklasa club Korona Kielce on 23 December 2025, signing a half-year deal with a two-year extension option. On his return to Polish football, he scored both goals for Korona in a 2–1 away win over Legia Warsaw on 31 January 2026. His extension option was triggered by Korona on 31 May 2026.

== International career ==
Stępiński represented Poland at various youth levels. He made his first senior appearance on 2 February 2013 in an international friendly against Romania. Poland won 4–1, with Stępiński being subbed on in the 84th minute.

He also played at the 2012 UEFA European Under-17 Football Championship.

He was selected as part of the senior squad for the UEFA Euro 2016.

== Career statistics ==
=== Club ===
As of match played 23 May 2026

Appearances and goals by club, season and competition
| Club | Season | League | | | National cup (Note: Includes Polish Cup, Coupe de France, Coppa Italia, Cypriot Cup) | | Europe | | Other | | Total | |
| Club | Season | Division | Apps | Goals | Apps | Goals | Apps | Goals | Apps | Goals | Apps | Goals |
|---|---|---|---|---|---|---|---|---|---|---|---|---|
| Widzew Łódź | 2011–12 | Ekstraklasa | 8 | 0 | 0 | 0 | — | | — | | 8 | 0 |
| Widzew Łódź | 2012–13 | Ekstraklasa | 25 | 5 | 1 | 0 | — | | — | | 26 | 5 |
| Widzew Łódź | Total | | 33 | 5 | 1 | 0 | — | | — | | 34 | 5 |
| Wisła Kraków (loan) | 2014–15 | Ekstraklasa | 25 | 2 | 1 | 0 | — | | — | | 26 | 2 |
| Ruch Chorzów | 2015–16 | Ekstraklasa | 34 | 15 | 2 | 0 | — | | — | | 36 | 15 |
| Ruch Chorzów | 2016–17 | Ekstraklasa | 5 | 3 | 1 | 0 | — | | — | | 6 | 3 |
| Ruch Chorzów | Total | | 39 | 18 | 3 | 0 | — | | — | | 42 | 18 |
| Nantes | 2016–17 | Ligue 1 | 21 | 4 | 2 | 2 | — | | 2 (Note: Appearances in Coupe de la Ligue) | 1 | 25 | 7 |
| Nantes | 2017–18 | Ligue 1 | 1 | 0 | 0 | 0 | — | | 0 | 0 | 1 | 0 |
| Nantes | Total | | 22 | 4 | 2 | 2 | — | | 2 | 1 | 26 | 7 |
| Chievo (loan) | 2017–18 | Serie A | 22 | 5 | 1 | 0 | — | | — | | 23 | 5 |
| Chievo | 2018–19 | Serie A | 35 | 6 | 2 | 0 | — | | — | | 37 | 6 |
| Chievo | 2019–20 | Serie B | 1 | 0 | 2 | 0 | — | | — | | 3 | 0 |
| Chievo | Total | | 58 | 11 | 5 | 0 | — | | — | | 63 | 11 |
| Verona (loan) | 2019–20 | Serie A | 21 | 3 | 0 | 0 | — | | — | | 21 | 3 |
| Lecce (loan) | 2020–21 | Serie B | 32 | 9 | 1 | 1 | — | | — | | 33 | 10 |
| Aris Limassol (loan) | 2021–22 | Cypriot First Division | 24 | 9 | 1 | 0 | — | | — | | 25 | 9 |
| Aris Limassol | 2022–23 | Cypriot First Division | 29 | 4 | 1 | 1 | — | | — | | 30 | 5 |
| Aris Limassol | 2023–24 | Cypriot First Division | 16 | 3 | 0 | 0 | 12 (Note: Four appearances and two goals in UEFA Champions League, eight appearances in UEFA Europa League) | 2 | 1 (Note: Appearance in Cypriot Super Cup) | 1 | 29 | 6 |
| Aris Limassol | Total | | 69 | 16 | 2 | 1 | 12 | 2 | 1 | 1 | 84 | 20 |
| Omonia | 2023–24 | Cypriot First Division | 13 | 4 | 4 | 2 | — | | — | | 17 | 6 |
| Omonia | 2024–25 | Cypriot First Division | 27 | 12 | 2 | 1 | 11 (Note: Appearances in UEFA Conference League) | 4 | — | | 40 | 17 |
| Omonia | 2025–26 | Cypriot First Division | 4 | 0 | 0 | 0 | 5 | 0 | — | | 9 | 0 |
| Omonia | Total | | 44 | 16 | 6 | 3 | 16 | 4 | 0 | 0 | 66 | 23 |
| Korona Kielce | 2025–26 | Ekstraklasa | 15 | 4 | — | | — | | — | | 15 | 4 |
| Career total | | | 357 | 88 | 21 | 7 | 28 | 6 | 3 | 2 | 409 | 103 |

=== International ===
Appearances and goals by national team and year
| National team | Year | Apps | Goals |
|---|---|---|---|
| Poland | 2013 | 1 | 0 |
| Poland | 2015 | 1 | 0 |
| Poland | 2016 | 1 | 0 |
| Poland | 2017 | 1 | 0 |
| Total | | 4 | 0 |

== Honours ==
Aris Limassol

- Cypriot First Division: 2022–23
- Cypriot Super Cup: 2023

Poland U21

- Four Nations Tournament: 2014–15
