= Fotis Kitsos =

Greek footballer (born 2003)

Personal information
- Full name: Fotios Kitsos
- Date of birth: 31 March 2003 (age 23)
- Place of birth: Athens, Greece
- Height: 1.74 m (5 ft 9 in)
- Position: Left-back

Team information
- Current team: Omonia
- Number: 3

Youth career
- 2012–2021: Olympiacos

Senior career*
Years	Team	Apps	(Gls)
2021–2022	Olympiacos B	20	(1)
2022–2024	Olympiacos	5	(0)
2022–2023	→ Omonia (loan)	25	(0)
2023–2024	→ Volos (loan)	19	(0)
2024–	Omonia	31	(0)

International career
2019–2020	Greece U17	7	(1)
2021	Greece U19	4	(1)
2022–2024	Greece U21	15	(0)
- * Club domestic league appearances and goals as of 14 June 2026

Fotis Kitsos (Greek: Φώτης Κίτσος; born 31 March 2003) is a Greek professional footballer who plays as a left-back for Omonia.

== Career ==
At age 18, Kitsos was promoted from Olympiacos's youth team by first-team manager Pedro Martins, who was impressed with his speed and good technique. He made his debut in Super League, as a member of the first team, as a late substitute in a 3–1 home win game against Panetolikos.

He was loaned to Cypriot club Omonia for the duration of the 2022–23 season, helping the club win their 16th Cypriot Cup. He spent the 2023–24 season on loan at Volos. On 13 August 2024, he returned to Omonia, this time on a permanent deal.

== Career statistics ==
As of 5 June 2023

Appearances and goals by club, season and competition
Club	Season	League			National cup (Note: Includes Greek Cup, Cypriot Cup)		Continental		Other		Total	
Club	Season	Division	Apps	Goals	Apps	Goals	Apps	Goals	Apps	Goals	Apps	Goals
Olympiacos B	2021–22	Super League Greece 2	19	1	—		—		—		19	1
Olympiacos	2021–22	Super League Greece	5	0	3	0	—		—		8	0
Omonia (loan)	2022–23	Cypriot First Division	25	0	4	0	3 (Note: Appearances in UEFA Europa League)	0	—		32	0
Career total			49	1	7	0	3	0	0	0	59	1

== Honours ==
Olympiacos

- Super League Greece: 2021–22

Omonia

- Cypriot First Division: 2025–26
- Cypriot Cup: 2022–23
