= Panagiotis Andreou =

Cypriot footballer (born 2004)

Personal information
- Date of birth: 29 April 2006 (age 20)
- Place of birth: Kalo Chorio Oreinis, Cyprus
- Height: 1.73 m (5 ft 8 in)
- Position: Midfielder

Team information
- Current team: Omonia
- Number: 74

Youth career
- 2011–2017: Lemasia Football Academy
- 2018: APOEL
- 2018–2023: Omonia

Senior career*
Years	Team	Apps	(Gls)
2023–	Omonia	34	(2)
2024–2025	→ Karmiotissa (loan)	17	(0)

International career^{‡}
2022	Cyprus U16	1	(0)
2022–2023	Cyprus U17	7	(1)
2024	Cyprus U18	2	(0)
2023–2024	Cyprus U19	8	(0)
2024–2025	Cyprus U21	11	(1)
2026–	Cyprus	6	(0)
- * Club domestic league appearances and goals as of 11 November 2026 ‡ National team caps and goals as of 12 November 2026

Panagiotis Andreou (Greek: Παναγιώτης Ανδρέου; born 29 April 2006) is a Cypriot professional footballer who plays as a midfielder for Cypriot First Division club Omonia Nicosia and the Cyprus national team.

== Club career ==
Andreou began his youth career in Lemasia Football Academy, before leaving for APOEL in 2018, shortly after joining the academy of Omonia Nicosia, working closely with coach Kostas Konstantinou. Andreou signed his first professional contract with Omonia in February 2024, having already played for the first team in matches against AEK Larnaca and Apollon Limassol.

He signed for fellow Cypriot First Division team Karmiotissa FC on a season-long loan in September 2024. He made 17 appearances during his loan spell.

Following his return from his loan spell, Andreou began to establish himself further into the first-team, being included in the club's pre-season trip to Poland. He signed a contract extension with Omonia in February 2026, penning a deal running until 2029. Andreou scored his first goal for Omonia in March 2026, scoring in a 2–0 victory over Omonia Aradippou. Andreou made 20 league appearances during the 2025–26 season, as the club won the Cyprus League title.

Andreou became a crucial part of the Omonia side for the 2026-27 season as the team qualified for the 2026–27 UEFA Europa League group stage, including scoring a first leg goal in a 1-0 win against FC Kairat in the Champions League first qualifying round.

== International career ==
Andreou has represented Cyprus at several youth levels.

He received his first senior call-up for Cyprus in March 2026, for friendlies against Belarus and Moldova, making his debut against the former as a starter in a 1-0 defeat.

== Career statistics ==
=== Club ===
As of 11 November 2026

Club	Season	League			National Cup		Continental		Other		Total	
Club	Season	Division	Apps	Goals	Apps	Goals	Apps	Goals	Apps	Goals	Apps	Goals
Omonia	2022–23	Cypriot First Division	1	0	0	0	0	0	0	0	1	0
Omonia	2023–24	Cypriot First Division	3	0	0	0	0	0	0	0	3	0
Omonia	2024–25	Cypriot First Division	0	0	0	0	0	0	0	0	0	0
Omonia	2025–26	Cypriot First Division	21	2	2	0	4 (Note: Four appearances in UEFA Conference League)	0	0	0	27	2
Omonia	2026–27	Cypriot First Division	9	0	0	0	10 (Note: Two appearances in UEFA Champions League, five appearances in UEFA Europa League)	2	1 (Note: One appearance in Cypriot Super Cup)	0	20	2
Omonia	Total		34	2	2	0	14	2	1	0	51	4
Karmiotissa (loan)	2024–25	Cypriot First Division	17	0	1	0	0	0	0	0	18	0
Career total			51	2	3	0	14	2	1	0	69	4

=== International ===
As of match played 12 November 2026

National Team	Year	Apps	Goals
Cyprus	2026	6	0

== Honours ==
Omonia Nicosia

- Cypriot First Division: 2025–26

Individual

- Cyprus Football Association Young Player of the Year: 2025–26
