= Jan Lecjaks =

Czech footballer (born 1990)

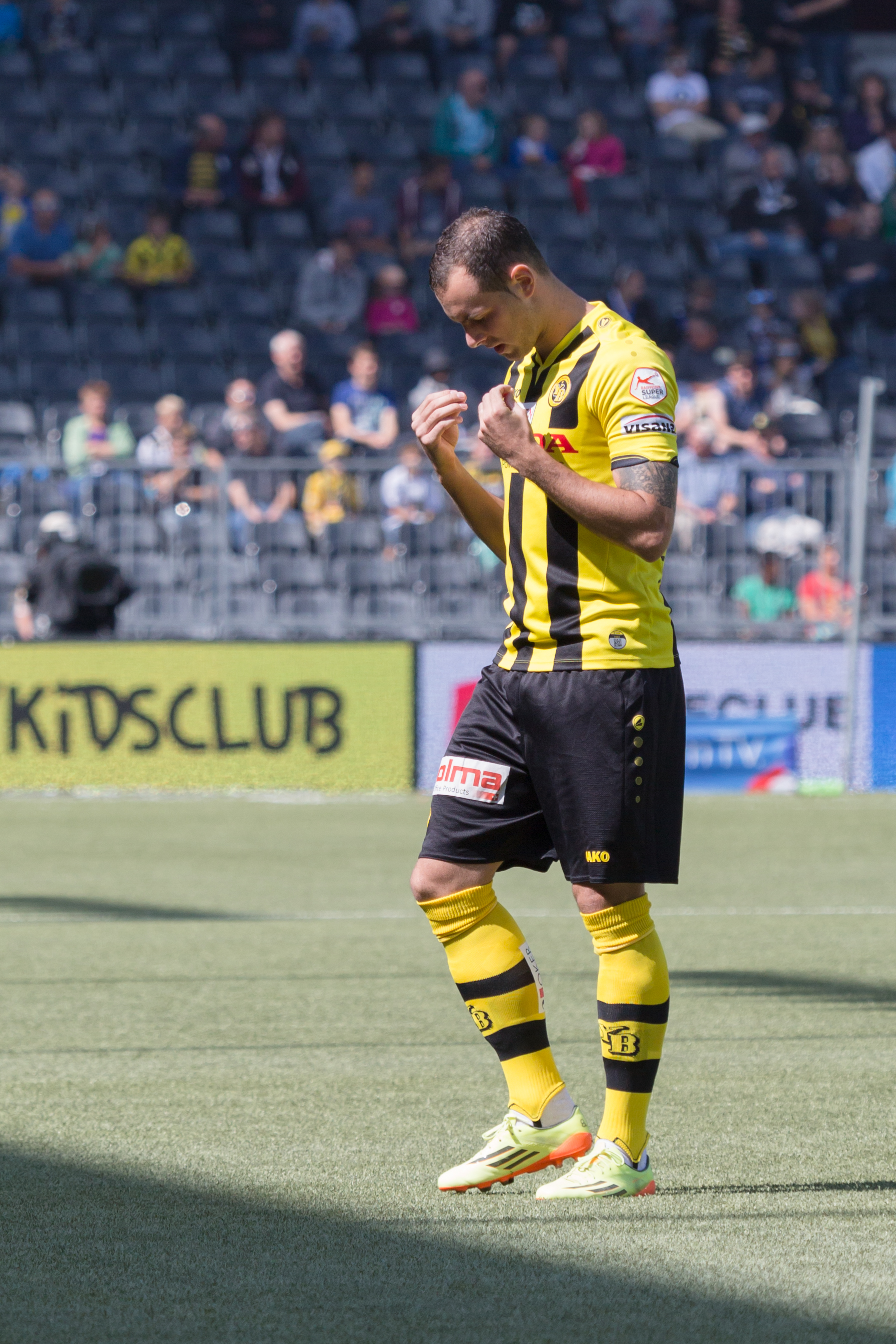
- Jan Lecjaks in 2014 before the kick-off of the BSC Young Boys game against FC Luzern

Personal information
- Full name: Jan Lecjaks
- Date of birth: 9 August 1990 (age 36)
- Place of birth: Plzeň, Czechoslovakia
- Height: 1.86 m (6 ft 1 in)
- Position: Left back

Team information
- Current team: Ormideia

Youth career
- 1996–2000: Sokol Štěnovice
- 2000–2006: Viktoria Plzeň

Senior career*
Years	Team	Apps	(Gls)
2006–2011	Viktoria Plzeň	59	(2)
2010–2011	→ Anderlecht (loan)	30	(0)
2011–2017	Young Boys	124	(4)
2013	→ Vålerenga (loan)	22	(2)
2017–2019	Dinamo Zagreb	22	(1)
2018–2019	→ Lokomotiva (loan)	29	(2)
2019–2024	Omonia	125	(6)
2024–2025	Nea Salamina	20	(0)
2025–	Ormideia	0	(0)

International career
2006–2007	Czech Republic U17	13	(2)
2007	Czech Republic U18	5	(1)
2007–2008	Czech Republic U19	13	(1)
2009	Czech Republic U20	3	(0)
2008–2012	Czech Republic U21	27	(1)
- * Club domestic league appearances and goals as of 18:25, 27 June 2025 (UTC)

Jan Lecjaks (born 9 August 1990) is a Czech footballer who plays as a left back for Cypriot Third Division club Ormideia.

== Club career ==
=== Viktoria Plzeň ===
Lecjaks began his career in 1996 playing for the youth team of Sokol Štěnovice and in 2000 he joined Viktoria Plzeň. In the 2007/2008 season, he made his professional debut for Viktoria Plzeň in the Czech First League on 11 November 2007 against Mladá Boleslav. He won the Czech Cup with Viktoria Plzeň in 2010.

On 10 June 2010 he went on loan to Anderlecht for a season. While at Anderlecht, on 18 August Lecjaks scored an own goal in a 2–2 away draw in a Champions League play-off round qualifier.

=== Young Boys ===
In July 2011 he signed for Swiss side Young Boys on a four-year contract. In April 2013 he signed a loan contract with Vålerenga out the 2013 season.

=== Dinamo Zagreb ===
On 24 June 2017, Lecjaks joined Croatian club Dinamo Zagreb on a three-year contract. On 19 November, he scored his first goal for the club in a 2–0 victory against Lokomotiva. In August 2018, he was loaned out to Lokomotiva.

=== Omonia ===
On 6 August 2019, Lecjaks joined Cypriot club Omonia on a two-year contract. A year later, he renewed his contract until 2022.

On 16 September 2020, he scored the decisive penalty in a Champions League qualifier against Red Star Belgrade, which guaranteed Omonia participation in the group stage of a European competition, for the first time in the club's history. On 22 October, he assisted the team's first goal at the group stage level, in a 1–1 away draw against PAOK. Lecjaks played an important role in Omonia winning the 2020–21 Cypriot First Division, finishing the season with 12 assists in the league, playing as a left back.

The 2021–22 season was also successful for Lecjaks, who scored his first four goals for the club and renewed his contract until 2024. He won the 2021 Super Cup and the 2021-22 Cypriot Cup with Omonia, although he missed the final due to injury. He made his 100th appearance for Omonia on 16 February 2022, in a 2–0 away win against Aris Limassol, in the Cypriot First Division.

=== Nea Salamis ===
On 30 May 2024, Lecjaks signed a one-year contract with Cypriot club Nea Salamis.

== International career ==
Lecjaks is former youth international for the Czech Republic. He played for the Czech Republic national under-20 football team at the 2009 FIFA U-20 World Cup in Egypt He is a member of the Czech under-21 team. He represented the team at the 2011 UEFA European Under-21 Football Championship.

== Career statistics ==
As of match played 27 May 2024

Appearances and goals by club, season and competition
Club	Season	League			National Cup		Continental		Other		Total	
Club	Season	Division	Apps	Goals	Apps	Goals	Apps	Goals	Apps	Goals	Apps	Goals
Viktoria Plzeň	2007–08	Fortuna Liga	18	0	0	0	—		—		18	0
Viktoria Plzeň	2008–09	Fortuna Liga	19	1	0	0	—		—		19	1
Viktoria Plzeň	2009–10	Fortuna Liga	22	1	0	0	—		—		22	1
Viktoria Plzeň	Total		59	2	0	0	—		—		59	2
Anderlecht (loan)	2010–11	Pro League	30	0	2	0	8	0	0	0	40	0
Young Boys	2011–12	Swiss Super League	15	1	2	0	0	0	—		17	1
Young Boys	2012–13	Swiss Super League	7	1	0	0	4	0	—		11	1
Young Boys	2013–14	Swiss Super League	9	0	0	0	—		—		9	0
Young Boys	2014–15	Swiss Super League	33	0	1	0	11	1	—		45	1
Young Boys	2015–16	Swiss Super League	29	1	1	0	3	0	—		33	1
Young Boys	2016–17	Swiss Super League	31	1	3	0	9	0	—		43	1
Young Boys	Total		124	4	7	0	27	1	—		158	5
Vålerenga (loan)	2013	Tippeligaen	22	2	4	0	—		—		26	2
Dinamo Zagreb	2017–18	Prva HNL	21	1	3	0	4	0	—		28	1
Dinamo Zagreb	2018–19	Prva HNL	1	0	0	0	0	0	—		1	0
Dinamo Zagreb	Total		22	1	3	0	4	0	—		29	1
Lokomotiva (loan)	2018–19	Prva HNL	29	2	2	0	—		—		31	2
Omonia	2019–20	Cypriot First Division	23	0	2	0	—		—		25	0
Omonia	2020–21	Cypriot First Division	30	0	2	0	11	0	—		43	0
Omonia	2021–22	Cypriot First Division	26	3	5	0	10	1	1	0	42	4
Omonia	2022–23	Cypriot First Division	30	2	4	0	6	0	1	0	41	2
Omonia	2023–24	Cypriot First Division	16	1	3	1	4	0	0	0	23	2
Omonia	Total		125	6	16	1	31	1	2	0	174	8
Career total			411	17	34	1	70	2	2	0	517	20

== Honours ==
=== Club ===
Viktoria Plzeň

- Czech Cup: 2009–10

Anderlecht

- Belgian Super Cup: 2010

Omonia

- Cypriot First Division: 2020–21
- Cypriot Cup: 2021–22, 2022–23
- Cypriot Super Cup: 2021

Individual

- Swiss Super League Team of the Year: 2016–17,
- Cypriot First Division Team of the Year: 2020–21
