= Ewandro =

Brazilian footballer (born 1996)

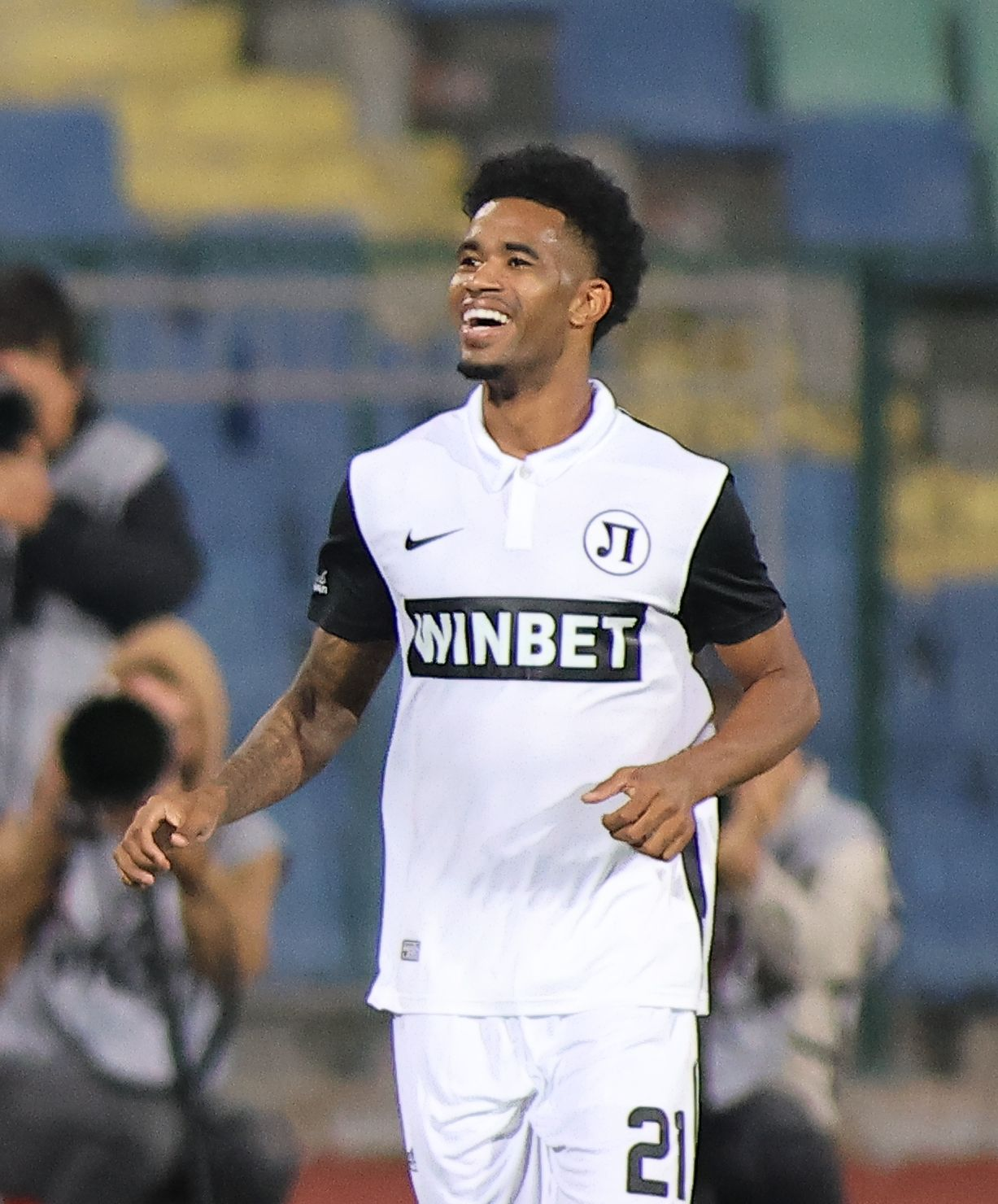
- Ewandro with Lokomotiv Plovdiv in 2022

Personal information
- Full name: Ewandro Felipe de Lima Costa
- Date of birth: 15 March 1996 (age 30)
- Place of birth: Recife, Brazil
- Height: 1.76 m (5 ft 9 in)
- Position: Attacking midfielder

Team information
- Current team: Omonia
- Number: 11

Youth career
- 2009–2014: São Paulo

Senior career*
Years	Team	Apps	(Gls)
2014–2016	São Paulo	22	(2)
2015–2016	→ Atlético Paranaense (loan)	36	(8)
2016–2021	Udinese	6	(0)
2018	→ Estoril (loan)	15	(1)
2018–2019	→ Austria Wien (loan)	8	(1)
2019	→ Fluminense (loan)	4	(0)
2020	→ Sport (loan)	11	(1)
2020–2021	→ Vitória (loan)	15	(1)
2021	CRB	28	(3)
2022	Náutico	26	(3)
2022–2024	Lokomotiv Plovdiv	42	(6)
2023–2024	→ Spartak Varna (loan)	15	(5)
2024–	Omonia	61	(13)

International career
2013	Brazil U17	6	(1)
2014–2015	Brazil U20	3	(3)
- * Club domestic league appearances and goals as of 10 October 2026

Ewandro Felipe de Lima Costa (born 15 March 1996), known as Ewandro, is a Brazilian professional footballer who plays as an attacking midfielder for Cypriot First Division club Omonia.

== Club career ==
=== São Paulo ===
Ewandro joined São Paulo in 2009. On 23 January 2014, he made his debut in a 4–0 victory against Mogi Mirim in a Campeonato Paulista tie, in which he replaced Luís Fabiano with six minutes remaining. A week later, Ewandro scored his first São Paulo goal in a 6–3 victory over Rio Claro, netting in the 81st minute with his first touch of the ball.

==== Atlético Paranaense (loan) ====
On 21 July 2015, Ewandro joined league rivals Atlético Paranaense on loan for the remainder of the 2015 season and the 2016 season. On 23 August 2015, Ewandro made his Atlético Paranaense debut in a 2–0 defeat against Internacional, in which he replaced Douglas Coutinho for the remaining twenty minutes. Ewandro scored his first Atlético Paranaense goal on 30 August 2015, in a 3–0 victory over Goiás.

On 1 May 2016, Ewandro scored his first goal of the 2016 campaign in a 3–0 victory against Coritiba, netting in the 65th minute to make it 2–0. Ewandro went on to make nineteen more appearances and score two more goals in all competitions over the 2016 campaign before joining Italian side Udinese.

=== Udinese ===
On 7 July 2016, Ewandro joined Serie A side Udinese on a five-year deal.

On 21 January 2018, Ewandro was loaned to Portuguese Primeira Liga side Estoril for the remainder of the season.

On 6 August 2018, Ewandro joined to Austrian Bundesliga side Austria Wien on loan.

In April 2019, he joined Fluminense on loan until the end of the season.

On 17 December 2019, Brazilian club Sport announced that Ewandro will join them on loan until 31 December 2020.

=== Lokomotiv Plovdiv ===
In July 2022, he relocated to Bulgaria, signing a contract with Lokomotiv Plovdiv.

=== Spartak Varna ===
In February 2023, Ewandro joined Spartak Varna.

== Career statistics ==
As of match played 13 May 2018

Appearances and goals by club, season and competition
Club	Season	League			National cup (Note: Includes Coppa Italia)		Continental		Other		Total	
Club	Season	Division	Apps	Goals	Apps	Goals	Apps	Goals	Apps	Goals	Apps	Goals
São Paulo	2014	Série A	4	0	0	0	1 (Note: Appearance(s) in Copa Sudamericana)	0	9 (Note: Appearance(s) in Campeonato Paulista)	1	14	1
São Paulo	2015	Série A	0	0	0	0	1 (Note: Appearance(s) in Copa Libertadores)	0	7	1	8	1
São Paulo	Total		4	0	0	0	2	0	16	2	22	2
Atlético Paranaense (loan)	2015	Série A	14	5	0	0	2	0	0	0	16	5
Atlético Paranaense (loan)	2016	Série A	9	1	1 (Note: Appearance(s) in Copa do Brasil)	0	0	0	10 (Note: Appearance(s) in Campeonato Paranaense)	2	20	3
Atlético Paranaense (loan)	Total		23	6	1	0	2	0	10	2	36	8
Udinese	2016–17	Serie A	5	0	0	0	—		—		5	0
Udinese	2017–18	Serie A	0	0	1	0	—		—		1	0
Udinese	Total		5	0	1	0	0	0	0	0	6	0
Estoril (loan)	2017–18	Primeira Liga	15	1	0	0	—		—		15	1
Career total			37	6	1	0	4	0	26	4	68	10

== Honours ==
Atlético Paranaense

- Campeonato Paranaense: 2016

Náutico

- Campeonato Pernambucano: 2022

Omonia

- Cypriot First Division: 2025–26
