= Sofronis Avgousti =

Cypriot footballer (born 1977)

Personal information
- Full name: Sofronis Avgousti
- Date of birth: 9 March 1977 (age 49)
- Place of birth: Limassol, Cyprus
- Height: 1.80 m (5 ft 11 in)
- Position: Goalkeeper

Team information
- Current team: Apollon Limassol (manager)

Senior career*
Years	Team	Apps	(Gls)
1998–2006	Apollon Limassol	127	(0)
2006–2008	AEK Larnaca	51	(0)
2008–2009	Apollon Limassol	4	(0)
2009	Aris Limassol	10	(0)
2010	APOEL	0	(0)
2010–2013	Apollon Limassol	4	(0)

International career
2004–2010	Cyprus	11	(0)

Managerial career
- 2016–2020: Apollon Limassol
- 2020–2021: AEK Larnaca
- 2021–2022: APOEL
- 2022–2023: Karmiotissa
- 2023–2024: Omonia
- 2024: Karmiotissa
- 2024: Cyprus
- 2024–2025: Apollon Limassol
- 2026–: Nea Salamis
- * Club domestic league appearances and goals

Sofronis Avgousti (Greek: Σωφρόνης Αυγουστή; born 9 March 1977) is a Cypriot football manager and former player who was most recently the manager of the Apollon Limassol.

Playing as a goalkeeper, he spent much of his career at Apollon Limassol, and he was capped 11 times for the Cypriot national team. As a manager, he has won the Cypriot Cup with both Apollon (2017) and Omonia (2023).

== Playing career ==
He started his career in 1998 with Apollon Limassol before joining AEK Larnaca in 2006. After another spell with Apollon in 2008–09, he split the 2009–10 season between Aris and APOEL. In May 2010, he returned to Apollon for a third spell and retired at the end of the 2012–13 season.

== Coaching career ==
After the departure of Pedro Emanuel from Apollon in December 2016, Sofronis Avgousti was assigned as caretaker manager for the remainder of the season. Due to the team's impressive form and performance, which resulted in the win of the Cypriot Cup, he stayed as a permanent solution for the managerial position at the club.

He left by mutual consent in November 2020 and, after AEK Larnaca dismissed their manager soon afterwards, Avgousti was appointed manager of that club on an 18-month contract. He and his staff left by mutual consent at the end of the 2020–21 season.

He was appointed manager of APOEL in August 2021 and, after a third place finish in the 2021–22 Cypriot First Division, he left by mutual consent in October 2022.

Following a brief stint at Karmiotissa, he became the new manager of 21-time Cypriot champions Omonia in February 2023, leading them to win the 2022–23 Cypriot Cup. His contract was terminated in January 2024, and he returned to Karmiotissa the following summer.

In October 2024, Avgousti was appointed manager of the Cyprus national team, but he resigned in December of the same year to assume the vacant manager position at Apollon Limassol.

== Managerial statistics ==
As of match played 18 November 2024

Managerial record by team and tenure
Team	Nat	From	To	Record								Ref
Team	Nat	From	To	G	W	D	L	GF	GA	GD	Win %	Ref
Apollon Limassol	(Cyprus)	11 December 2016	30 August 2019	145	85	29	31	294	140	+154	58.62	
Apollon Limassol	(Cyprus)	4 October 2019	12 November 2020	36	23	4	9	71	40	+31	63.89	
AEK Larnaca	(Cyprus)	24 November 2020	20 April 2021	24	9	4	11	27	29	−2	37.50	
APOEL	(Cyprus)	31 August 2021	4 October 2022	47	23	14	10	69	47	+22	48.94	
Karmiotissa Polemidion	(Cyprus)	14 December 2022	6 February 2023	8	2	2	4	7	8	−1	25.00	
Omonia	(Cyprus)	6 February 2023	January 2024	42	20	8	14	61	54	+7	47.62	
Cyprus	(Cyprus)	October 2024	present	4	1	0	3	3	11	−8	25.00	
Total				305	163	60	82	531	326	+205	53.44	—
