= Golden Gloves (disambiguation) =

Golden Gloves is the name given to annual competitions for amateur boxing in the United States.

Golden Glove or Golden Gloves may also refer to:

== Film ==
- Golden Gloves (1940 film), American crime film directed by Edward Dmytryk
- Golden Gloves (1961 film), Canadian documentary directed by Gilles Groulx

== Awards ==
=== Association football ===
- Golden Glove Award, FIFA competition award for best goalkeeper of tournament
  - FIFA World Cup Golden Glove
  - FIFA U-20 World Cup Golden Glove
  - FIFA U-17 World Cup Golden Glove
  - FIFA Women's World Cup Golden Glove
  - FIFA U-20 Women's World Cup Golden Glove
  - FIFA U-17 Women's World Cup Golden Glove
  - FIFA Club World Cup Golden Glove
  - FIFA Confederations Cup Golden Glove
- Premier League Golden Glove, an award for goalkeepers in the Premier League
- EFL Golden Glove, an award for goalkeepers in the English Football League

=== Baseball ===
- Mitsui Golden Glove Award, an award given to Nippon Professional Baseball players for outstanding defensive performance
- KBO League Golden Glove Award, award given to Korea Baseball Organization players for outstanding performance
- Gold Glove Award, award given to Major League Baseball players for outstanding defensive performance
