= Matej Šimić =

Croatian footballer (born 1995)

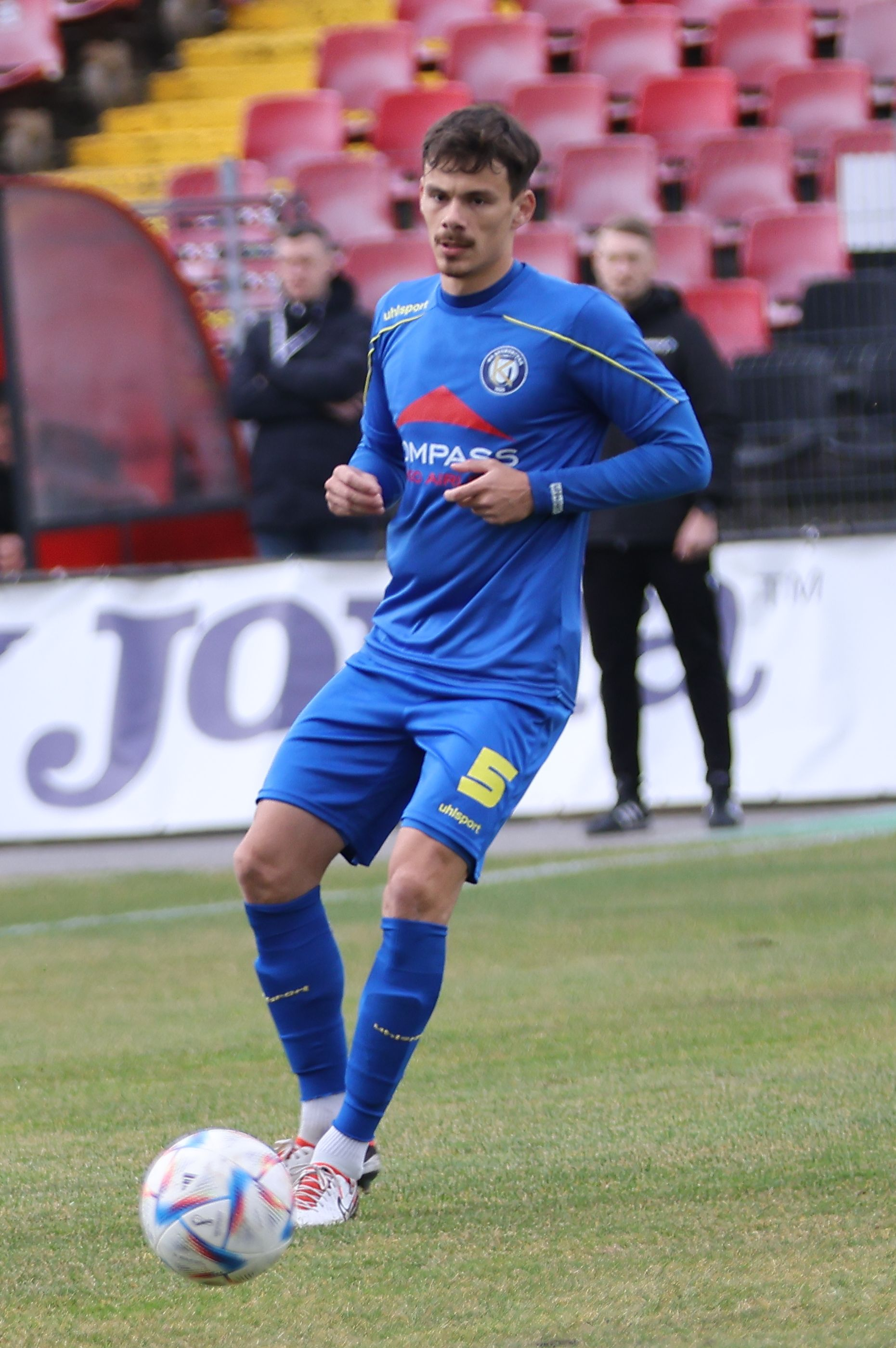
- Simic playing for Krumovgrad in 2024

Personal information
- Date of birth: 29 November 1995 (age 30)
- Place of birth: Split, Croatia
- Height: 1.90 m (6 ft 3 in)
- Position: Centre-back

Team information
- Current team: Torpedo Kutaisi
- Number: 4

Youth career
- –2014: Dugopolje

Senior career*
| Years | Team | Apps | (Gls) |
| 2014 | Dugopolje | 1 | (0) |
| 2014 | Orihuela B | | |
| 2014–2015 | Unión Molinense | 9 | (0) |
| 2015–2016 | Torrevieja | 24 | (0) |
| 2016–2017 | Muro | 27 | (0) |
| 2017–2019 | Amorebieta | 70 | (1) |
| 2019–2021 | Lleida Esportiu | 46 | (1) |
| 2021–2022 | Logroñés | 18 | (0) |
| 2022–2023 | Numancia | 24 | (0) |
| 2023–2024 | Krumovgrad | 52 | (2) |
| 2025 | Sepsi OSK | 14 | (0) |
| 2025– | Torpedo Kutaisi | 38 | (2) |
- * Club domestic league appearances and goals as of 1 September 2026

Matej Šimić (born 29 November 1995) is a Croatian professional footballer who plays as a centre-back for Erovnuli Liga club Torpedo Kutaisi.

== Club career ==
Šimić made his senior debut playing for the Croatian second-tier side Dugopolje in 2014. He spent the 2014–2015 season in the Spanish lower leagues at Orihuela B and Unión Molinense. He played in the Tercera División for Torrevieja and Muro between 2015 and 2017. He played in the Primera Federación for Amorebieta, Lleida Esportiu, Logroñés and Numancia between 2017 and 2023.

In 2023 he joined Bulgarian First League side Krumovgrad.

In January 2025 he joined Liga I side Sepsi OSK on a one-and-a-half-year deal.

In June 2025, Erovnuli Liga club Torpedo Kutaisi announced the signing of Šimić. After featuring in both Super cup games, he bagged a brace, including a deep stoppage-time winner, in a dramatic 4–3 win over Kazakh side Ordabasy in the 1st qualifying round of the 2025–26 UEFA Conference League.
