= Paris Psaltis =

Cypriot footballer (born 1996)

Personal information
- Date of birth: 12 November 1996 (age 30)
- Place of birth: Nicosia, Cyprus
- Height: 1.78 m (5 ft 10 in)
- Position: Right back

Team information
- Current team: Dinamo Tbilisi
- Number: 17

Youth career
- 2012–2014: APOEL

Senior career*
Years	Team	Apps	(Gls)
2014–2016	APOEL	0	(0)
2016–2019	Ermis Aradippou	70	(1)
2019–2021	Olympiakos Nicosia	52	(1)
2021–2024	Omonia	37	(0)
2024–2025	Omonia 29M	9	(0)
2025–2026	Ethnikos Achna	37	(3)
2026–	Dinamo Tbilisi	11	(0)

International career^{‡}
2016–2018	Cyprus U21	11	(0)
2021–	Cyprus	1	(0)
- * Club domestic league appearances and goals as of 14 June 2026 ‡ National team caps and goals as of 27 March 2021

Paris Psaltis (Greek: Πάρης Ψάλτης, born 12 November 1996) is a Cypriot professional footballer who plays as a right back for Dinamo Tbilisi and the Cyprus national team.

== Club career ==
On 26 June, Dinamo announced the signing of Psaltis from Ethnikos Achna on a contract until the end of 2027.

== International career ==
He made his debut for Cyprus national football team on 27 March 2021 in a World Cup qualifier against Croatia.

== Career statistics ==
=== Club ===
As of 14 Apr 2024

Club	Season	League			Cup		Continental		Other		Total	
Club	Season	Division	Apps	Goals	Apps	Goals	Apps	Goals	Apps	Goals	Apps	Goals
Ermis Aradippou	2016–17	Cypriot First Division	13	1	0	0	—		—		13	1
Ermis Aradippou	2017–18	Cypriot First Division	31	0	2	0	—		—		33	0
Ermis Aradippou	2018–19	Cypriot First Division	26	0	3	0	—		—		29	0
Ermis Aradippou	Total		70	1	5	0	—		—		75	1
Olympiakos Nicosia	2019–20	Cypriot First Division	22	1	1	0	—		—		23	1
Olympiakos Nicosia	2020–21	Cypriot First Division	30	0	5	0	—		—		35	0
Olympiakos Nicosia	Total		52	1	6	0	—		—		58	1
Omonia	2021–22	Cypriot First Division	17	0	5	0	10	0	1	0	33	0
Omonia	2022–23	Cypriot First Division	11	0	1	0	3	0	0	0	15	0
Omonia	2023–24	Cypriot First Division	9	0	1	0	0	0	0	0	10	0
Omonia	Total		37	0	7	0	13	0	1	0	58	0
Career total			160	2	18	0	13	0	1	0	191	2

== Honours ==
Omonia

- Cypriot Cup: 2021–22, 2022–23
- Cypriot Super Cup: 2021
