= Novica Eraković =

Montenegrin footballer

Personal information
- Date of birth: 12 November 1999 (age 26)
- Place of birth: Nikšić, Montenegro, FR Yugoslavia
- Height: 1.87 m (6 ft 2 in)
- Position: Midfielder

Team information
- Current team: Panetolikos
- Number: 44

Youth career
- Sutjeska

Senior career*
Years	Team	Apps	(Gls)
2018–2023	Sutjeska	107	(9)
2018–2019	→ Lovćen (loan)	30	(0)
2023–2026	Omonia	45	(5)
2026–	Panetolikos	5	(0)

International career^{‡}
2019–2020	Montenegro U21	7	(0)
2022–	Montenegro	7	(0)
- * Club domestic league appearances and goals as of 20 September 2026 ‡ National team caps and goals as of 25 June 2025

Novica Eraković (Cyrillic: Новица Ераковић; born 12 November 1999) is a Montenegrin professional footballer who plays as a midfielder for Super League Greece club Panetolikos and the Montenegro national team.

== Club career ==
Eraković is a youth product of Sutjeska, and began his senior career on loan with Lovćen in the Montenegrin First League for the 2018–19 season. He extended his contract with the club on 10 March 2022. He helped Sutjeska win the 2021–22 Montenegrin First League, and was named into the league's team of the season.

After winning the 2022–23 Montenegrin Cup with Sutjeska, he joined Cypriot club Omonia on a free transfer in June 2023. His official debut was postponed for a full year due to a cruciate ligament rupture he suffered in pre-season.

== International career ==
Eraković is a youth international for Montenegro, having played for the Montenegro U21s. He received his first callup to the senior Montenegro national team for a set of friendlies in March 2022. He debuted in a 1–0 friendly loss to Armenia on 23 March 2022.

== Career statistics ==
As of match played 25 December 2025

Appearances and goals by club, season and competition
Club	Season	League			National cup (Note: Includes Montenegrin Cup, Cypriot Cup)		Continental		Other		Total	
Club	Season	Division	Apps	Goals	Apps	Goals	Apps	Goals	Apps	Goals	Apps	Goals
Lovćen (loan)	2018–19	Montenegrin First League	30	0	1	0	—		—		31	0
Sutjeska	2019–20	Montenegrin First League	20	1	1	0	5 (Note: Three appearances in UEFA Champions League, two appearances in UEFA Europa League)	0	—		26	1
Sutjeska	2020–21	Montenegrin First League	26	0	0	0	0	0	—		26	0
Sutjeska	2021–22	Montenegrin First League	28	3	0	0	4 (Note: Appearances in UEFA Conference League)	0	—		32	3
Sutjeska	2022–23	Montenegrin First League	33	5	1	0	4 (Note: Two appearances in UEFA Champions League, two appearances in UEFA Europa Conference League)	0	—		38	1
Sutjeska	Total		107	9	2	0	13	0	—		122	9
Omonia	2023–24	Cypriot First Division	0	0	0	0	0	0	0	0	0	0
Omonia	2024–25	Cypriot First Division	30	4	3	0	14	0	—		47	4
Omonia	2025–26	Cypriot First Division	7	1	0	0	11	0	—		18	1
Omonia	Total		37	5	3	0	25	0	—		65	5
Career total			174	14	6	0	38	0	0	0	218	14

== Honours ==
Sutjeska

- Montenegrin First League: 2021–22
- Montenegrin Cup: 2022–23

Omonia

- Cypriot First Division: 2025–26
