= Giorgos Malekkidis =

Cypriot footballer (born 1997)

Personal information
- Date of birth: 14 July 1997 (age 29)
- Place of birth: Limassol, Cyprus
- Height: 1.83 m (6 ft 0 in)
- Position: Defender

Team information
- Current team: Apollon Limassol
- Number: 14

Youth career
- –2015: Aris Limassol

Senior career*
Years	Team	Apps	(Gls)
2014–2020	Aris Limassol	66	(9)
2016–2017	→ Enosis Neon Parekklisia (loan)	26	(2)
2020–	Apollon Limassol	89	(7)
2020–2021	→ Karmiotissa (loan)	18	(1)
2023	→ Nea Salamis (loan)	12	(0)

International career^{‡}
2015	Cyprus U-19	5	(1)
2018	Cyprus U-21	1	(0)
2024–	Cyprus	17	(0)
- * Club domestic league appearances and goals as of 14 June 2026 ‡ National team caps and goals as of 20:47, 15 November 2026 (UTC)

Giorgos Malekkidis (Greek: Γιώργος Μαλεκκίδης; born 14 July 1997) is a Cypriot football player who plays for Apollon Limassol.

== Club career ==
He made his Cypriot First Division debut for Aris Limassol on 19 December 2015 in a game against Ermis Aradippou.
