= Fotis Papoulis =

Cypriot footballer (born 1985)

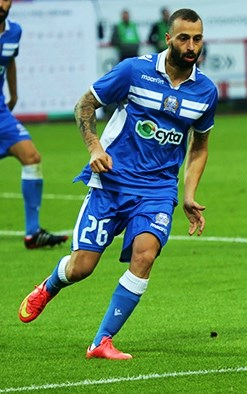

Personal information
- Full name: Fotios Papoulis
- Date of birth: 22 January 1985 (age 41)
- Place of birth: Athens, Greece
- Height: 1.73 m (5 ft 8 in)
- Positions: Forward; attacking midfielder

Youth career
- Omonoia

Senior career*
| Years | Team | Apps | (Gls) |
| 2006–2008 | Acharnaikos | 47 | (18) |
| 2008–2009 | Lamia | 14 | (10) |
| 2009 | Panachaiki | 5 | (0) |
| 2009–2010 | Pyrsos Grevena | 19 | (7) |
| 2010–2011 | Panthrakikos | 28 | (5) |
| 2011–2012 | OFI | 41 | (9) |
| 2012–2020 | Apollon Limassol | 210 | (84) |
| 2020–2023 | Omonia | 78 | (16) |

International career^{‡}
| 2018–2022 | Cyprus | 24 | (14) |
- * Club domestic league appearances and goals as of 5 June 2023 ‡ National team caps and goals as of 14 November 2021

Fotis Papoulis (Greek: Φώτης Παπουλής; born 22 January 1985) is a retired professional footballer who last played for Omonia in the Cypriot First Division. Born in Greece, he played for the Cyprus national team.

== Club career ==
=== Early career ===
Papoulis began his football career with Acharnaikos F.C. in the Gamma Ethniki.

He made his Super League debut in January 2010 when he signed a professional contract with Panthrakikos. He scored three goals in twelve matches in the league.

In January 2011, he left the club, signing a six-month contract with OFI, helping them return to the Super League after the play-offs. The following year, he helped the club avoid relegation. It was a very successful season for Papoulis, as he was nominated as an MVP of the week and selected among the top 18 players in the 2011-12 Super League season.

=== Apollon Limassol ===
In summer 2012, Papoulis joined Cypriot club Apollon Limassol. In his first three seasons at the club, he won the Cypriot Cup, and competed in the group stage of the UEFA Europa League twice. He was also Apollon's top scorer in every one of these seasons.

In May 2016, Papoulis scored the first goal of the 2015–16 Cypriot Cup final against Omonia. His team won with a final score of 2–1, and lifted the trophy. The following season, he captained Apollon in the cup final against APOEL, and helped his team win the competition for the second consecutive season. Papoulis also played in the 2017-18 Cup final, however his team lost to AEK Larnaca, and failed to win the competition for the third time in a row.

On 2 August 2018, Papoulis scored a hat-trick in a home game against Željezničar Sarajevo, winning the match with a score of 3–1. This made him the first Greek player to score a hat-trick with a foreign club in a UEFA competition.

=== Omonia ===
In summer 2020, Papoulis signed a two-year contract with Omonia.

Οn 4 May 2021, Papoulis scored the winning goal in a 1–0 away win against AEK Larnaca. This win mathematically confirmed Omonia to be the champions of the 2020–21 Cypriot First Division. He was Omonia's top scorer in the league, tied with Marko Šćepović and Ernest Asante at eight goals.

Papoulis was one of Omonia's most consistent players in the disappointing 2021–22 campaign. He was Omonia's top scorer across all competitions with 11 goals, including two very important goals leading up to the Cup final; against AEL in the quarter-final, and against Anorthosis in the semi-final. He played in the final, but was substituted after five minutes, when an early red card forced Omonia coach Neil Lennon to change his plans for the game. His team went on to win the match on penalties.

On 14 June 2022, Papoulis extended his contract with Omonia for another year. His only goal of the 2022–23 season came on 3 September 2022, when he scored the winning goal in a 3–2 home win against AEK Larnaca. On 24 May 2023, Papoulis came off the bench to assist the winning goal in the 2022–23 Cypriot Cup final, winning the trophy for the fifth time in his career; aged 38, he announced his retirement from football after the match.

== International career ==
In August 2018, after many years of residence in Cyprus, Papoulis settled all the necessary documents and has acquired the Cypriot citizenship and is eligible to participate in Cyprus national football team. On 6 September 2018, he made his debut with Cyprus national football team in a 2–0 away loss against Norway for the Nations League competition.

=== International goals ===
Scores and results list Cyprus' goal tally first.

| No. | Date | Venue | Opponent | Score | Result | Competition |
|---|---|---|---|---|---|---|
| 1. | 16 October 2018 | Stožice Stadium, Ljubljana, Slovenia | Slovenia | 1–0 | 1–1 | 2018–19 UEFA Nations League C |
| 2. | 9 September 2019 | San Marino Stadium, Serravalle, San Marino | San Marino | 2–0 | 4–0 | UEFA Euro 2020 qualification |
| 3. | 11 October 2021 | AEK Arena, Larnaca, Cyprus | Malta | 1–0 | 2–2 | 2022 FIFA World Cup qualification |

== Career statistics (from 2009 onwards) ==
| season | club | league | Championship | | Cup (Note: includes appearance(s) in Cypriot Super Cup) | | International | | Total | |
| season | club | league | appear | goals | appear | goals | appear | goals | appear | goals |
| 2009–10 | Pyrsos Grevena | Gamma Ethniki | 19 | 3 | 0 | 0 | 0 | 0 | 19 | 3 |
| 2009–10 | Panthrakikos | Super League Greece | 12 | 3 | 3 | 0 | 0 | 0 | 15 | 3 |
| 2010–11 | Panthrakikos | Beta Ethniki | 16 | 2 | 1 | 0 | 0 | 0 | 17 | 2 |
| 2010–11 | OFI | Beta Ethniki | 18 | 3 | 0 | 0 | 0 | 0 | 18 | 3 |
| 2011–12 | OFI | Super League Greece | 23 | 6 | 5 | 1 | 0 | 0 | 28 | 7 |
| 2012–13 | Apollon Limassol | Cypriot First Division | 26 | 9 | 6 | 2 | 0 | 0 | 32 | 11 |
| 2013–14 | Apollon Limassol | Cypriot First Division | 29 | 12 | 6 | 1 | 7 | 1 | 42 | 14 |
| 2014–15 | Apollon Limassol | Cypriot First Division | 30 | 14 | 2 | 0 | 7 | 2 | 39 | 16 |
| 2015–16 | Apollon Limassol | Cypriot First Division | 25 | 9 | 5 | 1 | 5 | 2 | 35 | 12 |
| 2016–17 | Apollon Limassol | Cypriot First Division | 33 | 14 | 5 | 1 | 1 | 1 | 39 | 16 |
| 2017–18 | Apollon Limassol | Cypriot First Division | 23 | 15 | 4 | 1 | 2 | 0 | 29 | 16 |
| 2018–19 | Apollon Limassol | Cypriot First Division | 24 | 6 | 4 | 0 | 13 | 4 | 41 | 10 |
| 2019–20 | Apollon Limassol | Cypriot First Division | 20 | 5 | 4 | 1 | 5 | 1 | 29 | 7 |
| 2020-21 | AC Omonia | Cypriot First Division | 29 | 8 | 1 | 0 | 6 | 0 | 36 | 8 |
| 2021-22 | AC Omonia | Cypriot First Division | 24 | 7 | 7 | 4 | 8 | 0 | 38 | 11 |
| 2022-23 | AC Omonia | Cypriot First Division | 25 | 1 | 6 | 0 | 8 | 0 | 38 | 1 |
| Career total | | | 366 | 115 | 54 | 8 | 62 | 11 | 482 | 134 |

Date of last update: 10 January 2022

== Honours ==
Apollon Limassol

- Cypriot Cup: 2012–13, 2015–16, 2016–17
- Cypriot Super Cup: 2016

Omonoia

- Cypriot First Division: 2020–21
- Cypriot Cup: 2021–22, 2022–23
- Cypriot Super Cup: 2021
