= 2022–23 Cypriot Cup =

81st season of Cypriot Cup

2022–23 Cyprus Coca-Cola Cup

Tournament details
- Country: Cyprus
- Dates: 5 October 2022 – 24 May 2023
- Teams: 25

Final positions
- Champions: Omonia Nicosia
- Runners-up: AEL Limassol

Tournament statistics
- Matches played: 30
- Goals scored: 84 (2.8 per match)

The 2022–23 Cypriot Cup was the 81st edition of the Cypriot Cup. A total of 23 clubs were accepted to enter the competition. It began in October 2022 with the first round and concluded on 24 May 2023 with the final held at the GSP Stadium. Omonia FC won the Cup for the 16th time and qualified for the 2023–24 Europa Conference League second qualifying round.

== First round ==
The first round draw took place on 21 September 2022.

Team 1	Score	Team 2
5 October 2022
Othellos Athienou	1–3	Doxa Katokopias
AEZ Zakakiou	0–3	Pafos
6 October 2022
AEL Limassol	1–0	Ermis Aradippou
11 October 2022
Achyronas-Onisilos	0–3	APOEL
12 October 2022
Nea Salamis Famagusta	3–1 (a.e.t.)	Peyia 2014
Enosis Neon Paralimni	4–1	Olympias Lympion
19 October 2022
Akritas Chlorakas	1–0	Omonia 29th May
Karmiotissa	3–2	Digenis Ypsonas
26 October 2022
PAEEK	1–4	Anorthosis Famagusta

== Second round ==
The second round draw took place on 26 October 2022.

Team 1	Score	Team 2
2 November 2022
P.O. Xylotymbou 2006	0–2	Olympiakos Nicosia
1 December 2022
Omonia Nicosia	2–1	Karmiotissa
11 January 2023
AEL Limassol	0–0 (a.e.t.) (5–4 p)	Apollon Limassol
Nea Salamis Famagusta	4–0	AEK Larnaca
12 January 2023
Doxa Katokopias	5–1	Ethnikos Achna
17 January 2023
Pafos	3–1	Akritas Chlorakas
18 January 2023
APOEL	4–2	Aris Limassol
19 January 2023
Anorthosis Famagusta	0–0 (a.e.t.) (4–3 p)	Enosis Neon Paralimni

== Quarter-finals ==
The matches were played between 14 February and 2 March 2023.

Team 1	Agg.	Team 2	1st leg	2nd leg
AEL Limassol	2–1	Nea Salamis Famagusta	1–0	1–1
Doxa Katokopias	2–5	Pafos	1–4	1–1
Omonia Nicosia	3–2	APOEL	1–2	2–0
Olympiakos Nicosia	3–2	Anorthosis Famagusta	2–1	1–1

== Semi-finals ==
The matches were played on 5, 6 and 26 April 2023.

Team 1	Agg.	Team 2	1st leg	2nd leg
Olympiakos Nicosia	0–1	AEL Limassol	0–0	0–1
Pafos	2–4	Omonia Nicosia	1–1	1–3

== Final ==
24 May 2023
19:00 EEST

AEL Limassol	0–1	Omonia Nicosia
	Report	Ansarifard 85'

GSP Stadium, Nicosia
Attendance: 19,076
Referee: Szymon Marciniak (Poland)

GK	1	(Brazil) Muriel
CB	91	(Belgium) Sébastien Dewaest
CB	4	(Portugal) André Teixeira (c)
CB	66	(Brazil) Djalma Silva
RWB	6	(Serbia) Slobodan Medojević
CM	33	(Argentina) Javier Mendoza		(substituted off) 90+1'
CM	8	(North Macedonia) Davor Zdravkovski	(yellow card) 63'
LWB	15	(Cyprus) Stylianos Panteli	(yellow card) 25'	(substituted off) 65'
RW	21	(Cyprus) Evangelos Andreou		(substituted off) 90+1'
LW	19	(Romania) Nicolae Milinceanu		(substituted off) 65'
CF	14	(Cyprus) Andreas Makris
Substitutes:
CF	7	(France) Jared Khasa		(substituted on) 65'
RW	61	(Belgium) Kevin Mirallas		(substituted on) 65'
LW	27	(Democratic Republic of the Congo) Aaron Tshibola		(substituted on) 90+1'
CF	28	(Lithuania) Fedor Černych		(substituted on) 90+1'
Manager:
(Cyprus) Christos Charalabous

GK	40	(Brazil) Fabiano
LB	17	(Czech Republic) Jan Lecjaks
CB	30	(Cyprus) Nikolas Panayiotou
CB	6	(Spain) Hector Yuste	(yellow card) 90+1'
RB	3	(Wales) Adam Matthews
DM	31	(Cyprus) Ioannis Kousoulos (c)
CM	42	(United States) Mix Diskerud		(substituted off) 57'
AM	18	(Iran) Karim Ansarifard		(substituted off) 90+1'
RW	10	(Cyprus) Loizos Loizou		(substituted off) 90+1'
LW	20	(Cyprus) Panagiotis Zachariou	(yellow card) 45+1'	(substituted off) 57'
CF	80	(Cyprus) Andronikos Kakoullis		(substituted off) 73'
Substitutes:
AM	13	(Cyprus) Fotis Papoulis		(substituted on) 57'
DF	19	(Comoros) Fouad Bachirou		(substituted on) 57'
CM	90	(Ukraine) Roman Bezus		(substituted on) 73'
CM	76	(Cyprus) Charalampos Charalampous		(substituted on) 90+1'
CB	73	(Serbia) Nemanja Miletić		(substituted on) 90+1'
Manager:
(Cyprus) Sofronis Avgousti

== See also ==
- 2022–23 Cypriot First Division
- 2022–23 Cypriot Second Division
