= 2025–26 Cypriot First Division =

Cypriot football league season

Cyprus League by Stoiximan
- Season: 2025–26
- Dates: 22 August 2025 – 22 May 2026
- Champions: Omonia (22nd title)
- Relegated: Akritas; Ethnikos Achna; Enosis Neon Paralimni
- UEFA Champions League: Omonia
- UEFA Europa League: Pafos
- UEFA Conference League: AEK Larnaca; Apollon Limassol
- Matches: 237
- Goals: 617 (2.6 per match)
- Top goalscorer: Ryan Mmaee (25 goals)
- Biggest home win: Omonia Nicosia 5–0 AEL (22 September 2025); AEK Larnaca 5–0 Enosis Neon (31 January 2026); Omonia Nicosia 5–0 Olympiakos Nicosia (15 March 2026)
- Biggest away win: Anorthosis 0–5 Omonia Nicosia (28 September 2025)
- Highest scoring: Aris Limassol 3–5 Omonia Nicosia (25 January 2026)
- Longest winning run: 9 matches Apollon (21 December 2025 - 21 February 2026)
- Longest unbeaten run: 15 matches Apollon (21 December 2025 - 18 April 2026)
- Longest winless run: 26 matches Enosis Neon (29 August 2025 - 20 March 2026)
- Longest losing run: 20 matches Enosis Neon (18 October 2025 - 20 March 2026)

The 2025–26 Cypriot First Division (known as Cyprus League by Stoiximan for sponsorship reasons), was the 87th season of the Cypriot top-level football league.

Pafos are the defending champions, having won their 1st title in the 2024–25 season.

== Stadiums and locations ==
Locations of the 2025–26 Cypriot First Division teams.

Team	Location	Stadium	Capacity
AEK Larnaca	Larnaca	AEK Arena	7,400
AEL Limassol	Limassol	Alphamega Stadium	10,700
Akritas Chlorakas	Chloraka	Stelios Kyriakides Stadium	9,394
Anorthosis Famagusta	Larnaca	Antonis Papadopoulos Stadium	10,230
APOEL	Nicosia	GSP Stadium	22,859
Apollon Limassol	Limassol	Alphamega Stadium	10,700
Aris Limassol	Limassol	Alphamega Stadium	10,700
Enosis Neon Paralimni	Paralimni	Tasos Markou Stadium	5,800
Ethnikos Achnas	Achna	Dasaki Stadium	7,000
Krasava	Ypsonas	Ammochostos Stadium	5,500
Olympiakos Nicosia	Nicosia	GSP Stadium	22,859
Omonia Aradippou	Aradippou	Antonis Papadopoulos Stadium	10,230
Omonia Nicosia	Nicosia	GSP Stadium	22,859
Pafos	Paphos	Stelios Kyriakides Stadium	9,394

== Structure ==
14 teams participate in the league. In the first round, known as Regular Season, all teams play each other home and away, for a total of 26 games each. In the second round, the league splits into two groups: Teams ranked 1–6 enter the Championship Playoffs, whereas teams ranked 7–14 enter the Relegation playoffs. The teams in the Championship Playoffs play each other home and away for an additional 10 games each, while the teams in the Relegation Playoffs play each other only once, either home or away, for an additional 7 games each. All criteria (such as points, goal difference, and head to head records) are retained during the transition from first to second round. The team ranked first in the Championship Playoffs are declared champions, while the bottom three teams in the Relegation Playoffs are relegated to the Second Division.

== Regular season ==
=== League table ===
Pos	Team	Pld	W	D	L	GF	GA	GD	Pts	Qualification or relegation
1	Omonia	26	19	4	3	63	17	+46	61	Qualification for the Championship round
2	AEK Larnaca	26	16	5	5	49	22	+27	53	Qualification for the Championship round
3	Apollon Limassol	26	16	5	5	36	22	+14	53	Qualification for the Championship round
4	Pafos	26	16	3	7	53	24	+29	51	Qualification for the Championship round
5	APOEL	26	13	6	7	45	27	+18	45	Qualification for the Championship round
6	Aris Limassol	26	12	7	7	48	26	+22	43	Qualification for the Championship round
7	Omonia Aradippou	26	10	4	12	23	31	−8	34	Qualification for the Relegation round
8	AEL Limassol	26	10	3	13	31	38	−7	33	Qualification for the Relegation round
9	Anorthosis Famagusta	26	7	11	8	23	33	−10	32	Qualification for the Relegation round
10	Krasava	26	8	4	14	26	36	−10	28	Qualification for the Relegation round
11	Olympiakos Nicosia	26	6	10	10	22	37	−15	28	Qualification for the Relegation round
12	Akritas Chlorakas	26	7	5	14	23	48	−25	26	Qualification for the Relegation round
13	Ethnikos Achna	26	7	2	17	25	44	−19	23	Qualification for the Relegation round
14	Enosis Neon Paralimni	26	0	1	25	5	67	−62	1	Qualification for the Relegation round

Source: Cyprus Football Association
Rules for classification: 1) Points; 2) Head-to-head points; 3) Head-to-head goal difference; 4) Head-to-head goals scored; 5) Head-to-head away goals scored (only if two teams); 6) Goal difference; 7) Goals scored; 8) Play-off (only if deciding championship round, relegation round or relegation).

=== Results ===
Home \ Away	AEK	AEL	AKR	ANO	APO	APL	ARI	ENO	ETH	KYP	OLY	OAR	OMO	PAF
AEK Larnaca	—	2–0	3–0	4–0	1–1	0–1	3–2	5–0	2–1	2–1	1–1	1–0	1–1	2–4
AEL Limassol	0–1	—	0–2	4–1	2–3	2–2	2–1	3–0	2–2	1–0	2–0	1–2	0–2	0–1
Akritas Chlorakas	1–1	0–2	—	2–0	0–4	0–2	1–1	1–0	3–1	1–3	1–1	0–1	0–4	0–4
Anorthosis Famagusta	1–1	2–1	2–2	—	1–1	1–1	1–1	3–0	1–0	1–1	0–0	0–0	0–5	1–1
APOEL	1–2	1–2	2–1	0–2	—	2–0	2–0	3–0	4–1	0–0	2–2	1–1	1–0	0–1
Apollon Limassol	1–2	2–1	4–0	0–0	2–1	—	0–2	3–0	1–0	0–3	3–1	1–0	2–0	2–1
Aris Limassol	1–0	4–1	3–1	0–1	1–2	3–1	—	4–0	3–0	3–0	2–0	2–2	3–5	2–2
Enosis Neon Paralimni	0–2	0–2	0–1	2–3	0–2	0–1	0–4	—	0–2	0–1	0–2	0–1	0–2	0–2
Ethnikos Achna	0–2	0–1	0–0	2–0	3–2	0–1	0–3	5–1	—	1–0	0–1	0–1	2–1	2–1
Krasava	0–4	3–0	0–3	0–1	1–2	0–1	1–1	4–0	1–0	—	1–0	2–0	1–2	2–3
Olympiakos Nicosia	1–4	0–0	1–3	2–1	0–2	2–2	0–0	1–1	2–1	1–1	—	0–0	0–3	2–0
Omonia Aradippou	2–1	1–3	2–0	1–0	0–4	0–1	0–1	4–1	3–2	1–0	0–1	—	0–2	0–2
Omonia	1–0	5–0	3–0	2–0	2–2	1–1	0–0	3–0	4–0	1–0	5–0	3–1	—	2–1
Pafos	1–2	1–0	4–0	0–0	2–0	0–1	2–1	3–0	4–0	7–0	2–1	2–0	2–4	—

Source: Cyprus Football Association
Legend: Blue = home team win; Yellow = draw; Red = away team win.

== Championship round ==
Pos	Team	Pld	W	D	L	GF	GA	GD	Pts	Qualification	OMO	AEK	APL	PAF	APO	ARI
1	Omonia (C)	36	27	6	3	88	24	+64	87	Qualification for the Champions League second qualifying round	—	1–1	5–2	2–0	2–0	3–0
2	AEK Larnaca	36	20	9	7	62	33	+29	69	Qualification for the Conference League second qualifying round	0–2	—	1–0	2–2	1–0	2–0
3	Apollon Limassol	36	20	7	9	52	41	+11	67	Qualification for the Conference League second qualifying round	2–3	1–1	—	2–1	2–0	3–2
4	Pafos	36	18	8	10	66	38	+28	62	Qualification for the Europa League second qualifying round (Note: The winner of the 2025–26 Cypriot Cup (Pafos) qualified for the Europa League second qualifying round.)	0–2	1–1	1–1	—	2–0	2–0
5	APOEL	36	15	7	14	53	45	+8	52		0–3	1–0	2–3	3–3	—	2–1
6	Aris Limassol	36	14	9	13	61	45	+16	51		2–2	3–4	3–0	1–1	1–0	—

Source: Soccerway
Legend: Blue = home team win; Yellow = draw; Red = away team win.
Rules for classification: 1) Points; 2) Points in regular season; 3) Head-to-head points in regular season; 4) Head-to-head goal difference in regular season; 5) Head-to-head goals scored in regular season; 6) Head-to-head away goals scored in regular season (if two teams tied); 7) Goal difference; 8) Goals scored; 9) Fair play ranking; 10) Drawing of lots.
(C) Champions

== Relegation round ==
Pos	Team	Pld	W	D	L	GF	GA	GD	Pts	Relegation	ANO	AEL	OAR	KRA	OLY	AKR	ETH	ENO
7	Anorthosis Famagusta	33	11	12	10	35	40	−5	45		—		1–1	5–2		3–2	—	2–0
8	AEL Limassol	33	13	5	15	41	46	−5	44		0–1	—	—		1–3		1–1	2–1
9	Omonia Aradippou	33	12	6	15	31	42	−11	42			0–3	—	1–1		2–1		1–2
10	Krasava	33	11	7	15	36	44	−8	40			1–1		—	1–0	—	3–1	0–0
11	Olympiakos Nicosia	33	10	10	13	32	44	−12	40		1–0		2–1	—	—	0–1		—
12	Akritas Chlorakas (R)	33	10	5	18	31	58	−27	35	Relegation to the Cypriot Second Division	—	1–2		0–2		—	1–0	
13	Ethnikos Achna (R)	33	10	3	20	34	53	−19	33	Relegation to the Cypriot Second Division	1–0	—	1–2		2–1		—	
14	Enosis Neon Paralimni (R)	33	1	2	30	11	80	−69	5	Relegation to the Cypriot Second Division			—		1–3	1–2	1–3	—

Source: Soccerway
Legend: Blue = home team win; Yellow = draw; Red = away team win.
Rules for classification: 1) Points; 2) Points in regular season; 3) Head-to-head points in regular season; 4) Head-to-head goal difference in regular season; 5) Head-to-head goals scored in regular season; 6) Head-to-head away goals scored in regular season (if two teams tied); 7) Goal difference; 8) Goals scored; 9) Fair play ranking; 10) Drawing of lots.
(R) Relegated

== Season statistics ==
=== Top scorers ===
As of 22 May 2026

Rank	Player	Club	Goals
1	(Morocco) Ryan Mmaee	Omonia	25
2	(Cape Verde) Willy Semedo	Omonia	17
3	(Argentina) Nicolás Andereggen	Ethnikos Achna	8
4	(Bosnia and Herzegovina) Hrvoje Miličević	AEK Larnaca	7
5	(Cyprus) Pieros Sotiriou	APOEL	7
6	(Serbia) Đorđe Ivanović	AEK Larnaca	6
7	(Suriname) Jaden Montnor	Aris Limassol	6
8	(Brazil) Anderson Silva	Pafos	6
9	(Serbia) Stefan Dražić	APOEL	6
10	(Portugal) Domingos Quina	Pafos	5

== Awards ==
=== Monthly awards ===
Month	Player of the Month		Goal of the Month		References
Month	Player	Club	Player	Club	References
August/September	(Greece) Kostas Stafylidis	APOEL	(Cyprus) Evangelos Andreou	Omonia Nicosia	
October	(Greece) Christos Talichmanidis	Olympiakos Nicosia	(Cyprus) Paris Psaltis	Ethnikos Achna	
November	(South Africa) Luther Singh	AEL Limassol	(Czech Republic) Josef Kvída	Apollon Limassol	
December	(Greece) Giannis Masouras	Omonia	(Cyprus) Nikolas Koutsakos	Olympiakos Nicosia	
January	(Sweden) Zakaria Sawo	AEL Limassol	(Brazil) Jean Felipe	Olympiakos Nicosia	
February	(France) Gaétan Weissbeck	Apollon Limassol	(Greece) Christos Giousis	Ethnikos Achna	
March	(Cyprus) Panagiotis Andreou	Omonia	(Portugal) Vieirinha	Olympiakos Nicosia	
April/May	(Cyprus) Giorgos Malekkidis	Apollon Limassol	(Morocco) Ryan Mmaee	Omonia	

=== Annual awards ===
Award	Winner	Team
Top scorer	(Morocco) Ryan Mmaee	Omonia
Golden Glove	(Brazil) Fabiano Freitas	Omonia
Top Goal	(Czech Republic) Josef Kvída	Apollon Limassol
Top Save	(Brazil) Fabiano Freitas	Omonia
Coach of the Year	(Norway) Henning Berg	Omonia
Young Player of the Year	(Cyprus) Panagiotis Andreou	Omonia
The Best Player by Unicars	(Cape Verde) Willy Semedo	Omonia

Team of the Year
Goalkeeper	(Brazil) Fabiano Freitas (Omonia)			
Defence	(Czech Republic) Josef Kvída (Apollon Limassol)	(Bosnia and Herzegovina) Hrvoje Miličević (AEK Larnaca)	(Mali) Senou Coulibaly (Omonia)	(Greece) Giannis Masouras (Omonia)
Midfield	(Cyprus) Panagiotis Andreou (Omonia)	(Italy) Stefano Sensi (Anorthosis)	(Cape Verde) Willy Semedo (Omonia)	(Brazil) Ewandro (Omonia)
Attack	(Spain) Brandon Thomas (Apollon Limassol)		(Morocco) Ryan Mmaee (Omonia)	

== Attendances ==
Cypriot First Division clubs listed by average home league attendance:

Pos	Club	Average attendance
1	Omonoia	8,651
2	APOEL	7,143
3	Anorthosis	5,625
4	Apollon	4,950
5	Pafos	4,286
6	AEK Larnaka	3,324
7	AE Limassol	3,250
8	Aris Limassol	1,625
9	Omonoia Aradippou	1,429
10	Olympiakos Nicosia	1,329
11	Ypsonas	1,083
12	Ethnikos Achna	1,057
13	Enosis	900
14	Akritas	671
