= 2023–24 Anorthosis Famagusta FC season =

Anorthosis Famagusta
2023–24 season
- President: Andreas Santis
- Head coach: David Gallego
- Stadium: Antonis Papadopoulos Stadium
- Cypriot First Division: 3rd
- Cypriot Cup: Pre-season
- Top goalscorer: League: Miguel Ángel Guerrero (3); All: Miguel Ángel Guerrero (3)
- Biggest win: Anorthosis Famagusta 3–1 Ethnikos Achna

The 2023–24 Anorthosis Famagusta season is the 78th season in the top flight. In addition to the domestic league, Anorthosis will participate in this season's editions of the Cypriot Cup. The season covers the period from 1 July 2023 until 31 May 2024.

Anorthosis will not compete in any European competition due to finishing 7th in the 2022–23 Cypriot First Division.

On 14 June 2023, Anorthosis announced that David Gallego would become the new head coach.

== Kits ==
- Supplier: Puma
- Sponsor:: Fonbet

Home	Away

== Management team ==
=== Coaching staff ===
As of 14 June 2023

Position	Name
Sport Director	(Spain) Antonio Prieto
Head coach	(Spain) David Gallego
Assistant coaches	(Cyprus) Ioannis Okkas, (Spain) Oscar Suárez
Fitness coach	(Spain) Alejandro Prieto Sánchez
Rehabilitation Coach	(Cyprus) Stelios Patiniotis
Goalkeeping coach	(Cyprus) Antonis Georgallides
Analyst	(Cyprus) Stelios Antoniou

=== Team Staff ===
As of 14 June 2023

Position	Name
Chief Administrator	(Cyprus) Ioulios Konnaris
Assistant Administrator	(Cyprus) Christos Patsikkou
Physiotherapist	(Cyprus) Michalis Athanasiou
Masseurs	(Cyprus) Periklis Anastasi, (Bulgaria) Plamen Panov
Caregivers	(Cyprus) Antonis Panagiotou, (Cyprus) Prodromos Foivou
Nutritionist	(Cyprus) Flora Georgalla

== Players ==
=== Current squad ===
No.	Player	Nat.	Pos. (s)	Date of Birth (Age)	Signed	Prev. club	Contract until	Notes
Goalkeepers
1	Iván Arboleda	(Colombia)	GK	21 April 1996 (age 29)	2023	(Spain) Rayo Vallecano	2024	
51	Anastasios Pishias	(Cyprus)	GK	19 December 2006 (age 19)	2023	(Cyprus) Olympiakos		
93	Neofytos Michael	(Cyprus)	GK	16 December 1993 (age 32)	2022	(Cyprus) APOEL	2024	
99	Andreas Keravnos	(Cyprus)	GK	5 May 1999 (age 26)	2022	(Cyprus) AEL Limassol	2025	
Defenders
2	Moussa Wagué	(Senegal)	RB	4 October 1998 (age 27)	2023	(Croatia) HNK Gorica	2026	
3	Fran García	(Spain)	LB	7 December 1992 (age 33)	2023	(Spain) Burgos	2025	
5	Nabil Marmouk	(Morocco)	CB	19 March 1998 (age 27)	2023	(Morocco) MAS Fès	2025	
6	Giannis Kargas	(Greece)	CB	9 December 1994 (age 31)	2023	(Greece) PAOK	2026	
7	Anderson Correia	(Cyprus)	LB	6 May 1991 (age 34)	2020	(Cyprus) Nea Salamina	2026	
15	Salva Ferrer	(Spain)	RB	21 January 1998 (age 28)	2023	(Italy) Spezia	2024	On Loan
22	Minas Antoniou	(Cyprus)	RB	22 February 1994 (age 31)	2022	(Cyprus) AEL Limassol	2024	
23	Kiko	(Portugal)	LB	21 January 1993 (age 33)	2022	(Cyprus) Omonia	2024	
44	Pavlos Correa	(Cyprus)	CB	14 July 1998 (age 27)	2017	(Cyprus) Youth Sector	2024	Made in Anorthosis Academy
Midfielders
4	Kostakis Artymatas (c)	(Cyprus)	DM / MF	15 April 1993 (age 32)	2019	(Cyprus) APOEL	2025	
8	Sergio Tejera	(Spain)	DM / MF	28 May 1990 (age 35)	2023	(Spain) Cartagena	2024	
10	Miguel Ángel Guerrero	(Spain)	AM / CF	12 July 1990 (age 35)	2023	(Greece) OFI	2024	
11	Hélder Ferreira	(Portugal)	RW	5 April 1997 (age 28)	2022	(Portugal) Paços Ferreira	2024	
12	Ousseynou Thioune	(Senegal)	DM / MF	16 November 1993 (age 32)	2023	(France) Dijon FCO	2025	
17	Daniil Paroutis	(Cyprus)	RW	2 January 2001 (age 25)	2020	(Italy) Novara	2024	Made in Anorthosis Academy
18	Stephanos Charalambous	(Cyprus)	AM	3 September 1999 (age 26)	2023	(Cyprus) Olympiakos	2025	
25	Erik Sabo	(Slovakia)	DM / MF	22 November 1991 (age 34)	2022	(Turkey) Rizespor	2024	
48	Michalis Ioannou	(Cyprus)	DM / MF	30 June 2000 (age 25)	2017	(Cyprus) Youth Sector	2025	Made in Anorthosis Academy
52	Konstantinos Konstantinou	(Cyprus)	DM / MF	7 September 2005 (age 20)	2023	(Cyprus) Youth Sector		Made in Anorthosis Academy
81	Chico Banza	(Angola)	LW	17 December 1998 (age 27)	2023	(Cyprus) Nea Salamina	2027	
88	Andreas Chrysostomou	(Cyprus)	DM / MF	14 January 2001 (age 25)	2020	(Italy) Sampdoria	2024	Made in Anorthosis Academy
Forwards
9	Sergio Castel	(Spain)	CF	22 February 1995 (age 30)	2023	(Spain) Burgos	2025	
20	Majeed Waris	(Ghana)	CF	19 September 1991 (age 34)	2022	(France) Strasbourg	2024	
21	Sekou Gassama	(Senegal)	CF	6 May 1995 (age 30)	2023	(Spain) Real Valladolid	2025	
50	Dimitrianos Juliou	(Cyprus)	CF	19 January 2006 (age 20)	2023	(Cyprus) Youth Sector		Made in Anorthosis Academy

== Transfers ==
=== In ===
Squad #	Pos.	Player	From	Fee	Date	Ref.
1	GK	(Colombia) Iván Arboleda	(Spain) Rayo Vallecano	Free Transfer	1 July 2023	
2	RB	(Senegal) Moussa Wagué	(Croatia) Gorica	Free Transfer	1 July 2023	
3	LB	(Spain) Fran García	(Spain) Burgos	Free Transfer	1 July 2023	
5	CB	(Morocco) Nabil Marmouk	(Morocco) MAS Fès	Free Transfer	12 July 2023	
6	CB	(Greece) Giannis Kargas	(Greece) PAOK	Free Transfer	1 July 2023	
9	ST	(Spain) Sergio Castel	(Spain) Burgos	Free Transfer	1 July 2023	
12	MF	(Senegal) Ousseynou Thioune	(France) Dijon	Free Transfer	3 August 2023	
15	RB	(Spain) Salva Ferrer	(Italy) Spezia	Loan Transfer	4 September 2023	
18	MF	(Cyprus) Stephanos Charalambous	(Cyprus) Olympiakos Nicosia	Free Transfer	1 July 2023	
21	ST	(Senegal) Sekou Gassama	(Spain) Real Valladolid	Free Transfer	12 August 2023	
51	GK	(Cyprus) Anastasios Pishias	(Cyprus) Olympiakos Nicosia	Free Transfer	1 July 2023	
81	LW	(Angola) Chico Banza	(Cyprus) Nea Salamina	€170,000	11 August 2023	

=== Out ===
Squad #	Pos.	Player	Transferred To	Fee	Date	Ref.
1	GK	(Georgia (country)) Giorgi Loria	(Georgia (country)) Dinamo Tbilisi	Free Transfer	30 June 2023	
2	CB	(Portugal) Marco Baixinho	Free agent	Released	30 June 2023	
3	CB	(Cyprus) Marios Antoniades	Free agent	Released	12 July 2023	
11	LW	(Georgia (country)) Avto Ebralidze	Free agent	Released	30 June 2023	
19	RB	(Armenia) Hovhannes Hambardzumyan	Free agent	Released	22 August 2023	
21	ST	(Spain) Antoñín	(Spain) Granada	End of loan	30 June 2023	
29	ST	(Chad) Casimir Ninga	Free agent	Released	4 July 2023	
77	RW	(Cyprus) Demetris Christofi	(Cyprus) Ethnikos Achna	Free Transfer	3 July 2023	
90	ST	(Slovakia) Samuel Mráz	(Italy) Spezia	End of loan	30 June 2023	
91	GK	(Cyprus) Giorgos Papadopoulos	Free agent	End of contract	30 June 2023	

=== Loans out ===
Start date	Position	Nationality	Player	To	End date	Ref.
14 September 2023	GK	(Cyprus)	Christoforos Vasileiou	MEAP Nisou	30 June 2024	
14 September 2023	RW	(Cyprus)	Sotiris Argyrou	POX	30 June 2024	

=== Overall transfer activity ===
==== Expenditure ====
Summer: ▼€170,000

Winter: ▼€0

Total: ▼€170,000

==== Income ====
Summer: ▲€0

Winter: ▲€0

Total: ▲€0

==== Net Totals ====
Summer: ▼€170,000

Winter: €0

Total: ▼€170,000

== Pre-season and friendlies ==
Win Draw Loss Fixtures

21 July 2023 Pre-season friendly	Anorthosis Famagusta (Cyprus)	1–1	(Cyprus) AEZ Zakakiou	Kyperounda, Cyprus
10:00 EEST (UTC+3)	Guerrero 45'	Report	Slogar 2'	Stadium: Kyperounda Stadium; Attendance: Behind closed doors Referee: Cyprus
Note: 90-minute match

28 July 2023 Pre-season friendly	Anorthosis Famagusta (Cyprus)	4–0	(Cyprus) Doxa Katokopias	Kyperounda, Cyprus
09:00 EEST (UTC+3)	Guerrero 4'; Castel 9'; G. Ioannou 39'; Waris 73'	Report		Stadium: Kyperounda Stadium; Attendance: Behind closed doors Referee: Cyprus
Note: 90-minute match

30 July 2023 Pre-season friendly	Achyronas-Onisilos (Cyprus)	0–6	(Cyprus) Anorthosis Famagusta	Sotira, Cyprus
19:00 EEST (UTC+3)		Report	Castel 3', 9'; Ferreira 39'; Marmouk 45'; Ioannou 64'; Paroutis 79'	Stadium: Sotira Municipal Stadium; Attendance: Behind closed doors Referee: Cyprus
Note: 90-minute match

6 August 2023 Pre-season friendly	Nea Salamina (Cyprus)	0–4	(Cyprus) Anorthosis Famagusta	Larnaca, Cyprus
20:00 EEST (UTC+3)		Report	Ferreira 30', 67'; Kargas 45'; Juliou 92'	Stadium: Ammochostos Stadium
Note: 90-minute match

12 August 2023 Pre-season friendly	Anorthosis Famagusta (Cyprus)	0–0	(Cyprus) AEL Limassol	Larnaca, Cyprus
20:00 EEST (UTC+3)		Report		Stadium: Antonis Papadopoulos Stadium
Note: 90-minute match

== Competitions ==
=== Overview ===
Competition	Starting round	Final position	Record							
Competition	Starting round	Final position	Pld	W	D	L	GF	GA	GD	Win %
Cyta Championship	Matchday 1	TBD	3	2	1	0	7	3	+4	66.67
Cypriot Cup	Round of 18	TBD					—			
Total			3	2	1	0	7	3	+4	66.67

Last updated: 19 August 2023
Source: Competitions

=== Cyta Championship ===
==== Regular season ====
===== League table =====
Pos	Team	Pld	W	D	L	GF	GA	GD	Pts	Qualification or relegation
4	Pafos	26	15	5	6	48	20	+28	50	Qualification for the Championship round
5	Omonia	26	14	7	5	49	30	+19	49	Qualification for the Championship round
6	Anorthosis Famagusta	26	14	5	7	38	23	+15	47	Qualification for the Championship round
7	Apollon Limassol	26	10	8	8	37	27	+10	38	Qualification for the Relegation round
8	Nea Salamis Famagusta	26	10	6	10	34	39	−5	36	Qualification for the Relegation round

Source: Soccerway
Rules for classification: 1) Points; 2) Head-to-head points; 3) Head-to-head goal difference; 4) Head-to-head goals scored; 5) Head-to-head away goals scored (only if two teams); 6) Goal difference; 7) Goals scored; 8) Play-off (only if deciding championship round, relegation round or relegation).

==== Results by Matchday ====
Matchday	1	2	3	4	5	6	7	8	9	10	11	12	13	14	15	16	17	18	19	20	21	22	23	24	25	26
Ground	H	A	H	A	H	A	H	A	H	A	H	A	H	A	H	A	H	A	H	A	H	A	H	A	H	A
Result	W	W	D	W	D																					
Position	3	1	3	3	1																					

Updated to match(es) played on 1 September 2023. Source:
A = Away; H = Home; W = Win; D = Draw; L = Loss

==== Fixtures ====
19 August 2023 1	Anorthosis Famagusta	3–1	Ethnikos Achna	Larnaca
20:00 EEST (UTC+3)	Guerrero 62'; Castel 65', 85'	Report	Pechlivanis 89'	Stadium: Antonis Papadopoulos Stadium; Attendance: 7,350; Referee: Marios Christoforou

26 August 2023 2	Othellos Athienou	0–2	Anorthosis Famagusta	Larnaca
20:00 EEST (UTC+3)	Anang (yellow card) 68'	Report	Guerrero 19' (pen.); Tejera (yellow card) 53'; Ferreira (yellow card) 60', (goal) 89'	Stadium: Ammochostos Stadium; Referee: Dimitris Solomou

1 September 2023 3	Anorthosis Famagusta	2–2	Nea Salamina	Larnaca
20:00 EEST (UTC+3)	Ioannou (yellow card) 44'; Chico 45+2'; Guerrero 50'; Correa (red card) 55'; Ferreira (yellow card) 83'; Arboleda (yellow card) 90+5'; Thioune (yellow card) 90+7'	Report	Bejarano (yellow card) 7'; Melissas (yellow card) 42'; Katsiaris 52'; Miguelito (yellow card) 70'; Christodoulou (yellow card) 90+4'; Dorregaray (yellow card) 90+7'; Miguelito 90+13'	Stadium: Antonis Papadopoulos Stadium; Referee: Constantinos Fellas

17 September 2023 4	Karmiotissa Polemidion	1–3	Anorthosis Famagusta	Pafos
18:00 EEST (UTC+3)	Panteli (yellow card) 7'; Malone (yellow card) 55'; Katsantonis 77'	Report	Ferrer 21'; Kargas (yellow card) 42'; Guerrero 53'; Castel 90+5'	Stadium: Stelios Kyriakides Stadium

23 September 2023 5	Anorthosis Famagusta	1–1	APOEL	Larnaca
20:30 EEST (UTC+3)	Ferreira (yellow card) 41', (goal) 45+5'	Report	Villafáñez (yellow card) 17'; Kvilitaia 21' (pen.)	Stadium: Antonis Papadopoulos Stadium; Attendance: Sold Out

1 October 2023 6	AEL Limassol	v	Anorthosis Famagusta	Limassol
19:00 EEST (UTC+3)				Stadium: Alphamega Stadium

8 October 2023 7	Anorthosis Famagusta	v	Aris Limassol	Larnaca
19:00 EEST (UTC+3)				Stadium: Antonis Papadopoulos Stadium

22 October 2023 8	Doxa Katokopia	v	Anorthosis Famagusta	Peristerona
19:00 EEST (UTC+3)				Stadium: Katokopia Stadium

29 October 2023 9	Anorthosis Famagusta	v	AEZ Zakakiou	Larnaca
19:00 EET (UTC+2)				Stadium: Antonis Papadopoulos Stadium

5 November 2023 10	Pafos FC	v	Anorthosis Famagusta	Pafos
18:00 EET (UTC+2)				Stadium: Stelios Kyriakides Stadium

10 November 2023 11	Anorthosis Famagusta	v	Omonia FC	Larnaca
19:00 EET (UTC+2)				Stadium: Antonis Papadopoulos Stadium

26 November 2023 12	Apollon Limassol	v	Anorthosis Famagusta	Limassol
19:00 EET (UTC+2)				Stadium: Alphamega Stadium

2 December 2023 13	Anorthosis Famagusta	v	AEK Larnaca	Larnaca
19:00 EET (UTC+2)				Stadium: Antonis Papadopoulos Stadium

10 December 2023 14	Ethnikos Achna	v	Anorthosis Famagusta	Dasaki Achnas
17:00 EET (UTC+2)				Stadium: Dasaki Stadium

16 December 2023 15	Anorthosis Famagusta	v	Othellos Athienou	Larnaca
19:00 EET (UTC+2)				Stadium: Antonis Papadopoulos Stadium

23 December 2023 16	Nea Salamina	v	Anorthosis Famagusta	Larnaca
19:00 EET (UTC+2)				Stadium: Ammochostos Stadium

2 January 2024 17	Anorthosis Famagusta	v	Karmiotissa Polemidion	Larnaca
19:00 EET (UTC+2)				Stadium: Antonis Papadopoulos Stadium

06.01.2024 – 07.01.2024 18	APOEL	v	Anorthosis Famagusta	Nicosia
00:00 EET (UTC+2)				Stadium: GSP Stadium

13.01.2024 – 14.01.2024 19	Anorthosis Famagusta	v	AEL Limassol	Larnaca
00:00 EET (UTC+2)				Stadium: Antonis Papadopoulos Stadium

20.01.2024 – 21.01.2024 20	Aris Limassol	v	Anorthosis Famagusta	Limassol
00:00 EET (UTC+2)				Stadium: Alphamega Stadium

27.01.2024 – 28.01.2024 21	Anorthosis Famagusta	v	Doxa Katokopias	Larnaca
00:00 EET (UTC+2)				Stadium: Antonis Papadopoulos Stadium

30.01.2024 – 31.01.2024 22	AEZ Zakakiou	v	Anorthosis Famagusta	Larnaca
00:00 EET (UTC+2)				Stadium: Ammochostos Stadium

03.02.2024 – 04.02.2024 23	Anorthosis Famagusta	v	Pafos FC	Larnaca
00:00 EET (UTC+2)				Stadium: Antonis Papadopoulos Stadium

10.02.2024 – 11.02.2024 24	Omonia FC	v	Anorthosis Famagusta	Nicosia
00:00 EET (UTC+2)				Stadium: GSP Stadium

17.02.2024 – 18.02.2024 25	Anorthosis Famagusta	v	Apollon Limassol	Larnaca
00:00 EET (UTC+2)				Stadium: Antonis Papadopoulos Stadium

24.02.2024 – 25.02.2024 26	AEK Larnaca	v	Anorthosis Famagusta	Larnaca
00:00 EET (UTC+2)				Stadium: AEK Arena

== Statistics ==
=== Squad statistics ===
As of 23 September 2023

No.	Pos	Player	League		Play-offs		Cup		Total	
No.	Pos	Player	Apps	Goals	Apps	Goals	Apps	Goals	Apps	Goals
Goalkeepers
1	GK	(Colombia) Iván Arboleda	3	0	0	0	0	0	3	0
51	GK	(Cyprus) Anastasios Pishias	0	0	0	0	0	0	0	0
93	GK	(Cyprus) Neofytos Michael	2	0	0	0	0	0	2	0
99	GK	(Cyprus) Andreas Keravnos	0	0	0	0	0	0	0	0
Defenders
2	DF	(Senegal) Moussa Wagué	5	0	0	0	0	0	5	0
3	DF	(Spain) Fran García	2	0	0	0	0	0	2	0
5	DF	(Morocco) Nabil Marmouk	3	0	0	0	0	0	3	0
6	DF	(Greece) Giannis Kargas	2	0	0	0	0	0	2	0
7	DF	(Cyprus) Anderson Correia	4	0	0	0	0	0	4	0
15	DF	(Spain) Salva Ferrer	2	1	0	0	0	0	2	1
22	DF	(Cyprus) Minas Antoniou	1	0	0	0	0	0	1	0
23	DF	(Portugal) Kiko	0	0	0	0	0	0	0	0
44	DF	(Cyprus) Pavlos Correa	3	0	0	0	0	0	3	0
Midfielders
4	MF	(Cyprus) Kostakis Artymatas	0	0	0	0	0	0	0	0
8	MF	(Spain) Sergio Tejera	5	0	0	0	0	0	5	0
10	MF	(Spain) Miguel Ángel Guerrero	5	4	0	0	0	0	5	4
11	MF	(Portugal) Hélder Ferreira	5	2	0	0	0	0	5	2
12	MF	(Senegal) Ousseynou Thioune	4	0	0	0	0	0	4	0
17	MF	(Cyprus) Daniil Paroutis	4	0	0	0	0	0	4	0
18	MF	(Cyprus) Stephanos Charalambous	2	0	0	0	0	0	2	0
25	MF	(Slovakia) Erik Sabo	0	0	0	0	0	0	0	0
48	MF	(Cyprus) Michalis Ioannou	5	0	0	0	0	0	5	0
52	MF	(Cyprus) Konstantinos Konstantinou	0	0	0	0	0	0	0	0
81	FW	(Angola) Chico Banza	4	1	0	0	0	0	4	1
88	MF	(Cyprus) Andreas Chrysostomou	0	0	0	0	0	0	0	0
Forwards
9	FW	(Spain) Sergio Castel	5	3	0	0	0	0	5	3
20	FW	(Ghana) Majeed Waris	5	0	0	0	0	0	5	0
21	FW	(Senegal) Sekou Gassama	2	0	0	0	0	0	2	0
50	FW	(Cyprus) Dimitrianos Juliou	0	0	0	0	0	0	0	0

=== Disciplinary record ===
As of 23 September 2023

N	P	Nat.	Name	League			Play-offs			Cup			Other			Total			Notes
N	P	Nat.	Name	Yellow card	Second yellow card	Red card	Yellow card	Second yellow card	Red card	Yellow card	Second yellow card	Red card	Yellow card	Second yellow card	Red card	Yellow card	Second yellow card	Red card	Notes
Goalkeepers
1	GK	(Colombia)	Iván Arboleda	1												1			
51	GK	(Cyprus)	Anastasios Pishias																
93	GK	(Cyprus)	Neofytos Michael																
99	GK	(Cyprus)	Andreas Keravnos																
Defenders
2	DF	(Senegal)	Moussa Wagué																
3	DF	(Spain)	Fran García																
5	DF	(Morocco)	Nabil Marmouk																
6	DF	(Greece)	Giannis Kargas	1												1			
7	DF	(Cyprus)	Anderson Correia																
15	DF	(Spain)	Salva Ferrer																
22	DF	(Cyprus)	Minas Antoniou																
23	DF	(Portugal)	Kiko																
44	DF	(Cyprus)	Pavlos Correa			1												1	
Midfielders
4	MF	(Cyprus)	Kostakis Artymatas																
8	MF	(Spain)	Sergio Tejera	1												1			
10	MF	(Spain)	Miguel Ángel Guerrero																
11	MF	(Portugal)	Hélder Ferreira	3												3			
12	MF	(Senegal)	Ousseynou Thioune	1												1			
17	MF	(Cyprus)	Daniil Paroutis																
18	MF	(Cyprus)	Stephanos Charalambous																
25	MF	(Slovakia)	Erik Sabo																
48	MF	(Cyprus)	Michalis Ioannou	1												1			
52	MF	(Cyprus)	Konstantinos Konstantinou																
81	MF	(Angola)	Chico Banza																
88	MF	(Cyprus)	Andreas Chrysostomou																
Forwards
9	FW	(Spain)	Sergio Castel																
20	FW	(Ghana)	Majeed Waris																
21	FW	(Senegal)	Sekou Gassama																
50	FW	(Cyprus)	Dimitrianos Juliou																

=== Goalscorers ===
Includes all competitive matches. The list is sorted alphabetically by surname when total goals are equal.

Rank	No.	Pos.	Player	League	Play-offs	Cup	Total
1	10	AM	Miguel Angel Guerrero	3	0	0	3
2	9	FW	Sergio Castel	2	0	0	2
3	11	RW	Hélder Ferreira	1	0	0	1
4	81	LW	Chico Banza	1	0	0	1
