= 2021 Cypriot Super Cup =

Super Cup 2021
- Event: Cypriot Super Cup
AC Omonia	Anorthosis Famagusta
1	1
- Omonia won 3–2 on penalties.
- Date: 13 July 2021
- Venue: GSP Stadium, Nicosia, Cyprus
- Referee: Timotheos Christofi
- Attendance: 4700

The 2021 Cypriot Super Cup was the 51st edition of Cypriot Super Cup, an annual football match played between 2020-21 Cypriot champions, Omonia, and 2020-21 cup winners, Anorthosis Famagusta FC. The game was held at the GSP Stadium in Nicosia. Omonia won 3-2 on penalties, after a 1–1 draw. The game was broadcast by Alpha TV Cyprus.

== Match ==
=== Details ===
13 July 2021
21:00 EEST

Omonia	1–1	Anorthosis
Marko Šćepović 13'	Report; Report; Report	44' Andreas Chrysostomou
Penalties
Jordi Gómez (penalty missed) Marko Šćepović (penalty scored); Éric Bauthéac (penalty scored); Jan Lecjaks (penalty missed) Andronikos Kakoullis (penalty scored)	3–2	(penalty missed) Nikos Kaltsas (penalty scored) Andronikos Kakoullis; (penalty missed) Andreas Avraam; (penalty scored) Demetris Christofi (penalty missed) Kyle Lafferty

GSP Stadium, Nicosia
Attendance: 4700
Referee: Timotheos Christofi

GK	40	(Brazil) Fabiano Freitas
DF	22	(Hungary) Ádám Lang
DF	15	(Slovakia) Tomáš Hubočan
DF	17	(Czech Republic) Jan Lecjaks
MF	4	(Nigeria) Shehu Abdullahi
MF	76	(Cyprus) Charalambos Charalambous		(substituted off) 69'
MF	16	(Spain) Jordi Gómez
MF	11	(France) Éric Bauthéac
FW	13	(Greece) Fotis Papoulis		(substituted off) 77'
FW	18	(Slovakia) Michal Ďuriš		(substituted off) 77'
FW	44	(Serbia) Marko Šćepović	(yellow card) 91'
Αλλαγές:
DF	2	(Cyprus) Paris Psaltis		(substituted in) 69'
MF	79	(Cyprus) Andreas Savva		(substituted in) 77'
FW	80	(Cyprus) Andronikos Kakoullis		(substituted in) 77'
Manager:
(Norway) Henning Berg

GK	1	(Georgia (country)) Giorgi Loria
DF	19	(Armenia) Hovhannes Hambardzumyan	(yellow card) 91'
DF	7	(Brazil) Anderson Correia
DF	3	(Cyprus) Marios Antoniades
DF	44	(Cyprus) Pavlos Correa	(yellow card) 56'
MF	48	(Cyprus) Michalis Ioannou	(yellow card) 89'
MF	25	(Czech Republic) Pavlos Correa		(substituted off) 78'
MF	88	(Cyprus) Andreas Chrysostomou
MF	70	(Serbia) Miloš Deletić		(substituted off) 66'
FW	8	(Cyprus) Onisiforos Roushias		(substituted off) 63'
FW	9	(Northern Ireland) Kyle Lafferty	(yellow card) 64'
Αλλαγές:
FW	77	(Cyprus) Demetris Christofi		(substituted in) 63'
FW	20	(Cyprus) Nikos Kaltsas		(substituted in) 66'
MF	11	(Cyprus) Andreas Avraam		(substituted in) 78'
Manager:
(Georgia (country)) Temur Ketsbaia

Assistant referees:
Michales Sotiriou
Pavlos Georgiou
Fourth official:
Chirosovalantis Theouli
VAR:
Vasilis Demetriou
AVAR:
Nikos Egglezou
Observer:
Panayiotis Yerasimoy

Match rules

- 90 minutes.
- Penalty shoot-out if scores still level.
- Seven named substitutes, of which up to three may be used.

== Sources ==
- "Προκήρυξη Super Cup 2018-2023" (PDF) (in Greek). Cyprus Football Association. 2018-10-24. Archived from the original (PDF) on 2021-07-12.
