= Pavlos Korrea =

Cypriot footballer

Personal information
- Date of birth: 14 July 1998 (age 28)
- Place of birth: Paphos, Cyprus
- Height: 1.86 m (6 ft 1 in)
- Position: Centre-back

Team information
- Current team: Nyíregyháza Spartacus
- Number: 44

Youth career
- 2014–2017: Anorthosis Famagusta

Senior career*
Years	Team	Apps	(Gls)
2017–2024	Anorthosis Famagusta	83	(2)
2018–2019	→ Aris Limassol (loan)	16	(1)
2020	→ Ethnikos Achna (loan)	5	(0)
2024–2025	Volos	11	(0)
2025–	Nyíregyháza Spartacus	20	(0)

International career^{‡}
2017	Cyprus U19	1	(0)
2019–2020	Cyprus U21	8	(0)
2022–	Cyprus	3	(0)
- * Club domestic league appearances and goals as of 30 May 2026 ‡ National team caps and goals as of 30 December 2023

Pavlos Korrea (Greek: Παύλος Κορρέα; born 14 July 1998) is a Cypriot professional footballer who plays as a centre-back for Hungarian NB I club Nyíregyháza Spartacus.

== Club career ==
=== Early career ===
Born in Paphos, Cyprus, Korrea grew up in the Anorthosis Famagusta Football Academy. On 20 May 2017 was given his Cypriot First Division debut by head coach Ronny Levy, in a 0–1 defeat match against AEK Larnaca. On 22 June 2020, Anorthosis announced the renewal of Korrea's contract until 2023. On 27 May 2022, Korrea signed another extension of his contract, running until the summer of 2024.

==== Loan to Aris Limassol ====
On 1 July 2018, Korrea joined Aris Limassol on loan until the end of the season. He plays with Aris Limassol for 16 games and scores 1 goal.

==== Loan to Ethnikos Achna ====
On 24 January 2020, Korrea joined Ethnikos Achna on loan until the end of the season. He played with Ethnikos Achna for 5 games.

== International career ==
Korrea was born in Cyprus to a Panamanian father and Greek mother. He is a youth international for Cyprus. He made his full international debut for Cyprus on 5 June 2022, in a UEFA Nations League match against Northern Ireland at AEK Arena.

== Career statistics ==
As of match played 1 September 2023

Appearances and goals by club, season and competition
Club	Season	League			National Cup		Europe		Other		Total	
Club	Season	Division	Apps	Goals	Apps	Goals	Apps	Goals	Apps	Goals	Apps	Goals
Anorthosis	2016–17	Cyta Championship	1	0	—		—		—		1	0
Anorthosis	2017–18	Cyta Championship	—		—		—		—		—	
Anorthosis	2019–20	Cyta Championship	—		—		—		—		—	
Anorthosis	2020–21	Cyta Championship	11	1	3	2	—		—		14	3
Anorthosis	2021–22	Cyta Championship	24	1	7	0	6	0	—		37	1
Anorthosis	2022–23	Cyta Championship	26	0	2	0	—		—		28	0
Anorthosis	2023–24	Cyta Championship	3	0	0	0	—		—		3	0
Anorthosis	Total		65	2	12	2	6	0	—		83	4
Aris Limassol (loan)	2018–19	Cypriot Second Division	16	1	2	0	—		—		18	1
Ethnikos Achna (loan)	2019–20	Cyta Championship	5	0	3	0	—		—		8	0
Career total			86	3	17	2	6	0	0	0	109	5

== Honours ==
Anorthosis

- Cypriot Cup: 2020–21
