= Stefanos Charalampous =

Cypriot footballer (born 1999)

Personal information
- Full name: Stefanos Charalampous
- Date of birth: September 3, 1999 (age 27)
- Place of birth: Paphos, Cyprus
- Height: 1.75 m (5 ft 9 in)
- Position: Attacking midfielder

Team information
- Current team: Anorthosis Famagusta
- Number: 18

Youth career
- —2010: Akritas Chlorakas
- 2010—2015: Arsenal Elite Academy
- 2015—2018: Sporting Lokeren
- 2018: Doxa Katokopias

Senior career*
Years	Team	Apps	(Gls)
2018–2020	Doxa Katokopias	10	(0)
2018–2019	PAEEK (loan)	20	(2)
2019–2020	Digenis Morphou (loan)	12	(0)
2020–2023	Olympiakos Nicosia	44	(3)
2023–	Anorthosis Famagusta	23	(0)
2024	→ Karmiotissa (loan)	15	(0)
2025–2026	→ Olympiakos Nicosia (loan)	8	(1)

International career^{‡}
2020–	Cyprus U21	1	(0)
- * Club domestic league appearances and goals as of 08:05, 18 January 2026 (UTC) ‡ National team caps and goals as of 15 June 2023

Stefanos Charalampous (Greek: Στέφανος Χαραλάμπους; born 3 September 1999) is a Cypriot professional footballer who plays as an attacking midfielder for Cypriot First Division club Anorthosis Famagusta.

He has previously played for Doxa Katokopias, PAEEK, Digenis Morphou and Olympiakos Nicosia.

== Career ==
Charalampous was born on September 3, 1999, in Paphos, Cyprus. His father is former player Pambos Charalampous. He started his youth career at the age of 5 as a member of Akritas Chloraka academy. He entered Arsenal's elite academy which is established in Greece at the age of 11. They came to Cyprus among other countries and they chose him. He got the scholarship and for four years he was enclosed in the academy with a private school. In the fifth year he was going back and forth between Greece - England with the aim of winning a contract with the team, but he was not given the chance. Then at 16 he went for a year to Belgian side Sporting Lokeren, however it was not as he imagined it. He did not take the opportunities and decided to return to Cyprus. He signed a contract with Doxa Katokopia, played in 10 games in the first year, but in the next two seasons he was loaned to PAEEK and Digenis Morphou.

=== Doxa Katokopia ===
On 15 January 2018, Charalampous signed a contract with Cypriot First Division club, Doxa Katokopia. He plays with Doxa for 10 games.

==== Loan to PAEEK and Digenis Morphou ====
On 12 September 2018, it was officially announced that Charalampous loaned until the end of the season at PAEEK. On 29 August 2019 loaned at Digenis Morphou until the end of the season.

=== Olympiakos Nicosia ===
Charalampous joined Olympiakos Nicosia in the summer of 2020, after passing the tryouts of Giannis Petrakis. He made his debut on January 7, 2021, against Pafos FC, while on April 14, 2021, in a cup game against AEL Limassol he was the first substitute and after a good performance he scored his first goal. He played for 44 games and scores 3 goals.

=== Anorthosis Famagusta ===
On June 24, 2023, it was officially announced that Charalampous had signed with Anorthosis Famagusta. The agreement will be activated after the medical examinations. The exceptional performances of the 23-year-old Cypriot midfielder for Olympiakos Nicosia made Anorthosis to bring him to Antonis Papadopoulos on a free transfer. Charalampous will be Anorthosis' second signing for the 2023–24 season, after the Spanish left-back Fran Garcia Solsona. The Cypriot midfielder was a big star in last season's first quarter-final cup match at Makario Stadium on 16 February, scoring two goals in Olympiacos' 2–1 win over "lady". On 7 July 2023, Anorthosis announced the formalization of the agreement with Charalampous until 2025.

== Personal life ==
Charalampous is the son of the Cypriot former footballer Pambos Charalampous who played for Evagoras, AEP and Apollon Limassol. And he is the younger brother of Cypriot actress, Antonia Charalampous.

== Career statistics ==
As of match played 19 August 2023

Appearances and goals by club, season and competition
Club	Season	League			National Cup		Europe		Other		Total	
Club	Season	Division	Apps	Goals	Apps	Goals	Apps	Goals	Apps	Goals	Apps	Goals
Doxa Katokopias	2017–18	Cyta Championship	10	0	0	0	—		—		10	0
PAEEK (loan)	2018–19	Cypriot Second Division	20	2	0	0	—		—		20	2
Digenis Morphou (loan)	2019–20	Cypriot Second Division	12	0	2	0	—		—		14	0
Olympiakos Nicosia	2020–21	Cyta Championship	8	1	4	1	—		—		12	2
Olympiakos Nicosia	2021–22	Cyta Championship	20	1	1	0	—		—		21	1
Olympiakos Nicosia	2022–23	Cyta Championship	16	1	3	2	—		—		19	3
Olympiakos Nicosia	Subtotal		44	3	8	3	—		—		52	6
Anorthosis	2023–24	Cyta Championship	3	0	0	0	—		—		3	0
Career total			89	5	12	3	0	0	0	0	101	8

Olympiakos Nicosia

- Cypriot Cup: Runner-Up 2020–21
