= Andreas Chrysostomou =

Cypriot professional footballer (born 2001)

Personal information
- Date of birth: 14 January 2001 (age 25)
- Place of birth: Nicosia, Cyprus
- Height: 1.80 m (5 ft 11 in)
- Position: Central midfielder

Team information
- Current team: Anorthosis Famagusta
- Number: 88

Youth career
- –2018: Anorthosis Famagusta
- 2018–2019: Inter Milan
- 2019–2020: Sampdoria

Senior career*
Years	Team	Apps	(Gls)
2020–	Anorthosis Famagusta	87	(8)

International career^{‡}
2016–2018	Cyprus U17	5	(0)
2019	Cyprus U19	1	(0)
2021	Cyprus U21	4	(0)
2024–	Cyprus	3	(0)
- * Club domestic league appearances and goals as of 14 June 2026 ‡ National team caps and goals as of 12 June 2024

Andreas Chrysostomou (Greek: Ανδρέας Χρυσοστόμου; born 14 January 2001) is a Cypriot professional footballer who plays as a central midfielder for Cypriot First Division club Anorthosis Famagusta and the Cyprus national team.

== Club career ==
Chrysostomou was born on 14 January 2001 in Nicosia, Cyprus. He started his youth career at the age of 5 as a member of Anorthosis Famagusta academy. During his time in the Anorthosis Academies, he showed his talent, and was acquired by Inter Milan, where he played for Inter Milan's U17 and U19 teams, and also played for Sampdoria's U19. After his stint in Italian clubs, he returned to Cyprus and the team where he was promoted.

=== Anorthosis Famagusta ===
Chrysostomou made his debut for Anorthosis in a Cypriot Super Cup match against Omonia on 13 July 2021, he scored the only goal for his team.

On 14 January 2022, Anorthosis announced the renewal of Chrysostomou contract until 2025.

== International career ==
Chrysostomou made his debut for the senior Cyprus national team on 25 March 2024 in a friendly against Serbia.

== Personal life ==
Chrysostomou's father, "Tomis", spoke to Super Sport FM 104.0's "Eisai Offside" show, about the young talents in Cyprus and among other things he referred to his son's experience abroad and the difficulties he encountered in Italy when he made the decision to wear the Inter jersey.

"It takes a lot of sacrifices from the youngsters. I speak from experience having seen what Andreas went through. He left Cyprus as a youngster, at the age of 15. He went to Inter and stayed there until he was 19-20. We were deprived of him at a difficult age. He went to a foreign country, there was a lot of racism because you can understand how they felt when they saw someone coming from abroad to take their place. Andreas experienced racism, but he fought it, he didn't give up. Let me give you the simple example of Italians not speaking English to him only Italian, so he had to learn the language. It was very difficult. Andreas took the hardest way to play football," he said.

And after a question, he replied, "Definitely the fact that he trained with Inter's first team helped him. He experienced things that we unfortunately didn't have here in Cyprus as academies. When the academy alone has a budget of 12 million euros, you can see the difference with the Cypriot academies where we were running around trying to find stadiums".

== Career statistics ==
As of match played 19 April 2023

Club	Season	League			National Cup		Europe		Other		Total	
Club	Season	Division	Apps	Goals	Apps	Goals	Apps	Goals	Apps	Goals	Apps	Goals
Anorthosis	2020–21	Cyta Championship	—		1	0	—		—		1	0
Anorthosis	2021–22	Cyta Championship	19	2	4	0	4 (Note: Appearance in UEFA Europa League, three appearances in UEFA Conference League)	0	1 (Note: Appearance in Cypriot Super Cup)	1	28	3
Anorthosis	2022–23	Cyta Championship	11	1	1	0	—		—		11	1
Anorthosis	Total		30	3	5	0	4	0	1	1	40	3
Career total			30	3	5	0	4	0	1	1	40	4

== Honours ==
=== Club ===
Anorthosis

- Cypriot Cup
  - Winner: 2020–21
