= Shehu Abdullahi =

Nigerian professional footballer

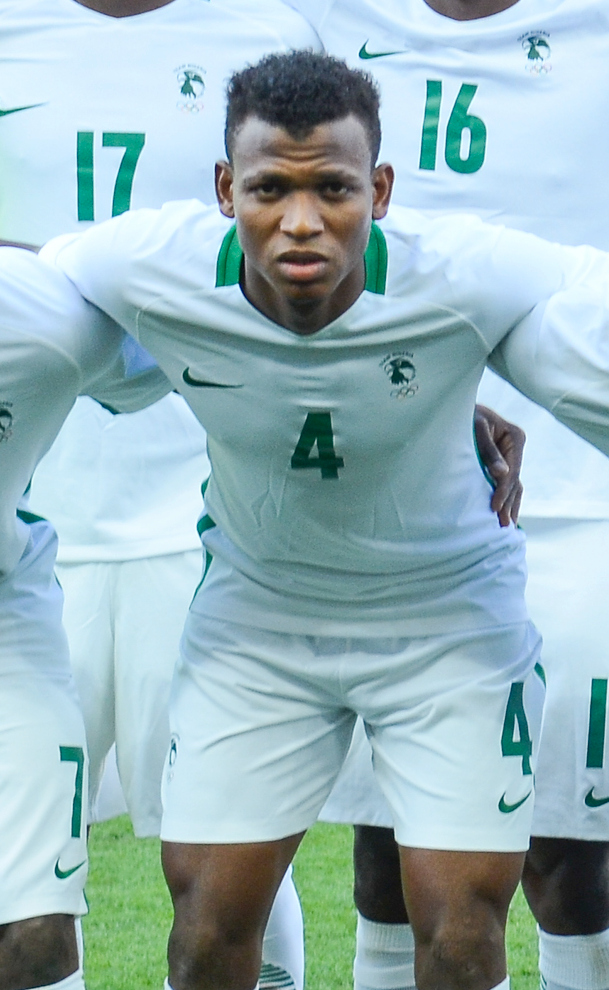
- Shehu with Nigeria in 2016

Personal information
- Full name: Shehu Usman Abdullahi
- Date of birth: 12 March 1993 (age 33)
- Place of birth: Sokoto, Nigeria
- Height: 1.82 m (6 ft 0 in)
- Positions: Defensive midfielder; defender

Youth career
- 2011: Plateau United

Senior career*
Years	Team	Apps	(Gls)
2012–2014	Kano Pillars	?	(?)
2014–2015	Qadsia	7	(1)
2015–2016	União da Madeira	28	(1)
2016–2018	Anorthosis	48	(3)
2018–2020	Bursaspor	60	(5)
2020–2022	Omonia	50	(0)
2022	Levski Sofia	8	(0)
2024–2026	Kano Pillars	9	(0)

International career^{‡}
2013	Nigeria U20	4	(0)
2013	Nigeria U21	2	(0)
2014–2022	Nigeria	37	(0)
2016	Nigeria Olympic	5	(0)
Medal record
Olympic Games
Bronze medal – third place	2016 Rio de Janeiro	Team
Africa Cup of Nations
Third place	2019 Egypt
- * Club domestic league appearances and goals as of 11 May 2025 ‡ National team caps and goals as of 13:30, 16 July 2019 (UTC)

Shehu Usman Abdullahi (born 12 March 1993) is a Nigerian former professional footballer who played as a defensive midfielder and defender.

== Club career ==
=== Qadsia SC ===
In July 2014, Abdullahi moved from Kano Pillars to Kuwait Premier League side Qadsia SC in a deal worth $480,000, of which Abdullahi received $330,000 and Kano Pillars $150,000.

=== União da Madeira ===
On 6 June 2015, Shehu joined newly promoted Primeira Liga side C.F. União on a two-year deal.

=== Anorthosis Famagusta ===
On 2 September 2016, Shehu joined Cypriot side Anorthosis Famagusta on a two-year deal worth for the 20% of the player re-sale fee in other European club.

=== Bursaspor ===
On 24 January 2018, Shehu signed for two and a half years Turkish side Bursaspor for an undisclosed fee.

=== Omonia ===
On 19 September 2020, Shehu signed for the Cyprus First Division side Omonia.

=== Levski Sofia ===
On 16 September 2022, Shehu signed with Bulgarian First League club Levski Sofia until the end of the 2022–23 season.

== International career ==
In January 2014, coach Stephen Keshi, invited him to be included in the Nigeria 23-man team for the 2014 African Nations Championship. Shehu earned his first cap on 11 January 2014, in the 1:2 loss against Mali, appearing as a substitute. He helped Nigeria defeat Zimbabwe for a third-place finish by a goal to nil.

He was included in the Nigeria 35-man provisional team for the 2016 Summer Olympics.

In May 2018 he was named in the Nigeria preliminary 30-man team for the 2018 FIFA World Cup, in Russia.

== Career statistics ==
=== Club ===
As of 13 June 2022

Club	Season	League			National Cup		League Cup		Continental		Other		Total	
Club	Season	Division	Apps	Goals	Apps	Goals	Apps	Goals	Apps	Goals	Apps	Goals	Apps	Goals
União da Madeira	2015–16	Primeira Liga	28	1	1	0	1	0	—		—		30	1
Anorthosis	2016–17	Cypriot First Division	29	2	6	1	—		—		—		35	2
Anorthosis	2017–18	Cypriot First Division	19	1	2	0	—		—		—		21	1
Anorthosis	Total		48	3	8	1	—		—		—		56	4
Bursaspor	2017–18	Süper Lig	14	0	—		—		—		—		14	0
Bursaspor	2018–19	Süper Lig	13	1	—		—		—		—		13	1
Bursaspor	2019–20	1. Lig	33	4	0	0	—		—		—		33	4
Bursaspor	Total		60	5	0	0	—		—		—		60	5
Omonia	2020–21	Cypriot First Division	30	0	1	0	—		4	0	—		35	0
Omonia	2021–22	Cypriot First Division	20	0	3	0	—		9	0	1	0	33	0
Omonia	Total		50	0	4	0	—		13	0	1	0	68	0
Career total			186	9	13	1	1	0	13	0	1	0	214	10

=== International ===
As of match played 16 July 2019

Nigeria
Year	Apps	Goals
2014	6	0
2015	4	0
2016	6	0
2017	6	0
2018	6	0
2019	3	0
Total	31	0

== Honours ==
=== Club ===
Qadsia

- Kuwait Emir Cup: 2014–15
- Kuwait Super Cup: 2014
- AFC Cup: 2014

Omonia

- Cypriot First Division: 2020–21
- Cypriot Cup: 2021–22
- Cypriot Super Cup: 2021

=== International ===
Nigeria U23

- African Games bronze medal: 2015

Nigeria Olympic team

- Summer Olympics bronze medal: 2016
