= Daniil Paroutis =

Cypriot footballer (born 2001)

Personal information
- Full name: Daniil Paroutis
- Date of birth: 2 January 2001 (age 25)
- Place of birth: Limassol, Cyprus
- Height: 1.79 m (5 ft 10 in)
- Position: Winger

Team information
- Current team: AEL Limassol
- Number: 17

Youth career
- 2015: Twente
- 2015–2016: Panathinaikos
- 2016–2017: Anorthosis Famagusta
- 2017–2019: Novara

Senior career*
Years	Team	Apps	(Gls)
2019–2020	Novara	0	(0)
2020–2025	Anorthosis Famagusta	82	(4)
2021–2022	→ Ermis Aradippou (loan)	28	(9)
2026–	AEL Limassol	21	(2)

International career^{‡}
2017–2018	Cyprus U17	9	(5)
2018–	Cyprus U19	13	(1)
- * Club domestic league appearances and goals as of 7 November 2026 ‡ National team caps and goals as of 30 June 2022 (UTC)

Daniil Paroutis (Greek: Δανιήλ Παρούτης; born 2 January 2001) is a Cypriot professional footballer who plays for AEL Limassol.

Paroutis with a presence at the Anorthosis academies who was born in Limassol. In addition to Anorthosis, to which he returned in the summer of 2020, he was also present in foreign clubs such as FC Twente, Panathinaikos and Novara. He mainly plays as a winger.

== Club career ==
=== Anorthosis Famagusta ===
On 27 August 2020, Paroutis signed with Cypriot First Division club Anorthosis Famagusta. Paroutis made his debut for Anorthosis in a cup match against Karmiotissa and he scored.

=== Loan to Ermis Aradippou ===
On 2 September 2021, Paroutis joined Ermis on loan until the end of the season. He played for Ermis 28 games and scored 9 goals.

== Career statistics ==
As of match played 26 August 2023

Appearances and goals by club, season and competition
Club	Season	League			National Cup		Europe		Other		Total	
Club	Season	Division	Apps	Goals	Apps	Goals	Apps	Goals	Apps	Goals	Apps	Goals
Novara	2019–20	Serie C	0	0	1	0	—		—		1	0
Anorthosis	2020–21	Cyta Championship	0	0	1	1	—		—		1	1
Anorthosis	2022–23	Cyta Championship	21	2	3	0	—		—		24	2
Anorthosis	2023–24	Cyta Championship	2	0	0	0	—		—		2	0
Anorthosis	Total		23	2	4	1	—		—		27	3
Ermis Aradippou (Loan)	2021–22	Cypriot Second Division	28	9	2	0	—		—		30	9
Career total			51	11	7	1	0	0	0	0	58	12
