= Andreas Keravnos =

Cypriot footballer (born 1999)

Personal information
- Full name: Andreas Keravnos
- Date of birth: May 5, 1999 (age 27)
- Place of birth: Limassol, Cyprus
- Height: 1.90 m (6 ft 3 in)
- Position: Goalkeeper

Team information
- Current team: AEL Limassol
- Number: 99

Youth career
- –2017: AEL Limassol

Senior career*
Years	Team	Apps	(Gls)
2017–2022	AEL Limassol	12	(0)
2019–2020	→ AEZ Zakakiou (loan)	7	(0)
2022–2025	Anorthosis Famagusta	13	(0)
2025–2026	AEL Limassol	0	(0)
- * Club domestic league appearances and goals as of 17:01, 5 July 2025 (UTC)

Andreas Keravnos (Greek: Ανδρέας Κεραυνός, born 5 May 1999) is a retired Cypriot footballer who plays as a goalkeeper. He has previously played for Anorthosis Famagusta, AEZ Zakakiou and AEL Limassol.

== Club career ==
=== Early career ===
Born in Limassol, Cyprus, Keravnos grew up in the AEL Limassol Football Academy. On 5 May 2018 was given his Cypriot First Division debut by head coach Bruno Baltazar, in a 1–2 home defeat to APOEL.

==== Loan to AEZ Zakakiou ====
In August 2019, Keravnos joined AEZ Zakakiou on loan until the end of the season. He plays with AEZ Zakakiou for 7 games.

=== Anorthosis Famagusta ===
On 22 August 2022, Keravnos signed with Cypriot First Division club Anorthosis Famagusta on a three-year contract until the summer of 2025.

=== Return to AEL Limassol ===
On 5 July 2025, Keravnos returns to AEL Limassol signing a two-year contract.

== Career statistics ==
As of match played 19 May 2023

Appearances and goals by club, season and competition
Club	Season	League			National Cup		Europe		Other		Total	
Club	Season	Division	Apps	Goals	Apps	Goals	Apps	Goals	Apps	Goals	Apps	Goals
AEL Limassol	2015–16	Cyta Championship	—		—		—		—		—	
AEL Limassol	2016–17	Cyta Championship	—		—		—		—		—	
AEL Limassol	2017–18	Cyta Championship	2	0	—		—		—		2	0
AEL Limassol	2018–19	Cyta Championship	—		2	0	—		—		2	0
AEL Limassol	2020–21	Cyta Championship	2	0	—		—		—		2	0
AEL Limassol	2021–22	Cyta Championship	7	0	—		—		—		7	0
AEL Limassol	Subtotal		11	0	2	0	—		—		13	0
AEZ Zakakiou (loan)	2019–20	Cypriot Second Division	7	0	—		—		—		7	0
Anorthosis	2022–23	Cyta Championship	10	0	1	0	—		—		11	0
Career total			28	0	3	0	0	0	0	0	31	0
