= Michalis Ioannou =

Cypriot footballer

Personal information
- Full name: Michalis Ioannou
- Date of birth: 30 June 2000 (age 26)
- Place of birth: Larnaca, Cyprus
- Height: 1.81 m (5 ft 11 in)
- Position: Central midfielder

Team information
- Current team: Anorthosis Famagusta
- Number: 48

Youth career
- –2017: Anorthosis Famagusta

Senior career*
Years	Team	Apps	(Gls)
2017–	Anorthosis Famagusta	118	(2)
2020–2021	→ Roda (loan)	17	(0)

International career^{‡}
2016–2017	Cyprus U17	11	(0)
2018–	Cyprus U19	14	(1)
2019–	Cyprus	6	(0)
- * Club domestic league appearances and goals as of 14 June 2026 ‡ National team caps and goals as of 1 December 2023

Michalis Ioannou (Greek: Μιχάλης Ιωάννου; born 30 June 2000) is a Greek Cypriot professional footballer who plays as a central midfielder for Cypriot First Division club Anorthosis Famagusta. A product of Anorthosis Famagusta's football academy, Ioannou represented his country at various age groups before making his international debut for the Cyprus national team in 2019.

== Club career ==
=== Anorthosis ===
Ioannou made his debut for Anorthosis in a match against AEK Larnaca.

On 6 April 2019, he signed his first professional contract with Anorthosis until 2023.

On 11 December 2019, Anorthosis increased its purchase clause from 200 to 610 thousand euros.

==== Loan to Roda JC ====
On 11 August 2020, Ioannou joined Roda on loan until the end of the season.

== International career ==
Ioannou made his Cyprus national team debut on 8 June 2019 in a Euro 2020 qualifier match against Scotland, at Hampden Park Stadium as a starter.

== International goals ==
No.	Date	Venue	Opponent	Score	Result	Competition
1.	20 November 2022	HaMoshava Stadium, Petah Tikva, Israel	Israel	3–2	3–2	Friendly

== Career statistics ==
As of match played 1 September 2023

Club	Season	League			National Cup		League Cup		Continental		Other		Total	
Club	Season	Division	Apps	Goals	Apps	Goals	Apps	Goals	Apps	Goals	Apps	Goals	Apps	Goals
Anorthosis	2016–17	Cyta Championship	1	0	—		—		—		—		1	0
Anorthosis	2017–18	Cyta Championship	1	0	—		—		—		—		1	0
Anorthosis	2018–19	Cyta Championship	15	0	—		—		—		—		15	0
Anorthosis	2019–20	Cyta Championship	8	0	3	0	—		—		—		11	0
Anorthosis	2021–22	Cyta Championship	20	0	4	0	—		5	0	1	0	30	0
Anorthosis	2022–23	Cyta Championship	28	0	3	0	—		—		—		31	0
Anorthosis	2023–24	Cyta Championship	3	0	0	0	—		—		—		3	0
Anorthosis	Total		76	0	10	0	—		5	0	1	0	92	0
Roda (loan)	2020–21	Eerste Divisie	17	0	1	0	—		—		—		18	0
Career total			93	0	11	0	0	0	5	0	1	0	110	0
