= Anderson Correia (footballer) =

Cypriot footballer (born 1991)

Personal information
- Full name: Anderson Correia de Barros
- Date of birth: 6 May 1991 (age 35)
- Place of birth: São Paulo, Brazil
- Height: 1.77 m (5 ft 10 in)
- Position: Left-back

Team information
- Current team: Aris Limassol
- Number: 7

Youth career
- 2009−2010: Santo André

Senior career*
Years	Team	Apps	(Gls)
2010–2011	Santo André	2	(0)
2011	→ Patrocinense (loan)	0	(0)
2012−2013	Paulista	17	(0)
2014	São Paulo (RS)	12	(0)
2014−2017	Boavista	30	(0)
2017−2020	Nea Salamina	87	(5)
2020–2024	Anorthosis Famagusta	131	(2)
2024–	Aris Limassol	63	(1)

International career^{‡}
2023–	Cyprus	21	(0)
- * Club domestic league appearances and goals as of 14 June 2026 ‡ National team caps and goals as of 12:00, 7 June 2026 (UTC)

Anderson Correia de Barros (born 6 May 1991), commonly known as Anderson Correia (Greek: Άντερσον Κορέια), is a professional footballer who plays as a left-back for Cypriot First Division club Aris Limassol. Born in Brazil, he represents Cyprus at international level.

== Career ==
Born in São Paulo, Correia career started in Esporte Clube Santo André, competing for the Ramalhão side for only two seasons, before moving on to the larger Paulista Futebol Clube in the Campeonato Paulista in another two-year spell.

He then passed through Campeonato Gáucho, playing for Sport Club São Paulo in Rio Grande do Sul in 2014.

=== Boavista ===
On 2 July 2014, Correia joined Boavista in the Portuguese league, signing a three-year deal with the Axadrezados. He made his professional debut on 17 August 2014, in a match against Braga.

=== Nea Salamina ===
On 15 June 2017, Correia joined Nea Salamina in the Cypriot First Division, signing a three-year deal until the summer of 2020.

=== Anorthosis Famagusta ===
On 19 June 2020, Anorthosis Famagusta announced that the Correia sign a three-year contract until the summer 2023.

On 30 December 2022, Correia extended his contract with Anorthosis for three-year, running until 31 May 2026.

On 1 June 2024, Correia left Anorthosis Famagusta and joined Aris Limassol as a free transfer.

== International career ==
In June 2023, after being awarded the country's citizenship, he was called up to the Cyprus national team by head coach Temur Ketsbaia, making his debut on 17 June 2023 in a 1–2 home defeat to Georgia for the UEFA Euro 2024 qualifying.

== Style of play ==
Correia is a physically strong defender known for his speed, technique and offensive capabilities. He is usually deployed as a left-back. He has been praised for his work ethic and defensive awareness. He has good dribbling skill and is noted for his involvement in counter-attacks.

== Career statistics ==
As of match played 11 November 2023

Appearances and goals by club, season and competition
Club	Season	League			National cup		League cup		Continental		Other		Total	
Club	Season	Division	Apps	Goals	Apps	Goals	Apps	Goals	Apps	Goals	Apps	Goals	Apps	Goals
Santo André	2010	Paulista A1	1	0	—		—		—		—		1	0
Santo André	2010	Série B	1	0	—		—		—		—		1	0
Santo André	Total		2	0	0	0	0	0	0	0	0	0	2	0
Patrocinense (loan)	2011	Módulo II	—		—		—		—		—		—	
Paulista	2012	Paulista A1	7	0	2	0	—		—		—		9	0
Paulista	2013	Paulista A1	10	0	—		—		—		—		10	0
Paulista	Total		17	0	2	0	0	0	0	0	0	0	19	0
Botafogo-SP	2013	Série D	1	0	—		—		—		—		1	0
São Paulo	2014	Gaúcho	12	0	—		—		—		—		12	0
Boavista	2014–15	Primeira Liga	11	0	—		—		—		—		11	0
Boavista	2015–16	Primeira Liga	15	0	2	0	—		—		—		17	0
Boavista	2016–17	Primeira Liga	4	0	—		1 (Note: Appearance in Taça da Liga)	0	—		—		5	0
Boavista	Total		30	0	2	0	1	0	0	0	0	0	33	0
Nea Salamina	2017–18	Cyta Championship	33	3	3	0	—		—		—		36	3
Nea Salamina	2018–19	Cyta Championship	31	1	2	0	—		—		—		33	1
Nea Salamina	2019–20	Cyta Championship	23	1	4	2	—		—		—		27	3
Nea Salamina	Total		87	5	9	2	0	0	0	0	0	0	96	7
Anorthosis	2020–21	Cyta Championship	34	0	5	0	—		1 (Note: Appearance in UEFA Europa League)	0	—		40	0
Anorthosis	2021–22	Cyta Championship	32	1	5	0	—		9 (Note: Two appearances in UEFA Europa League, seven appearances in UEFA Conference League)	0	1 (Note: Appearance in Cypriot Super Cup)	0	47	1
Anorthosis	2022–23	Cyta Championship	32	0	3	0	—		—		—		35	0
Anorthosis	2023–24	Cyta Championship	9	1	0	0	—		—		—		9	1
Anorthosis	Total		107	2	13	0	0	0	10	0	1	0	131	2
Career total			256	7	26	2	1	0	10	0	1	0	294	9

=== International ===
As of match played 7 June 2026

Appearances and goals by national team and year
National team	Year	Apps	Goals
Cyprus	2023	7	0
Cyprus	2024	5	0
Cyprus	2025	7	0
Cyprus	2026	2	0
Total		21	0

== Honours ==
Santo André

- Paulista A1 runner-up: 2010

Anorthosis

- Cypriot Cup: 2020–21
- Cypriot Super Cup runner-up: 2021
