= Sergio Castel =

Spanish association footballer (born 1995)

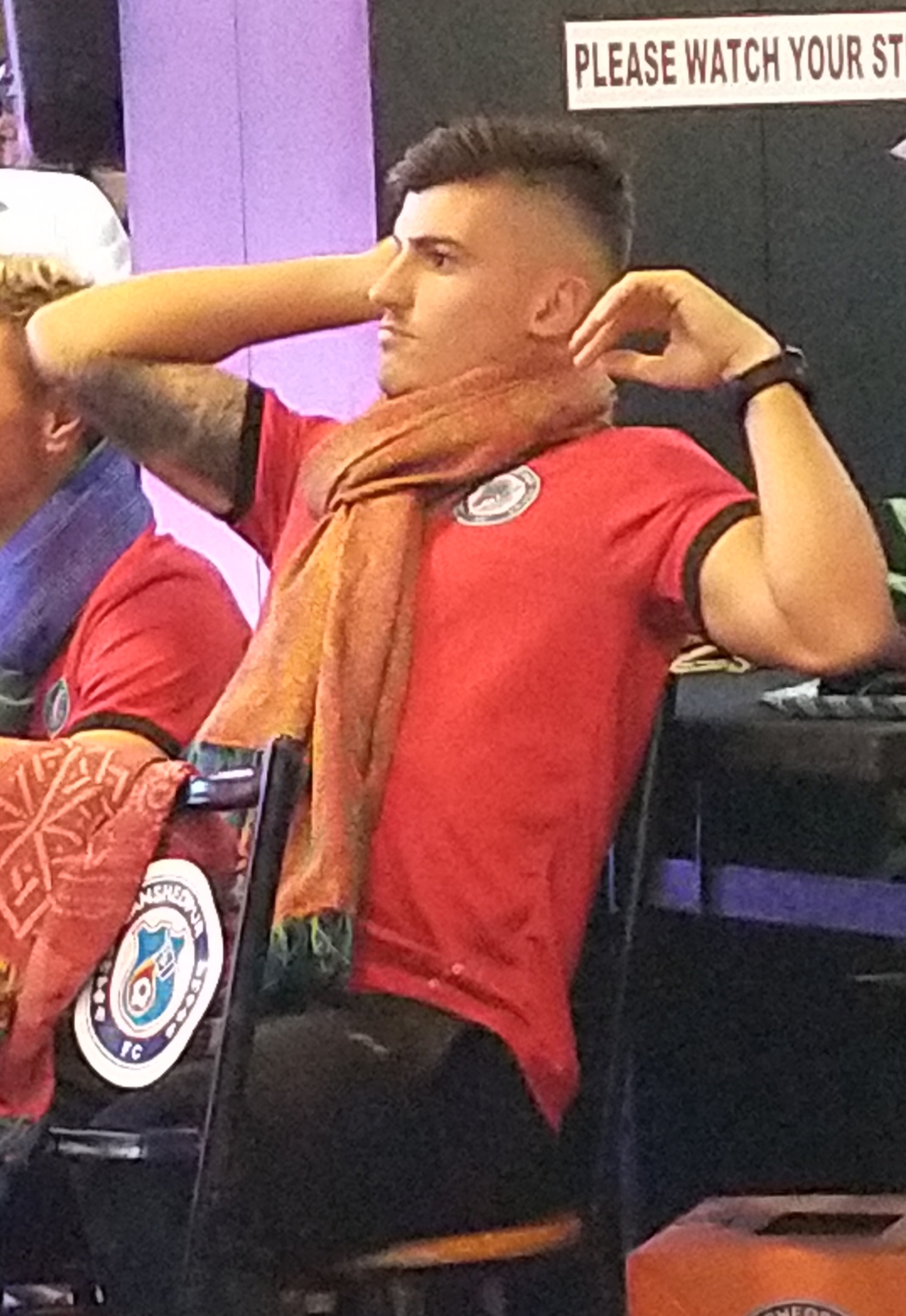
- Castel with Jamshedpur in 2019

Personal information
- Full name: Sergio Castel Martínez
- Date of birth: 22 February 1995 (age 31)
- Place of birth: Las Rozas, Spain
- Height: 1.88 m (6 ft 2 in)
- Position: Striker

Team information
- Current team: Persik Kediri
- Number: 9

Youth career
- –2012: Las Rozas
- 2013–2014: Osasuna

Senior career*
Years	Team	Apps	(Gls)
2012–2013	Rubí	20	(2)
2014	Osasuna B	0	(0)
2014	→ Tudelano (loan)	1	(0)
2014	Lealtad	4	(0)
2014–2015	Las Rozas	23	(8)
2015–2016	Bendigo City		
2016	Than Quang Ninh		
2017	Alcorcón B	6	(1)
2017–2019	SS Reyes	51	(15)
2019–2021	Atlético Madrid B	0	(0)
2019–2020	→ Jamshedpur (loan)	11	(7)
2020–2021	→ Ibiza (loan)	19	(7)
2021–2023	Ibiza	69	(16)
2023	Burgos	10	(0)
2023–2024	Anorthosis Famagusta	32	(12)
2024–2025	Málaga	13	(1)
2025	Marbella	0	(0)
2025–2026	Apollon Limassol	15	(3)
2026	Persib Bandung	6	(0)
2026–	Persik Kediri	7	(2)
- * Club domestic league appearances and goals as of 21 November 2026

Sergio Castel Martínez (born 22 February 1995) is a Spanish professional footballer who plays as a striker for Super League club Persik Kediri.

== Club career ==
Born in Las Rozas, Community of Madrid, Castel made his senior debut with Tercera División side UE Rubí, in the 2012–13 season. In July 2013, he joined CA Osasuna and returned to the youth setup, but on 31 January of the following year, he was loaned to CD Tudelano in Segunda División B, for six months.

In July 2014, Castel moved to CD Lealtad also in the third division, but left the club in November after featuring rarely. He then signed for Las Rozas CF, a club he already represented as a youth, before moving abroad to Bendigo City FC in Australia.

Castel only returned to Spain on 25 January 2017, after agreeing to a contract with AD Alcorcón's reserves in the fourth division. On 18 August, he moved to third level club UD San Sebastián de los Reyes.

In August 2019, after scoring a career-best 13 goals for Sanse, Castel joined Atlético Madrid, being initially assigned to the B-team; subsequently, he was loaned to Indian Super League side Jamshedpur FC until the end of the year. On 2 October 2020, he moved to third division side UD Ibiza also in a temporary deal.

On 14 July 2021, after being a regular starter in their first-ever promotion to Segunda División, Castel signed a permanent two-year contract with Ibiza. He left the club on 23 January 2023, and signed for fellow second division team Burgos CF seven days later.

On 7 July 2023, Castel was announced at Anorthosis Famagusta of the Cypriot First Division on a two-year deal. On 20 August of the following year, he returned to his home country after joining Málaga CF in division two.

On 3 February 2025, Castel terminated his link with the Boquerones, and signed a six-month contract with Marbella in the third tier.

On 20 June 2025, Castel returns to Cyprus signing one-year contract with Apollon Limassol.

Persik Kediri announced the signing of Castel on 6 August 2026 with one year contract. He previously played for Persib Bandung last season for six months, making six league appearances without scoring any goals.

== Career statistics ==
As of match played 11 March 2024

Club	Season	League			National Cup		Europe		Other		Total	
Club	Season	Division	Apps	Goals	Apps	Goals	Apps	Goals	Apps	Goals	Apps	Goals
UE Rubí	2012–13	Tercera División	20	2	—		—		—		20	2
Osasuna B	2013–14	Tercera División	—		—		—		—		—	
CD Tudelano	2013–14 (loan)	Segunda División B	1	0	—		—		—		1	0
CD Lealtad	2014–15	Segunda División B	4	0	1	0	—		—		5	0
Las Rozas CF	2014–15	Pref.	23	8	—		—		—		23	8
Bendigo City FC	2015–16	National Premier Leagues	?	?	—		—		—		?	?
Than Quang Ninh	2016–17	V.League 1	?	?	—		—		—		?	?
Alcorcón B	2016–17	Tercera División	6	1	—		—		—		6	1
SS Reyes	2017–18	Segunda División B	17	2	—		—		—		17	2
SS Reyes	2018–19	Segunda División B	34	13	—		—		—		34	13
SS Reyes	Subtotal		51	15	—		—		—		51	15
Atlético Madrid B	2019–20	Segunda División B	—		—		—		—		—	
Jamshedpur (loan)	2019–20	Indian Super League	11	7	—		—		—		11	7
Ibiza (loan)	2020–21	Segunda División B	21	7	3	3	—		—		24	10
Ibiza	2021–22	Segunda División	32	9	2	0	—		—		34	9
Ibiza	2022–23	Segunda División	16	0	—		—		—		16	0
Ibiza	Subtotal		48	9	2	0	—		—		50	9
Burgos	2022–23	Segunda División	10	0	—		—		—		10	0
Anorthosis	2023–24	Cyta Championship	26	12	3	4	—		—		29	16
Career total			221	61	9	4	0	0	0	0	230	68

== Honours ==
Persib Bandung

- Super League: 2025–26
