= Iván Arboleda =

Colombian footballer (born 1996)

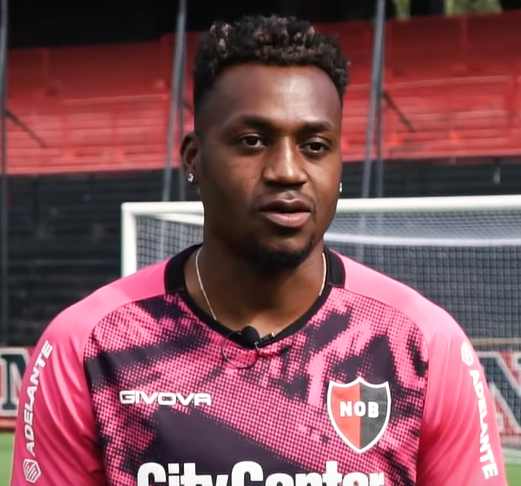
- Arboleda in 2022

Personal information
- Full name: Iván Mauricio Arboleda
- Date of birth: 21 April 1996 (age 30)
- Place of birth: Tumaco, Colombia
- Height: 1.85 m (6 ft 1 in)
- Position: Goalkeeper

Team information
- Current team: Sarmiento
- Number: 1

Youth career
- Deportivo Pasto

Senior career*
Years	Team	Apps	(Gls)
2014–2021	Banfield	74	(0)
2021–2022	Rayo Vallecano	0	(0)
2022	→ Newell's Old Boys (loan)	7	(0)
2023–2024	Anorthosis Famagusta	26	(0)
2024–2025	Millonarios	9	(0)
2026	Águilas Doradas	13	(0)
2026–	Sarmiento	2	(0)

International career^{‡}
2013	Colombia U17	4	(0)
2019	Colombia	1	(0)
- * Club domestic league appearances and goals as of 18:01, 10 November 2026 (UTC) ‡ National team caps and goals as of 00:13, 28 March 2019 (UTC)

Iván Mauricio Arboleda (born 21 April 1996) is a Colombian professional footballer who plays as a goalkeeper for Argentine Primera División club Sarmiento.

== Club career ==
Arboleda's first club was Categoría Primera A team Deportivo Pasto, whom he was with in the youth ranks until 2014 when he departed to sign for Primera División side Banfield. He was an unused substitute three times during the 2015 campaign prior to making his professional debut in the following season on 20 March 2016 against River Plate.

On 4 September 2021, free agent Arboleda signed a contract with La Liga side Rayo Vallecano. The following 27 January, after being only a third-choice, he moved to Newell's Old Boys on loan.

On 27 June 2023, Arboleda joined Cypriot side club, Anorthosis Famagusta

== International career ==
Arboleda represented Colombia's U17 team, winning four caps at the 2013 South American Championship in Argentina. He was selected for Colombia's preliminary squad ahead of the 2018 FIFA World Cup. However, he did not make the cut to twenty-three. He made his international bow on 26 March 2019 at the Seoul World Cup Stadium against South Korea, having been on the bench for the previous friendly versus Japan days prior.

== Career statistics ==
=== Club ===
As of match played 15 November 2024.

Appearances and goals by club, season and competition
Club	Season	League			Cup		Continental		Other		Total	
Club	Season	Division	Apps	Goals	Apps	Goals	Apps	Goals	Apps	Goals	Apps	Goals
Banfield	2015	Primera División	—		—		—		—		—	
Banfield	2016	Primera División	1	0	—		—		—		1	0
Banfield	2016–17	Primera División	1	0	—		—		—		1	0
Banfield	2017–18	Primera División	13	0	1	0	4 (Note: Appearance(s) in the Copa Libertadores)	0	—		18	0
Banfield	2018–19	Primera División	22	0	2	0	4 (Note: Appearance(s) in the Copa Sudamericana)	0	0	0	28	0
Banfield	2019–20	Primera División	13	0	1	0	—		1	0	15	0
Banfield	2020–21	Primera División	24	0	1	0	—		—		25	0
Banfield	Total		74	0	5	0	8	0	1	0	88	0
Rayo Vallecano	2021–22	La Liga	0	0	0	0	—		—		0	0
Newell's Old Boys (loan)	2022	Primera División	7	0	1	0	—		—		8	0
Anorthosis	2023–24	Cypriot First Division	26	0	1	0	—		—		27	0
Millonarios	2024	Categoría Primera A	6	0	0	0	—		—		6	0
Career total			113	0	7	0	8	0	1	0	129	0

=== International ===
As of 28 March 2019.

National team	Year	Apps	Goals
Colombia	2019	1	0
Total		1	0
