= Kyperounda Community Stadium =

Football stadium in Kyperounta, Cyprus

Kyperounda Stadium
- Κοινοτικό Στάδιο Κυπερούντας
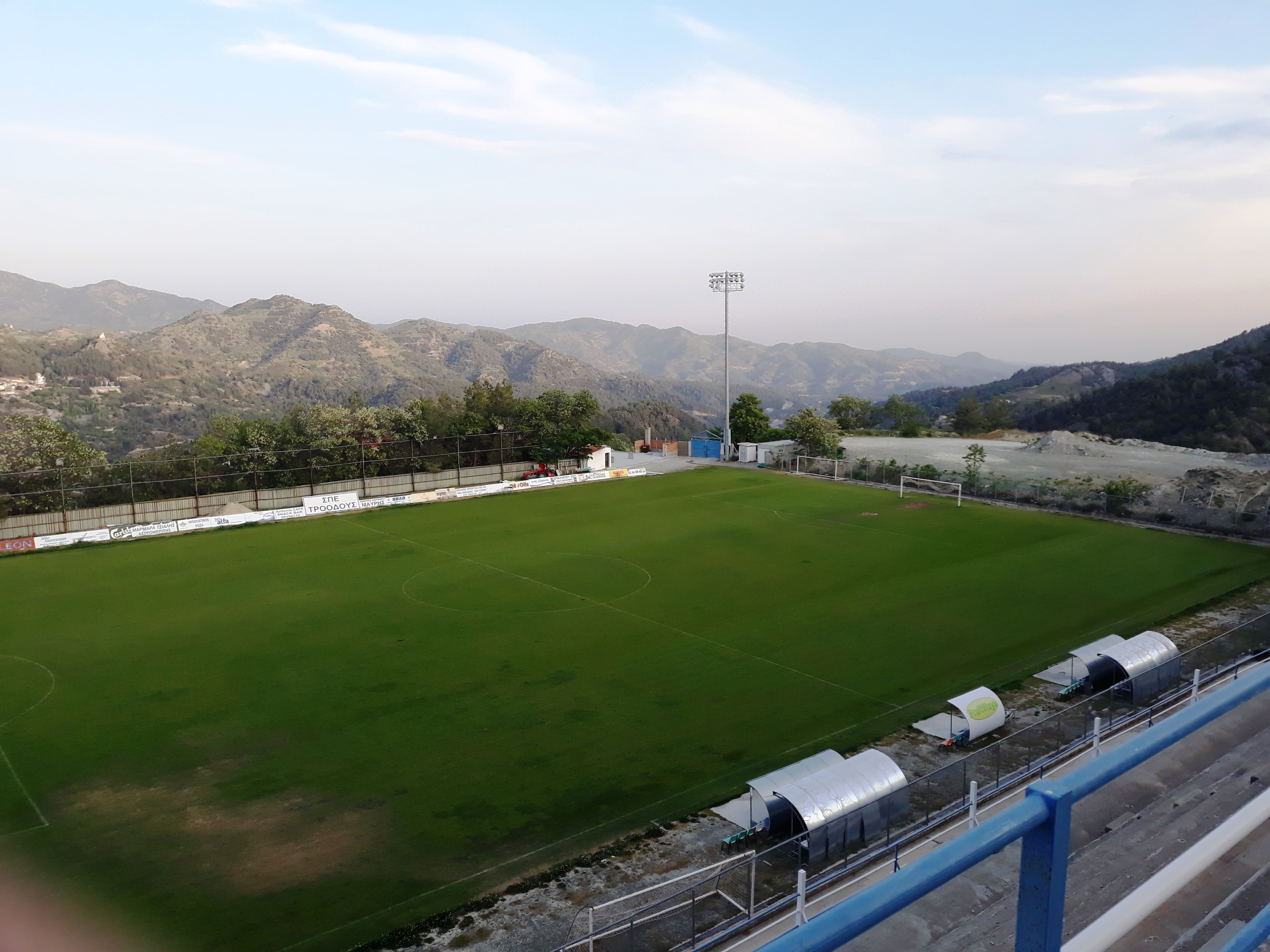
- Interactive map of Kyperounda Stadium
- Full name: Kyperounda Community Stadium
- Location: Kyperounta, Cyprus
- Coordinates: 34.935236°N 32.975947°E
- Capacity: 6,000

Tenant
- APEP Pitsilia

Kyperounda Stadium is a football stadium in Kyperounta, Cyprus. It is currently used mostly for football matches and is the home ground of APEP Pitsilia of the Cypriot Third Division. The stadium has a capacity of 6,000 spectators.
