= David Gallego =

Spanish footballer (born 1972)

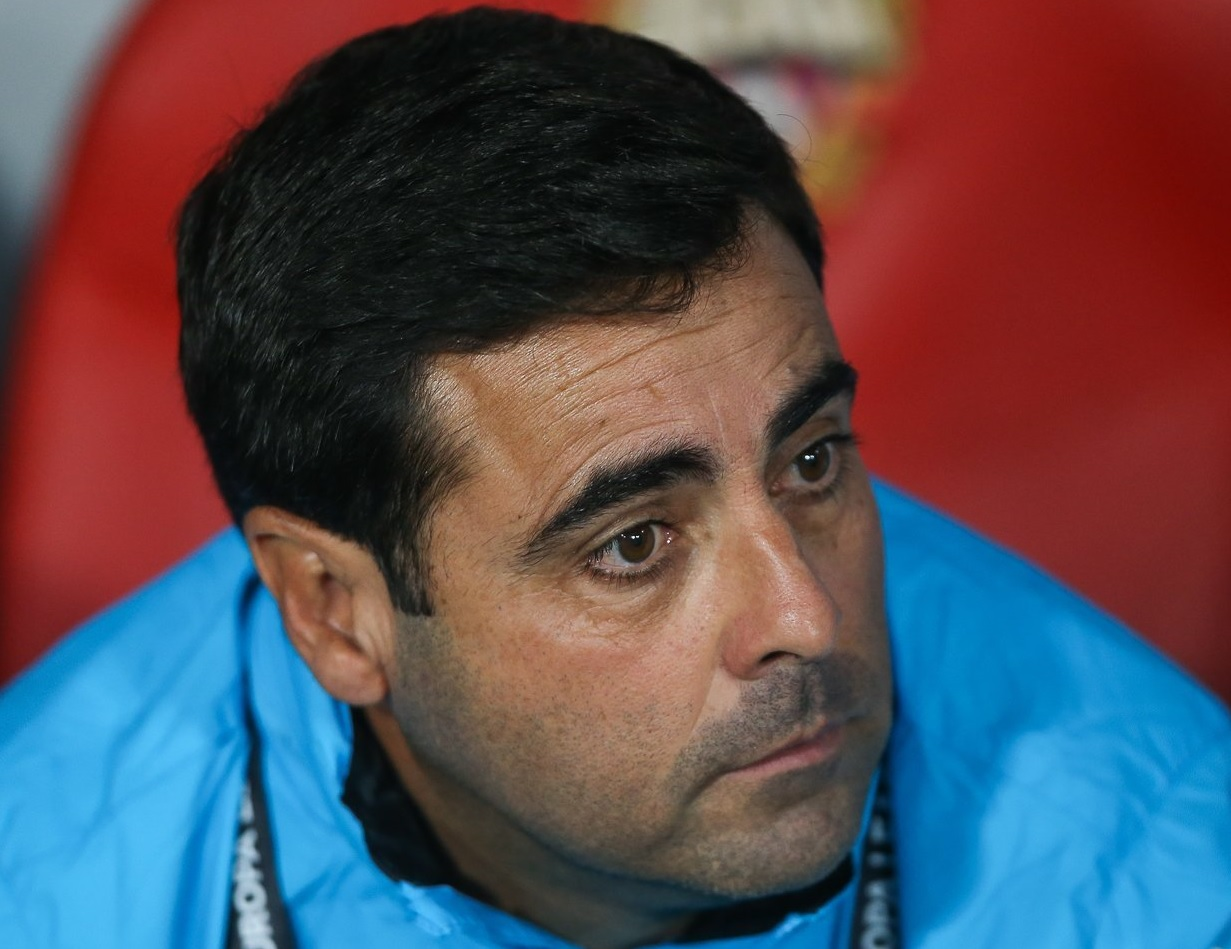
- Gallego coaching Espanyol in 2019

Personal information
- Full name: David Gallego Rodríguez
- Date of birth: 26 January 1972 (age 54)
- Place of birth: Súria, Spain
- Height: 1.65 m (5 ft 5 in)
- Position: Midfielder

Youth career
- Súria
- Manresa

Senior career*
Years	Team	Apps	(Gls)
1987–1991	Manresa		
1991–1993	Hospitalet	28	(3)
1993–1994	Manlleu	33	(5)
1994–1995	Levante	42	(7)
1995–1996	Sant Andreu	17	(5)
1996–1997	Córdoba	55	(9)
1997–1999	Terrassa	69	(26)
1999–2001	Hércules	55	(11)
2001–2002	Córdoba	42	(4)
2002–2003	Recreativo	10	(0)
2003–2005	Terrassa	55	(6)
2005–2006	Badalona	12	(1)
2006–2009	Manresa		
Total		418	(77)

Managerial career
- 2010: Sant Feliu Sasserra
- 2010–2013: Súria
- 2013–2016: Espanyol (youth)
- 2016–2018: Espanyol B
- 2018: Espanyol
- 2018–2019: Espanyol B
- 2019: Espanyol
- 2020–2022: Sporting Gijón
- 2022–2023: Ponferradina
- 2023–2024: Anorthosis
- 2024: APOEL
- * Club domestic league appearances and goals

David Gallego Rodríguez (born 26 January 1972) is a Spanish professional football manager and former player who played as a midfielder.

He played ten La Liga games for Recreativo, and 97 in Segunda División for Córdoba and Terrassa, scoring ten goals with the latter. He spent most of his career in Segunda División B.

As a manager, Gallego had two brief spells at Espanyol in the top flight, also leading Sporting Gijón and Ponferradina in the second division.

== Playing career ==
Born in Súria, Barcelona, Catalonia, Gallego made his senior debut for Manresa, before joining Segunda División B side L'Hospitalet in 1991. He continued to appear in the category in the following years, representing Manlleu, Levante, Sant Andreu, Córdoba, Terrassa and Hércules; with the Egarenses he scored a career-best 19 goals in the 1997–98 campaign.

Gallego returned to Córdoba in January 2001, with the club now in Segunda División. He made his professional debut on 14 January by starting in a 0–0 away draw against Albacete, and scored his first professional goal seven days later in a 2–0 home win against Sporting Gijón.

In the summer of 2002, Gallego joined La Liga club Recreativo. He made his debut in the category on 1 September, coming on as a second half substitute in a 2–3 home loss against Málaga.

After Recre's relegation, Gallego returned to Terrassa. After suffering another drop, he moved down to the lower leagues, representing Badalona and Manresa before retiring in 2009, aged 37.

== Managerial career ==
Immediately after retiring Gallego worked as a manager, being appointed at the helm of Sant Feliu Sasserra on 23 January 2010. In July, he returned to former club Súria, and achieved promotion to the Segona Catalana with the latter in 2013.

On 25 June 2013, Gallego was appointed as manager of Espanyol's youth setup, being in charge of the Juvenil squad. He was named at the helm of the reserve team in the third division on 16 June 2016.

Gallego was named as the manager of the first team on 20 April 2018 after the sacking of Quique Sánchez Flores. Starting with a 2–0 win at neighbours Girona two days later, he won four and drew the other of his five fixtures, with ten goals for and two against; the run included victories at Atlético Madrid and Athletic Bilbao. On 30 May, he returned to his previous role.

On 6 June 2019, Gallego replaced Rubi at the helm of the main squad, after agreeing to a two-year contract. He was sacked on 7 October after a poor run of results.

Gallego was named in charge of Sporting Gijón in the second division on 21 July 2020. On 22 February 2022, after only achieving three wins in the last 17 matches, he was sacked.

On 20 November 2022, Gallego replaced José Gomes at the helm of Ponferradina also in the second level. He was shown the door on 10 April, with the team six points inside the relegation zone with seven games remaining.

Gallego embarked on the first foreign job of his career on 14 June 2023, with Cypriot First Division club Anorthosis Famagusta.

== Managerial statistics ==
As of 22 August 2024

Managerial record by team and tenure
Team	Nat	From	To	Record								Ref
Team	Nat	From	To	G	W	D	L	GF	GA	GD	Win %	Ref
Sant Feliu Sasserra	(Spain)	23 January 2010	1 July 2010	17	2	4	11	12	34	−22	11.76	
Súria	(Spain)	1 July 2010	25 June 2013	102	67	14	21	255	103	+152	65.69	
Espanyol B	(Spain)	16 June 2016	20 April 2018	72	32	20	20	105	72	+33	44.44	
Espanyol	(Spain)	20 April 2018	30 May 2018	5	4	1	0	10	2	+8	80.00	
Espanyol B	(Spain)	30 May 2018	6 June 2019	38	16	12	10	55	38	+17	42.11	
Espanyol	(Spain)	6 June 2019	7 October 2019	16	7	4	5	25	19	+6	43.75	
Sporting Gijón	(Spain)	21 July 2020	22 February 2022	77	31	23	23	76	66	+10	40.26	
Ponferradina	(Spain)	20 November 2022	10 April 2023	19	3	9	7	10	17	−7	15.79	
Anorthosis	(Cyprus)	14 June 2023	13 March 2024	32	16	6	10	48	32	+16	50.00	
APOEL	(Cyprus)	1 July 2024	24 August 2024	5	1	2	2	3	5	−2	20.00	
Total				383	179	95	109	599	388	+211	46.74	—
