= Andreas Savva =

Cypriot footballer (born 2004)

Personal information
- Full name: Andreas Savva
- Date of birth: 21 July 2004 (age 22)
- Place of birth: Cyprus
- Height: 1.78 m (5 ft 10 in)
- Position: Winger

Youth career
- Omonia

Senior career*
Years	Team	Apps	(Gls)
2020–2023	Omonia	10	(2)
- * Club domestic league appearances and goals as of 20 May 2023

Andreas Savva (born 21 July 2004) is a Cypriot footballer who plays as an attacking midfielder.

== Education ==
Andreas Savva currently attends high school in his home town of Nicosia. He has been admitted to study engineering at Harvard University and will be enrolled in September 2023.

== Honours ==
Omonia

- Cypriot Cup: 2021–22, 2022–23
- Cypriot Super Cup: 2021
