= Kostakis Artymatas =

Cypriot footballer

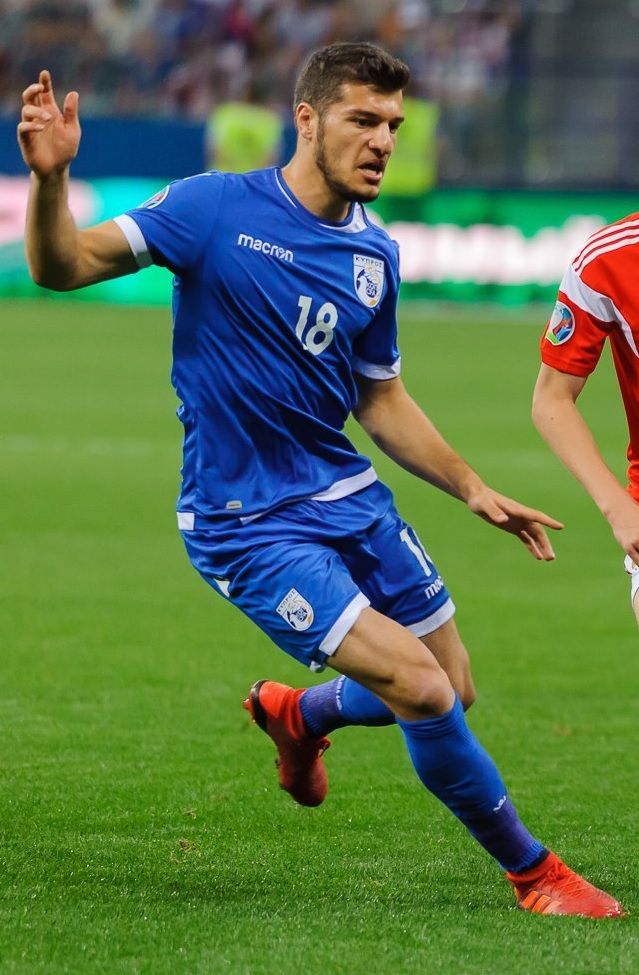
- Artymatas playing for Cyprus in 2019

Personal information
- Date of birth: 15 April 1993 (age 33)
- Place of birth: Paralimni, Cyprus
- Positions: Defensive midfielder; centre-back

Team information
- Current team: Anorthosis Famagusta
- Number: 4

Youth career
- 2001–2009: Enosis Neon Paralimni
- 2009–2012: Nottingham Forest

Senior career*
Years	Team	Apps	(Gls)
2012–2013	Enosis Neon Paralimni	18	(3)
2013–2019	APOEL	74	(1)
2017–2018	→ Kerkyra (loan)	25	(0)
2019–	Anorthosis Famagusta	159	(6)

International career^{‡}
2010–2012	Cyprus U19	8	(0)
2012–2013	Cyprus U21	7	(0)
2012–	Cyprus	85	(1)
- * Club domestic league appearances and goals as of 14 June 2026 ‡ National team caps and goals as of 20:55, 15 November 2026 (UTC)

Kostakis Artymatas (Greek: Κωστάκης Αρτυματάς, born 15 April 1993) is a Cypriot professional footballer who plays as a defensive midfielder for and captains both Cypriot First Division club Anorthosis Famagusta and the Cyprus national team.

== Club career ==
=== Early career ===
Artymatas started his playing career when he was eight years old at Enosis Neon Paralimni academies and at age sixteen he moved to Nottingham Forest academies in England where he stayed for three years. He returned to Cyprus in June 2012 and he made his professional debut with Enosis Neon Paralimni on 15 September 2012, in a league match against Anorthosis Famagusta which ended in 1–1 draw.

=== APOEL ===
On 14 June 2013, Artymatas moved from Enosis Neon Paralimni to APOEL (for a transfer fee of €120,000) and he signed a four-year contract with his new club. He made his debut on 11 November 2013, in a Cypriot First Division match against Alki Larnaca at GSP Stadium, coming on as an 80th-minute substitute in APOEL's 3–0 victory. A month later, he made his debut in European competitions, playing the full 90 minutes in APOEL's 2–0 defeat at Eintracht Frankfurt for the last matchday of the 2013–14 UEFA Europa League group stage. During his first season at APOEL, he won his first career titles, winning all the Cypriot competitions, the Cypriot First Division, the Cypriot Cup and the Cypriot Super Cup.

In the 2014–15 season, he added two more trophies to his collection, as APOEL won again both the Cypriot championship and the cup. He scored his first official goal for APOEL on 17 October 2015, netting the fifth goal in APOEL's 6–0 home victory against AEL Limassol in the Cypriot First Division.

On 19 September 2016, Artymatas signed a three-year contract extension with APOEL, running until 31 May 2020.

On 31 August 2017, Artymatas signed a long season contract with Super League Greece club Kerkyra on loan from APOEL.

=== Anorthosis ===
In July 2019 he moved to Anorthosis.

== International career ==
Artymatas made his international debut with Cyprus on 12 October 2012, in a 2014 FIFA World Cup qualification match against Slovenia at Ljudski vrt Stadium, coming on as a 46th-minute substitute in Cyprus' 2–1 defeat.

== Career statistics ==
As of match played 9 May 2025

Appearances and goals by club, season and competition
Club	Season	League			National Cup		Europe		Other		Total	
Club	Season	Division	Apps	Goals	Apps	Goals	Apps	Goals	Apps	Goals	Apps	Goals
EN Paralimni	2012–13	Cypriot First Division	18	3	—		—		—		18	3
APOEL	2013–14	Cypriot First Division	9	0	4	0	1	0	—		14	0
APOEL	2014–15	Cypriot First Division	12	0	3	0	1	0	—		16	0
APOEL	2015–16	Cypriot First Division	26	1	2	0	7	0	—		35	1
APOEL	2016–17	Cypriot First Division	15	0	4	1	5	0	—		24	1
APOEL	2017–18	Cypriot First Division	0	0	0	0	3	0	—		3	0
APOEL	2018–19	Cypriot First Division	12	0	3	0	—		—		15	0
APOEL	Total		74	1	16	1	17	0	—		107	2
Kerkyra (loan)	2017–18	Super League Greece	25	0	2	0	—		—		27	0
Anorthosis	2019–20	Cypriot First Division	22	0	4	0	—		—		26	0
Anorthosis	2020–21	Cypriot First Division	33	1	6	1	1	0	—		40	2
Anorthosis	2021–22	Cypriot First Division	29	4	4	0	9	1	—		42	5
Anorthosis	2022–23	Cypriot First Division	25	0	1	0	—		—		26	0
Anorthosis	2023–24	Cypriot First Division	5	0	—		—		—		5	0
Anorthosis	2024–25	Cypriot First Division	26	1	2	0	—		—		28	1
Anorthosis	Total		140	6	17	1	10	1	—		167	7
Career total			257	10	35	2	27	1	—		319	13

=== International ===
As of match played 15 November 2026

Cyprus
Year	Apps	Goals
2012	2	0
2013	1	0
2014	2	0
2015	1	0
2016	6	0
2017	10	0
2018	8	0
2019	8	1
2020	6	0
2021	11	0
2022	8	0
2023	2	0
2024	10	0
2025	5	0
2026	5	0
Total	85	1

=== International goals ===
Scores and results list Cyprus' goal tally first.

No.	Date	Venue	Opponent	Score	Result	Competition
1.	9 September 2019	San Marino Stadium, Serravalle, San Marino	San Marino	4–0	4–0	UEFA Euro 2020 qualification
