= Kyperounta =

Kyperounta Κυπερούντα
- Town
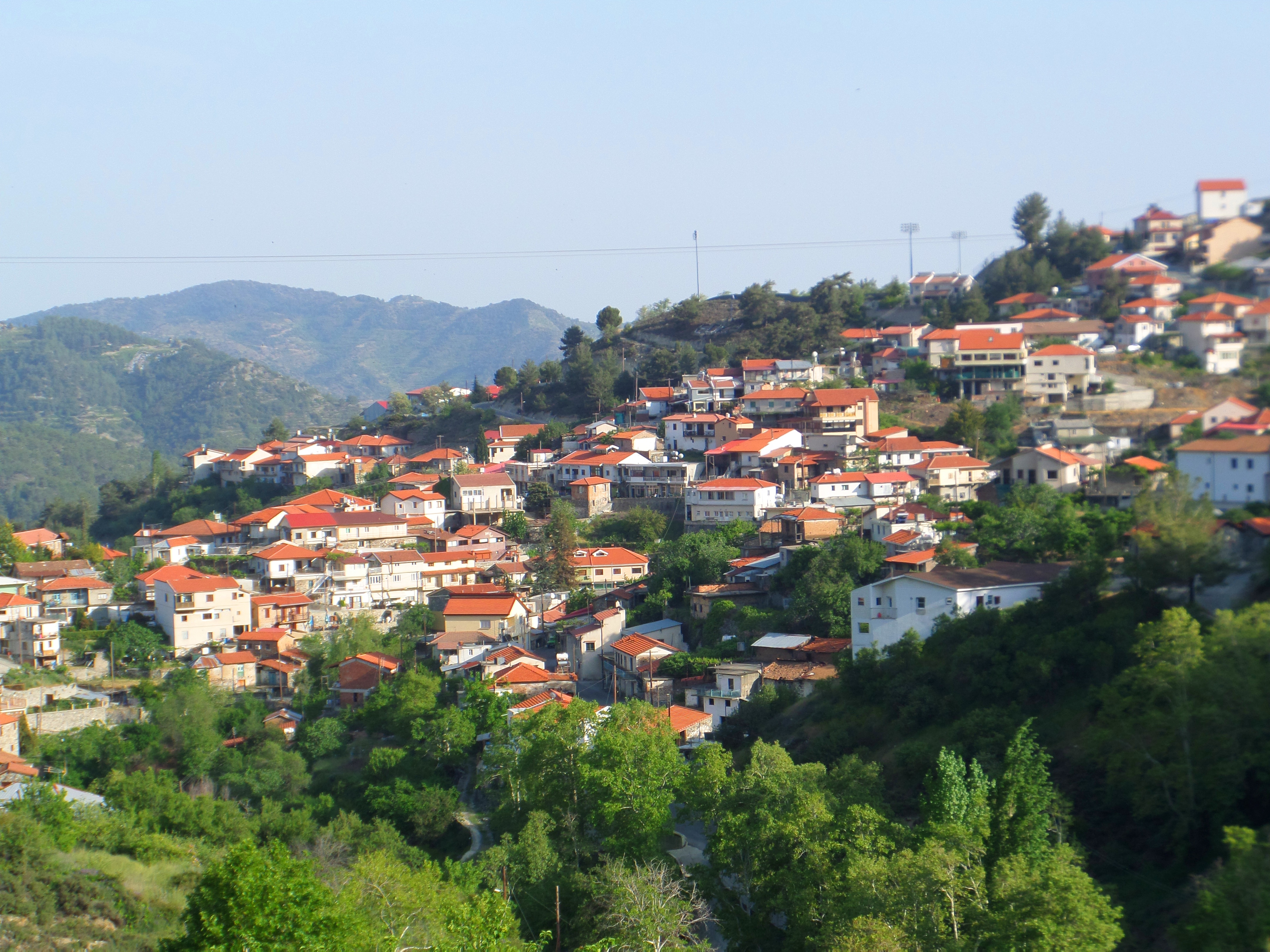
- Scenic view of Kyperounta

- Location in Cyprus
- Coordinates: 34°56′29″N 32°58′9″E
- Country: Cyprus
- District: Limassol District

Population (2001)
  - Total: 1,497
- Time zone: UTC+2 (EET)
  - Summer (DST): UTC+3 (EEST)

Kyperounta (Greek: Κυπερούντα) is a town in Cyprus. It lies at an altitude of 1,140 meters. With a population in approximately 1,500 it can be called the head-town of Pitsilia. The town took its name from the plant Cyperus rotundus (kyperos). Kyperounda was established during the Byzantine period. At historical documents was called "Chiperonda".

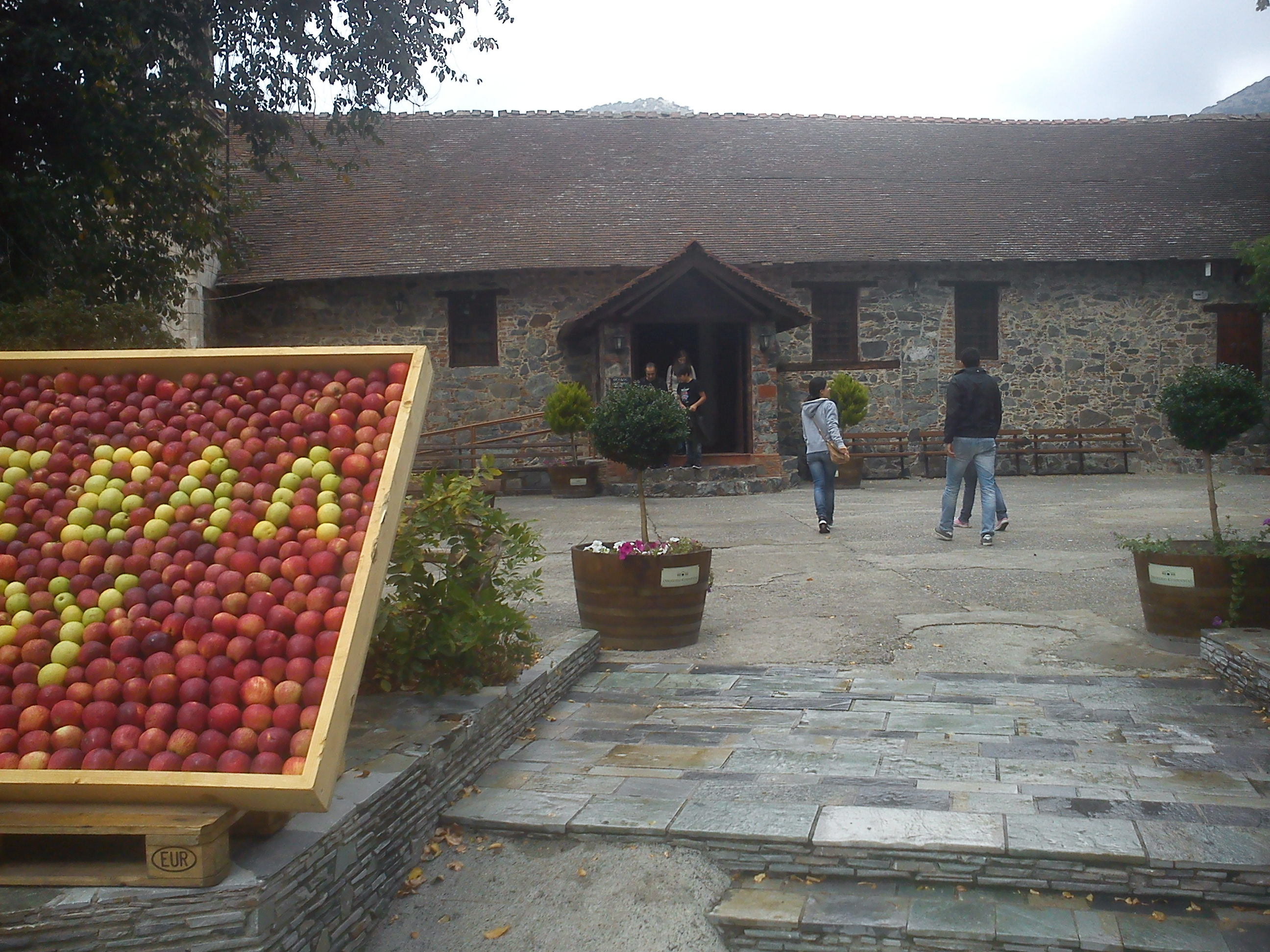
Church Agias Marinas

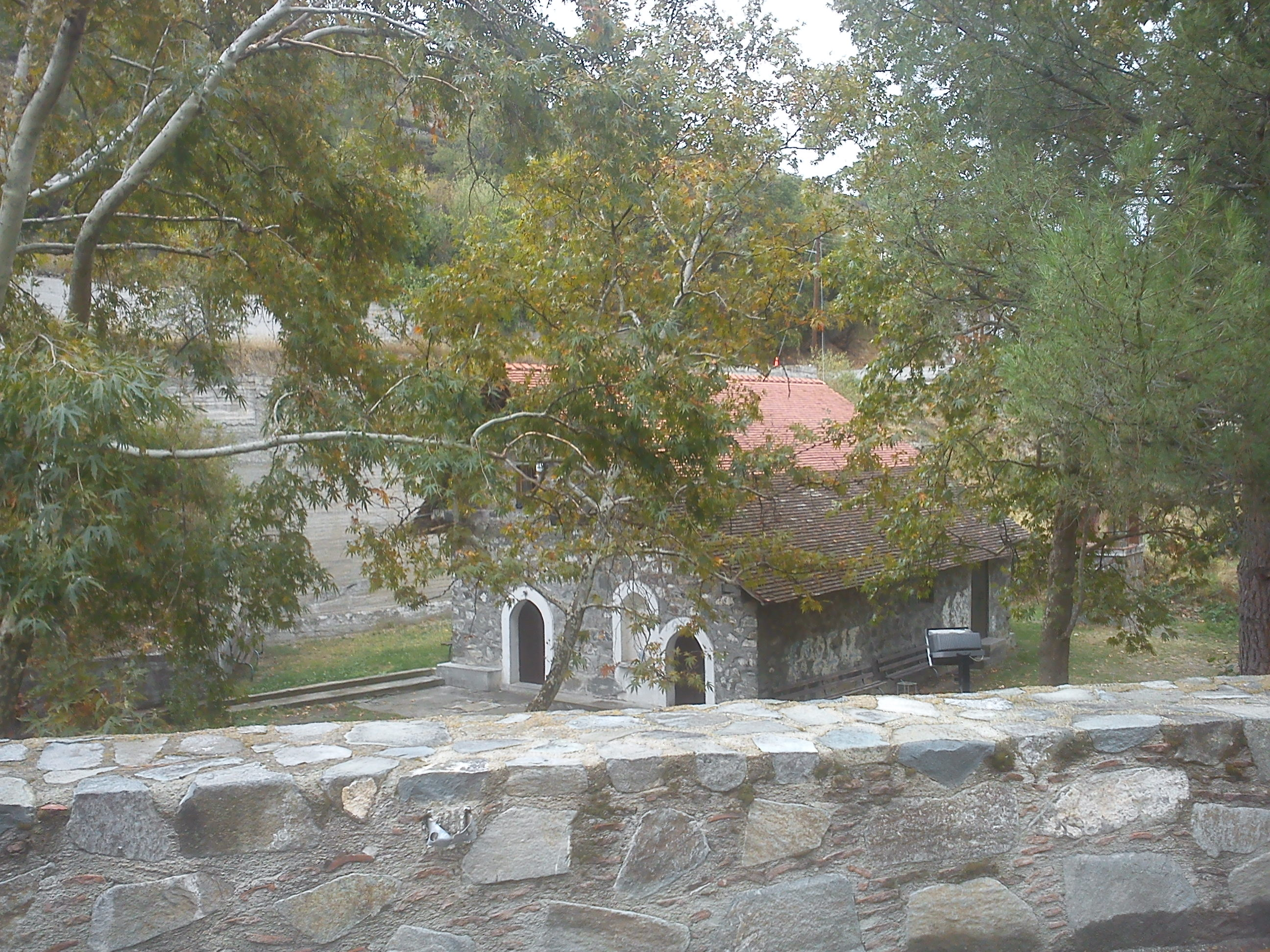
church of Virgin Mary (Panagia) and Chrysosotiros

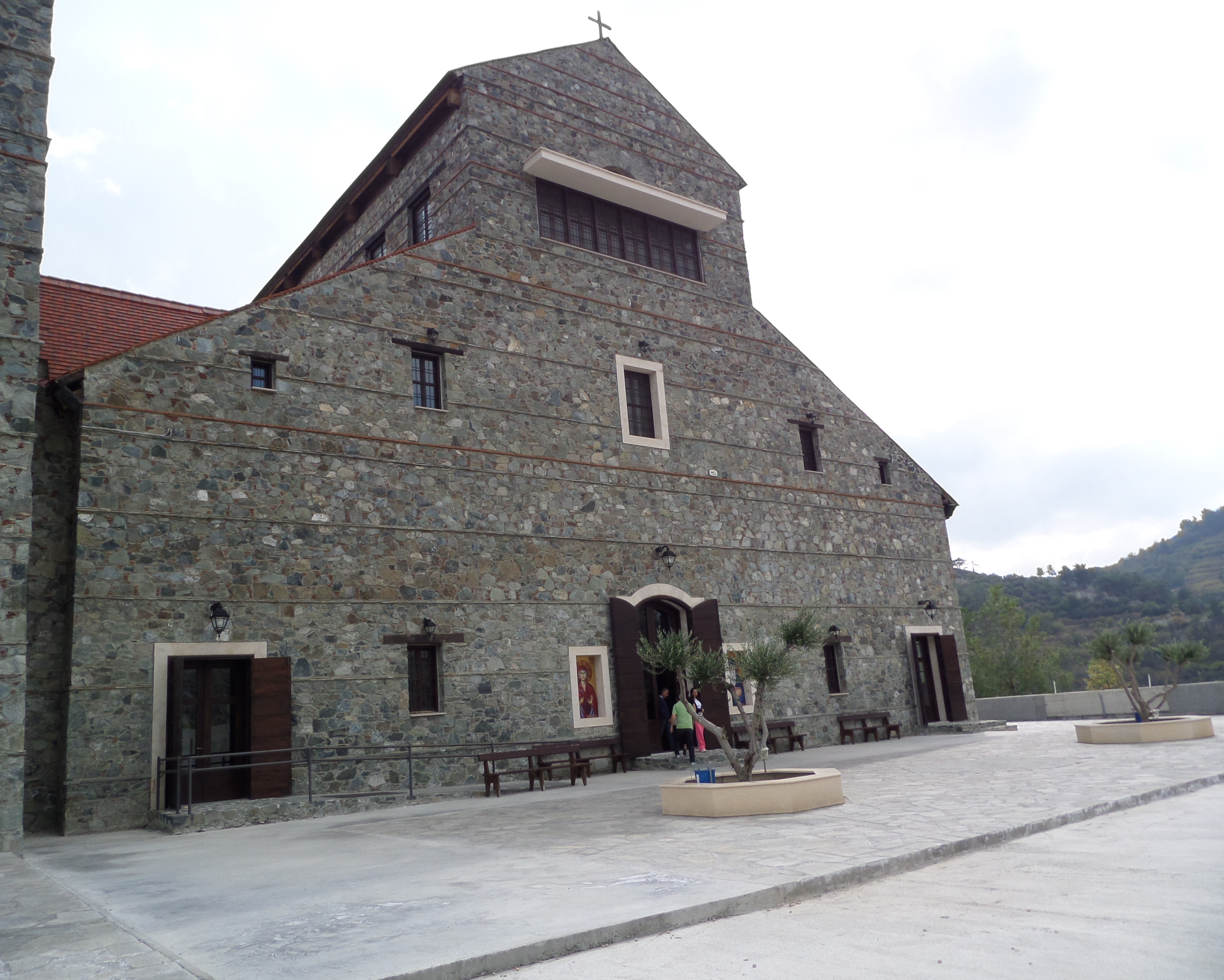
Saint Arsenios church
