= Katokopia =

Katokopia: Kατωκοπιά (Greek); Zümrütköy (Turkish)
- Location within Cyprus
- Coordinates: 35°10′27″N 33°03′04″E
- Country (de jure): Cyprus
  - District: Nicosia District
- Country (de facto): Northern Cyprus
  - District: Güzelyurt District

Population (2011)
  - Total: 817
- Time zone: UTC+2 (EET)
  - Summer (DST): UTC+3 (EEST)
- Climate: Csa

Katokopia (Greek: Kατωκοπιά [locally [katokoˈpca]]; Turkish: Zümrütköy) is a village located in the Nicosia District of Cyprus, 7 km east of Morphou. De facto, it is under the control of Northern Cyprus.

Originally inhabited by Greek Cypriots, since the Turkish invasion in 1974, the village has been solely inhabited by Turks.

== Culture, sports, and tourism ==
Turkish Cypriot Zümrütköy Sports Club was founded in 1975, and now in Cyprus Turkish Football Association (CTFA) K-PET 2nd League.

Katokopia is the original home of Greek Cypriot football club Doxa Katokopia.
