= 2020–21 Cypriot Cup =

79th season of Cypriot Cup

2020–21 Cyprus Coca-Cola Cup

Tournament details
- Country: Cyprus
- Dates: 16 September 2020 – 15 May 2021
- Teams: 27

Final positions
- Champions: Anorthosis Famagusta
- Runners-up: Olympiakos Nicosia

Tournament statistics
- Matches played: 32
- Goals scored: 107 (3.34 per match)

The 2020–21 Cypriot Cup was the 79th edition of the Cypriot Cup. A total of 26 clubs were accepted to enter the competition. It began in September 2020 with the first round and will conclude in May 2021 with the final. The winner of the Cup will qualify for the 2021–22 Europa League third qualifying round.

== First round ==
The first round draw took place on 4 September 2020 and the matches were played on 16 September – 21 October 2020. The four clubs qualified for European competition, Omonia, Anorthosis Famagusta, APOEL and Apollon Limassol, received a bye for this round. Enosis Neon Paralimni received another bye in the draw.

Team 1	Score	Team 2
Nea Salamis Famagusta	4–1	Achyronas Liopetriou
Karmiotissa FC	4–0	THOI Lakatamia
PAEEK	2–1	Doxa Katokopias
AEL Limassol	5–0	Omonia Psevda
Ayia Napa	1–5	Pafos FC
Olympiakos Nicosia	4–0	P.O. Xylotymbou 2006
Kouris Erimis	0–11	AEK Larnaca
Ermis Aradippou	3–0	Akritas Chlorakas
Alki Oroklini	4–0	Ypsonas FC
Digenis Akritas Morphou	1–3	Onisilos Sotira 2014
Aris Limassol	1–4	Ethnikos Achna

== Intermediate round ==
An intermediate round match was played between PAEEK and APOEL on 28 October 2020.

Team 1	Score	Team 2
PAEEK	0–4	APOEL

== Second round ==
The second round draw took place on 19 October 2020 and the matches were played on 28 October 2020 – 20 January 2021. Omonia received a bye to the quarter-finals due to participating in the 2020–21 UEFA Europa League group stage.

Team 1	Score	Team 2
Onisilos Sotira 2014	0–2	Karmiotissa FC
Enosis Neon Paralimni	0–2	Olympiakos Nicosia
Anorthosis Famagusta	1–0	Pafos FC
Ermis Aradippou	1–2	Nea Salamis Famagusta
AEK Larnaca	0–2	AEL Limassol
Alki Oroklini	1–2	Ethnikos Achna
APOEL	2–1	Apollon Limassol

== Quarter-finals ==
The quarter-final round draw took place on 4 February 2021 and the matches were played on 24 February – 17 March 2021.

Team 1	Agg.	Team 2	1st leg	2nd leg
Karmiotissa	2–7	Anorthosis Famagusta	1–2	1–5
APOEL	2–1	Omonia	1–1	1–0
AEL Limassol	2–1	Nea Salamis Famagusta	2–0	0–1
Ethnikos Achna	1–2	Olympiakos Nicosia	1–1	0–1

== Semi-finals ==
The semi-final round draw took place on 22 March 2021 and the matches were played on 14–21 April 2021.

Team 1	Agg.	Team 2	1st leg	2nd leg
Anorthosis Famagusta	4–1	APOEL	1–0	3–1
Olympiakos Nicosia	5–2	AEL Limassol	4–2	1–0

== Final ==
15 May 2021
20:30 EEST

Anorthosis Famagusta	2–1 (a.e.t.)	Olympiakos Nicosia
Artymatas 59'; Kvilitaia 110'	Report	Sarfo 61'

GSP Stadium, Nicosia
Referee: (Romania) Ovidiu Hațegan

== See also ==
- 2020–21 Cypriot First Division
- 2020–21 Cypriot Second Division
