= Cyprus national under-19 football team =

National U-19 association football team

Cyprus
- Nickname(s): Εθνική Νέων ("National team of Youth")
- Association: Cyprus Football Association
- Head coach: Savvas Damianou
- Captain: Christos Shelis
- Most caps: —
- Top scorer: —
- Home stadium: various
First colours	Second colours

First international
- Cyprus 0–3 Yugoslavia (Nicosia, Cyprus; 14 March 1979)

Biggest win
- Cyprus 7–0 Gibraltar (Czech Republic; 22 October 2013)

Biggest defeat
- Spain 8–1 Cyprus (Torrevieja, Spain; 28 May 2006) Cyprus0-7Netherlands (Nov 12, 2025)

UEFA U-19 Championship
- Appearances: 1 (first in 1998)
- Best result: Group stage (1998)

The Cypriot national under-19 football team is the national under-19 football team of Cyprus controlled by Cyprus Football Association.

== Results and fixtures ==
Win Draw Loss

=== 2027 UEFA European Under-19 Championship ===
==== Group A1 ====
Pos	Team	Pld	W	D	L	GF	GA	GD	Pts	Transfer or relegation
1	Belgium (H)	3	2	1	0	10	3	+7	7	Transferred to Round 2 League A
2	Sweden	3	2	1	0	11	5	+6	7	Transferred to Round 2 League A
3	Slovenia	3	1	0	2	2	8	−6	3	Transferred to Round 2 League A
4	Cyprus	3	0	0	3	1	8	−7	0	Relegated to Round 2 League B

Source: UEFA
Rules for classification: Qualification tiebreakers

25 March 2026	Belgium	4–0	Cyprus	National Training Centre Tubize, Tubize
19:00	Camara 30'; Gielen 41'; De Kimpe 55'; van de Ven 70'	Report		Referee: Mohammad Usman Aslam (Norway)

28 March 2026	Slovenia	1–0	Cyprus	National Training Centre Tubize, Tubize
12:00	Kovačič 38'	Report		Referee: Kevin O'Sullivan (Ireland)

31 March 2026	Cyprus	1–3	Sweden	Edmond Machtens Stadium, Brussels
15:00	Ilia 24'	Report	Sadarangani 21'; Brantlind 68'; Saeed 87'	Referee: Kevin O'Sullivan (Ireland)

== Current squad ==
- The following players were called up for the 2023 UEFA European Under-19 Championship qualification matches.
- Match dates: 17, 20 and 23 November 2022
- Opposition: Sweden, Ukraine, Kosovo
- Caps and goals correct as of: 26 September 2022, after the match against North Macedonia

No.	Pos.	Player	Date of birth (age)	Caps	Goals	Club
	GK	Panagiotis Kyriakou	5 May 2004 (age 22)	0	0	(Cyprus Football Association) AEL Limassol
	GK	Dimitrios Stylianidis	3 March 2004 (age 22)	5	0	(Cyprus Football Association) AEK Larnaca
	DF	Pavlos Charalampous	9 February 2004 (age 22)	0	0	(Cyprus Football Association) AEK Larnaca
	DF	David Djamas	21 April 2004 (age 22)	1	0	(Cyprus Football Association) APOEL
	DF	Andreas Evangelou	20 September 2004 (age 22)	9	0	(Cyprus Football Association) PAEEK
	DF	Alexandros Kaiafas	9 February 2004 (age 22)	2	0	(Cyprus Football Association) Omonia
	DF	Nikolas Kyriakidis	20 September 2004 (age 22)	0	0	(Cyprus Football Association) Omonia
	DF	Konstantinos Venizelou	5 July 2004 (age 22)	7	0	(Cyprus Football Association) Omonia
	MF	Ioannis Tsoutsouki	14 April 2004 (age 22)	2	0	(Cyprus Football Association) APOEL
	MF	Stylianos Vrontis	5 November 2004 (age 22)	9	2	(Cyprus Football Association) PO Xylotymbou
	FW	Stavros Georgiou	19 October 2004 (age 22)	3	4	(Cyprus Football Association) APOEL
	FW	Andreas Savva	21 July 2004 (age 22)	3	4	(Cyprus Football Association) Omonia
	FW	Nearchos Zinonos	29 January 2004 (age 22)	1	0	(Cyprus Football Association) Apollon Limassol

== See also ==
- Cyprus national football team
- Cyprus national under-21 football team
- Cyprus national under-17 football team
- European Under-19 Football Championship
