= 2021–22 Cypriot First Division =

Cypriot First Division season

Cyta Championship
- Season: 2021–22
- Dates: 20 August 2021 – May 2022
- Champions: Apollon; 4th title
- Relegated: Ethnikos Achna; PAEEK
- UEFA Champions League: Apollon; AEK Larnaca
- UEFA Europa League: Omonia
- UEFA Europa Conference League: APOEL; Aris Limassol
- Matches: 192
- Goals: 456 (2.38 per match)
- Top goalscorer: Ivan Trichkovski (15 goals)
- Biggest home win: Pafos 4–0 APOEL; 21 August 2021; AEL Limassol 4–0 Pafos; 13 September 2021
- Biggest away win: PAEEK 2–5 AC Omonia; 14 May 2022
- Highest scoring: PAEEK 2–5 AC Omonia; 14 May 2022
- Longest winning run: 5 matches AEK Larnaca; 27 September 2021 – 31 October 2021; Apollon Limassol; 16 January 2022 – 10 February 2022
- Longest unbeaten run: 15 matches APOEL; 18 October 2021 – 14 February 2022
- Longest winless run: 11 matches PAEEK; 11 December 2021 – 27 February 2022
- Longest losing run: 5 matches Ethnikos Achna; 18 December 2021 – 22 January 2022
- Highest attendance: 13,233; APOEL 1–1 AEK; 1 May 2022
- Total attendance: 390,458
- All statistics correct as of 22 May 2022.

The 2021–22 Cypriot First Division was the 83rd season of the Cypriot top-level football league.

== Stadiums and locations ==
Locations of the 2021–22 Cypriot First Division teams.

Note: Table lists clubs in alphabetical order.

Team	Location	Stadium	Capacity
AEK Larnaca	Larnaca	AEK Arena	7,400
AEL Limassol	Limassol	Tsirio Stadium	13,331
Anorthosis Famagusta	Famagusta	Antonis Papadopoulos Stadium	10,230
APOEL	Nicosia	GSP Stadium	22,859
Apollon Limassol	Limassol	Tsirio Stadium	13,331
Aris Limassol	Limassol	Tsirio Stadium	13,331
Doxa Katokopias	Katokopia, Nicosia	Makario Stadium	16,000
Ethnikos Achna	Achna, Famagusta	Dasaki Stadium	7,000
Olympiakos Nicosia	Nicosia	GSP Stadium	22,859
Omonia	Nicosia	GSP Stadium	22,859
PAEEK	Kyrenia	Makario Stadium	16,000
Pafos FC	Paphos	Stelios Kyriakides Stadium	9,394

== Personnel and kits ==
Note: Flags indicate national team as has been defined under FIFA eligibility rules. Players and Managers may hold more than one non-FIFA nationality.

Team	Head coach	Captain	Kit manufacturer	Shirt sponsor
AEK Larnaca	(Spain) David Badia	(North Macedonia) Ivan Trichkovski	Puma	Bet on Alfa
AEL Limassol	(Greece) Savvas Pantelidis	(Portugal) André Teixeira	Macron	Parimatch
Anorthosis Famagusta	(Georgia (country)) Temur Ketsbaia	(Cyprus) Kostakis Artymatas	Adidas	Allea Group
APOEL	(Cyprus) Sofronis Avgousti	(Cyprus) Georgios Efrem	Macron	Stoiximan
Apollon Limassol	(Germany) Alexander Zorniger	(Cyprus) Chambos Kyriakou	Puma	Stoiximan
Aris Limassol	(Belarus) Aleksey Shpilevsky	(Croatia) Gordon Schildenfeld	Jako	Parimatch
Doxa Katokopias	(Cyprus) Elias Charalambous	(Finland) Berat Sadik	Nike	Victory Ammunition
Ethnikos Achna	(Slovenia) Andrej Razdrh	(North Macedonia) Martin Bogatinov	Jako	OPAP Cyprus
Olympiakos Nicosia	(Bosnia and Herzegovina) Nedim Tutic	(Ghana) Kingsley Sarfo	Jako	Office Pro
Omonia	(Northern Ireland) Neil Lennon	(Spain) Jordi Gómez	Macron	Stoiximan
PAEEK	(Cyprus) Makis Sergides	(Cyprus) Charalambos Aristotelous	Givova	
Pafos FC	(Slovenia) Darko Milanič	(England) Jason Puncheon	Jako	Korantina Homes

== Regular season ==
=== League table ===
Pos	Team	Pld	W	D	L	GF	GA	GD	Pts	Qualification or relegation
1	Apollon Limassol	22	14	4	4	37	21	+16	46	Qualification for the Championship round
2	APOEL	22	11	6	5	35	25	+10	39	Qualification for the Championship round
3	AEK Larnaca	22	10	9	3	31	17	+14	39	Qualification for the Championship round
4	Anorthosis Famagusta	22	11	5	6	36	26	+10	38	Qualification for the Championship round
5	Aris Limassol	22	10	6	6	23	20	+3	36	Qualification for the Championship round
6	Pafos	22	8	10	4	27	19	+8	34	Qualification for the Championship round
7	Omonia	22	9	4	9	25	25	0	31	Qualification for the Relegation round
8	AEL Limassol	22	7	4	11	26	28	−2	25	Qualification for the Relegation round
9	Olympiakos Nicosia	22	5	7	10	14	23	−9	22	Qualification for the Relegation round
10	Doxa Katokopias	22	5	7	10	18	30	−12	22	Qualification for the Relegation round
11	PAEEK	22	3	6	13	17	35	−18	15	Qualification for the Relegation round
12	Ethnikos Achna	22	3	4	15	13	33	−20	13	Qualification for the Relegation round

Source: Cyprus Football Association
Rules for classification: 1) Points; 2) Head-to-head points; 3) Head-to-head goal difference; 4) Head-to-head goals scored; 5) Head-to-head away goals scored (only if two teams); 6) Goal difference; 7) Goals scored; 8) Play-off (only if deciding championship round, relegation round or relegation).

=== Results ===
Home \ Away	AEK	AEL	ANO	APOE	APOL	ARI	DOX	ETH	OLY	OMO	PAE	PAF
AEK Larnaca	—	3–1	1–1	0–0	2–1	0–0	1–1	1–0	1–0	2–1	3–0	1–3
AEL Limassol	0–2	—	2–1	2–3	0–1	0–1	3–2	1–0	3–0	0–1	0–0	4–0
Anorthosis Famagusta	1–2	2–1	—	2–1	1–1	3–1	2–0	2–1	3–1	1–1	2–3	1–0
APOEL	1–0	3–0	0–2	—	1–1	1–1	2–0	2–1	0–1	4–2	1–0	1–1
Apollon Limassol	1–4	2–1	2–2	2–1	—	0–2	3–0	4–2	2–1	2–0	3–1	2–0
Aris Limassol	1–0	1–2	3–2	0–1	0–1	—	1–0	2–1	1–0	0–2	1–1	0–0
Doxa Katokopias	1–4	0–0	2–0	2–2	0–3	1–2	—	0–0	0–0	2–1	1–0	1–1
Ethnikos Achna	0–0	2–2	0–2	0–3	0–1	0–3	0–1	—	1–0	0–2	1–3	0–1
Olympiakos Nicosia	0–0	1–1	3–2	1–1	0–2	1–2	1–0	0–0	—	1–0	1–0	1–2
Omonia	1–1	1–0	0–1	2–4	1–0	3–0	2–1	0–2	1–0	—	2–1	1–1
PAEEK	2–2	1–3	0–2	1–3	2–2	0–0	1–2	0–2	0–0	1–0	—	0–2
Pafos	1–1	1–0	1–1	4–0	0–1	1–1	1–1	3–0	1–1	1–1	2–0	—

Source: Cyprus Football Association
Legend: Blue = home team win; Yellow = draw; Red = away team win.

=== Results by round ===
Team ╲ Round	1	2	3	4	5	6	7	8	9	10	11	12	13	14	15	16	17	18	19	20	21	22
AEK Larnaca	D	W	D	W	W	W	W	W	L	D	W	W	D	L	D	W	D	D	D	D	L	W
AEL Limassol	L	W	D	L	W	W	D	L	L	D	L	L	L	W	L	D	L	W	W	L	W	L
Anorthosis Famagusta	W	L	W	L	W	L	L	W	W	L	D	L	W	W	W	W	W	D	D	D	W	D
APOEL	L	L	L	W	L	W	W	D	W	D	W	D	D	D	W	L	W	D	W	W	W	W
Apollon Limassol	W	W	W	W	L	L	W	W	W	W	D	W	L	D	W	L	W	W	W	W	D	D
Aris Limassol	W	L	D	W	W	W	L	W	W	L	D	W	W	D	L	W	W	D	L	D	L	D
Doxa Katokopias	D	W	L	D	D	L	L	D	L	D	W	L	L	W	W	D	L	D	L	L	L	W
Ethnikos Achna	L	L	L	D	L	L	D	L	L	L	W	L	W	L	L	L	L	L	D	W	L	D
Olympiakos Nicosia	L	W	D	L	W	D	W	L	D	W	L	L	D	L	D	L	L	D	L	W	L	D
Omonia	W	L	W	D	L	W	L	L	W	W	L	W	D	L	D	W	L	W	D	L	W	L
PAEEK	L	W	D	L	L	L	W	L	D	L	L	W	L	D	L	D	D	L	L	L	D	L
Pafos	W	L	D	D	D	D	L	W	L	W	D	D	W	W	D	D	W	L	W	D	W	D

Source: Cyprus Football Association
W = Win; D = Draw; L = Lose

== Championship round ==
=== Championship round table ===
Pos	Team	Pld	W	D	L	GF	GA	GD	Pts	Qualification	APOL	AEK	APOE	ARI	ANO	PAF
1	Apollon Limassol (C)	32	16	10	6	50	33	+17	58	Qualification for the Champions League third qualifying round	—	0–1	3–2	1–1	1–1	0–2
2	AEK Larnaca	32	14	12	6	44	29	+15	54	Qualification for the Champions League second qualifying round	3–3	—	1–2	1–1	1–0	2–0
3	APOEL	32	14	10	8	48	41	+7	52	Qualification for the Europa Conference League second qualifying round	0–0	1–1	—	1–1	1–1	2–1
4	Aris Limassol	32	13	11	8	37	32	+5	50	Qualification for the Europa Conference League second qualifying round	1–4	2–0	1–2	—	1–1	2–1
5	Anorthosis Famagusta	32	13	10	9	48	40	+8	49		1–1	1–3	4–1	0–3	—	1–0
6	Pafos	32	11	13	8	39	30	+9	46		0–0	2–0	3–1	1–1	2–2	—

Source: Cyprus Football Association
Legend: Blue = home team win; Yellow = draw; Red = away team win.
Rules for classification: 1) Points; 2) Head-to-head points; 3) Head-to-head goal difference; 4) Head-to-head goals scored; 5) Head-to-head away goals scored (only if two teams); 6) Goal difference; 7) Goals scored; 8) Play-off (only if deciding championship round, relegation round or relegation).
(C) Champions

== Relegation round ==
=== Relegation round table ===
Pos	Team	Pld	W	D	L	GF	GA	GD	Pts	Relegation	OMO	AEL	OLY	DOX	ETH	PAE
7	Omonia	32	14	8	10	44	38	+6	50	Qualification for the Europa League play-off round (Note: Omonia qualified for the Europa League play-off round as winners of the 2021–22 Cypriot Cup.)	—	3–2	1–1	2–2	1–0	4–2
8	AEL Limassol	32	14	5	13	43	39	+4	47		1–1	—	0–4	3–1	2–0	2–1
9	Olympiakos Nicosia	32	10	10	12	30	31	−1	40		3–0	0–1	—	1–0	1–1	4–3
10	Doxa Katokopias	32	7	11	14	27	41	−14	32		0–2	0–1	1–1	—	2–1	0–0
11	Ethnikos Achna (R)	32	5	8	19	21	41	−20	23	Relegation to Cypriot Second Division	0–0	1–2	1–0	0–0	—	0–0
12	PAEEK (R)	32	3	8	21	25	61	−36	17	Relegation to Cypriot Second Division	2–5	0–3	0–1	0–3	0–4	—

Source: Cyprus Football Association
Legend: Blue = home team win; Yellow = draw; Red = away team win.
Rules for classification: 1) Points; 2) Head-to-head points; 3) Head-to-head goal difference; 4) Head-to-head goals scored; 5) Head-to-head away goals scored (only if two teams); 6) Goal difference; 7) Goals scored; 8) Play-off (only if deciding champion or UEFA competitions).
(R) Relegated

== Season statistics ==
=== Top scorers ===
As of 22 May 2022

Rank	Player	Club	Goals
1	(North Macedonia) Ivan Trichkovski	AEK Larnaca	15
2	(Finland) Berat Sadik	Doxa Katokopias	13
3	(Greece) Lazaros Christodoulopoulos	Anorthosis Famagusta	10
3	(Georgia (country)) Giorgi Kvilitaia	APOEL	10
3	(Finland) Onni Valakari	Pafos	10
3	(Cyprus) Ioannis Pittas	Apollon Limassol	10
3	(Serbia) Stefan Šćepović	AEL Limassol	10
4	(France) Bagaliy Dabo	Apollon Limassol	9
4	(Egypt) Amr Warda	Anorthosis Famagusta	9
4	(Poland) Mariusz Stępiński	Aris Limassol	9
5	(Brazil) Jairo	Pafos	8
5	(Cyprus) Matija Špoljarić	Aris Limassol	8
6	(Cyprus) Fotis Papoulis	Omonia	7
6	(Serbia) Marko Šćepović	Omonia	7
6	(Slovakia) Michal Ďuriš	Ethnikos Achna / Omonia	7
