= 2020–21 Cypriot First Division =

Cyta Championship
- Season: 2020–21
- Dates: 21 August 2020 – 29 May 2021
- Champions: Omonia; 21st title
- Relegated: Enosis Neon Paralimni; Karmiotissa; Ermis Aradippou; Nea Salamis Famagusta
- UEFA Champions League: Omonia
- UEFA Europa League: Anorthosis
- UEFA Europa Conference League: Apollon; AEL
- Matches: 243
- Goals: 583 (2.4 per match)
- Top goalscorer: Championship Group: Nicolas Diguiny (17 goals); Relegation Group: Berat Sadik (18 goals)
- Biggest home win: Ermis Aradippou 7-1 Karmiotissa (17 May 2021)
- Biggest away win: Ermis Aradippou 0–6 Apollon Limassol (30 August 2020)
- Highest scoring: Nea Salamis Famagusta 4–3 Doxa Katokopias (2 January 2021)
- Longest unbeaten run: Omonia (20 matches)
- All statistics correct as of 5 May 2021.

The 2020–21 Cypriot First Division was the 82nd season of the Cypriot top-level football league.

== Stadiums and locations ==
Locations of the 2020–21 Cypriot First Division teams.

Note: Table lists clubs in alphabetical order.

Team	Location	Stadium	Capacity
AEK Larnaca	Larnaca	AEK Arena	7,400
AEL Limassol	Limassol	Tsirio Stadium	13,331
Anorthosis Famagusta	Famagusta	Antonis Papadopoulos Stadium	10,230
APOEL	Nicosia	GSP Stadium	22,859
Apollon Limassol	Limassol	Tsirio Stadium	13,331
Doxa Katokopias	Katokopia, Nicosia	Makario Stadium	16,000
Enosis Neon Paralimni	Paralimni, Famagusta	Tasos Markou Stadium	5,800
Ermis	Aradippou, Larnaca	Ammochostos Stadium	5,500
Ethnikos Achna	Achna, Famagusta	Dasaki Stadium	7,000
Karmiotissa	Pano Polemidia, Limassol	Stelios Kyriakides Stadium	9,394
Nea Salamis Famagusta	Famagusta	Ammochostos Stadium	5,500
Olympiakos Nicosia	Nicosia	Makario Stadium	16,000
Omonia	Nicosia	GSP Stadium	22,859
Pafos FC	Paphos	Stelios Kyriakides Stadium	9,394

== Personnel and kits ==
Note: Flags indicate national team as has been defined under FIFA eligibility rules. Players and Managers may hold more than one non-FIFA nationality.

Team	Head coach	Captain	Kit manufacturer	Shirt sponsor
AEK Larnaca	(Cyprus) Panagiotis Giannou	(North Macedonia) Ivan Trichkovski	Puma	Bet on Alfa
AEL Limassol	(Bosnia and Herzegovina) Dušan Kerkez	(Cyprus) Charis Kyriakou	Macron	Burisma Holdings
Anorthosis Famagusta	(Georgia (country)) Temur Ketsbaia	(Cyprus) Kostakis Artymatas	Nike	Allea Group
APOEL	(Cyprus) Savvas Poursaitidis	(Cyprus) Georgios Efrem	Macron	Pari-Match
Apollon Limassol	(Greece) Giannis Petrakis	(Cyprus) Giorgos Vasiliou	Puma	Stoiximan
Doxa Katokopias	(Cyprus) Angelos Efthymiou	(Finland) Berat Sadik	Nike	Victory Ammunition
EN Paralimni	(Greece) Sotiris Antoniou	(Slovenia) Gregor Balazic	Macron	
Ermis Aradippou	(Cyprus) Demetris Daskalakis	(Cyprus) Andreas Papathanasiou	Macron	
Ethnikos Achna	(Cyprus) Elias Charalambous	(North Macedonia) Martin Bogatinov	Jako	OPAP Cyprus
Karmiotissa	(Cyprus) Giannakis Pontikos	(Cyprus) Alkiviadis Christofi	Eldera	Cablenet
Nea Salamis Famagusta	(Cyprus) Constantinos Mina	(Slovakia) Róbert Veselovský	Nike	Vitex
Olympiakos Nicosia	(North Macedonia) Čedomir Janevski	(Cyprus) Evangelos Kyriakou	Jako	Office Pro
Omonia	(Norway) Henning Berg	(Spain) Jordi Gómez	Macron	Fonbet
Pafos FC	(England) Stephen Constantine	(Finland) Paulus Arajuuri	Jako	Korantina Homes

== Regular season ==
=== League table ===
Pos	Team	Pld	W	D	L	GF	GA	GD	Pts	Qualification or relegation
1	Omonia	26	16	8	2	43	13	+30	56	Qualification for the Championship round
2	AEL Limassol	26	17	4	5	45	23	+22	55	Qualification for the Championship round
3	Apollon Limassol	26	16	6	4	52	22	+30	54	Qualification for the Championship round
4	Anorthosis Famagusta	26	15	6	5	37	21	+16	51	Qualification for the Championship round
5	AEK Larnaca	26	12	5	9	36	25	+11	41	Qualification for the Championship round
6	Olympiakos Nicosia	26	10	4	12	27	38	−11	34	Qualification for the Championship round
7	Pafos FC	26	8	8	10	30	27	+3	32	Qualification for the Relegation round
8	APOEL	26	8	6	12	27	31	−4	30 (Note: Head-to-head goal difference: APOEL +1, Doxa -1)	Qualification for the Relegation round
9	Doxa Katokopias	26	7	9	10	24	32	−8	30	Qualification for the Relegation round
10	Nea Salamis Famagusta	26	8	5	13	29	38	−9	29	Qualification for the Relegation round
11	Enosis Neon Paralimni	26	6	6	14	22	39	−17	24 (Note: Head-to-head points: Enosis 4, Ermis 1)	Qualification for the Relegation round
12	Ermis Aradippou	26	5	9	12	18	38	−20	24	Qualification for the Relegation round
13	Ethnikos Achna	26	5	7	14	23	43	−20	22	Qualification for the Relegation round
14	Karmiotissa FC	26	3	9	14	22	45	−23	18	Qualification for the Relegation round

Source: Cyprus Football Association
Rules for classification: 1) Points; 2) Head-to-head points; 3) Head-to-head goal difference; 4) Head-to-head goals scored; 5) Head-to-head away goals scored (only if two teams); 6) Goal difference; 7) Goals scored; 8) Play-off (only if deciding championship round, relegation round or relegation).

=== Results ===
Home \ Away	AEK	AEL	ANO	APOE	APOL	DOX	ENP	ERM	ETH	KAR	NSF	OLY	OMO	PAF
AEK Larnaca	—	2–1	0–0	3–0	1–2	2–0	1–2	3–1	3–1	1–0	1–0	4–0	0–3	0–0
AEL Limassol	3–1	—	1–0	2–0	2–1	3–1	4–1	2–1	5–0	3–1	2–1	3–0	1–1	1–0
Anorthosis Famagusta	1–0	0–0	—	2–0	1–3	1–0	4–2	3–1	1–0	2–1	2–0	2–0	1–1	1–0
APOEL	1–1	1–0	0–0	—	1–1	2–0	0–2	3–0	2–3	2–2	3–1	0–1	0–3	0–1
Apollon Limassol	3–0	1–2	3–2	1–0	—	1–1	2–1	4–0	2–1	1–2	3–0	2–1	0–0	1–0
Doxa Katokopias	0–0	1–2	2–1	2–1	0–1	—	1–0	0–0	2–1	3–3	2–0	1–1	0–3	0–0
Enosis Neon Paralimni	2–1	1–0	1–2	0–2	1–5	0–0	—	1–0	0–0	2–2	1–3	1–2	0–1	0–0
Ermis Aradippou	0–2	2–2	1–1	0–0	0–6	2–1	1–1	—	0–0	2–0	1–2	0–1	0–2	1–1
Ethnikos Achna	0–3	1–2	0–1	0–0	1–4	0–1	2–0	0–2	—	2–1	1–1	1–3	1–2	2–1
Karmiotissa	0–0	0–1	1–1	1–0	1–1	1–1	2–1	0–1	1–1	—	0–1	0–3	1–5	0–0
Nea Salamis Famagusta	1–2	1–1	1–4	0–3	1–1	4–3	2–0	0–1	1–1	4–0	—	1–2	2–1	2–0
Olympiakos Nicosia	1–0	1–2	0–3	2–3	0–1	1–2	0–1	0–0	1–2	3–2	0–0	—	1–0	2–1
Omonia	2–1	3–0	3–0	1–0	2–1	0–0	0–0	0–0	2–0	1–0	2–0	1–1	—	2–1
Pafos FC	1–4	1–0	0–1	2–3	1–1	2–0	2–1	3–1	2–2	3–0	1–0	5–0	2–2	—

Source: Cyprus Football Association
Legend: Blue = home team win; Yellow = draw; Red = away team win.

=== Positions by Round ===
The table lists the positions of teams after each week of matches. In order to preserve chronological progress, any postponed matches are not included in the round at which they were originally scheduled, but added to the full round they were played immediately afterwards. For example, if a match is scheduled for round 13, but then postponed and played between rounds 16 and 17, it will be added to the standings for round 16.

Team ╲ Round	1	2	3	4	5	6	7	8	9	10	11	12	13	14	15	16	17	18	19	20	21	22	23	24	25	26
Omonia	1	6	6	3	5	2	2	4	6	5	5	7	6	5	4	4	3	3	3	2	2	3	3	2	1	1
AEL Limassol	4	3	5	2	3	5	5	5	3	3	3	2	1	2	3	2	2	1	2	4	3	2	1	3	2	2
Apollon Limassol	9	4	1	1	1	1	1	1	1	2	1	3	2	1	1	1	1	2	1	1	1	1	2	1	3	3
Anorthosis Famagusta	7	2	3	6	7	3	3	2	2	1	2	1	3	3	2	3	4	4	4	3	4	4	4	4	4	4
AEK Larnaca	3	1	2	4	2	4	4	3	4	6	6	5	4	4	5	5	5	5	5	5	5	5	5	5	5	5
Olympiakos Nicosia	12	8	9	8	4	6	6	6	5	4	4	4	5	6	6	6	6	8	9	9	9	9	7	8	6	6
Pafos	8	10	13	12	13	7	7	7	8	7	7	6	7	7	7	7	7	6	7	7	8	8	9	7	9	7
APOEL	5	11	7	7	8	9	9	10	10	11	9	8	9	9	9	9	11	11	10	10	10	10	10	9	7	8
Doxa Katokopias	10	5	4	5	6	8	8	8	7	8	8	9	8	8	8	8	8	7	6	6	6	6	6	6	8	9
Nea Salamis Famagusta	11	12	8	10	11	13	13	14	14	14	12	12	11	11	11	11	9	9	8	8	7	7	8	10	10	10
Enosis Neon Paralimni	14	13	14	14	14	14	14	13	13	13	14	14	14	14	14	14	14	14	13	11	11	11	11	11	11	11
Ermis Aradippou	13	14	11	11	12	10	10	9	9	9	10	10	10	10	10	10	10	10	11	12	12	12	12	12	12	12
Ethnikos Achna	2	7	10	9	10	12	12	12	12	12	13	13	13	13	13	13	13	13	14	14	14	14	13	13	13	13
Karmiotissa	6	9	12	13	9	11	11	11	11	10	11	11	12	12	12	12	12	12	12	13	13	13	14	14	14	14

Leader and Qualification to Championship round
Qualification to Championship round
Qualification to Relegation round

Source: worldfootball.net

== Championship round ==
=== Championship round table ===
Pos	Team	Pld	W	D	L	GF	GA	GD	Pts	Qualification	OMO	APOL	AEL	ANO	AEK	OLY
1	Omonia (C, Q)	36	23	10	3	55	17	+38	79	Qualification for the Champions League second qualifying round	—	1–1	2–1	0–0	1–0	2–0
2	Apollon Limassol (Q)	36	21	11	4	68	30	+38	74	Qualification for the Europa Conference League second qualifying round	1–0	—	0–0	1–1	3–1	2–2
3	AEL Limassol (Q)	36	21	5	10	58	34	+24	68	Qualification for the Europa Conference League second qualifying round	1–2	1–2	—	1–2	3–0	2–0
4	Anorthosis Famagusta (Q)	36	16	9	11	44	37	+7	57	Qualification for the Europa League third qualifying round (Note: Anorthosis Famagusta qualified for the Europa League third qualifying round as winners of the 2020–21 Cypriot Cup.)	0–2	2–2	1–2	—	0–2	0–2
5	AEK Larnaca	36	15	5	16	44	40	+4	50		0–1	0–2	0–1	2–1	—	2–1
6	Olympiakos Nicosia	36	14	5	17	38	51	−13	47		0–1	0–2	2–1	2–0	2–1	—

Source: Cyprus Football Association
Rules for classification: 1) Points; 2) Head-to-head points; 3) Head-to-head goal difference; 4) Head-to-head goals scored; 5) Head-to-head away goals scored (only if two teams); 6) Goal difference; 7) Goals scored; 8) Play-off (only if deciding championship round, relegation round or relegation).
(C) Champions; (Q) Qualified for the phase indicated

=== Positions by Round ===
Team ╲ Round	27	28	29	30	31	32	33	34	35	36
Omonia	1	1	1	1	1	1	1	1	1	1
Apollon Limassol	3	3	3	3	3	3	2	2	2	2
AEL Limassol	2	2	2	2	2	2	3	3	3	3
Anorthosis Famagusta	4	4	4	4	4	4	4	4	4	4
AEK Larnaca	5	5	5	5	5	5	5	5	5	5
Olympiakos Nicosia	6	6	6	6	6	6	6	6	6	6

Leader and Champions League second qualifying round
Europa Conference League second qualifying round
Europa League third qualifying round

Source: Cyprus Football Association

== Relegation round ==
=== Relegation round table ===
Pos	Team	Pld	W	D	L	GF	GA	GD	Pts	Relegation	PAF	APOE	ETH	DOX	NSF	ERM	ENP	KAR
7	Pafos FC	40	18	9	13	58	38	+20	63		—	1–1	1–2	2–1	3–0	3–1	2–0	2–1
8	APOEL	40	17	9	14	48	39	+9	60		0–1	—	2–0	1–0	0–0	2–0	1–0	2–0
9	Ethnikos Achna	40	14	10	16	48	56	−8	52		0–2	1–1	—	2–1	2–2	2–0	1–0	5–0
10	Doxa Katokopias	40	13	12	15	46	43	+3	51		1–0	1–2	0–1	—	0–0	1–1	1–0	6–1
11	Nea Salamis Famagusta (R)	40	11	10	19	48	61	−13	43	Relegation to Cypriot Second Division	1–2	1–2	0–2	1–4	—	3–1	1–2	1–1
12	Ermis Aradippou (R)	40	9	11	20	40	61	−21	38	Relegation to Cypriot Second Division	1–2	2–0	1–2	0–1	1–2	—	4–2	7–1
13	Enosis Neon Paralimni (R)	40	8	10	22	35	61	−26	34	Relegation to Cypriot Second Division	2–1	0–1	1–1	0–0	3–3	0–1	—	1–1
14	Karmiotissa (R)	40	4	12	24	36	98	−62	24	Relegation to Cypriot Second Division	0–6	1–6	2–4	0–5	0–4	2–2	4–2	—

Source: Cyprus Football Association
Rules for classification: 1) Points; 2) Head-to-head points; 3) Head-to-head goal difference; 4) Head-to-head goals scored; 5) Head-to-head away goals scored (only if two teams); 6) Goal difference; 7) Goals scored; 8) Play-off (only if deciding champion or UEFA competitions).
(R) Relegated

=== Positions by Round ===
The table lists the positions of teams after each week of matches. In order to preserve chronological progress, any postponed matches are not included in the round at which they were originally scheduled, but added to the full round they were played immediately afterwards. For example, if a match is scheduled for round 3, but then postponed and played between rounds 6 and 7, it will be added to the standings for round 6.

Team ╲ Round	27	28	29	30	31	32	33	34	35	36	37	38	39	40
Pafos FC	7	7	8	8	8	8	8	7	7	7	7	7	7	7
APOEL	8	8	7	7	7	7	7	8	8	8	8	8	8	8
Ethnikos Achna	13	13	12	11	10	9	9	10	10	10	9	9	9	9
Doxa Katokopias	9	10	9	9	9	10	10	9	9	9	10	10	10	10
Nea Salamis Famagusta	10	9	10	10	11	11	11	11	11	11	11	11	11	11
Ermis Aradippou	12	12	11	12	12	12	12	13	13	12	12	12	12	12
Enosis Neon Paralimni	11	11	13	13	13	13	13	12	12	13	13	13	13	13
Karmiotissa	14	14	14	14	14	14	14	14	14	14	14	14	14	14

Relegation to Cypriot Second Division

Source: Cyprus Football Association

== Season statistics ==
=== Top scorers ===
As of 29 May 2021.

Rank	Player	Club	Goals
1	(Finland) Berat Sadik	Doxa Katokopias	18
2	(France) Nicolas Diguiny	Apollon Limassol	17
2	(Cyprus) Onisiforos Roushias	Ermis Aradippou	17
2	(Czech Republic) Tomáš Wágner	Nea Salamis Famagusta	17
5	(North Macedonia) Ivan Trichkovski	AEK Larnaca	16
6	(Georgia (country)) Giorgi Kvilitaia	Anorthosis Famagusta	14
6	(Belgium) Ryan Mmaee	AEL Limassol	14
8	(Finland) Onni Valakari	Pafos	13
8	(Cyprus) Ioannis Pittas	Apollon Limassol	13
8	(Brazil) Danilo	Nea Salamis Famagusta	13
8	(France) Kévin Bérigaud	Pafos	13
