= Cyprus national football team results (2020–present) =

- Win Draw Loss

This article provides details of international football games played by the Cyprus national football team from 2020 to present.

== Results ==
Key
Win
Draw
Defeat

=== 2020 ===
31 March 2020 Friendly	Cyprus	Cancelled	Sweden

5 September 2020 2020–21 Nations League	Cyprus	0–2	Montenegro	Nicosia, Cyprus
19:00 UTC+3		Report	Jovetić 60', 73'	Stadium: GSP Stadium; Attendance: 0 (Note: Due to the COVID-19 pandemic in Europe, all matches scheduled for September 2020 were played behind closed doors.); Referee: Harm Osmers (Germany)

8 September 2020 2020–21 Nations League	Cyprus	0–1	Azerbaijan	Nicosia, Cyprus
21:45 UTC+3		Report	Medvedev 29'	Stadium: GSP Stadium; Attendance: 0 Referee: Filip Glova (Slovakia)

7 October 2020 Friendly	Cyprus	1–2	Czech Republic	Larnaca, Cyprus
19:00 UTC+3	Loizou 32'	Report	Holeš 13'; Darida 43' (pen.)	Stadium: AEK Arena; Attendance: 0 Referee: Lionel Tschudi (Switzerland)

10 October 2020 2020–21 Nations League	Luxembourg	2–0	Cyprus	Luxembourg City, Luxembourg
15:00 UTC+2	Sinani 12', 26'	Report		Stadium: Stade Josy Barthel; Attendance: 1,334; Referee: Don Robertson (Scotland)

13 October 2020 2020–21 Nations League	Azerbaijan	0–0	Cyprus	Elbasan, Albania
21:00 UTC+2		Report		Stadium: Elbasan Arena (Note: The Azerbaijan v Cyprus match, originally scheduled to be played at Olympic Stadium, Baku, was later moved to the neutral Elbasan Arena, Elbasan, due to the Nagorno-Karabakh conflict.); Attendance: 0 Referee: Fran Jović (Croatia)

11 November 2020 Friendly	Greece	2–1	Cyprus	Athens, Greece
16:45 UTC+2	Tzolis 8'; Giakoumakis 17'	Report	Elia 58'	Stadium: Georgios Kamaras Stadium; Attendance: 0 Referee: Harm Osmers (Germany)

14 November 2020 2020–21 Nations League	Cyprus	2–1	Luxembourg	Nicosia, Cyprus
19:00 UTC+3	Kastanos 34' (pen.), 71'	Report	Kousoulos 5' (o.g.)	Stadium: GSP Stadium; Attendance: 0 Referee: Mattias Gestranius (Finland)

17 November 2020 2020–21 Nations League	Montenegro	4–0	Cyprus	Podgorica, Montenegro
20:45 UTC+2	Jovetić 14'; Boljević 25', 28'; Mugoša 60'	Report		Stadium: City Stadium; Attendance: 0 Referee: Eitan Shemeulevitch (Israel)

=== 2021 ===
24 March 2021 2022 World Cup qualification	Cyprus	0–0	Slovakia	Nicosia, Cyprus
21:45 UTC+3		Report		Stadium: GSP Stadium; Attendance: 0 Referee: Aleksandar Stavrev (North Macedonia)

27 March 2021 2022 World Cup qualification	Croatia	1–0	Cyprus	Rijeka, Croatia
18:00 UTC+2	Pašalić 40'	Report		Stadium: Stadion Rujevica; Attendance: 0 Referee: Kristo Tohver (Estonia)

30 March 2021 2022 World Cup qualification	Cyprus	1–0	Slovenia	Nicosia, Cyprus
19:00 UTC+3	Pittas 42'	Report		Stadium: GSP Stadium; Attendance: 0 Referee: Andreas Ekberg (Sweden)

4 June 2021 Friendly	Hungary	1–0	Cyprus	Budapest, Hungary
20:00 UTC+2	Schäfer 36'	Report		Stadium: Szusza Ferenc Stadion; Attendance: 7,500; Referee: Matej Jug (Slovenia)

7 June 2021 Friendly	Ukraine	4–0	Cyprus	Kharkiv, Ukraine
18:00 UTC+3	Yarmolenko 37' (pen.), 65'; Zinchenko 45+2' (pen.); Yaremchuk 59'	Report		Stadium: Metalist Oblast Sports Complex; Attendance: 18,000; Referee: Vitālijs Spasjoņņikovs (Latvia)
Note: The match originally scheduled for 26 May 2020, at the Metalist Stadium, Kharkiv was postponed due to the COVID-19 pandemic, and was later rescheduled to 7 June 2021.

1 September 2021 2022 World Cup qualification	Malta	3–0	Cyprus	Ta' Qali, Malta
20:45 UTC+2	Attard 44', 54'; J. Mbong 46'	Report		Stadium: National Stadium; Attendance: 2,686; Referee: Fabio Maresca (Italy)

4 September 2021 2022 World Cup qualification	Cyprus	0–2	Russia	Nicosia, Cyprus
16:00 UTC+3		Report	Yerokhin 6'; Zhemaletdinov 55'	Stadium: GSP Stadium; Attendance: 1,645; Referee: Alejandro Hernández (Spain)

7 September 2021 2022 World Cup qualification	Slovakia	2–0	Cyprus	Bratislava, Slovakia
20:45 UTC+2	Schranz 55'; Koscelník 77'	Report		Stadium: Tehelné pole Attendance: 6,762; Referee: Aliyar Aghayev (Azerbaijan)

8 October 2021 2022 World Cup qualification	Cyprus	0–3	Croatia	Larnaca, Cyprus
21:45 UTC+3		Report	Perišić 45+2'; Gvardiol 80'; Livaja 90+2'	Stadium: AEK Arena – Georgios Karapatakis; Attendance: 2,333; Referee: Michael Oliver (England)

11 October 2021 2022 World Cup qualification	Cyprus	2–2	Malta	Larnaca, Cyprus
21:45 UTC+3	Papoulis 7'; Sotiriou 80'	Report	Muscat 53'; Degabriele 90+8'	Stadium: AEK Arena – Georgios Karapatakis; Attendance: 1,405; Referee: Dennis Higler (Netherlands)

11 November 2021 2022 World Cup qualification	Russia	6–0	Cyprus	Saint Petersburg, Russia
20:00 UTC+3	Yerokhin 4', 87'; Smolov 55'; Mostovoy 56'; Sutormin 62'; Zabolotny 82'	Report		Stadium: Krestovsky Stadium; Attendance: 10,108; Referee: Daniel Stefanski (Poland)

14 November 2021 2022 World Cup qualification	Slovenia	2–1	Cyprus	Ljubljana, Slovenia
15:00 UTC+1	Zajc 48'; Gnezda Čerin 84'	Report	Kakoullis 89'	Stadium: Stožice Stadium; Attendance: 5,117; Referee: Sergey Ivanov (Russia)

=== 2022 ===
24 March 2022 2020–21 Nations League play-outs	Estonia	0–0	Cyprus	Tallinn, Estonia
19:00 UTC+3		Report		Stadium: A. Le Coq Arena; Attendance: 5,366; Referee: Willie Collum (Scotland)

29 March 2022 2020–21 Nations League play-outs	Cyprus	2–0 (2–0 agg.)	Estonia	Larnaca, Cyprus
19:00 UTC+3	Tzionis 19'; Sotiriou 51'	Report		Stadium: AEK Arena – Georgios Karapatakis; Attendance: 2,464; Referee: Artur Soares Dias (Portugal)

2 June 2022 2022–23 Nations League	Cyprus	0–2	Kosovo	Larnaca, Cyprus
21:45 UTC+3		Report	Berisha 65'; Zhegrova 78'	Stadium: AEK Arena – Georgios Karapatakis; Attendance: 1,550; Referee: Jérôme Brisard (France)

5 June 2022 2022–23 Nations League	Cyprus	0–0	Northern Ireland	Larnaca, Cyprus
19:00 UTC+3		Report		Stadium: AEK Arena – Georgios Karapatakis; Attendance: 1,663; Referee: Enea Jorgji (Albania)

9 June 2022 2022–23 Nations League	Greece	3–0	Cyprus	Volos, Greece
21:45 UTC+3	Bakasetas 8'; Pavlidis 20'; Limnios 48'	Report		Stadium: Panthessaliko Stadium; Attendance: 12,418; Referee: Tamás Bognár (Hungary)

12 June 2022 2022–23 Nations League	Northern Ireland	2–2	Cyprus	Belfast, Northern Ireland
14:00 UTC+1	McNair 71'; J. Evans 90+4'	Report	Kakoullis 32', 51'	Stadium: Windsor Park; Attendance: 16,454; Referee: Ricardo de Burgos Bengoetxea (Spain)

24 September 2022 2022–23 Nations League	Cyprus	1–0	Greece	Larnaca, Cyprus
21:45 UTC+3	Tzionis 18'	Report		Stadium: AEK Arena – Georgios Karapatakis; Attendance: 4,548; Referee: Aleksei Kulbakov (Belarus)

27 September 2022 2022–23 Nations League	Kosovo	5–1	Cyprus	Pristina, Kosovo
14:00 UTC+1	Muslija 22'; Rrudhani 45+1'; Rashani 47'; Muriqi 52', 84'	Report	Roberge 81'	Stadium: Fadil Vokrri Stadium; Attendance: 10,400; Referee: Kristo Tohver (Estonia)

16 November 2022 Friendly	Cyprus	0–2	Bulgaria	Larnaca, Cyprus
20:45 UTC+2		Report	Despodov 24'; Delev 71'	Stadium: AEK Arena – Georgios Karapatakis; Attendance: 1,000; Referee: Trustin Farrugia Cann (Malta)

20 November 2022 Friendly	Israel	2–3	Cyprus	Petah Tikva, Israel
18:45 UTC+2	Gloukh 66'; Baribo 67'	Report	Charalambous 2'; Pittas 24'; Ioannou 82'	Stadium: HaMoshava Stadium; Attendance: 7.352; Referee: Arda Kardeşler (Turkey)

=== 2023 ===
25 March 2023 Euro 2024 qualifying	Scotland	3–0	Cyprus	Glasgow, Scotland
14:00 UTC+0	McGinn 21'; McTominay 87', 90+3'	Report		Stadium: Hampden Park; Attendance: 48,195; Referee: Duje Strukan (Croatia)

28 March 2023 Friendly	Armenia	2–2	Cyprus	Yerevan, Armenia
20:00 UTC+4	Ranos 50', 59'	Report	Karo 43'; Christofi 83'	Stadium: Vazgen Sargsyan Republican Stadium; Referee: Dumitru Muntean (Moldova)

17 June 2023 Euro 2024 qualifying	Cyprus	1–2	Georgia	Larnaca, Cyprus
21:45 UTC+3	Pittas 40' (pen.)	Report	Mikautadze 31'; Davitashvili 84'	Stadium: AEK Arena; Attendance: 3,763; Referee: Fábio Veríssimo (Portugal)

20 June 2023 Euro 2024 qualifying	Norway	3–1	Cyprus	Oslo, Norway
20:45 UTC+2	Solbakken 12'; Haaland 56' (pen.), 60'	Report	Kastanos 90+3'	Stadium: Ullevaal Stadion; Attendance: 23,643; Referee: Aleksandar Stavrev (North Macedonia)

8 September 2023 Euro 2024 qualifying	Cyprus	0–3	Scotland	Larnaca, Cyprus
21:45 UTC+3		Report	McTominay 6'; Porteous 16'; McGinn 30'	Stadium: AEK Arena; Attendance: 6,633; Referee: Balázs Berke (Hungary)

12 September 2023 Euro 2024 qualifying	Spain	6–0	Cyprus	Granada, Spain
20:45 UTC+2	Gavi 18'; Merino 33'; Joselu 70'; Torres 73', 83'; Baena 77'	Report		Stadium: Nuevo Los Cármenes; Attendance: 17,311; Referee: Simone Sozza (Italy)

12 October 2023 Euro 2024 qualifying	Cyprus	0–4	Norway	Larnaca, Cyprus
21:45 UTC+3		Report	Sørloth 33'; Haaland 65', 72'; Aursnes 81'	Stadium: AEK Arena; Attendance: 7,206; Referee: Donatas Rumšas (Lithuania)

15 October 2023 Euro 2024 qualifying	Georgia	4–0	Cyprus	Tbilisi, Georgia
17:00 UTC+4	Kiteishvili 46'; Kvaratskhelia 58'; Shengelia 82'; Mikautadze 90+5' (pen.)	Report		Stadium: Boris Paichadze Dinamo Arena; Attendance: 15,871; Referee: Robert Jones (England)

16 November 2023 Euro 2024 qualifying	Cyprus	1–3	Spain	Limassol, Cyprus
19:00 UTC+2	Pileas 75'	Report	Yamal 5'; Oyarzabal 22'; Joselu 28'	Stadium: Alphamega Stadium; Attendance: 9,667; Referee: Mykola Balakin (Ukraine)

19 November 2023 Friendly	Cyprus	1–0	Lithuania	Limassol, Cyprus
18:00 UTC+2	Pittas 22'	Report		Stadium: Alphamega Stadium; Attendance: 1,169; Referee: Marcel Birsan (Romania)

=== 2024 ===
21 March 2024 Friendly	Cyprus	1–1	Latvia	Larnaca, Cyprus
19:00 UTC+2	Pittas 34'	Report	Cigaņiks 85'	Stadium: AEK Arena; Referee: Lukas Fähndrich (Switzerland)

25 March 2024 Friendly	Cyprus	0–1	Serbia	Larnaca, Cyprus
19:00 UTC+2		Report	Milinković-Savić 7'	Stadium: AEK Arena; Attendance: 1,938; Referee: Marco Di Bello (Italy)

8 June 2024 Friendly	Moldova	3–2	Cyprus	Chișinău, Moldova
19:00 UTC+3	Moțpan 44'; Stînă 71'; Bogaciuc 78'	Report	Špoljarić 51'; Pittas 53'	Stadium: Stadionul Zimbru; Attendance: 1,938; Referee: Denys Shurman (Ukraine)

11 June 2024 Friendly	San Marino	1–4	Cyprus	Serravalle, San Marino
18:00 UTC+2	Giocondi 81'	Report	Satsaias 45+2'; Kastanos 53', 54'; Kakoullis 83'	Stadium: San Marino Stadium; Attendance: 358; Referee: Ishmael Barbara (Malta)

6 September 2024 2024–25 Nations League	Lithuania	0–1	Cyprus	Kaunas, Lithuania
20:45		Report	Pittas 34'	Stadium: Darius and Girėnas Stadium; Attendance: 4,905; Referee: Igor Pajac (Croatia)

9 September 2024 2024–25 Nations League	Cyprus	0–4	Kosovo	Larnaca, Cyprus
21:45		Report	Muriqi 9' (pen.), 21'; Al. Rrahmani 48'; Dellova 55'	Stadium: AEK Arena - Georgios Karapatakis; Attendance: 2,041; Referee: Sebastian Gishamer (Austria)

12 October 2024 2024–25 Nations League	Cyprus	0–3	Romania	Larnaca, Cyprus
21:45		Report	Man 16'; R. Marin 25' (pen.); Drăgușin 36'	Stadium: AEK Arena - Georgios Karapatakis; Attendance: 6,092; Referee: Sascha Stegemann (Germany)

15 October 2024 2024–25 Nations League	Kosovo	3–0	Cyprus	Pristina, Kosovo
20:45	Rrahmani 30'; Krasniqi 52'; Sahiti 70'	Report		Stadium: Fadil Vokrri Stadium; Attendance: 12,863; Referee: Matej Jug (Slovenia)

15 November 2024 2024–25 Nations League	Cyprus	2–1	Lithuania	Larnaca, Cyprus
21:45	Kastanos 18'; Tzionis 63'	Report	Gineitis 47'	Stadium: AEK Arena - Georgios Karapatakis; Attendance: 1,733; Referee: Nenad Minaković (Serbia)

18 November 2024 2024–25 Nations League	Romania	4–1	Cyprus	Bucharest, Romania
21:45	Bîrligea 2'; R. Marin 41', 80'; Coman 83'	Report	Pittas 52'	Stadium: Arena Națională; Attendance: 45,318; Referee: Luca Pairetto (Italy)

=== 2025 ===
21 March 2025 2026 World Cup qualification	Cyprus	2–0	San Marino	Larnaca, Cyprus
19:00 EET	Pittas 55'; Kakoullis 86'	Report		Stadium: AEK Arena; Attendance: 2,336; Referee: Andris Treimanis (Latvia)

24 March 2025 2026 World Cup qualification	Bosnia and Herzegovina	2–1	Cyprus	Zenica, Bosnia and Herzegovina
20:45	Demirović 22'; Hajradinović 56'	Report	Pittas 45+2'	Stadium: Stadion Bilino Polje; Attendance: 7,464; Referee: Rohit Saggi (Norway)

6 June 2025 Friendly	Bulgaria	2–2	Cyprus	Plovdiv, Bulgaria
19:00	Kolev 27', 61' (pen.)	Report	Koutsakos 42'; Laifis 86'	Stadium: Hristo Botev Stadium; Attendance: 2,000; Referee: Igor Stojchevski (North Macedonia)

10 June 2025 2026 World Cup qualification	Romania	2–0	Cyprus	Bucharest, Romania
21:45	Tănase 43'; Man 45+2'	Report		Stadium: National Arena; Attendance: 43,524; Referee: Donatas Rumšas (Lithuania)

6 September 2025 2026 World Cup qualification	Austria	1–0	Cyprus	Linz, Austria
20:45	Sabitzer 54' (pen.)	Report		Stadium: Raiffeisen Arena; Attendance: 16,300; Referee: Jakob Kehlet (Denmark)

9 September 2025 2026 World Cup qualification	Cyprus	2–2	Romania	Nicosia, Cyprus
21:45	Loizou 29'; Charalampous 76'	Report	Drăguș 2', 18'	Stadium: GSP Stadium; Attendance: 4,875; Referee: Matej Jug (Slovenia)

9 October 2025 2026 World Cup qualification	Cyprus	2–2	Bosnia and Herzegovina	Larnaca, Cyprus
21:45	Laifis 45+1'; Pittas 90+7' (pen.)	Report	Katić 10'; Michail 36' (o.g.)	Stadium: AEK Arena; Attendance: 2,355; Referee: Lawrence Visser (Belgium)

12 October 2025 2026 World Cup qualification	San Marino	0–4	Cyprus	Serravalle, San Marino
15:00		Report	Loizou 09'; Andreou 59'; Kastanos 67' (pen.); Kakoullis 79'	Stadium: San Marino Stadium; Attendance: 598; Referee: Aliyar Aghayev (Azerbaijan)

15 November 2025 2026 World Cup qualification	Cyprus	0–2	Austria	Limassol, Cyprus
19:00		Report	Arnautović 18' (pen.), 55'	Stadium: Alphamega Stadium; Attendance: 6,012; Referee: Urs Schnyder (Switzerland)

18 November 2025 Friendly	Cyprus	2–4	Estonia	Limassol, Cyprus
21:45 (UTC+3)	Andreou 16'; Kakoullis 48'	Report	Kyprianou 44' (o.g.); Sappinen 78', 83', 87'	Stadium: Alphamega Stadium; Referee: Orel Grinfeld (Israel)

=== 2026 ===
26 March 2026 Friendly	Cyprus	0–1	Belarus	Nicosia, Cyprus
19:00 (UTC+2)		Report	Tikhomirov 25'	Stadium: GSP Stadium; Attendance: 500; Referee: Miloš Milanović (Serbia)

30 March 2026 Friendly	Cyprus	3–2	Moldova	Nicosia, Cyprus
19:00 (UTC+3)	Kastanos 5'; Charalampous 30', 44'	Report	P. Popescu 55'; Stînă 88'	Stadium: GSP Stadium; Referee: Marian Barbu (Romania)

4 June 2026 Friendly	Slovenia	1–1	Cyprus	Ljubljana, Slovenia
18:00 (UTC+2)	Drkušić 65'	Report	Tzionis 7'	Stadium: Stožice Stadium; Attendance: 9,023; Referee: Patrik Kolarić (Croatia)

7 June 2026 Friendly	Liechtenstein	0–2	Cyprus	Vaduz, Liechtenstein
15:00 (UTC+2)		Report	Tzionis 28'; Sotiriou 70'	Stadium: Rheinpark Stadion; Attendance: 878; Referee: Anojen Kanagasingam (Switzerland)

25 September 2026 2026–27 Nations League	Montenegro	2–1	Cyprus	Podgorica, Montenegro
20:45 UTC+2	Krstović 66' (pen.); Osmajić 86'	Report	Edwards 55'	Stadium: Podgorica City Stadium; Attendance: 6,726; Referee: Daniele Chiffi (Italy)

28 September 2026 2026–27 Nations League	Latvia	0–0	Cyprus	Riga, Latvia
20:45 UTC+2		Report		Stadium: Skonto Stadium; Attendance: 6,069; Referee: Michal Očenáš (Slovakia)

2 October 2026 2026–27 Nations League	Cyprus	2–0	Armenia	Nicosia, Cyprus
21:45 UTC+3	Konomis 19'; Kakoullis 31'	Report		Stadium: GSP Stadium; Attendance: 3,456; Referee: Mohammad Al-Emara (Finland)

5 October 2026 2026–27 Nations League	Cyprus	2–1	Latvia	Nicosia, Cyprus
21:45 UTC+3	Kosti 70'; Edwards 90+4'	Report	Dašķevičs 57'	Stadium: GSP Stadium; Attendance: 2,354; Referee: Giorgi Kruashvili (Georgia)

12 November 2026 2026–27 Nations League	Armenia	1–1	Cyprus	Yerevan, Armenia
21:00 UTC+4	Garibyan 58'	Report	Pikis 9'	Stadium: Vazgen Sargsyan Republican Stadium; Attendance: 7,000; Referee: Orel Grinfeld (Israel)

15 November 2026 2026–27 Nations League	Cyprus	1–4	Montenegro	Limassol, Cyprus
16:00 UTC+2	Pittas 52' (pen.)	Report	Osmajić 5'; Vukotić 58'; Krstović 67', 83'	Stadium: Alphamega Stadium; Attendance: 5,695; Referee: Sander van der Eijk (Netherlands)

== Head to head records ==
Last updated 15 November 2026 after match against Montenegro

Head to head records
Opponent	P	W	D	L	GF	GA	W%	D%	L%
Armenia	3	1	2	0	5	3	33.33	66.67	0
Austria	2	0	0	2	0	3	0	0	100
Azerbaijan	2	0	1	1	0	1	0	50	50
Belarus	1	0	0	1	0	1	0	0	100
Bosnia and Herzegovina	2	0	1	1	3	4	0	50	50
Bulgaria	2	0	1	1	2	4	0	50	50
Croatia	2	0	0	2	0	4	0	0	100
Czech Republic	1	0	0	1	1	2	0	0	100
Estonia	3	1	1	1	4	4	33.33	33.33	33.33
Georgia	2	0	0	2	1	6	0	0	100
Greece	3	1	0	2	2	5	33.33	0	66.67
Hungary	1	0	0	1	0	1	0	0	100
Israel	1	1	0	0	3	2	100	0	0
Kosovo	4	0	0	4	1	14	0	0	100
Latvia	3	1	2	0	3	2	33.33	66.67	0
Liechtenstein	1	1	0	0	2	0	100	0	0
Lithuania	3	3	0	0	4	1	100	0	0
Luxembourg	2	1	0	1	2	3	50	0	50
Malta	2	0	1	1	2	5	0	50	50
Moldova	2	1	0	1	5	5	50	0	50
Montenegro	4	0	0	4	2	12	0	0	100
Northern Ireland	2	0	2	0	2	2	0	100	0
Norway	2	0	0	2	1	7	0	0	100
Romania	4	0	1	3	3	11	0	25	75
Russia	2	0	0	2	0	8	0	0	100
San Marino	3	3	0	0	10	1	100	0	0
Serbia	1	0	0	1	0	1	0	0	100
Scotland	2	0	0	2	0	6	0	0	100
Slovakia	2	0	1	1	0	2	0	50	50
Slovenia	3	1	1	1	3	3	33.33	33.33	33.33
Spain	2	0	0	2	1	9	0	0	100
Ukraine	1	0	0	1	0	4	0	0	0
Totals	70	15	14	41	62	136	21.43	20	58.57
