= 2024–25 AC Omonia season =

AC Omonia
2024–25 season
- Head coach: Valdas Dambrauskas (until 29 November); Giannis Anastasiou (from 30 November)
- Stadium: GSP Stadium
- Cypriot First Division: 3rd
- Cypriot Cup: Semi-finals
- UEFA Conference League: Knockout phase play-offs
- Top goalscorer: League: Mariusz Stępiński (12); All: Mariusz Stępiński (17)
- Average home league attendance: 7,875

The 2024–25 season was the 77th season in the history of AC Omonia, and the club's 72nd consecutive season in the Cypriot First Division. In addition to the domestic league, the club participated in the Cypriot Cup and the UEFA Conference League.

== Transfers ==
=== In ===
Pos.	Player	Transferred from	Fee	Date	Source
MF	(Cyprus) Loizos Loizou	(Netherlands) SC Heerenveen	Loan return	30 June 2024	
DF	(Sweden) Filip Helander	(Denmark) Odense BK	Free	1 July 2024	

== Friendlies ==
=== Pre-season ===
6 July 2024 Friendly	Cracovia	3–0	Omonia	Białobrzegi
18:00 UTC+2	Atanasov 23' (pen.); Bzdyl 78'; Bochnak 90'			Stadium: Stadion Miejski

9 July 2024 Friendly	Maccabi Tel Aviv	2–0	Omonia	Busko-Zdrój, Poland
				Stadium: Stadion AKS Busko

12 July 2024 Friendly	Raków Częstochowa	2–0	Omonia
17:00	Crnac 9'; Makuch 33'

18 July 2024 Friendly	Omonia	1–1	AEK Athens
19:00	Simić 80'		Vida 69'

== Competitions ==
=== Overall record ===
Competition	First match	Last match	Starting round	Record							
Competition	First match	Last match	Starting round	Pld	W	D	L	GF	GA	GD	Win %
Cypriot First Division			Matchday 1	21	13	3	5	43	19	+24	61.90
Cypriot Cup				2	2	0	0	10	0	+10	100.00
UEFA Conference League	25 July 2024		Second qualifying round	13	7	2	4	22	11	+11	53.85
Total				36	22	5	9	75	30	+45	61.11

Last updated: 1 August 2024
Source: Soccerway

=== Cypriot First Division ===
==== League table ====
Pos	Team	Pld	W	D	L	GF	GA	GD	Pts	Qualification or relegation
2	Aris Limassol	26	18	7	1	53	15	+38	61	Qualification for the Championship round
3	AEK Larnaca	26	16	6	4	45	21	+24	54	Qualification for the Championship round
4	Omonia	26	16	4	6	53	26	+27	52	Qualification for the Championship round
5	APOEL	26	12	7	7	52	25	+27	43	Qualification for the Championship round
6	Apollon Limassol	26	11	7	8	28	23	+5	40	Qualification for the Championship round

Source: Soccerway
Rules for classification: 1) Points; 2) Head-to-head points; 3) Head-to-head goal difference; 4) Head-to-head goals scored; 5) Head-to-head away goals scored (only if two teams); 6) Goal difference; 7) Goals scored; 8) Play-off (only if deciding championship round, relegation round or relegation).

Pos	Team	Pld	W	D	L	GF	GA	GD	Pts	Qualification	PAF	ARI	OMO	AEK	APO	APL
1	Pafos (C)	36	26	4	6	67	21	+46	82	Qualification for the Champions League second qualifying round	—	4–0	3–1	2–0	0–1	2–0
2	Aris Limassol	36	22	9	5	66	31	+35	75	Qualification for the Conference League second qualifying round	0–1	—	3–3	1–0	1–0	2–1
3	Omonia	36	20	8	8	69	40	+29	68	Qualification for the Conference League second qualifying round	3–0	2–1	—	1–1	2–1	1–0
4	AEK Larnaca	36	19	11	6	58	30	+28	68	Qualification for the Europa League first qualifying round (Note: The winner of the 2024–25 Cypriot Cup (AEK Larnaca) qualified for the Europa League first qualifying round.)	2–2	1–1	1–1	—	3–0	3–0
5	APOEL	36	14	11	11	59	36	+23	53		1–1	2–1	1–1	0–1	—	1–1
6	Apollon Limassol	36	12	10	14	37	39	−2	46		1–2	2–3	3–1	1–1	0–0	—

Source: Soccerway
Legend: Blue = home team win; Yellow = draw; Red = away team win.
Rules for classification: 1) Points; 2) Head-to-head points; 3) Head-to-head goal difference; 4) Head-to-head goals scored; 5) Head-to-head away goals scored (only if two teams); 6) Goal difference; 7) Goals scored; 8) Play-off (only if deciding championship round, relegation round or relegation).
(C) Champions
Notes:

Pos	Team	Pld	W	D	L	GF	GA	GD	Pts	Relegation	ANO	ETH	AEL	ENO	OAR	KAR	NEA	PAC
1	Anorthosis Famagusta	33	15	7	11	50	42	+8	52		—	2–0	—	1–2	1–2	—	—	4–2
2	Ethnikos Achna	33	9	12	12	44	53	−9	39		—	—	2–0	—	—	2–1	1–1	3–1
3	AEL Limassol	33	11	6	16	38	53	−15	39		1–3	—	—	2–0	—	1–0	—	—
4	Enosis Neon Paralimni	33	10	5	18	31	48	−17	35		—	4–2	—	—	1–0	—	2–2	—
5	Omonia Aradippou	33	10	5	18	32	58	−26	35		—	2–1	1–2	—	—	—	0–2	4–1
6	Karmiotissa (R)	33	9	7	17	30	57	−27	34	Relegation to the Cypriot Second Division	0–1	—	—	0–2	1–0	—	—	2–0
7	Nea Salamis Famagusta (R)	33	6	8	19	31	62	−31	26	Relegation to the Cypriot Second Division	2–4	—	1–3	—	—	0–0	—	—
8	Omonia 29M (R)	33	3	5	25	23	65	−42	14	Relegation to the Cypriot Second Division	—	—	0–3	0–2	—	—	0–1	—

Source: Soccerway
Legend: Blue = home team win; Yellow = draw; Red = away team win.
Rules for classification: 1) Points; 2) Head-to-head points; 3) Head-to-head goal difference; 4) Head-to-head goals scored; 5) Head-to-head away goals scored (only if two teams); 6) Goal difference; 7) Goals scored; 8) Play-off (only if deciding championship round, relegation round or relegation).
(R) Relegated

==== Results summary ====
Overall								Home						Away					
Pld	W	D	L	GF	GA	GD	Pts	W	D	L	GF	GA	GD	W	D	L	GF	GA	GD
17	10	2	5	34	19	+15	32	5	2	2	16	8	+8	5	0	3	18	11	+7

Last updated: 7 January 2025.
Source: soccerway

===== Results by round =====
Round	1	2	3	4	5	6	7	8	9	10	11	12	13	14	15	16	17	18	19	20	21
Ground	H	A	H	A	H	A	H	A	H	A	H	A	H	A	H	A	H	A	H	A	H
Result	W	W	W	L	W	L	L	W	D	W	W	W	D	L	W	W	L				
Position	3	2	3	4	2	3	6	5	6	4	3	3	4	4	4	4	4				

Updated to match(es) played on 7 January 2025. Source: Liga I
A = Away; H = Home; W = Win; D = Draw; L = Loss

==== Matches ====
25 August 2024 1	Omonia Nicosia	3-0	Ethnikos Achnas	Nicosia
20:00 EET	Charalampous 32'; Masouras (yellow card) 66'; Alioum 77' 86'	Report	Ofori (yellow card) 17'; Pablo González (yellow card) 54'	Stadium: GSP Stadium; Attendance: 9,645; Referee: (Cyprus) Panagiotis Hadjigeorghiou

1 September 2024 2	Nea Salamis	2-3	Omonia Nicosia	Larnaca
20:30 EET	Papageorgiou 21'; Vellios 35'; Bejarano (yellow card) 39'; Carlitos (yellow card) 45+3'; Sergiou (yellow card) 87'; Diakité (yellow card) 90+7'	Report	Willy Semedo 16'; Diounkou (yellow card) 34'; Stępiński 83' 87'; Atzili (yellow card) 90+1'	Stadium: Ammochostos Stadium; Attendance: 3,000; Referee: (Cyprus) Kyriakos Athanasiou

16 September 2024 3	Omonia Nicosia	1-0	AEK Larnaca	Nicosia
19:00 EET	Ewandro 23'; Kousoulos (yellow card) 69'; Diounkou (yellow card) 71'; Eraković (yellow card) 78'; Kakoullis (yellow card) 88'	Report	Aitor Cantalapiedra (yellow card) 43'; Athanasiadis (yellow card) 45+3'	Stadium: GSP Stadium; Attendance: 11,400; Referee: (Cyprus) Marios Christoforou

21 September 2024 4	Anorthosis	1-0	Omonia Nicosia	Larnaca
19:00 EET	Mugabi (yellow card) 29'; Artymatas (yellow card) 40'; Rafael Lopes 45+9'; Charalampous (yellow card) 90+1'	Report	Stępiński (red card) 33'; Charalampous (yellow card) 50'	Stadium: Antonis Papadopoulos Stadium; Attendance: 4,000; Referee: (Cyprus) Menelaos Antoniou

27 September 2024 5	Omonia Nicosia	3-1	AEL	Nicosia
19:00 EET	Ewandro (yellow card) 11'; Kakoullis 44'; Coulibaly 51' 65'; Kousoulos (yellow card) 87'	Report	Singh 8'; Christoforos Frantzis (yellow card) 24'; Ouédraogo (yellow card) 64'; Mellado (yellow card) 64'; Kecskés (red card) 80'	Stadium: GSP Stadium; Attendance: 9,700; Referee: (Cyprus) Kyriakos Athanasiou

6 October 2024 6	Aris Limassol	2-0	Omonia Nicosia	Kolossi
19:00 EET	Kvilitaia 25' 54' (pen.); Yago (yellow card) 45+2' (yellow-red card) 88'; Struski (yellow card) 57'	Report	Khammas (yellow card) 9'; Coulibaly (yellow card) 51'; Panagiotou (yellow card) 53'; Loizou (yellow card) 90+1'	Stadium: Alphamega Stadium; Attendance: 1,000; Referee: (Cyprus) Marios Christoforou

19 October 2024 7	Omonia Nicosia	0-1	Enosis	Nicosia
18:00 EET	Loizou (yellow card) 90+7'	Report	Barry 29'; Sambou (yellow card) 57'; Ilija Milićević (yellow card) 61'; Dimitris Solomou (yellow card) 70'; Andreas Christofi (yellow card) 74'; Sean Ioannou (yellow card) 79'; Krainz (yellow card) 86'	Stadium: GSP Stadium; Attendance: 7,700; Referee: (Cyprus) Chrysovalantis Theouli

28 October 2024 8	Karmiotissa	2-6	Omonia Nicosia	Larnaca
19:00 EET	Doumbia (yellow card) 14'; Tsoukalas (yellow card) 30'; Hočko (yellow card) 33'; Antoniou 41'; Cmiljanić 64'; Mattheou (yellow card) 90+6'	Report	Ewandro 19'; kakoullis 30'; Coulibaly (yellow card) 41'; Masouras (yellow card) 52'; Willy Semedo 56'; Marić (yellow card) 58'; Kousoulos (yellow card) 77' (goal) 80'; Alioum 90+1' 90+6'	Stadium: Ammochostos Stadium; Attendance: 3,000; Referee: (Cyprus) Ioannis Christodoulou

2 November 2024 9	Omonia Nicosia	1-1	PAC Omonia 29M	Nicosia
19:00 EET	Loizou (red card) 45+6'; Eraković 72' (pen.); Marić (yellow card) 84'; Kitsos (yellow card) 90+4'	Report	Sotiris Fiakas (yellow card) 27'; Fernandes (yellow card) 45+5' (goal) 74'; Carp (yellow card) 45+8'; Andreou (yellow card) 53'; Šabanadžović (yellow card) 60'	Stadium: GSP Stadium; Attendance: 7,500; Referee: (Cyprus) Konstantinos Fellas

10 November 2024 10	Omonia Aradippou	3-5	Omonia Nicosia	Larnaca
17:00 EET	Antreas Shikkis (yellow card) 37'; Ferrier 44'; Giorgos Pontikos 83'; Mika Borges 90' (pen.)	Report	Alioum 11'; Stępiński 18' 23' 75'; Musiałowski 34' (yellow card) 45+2'; Diounkou (yellow card) 89'	Stadium: Antonis Papadopoulos Stadium; Attendance: 700; Referee: (Cyprus) Constantinos Photiou

23 November 2024 11	Omonia Nicosia	3-1	Apollon	Nicosia
19:00 EET	Simić (yellow card) 31'; Jovetić 49' (pen.); Stępiński 61'; Kousoulos (yellow card) 88'; Kakoullis 90+7'	Report	Bruno Santos (yellow card) 31'; Dorregaray 89' (yellow card) 90'	Stadium: GSP Stadium; Attendance: 8,800; Referee: (Italy) Juan Luca Sacchi

2 December 2024 12	Pafos	0-1	Omonia Nicosia	Paphos
19:00 EET	Jairo (yellow card) 65'; Dragomir (yellow card) 70'; João Correia (yellow card) 81'; Luckassen (yellow card) 90'; Tanković (yellow card) 90+2'; David Goldar (yellow card) 90+4'	Report	Willy Semedo (yellow card) 71'; Jovetić 90+2'	Stadium: Stelios Kyriakides Stadium; Attendance: 6,700; Referee: (Switzerland) Lionel Tschudi

7 December 2024 13	Omonia Nicosia	2-2	APOEL	Nicosia
17:00 EET	Loizou 11'; Jovetić 16'; Coulibaly (yellow card) 84'	Report	Dražić 33' 61'; Sergio Tejera (yellow card) 39'; Petrović (yellow card) 45+4'; Sušić (yellow card) 75'; Laifis (yellow card) 82'; Xavi Quintillà (yellow card) 84'; Panayiotis Kattirtzis (yellow card) 90+2'	Stadium: GSP Stadium; Attendance: 12,000; Referee: (Switzerland) Luca Cibelli

15 December 2024 14	Ethnikos Achna	1-0	Omonia Nicosia	Achna
19:00 EET	Petros Ioannou (yellow card) 34'; Pablo González 67'; Bahanack (yellow card) 69'; Ofori (yellow card) 73'; Julián Bonetto (yellow card) 85'	Report	Loizou (yellow card) 72'; Panagiotou (yellow card) 73'; Simić (yellow card) 90+9'	Stadium: Dasaki Stadium; Attendance: 2,000; Referee: (Cyprus) Ioannis Christodoulou

22 December 2024 15	Omonia Nicosia	3-0	Nea Salamis	Nicosia
19:00 EET	Lang 32'; Simić 49'; Marić (yellow card) 51'; Jovetić 84'	Report	Tomović (yellow card) 78'	Stadium: GSP Stadium; Attendance: 6,400; Referee: (Cyprus) Menelaos Antoniou

3 January 2025 16	AEK Larnaca	0-3	Omonia Nicosia	Larnaca
19:45 EET	Henriques (yellow card) 30'	Report	Kakoullis 30' 89' (yellow card) 90'; Jovetić (yellow card) 37'; Fabiano Freitas (yellow card) 52'; Diounkou (yellow card) 55'; Charalampous (yellow card) 80'; Alioum 90+5'	Stadium: AEK Arena – Georgios Karapatakis; Attendance: 4,240; Referee: (Italy) Alessandro Prontera

7 January 2025 17	Omonia Nicosia	0-2	Anorthosis	Nicosia
19:30 EET	Alioum (yellow card) 69'; Charalampous (yellow card) 76'; Khammas (yellow card) 87'	Report	Evagoras Charalambous 41'; Roguljić 46'; André Teixeira (yellow card) 61'; Rafael Lopes (yellow card) 67'; Charalampous (yellow card) 89'	Stadium: GSP Stadium; Referee: (Cyprus) Panagiotis Hadjigeorghiou

12 January 2025 18	AEL	-	Omonia Nicosia	Kolossi
19:00 EET				Stadium: Alphamega Stadium

=== Cypriot Cup ===
15 January 2025 Second Round	Omonia Nicosia	-	Spartakos Kitiou	Nicosia
19:00 EET				Stadium: GSP Stadium

=== UEFA Conference League ===
==== Second qualifying round ====
The draw was held on 19 June 2024.

25 July 2024 First leg	Omonia (Cyprus)	3–1	(Georgia (country)) Torpedo Kutaisi	Strovolos
19:30 UTC+3	Coulibaly (yellow card) 31', (goal) 41', 77'; Gigauri (yellow card) 43'; Charalampous (yellow card) 52'; Khammas (yellow card) 56'; Fabiano Freitas (yellow card) 75'; Ewandro 84'	Report	Mtchedlishvili (yellow card) 13'; Ninković (yellow card) 33'; Yansané 74', (yellow card) 77'; Johnsen (yellow card) 87'; Sandokhadze (yellow card) 90+3'	Stadium: GSP Stadium; Referee: Martin Matoša (Slovenia)

1 August 2024 Second leg	Torpedo Kutaisi (Georgia (country))	1–2 (2–5 agg.)	(Cyprus) Omonia	Kutaisi, Georgia
21:00 UTC+4	Yansané 47'	Report	Stępiński 25'; Semedo 81' (pen.)	Stadium: Ramaz Shengelia Stadium; Referee: Ishmael Barbara (Malta)

==== Third qualifying round ====
8 August 2024 First leg	Omonia (Cyprus)	1–0	(Hungary) Fehérvár FC	Strovolos
20:00 EET	Eraković (yellow card) 53'; Stępiński 60'	Report	Melnyk (yellow card) 28'; András Huszti (yellow card) 63'; Katona (yellow card) 65'	Stadium: GSP Stadium; Attendance: 15,071; Referee: (Switzerland) Lionel Tschudi

14 August 2024 Second leg	Fehérvár FC (Hungary)	0–2 (0–3 agg.)	(Cyprus) Omonia	Székesfehérvár
18:00 CET	Serafimov (yellow card) 72'	Report	Willy Semedo 28' (yellow card) 28'; Kakoullis 90+5'	Stadium: Sóstói Stadion; Attendance: 3,840; Referee: (Denmark) Jakob Kehlet

==== Play-off round ====
22 August 2024 First leg	Omonia (Cyprus)	6–0	(Azerbaijan) Zira	Strovolos
20:00 EET	Khammas 13'; Willy Semedo 34' (pen.) 70'; Stępiński 45+1' 54'; Ewandro 60'	Report	Kuliyev (yellow card) 27'; Tiago Silva (yellow card) 31'; Ruan Renato (yellow card) 33'; Zebli (yellow card) 69'	Stadium: GSP Stadium; Attendance: 16,551; Referee: (Estonia) Juri Frischer

29 August 2024 Second leg	Zira (Azerbaijan)	1–0 (1–6 agg.)	(Cyprus) Omonia Nicosia	Baku
20:00 AZT	Alıyev (yellow card) 65'; Raphael Utzig 79'	Report	Ewandro (yellow card) 38'	Stadium: Dalga Arena; Attendance: 1,700; Referee: (Latvia) Vitālijs Spasjoņņikovs

==== League phase ====
3 October 2024 1	(Cyprus) Omonia Nicosia	4-0	(Iceland) Víkingur Reykjavik	Nicosia
19:45 EET	Simić (yellow card) 47'; Coulibaly 51'; Kakoullis 81' 90'; Alioum 86'	Report	Davíð Örn Atlason (yellow card) 42'	Stadium: GSP Stadium; Attendance: 11,153; Referee: (Netherlands) Sander van der Eijk

24 October 2024 2	(Scotland) Heart of Midlothian	2-0	(Cyprus) Omonia Nicosia	Edinburgh
17:45	Shankland (yellow card) 3'; Forrest 16'; Spittal 23'; Adam Forrester (yellow card) 48'; Gordon (yellow card) 57'	Report	Marić (yellow card) 6'; Coulibaly (yellow card) 62'	Stadium: Tynecastle Park; Attendance: 17,178; Referee: (Slovakia) Michal Očenáš

7 November 2024 3	(Belgium) Gent	1-0	(Cyprus) Omonia Nicosia	Ghent
18:45 CET	Gandelman 31'; Dean (yellow card) 90+4'	Report	kakoullis (yellow card) 84'	Stadium: Planet Group Arena; Attendance: 8,584; Referee: (Hungary) Tamás Bognár

28 November 2024 4	(Cyprus) Omonia Nicosia	0-3	(Poland) Legia Warsaw	Nicosia
22:00 EET	Marić (yellow card) 27'; Ewandro (yellow card) 90+2'	Report	Morishita 17' (yellow card) 25'; Szczepaniak 77'; Wszołek 85'; Kapustka (yellow card) 89'	Stadium: GSP Stadium; Attendance: 8.009; Referee: (Bulgaria) Radoslav Gidzhenov

12 December 2024 5	(Cyprus) Omonia Nicosia	3-1	(Austria) Rapid Wien	Nicosia
22:00 EET	Marić (yellow card) 51'; Kakoullis 52'; Willy Semedo 66'; Alioum 90+6'	Report	Cvetković (yellow card) 31'; Beljo 62'; Sangaré (yellow card) 74'	Stadium: GSP Stadium; Attendance: 7,801; Referee: (Poland) Daniel Stefański

19 December 2024 6	(Bosnia and Herzegovina) Borac Banja Luka	0-0	(Cyprus) Omonia Nicosia	Banja Luka
21:00 CET		Report	Willy Semedo (yellow card) 59'; Ewandro (yellow card) 70'	Stadium: Banja Luka City Stadium; Attendance: 5,034; Referee: (Sweden) Mohammed Al-Hakim

=== Table ===
The top eight ranked teams received a bye to the round of 16. The teams ranked from 9th to 24th will contest the knockout phase play-offs, with the teams ranked from 9th to 16th seeded for the draw. Teams ranked from 25th to 36th were eliminated from the competition.

Pos	Team	Pld	W	D	L	GF	GA	GD	Pts	Qualification
20	(Football Association of Bosnia and Herzegovina) Borac Banja Luka	6	2	2	2	4	7	−3	8	Advance to knockout phase play-offs (unseeded)
21	(Football Association of Slovenia) Celje	6	2	1	3	13	13	0	7	Advance to knockout phase play-offs (unseeded)
22	(Cyprus Football Association) Omonia	6	2	1	3	7	7	0	7	Advance to knockout phase play-offs (unseeded)
23	(Norwegian Football Federation) Molde	6	2	1	3	10	11	−1	7	Advance to knockout phase play-offs (unseeded)
24	(Football Association of Serbia) TSC	6	2	1	3	10	13	−3	7	Advance to knockout phase play-offs (unseeded)

Source: UEFA
Rules for classification: League phase tiebreakers
