= Cyprus national football team results (1960–1969) =

- Win Draw Loss

The Cyprus national football team represents Cyprus in association football and is controlled by the Cyprus Football Association (CFA), the governing body of the sport in the country.

The first match Cyprus played between 1960 and 1969 was a 1–1 defeat against Israel. Their last match between 1960 and 1969 was a 12–0 defeat against West Germany. This match also stands as the heaviest defeat in Cyprus's football history.

== Results ==
=== 1960 ===
13 November 1960 1962 FIFA World Cup Qualification; Group 7	Cyprus	1-1	Israel	Nicosia, Cyprus
14:30 (UTC+2:00)	Shialis 29'	Report	Kofman 31'	Stadium: GSP Stadium; Attendance: 11,000; Referee: Živko Bajić (Yugoslavia)
Note: This was the first official match for Cyprus. Michalis Shialis scored the first goal for Cyprus and set the goal scoring record. (1 goal)

27 November 1960 1962 FIFA World Cup Qualification; Group 7	Israel	6-1	Cyprus	Ramat Gan, Israel
14:30 (UTC+2:00)	Levi 14', 30', 34', 66'; Stelmach 61', 88'	Report	Shialis 89' (pen.)	Stadium: National Stadium; Attendance: 45,000; Referee: Živko Bajić (Yugoslavia)
Note: Michalis Shialis set the goal scoring record for Cyprus. (2 goals)

=== 1963 ===
27 November 1963 Friendly	Cyprus	3-1	Greece	Nicosia, Cyprus
15:00 (UTC+2:00)	Hristodoulou 22'; Krystallis 51', 68'	Report	Domazos 72' (pen.)	Stadium: GSP Stadium; Attendance: 11,000; Referee: Yiannos Angelis (Cyprus)

=== 1965 ===
20 March 1965 Friendly	Cyprus	2-0	Lebanon	Nicosia, Cyprus
15:45 (UTC+2:00)	Krystallis 20', 44'	Report		Stadium: GSP Stadium; Referee: Mihalis Kiriakidis (Cyprus)
Note: Panikos Krystallis set the goal scoring record for Cyprus. (4 goals)

24 April 1965 1966 FIFA World Cup Qualification; Group 2	West Germany	5-0	Cyprus	Karlsruhe, West Germany
16:00 (UTC+1:00)	Sieloff 16' (pen.), 69'; Overath 22', 85'; Strehl 69'	Report		Stadium: Wildparkstadion; Attendance: 39,675; Referee: Norman Mootz (Luxembourg)

5 May 1965 1966 FIFA World Cup Qualification; Group 2	Sweden	3-0	Cyprus	Norrköping, Sweden
18:00 (UTC+1:00)	Simonsson 24', 71'; Jonsson 53'	Report		Stadium: Norrköpings Idrottspark; Attendance: 15,976; Referee: Magnús Pétursson (Iceland)

7 November 1965 1966 FIFA World Cup Qualification; Group 2	Cyprus	0-5	Sweden	Famagusta, Cyprus
14:30 (UTC+2:00)		Report	Granström 24', 25'; Kindvall 35'; Larsson 42', 85'	Stadium: GSE Stadium; Attendance: 2,716; Referee: István Zsolt (Hungary)

14 November 1965 1966 FIFA World Cup Qualification; Group 2	Cyprus	0-6	West Germany	Nicosia, Cyprus
14:30 (UTC+2:00)		Report	Heiß 30'; Krämer 32'; Szymaniak 57'; Brunnenmeier 82', 88'; Panayiotou 87' (o.g.)	Stadium: GSP Stadium; Attendance: 3,412; Referee: Francesco Francescon (Italy)

=== 1966 ===
3 December 1966 UEFA Euro 1968 qualifying Group 6	Cyprus	1-5	Romania	Nicosia, Cyprus
14:30 (UTC+2:00)	Pieridis 32'	Report	Dridea 49', 51', 82'; Frăţilă 65', 74'	Stadium: GSP Stadium; Attendance: 4,823; Referee: Arthur Lentini (Malta)

=== 1967 ===
22 March 1967 UEFA Euro 1968 qualifying Group 6	Cyprus	0-2	Italy	Nicosia, Cyprus
15:45 (UTC+2:00)		Report	Domenghini 76'; Facchetti 88'	Stadium: GSP Stadium; Attendance: 11,105; Referee: Atanas Stavrev (Bulgaria)

23 April 1967 UEFA Euro 1968 qualifying Group 6	Romania	7-0	Cyprus	Bucharest, Romania
16:00 (UTC+2:00)	Lucescu 4'; Martinovici 15'; Dumitriu 24', 27', 52', 77', 84'	Report		Stadium: Stadionul 23 August; Attendance: 9,412; Referee: Milivoje Gugulović (Yugoslavia)

1 November 1967 UEFA Euro 1968 qualifying Group 6	Italy	5-0	Cyprus	Cosenza, Italy
14:30 (UTC+1:00)	Mazzola 12', 22'; Riva 46', 55', 59'	Report		Stadium: Stadio San Vito; Attendance: 22,059; Referee: Antoine Queudeville (Luxembourg)

8 November 1967 UEFA Euro 1968 qualifying Group 6	Switzerland	5-0	Cyprus	Lugano, Switzerland
20:30 (UTC+1:00)	Blättler 30', 55'; Künzli 41'; Dürr 56' (pen.); Odermatt 72'	Report		Stadium: Stadio Comunale di Cornaredo; Attendance: 3,737; Referee: Robert Schaut (Belgium)

=== 1968 ===
17 February 1968 UEFA Euro 1968 qualifying Group 6	Cyprus	2-1	Switzerland	Nicosia, Cyprus
15:30 (UTC+2:00)	Asprou 22'; Papdopoulos 46'	Report	Panayiotou 9' (o.g.)	Stadium: GSP Stadium; Attendance: 8,000; Referee: Pavel Špoták (Czechoslovakia)

19 May 1968 1970 FIFA World Cup qualification Group 7	Austria	7-1	Cyprus	Vienna, Austria
15:00 (UTC+1:00)	Hof 4', 42', 53', 68', 73'; Redl 25'; Siber 73'	Report	Kantzilieris 47'	Stadium: Praterstadion; Attendance: 27,171; Referee: János Biróczky (Hungary)

23 November 1968 1970 FIFA World Cup qualification Group 7	Cyprus	0-1	West Germany	Nicosia, Cyprus
14:30 (UTC+2:00)		Report	Müller 90'	Stadium: GSP Stadium; Attendance: 6,080; Referee: Alexandru Pîrvu (Romania)

11 December 1968 1970 FIFA World Cup qualification Group 7	Cyprus	0-5	Scotland	Nicosia, Cyprus
14:30 (UTC+2:00)		Report	Gilzean 2', 33', 41', 43'; Murdoch 23'	Stadium: GSP Stadium; Attendance: 5,895; Referee: Paul Bonett (Malta)

=== 1969 ===
19 April 1969 1970 FIFA World Cup qualification Group 7	Cyprus	1-2	Austria	Nicosia, Cyprus
16:00 (UTC+2:00)	Euthimiadis 90'	Report	Kruez 27'; Redl 55'	Stadium: GSP Stadium; Attendance: 5,247; Referee: Gocho Rusev (Bulgaria)

17 May 1969 1970 FIFA World Cup qualification Group 7	Scotland	8-0	Cyprus	Glasgow, Scotland
15:00 (UTC+1:00)	Gray 16'; McNeill 25'; Stein 28', 49', 61', 67'; Henderson 72'; Gemmell 75'	Report		Stadium: Hampden Park; Attendance: 39,095; Referee: Peter Coates (Republic of Ireland)

19 May 1969 1970 FIFA World Cup qualification Group 7	West Germany	12-0	Cyprus	Essen, West Germany
19:00 (UTC+1:00)	Müller 3', 43', 49', 85'; Overath 5', 12', 63'; Haller 14', 47'; Lorenz 38'; Held 41'; Höttges 51'	Report		Stadium: Georg-Melches-Stadion; Attendance: 36,036; Referee: Jacques Colling (Luxembourg)
Note: This was the heaviest defeat for Cyprus.

== Record by opponent ==
Team	Pld	W	D	L	GF	GA	GD	WPCT
Austria	2	0	0	2	2	9	−7	0.00
Greece	1	1	0	0	3	1	+2	100.00
Israel	2	0	1	1	2	7	−5	0.00
Italy	2	0	0	2	0	7	−7	0.00
Lebanon	1	1	0	0	2	0	+2	100.00
Romania	2	0	0	2	1	12	−11	0.00
Scotland	2	0	0	2	0	13	−13	0.00
Sweden	2	0	0	2	0	8	−8	0.00
Switzerland	2	1	0	1	2	6	−4	50.00
West Germany	4	0	0	4	0	24	−24	0.00
Total	20	3	1	16	12	87	−75	15.00

Source: Results
