= Cyprus national football team results =

Cyprus national football team results may refer to:

- Cyprus national football team results (unofficial matches), for the list of unofficial matches
- Cyprus national football team results (1960–1969) for the list of results between 1960 and 1969
- Cyprus national football team results (1970–1989) for the list of results between 1970 and 1989
- Cyprus national football team results (1990–2009) for the list of results between 1990 and 2009
- Cyprus national football team results (2010–2019), for the list of results between 2010 and 2019
- Cyprus national football team results (2020–present), for the list of results from 2020 onwards
