= 1970 FIFA World Cup qualification – UEFA Group 7 =

Sporting event

The 1970 FIFA World Cup qualification UEFA Group 7 was a UEFA qualifying group for the 1970 FIFA World Cup. The group comprised Austria, Cyprus, Scotland and West Germany.

== Standings ==
Rank	Team	Pld	W	D	L	GF	GA	GD	Pts
1	West Germany	6	5	1	0	20	3	+17	11
2	Scotland	6	3	1	2	18	7	+11	7
3	Austria	6	3	0	3	12	7	+5	6
4	Cyprus	6	0	0	6	2	35	−33	0

== Matches ==
19 May 1968

Austria	7–1	Cyprus
Hof 4' (pen.), 42', 53', 68', 76' (pen.); Redl 25'; Siber 73'	Report	Kantzilieris 47'

Prater Stadion, Vienna
Referee: Biróczky (Hungary)

13 October 1968

Austria	0–2	West Germany
	Report	Müller 16'; Eigenstiller 51' (o.g.)

Prater Stadion, Vienna
Referee: Eksztajn (Poland)

6 November 1968

Scotland	2–1	Austria
Law 8'; Bremner 75'	Report	Starek 3'

Hampden Park, Glasgow
Referee: Curt Liedberg (Sweden)

23 November 1968

Cyprus	0–1	West Germany
	Report	Müller 90'

GSP Stadium, Nicosia
Referee: Pirvu (Romania)

11 December 1968

Cyprus	0–5	Scotland
	Report	Gilzean 5', 35'; Murdoch 25', 43'; Stein 44'

GSP Stadium, Nicosia
Referee: Bonett (Malta)

16 April 1969

Scotland	1–1	West Germany
Murdoch 85'	Report	Müller 39'

Hampden Park, Glasgow
Referee: Gardeazábal (Spain)

19 April 1969

Cyprus	1–2	Austria
Efthimiadis 89'	Report	Kreuz 27'; Redl 55'

GSP Stadium, Nicosia
Referee: Rusev (Bulgaria)

10 May 1969

West Germany	1–0	Austria
Müller 88'	Report

Städtisches Stadion, Nuremberg
Referee: Fiala (Czechoslovakia)

17 May 1969

Scotland	8–0	Cyprus
Gray 15'; McNeill 25'; Stein 28', 49', 59', 67'; Henderson 70'; Gemmell 76' (pen.)	Report

Hampden Park, Glasgow
Referee: Coates (Republic of Ireland)

21 May 1969

West Germany	12–0	Cyprus
Müller 3', 44', 48', 85'; Overath 5', 12', 63'; Haller 17', 46'; Lorenz 40'; Held 41'; Höttges 51'	Report

Georg-Melches-Stadion, Essen
Referee: Coiling (Luxembourg)

22 October 1969

West Germany	3–2	Scotland
Fichtel 37'; Müller 59'; Libuda 79'	Report	Johnstone 3'; Gilzean 62'

Volksparkstadion, Hamburg
Referee: Droz (Switzerland)

5 November 1969

Austria	2–0	Scotland
Redl 15', 52'	Report

Prater Stadion, Vienna
Referee: Kruaszwili (Soviet Union)
