= Cyprus national football team results (2010–2019) =

- Win Draw Loss

This article provides details of international football games played by the Cyprus national football team from 2010 to 2019.

The first match Cyprus played in the 2010s was a 0–0 draw against Iceland in a friendly match. The team completed five qualification campaigns between 2000 and 2009, two for the FIFA World Cup and three for the UEFA European Championship; they failed to qualify in each. They also participated in the inaugural UEFA Nations League, they were placed League C and finished in third place of Group 3. Between 2010 and 2019, the team played 77 matches and their record was 15 wins, 14 draws and 48 losses.

== Matches ==
=== 2010 ===
3 March 2010 Friendly	Cyprus	0–0	Iceland	Larnaca, Cyprus
18:00 UTC+2		Report		Stadium: Antonis Papadopoulos Stadium; Attendance: 500; Referee: Nikolay Yordanov (Bulgaria)

11 August 2010 Friendly	Cyprus	1–0	Andorra	Larnaca, Cyprus
20:00 UTC+3	Konstantinou 4'	Report		Stadium: Antonis Papadopoulos Stadium; Attendance: 1,700; Referee: Ilias Spathas (Greece)

3 September 2010 Euro 2012 qualifying	Portugal	4–4	Cyprus	Guimarães, Portugal
20:45 UTC+1	Almeida 8'; Meireles 29'; Danny 50'; Fernandes 60'	Report	Aloneftis 3'; Konstantinou 11'; Okkas 57'; Avraam 89'	Stadium: Estádio D. Afonso Henriques; Attendance: 9,100; Referee: Mark Clattenburg (England)

8 October 2010 Euro 2012 qualifying	Cyprus	1–2	Norway	Larnaca, Cyprus
21:00 UTC+3	Okkas 58'	Report	J. Riise 2'; Carew 42'	Stadium: Antonis Papadopoulos Stadium; Attendance: 7,648; Referee: Serge Gumienny (Belgium)

12 October 2010 Euro 2012 qualifying	Denmark	2–0	Cyprus	Copenhagen, Denmark
20:15 UTC+2	Rasmussen 47'; Lorentzen 81'	Report		Stadium: Parken Stadium; Attendance: 15,544; Referee: César Muñiz Fernández (Spain)

16 November 2010 Friendly	Jordan	0–0	Cyprus	Amman, Jordan
17:00 UTC+2		Report		Stadium: King Abdullah II Stadium; Attendance: 3,500; Referee: Zakareya Ali (Bahrain)

=== 2011 ===
8 February 2011 2011 Cyprus International Tournament Semifinal	Cyprus	0–2	Sweden	Nicosia, Cyprus
19:00 UTC+2		Report	Hysén 26'; Berg 45+1'	Stadium: GSP Stadium; Attendance: 2,000; Referee: Alexandru Tudor (Romania)

9 February 2011 2011 Cyprus International Tournament 3rd	Cyprus	1–1 (a.e.t.) (4–5 p)	Romania	Paralimni, Cyprus
20:30 UTC+2	Konstantinou 85'	Report	Torje 54'	Stadium: Paralimni Stadium; Attendance: 2,000; Referee: Viktor Shvetsov (Ukraine)

26 March 2011 Euro 2012 qualifying	Cyprus	0–0	Iceland	Nicosia, Cyprus
20:00 UTC+2		Report		Stadium: GSP Stadium; Attendance: 2,088; Referee: Darko Čeferin (Slovenia)

29 March 2011 Friendly	Cyprus	0–1	Bulgaria	Larnaca, Cyprus
20:00 UTC+3		Report	Torje 35'	Stadium: Antonis Papadopoulos Stadium; Attendance: 120; Referee: Marco Borg (Malta)

10 August 2011 Friendly	Cyprus	3–2	Moldova	Nicosia, Cyprus
20:00 UTC+3	Avraam 13', 52'; Dobrašinović 89'	Report	Armaş 23'; Ovseanicov 45+1'	Stadium: GSP Stadium; Attendance: 2,000; Referee: Milorad Mažić (Serbia)

2 September 2011 Euro 2012 qualifying	Cyprus	0–4	Portugal	Nicosia, Cyprus
21:45 UTC+3		Report	Ronaldo 35' (pen.), 83'; Almeida 84'; Danny 90+2'	Stadium: GSP Stadium; Attendance: 15,444; Referee: Gianluca Rocchi (Italy)

6 September 2011 Euro 2012 qualifying	Iceland	1–0	Cyprus	Reykjavík, Iceland
18:45 UTC±0	Sigþórsson 5'	Report		Stadium: Laugardalsvöllur; Attendance: 5,267; Referee: Boško Jovanetić (Serbia)

7 October 2011 Euro 2012 qualifying	Cyprus	1–4	Denmark	Nicosia, Cyprus
21:30 UTC+3	Avraam 45+1'	Report	Jacobsen 7'; Rommedahl 11', 22'; Krohn-Dehli 20'	Stadium: GSP Stadium; Attendance: 2,408; Referee: Marijo Strahonja (Croatia)

11 October 2011 Euro 2012 qualifying	Norway	3–1	Cyprus	Oslo, Norway
20:15 UTC+2	Pedersen 25'; Carew 34'; Høgli 65'	Report	Okkas 42'	Stadium: Ullevaal Stadion; Attendance: 13,490; Referee: Willie Collum (Scotland)

11 November 2011 Friendly	Cyprus	1–2	Scotland	Larnaca, Cyprus
20:00 UTC+2	Christofi 59'	Report	Miller 24'; Mackie 56'	Stadium: Antonis Papadopoulos Stadium; Attendance: 1,360; Referee: Meir Levi (Israel)

=== 2012 ===
29 February 2012 Friendly	Cyprus	0–0	Serbia	Larnaca, Cyprus
16:00 UTC+3		Report		Stadium: GSZ Stadium; Attendance: 250; Referee: Kevin Blom (Netherlands)

15 August 2012 Friendly	Bulgaria	1–0	Cyprus	Sofia, Bulgaria
21:00 UTC+3	Mitsanski 56'	Report		Stadium: Stadion Georgi Asparuhov; Attendance: 450; Referee: Christopher Lautier (Malta)

7 September 2012 2014 World Cup qualification	Albania	3–1	Cyprus	Tirana, Albania
20:30 UTC+2	Laban 45+5'	Report	Sadiku 36'; Çani 84'; Bogdani 87'	Stadium: Qemal Stafa Stadium; Attendance: 9,400; Referee: Artyom Kuchin (Kazakhstan)

11 September 2012 2014 World Cup qualification	Cyprus	1–0	Iceland	Larnaca, Cyprus
20:00 UTC+3	Makrides 57'	Report		Stadium: Antonis Papadopoulos Stadium; Attendance: 1,600; Referee: Sébastien Delferière (Belgium)

12 October 2012 2014 World Cup qualification	Slovenia	2–1	Cyprus	Maribor, Slovenia
20:45 UTC+2	Matavž 38', 61'	Report	Aloneftis 83'	Stadium: Ljudski vrt Attendance: 7,988; Referee: Ivan Kružliak (Slovakia)

16 October 2012 2014 World Cup qualification	Cyprus	1–3	Norway	Larnaca, Cyprus
21:00 UTC+3	Aloneftis 42'	Report	Hangeland 44'; Elyounoussi 81' (pen.); King 83'	Stadium: Antonis Papadopoulos Stadium; Attendance: 2,493; Referee: Paweł Gil (Poland)

14 November 2012 Friendly	Cyprus	0–3	Finland	Nicosia, Cyprus
19:00 UTC+2		Report	Pukki 15'; Hetemaj 29' (pen.); Kolehmainen 85'	Stadium: GSP Stadium; Attendance: 300; Referee: Cristian Balaj (Romania)

=== 2013 ===
6 February 2013 Friendly	Cyprus	1–3	Serbia	Nicosia, Cyprus
18:00 UTC+2	Makrides 19'	Report	Tadić 33', 47'; Basta 70'	Stadium: GSP Stadium; Attendance: 200; Referee: Thanasis Giahos (Greece)

23 March 2013 2014 World Cup qualification	Cyprus	0–0	Switzerland	Nicosia, Cyprus
18:30 UTC+2		Report		Stadium: GSP Stadium; Attendance: 3,572; Referee: Manuel Gräfe (Germany)

8 June 2013 2014 World Cup qualification	Switzerland	1–0	Cyprus	Geneva, Switzerland
17:30 UTC+2	Seferovic 90'	Report		Stadium: Stade de Genève; Attendance: 16,900; Referee: Paolo Mazzoleni (Italy)

6 September 2013 2014 World Cup qualification	Norway	2–0	Cyprus	Oslo, Norway
19:00 UTC+2	Elyounoussi 43'; King 66'	Report		Stadium: Ullevaal Stadion; Attendance: 11,295; Referee: Kenn Hansen (Denmark)

10 September 2013 2014 World Cup qualification	Cyprus	0–2	Slovenia	Nicosia, Cyprus
21:30 UTC+3		Report	Novaković 12'; Iličić 80'	Stadium: GSP Stadium; Attendance: 714; Referee: Ruddy Buquet (France)

11 October 2013 2014 World Cup qualification	Iceland	2–0	Cyprus	Reykjavík, Iceland
18:45 UTC±0	Sigþórsson 60'; Sigurðsson 76'	Report		Stadium: Laugardalsvöllur; Attendance: 9,767; Referee: István Vad (Hungary)

15 October 2013 2014 World Cup qualification	Cyprus	0–0	Albania	Nicosia, Cyprus
19:00 UTC+3		Report		Stadium: GSP Stadium; Attendance: 341; Referee: Ivan Bebek (Croatia)

=== 2014 ===
5 March 2014 Friendly	Cyprus	0–0	Northern Ireland	Nicosia, Cyprus
20:00 UTC+2		Report		Stadium: GSP Stadium; Attendance: 3,000; Referee: Liran Liany (Israel)

27 May 2014 Kirin Cup	Japan	1–0	Cyprus	Saitama, Japan
19:30 UTC+9	Uchida 43'	Report		Stadium: Saitama Stadium 2002; Attendance: 58,564; Referee: Paweł Raczkowski (Poland)

4 September 2014 Friendly	Croatia	2–0	Cyprus	Pula, Croatia
20:15 UTC+2	Mandžukić 18', 58'	Report		Stadium: Stadion Aldo Drosina; Attendance: 6,000; Referee: Marco Guida (Italy)

9 September 2014 Euro 2016 qualifying	Bosnia and Herzegovina	1–2	Cyprus	Zenica, Bosnia and Herzegovina
20:45 UTC+2	Ibišević 6'	Report	Christofi 45', 73'	Stadium: Bilino Polje Stadium; Attendance: 12,100; Referee: Yevhen Aranovskyi (Ukraine)

10 October2014 Euro 2016 qualifying	Cyprus	1–2	Israel	Nicosia, Cyprus
21:45 UTC+3	Makrides 67'	Report	Damari 38'; Ben Haim II 45'	Stadium: GSP Stadium; Attendance: 19,164; Referee: Daniele Orsato (Italy)

13 October 2014 Euro 2016 qualifying	Wales	2–1	Cyprus	Cardiff, Wales
19:00 UTC+2	Cotterill 13'; Robson-Kanu 23'	Report	Laban 36'	Stadium: Cardiff City Stadium; Attendance: 21,273; Referee: Manuel Gräfe (Germany)

16 November 2014 Euro 2016 qualifying	Cyprus	5–0	Andorra	Nicosia, Cyprus
19:00 UTC+2	Merkis 9'; Efrem 31', 42', 60'; Christofi 87' (pen.)	Report		Stadium: GSP Stadium; Attendance: 6,078; Referee: Mark Clattenburg (England)

=== 2015 ===
28 March 2015 Euro 2016 qualifying	Belgium	5–0	Cyprus	Brussels, Belgium
20:45 UTC+1	Fellaini 21', 66'; Benteke 35'; Hazard 67'; Batshuayi 80'	Report		Stadium: King Baudouin Stadium; Attendance: 45,213; Referee: Ovidiu Hațegan (Romania)

12 June 2015 Euro 2016 qualifying	Andorra	1–3	Cyprus	Andorra la Vella, Andorra
20:45 UTC+2	Júnior 2' (o.g.)	Report	Mytidis 14', 45', 53'	Stadium: Estadi Nacional; Attendance: 1,054; Referee: Tobias Welz (Germany)

3 September 2015 Euro 2016 qualifying	Cyprus	0–1	Wales	Nicosia, Cyprus
21:45 UTC+3		Report	Bale 82'	Stadium: GSP Stadium; Attendance: 14,992; Referee: Szymon Marciniak (Poland)

6 September 2015 Euro 2016 qualifying	Cyprus	0–1	Belgium	Nicosia, Cyprus
21:45 UTC+3		Report	Hazard 86'	Stadium: GSP Stadium; Attendance: 11,866; Referee: Vladislav Bezborodov (Russia)

10 October 2015 Euro 2016 qualifying	Israel	1–2	Cyprus	Jerusalem, Israel
20:45 UTC+3	Bitton 76'	Report	Júnior 58'; Demetriou 80'	Stadium: Teddy Stadium; Attendance: 25,300; Referee: Jorge Sousa (Portugal)

13 October 2015 Euro 2016 qualifying	Cyprus	2–3	Bosnia and Herzegovina	Nicosia, Cyprus
21:45 UTC+3	Charalampidis 32'; Mytidis 41'	Report	Medunjanin 13', 44'; Đurić 67'	Stadium: GSP Stadium; Attendance: 17,687; Referee: Anthony Taylor (England)

=== 2016 ===
24 March 2016 Friendly	Ukraine	1–0	Cyprus	Odesa, Ukraine
21:00 UTC+2	Stepanenko 40'	Report		Stadium: Chornomorets Stadium; Attendance: 20,598; Referee: Orel Grinfeld (Israel)

25 May 2016 Friendly	Serbia	2–1	Cyprus	Užice, Serbia
17:00 UTC+2	Mitrović 2'; Maksimović 32' (o.g.)	Report	Tadić 10'	Stadium: Užice City Stadium; Attendance: 7,000; Referee: Pavle Radovanović (Montenegro)

6 September 2016 2018 World Cup qualification	Cyprus	0–3	Belgium	Nicosia, Cyprus
21:45 UTC+3		Report	Lukaku 13', 61'; Carrasco 81'	Stadium: GSP Stadium; Attendance: 12,029; Referee: Felix Zwayer (Germany)

7 October 2016 2018 World Cup qualification	Greece	2–0	Cyprus	Piraeus, Greece
21:45 UTC+3	Mitroglou 12'; Mantalos 42'	Report		Stadium: Karaiskakis Stadium; Attendance: 16,512; Referee: Pavel Královec (Czech Republic)

10 October 2016 2018 World Cup qualification	Bosnia and Herzegovina	2–0	Cyprus	Zenica, Bosnia and Herzegovina
20:45 UTC+2	Džeko 70', 81'	Report		Stadium: Bilino Polje Stadium; Attendance: 8,900; Referee: Xavier Estrada Fernández (Spain)

13 November 2016 2018 World Cup qualification	Cyprus	3–1	Gibraltar	Nicosia, Cyprus
19:00 UTC+2	Laifis 29'; Sotiriou 65'; Sielis 87'	Report	Casciaro 51'	Stadium: GSP Stadium; Attendance: 3,151; Referee: Aleksandr Aliyev (Kazakhstan)

=== 2017 ===
22 March 2017 Friendly	Cyprus	3–1	Kazakhstan	Larnaca, Cyprus
18:00 UTC+2	Mytidis 55'; Katelaris 62'; Christofi 67'	Report	Nusserbayev 29'	Stadium: Antonis Papadopoulos Stadium; Attendance: 500; Referee: Rob Harvey (Ireland)

25 March 2017 2018 World Cup qualification	Cyprus	0–0	Estonia	Nicosia, Cyprus
19:00 UTC+2		Report		Stadium: GSP Stadium; Attendance: 3,864; Referee: Ville Nevalainen (Finland)

3 June 2017 Friendly	Portugal	4–0	Cyprus	Estoril, Portugal
16:00 UTC+1	Moutinho 3', 42'; Pizzi 63'; Silva 70'	Report		Stadium: Estádio António Coimbra da Mota; Attendance: 5,128; Referee: Davide Massa (Italy)

9 June 2017 2018 World Cup qualification	Gibraltar	1–2	Cyprus	Faro/Loulé, Portugal
19:45 UTC+1	Hernandez 30'	Report	R. Chipolina 10' (o.g.); Sotiriou 87'	Stadium: Estádio Algarve; Attendance: 488; Referee: Nikola Popov (Bulgaria)

31 August 2017 2018 World Cup qualification	Cyprus	3–2	Bosnia and Herzegovina	Nicosia, Cyprus
21:45 UTC+3	Christofi 65'; Laban 67'; Sotiriou 76'	Report	Šunjić 33'; Višća 44'	Stadium: GSP Stadium; Attendance: 4,143; Referee: Andre Marriner (England)

3 September 2017 2018 World Cup qualification	Estonia	1–0	Cyprus	Tallinn, Estonia
19:00 UTC+3	Käit 90+2'	Report		Stadium: A. Le Coq Arena; Attendance: 5,491; Referee: Adrien Jaccottet (Switzerland)

7 October 2017 2018 World Cup qualification	Cyprus	1–2	Greece	Nicosia, Cyprus
21:45 UTC+3	Sotiriou 17'	Report	Mitroglou 25'; Tziolis 26'	Stadium: GSP Stadium; Attendance: 7,222; Referee: Alberto Undiano Mallenco (Spain)

10 October 2017 2018 World Cup qualification	Belgium	4–0	Cyprus	Brussels, Belgium
20:45 UTC+2	E. Hazard 12', 63' (pen.); T. Hazard 52'; Lukaku 78'	Report		Stadium: King Baudouin Stadium; Attendance: 37,765; Referee: Luca Banti (Italy)

10 November 2017 Friendly	Georgia	1–0	Cyprus	Gori, Georgia
17:00 UTC+4	Kvilitaia 24'	Report		Stadium: Tengiz Burjanadze Stadium; Attendance: 4,100; Referee: Suren Baliyan (Armenia)

13 November 2017 Friendly	Armenia	3–2	Cyprus	Yerevan, Armenia
18:00 UTC+4	Ishkhanyan 17'; Haroyan 38'; Mkhitaryan 63' (pen.)	Report	Laifis 50'; Sotiriou 89'	Stadium: Vazgen Sargsyan Republican Stadium; Referee: George Vadachkoria (Georgia)

=== 2018 ===
23 March 2018 Friendly	Cyprus	0–0	Montenegro	Nicosia, Cyprus
18:00 UTC+2		Report		Stadium: GSP Stadium; Attendance: 300; Referee: Milorad Mažić (Serbia)

20 May 2018 Friendly	Jordan	3–0	Cyprus	Amman, Jordan
23:00 UTC+3	Bani Yaseen 18'; Siaj 37'; Al-Rawashdeh 86'	Report		Stadium: Amman International Stadium; Referee: Hussein Abou (Lebanon)

6 September 2018 2018–19 Nations League	Norway	2–0	Cyprus	Oslo, Norway
20:45 UTC+2	Johansen 21', 42'	Report		Stadium: Ullevaal Stadion; Attendance: 6,572; Referee: István Kovács (Romania)

9 September 2018 2018–19 Nations League	Cyprus	2–1	Slovenia	Nicosia, Cyprus
21:45 UTC+3	Sotiriou 69'; Stojanović 89' (o.g.)	Report	Berić 54'	Stadium: GSP Stadium; Attendance: 1,115; Referee: Andris Treimanis (Latvia)

13 October 2018 2018–19 Nations League	Bulgaria	2–1	Cyprus	Sofia, Bulgaria
21:45 UTC+3	Despodov 59'; Nedelev 68'	Report	Kastanos 41'	Stadium: Vasil Levski National Stadium; Attendance: 10,000; Referee: Srđan Jovanović (Serbia)

16 October 2018 2018–19 Nations League	Slovenia	1–1	Cyprus	Ljubljana, Slovenia
20:45 UTC+2	Skubic 83'	Report	Papoulis 37'	Stadium: Stožice Stadium; Attendance: 5,318; Referee: Mads-Kristoffer Kristoffersen (Denmark)

16 November 2018 2018–19 Nations League	Cyprus	1–1	Bulgaria	Nicosia, Cyprus
21:45 UTC+2	Zachariou 24'	Report	Dimitrov 89' (pen.)	Stadium: GSP Stadium; Attendance: 3,844; Referee: Mohammed Al-Hakim (Sweden)

19 November 2018 2018–19 Nations League	Cyprus	0–2	Norway	Nicosia, Cyprus
21:45 UTC+2		Report	Kamara 36', 48'	Stadium: GSP Stadium; Attendance: 1,513; Referee: István Vad (Hungary)

=== 2019 ===
21 March 2019 Euro 2020 qualifying	Cyprus	5–0	San Marino	Nicosia, Cyprus
18:00 UTC+2	Sotiriou 19' (pen.), 23' (pen.); Kousoulos 26'; Efrem 31'; Laifis 56'	Report		Stadium: GSP Stadium; Attendance: 3,175; Referee: Juri Frischer (Estonia)

24 March 2019 Euro 2020 qualifying	Cyprus	0–2	Belgium	Nicosia, Cyprus
21:45 UTC+2		Report	E. Hazard 10'; Batshuayi 18'	Stadium: GSP Stadium; Attendance: 8,728; Referee: François Letexier (France)

8 June 2019 Euro 2020 qualifying	Scotland	2–1	Cyprus	Glasgow, Scotland
19:45 UTC+1	Robertson 61'; Burke 89'	Report	Kousoulos 87'	Stadium: Hampden Park; Attendance: 31,277; Referee: Ola Hobber Nilsen (Norway)

11 June 2019 Euro 2020 qualifying	Russia	1–0	Cyprus	Nizhny Novgorod, Russia
21:45 UTC+3	Ionov 38'	Report		Stadium: Nizhny Novgorod Stadium; Attendance: 42,228; Referee: Marco Di Bello (Italy)

6 September 2019 Euro 2020 qualifying	Cyprus	1–1	Kazakhstan	Nicosia, Cyprus
19:00 UTC+3	Sotiriou 39'	Report	Shchotkin 2'	Stadium: GSP Stadium; Attendance: 5,639; Referee: Mattias Gestranius (Finland)

9 September 2019 Euro 2020 qualifying	San Marino	0–4	Cyprus	Serravalle, San Marino
20:45 UTC+2		Report	Kousoulos 2', 73'; Papoulis 39'; Artymatas 75'	Stadium: San Marino Stadium; Attendance: 662; Referee: Iwan Griffith (Wales)

10 October 2019 Euro 2020 qualifying	Kazakhstan	1–2	Cyprus	Nur-Sultan, Kazakhstan
20:00 UTC+6	Yerlanov 34'	Report	Sotiriou 73'; N. Ioannou 84'	Stadium: Astana Arena; Attendance: 11,769; Referee: Craig Pawson (England)

13 October 2019 Euro 2020 qualifying	Cyprus	0–5	Russia	Nicosia, Cyprus
19:00 UTC+3		Report	Cheryshev 9', 90+2'; Ozdoyev 23'; Dzyuba 79'; Golovin 89'	Stadium: GSP Stadium; Attendance: 9,439; Referee: Srđan Jovanović (Serbia)

16 November 2019 Euro 2020 qualifying	Cyprus	1–2	Scotland	Nicosia, Cyprus
16:00 UTC+2	Efrem 47'	Report	Christie 12'; McGinn 53'	Stadium: GSP Stadium; Attendance: 7,595; Referee: Harald Lechner (Austria)

19 November 2019 Euro 2020 qualifying	Belgium	6–1	Cyprus	Brussels, Belgium
20:45 UTC+1	Benteke 16', 68'; De Bruyne 36', 41'; Carrasco 44'; Christoforou 51' (o.g.)	Report	N. Ioannou 14'	Stadium: King Baudouin Stadium; Attendance: 40,568; Referee: Jørgen Burchardt (Denmark)
