= Charalambos Charalambous =

Charalambos Charalambous may refer to:

- Bambos Charalambous (born 1967), British politician
- Charalampos Charalampous (born 2002), Cypriot footballer
