= Yasemi =

Yasemi is a surname. Notable people with the surname include:

- Mihalis Yasemi (died 2017), Cypriot footballer
- Siamak Yasemi (1925–1994), Iranian director, screenwriter, producer, and poet
