= Nikakis Kantzilieris =

Cypriot footballer (born 1943)

Personal information
- Date of birth: 1943 (age 82–83)
- Place of birth: Nicosia, Cyprus
- Position: Right midfielder

Senior career*
Years	Team	Apps	(Gls)
1961–1972	APOEL	152	(29)

International career
	Cyprus	8	(1)
- * Club domestic league appearances and goals

Nikakis Kantzilieris (Greek: Νικάκης Καντζηλιέρης, born 1943) is a former Cypriot football player. He began his football career at Othellos Athienou but he became famous playing for APOEL. Nikakis was known for his speed and his acuteness. He had not been a great scorer but his abilities made him a serious threat for his opponents. Playing for APOEL, he won the Cypriot Championship in 1965 and the Cypriot Cup in 1963, 1968 and 1969.
