= Panikos Iakovou =

Cypriot footballer (1941–2010)

Personal information
- Date of birth: 31 March 1941
- Date of death: 25 April 2010 (aged 69)
- Position: Defender

Senior career*
Years	Team	Apps	(Gls)
- Anorthosis Famagusta

International career
1965–1968	Cyprus	11	(0)

Managerial career
- 1984–1987: Cyprus
- * Club domestic league appearances and goals

Panikos Iakovou (31 March 1941 – 25 April 2010) was a Cypriot footballer who played as a defender. He made eleven appearances for the Cyprus national team from 1965 to 1968.
