= Panikos Georgiou =

Cypriot football manager

Personal information
- Full name: Panagiotis Georgiou
- Date of birth: 9 February 1954 (age 72)
- Place of birth: Nicosia, British Cyprus
- Height: 1.78 m (5 ft 10 in)

Team information
- Current team: ENTHOI Lakatamia FC

Panikos Georgiou was the manager of ENTHOI Lakatamia FC. He is considered to be one of the best Cypriot managers of all time. He is best known for the two years he managed the Cyprus national football team and is remembered for the historical victory against Spain, 3-2. Panikos Georgiou is said to be "the manager of the first half".
