= Mateusz Musiałowski =

Polish footballer (born 2003)

Personal information
- Full name: Mateusz Konrad Musiałowski
- Date of birth: 16 October 2003 (age 23)
- Place of birth: Katowice, Poland
- Height: 1.75 m (5 ft 9 in)
- Positions: Midfielder; forward

Team information
- Current team: Omonia
- Number: 33

Youth career
- 2009–2013: Ajaks Częstochowa
- 2013–2016: Raków Częstochowa
- 2015–2016: → Skra Częstochowa (loan)
- 2016–2020: SMS Łódź
- 2020–2024: Liverpool

Senior career*
Years	Team	Apps	(Gls)
2024	Liverpool	0	(0)
2024–	Omonia	11	(1)

International career
2018	Poland U15	4	(0)
2018	Poland U16	4	(0)
2019	Poland U17	1	(0)
2022–2023	Poland U21	5	(1)
- * Club domestic league appearances and goals as of 22:12, 19 December 2025 (UTC)

Mateusz Konrad Musiałowski (born 16 October 2003) is a Polish professional footballer who plays as a midfielder or forward for Cypriot First Division club Omonia.

== Early life ==
Born in Katowice, Poland, Musiałowski started his career at Ajaks Częstochowa at the age of five. Four years later, he joined the academy of Raków Częstochowa, before spending time on loan with Skra Częstochowa. Following his loan spell, Musiałowski joined SMS Łódź, where he would go on to score 133 goals in 88 games at youth level.

== Club career ==
=== Liverpool ===
After trials with Premier League side Arsenal, Musiałowski joined rivals Liverpool in August 2020. He signed his first professional contract in July 2021, and has trained with Liverpool's first team.

In July 2022, he made his unofficial Liverpool debut, coming on as a substitute in a 3–0 friendly defeat to Strasbourg.

Musiałowski was set to join Austrian Bundesliga side TSV Hartberg in the summer of 2023, before the deal collapsed at the last minute.

He made his first team debut as a second-half substitute on 14 March 2024 in a 6–1 Europa League win over Sparta Prague during the round of 16 at Anfield, becoming only the second Polish player to play for Liverpool (the other being Jerzy Dudek) and the first outfield Pole to make an official appearance for the Merseyside outfit.

Following the conclusion of the 2023–24 season, the club confirmed that Musiałowski would depart upon the expiration of his contract.

=== Omonia ===
Despite garnering interest from Polish top-tier clubs, Musiałowski decided to continue his career abroad. On 5 August 2024, he signed a three-year deal with Cypriot club Omonia, where he joined his compatriot Mariusz Stępiński.

On 4 September 2026, the media reported Musiałowski was to join another Nicosia-based club Olympiakos Nicosia on loan for the rest of the season. Four days later, the move was cancelled.

== International career ==
Musiałowski has represented Poland at numerous youth levels.

== Style of play ==
Comfortable playing in midfield, or further forward on either wing, Musiałowski has been compared to footballing legend Lionel Messi, earning the nickname "the Polish Messi". Musiałowski himself has stated that he models his style of play on the Argentine's, and notably scored a Messi-esque goal against Newcastle United's under-18s in March 2021; a goal which was later named the under-18 Premier League goal of the season. He has also been compared to former Chelsea and Real Madrid superstar Eden Hazard for his dribbling ability. Musialowski is said to idolise Messi and said in an interview that he would choose him over Cristiano Ronaldo.

== Career statistics ==
As of match played 1 December 2025

Appearances and goals by club, season and competition
Club	Season	League			National cup (Note: Includes Cypriot Cup)		League cup		Europe		Other		Total	
Club	Season	Division	Apps	Goals	Apps	Goals	Apps	Goals	Apps	Goals	Apps	Goals	Apps	Goals
Liverpool U21	2021–22	—			—		—		—		2 (Note: Appearance(s) in the EFL Trophy)	0	2	0
Liverpool U21	2022–23	—			—		—		—		1	0	1	0
Liverpool U21	2023–24	—			—		—		—		4	3	4	3
Liverpool U21	Total	—			—		—		—		7	3	7	3
Liverpool	2023–24	Premier League	0	0	0	0	0	0	1 (Note: Appearances in UEFA Europa League)	0	0	0	1	0
Omonia	2024–25	Cypriot First Division	9	1	2	0	—		1 (Note: Appearance in UEFA Conference League)	0	0	0	12	1
Omonia	2025–26	Cypriot First Division	2	0	0	0	—		1	1	0	0	3	1
Omonia	2026–27	Cypriot First Division	0	0	0	0	—		0	0	0	0	0	0
Omonia	Total		11	1	2	0	—		2	1	0	0	15	2
Career total			11	1	2	0	0	0	3	1	7	3	23	5

== Honours ==
Omonia

- Cypriot First Division: 2025–26
