= Pambos Avraamidis =

Cypriot footballer and manager (1915–2005)

Personal information
- Date of birth: 6 February 1915
- Place of birth: British Cyprus
- Date of death: 22 May 2005 (aged 90)
- Position: Midfielder

Senior career*
Years	Team	Apps	(Gls)
1932–1950	APOEL		

Managerial career
- 1953–1955: Omonia Nicosia
- 1968–1969: Cyprus
- 1972–1974: Cyprus
- 1975: Cyprus
- * Club domestic league appearances and goals

Pambos Avraamidis (Greek: Πάμπος Αβρααμίδης; 6 March 1915 – 22 May 2005) was a Cypriot football manager and footballer who last managed Orfeas Nicosia.

== Career ==
Avraamidis has been regarded as one of the most important figures in Cypriot football during the 20th century.

== Playing and managerial career ==
Avraamidis played for APOEL from 1932 until his retirement in 1950, primarily as a left-sided midfielder. He became the team's captain in 1941 and won eight league championships during his playing career. On 7 November 1934, he scored APOEL's first goal in an official competition, securing a 1–0 victory against EPA Larnaca in a cup match.

He later managed the Cyprus national football team during three separate periods: 1968–1969, 1972–1974 and 1975. Under his management, Cyprus recorded its first victory in an official international competition, defeating Switzerland 2–1 on 17 February 1968. He also guided Cyprus to a 1–0 victory over Northern Ireland in February 1973, the country's first win in a World Cup qualifying match.
