= 2021–22 Cypriot Cup =

80th season of Cypriot Cup

2021–22 Cyprus Coca-Cola Cup

Tournament details
- Country: Cyprus
- Dates: 22 September 2021 – May 2022
- Teams: 23

Final positions
- Champions: Omonia Nicosia
- Runners-up: Ethnikos Achna

Tournament statistics
- Matches played: 28
- Goals scored: 88 (3.14 per match)

The 2021–22 Cypriot Cup was the 80th edition of the Cypriot Cup. A total of 23 clubs entered the competition. It began in September 2021 with the first round and concluded on 25 May 2022 with the final held at the GSP Stadium. Omonia FC won the Cup for the 15th time and qualified for the 2022–23 Europa League play-off round.

== First round ==
The first round draw took place on 31 August 2021.

Team 1	Score	Team 2
22 September 2021
Alki Oroklini	0–4	AEK Larnaca
APOEL	2–0	Nea Salamis Famagusta
Apollon Limassol	3–1	Olympias Lympion
Omonia 29th May	0–1	Pafos FC
29 September 2021
Achyronas Liopetriou	0–4	Ethnikos Achna
Aris Limassol	2–2 (2–4 p)	Enosis Neon Paralimni
Doxa Katokopias	5–1	Akritas Chlorakas

== Second round ==
The matches were played between 12 January and 2 March 2022.

Team 1	Agg.	Team 2	1st leg	2nd leg
Pafos	1–3	Anorthosis Famagusta	1–3	0–0
Onisilos Sotira 2014	5–3	Karmiotissa	4–3	1–0
APOEL	6–1	Olympiakos Nicosia	2–1	4–0
Xylotymbou	1–7	Omonia Nicosia	0–5	1–2

== Quarter-finals ==
The matches were played between 9 March and 13 April 2022.

Team 1	Agg.	Team 2	1st leg	2nd leg
Ethnikos Achna	5–0	Enosis Neon Paralimni	1–0	4–0
APOEL	2–2 (a)	Anorthosis Famagusta	2–1	0–1
AEK Larnaca	13–1	Onisilos Sotira 2014	8–0	5–1
AEL Limassol	1–1 (a)	Omonia Nicosia	1–1	0–0

== Semi-finals ==
The matches were played on 26 April and 4 May 2022.

Team 1	Agg.	Team 2	1st leg	2nd leg
AEK Larnaca	2–5	Ethnikos Achna	1–2	1–3
Anorthosis Famagusta	1–3	Omonia Nicosia	0–2	1–1

== Final ==
25 May 2022
19:00 EEST

Omonia Nicosia	0–0 (a.e.t.)	Ethnikos Achna
	Report
Penalties
Šćepović (penalty missed); Yuste (penalty scored); Lang (penalty scored); Kakoullis (penalty missed); Bachirou (penalty scored); Loizou (penalty scored); Charalampous (penalty scored)	5–4	(penalty missed) Zakpa; (penalty scored) Abraham; (penalty missed) Khudobyak; (penalty scored) Elia; (penalty scored) Tarasovs; (penalty scored) Adoni; (penalty missed) Peratikos

GSP Stadium, Nicosia
Attendance: 17,095
Referee: (Italy) Marco Di Bello

== See also ==
- 2021–22 Cypriot First Division
- 2021–22 Cypriot Second Division
