= Mihalis Yasemi =

Cypriot footballer (died 2017)

Personal information
- Place of birth: Cyprus
- Date of death: 25 December 2017 (aged 78)
- Place of death: Australia
- Position: Right winger

Senior career*
Years	Team	Apps	(Gls)
1955–1963	Anorthosis Famagusta		

International career
1960	Cyprus	2	(2)
- * Club domestic league appearances and goals

Mihalis Yasemi (died 25 December 2017), known as Sialis, was a Cypriot footballer. He played for Anorthosis Famagusta from 1955 until 1963, when he retired at age 25 to emigrate to Australia. Deployed in different attacking positions but mostly as a right winger, he scored 69 goals in 95 appearances and was top scorer of his team from 1961 to 1963. Yasemi played in the Cyprus national team's first official match, which was against Israel, and also scored in his second and last appearance, also against Israel. He died on 25 December 2017 in Australia, where he lived, at the age of 78.
