= Loizos Loizou =

Cypriot footballer (born 2003)

Personal information
- Full name: Loizos Loizou
- Date of birth: 18 July 2003 (age 23)
- Place of birth: Nicosia, Cyprus
- Height: 1.69 m (5 ft 7 in)
- Position: Winger

Team information
- Current team: Red Star Belgrade
- Number: 75

Youth career
- 2010–2019: Omonia

Senior career*
Years	Team	Apps	(Gls)
2019–2025	Omonia	137	(21)
2024	→ Heerenveen (loan)	5	(0)
2025–2026	Hapoel Tel Aviv	31	(7)
2026–	Red Star Belgrade	10	(2)

International career^{‡}
2019	Cyprus U17	3	(1)
2020–	Cyprus	52	(3)
- * Club domestic league appearances and goals as of 21 November 2026 ‡ National team caps and goals as of 19:50, 12 November 2026 (UTC)

Loizos Loizou (Greek: Λοΐζος Λοΐζου; born 18 July 2003) is a Cypriot professional footballer who plays as a winger for Serbian SuperLiga club Red Star Belgrade.

== Club career ==
In January 2024, Loizou joined Dutch Eredivisie club Heerenveen on loan for the remainder of the season.

On 10 June 2026, Loizou joined Serbian SuperLiga club Red Star Belgrade on a four-year deal with an option for a fifth.

== International career ==
On 5 September 2020, he made his debut with Cyprus in a 0–2 defeat against Montenegro in the 2020–21 UEFA Nations League, becoming at 17 years, 1 month and 18 days Cyprus youngest player ever.

On 7 October 2020, during his third cap, he scored his first international goal in a 1–2 defeat in a friendly game against Czech Republic, becoming at 17 years, 2 months and 20 days Cyprus' youngest goalscorer ever.

== Career statistics ==
=== Club ===
As of match played 02 November 2026

Appearances and goals by club, season and competition
Club	Season	League			National cup (Note: Includes Cypriot Cup)		Continental		Other		Total	
Club	Season	Division	Apps	Goals	Apps	Goals	Apps	Goals	Apps	Goals	Apps	Goals
Omonia	2018–19	Cypriot First Division	2	0	—		—		—		2	0
Omonia	2019–20	Cypriot First Division	1	1	1	0	—		—		2	1
Omonia	2020–21	Cypriot First Division	27	2	2	0	7 (Note: Four appearances in UEFA Champions League, three appearances in UEFA Europa League)	0	—		36	2
Omonia	2021–22	Cypriot First Division	28	4	6	1	12 (Note: Two appearances in UEFA Champions League, four appearances and two goals in UEFA Europa League, six appearances in UEFA Europa Conference League)	2	0	0	46	7
Omonia	2022–23	Cypriot First Division	33	4	6	1	4 (Note: Appearances in UEFA Europa League)	0	0	0	43	5
Omonia	2023–24	Cypriot First Division	18	6	1	0	4 (Note: Appearances in UEFA Conference League)	0	1 (Note: Appearance in Cypriot Super Cup)	0	24	6
Omonia	2024–25	Cypriot First Division	27	4	4	4	8	0	—		39	8
Omonia	2025–26	Cypriot First Division	1	0	0	0	6	2	—		7	2
Omonia	Total		137	21	20	6	41	4	1	0	199	31
Heerenveen (loan)	2023–24	Eredivisie	5	0	—		—		—		5	0
Hapoel Tel Aviv	2025–26	Israeli Premier League	31	7	2	0	—		—		33	7
Red Star Belgrade	2026–27	Serbian SuperLiga	9	2	0	0	3 (Note: Three appearances in UEFA Champions League)	1	—		12	3
Career total			182	30	22	6	44	5	1	0	249	41

=== International ===
As of match played 12 November 2026

Appearances and goals by national team and year
National team	Year	Apps	Goals
Cyprus
Cyprus	2020	6	1
Cyprus	2021	9	0
Cyprus	2022	6	0
Cyprus	2023	6	0
Cyprus	2024	9	0
Cyprus	2025	9	2
Cyprus	2026	7	0
Total		52	3

Scores and results list Cyprus’ goal tally first, score column indicates score after each Loizou goal.

List of international goals scored by Loizos Loizou
No.	Date	Venue	Opponent	Score	Result	Competition
1	7 October 2020	AEK Arena, Larnaca, Cyprus	Czech Republic	1–1	1–2	Friendly
2	9 September 2025	GSP Stadium, Nicosia, Cyprus	Romania	1–2	2–2	2026 FIFA World Cup qualification
3	12 October 2025	San Marino Stadium, Serravalle, San Marino	San Marino	1–0	4–0	2026 FIFA World Cup qualification

== Honours ==
Omonia

- Cypriot First Division: 2020–21
- Cypriot Cup: 2021–22, 2022–23
- Cypriot Super Cup: 2021

Individual

- Cypriot First Division Young Player of the Year: 2020–21
- Cypriot First Division Team of the Year: 2020–21
