= Helmut Redl =

Austrian footballer

Personal information
- Date of birth: 17 September 1939
- Place of birth: Austria
- Position: Forward

Senior career*
| Years | Team | Apps | (Gls) |
| 1963–1966 | 1. Simmeringer SC | | |
| 1966–1968 | Wacker Innsbruck | 49 | (26) |
| 1968–1969 | SV Wattens | 26 | (14) |
| 1969–1970 | SK Rapid Wien | 30 | (12) |
| 1970–1971 | WSG Wattens | 30 | (12) |
| 1971–1973 | Alpine Donawitz | 26 | (3) |

International career
| 1967–1970 | Austria | 19 | (7) |
- * Club domestic league appearances and goals

Helmut Redl (born 17 September 1939) is a retired Austrian football forward who played for Austria. He also played for 1. Simmeringer SC, Wacker Innsbruck, SV Wattens, SK Rapid Wien and Alpine Donawitz.
