= Andronikos Kakoullis =

Cypriot footballer (born 2001)

Personal information
- Full name: Andronikos Kakoullis
- Date of birth: 3 May 2001 (age 25)
- Place of birth: Cyprus
- Height: 1.80 m (5 ft 11 in)
- Position: Forward

Team information
- Current team: Omonia
- Number: 9

Youth career
- Omonia

Senior career*
Years	Team	Apps	(Gls)
2018–2025	Omonia	140	(32)
2025–2026	AIK	14	(3)
2025–2026	→ Aris Limassol (loan)	33	(8)
2026–	Omonia	7	(0)

International career^{‡}
2017	Cyprus U17	2	(0)
2018	Cyprus U19	9	(2)
2021	Cyprus U21	3	(3)
2020–	Cyprus	41	(8)
- * Club domestic league appearances and goals as of 03 November 2026 ‡ National team caps and goals as of 17:15, 5 October 2026 (UTC)

Andronikos Kakoullis (Greek: Ανδρόνικος Κακουλλής; born 3 May 2001) is a Cypriot footballer who plays as a forward for Omonia and the Cyprus national team.

== Club career ==
Having come through Omonia's academy, Kakoullis would make his first team debut aged 17, coming on as a substitute in the dying minutes of a home game against Apollon Limassol in the Cypriot League. His first goal for the club came on 22 December 2019, in a 3–2 home win against AEK Larnaca.

Kakoullis scored his first goal in a European Competition on 3 December 2020, opening the score in an eventual 2–1 win over PAOK in the Europa League group stage, in Omonia's first ever win at group stage level. That same season, he earned his first trophy, winning the 2020–21 Cypriot First Division with Omonia; He scored two goals in 15 appearances in the competition.

The following season, Kakoullis won the 2021 Cypriot Super Cup and the 2021–22 Cup with Omonia. He came on as a substitute in both the Super Cup game, and the Cup final.

In the 2022–23 season, he made his 100th appearance for Omonia, captaining his team for the first time, in an away game against Manchester United in the Europa League group stage. He also won the Cypriot Cup with Omonia for the second year in a row. Kakoullis was in his team's starting lineup for the final.

In Omonia's 3–1 home victory over Rapid Wien during the league phase of the 2024–25 Conference League, Kakoullis scored his 10th goal in European competitions, making him the club's second-highest all-time European goalscorer.

In August 2024, Kakoullis was linked with a move to Swedish side IFK Göteborg, but the negotiations ultimately failed. In March 2025, he signed with another Swedish club, AIK, where he replaced his Cypriot teammate Ioannis Pittas.

On 22 July 2025, Kakoullis returned to Cyprus and joined Aris Limassol on a season-long loan with an obligation to buy.

== International career ==
Kakoullis made his national team debut on 7 October 2020 in a friendly against Czech Republic. He scored his first international goal in a 1–2 loss against Slovenia at the 2022 FIFA World Cup qualifiers.

== Career statistics ==
=== Club ===
As of 23 October 2026

Club	Season	League			National Cup		Continental		Other		Total	
Club	Season	Division	Apps	Goals	Apps	Goals	Apps	Goals	Apps	Goals	Apps	Goals
Omonia	2017–18	Cypriot First Division	1	0	0	0	—		—		1	0
Omonia	2018–19	Cypriot First Division	1	0	0	0	—		—		1	0
Omonia	2019–20	Cypriot First Division	14	2	4	1	—		—		18	3
Omonia	2020–21	Cypriot First Division	15	2	0	0	7	1	—		22	3
Omonia	2021–22	Cypriot First Division	30	5	7	1	12	3	1	0	50	9
Omonia	2022–23	Cypriot First Division	26	8	4	0	6	1	1	0	37	9
Omonia	2023–24	Cypriot First Division	31	9	5	1	4	1	1	0	41	11
Omonia	2024–25	Cypriot First Division	22	6	1	0	14	4	—		37	10
Omonia	Total		140	32	21	3	43	10	3	0	207	45
AIK	2025	Allsvenskan	14	3	—		—		—		14	3
Aris Limassol (loan)	2025–26	Cypriot First Division	33	8	2	0	4	2	—		39	10
Omonia	2026–27	Cypriot First Division	5	0	—		8	1	1	0	14	1
Career total			192	43	23	3	55	13	3	0	273	59

== International goals ==
Scores and results list Cyprus's goal tally first.

No.	Date	Venue	Opponent	Score	Result	Competition
1.	14 November 2021	Stožice Stadium, Ljubljana, Slovenia	Slovenia	1–2	1–2	2022 FIFA World Cup qualification
2.	12 June 2022	Windsor Park, Belfast, Northern Ireland	Northern Ireland	1–0	2–2	2022–23 UEFA Nations League
3.	12 June 2022	Windsor Park, Belfast, Northern Ireland	Northern Ireland	2–0	2–2	2022–23 UEFA Nations League
4.	11 June 2024	San Marino Stadium, Serravalle, San Marino	San Marino	4–1	4–1	Friendly
5.	21 March 2025	AEK Arena, Larnaca, Cyprus	San Marino	2–0	2–0	2026 FIFA World Cup qualification
6.	12 October 2025	San Marino Stadium, Serravalle, San Marino	San Marino	4–0	4–0	2026 FIFA World Cup qualification
7.	18 November 2025	Alphamega Stadium, Limassol, Cyprus	Estonia	2–1	2–4	Friendly
8.	2 October 2026	GSP Stadium, Nicosia, Cyprus	Armenia	2–0	2–0	2026–27 UEFA Nations League

== Honours ==
Omonia

- Cypriot First Division: 2020–21
- Cypriot Cup: 2021–22, 2022–23
- Cypriot Super Cup: 2021

Individual

- Cypriot First Division Young Player of the Year: 2022–23
- Cypriot First Division Team of the Year: 2023–24
