= Ioannis Kousoulos =

Cypriot footballer (born 1996)

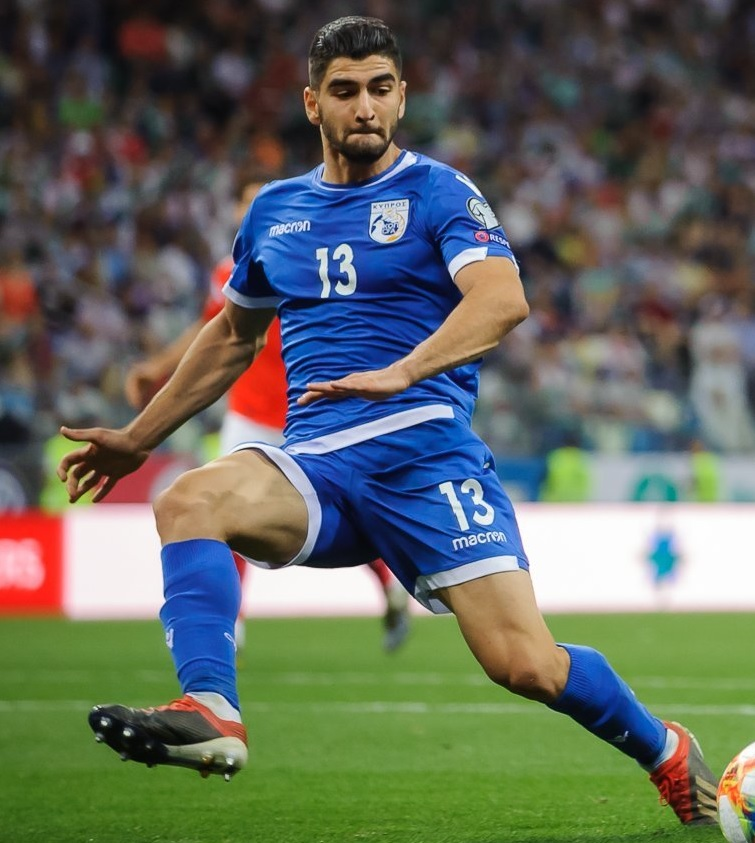
- Kousoulos with the Cyprus national team in 2019

Personal information
- Full name: Ioannis Kousoulos
- Date of birth: 14 June 1996 (age 30)
- Place of birth: Limassol, Cyprus
- Height: 1.81 m (5 ft 11 1/2 in)
- Positions: Defensive midfielder; defender

Team information
- Current team: A.E. Kifisia
- Number: 31

Youth career
- 2010–2014: Nea Salamina

Senior career*
Years	Team	Apps	(Gls)
2013–2018	Nea Salamina	119	(3)
2018–2026	Omonia	182	(16)
2026–	A.E. Kifisia	1	(0)

International career^{‡}
2014	Cyprus U-19	6	(0)
2015–2017	Cyprus U-21	16	(0)
2018–	Cyprus	50	(4)
- * Club domestic league appearances and goals as of 10 September 2026 ‡ National team caps and goals as of 17:50, 30 March 2026 (UTC)

Ioannis Kousoulos (Greek: Ιωάννης Κούσουλος; born 14 June 1996) is a Cypriot professional footballer who plays as a defensive midfielder for Super League Greece club A.E. Kifisia and the Cyprus national team.

== Career ==
Born in Limassol, Kousoulos signed his first professional contract with Nea Salamina at the age of 18.

On 3 July 2018, Kousoulos joined Omonia on a four-year contract. In August 2020, he renewed his contract until 2024.

Kousoulos started the vast majority of Omonia's games in the 2020–21 season, in which he helped his team win the domestic league, and was named Omonia's vice-captain. He was given the nickname "Machine" by then Omonia coach Henning Berg.

On 20 July 2021, Kousoulos sustained a knee cartilage injury in a Champions League qualifier against Dinamo Zagreb, which kept him out of action for the entirety of the 2021–22 season. He made his return on 3 September 2022, coming on as a substitute in a 3–2 home win against AEK Larnaca in the Cypriot League. He ended the 2022–23 season as Cup winner with Omonia.

On 4 September 2026, Kousoulos signed for A.E. Kifisia on a free transfer.

== Career statistics ==
=== Club ===
As of 01 Sep 2026

Appearances and goals by club, season and competition
Club	Season	League			Cypriot Cup		Continental		Other		Total	
Club	Season	Division	Apps	Goals	Apps	Goals	Apps	Goals	Apps	Goals	Apps	Goals
Nea Salamina	2013–14	Cypriot First Division	15	0	2	0	—		—		17	0
Nea Salamina	2014–15	Cypriot First Division	14	1	1	0	—		—		15	1
Nea Salamina	2015–16	Cypriot First Division	31	0	2	0	—		—		33	0
Nea Salamina	2016–17	Cypriot First Division	28	1	1	0	—		—		29	1
Nea Salamina	2017–18	Cypriot First Division	31	1	2	0	—		—		33	1
Nea Salamina	Total		119	3	8	0	—		—		127	3
Omonia	2018–19	Cypriot First Division	28	0	2	0	—		—		30	0
Omonia	2019–20	Cypriot First Division	10	1	4	2	—		—		14	3
Omonia	2020–21	Cypriot First Division	35	4	2	0	10 (Note: Four appearances in UEFA Champions League, six appearances in UEFA Europa League)	0	—		47	4
Omonia	2021–22	Cypriot First Division	0	0	0	0	1 (Note: Appearance in UEFA Champions League)	0	—		1	0
Omonia	2022–23	Cypriot First Division	26	0	3	0	2 (Note: Appearances in UEFA Europa League)	0	0	0	31	0
Omonia	2023–24	Cypriot First Division	33	5	4	0	3 (Note: Appearances in UEFA Conference League)	0	1 (Note: Appearance in Cypriot Super Cup)	0	41	5
Omonia	2024–25	Cypriot First Division	27	3	1	0	11	0	—		39	3
Omonia	2025–26	Cypriot First Division	22	3	2	0	11	0	—		35	3
Omonia	2026–27	Cypriot First Division	1	0	—		3	0	—		4	0
Omonia	Total		182	16	18	2	41	0	1	0	243	18
Career total			301	19	26	2	41	0	1	0	370	21

=== International ===
As of match played 30 March 2026

Appearances and goals by national team and year
National team	Year	Apps	Goals
Cyprus
Cyprus	2018	8	0
Cyprus	2019	10	4
Cyprus	2020	7	0
Cyprus	2021	4	0
Cyprus	2022	0	0
Cyprus	2023	10	0
Cyprus	2024	4	0
Cyprus	2025	6	0
Cyprus	2026	1	0
Total		50	4

Scores and results list Cyprus' goal tally first, score column indicates score after each Kousoulos goal.

List of international goals scored by Ioannis Kousoulos
No.	Date	Venue	Opponent	Score	Result	Competition
1	21 March 2019	GSP Stadium, Nicosia, Cyprus	San Marino	3–0	5–0	UEFA Euro 2020 qualification
2	8 June 2019	Hampden Park, Glasgow, Scotland	Scotland	1–1	1–2	UEFA Euro 2020 qualification
3	9 September 2019	San Marino Stadium, Serravalle, San Marino	San Marino	1–0	4–0	UEFA Euro 2020 qualification
4	9 September 2019	San Marino Stadium, Serravalle, San Marino	San Marino	3–0	4–0	UEFA Euro 2020 qualification

== Honours ==
Omonia

- Cypriot First Division: 2020–21, 2025–26
- Cypriot Cup: 2021–22, 2022–23
- Cypriot Super Cup: 2021

Individual

- Cypriot First Division Team of the Year: 2023–24
- UEFA Euro 2020 Team of the Qualifiers: UEFA Euro 2020 qualifying
