= Charalampos Charalampous =

Cypriot footballer (born 2002)

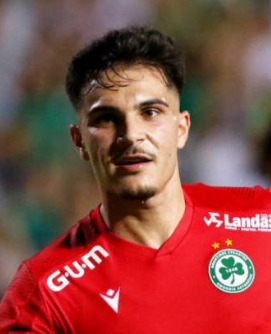
- Charalampous in 2022

Personal information
- Full name: Charalampos Charalampous
- Date of birth: 4 April 2002 (age 24)
- Place of birth: Larnaca, Cyprus
- Height: 1.72 m (5 ft 8 in)
- Position: Midfielder

Team information
- Current team: Aris Limassol
- Number: 8

Youth career
- 2014-2016: Arsenal Academy
- 2016-2019: PAOK Academy
- 2019: Omonia

Senior career*
Years	Team	Apps	(Gls)
2019–2025	Omonia	100	(1)
2025–	Aris Limassol	34	(2)

International career^{‡}
2022–	Cyprus	33	(4)
- * Club domestic league appearances and goals as of 23 Oct 2026 ‡ National team caps and goals as of 20:55, 15 November 2026 (UTC)

Charalampos Charalampous (Greek: Χαράλαμπος Χαραλάμπους; born 4 April 2002) is a Cypriot professional footballer who plays as a midfielder for Aris Limassol and the Cyprus national team.

== Club career ==
Having come through PAOK's academy, Charalampous signed his first professional contract as a professional footballer in 2018, with Cypriot First Division club Omonia. Just after turning 17, he made his first team debut on 14 April 2019, coming on as a substitute in a league game against Apollon Limassol.

Charalampous is also listed among the graduates of UK-based development academy AF Global Football, which highlights players who have progressed into the professional game.

On 25 May 2022, Charalampous scored the decisive penalty to win the 2021–22 Cypriot Cup for Omonia. He scored his first goal for the club on 18 August 2022 against Gent in the Europa League playoffs.

On 14 November 2022, he renewed his contract with Omonia until 2026. He ended the season by winning the 2022–23 Cypriot Cup with Omonia for the second year in a row. He came on as a substitute in the final.

== International career ==
Charalampous made his national team debut on 24 September 2022, coming on as a substitute in a 1–0 win against Greece in the UEFA Nations League. He scored his first goal with Cyprus on 20 November 2022 in a friendly match that was won 3-2 against Israel.

== Personal life ==
Charalampous is the nephew of former Omonia player and Cypriot international Lefteris Kontolefteros.

== Career statistics ==
=== Club ===
As of match played 19 May 2025

Appearances and goals by club, season and competition
Club	Season	League			Cup (Note: Includes Cypriot Cup)		Europe (Note: Includes UEFA Europa League and UEFA Conference League)		Other (Note: Includes Cypriot Super Cup)		Total	
Club	Season	Division	Apps	Goals	Apps	Goals	Apps	Goals	Apps	Goals	Apps	Goals
Omonia	2018–19	Cypriot First Division	4	0	—		—		—		4	0
Omonia	2019–20	Cypriot First Division	1	0	1	0	—		—		2	0
Omonia	2020–21	Cypriot First Division	2	0	0	0	—		—		2	0
Omonia	2021–22	Cypriot First Division	13	0	6	0	3	0	1	0	23	0
Omonia	2022–23	Cypriot First Division	27	0	5	1	8	2	1	0	41	3
Omonia	2023–24	Cypriot First Division	34	0	5	0	3	0	1	0	43	0
Omonia	2024–25	Cypriot First Division	19	1	4	0	10	0	—		34	1
Omonia	Total		100	1	21	1	24	2	3	0	148	4
Career total			100	1	21	1	24	2	3	0	148	4

=== International ===
As of match played 15 November 2026

Appearances and goals by national team and year
National team	Year	Apps	Goals
Cyprus	2022	3	1
Cyprus	2023	12	0
Cyprus	2024	4	0
Cyprus	2025	9	1
Cyprus	2026	5	2
Total		33	4

No.	Date	Venue	Opponent	Score	Result	Competition
1.	20 November 2022	HaMoshava Stadium, Petah Tikva, Israel	Israel	1–0	3–2	Friendly
2.	9 September 2025	GSP Stadium, Nicosia, Cyprus	Romania	2–2	2–2	2026 FIFA World Cup qualification
3.	30 March 2026	GSP Stadium, Nicosia, Cyprus	Moldova	2–0	3–2	Friendly
4.	30 March 2026	GSP Stadium, Nicosia, Cyprus	Moldova	3–0	3–2	Friendly

== Honours ==
Omonia

- Cypriot First Division: 2020–21
- Cypriot Cup: 2021–22, 2022–23
- Cypriot Super Cup: 2021

Individual

- Cypriot First Division Young Player of the Year: 2023–24
