= Cyprus national football team =

Men's association football team

Cyprus
- Association: Cyprus Football Association (CFA); Κυπριακή Ομοσπονδία Ποδοσφαίρου; Kıbrıs Futbol Federasyonu
- Confederation: UEFA (Europe)
- Head coach: Akis Mantzios
- Captain: Grigoris Kastanos
- Most caps: Ioannis Okkas (106)
- Top scorer: Michalis Konstantinou (32)
- Home stadium: GSP Stadium
- FIFA code: CYP
First colours	Second colours

FIFA ranking
- Current: 127 ▼2 (18 November 2026)
- Highest: 43 (September 2010)
- Lowest: 142 (June 2014)

First international
- Unofficial: Israel 3–1 Cyprus (Tel Aviv, Israel; 30 July 1949); Official: Cyprus 1–1 Israel (Nicosia, Cyprus; 13 November 1960)

Biggest win
- Cyprus 5–0 Andorra (Limassol, Cyprus; 15 November 2000); Cyprus 5–0 Andorra (Nicosia, Cyprus; 16 November 2014); Cyprus 5–0 San Marino (Nicosia, Cyprus; 21 March 2019)

Biggest defeat
- West Germany 12–0 Cyprus (Essen, West Germany; 21 May 1969)

The Cyprus national football team (Greek: Εθνική ομάδα ποδοσφαίρου της Κύπρου, romanized: Ethnikí omáda podosfaírou tis Kýprou), represents Cyprus in men's international football and is controlled by the Cyprus Football Association. The team's home ground is the GSP Stadium in Nicosia.

== History ==
=== Early history ===
The team's first match took place on 23 July 1949, one year after becoming a member of the world governing body FIFA: a friendly against Maccabi Tel Aviv in Tel Aviv, ending in a 3–3 draw. Seven days later, the team had its first international game: a 3–1 defeat by Israel in the same city.

In November 1960, following independence from British rule, Cyprus drew its first post-independence official match 1–1 against Israel, as part of the 1962 FIFA World Cup qualifying tournament. Cyprus' first international victory was a 3–1 win over Greece on 27 November 1963 in a friendly. On 17 February 1968, Cyprus recorded their first competitive win, beating Switzerland 2–1 in a European Championship qualifying match in Old GSP Stadium in Nicosia.

In 1974, the national team enjoyed one of their most famous victories when they beat Northern Ireland 1–0 in Nicosia. On 12 February 1983, as part of the Euro 1984 qualifiers, Cyprus held defending World Cup champions Italy to a 1–1 draw in Tsirio Stadium in Limassol, followed a month later by the same result against Czechoslovakia. Four years later, in the Euro 1988 qualification, Cyprus recorded their first ever point achieved in an away match, against Poland. In 1989 they drew 1–1 with France in the World Cup qualifying match. Despite a number of triumphs on home soil, Cyprus had to wait until 1992 to record their first away win: a 2–0 victory against the Faroe Islands.

Results in qualifying tournaments had improved considerably in the following years; In the qualifying stages for the 1996 UEFA European Championship, Cyprus drew 1–1 with holders Denmark. Four years later, they missed out on a place in the UEFA Euro 2000 despite 3–2 victories against both Spain and Israel and a 4–0 win over San Marino.

=== 2000s ===
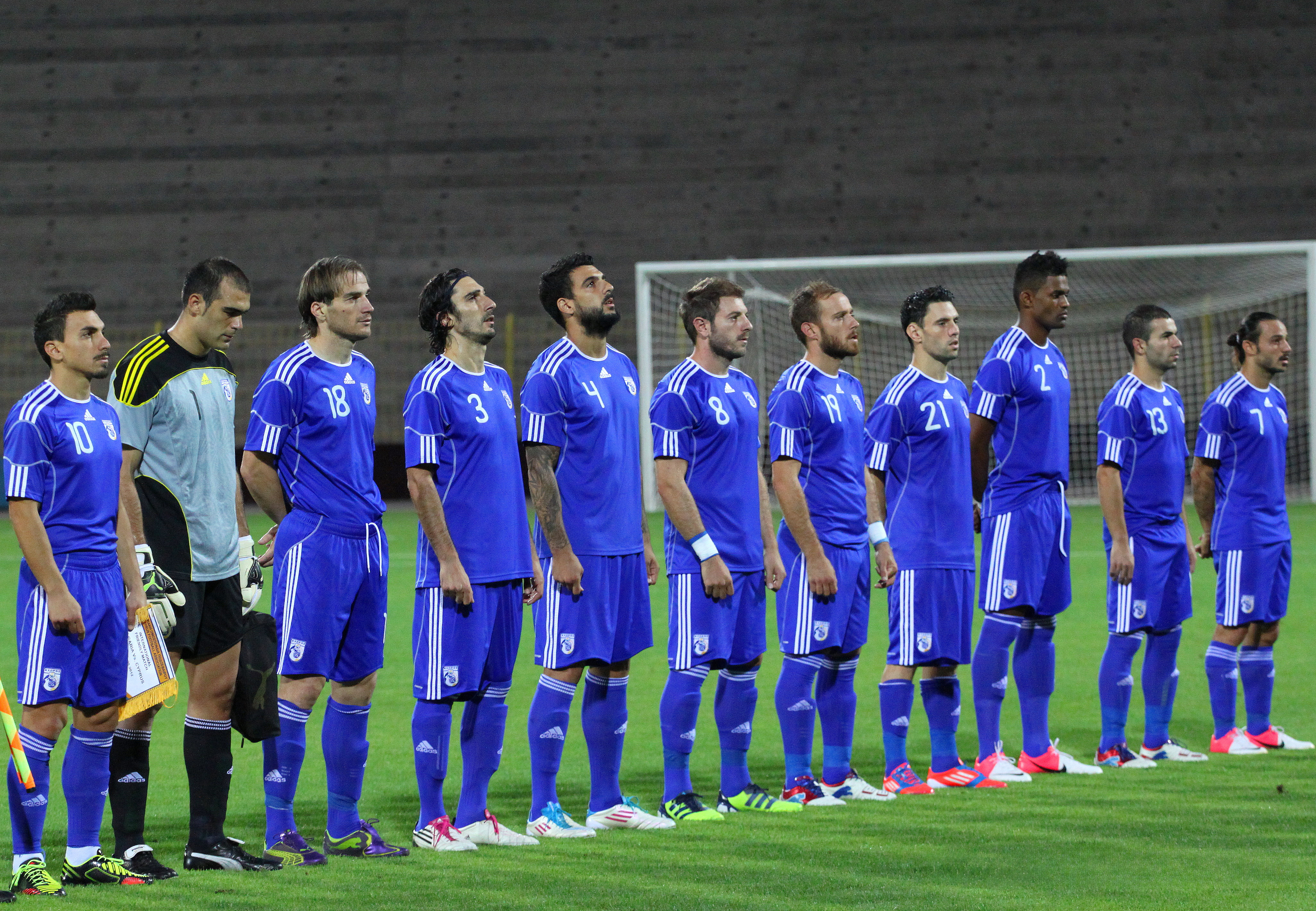
Cyprus national team against Bulgaria in 2012.

On 15 November 2000, Cyprus scored their biggest win in history by beating Andorra in Limassol 5–0 in the 2002 FIFA World Cup qualification. On 7 October 2006, as part of the Euro 2008 qualifiers, Cyprus caused a major upset by beating the Republic of Ireland 5–2 at GSP Stadium in Nicosia, with Michalis Konstantinou and Constantinos Charalambidis each scoring two goals and Alexandros Garpozis finishing off the match. Just one month later, on 15 November 2006, they caused another surprise by holding the previous World Cup's hosts Germany to a 1–1 draw at home. On 13 October 2007, they beat Wales 3–1 in Nicosia. On 17 October 2007, Cyprus came close to a historic away victory in Dublin against the Republic of Ireland, but the hosts equalised in the last minute of the game and the match ended 1–1.

=== 2010s ===
On 3 September 2010, as part of the Euro 2012 qualifiers, Cyprus claimed a historic 4–4 draw against Portugal in Guimarães.

During the Euro 2016 qualification phase, managed by Pambos Christodoulou, Cyprus claimed one of their most historic victories by defeating 2014 World Cup participant Bosnia 2–1 in Zenica. In the last group match, the team faced Bosnia, needing a victory to finish 3rd and rely on Belgium to beat Israel in Brussels. As fate would have it, the Bosnians won the reverse leg 3–2 and qualified to the play-offs at the expense of the home team, who at one point took a 2–1 lead during the first half and for a number of minutes held onto 3rd place and a berth in the play-offs for the first time in history, as Belgium, a soon to be world number 1 side, were comfortably beating Israel at home.

Cyprus would finish behind Estonia and ahead of Gibraltar to place 5th of 6 teams in Group H in the 2018 FIFA World Cup qualifiers. Their qualification run would include an impressive 3–2 home victory over Bosnia.

=== 2020s ===
In the Euro 2020 qualifiers, Cyprus beat San Marino 5–0 but lost to Belgium and Scotland. Despite a 2–1 away win against Kazakhstan, they lost their last three games and finished 4th out of 6 teams in the group, just ahead of Kazakhstan and San Marino.

The 2020–21 UEFA Nations League ended a big disappointment for Cyprus. They lost their first three games against Montenegro, Azerbaijan, and Luxembourg, before drawing 0–0 with Azerbaijan in the fourth game. Even though they beat Luxembourg 2–1 at home, they were crushed 4–0 by Montenegro in the last game and finished last in their group. This meant that they had to face Estonia in the relegation play-offs, whom they defeated 2–0 on aggregate, with goals from Marinos Tzionis and Pieros Sotiriou. Results hardly improved in the next edition of the competition, as Cyprus finished last in their group with Greece, Kosovo, and Northern Ireland, earning five points (through a win against Greece and two draws against Northern Ireland).

Cyprus lost all eight of their games in the 2024 Euro qualifiers, finishing last in their group and marking their worst ever Euro qualification campaign in terms of points per game and goal difference.

== Kit ==
On 7 October 2006, Diadora unveiled Cyprus' new kit. It outlines a map of Cyprus in amber from the shoulder to the sleeve, with a green line running down the middle to indicate the division of the island. This controversial kit was used for the UEFA Euro 2008 qualifying phase. Adidas then made Cyprus' kits for the 2010 FIFA World Cup qualification, the UEFA Euro 2012 qualifying, and the 2014 FIFA World Cup qualification phases. In 2018, Macron replaced Adidas as part of UEFA's Kit Assistance Scheme.

Kit provider	Period
None	1949–1986
(Italy) Lotto	1986–1993
(Germany) Adidas	1993
(Italy) Simod	1994–1996
(Italy) Lotto	1997–2000
(Italy) Errea	2000–2002
(England) Umbro	2002–2006
(Italy) Diadora	2006–2008
(Germany) Adidas	2008–2018
(Italy) Macron	2018–2022
(Italy) Errea	2022–2026
(Germany) Adidas	2026–

== Home stadium ==
From late 2021 until early 2026, Cyprus played most of their home matches at the Georgios Karapatakis AEK Arena in Larnaca.

Home matches had previously been staged at different stadiums all around the country. Until 1974, Cyprus used either the old GSP Stadium in central Nicosia or the GSE Stadium in Famagusta. After the Turkish invasion of Cyprus, some matches were played at the Tsirion Stadium in Limassol and the Makario Stadium in Nicosia. In 1999, the building of the New GSP Stadium in Nicosia provided a new home for the national team but in 2008, a change of sponsorship forced home fixtures of the 2010 FIFA World Cup qualification phase to be played at the Antonis Papadopoulos Stadium in Larnaca. However, Cyprus returned to the GSP Stadium for the UEFA Euro 2012 qualifying phase, but again stopped playing there from 2021-2025, but have gone back to playing most matches there, including most of their 2026–27 UEFA Nations League campaign. They also occasionally play at Alphamega Stadium in Limassol.

== Results and fixtures ==
The following is a list of match results in the last 12 months, as well as any future matches that have been scheduled.

Win Draw Loss Fixture

=== 2026 ===
26 March 2026 Friendly	Cyprus	0–1	Belarus	Nicosia, Cyprus
19:00 (UTC+2)		Report	Tikhomirov 25'	Stadium: GSP Stadium; Attendance: 500; Referee: Miloš Milanović (Serbia)

30 March 2026 Friendly	Cyprus	3–2	Moldova	Nicosia, Cyprus
19:00 (UTC+3)	Kastanos 5'; Charalampous 30', 44'	Report	P. Popescu 55'; Stînă 88'	Stadium: GSP Stadium; Referee: Marian Barbu (Romania)

4 June 2026 Friendly	Slovenia	1–1	Cyprus	Ljubljana, Slovenia
18:00 (UTC+2)	Drkušić 65'	Report	Tzionis 7'	Stadium: Stožice Stadium; Attendance: 9,023; Referee: Patrik Kolarić (Croatia)

7 June 2026 Friendly	Liechtenstein	0–2	Cyprus	Vaduz, Liechtenstein
15:00 (UTC+2)		Report	Tzionis 28'; Sotiriou 70'	Stadium: Rheinpark Stadion; Attendance: 878; Referee: Anojen Kanagasingam (Switzerland)

25 September 2026 2026–27 Nations League	Montenegro	2–1	Cyprus	Podgorica, Montenegro
20:45 UTC+2	Krstović 66' (pen.); Osmajić 86'	Report	Edwards 55'	Stadium: Podgorica City Stadium; Attendance: 6,726; Referee: Daniele Chiffi (Italy)

28 September 2026 2026–27 Nations League	Latvia	0–0	Cyprus	Riga, Latvia
20:45 UTC+2		Report		Stadium: Skonto Stadium; Attendance: 6,069; Referee: Michal Očenáš (Slovakia)

2 October 2026 2026–27 Nations League	Cyprus	2–0	Armenia	Nicosia, Cyprus
21:45 UTC+3	Konomis 19'; Kakoullis 31'	Report		Stadium: GSP Stadium; Attendance: 3,456; Referee: Mohammad Al-Emara (Finland)

5 October 2026 2026–27 Nations League	Cyprus	2–1	Latvia	Nicosia, Cyprus
21:45 UTC+3	Kosti 70'; Edwards 90+4'	Report	Dašķevičs 57'	Stadium: GSP Stadium; Attendance: 2,354; Referee: Giorgi Kruashvili (Georgia)

12 November 2026 2026–27 Nations League	Armenia	1–1	Cyprus	Yerevan, Armenia
21:00 UTC+4	Garibyan 58'	Report	Pikis 9'	Stadium: Vazgen Sargsyan Republican Stadium; Attendance: 7,000; Referee: Orel Grinfeld (Israel)

15 November 2026 2026–27 Nations League	Cyprus	1–4	Montenegro	Limassol, Cyprus
16:00 UTC+2	Pittas 52' (pen.)	Report	Osmajić 5'; Vukotić 58'; Krstović 67', 83'	Stadium: Alphamega Stadium; Attendance: 5,695; Referee: Sander van der Eijk (Netherlands)

== Coaching staff ==
Manager	(Greece) Akis Mantzios
Assistant Manager	(Greece) Pavlos Sokratidis
Assistant Manager	(Cyprus) Panagiotis Engomitis
Goalkeeping Coach	(Cyprus) Nicos Constantinidis
Physical Trainer	(Cyprus) Panicos Sakki
Physical Trainer	(Cyprus) Ioakim Ioakim
Match Analyst	(Cyprus) Giorgos Christodoulou

=== Coaching history ===
As of 7 Oct 2024.

- (Greece) Argyrios Gavalas (1960–1967)
- (Cyprus) Pambos Avraamidis (1968–1969)
- (England) Ray Wood (1970–1971)
- (Socialist Federal Republic of Yugoslavia) Sima Milovanov (1972)
- (Cyprus) Pambos Avraamidis (1972–1974)
- (Cyprus) Panikos Iakovou (1974)
- (Cyprus) Pambos Avraamidis (1975)
- (Cyprus) Kostas Talianos (1976)
- (Cyprus) Panikos Krystallis (1976–1977)
- (Cyprus) Andreas Lazarides (1977)
- (Cyprus) Kostas Talianos (1978–1982)
- (Bulgaria) Vasil Spasov (1982–1984)
- (Cyprus) Panikos Iakovou (1984–1987)
- (Cyprus) Takis Charalambous (1987)
- (Cyprus) Panikos Iakovou (1988–1991)
- (Cyprus) Andreas Michaelides (1991–1996)
- (Cyprus) Stavros Papadopoulos (1997)
- (Cyprus) Panikos Georgiou (1997–1999)
- (Cyprus) Stavros Papadopoulos (1999–2001)
- (Cyprus) Takis Charalambous (2001)
- (Serbia and Montenegro) Momčilo Vukotić (2001–2004)
- (Greece) Angelos Anastasiadis (2005–2011)
- (Greece) Nikos Nioplias (2011–2013)
- (Cyprus) Pambos Christodoulou (2014–2015)
- (Cyprus) Christakis Christoforou (2015–2017)
- (Israel) Ran Ben Shimon (2017–2020)
- (Belgium) Johan Walem (2020–2021)
- (Greece) Nikos Kostenoglou (2021–2022)
- (Georgia (country)) Temur Ketsbaia (2022–2024)
- (Cyprus) Sofronis Avgousti (2024)
- (Greece) Akis Mantzios (2025–)

== Players ==
=== Current squad ===
The following players were called up for the 2026–27 UEFA Nations League games against Armenia on 12 November and Montenegro on 15 November 2026.

Caps and goals updated as of 15 November 2026, after the match against Montenegro.

No.	Pos.	Player	Date of birth (age)	Caps	Goals	Club
	GK	Joël Mall	5 April 1991 (age 35)	20	0	(Swiss Football Association) Young Boys
	GK	Fabiano	29 February 1988 (age 38)	10	0	(Cyprus Football Association) Omonia
	GK	Andreas Paraskevas	15 September 1998 (age 28)	2	0	(Cyprus Football Association) AEK Larnaca
	DF	Konstantinos Laifis	19 May 1993 (age 33)	73	5	(Cyprus Football Association) APOEL
	DF	Nikolas Panagiotou	12 May 2000 (age 26)	26	0	(Royal Dutch Football Association) Utrecht
	DF	Kostas Pileas	11 December 1998 (age 27)	19	1	(Cyprus Football Association) AEK Larnaca
	DF	Giorgos Malekkidis	14 July 1997 (age 29)	17	0	(Cyprus Football Association) Apollon Limassol
	DF	Andreas Shikkis	13 January 2002 (age 24)	12	0	(Cyprus Football Association) Apollon Limassol
	DF	Leonidas Konomis	13 June 2001 (age 25)	5	1	(Cyprus Football Association) Apollon Limassol
	DF	Nick Tsaroulla	29 April 1999 (age 27)	3	0	(The Football Association) Notts County
	DF	Evagoras Antoniou	4 November 2002 (age 24)	2	0	(Cyprus Football Association) AEL Limassol
	MF	Grigoris Kastanos	30 January 1998 (age 28)	86	9	(Italian Football Federation) Hellas Verona
	MF	Kostakis Artymatas	15 April 1993 (age 33)	85	1	(Cyprus Football Association) Anorthosis Famagusta
	MF	Charalampos Kyriakou	20 February 1995 (age 31)	79	0	(Cyprus Football Association) AEK Larnaca
	MF	Charalampos Charalampous	4 April 2002 (age 24)	33	4	(Cyprus Football Association) Aris Limassol
	MF	Ioannis Kosti	17 March 2000 (age 26)	25	1	(Hellenic Football Federation) Levadiakos
	MF	Hector Kyprianou	27 May 2001 (age 25)	17	0	(The Football Association) Watford
	MF	Panagiotis Andreou	29 April 2006 (age 20)	5	0	(Cyprus Football Association) Omonia
	MF	Morgan Brown	29 November 1999 (age 26)	1	0	(Cyprus Football Association) Apollon Limassol
	FW	Ioannis Pittas	10 July 1996 (age 30)	64	12	(Bulgarian Football Union) CSKA Sofia
	FW	Loizos Loizou	18 July 2003 (age 23)	52	3	(Football Association of Serbia) Red Star Belgrade
	FW	Marinos Tzionis	16 July 2001 (age 25)	46	5	(Romanian Football Federation) UTA Arad
	FW	Andronikos Kakoullis	3 May 2001 (age 25)	41	8	(Cyprus Football Association) Omonia
	FW	Stavros Georgiou	19 October 2004 (age 22)	8	0	(Cyprus Football Association) APOEL
	FW	Angelos Neophytou	23 May 2005 (age 21)	7	0	(Cyprus Football Association) Omonia
	FW	Marcus Edwards	3 December 1998 (age 27)	6	2	(The Football Association) Burnley
	FW	Iasonas Pikis	11 November 2000 (age 26)	2	1	(Football Federation of Armenia) Pyunik
	FW	Zanos Savva	26 November 2005 (age 20)	1	0	(Cyprus Football Association) Olympiakos Nicosia

=== Recent call-ups ===
The following players have also been called up to the Cyprus squad within the last 12 months and are still available for selection.

Pos.	Player	Date of birth (age)	Caps	Goals	Club	Latest call-up
GK	Neofytos Michail	16 December 1993 (age 32)	17	0	(Romania) Universitatea Cluj	v. Latvia, 5 October 2026
GK	Charalampos Kyriakidis	30 November 1998 (age 27)	5	0	(Cyprus) Pafos	v.Liechtenstein, 7 June 2026
GK	Panayiotis Kyriakou	5 May 2004 (age 22)	0	0	(Cyprus) AEL Limassol	v. Moldova, 30 March 2026
DF	Christos Sielis	2 February 2000 (age 26)	15	0	(Greece) OFI	v. Latvia, 5 October 2026
DF	Konstantinos Sotiriou	21 June 1996 (age 30)	13	2	(Poland) Korona Kielce	v. Latvia, 5 October 2026
DF	Stelios Andreou	24 July 2002 (age 24)	30	1	(Poland) Widzew Łódź	v.Liechtenstein, 7 June 2026
DF	Anderson Correia	6 May 1991 (age 35)	21	0	(Cyprus) Aris Limassol	v.Liechtenstein, 7 June 2026
DF	Konstantinos Sergiou	2 October 2000 (age 26)	1	0	(Cyprus) Nea Salamina	v.Liechtenstein, 7 June 2026
MF	Andreas Christou	5 August 2005 (age 21)	2	0	(Cyprus) Omonia	v. Latvia, 5 October 2026
MF	Giannis Satsias	28 December 2002 (age 23)	14	1	(Greece) Panetolikos	v.Liechtenstein, 7 June 2026
MF	Giorgos Naoum	21 April 2001 (age 25)	2	0	(Cyprus) AEK Larnaca	v.Liechtenstein, 7 June 2026
MF	Ioannis Kousoulos	14 June 1996 (age 30)	50	4	(Greece) Kifisia	v. Moldova, 30 March 2026
FW	Nikolas Koutsakos	14 November 2003 (age 23)	9	1	(Cyprus) APOEL	v. Moldova, 30 March 2026
FW	Evangelos Andreou	24 September 2002 (age 24)	3	1	(Cyprus) Omonia	v. Moldova, 30 March 2026
^{INJ} Player withdrew from the squad due to an injury.; ^{PRE} Preliminary squad.; ^{RET} Retired from international football.; ^{SUS} Suspended

== Player records ==
As of 15 November 2026
Players in bold are still active with Cyprus.

=== Most appearances ===
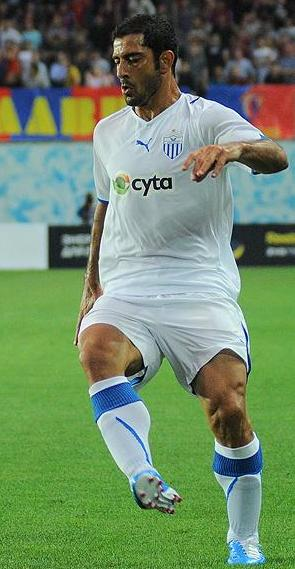
Ioannis Okkas is Cyprus' most capped player with 103 appearances.

Rank	Player	Caps	Goals	Career
1	Ioannis Okkas	103	27	1997–2011
2	Constantinos Charalambidis	93	12	2003–2017
3	**Grigoris Kastanos**	86	9	2015–present
4	**Kostakis Artymatas**	85	1	2012–present
5	Michalis Konstantinou	84	32	1997–2012
6	Pambos Pittas	82	7	1987–1999
7	**Charalampos Kyriakou**	79	0	2014–present
8	Constantinos Makrides	77	5	2004–2016
9	Nicos Panayiotou	74	0	1994–2006
10	**Konstantinos Laifis**	73	5	2014–

=== Top goalscorers ===
Rank	Player	Goals	Caps	Ratio	Career
1	Michalis Konstantinou	32	84	0.38	1997–2012
2	Ioannis Okkas	27	103	0.26	1997–2011
3	**Ioannis Pittas**	12	64	0.19	2019–present
3	**Pieros Sotiriou**	12	67	0.18	2012–present
3	Constantinos Charalambidis	12	93	0.13	2003–2017
6	Efstathios Aloneftis	10	62	0.11	2005–2017
7	Marios Agathokleous	9	38	0.24	1994–2003
7	Demetris Christofi	9	72	0.13	2008–2023
7	**Grigoris Kastanos**	9	86	0.1	2015–present
10	Fivos Vrahimis	8	18	0.44	1977–1982
10	Milenko Špoljarić	8	21	0.38	1997–2001
10	Siniša Gogić	8	37	0.22	1994–1999
10	Andreas Sotiriou	8	39	0.21	1991–1999
10	**Andronikos Kakoullis**	8	41	0.2	2020–present

== Competitive record ==
=== All-time record ===
As of 12 November 2026

Competition	Played	Won	Draw	Lost	GF	GA
FIFA World Cup qualification	132	18	17	97	102	331
European Championship qualification	122	19	15	88	101	316
Friendly matches	143	40	36	67	157	216
UEFA Nations League	31	8	8	15	23	50
Total	428	85	76	267	384	913

=== FIFA World Cup ===
FIFA World Cup record									Qualification record					
Year	Result	Position	Pld	W	D*	L	GF	GA	Pld	W	D	L	GF	GA
(Uruguay) 1930	Not a FIFA member								Not a FIFA member					
(Italy) 1934	Not a FIFA member								Not a FIFA member					
(France) 1938	Not a FIFA member								Not a FIFA member					
(Brazil) 1950	Did not enter								Did not enter					
(Switzerland) 1954	Did not enter								Did not enter					
(Sweden) 1958	Withdrew								Withdrew					
(Chile) 1962	Did not qualify								2	0	1	1	2	7
(England) 1966	Did not qualify								4	0	0	4	0	19
(Mexico) 1970	Did not qualify								6	0	0	6	2	35
(West Germany) 1974	Did not qualify								6	1	0	5	1	14
(Argentina) 1978	Did not qualify								6	0	0	6	3	24
(Spain) 1982	Did not qualify								8	0	0	8	4	29
(Mexico) 1986	Did not qualify								6	0	0	6	3	18
(Italy) 1990	Did not qualify								8	0	1	7	6	20
(United States) 1994	Did not qualify								10	2	1	7	8	18
(France) 1998	Did not qualify								8	3	1	4	10	15
(South Korea) (Japan) 2002	Did not qualify								10	2	2	6	13	31
(Germany) 2006	Did not qualify								10	1	1	8	8	20
(South Africa) 2010	Did not qualify								10	2	3	5	14	16
(Brazil) 2014	Did not qualify								10	1	2	7	4	15
(Russia) 2018	Did not qualify								10	3	1	6	9	18
(Qatar) 2022	Did not qualify								10	1	2	7	4	21
(Canada) (Mexico) (United States) 2026	Did not qualify								8	2	2	4	11	11
(Morocco) (Portugal) (Spain) (Argentina) (Paraguay) (Uruguay) 2030	To be determined								To be determined					
(Saudi Arabia) 2034	To be determined								To be determined					
Total		0/20							132	18	17	97	102	331

=== UEFA European Championship ===
UEFA European Championship record									Qualifying record					
Year	Result	Position	Pld	W	D	L	GF	GA	Pld	W	D	L	GF	GA
(France) 1960	Not a UEFA member								Not a UEFA member					
(Spain) 1964	Did not enter								Did not enter					
(Italy) 1968	Did not qualify								6	1	0	5	3	25
(Belgium) 1972	Did not qualify								6	0	0	6	2	26
(Socialist Federal Republic of Yugoslavia) 1976	Did not qualify								6	0	0	6	0	16
(Italy) 1980	Did not qualify								6	0	1	5	2	19
(France) 1984	Did not qualify								8	0	2	6	4	21
(West Germany) 1988	Did not qualify								8	0	1	7	3	16
(Sweden) 1992	Did not qualify								8	0	0	8	2	25
(England) 1996	Did not qualify								10	1	4	5	6	20
(Belgium) (Netherlands) 2000	Did not qualify								8	4	0	4	12	21
(Portugal) 2004	Did not qualify								8	2	2	4	9	18
(Austria) (Switzerland) 2008	Did not qualify								12	4	2	6	17	24
(Poland) (Ukraine) 2012	Did not qualify								8	0	2	6	7	20
(France) 2016	Did not qualify								10	4	0	6	16	17
(European Union) 2020	Did not qualify								10	3	1	6	15	20
(Germany) 2024	Did not qualify								8	0	0	8	3	28
(England) (Scotland) (Republic of Ireland) (Wales) 2028	To be determined								To be determined					
(Italy) (Turkey) 2032	To be determined								To be determined					
Total		0/18							122	19	15	88	101	316

=== UEFA Nations League ===
UEFA Nations League record
Season	Division	Group	Pld	W	D	L	GF	GA	P/R	Rank
2018–19	C	3	6	1	2	3	5	9	Same position	36th
2020–21	C	1	8	2	2	4	4	10	Same position	46th
2022–23	C	2	6	1	2	3	4	12	Same position	45th
2024–25	C	2	6	2	0	4	4	15	Same position	43rd
2026–27	C	2	6	2	2	2	7	8	TBD	40th
2026–27	C	Promotion play-off	0	0	0	0	0	0	TBD	40th
Total			31	8	8	15	23	50	36th	

== Head-to-head record ==
As of 12 November 2026.

Positive record Neutral record Negative record

Opponent	P	W	D	L
Albania	6	2	2	2
Andorra	5	5	0	0
Armenia	9	5	3	1
Austria	9	0	1	8
Azerbaijan	2	0	1	1
Belarus	3	1	0	2
Belgium	13	0	1	12
Bosnia and Herzegovina	6	2	1	3
Bulgaria	17	1	2	14
Canada	2	0	1	1
Croatia	3	0	0	3
Czech Republic	4	0	0	4
Czechoslovakia	6	0	2	4
Denmark	6	0	1	5
England	2	0	0	2
Estonia	12	5	4	3
Faroe Islands	4	3	1	0
Finland	4	1	1	2
France	8	0	1	7
Georgia	8	3	1	4
Germany	6	0	1	5
Gibraltar	2	2	0	0
Greece	31	5	6	20
Hungary	8	1	0	7
Iceland	7	1	3	3
Iran	1	0	1	0
Iraq	1	1	0	0
Israel	16	4	3	9
Italy	8	0	1	7
Japan	1	0	0	1
Jordan	5	1	2	2
Kazakhstan	4	3	1	0
Kosovo	4	0	0	4
Kuwait	2	1	1	0
Latvia	5	3	2	0
Lebanon	2	1	0	1
Liechtenstein	1	1	0	0
Lithuania	6	5	0	1
Luxembourg	5	4	0	1
Malta	8	3	3	2
Moldova	3	2	0	1
Montenegro	6	0	3	3
Netherlands	8	0	0	8
North Macedonia	2	0	1	1
Northern Ireland	8	1	4	3
Norway	13	0	0	13
Poland	7	0	3	4
Portugal	11	0	1	10
Republic of Ireland	10	1	1	8
Romania	17	1	4	12
Russia	7	0	1	6
San Marino	9	9	0	0
Saudi Arabia	1	0	1	0
Scotland	9	0	0	9
Serbia	5	0	1	4
Slovakia	6	1	1	4
Slovenia	13	3	4	6
Soviet Union	4	0	0	4
Spain	10	1	0	9
Sweden	6	0	1	5
Switzerland	8	1	2	5
Syria	1	1	0	0
Ukraine	4	1	1	2
Wales	7	2	0	5
Yugoslavia	4	0	0	4
Zambia	3	0	0	3
