= 2020–21 Pafos FC season =

Pafos
2020–21 season
- Owner: Pavel Gognidze
- Manager: Cameron Toshack until 20 October; Dmytro Mykhaylenko; 20 October - 31 January; Stephen Constantine from 4 February
- Stadium: Stelios Kyriakides Stadium
- Cyta Championship: 7th
- Cypriot Cup: Second Round vs Anorthosis Famagusta
- Top goalscorer: League: Two Players (13); All: Onni Valakari (15)
Home colours	Away colours

The 2020–21 season was Pafos's 7th year in existence, and fourth season in the Cypriot First Division.

== Season review ==
=== July ===
On 15 July, Pafos signed Rushian Hepburn-Murphy from Aston Villa.

=== August ===
On 4 August, Pafos signed Josef Kvída from NEC Nijmegen, with Camilo Saiz joining on a season-long loan deal from Independiente Medellín on 6 August.

On 13 August, Will Mannion joined Pafos after being released by Hull City.

On 24 August, Pafos announced the signing of Mukwelle Akale from Villarreal B. with João Aurélio joining Pafos from Moreirense the following day.

=== September ===
On 3 September, Danila Yanov joined Pafos on a season-long loan from Riga.

On 5 September, Orest Kuzyk signed for Pafos from PAS Giannina.

On 9 September, Jack Evans joined Pafos on a season-long loan from Swansea City.

On 13 September, Pafos confirmed the signings of Navarone Foor from Al-Ittihad Kalba, and Marcelo Torres from Boca Juniors after a successful loan stint in the previous season.

On 21 September, Pafos signed Sam Hutchinson on a free transfer from Sheffield Wednesday.

=== October ===
On 20 October, Cameron Toshack's contract as Head Coach of Pafos was terminated by mutual consent, with Dmytro Mykhaylenko being appointed as his replacement on the same day.

=== December ===
On 21 December, Artur Rudko signed a one-year extension to his Pafos contract, keeping him at the club until the summer of 2022. On 24 December, Pafos confirmed that Jack Evans' loan deal had been ended. Four days later, 28 December, the club confirmed that Sam Hutchinson had left Pafos by mutual agreement.

On 28 December, Pafos announced the singing of Stefan Panić from Riga.

=== January ===
On 4 January, Mickaël Panos moved on loan to Enosis Neon Paralimni until the end of the season.

On 28 January, Pafos announced the signing of Víctor Álvarez.

On 31 January, Dmytro Mykhaylenko left his role as Head Coach.

=== February ===
On 4 February, recently appointed Chief of Football Operations Stephen Constantine, became the new Head Coach of Pafos, with Míchel Salgado becoming taking the role previously held by Constantine on 5 February.

On 14 February, Pafos announced that Brayan Angulo had left the club by mutual agreement.

=== March ===
On 10 March, Danila Yanov's loan with Pafos was ended early and he returned to Riga.

=== May ===
At the end of the season, Pafos announced that they had signed new one-year contracts, with the option of an additional year, with Jason Puncheon and Kévin Bérigaud.

== Transfers ==
=== In ===
Date	Position	Nationality	Name	From	Fee	Ref.
15 July 2020	FW	(England)	Rushian Hepburn-Murphy	Aston Villa	Undisclosed	
4 August 2020	DF	(Czech Republic)	Josef Kvída	NEC Nijmegen	Undisclosed	
13 August 2020	GK	(England)	Will Mannion	Hull City	Free	
24 August 2020	MF	(United States)	Mukwelle Akale	Villarreal B	Undisclosed	
25 August 2020	DF	(Portugal)	João Aurélio	Moreirense	Undisclosed	
5 September 2020	MF	(Ukraine)	Orest Kuzyk	PAS Giannina	Undisclosed	
13 September 2020	MF	(Netherlands)	Navarone Foor	Al-Ittihad Kalba	Undisclosed	
13 September 2020	FW	(Argentina)	Marcelo Torres	Boca Juniors	Undisclosed	
21 September 2020	DF	(England)	Sam Hutchinson	Sheffield Wednesday	Free	
28 December 2020	MF	(Serbia)	Stefan Panić	Riga	Undisclosed	
28 January 2021	DF	(Spain)	Víctor Álvarez	Unattached	Free	

=== Loans in ===
Start date	Position	Nationality	Name	From	End date	Ref.
4 September 2019	DF	(Uruguay)	Joaquín Varela	Fénix	3 April 2021	
6 August 2020	DF	(Colombia)	Camilo Saiz	Independiente Medellín	End of season	
3 September 2020	MF	(Russia)	Danila Yanov	Riga	10 March 2021	
9 September 2020	MF	(Wales)	Jack Evans	Swansea City	24 December 2020	

=== Loans out ===
Start date	Position	Nationality	Name	To	End date	Ref.
4 January 2021	DF	(France)	Mickaël Panos	Enosis Neon Paralimni	End of Season	

=== Released ===
Date	Position	Nationality	Name	Joined	Date	Ref
28 December 2020	DF	(England)	Sam Hutchinson	Sheffield Wednesday	25 January 2021	
14 February 2021	MF	(Colombia)	Brayan Angulo	Once Caldas		
30 June 2021	DF	(Finland)	Paulus Arajuuri	Anorthosis Famagusta	1 July 2021	
30 June 2021	DF	(France)	Mickaël Panos	Vllaznia Shkodër		
30 June 2021	DF	(Greece)	Giorgos Valerianos	Ionikos	1 July 2021	
30 June 2021	DF	(Russia)	Pavel Lelyukhin	Yessentuki		
30 June 2021	DF	(Spain)	Víctor Álvarez	Deinze	17 August 2023	
30 June 2021	MF	(United States)	Mukwelle Akale	South Georgia Tormenta	25 August 2022	
30 June 2021	MF	(Ukraine)	Orest Kuzyk	Rukh Lviv	1 July 2021	
30 June 2021	FW	(Cape Verde)	Jerson Cabral	Ionikos	10 July 2021	
30 June 2021	FW	(Latvia)	Deniss Rakels	RFS	2 July 2021	

== Squad ==
As of match played 29 May 2021

No.	Name	Nationality	Position	Date of birth (age)	Signed from	Signed in	Contract ends	Apps.	Goals
Goalkeepers
1	Artur Rudko	(Ukraine)	GK	7 May 1992 (aged 29)	Dynamo Kyiv	2019	2022	62	0
12	Evgenios Petrou	(Cyprus)	GK	6 September 1997 (aged 23)	Ethnikos Assia	2018		10	0
25	Will Mannion	(England)	GK	5 May 1998 (aged 23)	Hull City	2020		1	0
88	Andreas Theokli	(Cyprus)	GK	23 July 2001 (aged 19)	Academy	2019		0	0
Defenders
2	Camilo Saiz	(Colombia)	DF	1 March 1991 (aged 30)	loan from Independiente Medellín	2020	2021	38	3
4	Josef Kvída	(Czech Republic)	DF	16 January 1997 (aged 24)	NEC Nijmegen	2020		28	1
5	Kyriakos Antoniou	(Cyprus)	DF	3 May 2001 (aged 20)	Academy	2018		30	2
15	Giorgos Valerianos	(Greece)	DF	13 February 1992 (aged 29)	Aris Thessaloniki	2019		35	0
20	João Aurélio	(Portugal)	DF	17 August 1988 (aged 32)	Moreirense	2020		39	1
23	Paulus Arajuuri (Captain)	(Finland)	DF	15 June 1988 (aged 32)	Brøndby	2019		49	2
27	Víctor Álvarez	(Spain)	DF	14 March 1993 (aged 28)	Unattached	2021		4	0
66	Pavel Lelyukhin	(Russia)	DF	23 April 1998 (aged 23)	Dynamo Moscow	2018		31	0
Midfielders
8	Mukwelle Akale	(United States)	MF	18 January 1997 (aged 24)	Villarreal B	2020		8	0
17	Orest Kuzyk	(Ukraine)	MF	17 May 1995 (aged 26)	PAS Giannina	2020		13	1
19	Navarone Foor	(Netherlands)	MF	4 February 1992 (aged 29)	Al-Ittihad Kalba	2020		36	1
21	Gerasimos Fylaktou	(Cyprus)	MF	24 July 1991 (aged 29)	Ermis Aradippou	2019	2021		
24	Onni Valakari	(Finland)	MF	18 August 1999 (aged 21)	Tromsø	2020		44	20
28	Stefan Panić	(Serbia)	MF	20 September 1992 (aged 28)	Riga	2020		22	1
42	Jason Puncheon (Vice-captain)	(England)	MF	18 June 1986 (aged 34)	Crystal Palace	2019	2022	47	4
73	Manolis Charalambous	(Cyprus)	MF	1 April 2003 (aged 18)	Academy	2020		0	0
86	Alexandros Spontas	(Cyprus)	MF	27 November 2002 (aged 18)	Academy	2020		4	0
Forwards
7	Vá	(Angola)	FW	24 April 1998 (aged 23)	Petro de Luanda	2019		43	7
9	Kévin Bérigaud	(France)	FW	9 May 1988 (aged 33)	Montpellier	2018	2022		
10	Marcelo Torres	(Argentina)	FW	6 November 1997 (aged 23)	Boca Juniors	2020		36	9
11	Rushian Hepburn-Murphy	(England)	FW	28 August 1998 (aged 22)	Aston Villa	2020		23	5
26	Jerson Cabral	(Cape Verde)	FW	3 January 1991 (aged 30)	Levski Sofia	2019		31	4
33	Lysandros Papastylianou	(Cyprus)	FW	29 November 2005 (aged 15)	Academy	2021		1	0
58	Pavlos Charidimou	(Cyprus)	FW	14 September 2001 (aged 19)	Academy	2020		0	0
92	Deniss Rakels	(Latvia)	FW	20 August 1992 (aged 28)	Reading	2018		56	3
Out on loan
18	Mickaël Panos	(France)	DF	10 February 1997 (aged 24)	Saint-Étienne	2019		27	0
Left during the season
3	Joaquín Varela	(Uruguay)	DF	27 June 1998 (aged 22)	loan from Fénix	2019	2021	9	0
6	Sam Hutchinson	(England)	DF	3 August 1989 (aged 31)	Sheffield Wednesday	2020		6	0
13	Danila Yanov	(Russia)	MF	27 January 2000 (aged 21)	loan from Riga	2020	2021	4	0
34	Jack Evans	(Wales)	MF	25 April 1998 (aged 23)	loan from Swansea City	2020	2020	3	0
70	Brayan Angulo	(Colombia)	MF	19 July 1993 (aged 27)	Independiente Medellín	2020		50	11

=== Out on loan ===
Note: Flags indicate national team as defined under FIFA eligibility rules; some limited exceptions apply. Players may hold more than one non-FIFA nationality.

No.	Pos.	Nation	Player
18	DF	FRA	Mickaël Panos (at Enosis Neon Paralimni)

=== Left club during season ===
Note: Flags indicate national team as defined under FIFA eligibility rules; some limited exceptions apply. Players may hold more than one non-FIFA nationality.

No.	Pos.	Nation	Player
3	DF	URU	Joaquín Varela (loan return to Fénix)
6	DF	ENG	Sam Hutchinson
13	MF	RUS	Danila Yanov (loan return to Riga)
34	MF	WAL	Jack Evans (loan return to Swansea City)
70	MF	COL	Brayan Angulo

== Friendlies ==
	v
EEST (UTC+3)

== Competitions ==
=== Overview ===
Competition	First match	Last match	Starting round	Final position	Record							
Competition	First match	Last match	Starting round	Final position	Pld	W	D	L	GF	GA	GD	Win %
Cyta Championship	22 August 2020	May 2021	Matchday 1		40	18	9	13	58	38	+20	45.00
Cypriot Cup	16 September 2020	4 November 2020	First round	Second Round	2	1	0	1	5	2	+3	50.00
Total					42	19	9	14	63	40	+23	45.24

Last updated: 29 May 2021
Source: Competitions

=== Cyta Championship ===
==== Regular season ====
===== League table =====
Pos	Team	Pld	W	D	L	GF	GA	GD	Pts	Qualification or relegation
5	AEK Larnaca	26	12	5	9	36	25	+11	41	Qualification for the Championship round
6	Olympiakos Nicosia	26	10	4	12	27	38	−11	34	Qualification for the Championship round
7	Pafos FC	26	8	8	10	30	27	+3	32	Qualification for the Relegation round
8	APOEL	26	8	6	12	27	31	−4	30 (Note: Head-to-head goal difference: APOEL +1, Doxa -1)	Qualification for the Relegation round
9	Doxa Katokopias	26	7	9	10	24	32	−8	30	Qualification for the Relegation round

Source: Cyprus Football Association
Rules for classification: 1) Points; 2) Head-to-head points; 3) Head-to-head goal difference; 4) Head-to-head goals scored; 5) Head-to-head away goals scored (only if two teams); 6) Goal difference; 7) Goals scored; 8) Play-off (only if deciding championship round, relegation round or relegation).

===== Results summary =====
Overall								Home						Away					
Pld	W	D	L	GF	GA	GD	Pts	W	D	L	GF	GA	GD	W	D	L	GF	GA	GD
26	8	8	10	30	27	+3	32	7	3	3	25	15	+10	1	5	7	5	12	−7

Last updated: 22 February 2021.
Source: Results

===== Results by results =====
Matchday	1	2	3	4	5	6	7	8	9	10	11	12	13	14	15	16	17	18	19	20	21	22	23	24	25	26
Ground	H	H	A	H	A	H	A	H	H	A	H	A	A	A	A	H	A	H	A	H	A	H	A	H	A	H
Result	D	L	L	D	L	W	W	W	W	D	W	D	D	L	L	D	L	W	L	L	D	L	L	W	D	W
Position	8	10	13	12	13	7	7	7	8	7	7	6	7	7	7	7	7	6	7	7	8	8	9	7	9	7

Updated to match(es) played on 22 February 2021. Source: Results
A = Away; H = Home; W = Win; D = Draw; L = Loss; P = Postponed

===== Results =====
22 August 2020 1	Pafos	2–2	Omonoia Nicosia	Paphos
18:30 EEST (UTC+3)	Bérigaud 14' (pen.) (yellow card) 27'; Antoniou (yellow card) 48'; Valerianos (yellow card) 63'; Hepburn-Murphy (yellow card) 70'; Puncheon 79'	Report	Tzionis (yellow card) 51'; Bauthéac 56', 64' (pen.); Kiko (yellow card) 90+3'	Stadium: Stelios Kyriakides Stadium; Referee: Loukas Soteriou

28 August 2020 2	Pafos	0–1	Anorthosis Famagusta	Paphos
18:30 EEST (UTC+3)	Puncheon (yellow card) 6'; Saiz (yellow card) 21'; Kvída (yellow card) 90+3'	Report	Okriashvili (yellow card) 45+2' (goal) 90' (pen.); Loria (yellow card) 90+3'	Stadium: Stelios Kyriakides Stadium; Referee: Giorgos Nikolaou

12 September 2020 3	Apollon Limassol	1–0	Pafos	Limassol
19:30 EEST (UTC+3)	Denić 56'; Gianniotas (yellow card) 73'; Sachetti (yellow card) 76'	Report	Valerianos (yellow card) 47'; Hepburn-Murphy (yellow card) 50'	Stadium: Tsirio Stadium; Referee: Chrysovalantis Theouli

19 September 2020 4	Pafos	2–2	Ethnikos Achna	Paphos
18:30 EEST (UTC+3)	Puncheon (yellow card) 15'; Saiz 36' (yellow card) 53'; Kvída (yellow card) 49'; Vá 68'	Report	Elia (yellow card) 17'; Doležal 45'; Papageorgiou (yellow card) 50'; Khudobyak 76' (pen.); Deyvison (yellow card) 90+1'	Stadium: Stelios Kyriakides Stadium; Referee: Loukas Soteriou

28 September 2020 5	Olympiakos Nicosia	2–1	Pafos	Nicosia
19:00 EEST (UTC+3)	Garoufalias (yellow card) 5'; Mantzis (yellow card) 45+2' (goal) 60'; Gustavo 76'; Andreou (yellow card) 87'	Report	Valerianos (yellow card) 42'; Hutchinson (yellow card) 64'; Valakari 90+4'	Stadium: Makario Stadium; Referee: Kyriakos Christodoulou

3 October 2020 6	Pafos	1–0	Nea Salamis Famagusta	Paphos
20:30 EEST (UTC+3)	Vá (yellow card) 59'; Hutchinson (yellow card) 63'; Angulo 71' 80'; Arajuuri (yellow card) 85'	Report	Vinícius (yellow card) 26'; Confais (yellow card) 57'; Breno (yellow card) 82'	Stadium: Stelios Kyriakides Stadium; Referee: Giorgos Nikolaou

18 October 2020 7	APOEL	0–1	Pafos	Strovolos
18:30 EEST (UTC+3)	Sahar 69'; De Vincenti (yellow card) 73'; Anuar (yellow card) 78'	Report	Evans (yellow card) 3'; Hutchinson (red card) 51'; Aurélio (yellow card) 81'; Valakari 84' (pen.)	Stadium: GSP Stadium; Referee: Loukas Soteriou

23 October 2020 8	Pafos	3–0	Karmiotissa	Paphos
18:00 EEST (UTC+3)	Bérigaud 26'; Kuzyk 33'; Vá (yellow card) 49'; Valakari 52'; Puncheon (yellow card) 59'; Arajuuri (yellow card) 64'; Lelyukhin (yellow card) 82'	Report	Kapartis (yellow card) 44'	Stadium: Stelios Kyriakides Stadium; Referee: Kyriakos Christodoulou

7 November 2020 9	Pafos	1–0	AEL Limassol	Paphos
16:00 EET (UTC+2)	Foor 19' (yellow card) 77' (yellow-red card) 79'; Arajuuri (yellow card) 31'; Rudko (yellow card) 90'	Report	Medojević (yellow card) 28'; Torres (yellow card) 65'; Avraam (yellow card) 69'; Bruno Santos (yellow card) 78'	Stadium: Stelios Kyriakides Stadium; Referee: Giorgos Nikolaou

23 November 2020 10	Enosis Neon Paralimni	0–0	Pafos	Paralimni
20:00 EET (UTC+2)	Irep (yellow card) 71'	Report		Stadium: Paralimni Stadium; Referee: Nikolas Neokleous

29 November 2020 11	Pafos	2–0	Doxa Katokopias	Paphos
16:00 EET (UTC+2)	Valakari (yellow card) 16' (goal) 61' (pen.); Torres (yellow card) 28'; Aurélio (yellow card) 32'; Rakels 86'	Report	Trajchevski (yellow card) 11'; Luís Carlos (yellow card) 28' (yellow-red card) 64'; Englezou (red card) 60'	Stadium: Stelios Kyriakides Stadium; Referee: Konstantinos Fellas

6 December 2020 12	Ermis Aradippou	1–1	Pafos	Larnaca
18:30 EET (UTC+2)	Koné (yellow card) 8'; Holt (yellow card) 16'; Kyriakidis (yellow card) 32'; Demetriou (yellow card) 35'; Roushias 73'	Report	Valakari 2' (yellow card) 16' (yellow-red card) 30'; Kvída (yellow card) 38'; Arajuuri (yellow card) 45+1'; Angulo (yellow card) 70'	Stadium: Ammochostos Stadium; Referee: Chrysovalantis Theouli

9 December 2020 13	AEK Larnaca	0–0	Pafos	Larnaca
17:00 EET (UTC+2)	Ioannou (yellow card) 70'; Spirovski (yellow card) 88'	Report	Vá (yellow card) 14'; Puncheon (yellow card) 76'	Stadium: AEK Arena; Referee: Nikolas Neokleous

14 December 2020 14	Omonoia Nicosia	2–1	Pafos	Strovolos
19:00 EET (UTC+2)	Tzionis 13', 78'	Report	Puncheon 45+1'; Foor (yellow card) 80'	Stadium: GSP Stadium; Referee: Vasilis Demetriou

18 December 2020 15	Anorthosis Famagusta	1–0	Pafos	Larnaca
16:00 EET (UTC+2)	Correia (yellow card) 55'; Margaça 65' (yellow card) 72'; Christofi (yellow card) 85'; Pileas (yellow card) 90+3'	Report	Kvída (yellow card) 45'	Stadium: Antonis Papadopoulos Stadium; Referee: Giorgos Nikolaou

23 December 2020 16	Pafos	1–1	Apollon Limassol	Paphos
16:00 EET (UTC+2)	Foor (yellow card) 7'; Puncheon 89'; Antoniou (yellow card) 90+2'	Report	Marković (yellow card) 17'; Pittas 36'; Vasiliou (yellow card) 88'	Stadium: Stelios Kyriakides Stadium; Referee: Nikolas Neokleous

3 January 2021 17	Ethnikos Achna	2–1	Pafos	Achna
16:00 EET (UTC+2)	Papageorgiou 11'; Savić (yellow card) 15'; Elia (yellow card) 51'; Elia 68'; Stratilatis (yellow card) 90+2'	Report	Bérigaud (yellow card) 13'; Torres 43'; Saiz (yellow card) 57'	Stadium: Dasaki Stadium; Referee: Kyriakos Christodoulou

7 January 2021 18	Pafos	5–0	Olympiakos Nicosia	Paphos
19:00 EET (UTC+2)	Puncheon (yellow card) 27'; Valakari 33' (pen.), 89'; Torres 36', 61'; Arajuuri (yellow card) 45'; Hepburn-Murphy 77'	Report		Stadium: Stelios Kyriakides Stadium; Referee: Giorgos Nikolaou

11 January 2021 19	Nea Salamis Famagusta	2–0	Pafos	Larnaca
20:00 EET (UTC+2)	Barnes 25'; Kamissoko 30'; Sergiou (yellow card) 35'; Tsoukalas (yellow card) 78'	Report	Lelyukhin (yellow card) 28'; Antoniou (yellow card) 57'	Stadium: Ammochostos Stadium; Referee: Chrysovalantis Theouli

17 January 2021 20	Pafos	2–3	APOEL	Paphos
16:00 EET (UTC+2)	Kvída (yellow card) 30'; Panić 37'; Lelyukhin (yellow card) 42'; Valakari 87' (pen.)	Report	Sahar 31' (pen.); Nsue 48'; Ndongala (yellow card) 59'; Satsias 66'	Stadium: Stelios Kyriakides Stadium; Referee: Vasilis Demetriou

25 January 2021 21	Karmiotissa	0–0	Pafos	Paphos
19:00 EET (UTC+2)	Reynolds (yellow card) 25'; Neofytou (yellow card) 29'; Stylianou (yellow card) 58'	Report	Panić (yellow card) 19'; Aurélio (yellow card) 41'	Stadium: Stelios Kyriakides Stadium; Attendance: 0 Referee: Marios Christoforou

31 January 2021 22	Pafos	1–4	AEK Larnaca	Paphos
16:00 EET (UTC+2)	Yanov (yellow card) 46'; Bérigaud (yellow card) 55'; Valakari 56'	Report	Nando García 26', 64'; Hateley (yellow card) 28'; Mojsov (yellow card) 48'; José Naranjo 85'; Makris 90'	Stadium: Stelios Kyriakides Stadium; Referee: Nikolas Neokleous

7 February 2021 23	AEL Limassol	1–0	Pafos	Limassol
18:30 EET (UTC+2)	Riera (yellow card) 24'; Zdravkovski 47'; Kerkez (yellow card) 79'	Report	Foor (yellow card) 37'; Saiz (yellow card) 40'; Panić (yellow card) 46' (yellow-red card) 65'	Stadium: Tsirio Stadium; Referee: Nikolas Neokleous

11 February 2021 24	Pafos	2–1	Enosis Neon Paralimni	Paphos
19:00 EET (UTC+2)	Valakari 16' (pen.) (yellow card) 84'; Aurélio (yellow card) 42'; Álvarez (yellow card) 51'; Hepburn-Murphy 88'	Report	Ngoo (yellow card) 24'; Barboza (yellow card) 25'; Barny (yellow card) 45+1'; Kosma (yellow card) 49'; Bellone (yellow card) 58'; Dening 79' (pen.); Kotsonis (yellow card) 90+1'	Stadium: Stelios Kyriakides Stadium; Referee: Vasilis Demetriou

16 February 2021 25	Doxa Katokopias	0–0	Pafos	Nicosia
17:00 EET (UTC+2)	Mintikkis (yellow card) 47'; Trajchevski (yellow card) 90+1'	Report	Saiz (yellow card) 80'	Stadium: Makario Stadium; Referee: Chrysovalantis Theouli

22 February 2021 26	Pafos	3–1	Ermis Aradippou	Paphos
19:00 EET (UTC+2)	Saiz 10'; Kvída (yellow card) 29'; Valakari 59' (pen.), 85'; Fylaktou (yellow card) 77'	Report	Roushias 20' (pen.); Valpoort (yellow card) 25'; Karagounis (yellow card) 26'; Kyriakidis (yellow card) 45+1'; Holt (yellow card) 58'	Stadium: Stelios Kyriakides Stadium

==== Relegation round ====
===== League table =====
Pos	Team	Pld	W	D	L	GF	GA	GD	Pts	Relegation
7	Pafos FC	40	18	9	13	58	38	+20	63	
8	APOEL	40	17	9	14	48	39	+9	60	
9	Ethnikos Achna	40	14	10	16	48	56	−8	52	
10	Doxa Katokopias	40	13	12	15	46	43	+3	51	
11	Nea Salamis Famagusta (R)	40	11	10	19	48	61	−13	43	Relegation to Cypriot Second Division
12	Ermis Aradippou (R)	40	9	11	20	40	61	−21	38	Relegation to Cypriot Second Division
13	Enosis Neon Paralimni (R)	40	8	10	22	35	61	−26	34	Relegation to Cypriot Second Division
14	Karmiotissa (R)	40	4	12	24	36	98	−62	24	Relegation to Cypriot Second Division

Source: Cyprus Football Association
Rules for classification: 1) Points; 2) Head-to-head points; 3) Head-to-head goal difference; 4) Head-to-head goals scored; 5) Head-to-head away goals scored (only if two teams); 6) Goal difference; 7) Goals scored; 8) Play-off (only if deciding champion or UEFA competitions).
(R) Relegated

===== Results summary =====
Overall								Home						Away					
Pld	W	D	L	GF	GA	GD	Pts	W	D	L	GF	GA	GD	W	D	L	GF	GA	GD
14	10	1	3	27	11	+16	31	5	1	1	14	6	+8	5	0	2	13	5	+8

Last updated: 29 May 2021.
Source: Results

===== Results by results =====
Matchday	1	2	3	4	5	6	7	8	9	10	11	12	13	14
Ground	H	H	A	H	H	A	A	A	A	H	A	H	A	H
Result	W	D	L	W	W	W	W	L	W	W	W	W	W	L
Position	7	7	7	7	8	8	7	7	7	7	7	7	7	7

Updated to match(es) played on 29 May 2021. Source: Results
A = Away; H = Home; W = Win; D = Draw; L = Loss; P = Postponed

===== Results =====
1 March 2021 27	Pafos	2–1	Karmiotissa	Paphos
16:30 EET (UTC+2)	Arajuuri 8'; Aurélio 37'; Kvída (yellow card) 71'; Vá (yellow card) 90+5'	Report	Valente (yellow card) 44'; Sassi (yellow card) 62'; Romo 69' (pen.) (yellow card) 76'	Stadium: Stelios Kyriakides Stadium; Referee: Konstantinos Fellas

6 March 2021 28	Pafos	1–1	APOEL	Paphos
16:00 EET (UTC+2)	Bérigaud 84'	Report	De Vincenti 51'	Stadium: Stelios Kyriakides Stadium; Referee: Nikolas Neokleous

12 March 2021 29	Doxa Katokopias	1–0	Pafos	Nicosia
16:00 EET (UTC+2)	Carlos (yellow card) 48'; Golobart 88'	Report	Foor (yellow card) 35'; Fylaktou (yellow card) 80'; Vá (yellow card) 84'	Stadium: Makario Stadium; Referee: Marios Christoforou

20 March 2021 30	Pafos	3–0	Nea Salamis Famagusta	Paphos
16:00 EET (UTC+2)	Bérigaud 8'; Vá 26'; Aurélio (yellow card) 60'; Puncheon (yellow card) 89'; Valakari 90+3'	Report	Barnes (yellow card) 45+2'	Stadium: Stelios Kyriakides Stadium; Referee: Kyriakos Christodoulou

12 April 2021 32	Pafos	3–1	Ermis Aradippou	Paphos
19:00 EET (UTC+2)	Bérigaud 19', 40'; Puncheon (yellow card) 24'; Hepburn-Murphy 88'	Report	Meira (yellow card) 13'; Panteli 90+2'	Stadium: Stelios Kyriakides Stadium; Referee: Vasilis Demetriou

19 April 2021 33	Ethnikos Achna	0–2	Pafos	Achna
17:00 EET (UTC+2)	C.Elia (yellow card) 62'	Report	Saiz (yellow card) 12'; Arajuuri (yellow card) 23'; Bérigaud 54'; Panić (yellow card) 60'; Kvída (yellow card) 76'; Valakari (yellow card) 79'; Torres 90'	Stadium: Dasaki Stadium; Referee: Gioorgos Nikolaou

24 April 2021 34	Karmiotissa	0–6	Pafos	Paphos
17:00 EET (UTC+2)	Chadjivasilis (yellow card) 30'; C.Kapsos (red card) 30'	Report	Puncheon 15'; Hepburn-Murphy 37', 68'; Panić (yellow card) 45+2'; Bérigaud 53'; Torres 71', 78'	Stadium: Stelios Kyriakides Stadium; Referee: Constantinos Photiou

28 April 2021 31	Enosis Neon Paralimni	2–1	Pafos	Paralimni
16:00 EET (UTC+2)	Kvída 33' (o.g.); Barny (yellow card) 45+1'; Theodorou 49'	Report	Antoniou 24'; Aurélio (yellow card) 27'	Stadium: Paralimni Stadium; Referee: Nikolas Neokleous
Note: Match originally scheduled for 4 April, but postponed on 30 March due to a COVID-19 outbreak within the Enosis squad.

5 May 2021 35	APOEL	0–1	Pafos	Strovolos
17:00 EEST (UTC+3)	Wheeler (yellow card) 67'; Anuar (yellow card) 90+3'	Report	Bérigaud 2'; Kvída (yellow card) 30' (yellow-red card) 81'; Panić (yellow card) 31'; Puncheon (yellow card) 90+3'	Stadium: GSP Stadium; Referee: Demetris Koumi

12 May 2021 36	Pafos	2–1	Doxa Katokopias	Paphos
18:00 EET (UTC+2)	Vá 16'; Saiz (yellow card) 45+2'; Torres 56'; Valakari (yellow card) 81'; Hepburn-Murphy (yellow card) 90+4'	Report	Kikas 26'; Englezou (yellow card) 31'; Luís Carlos (yellow card) 58'; Oliveira (yellow card) 61'; Golobart (yellow card) 76'; Mouhtaris (yellow card) 90+4'	Stadium: Stelios Kyriakides Stadium; Referee: Loukas Soteriou

16 May 2021 38	Nea Salamis Famagusta	1–2	Pafos	Larnaca
18:00 EET (UTC+2)	Danilo 25'; Wágner (yellow card) 37'; T.Nicolaou (yellow card) 79'	Report	Vá 47'; Puncheon (yellow card) 71'; Bérigaud 78'	Stadium: Ammochostos Stadium; Referee: Chrysovalantis Theeouli

20 May 2021 38	Pafos	2–0	Enosis Neon Paralimni	Paphos
18:00 EET (UTC+2)	Bérigaud 4', 13'	Report		Stadium: Stelios Kyriakides Stadium; Referee: Giorgos Nikolaou

24 May 2021 39	Ermis Aradippou	1–2	Pafos	Larnaca
18:00 EET (UTC+2)	I.Kaiserlidis (yellow card) 40'; Roushias 61'; Valpoort (yellow card) 80'; Karagounis (yellow card) 85'	Report	Fylaktou (yellow card) 33'; Bérigaud 45+4'; Saiz (yellow card) 53'; Aurélio (yellow card) 60'; Kvída 83'	Stadium: Ammochostos Stadium; Referee: Demetris Koumi

29 May 2021 40	Pafos	1–2	Ethnikos Achna	Paphos
18:00 EET (UTC+2)	Valerianos (yellow card) 44'; Cabral 59'; Vá (yellow card) 90+1'	Report	Papageorgiou 14'; Antoniou 65' (o.g.); Christofi (yellow card) 73'; Peratikos (yellow card) 90+1'	Stadium: Stelios Kyriakides Stadium; Referee: Yiannis Anastasiou

=== Cypriot Cup ===
16 September 2020 First Round	Ayia Napa	1–5	Pafos	Ayia Napa
17:00 EEST (UTC+3)	M.Criaco 13'; I.Antoniou (yellow card) 20' (yellow-red card) 66'	Report	Saiz 8'; Valakari 28', 50'; Vá 40'; Bérigaud 44'	Stadium: Municipal Stadium of Ayia Napa; Referee: Andreas Argyrou

4 November 2020 Second Round	Anorthosis Famagusta	1–0	Pafos	Larnaca
17:00 EET (UTC+2)	Christofi 45+2'; Daushvili (yellow card) 51'	Report		Stadium: Antonis Papadopoulos Stadium; Referee: Chrysovalantis Theouli

== Squad statistics ==
As of match played 29 May 2021

=== Appearances and goals ===
No.	Pos	Nat	Player	Total		Cyta Championship		Cypriot Cup	
No.	Pos	Nat	Player	Apps	Goals	Apps	Goals	Apps	Goals
1	GK	(Ukraine) UKR	Artur Rudko	39	0	38	0	1	0
2	DF	(Colombia) COL	Camilo Saiz	38	3	35+1	2	2	1
4	DF	(Czech Republic) CZE	Josef Kvída	28	1	27+1	1	0	0
5	DF	(Cyprus) CYP	Kyriakos Antoniou	13	1	7+5	1	1	0
7	FW	(Angola) ANG	Vá	25	5	18+5	4	2	1
8	MF	(United States) USA	Mukwelle Akale	8	0	0+6	0	0+2	0
9	FW	(France) FRA	Kévin Bérigaud	36	14	30+4	13	2	1
10	FW	(Argentina) ARG	Marcelo Torres	30	7	15+15	7	0	0
11	FW	(England) ENG	Rushian Hepburn-Murphy	23	5	11+12	5	0	0
12	GK	(Cyprus) CYP	Evgenios Petrou	2	0	2	0	0	0
15	DF	(Greece) GRE	Giorgos Valerianos	20	0	15+3	0	1+1	0
17	MF	(Ukraine) UKR	Orest Kuzyk	13	1	7+5	1	1	0
19	MF	(Netherlands) NED	Navarone Foor	36	1	32+2	1	2	0
20	DF	(Portugal) POR	João Aurélio	39	1	36+1	1	2	0
21	MF	(Cyprus) CYP	Gerasimos Fylaktou	19	0	11+8	0	0	0
23	DF	(Finland) FIN	Paulus Arajuuri	28	1	27	1	1	0
24	MF	(Finland) FIN	Onni Valakari	38	15	36	13	2	2
25	GK	(England) ENG	Will Mannion	1	0	0	0	1	0
26	FW	(Cape Verde) CPV	Jerson Cabral	17	1	9+8	1	0	0
27	DF	(Spain) ESP	Víctor Álvarez	4	0	4	0	0	0
28	MF	(Serbia) SRB	Stefan Panić	22	1	20+2	1	0	0
33	FW	(Cyprus) CYP	Lysandros Papastylianou	1	0	0+1	0	0	0
42	MF	(England) ENG	Jason Puncheon	31	4	27+2	4	1+1	0
66	DF	(Russia) RUS	Pavel Lelyukhin	7	0	2+5	0	0	0
86	MF	(Cyprus) CYP	Alexandros Spontas	4	0	0+4	0	0	0
92	FW	(Latvia) LAT	Deniss Rakels	26	1	5+19	1	1+1	0
Players away on loan:
18	DF	(France) FRA	Mickaël Panos	4	0	3+1	0	0	0
Players who appeared for Pafos but left during the season:
3	DF	(Uruguay) URU	Joaquín Varela	9	0	5+4	0	0	0
6	DF	(England) ENG	Sam Hutchinson	6	0	5	0	1	0
13	MF	(Russia) RUS	Danila Yanov	4	0	1+2	0	0+1	0
34	MF	(Wales) WAL	Jack Evans	3	0	1+1	0	1	0
70	MF	(Colombia) COL	Brayan Angulo	14	1	10+4	1	0	0

=== Goal scorers ===
Place	Position	Nation	Number	Name	Cyta Championship	Cypriot Cup	Total
1	MF	(Finland)	24	Onni Valakari	13	2	15
2	FW	(France)	9	Kévin Bérigaud	13	1	14
3	FW	(Argentina)	10	Marcelo Torres	7	0	7
4	FW	(England)	11	Rushian Hepburn-Murphy	5	0	5
4	FW	(Angola)	7	Vá	4	1	5
6	MF	(England)	42	Jason Puncheon	4	0	4
7	DF	(Colombia)	2	Camilo Saiz	2	1	3
8	MF	(Colombia)	70	Brayan Angulo	1	0	1
8	MF	(Ukraine)	17	Orest Kuzyk	1	0	1
8	MF	(Netherlands)	19	Navarone Foor	1	0	1
8	FW	(Latvia)	92	Deniss Rakels	1	0	1
8	MF	(Serbia)	28	Stefan Panić	1	0	1
8	DF	(Finland)	23	Paulus Arajuuri	1	0	1
8	DF	(Portugal)	20	João Aurélio	1	0	1
8	DF	(Cyprus)	5	Kyriakos Antoniou	1	0	1
8	DF	(Czech Republic)	4	Josef Kvída	1	0	1
8	FW	(Cape Verde)	26	Jerson Cabral	1	0	1
Total					58	5	63

=== Clean sheets ===
Place	Position	Nation	Number	Name	Cyta Championship	Cypriot Cup	Total
1	GK	(Ukraine)	1	Artur Rudko	15	0	15
TOTALS					15	0	15

=== Disciplinary record ===
Number	Nation	Position	Name	Cyta Championship		Cypriot Cup		Total	
Number	Nation	Position	Name	Booked	Sent off (straight red)	Booked	Sent off (straight red)	Booked	Sent off (straight red)
1	(Ukraine)	GK	Artur Rudko	1	0	0	0	1	0
2	(Colombia)	DF	Camilo Saiz	8	0	0	0	8	0
4	(Czech Republic)	DF	Josef Kvída	10	1	0	0	10	1
5	(Cyprus)	DF	Kyriakos Antoniou	3	0	0	0	3	0
7	(Angola)	FW	Vá	6	0	0	0	6	0
9	(France)	FW	Kévin Bérigaud	3	0	0	0	3	0
10	(Argentina)	FW	Marcelo Torres	1	0	0	0	1	0
11	(England)	FW	Rushian Hepburn-Murphy	3	0	0	0	3	0
15	(Greece)	DF	Giorgos Valerianos	4	0	0	0	4	0
19	(Netherlands)	MF	Navarone Foor	6	1	0	0	6	1
20	(Portugal)	DF	João Aurélio	7	0	0	0	7	0
21	(Cyprus)	MF	Gerasimos Fylaktou	3	0	0	0	3	0
23	(Finland)	DF	Paulus Arajuuri	6	0	0	0	6	0
24	(Finland)	MF	Onni Valakari	6	1	0	0	6	1
27	(Spain)	DF	Víctor Álvarez	1	0	0	0	1	0
28	(Serbia)	MF	Stefan Panić	6	1	0	0	6	1
42	(England)	MF	Jason Puncheon	9	0	0	0	9	0
66	(Russia)	DF	Pavel Lelyukhin	3	0	0	0	3	0
Players away on loan:
Players who left Pafos during the season:
6	(England)	DF	Sam Hutchinson	2	1	0	0	2	1
13	(Russia)	MF	Danila Yanov	1	0	0	0	1	0
34	(Wales)	MF	Jack Evans	1	0	0	0	1	0
70	(Colombia)	MF	Brayan Angulo	2	0	0	0	2	0
Total				92	5	0	0	92	5
