= List of Cypriot football transfers winter 2022–23 =

This is a list of Cypriot football transfers in the winter transfer window, by club. Only clubs of the 2022–23 Cypriot First Division are included.

== 2022-23 Cypriot First Division ==
=== AEK Larnaca ===
In: Note: Flags indicate national team as defined under FIFA eligibility rules; some limited exceptions apply. Players may hold more than one non-FIFA nationality.

No.	Pos.	Nation	Player
20	FW	UKR	Artem Hromov (from (Ukraine) Dnipro-1)
44	FW	CRO	Marin Jakoliš (on loan from (France) Angers)
99	FW	HUN	Nemanja Nikolić (from (Turkey) Pendikspor)

Out: Note: Flags indicate national team as defined under FIFA eligibility rules; some limited exceptions apply. Players may hold more than one non-FIFA nationality.

No.	Pos.	Nation	Player
9	FW	VEN	José Romo (to (Cyprus) AEL Limassol)
19	FW	NGA	Victor Olatunji (on loan to (Czech Republic) Slovan Liberec)
22	FW	CYP	Theodosis Siathas (to (Cyprus) Omonia 29 Maiou, previously on loan to (Cyprus) Doxa Katokopias)
88	FW	GHA	Ernest Asante (loan return to (Cyprus) Doxa Katokopias)

=== AEL Limassol ===
In: Note: Flags indicate national team as defined under FIFA eligibility rules; some limited exceptions apply. Players may hold more than one non-FIFA nationality.

No.	Pos.	Nation	Player
28	MF	LTU	Fedor Černych (from (Poland) Jagiellonia Białystok)
33	MF	ARG	Javier Mendoza (from (Greece) Ionikos)
90	FW	VEN	José Romo (from (Cyprus) AEK Larnaca)
91	DF	BEL	Sébastien Dewaest (from (Belgium) KRC Genk)

Out: Note: Flags indicate national team as defined under FIFA eligibility rules; some limited exceptions apply. Players may hold more than one non-FIFA nationality.

No.	Pos.	Nation	Player
12	FW	SRB	Stefan Šćepović (to (Australia) Brisbane Roar)
13	DF	BRA	Bruno Santos (to (Brazil) Goiás)
30	MF	SRB	Lazar Pavlović (to (Serbia) Radnički Niš)
77	FW	CMR	Donaldoni Nguemechieu (to (Greece) Apollon Pontus)
99	MF	SEN	Amadou Ciss (loan return to (France) Amiens)

=== Akritas Chlorakas ===
In: Note: Flags indicate national team as defined under FIFA eligibility rules; some limited exceptions apply. Players may hold more than one non-FIFA nationality.

No.	Pos.	Nation	Player
22	FW	POR	Matheus Clemente (from (Bulgaria) Cherno More Varna)
24	DF	CRO	Vinko Međimorec (from (Cyprus) Karmiotissa Polemidion)
32	FW	ARG	Marcelo Torres (on loan from (Cyprus) Pafos)
80	FW	CPV	Vasco Lopes (from (Portugal) Farense)

Out: Note: Flags indicate national team as defined under FIFA eligibility rules; some limited exceptions apply. Players may hold more than one non-FIFA nationality.

No.	Pos.	Nation	Player
3	DF	CPV	Seid Korac (loan return to (Denmark) Esbjerg fB)
6	DF	CYP	Ioannis Katsiamis (on loan to (Cyprus) Ethnikos Assia, previously on loan to (Cyprus) Alki Oroklini)
12	DF	CYP	Giorgos Vasiliou (to (Cyprus) ASIL Lysi)
17	FW	ESP	Jawad El Jemili (to (Bulgaria) Levski Sofia)
18	FW	BRA	Pedrinho (loan return to (Brazil) Ponte Preta)
21	DF	ARG	Balthazar Bernardi (loan return to (Argentina) Boca Juniors)
30	FW	BRA	Rodrigo Varanda (loan return to (Brazil) Corinthians)
33	FW	BRA	Reginaldo (loan return to (Brazil) Audax)
58	MF	CYP	Giorgos Vasou (to (Cyprus) ENAD)

=== Anorthosis Famagusta ===
In: Note: Flags indicate national team as defined under FIFA eligibility rules; some limited exceptions apply. Players may hold more than one non-FIFA nationality.

No.	Pos.	Nation	Player
8	MF	ESP	Sergio Tejera (from (Spain) Cartagena)
15	FW	ESP	Miguel Ángel Guerrero (from (Greece) OFI Crete)
21	FW	ESP	Antoñín (on loan from (Spain) Granada)
90	FW	SVK	Samuel Mráz (on loan from (Italy) Spezia)

Out: Note: Flags indicate national team as defined under FIFA eligibility rules; some limited exceptions apply. Players may hold more than one non-FIFA nationality.

No.	Pos.	Nation	Player
9	FW	CRO	Dejan Radonjić (to (Croatia) HNK Šibenik)
10	MF	GRE	Lazaros Christodoulopoulos (to (Greece) Aris)
94	MF	EGY	Amr Warda (to (Cyprus) Apollon Limassol)

=== APOEL ===
In: Note: Flags indicate national team as defined under FIFA eligibility rules; some limited exceptions apply. Players may hold more than one non-FIFA nationality.

No.	Pos.	Nation	Player
31	FW	COM	Ben Nabouhane (from (Serbia) Red Star Belgrade)
91	FW	ITA	Federico Macheda (on loan from (Turkey) MKE Ankaragücü)

Out: Note: Flags indicate national team as defined under FIFA eligibility rules; some limited exceptions apply. Players may hold more than one non-FIFA nationality.

No.	Pos.	Nation	Player
4	DF	MDA	Daniel Dumbravanu (loan return to (Italy) SPAL)
9	FW	CRO	Anton Maglica (to (Romania) CFR Cluj)
17	MF	GER	Danny Blum (to (Germany) 1. FC Nürnberg)
23	MF	SWE	Amel Mujanić (loan return to (Sweden) Malmö FF)
35	MF	CYP	Paris Polykarpou (from (Cyprus) POX FC)
55	MF	BRA	Carlos Dias (on loan to (United Arab Emirates) Fujairah)
78	GK	CYP	Stefanos Kittos (from (Cyprus) POX FC)
89	DF	CYP	Nikolas Koutsakos (on loan to (Cyprus) Ethnikos Piraeus, previously on loan to POX FC)
90	FW	POR	Rafael Moreira (on loan to (Cyprus) Enosis Neon Paralimni)

=== Apollon Limassol ===
In: Note: Flags indicate national team as defined under FIFA eligibility rules; some limited exceptions apply. Players may hold more than one non-FIFA nationality.

No.	Pos.	Nation	Player
2	DF	NGA	Godswill Ekpolo (from (Sweden) IFK Norrköping)
18	MF	NOR	Etzaz Hussain (from (Norway) Molde)
31	FW	GHA	Godsway Donyoh (from (Azerbaijan) Neftçi)
74	MF	EGY	Amr Warda (from (Cyprus) Anorthosis Famagusta)

Out: Note: Flags indicate national team as defined under FIFA eligibility rules; some limited exceptions apply. Players may hold more than one non-FIFA nationality.

No.	Pos.	Nation	Player
10	MF	FRA	Hervin Ongenda (to (Romania) Rapid București)
13	FW	GEO	Revaz Injgia (to (Georgia (country)) Samtredia, previously on loan to (Cyprus) Doxa Katokopias)
14	DF	CYP	Giorgos Malekkides (on loan to (Cyprus) Nea Salamis Famagusta)
16	MF	ESP	Recio
19	DF	POR	Euclides Cabral
70	MF	GRE	Dimitrios Pinakas (loan return to (Greece) Olympiacos B)

=== Aris Limassol ===
In: Note: Flags indicate national team as defined under FIFA eligibility rules; some limited exceptions apply. Players may hold more than one non-FIFA nationality.

No.	Pos.	Nation	Player
88	FW	BLR	Artyom Shumansky (from (Belarus) BATE Borisov)

Out: Note: Flags indicate national team as defined under FIFA eligibility rules; some limited exceptions apply. Players may hold more than one non-FIFA nationality.

No.	Pos.	Nation	Player
28	GK	CYP	Neofytos Stylianou (to (Greece) Irodotos)
72	MF	GAB	Floriss Djave (on loan to (Cyprus) Enosis Neon Paralimni)
89	FW	CYP	Theodoros Iosifidis (on loan to (Cyprus) Omonia 29 Maiou)

=== Doxa Katokopias ===
In: Note: Flags indicate national team as defined under FIFA eligibility rules; some limited exceptions apply. Players may hold more than one non-FIFA nationality.

No.	Pos.	Nation	Player
14	DF	FIN	Juhani Ojala
26	DF	COL	Sebastián Herrera (from (North Macedonia) Bregalnica Štip)
88	FW	GHA	Ernest Asante (loan return from (Cyprus) AEK Larnaca)
92	FW	SRB	Nikola Trujić

Out: Note: Flags indicate national team as defined under FIFA eligibility rules; some limited exceptions apply. Players may hold more than one non-FIFA nationality.

No.	Pos.	Nation	Player
2	DF	CRC	Diego Mesén (to (Costa Rica) Cartaginés)
8	FW	CYP	Theodoros Iosifidis (loan return to (Cyprus) Apollon Limassol)
13	FW	GEO	Revaz Injgia (loan return to (Cyprus) Apollon Limassol)
18	FW	COL	Johan Rodallega (loan return to (Colombia) Atlético Cali)
19	FW	CYP	Theodosis Siathas (loan return to (Cyprus) AEK Larnaca)
24	MF	ESP	Álex Vallejo (to (Poland) Stal Mielec)
34	FW	AUT	Alex Sobczyk (to (Poland) Piast Gliwice)
77	FW	BEL	Ibrahim Kargbo (loan return to (Ukraine) Dynamo Kyiv)

=== Enosis Neon Paralimni ===
In: Note: Flags indicate national team as defined under FIFA eligibility rules; some limited exceptions apply. Players may hold more than one non-FIFA nationality.

No.	Pos.	Nation	Player
16	FW	ESP	Victor Fernández (from (Greece) Volos)
27	MF	GAB	Floriss Djave (on loan from (Cyprus) Aris Limassol)
53	MF	CYP	Paris Polykarpou (on loan from (Cyprus) APOEL)
91	MF	POR	Rafael Moreira (on loan from (Cyprus) APOEL)

Out: Note: Flags indicate national team as defined under FIFA eligibility rules; some limited exceptions apply. Players may hold more than one non-FIFA nationality.

No.	Pos.	Nation	Player
52	FW	SRB	Branko Mihajlovic
70	MF	ISR	Yehonathan Levy (to (Israel) Maccabi Petah Tikva)

=== Karmiotissa ===
In: Note: Flags indicate national team as defined under FIFA eligibility rules; some limited exceptions apply. Players may hold more than one non-FIFA nationality.

No.	Pos.	Nation	Player
91	MF	ESP	Jon Gaztañaga (from (India) NorthEast United)
92	MF	NGA	Rasheed Yusuf (on loan from (Nigeria) Right2Win)
94	FW	NED	Danzell Gravenberch (from (Netherlands) De Graafschap)
97	MF	MAR	Karim Loukili (from (Hungary) Debreceni)

Out: Note: Flags indicate national team as defined under FIFA eligibility rules; some limited exceptions apply. Players may hold more than one non-FIFA nationality.

No.	Pos.	Nation	Player
19	MF	CRO	Vinko Međimorec (to (Cyprus) Akritas Chlorakas)
22	MF	CZE	Josef Hušbauer (to (Cyprus) Ypsonas)
26	MF	CYP	Ioannis Chadjivasilis (to (Cyprus) AEZ Zakakiou)
33	MF	CYP	Andreas Christou (to (Cyprus) PO Achyronas-Onisilos)
99	FW	ARG	Emilio Zelaya (to (Saudi Arabia) Ohod)

=== Nea Salamis Famagusta ===
In: Note: Flags indicate national team as defined under FIFA eligibility rules; some limited exceptions apply. Players may hold more than one non-FIFA nationality.

No.	Pos.	Nation	Player
16	MF	ISR	Sintayehu Sallalich (from (Israel) Hapoel Tel Aviv)
—	DF	CYP	Giorgos Malekkides (on loan from (Cyprus) Apollon Limassol)
—	MF	POR	Edson Silva

Out: Note: Flags indicate national team as defined under FIFA eligibility rules; some limited exceptions apply. Players may hold more than one non-FIFA nationality.

No.	Pos.	Nation	Player
7	DF	CYP	Timotheos Pavlou (to (Cyprus) Omonia Aradippou)
11	MF	BEL	Stallone Limbombe (to (Cyprus) Othellos Athienou)
47	MF	CYP	Sotiris Fiakas (on loan to (Cyprus) Othellos Athienou)

=== Olympiakos Nicosia ===
In: Note: Flags indicate national team as defined under FIFA eligibility rules; some limited exceptions apply. Players may hold more than one non-FIFA nationality.

No.	Pos.	Nation	Player
30	FW	GRE	Petros Giakoumakis (on loan from (Greece) PAS Lamia)
50	FW	CMR	Lewis Enoh
55	MF	SWE	Abdul Khalili (from (Sweden) Helsingborg)
92	MF	HAI	Bryan Alceus (on loan from (Romania) Argeș Pitești)
96	FW	GRE	Fiorin Durmishaj (on loan from (Greece) OFI Crete)
—	DF	CRO	Toni Gorupec

Out: Note: Flags indicate national team as defined under FIFA eligibility rules; some limited exceptions apply. Players may hold more than one non-FIFA nationality.

No.	Pos.	Nation	Player
3	DF	ARM	Artur Kartashyan (to (Armenia) Van)
6	MF	MKD	Filip Duranski
8	MF	SRB	Saša Marković (to (Serbia) Mladost Novi Sad)
9	FW	HAI	Jonel Désiré (to (Armenia) Pyunik)
10	MF	HAI	Wilde-Donald Guerrier (to (Azerbaijan) Zira)
15	DF	ESP	Paco Puertas (to (Spain) CD Izarra)
33	DF	CYP	Charalampos Antoniou (on loan to (Cyprus) AEZ Zakakiou)

=== Omonia ===
In: Note: Flags indicate national team as defined under FIFA eligibility rules; some limited exceptions apply. Players may hold more than one non-FIFA nationality.

No.	Pos.	Nation	Player
29	FW	LBY	Ismael Tajouri-Shradi (from (United States) New England Revolution)
41	FW	UKR	Artem Besedin (on loan from (Ukraine) Dynamo Kyiv)
98	GL	CYP	Charalambos Kyriakides (loan return from (Cyprus) Omonia Aradippou)

Out: Note: Flags indicate national team as defined under FIFA eligibility rules; some limited exceptions apply. Players may hold more than one non-FIFA nationality.

No.	Pos.	Nation	Player
7	FW	BRA	Bruno Felipe (to (Cyprus) Pafos)
9	FW	SVN	Tim Matavž (to (Croatia) HNK Gorica)
88	FW	ENG	Gary Hooper (to (United Arab Emirates) Gulf United)

=== Pafos ===
In: Note: Flags indicate national team as defined under FIFA eligibility rules; some limited exceptions apply. Players may hold more than one non-FIFA nationality.

No.	Pos.	Nation	Player
11	FW	ESP	Jefté Betancor (on loan from (Romania) CFR Cluj)
26	GK	CRO	Ivica Ivušić (from (Croatia) NK Osijek)
27	FW	BRA	Bruno Felipe (from (Cyprus) AC Omonia)

Out: Note: Flags indicate national team as defined under FIFA eligibility rules; some limited exceptions apply. Players may hold more than one non-FIFA nationality.

No.	Pos.	Nation	Player
7	FW	CPV	Willy Semedo (to (Saudi Arabia) Al Faisaly)
9	FW	GER	Hamadi Al Ghaddioui (to (Germany) SV Sandhausen)
36	MF	BRA	João Pedro (loan return to (Brazil) Athletico Paranaense)
—	FW	ARG	Marcelo Torres (on loan to (Cyprus) Akritas Chlorakas, previously on loan to (Latvia) Riga)
—	FW	BRA	Douglas Aurélio (to (Latvia) Riga)
