= Cyprus national under-21 football team =

Cyprus U21
- Nickname(s): Εθνική Ελπίδων ("National team of Hopes")
- Association: Cyprus Football Association
- Head coach: Vacant
- Captain: Andreas Frangos
- Most caps: Marios Christodoulou (27)
- Top scorer: Christos Poyiatzis & Giorgos Nicolaou (5)
| First colours | Second colours |

First international
- Cyprus 0 - 0 Spain (Nicosia, Cyprus; 1978)

Biggest win
- Cyprus 6 - 0 San Marino (Nicosia, Cyprus; 2011)

Biggest defeat
- France 9 - 0 Cyprus (Grenoble, France; 2023)

UEFA U-21 Championship
- Appearances: None

The Cyprus national under-21 football team is the national under-21 football team for Cyprus. It is controlled by the Cyprus Football Association.

The team drew their first official match 0–0 in 1978 at home to Spain in a qualifying match for the 1980 UEFA European Under-21 Football Championship. They then drew 0–0 with the trophy holders Yugoslavia, also at home. They lost both away games though. And finished last in the group of three teams, with two points from four games, and so did not qualify for the Finals.

In the qualifying stages for the 1982 UEFA European Under-21 Football Championship, Cyprus made history when they defeated France 2–1 in Cyprus as it was the countries first ever official victory at National or Under-21 football level. The scorer of the Cypriot goals was Islington born Kikis Kyriacou of Olympiakos Nicosia whose promising career was brought to a premature end following a horrific leg injury.

In the qualifying stages for the 1992 UEFA European Under-21 Football Championship, the team beat Greece 1-0 and drew 1–1 with Sweden who went on to reach the Final. Cyprus finished last in their qualifying group with three points, the same number as Greece.

The Under 21 team made gradual improvements and in September 1999, in a qualifying match for the 2000 UEFA European Under-21 Football Championship, drew 1–1 in Spain, the eventual winners of the competition. The team finished fourth out of five teams in their qualifying group, ahead of Austria.

The qualifying stages for the 2004 UEFA European Under-21 Football Championship provided the greatest achievement for the Cyprus under-21 national team to date, when they finished second in Qualification Group One, with 15 points, winning five of their eight matches. France won the group with 22 points, seven points ahead of Cyprus.

In 2004, Cyprus joined the European Union, and Cypriot teams took advantage of the Bosman rule bringing in foreign players. This has meant that young Cypriot players are now not as common in the Cypriot First Division and is therefore also having an adverse effect on the under-21 national team.

== European Championship record Under-21 ==
| UEFA European Under-21 Championship record | | | | | | | | | UEFA European Under-21 Football Championship Qualification record | | | | | | |
| Year | Round | Pld | W | D | L | GF | GA | GD | Pld | W | D | L | GF | GA | GD |
|---|---|---|---|---|---|---|---|---|---|---|---|---|---|---|---|
| 1978 | did not enter | | | | | | | | - | | | | | | |
| 1980 | did not qualify | | | | | | | | 4 | 0 | 2 | 2 | 1 | 5 | −4 |
| 1982 | did not qualify | | | | | | | | 4 | 1 | 0 | 3 | 4 | 7 | −3 |
| 1984 | did not qualify | | | | | | | | 6 | 0 | 0 | 6 | 4 | 14 | −10 |
| 1986 | did not qualify | | | | | | | | 6 | 0 | 2 | 4 | 3 | 13 | -10 |
| 1988 | did not qualify | | | | | | | | 6 | 1 | 0 | 5 | 4 | 18 | −14 |
| 1990 | did not qualify | | | | | | | | 4 | 0 | 1 | 3 | 0 | 3 | −3 |
| 1992 | did not qualify | | | | | | | | 6 | 1 | 1 | 4 | 3 | 15 | −12 |
| (France) 1994 | did not qualify | | | | | | | | 8 | 0 | 0 | 8 | 4 | 21 | −17 |
| (Spain) 1996 | did not qualify | | | | | | | | 10 | 3 | 1 | 6 | 10 | 25 | −15 |
| (Romania) 1998 | did not qualify | | | | | | | | 8 | 3 | 1 | 4 | 16 | 15 | +1 |
| (Slovakia) 2000 | did not qualify | | | | | | | | 8 | 1 | 3 | 4 | 7 | 18 | −11 |
| (Switzerland) 2002 | did not qualify | | | | | | | | 8 | 3 | 0 | 5 | 9 | 17 | −8 |
| (Germany) 2004 | did not qualify | | | | | | | | 8 | 5 | 0 | 3 | 12 | 5 | +7 |
| (Portugal) 2006 | did not qualify | | | | | | | | 8 | 0 | 1 | 7 | 2 | 17 | -15 |
| (Netherlands) 2007 | did not qualify | | | | | | | | 2 | 0 | 0 | 2 | 0 | 3 | −3 |
| (Sweden) 2009 | did not qualify | | | | | | | | 8 | 2 | 0 | 6 | 9 | 15 | −6 |
| (Denmark) 2011 | did not qualify | | | | | | | | 8 | 2 | 0 | 6 | 8 | 13 | −5 |
| (Israel) 2013 | did not qualify | | | | | | | | 10 | 4 | 0 | 6 | 16 | 20 | −4 |
| (Czech Republic) 2015 | did not qualify | | | | | | | | 8 | 2 | 0 | 6 | 7 | 21 | −14 |
| (Poland) 2017 | did not qualify | | | | | | | | 5 | 0 | 1 | 4 | 2 | 12 | −10 |
| (Italy) (San Marino) 2019 | Qualification in progress | | | | | | | | 8 | 2 | 0 | 6 | 7 | 18 | -11 |
| Total | 0/21 | 0 | 0 | 0 | 0 | 0 | 0 | 0 | 139 | 32 | 19 | 99 | 132 | 286 | −154 |

=== UEFA U-21 Euro 2019 qualification ===
| Pos | Team | Pld | W | D | L | GF | GA | GD | Pts | Qualification | Belgium | Sweden | Turkey | Hungary | Cyprus | Malta |
|---|---|---|---|---|---|---|---|---|---|---|---|---|---|---|---|---|
| 1 | Belgium | 10 | 8 | 2 | 0 | 23 | 5 | +18 | 26 | Final tournament | — | 1–1 | 0–0 | 3–0 | 3–2 | 2–1 |
| 2 | Sweden | 10 | 6 | 2 | 2 | 19 | 8 | +11 | 20 | | 0–3 | — | 0–1 | 1–0 | 4–1 | 3–0 |
| 3 | Turkey | 10 | 5 | 2 | 3 | 14 | 10 | +4 | 17 | | 1–2 | 0–3 | — | 0–0 | 4–0 | 4–2 |
| 4 | Hungary | 10 | 3 | 2 | 5 | 12 | 14 | −2 | 11 | | 0–3 | 2–2 | 1–2 | — | 4–0 | 2–1 |
| 5 | Cyprus | 10 | 2 | 1 | 7 | 8 | 23 | −15 | 7 | | 0–2 | 0–1 | 2–1 | 0–2 | — | 2–1 |
| 6 | Malta | 10 | 1 | 1 | 8 | 8 | 24 | −16 | 4 | | 0–4 | 0–4 | 0–1 | 2–1 | 1–1 | — |

Source: UEFA

| 1 September 2017 | Cyprus | 2–1 | Malta | AEK Arena, Larnaca |
| 18:00 | Anastasiou 41'; Iosifidis 90+3' | Report | Borg 34' | Referee: Stefan Apostolov (Bulgaria) |

| 5 September 2017 | Sweden | 4–1 | Cyprus | Falkenbergs IP, Falkenberg |
| 18:45 | Strandberg 3', 5', 38'; Rakip 90+1' | Report | Elia 90+3' | Referee: Omar Pashayev (Azerbaijan) |

| 5 October 2017 | Cyprus | 2–1 | Turkey | AEK Arena, Larnaca |
| 16:00 | Karo 53'; Soteriou 58' | Report | Çınar 41' | Referee: Daniel Siebert (Germany) |

| 10 October 2017 | Cyprus | 0–2 | Belgium | AEK Arena, Larnaca |
| 16:00 | | Report | Lukebakio 51'; Bastien 90+3' | Referee: Kirill Levnikov (Russia) |

| 9 November 2017 | Belgium | 3–2 | Cyprus | Den Dreef, Leuven |
| 20:00 | Mbenza 15'; Dimata 45+2'; Leya Iseka 90+2' | Report | Papageorgiou 49'; Frangos 75' | Referee: Enea Jorgji (Albania) |

| 14 November 2017 | Cyprus | 0–2 | Hungary | AEK Arena, Larnaca |
| 15:00 | | Report | Sallói 50'; Haris 80' | Referee: Horatiu Fesnic (Romania) |

| 22 March 2018 | Hungary | 4–0 | Cyprus | Hidegkuti Nándor Stadion, Budapest |
| 20:00 | Bíró 8'; Szalai 23'; Kyriakou 49' (o.g.); Zsótér 75' | Report | | Referee: Rob Harvey (Republic of Ireland) |

| 27 March 2018 | Cyprus | 0–1 | Sweden | AEK Arena, Larnaca |
| 14:00 | | Report | Brorsson 90+7' | Referee: Fabio Verissimo (Portugal) |

| 7 September 2018 | Turkey | 4–0 | Cyprus | Recep Tayyip Erdoğan, Istanbul |
| 18:00 (19:00 TRT) | Demirbağ 3'; Çınar 76', 81' (pen.); Hadjipaschalis 88' (o.g.) | Report | | Referee: Danilo Grujić (Serbia) |

| 16 October 2018 | Malta | 1–1 | Cyprus | Centenary Stadium, Ta' Qali |
| 17:00 | Nwoko 90+2' | Report | Wheeler 35' | Referee: Admir Šehović (Bosnia and Herzegovina) |

=== Friendly matches ===
| 20 May 2018 | Russia | 3–0 | Cyprus | Eduard Streltsov Stadium, Moscow, Russia |
| 14:00 UTC+2 | Oblyakov 72'; Melkadze 82'; Makarov 84' | Report | | Referee: Vitali Meshkov (Russia) |

== Coaching staff ==
| Position | Name |
|---|---|
| Coach | (Cyprus) Nikos Andronikou |
| Assistant coach | (Cyprus) Venizelos Tziambazis |
| Goalkeeper coach | (Cyprus) Christoforos Loizou |
| Fitness coach | (Cyprus) Constantinos Rostantis |

== Players ==
=== Current squad ===
Players born on or after 1 January 2004 are eligible for 2027 UEFA European Under-21 Championship qualifying games.

The following players were called up for the 2027 UEFA European Under-21 Championship qualification Group A matches against Romania, Kosovo and San Marino on 25, 30 September and 6 October 2026; respectively.

Caps and goals correct as of 6 October 2026, after the match against San Marino.

| No. | Pos. | Player | Date of birth (age) | Caps | Goals | Club |
|---|---|---|---|---|---|---|
| 1 | GK | Panagiotis Kyriakou | 5 May 2004 (age 22) | 15 | 0 | (Cyprus Football Association) AEL Limassol |
| 12 | GK | Gabriel Ortelli | 19 June 2006 (age 20) | 3 | 0 | (The Football Association) Watford |
| 22 | GK | Pantelis Michail | 27 October 2005 (age 21) | 0 | 0 | (Cyprus Football Association) Omonia |
| | GK | Anastasios Pisiias | 19 December 2006 (age 19) | 0 | 0 | (Cyprus Football Association) APEA Akrotiri |
| 2 | DF | Nearchos Zinonos | 29 January 2004 (age 22) | 18 | 3 | (Cyprus Football Association) Apollon Limassol |
| 3 | DF | Nikolaos Koutsoudakis | 16 July 2007 (age 19) | 3 | 0 | (Cyprus Football Association) Hellas Syros |
| 4 | DF | Konstantinos Venizelou | 5 July 2004 (age 22) | 17 | 1 | (Cyprus Football Association) Krasava ENY Ypsonas |
| 5 | DF | Giorgos Viktoros | 1 September 2005 (age 21) | 16 | 0 | (Cyprus Football Association) Omonia |
| 13 | DF | Konstantinos Panteli | 12 February 2005 (age 21) | 8 | 1 | (Cyprus Football Association) Omonia Aradippou |
| 14 | DF | Georgios Nikolas Angelopoulos | 5 May 2004 (age 22) | 17 | 0 | (Cyprus Football Association) APOEL |
| 15 | DF | Andreas Nikolaou | 31 March 2006 (age 20) | 3 | 0 | (Cyprus Football Association) Omonia Aradippou |
| 18 | DF | Kyriakos Kyriakou | 3 February 2006 (age 20) | 4 | 1 | (Cyprus Football Association) AEL Limassol |
| 21 | DF | Konstantinos Poursaitidis | 24 January 2006 (age 20) | 6 | 1 | (Cyprus Football Association) APOEL |
| 6 | MF | Zacharias Ioannidis | 27 March 2007 (age 19) | 4 | 0 | (The Football Association) Luton Town |
| 7 | MF | Argyris Christodoulou | 1 March 2007 (age 19) | 6 | 0 | (Portuguese Football Federation) Famalicão |
| 8 | MF | Stylianos Vrontis | 5 November 2004 (age 21) | 24 | 1 | (Cyprus Football Association) APOEL |
| 11 | MF | Konstantinos Evripidou | 26 April 2005 (age 21) | 8 | 0 | (Cyprus Football Association) Omonia Aradippou |
| 16 | MF | Konstantinos Pattichis | 5 August 2004 (age 22) | 9 | 0 | (Cyprus Football Association) PAC Omonia 29M |
| 17 | MF | Andreas Athanasiou | 24 April 2004 (age 22) | 10 | 1 | (Cyprus Football Association) Krasava ENY Ypsonas |
| 19 | MF | Dimitrianos Tzouliou | 19 January 2006 (age 20) | 8 | 0 | (Cyprus Football Association) Anorthosis Famagusta |
| 23 | MF | Ioannis Avramidis | 30 January 2006 (age 20) | 3 | 0 | (Cyprus Football Association) APOEL |
| 9 | FW | Evagoras Charalampous | 27 June 2005 (age 21) | 11 | 2 | (Cyprus Football Association) Anorthosis Famagusta |
| 10 | FW | Zanos Savva | 26 November 2005 (age 20) | 9 | 1 | (Cyprus Football Association) Olympiakos Nicosia |
| 20 | FW | Savvas Kontopoulos | 7 April 2008 (age 18) | 3 | 1 | (Cyprus Football Association) Digenis Akritas Morphou |
| | FW | Chrysis Evangelou | 3 November 2007 (age 19) | 5 | 0 | (Cyprus Football Association) Omonia |
| | FW | Lysandros Papastylianou | 29 November 2005 (age 20) | 4 | 1 | (Cyprus Football Association) Krasava ENY Ypsonas |
| | FW | Simonas Christofi | 31 October 2007 (age 19) | 0 | 0 | (Cyprus Football Association) AEL Limassol |

=== Recent call-ups ===
The following players have also been called up for Cyprus under-21's within the last twelve months and remain eligible for selection.

| Pos. | Player | Date of birth (age) | Caps | Goals | Club | Latest call-up |
|---|---|---|---|---|---|---|
| GK | Konstantinos Stylianou | 5 December 2004 (age 21) | 5 | 0 | (Cyprus) Apollon Limassol | v. Montenegro, 5 June 2026 |
| DF | Konstantinos Giannakou | 25 April 2005 (age 21) | 11 | 0 | (Cyprus) APOEL | v. Montenegro, 5 June 2026 |
| DF | Harry Mills | 17 March 2006 (age 20) | 4 | 0 | (England) Brighton & Hove Albion | v. Montenegro, 5 June 2026 |
| DF | Andreas Christou | 5 August 2005 (age 21) | 5 | 0 | (Cyprus) Omonia | v. Finland, 31 March 2026 |
| DF | Charalampos Erotokritou | 1 September 2005 (age 21) | 0 | 0 | (Cyprus) Doxa Katokopias | v. Finland, 31 March 2026 |
| DF | Charalampos Michalas | 16 July 2007 (age 19) | 0 | 0 | (Cyprus) Anorthosis Famagusta | v. Finland, 31 March 2026 |
| MF | Panagiotis Angeli | 22 March 2006 (age 20) | 1 | 0 | (Cyprus) Olympiakos Nicosia | v. Montenegro, 5 June 2026 |
| FW | Konstantinos Panagi | 23 April 2007 (age 19) | 1 | 0 | (Cyprus) Omonia | v. Montenegro, 5 June 2026 |
| FW | Nikolas Tsiattalas | 17 February 2007 (age 19) | 1 | 0 | (Cyprus) Iraklis Gerolakkou | v. Montenegro, 5 June 2026 |
| FW | Charalampos Kattirtzis | 12 April 2006 (age 20) | 0 | 0 | (Cyprus) PAEEK Kyrenia | v. Montenegro, 5 June 2026 |
| FW | Dimitris Solomou | 16 October 2006 (age 20) | 5 | 0 | (Cyprus) Enosis Neon Paralimniou | v. Finland, 31 March 2026 |
| FW | Michalis Theodosiou | 24 July 2008 (age 18) | 5 | 0 | (Cyprus) Aris Limassol | v. Finland, 31 March 2026 |

== See also ==
- Cyprus national football team
- Cyprus national under-19 football team
- Cyprus national under-17 football team
- UEFA European Under-21 Championship
