= Loizou =

Loizou or Loϊzou (Greek: Λοΐζου) is a Greek patronymic surname meaning "the son of Loizos". Notable people with this surname include:

- Christiana Loizu (originally Loizou; born 1990), Cypriot singer
- Christoforos Loizou (born 1969), Cypriot footballer
- Giorgos Loizou (born 1990), Cypriot footballer
- Loizos Loizou (born 2003), Cypriot footballer
- Olga Loizou (born 1961), Cypriot swimmer
- Philipos C. Loizou (1965–2012), American professor of engineering
