= Danila Yanov =

Russian footballer

Personal information
- Full name: Danila Andreevich Yanov
- Date of birth: 27 January 2000 (age 26)
- Place of birth: Penza, Russia
- Height: 1.72 m (5 ft 8 in)
- Position: Midfielder

Team information
- Current team: Shinnik Yaroslavl
- Number: 13

Youth career
- 2014-2017: Strogino Moscow
- 2018–2020: CSKA Moscow

Senior career*
Years	Team	Apps	(Gls)
2016–2018	Strogino Moscow	8	(0)
2020–2022	Riga	8	(2)
2020–2021	→ Pafos (loan)	3	(0)
2021	→ Olimp-Dolgoprudny (loan)	14	(1)
2022	→ Forte Taganrog (loan)	15	(0)
2022–2024	Khimki	1	(0)
2022–2023	→ Arsenal Tula (loan)	9	(0)
2022–2023	→ Arsenal-2 Tula (loan)	5	(0)
2023	→ SKA-Khabarovsk (loan)	5	(0)
2023	Khimki-M	3	(0)
2023–2024	→ Murom (loan)	31	(3)
2024–2025	Chayka Peschanokopskoye	31	(4)
2025–2026	SKA-Khabarovsk	32	(0)
2026–	Shinnik Yaroslavl	1	(0)

International career^{‡}
2017	Russia U17	3	(0)
2018–2019	Russia U19	6	(0)
- * Club domestic league appearances and goals as of 5 September 2026 ‡ National team caps and goals as of 21:46, 14 May 2021 (UTC)

Danila Andreevich Yanov (Russian: Данила Андреевич Янов; born 27 January 2000) is a Russian footballer who plays as a midfielder for Shinnik Yaroslavl.

== Career ==
In 2015, Yanov unsuccessfully trialed with Zürich in Switzerland and received an offer to join English Premier League side Manchester City's youth academy, but never joined due to residency problems.

At the age of 16, he debuted for Strogino Moscow in the Russian third division.

For the second half of 2017–18, Yanov rejected an offer from Portuguese outfit Leiria to sign for CSKA Moscow, one of Russia's most successful clubs, where he failed to make an appearance.

On 24 January 2020, Yanov left CSKA Moscow to join Riga for an undisclosed fee.

On 3 September 2020, Yanov joined Pafos on a season-long loan from Riga, returning to Riga in March 2021 after his loan was ended on 10 March 2021.

== Career statistics ==
=== Club ===
As of match played 8 June 2024

Appearances and goals by club, season and competition
Club	Season	League			National Cup		Continental		Other		Total	
Club	Season	Division	Apps	Goals	Apps	Goals	Apps	Goals	Apps	Goals	Apps	Goals
Strogino Moscow	2015–16	Russian Second League	3	0	0	0	—		—		3	0
Strogino Moscow	2016–17	Russian Second League	5	0	0	0	—		—		5	0
Strogino Moscow	2017–18	Russian Second League	0	0	0	0	—		—		0	0
Strogino Moscow	Total		8	0	0	0	0	0	0	0	8	0
Riga	2020	Latvian Higher League	2	0	—		0	0	5 (Note: Appearances in the FNL Cup)	1	7	1
Riga	2021	Latvian Higher League	6	2	0	0	0	0	—		6	2
Riga	Total		8	2	0	0	0	0	5	1	13	3
Pafos (loan)	2020–21	Cypriot First Division	3	0	1	0	—		—		4	0
Olimp-Dolgoprudny (loan)	2021–22	Russian First League	14	1	1	0	—		—		15	1
Forte Taganrog (loan)	2021–22	Russian Second League	15	0	—		—		—		15	0
Khimki	2022–23	Russian Premier League	0	0	—		—		—		0	0
Khimki	2023–24	Russian First League	1	0	—		—		—		1	0
Khimki	Total		1	0	0	0	0	0	0	0	1	0
Arsenal Tula (loan)	2022–23	Russian First League	9	0	1	0	—		—		10	0
Arsenal-2 Tula (loan)	2022–23	Russian Second League	5	0	—		—		—		5	0
SKA-Khabarovsk (loan)	2022–23	Russian First League	5	0	—		—		—		5	0
Khimki-M	2023	Russian Second League B	3	0	—		—		—		3	0
Murom (loan)	2023–24	Russian Second League A	31	3	1	0	—		—		32	3
Career total			102	6	4	0	0	0	5	1	111	7
