= Nick Kaaijmolen =

Dutch footballer

Personal information
- Date of birth: 28 August 2000 (age 26)
- Place of birth: Netherlands
- Height: 1.86 m (6 ft 1 in)
- Positions: Defensive midfielder; centre-back

Team information
- Current team: ADO '20
- Number: 16

Youth career
- SV Ilpendam
- 2011–2017: Volendam
- 2017–2018: Hollandia
- 2018–2020: De Graafschap

Senior career*
Years	Team	Apps	(Gls)
2020–2021	Telstar	0	(0)
2021	Prespa Birlik	7	(0)
2021–2022	APEA	24	(0)
2022–2023	PAEEK	5	(0)
2023	Njarðvík	0	(0)
2024	Lynx	4	(0)
2024–	ADO '20	0	(0)
- * Club domestic league appearances and goals as of 15 October 2024

Nick Kaaijmolen (born 28 August 2000) is a Dutch footballer who plays as a midfielder for ADO '20.

== Career ==
Kaaijmolen started his career with Dutch second-tier side Telstar. In 2021, he signed for Prespa Birlik in the Swedish fourth tier. After that, Kaaijmolen signed for Cypriot fourth tier club APEA. Before the second half of 2021–22, he signed for PAEEK in the Cypriot top flight. On 14 March 2022, he debuted for PAEEK during a 0–4 loss to Ethnikos.
