= Rushian Hepburn-Murphy =

English footballer (born 1998)

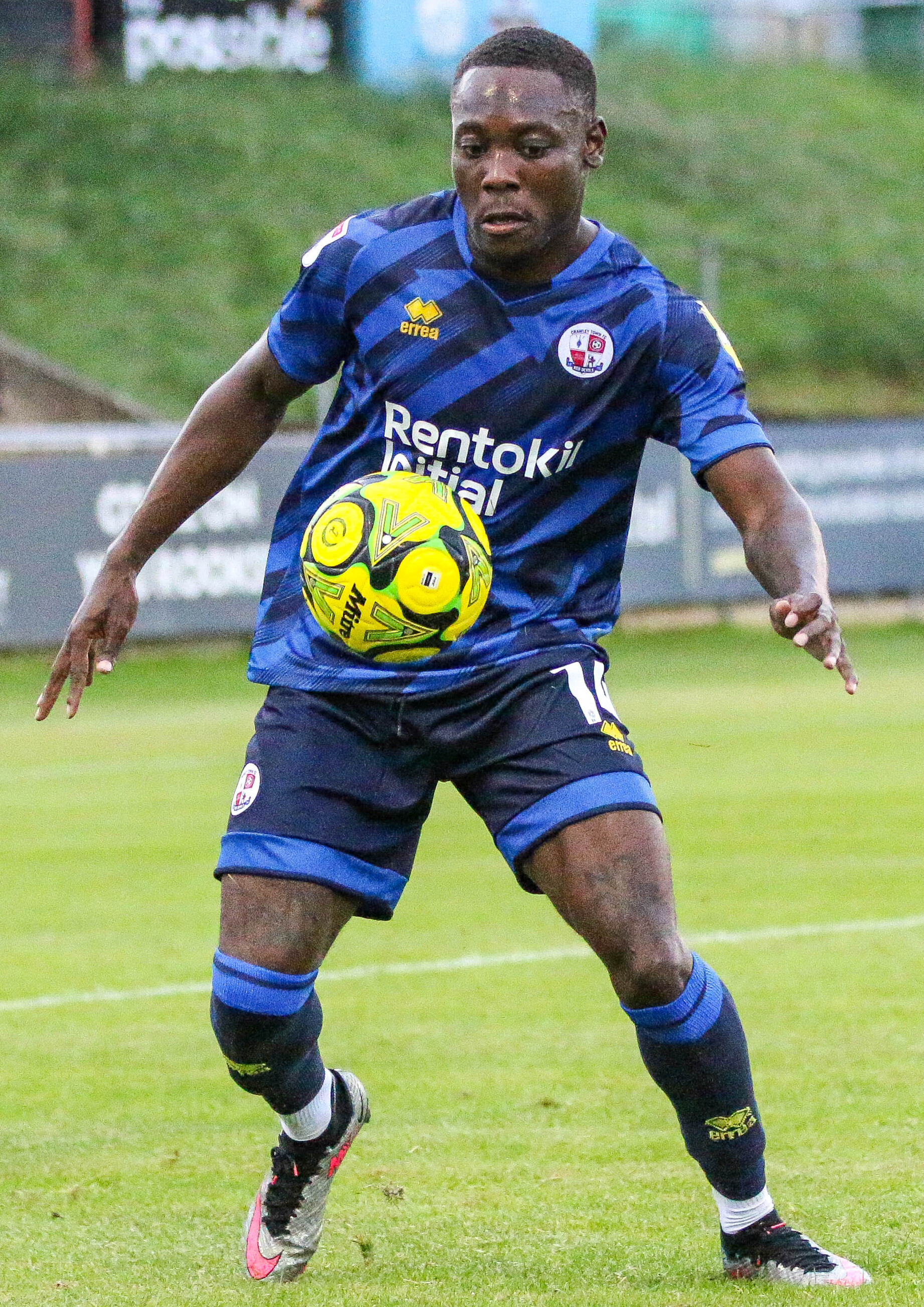
- Hepburn-Murphy in July 2024

Personal information
- Full name: Rushian Marcus Amari Hepburn-Murphy
- Date of birth: 28 August 1998 (age 28)
- Place of birth: Birmingham, England
- Height: 5 ft 8 in (1.73 m)
- Position: Forward

Team information
- Current team: Milton Keynes Dons
- Number: 29

Youth career
- –2015: Aston Villa

Senior career*
Years	Team	Apps	(Gls)
2015–2020	Aston Villa	13	(0)
2019	→ Cambridge United (loan)	16	(2)
2019–2020	→ Tranmere Rovers (loan)	17	(4)
2020	→ Derby County (loan)	0	(0)
2020–2022	Pafos	23	(5)
2022–2024	Swindon Town	50	(10)
2024–2025	Crawley Town	42	(10)
2025–	Milton Keynes Dons	36	(7)

International career^{‡}
2013	England U16	4	(0)
2015	England U17	2	(0)
2016	England U18	2	(0)
2016	England U19	5	(0)
2018	England U20	2	(0)
- * Club domestic league appearances and goals as of 15:00, 2 May 2026 (UTC) ‡ National team caps and goals as of 20:23, 27 March 2018 (UTC)

Rushian Marcus Amori Hepburn-Murphy (born 28 August 1998) is an English professional footballer who plays as a forward for EFL League One club Milton Keynes Dons.

== Club career ==
=== Aston Villa ===
Hepburn-Murphy is a product of the Aston Villa youth academy. On 14 March 2015, he made his league debut for Aston Villa, coming on as a substitute for the last seven minutes in place of Christian Benteke in the 4–0 away victory at Sunderland. At the age of 16 years and 176 days, he is the second youngest player in the club's history. He is also the youngest player to appear in a match for the club during the Premier League era.

==== Cambridge United (loan) ====
On 11 January 2019, Hepburn-Murphy agreed to join Cambridge United on loan for the remainder of the season.

==== Tranmere Rovers (loan) ====
On 2 August 2019, Hepburn-Murphy joined EFL League One side Tranmere Rovers F.C. on a season-long loan. He made his debut as a 45th-minute substitute in Tranmere's opening day 2–3 loss to Rochdale, picking up a 90th minute red card for violent conduct. On 2 November 2019, Hepburn-Murphy scored his first league goals for Tranmere, and his first ever career hattrick in a 3–1 victory over MK Dons. He returned to Aston Villa earlier than planned on 31 January 2020.

==== Derby County (loan) ====
On 31 January 2020, Hepburn-Murphy joined Derby County on loan for the rest of the season.

On 25 June 2020, Hepburn-Murphy's loan at Derby was ended without him making an appearance, as he was released by Aston Villa.

=== Pafos ===
On 15 July 2020, Hepburn-Murphy joined Pafos in the Cypriot First Division. In his first outing for Pafos, Hepburn-Murphy scored 7 goals in a single pre-season friendly game, a 9–0 victory against a Riga FC XI. Hepburn-Murphy made his competitive debut on 22 August 2020, in a 2–2 home draw against Omonia.

On 7 January 2021, Hepburn-Murphy scored his first ever goal in the Cypriot First Division, in a 5–0 victory over Olympiakos Nicosia.

Hepburn-Murphy was released at the end of the 2021–22 Cypriot First Division season, which he had missed the entirety of due to injury.

=== Swindon Town ===
On 1 September 2022, Hepburn-Murphy returned to England, joining League Two club Swindon Town. He made his Swindon Town debut on 20 September 2022, scoring their only goal in a 3–1 home defeat to Plymouth Argyle in the EFL Trophy. On 2 May 2024, Swindon announced he would be leaving in the summer when his contract expired.

=== Crawley Town ===
On 28 June 2024, it was announced that Hepburn-Murphy would sign for League One club Crawley Town following the expiry of his Swindon contract. Hepburn-Murphy made his debut for the club in a 2–1 league win at home to Blackpool on 10 August, in which Hepburn-Murphy scored the opening goal.

=== Milton Keynes Dons ===
On 11 June 2025, Hepburn-Murphy joined League Two club Milton Keynes Dons for an undisclosed fee. He made his debut for the club on 2 August 2025, the opening day of the 2025–26 season, in a 0–0 home draw with Oldham Athletic. On 1 November 2025, Hepburn-Murphy scored twice in a 3–2 away FA Cup first round win over Colchester United.

At the conclusion of his first season, the club achieved promotion after finishing in second place, with Hepburn-Murphy contributing 9 goals across 38 appearances in all competitions, despite missing several weeks through injury.

== International career ==
On 29 November 2013, Hepburn-Murphy made his debut for England under-16s against Scotland, making subsequent under-17 appearances against Brazil, the United States, and Portugal.

== Career statistics ==
As of 2 May 2026

Appearances and goals by club, season and competition
Club	Season	League			National Cup		League Cup		Other		Total	
Club	Season	Division	Apps	Goals	Apps	Goals	Apps	Goals	Apps	Goals	Apps	Goals
Aston Villa	2014–15	Premier League	1	0	0	0	0	0	―		1	0
Aston Villa	2015–16	Premier League	1	0	0	0	0	0	―		1	0
Aston Villa	2016–17	Championship	3	0	0	0	0	0	―		3	0
Aston Villa	2017–18	Championship	3	0	1	0	1	0	0	0	5	0
Aston Villa	2018–19	Championship	4	0	0	0	1	0	0	0	5	0
Aston Villa	2019–20	Premier League	0	0	0	0	0	0	2 (Note: Appearance(s) in EFL Trophy)	0	2	0
Aston Villa	Total		12	0	1	0	2	0	2	0	17	0
Cambridge United (loan)	2018–19	League Two	16	2	―		―		―		16	2
Tranmere Rovers (loan)	2019–20	League One	17	4	4	0	0	0	1	1	22	5
Derby County (loan)	2019–20	Championship	0	0	0	0	0	0	0	0	0	0
Pafos	2020–21	Cypriot First Division	23	5	0	0	―		―		23	5
Pafos	2021–22	Cypriot First Division	0	0	0	0	―		―		0	0
Pafos	Total		23	5	0	0	0	0	0	0	23	5
Swindon Town	2022–23	League Two	23	5	0	0	0	0	1	1	24	6
Swindon Town	2023–24	League Two	27	5	0	0	1	1	0	0	28	6
Swindon Town	Total		50	10	0	0	1	1	1	1	52	12
Crawley Town	2024–25	League One	42	10	1	0	1	0	2	1	46	11
Milton Keynes Dons	2025–26	League Two	36	7	1	2	1	0	0	0	38	9
Milton Keynes Dons	2026–27	League One	0	0	0	0	0	0	0	0	0	0
Milton Keynes Dons	Total		36	7	1	2	1	0	0	0	38	9
Career total			196	38	7	2	5	1	6	3	214	44

== Honours ==
Aston Villa U23s

- Premier League Cup: 2017–18

Milton Keynes Dons

- EFL League Two runner-up: 2025–26
