= Konstantinos Sergiou =

Cypriot footballer

Personal information
- Full name: Konstantinos Sergiou
- Date of birth: October 2, 2000 (age 26)
- Place of birth: Avgorou, Cyprus
- Height: 1.72 m (5 ft 8 in)
- Position: Right-back

Team information
- Current team: Anorthosis
- Number: 22

Youth career
- Salamina

Senior career*
Years	Team	Apps	(Gls)
2017–2026	Salamina	151	(1)
2019–2020	→ Ayia Napa (loan)	15	(1)
2025–2026	→ Anorthosis Famagusta (loan)	22	(0)
2026–	Anorthosis Famagusta	0	(0)

International career^{‡}
2016–2017	Cyprus U17	9	(0)
2017–2019	Cyprus U19	16	(0)
2019–2022	Cyprus U21	13	(0)
2026–	Cyprus	1	(0)
- * Club domestic league appearances and goals as of 14 June 2026 ‡ National team caps and goals as of 13:00, 7 June 2026

Konstantinos Sergiou (Greek: Κωνσταντίνος Σεργίου; born 2 October 2000) is a Cypriot football player who plays as defender for Anorthosis Famagusta.

== Club career ==
=== Early years and Nea Salamina ===
Sergiou began his football journey in the youth system of Agia Napa, before transferring to the academy of Nea Salamina in 2013. Known for his versatility and defensive awareness, he progressed through the ranks and was promoted to the senior team during the 2017–18 season at the age of 17.

He gradually established himself in the first team, becoming a regular in the club's defensive line. Over the following seasons, Sergiou became recognized for his consistent performances as a right-back, combining defensive solidity with an ability to support forward play.

=== Loan to Ayia Napa ===
During the 2019–20 season, Sergiou was loaned out to Ayia Napa in the Cypriot Second Division. The move provided valuable first-team experience, and he made 15 appearances, scoring one goal. The loan period allowed him to develop tactically and gain match fitness before returning to Nea Salamina.

=== Return to Nea Salamina ===
Following his loan spell, Sergiou returned to Nea Salamina and became a regular starter. He continued to make consistent appearances for the club across multiple seasons. By mid-2025, he had accumulated over 150 league appearances and contributed one goal, becoming one of the club's most reliable defenders.

=== Loan to Anorthosis Famagusta ===
In June 2025, Sergiou joined Anorthosis Famagusta on a season-long loan deal. The move was seen as a step forward in his career, giving him the opportunity to compete at a higher level and in a more demanding environment. At the time of joining, he had yet to make an appearance for the club, but was expected to challenge for a starting role in the 2025–26 season.

== Career statistics ==
As of match played 5 May 2025

Club	Season	League			National Cup		Europe		Other		Total	
Club	Season	Division	Apps	Goals	Apps	Goals	Apps	Goals	Apps	Goals	Apps	Goals
Nea Salamina	Cypriot First Division	2016–17	1	0	0	0	—		—		1	0
Nea Salamina	Cypriot First Division	2017–18	15	0	0	0	—		—		15	0
Nea Salamina	Cypriot First Division	2018–19	4	0	0	0	—		—		4	0
Nea Salamina	Cypriot First Division	2020–21	31	0	2	0	—		—		33	0
Nea Salamina	Cypriot First Division	2021–22	24	0	1	0	—		—		1	0
Nea Salamina	Cypriot First Division	2022–23	28	1	2	0	—		—		30	1
Nea Salamina	Cypriot First Division	2023–24	35	0	1	0	—		—		36	0
Nea Salamina	Cypriot First Division	2024–25	13	0	1	0	—		—		14	0
Nea Salamina	Total		151	1	7	0	0	0	0	0	158	1
Ayia Napa (loan)	2019–20	Cypriot Second Division	15	1	–	–	—		—		15	1
Anorthosis (loan)	2025–26	Cypriot First Division	0	0	0	0	—		—		0	0
Career total			166	2	7	0	0	0	0	0	173	2
