= Leonidas Kyriakou =

Cypriot footballer (born 1998)

Personal information
- Date of birth: 24 February 1998 (age 28)
- Place of birth: Limassol, Cyprus
- Height: 1.79 m (5 ft 10 in)
- Position: Defender

Team information
- Current team: APEA Akrotiri
- Number: 72

Youth career
- –2017: Apollon Limassol

Senior career*
Years	Team	Apps	(Gls)
2017–2019	Apollon Limassol	1	(0)
2018	→ THOI Lakatamia (loan)		
2025-	APEA Akrotiri	21	(1)

International career^{‡}
2014	Cyprus U17	1	(0)
2016–2017	Cyprus U19	6	(0)
2017–2018	Cyprus U21	7	(0)
- * Club domestic league appearances and goals as of 3 May 2026 ‡ National team caps and goals as of 18:18, 7 July 2019 (UTC)

Leonidas Kyriakou (Greek: Λεωνίδας Κυριάκου; born 24 February 1998) is a Cypriot footballer who plays as a defender for APEA Akrotiri.

== Club career ==
Kyriakou made his senior debut for Apollon in the last game of the 2016–17 season, playing 70 minutes in a 2–2 draw with APOEL FC.

== Career statistics ==
=== Club ===
As of 7 July 2019.

Club	Season	League			Cup		Continental		Other		Total	
Club	Season	Division	Apps	Goals	Apps	Goals	Apps	Goals	Apps	Goals	Apps	Goals
Apollon Limassol	2016–17	Cypriot First Division	1	0	0	0	–		0	0	1	0
Apollon Limassol	2017–18	Cypriot First Division	0	0	0	0	0	0	0	0	0	0
Apollon Limassol	2018–19	Cypriot First Division	0	0	0	0	0	0	0	0	0	0
Career total			1	0	0	0	0	0	0	0	1	0
