= Víctor Álvarez (footballer) =

Spanish footballer

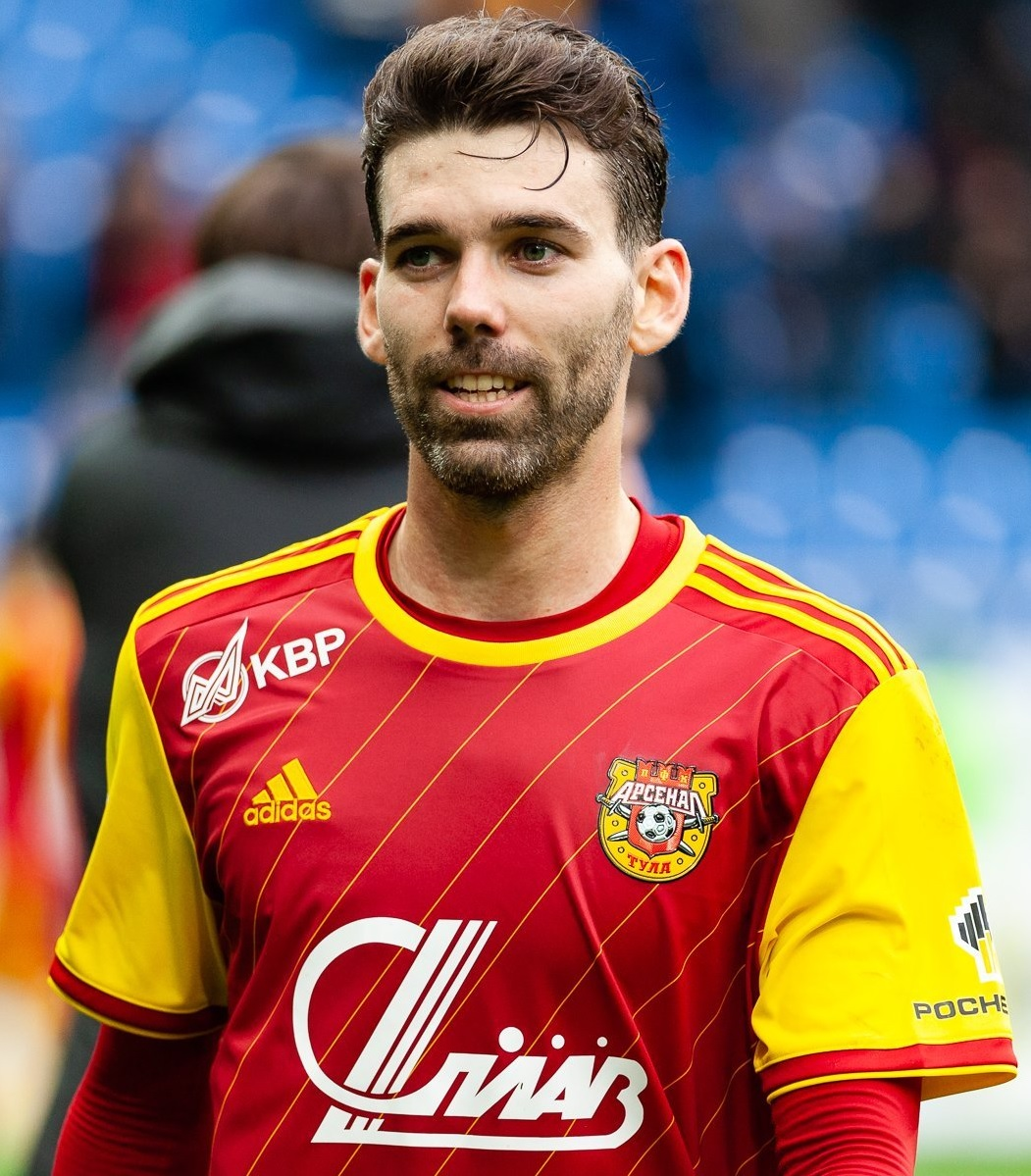
- Álvarez with Arsenal Tula in 2019

Personal information
- Full name: Víctor Guillermo Álvarez Delgado
- Date of birth: 14 March 1993 (age 33)
- Place of birth: Barcelona, Spain
- Height: 1.78 m (5 ft 10 in)
- Positions: Left-back; winger

Youth career
- 1998–2001: Santvicentí
- 2001–2007: Barcelona
- 2007–2010: Espanyol

Senior career*
| Years | Team | Apps | (Gls) |
| 2010–2012 | Espanyol B | 56 | (3) |
| 2011–2017 | Espanyol | 75 | (1) |
| 2017–2020 | Arsenal Tula | 68 | (1) |
| 2021 | Pafos | 4 | (0) |
| 2023–2024 | Deinze | 6 | (0) |
| 2024–2025 | L'Hospitalet | 17 | (1) |

International career
| 2009 | Spain U16 | 3 | (0) |
| 2009–2010 | Spain U17 | 8 | (0) |
| 2011 | Spain U18 | 2 | (0) |
| 2011 | Spain U19 | 2 | (0) |
| 2013–2016 | Catalonia | 4 | (0) |
- * Club domestic league appearances and goals as of 10:32, 11 December 2025 (UTC)

Víctor Guillermo Álvarez Delgado (Spanish pronunciation: [ˈbiɣtoɾ ˈalβaɾeθ]; born 14 March 1993) is a Spanish professional footballer. Mainly a left-back, he can also play as a left winger.

== Club career ==
=== Espanyol ===
Born in Barcelona, Catalonia, Álvarez made his senior debut aged only 17, with RCD Espanyol's reserves in the Tercera División. He first appeared in La Liga with the first team on 6 March 2011, replacing fellow youth graduate David García for the last two minutes of a 1–0 away loss to Levante UD.

On 25 March 2013, Álvarez signed a new four-year contract, being also definitely promoted to the main squad. However, he underwent surgery in late May due to a cardiovascular disease, only returning to the fields six months later in the 4–1 away win against Rayo Vallecano.

Álvarez scored his first competitive goal for Espanyol on 15 January 2014, helping to a 4–2 home victory over AD Alcorcón in the round of 16 of the Copa del Rey. His only in the league came on 22 September 2015, in a 1–0 defeat of Valencia CF also at the Estadi Cornellà-El Prat.

=== Arsenal Tula ===
On 20 July 2017, Álvarez joined Russian Premier League club FC Arsenal Tula on a two-year deal. He scored his first goal on 11 August 2019, in a 1–0 home win over FC Ufa.

Álvarez left on 31 July 2020.

=== Later career ===
On 28 January 2021, Pafos FC announced the signing of Álvarez. In August 2023, after overcoming a serious injury, he moved to Belgium with Challenger Pro League side K.M.S.K. Deinze.

Álvarez returned to both Spain and his native region on 3 September 2024, with the 31-year-old joining CE L'Hospitalet of Tercera Federación.

== Career statistics ==
As of match played 1 May 2024

| Club | Season | League | | | Cup | | Continental | | Total | |
| Club | Season | Division | Apps | Goals | Apps | Goals | Apps | Goals | Apps | Goals |
|---|---|---|---|---|---|---|---|---|---|---|
| Espanyol | 2010–11 | La Liga | 1 | 0 | 0 | 0 | – | | 1 | 0 |
| Espanyol | 2011–12 | La Liga | 0 | 0 | 1 | 0 | – | | 1 | 0 |
| Espanyol | 2012–13 | La Liga | 18 | 0 | 1 | 0 | – | | 19 | 0 |
| Espanyol | 2013–14 | La Liga | 7 | 0 | 2 | 1 | – | | 9 | 1 |
| Espanyol | 2014–15 | La Liga | 18 | 0 | 8 | 0 | – | | 26 | 0 |
| Espanyol | 2015–16 | La Liga | 27 | 1 | 2 | 0 | – | | 29 | 1 |
| Espanyol | 2016–17 | La Liga | 4 | 0 | 1 | 0 | – | | 5 | 0 |
| Espanyol | Total | | 75 | 1 | 15 | 1 | 0 | 0 | 90 | 2 |
| Espanyol B | 2012–13 | Segunda División B | 1 | 0 | – | | – | | 1 | 0 |
| Arsenal Tula | 2017–18 | Russian Premier League | 21 | 0 | 0 | 0 | – | | 21 | 0 |
| Arsenal Tula | 2018–19 | Russian Premier League | 23 | 0 | 5 | 0 | – | | 28 | 0 |
| Arsenal Tula | 2019–20 | Russian Premier League | 24 | 1 | 2 | 1 | 2 (Note: Appearances in UEFA Europa League) | 0 | 28 | 1 |
| Arsenal Tula | Total | | 68 | 1 | 7 | 1 | 2 | 0 | 77 | 2 |
| Pafos | 2020–21 | Cypriot First Division | 4 | 0 | 0 | 0 | – | | 4 | 0 |
| Deinze | 2023–24 | Challenger Pro League | 6 | 0 | 0 | 0 | – | | 6 | 0 |
| Career total | | | 154 | 2 | 22 | 1 | 2 | 0 | 178 | 3 |
