= Márcio Meira =

Portuguese footballer (born 1994)

Personal information
- Full name: Márcio André Meira Fernandes
- Date of birth: 9 January 1994 (age 32)
- Place of birth: Guimarães, Portugal
- Height: 1.69 m (5 ft 6 1/2 in)
- Position: Midfielder

Team information
- Current team: Omonia 29M
- Number: 70

Youth career
- 2002–2003: Selho
- 2003–2008: Vitória Guimarães
- 2008–2012: Vizela
- 2012–2013: Farense

Senior career*
Years	Team	Apps	(Gls)
2013-2014	11 Esperanças		
2014-2016	Lusitano VRSA	58	(4)
2016-2017	Louletano	14	(1)
2017-2019	Armacenenses	63	(12)
2019-2020	Real Massamá	18	(4)
2020-2021	Ermis Aradippou	36	(1)
2021-2024	Enosis Neon Paralimniou	64	(6)
2024-2025	Krasava Ypsonas	29	(3)
2025-	Omonia 29M	19	(3)
- * Club domestic league appearances and goals as of 3 May 2026

Márcio André Meira Fernandes (born 9 January 1994) is a Portuguese footballer who plays for Omonia 29M as a midfielder.

== Football career ==
He made his professional debut for Ermis Aradippou on 23 August 2020 in the Cypriot First Division.
