= APEA Akrotiri =

Cypriot football club

APEA FC Akrotiri
- Full name: Athlitiki Podosfairiki Enosi Akrotiriou
- Nickname: Flamingos
- Founded: 1955; 71 years ago
- Ground: Akrotiri Community Stadium
- Capacity: 1,000
- Owner: Mehdi Mohtasham
- Manager: Tasos Kyriakou
- League: Second Division
- 2025–26: Third Division, 11th of 16
- Website: https://apeafc.com/
Home colours	Away colours	Third colours

APEA FC (Greek: ΑΠΕΑ; Αθλητική Ποδοσφαιρική Ένωση Ακρωτηρίου, Athlitiki Podosfairiki Enosi Akrotiriou) is a Cypriot football club, based in Akrotiri. The club currently compete in the Cypriot Second Division after gaining promotion in the 2024/2025 Cypriot Third Division. APEA also has a U19 team that competes in the Cypriot Third Division.

== History ==
APEA FC was formed in 1955. In January 2020, the club was taken over by Dutch businessman. In May 2021, a portion of the club was purchased by an American venture capitalist Rob Steiner.

On January 15, 2022, APEA made history by being the first club from the Fourth-Tier to transfer a player to the First-Tier of Cyprus football with Nick Kaaijmolen joining PAEEK FC.

On the 10th of April 2022, APEA FC made history by being crowned champions of the STOK Elite Division after defeating 'Group B' winners AEP Polimedion in the championship game 1–0. The team were crowned champions of their group after finishing the season of 22 games, with 16 wins, 5 draws and 1 loss, scoring 63 goals along the way and only conceding 7 goals.

2022-2023 Season

APEA concluded the first round of games in 5th place, qualifying for the top 8 promotion group, only 1 point from promotion places with 8 wins, 5 losses, and 2 draws. They concluded the promotion round in 4th place missing the promotion spot by 1 place, with 6 wins, 7 losses, and a draw.

2024-25 Season

In the 2024-25 season APEA gained Promotion to the Second Division and won the Cypriot Third and Fourth Division Cup.

== Players ==
=== Current squad ===
As of 15 September 2026

Note: Flags indicate national team as defined under FIFA eligibility rules; some limited exceptions apply. Players may hold more than one non-FIFA nationality.

No.	Pos.	Nation	Player
1	GK	CYP	Anastasios Pisiias
2	DF	CYP	Christos Efstathiou
3	DF	CYP	Stylianos Stylianou
5	DF	CYP	Pavlos Nearchou
6	MF	CYP	Constantinos Marneros
7	FW	CYP	Andreas Komodikis
8	DF	ENG	Oliver Robinson
9	FW	SDN	Mohamed Adam
10	FW	CYP	Suleyman Sohna Andreou
11	FW	CYP	Michalis Christodoulou
13	DF	CPV	Delmiro
14	MF	CYP	Christos Sergiou
16	DF	CYP	Rafael Kourtellos
17	DF	CMR	Ismael Yandal
19	FW	CYP	Alexandros Antreou

No.	Pos.	Nation	Player
20	DF	CYP	Antonis Psichas
23	MF	CYP	Konstantinos Louvaris
24	DF	FRA	Mathis Philippe
30	FW	GRE	Georgios Stamoulis
35	FW	POR	Tiago Lopes
44	FW	ENG	Joshua Jewell
59	MF	CYP	Dimitris Moustakas
60	MF	CYP	Michalis Skordis
70	FW	CYP	Adonis Nikolettidis
72	DF	CYP	Leonidas Kyriakou
77	GK	CYP	Stylianos Konstantinou
82	MF	CYP	Marios Avgousti
83	GK	CYP	Dimitris Kasoulidis
89	MF	POR	Edu Barradas

== See also ==
- APEA Akrotiri U19
