= Juan Camilo Saiz =

Colombian footballer (born 1992)

Personal information
- Full name: Juan Camilo Saiz Ortegón
- Date of birth: 1 March 1992 (age 34)
- Place of birth: El Espinal, Colombia
- Height: 1.87 m (6 ft 1 1/2 in)
- Position: Centre-back

Team information
- Current team: 2 de Mayo
- Number: 28

Youth career
- Envigado

Senior career*
Years	Team	Apps	(Gls)
2009–2015	Envigado	54	(1)
2010	→ Argentinos Juniors (loan)	0	(0)
2015–2021	Independiente Medellín	37	(0)
2017–2018	→ Argentinos Juniors (loan)	11	(0)
2018–2020	→ Cerro Porteño (loan)	25	(0)
2020–2021	→ Pafos (loan)	36	(2)
2022	Riga	7	(0)
2022	Doxa Katokopias	11	(0)
2022	Deportes Tolima	3	(0)
2023	Cúcuta Deportivo	0	(0)
2023–2024	Peyia 2014	16	(0)
2024	Arsenal de Sarandí	3	(0)
2024–2025	AEZ Zakakiou	27	(1)
2025–	2 de Mayo	1	(0)

International career
2009	Colombia U17	7	(0)
2011	Colombia U20	7	(0)
- * Club domestic league appearances and goals as of 13 August 2025

Juan Camilo Saiz Ortegón (born 1 March 1992) is a Colombian professional footballer who currently plays as a centre-back for Paraguayan club 2 de Mayo.

== Club career ==
Envigado were Saiz's first club, he spent time in the team's youth system prior to making his professional debut in August 2009 against La Equidad in a 2–2 draw. After two further league appearances for Envigado, Saiz departed Colombian football on a temporary basis to join Argentine Primera División side Argentinos Juniors on loan. He returned to Envigado six months later without featuring. He went onto make thirty-three more appearances for Envigado. He scored the first goal of his career on 30 July 2014 in a Copa Colombia draw with Atlético Nacional.

Saiz completed a transfer to fellow Colombian top-flight team Independiente Medellín in July 2015. He eventually made his debut in December, coming on for the final minutes in the club's 1–0 league victory versus Atlético Nacional. Forty-five appearances followed in the next three seasons for Saiz. In August 2017, Saiz rejoined Argentinos Juniors on loan. He made his club debut on 24 September 2017 in a 1–1 draw against River Plate. Cerro Porteño of the Paraguayan Primera División secured a loan deal for Saiz in July 2018. He ended up remaining until June 2020, making thirty-one appearances.

On 22 August 2020, Saiz headed to Europe to join Cypriot First Division side Pafos on loan. He made his debut for the club on 28 August against Anorthosis Famagusta, prior to scoring his first goal in a 2–2 draw with Ethnikos Achna on 19 September.

== International career ==
Saiz represented Colombia at U17 and U20 level. He played in seven matches for the U17s at the 2009 FIFA U-17 World Cup in Nigeria as the team finished fourth. He also featured seven times for the U20s at the 2011 South American U-20 Championship in Peru.

== Career statistics ==
As of 7 June 2021.

Appearances and goals by club, season and competition
Club	Season	League			Cup		League Cup		Continental		Other		Total	
Club	Season	Division	Apps	Goals	Apps	Goals	Apps	Goals	Apps	Goals	Apps	Goals	Apps	Goals
Envigado	2009	Categoría Primera A	2	0	0	0	—		—		0	0	2	0
Envigado	2010	Categoría Primera A	1	0	0	0	—		—		0	0	1	0
Envigado	2011	Categoría Primera A	4	0	0	0	—		—		0	0	4	0
Envigado	2012	Categoría Primera A	0	0	4	0	—		0	0	0	0	4	0
Envigado	2013	Categoría Primera A	7	0	10	0	—		—		0	0	17	0
Envigado	2014	Categoría Primera A	21	0	2	1	—		—		1 (Note: Appearance(s) in the Categoría Primera A play-offs)	0	24	1
Envigado	2015	Categoría Primera A	19	1	2	0	—		—		0	0	21	1
Envigado	Total		54	1	18	1	—		0	0	1	0	73	2
Argentinos Juniors (loan)	2010–11	Argentine Primera División	0	0	0	0	—		0	0	0	0	0	0
Independiente Medellín	2015	Categoría Primera A	0	0	0	0	—		—		1	0	1	0
Independiente Medellín	2016	Categoría Primera A	27	0	4	0	—		4 (Note: Appearance(s) in the Copa Sudamericana)	0	6	0	41	0
Independiente Medellín	2017	Categoría Primera A	10	0	0	0	—		7 (Note: Appearance(s) in the Copa Libertadores and Copa Sudamericana)	0	2	0	19	0
Independiente Medellín	2018	Categoría Primera A	0	0	0	0	—		0	0	0	0	0	0
Independiente Medellín	2019	Categoría Primera A	0	0	0	0	—		0	0	0	0	0	0
Independiente Medellín	2020	Categoría Primera A	0	0	0	0	—		0	0	0	0	0	0
Independiente Medellín	Total		37	0	4	0	—		11	0	9	0	61	0
Argentinos Juniors (loan)	2017–18	Argentine Primera División	11	0	1	0	—		—		0	0	12	0
Cerro Porteño (loan)	2018	Paraguayan Primera División	2	0	0	0	—		0	0	0	0	2	0
Cerro Porteño (loan)	2019	Paraguayan Primera División	19	0	0	0	—		5 (Note: Appearance(s) in the Copa Libertadores)	0	0	0	24	0
Cerro Porteño (loan)	2020	Paraguayan Primera División	4	0	0	0	—		1	0	0	0	5	0
Cerro Porteño (loan)	Total		25	0	0	0	—		6	0	0	0	31	0
Pafos (loan)	2020–21	First Division	36	2	1	0	—		—		—		37	2
Career total			163	3	24	1	—		17	0	10	0	214	4

== Honours ==
Independiente Medellín

- Categoría Primera A: 2016 Apertura
