= Joaquín Varela (footballer, born 1998) =

Uruguayan footballer

Personal information
- Full name: Joaquín Varela Moreno
- Date of birth: 27 June 1998 (age 28)
- Place of birth: Montevideo, Uruguay
- Height: 1.90 m (6 ft 3 in)
- Position: Centre-back

Team information
- Current team: Deportivo Cali
- Number: 5

Youth career
- 2011–2016: Defensor Sporting

Senior career*
Years	Team	Apps	(Gls)
2016–2019	Defensor Sporting	1	(0)
2017	→ Pachuca (loan)	0	(0)
2018	→ Villa Española (loan)	18	(2)
2019–2021	Fénix	11	(0)
2019–2021	→ Pafos (loan)	9	(0)
2021–2023	Deportivo Maldonado	49	(2)
2023	Instituto	6	(2)
2023	→ Independiente Medellín (loan)	23	(3)
2024–2025	Águilas Doradas	10	(1)
2024–2025	→ Independiente Medellín (loan)	5	(0)
2025–	Deportivo Cali	20	(0)

International career
2015	Uruguay U17	8	(0)
- * Club domestic league appearances and goals as of 12 December 2025

Joaquín Varela Moreno (born 27 June 1998) is a Uruguayan professional footballer who plays as a defender as centre-back for Deportivo Cali.

== Club career ==
Varela started his career with Defensor Sporting. He was selected for his professional debut in February 2016 by manager Juan Tejera, who played him for the full duration of a home defeat to Racing Club. Liga MX team Pachuca loaned Varela in 2017, with the defender joining up with the U20 team. He made nine appearances for Pachuca's youth team, prior to returning to Defensor Sporting. On 1 March 2018, Villa Española of the Uruguayan Segunda División completed the loan signing of Varela. He scored his first senior goal on 2 June against Albion, though he received a straight red card later in the match.

In 2019, Varela joined Fénix. In the following September, Varela departed on loan to European football with Cypriot First Division side Pafos. He didn't appear competitively in 2019–20 due to injury, though was on the substitute's bench for a league match with Apollon Limassol on 14 September. Despite this, the club renewed his loan for a further year ahead of the 2020–21 campaign. He debuted in a goalless draw away to Enosis Neon Paralimni on 23 November.

== International career ==
Varela represented Uruguay at the 2015 South American U-17 Championship in Paraguay, winning eight caps in the process; notably his first in their Group B opener with Bolivia.

== Career statistics ==
As of 17 December 2020.

Club statistics
Club	Season	League			Cup		Continental		Other		Total	
Club	Season	Division	Apps	Goals	Apps	Goals	Apps	Goals	Apps	Goals	Apps	Goals
Defensor Sporting	2015–16	Primera División	1	0	—		0	0	0	0	1	0
Defensor Sporting	2016	Primera División	0	0	—		—		0	0	0	0
Defensor Sporting	2017	Primera División	0	0	—		0	0	0	0	0	0
Defensor Sporting	2018	Primera División	0	0	—		0	0	0	0	0	0
Defensor Sporting	Total		1	0	—		0	0	0	0	1	0
Pachuca (loan)	2016–17	Liga MX	0	0	0	0	0	0	0	0	0	0
Villa Española (loan)	2018	Segunda División	18	2	—		—		0	0	18	2
Fénix	2019	Primera División	11	1	—		—		0	0	11	1
Fénix	2020	Primera División	0	0	—		0	0	0	0	0	0
Fénix	Total		11	1	0	0	0	0	0	0	11	1
Pafos (loan)	2019–20	First Division	0	0	0	0	—		0	0	0	0
Pafos (loan)	2020–21	First Division	5	0	0	0	—		0	0	5	0
Pafos (loan)	Total		5	0	0	0	—		0	0	5	0
Career total			35	3	0	0	0	0	0	0	35	3
