= Giorgos Papageorgiou =

Cypriot footballer

Personal information
- Full name: Georgios Papageorgiou
- Date of birth: 7 June 1997 (age 29)
- Place of birth: Xylotymbou, Larnaca, Cyprus
- Height: 1.75 m (5 ft 9 in)
- Position: Midfielder

Team information
- Current team: AEL Limassol
- Number: 30

Youth career
- Ethnikos Achna

Senior career*
Years	Team	Apps	(Gls)
2016–2021	Ethnikos Achna	88	(6)
2021–2023	Apollon Smyrnis	38	(1)
2023–2025	Nea Salamina	38	(5)
2025–2026	Ethnikos Achna	32	(1)
2026–	AEL Limassol	8	(0)

International career^{‡}
2017–2018	Cyprus U21	7	(2)
- * Club domestic league appearances and goals as of 7 November 2026 ‡ National team caps and goals as of 16 October 2018

Giorgos Papageorgiou (Greek: Γιώργος Παπαγεωργίου; born 7 June 1997) is a Cypriot professional footballer who plays as a midfielder for Cypriot First Division club AEL Limassol.

== Career ==
=== Apollon Smyrnis ===
On 23 June 2021, Papageorgiou moved to the Superleague Greece, signing a contract with Apollon Smyrnis on a free transfer.

== Career statistics ==
As of 12 June 2023

Club	Season	League			Cup		Continental		Other		Total	
Club	Season	Division	Apps	Goals	Apps	Goals	Apps	Goals	Apps	Goals	Apps	Goals
Ethnikos Achna	2016–17	Cypriot First Division	15	0	0	0	—		—		15	0
Ethnikos Achna	2017–18	Cypriot First Division	21	2	0	0	—		—		21	2
Ethnikos Achna	2018–19	Cypriot First Division	0	0	1	0	—		—		1	0
Ethnikos Achna	2019–20	Cypriot First Division	17	0	4	0	—		—		21	0
Ethnikos Achna	2020–21	Cypriot First Division	35	4	1	0	—		—		36	4
Ethnikos Achna	Subtotal		88	6	6	0	—		—		94	6
Apollon Smyrnis	2021–22	Super League 1	15	0	1	0	—		—		16	0
Apollon Smyrnis	2022–23	Super League 2	23	1	1	0	—		—		24	1
Apollon Smyrnis	Subtotal		38	1	2	0	—		—		40	1
Career total			126	7	8	0	0	0	0	0	134	7
