= Christoforos Loizou =

Cypriot footballer (born 1969)

Personal information
- Date of birth: 10 September 1969 (age 57)
- Place of birth: Nicosia, Cyprus
- Height: 1.90 m (6 ft 3 in)
- Position: Goalkeeper

Team information
- Current team: Omonia (goalkeeping coach)

Senior career*
Years	Team	Apps	(Gls)
1985–1992	Omonia	?	(0)
1992–1999	Olympiakos Nicosia	?	(0)

Managerial career
- 1999–2006: Olympiakos Nicosia (goalkeeping coach)
- 2006–2012: Omonia (goalkeeping coach)
- 2012–2013: Cyprus (goalkeeping coach)
- 2013–2016: Omonia (goalkeeping coach)
- 2016–: Cyprus U21 (goalkeeping coach)
- * Club domestic league appearances and goals

Christoforos Loizou (Greek: Χριστόφορος Λοϊζου; born 10 September 1969) is a Cypriot former footballer who played as a goalkeeper. He went on to work as a goalkeeping coach.

Loizou played for Omonia from 1985 to 1992, and finished his playing career with Olympiakos Nicosia. He began his coaching career with that club before returning to Omonia, also as goalkeeping coach, in 2006. He remained for nine years in total, in two spells either side of a season working with the Cyprus national team. He left Omonia in June 2016 and took up the post of goalkeeping coach with the Cyprus under-21 team later that year.
