= Marcelo Torres =

Argentine footballer

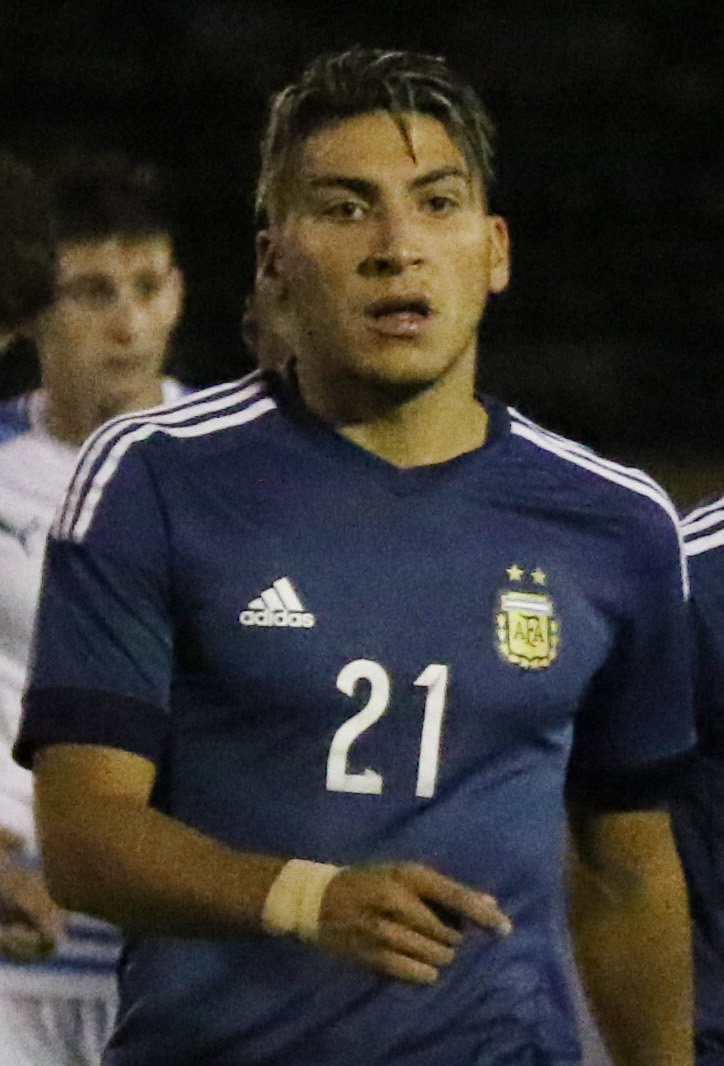
- Marcelo Torres Torres with Argentina U20 in 2023

Personal information
- Full name: Luis Marcelo Torres
- Date of birth: 6 November 1997 (age 29)
- Place of birth: Temperley, Argentina
- Height: 1.80 m (5 ft 11 in)
- Position: Forward

Team information
- Current team: Gimnasia LP
- Number: 32

Youth career
- Boca Juniors
- 2012–2017: San Lorenzo

Senior career*
Years	Team	Apps	(Gls)
2017–2020	Boca Juniors	0	(0)
2017–2018	→ Talleres Córdoba (loan)	13	(3)
2018–2019	→ Banfield (loan)	10	(1)
2019–2020	→ Pafos (loan)	5	(2)
2020–2023	Pafos	30	(7)
2022	→ Akritas Chlorakas (loan)	7	(7)
2022	→ Riga (loan)	16	(11)
2023	→ Akritas Chlorakas (loan)	20	(7)
2023–2025	Dubai United	23	(33)
2025–	Gimnasia LP	37	(14)

International career^{‡}
2017	Argentina U20	10	(7)
- * Club domestic league appearances and goals as of 17:32, 9 July 2026 (UTC) ‡ National team caps and goals as of 1 October 2017

Luis Marcelo "Chelo" Torres (born 6 November 1997) is an Argentine professional footballer who plays as a forward for Gimnasia LP.

== Club career ==
=== Boca Juniors ===
A graduate of the Boca Juniors football academy, having joined the club in 2012, Torres signed his first professional contract in December 2016, aged 19. Earlier in the month, he had led Boca's reserve side to victory in the Superclásico, scoring twice in a 2–0 win over River Plate. He ended the season as the reserve league's top goalscorer, with 14 goals.

==== Loans to Talleres Córdoba & Banfield ====
In August 2017, Torres joined fellow Primera División side Talleres Córdoba, signing on a season-long loan with the club retaining the option of purchase. He made a goalscoring debut for the club on 26 August, coming off the bench to score in a 5–2 league win over Lanús. His time at the club was marred by injury, however, and at the end of the season he left to join Banfield on a further loan.

=== Pafos and loans ===
On 21 August 2019, Pafos announced the loan signing of Torres. Then, on 13 September 2020, Pafos announced the permanent signing of Torres. On 9 January 2022 he joined Akritas Chlorakas on loan until the end of the season. On 17 June, Riga announced the loan of Torres until the end of the season. On 24 January 2023, Akritas Chlorakas announced the return of Torres on loan until the end of the season.

=== Later career ===
On 5 September 2023, Torres joined UAE club Dubai United, signing a two-year contract. On 6 July 2025, Torres joined Gimnasia La Plata on a free transfer.

== International career ==
=== Argentina national youth teams ===
Torres made his international debut for Argentina at youth level in 2017 and represented his nation at the 2017 South American Youth Championship, ending as the tournament's joint-top scorer with five goals in seven appearances. Later that year, he took part in the FIFA U-20 World Cup and scored twice before Argentina were eliminated from the group stages.

== Career statistics ==
=== Club ===
As of 3 March 2026

Appearances and goals by club, season and competition
Club	Season	League			Cup (Note: Includes Copa Argentina, Cypriot Cup, UAE President's Cup)		League Cup (Note: Includes Copa de la Superliga)		Continental (Note: Includes Copa Sudamericana and UEFA Conference League)		Total	
Club	Season	League	Apps	Goals	Apps	Goals	Apps	Goals	Apps	Goals	Apps	Goals
Boca Juniors	2016–17	Primera División	0	0	0	0	0	0	0	0	0	0
Talleres Córdoba (loan)	2017–18	Primera División	13	3	1	0	0	0	0	0	14	3
Banfield (loan)	2018–19	Primera División	10	1	0	0	1	0	3	0	13	1
Pafos (loan)	2019–20	Cypriot First Division	5	2	1	0	—		—		6	2
Pafos	2020–21	Cypriot First Division	30	7	0	0	—		—		30	7
Pafos	Total		35	9	1	0	0	0	0	0	36	9
Akritas Chlorakas (loan)	2021–22	Cypriot Second Division	7	7	0	0	—		—		7	7
Riga (loan)	2022	Latvian Higher League	16	11	0	0	—		4	1	20	12
Akritas Chlorakas (loan)	2022–23	Cypriot First Division	20	7	0	0	—		—		20	7
Dubai United	2023–24	UAE First Division League	17	26	1	0	—		—		18	26
Dubai United	2024–25	UAE First Division League	6	7	2	1	—		—		8	8
Dubai United	Total		23	33	3	1	0	0	0	0	26	34
Gimnasia LP	2025	Primera División	19	7	0	0	—		—		19	7
Gimnasia LP	2026	Primera División	8	3	0	0	—		—		8	3
Gimnasia LP	Total		27	10	0	0	0	0	0	0	27	10
Career total			151	81	5	1	1	0	7	1	164	83
