= Theodoros Iosifidis =

Cypriot footballer (born 1997)

Personal information
- Full name: Theodoros Iosifidis
- Date of birth: 17 January 1997 (age 29)
- Place of birth: Limassol, Cyprus
- Height: 1.81 m (5 ft 11 in)
- Position: Forward

Team information
- Current team: AEZ Zakakiou
- Number: 7

Senior career*
Years	Team	Apps	(Gls)
2018–2019	Móstoles	40	(11)
2019–2020	Extremadura B	12	(7)
2020–2021	Ejea	7	(1)
2021	Sant Rafel	17	(5)
2021–2023	Aris Limassol	9	(1)
2022	→ Doxa Katokopias (loan)	6	(0)
2023	→ Omonia 29M (loan)	6	(0)
2023–2024	AEZ Zakakiou	22	(1)
2024–25	Krasava Ypsonas	10	(1)
2025-	AEZ Zakakiou	27	(7)
- * Club domestic league appearances and goals as of 3 May 2026

Theodoros Iosifidis (Greek: Θεόδωρος Ιωσηφίδης; born 17 January 1997) is a Cypriot footballer who plays as a centre-forward for AEZ Zakakiou in the Cypriot Second Division.
