= 2018–19 Pafos FC season =

Pafos
2018–19 season
- Owner: Roman Dubov
- Manager: Steven Pressley (until 9 October); Željko Kopić (from 19 October)
- Stadium: Stelios Kyriakides Stadium
- Cyta Championship: 8th
- Cypriot Cup: Quarterfinal vs Enosis Neon Paralimni
- Top goalscorer: League: Adam Nemec (16); All: Adam Nemec (19)
Home colours	Away colours

The 2018–19 season was Pafos's 5th year in existence, and second season in the Cypriot First Division.

== Season review ==
In June, Pafos announced the signings of former Dundee defender Kevin Holt, and Evgenios Petrou from Ethnikos Assia.

In July, Pafos sign goalkeeper Joël Mall, defenders Lorran, Andreas Panayiotou, Radek Dejmek and Henrique, and midfielders Jens Cools and Zdeněk Folprecht.

In August, Matija Širok, Lulinha, Kostas Giannoulis, Federico Rasic, Diego Živulić, Pavel Lelyukhin and Adam Nemec all signed for Pafos. Whilst Andreas Karo and Luca Polizzi joined on loan from Apollon Limassol for the season, Patrick Banggaard from Darmstadt 98 and Brayan Angulo from América de Cali on similar loan deals.

Pafos finished off their summer signings in September by signing Simo Choukoud, Jander from Apollon Limassol and Giannis Angelopoulos from Olympiacos.

On 11 December, Deniss Rakels returned to Pafos following his loan spell at Riga.

On 22 January, Radek Dejmek left Pafos to join GKS Katowice.

On 1 February, Pafos announced the signing of Abdisalam Ibrahim after he'd left Vålerenga, and the signing of Artūrs Karašausks from FK RFS.

On 26 February, Kévin Bérigaud was sent on loan to Riga.

== Transfers ==
=== In ===
Date	Position	Nationality	Name	From	Fee	Ref.
1 July 2018	GK	(Cyprus)	Evgenios Petrou	Ethnikos Assia	Undisclosed	
1 July 2018	DF	(Scotland)	Kevin Holt	Dundee	Free	
4 July 2018	DF	(Cyprus)	Andreas Panayiotou	AC Omonia	Undisclosed	
9 July 2018	DF	(Cyprus)	Sotiris Zantis	Apollon Limassol	Undisclosed	
10 July 2018	MF	(Czech Republic)	Zdeněk Folprecht	Slovan Liberec	Undisclosed	
11 July 2018	DF	(Czech Republic)	Radek Dejmek	Korona Kielce	Undisclosed	
15 July 2018	DF	(Brazil)	Lorran	Santo André	Undisclosed	
16 July 2018	FW	(Latvia)	Deniss Rakels	Reading	Free	
21 July 2018	DF	(Portugal)	Henrique	Boavista	Undisclosed	
22 July 2018	MF	(Belgium)	Jens Cools	Waasland-Beveren	Undisclosed	
31 July 2018	GK	(Switzerland)	Joël Mall	Darmstadt 98	Undisclosed	
10 August 2018	DF	(Slovenia)	Matija Širok	Domžale	Undisclosed	
13 August 2018	DF	(Greece)	Kostas Giannoulis	Asteras Tripolis	Undisclosed	
22 August 2018	FW	(Argentina)	Federico Rasic	Arsenal Tula	Undisclosed	
27 August 2018	FW	(Slovakia)	Adam Nemec	Dinamo București	Undisclosed	
30 August 2018	DF	(Russia)	Pavel Lelyukhin	Dynamo Moscow	Undisclosed	
30 August 2018	MF	(Brazil)	Lulinha	Sharjah	Undisclosed	
30 August 2018	MF	(Croatia)	Diego Živulić	Viktoria Plzeň	Undisclosed	
2 September 2018	MF	(Netherlands)	Simo Choukoud	Feyenoord	Free	
5 September 2018	GK	(Greece)	Giannis Angelopoulos	Olympiacos	Undisclosed	
7 September 2018	DF	(Brazil)	Jander	Apollon Limassol	Undisclosed	
1 February 2019	MF	(Norway)	Abdisalam Ibrahim	Vålerenga	Undisclosed	
1 February 2019	FW	(Latvia)	Artūrs Karašausks	FK RFS	Undisclosed	

=== Loans in ===
Start date	Position	Nationality	Name	From	End date	Ref.
10 August 2018	DF	(Denmark)	Patrick Banggaard	Darmstadt 98	30 June 2019	
14 August 2018	DF	(Cyprus)	Andreas Karo	Apollon Limassol	30 June 2019	
17 August 2018	MF	(Belgium)	Luca Polizzi	Apollon Limassol	30 June 2019	
25 August 2018	MF	(Colombia)	Brayan Angulo	América de Cali	30 June 2019	

=== Out ===
Date	Position	Nationality	Name	To	Fee	Ref.
22 January 2019	DF	(Czech Republic)	Radek Dejmek	GKS Katowice	Undisclosed	

=== Loans out ===
Start date	Position	Nationality	Name	To	End date	Ref.
17 July 2018	FW	(Latvia)	Deniss Rakels	Riga	11 December 2018	
8 February 2019	FW	(Latvia)	Artūrs Karašausks	Riga	31 December 2019	
26 February 2019	FW	(France)	Kévin Bérigaud	Riga	30 June 2019	

=== Released ===
Date	Position	Nationality	Name	Joined	Date	Ref
5 September 2018	DF	(Greece)	Kostas Giannoulis	OFI Crete	1 January 2019	
12 September 2018	DF	(Portugal)	Henrique	L.F.C. Lourosa	26 October 2018	
30 June 2019	GK	(Greece)	Giannis Angelopoulos	Levadiakos	9 January 2020	
30 June 2019	GK	(Slovenia)	Jan Koprivec	Kilmarnock	10 September 2019	
30 June 2019	GK	(Switzerland)	Joël Mall	Apollon Limassol	1 July 2019	
30 June 2018	DF	(Brazil)	Lorran	Serra Macaense	8 August 2019	
30 June 2019	DF	(Cyprus)	Sotiris Zantis	Karmiotissa	28 August 2019	
30 June 2019	DF	(Russia)	Aleksandr Dovbnya	Arsenal Tula	16 July 2019	
30 June 2019	DF	(Scotland)	Kevin Holt	Queen of the South	1 July 2019	
30 June 2019	MF	(Croatia)	Diego Živulić	Śląsk Wrocław	3 August 2019	
30 June 2019	MF	(Netherlands)	Simo Choukoud			

== Squad ==
As of match played 17 May 2019

No.	Name	Nationality	Position	Date of birth (age)	Signed from	Signed in	Contract ends	Apps.	Goals
Goalkeepers
1	Joël Mall	(Switzerland)	GK	5 April 1991 (aged 28)	Darmstadt 98	2018		32	0
12	Evgenios Petrou	(Cyprus)	GK	6 September 1997 (aged 21)	Ethnikos Assia	2018		4	0
88	Jan Koprivec	(Slovenia)	GK	15 July 1988 (aged 30)	Anorthosis Famagusta	2017			
98	Giannis Angelopoulos	(Greece)	GK	3 April 1998 (aged 21)	Olympiacos	2018		1	0
Defenders
2	Andreas Karo	(Cyprus)	DF	9 September 1996 (aged 22)	loan from Apollon Limassol	2018	2019	24	3
3	Kevin Holt	(Scotland)	DF	25 January 1993 (aged 26)	Dundee	2018		28	0
6	Lorran	(Brazil)	DF	8 January 1996 (aged 23)	Santo André	2018		8	0
8	Matija Širok	(Slovenia)	DF	31 May 1991 (aged 27)	Domžale	2018		33	0
15	Kyriakos Antoniou	(Cyprus)	DF	3 May 2001 (aged 18)	Academy	2018		3	0
21	Jander	(Brazil)	DF	8 July 1988 (aged 30)	Apollon Limassol	2018		21	0
22	Andreas Panayiotou	(Cyprus)	DF	31 May 1995 (aged 23)	AC Omonia	2018		23	1
26	Patrick Banggaard	(Denmark)	DF	4 April 1994 (aged 25)	loan from Darmstadt 98	2018	2019	34	0
47	Sotiris Zantis	(Cyprus)	DF	24 January 2001 (aged 18)	Apollon Limassol	2018		2	0
66	Pavel Lelyukhin	(Russia)	DF	23 April 1998 (aged 21)	Dynamo Moscow	2018		11	0
90	Aleksandr Dovbnya	(Russia)	DF	14 February 1996 (aged 23)	Ethnikos Achna	2018		17	1
Midfielders
10	Lulinha	(Brazil)	MF	10 April 1990 (aged 29)	Sharjah	2018		22	1
16	Abdisalam Ibrahim	(Norway)	MF	1 May 1991 (aged 28)	Vålerenga	2019		9	0
24	Jens Cools	(Belgium)	MF	16 October 1990 (aged 28)	Waasland-Beveren	2018		28	7
25	Zdeněk Folprecht	(Czech Republic)	MF	7 January 1991 (aged 28)	Slovan Liberec	2018		34	1
40	Ektoras Stefanou	(Netherlands)	MF	12 April 2001 (aged 18)	AEK Larnaca	2018		1	0
44	Diego Živulić	(Croatia)	MF	23 March 1992 (aged 27)	Viktoria Plzeň	2018		31	0
53	Simo Choukoud	(Netherlands)	MF	1 January 1999 (aged 20)	Feyenoord	2018		2	0
70	Brayan Angulo	(Colombia)	MF	19 July 1993 (aged 25)	loan from América de Cali	2018	2019	34	10
96	Luca Polizzi	(Belgium)	MF	28 May 1996 (aged 22)	loan from Apollon Limassol	2018	2019	10	0
Forwards
11	Panagiotis Zachariou	(Cyprus)	FW	26 February 1996 (aged 23)	AE Pafos	2014			
19	Federico Rasic	(Argentina)	FW	24 March 1992 (aged 27)	Arsenal Tula	2018		32	8
77	Adam Nemec	(Slovakia)	FW	2 September 1985 (aged 33)	Dinamo București	2018		33	19
92	Deniss Rakels	(Latvia)	FW	20 August 1992 (aged 26)	Reading	2018		21	1
Out on loan
74	Kévin Bérigaud	(France)	FW	9 May 1988 (aged 31)	Montpellier	2018			
	Artūrs Karašausks	(Latvia)	FW	29 January 1992 (aged 27)	FK RFS	2019		0	0
Left during the season
18	Kostas Giannoulis	(Greece)	DF	9 December 1987 (aged 31)	Asteras Tripolis	2018		1	0
32	Radek Dejmek	(Czech Republic)	DF	2 February 1988 (aged 31)	Korona Kielce	2018		4	0
	Henrique	(Portugal)	DF	19 October 1986 (aged 32)	Boavista	2018		0	0

=== Out on loan ===
Note: Flags indicate national team as defined under FIFA eligibility rules; some limited exceptions apply. Players may hold more than one non-FIFA nationality.

No. / Pos. / Nation / Player; 74 / FW / FRA / Kévin Bérigaud (at Riga)	No. / Pos. / Nation / Player; — / FW / LVA / Artūrs Karašausks (at Riga)

=== Left club during season ===
Note: Flags indicate national team as defined under FIFA eligibility rules; some limited exceptions apply. Players may hold more than one non-FIFA nationality.

No. / Pos. / Nation / Player; 18 / DF / GRE / Kostas Giannoulis (at OFI Crete)	No. / Pos. / Nation / Player; 32 / DF / CZE / Radek Dejmek (at GKS Katowice)

== Friendlies ==
	–
EEST (UTC+3)

== Competitions ==
=== Overview ===
Competition	First match	Last match	Starting round	Final position	Record							
Competition	First match	Last match	Starting round	Final position	Pld	W	D	L	GF	GA	GD	Win %
Cyta Championship	1 September 2018	17 May 2019	Matchday 1	8th	32	12	8	12	39	50	−11	37.50
Cypriot Cup	5 December 2018	27 February 2019	First round	Quarterfinal	5	2	2	1	13	6	+7	40.00
Total					37	14	10	13	52	56	−4	37.84

Last updated: 17 May 2019
Source: Competitions

=== Cyta Championship ===
==== Regular season ====
===== League table =====
Pos	Team	Pld	W	D	L	GF	GA	GD	Pts	Qualification or relegation
6	Nea Salamis Famagusta	22	9	4	9	28	30	−2	31 (Note: Head to head record: Omonia 3–1 Nea Salamis, Nea Salamis 1–0 Omonia.)	Qualification for the Championship round
7	Anorthosis Famagusta (Note: Anorthosis were deducted six points for use of unregistered player on a game against Apollon on 2 February 2019.)	22	9	7	6	27	26	+1	28	Qualification for the Relegation round
8	Pafos FC (Note: Pafos FC were deducted six points for use of unregistered player on a game against AEK Larnaca on 2 January 2019.)	22	7	6	9	24	36	−12	21	Qualification for the Relegation round
9	Doxa Katokopias	22	5	5	12	28	39	−11	20	Qualification for the Relegation round
10	Enosis Neon Paralimni	22	4	5	13	17	38	−21	17 (Note: Head to head record: Paralimni 2–0 Alki, Alki 1–2 Paralimni.)	Qualification for the Relegation round

Source: Cyprus Football Association, Soccerway
Rules for classification: 1) Points; 2) Head-to-head points; 3) Head-to-head goal difference; 4) Head-to-head goals scored; 5) Head-to-head away goals scored (only if two teams); 6) Goal difference; 7) Goals scored; 8) Play-off (only if deciding championship round, relegation round or relegation).

===== Results summary =====
Overall								Home						Away					
Pld	W	D	L	GF	GA	GD	Pts	W	D	L	GF	GA	GD	W	D	L	GF	GA	GD
22	7	6	9	24	36	−12	27	5	3	3	9	9	0	2	3	6	15	27	−12

Last updated: 23 February 2019.
Source: Results

===== Results by results =====
Matchday	1	2	3	4	5	6	7	8	9	10	11	12	13	14	15	16	17	18	19	20	21	22
Ground	H	A	H	A	H	A	H	A	H	A	H	A	H	A	A	H	A	H	A	H	A	H
Result	D	L	L	L	L	W	D	L	W	L	W	D	D	L	L	L	D	W	W	W	D	W
Position	9	6	10	11	11	12	9	10	11	9	10	9	9	9	11	12	12	11	11	9	9	8

Updated to match(es) played on 29 February 2020. Source: Results
A = Away; H = Home; W = Win; D = Draw; L = Loss; P = Postponed

===== Results =====
1 September 2018 1	Pafos	1–1	Anorthosis Famagusta	Paphos
20:00 EEST (UTC+3)	Banggaard (yellow card) 25'; Bérigaud (yellow card) 42'; Angulo 81'	Report	Rayos 20'; Schildenfeld (yellow card) 45+3'; Kacharava (yellow card) 86'	Stadium: Stelios Kyriakides Stadium; Referee: Leontios Trattos

15 September 2018 2	Apollon Limassol	5–1	Pafos	Limassol
19:00 EEST (UTC+3)	Yuste 7', 60'; Pereyra 11'; Kyriakou (yellow card) 12'; Sardinero 44'; Zelaya 77'	Report	Nemec (yellow card) 27' (goal) 80'	Stadium: Tsirio Stadium; Referee: Timotheos Christofi

22 September 2018 3	Pafos	0–2	AEL Limassol	Paphos
20:00 EEST (UTC+3)	Folprecht (yellow card) 43'	Report	Jurado 49'; Benítez (yellow card) 75'; Avraam 86'	Stadium: Stelios Kyriakides Stadium; Referee: Avraam Tsoukkas

6 October 2018 4	Nea Salamis Famagusta	3–0	Pafos	Larnaca
17:00 EEST (UTC+3)	Noor 23'; Thiago 38', 45+3' (pen.); Golobart (yellow card) 73'	Report	Folprecht (yellow card) 81'	Stadium: Ammochostos Stadium; Referee: Giorgos Nikolaou

22 October 2018 5	Pafos	0–1	Alki Oroklini	Paphos
19:00 EEST (UTC+3)	Cools (yellow card) 6'; Angulo (yellow card) 66'; Rasic (yellow card) 72'	Report	Špoljarić 41'; Christofi (yellow card) 47'; Belameiri (yellow card) 59'; Kyprianou (yellow card) 59' (yellow-red card) 74'	Stadium: Stelios Kyriakides Stadium; Referee: Demetris Masias

27 October 2018 6	Omonoia Nicosia	2–4	Pafos	Strovolos
17:00 EET (UTC+2)	López 6'; Christofi 51'	Report	Jander (yellow card) 48'; Angulo 58', 66' (yellow card) 67'; Nemec 60', 63' (pen.); Živulić (yellow card) 81'	Stadium: GSP Stadium; Referee: Constantinos Photiou

4 November 2018 7	Pafos	0–0	APOEL	Paphos
17:00 EET (UTC+2)	Nemec (yellow card) 49'; Zachariou (yellow card) 68'; Živulić (yellow card) 85'; Širok (yellow card) 90'	Report	Souza (yellow card) 54'; Al-Taamari (yellow card) 66'	Stadium: Stelios Kyriakides Stadium; Referee: Leontios Trattos

10 November 2018 8	Ermis Aradippou	3–0	Pafos	Larnaca
18:00 EET (UTC+2)	Taralidis 19'; Fylaktou (yellow card) 34'; Keita 37'; Martynyuk 41' (pen.)	Report	Lorran (yellow card) 75'; Banggaard (yellow card) 83'; Angulo (yellow card) 90'	Stadium: Ammochostos Stadium; Referee: Loukas Soteriou

25 November 2018 9	Pafos	1–0	Enosis Neon Paralimni	Paphos
16:00 EET (UTC+2)	Cools (yellow card) 12'; Holt (yellow card) 15'; Nemec 38' (pen.); Karo (yellow card) 83'	Report	Enoh (yellow card) 38'; Moulazimis (yellow card) 65'	Stadium: Stelios Kyriakides Stadium; Referee: Chrysovalantis Theouli

2 December 2018 10	Doxa Katokopias	3–2	Pafos	Nicosia
16:00 EET (UTC+2)	Mitrea (yellow card) 20'; Sadik 26' (pen.), 61' (pen.); Pavlov 74'	Report	Holt (yellow card) 25'; Rasic 30'; Angulo 49' (pen.)	Stadium: Makario Stadium; Referee: Giorgos Nikolaou

8 December 2018 11	Pafos	1–0	AEK Larnaca	Paphos
17:00 EET (UTC+2)	Živulić (yellow card) 11' (yellow-red card) 70'; Širok (yellow card) 26'; Nemec 45'; Rasic (yellow card) 54'; Mall (yellow card) 90+3'; Banggaard (yellow card) 90+4'	Report	Hevel (yellow card) 36'; García (yellow card) 71'	Stadium: Stelios Kyriakides Stadium; Referee: Timotheos Christofi

15 December 2018 12	Anorthosis Famagusta	2–2	Pafos	Larnaca
19:00 EET (UTC+2)	Kacharava 23'; Dovbnya 51' (o.g.); Douglão (yellow card) 77'; Koffi (yellow card) 78'; Victor (yellow card) 78'	Report	Schildenfeld 13' (o.g.); Rasic (yellow card) 57'; Nemec 67'; Mall (yellow card) 74'; Jander (yellow card) 77'; Panayiotou (yellow card) 89'	Stadium: Antonis Papadopoulos Stadium; Referee: Andreas Argyrou

22 December 2018 13	Pafos	1–1	Apollon Limassol	Paphos
17:00 EET (UTC+2)	Nemec 34'; Cools (yellow card) 42'	Report	Marković 31'	Stadium: Stelios Kyriakides Stadium; Referee: Loukas Soteriou

2 January 2019 14	AEK Larnaca	3–0	Pafos	Larnaca
18:00 EET (UTC+2)	Hevel (yellow card) 11'; Florian 24'	Report	Cools (yellow card) 10'; Zachariou (yellow card) 29'; Polizzi (yellow card) 33'; Folprecht 78'; Holt (yellow card) 86'	Stadium: AEK Arena; Referee: Vasilis Demetriou
Note: Match awarded to AEK Larnaca after Pafos used an unregistered player.

5 January 2019 15	AEL Limassol	1–0	Pafos	Limassol
17:00 EET (UTC+2)	Adamović (yellow card) 24'; Zdravkovski (yellow card) 41'; Makris 55'	Report	Jander (yellow card) 45+1'; Nemec (yellow card) 45+1'; Banggaard (yellow card) 84'; Lulinha (yellow card) 90+3'	Stadium: Tsirio Stadium; Referee: Nikolas Neokleous

12 January 2019 16	Pafos	1–3	Nea Salamis Famagusta	Paphos
17:00 EET (UTC+2)	Folprecht (yellow card) 37'; Širok (yellow card) 58'; Panayiotou (yellow card) 85'; Angulo 87' (yellow card) 88'; Zantis (yellow card) 90+2'	Report	Mintikkis 27'; Golobart (yellow card) 54'; Onuegbu 80' (pen.); Noor 90+1'	Stadium: Stelios Kyriakides Stadium; Referee: Neofytos Neofytou

20 January 2019 17	Alki Oroklini	3–3	Pafos	Larnaca
17:00 EET (UTC+2)	Kyprianou (yellow card) 23'; Špoljarić 35', 40'; Acosta (yellow card) 57'; Starokin 90+5'	Report	Holt (yellow card) 15'; Angulo 31'; Karo 44' (yellow card) 76'; Nemec (yellow card) 51'; Živulić (yellow card) 57'; Cools (yellow card) 67' (goal) 76'	Stadium: Ammochostos Stadium; Referee: Leontios Trattos

26 January 2019 18	Pafos	1–0	Omonoia Nicosia	Paphos
19:00 EET (UTC+2)	Nemec 4' (pen.); Jander (yellow card) 23'; Lelyukhin (yellow card) 28'	Report	Katelaris (yellow card) 22'; Vyntra (yellow card) 45+2'; Kousoulos (yellow card) 48'; Kolovos (yellow card) 87'	Stadium: Stelios Kyriakides Stadium; Referee: Vasilis Demetriou

2 February 2019 19	APOEL	1–2	Pafos	Strovolos
17:00 EET (UTC+2)	Nsue 27' (yellow card) 47'; Carlão (yellow card) 37'	Report	Karo 11' (yellow card) 58'; Lelyukhin (yellow card) 18'; Jander (yellow card) 28'; Širok (yellow card) 33'; Holt (yellow card) 50'; Angulo (yellow card) 54' (goal) 61'; Nemec (yellow card) 64'; Rakels (yellow card) 75'; Panayiotou (yellow card) 90+4'	Stadium: GSP Stadium; Referee: Nikolas Neokleous

11 February 2019 20	Pafos	2–1	Ermis Aradippou	Paphos
19:00 EET (UTC+2)	Nemec 43', 57' (pen.); Jander (yellow card) 61'; Lulinha (yellow card) 70'; Rasic (yellow card) 85'	Report	N'Ganga (yellow card) 56'; Martynyuk (yellow card) 57'; Kike (yellow card) 60'; Mavrou 78'; Kuagica (yellow card) 85'	Stadium: Stelios Kyriakides Stadium; Referee: Vasilis Demetriou

16 February 2019 21	Enosis Neon Paralimni	1–1	Pafos	Paralimni
18:00 EET (UTC+2)	Maisuradze (yellow card) 11'; Udoji 27'; Riera (yellow card) 68'	Report	Karo (yellow card) 33'; Rasic (yellow card) 50'; Nemec 65'; Širok (yellow card) 90+6'	Stadium: Paralimni Stadium; Referee: Nikolas Neokleous

23 February 2019 22	Pafos	1–0	Doxa Katokopias	Paphos
17:00 EET (UTC+2)	Nemec (yellow card) 23'; Angulo 54'; Folprecht (yellow card) 66'; Rasic (yellow card) 90+4'; Holt (red card) 90+6'	Report	Carlos (yellow card) 40'; Soteriou (yellow card) 75' (red card) 90+6'; Mouhtaris (yellow card) 78'; Tincu (yellow card) 85'; Chadjivasilis (yellow card) 88'; Mitrea (yellow card) 90+4' (yellow-red card) 90+5'	Stadium: Stelios Kyriakides Stadium; Referee: Constantinos Photiou

==== Relegation round ====
===== League table =====
Pos	Team	Pld	W	D	L	GF	GA	GD	Pts	Relegation
7	Anorthosis Famagusta (Note: Anorthosis were deducted six points for use of unregistered player on a game against Apollon on 2 February 2019.)	32	12	11	9	42	41	+1	41	
8	Pafos FC (Note: Pafos FC were deducted six points for use of unregistered player on a game against AEK Larnaca on 2 January 2019.)	32	12	8	12	39	50	−11	38	
9	Doxa Katokopias	32	9	8	15	47	50	−3	35	
10	Enosis Neon Paralimni	32	9	8	15	35	51	−16	35	
11	Alki Oroklini (R)	32	10	5	17	35	58	−23	35	Relegation to the Cypriot Second Division
12	Ermis Aradippou (R)	32	3	4	25	29	65	−36	13	Relegation to the Cypriot Second Division

Source: CFA
Rules for classification: 1) Points; 2) Head-to-head points; 3) Head-to-head goal difference; 4) Head-to-head goals scored; 5) Head-to-head away goals scored (only if two teams); 6) Goal difference; 7) Goals scored; 8) Play-off (only if deciding champion or UEFA competitions).
(R) Relegated

===== Results summary =====
Overall								Home						Away					
Pld	W	D	L	GF	GA	GD	Pts	W	D	L	GF	GA	GD	W	D	L	GF	GA	GD
10	5	2	3	15	14	+1	17	2	0	3	7	9	−2	3	2	0	8	5	+3

Last updated: 17 May 2019.
Source: Results

===== Results by results =====
Matchday	1	2	3	4	5	6	7	8	9	10
Ground	H	A	H	A	H	A	H	A	H	A
Result	L	D	L	W	W	W	W	D	L	W
Position	8	9	11	9	8	8	8	8	9	8

Updated to match(es) played on 17 May 2019. Source: Results
A = Away; H = Home; W = Win; D = Draw; L = Loss; P = Postponed

===== Results =====
3 March 2019 1	Pafos	0–3	Alki Oroklini	Paphos
16:00 EET (UTC+2)	Živulić (yellow card) 39'; Zachariou (yellow card) 50'; Karo (yellow card) 85'; Mall (red card) 88'	Report	Živulić 28' (o.g.); Flores 42'; Trajchevski (yellow card) 46'; Stavrou 65' (pen.)	Stadium: Stelios Kyriakides Stadium; Referee: Vasilis Demetriou

9 March 2019 2	Doxa Katokopias	0–0	Pafos	Nicosia
19:00 EET (UTC+2)	Mouhtaris (yellow card) 19'; Tincu (yellow card) 23'; Boljević (yellow card) 45'	Report	Folprecht (yellow card) 27'; Karo (yellow card) 44'	Stadium: Makario Stadium; Referee: Giorgos Nikolaou

17 March 2019 3	Pafos	0–1	Anorthosis Famagusta	Paphos
16:00 EET (UTC+2)	Angulo (yellow card) 56'; Nemec (yellow card) 81'; Banggaard (yellow card) 90+1'	Report	Pranjić (yellow card) 45+2'; Kyriakou (yellow card) 45+3'; João Victor 90+3'; Schildenfeld (yellow card) 90+7'	Stadium: Stelios Kyriakides Stadium; Referee: Nikolas Neokleous

30 March 2019 4	Enosis Neon Paralimni	1–2	Pafos	Paralimni
16:00 EEST (UTC+3)	Antoniou 58'; Fytanidis (yellow card) 90+1'	Report	Cools 4', 10'; Banggaard (yellow card) 39'; Karo (yellow card) 51'; Dovbnya (yellow card) 65'; Ibrahim (yellow card) 70'; Nemec (yellow card) 74'	Stadium: Paralimni Stadium; Referee: Kyriakos Christodoulou

6 April 2019 5	Pafos	4–1	Ermis Aradippou	Paphos
17:00 EEST (UTC+3)	Rakels 12'; Angulo 18'; Živulić (yellow card) 45'; Cools 54'; Nemec 69'	Report	Mavrou (yellow card) 40'; Pounnas (yellow card) 77'; Mantovani 89'	Stadium: Stelios Kyriakides Stadium; Referee: Neofytos Neofytou

13 April 2019 6	Alki Oroklini	2–3	Pafos	Larnaca
18:00 EEST (UTC+3)	Ivan Carlos 12'; Tribeau (yellow card) 44'; Acosta 85'; Belameiri (yellow card) 90+3'; Pardo (yellow card) 90+6'	Report	Rasic 75'; Nemec 80'; Dovbnya 90+5'	Stadium: Ammochostos Stadium; Referee: Chrysovalantis Theouli

20 April 2019 7	Pafos	3–2	Doxa Katokopias	Paphos
19:00 EEST (UTC+3)	Cools 18', 28'; Nemec 76'	Report	Papafotis 16'; Boljević 65'	Stadium: Stelios Kyriakides Stadium; Referee: Chrysovalantis Theouli

5 May 2019 8	Anorthosis Famagusta	1–1	Pafos	Larnaca
19:00 EEST (UTC+3)	Pranjić 28' (pen.)	Report	Živulić (yellow card) 26'; Nemec 44'; Banggaard (yellow card) 53'; Rasic (yellow card) 63'	Stadium: Antonis Papadopoulos Stadium; Referee: Loukas Soteriou

12 May 2019 9	Pafos	0–2	Enosis Neon Paralimni	Paphos
19:15 EEST (UTC+3)	Rasic (yellow card) 16'; Dovbnya (yellow card) 52'; Angulo (red card) 76'; Cools (yellow card) 79'	Report	Maisuradze (yellow card) 29'; Antoniou 53' (pen.); Gozlan (yellow card) 55'; Pittas 58'; Angeli (yellow card) 62'; Moulazimis (yellow card) 78'	Stadium: Stelios Kyriakides Stadium; Referee: Kyriakos Christodoulou

17 May 2019 10	Ermis Aradippou	1–2	Pafos	Larnaca
19:00 EEST (UTC+3)	Mavrou 19'; Lytra (yellow card) 64'	Report	Rasic (yellow card) 27' (goal) 80'; Nemec 31'; Folprecht (yellow card) 51'; Ibrahim (yellow card) 82'	Stadium: Ammochostos Stadium; Referee: Constantinos Photiou

=== Cypriot Cup ===
5 December 2018 First Round	Olympiakos Nicosia	0–5	Pafos	Nicosia
18:00 EET (UTC+2)	Georgallides (yellow card) 35'	Report	Rasic 18', 44', 47' (yellow card) 25'; Nemec 36'; Panayiotou 75'	Stadium: Makario Stadium; Referee: Avraam Tsoukkas

16 January 2019 Second Round 1st Leg	Aris Limassol	2–1	Pafos	Limassol
15:00 EET (UTC+2)	Maragoudakis (yellow card) 56'; Armiche (yellow card) 61' (goal) 75'; Kyprou 69'; Špoljarić (yellow card) 88'	Report	Živulić (yellow card) 38'; Lelyukhin (yellow card) 55'; Nemec (yellow card) 56'; Cools 59'	Stadium: Tsirio Stadium; Attendance: 100; Referee: Andreas Konstantinou

23 January 2019 Second Round 2nd Leg	Pafos	4–1 (5–3 agg.)	Aris Limassol	Paphos
17:00 EET (UTC+2)	Nemec 21', 47' (pen.); Banggaard (yellow card) 32'; Lulinha 57'; Rasic 90'	Report	Hadjipaschalis 31'; A.Mammides (yellow card) 34'; E.Kyriakou (yellow card) 45+2'	Stadium: Stelios Kyriakides Stadium; Attendance: 300; Referee: Chrysovalantis Theouli

20 February 2019 Quarterfinal 1st leg	Pafos	2–2	Enosis Neon Paralimni	Paphos
15:00 EET (UTC+2)	Angulo 44'; Karo 52'	Report	Udoji 24'; Gozlan (yellow card) 69'; Charalambous 78'	Stadium: Stelios Kyriakides Stadium; Attendance: 300; Referee: Chrysovalantis Theouli

27 February 2019 Quarterfinal 2nd leg	Enosis Neon Paralimni	1–1 (3–3 agg.)	Pafos	Paralimni
15:00 EET (UTC+2)	Udoji (yellow card) 18'; Kolokoudias 59' (pen.); Vallianos (yellow card) 62'; Riera (yellow card) 88'; Klaiman (yellow card) 90+1'	Report	Rasic 9' (yellow card) 57' (yellow-red card) 83'; Folprecht (yellow card) 24'; Nemec (yellow card) 47'	Stadium: Paralimni Stadium; Attendance: 1,000; Referee: Loukas Soteriou

== Squad statistics ==
As of match played 9 March 2020

=== Appearances and goals ===
No.	Pos	Nat	Player	Total		Cyta Championship		Cypriot Cup	
No.	Pos	Nat	Player	Apps	Goals	Apps	Goals	Apps	Goals
1	GK	(Switzerland) SUI	Joël Mall	32	0	27	0	5	0
2	DF	(Cyprus) CYP	Andreas Karo	24	3	16+3	2	5	1
3	DF	(Scotland) SCO	Kevin Holt	28	0	26	0	2	0
6	DF	(Brazil) BRA	Lorran	8	0	4+4	0	0	0
8	DF	(Slovenia) SVN	Matija Širok	33	0	27+3	0	3	0
10	MF	(Brazil) BRA	Lulinha	22	1	2+16	0	2+2	1
11	FW	(Cyprus) CYP	Panagiotis Zachariou	14	0	7+6	0	0+1	0
12	GK	(Cyprus) CYP	Evgenios Petrou	4	0	4	0	0	0
15	DF	(Cyprus) CYP	Kyriakos Antoniou	2	0	1+1	0	0	0
16	MF	(Norway) NOR	Abdisalam Ibrahim	9	0	4+3	0	0+2	0
19	FW	(Argentina) ARG	Federico Rasic	32	8	18+10	3	3+1	5
21	DF	(Brazil) BRA	Jander	21	0	16+1	0	4	0
22	DF	(Cyprus) CYP	Andreas Panayiotou	23	1	8+13	0	1+1	1
24	MF	(Belgium) BEL	Jens Cools	28	7	23+2	6	2+1	1
25	MF	(Czech Republic) CZE	Zdeněk Folprecht	34	1	24+5	1	4+1	0
26	DF	(Denmark) DEN	Patrick Banggaard	34	0	29	0	5	0
40	MF	(Cyprus) CYP	Ektoras Stefanou	1	0	0+1	0	0	0
44	MF	(Croatia) CRO	Diego Živulić	31	0	24+2	0	4+1	0
47	DF	(Cyprus) CYP	Sotiris Zantis	2	0	0+2	0	0	0
53	MF	(Netherlands) NED	Simo Choukoud	2	0	0+2	0	0	0
66	DF	(Russia) RUS	Pavel Lelyukhin	11	0	6+2	0	2+1	0
70	MF	(Colombia) COL	Brayan Angulo	34	10	25+4	9	5	1
77	FW	(Slovakia) SVK	Adam Nemec	33	19	27+1	16	5	3
90	DF	(Russia) RUS	Aleksandr Dovbnya	17	1	8+8	1	0+1	0
92	FW	(Latvia) LVA	Deniss Rakels	21	1	16+1	1	3+1	0
96	MF	(Belgium) BEL	Luca Polizzi	10	0	3+6	0	0+1	0
98	GK	(Greece) GRE	Giannis Angelopoulos	1	0	1	0	0	0
Players away on loan:
74	FW	(France) FRA	Kévin Bérigaud	3	0	3	0	0	0
Players who appeared for Pafos but left during the season:
18	DF	(Greece) GRE	Kostas Giannoulis	1	0	1	0	0	0
32	DF	(Czech Republic) CZE	Radek Dejmek	4	0	2+2	0	0	0

=== Goal scorers ===
Place	Position	Nation	Number	Name	Cyta Championship	Cypriot Cup	Total
1	FW	(Slovakia)	77	Adam Nemec	16	3	19
2	MF	(Colombia)	70	Brayan Angulo	9	1	10
3	FW	(Argentina)	19	Federico Rasic	3	5	8
4	MF	(Belgium)	24	Jens Cools	6	1	7
5	DF	(Cyprus)	2	Andreas Karo	2	1	3
6	DF	(Russia)	90	Aleksandr Dovbnya	1	0	1
6	MF	(Czech Republic)	25	Zdeněk Folprecht	1	0	1
6	FW	(Latvia)	92	Deniss Rakels	1	0	1
6	MF	(Cyprus)	22	Andreas Panayiotou	0	1	1
6	MF	(Brazil)	10	Lulinha	0	1	1
Total					39	13	52

=== Clean sheets ===
Place	Position	Nation	Number	Name	Cyta Championship	Cypriot Cup	Total
1	GK	(Switzerland)	1	Joël Mall	5	1	6
2	GK	(Cyprus)	12	Evgenios Petrou	1	0	1
TOTALS					6	1	7

=== Disciplinary record ===
Number	Nation	Position	Name	Cyta Championship		Cypriot Cup		Total	
Number	Nation	Position	Name	Booked	Sent off (straight red)	Booked	Sent off (straight red)	Booked	Sent off (straight red)
1	(Switzerland)	GK	Joël Mall	2	1	0	0	2	1
2	(Cyprus)	DF	Andreas Karo	7	0	0	0	7	0
3	(Scotland)	DF	Kevin Holt	5	1	0	0	5	1
6	(Brazil)	DF	Lorran	1	0	0	0	1	0
8	(Slovenia)	DF	Matija Širok	5	0	0	0	5	0
10	(Brazil)	MF	Lulinha	2	0	0	0	2	0
11	(Cyprus)	FW	Panagiotis Zachariou	3	0	0	0	3	0
16	(Norway)	MF	Abdisalam Ibrahim	2	0	0	0	2	0
19	(Argentina)	FW	Federico Rasic	9	0	3	1	12	1
21	(Brazil)	DF	Jander	6	0	0	0	6	0
22	(Cyprus)	DF	Andreas Panayiotou	3	0	0	0	3	0
24	(Belgium)	MF	Jens Cools	6	0	0	0	6	0
25	(Czech Republic)	MF	Zdeněk Folprecht	6	0	1	0	7	0
26	(Denmark)	DF	Patrick Banggaard	7	0	1	0	8	0
44	(Croatia)	MF	Diego Živulić	8	1	1	0	9	1
47	(Cyprus)	DF	Sotiris Zantis	1	0	0	0	1	0
66	(Russia)	MF	Pavel Lelyukhin	2	0	1	0	3	0
70	(Colombia)	MF	Brayan Angulo	6	1	0	0	6	1
77	(Slovakia)	FW	Adam Nemec	8	0	2	0	10	0
90	(Russia)	DF	Aleksandr Dovbnya	2	0	0	0	2	0
92	(Latvia)	FW	Deniss Rakels	1	0	0	0	1	0
96	(Belgium)	MF	Luca Polizzi	1	0	0	0	1	0
Players away on loan:
74	(France)	FW	Kévin Bérigaud	1	0	0	0	1	0
Players who left Pafos during the season:
Total				92	4	9	1	101	5
