= List of Cypriot football transfers winter 2019–20 =

This is a list of Cypriot football transfers for the 2019–20 winter transfer window by club. Only transfers of clubs in the Cypriot First Division and Cypriot Second Division are included.

== Cypriot First Division ==
Note: Flags indicate national team as has been defined under FIFA eligibility rules. Players may hold more than one non-FIFA nationality.

=== AEK Larnaca ===
In:

No.	Pos.	Nation	Player
6	MF	ESP	Abraham González (free agent)
17	DF	ESP	José Manuel Fernández (from (Spain) Córdoba)
24	DF	ESP	Román Golobart (from (Israel) Maccabi Netanya)
28	FW	ESP	Naranjo (on loan from (Spain) CD Tenerife)

Out:

No.	Pos.	Nation	Player
27	DF	ESP	Raúl (on loan to (Spain) Hércules CF)
14	MF	CRO	Ivan Fiolić (loan return to (Belgium) KRC Genk)
41	MF	ESP	Nacho Cases (on loan to (Greece) Volos)

=== AEL Limassol ===
In:

No.	Pos.	Nation	Player
50	FW	SRB	Andrija Majdevac (on loan from (Malta) Balzan F.C.)

Out:

No.	Pos.	Nation	Player
9	FW	BRA	Ivan Carlos (released)
15	MF	NGA	Fidelis Irhene (released, previously on loan at Doxa Katokopias)
42	DF	CYP	Christos Wheeler (to APOEL)

=== Anorthosis Famagusta ===
In:

No.	Pos.	Nation	Player
49	MF	GEO	Jano Ananidze (from (Russia) Spartak Moscow)
77	FW	CYP	Demetris Christofi (from Omonia)

Out:

No.	Pos.	Nation	Player
2	DF	CIV	Erwin Koffi (to Olympiakos Nicosia)
19	FW	FIN	Berat Sadik (to Enosis Neon Paralimni)
23	DF	CYP	Marios Stylianou (on loan to Omonia)
44	DF	CYP	Pavlos Correa (to Ethnikos Achna)

=== APOEL ===
In:

No.	Pos.	Nation	Player
16	FW	ISL	Björn Sigurðarson (on loan from (Russia) Rostov)
31	MF	DEN	Mike Jensen (from (Norway) Rosenborg BK)
42	DF	CYP	Christos Wheeler (from AEL Limassol)
77	MF	SRB	Milan Jevtović (on loan from (Serbia) Red Star Belgrade)

Out:

No.	Pos.	Nation	Player
—	DF	CYP	Stefanos Mouhtaris (to Olympiakos Nicosia, previously on loan at Doxa Katokopias)
6	MF	GRE	Savvas Gentsoglou (to (Saudi Arabia) Al-Adalah)
8	MF	BRA	Lucas Souza (to (China) Changchun Yatai)
18	MF	CYP	Andreas Artemiou (on loan at Ypsonas FC, previously on loan at Ayia Napa)
23	MF	POR	Joãozinho (to (Portugal) Estoril Praia)
89	FW	SVN	Roman Bezjak (to (Slovenia) Olimpija Ljubljana)

=== Apollon Limassol ===
In:

No.	Pos.	Nation	Player
23	MF	SRB	Đorđe Denić (on loan from (Norway) Rosenborg BK)
27	FW	ARG	Matías Roskopf (from (Romania) Rapid București)
35	FW	CUW	Charlison Benschop (from (Netherlands) Groningen)
93	MF	ROU	Florentin Matei (from (Romania) Astra Giurgiu)

Out:

No.	Pos.	Nation	Player
11	FW	ARG	Emilio Zelaya (to (Saudi Arabia) Damac FC)
94	FW	TRI	Daniel Carr (released)
95	MF	FRA	Roger Tamba M'Pinda (released)

=== Doxa Katokopias ===
In:

No.	Pos.	Nation	Player
15	DF	AUT	Mladen Jutrić (from (Japan) Ehime)
53	GK	CPV	Thierry Graça (free agent)
55	DF	BRA	Nelsinho (from (Portugal) Vilafranquense)
99	FW	BRA	Jorginho (from (Bulgaria) Cherno More Varna)

Out:

No.	Pos.	Nation	Player
5	DF	CYP	Stefanos Mouhtaris (to Olympiakos Nicosia, previously on loan from APOEL)
8	MF	NGA	Fidelis Irhene (loan return to AEL Limassol)
19	MF	CYP	Nektarios Alexandrou (released)
30	DF	CYP	Vasilis Demosthenous (to Nea Salamis Famagusta)
88	MF	CYP	Andreas Hadjiconstanti (to Aris Limassol)

=== Enosis Neon Paralimni ===
In:

No.	Pos.	Nation	Player
3	DF	FRA	Magatte Sarr (loan return from Ermis Aradippou)
18	DF	URU	Diego Barboza (from (Uruguay) Montevideo Wanderers)
33	DF	SVN	Gregor Balažic (free agent)
90	FW	FIN	Berat Sadik (from Anorthosis Famagusta)

Out:

No.	Pos.	Nation	Player
4	DF	MKD	Risto Mitrevski (to (Armenia) FC Alashkert)
9	FW	POL	Mateusz Szczepaniak (to (Poland) Warta Poznań)

=== Ethnikos Achna ===
In:

No.	Pos.	Nation	Player
12	MF	CRO	Stjepan Babić (from (Slovenia) Tabor Sežana)
17	DF	SRB	Josip Projić (from (Serbia) FK Kolubara)
44	DF	CYP	Pavlos Correa (from Anorthosis Famagusta)

Out:

No.	Pos.	Nation	Player
3	DF	CYP	Ioannis Efstathiou (to Karmiotissa)
15	MF	CYP	Simeon Kone (on loan to Achyronas Liopetriou)
35	FW	CYP	Andreas Elia (on loan to ASIL)
66	MF	CYP	Nikos Katzis (on loan to Chalkanoras Idaliou)

=== Nea Salamis Famagusta ===
In:

No.	Pos.	Nation	Player
3	DF	LTU	Rolandas Baravykas (from (Lithuania) FK Žalgiris)
6	DF	ESP	Deivid Rodríguez (on loan from (Spain) UD Las Palmas)
54	FW	TRI	Ryan Telfer (from (Canada) Toronto FC)
77	DF	CYP	Vasilis Demosthenous (from Doxa Katokopias)

Out:

No.	Pos.	Nation	Player
23	DF	GRE	Savvas Tsabouris (to (Greece) Apollon Smyrnis)
28	FW	LBR	Tonia Tisdell (to (Egypt) ENPPI SC)

=== Olympiakos Nicosia ===
In:

No.	Pos.	Nation	Player
22	DF	CIV	Erwin Koffi (from Anorthosis Famagusta)
29	GK	GRE	Marcos Vellidis (free agent)
88	FW	CHI	Pedro Campos (free agent)
95	DF	CYP	Stefanos Mouhtaris (from APOEL, previously on loan at Doxa Katokopias)

Out:

No.	Pos.	Nation	Player
4	DF	GUI	Ousmane Sidibé (to (France) Red Star)
6	MF	CMR	Eyong Enoh (released)
18	MF	CMR	Landry (released)

=== Omonia ===
In:

No.	Pos.	Nation	Player
10	MF	NGA	Babajide David (on loan from (Denmark) Midtjylland)
28	DF	CYP	Marios Stylianou (on loan from Anorthosis Famagusta)
29	GK	ROU	Costel Pantilimon (on loan from (England) Nottingham Forest)

Out:

No.	Pos.	Nation	Player
2	DF	POR	Joel Pereira (on loan to (Slovakia) Spartak Trnava)
18	MF	ISR	Hen Ezra (to (Israel) Maccabi Netanya)
49	MF	CYP	Fanos Katelaris (on loan to (Hungary) Zalaegerszegi)
77	FW	CYP	Demetris Christofi (to Anorthosis Famagusta)

=== Pafos FC ===
In:

No.	Pos.	Nation	Player
24	MF	FIN	Onni Valakari (from (Norway) Tromsø IL)
31	MF	CZE	Zdeněk Folprecht (loan return from (Czech Republic) Zlín)
70	MF	COL	Brayan Angulo (from (Colombia) Independiente Medellín)
92	FW	LVA	Deniss Rakels (loan return from (Latvia) Riga)

Out:

No.	Pos.	Nation	Player
6	MF	NGA	Sunny (released)
10	MF	BRA	Lulinha (to (Japan) Júbilo Iwata)
19	FW	ARG	Federico Rasic (released)
70	MF	COL	Brayan Angulo (on loan to (Latvia) Riga)

== Cypriot Second Division ==
=== Group A ===
==== Alki Oroklini ====
In:

No.	Pos.	Nation	Player
21	MF	ESP	Asier Arranz (from (Spain) Gimnástica Segoviana)
77	FW	CYP	Leandros Lillis (from (United States) Temple Owls)

Out:

No.	Pos.	Nation	Player
7	MF	CYP	Yiannis Pachipis (to Aris Limassol)
14	MF	ARG	Fabián Muñoz (to (Albania) KF Bylis)

==== Aris Limassol ====
In:

No.	Pos.	Nation	Player
6	MF	CYP	Andreas Hadjiconstanti (from Doxa Katokopias)
18	MF	CYP	Yiannis Pachipis (from Alki Oroklini)

Out:

No.	Pos.	Nation	Player
7	FW	CYP	Panayiotis Therapontos (to Elia Lythrodonta)
9	FW	NED	Robin Eindhoven (to (Netherlands) SV Spakenburg)

==== ASIL ====
In:

No.	Pos.	Nation	Player
35	FW	CYP	Andreas Elia (on loan from Ethnikos Achna)
88	MF	GRE	Dimitris Grontis (from (Greece) Ergotelis)

Out:

No.	Pos.	Nation	Player
11	FW	CIV	Christo Amessan (from Ayia Napa)

==== Ayia Napa ====
In:

No.	Pos.	Nation	Player
11	FW	CIV	Christo Amessan (from ASIL)
14	MF	ESP	Joan Tomàs (from (Indonesia) Persija Jakarta)

Out:

No.	Pos.	Nation	Player
18	MF	CYP	Andreas Artemiou (loan return to APOEL, now on loan at Ypsonas FC)
33	DF	GRE	Ioannis Pechlivanopoulos (to Digenis Morphou)

==== Karmiotissa ====
In:

No.	Pos.	Nation	Player
3	DF	CYP	Ioannis Efstathiou (from Ethnikos Achna)
8	MF	BRA	Eduardo Pincelli (from Omonia Aradippou)
28	MF	GRE	Agathoklis Polyzos (from (Greece) Panserraikos)

Out:

No.	Pos.	Nation	Player
22	FW	LBR	Theo Weeks (to Omonia Aradippou)
97	FW	CYP	Sotiris Zantis (to (Germany) Viktoria Köln U19)

==== Omonia Aradippou ====
In:

No.	Pos.	Nation	Player
27	FW	LBR	Theo Weeks (from Karmiotissa)
92	FW	ARG	Kevin Levis (from (Spain) Xerez Deportivo)

Out:

No.	Pos.	Nation	Player
8	MF	BRA	Eduardo Pincelli (to Karmiotissa)
17	GK	CYP	Demetris Tziakouris (to MEAP Nisou)
19	FW	CYP	Antreas Anastasiou (to Digenis Oroklinis)

==== Omonia Psevda ====
In:

No.	Pos.	Nation	Player
3	FW	SLE	Lawrence Panda (free agent)
13	MF	CYP	Demetris Pratziotis (from Olympias Lympion)

Out:

No.	Pos.	Nation	Player
33	GK	MKD	Ilche Petrovski (to (North Macedonia) FK Labunishta)

==== Ypsonas FC ====
In:

No.	Pos.	Nation	Player
18	MF	CYP	Andreas Artemiou (on loan from APOEL, previously on loan at Ypsonas FC)
90	FW	CYP	Stamatis Pantos (from AEZ Zakakiou)

Out:

No.	Pos.	Nation	Player
14	FW	CYP	Marinos Evelthontos (to Kourris Erimis)
70	FW	CYP	Nicolas Theodorou (to AEZ Zakakiou)

=== Group B ===
==== AEZ Zakakiou ====
In:

No.	Pos.	Nation	Player
31	DF	CYP	Panayiotis Foklas (from Amathus Ayiou Tychona)
70	FW	CYP	Nicolas Theodorou (from Ypsonas FC)

Out:

No.	Pos.	Nation	Player
10	FW	CYP	Stamatis Pantos (to Ypsonas FC)
17	DF	CYP	Olymbios Antoniades (to Kourris Erimis)
29	DF	CYP	Andreas Mammides (to Akritas Chlorakas)

==== Akritas Chlorakas ====
In:

No.	Pos.	Nation	Player
15	MF	ENG	Mason Saunders-Henry (from (England) Whyteleafe)
24	MF	GAB	Ulysse Ndong (free agent)
29	DF	CYP	Andreas Mammides (from AEZ Zakakiou)
31	MF	NED	Akram Salhi (free agent)

Out:

No.	Pos.	Nation	Player
18	DF	FRA	Mahamadou Diarra (released)
23	MF	BEL	Mouad Tauil (released)
41	DF	CYP	Marios Ioannou (released)

==== Anagennisi Deryneia ====
In:

No.	Pos.	Nation	Player
70	FW	GRE	Christos Efstathiou (from Onisilos Sotira 2014)

Out:

No.	Pos.	Nation	Player
3	DF	CYP	Angelos Chrysostomou (to PAEEK)

==== Digenis Akritas Morphou ====
In:

No.	Pos.	Nation	Player
3	DF	GRE	Ioannis Pechlivanopoulos (from Ayia Napa)

Out:

No.	Pos.	Nation	Player
8	MF	GRE	Yiannis Papadopoulos (to (Greece) Rodos)
10	FW	CIV	Gaoussou Fofana (released)

==== Ermis Aradippou ====
In:

No.	Pos.	Nation	Player
—	GK	ALB	Armand Demalija (free agent)
40	MF	ESP	Didac Devesa (from (Romania) Politehnica Iași)
93	MF	FRA	Josué Ntoya (free agent)

Out:

No.	Pos.	Nation	Player
3	DF	SRB	Dragan Žarković (released)
5	MF	CYP	Christos Mantovani (on loan to Digenis Oroklinis)
19	FW	CYP	Savvas Lytra (on loan to MEAP Nisou)
22	DF	FRA	Magatte Sarr (loan return to Enosis Neon Paralimni)
40	MF	SRB	Dragomir Vukobratović (released)
89	FW	SRB	Saša Popin (released)

==== Onisilos Sotira 2014 ====
In:

No.	Pos.	Nation	Player
47	FW	POR	Cláudio Ribeiro (from (Portugal) AD Fafe)

Out:

No.	Pos.	Nation	Player
10	MF	BRA	Diogo Sodré (to (Brazil) Votuporanguense)
11	FW	GRE	Christos Efstathiou (to Anagennisi Deryneia)

==== Othellos Athienou ====
In:

No.	Pos.	Nation	Player
65	FW	BRA	Bernardo (from (Brazil) Madureira, previously on loan at Bagé)

Out:

No.	Pos.	Nation	Player
10	MF	BRA	Marcolino (to (Greece) Egaleo)
11	FW	POR	Monteiro (released)
72	MF	GRE	Aristidis Kokkoris (to (Greece) Kavala)

==== PO Xylotymbou ====
In:

No.	Pos.	Nation	Player
—	DF	SEN	Hamidou Bakhayokho (free agent)
30	GK	SVN	David Adam (on loan from (Slovenia) Tabor Sežana)
77	MF	ALB	Franco Kokonozi (free agent)
91	MF	FRA	Ilan Yapi Yapo (free agent)
81	DF	GRE	Kostas Tsoupros (from (Greece) Asteras Vlachioti)

Out:

No.	Pos.	Nation	Player
9	FW	BUL	Dimitar Makriev (released)
10	MF	NED	Mitchell Schet (released)
17	MF	GRE	Giannis Taralidis (released)
41	DF	CYP	Agathangelos Nikiforou (to Digenis Oroklinis)
