= List of Cypriot football transfers winter 2017–18 =

This is a list of Cypriot football transfers for the 2017–18 winter transfer window by club. Only transfers of clubs in the Cypriot First Division are included.

The winter transfer window opened on 1 January 2018, although a few transfers took place prior to that date. The window closed at midnight on 1 February 2018. Players without a club may join one at any time, either during or in between transfer windows.

== Cypriot First Division ==
=== AEK Larnaca ===
In: Note: Flags indicate national team as defined under FIFA eligibility rules; some limited exceptions apply. Players may hold more than one non-FIFA nationality.

No.	Pos.	Nation	Player
99	FW	AUS	Apostolos Giannou (from (China) Guangzhou R&F)

Out: Note: Flags indicate national team as defined under FIFA eligibility rules; some limited exceptions apply. Players may hold more than one non-FIFA nationality.

No.	Pos.	Nation	Player
21	FW	CYP	Nikos Englezou (on loan to Aris Limassol)
25	FW	CYP	Nestoras Mitidis (on loan to (Greece) Kerkyra)
70	MF	CYP	Constantinos Charalambidis (retired)

=== AEL Limassol ===
In: Note: Flags indicate national team as defined under FIFA eligibility rules; some limited exceptions apply. Players may hold more than one non-FIFA nationality.

No.	Pos.	Nation	Player
10	FW	BRA	Denilson (from (China) Zhejiang Greentown)
16	MF	ESP	Manuel Torres (from (Germany) Greuther Fürth)
23	FW	ESP	Joan Román (from (Portugal) Braga B)
99	FW	URU	David Texeira (from (Portugal) Vitória Guimarães)

Out: Note: Flags indicate national team as defined under FIFA eligibility rules; some limited exceptions apply. Players may hold more than one non-FIFA nationality.

No.	Pos.	Nation	Player
9	FW	BRA	Tiago Leonço (to (Hong Kong) R&F)
11	FW	ESP	Mikel Arruabarrena (to (Spain) Fuenlabrada)
31	FW	GNB	Aldair (to (Portugal) Gil Vicente)
94	MF	BRA	Arthur (to (Brazil) Santa Cruz)

=== Alki Oroklini ===
In: Note: Flags indicate national team as defined under FIFA eligibility rules; some limited exceptions apply. Players may hold more than one non-FIFA nationality.

No.	Pos.	Nation	Player
16	FW	NED	Nassir Maachi (from (Greece) Apollon Smyrnis)
70	MF	POR	Ruca (on loan from (Portugal) Tondela)
93	DF	FRA	Christopher Glombard (free agent)

Out: Note: Flags indicate national team as defined under FIFA eligibility rules; some limited exceptions apply. Players may hold more than one non-FIFA nationality.

No.	Pos.	Nation	Player
9	FW	CYP	Sergios Avraam (to Omonia Aradippou)
23	FW	BUL	Radoslav Vasilev (to (Bulgaria) Cherno More)
39	MF	CYP	Christos Kallis (to Digenis Oroklinis)
94	MF	FRA	Yoann Tribeau (to Olympiakos Nicosia)

=== Anorthosis Famagusta ===
In: Note: Flags indicate national team as defined under FIFA eligibility rules; some limited exceptions apply. Players may hold more than one non-FIFA nationality.

No.	Pos.	Nation	Player
2	DF	CIV	Erwin Koffi (from (France) Lorient)
3	MF	NGA	Nosa Igiebor (from (United States) Vancouver Whitecaps)
6	DF	SVN	Andraž Struna (from (United States) New York City)
8	FW	SVK	Michal Ďuriš (on loan from (Russia) Orenburg)

Out: Note: Flags indicate national team as defined under FIFA eligibility rules; some limited exceptions apply. Players may hold more than one non-FIFA nationality.

No.	Pos.	Nation	Player
2	MF	RUS	Sergei Makarov (to (Russia) SKA Khabarovsk)
11	DF	BUL	Ivan Bandalovski (to (Bulgaria) Beroe Stara Zagora)
15	MF	NGA	Shehu Abdullahi (to (Turkey) Bursaspor)

=== APOEL ===
In: Note: Flags indicate national team as defined under FIFA eligibility rules; some limited exceptions apply. Players may hold more than one non-FIFA nationality.

No.	Pos.	Nation	Player
2	DF	EQG	Emilio Nsue (from (England) Birmingham City)
23	DF	BLR	Dzyanis Palyakow (from (Belarus) BATE Borisov)
49	FW	BRA	Dellatorre (from (Brazil) Atlético Paranaense)

Out: Note: Flags indicate national team as defined under FIFA eligibility rules; some limited exceptions apply. Players may hold more than one non-FIFA nationality.

No.	Pos.	Nation	Player

=== Apollon Limassol ===
In: Note: Flags indicate national team as defined under FIFA eligibility rules; some limited exceptions apply. Players may hold more than one non-FIFA nationality.

No.	Pos.	Nation	Player
18	MF	SRB	Saša Marković (from (Spain) Córdoba)
90	GK	CYP	Ellinas Sofroniou (from Ermis Aradippou)

Out: Note: Flags indicate national team as defined under FIFA eligibility rules; some limited exceptions apply. Players may hold more than one non-FIFA nationality.

No.	Pos.	Nation	Player
1	GK	ROU	Valentin Cojocaru (to (Romania) Viitorul Constanța)
56	DF	CYP	Leonidas Kyriakou (on loan to THOI Lakatamia)
96	MF	BEL	Luca Polizzi (on loan to Olympiakos Nicosia)

=== Aris Limassol ===
In: Note: Flags indicate national team as defined under FIFA eligibility rules; some limited exceptions apply. Players may hold more than one non-FIFA nationality.

No.	Pos.	Nation	Player
21	FW	CYP	Nikos Englezou (on loan from AEK Larnaca)
22	MF	BFA	Stephane Aziz Ki (on loan from Omonia)
82	DF	GRE	Georgios Kousas (from (Greece) AEL)
94	MF	FRA	Kevin Tapoko (from (Greece) Panionios)

Out: Note: Flags indicate national team as defined under FIFA eligibility rules; some limited exceptions apply. Players may hold more than one non-FIFA nationality.

No.	Pos.	Nation	Player
90	FW	ROU	Marius Alexe (to (Turkey) Karabükspor)

=== Doxa Katokopias ===
In: Note: Flags indicate national team as defined under FIFA eligibility rules; some limited exceptions apply. Players may hold more than one non-FIFA nationality.

No.	Pos.	Nation	Player
18	FW	GHA	Francis Narh (from (Bulgaria) Levski Sofia)
23	MF	CYP	Stefanos Charalambous (from (Belgium) Lokeren U19)
97	FW	BRA	Bruno Rodrigues (on loan from (Brazil) Atlético-PR)

Out: Note: Flags indicate national team as defined under FIFA eligibility rules; some limited exceptions apply. Players may hold more than one non-FIFA nationality.

No.	Pos.	Nation	Player
7	FW	COL	Yair Castro (to Ethnikos Achna)
8	MF	POR	Tiago Gomes (to (Malaysia) Melaka United)
16	DF	BRA	Leandro Pinto (to (Greece) Trikala)

=== Ermis Aradippou ===
In: Note: Flags indicate national team as defined under FIFA eligibility rules; some limited exceptions apply. Players may hold more than one non-FIFA nationality.

No.	Pos.	Nation	Player
18	MF	ESP	Alfonso Artabe (free agent)
24	MF	NED	Pim Bouwman (free agent)
25	FW	POR	Monteiro (from (Portugal) Anadia)
26	MF	CYP	Demetris Kyprianou (from Ethnikos Achna)

Out: Note: Flags indicate national team as defined under FIFA eligibility rules; some limited exceptions apply. Players may hold more than one non-FIFA nationality.

No.	Pos.	Nation	Player
2	DF	GRE	Dimitrios Sandravelis (released)
27	MF	LBR	Theo Weeks (to (Lebanon) Al-Ansar)
41	GK	CYP	Ellinas Sofroniou (to Apollon Limassol)

=== Ethnikos Achna ===
In: Note: Flags indicate national team as defined under FIFA eligibility rules; some limited exceptions apply. Players may hold more than one non-FIFA nationality.

No.	Pos.	Nation	Player
80	FW	COL	Yair Castro (from Doxa Katokopias)

Out: Note: Flags indicate national team as defined under FIFA eligibility rules; some limited exceptions apply. Players may hold more than one non-FIFA nationality.

No.	Pos.	Nation	Player
2	DF	BUL	Borislav Stoychev (to (Bulgaria) Arda Kardzhali)
5	MF	BRA	Eduardo Pincelli (to (Republic of Ireland) Sligo Rovers)
7	FW	RUS	Nikolai Kipiani (to Omonia)
25	MF	CYP	Demetris Kyprianou (to Ermis Aradippou)
26	DF	MKD	Mite Cikarski (to (Greece) PAS Giannina)
28	DF	BUL	Filip Filipov (to (Bulgaria) Botev Plovdiv)
55	DF	CYP	Demetris Moulazimis (to (Czech Republic) Olympia Prague)
77	MF	ROU	Bogdan Gavrilă (to (Romania) Politehnica Iași)

=== Nea Salamina ===
In: Note: Flags indicate national team as defined under FIFA eligibility rules; some limited exceptions apply. Players may hold more than one non-FIFA nationality.

No.	Pos.	Nation	Player
1	GK	BUL	Mario Kirev (free agent)
70	FW	BRA	Thiago (from (Thailand) Ubon UMT United)
83	FW	BRA	Carlão (from (Thailand) Ubon UMT United)
89	MF	AFG	Farshad Noor (from (Sweden) Eskilstuna)
99	FW	CMR	Charles Eloundou (from (United States) Jacksonville Armada)

Out: Note: Flags indicate national team as defined under FIFA eligibility rules; some limited exceptions apply. Players may hold more than one non-FIFA nationality.

No.	Pos.	Nation	Player
7	MF	POR	Hélio Roque (released)
10	FW	ARG	Gastón Sangoy (released)
21	DF	ITA	Davide Grassi (to (Greece) Kerkyra)
32	GK	CYP	Demetris Stylianou (to P.O. Xylotymbou)
92	DF	GRE	Nikolas Lougkos (released)
97	MF	GRE	Giorgos Kakko (loan return to (Greece) PAOK)

=== Olympiakos Nicosia ===
In: Note: Flags indicate national team as defined under FIFA eligibility rules; some limited exceptions apply. Players may hold more than one non-FIFA nationality.

No.	Pos.	Nation	Player
15	MF	RUS	Artur Valikayev (from (Estonia) Nõmme Kalju)
30	DF	GRE	Nikos Ziabaris (from (Greece) OFI)
94	MF	FRA	Yoann Tribeau (from Alki Oroklini)
96	MF	BEL	Luca Polizzi (on loan from Apollon Limassol)

Out: Note: Flags indicate national team as defined under FIFA eligibility rules; some limited exceptions apply. Players may hold more than one non-FIFA nationality.

No.	Pos.	Nation	Player

=== Omonia ===
In: Note: Flags indicate national team as defined under FIFA eligibility rules; some limited exceptions apply. Players may hold more than one non-FIFA nationality.

No.	Pos.	Nation	Player
9	FW	RUS	Nikolai Kipiani (from Ethnikos Achna)
88	GK	BUL	Nikolay Mihaylov (from (Turkey) Mersin İdmanyurdu)
--	GK	SWE	John Alvbåge (from (Sweden) IFK Göteborg)
--	FW	NGA	Theophilus Solomon (on loan from (Croatia) Rijeka)

Out: Note: Flags indicate national team as defined under FIFA eligibility rules; some limited exceptions apply. Players may hold more than one non-FIFA nationality.

No.	Pos.	Nation	Player
5	DF	BRA	Fabrício (released)
11	FW	ARG	Leandro González (released)
15	FW	BEL	Jonathan Benteke (released)
17	MF	BFA	Blati Touré (released)
22	GK	NED	Piet Velthuizen (released)
29	MF	BFA	Stephane Aziz Ki (on loan to Aris Limassol)

=== Pafos ===
In: Note: Flags indicate national team as defined under FIFA eligibility rules; some limited exceptions apply. Players may hold more than one non-FIFA nationality.

No.	Pos.	Nation	Player
74	FW	FRA	Kévin Bérigaud (from (France) Montpellier)
80	MF	RUS	Dmitri Torbinski (from (Russia) Krasnodar)

Out: Note: Flags indicate national team as defined under FIFA eligibility rules; some limited exceptions apply. Players may hold more than one non-FIFA nationality.

No.	Pos.	Nation	Player
8	FW	SVN	Mitja Lotrič (to (Slovenia) Celje)
14	DF	ZAM	Prosper Chiluya (released)
34	DF	LVA	Antonijs Černomordijs (loan return to (Latvia) Riga FC)

== Cypriot Second Division ==
=== AEZ Zakakiou ===
In: Note: Flags indicate national team as defined under FIFA eligibility rules; some limited exceptions apply. Players may hold more than one non-FIFA nationality.

No.	Pos.	Nation	Player

Out: Note: Flags indicate national team as defined under FIFA eligibility rules; some limited exceptions apply. Players may hold more than one non-FIFA nationality.

No.	Pos.	Nation	Player

=== Anagennisi Deryneia ===
In: Note: Flags indicate national team as defined under FIFA eligibility rules; some limited exceptions apply. Players may hold more than one non-FIFA nationality.

No.	Pos.	Nation	Player

Out: Note: Flags indicate national team as defined under FIFA eligibility rules; some limited exceptions apply. Players may hold more than one non-FIFA nationality.

No.	Pos.	Nation	Player

=== ASIL ===
In: Note: Flags indicate national team as defined under FIFA eligibility rules; some limited exceptions apply. Players may hold more than one non-FIFA nationality.

No.	Pos.	Nation	Player

Out: Note: Flags indicate national team as defined under FIFA eligibility rules; some limited exceptions apply. Players may hold more than one non-FIFA nationality.

No.	Pos.	Nation	Player

=== Ayia Napa ===
In: Note: Flags indicate national team as defined under FIFA eligibility rules; some limited exceptions apply. Players may hold more than one non-FIFA nationality.

No.	Pos.	Nation	Player

Out: Note: Flags indicate national team as defined under FIFA eligibility rules; some limited exceptions apply. Players may hold more than one non-FIFA nationality.

No.	Pos.	Nation	Player

=== Chalkanoras Idaliou ===
In: Note: Flags indicate national team as defined under FIFA eligibility rules; some limited exceptions apply. Players may hold more than one non-FIFA nationality.

No.	Pos.	Nation	Player

Out: Note: Flags indicate national team as defined under FIFA eligibility rules; some limited exceptions apply. Players may hold more than one non-FIFA nationality.

No.	Pos.	Nation	Player

=== Digenis Oroklinis ===
In: Note: Flags indicate national team as defined under FIFA eligibility rules; some limited exceptions apply. Players may hold more than one non-FIFA nationality.

No.	Pos.	Nation	Player

Out: Note: Flags indicate national team as defined under FIFA eligibility rules; some limited exceptions apply. Players may hold more than one non-FIFA nationality.

No.	Pos.	Nation	Player

=== Enosis Neon Paralimni ===
In: Note: Flags indicate national team as defined under FIFA eligibility rules; some limited exceptions apply. Players may hold more than one non-FIFA nationality.

No.	Pos.	Nation	Player

Out: Note: Flags indicate national team as defined under FIFA eligibility rules; some limited exceptions apply. Players may hold more than one non-FIFA nationality.

No.	Pos.	Nation	Player

=== Ethnikos Assia ===
In: Note: Flags indicate national team as defined under FIFA eligibility rules; some limited exceptions apply. Players may hold more than one non-FIFA nationality.

No.	Pos.	Nation	Player

Out: Note: Flags indicate national team as defined under FIFA eligibility rules; some limited exceptions apply. Players may hold more than one non-FIFA nationality.

No.	Pos.	Nation	Player

=== Karmiotissa ===
In: Note: Flags indicate national team as defined under FIFA eligibility rules; some limited exceptions apply. Players may hold more than one non-FIFA nationality.

No.	Pos.	Nation	Player

Out: Note: Flags indicate national team as defined under FIFA eligibility rules; some limited exceptions apply. Players may hold more than one non-FIFA nationality.

No.	Pos.	Nation	Player

=== Omonia Aradippou ===
In: Note: Flags indicate national team as defined under FIFA eligibility rules; some limited exceptions apply. Players may hold more than one non-FIFA nationality.

No.	Pos.	Nation	Player

Out: Note: Flags indicate national team as defined under FIFA eligibility rules; some limited exceptions apply. Players may hold more than one non-FIFA nationality.

No.	Pos.	Nation	Player

=== Othellos Athienou FC ===
In: Note: Flags indicate national team as defined under FIFA eligibility rules; some limited exceptions apply. Players may hold more than one non-FIFA nationality.

No.	Pos.	Nation	Player

Out: Note: Flags indicate national team as defined under FIFA eligibility rules; some limited exceptions apply. Players may hold more than one non-FIFA nationality.

No.	Pos.	Nation	Player

=== PAEEK ===
In: Note: Flags indicate national team as defined under FIFA eligibility rules; some limited exceptions apply. Players may hold more than one non-FIFA nationality.

No.	Pos.	Nation	Player

Out: Note: Flags indicate national team as defined under FIFA eligibility rules; some limited exceptions apply. Players may hold more than one non-FIFA nationality.

No.	Pos.	Nation	Player

=== P.O. Xylotymbou ===
In: Note: Flags indicate national team as defined under FIFA eligibility rules; some limited exceptions apply. Players may hold more than one non-FIFA nationality.

No.	Pos.	Nation	Player
17	FW	BEL	Emmerik De Vriese (from (Romania) Gaz Metan Mediaș)
31	GK	CYP	Demetris Stylianou (from Nea Salamina)

Out: Note: Flags indicate national team as defined under FIFA eligibility rules; some limited exceptions apply. Players may hold more than one non-FIFA nationality.

No.	Pos.	Nation	Player

=== ENTHOI Lakatamia FC ===
In: Note: Flags indicate national team as defined under FIFA eligibility rules; some limited exceptions apply. Players may hold more than one non-FIFA nationality.

No.	Pos.	Nation	Player

Out: Note: Flags indicate national team as defined under FIFA eligibility rules; some limited exceptions apply. Players may hold more than one non-FIFA nationality.

No.	Pos.	Nation	Player
