= Brayan Angulo =

Brayan Angulo may refer to:

- Brayan Angulo (footballer, born 1989), Colombian football left-back
- Brayan Angulo (footballer, born 1993), Colombian football midfielder

== See also ==
- Bryan Angulo (born 1995), Ecuadorian football forward
