= Eridanas Bagužas =

Lithuanian footballer (born 2004)

Personal information
- Date of birth: 28 July 2004 (age 22)
- Place of birth: Telšiai, Lithuania
- Height: 1.82 m (6 ft 0 in)
- Position: Forward

Team information
- Current team: Babrungas
- Number: 28

Youth career
- Džiugas
- 2016: Be1 NFA
- 2017–2021: Džiugas

Senior career*
Years	Team	Apps	(Gls)
2021–2022	Džiugas	2	(0)
2022	→ Babrungas (loan)	3	(3)
2023–	Babrungas	17	(12)
2024	→ Džiugas (loan)	22	(1)
2024	→ PK-35 (loan)	6	(0)

International career
2022	Lithuania U19	1	(0)
2023–	Lithuania U21	4	(0)
- * Club domestic league appearances and goals as of 13 May 2025

Eridanas Bagužas (born 28 July 2004) is a Lithuanian professional footballer who plays as a forward for Babrungas Plungė.

== Club career ==
On 26 August 2024, Bagužas was loaned out to PK-35 in Finnish Ykkösliiga for the remainder of the season.

== Career statistics ==
As of 13 May 2025

Appearances and goals by club, season and competition
Club	Season	League			National cup (Note: Includes Lithuanian Cup)		Other		Total	
Club	Season	Division	Apps	Goals	Apps	Goals	Apps	Goals	Apps	Goals
Dziugas	2021	A Lyga	2	0	0	0	–		2	0
Dziugas	2022	A Lyga	0	0	0	0	–		0	0
Dziugas	Total		2	0	0	0	0	0	2	0
Babrungas (loan)	2022	I Lyga	3	3	1	0	–		4	3
Babrungas	2023	I Lyga	10	12	2	0	–		12	12
Babrungas	2024	I Lyga	0	0	0	0	–		0	0
Babrungas	2025	I Lyga	7	0	1	0	–		8	0
Babrungas	Total		17	12	3	0	0	0	20	12
Dziugas (loan)	2024	A Lyga	22	1	2	1	–		24	2
PK-35 (loan)	2024	Ykkösliiga	6	0	–		–		6	0
Career total			50	16	6	1	0	0	56	17
