= Adam Nemec =

Slovak footballer (born 1985)

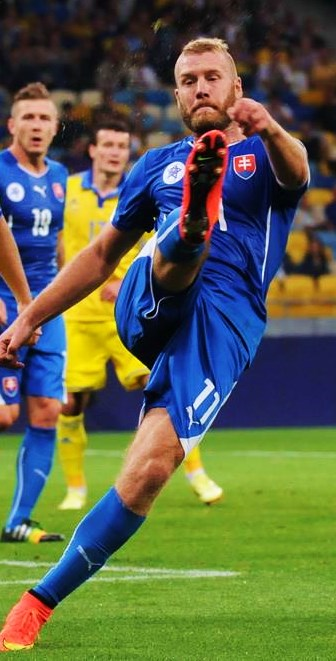
- Nemec playing for Slovakia in 2014

Personal information
- Date of birth: 2 September 1985 (age 41)
- Place of birth: Banská Bystrica, Czechoslovakia
- Height: 1.90 m (6 ft 3 in)
- Position: Forward

Team information
- Current team: Höflein
- Number: 12

Youth career
- Žarnovica
- Žiar nad Hronom
- –2003: Dubnica

Senior career*
Years	Team	Apps	(Gls)
2002–2004	Dubnica	19	(8)
2004–2008	Žilina	62	(17)
2007–2008	→ Erzgebirge Aue (loan)	29	(10)
2008–2009	Genk	21	(4)
2009–2012	1. FC Kaiserslautern	61	(9)
2012	FC Ingolstadt	15	(2)
2012–2015	Union Berlin	60	(14)
2015	New York City	9	(0)
2015–2016	Willem II	10	(0)
2016–2018	Dinamo București	57	(17)
2018–2020	Pafos	42	(17)
2020–2021	Dinamo București	30	(4)
2021–2026	Voluntari	154	(39)
2026–	Höflein	2	(1)

International career
2006	Slovakia U21	1	(0)
2006–2019	Slovakia	43	(13)
- * Club domestic league appearances and goals as of 4 September 2026

Adam Nemec (Slovak pronunciation: [ˈadam ˈɲemets]; born 2 September 1985) is a Slovak professional footballer who plays as a forward for 1. Klasse Ost club Höflein.

In his career, he has played in seven countries but mostly for teams in Germany and Romania. During 13 years of international career, he won 43 caps and scored 13 goals.

== Personal life ==
His father, named Milan Nemec, was also footballer who represented Czechoslovakia.

== Club career ==
=== Žilina ===
When playing for MSK Žilina from 2004 to 2007, the team became Slovak champion in 2007.

=== Erzgebirge Aue ===
In August 2007, he signed a loan deal with the 2. Bundesliga side Erzgebirge Aue where he scored ten goals and provided seven assists in 29 games.

=== Genk ===
On 11 June 2008, Nemec signed a four-year deal with Belgian club KRC Genk. He remained at the club for only one season however, in which he scored four goals in 21 matches.

=== Kaiserslautern ===
In July 2009, he was involved in talks over a move to Scottish Premier League club Heart of Midlothian which ultimately failed. On 28 July 2009, however, Nemec signed a three-year contract for 1. FC Kaiserslautern, returning to Germany's second division.

Reportedly falling from a cherry tree in his garden in June 2011, Nemec suffered injuries including broken ribs, a broken collarbone that required surgery, and a concussion which kept him out of football for about three months. He returned to training in early September. He left the club during the mid-season break in January 2012, after having appeared in 61 league matches and scoring nine goals in his two and a half seasons.

=== Ingolstadt 04 ===
On 27 January 2012, Nemec joined FC Ingolstadt until the end of the season. He made his competitive debut for the club on 4 February 2012 in a 1–1 draw in the league with Fortuna Düsseldorf.

=== Union Berlin ===
On 24 July 2012, he signed a two-year contract with Union Berlin in the German second division until June 2014. In December 2013, his contract was extended until 2016 including an option for another year. Only five months later though, in April 2014, the club announced it had released him, however he stayed with Union.

After playing in just five games through the first half of the season, his contract was terminated in January 2015. Union manager Norbert Düwel said: "It is a pity that cooperation has not worked as both sides had imagined. Under these circumstances, it is better to part ways."

=== New York City ===
On 25 January 2015, he signed with New York City FC ahead of their first season in Major League Soccer. He made eight starts for the team in nine overall appearances, although he did not score a goal or record an assist during that time. On 31 August 2015, New York City FC and Nemec mutually agreed to terminate his contract.

=== Willem II ===
On 31 August 2015, fifteen minutes before the closing of the transfer window, Nemec signed a one-year deal with Dutch Eredivisie side Willem II.

=== Dinamo București ===
On 6 September 2016, Nemec signed a two-year deal with Romanian side Dinamo București.

In his first season with the club, on 20 May 2017 Nemec scored two goals in the final of the 2016–17 Cupa Ligii. Dinamo defeated ACS Poli Timișoara 2–0 and won this trophy for the first time in history. At the same time, it was the only trophy Nemec won in Romania.

On 10 May 2018, Dinamo's coach Florin Bratu confirmed, that after expiration of his contract with Dinamo, Nemec wants to leave the club. At the national team meeting, on 29 May, Nemec confirmed that his intention to depart and added, that his subsequent contract will be his last professional one, adding that he seeks a financially attractive deal or else he prefers a return home.

On 29 August 2020, he returned to Dinamo București on a one-year contract, with an option for an additional year.

=== Pafos ===
On 27 August 2018, he joined Pafos of the Cypriot First Division on a one-year contract, with an option for an additional year. He scored 16 goals in the league, winning the golden boot as well.

== International career ==
On 10 December 2006, Nemec debuted for the Slovak senior squad during a friendly match against United Arab Emirates. He scored five goals in 2018 FIFA World Cup qualification, including in three in two matches against Malta.

On 22 February 2019, Nemec announced his retirement from international football at the age of 33, along with two national team defenders Tomáš Hubočan and Martin Škrtel. The trio shared a farewell game on 13 October 2019 in a friendly match against Paraguay, which coincided with a national team return to Tehelné pole after ten years.

== Career statistics ==
=== Club ===
As of match played on 4 September2026

Appearances and goals by club, season and competition
Club	Season	League			National cup (Note: Includes Belgian Cup, DFB-Pokal, KNVB Cup, Cupa României)		Continental		Other		Total	
Club	Season	Division	Apps	Goals	Apps	Goals	Apps	Goals	Apps	Goals	Apps	Goals
Žilina	2004–05	Slovak First League	26	3	0	0	—		—		26	3
Žilina	2005–06	Slovak First League	13	0	0	0	—		—		13	0
Žilina	2006–07	Slovak First League	21	13	0	0	—		—		21	13
Žilina	2007–08	Slovak First League	2	1	0	0	2 (Note: Appearances in UEFA Champions League)	0	—		4	1
Žilina	Total		62	17	0	0	2	0	—		64	17
Erzgebirge Aue (loan)	2007–08	2. Bundesliga	29	10	0	0	—		—		29	10
Genk	2008–09	Belgian Pro League	21	4	5	3	—		—		26	7
1. FC Kaiserslautern	2009–10	2. Bundesliga	33	5	3	1	—		—		36	6
1. FC Kaiserslautern	2010–11	Bundesliga	24	3	3	1	—		—		27	4
1. FC Kaiserslautern	2011–12	Bundesliga	4	1	1	0	—		—		5	1
1. FC Kaiserslautern	Total		61	9	7	2	—		—		68	11
FC Ingolstadt	2011–12	2. Bundesliga	15	2	0	0	—		—		15	2
Union Berlin	2012–13	2. Bundesliga	29	9	1	0	—		—		30	9
Union Berlin	2013–14	2. Bundesliga	26	5	3	0	—		—		29	5
Union Berlin	2014–15	2. Bundesliga	5	0	0	0	—		—		5	0
Union Berlin	Total		60	14	4	0	—		—		64	14
New York City	2015	MLS	9	0	0	0	—		—		9	0
Willem II	2015–16	Eredivisie	10	0	3	0	—		—		13	0
Dinamo București	2016–17	Liga I	28	11	1	0	—		2	2	31	13
Dinamo București	2017–18	Liga I	27	6	2	1	2 (Note: Appearances in UEFA Europa League)	0	—		33	7
Dinamo București	Total		57	17	3	1	2	0	2	2	64	20
Pafos	2018–19	Cypriot First Division	28	16	5	3	—		—		33	19
Pafos	2019–20	Cypriot First Division	14	1	1	0	—		—		15	1
Pafos	Total		42	17	6	3	—		—		48	20
Dinamo București	2020–21	Liga I	30	4	4	1	—		—		34	5
Voluntari	2021–22	Liga I	34	7	3	0	—		—		37	7
Voluntari	2022–23	Liga I	37	10	1	0	—		—		38	10
Voluntari	2023–24	Liga I	37	9	2	0	—		—		39	9
Voluntari	2024–25	Liga II	22	7	1	0	—		2 (Note: Appearance in Liga I promotion/relegation play-offs)	0	25	7
Voluntari	2025–26	Liga II	24	6	0	0	—		2	0	26	6
Voluntari	Total		154	39	7	0	—		4	0	165	39
Höflein	2026–27	1. Klasse Ost	2	1	—		—		—		2	1
Career total			552	132	39	10	4	0	6	2	601	144

=== International ===
Appearances and goals by national team and year
National team	Year	Apps	Goals
Slovakia	2006	1	0
Slovakia	2011	1	0
Slovakia	2013	5	0
Slovakia	2014	7	2
Slovakia	2015	5	2
Slovakia	2016	8	4
Slovakia	2017	7	3
Slovakia	2018	8	2
Slovakia	2019	1	0
Total		43	13

Scores and results list Slovakia's goal tally first, score column indicates score after each Nemec goal.

List of international goals scored by Adam Nemec
No.	Date	Venue	Cap	Opponent	Score	Result	Competition
1	4 September 2014	Štadión pod Dubňom, Žilina, Slovakia	11	Malta	1–0	1–0	Friendly
2	15 November 2014	Philip II Arena, Skopje, Macedonia	14	Macedonia	2–0	2–0	UEFA Euro 2016 qualification
3	27 March 2015	Štadión pod Dubňom, Žilina, Slovakia	15	Luxembourg	1–0	3–0	UEFA Euro 2016 qualification
4	12 October 2015	Stade Josy Barthel, Luxembourg City, Luxembourg	18	Luxembourg	2–0	4–2	UEFA Euro 2016 qualification
5	27 May 2016	ASKÖ Stadion, Wels, Austria	21	Georgia	1–0	3–1	Friendly
6	27 May 2016	ASKÖ Stadion, Wels, Austria	21	Georgia	2–0	3–1	Friendly
7	11 October 2016	Štadión Antona Malatinského, Trnava, Slovakia	25	Scotland	3–0	3–0	2018 FIFA World Cup qualification
8	11 November 2016	Štadión Antona Malatinského, Trnava, Slovakia	26	Lithuania	1–0	4–0	2018 FIFA World Cup qualification
9	27 March 2017	Ta'Qali National Stadium, Ta'Qali, Malta	28	Malta	3–1	3–1	2018 FIFA World Cup qualification
10	8 October 2017	Štadión Antona Malatinského, Trnava, Slovakia	32	Malta	1–0	3–0	2018 FIFA World Cup qualification
11	8 October 2017	Štadión Antona Malatinského, Trnava, Slovakia	32	Malta	2–0	3–0	2018 FIFA World Cup qualification
12	31 May 2018	Štadión Antona Malatinského, Trnava, Slovakia	36	Netherlands	1–0	1–1	Friendly
13	5 September 2018	Štadión Antona Malatinského, Trnava, Slovakia	38	Denmark	1–0	3–0	Friendly

== Honours ==
Žilina

- Slovak Super Liga: 2006–07
- Slovak Super Cup: 2004, 2007

Genk

- Belgian Cup: 2008–09

1. FC Kaiserslautern

- 2. Bundesliga: 2009–10

Dinamo București

- Cupa Ligii: 2016–17

FC Voluntari

- Cupa României runner-up: 2021–22

Slovakia

- King's Cup: 2018

Individual

- Liga I Team of the Season: 2016–17
- Cypriot First Division top scorer: 2018–19 (16 goals)
