= 1959–60 LFF Lyga =

LFF Lyga
- Season: 1959–60

The 1959–60 LFF Lyga was the 39th season of the LFF Lyga football competition in Lithuania. It was contested by 12 teams, and Elnias Šiauliai won the championship.

== League standings ==
Pos	Team	Pld	W	D	L	GF	GA	GD	Pts
1	Elnias Šiauliai	22	14	2	6	52	29	+23	30
2	Raudonoji Žvaigždė Vilnius	22	11	8	3	40	19	+21	30
3	Linų Audiniai Plungė	22	12	5	5	30	23	+7	29
4	Inkaras Kaunas	22	11	4	7	36	22	+14	26
5	Spartakas Vilnius	22	12	0	10	54	40	+14	24
6	Melioratorius Kretinga	22	9	6	7	33	39	−6	24
7	KKI Kaunas	22	8	3	11	34	38	−4	19
8	Audra/Baltija Klaipėda	22	7	5	10	31	38	−7	19
9	MSK Panevėžys	22	7	3	12	40	47	−7	17
10	CF Kapsukas	22	7	3	12	26	45	−19	17
11	Lima Kaunas	22	6	4	12	27	42	−15	16
12	Statybininkas Šiauliai	22	6	1	15	32	53	−21	13

Source: rsssf.com

=== Playoff ===
- Elnias Šiauliai 3-2 Raudonoji Žvaigždė Vilnius
