= Andreas Karo =

Cypriot footballer

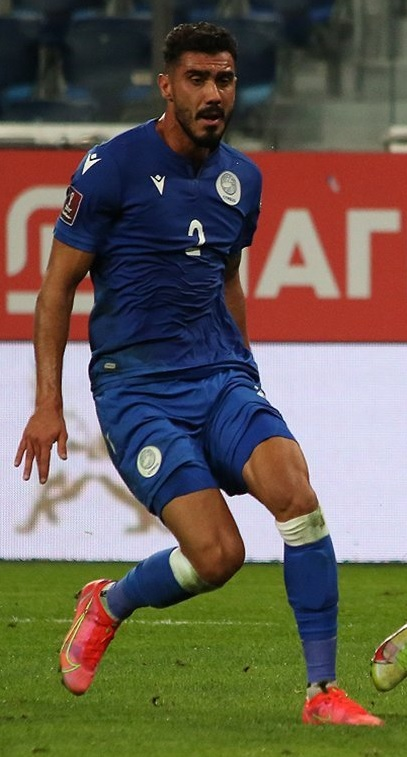
- Karo playing for Cyprus in 2021

Personal information
- Date of birth: 9 September 1996 (age 30)
- Place of birth: Nicosia, Cyprus
- Height: 1.90 m (6 ft 3 in)
- Position: Centre-back

Team information
- Current team: AEL Limassol
- Number: 2

Youth career
- –2012: Anorthosis Famagusta
- 2012–2016: Nottingham Forest

Senior career*
Years	Team	Apps	(Gls)
2016–2019	Apollon Limassol	1	(0)
2017–2018	→ Nea Salamina (loan)	29	(3)
2018–2019	→ Pafos (loan)	19	(2)
2019–2021	Lazio	0	(0)
2019–2021	→ Salernitana (loan)	30	(1)
2021	→ Marítimo (loan)	9	(0)
2021–2023	APOEL	53	(5)
2023–2024	OFI	13	(0)
2024–2025	Maccabi Petah Tikva	26	(1)
2025–2026	Hermannstadt	22	(1)
2026–	AEL Limassol	6	(1)

International career^{‡}
2012	Cyprus U15	2	(0)
2011	Cyprus U17	2	(0)
2013–2014	Cyprus U19	7	(1)
2015–2018	Cyprus U21	18	(2)
2019–	Cyprus	28	(1)
- * Club domestic league appearances and goals as of 7 November 2026 ‡ National team caps and goals as of 18 November 2024

Andreas Karo (Greek: Ανδρέας Καρώ; born 9 September 1996) is a Cypriot professional footballer who plays as a centre-back for Cypriot First Division club AEL Limassol.

== Club career ==
=== Lazio and Salernitana ===
On 12 July 2019, he signed with the Italian club Lazio. A week later, he was loaned to Serie B club Salernitana.

=== Marítimo ===
On 30 January 2021, he joined Portuguese club Marítimo.

=== APOEL ===
On 9 June 2021, he left Marítimo for Cypriot club APOEL.

=== OFI Crete ===
On 7 June 2023, he left APOEL for Greek club OFI.

=== Maccabi Petah Tikva ===
On 1 February 2024, he left OFI for Israeli club Maccabi Petah Tikva. On 30 May 2024, he won his first title with the club, Israel State Cup, after beating Hapoel Be'er Sheva 1–0 in the final.

== Career statistics ==
=== Club ===
As of 18 September 2026

Appearances and goals by club, season and competition
Club	Season	League			National cup (Note: Includes Cypriot Cup, Coppa Italia, Israeli State Cup)		League cup (Note: Includes Toto Cup)		Europe		Other		Total	
Club	Season	Division	Apps	Goals	Apps	Goals	Apps	Goals	Apps	Goals	Apps	Goals	Apps	Goals
Apollon Limassol	2016–17	Cypriot First Division	1	0	2	0	—		—		0	0	3	0
Apollon Limassol	2018–19	Cypriot First Division	—		—		—		1 (Note: Appearance in UEFA Europa League)	0	—		1	0
Apollon Limassol	Total		1	0	2	0	—		1	0	—		4	0
Nea Salamina (loan)	2017–18	Cypriot First Division	29	3	3	0	—		—		—		32	3
Pafos (loan)	2018–19	Cypriot First Division	19	2	5	1	—		—		—		24	3
Salernitana (loan)	2019–20	Serie B	29	1	2	0	—		—		—		31	1
Salernitana (loan)	2020–21	Serie B	1	0	2	0	—		—		—		3	0
Salernitana (loan)	Total		30	1	4	0	—		—		—		34	1
Marítimo (loan)	2020–21	Primeira Liga	9	0	—		—		—		—		9	0
APOEL	2021–22	Cypriot First Division	28	5	2	0	—		—		—		30	5
APOEL	2022–23	Cypriot First Division	25	0	2	2	—		5 (Note: Appearances in UEFA Europa Conference League)	0	—		32	2
APOEL	Total		53	5	4	2	—		5	0	—		62	7
OFI Crete	2023–24	Super League Greece	13	0	0	0	—		—		—		13	0
Maccabi Petah Tikva	2023–24	Israeli Premier League	11	1	4	1	—		—		—		15	2
Maccabi Petah Tikva	2024–25	Israeli Premier League	15	0	0	0	1	0	3 (Note: Two appearances in UEFA Europa League, one appearance in UEFA Conference League)	0	1 (Note: Appearance in Israel Super Cup)	0	20	0
Maccabi Petah Tikva	Total		26	1	4	1	1	0	3	0	1	0	35	2
Hermannstadt	2025–26	Liga I	22	1	1	0	—		—		2 (Note: Appearances in Liga I promotion/relegation play-offs)	0	25	1
AEL Limassol	2026–27	Cypriot First Division	3	0	0	0	—		—		—		3	0
Career total			205	13	23	4	1	0	9	0	3	0	241	17

=== International ===
As of 18 November 2024

Appearances and goals by national team and year
National team	Year	Apps	Goals
Cyprus	2019	1	0
Cyprus	2020	6	0
Cyprus	2021	5	0
Cyprus	2022	1	0
Cyprus	2023	8	1
Cyprus	2024	7	0
Total		28	1

Scores and results list Cyprus's goal tally first, score column indicates score after each Karo goal.

List of international goals scored by Andreas Karo
No.	Date	Venue	Cap	Opponent	Score	Result	Competition
1	28 March 2023	Vazgen Sargsyan Republican Stadium, Yerevan, Armenia	14	Armenia	1–0	2–2	Friendly

== Honours ==
Apollon Limassol

- Cypriot Cup: 2016–17
- Cypriot Super Cup: 2016

Maccabi Petah Tikva

- Israel State Cup: 2023–24
- Israel Super Cup runner-up: 2024
