= 1956 LFF Lyga =

LFF Lyga
- Season: 1956

The 1956 LFF Lyga was the 35th season of the LFF Lyga football competition in Lithuania. It was contested by 12 teams, and Linų Audiniai Plungė won the championship.

== League standings ==
Pos	Team	Pld	W	D	L	GF	GA	GD	Pts
1	Linų Audiniai Plungė	22	16	4	2	42	13	+29	36
2	Elnias Šiauliai	22	15	3	4	71	22	+49	33
3	MSK Panevėžys	22	15	0	7	54	47	+7	30
4	KPI Kaunas	22	13	2	7	42	38	+4	28
5	Spartakas Vilnius	22	11	5	6	53	34	+19	27
6	Inkaras Kaunas	22	8	8	6	38	28	+10	24
7	Raudonasis Spalis Kaunas	22	8	5	9	52	44	+8	21
8	Elfa Vilnius	22	9	2	11	44	32	+12	20
9	Lima Kaunas	22	7	3	12	40	39	+1	17
10	Raudonoji Žvaigždė Vilnius	22	7	3	12	27	41	−14	17
11	Švyturys Klaipėda	22	3	3	16	23	76	−53	9
12	Gubernija Šiauliai	22	0	2	20	8	80	−72	2

Source: rsssf.com

== Bibliography ==
- RSSSF
