= 1958–59 LFF Lyga =

LFF Lyga
- Season: 1958–59

The 1958–59 LFF Lyga was the 38th season of the LFF Lyga football competition in Lithuania. It was contested by 12 teams, and Raudonoji Žvaigždė Vilnius won the championship.

== League standings ==
Pos	Team	Pld	W	D	L	GF	GA	GD	Pts
1	Raudonoji Žvaigždė Vilnius	22	14	8	0	26	11	+15	36
2	KKI Kaunas	22	11	8	3	40	20	+20	30
3	Elnias Šiauliai	22	10	7	5	30	22	+8	27
4	Linų Audiniai Plungė	22	10	4	8	22	29	−7	24
5	MSK Panevėžys	22	9	5	8	40	30	+10	23
6	Spartakas Vilnius	22	7	8	7	24	22	+2	22
7	Inkaras Kaunas	22	9	2	11	44	33	+11	20
8	Melioratorius Kretinga	22	6	6	10	25	32	−7	18
9	Lima Kaunas	22	5	8	9	22	33	−11	18
10	LRĮ Klaipėda	22	6	6	10	18	39	−21	18
11	Raudonasis Spalis Kaunas	22	6	5	11	33	43	−10	17
12	KPI Kaunas	22	4	7	11	20	30	−10	15

Source: rsssf.com
