= FK Babrungas Plungė =

Lithuanian football club

FK Babrungas
- Full name: Futbolo klubas Babrunga
- Founded: 1935; 91 years ago
- Ground: Plungė Stadium
- Capacity: 500
- Coordinates: 55°54′40″N 21°50′30″E
- Chairman: Jurgita Skersė
- Manager: Kęstutis Petkus
- League: TOPLYGA
- 2026: I Lyga, 1st of 16 (champions; promoted)
Home colours	Away colours

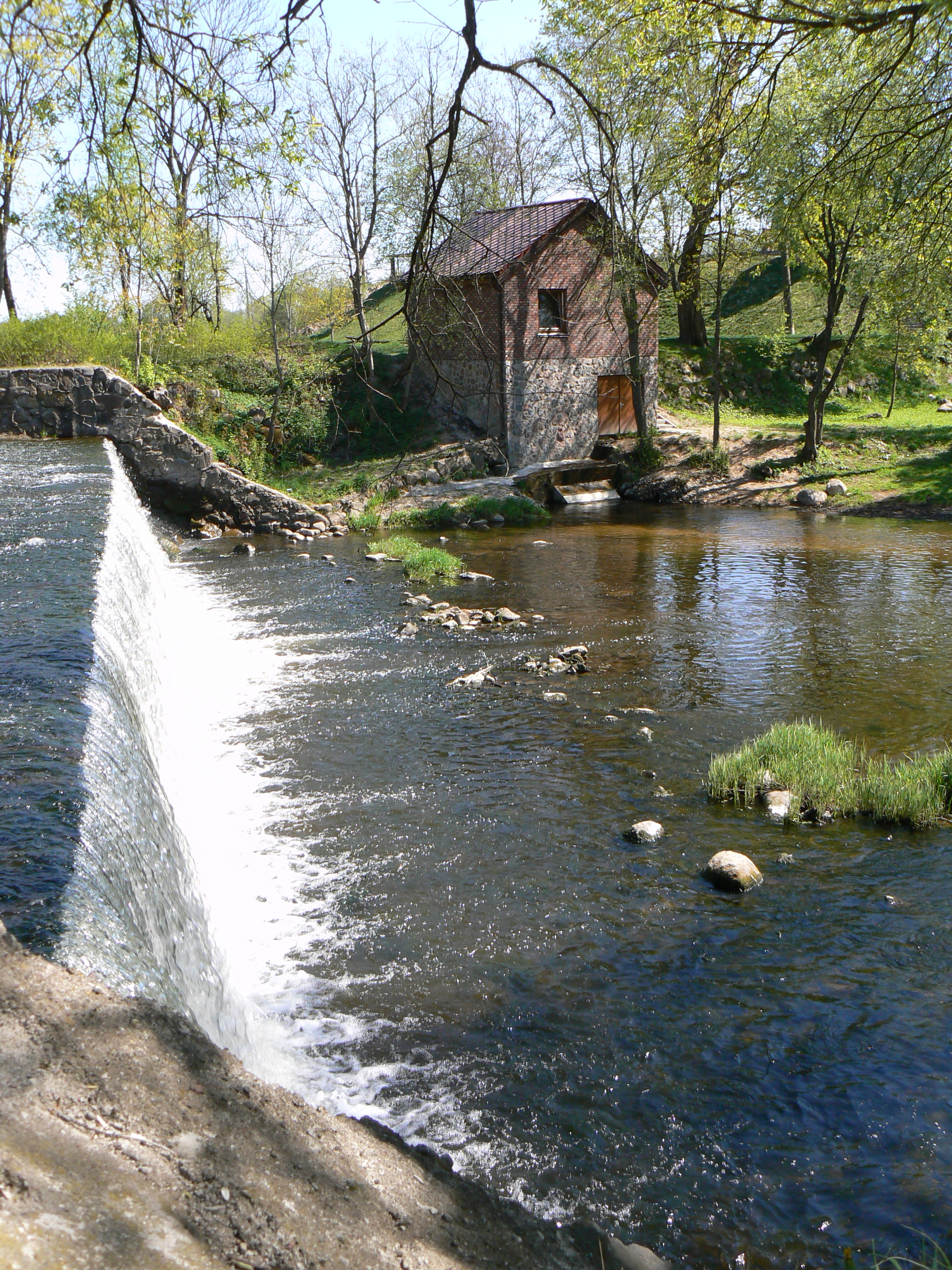
Babrungas – river in Plungė

Futbolo klubas Babrungas, commonly known as Babrungas, is a Lithuanian professional football club located in Plungė, in Plungė District. They currently play in the I Lyga, the second tier of Lithuanian football.

== History ==
The club was created in 1935. During the Soviet era in Lithuania, the club was in the top division for a long time.

In 1956, the team from the small town of Plungė became champions of Lithuania.

Currently, they play in the I Lyga.

== Name ==
Babrungas is a river in Plungė District.

First time the club was renamed Babrungas in 1942. Last time was in 1994.

=== Historical names ===
- 1942—1947: Babrungas
- 1948—1955: Spartakas
- 1956—1972: Linų audiniai
- 1973—1989: Kooperatininkas
- 1990—1993: Robotas
- 1994— now: Babrungas

== Honours ==
- The club's honours in soviet period (Played in "A" klasė (top division) or "B" klasė (second tier).
- In 1956, they became champions of Lithuania.

=== Domestic ===
- Soviet Lithuania A klasė: 1
  - Champions: 1956
- (Lithuania) Pirma lyga (D2)
  - Runners-up: 1990
- (Lithuania) II lyga, Western Zone (D3)
  - Champions: 1996/97 Trečia lyga (D3)*
  - Runners-up: 2018 II Lyga Western Zone (D3)*

Recent seasons team play in II lyga Western Zone championship.

==== A klasė seasons ====
Season	Level	Division	Position	Web
1956	1.	A klasė	1.	
1957	1.	A klasė	3.	
1956	1.	A klasė	7.	
1958–59	1.	A klasė	4.	
1959–60	1.	A klasė	3.	
1960–61	1.	A klasė	5.	

==== Recent seasons ====
Season	Level	Division	Position	Web	
2016	3.	Antra lyga	4.		
2017	3.	Antra lyga	9.		
2018	3.	Antra lyga	2.		
2019	3.	Antra lyga	5.		
2020	3.	Antra lyga	6.		▲ Promotion
2021	2.	Pirma lyga	8.		
2022	2.	Pirma lyga	6.		
2023	2.	Pirma lyga	5.		
2024	2.	Pirma lyga	3.		
2025	2.	Pirma lyga	4.		

== Kit evoliution ==
1956	2010	2016	Goalkeepers

=== Colors ===
- ???? – 2015

BABRUNGAS	BABRUNGAS

- 2016 –

BABRUNGAS	BABRUNGAS

== Stadium ==
Club play their home matches in Plungė Stadium. The current capacity of the stadium is 500 seats.

== Coaching ==
- (United States) Jeremiah "Rudy" Roediger, 2017

== Current squad ==
As of 8 April, 2026

Note: Flags indicate national team as defined under FIFA eligibility rules; some limited exceptions apply. Players may hold more than one non-FIFA nationality.

No.	Pos.	Nation	Player
1	GK	BRA	Maltos
2	DF	LTU	Rokas Župerka
3	DF	LTU	Aurelijus Barusas
4	DF	LTU	Deividas Butkus
5	DF	LTU	Adomas Latakas
6	MF	GHA	Majeed Issah
7	FW	PAR	Pablo Borja
8	MF	LTU	Karolis Mantinis
10	MF	COL	Brayan Angulo
11	DF	LTU	Marius Skirmantas
13	MF	JPN	Kaito Imai
14	DF	LTU	Tomas Budrys
16	MF	LTU	Matas Kazbaras

No.	Pos.	Nation	Player
17	MF	LTU	Vilius Butkus
18	MF	JPN	Shogo Tabata
19	FW	NGR	Miko Dalha
20	MF	LTU	Gustas Paulauskas
22	MF	LTU	Lukas Čepkauskas
23	MF	NGR	Ogenyi Onazi
24	MF	LTU	Justas Šlekonis
27	FW	NGR	Tijjani Mohammed
33	FW	LTU	Eridanas Bagužas
55	MF	GHA	Emmanuel Agyemang
77	MF	LTU	Titanas Ukrinas
99	GK	LTU	Darius Kublickas
