= Simo Choukoud =

Dutch professional footballer

Personal information
- Full name: Mohamed Choukoud
- Date of birth: 1 January 1999 (age 27)
- Place of birth: Delft, Netherlands
- Height: 1.75 m (5 ft 9 in)
- Position: Midfielder

Youth career
- Quintus
- 2008-2014: ADO Den Haag
- 2014-2018: Feyenoord

Senior career*
Years	Team	Apps	(Gls)
–2018	Feyenoord	0	(0)
2018–2019	Pafos FC	2	(0)
- * Club domestic league appearances and goals as of 18:30, 4 July 2020 (UTC)

Simo Choukoud (born 1 January 1999 in the Netherlands) is a Dutch footballer who last played for Pafos in Cyprus.

== Career ==
Choukoud started his senior career with Feyenoord. In 2018, he signed for Pafos in the Cypriot First Division, where he made two appearances and scored zero goals.
