= Giannis Angelopoulos =

Greek footballer (born 1998)

Personal information
- Full name: Ioannis Angelopoulos
- Date of birth: 3 April 1998 (age 28)
- Place of birth: Messenia, Greece
- Height: 1.85 m (6 ft 1 in)
- Position: Goalkeeper

Youth career
- 2008–2017: Olympiacos

Senior career*
Years	Team	Apps	(Gls)
2017–2018	Olympiacos	0	(0)
2018–2019	Pafos	1	(0)
2020–2022	Levadiakos	0	(0)
2023–2024	Levadiakos	0	(0)

International career^{‡}
2018	Greece U20	1	(0)
- * Club domestic league appearances and goals as of 17 May 2019 ‡ National team caps and goals as of 11 January 2018

Giannis Angelopoulos (Greek: Γιάννης Αγγελόπουλος; born 3 April 1998) is a Greek professional footballer who last played as a goalkeeper for Super League club Levadiakos.

== Honours ==
Levadiakos

- Super League 2: 2021–22
