= Jens Cools =

Belgian footballer (born 1990)

Personal information
- Date of birth: 16 October 1990 (age 36)
- Place of birth: Westerlo, Belgium
- Height: 1.89 m (6 ft 2 in)
- Position: Defensive midfielder

Team information
- Current team: ASV Geel
- Number: 22

Youth career
- 1997–2010: Westerlo

Senior career*
Years	Team	Apps	(Gls)
2010–2016	Westerlo	147	(10)
2016–2018	Waasland-Beveren	49	(5)
2018–2019	Pafos	25	(6)
2019–2022	Eupen	73	(3)
2022	Al-Riyadh	7	(1)
2023–2024	Lierse	24	(1)
2024–2025	Jong Westel	18	(1)
2025	→ Houtvenne (loan)		
2025–	ASV Geel	12	(1)

International career
2011	Belgium U21	2	(0)
- * Club domestic league appearances and goals as of 12 May 2024

Jens Cools (born 16 October 1990) is a Belgian professional footballer who plays as a defensive midfielder for Belgian Division 3 club ASV Geel. He gained two caps for the Belgium under-21 team.

== Career ==
=== Westerlo ===
In the 2009–10 season, Cools was promoted from the youth academy to the first team of Westerlo, the club from the municipality where he grew up. He made his professional debut one season later. After having played for six seasons in the first team, Cools' contract expired at the end of the 2015–16 season, as a result of which he left Westerlo on a free transfer. A key player of the club during his time there, Cools managed to make 161 appearances for the club, in which he scored 12 goals.

=== Waasland-Beveren ===
On 1 July 2016, Cools moved Waasland-Beveren after having been convinced by their manager Stijn Vreven. Cools signed a two-year contract. He made 51 appearances for the club during his two seasons there, in which he scored two goals.

=== Pafos ===
After two seasons, he chose to accept an offer from Cypriot club Pafos. He experienced a strong season there in which he scored six goals in 25 appearances.

=== Eupen ===
After playing in Cyprus for one season, Cools expressed a wish to return to his home country. On 16 July 2019, Eupen announced that he had signed a three-year contract with them. In his first season there, he made 27 appearances and scored one goal.

In October 2020, he tested positive for SARS‑CoV‑2 during the COVID-19 pandemic. Despite being sidelined for some time with the disease, Cools made 26 appearances and scored one goal during the 2020–21 season, as Eupen finished mid-table in a disappointing 12th place.

=== Al-Riyadh ===
On 26 July 2022, Cools joined Saudi Arabian club Al-Riyadh. In December 2022, he was released by the club due to repeated injuries.

=== Lierse ===
On 7 January 2023, Cools signed a year-and-a-half contract with Lierse.

== International career ==
Cools was called into the Belgian under-21 squad in March 2011. He made his debut for the Belgium under-21s on 24 March, replacing Luis Pedro Cavanda in the 82nd minute of a 1–0 win against Scotland.

== Career statistics ==
=== Club ===
As of 18 May 2019

Club	Season	League			National Cup		League Cup		Continental		Total	
Club	Season	Division	Apps	Goals	Apps	Goals	Apps	Goals	Apps	Goals	Apps	Goals
Westerlo	2010–11	Pro League	21	0	5	0	–	–	–	–	26	0
Westerlo	2011–12	Pro League	15	0	0	0	–	–	1	0	16	0
Westerlo	2012–13	Proximus League	26	3	2	0	–	–	–	–	28	3
Westerlo	2013–14	Proximus League	29	3	4	2	–	–	–	–	33	5
Westerlo	2014–15	Pro League	28	0	0	0	–	–	–	–	28	0
Westerlo	2015–16	Pro League	28	4	2	0	–	–	–	–	30	4
Westerlo	Total		147	10	13	2	0	0	1	0	161	12
Waasland-Beveren	2016–17	First Division A	36	4	1	0	–	–	–	–	37	4
Waasland-Beveren	2017–18	First Division A	13	1	1	0	–	–	–	–	14	1
Waasland-Beveren	Total		49	5	2	0	0	0	0	0	51	5
Pafos	2018–19	Cypriot First Division	25	6	3	1	–	–	–	–	28	7
Career total			221	21	18	3	0	0	1	0	240	24
