= Yair Castro =

Colombian footballer (born 1997)

Personal information
- Full name: Yair Isaac Castro Rodríguez
- Date of birth: 10 April 1997 (age 29)
- Place of birth: Bogotá, Colombia
- Height: 1.72 m (5 ft 7 1/2 in)
- Position: Winger

Team information
- Current team: Anagennisi Karditsa
- Number: 27

Senior career*
Years	Team	Apps	(Gls)
2016–2017	Doxa Katokopias	26	(3)
2018	Ethnikos Achna	3	(0)
2018–2020	1º Dezembro	50	(15)
2020–2021	Leixões	1	(0)
2020–2021	→ Trofense (loan)	15	(0)
2021–2022	PO Xylotymbou	20	(5)
2022–2023	MEAP Nisou	24	(3)
2023–2024	AEZ Zakakiou	37	(8)
2024–2025	Bnei Yehuda	17	(3)
2025	Hapoel Kfar Shalem	10	(2)
2025–2026	Akritas Chlorakas	28	(2)
2026–	Anagennisi Karditsa	0	(0)
- * Club domestic league appearances and goals as of 14 June 2026

Yair Isaac Castro Rodríguez (born 10 April 1997) is a Colombian footballer who plays as a midfielder for Super League Greece 2 club Anagennisi Karditsa.

== Career statistics ==
=== Club ===
As of 19 July 2019.

Club	Season	League			Cup		Other		Total	
Club	Season	Division	Apps	Goals	Apps	Goals	Apps	Goals	Apps	Goals
Doxa	2016–17	Cypriot First Division	25	3	6 (Note: Appearances in the Cypriot Cup)	0	0	0	31	3
Doxa	2017–18	Cypriot First Division	1	0	0	0	0	0	1	0
Doxa	Total		26	3	6	0	0	0	32	3
Ethnikos Achna	2017–18	Cypriot First Division	3	0	0	0	0	0	3	0
1º Dezembro	2018–19	Campeonato de Portugal	27	6	1 (Note: Appearances in the Taça de Portugal)	0	0	0	28	6
Career total			56	9	7	0	0	0	63	9
