= Marcolino (footballer) =

Brazilian footballer (born 1996)

Personal information
- Full name: Marcolino Neto Silva Lima de Sá
- Date of birth: 17 May 1996 (age 30)
- Place of birth: Fronteira, Brazil
- Height: 1.78 m (5 ft 10 in)
- Position: Midfielder

Team information
- Current team: Levadiakos
- Number: 96

Youth career
- –2014: Primavera
- 2014–2015: Paulínia
- 2015–2016: Guarani

Senior career*
Years	Team	Apps	(Gls)
2017	Primavera	18	(4)
2018	Rondoniense		
2018–2019	Apollon Larissa	26	(4)
2019	Othellos Athienou	8	(0)
2020	Egaleo	3	(0)
2020	Levadiakos	0	(0)
2020–2021	Bylis	1	(0)
2022–2023	Club Destroyers	4	(1)
2023–	Al-Ahli Manama		
- * Club domestic league appearances and goals as of 18:02, 18 August 2020 (UTC)

Marcolino Neto Silva Lima de Sá (born 17 May 1996), commonly known as Marcolino or Neto Marcolino, is a Brazilian professional footballer who plays as a midfielder for Bahrani side Al-Ahli Manama.

== Career statistics ==
=== Club ===
As of 22 July 2023

Appearances and goals by club, season and competition
Club	Season	League			Cup		Other		Total	
Club	Season	Division	Apps	Goals	Apps	Goals	Apps	Goals	Apps	Goals
Primavera	2017	–			0	0	18 (Note: Appearances in the Campeonato Paulista Segunda Divisão)	4	18	4
Apollon Larissa	2018–19	Superleague 2	26	4	2 (Note: Appearances in the Greek Cup)	0	—		28	4
Othellos Athienou	2019–20	Cypriot Second Division	8	0	1	0	—		8	0
Egaleo	2019–20	Football League	3	0	0	0	—		3	0
Levadiakos	2020–21	Super League Greece 2	0	0	0	0	—		0	0
Bylis	2020–21	Kategoria Superiore	1	0	0	0	—		1	0
Club Destroyers	2022	Copa Simón Bolívar	4	1	0	0	9 (Note: Appearances in the Copa Simón Bolívar playoffs)	1	13	2
Career total			42	5	3	0	27	5	72	10
