= Panagiotis Zachariou =

Cypriot footballer (born 1996)

Personal information
- Full name: Panagiotis Zachariou
- Date of birth: 26 February 1996 (age 30)
- Place of birth: Paphos, Cyprus
- Height: 1.76 m (5 ft 9 in)
- Position: Winger

Team information
- Current team: Omonia 29M
- Number: 17

Senior career*
| Years | Team | Apps | (Gls) |
| 2014–2019 | Pafos | 32 | (0) |
| 2019–2021 | Olympiakos Nicosia | 38 | (10) |
| 2021–2024 | Omonia | 43 | (2) |
| 2024–2025 | AEL Limassol | 20 | (0) |
| 2025–2026 | Omonia Aradippou | 14 | (0) |
| 2026– | Omonia 29M | 5 | (1) |

International career^{‡}
| 2018 | Cyprus U21 | 1 | (0) |
| 2018– | Cyprus | 9 | (1) |
- * Club domestic league appearances and goals as of 15 September 2026 ‡ National team caps and goals as of 04:20, 20 November 2019 (UTC)

Panagiotis Zachariou (Greek: Παναγιώτης Ζαχαρίου; born 26 February 1996) is a Cypriot professional footballer who plays as a winger for Omonia 29M and the Cyprus national team. He has previously played for Pafos, Olympiakos Nicosia, Omonia, AEL Limassol and Omonia Aradippou.

== International career ==
Zachariou made his international debut for Cyprus on 16 November 2018, starting in the 2018–19 UEFA Nations League C match against Bulgaria. He opened the scoring for Cyprus in the 24th minute, before being substituted out in the 67th minute for Onisiforos Roushias. The match finished as a 1–1 home draw.

== Career statistics ==
=== Club ===
As of 14 January 2024

| Club | Season | League | | | Cup | | Continental | | Other | | Total | |
| Club | Season | Division | Apps | Goals | Apps | Goals | Apps | Goals | Apps | Goals | Apps | Goals |
|---|---|---|---|---|---|---|---|---|---|---|---|---|
| Pafos | 2015–16 | Cypriot First Division | 8 | 0 | 0 | 0 | — | | — | | 8 | 0 |
| Pafos | 2016–17 | Cypriot First Division | 0 | 0 | 0 | 0 | — | | — | | 0 | 0 |
| Pafos | 2017–18 | Cypriot First Division | 11 | 0 | 3 | 0 | — | | — | | 14 | 0 |
| Pafos | 2018–19 | Cypriot First Division | 13 | 0 | 1 | 0 | — | | — | | 14 | 0 |
| Pafos | Total | | 32 | 0 | 4 | 0 | — | | — | | 36 | 0 |
| Olympiakos Nicosia | 2018–19 | Cypriot First Division | 18 | 6 | 0 | 0 | — | | — | | 18 | 6 |
| Olympiakos Nicosia | 2020–21 | Cypriot First Division | 20 | 4 | 3 | 0 | — | | — | | 23 | 4 |
| Olympiakos Nicosia | Total | | 38 | 10 | 3 | 0 | — | | — | | 41 | 10 |
| Omonia | 2021–22 | Cypriot First Division | 19 | 1 | 4 | 0 | 7 | 0 | — | | 30 | 1 |
| Omonia | 2022–23 | Cypriot First Division | 16 | 1 | 3 | 0 | 2 | 0 | — | | 21 | 1 |
| Omonia | 2023–24 | Cypriot First Division | 8 | 0 | 1 | 0 | 1 | 0 | 1 | 0 | 11 | 0 |
| Omonia | Total | | 43 | 2 | 8 | 0 | 10 | 0 | 1 | 0 | 62 | 2 |
| AEL Limassol | 2024–25 | Cypriot First Division | 20 | 0 | 2 | 2 | — | | — | | 22 | 2 |
| Career total | | | 133 | 12 | 17 | 2 | 10 | 0 | 1 | 0 | 161 | 14 |

=== International ===
As of 19 November 2018

Cyprus
| Year | Apps | Goals |
|---|---|---|
| 2018 | 2 | 1 |
| Total | 2 | 1 |

=== International goals ===
As of 16 November 2018. Scores and results list Cyprus' goal tally first.

| No. | Date | Venue | Opponent | Score | Result | Competition |
|---|---|---|---|---|---|---|
| 1 | 16 November 2018 | GSP Stadium, Nicosia, Cyprus | Bulgaria | 1–0 | 1–1 | 2018–19 UEFA Nations League C |

== Honours ==
Omonia

- Cypriot Cup: 2021–22, 2022–23
