= Deniss Rakels =

Latvian footballer

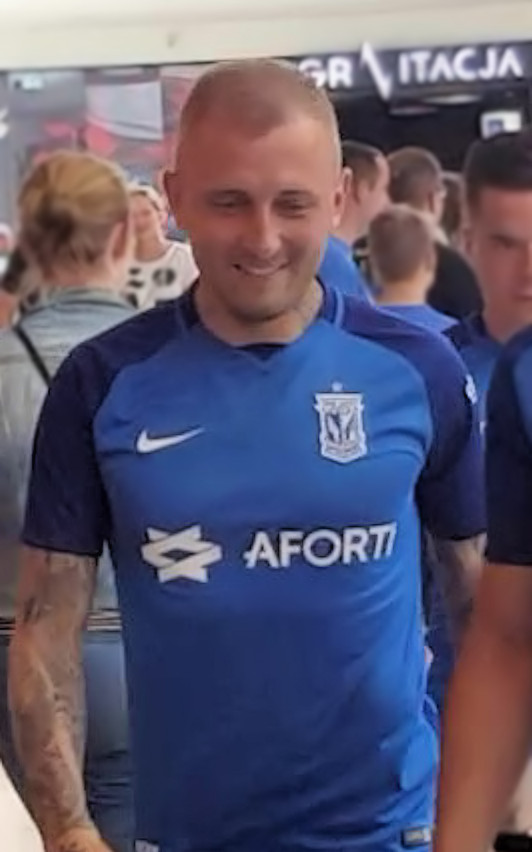
- Deniss Rakels in 2017

Personal information
- Full name: Deniss Rakels
- Date of birth: 20 August 1992 (age 34)
- Place of birth: Jēkabpils, Latvia
- Height: 1.79 m (5 ft 10 1/2 in)
- Position: Forward

Team information
- Current team: Mławianka Mława

Youth career
- Jēkabpils RSS
- Jēkabpils SC

Senior career*
Years	Team	Apps	(Gls)
2007–2009	Liepājas Metalurgs-2		
2009–2010	Liepājas Metalurgs	40	(27)
2011–2014	Zagłębie Lubin	9	(0)
2011–2013	→ GKS Katowice (loan)	47	(16)
2014–2016	Cracovia	61	(26)
2016–2018	Reading	14	(3)
2017–2018	→ Lech Poznań (loan)	11	(0)
2018	→ Cracovia (loan)	12	(1)
2018–2021	Pafos	48	(3)
2018	→ Riga (loan)	12	(2)
2019	→ Riga (loan)	12	(3)
2021–2023	RFS	27	(10)
2023	Super Nova	15	(4)
2023–2025	Hutnik Kraków	48	(12)
2025	Zagłębie Sosnowiec	24	(2)
2026	Polonia Nysa	0	(0)
2026–	Mławianka Mława	0	(0)

International career
2008	Latvia U17	3	(0)
2010	Latvia U19	3	(0)
2011–2013	Latvia U21	8	(3)
2010–2019	Latvia	32	(1)
- * Club domestic league appearances and goals as of 21:54, 3 June 2026 (UTC)

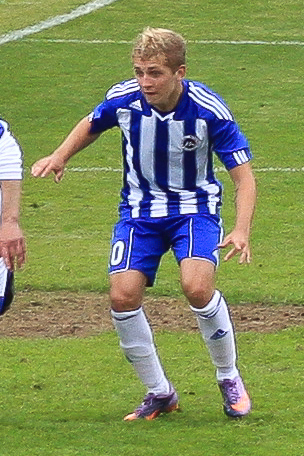
Rakels playing for Liepājas Metalurgs

Deniss Rakeļs (born 20 August 1992) is a Latvian professional footballer who plays as a forward for III liga club Mławianka Mława.

== Club career ==
=== Early career ===
Rakels started his youth career in his local club Jēkabpils RSS, later on moving to another club from the same city - Jēkabpils SC. In 2007, he left, signing for Liepājas Metalurgs-2 in the Latvian First League. While playing for the reserve team of Metalurgs, he was an outstanding team leader - he scored regularly and was impressive with his speed to finish the through balls. In 2009, only 17 years old, he was taken to the first team by that time Liepājas Metalurgs manager Rüdiger Abramczik. He had no difficulties to fit into the first team level soon after joining, becoming a regular first eleven player. Even more - he scored in nearly every appearance. In fact, just after a few appearances Rakels had already completed 2 league hat-tricks. His technique and footballing skills impressed many coaches all around the world, despite him being just 18. In December 2009 he went on trial with the Italian Serie A side Sampdoria. In April 2010 he joined Swiss Super League team Basel on trial, and in August 2010 in a league game against Ventspils he was scouted by Werder Bremen scouts.

=== Zagłębie Lubin ===
In December 2010, it was announced that Rakels would go on a training camp together with Russian Premier League giants Rubin Kazan in January 2011, but the player himself decided to reject the offer, because the Polish Ekstraklasa club Zagłębie Lubin were interested in signing him. This scenario turned out to be true and on 30 January 2011, after passing medical tests, Rakels signed a three-year contract with them. Later on the player himself admitted that till the very last day before signing a contract with Zagłębie the representatives of the Ukrainian Premier League club Karpaty Lviv had been trying to persuade him to join their club, despite several previous refusals from the player.

=== Loan to GKS Katowice ===
On 17 August 2011, Rakels was sent on a season-long loan spell to I liga club GKS Katowice to gain experience due to his limited game time in Lubin. He scored 5 goals in 20 matches for the club, returning to Zagłębie after the season. It was reported that Rakels would be loaned to GKS for another season in August 2012. In his second season with GKS Rakels scored 11 goals in 27 matches, becoming one of the league's top scorers. In July 2013 he went on trial with the English Football League Championship club Brighton & Hove Albion, but did not stay with them, despite scoring a goal in a pre-season friendly match. Before the start of the 2013–14 Ekstraklasa season Rakels returned to Zagłębie Lubin.

=== Cracovia ===
On 15 January 2014, Rakels signed a half-year contract with Cracovia, the contract was later extended.

=== Reading ===
On 28 January 2016 Rakels signed a two-and-a-half-year deal with Reading for an undisclosed fee. Rakels made his Reading debut on 6 February 2016, coming on as a 79th-minute substitute for Matěj Vydra, in their 0–0 draw with Wolverhampton Wanderers. He scored his first goal for Reading when he struck a late winner in a 4–3 win at Charlton Athletic on 27 February 2016.

Rakels was stretchered off during Reading's EFL Cup second round match against Milton Keynes Dons on 23 August 2016 with a suspected fractured ankle. This Injury kept Rakels out of first team football for the remainder of the 2016–17 season, making only a handful of Under-23 appearances.

Rakels was released by Reading at the end of his contract on 30 June 2018.

=== Loan to Lech Poznań ===
On 16 June 2017, Rakels underwent a medical with Lech Poznań ahead of a season-long loan deal. 10 days later, on 26 June 2017, Reading confirmed that Rakels had joined Lech Poznań on a season-long loan deal.

=== Loan to Cracovia ===
On 17 January 2018, Reading confirmed that Rakels' loan deal with Lech Poznań had ended, and that Rakels had joined Cracovia on loan for the remainder of the season.

=== Pafos FC ===
On 16 July 2018, Rakels signed for Cypriot First Division club Pafos, and then immediately joined Latvian Higher League club Riga on loan.

=== RFS ===
On 2 July 2021, Rakels signed for RFS on an 18-month contract.

== International career ==
Rakels was a member of the Latvia under-19 and under-21 national teams. In June 2010 he was called up to the Latvia national team for the 2010 Baltic Cup by the manager Aleksandrs Starkovs, who was impressed by the youngster's great form in the Latvian Higher League. He made his international debut on 18 June 2010 in a 0–0 draw against Lithuania, coming on as a substitute in the 75th minute and replacing Andrejs Perepļotkins.

== Career statistics ==
=== Club ===
As of match played 21 November 2025

Appearances and goals by club, season and competition
Club	Season	League			National cup (Note: Includes Latvian Cup, Polish Cup, FA Cup, Cypriot Cup)		League cup (Note: Includes EFL Cup)		Continental		Other		Total	
Club	Season	Division	Apps	Goals	Apps	Goals	Apps	Goals	Apps	Goals	Apps	Goals	Apps	Goals
Liepājas Metalurgs	2009	Virslīga	14	9			—		1 (Note: Appearances in UEFA Europa League)	0	—		15	9
Liepājas Metalurgs	2010	Virsliga	26	18	1	0	—		2 (Note: Appearances in UEFA Champions League)	0	—		29	18
Liepājas Metalurgs	Total		40	27	1	0	—		3	0	—		44	27
Zagłębie Lubin	2010–11	Ekstraklasa	4	0	0	0	—		—		—		4	0
Zagłębie Lubin	2013–14	Ekstraklasa	5	0	0	0	—		—		—		5	0
Zagłębie Lubin	Total		9	0	0	0	—		—		—		9	0
Zagłębie Lubin II	2013–14	III liga, gr. E	5	6	—		—		—		—		5	6
GKS Katowice (loan)	2011–12	I liga	20	5	0	0	—		—		—		20	5
GKS Katowice (loan)	2012–13	I liga	27	11	0	0	—		—		—		27	11
GKS Katowice (loan)	Total		47	16	0	0	—		—		—		47	16
Cracovia	2013–14	Ekstraklasa	8	0	0	0	—		—		—		8	0
Cracovia	2014–15	Ekstraklasa	33	11	3	1	—		—		—		36	12
Cracovia	2015–16	Ekstraklasa	20	15	4	1	—		—		—		24	16
Cracovia	Total		61	26	7	2	—		—		—		68	28
Reading	2015–16	Championship	12	3	2	0	0	0	—		—		14	3
Reading	2016–17	Championship	2	0	0	0	1	0	—		—		3	0
Reading	2017–18	Championship	0	0	0	0	0	0	—		—		0	0
Reading	Total		14	3	2	0	1	0	—		—		17	3
Lech Poznań (loan)	2017–18	Ekstraklasa	11	0	0	0	—		3	0	—		14	0
Cracovia (loan)	2017–18	Ekstraklasa	12	1	0	0	—		—		—		12	1
Pafos	2018–19	Cypriot First Division	17	1	4	0	—		—		—		21	1
Pafos	2019–20	Cypriot First Division	8	1	1	0	—		—		—		9	1
Pafos	2020–21	Cypriot First Division	23	1	2	0	—		—		—		9	1
Pafos	Total		48	3	7	0	—		—		—		55	3
Riga (loan)	2018	Virsliga	12	2	3	1	—		—		—		15	3
Riga (loan)	2019	Virsliga	12	3	2	0	—		7 (Note: Two appearances in UEFA Champions League, five appearances in UEFA Europa League)	0	—		21	3
Riga (loan)	Total		24	5	5	1	—		7	0	—		36	6
RFS	2021	Virsliga	7	0	4	0	—		1 (Note: Appearance(s) in UEFA Europa Conference League)	0	—		12	0
RFS	2022	Virsliga	20	10	3	3	—		8	0	—		31	13
RFS	Total		27	10	7	3	—		9	0	—		43	13
Super Nova	2023	Virsliga	15	4	0	0	—		—		—		15	4
Hutnik Kraków	2023–24	II liga	33	11	1	0	—		—		—		34	11
Hutnik Kraków	2024–25	II liga	15	1	1	1	—		—		—		16	2
Hutnik Kraków	Total		48	12	2	1	—		—		—		50	13
Zagłębie Sosnowiec	2024–25	II liga	11	1	—		—		—		—		11	1
Zagłębie Sosnowiec	2025–26	II liga	13	1	1	0	—		—		—		14	1
Zagłębie Sosnowiec	Total		24	2	1	0	—		—		—		25	2
Polonia Nysa	2025–26	III liga, group III	0	0	—		—		—		—		0	0
Mławianka Mława	2026–27	III liga, group I	0	0	—		—		—		—		0	0
Career total			385	115	32	7	1	0	22	0	0	0	440	122

=== International ===
Appearances and goals by national team and year
National team	Year	Apps	Goals
Latvia
Latvia	2010	2	0
Latvia	2013	3	0
Latvia	2014	1	0
Latvia	2015	8	0
Latvia	2017	7	0
Latvia	2018	6	1
Latvia	2019	5	0
Total		32	1

Scores and results list Latvia's goal tally first, score column indicates score after each Rakels goal.

List of international goals scored by Deniss Rakels
No.	Date	Venue	Opponent	Score	Result	Competition
1	15 November 2018	Astana Arena, Astana, Kazakhstan	Kazakhstan	1–1	1–1	2018–19 UEFA Nations League D

== Personal life ==
Rakels is of Polish descent. He has many tattoos on his body, they include his name, his mother's name, and a wish for his parents written in Arabic.

== Honours ==
Liepājas Metalurgs

- Virsliga: 2009

Riga

- Virsliga: 2018, 2019
- Latvian Cup: 2018

RFS

- Virsliga: 2021
- Latvian Cup: 2021

Individual

- Virsliga top scorer: 2010
- Polish Union of Footballers' II liga Team of the Season: 2023–24
