= Angelis Angeli =

Cypriot footballer

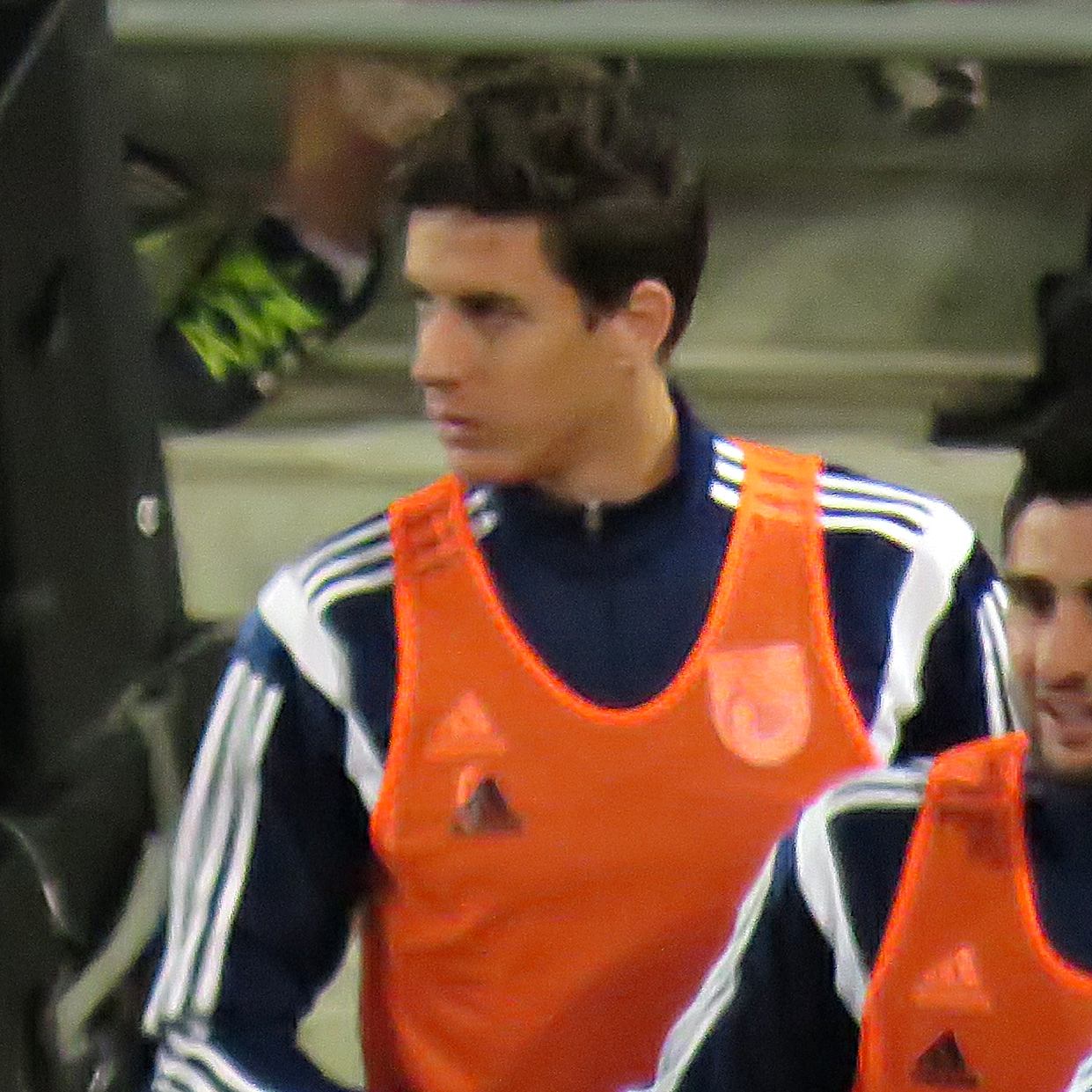

Personal information
- Full name: Angelis Angeli Charalampous
- Date of birth: 31 May 1989 (age 37)
- Place of birth: Larnaca, Cyprus
- Height: 1.89 m (6 ft 2 in)
- Positions: Right-back; centre back

Team information
- Current team: Omonia 29M
- Number: 23

Senior career*
Years	Team	Apps	(Gls)
2008–2010	Anorthosis Famagusta	1	(0)
2010–2011	Motherwell	0	(0)
2011–2012	Ermis Aradippou	21	(0)
2012–2018	Apollon Limassol	74	(4)
2018–2020	Enosis Neon Paralimni	28	(0)
2021	IFK Mariehamn	0	(0)
2021–2024	Karmiotissa	44	(1)
2024–2025	AEZ Zakakiou	22	(6)
2025–	Omonia 29M	23	(2)

International career^{‡}
2009–2010	Cyprus U21	8	(1)
2011–2013	Cyprus	9	(0)
- * Club domestic league appearances and goals as of 20 June 2024 ‡ National team caps and goals as of 3 May 2026

Angelis Angeli Charalampous (Greek: Αγγελής Αγγελή Χαραλάμπους; born 31 May 1989) is a Cypriot professional footballer who plays as a centre back for Omonia 29M and Cyprus national team.

== Club career ==
Angeli had played most of his early career as a youth for Anorthosis Famagusta before the move to Scotland. He was signed by Motherwell in June 2010 after impressing the youth coaches when Motherwell's reserve team played a succession of friendlies in Cyprus. Angeli signed a one-year contract with the option of a further year. He was on the bench for Motherwell's Europa League tie with Breiðablik, although he was an unused substitute in that match. He was released by Motherwell on 1 June 2011 having never played a first team match for the club.

== International career ==
Angeli has earned four caps for the Cyprus U21 football team, the first of which came against Slovakia in September 2009. He has been a regular starter for the under-21 side ever since.

== Personal life ==
Angeli was a tank commander in the army prior to his move to Scotland.
