= Yoann Tribeau =

French professional footballer (born 1988)

Personal information
- Full name: Yoann Tribeau
- Date of birth: February 26, 1988 (age 38)
- Place of birth: Villeneuve-Saint-Georges, France
- Height: 1.80 m (5 ft 11 in)
- Position: Attacking midfielder

Youth career
- Alfortville UJA
- Paris Saint-Germain

Senior career*
Years	Team	Apps	(Gls)
2005–2006	Paris Saint-Germain B	1	(0)
2006–2010	Angers	7	(0)
2008–2009	→ Calais RUFC (loan)		
2010	→ US Luzenac (loan)	17	(1)
2010–2012	AS Beauvais	58	(11)
2012–2014	AS Cherbourg	16	(2)
2014–2015	US Créteil	14	(0)
2015–2016	Othellos Athienou	23	(6)
2016–2017	Alki Oroklini	36	(7)
2018	Olympiakos Nicosia	14	(1)
2018	Othellos Athienou	4	(0)
2019	Alki Oroklini	17	(0)
2019–2020	Ayia Napa	18	(2)
2020	Omonia Aradippou	9	(0)
2021–2022	Achyronas Liopetriou	36	(1)
- * Club domestic league appearances and goals as of 21:26, 8 November 2023 (UTC)

Yoann Tribeau (born February 26, 1988, in Villeneuve-Saint-Georges) is a French professional footballer who plays as an attacking midfielder.

== Career ==
Tribeau joined Ayia Napa FC on 16 July 2019.
