= Thiago Santos (footballer, born 1987) =

Brazilian footballer

Personal information
- Full name: Thiago Ferreira dos Santos
- Date of birth: 12 July 1987 (age 39)
- Place of birth: Linhares, Brazil
- Height: 1.78 m (5 ft 10 in)
- Position: Forward

Team information
- Current team: Krasava ENY Ypsonas FC

Youth career
- Coritiba

Senior career*
| Years | Team | Apps | (Gls) |
| 2006–2008 | Coritiba | | |
| 2008 | Rio Claro | | |
| 2009 | Friburguense | 9 | (3) |
| 2009 | Duque de Caxias | 16 | (2) |
| 2010–2011 | AEP Paphos | 13 | (1) |
| 2012 | Ulsan Hyundai Mipo Dolphin | 21 | (8) |
| 2013 | Cianorte | 19 | (5) |
| 2014 | Campinense | 10 | (10) |
| 2014–2015 | Othellos | 27 | (10) |
| 2015 | Lierse | 12 | (1) |
| 2016 | Maccabi Netanya | 2 | (0) |
| 2017–2018 | Ubon UMT United | 15 | (7) |
| 2018–2019 | Nea Salamina | 41 | (18) |
| 2019–2021 | Omonia | 52 | (7) |
| 2021–2022 | AEK Larnaca | 5 | (0) |
| 2022 | → Olympiakos Nicosia (loan) | 11 | (2) |
| 2022–2023 | Nea Salamina | 29 | (5) |
| 2023– | Krasava ENY Ypsonas FC | 28 | (6) |
- * Club domestic league appearances and goals as of 10 June 2024

Thiago Ferreira dos Santos, commonly known as Thiago Santos, is a Brazilian footballer who plays as forward.

== Honours ==
Omonia

- Cypriot First Division: 2020–21
