= Zdeněk Folprecht (footballer) =

Czech footballer

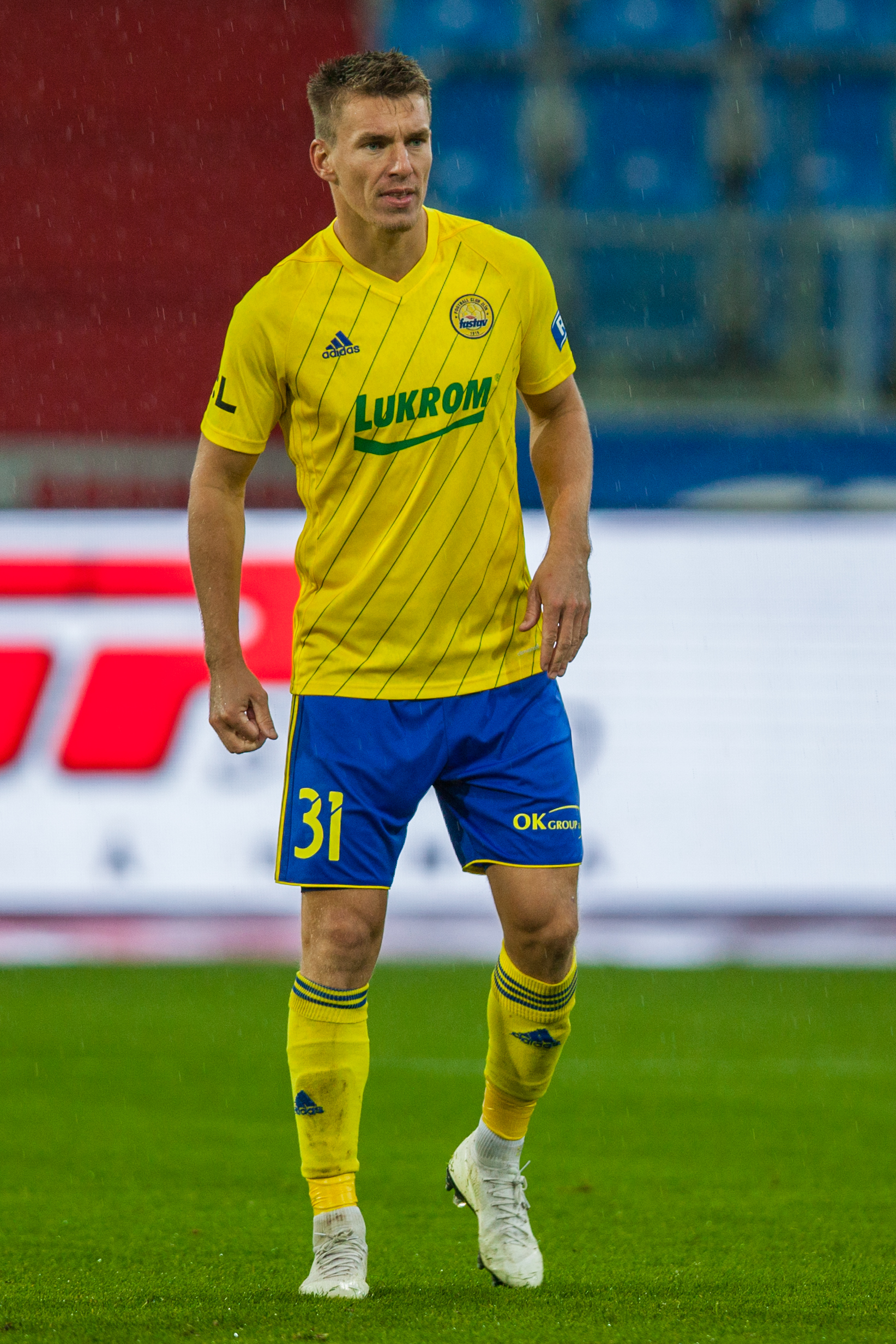
- Folprecht in 2019

Personal information
- Date of birth: 7 January 1991 (age 35)
- Place of birth: Kladno, Czechoslovakia
- Height: 1.81 m (5 ft 11 in)
- Position: Midfielder

Team information
- Current team: Vlašim

Youth career
- 1995–2000: TJ Baník Stochov
- 2000–2001: HFK Olomouc
- 2001–2009: Sparta Prague

Senior career*
Years	Team	Apps	(Gls)
2010–2015	Sparta Prague	1	(0)
2010	→ Viktoria Žižkov (loan)	14	(1)
2011	→ Zbrojovka Brno (loan)	6	(0)
2011	→ Viktoria Žižkov (loan)	12	(0)
2013–2015	→ Viktoria Žižkov (loan)	8	(0)
2015–2018	Slovan Liberec	59	(3)
2017	→ Neftchi Baku (loan)	11	(0)
2018–2020	Pafos	37	(1)
2019	→ Zlín (loan)	8	(0)
2020	Příbram	10	(1)
2021	Ermis Aradippou	19	(2)
2021–2022	Ethnikos Achna	14	(3)
2022	Pistoiese	11	(0)
2022–	Vlašim	3	(0)

International career
2009–2010	Czech Republic U19	15	(2)
2012	Czech Republic U21	1	(0)
- * Club domestic league appearances and goals as of 19 June 2023

Zdeněk Folprecht (born 1 July 1991) is a Czech professional footballer who plays as a midfielder for Czech National Football League club Vlašim.

== Career ==
Folprecht joined Viktoria Žižkov on loan for a second spell in June 2011.

Folprecht joined Slovan Liberec in June 2015.

On 25 February 2022, he moved to Italy and signed with Serie C club Pistoiese.
