= Luca Polizzi =

Belgian association football player

Personal information
- Date of birth: 28 May 1996 (age 30)
- Place of birth: Brussels, Belgium
- Height: 1.75 m (5 ft 9 in)
- Position: Midfielder

Team information
- Current team: RSD Jette
- Number: 96

Senior career*
Years	Team	Apps	(Gls)
2015–2016	Genk	0	(0)
2015–2016	→ MVV (loan)	33	(5)
2016–2017	Inter Zaprešić	19	(0)
2017–2019	Apollon Limassol	1	(0)
2017–2018	→ Olympiakos Nicosia (loan)	18	(5)
2018–2019	→ Pafos (loan)	9	(0)
2019–2022	Rupel Boom	51	(6)
2022–2023	Ninove	33	(2)
2023–2024	RUS Rebecq	26	(2)
2024–2025	Tournai	24	(0)
2025–	RSD Jette	0	(0)
- * Club domestic league appearances and goals as of 21 January 2026

Luca Polizzi (born 28 May 1996) is a Belgian professional footballer who plays as a midfielder for RSD Jette.

== Career ==
In 2016, Polizzi signed with NK Inter Zaprešić in Croatia, making 19 league appearances there.

After playing for Cypriot clubs Apollon Limassol, Olympiakos Nicosia, and Pafos, he expressed desire to return to Belgium to be closer with his family.
