= Brayan Angulo (footballer, born 1993) =

Colombian footballer

Personal information
- Full name: Brayan Edinson Angulo Mosquera
- Date of birth: 19 July 1993 (age 33)
- Place of birth: Cali, Colombia
- Height: 1.70 m (5 ft 7 in)
- Position: Attacking midfielder

Team information
- Current team: Babrungas

Senior career*
Years	Team	Apps	(Gls)
2011	Deportivo Cali	2	(0)
2012–2013	Cortuluá	50	(6)
2014–2016	Rionegro	31	(5)
2015	→ Independiente Medellín (loan)	37	(2)
2016	Deportivo Pasto	9	(1)
2016–2019	América de Cali	62	(6)
2018	→ Independiente Medellín (loan)	6	(0)
2018–2019	→ Pafos (loan)	29	(9)
2019–2020	Independiente Medellín	0	(0)
2020–2021	Pafos	16	(1)
2020	→ Riga (loan)	3	(0)
2021–2022	Once Caldas	3	(0)
2022	Botafogo	9	(3)
2022–2024	Al-Merrikh		
2024	Boca Juniors de Cali	11	(0)
2025	Madura United	14	(0)
2026–	Babrungas	2	(0)

International career
2013	Colombia U21	5	(0)
- * Club domestic league appearances and goals as of 20 March 2026

Brayan Edinson Angulo Mosquera (born 19 July 1993) is a Colombian professional footballer who plays as an attacking midfielder for I Lyga club Babrungas.

== Career ==
On 24 January 2020, Angulo signed permanently for Pafos from Independiente Medellín having previously played for the club during the 2018–19 season.

== Club statistics ==
As of match played 24 May 2025.

Club	Season	League			Cup		Continental		Other		Total	
Club	Season	Division	Apps	Goals	Apps	Goals	Apps	Goals	Apps	Goals	Apps	Goals
Cortuluá
Cortuluá	2012	Categoría Primera B	27	4	6	0	—		—		0	0
Cortuluá	2013	Categoría Primera B	23	2	5	1	—		—		28	3
Cortuluá	Total		50	6	11	1	0	0	0	0	61	7
Rionegro	2014	Categoría Primera A	31	5	6	0	1 (Note: Includes appearances in Copa Sudamericana)	0	—		38	5
Medellín (loan)	2015	Categoría Primera A	37	2	8	2	—		—		45	4
Deportivo Pasto	2016	Categoría Primera A	9	1	3	1	—		—		12	2
América de Cali	2016	Categoría Primera B	22	4	1	0	—		—		23	4
América de Cali	2017	Categoría Primera A	37	1	3	0	—		—		40	1
América de Cali	2018	Categoría Primera A	3	1	1	0	—		—		4	1
América de Cali	Total		62	6	5	0	0	0	0	0	67	6
Medellín (loan)	2018	Categoría Primera A	6	0	0	0	0	0	—		6	0
Pafos (loan)	2018–19	Cypriot First Division	29	9	5	1	—		—		34	10
Medellín	2019	Categoría Primera A	0	0	0	0	0	0	—		0	0
Pafos	2019–20	Cypriot First Division	2	0	0	0	—		—		2	0
Pafos	2020–21	Cypriot First Division	14	1	0	0	—		—		14	1
Pafos	Total		16	1	0	0	0	0	0	0	16	1
Riga (loan)	2020	Virslīga	3	0	0	0	—		—		3	0
Once Caldas	2021	Categoría Primera A	3	0	1	0	—		—		4	0
Botafogo-BA	2022	Campeonato Baiano Second Division	9	3	—		—		—		9	3
Al-Merrikh	2022–23	Sudan Premier League	—		—		6 (Note: Includes appearances in CAF Champions League)	0	2 (Note: Appearances in Arab Club Champions Cup)	0	8	0
Boca Juniors de Cali	2024	Categoría Primera B	11	0	—		—		—		11	0
Madura United	2024–25	Liga 1	14	0	—		3 (Note: Appearances in AFC Challenge League)	0	—		17	0
Career total			280	33	39	5	10	0	2	0	329	38

== Honours ==
América

- Categoría Primera B: 2016
