= 2017–18 Pafos FC season =

Pafos
2017–18 season
- Owner: Pavel Gognidze
- Manager: Luka Elsner (until 21 January); Steven Pressley (from 31 January)
- Stadium: Stelios Kyriakides Stadium
- Cyta Championship: 10th
- Cypriot Cup: Semifinal vs Apollon Limassol
- Top goalscorer: League: Two Players (7); All: Daniel Sikorski (11)
Home colours	Away colours

The 2017–18 season was Pafos's 4th year in existence, and first season back in the Cypriot First Division following their relegation at the end of the 2015–16 season. Pafos finished the season in 10th position and reached the Semifinals of the Cypriot Cup where they were knocked out by Apollon Limassol.

== Season review ==
On 14 December, Pafos announced the signing of Dmitri Torbinski on a contract starting 1 January.

== Squad ==
As of match played 13 May 2018

No.	Name	Nationality	Position	Date of birth (age)	Signed from	Signed in	Contract ends	Apps.	Goals
Goalkeepers
78	Léonard Aggoune	(France)	GK	18 December 1997 (aged 20)	Paris Saint-Germain	2017			
88	Jan Koprivec	(Slovenia)	GK	15 July 1988 (aged 29)	Anorthosis Famagusta	2017			
90	Andreas Vassiliou	(Cyprus)	GK	6 June 1996 (aged 21)	Ermis Aradippou	2017			
Defenders
2	Biel Company	(Spain)	DF	16 February 1992 (aged 26)	RCD Mallorca	2017			
3	Savvas Pikramenos	(Cyprus)	DF	10 April 1987 (aged 31)	AEZ Zakakiou	2016			
4	Lucas Domínguez	(Chile)	DF	27 October 1989 (aged 28)	Unión Española	2017			
6	Kenan Horić	(Bosnia and Herzegovina)	DF	13 September 1990 (aged 27)	on loan from Antalyaspor	2017			
13	Vladislavs Gabovs	(Latvia)	DF	13 July 1987 (aged 30)	Korona Kielce	2017			
28	Nicolas Taravel	(France)	DF	13 October 1994 (aged 23)	GNK Dinamo Zagreb	2017			
64	Erik Janža	(Slovenia)	DF	21 June 1993 (aged 24)	on loan from Viktoria Plzeň	2017			
93	Hérold Goulon	(France)	DF	12 June 1988 (aged 29)	Doxa Katokopias	2017			
96	Aleksandr Dovbnya	(Russia)	DF	14 February 1996 (aged 22)	Ethnikos Achna	2018			
Midfielders
5	Georgios Christodoulou	(Cyprus)	MF	17 August 1997 (aged 20)	on loan from APOEL Nicosia	2017			
7	Diego Poyet	(Uruguay)	MF	8 April 1995 (aged 23)	Godoy Cruz	2017			
12	Boy Deul	(Netherlands)	MF	30 August 1987 (aged 30)	Stal Kamianske	2017			
15	Kyriakos Antoniou	(Cyprus)	MF	3 May 2001 (aged 17)	Academy	2017			
20	Andreas Stavrou	(Cyprus)	MF	27 October 1988 (aged 29)	Karmiotissa	2017			
21	Rafael Yiangoudakis	(Cyprus)	MF	3 August 1990 (aged 27)	Athens Kallithea	2017			
23	Gerasimos Fylaktou	(Cyprus)	MF	24 July 1991 (aged 26)	on loan from AC Omonia	2017			
27	Ante Roguljić	(Croatia)	MF	11 March 1996 (aged 22)	Red Bull Salzburg	2017			
33	Jeff Callebaut	(Belgium)	MF	23 January 1997 (aged 21)	Mechelen	2017			
82	Mehdi Mostefa	(Algeria)	MF	30 August 1983 (aged 34)	Unattached	2017			
Forwards
9	Daniel Sikorski	(Austria)	FW	2 November 1987 (aged 30)	Gaz Metan Mediaș	2017			
10	Christian Brüls	(Belgium)	FW	30 September 1988 (aged 29)	Eupen	2017			
11	Panagiotis Zachariou	(Cyprus)	FW	26 February 1996 (aged 22)	AE Pafos	2014			
31	Valdo	(Brazil)	FW	8 February 1988 (aged 30)	Air Force United	2017			
56	Charalambos Demosthenous	(Cyprus)	FW	16 April 1990 (aged 28)	Aris Limassol	2015			
74	Kévin Bérigaud	(France)	FW	9 May 1988 (aged 30)	Montpellier	2018			
Out on loan
Left during the season
8	Mitja Lotrič	(Slovenia)	FW	3 September 1994 (aged 23)	Rudar Velenje	2017			
14	Prosper Chiluya	(Zambia)	DF	2 April 1998 (aged 20)	on loan from Kafue Celtic	2017			
16	Artem Filimonov	(Ukraine)	MF	21 February 1994 (aged 24)	on loan from Karpaty Lviv	2017			
30	Abel Camará	(Guinea-Bissau)	FW	6 January 1990 (aged 28)	Belenenses	2017			
34	Antonijs Černomordijs	(Latvia)	DF	26 September 1996 (aged 21)	on loan from Riga	2017			
80	Dmitri Torbinski	(Russia)	MF	28 April 1984 (aged 34)	Unattached	2017		3	0
97	Bohdan Kovalenko	(Ukraine)	FW	24 April 1997 (aged 21)	Chaika Petropavlivska Borshchahivka	2017			

=== Out on loan ===
Note: Flags indicate national team as defined under FIFA eligibility rules; some limited exceptions apply. Players may hold more than one non-FIFA nationality.

No. / Pos. / Nation / Player	No. / Pos. / Nation / Player

=== Left club during season ===
Note: Flags indicate national team as defined under FIFA eligibility rules; some limited exceptions apply. Players may hold more than one non-FIFA nationality.

No. / Pos. / Nation / Player	No. / Pos. / Nation / Player

== Transfers ==
=== In ===
Date	Position	Nationality	Name	From	Fee	Ref.
1 July 2017	FW	(Austria)	Daniel Sikorski	Gaz Metan Mediaș	Undisclosed	
5 July 2017	MF	(Netherlands)	Boy Deul	Stal Kamianske	Undisclosed	
11 July 2017	FW	(Slovenia)	Mitja Lotrič	Rudar Velenje	Undisclosed	
16 July 2017	GK	(Cyprus)	Andreas Vasiliou	Ermis Aradippou	Undisclosed	
17 July 2017	DF	(Latvia)	Vladislavs Gabovs	Korona Kielce	Undisclosed	
24 July 2017	GK	(Slovenia)	Jan Koprivec	Anorthosis Famagusta	Undisclosed	
14 August 2017	DF	(France)	Nicolas Taravel	Dinamo Zagreb	Undisclosed	
17 August 2017	DF	(France)	Hérold Goulon	Doxa Katokopias	Undisclosed	
17 August 2017	MF	(Belgium)	Jeff Callebaut	Mechelen	Undisclosed	
17 August 2017	MF	(Cyprus)	Andreas Stavrou	Karmiotissa	Undisclosed	
22 August 2017	MF	(Croatia)	Ante Roguljić	Red Bull Salzburg	Undisclosed	
26 August 2017	GK	(France)	Léonard Aggoune	Paris Saint-Germain	Undisclosed	
29 August 2017	FW	(Belgium)	Christian Brüls	Eupen	Undisclosed	
30 August 2017	FW	(Ukraine)	Bohdan Kovalenko	Chaika Petropavlivska Borshchahivka	Undisclosed	
30 August 2017	FW	(Cyprus)	Abel Camará	Belenenses	Undisclosed	
31 August 2017	MF	(Uruguay)	Diego Poyet	Godoy Cruz	Undisclosed	
6 September 2017	DF	(Spain)	Biel Company	RCD Mallorca	Undisclosed	
7 September 2017	DF	(Chile)	Lucas Domínguez	Unión Española	Undisclosed	
7 September 2017	MF	(Algeria)	Mehdi Mostefa	Unattached	Free	
1 January 2018	MF	(Russia)	Dmitri Torbinski	Unattached	Free	
17 January 2018	FW	(France)	Kévin Bérigaud	Montpellier	Undisclosed	
31 January 2018	DF	(Russia)	Aleksandr Dovbnya	Ethnikos Achna	Undisclosed	
31 January 2018	FW	(Brazil)	Valdo	Air Force United	Undisclosed	

=== Loans in ===
Start date	Position	Nationality	Name	From	End date	Ref.
7 July 2017	MF	(Ukraine)	Artem Filimonov	Karpaty Lviv	31 December 2017	
13 July 2017	DF	(Slovenia)	Erik Janža	Viktoria Plzeň	30 June 2018	
15 July 2017	DF	(Bosnia and Herzegovina)	Kenan Horić	Antalyaspor	30 June 2018	
17 July 2017	DF	(Latvia)	Antonijs Černomordijs	Riga	31 December 2017	
24 July 2017	MF	(Cyprus)	Gerasimos Fylaktou	AC Omonia	30 June 2018	
17 August 2017	DF	(Zambia)	Prosper Chiluya	Kafue Celtic	31 December 2017	
24 August 2017	MF	(Cyprus)	Georgios Christodoulou	APOEL	30 June 2018	

=== Out ===
Date	Position	Nationality	Name	To	Fee	Ref.
10 January 2018	FW	(Slovenia)	Mitja Lotrič	NK Celje	Undisclosed	
20 March 2018	FW	(Ukraine)	Bohdan Kovalenko	Riga	Undisclosed	

=== Released ===
Date	Position	Nationality	Name	Joined	Date	Ref
31 January 2018	FW	(Guinea-Bissau)	Abel Camará	Cremonese	1 March 2018	
12 February 2018	MF	(Russia)	Dmitri Torbinski	Baltika Kaliningrad	12 February 2018	
1 June 2018	FW	(Brazil)	Valdo	Thai Honda	1 June 2018	
30 June 2018	GK	(France)	Léonard Aggoune	US Créteil-Lusitanos	1 August 2018	
30 June 2018	GK	(Cyprus)	Andreas Vassiliou	Akritas Chlorakas	1 August 2018	
30 June 2018	DF	(Spain)	Biel Company	Hermannstadt	12 July 2018	
30 June 2018	DF	(Cyprus)	Savvas Pikramenos			
30 June 2018	DF	(Chile)	Lucas Domínguez	Everton	7 July 2018	
30 June 2018	DF	(Latvia)	Vladislavs Gabovs	Riga	1 July 2018	
30 June 2018	DF	(France)	Nicolas Taravel	Grenoble	1 July 2018	
30 June 2018	DF	(France)	Hérold Goulon	Ermis Aradippou	23 August 2018	
30 June 2018	MF	(Uruguay)	Diego Poyet	Retired	23 January 2020	
30 June 2018	MF	(Netherlands)	Boy Deul	Volendam	16 August 2018	
30 June 2018	MF	(Cyprus)	Andreas Stavrou	Alki Oroklini	12 July 2018	
30 June 2018	MF	(Cyprus)	Rafael Yiangoudakis	Aris Limassol	12 August 2018	
30 June 2018	MF	(Croatia)	Ante Roguljić	AS Trenčín	14 September 2018	
30 June 2018	MF	(Belgium)	Jeff Callebaut	SC Dikkelvenne	2 August 2018	
30 June 2018	MF	(Algeria)	Mehdi Mostefa	AS Béziers	18 July 2018	
30 June 2018	FW	(Austria)	Daniel Sikorski	Nea Salamis Famagusta	1 July 2018	
30 June 2018	FW	(Belgium)	Christian Brüls	Westerlo	6 February 2019	
30 June 2018	FW	(Cyprus)	Charalambos Demosthenous	Akritas Chlorakas	1 July 2018	

== Friendlies ==
	–
EEST (UTC+3)

== Competitions ==
=== Overview ===
Competition	First match	Last match	Starting round	Final position	Record							
Competition	First match	Last match	Starting round	Final position	Pld	W	D	L	GF	GA	GD	Win %
Cyta Championship	1 September 2018	17 May 2019	Matchday 1	10th	36	11	9	16	36	51	−15	30.56
Cypriot Cup	13 December 2017	25 April 2018	First round	Semifinal	7	3	1	3	12	14	−2	42.86
Total					43	14	10	19	48	65	−17	32.56

Last updated: 17 May 2018
Source: Competitions

=== Cyta Championship ===
==== Regular season ====
===== League table =====
Pos	Team	Pld	W	D	L	GF	GA	GD	Pts	Qualification or relegation
7	Doxa Katokopias	26	10	4	12	35	40	−5	34	Qualification for the Relegation round
8	Ermis Aradippou	26	9	3	14	35	49	−14	30	Qualification for the Relegation round
9	Pafos FC	26	6	8	12	23	38	−15	26	Qualification for the Relegation round
10	Nea Salamis Famagusta	26	6	6	14	28	46	−18	24	Qualification for the Relegation round
11	Alki Oroklini	26	6	5	15	30	57	−27	23	Qualification for the Relegation round

Source: CFA (in Greek)
Rules for classification: 1) Points; 2) Head-to-head points; 3) Head-to-head goal difference; 4) Head-to-head goals scored; 5) Head-to-head away goals scored (only if two teams); 6) Goal difference; 7) Goals scored; 8) Play-off (only if deciding championship round, relegation round or relegation).

===== Results summary =====
Overall								Home						Away					
Pld	W	D	L	GF	GA	GD	Pts	W	D	L	GF	GA	GD	W	D	L	GF	GA	GD
26	6	8	12	23	38	−15	26	4	5	4	14	12	+2	2	3	8	9	26	−17

Last updated: 25 February 2018.
Source: Results

===== Results by results =====
Matchday	1	2	3	4	5	6	7	8	9	10	11	12	13	14	15	16	17	18	19	20	21	22	23	24	25	26
Ground	A	H	H	A	H	A	H	A	H	A	H	A	A	H	A	A	H	A	H	H	A	H	A	H	A	H
Result	L	D	W	D	W	W	W	D	D	L	W	L	L	D	L	L	D	L	L	L	L	L	W	L	D	D
Position	12	14	13	8	9	6	3	3	3	3	7	5	6	6	7	7	8	8	8	8	10	10	9	9	9	9

Updated to match(es) played on 25 February 2018. Source: Results
A = Away; H = Home; W = Win; D = Draw; L = Loss; P = Postponed

===== Results =====
26 August 2017 2	Ethnikos Achna	3–0	Pafos	Achna
19:00 EEST (UTC+3)	Kipiani 5', 62'; Charalambous 37'; Aresti (yellow card) 90+1'	Report	Horić (yellow card) 61'; Zachariou (yellow card) 77'	Stadium: Dasaki Stadium; Referee: Vasilis Demetriou

10 September 2017 3	Pafos	1–1	Alki Oroklini	Paphos
18:00 EEST (UTC+3)	Janža 3' (yellow card) 56'; Domínguez (yellow card) 47'; Koprivec (yellow card) 81'; Fylaktou (yellow card) 83'	Report	Parpas (yellow card) 17'; Duventru 45+1'	Stadium: Stelios Kyriakides; Referee: Neofytos Neofytou

16 September 2017 4	Pafos	2–1	AC Omonia	Paphos
19:00 EEST (UTC+3)	Horić (yellow card) 6'; Camará 60'; Brüls (yellow card) 67'; Janža (yellow card) 72' (goal) 77'; Kovalenko (yellow card) 84'	Report	Demetriou (yellow card) 40'; Soares (yellow card) 56'; Derbyshire 71'; Soares (yellow card) 81'	Stadium: Stelios Kyriakides; Referee: Kostas Psevdiotis

24 September 2017 5	Olympiakos Nicosia	0–0	Pafos	Paphos
18:00 EEST (UTC+3)	Pachipis (yellow card) 38'	Report	Domínguez (yellow card) 90+2'	Stadium: Stelios Kyriakides; Referee: Nikolas Neokleous

30 September 2017 6	Pafos	2–1	Ermis Aradippou	Paphos
18:00 EEST (UTC+3)	Domínguez 47'; Goulon 73'; Horić (yellow card) 84'	Report	Georgiadis 11'; Imerekov (yellow card) 55'; Frimpong (yellow card) 75'; Martynyuk (yellow card) 81'	Stadium: Stelios Kyriakides; Referee: Chrysovalantis Theouli

15 October 2017 7	AEL Limassol	0–1	Pafos	Limassol
18:00 EEST (UTC+3)	Silva (yellow card) 89'	Report	Camará (yellow card) 53'; Domínguez (yellow card) 58'; Koprivec (yellow card) 69'; Fylaktou 90'	Stadium: Tsirio Stadium; Referee: Avraam Tsoukkas

21 October 2017 8	Pafos	4–0	Nea Salamis Famagusta	Paphos
19:00 EEST (UTC+3)	Brüls 29' (yellow card) 55'; Fylaktou (yellow card) 55' (goal) 57'; Roguljić 72'; Deul 83'	Report	Mintikkis (yellow card) 7'	Stadium: Stelios Kyriakides; Referee: Loukas Soteriou

25 October 2017 9	Anorthosis Famagusta	0–0	Pafos	Paphos
18:00 EEST (UTC+3)	Camara (yellow card) 73'; Cissé (yellow card) 81'	Report	Mostefa (yellow card) 63'; Domínguez (yellow card) 66'; Gabovs (yellow card) 70'	Stadium: Stelios Kyriakides; Referee: Kostas Psevdiotis

29 October 2017 10	Pafos	0–0	Aris Limassol	Paphos
18:00 EET (UTC+2)	Kovalenko (yellow card) 83'	Report	Christoforou (yellow card) 19'; A.Mammides (red card) 88'	Stadium: Stelios Kyriakides; Referee: Leontios Trattos

5 November 2017 11	APOEL	4–0	Pafos	Nicosia
16:00 EET (UTC+2)	Poté 37', 55'; Makris 87', 90'	Report	Janža (yellow card) 8'	Stadium: GSP Stadium; Referee: Vasilis Demetriou

20 November 2017 12	Pafos	1–0	Doxa Katokopias	Paphos
19:00 EET (UTC+2)	Deul 84'	Report	Eninful (yellow card) 42'; Neuton (yellow card) 52'; Redondo (yellow card) 90+2'	Stadium: Stelios Kyriakides; Referee: Christos Nikolaides

26 November 2017 13	AEK Larnaca	2–0	Pafos	Larnaca
16:00 EET (UTC+2)	Taulemesse 59'; Larena 71'	Report	Biel (yellow card) 11'; Fylaktou (yellow card) 28'; Goulon (yellow card) 82'	Stadium: AEK Arena; Referee: Nikolas Neokleous

2 December 2017 14	Apollon Limassol	6–0	Pafos	Limassol
17:00 EEST (UTC+3)	Alex (yellow card) 2' (goal) 36'; Papoulis 16'; Alef 51'; Zelaya 59', 81'; Jakoliš 79'	Report	Roguljić (yellow card) 5'; Domínguez (yellow card) 45'; Biel (yellow card) 87'	Stadium: Tsirio Stadium; Referee: Giorgos Nikolaou

9 December 2017 15	Pafos	0–0	Ethnikos Achna	Paphos
18:00 EET (UTC+2)	Biel (yellow card) 51'; Kovalenko (yellow card) 52'	Report	Bogatinov (yellow card) 45+1'; Kyprianou (yellow card) 81'	Stadium: Stelios Kyriakides; Referee: Christos Nikolaides

18 December 2017 16	Alki Oroklini	2–1	Pafos	Larnaca
19:00 EET (UTC+2)	Fabrício 39', 72'; Ngomo (yellow card) 64'; C.Charalambous (yellow card) 90'	Report	Sikorski 23'; Horić (yellow card) 45'; Domínguez (yellow card) 51'	Stadium: Ammochostos Stadium; Referee: Chrysovalantis Theouli

21 December 2017 17	AC Omonia	3–0	Pafos	Nicosia
19:00 EET (UTC+2)	Derbyshire 19' (pen.), 32'; Christofi 51'	Report	Mostefa (yellow card) 33'	Stadium: GSP Stadium; Referee: Yiannis Anastasiou

10 January 2018 1	Pafos	0–2	Apollon Limassol	Paphos
19:00 EET (UTC+2)	Janža (yellow card) 64'	Report	Sardinero 18'; Maglica 60'	Stadium: Stelios Kyriakides; Referee: Kostas Psevdiotis

3 January 2018 18	Pafos	1–1	Olympiakos Nicosia	Paphos
18:00 EET (UTC+2)	Goulon (yellow card) 1' (goal) 72'	Report	C.Sotiriou (yellow card) 45'; G.Serafeim (yellow card) 57'; Miguelito (yellow card) 86'; A.Pouyioukkas 87' (yellow card) 88'	Stadium: Stelios Kyriakides; Referee: Leontios Trattos

6 January 2018 19	Ermis Aradippou	2–0	Pafos	Larnaca
17:00 EET (UTC+2)	Martynyuk (yellow card) 11'; Tsoumou 36'; China (yellow card) 40'; Taralidis (yellow card) 61'; Arabatzis (yellow card) 64'; Emeghara 76'	Report	Janža (yellow card) 14'; Horić (yellow card) 76'; Brüls (yellow card) 87'	Stadium: Antonis Papadopoulos Stadium; Referee: Giorgos Nikolaou

14 January 2018 20	Pafos	0–1	AEL Limassol	Paphos
18:00 EET (UTC+2)	Torbinski (yellow card) 4' (yellow-red card) 50'; Mostefa (yellow card) 27'; Janža (yellow card) 82'; Fylaktou (yellow card) 90'	Report	Wheeler (yellow card) 50'; Arruabarrena (yellow card) 54'; Lafrance (red card) 82'; Goulon 90' (o.g.); Silva (yellow card) 90+6'	Stadium: Stelios Kyriakides; Referee: Neofytos Neofytou

21 January 2018 21	Nea Salamis Famagusta	3–0	Pafos	Larnaca
15:00 EET (UTC+2)	Kousoulos (yellow card) 11'; Carlão 21'; Correia 72'; Santos 88'	Report	Sikorski (yellow card) 35'; Fylaktou (yellow card) 67'	Stadium: Ammochostos Stadium; Referee: Nikolas Neokleous

31 January 2018 22	Pafos	0–1	Anorthosis Famagusta	Paphos
18:00 EET (UTC+2)	Janža (yellow card) 38'; Domínguez (yellow card) 67'; Biel (yellow card) 90+1'	Report	Carlitos (yellow card) 17' (goal) 42'; Economides (yellow card) 45+1'; Ďuriš (yellow card) 90'	Stadium: Stelios Kyriakides; Referee: Loukas Soteriou

6 February 2018 23	Aris Limassol	0–6	Pafos	Limassol
17:00 EET (UTC+2)	Kousas (yellow card) 18'	Report	Sikorski 18', 34', 42'; Deul 81', 84', 90+1'	Stadium: Tsirio Stadium; Referee: Vasilis Demetriou

11 February 2018 24	Pafos	2–3	APOEL	Paphos
15:00 EET (UTC+2)	Bérigaud 64', 79' (yellow card) 74'; Fylaktou (yellow card) 73'	Report	Zahid 32'; Dellatorre 48'; Ebecilio (yellow card) 65'; Souza 90+3'; Oar (yellow card) 90+4'	Stadium: Stelios Kyriakides; Referee: Christos Nikolaides

18 February 2018 25	Doxa Katokopias	1–1	Pafos	Nicosia
17:00 EET (UTC+2)	Eninful 49'; L.Bá (yellow card) 80'	Report	Bérigaud 24'; Taravel (yellow card) 41'; Mostefa (yellow card) 77'; Poyet (yellow card) 90+5'	Stadium: Makario Stadium; Referee: Leontios Trattos

25 February 2018 26	Pafos	1–1	AEK Larnaca	Paphos
18:00 EET (UTC+2)	Taravel (yellow card) 11'; Bérigaud 73'	Report	Laban (yellow card) 43'; Joan Tomàs (yellow card) 67'; Tete (yellow card) 90'; Larena 90+4'	Stadium: Stelios Kyriakides; Referee: Kostas Psevdiotis

==== Relegation round ====
===== League table =====
Pos	Team	Pld	W	D	L	GF	GA	GD	Pts	Relegation
7	Nea Salamis Famagusta	36	14	6	16	53	55	−2	48	
8	Ermis Aradippou	36	14	4	18	50	64	−14	46 (Note: Head to head record: Doxa 2–1 Ermis, Ermis 1–2 Doxa, Doxa 2–3 Ermis, Ermis 2–1 Doxa.)	
9	Doxa Katokopias	36	14	4	18	54	63	−9	46	
10	Pafos FC	36	11	9	16	36	51	−15	42	
11	Alki Oroklini	36	11	6	19	48	73	−25	39	
12	Olympiakos Nicosia (R)	36	5	9	22	34	81	−47	24	Relegation to the Cypriot Second Division

Source: CFA
Rules for classification: 1) Points; 2) Head-to-head points; 3) Head-to-head goal difference; 4) Head-to-head goals scored; 5) Head-to-head away goals scored (only if two teams); 6) Goal difference; 7) Goals scored; 8) Play-off (only if deciding champion or UEFA competitions).
(R) Relegated

===== Results summary =====
Overall								Home						Away					
Pld	W	D	L	GF	GA	GD	Pts	W	D	L	GF	GA	GD	W	D	L	GF	GA	GD
10	5	1	4	13	13	0	16	2	1	2	6	6	0	3	0	2	7	7	0

Last updated: 13 May 2018.
Source: Results

===== Results by results =====
Matchday	1	2	3	4	5	6	7	8	9	10
Ground	A	H	A	A	H	H	A	H	H	A
Result	W	L	L	L	W	L	W	D	W	W
Position	9	10	11	11	11	11	11	11	11	10

Updated to match(es) played on 13 May 2018. Source: Results
A = Away; H = Home; W = Win; D = Draw; L = Loss; P = Postponed

===== Results =====
4 March 2018 27	Nea Salamis Famagusta	1–3	Pafos	Larnaca
18:00 EET (UTC+2)	Carlão 20'; Eloundou (yellow card) 40'; Papadopoulos (yellow card) 45'	Report	Sikorski 45+2', 48'; Taravel (yellow card) 51'; Brüls 65'; Goulon (yellow card) 74'; Koprivec (yellow card) 80'	Stadium: Ammochostos Stadium; Referee: Avraam Tsoukkas

12 March 2018 28	Pafos	0–1	Ermis Aradippou	Paphos
19:00 EET (UTC+2)	Fylaktou (yellow card) 22'; Koprivec (yellow card) 55'	Report	Monteiro (yellow card) 30'; Artabe 57'; Bouwman (yellow card) 61'	Stadium: Stelios Kyriakides; Referee: Christos Nikolaides

17 March 2018 29	Alki Oroklini	3–0	Pafos	Larnaca
18:00 EET (UTC+2)	Diakité 43'; Glombard (yellow card) 45'; Hamdi 48'; Malfleury 61'; Loizides (yellow card) 75'	Report	Fylaktou (yellow card) 19'; Taravel (yellow card) 29'	Stadium: Ammochostos Stadium; Referee: Timotheos Christofi

1 April 2018 30	Olympiakos Nicosia	3–0	Pafos	Nicosia
17:00 EEST (UTC+3)	Polizzi 25'; Christofides (yellow card) 54'; Tribeau 77'; Castro 90'	Report	Poyet (yellow card) 35'; Domínguez (yellow card) 39'; Bérigaud (yellow card) 43'	Stadium: Makario Stadium; Referee: Loukas Soteriou

4 April 2018 31	Pafos	1–0	Doxa Katokopias	Paphos
17:00 EEST (UTC+3)	Brüls (yellow card) 30'; Roguljić 34' (yellow card) 50'	Report	Adoni (yellow card) 85'	Stadium: Stelios Kyriakides; Referee: Vasilis Demetriou

15 April 2018 32	Pafos	1–2	Nea Salamis Famagusta	Paphos
18:00 EEST (UTC+3)	Bérigaud 10'	Report	Kosti 45+1'; Carlão 89'	Stadium: Stelios Kyriakides; Referee: Chrysovalantis Theouli

21 April 2018 33	Ermis Aradippou	0–1	Pafos	Larnaca
19:00 EEST (UTC+3)	Imerekov (yellow card) 49'; Konstantinou (yellow card) 74'; Martynyuk (yellow card) 75'	Report	Gabovs (yellow card) 6'; Sikorski 52'; Christodoulou (yellow card) 58'; Taravel (yellow card) 74'; Janža (yellow card) 90+5'	Stadium: Antonis Papadopoulos Stadium; Referee: Kyriakos Christodoulou

30 April 2018 34	Pafos	1–1	Alki Oroklini	Paphos
19:00 EEST (UTC+3)	Janža (yellow card) 64'; Biel (yellow card) 74'; Dovbnya 88'	Report	Diakité (yellow card) 38'; Fabrício 72' (pen.); Duventru (yellow card) 82'; Tigroudja (yellow card) 90+3'	Stadium: Stelios Kyriakides; Referee: Timotheos Christofi

5 May 2018 35	Pafos	3–2	Olympiakos Nicosia	Paphos
17:00 EEST (UTC+3)	Valdo 21', 76' (yellow card) 80'; Bérigaud 63' (pen.)	Report	A.Pouyioukkas (yellow card) 15'; Polizzi 48'; C.Avlonitis 70'	Stadium: Stelios Kyriakides; Referee: Kyriakos Christodoulou

13 May 2018 36	Doxa Katokopias	0–3	Pafos	Nicosia
17:00 EEST (UTC+3)	Ioannou (yellow card) 43'; S.Charalambous (yellow card) 45+1'; Asamoah (yellow card) 62'	Report	Deul 7'; Dovbnya (yellow card) 16'; Bérigaud 45' (pen.); Valdo 73'	Stadium: Makario Stadium; Referee: Yiannis Anastasiou

=== Cypriot Cup ===
13 December 2017 First Round	Digenis Oroklinis	0–3	Pafos	Larnaca
15:00 EET (UTC+2)			Sikorski 1', 39', 64'	Stadium: AEK Arena; Referee: Kyriacos Christodoulou

17 January 2018 Second Round 1st leg	Enosis Neon Paralimni	3−2	Pafos	Paralimni
17:00 EET (UTC+2)	Kolokoudias 26', 40'; Pierettis 63'; Solari (yellow card) 65'	Report	Fylaktou (yellow card) 63'; Brüls 78'; Papageorgiou 90+1' (o.g.)	Stadium: Paralimni Stadium; Attendance: 500; Referee: Giorgos Nikolaou

21 February 2018 Second Round 2nd leg	Pafos	2–0 (4–3 agg.)	Enosis Neon Paralimni	Paphos
17:00 EET (UTC+2)	Sikorski 15' (yellow card) 78'; Roguljić 28'; Fylaktou (yellow card) 38' (red card) 45'; Janža (yellow card) 70'	Report		Stadium: Stelios Kyriakides; Attendance: 500; Referee: Nikolas Neokleous

28 February 2022 Quarterfinal 1st leg	Doxa Katokopias	2–2	Pafos	Nicosia
19:00 EET (UTC+2)	Redondo (yellow card) 42'; Papafotis 45+1'; Asamoah (yellow card) 71' (goal) 75'; Eninful (yellow card) 83'	Report	Bérigaud 54'; Poyet (yellow card) 70'; Yiangoudakis 90+4'	Stadium: Makario Stadium; Attendance: 200; Referee: Giorgos Nikolaou

7 March 2018 Quarterfinal 2nd leg	Pafos	2–1 (4–3 agg.)	Doxa Katokopias	Paphos
19:00 EET (UTC+2)	Janža 74'; Fylaktou 79'	Report	Sadik 37'; Redondo (yellow card) 74'	Stadium: Stelios Kyriakides; Attendance: 2,000; Referee: Leontios Trattou

18 April 2018 Semifinal 1st leg	Apollon Limassol	4–0	Pafos	Limassol
18:00 EEST (UTC+3)	Zelaya (yellow card) 21'; Martínez (yellow card) 25'; Schembri 35', 45+1'; Sardinero 80'; Marković 90+2'	Report	Poyet (yellow card) 11'; Mostefa (yellow card) 21'; Gabovs (yellow card) 66'	Stadium: Tsirio Stadium; Attendance: 2,315; Referee: Kostas Psevdiotis

25 April 2018 Semifinal 2nd leg	Pafos	1–4 (1–8 agg.)	Apollon Limassol	Paphos
18:00 EEST (UTC+3)	Horić (yellow card) 67'; Deul 74'	Report	Zelaya 11', 34'; Alex da Silva 27' (pen.) (yellow card) 76'; Dovbnya 49' (o.g.); Stylianou (yellow card) 80'	Stadium: Stelios Kyriakides; Referee: Nikolas Neokleous

== Squad statistics ==
As of match played 13 May 2018

=== Appearances and goals ===
No.	Pos	Nat	Player	Total		Cyta Championship		Cypriot Cup	
No.	Pos	Nat	Player	Apps	Goals	Apps	Goals	Apps	Goals
2	DF	(Spain) ESP	Biel Company	24	0	21+3	0	0	0
3	DF	(Cyprus) CYP	Savvas Pikramenos	1	0	0+1	0	0	0
4	DF	(Chile) CHI	Lucas Domínguez	21	1	21	1	0	0
5	MF	(Cyprus) CYP	Georgios Christodoulou	11	0	4+7	0	0	0
6	DF	(Bosnia and Herzegovina) BIH	Kenan Horić	22	0	20+2	0	0	0
7	MF	(Uruguay) URU	Diego Poyet	22	0	13+9	0	0	0
9	FW	(Austria) AUT	Daniel Sikorski	28	7	18+10	7	0	0
10	FW	(Belgium) BEL	Christian Brüls	29	2	27+2	2	0	0
11	FW	(Cyprus) CYP	Panagiotis Zachariou	11	0	6+5	0	0	0
12	MF	(Netherlands) NED	Boy Deul	32	6	22+10	6	0	0
13	DF	(Latvia) LVA	Vladislavs Gabovs	25	0	24+1	0	0	0
20	MF	(Cyprus) CYP	Andreas Stavrou	16	0	6+10	0	0	0
21	MF	(Cyprus) CYP	Rafael Yiangoudakis	4	0	2+2	0	0	0
23	MF	(Cyprus) CYP	Gerasimos Fylaktou	28	2	27+1	2	0	0
27	MF	(Croatia) CRO	Ante Roguljić	22	2	15+7	2	0	0
28	DF	(France) FRA	Nicolas Taravel	11	0	11	0	0	0
31	FW	(Brazil) BRA	Valdo	3	3	3	3	0	0
33	MF	(Belgium) BEL	Jeff Callebaut	1	0	0+1	0	0	0
56	FW	(Cyprus) CYP	Charalambos Demosthenous	7	0	0+7	0	0	0
64	DF	(Slovenia) SVN	Erik Janža	33	2	33	2	0	0
74	FW	(France) FRA	Kévin Bérigaud	16	7	15+1	7	0	0
78	GK	(France) FRA	Léonard Aggoune	4	0	4	0	0	0
82	MF	(Algeria) ALG	Mehdi Mostefa	26	0	26	0	0	0
88	GK	(Slovenia) SVN	Jan Koprivec	32	0	32	0	0	0
93	DF	(France) FRA	Hérold Goulon	26	2	25+1	2	0	0
96	DF	(Russia) RUS	Aleksandr Dovbnya	7	1	4+3	1	0	0
Players away on loan:
Players who appeared for Pafos but left during the season:
8	FW	(Slovenia) SVN	Mitja Lotrič	4	0	1+3	0	0	0
30	FW	(Guinea-Bissau) GNB	Abel Camará	13	1	9+4	1	0	0
34	DF	(Latvia) LVA	Antonijs Černomordijs	1	0	1	0	0	0
80	MF	(Russia) RUS	Dmitri Torbinski	3	0	1+2	0	0	0
97	MF	(Ukraine) UKR	Bohdan Kovalenko	11	0	5+6	0	0	0

=== Goal scorers ===
Place	Position	Nation	Number	Name	Cyta Championship	Cypriot Cup	Total
1	FW	(Austria)	9	Daniel Sikorski	7	4	11
2	FW	(France)	74	Kévin Bérigaud	7	1	8
3	MF	(Netherlands)	12	Boy Deul	6	1	7
4	FW	(Brazil)	31	Valdo	3	0	3
4	DF	(Slovenia)	64	Erik Janža	2	1	3
4	FW	(Belgium)	10	Christian Brüls	2	1	3
4	MF	(Cyprus)	23	Gerasimos Fylaktou	2	1	3
4	MF	(Croatia)	27	Ante Roguljić	2	1	3
9	DF	(France)	93	Hérold Goulon	2	0	2
10	DF	(Chile)	4	Lucas Domínguez	1	0	1
10	DF	(Russia)	96	Aleksandr Dovbnya	1	0	1
10	FW	(Guinea-Bissau)	30	Abel Camará	1	0	1
10	MF	(Cyprus)	21	Rafael Yiangoudakis	0	1	1
10				Own goal	0	1	1
Total					36	12	48

=== Clean sheets ===
Place	Position	Nation	Number	Name	Cyta Championship	Cypriot Cup	Total
1	GK	(Slovenia)	88	Jan Koprivec	9	0	9
2	GK	(France)	78	Léonard Aggoune	2	0	2
TOTALS					11	0	11

=== Disciplinary record ===
Number	Nation	Position	Name	Cyta Championship		Cypriot Cup		Total	
Number	Nation	Position	Name	Booked	Sent off (straight red)	Booked	Sent off (straight red)	Booked	Sent off (straight red)
2	(Spain)	DF	Biel Company	5	0	0	0	5	0
4	(Chile)	DF	Lucas Domínguez	8	0	0	0	8	0
5	(Cyprus)	MF	Georgios Christodoulou	1	0	0	0	1	0
6	(Bosnia and Herzegovina)	DF	Kenan Horić	5	0	1	0	6	0
7	(Uruguay)	MF	Diego Poyet	2	0	2	0	4	0
9	(Austria)	FW	Daniel Sikorski	1	0	1	0	2	0
10	(Belgium)	FW	Christian Brüls	4	0	0	0	4	0
11	(Cyprus)	MF	Panagiotis Zachariou	1	0	0	0	1	0
13	(Latvia)	DF	Vladislavs Gabovs	2	0	1	0	3	0
23	(Cyprus)	MF	Gerasimos Fylaktou	8	0	2	1	10	1
27	(Croatia)	MF	Ante Roguljić	2	0	0	0	2	0
28	(France)	DF	Nicolas Taravel	5	0	0	0	5	0
31	(Brazil)	FW	Valdo	1	0	0	0	1	0
64	(Slovenia)	DF	Erik Janža	9	0	1	0	10	0
74	(France)	FW	Kévin Bérigaud	2	0	0	0	2	0
82	(Algeria)	MF	Mehdi Mostefa	4	0	1	0	5	0
88	(Slovenia)	GK	Jan Koprivec	4	0	0	0	4	0
93	(France)	DF	Hérold Goulon	3	0	0	0	3	0
96	(Russia)	DF	Aleksandr Dovbnya	1	0	0	0	1	0
Players away on loan:
Players who left Pafos during the season:
30	(Guinea-Bissau)	FW	Abel Camará	1	0	0	0	1	0
80	(Russia)	MF	Dmitri Torbinski	2	1	0	0	2	1
97	(Ukraine)	FW	Bohdan Kovalenko	3	0	0	0	3	0
Total				74	1	9	1	83	2
