= 2017–18 Cypriot Cup =

Cyprus Coca-Cola Cup 2017-18

Tournament details
- Country: Cyprus
- Dates: 29 November 2017 – 16 May 2018
- Teams: 22

Final positions
- Champions: AEK Larnaca (2nd title)
- Runners-up: Apollon

Tournament statistics
- Matches played: 35
- Goals scored: 114 (3.26 per match)
- Top goal scorer(s): Onisiforos Roushias; Dellatorre (5 goals)
- All statistics correct as of 16 May 2018.

The 2017–18 Cypriot Cup was the 76th edition of the Cypriot Cup. A total of 22 clubs were accepted to enter the competition. It began on 29 November 2019 with the first round and concluded on 16 May 2018 with the final held at GSP Stadium. The winner of the Cup was AEK Larnaca for second time and qualified for the 2018–19 Europa League second qualifying round.

== First round ==
The first round draw took place on 6 November 2017 and the matches were played on 29 November and 6,13 December 2017.

29 November 2017	Olympiakos Nicosia	3–0	Anagennisi Deryneia	Makario Stadium, Nicosia
15:00 EET	Avlonitis 26'; Castro 49'; Kapartis 86'	Report		Referee: Andreas Konstantinou

29 November 2017	P.O. Xylotymbou	1–2	Anorthosis	Dasaki Stadium, Achna
17:00 EET	Tavrou 38'	Report	Victor 74'; Cissé 76'	Referee: Konstantinos Fotiou

6 December 2017	Ayia Napa	2–1	AEL Limassol	GSZ Stadium, Larnaca
18:00 EET	Soulé 9'; Rowe 80'	Report	Avraam 36'	Referee: Andreas Argirou

13 December 2017	Ethnikos Achna	0–0 (a.e.t.) (6–7 p)	Othellos Athienou	Dasaki Stadium, Achna
15:00 EET		Report		Referee: Chrisovalantis Theouli
	Penalties
	Pincelli (penalty scored); Filipov (penalty scored); Stoychev (penalty missed); Music (penalty scored); Kyprianou (penalty scored); Cikarski (penalty scored); Charalambous (penalty scored); Elia (penalty missed)		Katsis (penalty scored); Fofana (penalty scored); Markovski (penalty scored); Kyriacou (penalty missed); Reangelo (penalty scored); Emmanouil (penalty scored); Kyriacou (penalty scored); Koumouris (penalty scored)

13 December 2017	Digenis Oroklinis	0–3	Pafos	AEK Arena, Larnaca
15:00 EET		Report	Sikorski 1', 39', 64'	Referee: Kyriacos Christodoulou

13 December 2017	Alki Oroklini	0–0 (a.e.t.) (5–6 p)	Enosis Neon Paralimni	Ammochostos Stadium, Larnaca
18:00 EET	Fabrício 120'	Report	Antoniou 96'	Referee: Neophytos Neophytou
	Penalties
	Fabrício (penalty scored); Bilal (penalty missed); Semedo (penalty missed); Vasilev (penalty scored); Parpas (penalty scored); Loizides (penalty scored); Diakité (penalty scored); Chari (penalty missed)		Solari (penalty scored); Edenilson (penalty missed); Constantinou (penalty scored); Andreou (penalty scored); Giorkatzis (penalty missed); Antoniou (penalty scored); Lisboa (penalty scored); Koumis (penalty scored)

== Second round ==
The second round draw took place on 21 December 2017.

The following ten teams advanced directly to second round and will meet the six winners of the first round ties:

- Apollon Limassol (2016–17 Cypriot Cup winner)
- APOEL (2016–17 Cypriot Cup runners-up)
- Doxa Katokopias (2016–17 Cypriot First Division Fair Play winner)
- Omonia (via draw)
- Aris Limassol (via draw)
- Nea Salamina (via draw)
- AEK Larnaca (via draw)
- Ermis Aradippou (via draw)
- Karmiotissa (via draw)
- PAEEK (via draw)

Team 1	Agg.	Team 2	1st leg	2nd leg
Anorthosis	4–3	Ayia Napa	3–2	1–1
Othellos	1–2	Apollon Limassol	1–0	0–2
AEK Larnaca	6–1	Aris Limassol	4–0	2–1
PAEEK	5–2	Karmiotissa	5–1	0–1
Enosis Neon Paralimni	3–4	Pafos	3–2	0–2
Omonia	3–4	Doxa Katokopias	2–3	1–1
Olympiakos Nicosia	3–3 (a)	Nea Salamina	3–3	0–0
Ermis	1–7	APOEL	0–2	1–5

=== First leg ===
10 January 2018	Anorthosis	3−2	Ayia Napa	Antonis Papadopoulos, Larnaca
17:00 EET	Douglão 45+1'; Schildenfeld 68'; Camara 70'	Report	Fernandes 58'; Rowe 90+3'	Attendance: 1,000; Referee: Andreas Konstantinou

10 January 2018	PAEEK	5−1	Karmiotissa	Makario Stadium, Nicosia
17:00 EET	Oppong 12'; Martsakis 18'; Bodiong 71' (pen.), 77'; Costa 79'	Report	Pieri 19'	Attendance: 100; Referee: Constantinos Photiou

10 January 2018	Ermis	0−2	APOEL	GSZ Stadium, Larnaca
19:00 EET		Report	Ebecilio 28'; Bertoglio 57'	Attendance: 500; Referee: Nikolas Neokleous

17 January 2018	Enosis Neon Paralimni	3−2	Pafos	Paralimni Stadium, Paralimni
17:00 EET	Kolokoudias 26', 40'; Pierettis 63'	Report	Brüls 78'; Papageorgiou 90+1' (o.g.)	Attendance: 500; Referee: Giorgos Nikolaou

24 January 2018	AEK Larnaca	4−0	Aris Limassol	AEK Arena, Larnaca
17:00 EET	Taulemesse 22' (pen.), 53'; Català 28'; Roushias 61'	Report		Attendance: 1,000; Referee: Christos Nikolaides

14 February 2018	Omonia	2−3	Doxa Katokopias	GSP Stadium, Nicosia
17:00 EET	Derbyshire 55', 86' (pen.)	Report	Kifouéti 40'; Luís Carlos 61'; Ba 82'	Attendance: 3,255; Referee: Christos Nikolaides

14 February 2018	Othellos	1−0	Apollon	Antonis Papadopoulos, Larnaca
18:00 EET	Fofana 82'	Report		Attendance: 150; Referee: Neofytos Neofytou

14 February 2018	Olympiakos	3−3	Nea Salamina	Makario Stadium, Nicosia
19:00 EET	Tribeau 50', 52'; Miguelito 90'	Report	Makriev 8'; Poljanec 33'; Carlão 87'	Attendance: 130; Referee: Avraam Tsoukkas

=== Second leg ===
17 January 2018	Ayia Napa	1−1 (3–4 agg.)	Anorthosis	Antonis Papadopoulos, Larnaca
17:00 EET	Rowe 90+2'	Report	Douglão 65' (pen.)	Attendance: 1,000; Referee: Andreas Konstantinou

14 February 2018	Aris Limassol	1−2 (1–6 agg.)	AEK Larnaca	Tsirio Stadium, Limassol
17:00 EET	Maragoudakis 27'	Report	Tričkovski 32'; Roushias 82'	Attendance: 12; Referee: Chrysovalantis Theouli

21 February 2018	Doxa Katokopias	1–1 (4–3 agg.)	Omonia	Makario Stadium, Nicosia
17:00 EET	Sadik 18'	Report	William 69'	Attendance: 4,000; Referee: Kostas Psevdiotis

21 February 2018	Karmiotissa	1–0 (2–5 agg.)	PAEEK	GSZ Stadium, Larnaca
17:00 EET	Pieri 90+1'	Report		Attendance: 100; Referee: Kyriakos Christodoulou

21 February 2018	Pafos	2–0 (4–3 agg.)	Enosis Neon Paralimni	Stelios Kyriakides, Paphos
17:00 EET	Sikorski 15'; Roguljić 28'; Fylaktou (yellow card) 38' (red card) 45'	Report		Attendance: 500; Referee: Nikolas Neokleous

21 February 2018	APOEL	5–1 (7–1 agg.)	Ermis	GSP Stadium, Nicosia
19:00 EET	Aloneftis 7'; Makris 45+1'; Dellatorre 75', 79', 90+2'	Report	Monteiro 15'	Attendance: 1,925; Referee: Loukas Soteriou

28 February 2018	Apollon Limassol	2–0 (2–1 agg.)	Othellos	Tsirio Stadium, Limassol
17:00 EET	Maglica 33'; Zelaya 82'	Report	Katsis (yellow card) 34' (yellow-red card) 73'	Attendance: 200; Referee: Chrysovalantis Theouli

28 February 2018	Nea Salamina	0–0 (3–3 (a) agg.)	Olympiakos Nicosia	Ammochostos Stadium, Larnaca
17:00 EET		Report		Attendance: 500; Referee: Vasilis Demetriou

== Quarter-finals ==
The quarter-finals draw took place on 20 February 2018 and the matches were played on 28 February, 7, 14 March and 11 April 2018.

Team 1	Agg.	Team 2	1st leg	2nd leg
AEK Larnaca	11–1	PAEEK	7–0	4–1
Doxa Katokopias	3–4	Pafos	2–2	1–2
Nea Salamina	2–5	APOEL	0–3	2–2
Anorthosis	2–3	Apollon Limassol	1–1	1–2

=== First leg ===
28 February 2018	AEK Larnaca	7–0	PAEEK	AEK Arena, Larnaca
17:00 EET	Tričkovski 6', 80'; Giannou 9'; Cases 29'; Hevel 45+1'; Larena 60'; Roushias 75'	Report		Attendance: 550; Referee: Giannis Anastasiou

28 February 2018	Doxa Katokopias	2–2	Pafos	Makario Stadium, Nicosia
19:00 EET	Papafotis 45+1'; Asamoah 75'	Report	Bérigaud 54'; Yiangoudakis 90+4'	Attendance: 200; Referee: Giorgos Nikolaou

7 March 2018	Nea Salamina	0–3	APOEL	Ammochostos Stadium, Larnaca
17:15 EET		Report	Dellatorre 8'; de Camargo 23', 53'	Attendance: 1,000; Referee: Nikolas Neokleous

14 March 2018	Anorthosis	1–1	Apollon Limassol	Antonis Papadopoulos, Larnaca
15:00 EET	Pranjić 56' (pen.)	Report	Jander 20'	Attendance: 3,000; Referee: Giorgos Nikolaou

=== Second leg ===
7 March 2018	PAEEK	1–4 (1–11 agg.)	AEK Larnaca	Makario Stadium, Nicosia
17:00 EET	Costa 82'	Report	Roushias 28', 62'; Giannou 59'; Tričkovski 66'	Attendance: 200; Referee: Kyriakos Christodoulou

7 March 2018	Pafos	2–1 (4–3 agg.)	Doxa Katokopias	Stelios Kyriakides, Paphos
19:00 EET	Janža 74'; Fylaktou 79'	Report	Sadik 37'	Attendance: 2,000; Referee: Leontios Trattou

14 March 2018	APOEL	2–2 (5–2 agg.)	Nea Salamina	GSP Stadium, Nicosia
17:00 EET	de Camargo 10'; Dellatorre 88'	Report	Makriev 57': Kyprianou 82'	Attendance: 1,641; Referee: Kostas Psevdiotis

11 April 2018	Apollon Limassol	2–1 (3–2 agg.)	Anorthosis	Tsirio Stadium, Limassol
19:00 EEST	Papoulis 11'; Jakoliš 70'	Report	Koffi 89'	Attendance: 4,261; Referee: Leontios Trattou

== Semi-finals ==
The semi-finals draw took place on 12 April 2018 and the matches were played on 18 and 25 April 2018.

Team 1	Agg.	Team 2	1st leg	2nd leg
Apollon Limassol	8–1	Pafos	4–0	4–1
AEK Larnaca	4–1	APOEL	2–0	2–1

=== First leg ===
18 April 2018	Apollon Limassol	4–0	Pafos	Tsirio Stadium, Limassol
18:00 EEST	Schembri 35', 45+1'; Sardinero 80'; Marković 90+2'	Report		Attendance: 2,315; Referee: Kostas Psevdiotis

18 April 2018	AEK Larnaca	2–0	APOEL	AEK Arena, Larnaca
19:00 EEST	Hevel 15'; Giannou 83'	Report	Ioannou (yellow card) 35' (yellow-red card) 63'	Attendance: 4,500; Referee: Leontios Trattou

=== Second leg ===
25 April 2018	Pafos	1–4 (1–8 agg.)	Apollon Limassol	Stelios Kyriakides, Paphos
18:00 EEST	Deul 74'	Report	Zelaya 11', 34'; Alex da Silva 27' (pen.); Dovbnya 49' (o.g.)	Referee: Nikolas Neokleous

25 April 2018	APOEL	1–2 (1–4 agg.)	AEK Larnaca	GSP Stadium, Nicosia
18:00 EEST	de Camargo 31'	Report	Taulemesse 57'; Català 73'	Referee: Demetris Masias

== Final ==
16 May 2018
18:30 EEST

AEK Larnaca	2–1	Apollon Limassol
Taulemesse 69'; Acorán 71'	Report	Schembri 45'

GSP Stadium, Nicosia
Attendance: 11,800
Referee: Loukas Soteriou

Cypriot Cup 2017–18 Winners
AEK Larnaca
2nd Title

== See also ==
- 2017–18 Cypriot First Division
- 2017–18 Cypriot Second Division
