= Anzalone =

Anzalone is a surname of Italian origin, primarily associated with Sicily and Naples. It is believed to be a variant of Ansalone, which itself may be derived from the Biblical name Absalom (Hebrew origin, “father of peace”) or Ansaldo (Germanic: ans = god, wald = rule/power)

Historically, the Anzalone name traces back to Bologna, a major intellectual center in medieval Italy. It later became more prevalent in Sicily and southern Italy, particularly in Campania.

Variations of the surname include Ansaldi, Ansaldo, Anzaldi, Anzaldo, and Ansaloni, reflecting regional dialects and linguistic influences, especially between northern and southern Italy.

Today, Anzalone remains common in Italy, especially in Sicily (Caltanissetta, Palermo, and Catania) and Campania, as well as among Italian diaspora communities, particularly in the United States

Notable people with the name include.

- Alex Anzalone (born 1994), American football linebacker
- Andrea Anzalone (died 1656), Italian composer and instrumentalist
- Edwin M. Anzalone, better known as Fireman Ed (born 1959), American superfan of the New York Jets
- Eric Anzalone (born 1965), American singer
- Fabrizio Anzalone (born 1978), Italian footballer
- Francesco Anzalone (1607–1656), Italian violinist and string teacher
- Frank Anzalone (born 1954), American ice hockey coach
- Giacinto Anzalone (1606–1656), Italian composer, conductor, and director of the Naples Conservatory

== See also ==
- Anzalone family of musicians
