= Antonio Rizzo =

Antonio Rizzo may refer to:

- Antonio Rizzo (footballer) (born 1981), Italian former footballer
- Antonio Rizzo (architect) (1430–1499), Italian architect and sculptor

== See also ==
- Anthony Rizzo (disambiguation)
