= Tete (footballer) =

Spanish footballer

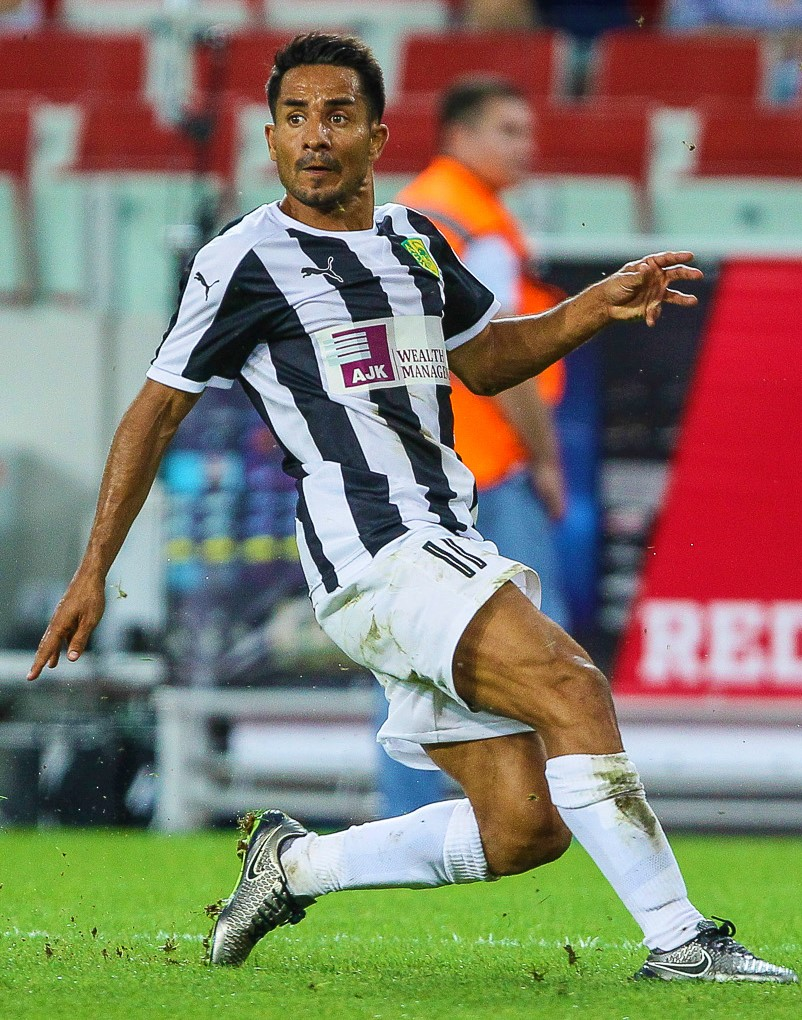

Personal information
- Full name: Alberto Sansimena Chamorro
- Date of birth: 26 May 1985 (age 41)
- Place of birth: Badajoz, Spain
- Height: 1.65 m (5 ft 5 in)
- Position: Winger

Youth career
- Flecha Negra
- 2000–2003: Atlético Madrid

Senior career*
Years	Team	Apps	(Gls)
2003–2004	Cacereño	16	(0)
2004–2005	Cerro Reyes		
2005–2006	Ciudad Lorca		
2006–2007	Villanovense	32	(2)
2007–2008	Xerez B	25	(3)
2008–2009	Manchego	28	(7)
2009–2011	Badajoz	59	(9)
2011–2013	Albacete	63	(6)
2013–2015	Murcia	29	(1)
2014–2015	→ Ponferradina (loan)	23	(0)
2015–2020	AEK Larnaca	124	(8)
2020–2021	Don Benito	6	(1)
- * Club domestic league appearances and goals

Alberto Sansimena Chamorro (born 26 May 1985), known as Tete, is a Spanish retired footballer who played as a winger.

== Club career ==
Born in Badajoz, Extremadura, Tete made his senior debut with CP Cacereño in the 2003–04 season in the Segunda División B, suffering team relegation. He only returned to the third division in the 2006–07 campaign, signing with CF Villanovense.

Tete alternated between the third tier and Tercera División in the following years, playing for Xerez CD B, CD Manchego, CD Badajoz and Albacete Balompié. On 15 July 2013, he joined Segunda División club Real Murcia.

On 18 August 2013, aged 28, Tete played his first professional match, starting in a 2–3 home loss against Recreativo de Huelva. He scored his first goal in the competition on 8 December, the first in a 1–1 away draw with CD Mirandés.

On 26 August 2014, after the Murcians' relegation, Tete signed with fellow league team SD Ponferradina in a season-long loan deal. He moved abroad on 1 July of the following year, joining AEK Larnaca FC of the Cypriot First Division.

== Club statistics ==
As of match played on 24 May 2019

Club	Season	League			Cup		Continental		Total	
Club	Season	Division	Apps	Goals	Apps	Goals	Apps	Goals	Apps	Goals
Cacereño	2003–04	Segunda División B	16	0	—		—		16	0
Villanovense	2006–07	Segunda División B	32	2	1	0	—		33	2
Xerez	2007–08	Segunda División	0	0	0	0	—		0	0
Badajoz	2010–11	Segunda División B	28	2	3	0	—		31	2
Albacete	2011–12	Segunda División B	30	5	6	0	3 (Note: Appearances in Promotion Play-offs)	0	39	5
Albacete	2012–13	Segunda División B	33	1	1	0	2	0	36	1
Albacete	Total		63	6	7	0	5	0	75	6
Murcia	2013–14	Segunda División	28	1	1	0	1	0	30	1
Ponferradina (loan)	2014–15	Segunda División	23	0	1	0	—		24	0
AEK Larnaca	2015–16	Cypriot First Division	32	3	3	0	2 (Note: Appearances in UEFA Europa League)	0	37	3
AEK Larnaca	2016–17	Cypriot First Division	23	2	0	0	8	0	31	2
AEK Larnaca	2017–18	Cypriot First Division	31	1	5	0	8	1	44	2
AEK Larnaca	2018–19	Cypriot First Division	21	2	4	0	11	1	36	3
AEK Larnaca	Total		107	8	12	0	29	2	148	10
Career total			297	19	25	0	35	2	357	21

== Honours ==
AEK Larnaca

- Cypriot Cup: 2017–18
