= Maikol Benassi =

Italian footballer (born 1989)

Personal information
- Date of birth: 26 November 1989 (age 36)
- Place of birth: Viareggio, Italy
- Height: 1.82 m (6 ft 0 in)
- Position: Centre-back

Team information
- Current team: ASD Ragusa Calcio 1949
- Number: 2

Youth career
- Lucchese

Senior career*
Years	Team	Apps	(Gls)
2008–2010	Viareggio	39	(0)
2010–2015	Carrarese	100	(2)
2015	San Marino	15	(0)
2015–2017	Parma	9	(0)
2017	Livorno	11	(0)
2017	Fermana	9	(0)
2018	Monopoli	9	(0)
2018–2019	Cesena	30	(2)
2019–2021	Lucchese	45	(3)
2021–2022	Novara	23	(3)
2022	Pistoiese	11	(1)
2022–2023	Livorno	13	(0)
2023–2024	Siracusa	29	(0)
2024–2025	ASD Ragusa Calcio 1949	7	(0)
2025	Puteolana	12	(0)
2025	Gela	5	(0)
2025–	ASD Ragusa Calcio 1949	14	(0)

International career
2009–2010	Italy U20 Lega Pro	5	(0)
- * Club domestic league appearances and goals as of 27 September 2026

Maikol Benassi (born 26 November 1989) is an Italian footballer who plays as a centre-back for Serie D club ASD Ragusa Calcio 1949.

== Club career ==
=== Viareggio ===
Born in Viareggio, the Province of Lucca, Benassi started his career at Lucca team Lucchese. After the team was expelled from professional league, he was signed by Serie B team Empoli, but farmed to Lega Pro Seconda Divisione side Viareggio in a co-ownership deal, rejoining Lucchese team-mate Leonardo Massoni and Luca Ruglioni. In the first season he only played 9 times. He followed the team promoted to Lega Pro Prima Divisione as some teams were expelled from professional league, thus Viareggio was selected to fill the vacancies. He became a regular starter that season, replacing departed Massoni, and also played both legs of relegation play-offs, partnered with Lorenzo Fiale. On 24 June 2010 Viareggio bought the remain 50% registration rights from Empoli.

=== Carrarese ===
After Viareggio re-signed Massoni as well as other defenders on a temporary basis, Benassi was sold to Lega Pro Seconda Divisione side Carrarese in another co-ownership deal. He just missed once for Carrarese, which he was suspended in round 29 for his fourth caution. He also played the first two rounds of the league for Viareggio and once in the cup. He also played all 4 promotion play-offs, partnering Fabrizio Anzalone and scored once in the last match. On 18 June 2011 Carrarese bought the remain 50% registration rights from Viareggio.

=== Romagna Centro Cesena ===
On 4 August 2018, Benassi joined Romagna Centro Cesena in Serie D.

=== Lucchese ===
On 4 September 2019, he returned to his youth club Lucchese, now in Serie D.

=== Pistoiese ===
On 12 July 2022, he moved to Pistoiese on Serie D.

=== Return to Livorno ===
On 14 December 2022, Benassi returned to Livorno.

== International career ==
He has been capped for the Italy U-20 Lega Pro team in the 2008–09 Mirop Cup and in 2009–11 International Challenge Trophy
