= Anthony Rizzo (disambiguation) =

Anthony Rizzo (born 1989) is a Major League Baseball player.

Anthony Rizzo or Tony Rizzo may also refer to:

- Tony Rizzo (born 1940), Ontario politician
- Tony Rizzo on the Radio
- Anthony Rizzo, director of Duck and Cover

== See also ==
- Antonio Rizzo (disambiguation)
