= Léonard Aggoune =

French footballer (born 1997)

Personal information
- Full name: Léonard Antoine Aggoune
- Date of birth: 18 December 1997 (age 28)
- Place of birth: Paris, France
- Height: 1.86 m (6 ft 1 in)
- Position: Goalkeeper

Team information
- Current team: MB Rouissat
- Number: 16

Youth career
- –2015: Paris Saint-Germain

Senior career*
Years	Team	Apps	(Gls)
2015–2017	Paris Saint-Germain B	7	(0)
2017–2018	Pafos	4	(0)
2018–2019	Créteil	1	(0)
2018–2019	Créteil B	13	(0)
2019–2021	Les Ulis	16	(0)
2021–2022	Créteil	0	(0)
2021–2022	Créteil B	12	(0)
2022–2023	Moulins Yzeure	24	(0)
2023–2024	Rouen	0	(0)
2024–2026	MC Oran	22	(0)
2026	Duhok SC	0	(0)
2026–	MB Rouissat	0	(0)
- * Club domestic league appearances and goals as of 6 August 2026

Léonard Antoine Aggoune (Arabic: ليونار أونتوان عقون; born 18 December 1997) is a French-Algerian professional footballer who plays as a goalkeeper for MB Rouissat.

== Career ==
Developed in Paris Saint-Germain Youth Academy, Aggoune was part of club's reserve side during 2015–16 and 2016–17 seasons. His playing minutes were however limited as Rémy Descamps was the team's first-choice goalkeeper. Aggoune was also part of club's under-19 team which reached final of 2015–16 UEFA Youth League.

Aggoune signed for Cypriot club Pafos prior to 2017–18 season. He made his professional debut on 21 April 2018 in a 1–0 win against Ermis Aradippou. He signed for Championnat National 2 club Créteil in August 2018. After spending two seasons at Les Ulis, Aggoune returned to Créteil in July 2021.
