= Anzalone family of musicians =

The Anzalone family of musicians, sometime spelled as Ansalone or Anzelonus, were an Italian family of musicians active during the 16th and 17th centuries in Naples. 14 members of the family were active in the city over four generations, primarily as wind instrument performers, but also as composers and music teachers. Many of them were employed at either the Chapel Royal of Naples (CRN) or the Naples Conservatory.

== Partial list of Anzalone family members ==
- Giacinto Anzalone (1606–1656) was both maestro di cappella and director of the Conservatorio della Pietà dei Turchini (CPT) from 1630 until his death in 1656. He was the author of the music text Psalmi de vespere a quattro voci, con un Laudate pueri alla venetiana op.3 (1635, published in Naples by Ottavio Beltrano) and was maestro di cappella at the Sant'Anna dei Lombardi. His composition for keyboard, Canzona francese, survives in the Cemino manuscript held in the library of the Conservatorio di San Pietro a Majella.
- Francesco Anzalone (1607–1656) was a string teacher at the Conservatorio dei Poveri di Gesù Cristo and the Conservatorio della Pietà dei Turchini who was appointed violinist at the CRN in 1640; replacing Aniello Finamore. He held that position until his death during which time he was also in service as to the viceroy of Naples with the title musica da camera. Surviving manuscripts of several of his music compositions, mostly motets, are held in the Biblioteca dei Girolamini.
- Giovanni Giacomo Anzalone was Maestro e Cornetto e Trombone at the CPT from 1626 to 1640.
- Andrea Anzalone (cousin of Giacinto, died 1656, Naples) was a composer and instrumentalist who worked as a musician at the Castel Nuovo. He contributed music to the opera pastiche Delizie di Possillipo boscrecce e marittime which was staged in Naples during Carnival of 1620. Four manuscripts of dance music composed by him are catalogued by Répertoire International des Sources Musicales.
- It is possible, but not certain, that Antonia Anzalone, a native of Rome and the mother of composer Domenico Scarlatti, may have been a distant relation to the Anzalone family of Naples.
