= Josias Basso =

Brazilian footballer

Personal information
- Full name: Josias Basso Lisboa
- Date of birth: 14 April 1989 (age 37)
- Place of birth: Vacaria, Brazil
- Height: 1.86 m (6 ft 1 in)
- Position: Centre-back

Team information
- Current team: Caxias

Youth career
- 2006–2008: Juventude
- 2008: Grêmio São José

Senior career*
Years	Team	Apps	(Gls)
2008–2010	Reggina	1	(0)
2009–2010	→ Ravenna (loan)	4	(0)
2010–2011	Slavia Sofia	5	(0)
2013	Operário	2	(0)
2013	Marcílio Dias	6	(1)
2014	Operário	15	(0)
2015	Lajeadense	8	(0)
2016	Glória	1	(0)
2016	Lajeadense	0	(0)
2017	Enosis Neon Paralimni	6	(0)
2018–	Caxias	2	(0)
- * Club domestic league appearances and goals as of 1 December 2017

Josias Basso Lisboa (born 14 April 1989) is a Brazilian professional footballer who plays as a centre-back for Caxias. Basso also holds Italian nationality by descent.

== Career ==
Born in Vacaria, Rio Grande do Sul, Basso started his career at Juventude. He signed a 3-year youth contract in January 2006. On 1 July 2008, he left for Grêmio Esportivo São José, but on 1 September for Serie A side Reggina. He played for their Primavera youth team for a season, and made his Serie A debut on 31 May 2009, the last match of the season. Basso replaced Vincenzo Camilleri in the 64th minute. In July 2009, he was loaned to Ravenna of Lega Pro Prima Divisione along with Antonio Rizzo and Tommaso Squillace.

One year later, on 23 February 2011, Basso signed for Bulgarian Slavia Sofia on an 18-month contract. He made his debut in the 1–1 draw against Lokomotiv Plovdiv on 2 April.
