= Lucas Domínguez =

Chilean footballer (born 1989)

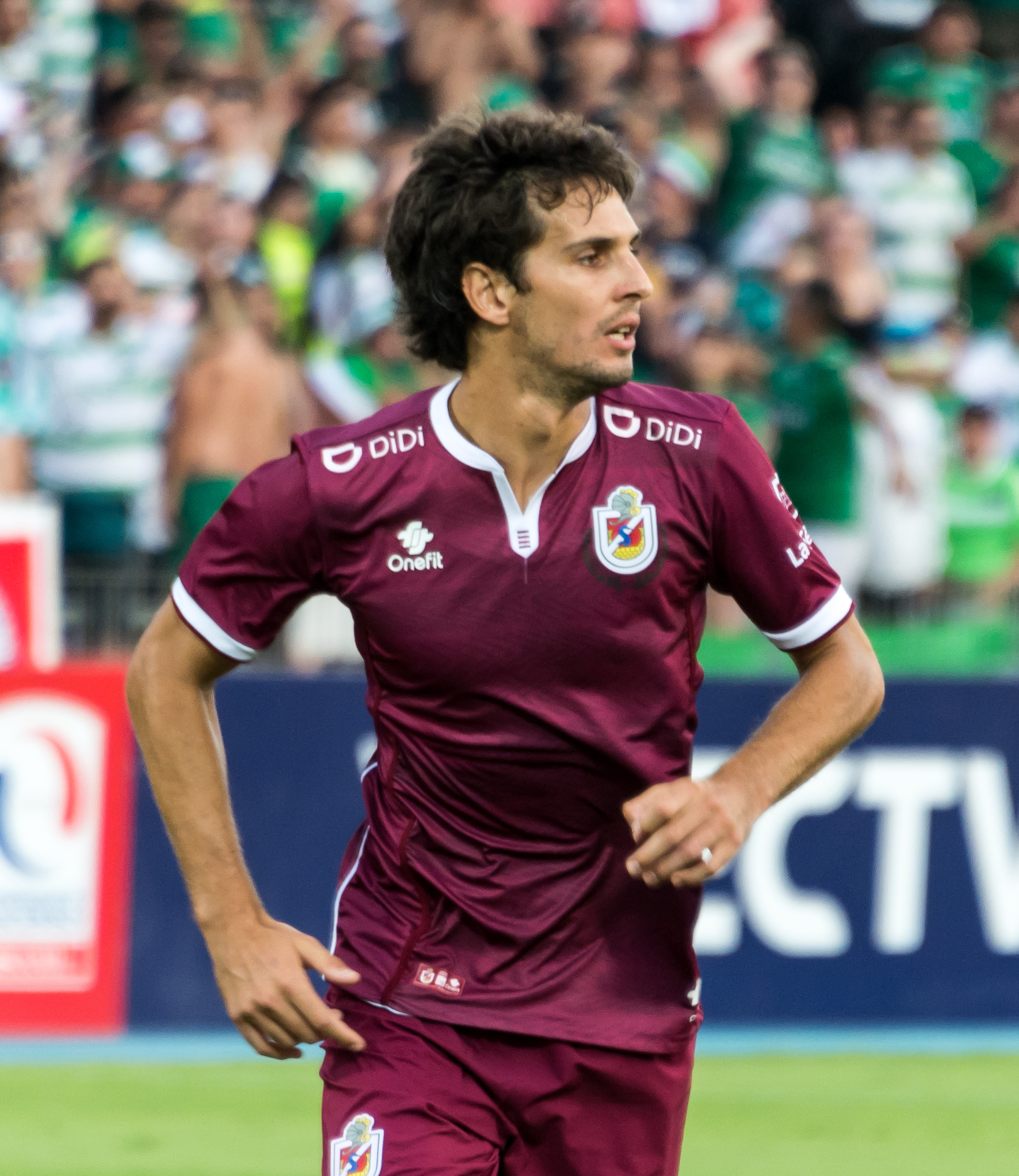

Personal information
- Full name: Lucas Domínguez Irarrázabal
- Date of birth: 27 October 1989 (age 37)
- Place of birth: Santiago, Chile
- Height: 1.87 m (6 ft 1 1/2 in)
- Position: Centre back

Youth career
- Audax Italiano

Senior career*
Years	Team	Apps	(Gls)
2008–2012	Audax Italiano	77	(7)
2012	Audax Italiano B	1	(0)
2013	Colo-Colo B	4	(1)
2013–2014	Colo-Colo	10	(0)
2014	→ Everton (loan)	14	(0)
2014–2015	Ponferradina	18	(1)
2015–2016	Palestino	4	(0)
2016–2017	Unión Española	26	(2)
2017–2018	Pafos	21	(1)
2018–2019	Everton	2	(0)
2019	Rangers	11	(2)
2020	Deportes La Serena	1	(0)

International career
2008	Chile U23	1	(0)
2011–2012	Chile	6	(0)
- * Club domestic league appearances and goals

Lucas Domínguez Irarrázabal (born 27 October 1989) is a retired Chilean former professional footballer who played as a centre back and his last team was Chilean Primera División club Deportes La Serena. Domínguez has been capped by Chile at international level.

== Club career ==
=== Audax Italiano ===
After of many years in Audax Italiano lower divisions, Domínguez was promoted to the first team of the club in June 2008. Domínguez he officially debut for the club in the fourth round of the Copa Chile 2008–09 against Santiago Wanderers, aged 19, in a 2–2 draw on 23 October. In the same match, he scored his first senior goal for Audax in the 51st minute. On 9 March 2009, he made his Chilean Primera Division debut, playing the 90 minutes in a 3–3 draw against Municipal Iquique.

In the next season, Domínguez was a frequently player in Audax's starting lineup, being a key player in the club, devoting in his position. On 18 March 2010, he scored his first competitive goal for Primera Division in a 5–1 victory over Ñublense at Nelson Oyarzún Stadium. Domínguez made an important role as defender in the 3–2 victory of Audax against Universidad Católica, he also scored the momentary draw 1–1 with an impressive header.

== International career ==
In 2008, he represented Chile U23 at the 2008 Inter Continental Cup in Malaysia.

Domínguez made his debut for Chilean senior team on 22 January 2011 against the United States at The Home Depot Center in Carson. He came on as a second-half substitute, replacing Daúd Gazale after 71 minutes.

== Personal life ==
He lives with his family in Pirque and practices playing the piano to relax.
