= Andreas Stavrou =

Cypriot footballer (born 1988)

Personal information
- Full name: Andreas Stavrou
- Date of birth: October 27, 1988 (age 38)
- Place of birth: Limassol, Cyprus
- Height: 1.70 m (5 ft 7 in)
- Position: Midfielder

Team information
- Current team: Karmiotissa

Senior career*
Years	Team	Apps	(Gls)
2006–2014	Apollon Limassol	84	(1)
2008–2009	→ PAEEK FC (loan)	20	(2)
2014–2016	AEL Limassol	45	(4)
2016–2017	Karmiotissa	28	(2)
2017–2018	Pafos	16	(0)
2018–2019	Alki Oroklini	23	(3)
2019–	Karmiotissa	13	(0)

International career
2011–2012	Cyprus	2	(0)
- * Club domestic league appearances and goals as of 21 May 2020

Andreas Stavrou (Greek: Ανδρέας Σταύρου; born October 27, 1988) is a Cypriot footballer, who plays for Karmiotissa FC.

== Career ==
Stavrou joined Karmiotissa FC in August 2019.
