= Antonio Rizzo (footballer) =

Italian footballer (born 1981)

Personal information
- Full name: Antonio Rizzo
- Date of birth: 28 March 1981 (age 45)
- Place of birth: Civitavecchia, Italy
- Height: 1.77 m (5 ft 10 in)
- Position: Right back

Youth career
- AS Roma

Senior career*
Years	Team	Apps	(Gls)
2000–2003	Gubbio	78	(2)
2003–2005	Fiorentina	7	(0)
2004–2005	→ Spezia (loan)	33	(0)
2005–2008	Perugia	54	(2)
2008–2011	Reggina	0	(0)
2008–2009	→ Cremonese (loan)	9	(0)
2009–2010	→ Ravenna (loan)	32	(0)
2011	Cosenza	1	(0)
Total		214	(4)
- * Club domestic league appearances and goals

Antonio Rizzo (born 28 March 1981) is an Italian former footballer who played as a defender. Rizzo holds a certificate in youth coaching.

== Career ==
=== Early career ===
Rizzo started his career at AS Roma. He joined Serie C2 side Gubbio in co-ownership deal. In summer 2003, he joined Serie B side Fiorentina who promoted from Serie C2 in co-ownership for €77,500 from Roma. In June 2004, Roma gave up the remain 50% registration rights to La Viola for free. La Viola loaned him to Serie C1 side Spezia, which he won Coppa Italia Serie C.

=== Perugia ===
In summer 2005, he joined Serie C1 side Perugia in co-ownership deal for a peppercorn of €500, but failed to play regularly in the first season. In June 2006 Perugia acquired all the rights. He signed a contract extension in April 2007 which last until June 2009.

=== Reggina and loans ===
In January 2008, he was signed by Serie A side Reggina but loaned back to Perugia. In summer 2008, he joined Cremonese of Lega Pro Prima Divisione. But in mid-season, he joined league rival Ravenna, swapped with Fabrizio Anzalone. In July 2009, he remained at Ravenna and joined with his Reggina "teammate" Tommaso Squillace and Josias Basso Lisboa on loan.

=== Cosenza and retirement ===
On 13 January 2011 Alessandro Bernardi moved to Reggio Calabria; Rizzo left for Cosenza as part of the deal. On 30 June 2012 he qualified as a youth coach.
