= Biel Company (footballer) =

Spanish footballer

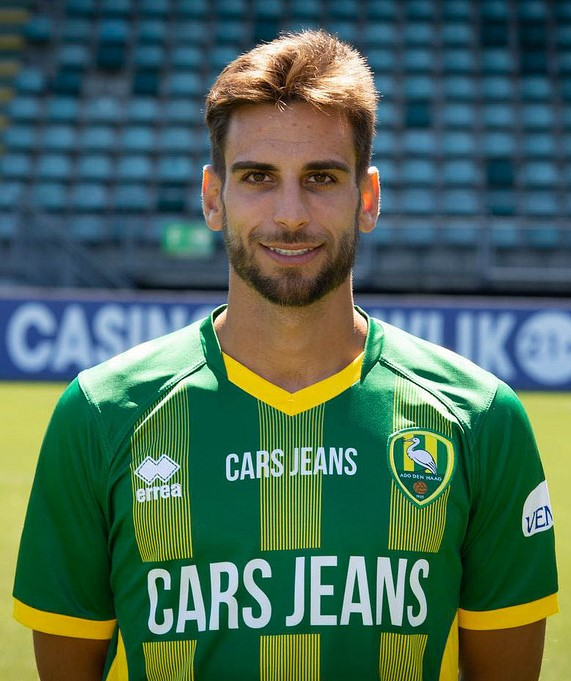
- Company with Den Haag in 2018

Personal information
- Full name: Gabriel Company Vives
- Date of birth: 16 February 1992 (age 34)
- Place of birth: Maria de la Salut, Spain
- Height: 1.76 m (5 ft 9 in)
- Position: Right back

Youth career
- Mallorca

Senior career*
Years	Team	Apps	(Gls)
2011–2015	Mallorca B	76	(3)
2012–2017	Mallorca	59	(0)
2017–2018	Pafos	24	(0)
2018–2020	Hermannstadt	14	(0)
2020–	Manacor	11	(0)
- * Club domestic league appearances and goals as of 31 January 2021

Gabriel "Biel" Company Vives (born 16 February 1992), is a Spanish footballer who plays for CD Manacor as a right back.

== Club career ==
=== Mallorca ===
Born in Maria de la Salut, Majorca, Company studied at the University of the Balearic Islands, then graduated from local RCD Mallorca's youth system, and made his senior debuts with the reserves in the 2010–11 season, in Segunda División B. On 11 January 2012 he made his professional debut, playing the entire second half of a 6–1 home routing over Real Sociedad, for the season's Copa del Rey.

Company made his Segunda División debut on 26 January 2014, replacing Pedro Bigas in a 2–2 draw at Real Murcia. On 17 July he signed a new one-year deal with the Balearic outfit, and appeared in 16 matches during the campaign.

On 6 July 2015 Company extended his contract until 2017, being definitely promoted to the main squad.

=== Later career ===
On 6 September 2017, Company moved abroad and signed for Cypriot club Pafos FC.

Following a trial in the Netherlands with ADO Den Haag, Company joined Romanian club FC Hermannstadt on 12 July 2018. On 19 June 2020, Company was released from the club after having his contract mutually terminated.

Company returned to his native island in September 2020, signing for Tercera División club CD Manacor.

== Career statistics ==
As of match played on 21 April 2018

Club	Season	League			Cup		Other		Total	
Club	Season	Division	Apps	Goals	Apps	Goals	Apps	Goals	Apps	Goals
Mallorca B	2010–11	Segunda División B	2	0	—		—		2	0
Mallorca B	2011–12	Segunda División B	27	1	—		—		27	1
Mallorca B	2012–13	Segunda División B	15	0	—		—		15	0
Mallorca B	2013–14	Tercera División	20	2	—		2 (Note: Appearances in Promotion Play-offs)	1	22	3
Mallorca B	2014–15	Segunda División B	12	0	—		—		12	0
Mallorca B	Total		76	3	—		2	1	78	4
Mallorca	2011–12	La Liga	0	0	1	0	—		1	0
Mallorca	2012–13	La Liga	0	0	0	0	—		0	0
Mallorca	2013–14	Segunda División	2	0	0	0	—		2	0
Mallorca	2014–15	Segunda División	16	0	1	0	—		17	0
Mallorca	2015–16	Segunda División	27	0	1	0	—		28	0
Mallorca	2016–17	Segunda División	14	0	2	0	—		16	0
Mallorca	Total		59	0	5	0	—		64	0
Pafos	2017–18	Cypriot First Division	21	0	4	0	—		25	0
Career total			156	3	9	0	2	1	167	4
