= Georgios Christodoulou (footballer, born 1997) =

Cypriot footballer (born 1997)

Personal information
- Date of birth: 17 August 1997 (age 29)
- Height: 1.82 m (6 ft 0 in)
- Position: Midfielder

Team information
- Current team: Nea Salamina Famagusta FC
- Number: 6

Youth career
- –2015: APOEL

Senior career*
| Years | Team | Apps | (Gls) |
| 2015–2018 | APOEL | 1 | (0) |
| 2016–2017 | → Anagennisi Deryneia (loan) | 20 | (1) |
| 2017–2018 | → Pafos (loan) | 11 | (0) |
| 2018–2019 | Ermis Aradippou | 0 | (0) |
| 2019–2021 | Anagennisi Deryneia | 17 | (2) |
| 2021–2024 | Othellos Athienou | 35 | (8) |
| 2024–25 | Omonia Aradippou | 16 | (0) |
| 2025 - | Nea Salamina Famagusta FC | 26 | (7) |

International career^{‡}
| 2014–2015 | Cyprus U19 | 8 | (3) |
| 2016–2020 | Cyprus U21 | 5 | (1) |
- * Club domestic league appearances and goals as of 3 May 2026 ‡ National team caps and goals as of 5 October 2017

Georgios Christodoulou (Greek: Γεώργιος Χριστοδούλου; born 17 August 1997) is a Cypriot footballer who plays for Nea Salamina Famagusta FC.

== Club career ==
He made his Cypriot First Division debut for APOEL on 19 December 2015 in a game against Pafos.

On 25 July 2019, Christodoulou returned to Anagennisi Deryneia.
