= Ante Roguljić =

Croatian footballer

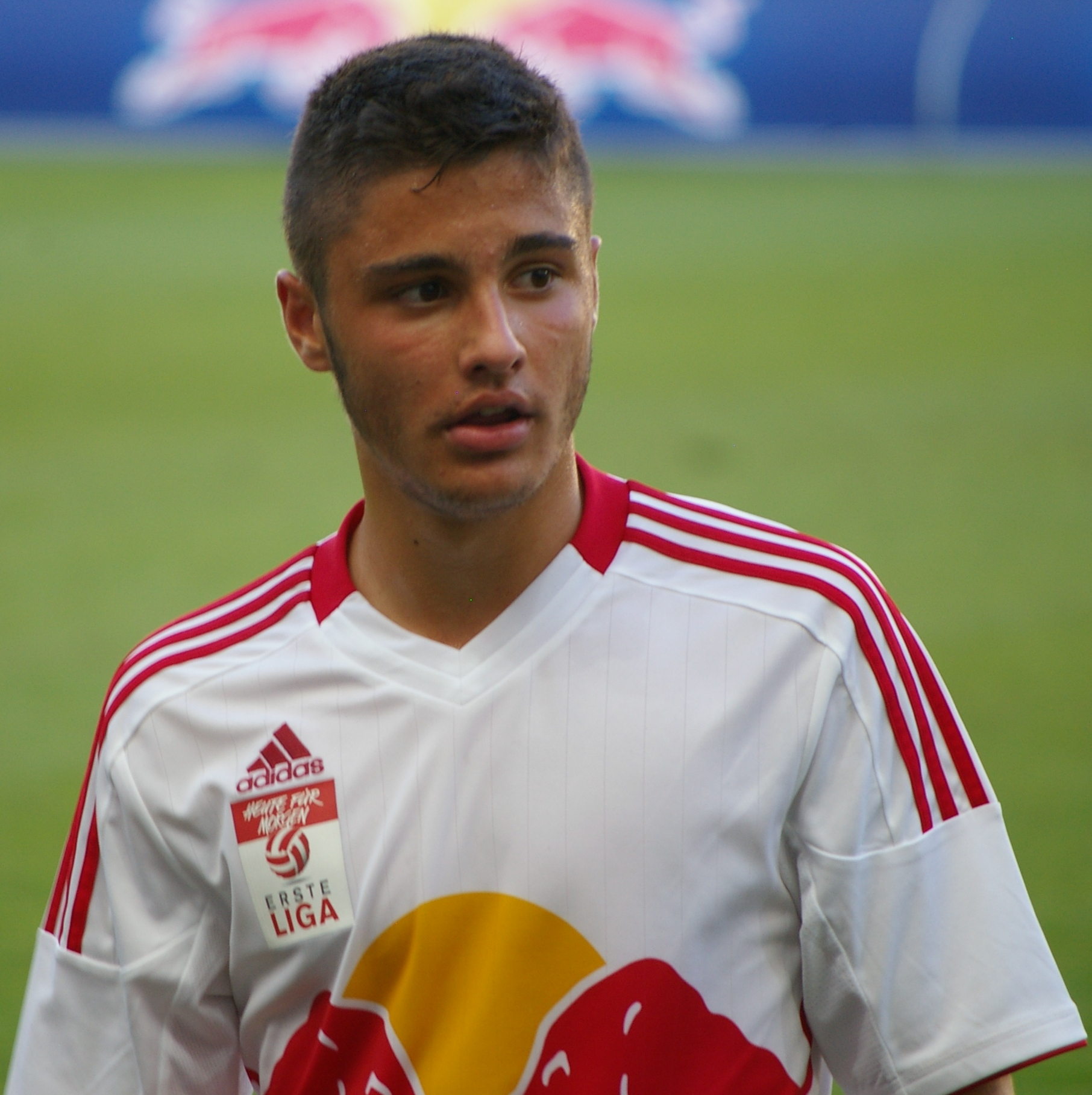
- Roguljić with Liefering in 2013

Personal information
- Date of birth: 11 March 1996 (age 30)
- Place of birth: Split, Croatia
- Height: 1.80 m (5 ft 11 in)
- Position: Midfielder

Team information
- Current team: Borac Banja Luka
- Number: 44

Youth career
- 2002–2010: Omladinac Vranjic
- 2010–2013: Adriatic Split

Senior career*
| Years | Team | Apps | (Gls) |
| 2012–2013 | Adriatic Split | 12 | (4) |
| 2013–2015 | Liefering | 49 | (9) |
| 2014–2017 | Red Bull Salzburg | 1 | (0) |
| 2015–2016 | → Hajduk Split (loan) | 19 | (1) |
| 2016–2017 | → Admira Wacker (loan) | 3 | (0) |
| 2017 | → Wacker Innsbruck (loan) | 8 | (1) |
| 2017–2018 | Pafos | 22 | (2) |
| 2018–2021 | Trenčín | 58 | (12) |
| 2021–2024 | Universitatea Craiova | 58 | (9) |
| 2024 | → Universitatea Cluj (loan) | 13 | (3) |
| 2024–2025 | Anorthosis Famagusta | 20 | (4) |
| 2025–2026 | Diósgyőr | 15 | (1) |
| 2026– | Borac Banja Luka | 7 | (2) |

International career
| 2010–2011 | Croatia U15 | 6 | (1) |
| 2012 | Croatia U16 | 12 | (5) |
| 2012–2013 | Croatia U17 | 20 | (11) |
| 2013–2014 | Croatia U18 | 7 | (2) |
| 2014–2015 | Croatia U19 | 6 | (4) |
| 2014–2018 | Croatia U21 | 2 | (0) |
- * Club domestic league appearances and goals as of 16 September 2026

Ante Roguljić (born 11 March 1996) is a Croatian professional footballer who plays as a midfielder for Bosnian Premier League club Borac Banja Luka.

== Club career ==
Having played in the youth teams of Omladinac Vranjic and NK Adriatic Split, Roguljić joined Red Bull Salzburg in July 2013 following Croatia's EU accession. He was immediately loaned to the club's farm team FC Liefering to gain first-team experience. He made his debut on 2 August 2013 in a 4–1 win against Parndorf, and he scored his first goal in the following game, a 5–1 win against Rheindorf Altach on 6 August. He made a total of 21 appearances in his debut season for FC Liefering in the Erste Liga, scoring three goals and managing two assists, playing mostly as a central or attacking midfielder.

Red Bull Salzburg decided to send Roguljić back on loan to FC Liefering, their feeder team, for the 2014–15 season. Roguljić enjoyed good form for Liefering in the first half of the season and so was called up to Red Bull Salzburg's first team for their cup match against Wacker Innsbruck, where he came on as a substitute and scored the winner in extra time in a 1–2 victory. On 1 November 2014, he made his league debut against Admira Wacker, playing 46 minutes before being replaced by Konrad Laimer.

He went on a loan to Hajduk Split in the summer of 2015 where he was wanted by coach Damir Burić. In the beginning, he was regularly picked in the first team and played an important role during Hajduk's European qualification campaign in the summer. Later, he started to underperform and was put on the bench where he mostly spent the rest of the season. In May 2016, his loan with Hajduk ended.

On 11 July 2025 Roguljić signed for Nemzeti Bajnokság I club Diósgyőri VTK.

== Career statistics ==
As of match played 16 September 2026

Appearances and goals by club, season and competition
| Club | Season | League | | | National cup (Note: Includes Austrian Cup, Croatian Cup, Slovak Cup, Cupa României, Cypriot Cup, Magyar Kupa) | | Continental | | Other | | Total | |
| Club | Season | Division | Apps | Goals | Apps | Goals | Apps | Goals | Apps | Goals | Apps | Goals |
|---|---|---|---|---|---|---|---|---|---|---|---|---|
| Liefering | 2013–14 | Erste Liga | 21 | 3 | — | | — | | — | | 21 | 3 |
| Liefering | 2014–15 | Erste Liga | 28 | 6 | — | | — | | — | | 28 | 6 |
| Liefering | Total | | 49 | 9 | — | | — | | — | | 49 | 9 |
| Red Bull Salzburg | 2014–15 | Austrian Bundesliga | 1 | 0 | 1 | 1 | — | | — | | 2 | 1 |
| Hajduk Split (loan) | 2015–16 | Prva HNL | 19 | 1 | 2 | 1 | 6 (Note: Appearances in UEFA Europa League) | 0 | — | | 27 | 2 |
| Admira Wacker (loan) | 2016–17 | Austrian Bundesliga | 3 | 0 | 0 | 0 | 1 | 0 | — | | 4 | 0 |
| Wacker Innsbruck (loan) | 2016–17 | Erste Liga | 8 | 1 | — | | — | | — | | 8 | 1 |
| Pafos | 2017–18 | Cypriot First Division | 22 | 2 | 0 | 0 | — | | — | | 22 | 2 |
| Trenčín | 2018–19 | Slovak First League | 13 | 1 | 0 | 0 | — | | 2 (Note: Appearances in 2018–19 Slovak First League relegation play-offs) | 1 | 15 | 2 |
| Trenčín | 2019–20 | Slovak First League | 25 | 8 | 4 | 6 | — | | 1 (Note: Appearance in 2019–20 Slovak First League Europa League play-offs) | 0 | 30 | 14 |
| Trenčín | 2020–21 | Slovak First League | 16 | 2 | 2 | 0 | — | | — | | 18 | 2 |
| Trenčín | Total | | 54 | 11 | 6 | 6 | 0 | 0 | 3 | 1 | 63 | 18 |
| Universitatea Craiova | 2021–22 | Liga I | 18 | 5 | 2 | 0 | — | | 1 (Note: Appearance in 2021–22 Liga I European play-offs) | 0 | 21 | 5 |
| Universitatea Craiova | 2022–23 | Liga I | 27 | 1 | 2 | 0 | 5 (Note: Appearances in UEFA Europa Conference League) | 1 | — | | 34 | 2 |
| Universitatea Craiova | 2023–24 | Liga I | 12 | 3 | 2 | 0 | — | | — | | 14 | 3 |
| Universitatea Craiova | Total | | 57 | 9 | 6 | 0 | 5 | 1 | 1 | 0 | 69 | 10 |
| Universitatea Cluj (loan) | 2023–24 | Liga I | 12 | 3 | 2 | 0 | — | | 1 (Note: Appearance in 2023–24 Liga I European play-offs) | 0 | 15 | 3 |
| Anorthosis Famagusta | 2024–25 | Cypriot First Division | 20 | 4 | 1 | 1 | — | | — | | 21 | 5 |
| Diósgyőr | 2025–26 | Nemzeti Bajnokság I | 15 | 1 | 2 | 0 | — | | — | | 17 | 1 |
| Borac Banja Luka | 2026–27 | Bosnian Premier League | 7 | 2 | 0 | 0 | 8 (Note: Two appearances in UEFA Champions League; six appearances and two goals in UEFA Conference League) | 2 | — | | 15 | 4 |
| Career totals | | | 267 | 43 | 20 | 9 | 20 | 3 | 5 | 1 | 312 | 56 |

== International career ==
Roguljić has represented Croatia at various youth levels. He also represented his country at both the 2013 UEFA European Under-17 Championship and the 2013 FIFA U-17 World Cup.
