= Fabrizio Anzalone =

Italian footballer (born 1978)

Personal information
- Date of birth: 24 July 1978 (age 48)
- Place of birth: Genoa, Italy
- Height: 1.87 m (6 ft 1 1/2 in)
- Position: Centre-back

Youth career
- Genoa

Senior career*
Years	Team	Apps	(Gls)
1997–2000	Genoa	1	(0)
1997–1998	→ Catanzaro (loan)	10	(2)
1998–1999	→ Fiorenzuola (loan)	2	(0)
1999–2000	→ Imperia (loan)	22	(0)
2000–2002	Spezia	7	(0)
2002–2003	Alzano	39	(4)
2003–2010	Ravenna	171	(6)
2009	→ Cremonese (loan)	8	(0)
2010–2013	Carrarese	66	(5)
- * Club domestic league appearances and goals

Fabrizio Anzalone (born 24 July 1978) is an Italian former footballer. He played over 140 games in Serie C1 and over 110 games in Serie C2. He only briefly played in Serie B in 2006–07 season.

== Biography ==
=== Early career ===
Born in Genoa, Liguria, Anzalone started his career at Genoa C.F.C. He made his Serie B debut on 13 April 1997, replacing Filippo Masolini in the final minutes. Since 1997–98 season he was loaned to Serie C2 teams Catanzaro, Fiorenzuola and Imperia. In mid-2000 he was sold to Serie C1 and Ligurian side Spezia. He only played 7 times before transferred to Alzano in January 2002, as the club bought Spezia's half. In June 2002 Genoa gave up the remain 50% registration rights to Alzano. He played 26 times in 2002–03 Serie C1 but the team bankrupted at the end of season.

=== Ravenna ===
Since 2003–04 season Anzalone played for Ravenna Calcio, winning promotion play-offs in 2005 (partnered with Marco Bianchi as centre-backs) and after two seasons in Serie C1, promoted to Serie B in 2007 as Group B champion. The team relegated back to Prima Divisione in 2008. On 2 February 2009 he was exchanged with Antonio Rizzo of Cremonese. He only played 18 games in 2009–10 Lega Pro Prima Divisione.

=== Carrarese ===
On 6 August 2010 he was transferred to Seconda Divisione side Carrarese. he played 25 games and plus all 4 games in promotion play-offs, partnering Maikol Benassi. He also played the first two games of the cup. Carrarese was promoted as play-offs winner.

On 18 June 2011 he signed a new 1-year contract.
