= Erik Janža =

Slovenian footballer (born 1993)

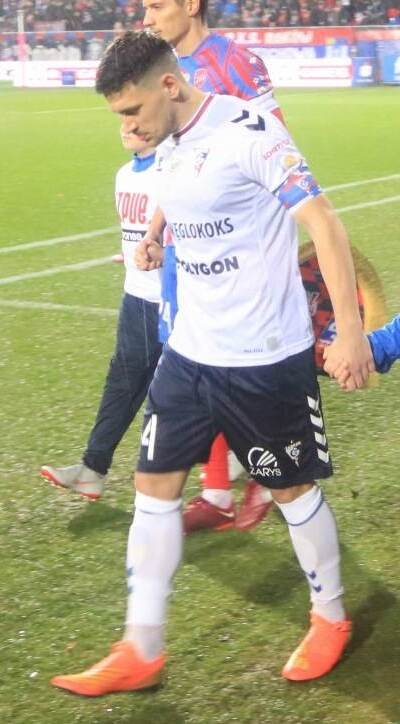
- Janža with Górnik Zabrze in 2023

Personal information
- Date of birth: 21 June 1993 (age 33)
- Place of birth: Murska Sobota, Slovenia
- Height: 1.75 m (5 ft 9 in)
- Position: Left-back

Team information
- Current team: Górnik Zabrze
- Number: 64

Youth career
- Puconci
- 2007–2012: Mura 05

Senior career*
Years	Team	Apps	(Gls)
2010–2013	Mura 05	76	(1)
2013–2015	Domžale	66	(4)
2015–2016	Maribor	33	(0)
2017–2018	Viktoria Plzeň	3	(0)
2017–2018	→ Pafos (loan)	33	(2)
2018–2019	Osijek	19	(0)
2019–	Górnik Zabrze	223	(10)

International career^{‡}
2009	Slovenia U16	1	(0)
2010	Slovenia U18	4	(0)
2011–2012	Slovenia U19	18	(1)
2011–2013	Slovenia U20	3	(0)
2013–2014	Slovenia U21	9	(0)
2014–	Slovenia	37	(3)
- * Club domestic league appearances and goals as of 12:16, 8 November 2026 (UTC) ‡ National team caps and goals as of 23:23, 16 November 2026 (UTC)

Erik Janža (born 21 June 1993) is a Slovenian professional footballer who plays as a left-back for Ekstraklasa club Górnik Zabrze, which he captains, and the Slovenia national team.

== Club career ==
Janža started his senior career with Mura 05 in 2010. With Mura 05, he reached the play-off round of the 2012–13 UEFA Europa League, where the club were eliminated by Lazio. In January 2013, he joined Domžale, followed by Maribor in January 2015, with whom he won both the Slovenian League and Slovenian Cup titles.

In January 2017, Janža moved abroad to join Czech side Viktoria Plzeň, and was subsequently loaned out to Cypriot club Pafos. In July 2018, he transferred to Croatian side Osijek.

On 28 June 2019, he signed a two-year contract with Polish Ekstraklasa club Górnik Zabrze. On 21 November 2021, he scored his first goal for the club in a 3–2 win over Legia Warszawa. He became the club's captain ahead of the 2022–23 season. On 15 June 2024, Janža extended his contract with Górnik Zabrze until 2026.

== International career ==
Janža represented Slovenia at youth international levels from under-16 to under-21.

He made his debut for the senior national team on 18 November 2014, in a 1–0 friendly defeat against Colombia. On 14 October 2023, he scored his first international goal in a 3–0 victory over Finland during the UEFA Euro 2024 qualifying.

On 7 June 2024, he was selected in the 26-man squad for the UEFA Euro 2024. In the opening match, Janža scored the equalizer in a 1–1 draw against Denmark, which was Slovenia's first goal at the European Championship since their last participation 24 years ago.

== Career statistics ==
=== Club ===
As of match played 7 November 2026

Appearances and goals by club, season and competition
Club	Season	League			National cup (Note: Includes Slovenian Cup, Cypriot Cup, Croatian Cup, Polish Cup)		Continental		Other		Total	
Club	Season	Division	Apps	Goals	Apps	Goals	Apps	Goals	Apps	Goals	Apps	Goals
Mura 05	2010–11	Slovenian Second League	25	1	1	0	—		—		26	1
Mura 05	2011–12	Slovenian PrvaLiga	31	0	0	0	—		—		31	0
Mura 05	2012–13	Slovenian PrvaLiga	20	0	1	0	8 (Note: Appearances in UEFA Europa League)	0	—		29	0
Mura 05	Total		76	1	2	0	8	0	—		86	1
Domžale	2012–13	Slovenian PrvaLiga	12	0	0	0	—		—		12	0
Domžale	2013–14	Slovenian PrvaLiga	35	4	3	0	2	0	—		40	4
Domžale	2014–15	Slovenian PrvaLiga	19	0	1	0	—		—		20	0
Domžale	Total		66	4	4	0	2	0	—		72	4
Maribor	2014–15	Slovenian PrvaLiga	6	0	2	0	—		—		8	0
Maribor	2015–16	Slovenian PrvaLiga	11	0	3	0	0	0	—		14	0
Maribor	2016–17	Slovenian PrvaLiga	16	0	2	0	6	0	—		24	0
Maribor	Total		33	0	7	0	6	0	—		46	0
Viktoria Plzeň	2016–17	Czech First League	3	0	0	0	—		—		3	0
Pafos (loan)	2017–18	Cypriot First Division	33	2	5	1	—		—		38	3
Osijek	2018–19	Croatian First League	19	0	2	0	0	0	—		21	0
Górnik Zabrze	2019–20	Ekstraklasa	36	0	0	0	—		—		36	0
Górnik Zabrze	2020–21	Ekstraklasa	28	0	3	0	—		—		31	0
Górnik Zabrze	2021–22	Ekstraklasa	32	1	2	0	—		—		34	1
Górnik Zabrze	2022–23	Ekstraklasa	32	2	3	0	—		—		35	2
Górnik Zabrze	2023–24	Ekstraklasa	23	0	1	0	—		—		24	0
Górnik Zabrze	2024–25	Ekstraklasa	28	2	0	0	—		—		28	2
Górnik Zabrze	2025–26	Ekstraklasa	32	4	5	0	—		—		37	4
Górnik Zabrze	2026–27	Ekstraklasa	12	1	1	0	5 (Note: Two appearances in UEFA Champions League, two appearances in UEFA Europa League, one appearance in UEFA Conference League)	0	1 (Note: Appearance in Polish Super Cup)	0	19	1
Górnik Zabrze	Total		223	10	15	0	5	0	1	0	244	10
Career total			453	17	35	1	21	0	1	0	510	18

=== International ===
As of match played 16 November 2026

Appearances and goals by national team and year
National team	Year	Apps	Goals
Slovenia
Slovenia	2014	1	0
Slovenia	2023	6	2
Slovenia	2024	12	1
Slovenia	2025	10	0
Slovenia	2026	8	0
Total		37	3

Scores and results list Slovenia's goal tally first, score column indicates score after each Janža goal.

List of international goals scored by Erik Janža
No.	Date	Venue	Opponent	Score	Result	Competition
1	14 October 2023	Stožice Stadium, Ljubljana, Slovenia	Finland	3–0	3–0	UEFA Euro 2024 qualifying
2	17 November 2023	Parken Stadium, Copenhagen, Denmark	Denmark	1–1	1–2	UEFA Euro 2024 qualifying
3	16 June 2024	MHPArena, Stuttgart, Germany	Denmark	1–1	1–1	UEFA Euro 2024

== Honours ==
Maribor

- Slovenian PrvaLiga: 2014–15
- Slovenian Cup: 2015–16

Górnik Zabrze

- Polish Cup: 2025–26
