= Jan Koprivec =

Slovenian footballer (born 1988)

Personal information
- Date of birth: 15 July 1988 (age 38)
- Place of birth: Koper, SR Slovenia, Yugoslavia
- Height: 1.87 m (6 ft 2 in)
- Position: Goalkeeper

Youth career
- –2007: Koper
- 2003: → Jadran Dekani (loan)

Senior career*
Years	Team	Apps	(Gls)
2006–2007	Koper	0	(0)
2007–2008	Cagliari	0	(0)
2008–2012	Udinese	1	(0)
2009–2010	→ Gallipoli (loan)	11	(0)
2011–2012	→ Bari (loan)	0	(0)
2012–2015	Perugia	78	(0)
2015–2017	Anorthosis	66	(0)
2017–2019	Pafos	32	(0)
2019–2020	Kilmarnock	5	(0)
2020–2023	Tabor Sežana	101	(0)
2023–2025	Koper	30	(0)

International career
2004	Slovenia U16	1	(0)
2006	Slovenia U19	1	(0)
2009	Slovenia U20	1	(0)
2008–2010	Slovenia U21	10	(0)
2016	Slovenia	1	(0)
- * Club domestic league appearances and goals as of 24 July 2025

Jan Koprivec (born 15 July 1988) is a Slovenian footballer who plays as a goalkeeper.

== Club career ==
Koprivec started his career at Koper. In summer 2007, Koprivec joined Cagliari, and played two matches in the 2007–08 Coppa Italia, both of which Cagliari won; however, he did not make any appearances in the league.

In July 2008, Koprivec moved to Udinese, and immediately joined them in pre-season training. He made his league debut for Udinese on 22 March 2009 against Genoa.

On 17 August 2009, Koprivec was loaned out to Serie B side Gallipoli. He made his debut four days later, in a 1–1 draw with Ascoli. During the season, he played only eleven games with the club from Salento due to an injury that hampered his settling into the first team. He returned to Udinese at the end of the season, and was then included into the first team as a second-choice goalkeeper behind fellow Slovenian Samir Handanović.

On 15 July 2015, Anorthosis Famagusta announced that Koprivec signed a 2+1 year contract with the Cypriot club. In May 2017 it was announced that Koprivec would leave the club at the end of the season.

On 10 September 2019, Koprivec signed for Scottish Premiership club Kilmarnock on a one-year contract. He was released by the club at the end of his contract.

In August 2020, Koprivec returned to Slovenia after 13 years and signed with Tabor Sežana of the Slovenian PrvaLiga.

== International career ==
Koprivec got his first call up to the Slovenia senior side for the team's 2018 FIFA World Cup qualifiers against Slovakia and England in October 2016. He made his debut for the national team in a November 2016 friendly match against Poland, which was also his only international appearance for Slovenia.
