= Boy Deul =

Dutch footballer

Personal information
- Full name: Boy Darryl Deul
- Date of birth: 30 August 1987 (age 39)
- Place of birth: Amsterdam, Netherlands
- Height: 1.78 m (5 ft 10 in)
- Position: Attacking midfielder

Youth career
- CVV Willemstad
- Abcoude
- Volendam

Senior career*
Years	Team	Apps	(Gls)
2005–2008	Volendam	38	(12)
2008–2010	Willem II	11	(0)
2010–2012	Bayern Munich II	43	(7)
2012–2013	Veendam	24	(6)
2014–2016	Emmen	56	(17)
2016–2017	Stal Kamianske	18	(2)
2017–2018	Pafos	32	(6)
2018–2022	Volendam	112	(23)
Total		334	(73)
- * Club domestic league appearances and goals as of 6 May 2022

Boy Darryl Deul (born 30 August 1987) is a Dutch retired footballer.

== Club career ==
He has previously played for Bayern Munich II, FC Volendam, Willem II and SC Veendam. In 2014, he joined FC Emmen.

He moved abroad to play for Ukrainian side Stal Kamianske in summer 2016. However, he did not receive five months salary because the club eventually went bankrupt.

In 2017, he moved to Cypriot club Pafos. On 16 August 2018, he left the Cypriot club and signed a contract for one season with Eerste Divisie club FC Volendam, returning to the club where he made his professional football debut.
