= Miguelito (footballer, born March 1990) =

Portuguese footballer

Personal information
- Full name: Luís Miguel Teixeira Ribeiro
- Date of birth: 9 March 1990 (age 36)
- Place of birth: Amarante, Portugal
- Height: 1.84 m (6 ft 0 in)
- Position: Midfielder

Youth career
- 1998–2009: Amarante

Senior career*
Years	Team	Apps	(Gls)
2009–2016	Amarante	153	(25)
2016–2018	Olympiakos Nicosia	35	(3)
2018–2019	Amarante	29	(6)
2019–2021	Ethnikos Achna	51	(7)
2021–2025	Nea Salamina	110	(16)
- * Club domestic league appearances and goals as of 18:00, 18 January 2025 (UTC)

Luís Miguel Ribeiro Teixeira (born 9 March 1990), known as Miguelito, is a Portuguese professional footballer who plays as a midfielder.

== Career ==
On 21 August 2017, Miguelito made his professional debut with Olympiakos Nicosia in a 2017–18 Cypriot First Division match against Doxa.

In the summer of 2019, Miguelito returned to Cyprus to join first division side Ethnikos Achna. In his league debut against Paralimi on 26 August, Miguelito scored twice to help his side to a 4–3 win.
