= Abdelaye Diakité =

French footballer (born 1990)

Personal information
- Date of birth: 8 January 1990 (age 36)
- Place of birth: Les Mureaux, France
- Height: 1.90 m (6 ft 3 in)
- Position: Centre-back

Team information
- Current team: Nea Salamina
- Number: 78

Youth career
- –2008: Le Havre

Senior career*
Years	Team	Apps	(Gls)
2009–2010	Le Havre B	8	(0)
2011–2013	Racing Aprilia	45	(4)
2013–2015	Parma	0	(0)
2013	→ ND Gorica (loan)	23	(0)
2014–2015	→ Teramo (loan)	23	(0)
2015	KF Bylis Ballsh	5	(0)
2016–2017	Siracusa	15	(0)
2017–2018	Alki Oroklini	32	(3)
2018	Al Ahli Tripoli	0	(0)
2019	Menemenspor	10	(0)
2020	Politehnica Iași	0	(0)
2020–2021	FC U Craiova	7	(0)
2021–	Nea Salamina	89	(12)

International career
2009	France U20	0	(0)
- * Club domestic league appearances and goals as of 13:47, 10 May 2025 (UTC)

Abdelaye Diakité (born 8 January 1990) is a French professional footballer who plays as a centre-back for Cypriot club Nea Salamina.

== Career ==
Born in Les Mureaux, a suburb of Paris, Diakité started his career at Le Havre. He was a player for their B team from 2008 to 2010 in Championnat de France amateur. In 2009, he received his only France U20 national team call-up, against Morocco. He was an unused bench. After a season long injury, Diakité moved to Italy in 2011 for the fourth division club Aprilia. In March 2013 Diakité signed a pre-contract with Parma. However, in July 2013 half of the registration rights was swapped with half of the "card" of Crotone player Giuseppe Caccavallo. Diakité was trained separately from the squad since 21 July due to fitness problem.

On 30 August 2013, Diakité left for Slovenian club Gorica. The paperwork of his transfer was completed on 24 October. In January 2014 the temporary deal was terminated. During 2013 financial year the co-ownership between Crotone and Parma also terminated in favour of Parma, with Giuseppe Prestia moved to Crotone.

On 18 July 2014, he was signed by Teramo along with Gianluca Lapadula.

On 20 August 2015, he was signed by Bylis.

On 15 September 2018, he engaged with Libyan club Al Ahli SC Tripoli.

== Honours ==
FC U Craiova

- Liga II: 2020–21
