= Benjamín =

Ghanaian footballer

Personal information
- Full name: Benjamín Akoto Asamoah
- Date of birth: 4 January 1994 (age 32)
- Place of birth: Accra, Ghana
- Height: 1.78 m (5 ft 10 in)
- Position: Midfielder

Youth career
- Rayo Majadahonda
- Atlético Madrid

Senior career*
Years	Team	Apps	(Gls)
2013–2014	Atlético Madrid C	29	(0)
2014–2016	Atlético Madrid B	56	(4)
2016–2017	Hospitalet	34	(0)
2017–2023	Doxa Katokopias	169	(12)
2023–2024	ENAD Polis	29	(5)
2024–2025	Tudelano	11	(1)
2025	Al-Tuhami		
- * Club domestic league appearances and goals as of 13 October 2024

Benjamín Akoto Asamoah (born 4 January 1994) is a Ghanaian footballer who plays as a midfielder.

== Club career ==
Born in Accra, Benjamín arrived at the youth academy of Atlético Madrid from the Rayo Majadahonda counterpart in 2012. After a stint with Atlético Madrid C, he was promoted to the B-team in 2012. On 29 May 2015, his contract was extended by the club till June 2017. On 3 August 2016, he moved to fellow Spanish club Hospitalet.

On 6 August 2017, Benjamín joined Cypriot First Division club Doxa where he was assigned the 17 number jersey.

On 10 January 2025, Benjamín joined Saudi Third Division side Al-Tuhami.

== Club statistics ==
As of match played on 13 May 2018

Club	Season	League			Cup		Continental		Total	
Club	Season	Division	Apps	Goals	Apps	Goals	Apps	Goals	Apps	Goals
Atlético Madrid B	2013–14	Segunda División B	0	0	—		2 (Note: Appearances in Relegation Play-offs)	0	2	0
Atlético Madrid B	2014–15	Segunda División B	32	2	—		—		32	2
Atlético Madrid B	2015–16	Tercera División	24	2	—		2	0	26	2
Atlético Madrid B	Total		56	4	—		4	0	60	4
Hospitalet	2016–17	Segunda División B	34	0	0	0	—		34	0
Doxa Katokopias	2017–18	Cypriot First Division	32	5	3	1	—		35	6
Career total			122	9	3	1	4	0	129	10
