= Gerasimos Fylaktou =

Cypriot footballer

Personal information
- Date of birth: 24 July 1991 (age 35)
- Place of birth: Nicosia, Cyprus
- Height: 1.74 m (5 ft 9 in)
- Position: Central midfielder

Team information
- Current team: Digenis Akritas Morphou
- Number: 23

Youth career
- Digenis Akritas Morphou

Senior career*
Years	Team	Apps	(Gls)
2009–2012	Digenis Akritas Morphou	41	(1)
2012–2014	Alki Larnaca	36	(0)
2014–2018	Omonia	47	(0)
2017–2018	→ Pafos (loan)	28	(2)
2018–2019	Ermis Aradippou	25	(1)
2019–2022	Pafos	24	(0)
2023–2024	APOP Polis Chrysochous	19	(0)
2024–	Digenis Akritas Morphou	39	(2)

International career^{‡}
2007–2008	Cyprus U-17	2	(0)
2008–2010	Cyprus U-19	5	(0)
2010–2012	Cyprus U21	5	(0)
2017–	Cyprus	1	(0)
- * Club domestic league appearances and goals as of 3 May 2026 ‡ National team caps and goals as of 10 November 2017

Gerasimos Fylaktou (Greek: Γεράσιμος Φυλακτού; born 24 July 1991) is a Cypriot footballer who plays as a central midfielder for Digenis Akritas Morphou.

== Club career ==
Fylaktou started his playing career from Digenis Morphou. In the summer of 2012 he transferred to Alki Larnaca to play for the first time in the Cypriot First Division. On 4 July 2014 he signed a contract with Omonia making the big step in his career. On 24 July 2017 he was given on loan to Pafos.

== Career statistics ==
=== Club ===
As of match played 2 September 2021

Club	Season	League			Cup		Continental		Other		Total	
Club	Season	Division	Apps	Goals	Apps	Goals	Apps	Goals	Apps	Goals	Apps	Goals
Alki Larnaca	2012–13	Cypriot First Division	12	0	1	0	—		—		13	0
Alki Larnaca	2013–14	Cypriot First Division	24	0	4	1	—		—		28	1
Alki Larnaca	Total		36	0	5	1	—		—		41	1
Omonia	2014–15	Cypriot First Division	14	0	1	0	2	0	—		17	0
Omonia	2015–16	Cypriot First Division	19	0	3	0	3	0	—		25	0
Omonia	2016–17	Cypriot First Division	13	0	0	0	4	0	—		17	0
Omonia	Total		46	0	4	0	9	0	—		59	0
Pafos (loan)	2017–18	Cypriot First Division	28	2	5	1	—		—		33	3
Ermis Aradippou	2018–19	Cypriot First Division	25	1	2	0	—		—		27	1
Pafos	2019–20	Cypriot First Division	2	0	0	0	—		—		2	0
Pafos	2020–21	Cypriot First Division	18	0	0	0	—		—		18	0
Pafos	2021–22	Cypriot First Division	4	0	1	0	—		—		5	0
Pafos	2022–23	Cypriot First Division	0	0	0	0	—		—		0	0
Pafos	Total		24	0	1	0	—		—		25	0
Career Total			159	3	17	2	9	0	0	0	185	5
