= Christian Brüls =

Belgian footballer (born 1988)

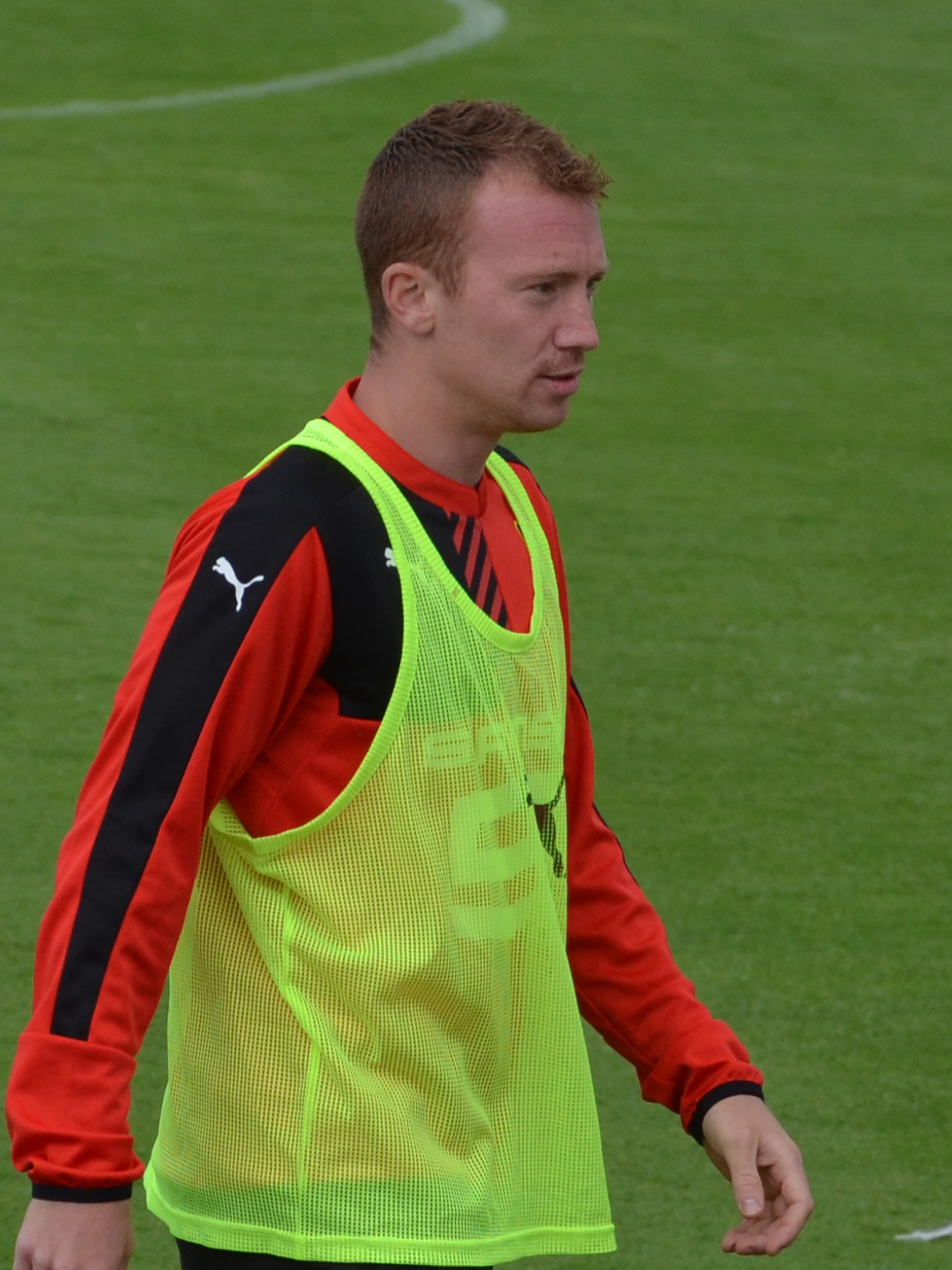
- Brüls in 2015.

Personal information
- Date of birth: 30 September 1988 (age 38)
- Place of birth: Malmedy, Belgium
- Height: 1.79 m (5 ft 10 in)
- Position: Attacking midfielder

Team information
- Current team: Beveren
- Number: 22

Youth career
- Grün-Weiß Amel
- 1997–2003: Eupen

Senior career*
Years	Team	Apps	(Gls)
2005–2008	Eupen	54	(4)
2008	Trabzonspor	0	(0)
2008–2010	MVV	65	(7)
2010–2011	Westerlo	39	(5)
2011–2014	Gent	69	(7)
2013–2014	→ Nice (loan)	34	(2)
2014–2017	Rennes	9	(0)
2014–2017	Rennes B	9	(0)
2015–2016	→ Standard Liège (loan)	10	(1)
2017	Eupen	16	(1)
2017–2018	Pafos	29	(2)
2019–2020	Westerlo	54	(16)
2021–2023	Sint-Truiden	65	(9)
2023–2024	Zulte Waregem	40	(1)
2024–	Beveren	43	(6)
- * Club domestic league appearances and goals as of 19 April 2026

Christian Brüls (born 30 September 1988) is a Belgian professional footballer who plays as an attacking midfielder for Challenger Pro League club Beveren.

== Career ==
=== Eupen ===
Born in Malmedy, Belgium, Brüls began playing football when he was four, signing for Grün-Weiß Amel. He remained at the club until he joined Eupen when he was a minor and at the club he started his career. Brüls made his Eupen debut on 10 December 2005, coming on as a substitute for goal scorer Gilles Colin, in a 2–0 win over Oud-Heverlee Leuven and went on to make six appearances for the club that season. In the 2006–07 season, Brüls made his first appearance for the club on 30 August 2006, when he played for 72 minutes, in a 3–1 win over Dessel Sport. However, Brüls' appearance was restricted to fourteen appearances in all competition despite the club's faced the season with injury crisis.

In the 2007–08 season, Brüls started the season well and scored his first goal for the club on 15 September 2007, in a 3–1 win over Deinze. Brüls' second goal for the club then came on 11 November 2007, in a 1–0 win over Vigor Wuitens Hamme and his third goal came a month later on 15 December 2007, in a 3–3 draw against Oostende. His fourth goal came on 18 February 2008, in a 4–1 win over Namur. Brüls made thirty-two appearances and scored four times in all competition despite suffering from a foot injury.

Partly because of his strong performances for the young Red Devils, he attracted the interest of some Belgian top clubs, including Club Brugge, Germinal Beerschot and Gent.

=== MVV Maastricht ===
Nevertheless, he chose to play for Dutch Jupiler League club MVV Maastricht, signing a four-year contract on 23 June 2008. It was a hectic transfer-season for Brüls, as Trabzonspor had signed him first. After some negotiations between MVV Maastricht and Trabzonspor, Brüls had permission to play for the Dutch side.

Brüls made his MVV Maastricht debut in the opening game of the season, making his first start, in a 0–0 draw against PEC Zwolle. Two weeks later on 22 August 2008, he set up two goals, in a 3–1 win over Helmond Sport. Brüls scored his first MVV Maastricht goal on 31 October 2008, in a 3–2 win over AGOVV Apeldoorn. Brüls scored two more goals later in the season against Zwolle, as well as, providing a hat-trick assists and Dordrecht. Despite suffering from an injury, Brüls finished his first season at the club, making thirty-seven appearances and scoring three times in all competition.

The 2009–10 season saw Brüls continued to be a first team regular at the club and scored his first goal of the season on 15 September 2009, in a 3–1 win over Veendam. Brüls later scored three more goals later in the season against Volendam (which he also scored in another encounter on 19 February 2010) and Eindhoven. Brüls finished the 2009–10 season, making thirty-four appearances and scoring four times in all competition.

=== Westerlo ===
On 22 June 2010, Brüls returned to Belgium after two years away from the country, signing for Westerlo on a two–year contract. However, according to the transfer, MVV Maastricht received a small transfer fee from Westerlo.

Brüls made his Westerlo debut in the opening game of the season, making his first start and played the whole game, in a 1–0 loss against Gent. It wasn't until on 29 August 2010 when he scored his first Westerlo goal, in a 2–1 loss against Club Brugge. His second came on 13 November 2010, in a 1–0 win over Charleroi. As the 2010–11 season progressed, Brüls scored three more goals against Standard Liège, Lokeren and Zulte Waregem. He also provided two assists, in a 2–0 win over Anderlecht on 20 February 2011. Brüls finished his first season at Westerlo, making thirty–nine appearances and scoring five times in all competition.

At the start of the 2011–12 season, Brüls played his first Europa League game, where he started and played the whole game, in a 1–0 win over TPS in the first leg of the second round. After missing out the second leg, Brüls scored his first goal of the season in the first leg of the third round, in a 3–1 loss against Young Boys and was eliminated from the Europa League after losing 2–0 in the second leg. Brüls played five league appearances for Westerlo and provided two assists against Gent and Cercle Brugge.

=== Gent ===
His display at Westerlo attracted interests from Gent and Genk. Brüls joined Gent on 31 August 2011, signing a four-year contract, and saw Shlomi Arbeitman joined Westerlo on a season–long loan. It appeared that Brüls was on verge of joining reigning champion Genk, signing a four-year contract with them before joining Gent instead.

Brüls made his Gent debut on 11 September 2011, where he set up one of the goals, in a 3–1 win over Zulte Waregem. Two weeks later on 24 September 2011, Brüls scored his first Gent goal and setting one of the goals, in a 4–3 win over Sint-Truidense It wasn't until on 21 April 2012 when Brüls scored his first goals, in a 4–1 win over Kortrijk. Four weeks later on 10 May 2012, Brüls scored again, in a 2–1 loss against Standard Liège. Brüls finished the 2011–12 season, making forty appearances and scoring three times in all competitions and was the club's top assister with eighteen.

The 2012–13 season saw Brüls start the season for Gent when he provided two assists, in a 3–2 win over Differdange 03 in the second leg of the second round of the UEFA Europa League. However, in the second leg of the third round of the UEFA Europa League, Brüls received a straight red card in the 64th minute, in a 3–0 loss against Videoton and saw them eliminated from the competition after losing to them 4–0 on aggregate. Brüls then scored his first goal for the club, as well as, setting up one of the goals, in a 2–0 win over Waasland-Beveren on 18 August 2012, followed up by scoring in the next game on 26 August 2012, in a 2–1 win over Lokeren. It wasn't until on 18 May 2013 in the second leg of the league play–off Europa League against Oud-Heverlee Leuven, Brüls scored again, in a 4–1 victory for the club. Though the club were unsuccessful to qualify for the Europa League following a loss against Standard Liège and suffered his own injury concerns, Brüls finished the 2012–13 season, making forty–one appearances and scoring three times in all competition.

=== Nice (loan) ===
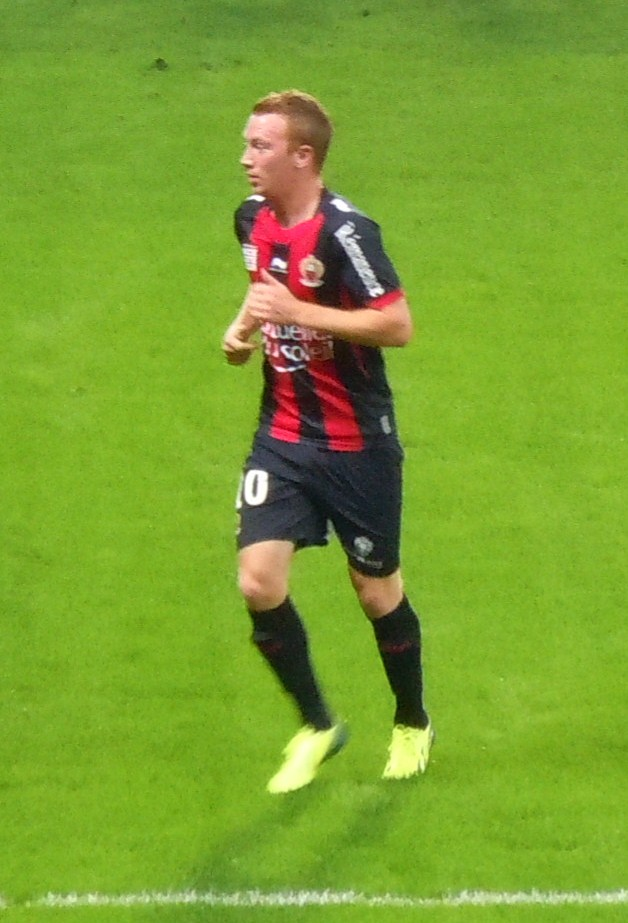
Brüls playing for Nice in 2013

Ligue 1 side Nice expressed their interests in signing Brüls and on 29 June 2013, he joined Nice on a season long loan deal, with an option of signing the player permanently. Upon joining the club, Brüls was given number ten shirt for the new season.

Brüls made his Nice debut, in the opening game of the season, making his first start, in a 4–0 loss against Lyon. In a match against Lille on 15 September 2013, Brüls provided a double assist for Darío Cvitanich, in a 2–0 win and it was followed up by scoring his first Nice goal, in a 4–0 win against Valenciennes. His performance throughout September earned him an award for Player of the Month by Nice supporters. January saw Brüls scored three more goals in all competition against Nantes, Ajaccio and Marseille. As the 2013–14 season progressed, Brüls went on to make thirty–eight appearances and scoring four times in all competition.

Following the conclusion to the season, it was announced that the club decided against signing Brüls on a permanent basis, citing sporting and financial as the main factor.

=== Stade Rennais ===
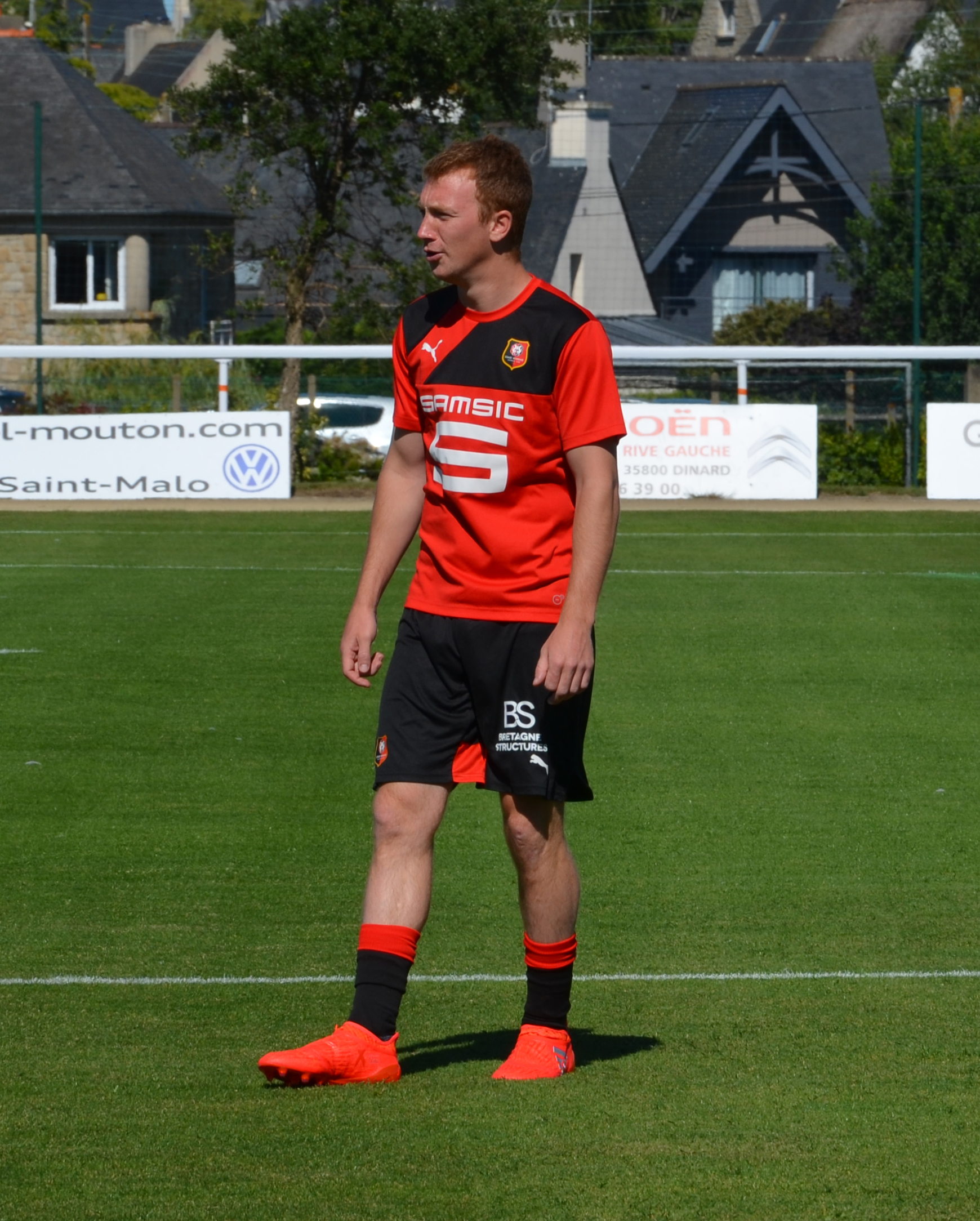
Brüls playing for Rennes in 2016

On 30 July 2014, Brüls signed for another Ligue 1 side, joining Rennes on a three–year contract. It wasn't until 6 October 2014 that Brüls was given number thirteen shirt.

Brüls suffered a foot injury at the start of the season and was sidelined for three months. In November 2014, Brüls recovered from a foot injury and made his full return to training. It wasn't until 29 November 2014 that Brüls made his Stade Rennais debut, coming on as a substitute in the second half, in a 2–0 win over Monaco. In the next game against Nice on 3 December 2014, Brüls set up a goal for Anders Konradsen, in a 2–1 win for Stade Rennais. However, Brüls' first season at Stade Rennais was restricted to twelve appearances in all competitions.

Ahead of the 2015–16 season, Brüls' first-team opportunities were expected to be limited after Philippe Montanier told him he wouldn't be featured in his plans. Following the end of his loan spell at Standard Liège, Brüls said he was uncertain about his future at Stade Rennais and whether or not he would play for the club the following season.

=== Standard Liège (loan) ===
Brüls returned to Belgium when he re–joined Standard Liège on a season-long loan deal on 18 August 2015.

Brüls scored on his Standard Liège debut, where he made his first start, in a 2–1 loss against Oostende. Thirty days later, on 23 September 2015, Brüls scored again in the sixth round of the Belgium Cup, in a 3–2 win over Coxyde. In a rivalry match against Anderlecht on 8 November 2015, Brüls received a red card after a second bookable offence, in a 1–0 win for Standard Liège. However, Brüls struggled at the club, due to his injuries concern and faced criticism from fans for his performance. As a result, his appearance was restricted to fourteen appearances and scoring once in all competition. Following this, Brüls returned to his parent club after being told by the club's management that he won't be returning.

=== Zulte Waregem ===
On 5 January 2023, Brüls signed a two-and-a-half-year contract with Zulte Waregem.

=== SK Beveren ===
On 26 December 2024, Brüls signed a one-and-a-half year contract with Beveren.

== Personal life ==
Born in Malmedy, Belgium, Brüls was raised in the German-speaking Community of Belgium and speaks German and French.

In addition to becoming a footballer, Brüls revealed he is planning to be a carpenter, having taken carpenter courses. Brüls also revealed he smoked cigarettes and while at Westerlo, he smoked ten to fifteen times a day. Brüls ultimately stopped smoking when he learned that his father, who was diagnosed with cancer, died in June 2011. In early 2012, Brüls became a father when his wife gave birth to their first child.

Brüls earned the nickname "Tintin".
