= Rafael Yiangoudakis =

Cypriot footballer

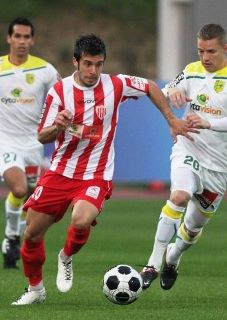
- Rafael Yiangoudakis vs AEK Larnaca

Personal information
- Full name: Rafael Yiangoudakis
- Date of birth: August 3, 1990 (age 36)
- Place of birth: Limassol, Cyprus
- Height: 1.76 m (5 ft 9 1/2 in)
- Positions: Left midfielder; left-back

Senior career*
Years	Team	Apps	(Gls)
2008–2010	Apollon Limassol	2	(0)
2009–2010	→ APEP Pitsilia (loan)	13	(0)
2010–2011	APEP Pitsilia	12	(1)
2011–2012	Nea Salamina	11	(0)
2012–2013	Nikos & Sokratis Erimis	18	(1)
2013–2014	Enosis Neon Parekklisia	24	(7)
2014–2015	Ethnikos Achna	22	(0)
2015–2017	Ermis Aradippou	32	(2)
2017	Kallithea	3	(0)
2017–2018	Pafos	4	(0)
2018–2020	Aris Limassol	19	(0)

International career
2010–2011	Cyprus U-21	11	(0)
- * Club domestic league appearances and goals as of 31 May 2019 (UTC)

Rafael Yiangoudakis (Greek: Ραφαήλ Γιαγκουδάκης; born August 3, 1990, in Limassol) is a Cypriot footballer, who plays as a midfielder.

== Club career ==
In 2008, Rafael Yiangoudakis made his debut with the Apollon Limassol first team and had 3 appearances. In the season 2009–2010, he had 15 appearances with APEP FC who played very well the position of left winger and left back. At the age of 17 he had appearances with the youth team of Allemania Aachen FC. Rafael Yiangoudakis is also a member of the Cyprus U-21 national team and counts more than 10 appearances.
