= 2019–20 Pafos FC season =

Pafos
2019–20 season
- Owner: Pavel Gognidze
- Manager: Željko Kopić (until 6 November); Jeremy Steele (Caretaker) (6 November-13 December); Cameron Toshack (from 13 December)
- Stadium: Stelios Kyriakides Stadium
- Cyta Championship: 7th
- Cypriot Cup: Second Round vs Anorthosis Famagusta
- Top goalscorer: League: Onni Valakari (5); All: Onni Valakari (5)
Home colours	Away colours

The 2019–20 season was Pafos's 6th year in existence, and third season in the Cypriot First Division.

== Season review ==
On 1 July, Pafos announced the signings of Artur Rudko from Dynamo Kyiv, Mickaël Panos from Saint-Étienne and Giorgos Valerianos from Aris Thessaloniki.

On 3 July, Brazilian defender, Jander, was sold to Red Star Belgrade for a club-record fee.

On 6 July, Pafos signed Nigerian International midfielder Sunny, who'd last played for Real Salt Lake, with Alex Konstantinou joining from Olympiakos Nicosia on 10 July, and Panagiotis Zachariou leaving the club by mutual agreement to join Olympiakos Nicosia on 11 July 2019.

On 16 July, Pafos sold Belgium midfielder to KAS Eupen for an undisclosed fee, and new club-record fee.

On 31 July, Angolan forward, Vá joined Pafos from Petro de Luanda.

In August, Pafos signed Nahir Besara from Al-Fayha, Paulus Arajuuri from Brøndby, and the season-long loan signing of Reinis Reinholds from Pisa.

On 1 September Cy Goddard joined on a season-long loan deal from Benevento, with Kevin Lafrance joining the next day from APOEL on a similar deal.

On 5 September Gerasimos Fylaktou returned to Pafos from Ermis Aradippou, having previously played for the club on loan during the 2017–18 season.

On 6 September, Pafos signed former Crystal Palace winger Bakary Sako and former Huddersfield Town midfielder Danny Williams on free-transfers, with Jerson Cabral joining the following day on a free-transfer having last played for Levski Sofia.

On 6 November, Željko Kopić left his role as head coach of Pafos, with sporting director Jeremy Steele being placed in temporary charge. On 13 December, Cameron Toshack was announced as Pafos' new permanent head coach.

In January, Lulinha left Pafos after his contract was terminated by mutual agreement, whilst Deniss Rakels and Zdeněk Folprecht returned to the club following loan stints away during the first half of the season.

On 24 January, Brayan Angulo signed permanently for Pafos from Independiente Medellín having previously played for the club during the 2018–19 season.

On 30 January, Pafos signed Onni Valakari from Tromsø for an undisclosed fee.

On 15 May, the Cyta Championship was abandoned due to COVID-19 pandemic.

== Transfers ==
=== In ===
Date	Position	Nationality	Name	From	Fee	Ref.
1 July 2019	GK	(Ukraine)	Artur Rudko	Dynamo Kyiv	Undisclosed	
1 July 2019	DF	(France)	Mickaël Panos	Saint-Étienne	Undisclosed	
1 July 2019	DF	(Greece)	Giorgos Valerianos	Aris Thessaloniki	Undisclosed	
6 July 2019	MF	(Nigeria)	Sunny	Unattached	Free	
10 July 2019	FW	(Cyprus)	Alex Konstantinou	Olympiakos Nicosia	Undisclosed	
31 July 2019	FW	(Angola)	Vá	Petro de Luanda	Undisclosed	
20 August 2019	MF	(Sweden)	Nahir Besara	Al-Fayha	Undisclosed	
20 August 2019	DF	(Finland)	Paulus Arajuuri	Brøndby	Undisclosed	
5 September 2019	MF	(Cyprus)	Gerasimos Fylaktou	Ermis Aradippou	Undisclosed	
6 September 2019	MF	(Mali)	Bakary Sako	Unattached	Free	
6 September 2019	MF	(United States)	Danny Williams	Unattached	Free	
7 September 2019	MF	(Cape Verde)	Jerson Cabral	Unattached	Free	
24 January 2020	MF	(Colombia)	Brayan Angulo	Independiente Medellín	Undisclosed	
30 January 2020	MF	(Finland)	Onni Valakari	Tromsø	Undisclosed	

=== Loans in ===
Start date	Position	Nationality	Name	From	End date	Ref.
23 August 2019	GK	(Latvia)	Reinis Reinholds	Pisa	End of Season	
1 September 2019	MF	(Japan)	Cy Goddard	Benevento	End of Season	
4 September 2019	DF	(Uruguay)	Joaquín Varela	Fénix	End of Season	

=== Out ===
Date	Position	Nationality	Name	To	Fee	Ref.
3 July 2019	DF	(Brazil)	Jander	Red Star Belgrade	Undisclosed	
16 July 2019	MF	(Belgium)	Jens Cools	KAS Eupen	Undisclosed	

=== Loans out ===
Start date	Position	Nationality	Name	To	End date	Ref.
1 July 2019	FW	(Latvia)	Deniss Rakels	Riga	31 December 2019	
8 September 2019	MF	(Czech Republic)	Zdeněk Folprecht	Fastav Zlín	31 December 2019	
6 March 2020	MF	(Colombia)	Brayan Angulo	Riga	End of Season	

=== Released ===
Date	Position	Nationality	Name	Joined	Date	Ref
11 July 2019	FW	(Cyprus)	Panagiotis Zachariou	Olympiakos Nicosia	11 July 2019	
10 January 2020	MF	(Brazil)	Lulinha	Júbilo Iwata	10 January 2020	
27 January 2020	FW	(Argentina)	Federico Rasic	Sona Calcio	5 February 2021	
19 May 2020	MF	(United States)	Danny Williams	Retired		
30 June 2020	DF	(Cyprus)	Andreas Panayiotou	Apollon Limassol		
30 June 2020	DF	(Cyprus)	Andreas Tsokkas	Akritas Chlorakas	7 July 2020	
30 June 2020	DF	(Slovenia)	Matija Širok	Gorica	25 September 2020	
30 June 2020	MF	(Czech Republic)	Zdeněk Folprecht	Příbram	22 September 2020	
30 June 2020	MF	(Mali)	Bakary Sako	Saint-Étienne	30 December 2021	
30 June 2020	MF	(Nigeria)	Sunny			
30 June 2020	FW	(Cyprus)	Alex Konstantinou	Karmiotissa	6 July 2020	
30 June 2020	FW	(Slovakia)	Adam Nemec	Dinamo București	29 August 2020	

== Squad ==
As of match played 9 March 2020

No.	Name	Nationality	Position	Date of birth (age)	Signed from	Signed in	Contract ends	Apps.	Goals
Goalkeepers
1	Artur Rudko	(Ukraine)	GK	7 May 1992 (aged 28)	Dynamo Kyiv	2019		23	0
12	Evgenios Petrou	(Cyprus)	GK	6 September 1997 (aged 22)	Ethnikos Assia	2018		8	0
52	Reinis Reinholds	(Latvia)	GK	26 September 1997 (aged 22)	loan from Pisa	2019	2020	0	0
88	Andreas Theokli	(Cyprus)	GK	23 July 2001 (aged 18)	Academy	2019		0	0
Defenders
3	Joaquín Varela	(Uruguay)	DF	27 June 1998 (aged 21)	loan from Fénix	2019	2020	0	0
5	Kyriakos Antoniou	(Cyprus)	DF	3 May 2001 (aged 19)	Academy	2018		17	1
8	Matija Širok	(Slovenia)	DF	31 May 1991 (aged 28)	Domžale	2018		56	1
13	Kevin Lafrance	(Haiti)	DF	13 January 1990 (aged 30)	loan from APOEL	2019	2020	17	1
15	Giorgos Valerianos	(Greece)	DF	13 February 1992 (aged 28)	Aris Thessaloniki	2019		15	0
18	Mickaël Panos	(France)	DF	10 February 1997 (aged 23)	Saint-Étienne	2019		23	0
20	Andreas Tsokkas	(Cyprus)	DF	25 July 2000 (aged 19)	Academy	2019		0	0
22	Andreas Panayiotou	(Cyprus)	DF	3 May 2001 (aged 19)	Omonia	2018		42	2
23	Paulus Arajuuri (Captain)	(Finland)	DF	15 June 1988 (aged 31)	Brøndby	2019		20	2
66	Pavel Lelyukhin	(Russia)	DF	23 April 1998 (aged 22)	Dynamo Moscow	2018		24	0
Midfielders
6	Sunny	(Nigeria)	MF	17 September 1988 (aged 31)	Real Salt Lake	2019		5	0
7	Danny Williams	(United States)	MF	8 March 1989 (aged 31)	Huddersfield Town	2019		11	0
14	Gerasimos Fylaktou	(Cyprus)	MF	24 July 1991 (aged 28)	Ermis Aradippou	2019			
16	Abdisalam Ibrahim	(Norway)	MF	1 May 1991 (aged 29)	Vålerenga	2019		11	0
17	Nahir Besara	(Sweden)	MF	25 February 1991 (aged 29)	Al-Fayha	2019		24	1
21	Cy Goddard	(Japan)	MF	2 April 1997 (aged 23)	loan from Benevento	2019	2020	8	0
24	Onni Valakari	(Finland)	MF	18 August 1999 (aged 20)	Tromsø	2020		6	5
26	Bakary Sako	(Mali)	MF	26 April 1988 (aged 32)	Crystal Palace	2019		6	1
31	Zdeněk Folprecht	(Czech Republic)	MF	7 January 1991 (aged 29)	Slovan Liberec	2018		44	1
42	Jason Puncheon	(England)	MF	18 June 1986 (aged 33)	Crystal Palace	2019	2021	16	0
Forwards
9	Kévin Bérigaud (Vice-captain)	(France)	FW	9 May 1988 (aged 32)	Montpellier	2018			
11	Alex Konstantinou	(Cyprus)	FW	11 April 1992 (aged 28)	Olympiakos Nicosia	2019		9	1
28	Vá	(Angola)	FW	24 April 1998 (aged 22)	Petro de Luanda	2019		18	2
32	Marcelo Torres	(Argentina)	FW	6 November 1997 (aged 22)	loan from Boca Juniors	2019	2020	6	2
77	Adam Nemec	(Slovakia)	FW	2 September 1985 (aged 34)	Dinamo București	2018		48	22
87	Nikita Dubov	(England)	FW	15 August 2000 (aged 19)	Academy	2019		0	0
91	Jerson Cabral	(Cape Verde)	FW	3 January 1991 (aged 29)	Levski Sofia	2019		14	3
92	Deniss Rakels	(Latvia)	FW	20 August 1992 (aged 27)	Reading	2018		30	2
Out on loan
70	Brayan Angulo	(Colombia)	MF	19 July 1993 (aged 26)	América de Cali	2020		36	10
Left during the season
10	Lulinha	(Brazil)	MF	10 April 1990 (aged 30)	Sharjah	2018		29	2
19	Federico Rasic	(Argentina)	FW	24 March 1992 (aged 28)	Arsenal Tula	2018		36	9

=== Out on loan ===
Note: Flags indicate national team as defined under FIFA eligibility rules; some limited exceptions apply. Players may hold more than one non-FIFA nationality.

No.	Pos.	Nation	Player
70	MF	COL	Brayan Angulo (at Riga)

=== Left club during season ===
Note: Flags indicate national team as defined under FIFA eligibility rules; some limited exceptions apply. Players may hold more than one non-FIFA nationality.

No. / Pos. / Nation / Player; 10 / MF / BRA / Lulinha (to Júbilo Iwata)	No. / Pos. / Nation / Player; 19 / FW / ARG / Federico Rasic

== Friendlies ==
11 October 2019	Pafos	–	Riga	Geroskipou
18:00 EEST (UTC+3)				Stadium: Geroskipou Municipality Stadium

== Competitions ==
=== Overview ===
Competition	First match	Last match	Starting round	Final position	Record							
Competition	First match	Last match	Starting round	Final position	Pld	W	D	L	GF	GA	GD	Win %
Cyta Championship	23 August 2019	9 March 2020	Matchday 1	7th	23	8	6	9	26	28	−2	34.78
Cypriot Cup	27 November 2019	29 January 2020	First round	Second Round	2	0	0	2	1	3	−2	0.00
Total					25	8	6	11	27	31	−4	32.00

Last updated: 9 March 2020
Source: Competitions

=== Cyta Championship ===
==== Regular season ====
===== League table =====
Pos	Team	Pld	W	D	L	GF	GA	GD	Pts	Qualification or relegation
5	AEK Larnaca	22	9	8	5	36	26	+10	35	Qualification for the Championship round
6	AEL Limassol	22	8	7	7	27	26	+1	31	Qualification for the Championship round
7	Pafos FC	22	8	6	8	26	26	0	30	Qualification for the Relegation round
8	Nea Salamis Famagusta	22	7	4	11	25	36	−11	25	Qualification for the Relegation round
9	Olympiakos Nicosia	22	5	9	8	27	34	−7	24	Qualification for the Relegation round

Source: Cyprus Football Association, Soccerway
Rules for classification: 1) Points; 2) Head-to-head points; 3) Head-to-head goal difference; 4) Head-to-head goals scored; 5) Head-to-head away goals scored (only if two teams); 6) Goal difference; 7) Goals scored; 8) Play-off (only if deciding championship round, relegation round or relegation).

===== Results summary =====
Overall								Home						Away					
Pld	W	D	L	GF	GA	GD	Pts	W	D	L	GF	GA	GD	W	D	L	GF	GA	GD
22	8	6	8	26	26	0	30	5	3	3	13	12	+1	3	3	5	13	14	−1

Last updated: 29 February 2020.
Source: Results

===== Results by results =====
Matchday	1	2	3	4	5	6	7	8	9	10	11	12	13	14	15	16	17	18	19	20	21	22
Ground	A	H	A	A	H	A	H	A	H	A	H	H	A	H	A	H	A	H	H	A	H	A
Result	W	L	L	L	W	D	D	L	D	L	L	W	L	L	D	D	W	W	W	D	W	W
Position	3	5	7	8	7	9	8	9	9	9	10	9	10	10	10	10	10	9	8	7	7	7

Updated to match(es) played on 29 February 2020. Source: Results
A = Away; H = Home; W = Win; D = Draw; L = Loss; P = Postponed

===== Results =====
23 August 2019 1	Nea Salamis Famagusta	1–2	Pafos	Larnaca
19:00 EEST (UTC+3)	Noor (yellow card) 81'; Onuegbu 85'	Report	Bérigaud (yellow card) 17' (goal) 44'; Nemec 90'	Stadium: Ammochostos Stadium; Referee: Kyriakos Christodoulou

30 August 2019 2	Pafos	0–2	AEK Larnaca	Paphos
19:00 EEST (UTC+3)	Panayiotou (yellow card) 55'; Širok (yellow card) 57' (yellow-red card) 60'	Report	Cases (yellow card) 45'; Trichkovski 60' (pen.), 90+3' (pen.)	Stadium: Stelios Kyriakides Stadium; Referee: Timotheos Christofi

14 September 2019 3	Apollon Limassol	3–2	Pafos	Limassol
20:00 EEST (UTC+3)	Papoulis (yellow card) 12'; Zelaya 18', 82'; Gianniotas 66' (yellow card) 71'; Pittas (yellow card) 86'	Report	Torres 14', 61' (yellow card) 37'; Panos (yellow card) 45+1'; Besara (yellow card) 65'	Stadium: Tsirio Stadium; Referee: Nikolas Neokleous

22 September 2019 4	Anorthosis Famagusta	2–0	Pafos	Larnaca
18:00 EEST (UTC+3)	Schildenfeld 32'; Rayo 47'; Selin (yellow card) 71'; Manthatis (yellow card) 86'	Report	Rasic (yellow card) 22'; Panos (yellow card) 27'; Panayiotou (yellow card) 80'	Stadium: Antonis Papadopoulos Stadium; Referee: Kyriakos Christodoulou

5 October 2019 5	Pafos	2–1	Omonoia Nicosia	Paphos
18:00 EEST (UTC+3)	Lafrance (yellow card) 45' (goal) 88'; Valerianos (yellow card) 45+1'; Besara 69'; Nemec (yellow card) 80'	Report	Derbyshire 64' (yellow card) 74'; Miku (yellow card) 72'	Stadium: Stelios Kyriakides Stadium; Referee: Leontios Trattos

20 October 2019 6	Olympiakos Nicosia	1–1	Pafos	Nicosia
19:00 EET (UTC+2)	Vinícius (yellow card) 57'; Acosta (yellow card) 60'; Kah 76'; Soteriou (yellow card) 90+3'	Report	Antoniou (yellow card) 33'; Puncheon (yellow card) 88'; Nemec (yellow card) 90+3'; Lulinha 90+4'	Stadium: Makario Stadium; Referee: Nikolas Neokleous

26 October 2019 7	Pafos	1–1	Ethnikos Achna	Paphos
18:00 EET (UTC+2)	Panos (yellow card) 47'; Valerianos (yellow card) 72' (yellow-red card) 88'; Rasic 80'; Nemec (yellow card) 90+2'	Report	Khudobyak 55' (pen.); Kostovski (yellow card) 60'; Glombard (yellow card) 65'; Markoski (yellow card) 72'; Kyprianou (yellow card) 87'; Bogatinov (yellow card) 90+2'	Stadium: Stelios Kyriakides Stadium; Referee: Chrysovalantis Theouli

4 November 2019 8	AEL Limassol	2–0	Pafos	Limassol
19:00 EET (UTC+2)	Avraam (yellow card) 17'; Aganović 56'; Torres 83'; Rašo (yellow card) 90+1'	Report	Lelyukhin (yellow card) 24'; Lafrance (yellow card) 31'; Puncheon (yellow card) 62'; Lulinha (yellow card) 63'	Stadium: Tsirio Stadium; Referee: Kyriakos Christodoulou

10 November 2019 9	Pafos	1–1	Enosis Neon Paralimni	Paphos
17:00 EET (UTC+2)	Sako 32'; Puncheon (yellow card) 39'; Širok (yellow card) 60'	Report	Moulazimis (yellow card) 14' (yellow-red card) 74'; Riera (yellow card) 60'; Theodorou 90+2'	Stadium: Stelios Kyriakides Stadium; Referee: Vasilis Demetriou

23 November 2019 10	APOEL	3–0	Pafos	Strovolos
18:00 EET (UTC+2)	Hallenius 9'; Souza (yellow card) 19'; Al-Taamari 39'; Ioannou (yellow card) 54'; Savić 58'; Vidigal (yellow card) 84'	Report	Arajuuri (yellow card) 47'; Williams (yellow card) 76'	Stadium: GSP Stadium; Referee: Giorgos Nikolaou

1 December 2019 11	Pafos	0–1	Doxa Katokopias	Paphos
17:00 EET (UTC+2)	Puncheon (yellow card) 24'; Valerianos (yellow card) 27'; Fylaktou (yellow card) 44'	Report	Papafotis (yellow card) 33'; Dervite 89'	Stadium: Stelios Kyriakides Stadium; Referee: Vasilis Demetriou

6 December 2019 12	Pafos	1–0	Nea Salamis Famagusta	Paphos
19:00 EET (UTC+2)	Širok (yellow card) 32'; Arajuuri 58'; Panayiotou (yellow card) 66'; Vá (yellow card) 71'; Puncheon (yellow card) 86'; Nemec (yellow card) 90+2'	Report	Tisdell (yellow card) 45+1'; Christoforou (yellow card) 56' (yellow-red card) 59'	Stadium: Stelios Kyriakides Stadium; Referee: Loukas Soteriou

14 December 2019 13	AEK Larnaca	1–0	Pafos	Larnaca
17:00 EET (UTC+2)	Truyols 29'; González (yellow card) 72'; Ruiz (yellow card) 83'; Tete (yellow card) 87'	Report	Valerianos (yellow card) 32'; Antoniou (yellow card) 50'; Arajuuri (yellow card) 59'; Rudko (red card) 79'	Stadium: AEK Arena; Referee: Kyriakos Christodoulou

6 January 2020 15	Pafos	0–3	Anorthosis Famagusta	Paphos
19:00 EET (UTC+2)	Panos (yellow card) 23'; Antoniou (yellow card) 51'	Report	Schildenfeld 2'; Rayo 29' (pen.), 59' (pen.)	Stadium: Stelios Kyriakides Stadium; Referee: Vasilis Demetriou

10 January 2020 16	Omonoia Nicosia	0–0	Pafos	Strovolos
19:00 EET (UTC+2)	Derbyshire (yellow card) 84'	Report	Panos (yellow card) 33'; Arajuuri (yellow card) 60'; Cabral (yellow card) 76'; Folprecht (yellow card) 78'; Rudko (yellow card) 82'	Stadium: GSP Stadium; Referee: Kyriakos Christodoulou

25 January 2020 17	Pafos	1–1	Olympiakos Nicosia	Paphos
15:00 EET (UTC+2)	Vá (yellow card) 59'; Rakels (yellow card) 60'; Cabral 67'	Report	Besara 56' (o.g.); Soteriou (yellow card) 67'; Sambinha (yellow card) 80'	Stadium: Stelios Kyriakides Stadium; Referee: Giorgos Nikolaou

1 February 2020 18	Ethnikos Achna	0–3	Pafos	Achna
17:00 EET (UTC+2)	Babić (yellow card) 61'; Laban (yellow card) 90+1'	Report	Arajuuri (yellow card) 23'; Valakari 32', 73'; Širok (yellow card) 40'; Panayiotou (yellow card) 80' (goal) 83'	Stadium: Dasaki Stadium; Referee: Chrysovalantis Theouli

9 February 2020 19	Pafos	2–0	AEL Limassol	Paphos
18:00 EET (UTC+2)	Rakels 44'; Vá 75'	Report		Stadium: Stelios Kyriakides Stadium; Referee: Kyriakos Christodoulou

12 February 2020 14	Pafos	3–2	Apollon Limassol	Paphos
17:00 EET (UTC+2)	Vá 29'; Lafrance (yellow card) 36'; Cabral 45+2' (yellow card) 57'; Antoniou 74'	Report	Papoulis 15'; Pittas 45+1'; Antoniades (yellow card) 41'; Sachetti (yellow card) 58'; Sardinero (yellow card) 64'; Szalai (yellow card) 73'; Gianniotas (red card) 88'; João Pedro (yellow card) 88'	Stadium: Stelios Kyriakides Stadium; Referee: Giorgos Nikolaou

15 February 2020 20	Enosis Neon Paralimni	1–1	Pafos	Paralimni
19:00 EET (UTC+2)	Varela (yellow card) 11'; Theodorou 20'	Report	Bérigaud 21'; Antoniou (yellow card) 40'; Arajuuri (yellow card) 67'	Stadium: Paralimni Stadium; Referee: Nikolas Neokleous

23 February 2020 21	Pafos	2–0	APOEL	Paphos
16:00 EET (UTC+2)	Širok (yellow card) 50'; Valakari 57' (pen.), 68'; Lafrance (yellow card) 61'; Panos (yellow card) 63'; Vá (yellow card) 78'	Report	Vouros (yellow card) 21'; Pavlović (yellow card) 83'; Mihajlović (yellow card) 90'	Stadium: Stelios Kyriakides Stadium; Referee: Loukas Soteriou

29 February 2020 22	Doxa Katokopias	0–4	Pafos	Nicosia
17:00 EET (UTC+2)	Mintikkis (yellow card) 26'; Dervite (yellow card) 70'; Mesca (yellow card) 75'	Report	Arajuuri 27'; Valakari (yellow card) 32' (goal) 66'; Panayiotou (yellow card) 58'; Cabral 62'; Dervite 76'	Stadium: Makario Stadium; Referee: Kyriakos Christodoulou

==== Relegation round ====
===== League table =====
Pos	Team	Pld	W	D	L	GF	GA	GD	Pts
7	Pafos FC	23	8	6	9	26	28	−2	30
8	Nea Salamis Famagusta	23	7	5	11	27	38	−11	26
9	Olympiakos Nicosia	23	5	10	8	28	35	−7	25
10	Enosis Neon Paralimni	23	5	8	10	29	43	−14	23
11	Ethnikos Achna	23	5	6	12	31	46	−15	21
12	Doxa Katokopias	23	3	5	15	15	45	−30	14

Rules for classification: 1) Points; 2) Head-to-head points; 3) Head-to-head goal difference; 4) Head-to-head goals scored; 5) Head-to-head away goals scored (only if two teams); 6) Goal difference; 7) Goals scored; 8) Play-off (only if deciding champion or UEFA competitions).

===== Results summary =====
Overall								Home						Away					
Pld	W	D	L	GF	GA	GD	Pts	W	D	L	GF	GA	GD	W	D	L	GF	GA	GD
1	0	0	1	0	2	−2	0	0	0	0	0	0	0	0	0	1	0	2	−2

Last updated: 9 March 2020.
Source: Results

===== Results by results =====
Matchday	1
Ground	A
Result	L
Position	7

Updated to match(es) played on 9 March 2020. Source: Results
A = Away; H = Home; W = Win; D = Draw; L = Loss; P = Postponed

===== Results =====
9 March 2020 23	Doxa Katokopias	2–0	Pafos	Nicosia
19:00 EET (UTC+2)	Benjamín (yellow card) 39'; Jutrić 48'; Papafotis 73'; Trajchevski (yellow card) 80'	Report	Besara (yellow card) 80'	Stadium: Makario Stadium; Referee: Loukas Soteriou

=== Cypriot Cup ===
27 November 2019 First Round	Ayia Napa	0–3	Pafos	Paralimni
14:30 EET (UTC+2)		Report	Nemec 52', 66' (pen.); Konstantinou 77'	Stadium: Tasos Markou Stadium; Referee: Konstantinou Andreas

15 January 2020 Second Round 1st leg	Pafos	0–1	Nea Salamis Famagusta	Pafos
16:00 EET (UTC+2)	Valerianos (yellow card) 35'	Report	Eloundou 21' (yellow card) 54'	Stadium: Stelios Kyriakides Stadium; Attendance: 350; Referee: Chrysovalantis Theouli

29 January 2020 Second Round 2nd leg	Nea Salamis Famagusta	2–1 (3–1 agg.)	Pafos	Larnaca
16:30 EET (UTC+2)	Maurício 28' (pen.); Marjanović (yellow card) 75'; Correia (yellow card) 78' (goal) 90+4'; Eloundou (yellow card) 90+3'	Report	Širok 17'; Arajuuri (yellow card) 26'; Vá (yellow card) 56'	Stadium: Ammochostos Stadium; Referee: Nikolas Neokleous

== Squad statistics ==
As of match played 9 March 2020

=== Appearances and goals ===
No.	Pos	Nat	Player	Total		Cyta Championship		Cypriot Cup	
No.	Pos	Nat	Player	Apps	Goals	Apps	Goals	Apps	Goals
1	GK	(Ukraine) UKR	Artur Rudko	23	0	21	0	2	0
5	DF	(Cyprus) CYP	Kyriacos Antoniou	14	1	10+2	1	2	0
6	MF	(Nigeria) NGR	Sunny	5	0	2+3	0	0	0
7	MF	(United States) USA	Danny Williams	11	0	9+2	0	0	0
8	DF	(Slovenia) SLO	Matija Širok	23	1	20	0	3	1
9	FW	(France) FRA	Kévin Bérigaud	7	2	6+1	2	0	0
11	FW	(Cyprus) CYP	Alex Konstantinou	9	1	0+7	0	0+2	1
12	GK	(Cyprus) CYP	Evgenios Petrou	4	0	2+1	0	1	0
13	DF	(Haiti) HAI	Kevin Lafrance	17	1	15+1	1	1	0
14	MF	(Cyprus) CYP	Gerasimos Fylaktou	5	0	2+2	0	0+1	0
15	DF	(Greece) GRE	Giorgos Valerianos	15	0	13	0	2	0
16	MF	(Norway) NOR	Abdisalam Ibrahim	2	0	2	0	0	0
17	MF	(Sweden) SWE	Nahir Besara	24	1	20+2	1	2	0
18	DF	(France) FRA	Mickaël Panos	23	0	18+2	0	3	0
21	MF	(Japan) JPN	Cy Goddard	8	0	2+4	0	0+2	0
22	DF	(Cyprus) CYP	Andreas Panayiotou	19	1	13+4	1	2	0
23	DF	(Finland) FIN	Paulus Arajuuri	20	2	17	2	3	0
24	MF	(Finland) FIN	Onni Valakari	6	5	6	5	0	0
26	MF	(Mali) MLI	Bakary Sako	6	1	6	1	0	0
28	FW	(Angola) ANG	Vá	18	2	13+3	2	2	0
31	MF	(Czech Republic) CZE	Zdeněk Folprecht	10	0	7+1	0	2	0
32	FW	(Argentina) ARG	Marcelo Torres	6	2	2+3	2	1	0
42	MF	(England) ENG	Jason Puncheon	16	0	15+1	0	0	0
66	DF	(Russia) RUS	Pavel Lelyukhin	13	0	4+6	0	3	0
77	FW	(Slovakia) SVK	Adam Nemec	15	3	12+2	1	1	2
91	FW	(Cape Verde) CPV	Jerson Cabral	14	3	8+3	3	2+1	0
92	FW	(Latvia) LAT	Deniss Rakels	9	1	4+4	1	1	0
Players away on loan:
70	MF	(Colombia) COL	Brayan Angulo	2	0	1+1	0	0	0
Players who appeared for Pafos but left during the season:
10	MF	(Brazil) BRA	Lulinha	7	1	1+6	1	0	0
19	FW	(Argentina) ARG	Federico Rasic	4	1	2+2	1	0	0

=== Goal scorers ===
Place	Position	Nation	Number	Name	Cyta Championship	Cypriot Cup	Total
1	MF	(Finland)	24	Onni Valakari	5	0	5
2	FW	(Cape Verde)	91	Jerson Cabral	3	0	3
2	FW	(Slovakia)	77	Adam Nemec	1	2	3
3	DF	(Finland)	23	Paulus Arajuuri	2	0	2
3	FW	(Angola)	28	Vá	2	0	2
3	FW	(France)	9	Kévin Bérigaud	2	0	2
3	FW	(Argentina)	32	Marcelo Torres	2	0	2
8	MF	(Sweden)	17	Nahir Besara	1	0	1
8	DF	(Haiti)	13	Kevin Lafrance	1	0	1
8	DF	(Cyprus)	5	Kyriacos Antoniou	1	0	1
8	DF	(Cyprus)	22	Andreas Panayiotou	1	0	1
8	FW	(Latvia)	92	Deniss Rakels	1	0	1
8	MF	(Brazil)	10	Lulinha	1	0	1
8	MF	(Mali)	26	Bakary Sako	1	0	1
8	FW	(Argentina)	19	Federico Rasic	1	0	1
8	FW	(Cyprus)	11	Alex Konstantinou	0	1	1
8	DF	(Slovenia)	8	Matija Širok	0	1	1
Total					26	4	30

=== Clean sheets ===
Place	Position	Nation	Number	Name	Cyta Championship	Cypriot Cup	Total
1	GK	(Ukraine)	1	Artur Rudko	6	0	6
TOTALS					6	0	6

=== Disciplinary record ===
Number	Nation	Position	Name	Cyta Championship		Cypriot Cup		Total	
Number	Nation	Position	Name	Yellow card	Red card	Yellow card	Red card	Yellow card	Red card
1	(Ukraine)	GK	Artur Rudko	1	1	0	0	1	1
5	(Cyprus)	DF	Kyriacos Antoniou	4	0	0	0	4	0
7	(United States)	MF	Danny Williams	1	0	0	0	1	0
8	(Slovenia)	DF	Matija Širok	6	1	0	0	6	1
9	(France)	FW	Kévin Bérigaud	1	0	0	0	1	0
13	(Haiti)	DF	Kevin Lafrance	4	0	0	0	4	0
14	(Cyprus)	MF	Gerasimos Fylaktou	1	0	0	0	1	0
15	(Greece)	DF	Giorgos Valerianos	5	1	1	0	6	1
17	(Sweden)	MF	Nahir Besara	2	0	0	0	2	0
18	(France)	DF	Mickaël Panos	6	0	0	0	6	0
22	(Cyprus)	DF	Andreas Panayiotou	5	0	0	0	5	0
23	(Finland)	DF	Paulus Arajuuri	5	0	1	0	6	0
24	(Finland)	MF	Onni Valakari	1	0	0	0	1	0
28	(Angola)	FW	Vá	3	0	1	0	4	0
31	(Czech Republic)	MF	Zdeněk Folprecht	1	0	0	0	1	0
32	(Argentina)	FW	Marcelo Torres	1	0	0	0	1	0
42	(England)	MF	Jason Puncheon	5	0	0	0	5	0
66	(Russia)	DF	Pavel Lelyukhin	1	0	0	0	1	0
77	(Slovakia)	FW	Adam Nemec	4	0	0	0	4	0
91	(Cape Verde)	FW	Jerson Cabral	2	0	0	0	2	0
92	(Latvia)	FW	Deniss Rakels	1	0	0	0	1	0
Players away on loan:
Players who left Pafos during the season:
10	(Brazil)	MF	Lulinha	1	0	0	0	1	0
19	(Argentina)	FW	Federico Rasic	1	0	0	0	1	0
Total				62	3	3	0	65	3
