= 2022–23 Apollon Limassol FC season =

Apollon Limassol
2022–23 season
- Manager: Alexander Zorniger (until 10 August 2022); David Català (from 12 August 2022 to 9 November 2022); Constantinos Makrides (from 10 November 2022 to 9 February 2023); Bogdan Andone (from 11 February 2023)
- Stadium: Tsirio Stadium (Old stadium); GSP Stadium (Note: Apollon Limassol played their home matches in European competitions at GSP Stadium in Nicosia, instead of their regular stadium, Tsirio Stadium in Limassol, which did not meet UEFA requirements.) (Temporary stadium); Alphamega Stadium (New stadium)
- Cypriot First Division: 5th
- Cypriot Cup: Second round
- Cypriot Super Cup: Winners
- UEFA Champions League: Third qualifying round
- UEFA Europa League: Play-off round
- UEFA Europa Conference League: Group stage
- Top goalscorer: League: Ioannis Pittas (18)
- Biggest win: 3–0 v Anorthosis Famagusta (Home, 15 January 2023, Cypriot First Division)
- Biggest defeat: 0–4 v Maccabi Haifa (Away, 3 August 2022, UEFA Champions League)
Home colours	Away colours

The 2022–23 season was Apollon Limassol's 65th consecutive season in the Cypriot First Division. In addition to the domestic league, the club participated in the Cypriot Cup, the Cypriot Super Cup, the UEFA Champions League, the UEFA Europa League and the UEFA Europa Conference League.

== Squad ==
Squad at end of season

Note: Flags indicate national team as defined under FIFA eligibility rules; some limited exceptions apply. Players may hold more than one non-FIFA nationality.

No.	Pos.	Nation	Player
2	DF	NGA	Godswill Ekpolo
4	DF	SRB	Vukašin Jovanović
5	DF	FRA	Mathieu Peybernes
6	DF	CYP	Panagiotis Artymatas
8	MF	MTN	El Hadji Ba
9	FW	CYP	Ioannis Pittas
11	FW	FRA	Bagaliy Dabo
17	MF	BUL	Ilian Iliev
18	MF	NOR	Etzaz Hussain
20	MF	CYP	Danilo Špoljarić
22	DF	CYP	Valentin Roberge
23	MF	ANG	Vá
24	DF	MAR	Amine Khammas
25	MF	CYP	Charalampos Kyriakou
26	GK	SRB	Aleksandar Jovanović

No.	Pos.	Nation	Player
27	MF	CYP	Giorgos Pontikou
28	FW	FRA	Nicolas Diguiny
29	DF	NOR	Haitam Aleesami
30	DF	CYP	Andreas Panagiotou Filiotis
31	FW	GHA	Godsway Donyoh
35	DF	GRE	Charalampos Mavrias
36	MF	ISR	Ido Shahar
65	MF	NED	Patrick Joosten
71	GK	ANG	Carlos Peixoto
74	MF	EGY	Amr Warda
77	MF	ARG	Israel Coll
78	GK	CYP	Giorgos Loizou
90	FW	NGA	Ezekiel Henty
93	MF	LBN	Bassel Jradi
99	GK	CYP	Dimitris Dimitriou

== Competitions ==
=== Overview ===
Competition	First match	Last match	Starting round	Final position	Record							
Competition	First match	Last match	Starting round	Final position	Pld	W	D	L	GF	GA	GD	Win %
Cypriot First Division	30 August 2022	28 May 2023	Matchday 1	5th	35	19	5	11	47	37	+10	54.29
Cypriot Cup	11 January 2023	11 January 2023	Second round	Second round	1	0	1	0	0	0	+0	0.00
Cypriot Super Cup	12 August 2022		Final	Winners	1	1	0	0	2	0	+2	100.00
UEFA Champions League	3 August 2022	9 August 2022	Third qualifying round	Third qualifying round	2	1	0	1	2	4	−2	50.00
UEFA Europa League	18 August 2022	25 August 2022	Play-off round	Play-off round	2	0	2	0	2	2	+0	0.00
UEFA Europa Conference League	8 September 2022	3 November 2022	Group stage	Group stage	6	2	1	3	5	7	−2	33.33
Total					47	23	9	15	58	50	+8	48.94

Source: Competitions

=== Cypriot First Division ===
==== Regular season ====
===== League table =====
Pos	Team	Pld	W	D	L	GF	GA	GD	Pts	Qualification or relegation
3	Aris Limassol	26	15	8	3	46	20	+26	53	Qualification for the Championship round
4	Pafos	26	14	8	4	48	20	+28	50	Qualification for the Championship round
5	Apollon Limassol	25	13	5	7	34	27	+7	44	Qualification for the Championship round
6	Omonia	26	13	2	11	37	28	+9	41	Qualification for the Championship round
7	Nea Salamis Famagusta	26	12	2	12	27	34	−7	38	Qualification for the Relegation round

Source: Cyprus Football Association
Rules for classification: 1) Points; 2) Head-to-head points; 3) Head-to-head goal difference; 4) Head-to-head goals scored; 5) Head-to-head away goals scored (only if two teams); 6) Goal difference; 7) Goals scored; 8) Play-off (only if deciding championship round, relegation round or relegation).

===== Results summary =====
Overall								Home						Away					
Pld	W	D	L	GF	GA	GD	Pts	W	D	L	GF	GA	GD	W	D	L	GF	GA	GD
25	13	5	7	34	27	+7	44	8	1	3	19	12	+7	5	4	4	15	15	0

Source: Worldfootball

===== Results by round =====
Round	1	2	3	4	5	6	7	8	9	10	11	12	13	14	15	16	17	18	19	20	21	22	23	24	25	26
Ground	H	A	H	A	H	A	H	A	H	A	H	A	H	A	H	A	H	A	H	A	H	A	H	A	H	A
Result	W	W	W	D	D	W	L	D	L	D	W	L	V	W	W	L	W	D	W	L	W	L	L	W	W	W
Position	4	3	2	2	3	2	3	4	5	5	5	5	6	6	5	6	6	6	6	6	6	7	7	6	5	5
Points	3	6	9	10	11	14	14	15	15	16	19	19	19	22	25	25	28	29	32	32	35	35	35	38	41	44

Source: Worldfootball
A = Away; H = Home; W = Win; D = Draw; L = Loss; V = Void

===== Matches =====
30 August 2022 1	Apollon Limassol	1–0	Enosis Neon Paralimni	Limassol
19:00 EEST (UTC+3)	Henty 23'; Cabral (yellow card) 90+1'; Aleesami (yellow card) 90+4'	Report	Rousias (yellow card) 2'; Christofi (yellow card) 66'; Kotsonis (yellow card) 85'	Stadium: Tsirio Stadium; Referee: A. Argyrou

3 September 2022 2	Doxa Katokopias	0–1	Apollon Limassol	Nicosia
19:00 EEST (UTC+3)	Benny (yellow card) 40'; Kovacevic (yellow card) 73'; Trajchevski (yellow card) 85'; Anaane (yellow card) 90+3'	Report	Filiotis (yellow card) 30'; Joosten (yellow card) 75'; Roberge 77', (yellow card) 90+4'	Stadium: Makario Stadium; Referee: M. Christoforou

11 September 2022 3	Apollon Limassol	2–1	Omonia	Limassol
19:00 EEST (UTC+3)	V. Jovanović (yellow card) 13'; Pittas 63'; Khammas (yellow card) 77'; Jradi 83'	Report	Bruno 14' (pen.)	Stadium: Tsirio Stadium; Referee: P. Kolaric (Croatia)

18 September 2022 4	Nea Salamis Famagusta	1–1	Apollon Limassol	Larnaca
19:00 EEST (UTC+3)	Felipe 26'; Diakité (red card) 90+3'	Report	Pinakas 42' (pen.)	Stadium: Ammochostos Epistrofi Stadium; Referee: P. Konstantinos

1 October 2022 5	Apollon Limassol	1–1	Pafos	Limassol
19:00 EEST (UTC+3)	Vá (yellow card) 43', (goal) 67'; Coll (yellow card) 50'; Henty (yellow card) 75'	Report	Jairo 38'; Kvída (yellow card) 44'	Stadium: Tsirio Stadium; Referee: P. Fuertes (Spain)

10 October 2022 6	Anorthosis Famagusta	0–1	Apollon Limassol	Larnaca
19:00 EEST (UTC+3)		Report	Recio (yellow card) 23'; Joosten (yellow card) 61'; Pittas 69'; Khammas (yellow card) 90+5'	Stadium: Antonis Papadopoulos Stadium; Referee: L. Massimi (Italy)

17 October 2022 7	Apollon Limassol	0–3	Aris Limassol	Limassol
19:00 EEST (UTC+3)	Coll (yellow card) 43'; Recio (yellow card) 87'	Report	Babicka (yellow card) 60'; Kokorin 75', (yellow card) 76'; Djave 90', (yellow card) 90'; Stępiński 90+5' (pen.)	Stadium: Tsirio Stadium; Referee: C. Theouli

21 October 2022 8	Olympiakos Nicosia	1–1	Apollon Limassol	Nicosia
19:00 EEST (UTC+3)	Kartashyan (yellow card) 22'; Guerrier (yellow card) 49', (goal) 90+4' (pen.); Marković (yellow card) 51'; Salli (yellow card) 76'; Koroma (yellow card) 88'; Désiré (yellow card) 90+1'	Report	Cabral (yellow card) 31'; Recio (yellow card) 67'; Pittas 86'	Stadium: GSP Stadium; Referee: A. Argyrou

30 October 2022 9	Apollon Limassol	0–1	APOEL	Limassol
19:00 EET (UTC+2)		Report	Daushvili (yellow card) 12'; Marquinhos 90+18' (pen.)	Stadium: Tsirio Stadium; Referee: D. Doveri (Italy)

7 November 2022 10	Karmiotissa	1–1	Apollon Limassol	Larnaca
20:00 EET (UTC+2)	Zelaya 41' (pen.); Avraam (yellow card) 45'; Malone (yellow card) 62'; Kaltsas (yellow card) 90+3'	Report	A. Jovanović (yellow card) 40'; Coll (yellow card) 44'; Vá 68'; Roberge (yellow card) 90+3'; V. Jovanović (yellow card) 90+5'	Stadium: Ammochostos Stadium; Referee: K. Fellas

12 November 2022 11	Apollon Limassol	2–0	Akritas Chlorakas	Limassol
19:00 EET (UTC+2)	A. Jovanović (yellow card) 26'; Jradi 28' (pen.); Pittas 30'; Recio (red card) 37'; Iliev (yellow card) 90+1'	Report		Stadium: Tsirio Stadium; Referee: P. Chatzigeorgiou

26 November 2022 12	AEK Larnaca	1–0	Apollon Limassol	Larnaca
19:00 EET (UTC+2)	Pons 50'; Tomović (yellow card) 67'; Miličević (yellow card) 69'; Trichkovski (yellow card) 81'	Report	Mavrias (yellow card) 45+2'; Roberge (yellow card) 57'; V. Jovanović (yellow card) 90+4' (not on pitch)	Stadium: AEK Arena – Georgios Karapatakis; Referee: C. Theouli

4 December 2022 13	Apollon Limassol	–	AEL Limassol	Limassol
19:00 EET (UTC+2)		Report		Stadium: Tsirio Stadium; Referee: D. Doveri (Italy)
Note: The match was not played after being called off by the referee prior to kickoff due to serious crowd disturbances, including clashes between supporters and police and the throwing of flares and other objects, leading the Cyprus Football Association to later nullify the fixture without awarding points or ordering a replay.

10 December 2022 14	Enosis Neon Paralimni	0–1	Apollon Limassol	Paralimni
19:00 EET (UTC+2)	Ehmann (yellow card) 57'	Report	Pittas (yellow card) 35'; Diguiny 49'; Roberge (yellow card) 51'; V. Jovanović (yellow card) 54'	Stadium: Paralimni Stadium; Referee: D. Koumi

15 December 2022 15	Apollon Limassol	1–0	Doxa Katokopias	Limassol
19:00 EET (UTC+2)	Adénon 43' (o.g.)	Report	Karamanolis (yellow card) 59'	Stadium: Alphamega Stadium; Referee: A. Menelaos

22 December 2022 16	Omonia	2–0	Apollon Limassol	Nicosia
19:00 EET (UTC+2)	Bruno 3'; Kakoullis 78'	Report		Stadium: GSP Stadium; Referee: C. Theouli

2 January 2023 17	Apollon Limassol	2–0	Nea Salamis Famagusta	Limassol
19:00 EET (UTC+2)	Pittas (yellow card) 4'; Jradi (penalty missed) 16'; Khammas (yellow card) 73'; Shahar (yellow card) 90+1'; Diguiny 90+5'	Report	Ofori (yellow card) 14'	Stadium: Alphamega Stadium; Referee: K. Fellas

8 January 2023 18	Pafos	2–2	Apollon Limassol	Paphos
17:00 EET (UTC+2)	Jairo 4'; Juninho (yellow card) 20'; Name 72', (yellow card) 73'; Betancor (yellow card) 88'; Pelágio (yellow card) 88'	Report	Shahar 51' (pen.), (yellow card) 56'; Aleesami (yellow card) 72'; Roberge (yellow card) 73'; Peybernes (yellow card) 84' (yellow-red card) 90+9'; Pittas (yellow card) 90+1'; Khammas 90+9'	Stadium: Stelios Kyriakides Stadium; Referee: C. Theouli

15 January 2023 19	Apollon Limassol	3–0	Anorthosis Famagusta	Limassol
19:00 EET (UTC+2)	V. Jovanović (yellow card) 11'; Pittas 28'; Shahar (yellow card) 58'; Roberge (yellow card) 58'; Henty 66' (pen.); Aleesami (yellow card) 73'; Jradi 90'	Report	Puncheon (yellow card) 33'; Korrea (yellow card) 61'; Waris (yellow card) 90+3'	Stadium: Alphamega Stadium; Referee: A. Argyrou

23 January 2023 20	Aris Limassol	3–1	Apollon Limassol	Limassol
17:00 EET (UTC+2)	Kokorin 29', 84' (pen.); Stępiński 45'; Szöke (yellow card) 53'; Delmiro (yellow card) 88'	Report	Špoljarić (yellow card) 52'; Brorsson 73' (o.g.); Iliev (yellow card) 90+2'	Stadium: Alphamega Stadium; Referee: I. Christodoulou

27 January 2023 21	Apollon Limassol	2–1	Olympiakos Nicosia	Limassol
19:00 EET (UTC+2)	Pittas 49'; Vá (yellow card) 53'; Khammas (yellow card) 68'; Špoljarić 83', (yellow card) 90+8'	Report	Bardy (yellow card) 53'; Šlogar 88'	Stadium: Alphamega Stadium; Referee: T. Hatzivasileiou (Greece)

3 February 2023 22	APOEL	3–1	Apollon Limassol	Nicosia
20:00 EET (UTC+2)	Marquinhos (yellow card) 41'; Ben (yellow card) 44', (goal) 90+6'; Sušić (yellow card) 49'; Kvilitaia 55' (pen.); Ndongala 81'	Report	Pittas 4'; Filiotis (yellow card) 48'; Peybernes (yellow card) 90+5'	Stadium: GSP Stadium; Referee: L. M. Branco Godinho (Poland)

9 February 2023 23	Apollon Limassol	3–4	Karmiotissa	Limassol
19:00 EET (UTC+2)	Donyoh 21'; Shahar 35' (pen.); Pittas 50'; Peybernes (yellow card) 71'; Henty (yellow card) 78'; Artymatas (yellow card) 80'; Špoljarić (yellow card) 90+7'	Report	Coulibaly 43', (yellow card) 55'; El Allouchi 70' (pen.), 85' (pen.), (yellow card) 85'; Gaztañaga (yellow card) 71'; Thandi (yellow card) 75'; Gravenberch 90'	Stadium: Alphamega Stadium; Referee: C. Theouli

18 February 2023 24	Akritas Chlorakas	1–3	Apollon Limassol	Paphos
19:00 EET (UTC+2)	Torres 20'; Clemente (yellow card) 54'	Report	Pittas 64', 89'; Donyoh 73'; Filiotis (yellow card) 76'	Stadium: Stelios Kyriakides Stadium; Referee: K. Fellas

27 February 2023 25	Apollon Limassol	2–1	AEK Larnaca	Limassol
15:30 EET (UTC+2)	Khammas (yellow card) 33' (yellow-red card) 51'; Warda (yellow card) 45+2' (not on pitch), 90+7'; Donyoh 63'; Kyriakou (yellow card) 86'	Report	Miličević 76'; Tomović (yellow card) 90+4'	Stadium: Alphamega Stadium; Referee: I. Bebek (Croatia)

6 March 2023 26	AEL Limassol	0–2	Apollon Limassol	Limassol
18:00 EET (UTC+2)	Mirallas (yellow card) 41'; Panteli (yellow card) 65'; Dewaest (red card) 73'; Tshibola (yellow card) 85'	Report	Pittas 13'; Roberge (red card) 73'; Coll 86'; Zinonos (yellow card) 90+12'	Stadium: Tsirio Stadium; Referee: C. Theouli

==== Championship round ====
===== Championship round table =====
Pos	Team	Pld	W	D	L	GF	GA	GD	Pts	Qualification	ARI	APOE	AEK	PAF	APOL	OMO
1	Aris Limassol (C)	36	21	11	4	65	28	+37	74	Qualification for the Champions League second qualifying round	—	0–0	4–0	2–1	2–0	1–0
2	APOEL	36	20	11	5	52	26	+26	71	Qualification for the Europa Conference League second qualifying round	4–3	—	2–1	0–0	0–2	0–0
3	AEK Larnaca	36	20	6	10	55	37	+18	66	Qualification for the Europa Conference League second qualifying round	1–1	2–2	—	1–1	0–1	2–0
4	Pafos	36	17	12	7	60	30	+30	63		2–2	1–1	4–0	—	2–1	0–1
5	Apollon Limassol	35	19	5	11	47	37	+10	62		0–1	3–2	1–0	0–1	—	3–1
6	Omonia (Note: Cup winner)	36	15	4	17	43	42	+1	49	Qualification for the Europa Conference League second qualifying round	0–3	1–1	0–2	2–0	1–2	—

Source: Cyprus Football Association
Rules for classification: 1) Points; 2) Head-to-head points; 3) Head-to-head goal difference; 4) Head-to-head goals scored; 5) Head-to-head away goals scored (only if two teams); 6) Goal difference; 7) Goals scored; 8) Play-off (only if deciding championship round, relegation round or relegation).
(C) Champions

===== Results summary =====
Overall								Home						Away					
Pld	W	D	L	GF	GA	GD	Pts	W	D	L	GF	GA	GD	W	D	L	GF	GA	GD
10	6	0	4	13	10	+3	18	3	0	2	7	5	+2	3	0	2	6	5	+1

Source: Worldfootball

===== Results by round =====
Round	27	28	29	30	31	32	33	34	35	36
Ground	A	H	H	A	H	H	A	A	H	A
Result	W	W	L	W	L	W	W	L	W	L
Position	5	5	5	5	5	5	5	5	4	5
Points	47	50	50	53	53	56	59	59	62	62

Source: Worldfootball
A = Away; H = Home; W = Win; D = Draw; L = Loss

===== Matches =====
13 March 2023 27	AEK Larnaca	0–1	Apollon Limassol	Larnaca
19:00 EET (UTC+2)	Ledes (red card) 7'; Rosales (yellow card) 72'; Tomović (yellow card) 78' (red card) 90+8'	Report	Pittas (yellow card) 16'; A. Jovanović (yellow card) 25'; Vá (yellow card) 29'; Iliev 37'; Kyriakou (yellow card) 74'; Henty (red card) 90+8'	Stadium: AEK Arena – Georgios Karapatakis; Referee: I. Christodoulou

18 March 2023 28	Apollon Limassol	3–1	Omonia	Limassol
17:00 EET (UTC+2)	Ekpolo 14'; Pittas 45' (pen.); Vá (yellow card) 84'; Warda 88'	Report	Tajouri-Shradi 18'; Matthews (yellow card) 30'; Kakoullis (yellow card) 40'; Kousoulos (yellow card) 69'; Charalampous (yellow card) 90+1'	Stadium: Alphamega Stadium; Referee: C. Theouli

2 April 2023 29	Apollon Limassol	0–1	Aris Limassol	Limassol
19:00 EEST (UTC+3)	Kyriakou (yellow card) 50'; Peybernes (yellow card) 50'; Warda (yellow card) 68'; Coll (yellow card) 85'	Report	Kokorin (yellow card) 43'; Yago (yellow card) 50'; Szöke (yellow card) 54', (goal) 73'; Struski (yellow card) 68'; Pileas (yellow card) 74'	Stadium: Alphamega Stadium; Referee: V. Pizarro (Spain)

10 April 2023 30	APOEL	0–2	Apollon Limassol	Nicosia
19:00 EEST (UTC+3)	Marquinhos (yellow card) 29'; Donis (yellow card) 82'	Report	Kyriakou 24'; Filiotis (yellow card) 41'; Coll (yellow card) 42'; Donyoh (yellow card) 45+1'; Pittas 90+1'	Stadium: GSP Stadium; Referee: J. Sundberg (Denmark)

21 April 2023 31	Apollon Limassol	0–1	Pafos	Limassol
19:00 EEST (UTC+3)	Warda (yellow card) 61'; Donyoh (yellow card) 88'	Report	Abdurahimi 25', (yellow card) 45+2'; Hočko (yellow card) 39'; Ikoko (yellow card) 45+3'; Kané (yellow card) 53' (yellow-red card) 74'; Palacios (yellow card) 90+3'; Kvída (yellow card) 90+9'	Stadium: Alphamega Stadium; Referee: M. Krogh (Denmark)

30 April 2023 32	Apollon Limassol	1–0	AEK Larnaca	Limassol
19:00 EEST (UTC+3)	Kyriakou 51'; Shahar (yellow card) 81'	Report	Ledes (yellow card) 71'; Mamas (yellow card) 90+6'	Stadium: Alphamega Stadium; Referee: V. Ferreira (Portugal)

7 May 2023 33	Omonia	1–2	Apollon Limassol	Nicosia
19:00 EEST (UTC+3)	Kakoullis 41'	Report	Warda 61'; Pittas 86'	Stadium: GSP Stadium; Referee: C. Theouli

14 May 2023 34	Aris Limassol	2–0	Apollon Limassol	Limassol
19:00 EEST (UTC+3)	Mayambela 5'; Babicka 8', (yellow card) 79'; Bengtsson (yellow card) 59'; Delmiro (yellow card) 90+3'	Report	Warda (yellow card) 55'; Roberge (yellow card) 63'; Hussain (yellow card) 90+1'; Joosten (yellow card) 90+6'	Stadium: Tsirio Stadium; Referee: F. Verissimo (Portugal)

21 May 2023 35	Apollon Limassol	3–2	APOEL	Limassol
19:00 EEST (UTC+3)	Pittas 31', 76'; Iliev (yellow card) 64'; Diguiny (yellow card) 70'; Warda 84', (yellow card) 85'	Report	Kvilitaia 22', 90+6', (yellow card) 59'; Sarfo (yellow card) 51'; Macheda (yellow card) 81'	Stadium: Alphamega Stadium; Referee: G. Aureliano (Italy)

28 May 2023 36	Pafos	2–1	Apollon Limassol	Paphos
19:00 EEST (UTC+3)	Kané (yellow card) 43'; Abdurahimi 84'; Bruno 90+5', (yellow card) 90+7' (yellow-red card) 90+12'	Report	Pittas 35'; Iliev (yellow card) 45+5' (yellow-red card) 57'; Mavrias (yellow card) 50'; Dimitriou (yellow card) 61'; Zinonos (yellow card) 88'	Stadium: Stelios Kyriakides Stadium; Attendance: 3,643; Referee: J. L. Sacchi (Italy)

=== Cypriot Cup ===
11 January 2023 Second round	AEL Limassol	0–0 (a.e.t.) (5–4 p)	Apollon Limassol	Limassol
19:00 EET (UTC+2)		Report		Stadium: Alphamega Stadium
	Penalties
	Berahino (penalty scored); Papafotis (penalty scored); Tshibola (penalty scored); Teixeira (penalty scored); Djalma Silva (penalty scored)		(penalty scored) Shahar; (penalty missed) Aleesami; (penalty scored) Khammas; (penalty scored) Joosten; (penalty scored) Diguiny
Note: AEL Limassol won 5–4 on penalties.

=== Cypriot Super Cup ===
As the defending Cypriot First Division champions, Apollon Limassol faced reigning Cypriot Cup winners Omonia in the Cypriot Super Cup.

12 August 2022 Final	Apollon Limassol	2–0	Omonia	Larnaca
20:30 EEST (UTC+3)	Dabo 12'; Filiotis (yellow card) 29' (yellow-red card) 80'; Psychas (penalty missed) 45+1'; Vá (yellow card) 63', (goal) 73'	Report	Matavž (yellow card) 43'; Bruno (yellow card) 52'	Stadium: AEK Arena – Georgios Karapatakis; Attendance: 6,000; Referee: C. Theouli

=== UEFA Champions League ===
==== Qualifying ====
===== Third qualifying round =====
3 August 2022 First leg	Maccabi Haifa (Israel)	4–0	(Cyprus) Apollon Limassol	Haifa, Israel
20:00 IDT (UTC+3)	Peybernes 38' (o.g.); Mohamed 54', 62'; Pierrot 79'	Report	Filiotis (yellow card) 24'; Khammas (yellow card) 30'; V. Jovanović (yellow card) 60' (yellow-red card) 60'	Stadium: Sammy Ofer Stadium; Attendance: 30,000; Referee: Maurizio Mariani (Italy); Assistant referees: Daniele Bindoni (Italy), Alessandro Lo Cicero (Italy); Fourth official: Matteo Marchetti (Italy)

9 August 2022 Second leg	Apollon Limassol (Cyprus)	2–0 (2–4 agg.)	(Israel) Maccabi Haifa	Nicosia, Cyprus
20:00 EEST (UTC+3)	Pittas (yellow card) 11'; Ongenda 19', (yellow card) 60'; Coll 27', (yellow card) 45+5'; Diguiny (yellow card) 42'; Vá (yellow card) 89'	Report	Abu Fani (yellow card) 11'; Menahem (yellow card) 56'; Cornud (yellow card) 68'; Sundgren (yellow card) 86'	Stadium: GSP Stadium; Attendance: 3,936; Referee: Felix Zwayer (Germany); Assistant referees: Stefan Lupp (Germany), Marco Achmüller (Germany); Fourth official: Sven Jablonski (Germany)
Note: Maccabi Haifa won 4–2 on aggregate.

=== UEFA Europa League ===
==== Play-off round ====
18 August 2022 First leg	Apollon Limassol (Cyprus)	1–1	(Greece) Olympiacos	Nicosia, Cyprus
20:00 EEST (UTC+3)	Janga 18'	Report	Hwang 29'; Kouka (yellow card) 83'; Konrad (yellow card) 90+8'	Stadium: GSP Stadium; Attendance: 10,479; Referee: José María Sánchez Martínez (Spain); Assistant referees: Raúl Cabañero (Spain), Iñigo Prieto (Spain); Fourth official: José Luis Munuera (Spain)

25 August 2022 Second leg	Olympiacos (Greece)	1–1 (a.e.t.) (2–2 agg.) (3–1 p)	(Cyprus) Apollon Limassol	Piraeus, Greece
22:00 IDT (UTC+3)	Masouras 2', (yellow card) 45'; O. Ba (yellow card) 64' (yellow-red card) 100'; Reabciuk (yellow card) 87'; Α. Camara (yellow card) 112'	Report	Peybernes (yellow card) 87'; Pittas 90'; E. H. Ba (yellow card) 103'; Roberge (yellow card) 109'	Stadium: Karaiskakis Stadium; Attendance: 20,054; Referee: Sandro Schärer (Switzerland); Assistant referees: Jonas Erni (Switzerland), Jan Köbeli (Switzerland); Fourth official: Fedayi San (Switzerland)
	Penalties
	M'Vila (penalty scored); De la Fuente (penalty scored); Pipa (penalty scored); Ranđelović (penalty missed)		(penalty missed) Kyriakou; (penalty scored) Pittas; (penalty missed) Ongenda; (penalty missed) E. H. Ba
Note: 2–2 on aggregate. Olympiacos won 3–1 on penalties.

=== UEFA Europa Conference League ===
==== Group stage ====
Pos	Team	Pld	W	D	L	GF	GA	GD	Pts	Qualification	AZ	DNI	APL	VAD
1	(Netherlands) AZ	6	5	0	1	12	6	+6	15	Advance to round of 16	—	2–1	3–2	4–1
2	(Ukraine) Dnipro-1	6	3	1	2	9	7	+2	10	Advance to knockout round play-offs	0–1	—	1–0	2–2
3	(Cyprus) Apollon Limassol	6	2	1	3	5	7	−2	7		1–0	1–3	—	1–0
4	(Liechtenstein) Vaduz	6	0	2	4	5	11	−6	2		1–2	1–2	0–0	—

Source: UEFA
Rules for classification: Group stage tiebreakers

8 September 2022 1	Vaduz (Liechtenstein)	0–0	(Cyprus) Apollon Limassol	Vaduz, Liechtenstein
21:00 CEST (UTC+2)	Sutter (yellow card) 28'; Sasere (yellow card) 48'; Hadzi (yellow card) 83'	Report	E. H. Ba (yellow card) 85'; Aleesami (yellow card) 90+2'	Stadium: Rheinpark Stadion; Attendance: 1,188; Referee: Dumitru Muntean (Moldova); Assistant referees: Vlad Lifciu (Moldova), Andrei Bodean (Moldova); Fourth official: Veaceslav Banari (Moldova)

15 September 2022 2	Apollon Limassol (Cyprus)	1–3	(Ukraine) Dnipro-1	Nicosia, Cyprus
19:45 EEST (UTC+3)	Kyriakou (yellow card) 45+4'; Pittas (yellow card) 48', (goal) 58'	Report	Rubchynskyi 11'; Adamyuk (yellow card) 17'; Dovbyk 26', 45'; Babenko (yellow card) 63'; Sarapiy (yellow card) 90+1'	Stadium: GSP Stadium; Attendance: 4,158; Referee: Ádám Farkas (Hungary); Assistant referees: Balázs Szert (Hungary), Péter Garai (Hungary); Fourth official: Bence Csonka (Hungary)

6 October 2022 3	AZ (Netherlands)	3–2	(Cyprus) Apollon Limassol	Alkmaar, Netherlands
21:00 CEST (UTC+2)	Odgaard 16'; De Wit 62' (pen.); Karlsson 85'	Report	Joosten 19'; Cabral (yellow card) 67', (goal) 71'; Vá (yellow card) 88'; Dabo (yellow card) 90'	Stadium: AFAS Stadion; Attendance: 10,016; Referee: Rohit Saggi (Norway); Assistant referees: Geir Isaksen (Norway), Morten Jensen (Norway); Fourth official: Sivert Øksnes Amland (Norway)

13 October 2022 4	Apollon Limassol (Cyprus)	1–0	(Netherlands) AZ	Nicosia, Cyprus
19:45 EEST (UTC+3)	Roberge 32'; A. Jovanović (yellow card) 90+2'	Report	Chatzidiakos (yellow card) 45+2'; Odgaard (yellow card) 73'; De Wit (yellow card) 90+2'	Stadium: GSP Stadium; Attendance: 3,011; Referee: Morten Krogh (Denmark); Assistant referees: D. Wollenberg Rasmussen (Denmark), Jesper Dahl (Denmark); Fourth official: Mikkel Redder (Denmark)

27 October 2022 5	Dnipro-1 (Ukraine)	1–0	(Cyprus) Apollon Limassol	Košice, Slovakia (Note: Due to the Russian invasion of Ukraine, Ukrainian teams were required to play their home matches at neutral venues until further notice. Therefore, Dnipro-1 played at Košická futbalová aréna, Košice, Slovakia, instead of their regular stadium Dnipro-Arena, Dnipro.)
21:00 CEST (UTC+2)	Pikhalyonok 39'	Report	V. Jovanović (yellow card) 27'; Jradi (red card) 88'; Diguiny (yellow card) 90+4'	Stadium: Košická futbalová aréna Attendance: 2,520; Referee: António Nobre (Portugal); Assistant referees: Pedro Ribeiro (Portugal), Nelson Pereira (Portugal); Fourth official: Ricardo Baixinho (Portugal)

3 November 2022 6	Apollon Limassol (Cyprus)	1–0	(Liechtenstein) Vaduz	Nicosia, Cyprus
19:45 EET (UTC+2)	Roberge 32'; Aleesami (yellow card) 89'; Coll (yellow card) 90+3'	Report	Fosso (yellow card) 24'; Omerovic (yellow card) 58'	Stadium: GSP Stadium; Attendance: 712; Referee: Dario Bel (Croatia); Assistant referees: Goran Pataki (Croatia), Kruno Šaric (Croatia); Fourth official: Patrik Kolarić (Croatia)
