= Matija Špoljarić =

Cypriot footballer (born 1997)

Personal information
- Date of birth: 2 April 1997 (age 29)
- Place of birth: Limassol, Cyprus
- Height: 1.77 m (5 ft 10 in)
- Position: Midfielder

Team information
- Current team: Karmiotissa
- Number: 5

Youth career
- –2010: Apollon
- 2010–2016: Atlético Madrid

Senior career*
Years	Team	Apps	(Gls)
2016–2017	Atlético Madrid	0	(0)
2016–2017	→ CD Toledo B (loan)	16	(1)
2017–2019	Apollon Limassol	3	(0)
2018–2019	→ Alki Oroklini (loan)	30	(8)
2019–2021	AEK Larnaca	38	(0)
2021–2024	Aris Limassol	61	(14)
2024–2025	Anorthosis Famagusta	11	(0)
2025–	Karmiotissa	14	(0)

International career^{‡}
2014–2016	Serbia U17	3	(0)
2016–2017	Serbia U19	3	(0)
2017–2018	Cyprus U21	9	(0)
2019–	Cyprus	15	(0)
- * Club domestic league appearances and goals as of 3 May 2026 ‡ National team caps and goals as of 4 July 2025

Matija Špoljarić (Greek: Ματίγια Σπόλιαριτς, born 2 April 1997) is a Cypriot professional footballer who plays as a midfielder for Karmiotissa and the Cyprus national team.

== Club career ==
Špoljarić started his career from the Academies of Apollon Limassol and Atletico Madrid, in Spain, where he played for various teams. Then he came again to Apollon and in the summer of 2019, he switched to AEK Larnaca where he played for two years. Matija joined the newly promoted Cypriot First Division club Aris Limassol in the summer of 2021 and has significantly helped Aris finish 4th in the league (tied for their highest ever placement in the league), scoring 8 goals in total, and qualify for UEFA Europa Conference League for the first time in the club's history.

== International career ==
Špoljarić made his debut for Cyprus national team on 21 March 2019, in a Euro 2020 qualifier against San Marino, as a 54th-minute substitute for Fotios Papoulis.

== Personal life ==
Matija Špoljarić is the son of former Apollon Limassol and Cyprus international midfielder Milenko Špoljarić and he has two brothers Alexander and Danilo.

== Career statistics ==
=== Club ===
As of match played 1 February 2024

Appearances and goals by club, season and competition
Club	Season	League			Cup		Europe		Other		Total	
Club	Season	Division	Apps	Goals	Apps	Goals	Apps	Goals	Apps	Goals	Apps	Goals
CD Toledo B (loan)	2016–17	Tercera División	16	1	—		—		—		16	1
Apollon Limassol	2017–18	Cypriot First Division	3	0	1	0	0	0	1 (Note: Appearance in Cypriot Super Cup)	0	5	0
Alki Oroklini (loan)	2018–19	Cypriot First Division	30	8	0	0	—		—		30	8
AEK Larnaca	2019–20	Cypriot First Division	12	0	1	0	1	0	—		14	0
AEK Larnaca	2020–21	Cypriot First Division	26	0	2	0	—		—		28	0
AEK Larnaca	Total		38	0	3	0	1	0	—		42	0
Aris Limassol	2021–22	Cypriot First Division	28	8	1	0	—		—		29	8
Aris Limassol	2022–23	Cypriot First Division	19	2	0	0	1	0	—		20	2
Aris Limassol	2023–24	Cypriot First Division	11	4	1	0	5	0	1	0	18	4
Aris Limassol	Total		58	14	2	0	6	0	1	0	67	14
Career total			145	23	6	0	7	0	2	0	160	23

=== International ===
As of match played 19 November 2019

Appearances and goals by national team and year
National team	Year	Apps	Goals
Cyprus	2019	9	0
Total		9	0
