= Reinis Reinholds =

Latvian footballer

Personal information
- Date of birth: 26 September 1997 (age 29)
- Place of birth: Ventspils, Latvia
- Height: 2.02 m (6 ft 8 in)
- Position: Goalkeeper

Team information
- Current team: HB Tórshavn
- Number: 13

Youth career
- –2014: Ventspils
- 2014–2015: Latina

Senior career*
Years	Team	Apps	(Gls)
2013	FK Ventspils-2	5	(0)
2014	Ventspils	1	(0)
2015–2016	Padova	0	(0)
2016	Civitanovese	1	(0)
2016–2017	Racing Roma	19	(0)
2017–2020	Pisa	0	(0)
2019–2020	→ Pafos (loan)	0	(0)
2021	Valmiera	0	(0)
2023–2024	Isola Capo Rizzuto		
2025–	HB Tórshavn	6	(0)
- * Club domestic league appearances and goals as of 26 October 2025

Reinis Reinholds (born 26 September 1997) is a Latvian professional footballer who plays as a goalkeeper for Faroe Islands Premier League club HB Tórshavn.

== Club career ==
=== Youth years ===
Reinholds spent his teenage years in the FK Ventspils academy, playing mainly with the under-17 and under-19 teams. He also made five appearances with the reserve squad, Ventspils-2, in the second-tier First League during the 2013 season, as well as one lone appearance with the first team, coming on as a late-match replacement keeper for Maksims Uvarenko, who was sent off during a Latvian Higher League fixture against Skonto on 18 June 2014.

After trialling with Birmingham City, he was discovered by an agent who, in the summer of 2014, helped him make the move to Italian club Latina, where he played Primavera (under-19) football during the 2014–15 season.

=== Professional career ===
In November 2015, Reinholds signed with Serie C club Padova. He failed to make a single appearance during the 2015–16 season, serving as the third-string keeper behind Alessandro Favaro and Lazar Petković.

In the summer of 2016, he signed with Serie D side Civitanovese. However, after making just one league appearance, he was released by the club that December.

Later that month, he returned to Serie C, signing with Racing Roma. At the age of 19, he finally made his professional debut on 23 December 2016, playing as the starting keeper in a 2–1 league defeat to Livorno. For the season, he kept four clean sheets in 19 league appearances as his team finished last in their group. The season was also marred with heavy links to English club Chelsea; scouts were watching his matches in February and he trialled at Cobham Training Centre in May.

However, in August, he signed a three-year contract with Serie C side Pisa. He spent the 2017–18 season as a third-string keeper, failing to come off the bench behind Lazar Petković and Matteo Voltolini. He next year, he was demoted to fourth-string, as he failed to make a single appearance on the bench while Pisa achieved promotion to Serie B.

On 21 August 2019, he was loaned to Cypriot club Pafos. From June 2020, to February 2022, Reinholds was without club, before signing with Valmiera FC. The club confirmed his departure in August 2022.

== Honours ==
=== Club ===
Ventspils

- Virslīga: 2014
