= 2019–20 Cypriot Cup =

78th season of Cypriot Cup

2019–20 Cyprus Coca-Cola Cup

Tournament details
- Country: Cyprus
- Dates: 30 October 2019 – May 2020
- Teams: 24

Final positions
- Champions: abandoned, no champion

Tournament statistics
- Matches played: 24
- Goals scored: 60 (2.5 per match)
- All statistics correct as of 06 March 2020.

The 2019–20 Cypriot Cup was the 78th edition of the Cypriot Cup. A total of 24 clubs were accepted to enter the competition. It begins on 30 October 2019 with the first round and will conclude in May 2020 with the final held at GSP Stadium. The winner of the Cup will qualify for the 2020–21 Europa League second qualifying round.

On 15 May 2020, the cup was abandoned due to COVID-19 pandemic.

== First round ==
The first round draw took place on 30 October 2019 and the matches were played on 30 October 2019.

30 October 2019	Onisilos Sotira 2014	1–5	Ethnikos Achna	Tasos Markou Stadium, Paralimni
14:30 EET

30 October 2019	Olympiakos Nicosia	5–3	Xylotympou	Makareio Stadium, Nicosia(Lefkosia)
14:30 EET

27 November 2019	Ayia Napa	0–3	Pafos FC	Tasos Markou Stadium, Paralimni
14:30 EET

4 December 2019	Othellos	2–3	Enosis Neon Paralimni	Papas Group Ammochostos, Larnaca
14:30 EET

4 December 2019	Apollon Limassol	5–1	Aris Limassol	Tsirion Athlitiko Kentro Stadium, Limassol (Lemesos)
14:30 EET

4 December 2019	Akritas Chlorakas	0–7	Doxa Katokopias	Stadios Stelios Kyriakides, Paphos
14:30 EET				Referee: Andreas Konstantinou

== Second round ==
The second round draw took place on 20 December 2019.

The following eight teams advanced directly to second round and will meet the eight winners of the first round ties:

- AEL Limassol (2018–19 Cypriot Cup winner)
- APOEL (2018–19 Cypriot Cup runners-up)
- Apollon Limassol (via draw)
- Doxa Katokopias (via draw)
- Enosis Neon Paralimni (via draw)
- Ethnikos Achna (via draw)
- Olympiakos Nicosia (via draw)
- Pafos FC (via draw)

Team 1	Agg.	Team 2	1st leg	2nd leg
AEK Larnaca	4–0	Karmiotissa	3–0	1–0
Enosis Neon Paralimni	1–3	Doxa Katokopias	0–2	1–1
AEL Limassol	7–2	Alki	5–1	2–1
Nea Salamis Famagusta	3–1	Pafos FC	1–0	2–1
Anorthosis Famagusta	3–0	Olympiakos Nicosia	0–0	3–0
Omonia	8–0	Ermis Aradippou	5–0	3–0
APOEL	1–3	Apollon Limassol	0–1	1-2
Digenis Oroklinis	0–6	Ethnikos Achna	0–3	0-3

=== First leg ===
8 January 2020	AEK Larnaca	3–0	Karmiotissa	AEK Arena - George Karapatakis Stadium, Larnaka
16:30 EET		Report		Attendance: 500; Referee: Andreas Argyrou

8 January 2020	Enosis Neon Paralimni	0–2	Doxa Katokopias	Stadio Tasos Markou, Paralimni
17:00 EET		Report		Attendance: 100; Referee: Constantinos Photiou

8 January 2020	Alki	1–5	AEL Limassol	Papas Group Ammochostos-Epistrofi, Larnaca
19:00 EET		Report		Attendance: 70; Referee: Anastasis Anastasi

15 January 2020	Pafos FC	0–1	Nea Salamis Famagusta	Stadio Stelios Kyriakides, Pafos
16:00 EET		Report		Attendance: 350; Referee: Chrysovalantis Theouli

15 January 2020	Olympiakos Nicosia	0–0	Anorthosis Famagusta	Makareio Stadio, Nicosia(Lefkosia)
17:00 EET		Report		Attendance: 500; Referee: Kyriakos Christodoulou

15 January 2020	Ermis Aradippou	0–5	Omonia	Papas Group Ammochostos, Larnaca
19:00 EET		Report		Attendance: 448; Referee: Yiannis Anastasiou

22 January 2020	Apollon	1–0	APOEL	Tsirion Athlitiko Kentro, Limassol(Lemesos)
19:00 EET		Report		Attendance: 2,331; Referee: Leontios Trattos

29 January 2020	Digenis Oroklinis	0–3	Ethnikos Achna	Makareio Stadio, Nicosia (Lefkosia)
14:30 EET		Report		Attendance: 50; Referee: Konstantinos Fellas

=== Second leg ===
22 January 2020	Karmiotissa	0–1	AEK Larnaca	Papas Group Ammochostos, Larnaca
18:00 EET		Report		Attendance: 100; Referee: Konstantinos Fellas

== Quarter-finals ==
Team 1	Agg.	Team 2	1st leg	2nd leg
AEL Limassol	1–1 (a)	AEK Larnaca	0–0	1–1 (a.e.t.)
Anorthosis Famagusta	3–1	Nea Salamis Famagusta	1–1	2–0
Apollon Limassol	3–2	Ethnikos Achna	2–0	1–2 (a.e.t.)
Omonia	5–2	Doxa Katokopias	4–1	1–1

== Semi-finals ==
All matches cancelled.

Team 1	Agg.	Team 2	1st leg	2nd leg
Apollon Limassol	Canc.	AEL Limassol	Canc.	Canc.
Omonia	Canc.	Anorthosis Famagusta	Canc.	Canc.

== Final ==
Cancelled.

== See also ==
- 2019–20 Cypriot First Division
- 2019–20 Cypriot Second Division
