= Jerson Cabral =

Dutch-Cape Verdean footballer

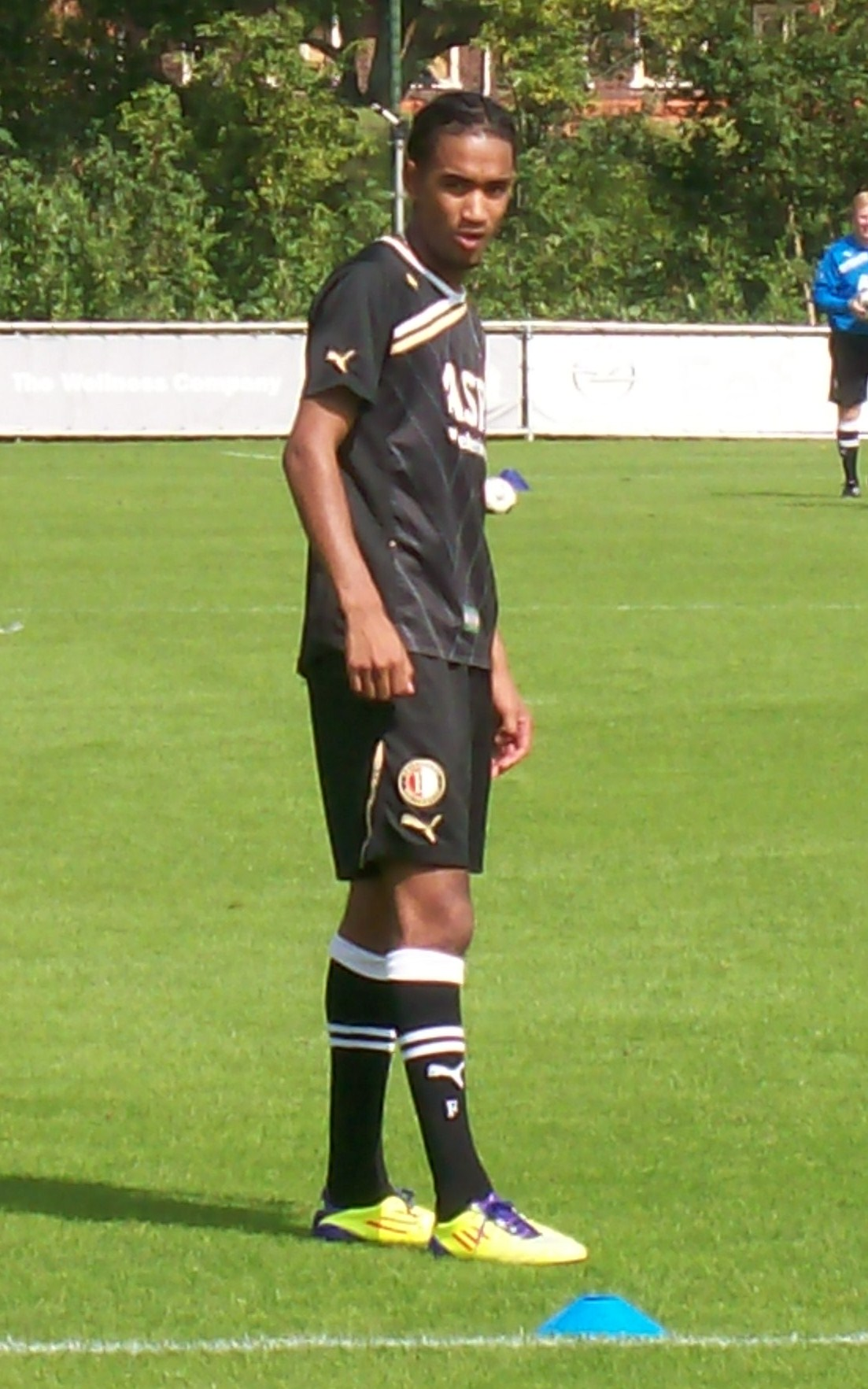
- Cabral with Feyenoord in August 2011

Personal information
- Date of birth: 3 January 1991 (age 35)
- Place of birth: Rotterdam, Netherlands
- Height: 1.77 m (5 ft 10 in)
- Position: Winger

Youth career
- Feyenoord

Senior career*
Years	Team	Apps	(Gls)
2010–2012	Feyenoord	52	(8)
2012–2016	Twente	33	(6)
2013–2014	→ ADO Den Haag (loan)	14	(0)
2014	Jong Twente	1	(0)
2014–2015	→ Willem II (loan)	17	(2)
2016–2017	Bastia	6	(0)
2017	→ Sparta (loan)	13	(0)
2017–2019	Levski Sofia	47	(9)
2019–2021	Pafos	29	(4)
2021–2023	Ionikos	30	(1)
2023	Kalamata	4	(0)
2025	Volendam	2	(0)
Total		248	(30)

International career^{‡}
2007–2008	Netherlands U17	7	(1)
2008–2010	Netherlands U19	14	(2)
2010–2013	Netherlands U21	8	(0)
- * Club domestic league appearances and goals as of 13 May 2025 ‡ National team caps and goals as of 31 December 2013

Jerson Cabral (born 3 January 1991) is a Dutch professional footballer who plays as a winger.

== Club career ==
=== Feyenoord ===
Cabral was scouted by Feyenoord at the age of seven. He made his professional debut for Feyenoord on 8 August 2010. He replaced Diego Biseswar in the 51st minute of the Eredivisie home match against FC Utrecht (3–1). On 27 August 2010, Cabral made his European debut. He replaced Tim de Cler in the 82nd minute of the Europa League away match against Gent (2–0).

At the start of the 2012–13 season Cabral refused to extend his contract, which would expire at the end of the season.

=== Twente ===
Cabral was then traded to FC Twente, in exchange of Wesley Verhoek. At FC Twente he signed a four-year contract. His first season at FC Twente was a disappointing one, with only ten appearances.

At the start of the 2013–14 season Cabral was loaned to ADO Den Haag. Here he made 14 appearances in the first team.

During the 2014–15 season Cabral was loaned to Willem II, in the final minutes of the summer transfer window. In their home match against FC Twente that season, he scored twice, leading them to a 2–2 draw.

=== Bastia ===
In summer 2016 Cabral moved abroad on a free transfer to play for French side Bastia, but was loaned to Sparta in the January 2017 transfer window.

=== Levski Sofia ===
On 12 September 2017, Cabral signed a two-year contract with Bulgarian club Levski Sofia.

=== Pafos ===
In September 2019 Cabral joined Cypriot side Pafos.

=== Ionikos ===
On 10 July 2021, he signed a contract with Ionikos on a free transfer.

=== Kalamata ===
On 30 September 2023, Cabral signed for Super League Greece 2 club Kalamata.

=== Volendam ===
After a year without club football, on 31 January 2025 Cabral signed with Volendam on an amateur basis.

== International career ==
Cabral was born in the Netherlands to a Cape Verdean father, and Dutch mother. He played at various levels for Dutch youth teams, including the Netherlands U17s, Netherlands U19s, and Netherlands U21s. In March 2016, Cabral was called up to the Cape Verde national football team for 2017 Africa Cup of Nations qualification against Morocco.

== Personal life ==
Jerson has a twin brother, Jercely. His cousin, Garry Rodrigues, is also a footballer who also played for Levski Sofia before Jerson. Jerson also fathers two daughters with a long-term girlfriend.

== Career statistics ==
=== Club ===
As of match played 18 March 2023

Club	Season	League			National cup (Note: Includes KNVB Cup, Coupe de France, Bulgarian Cup, Cypriot Cup, Greek Football Cup)		League cup (Note: Includes Coupe de la Ligue)		Continental		Total	
Club	Season	Division	Apps	Goals	Apps	Goals	Apps	Goals	Apps	Goals	Apps	Goals
Feyenoord	2010–11	Eredivisie	23	1	1	0	—		1 (Note: Appearance(s) in UEFA Europa League)	0	25	1
Feyenoord	2011–12	Eredivisie	28	7	2	0	—		—		30	7
Feyenoord	2012–13	Eredivisie	1	0	0	0	—		1 (Note: Appearance(s) in UEFA Champions League)	0	2	0
Feyenoord	Total		52	8	3	0	—		2	0	57	8
Twente	2012–13	Eredivisie	9	0	2	0	—		3	0	14	0
Twente	2015–16	Eredivisie	24	6	1	0	—		—		25	6
Twente	Total		33	6	3	0	—		3	0	39	6
ADO Den Haag (loan)	2013–14	Eredivisie	14	0	2	0	—		—		16	0
Jong Twente	2014–15	Eerste Divisie	1	0	—		—		—		1	0
Willem II (loan)	2014–15	Eredivisie	17	2	1	0	—		—		18	2
Bastia	2016–17	Ligue 1	6	0	1	0	1	0	—		8	0
Sparta Rotterdam (loan)	2016–17	Eredivisie	13	0	1	0	—		—		14	0
Levski Sofia	2017–18	Bulgarian First League	21	1	5	1	—		0	0	26	2
Levski Sofia	2018–19	Bulgarian First League	26	8	1	1	—		2	1	29	10
Levski Sofia	Total		47	9	6	2	—		2	1	55	12
Pafos	2019–20	Cypriot First Division	11	3	2	0	—		—		13	3
Pafos	2020–21	Cypriot First Division	18	1	0	0	—		—		18	1
Pafos	Total		29	4	2	0	—		—		31	4
Ionikos	2021–22	Super League Greece	23	1	3	0	—		—		26	1
Ionikos	2022–23	Super League Greece	7	0	0	0	—		—		7	0
Ionikos	Total		30	1	3	0	—		—		33	1
Kalamata	2023–24	Super League Greece 2	0	0	0	0	—		—		0	0
Career total			242	30	22	2	1	0	7	1	272	33
