= Milenko Špoljarić =

Cypriot footballer (born 1967)

Personal information
- Full name: Milenko Špoljarić
- Date of birth: 24 January 1967 (age 59)
- Place of birth: Belišće, SR Croatia, SFR Yugoslavia
- Height: 1.80 m (5 ft 11 in)
- Position: Midfielder

Youth career
- Belišće

Senior career*
Years	Team	Apps	(Gls)
1987–1989	Osijek	0	(0)
1989–1992	OFK Beograd	95	(21)
1992–2003	Apollon Limassol	250	(115)
2003–2004	AEP Paphos	23	(0)

International career
1997–2001	Cyprus	21	(8)
1998	Cyprus B	1	(1)

Managerial career
- 2004–2005: Aris Limassol
- * Club domestic league appearances and goals

Milenko Špoljarić (Greek: Μιλένκο Σπόλιαριτς; born 24 January 1967) is a former footballer and manager. Born in Croatia, he represented Cyprus internationally.

== Club career ==
Born in Belišće, SR Croatia, SFR Yugoslavia, Špoljarić played for Yugoslav First League clubs NK Osijek and OFK Beograd. He left in 1992 signing with Cypriot club Apollon Limassol where he played for 11 seasons, until 2003. Before retiring from professional playing he played one last season with AEP Paphos. With Apollon he scored 78 goals in 250 appearances.

== International career ==
After playing several seasons in Cyprus, he made his debut for Cyprus in an October 1997 World Cup qualification match against Luxembourg and earned a total of 22 caps (1 unofficial), scoring 9 goals. His final international was a March 2001 World Cup qualification match against Estonia.

After retiring he initiated his coaching career.

== Personal life ==
His father is an ethnic Croat while his mother is an ethnic Serb. He has three sons: Alexander, Matija and Danilo.

== International goals ==
No.	Date	Venue	Opponent	Score	Result	Competition
1.	11 October 1997	Limassol, Cyprus	Luxembourg	2–0	2–0	1998 FIFA World Cup qualification
2.	5 September 1998	Larnaca, Cyprus	Spain	3–1	3–2	UEFA Euro 2000 qualifying
3.	18 November 1998	Serravalle, San Marino	San Marino	1–0	1–0	UEFA Euro 2000 qualifying
4.	5 September 1999	Limassol, Cyprus	Israel	2–1	3–2	UEFA Euro 2000 qualifying
5.	5 September 1999	Limassol, Cyprus	Israel	3–2	3–2	UEFA Euro 2000 qualifying
6.	4 February 2000	Strovolos, Cyprus	Armenia	2–0	3–2 (a.e.t.)	2000 Cyprus International Tournament
7.	4 February 2000	Strovolos, Cyprus	Armenia	3–2	3–2 (a.e.t.)	2000 Cyprus International Tournament
8.	15 November 2000	Limassol, Cyprus	Andorra	5–0	5–0	2002 FIFA World Cup qualification
