= Danilo Špoljarić =

Cypriot footballer (born 1999)

Personal information
- Full name: Danilo Špoljarić
- Date of birth: 14 July 1999 (age 27)
- Place of birth: Limassol, Cyprus
- Height: 1.89 m (6 ft 2 in)
- Position: Midfielder

Team information
- Current team: Apollon Limassol
- Number: 20

Youth career
- Apollon

Senior career*
Years	Team	Apps	(Gls)
2016–	Apollon Limassol	117	(4)
2019–2020	→ Enosis Neon Paralimni (loan)	16	(0)
2020–2021	→ Zemplín Michalovce (loan)	14	(0)

International career^{‡}
2018-2020	Cyprus U21	7	(0)
2022-	Cyprus	17	(1)
- * Club domestic league appearances and goals as of 14 June 2026 ‡ National team caps and goals as of 13 July 2026

Danilo Špoljarić (Greek: Ντανίλο Σπόλιαριτς; born 14 July 1999) is a Cypriot professional footballer who plays as a midfielder for Apollon Limassol.

== Club career ==
Spoljaric started his senior career at Apollon Limassol in 2018. After performing well in the opportunities he had here, he signed a new three-year contract with Apollon Limassol on 30 June 2019. On 1 July 2019, Apollon Limassol was loaned to Enosis Neon Paralimni on a one-year loan. He came back to Apollon Limassol from Enosis Neon Paralimni on 30 June 2020. It was then leased to Zemplín Michalovce by Apollon Limassol on 22 August 2020 for one year. Špoljarić returned to Apollon Limassol on loan on 31 June 2021. He scored his first career goal for Apollon Limassol in the 2021–22 season in the 51st minute of their 2–1 loss against AEK Larnaca on 8 January 2022. He scored his second goal in the 2021–22 season in the 11th minute of the match, which they won 4–1 against Aris Limassol. Špoljarić has not contributed a goal so far in the 2022–23 season.

== International career ==
Špoljarić debuted with the Cyprus national team in a 0–0 2020–21 UEFA Nations League tie with Estonia on 24 March 2022. Špoljarić was invited to Cyprus national team for friendlies on 11 November 2022.

== Personal life ==
Danilo Špoljarić is the son of former Apollon Limassol and Cyprus international midfielder Milenko Špoljarić. He has two older brothers, Alexander Špoljarić and Matija Špoljarić who are also footballers.

== Career statistics ==
=== Club ===
As of match played 25 July 2026

Appearances and goals by club, season and competition
Club	Season	League			Cup		Continental		Other		Total	
Club	Season	Division	Apps	Goals	Apps	Goals	Apps	Goals	Apps	Goals	Apps	Goals
Apollon Limassol	2018-19	Cypriot First Division	8	0	0	0	1	0	—		9	0
Apollon Limassol	2021–22	Cypriot First Division	17	2	2	0	0	0	—		18	2
Apollon Limassol	2022–23	Cypriot First Division	21	1	1	0	7	0	—		29	1
Apollon Limassol	2023–24	Cypriot First Division	26	1	5	3	—		—		31	4
Apollon Limassol	2024–25	Cypriot First Division	27	0	2	1	—		—		29	1
Apollon Limassol	2025–26	Cypriot First Division	18	0	3	0	—		—		21	0
Apollon Limassol	2026–27	Cypriot First Division	0	0	0	0	1	0	—		1	0
Apollon Limassol	Total		117	4	13	4	9	0	0	0	139	8
Enosis Neon Paralimni (loan)	2019–20	Cypriot First Division	16	0	2	0	—		—		18	0
Zemplín Michalovce (loan)	2020–21	Fortuna Liga	14	0	3	0	—		—		17	0
Career total			147	4	20	4	9	0	0	0	174	8

=== International ===
As of match played 18 November 2024

Appearances and goals by national team and year
National team	Year	Apps	Goals
Cyprus	2022	4	0
Cyprus	2023	6	0
Cyprus	2024	7	1
Total		17	1

Scores and results list Cyprus's goal tally first, score column indicates score after each Špoljarić goal.

List of international goals scored by Danilo Špoljarić
No.	Date	Venue	Opponent	Score	Result	Competition
1	8 June 2024	Zimbru Stadium, Chișinău, Moldova	Moldova	1–1	2–3	Friendly

== Honours ==
Apollon Limassol

- Cypriot First Division: 2021–22
