= Charalampos Kyriakou =

Cypriot footballer (born 1995)

Champos Kyriakou
Personal information
- Full name: Charalampos Kyriakou
- Date of birth: 9 February 1995 (age 31)
- Place of birth: Limassol, Cyprus
- Height: 1.80 m (5 ft 11 in)
- Positions: Defensive midfielder; centre-back

Team information
- Current team: AEK Larnaca
- Number: 25

Youth career
- 2000–2008: Campus Sportivo Football Academy
- 2008–2012: Apollon Limassol

Senior career*
Years	Team	Apps	(Gls)
2011–2025	Apollon Limassol	241	(6)
2017–2018	→ Estoril (loan)	19	(2)
2025–2026	Dinamo București	19	(0)
2026–	AEK Larnaca	17	(0)

International career^{‡}
2011	Cyprus U17	4	(0)
2012–2013	Cyprus U19	8	(1)
2013–2015	Cyprus U21	6	(0)
2014–	Cyprus	79	(0)
- * Club domestic league appearances and goals as of 14 June 2026 ‡ National team caps and goals as of 18:50, 5 October 2026 (UTC)

Charalampos "Champos" Kyriakou (Greek: Χαράλαμπος «Χάμπος» Κυριάκου; born 9 February 1995) is a Cypriot professional footballer who plays as a defensive midfielder or a centre-back for Cypriot First Division club AEK Larnaca club and the Cyprus national team.

== International career ==
Kyriakou made his debut with the Cyprus national football team on 5 March 2014 in a friendly match against Northern Ireland when he replaced Vincent Laban in the 67th minute.

== Career statistics ==
=== Club ===
As of 8 February 2026

Appearances and goals by club, season and competition
Club	Season	League			National cup (Note: Includes Cypriot Cup, Taça de Portugal, Cupa României)		Europe		Other		Total	
Club	Season	Division	Apps	Goals	Apps	Goals	Apps	Goals	Apps	Goals	Apps	Goals
Apollon Limassol	2011–12	Cypriot First Division	5	0	0	0	—		—		5	0
Apollon Limassol	2012–13	Cypriot First Division	11	0	6	1	—		—		17	1
Apollon Limassol	2013–14	Cypriot First Division	11	0	3	0	4 (Note: Appearance(s) in UEFA Europa League)	0	1 (Note: Appearance in Cypriot Super Cup)	0	19	0
Apollon Limassol	2014–15	Cypriot First Division	10	0	2	0	1	0	—		13	0
Apollon Limassol	2015–16	Cypriot First Division	9	0	4	0	2	0	—		15	0
Apollon Limassol	2016–17	Cypriot First Division	24	1	5	0	2	0	1	0	32	1
Apollon Limassol	2017–18	Cypriot First Division	0	0	0	0	6	1	1	0	7	1
Apollon Limassol	2018–19	Cypriot First Division	21	0	3	0	11	1	—		35	1
Apollon Limassol	2019–20	Cypriot First Division	16	0	1	0	6	0	—		23	0
Apollon Limassol	2020–21	Cypriot First Division	31	0	1	0	0	0	—		32	0
Apollon Limassol	2021–22	Cypriot First Division	23	1	2	0	2 (Note: Appearances in UEFA Europa Conference League)	0	—		27	1
Apollon Limassol	2022–23	Cypriot First Division	25	2	0	0	9 (Note: Two appearances in UEFA Champions League, two appearances in UEFA Europa League, five appearances in UEFA Europa Conference League)	0	0	0	34	2
Apollon Limassol	2023–24	Cypriot First Division	30	0	4	0	—		—		34	0
Apollon Limassol	2024–25	Cypriot First Division	25	2	4	0	—		—		29	2
Apollon Limassol	Total		241	6	35	1	43	2	3	0	322	9
Estoril (loan)	2017–18	Primeira Liga	19	2	1	0	—		—		20	2
Dinamo București	2025–26	Liga I	19	0	2	0	—		—		21	0
AEK Larnaca	2025–26	Cypriot First Division	3	0	—		0	0	—		3	0
Career total			282	8	38	1	43	2	3	0	366	11

=== International ===
As of match played 5 October 2026

Appearances and goals by national team and year
National team	Year	Apps	Goals
Cyprus	2014	1	0
Cyprus	2015	0	0
Cyprus	2016	5	0
Cyprus	2017	10	0
Cyprus	2018	4	0
Cyprus	2019	6	0
Cyprus	2020	7	0
Cyprus	2021	10	0
Cyprus	2022	10	0
Cyprus	2023	8	0
Cyprus	2024	4	0
Cyprus	2025	9	0
Cyprus	2026	5	0
Total		79	0

== Honours ==
Apollon Limassol

- Cypriot First Division: 2021–22
- Cypriot Cup: 2012–13, 2015–16, 2016–17
- Cypriot Super Cup: 2016, 2017, 2022
