= Alexander Špoljarić =

Cypriot footballer

Personal information
- Full name: Alexander Matija Špoljarić
- Date of birth: 28 November 1995 (age 30)
- Place of birth: Limassol, Cyprus
- Height: 1.89 m (6 ft 2 1/2 in)
- Position: Goalkeeper

Team information
- Current team: Karmiotissa
- Number: 1

Youth career
- 2007–2012: Aris Limassol
- 2012–2014: Enosis Neon Parekklisia

Senior career*
| Years | Team | Apps | (Gls) |
| 2013–2014 | Enosis Neon Parekklisia | 7 | (0) |
| 2014–2017 | OFK Beograd | 1 | (0) |
| 2017 | → Hajduk Beograd (loan) | 10 | (0) |
| 2017–2018 | Grafičar Beograd | 0 | (0) |
| 2018–2019 | Aris Limassol | 11 | (0) |
| 2019–2020 | Alki Oroklini | 14 | (0) |
| 2020–2021 | Othellos Athienou | 27 | (0) |
| 2021–2022 | Nea Salamis | 1 | (0) |
| 2022– | Karmiotissa | 39 | (0) |
- * Club domestic league appearances and goals as of 3 May 2026

Alexander Špoljarić (Greek: Αλεξάντερ Σπόλιαριτς; born 28 November 1995) is a Cypriot football goalkeeper who plays for Karmiotissa.

== Club career ==
Born in Limassol, he started playing football in Campus Sportivo Football Academy when he was 4 years old. After completing seven years at the academy, he trained with his father's academy for 1 year as a goalkeeper. Later he was with Aris Limassol academy until he was 17. Finally, he moved to Enosis Neon Parekklisia, which also became his first team after his youth career ended. In summer 2014, he joined OFK Beograd, where he made his professional debut in the last fixture of the 2014–15 Serbian SuperLiga season, against Jagodina. At the beginning of 2017, Špoljarić moved to Belgrade Zone League side Hajduk Beograd on six-month loan. In summer 2017, he moved to Grafičar Beograd as a single player.

Ahead of the 2019-20 season, Špoljarić joined Alki Oroklini. He then moved to Othellos Athienou for the 2020-21 season. In the summer 2021, he moved to Nea Salamis Famagusta FC.

== Career statistics ==
As of 19 June 2017

| Club | Season | League | | | Cup | | Continental | | Other | | Total | |
| Club | Season | Division | Apps | Goals | Apps | Goals | Apps | Goals | Apps | Goals | Apps | Goals |
|---|---|---|---|---|---|---|---|---|---|---|---|---|
| OFK Beograd | 2014–15 | Serbian SuperLiga | 1 | 0 | 0 | 0 | — | | — | | 1 | 0 |
| OFK Beograd | 2015–16 | Serbian SuperLiga | 0 | 0 | 0 | 0 | — | | — | | 0 | 0 |
| OFK Beograd | 2016–17 | Serbian First League | 0 | 0 | 0 | 0 | — | | — | | 0 | 0 |
| OFK Beograd | Total | | 1 | 0 | 0 | 0 | — | | — | | 1 | 0 |
| Hajduk Beograd (loan) | 2016–17 | Belgrade Zone League | 10 | 0 | — | | — | | — | | 10 | 0 |
| Grafičar Beograd | 2017–18 | Serbian League Belgrade | 0 | 0 | — | | — | | — | | 0 | 0 |
| Career total | | | 11 | 0 | 0 | 0 | — | | — | | 11 | 0 |

== Personal life ==
Alexander's father is Milenko Špoljarić, who was also a footballer; he is the older brother of Matija and Danilo Špoljarić.
