= Andreas Panagiotou Filiotis =

Greek footballer (born 1995)

Personal information
- Full name: Andreas Panagiotou Filiotis
- Date of birth: 31 May 1995 (age 31)
- Place of birth: Nicosia, Cyprus
- Height: 1.73 m (5 ft 8 in)
- Position: Full back

Team information
- Current team: Nea Salamina
- Number: 30

Youth career
- Omonia

Senior career*
| Years | Team | Apps | (Gls) |
| 2012–2018 | Omonia | 22 | (0) |
| 2018–2020 | Pafos | 38 | (1) |
| 2020–2024 | Apollon Limassol | 84 | (1) |
| 2024–2026 | AEL Limassol | 43 | (2) |
| 2026– | Nea Salamina | 5 | (1) |

International career^{‡}
| 2014 | Cyprus U19 | 11 | (1) |
| 2014 | Cyprus U21 | 4 | (0) |
| 2017– | Cyprus | 7 | (0) |
- * Club domestic league appearances and goals as of 15 May 2026 ‡ National team caps and goals as of 22 March 2017

Andreas Panagiotou Filiotis (Greek: Ανδρέας Παναγιώτου Φιλιώτης; born 31 May 1995) is a Cypriot professional football player, who plays for Nea Salamina.

== Career ==
He started his career with Omonia, making his first appearance for the senior squad during the 2012–13 season on Cypriot Cup.

== Career statistics ==
=== Club ===
As of match played 22 May 2024

| Club | Season | League | | | Cup | | Continental | | Other | | Total | |
| Club | Season | Division | Apps | Goals | Apps | Goals | Apps | Goals | Apps | Goals | Apps | Goals |
|---|---|---|---|---|---|---|---|---|---|---|---|---|
| Omonia | 2012–13 | Cypriot First Division | 0 | 0 | 1 | 0 | 0 | 0 | — | | 1 | 0 |
| Omonia | 2013–14 | Cypriot First Division | 0 | 0 | 0 | 0 | 0 | 0 | — | | 0 | 0 |
| Omonia | 2014–15 | Cypriot First Division | 2 | 0 | 2 | 0 | 0 | 0 | — | | 4 | 0 |
| Omonia | 2015–16 | Cypriot First Division | 1 | 0 | 1 | 0 | 0 | 0 | — | | 2 | 0 |
| Omonia | 2016–17 | Cypriot First Division | 14 | 0 | 2 | 0 | 1 | 0 | — | | 17 | 0 |
| Omonia | 2017–18 | Cypriot First Division | 5 | 0 | 1 | 0 | — | | — | | 6 | 0 |
| Omonia | Total | | 22 | 0 | 7 | 0 | 1 | 0 | — | | 30 | 0 |
| Pafos | 2018–19 | Cypriot First Division | 21 | 0 | 1 | 0 | — | | — | | 22 | 0 |
| Pafos | 2019–20 | Cypriot First Division | 17 | 1 | 1 | 0 | — | | — | | 18 | 1 |
| Pafos | Total | | 38 | 1 | 2 | 0 | — | | — | | 40 | 1 |
| Apollon Limassol | 2020–21 | Cypriot First Division | 15 | 1 | 0 | 0 | 0 | 0 | — | | 15 | 1 |
| Apollon Limassol | 2021–22 | Cypriot First Division | 24 | 0 | 3 | 0 | 2 | 0 | — | | 29 | 0 |
| Apollon Limassol | 2022–23 | Cypriot First Division | 21 | 0 | 0 | 0 | 3 | 0 | 1 | 0 | 25 | 0 |
| Apollon Limassol | 2023–24 | Cypriot First Division | 24 | 0 | 3 | 0 | — | | — | | 27 | 0 |
| Apollon Limassol | Total | | 84 | 1 | 6 | 0 | 5 | 0 | 1 | 0 | 96 | 1 |
| Career Total | | | 144 | 1 | 15 | 0 | 6 | 0 | 1 | 0 | 166 | 2 |
