= Mickaël Panos =

French footballer (born 1997)

Personal information
- Full name: Mickaël Guillaume Kévin Panos
- Date of birth: 10 February 1997 (age 29)
- Place of birth: Orsay, France
- Height: 1.83 m (6 ft 0 in)
- Position: Defensive midfielder

Team information
- Current team: CSM Olimpia Satu Mare
- Number: 91

Youth career
- 2003–2005: Forges OC
- 2005–2008: FC Forges Gometz
- 2008–2011: Les Ulis
- 2011–2012: Linas-Montlhéry
- 2012–2016: Châteauroux

Senior career*
Years	Team	Apps	(Gls)
2015–2017	Châteauroux B	13	(0)
2016–2017	Châteauroux	2	(0)
2017–2019	Saint-Étienne B	45	(1)
2018–2019	Saint-Étienne	1	(0)
2019–2021	Pafos	24	(0)
2021	→ Enosis Neon Paralimni (loan)	8	(1)
2022	Vllaznia Shkodër	2	(0)
2022–2023	FK Csíkszereda	18	(1)
2023–2024	1599 Șelimbăr	29	(0)
2024	Voluntari	11	(0)
2025–2026	Voluntari	2	(0)
2026–	CSM Olimpia Satu Mare	23	(2)

International career
2015	France U19	1	(0)
- * Club domestic league appearances and goals as of 31 October 2026

Mickaël Guillaume Kévin Panos (Greek: Μιχάλης Γουλιέλμος Κέβιν Πάνος, romanized: Mihalis Gouliélmos Kévin Panos; born 10 February 1997) is a French professional footballer who plays as a defensive midfielder for Liga II club CSM Olimpia Satu Mare.

== Club career ==
Panos made his professional debut for Saint-Étienne in a 2–0 Ligue 1 win over Monaco on 28 September 2018.

In summer 2023, Panos signed a contract with 1599 Șelimbăr.

== International career ==
Born in France, Panos is of Greek descent. Panos made one appearance for the France U19s in a 1–1 friendly tie with the Serbia U19s.

== Honours ==
Châteauroux

- Championnat National: 2016–17

Vllaznia Shköder

- Albanian Cup: 2021–22
