= Israel Coll =

Argentine footballer (born 1993)

Personal information
- Full name: Israel Emanuel Coll
- Date of birth: 22 July 1993 (age 33)
- Place of birth: Córdoba, Argentina
- Height: 1.76 m (5 ft 9 1/2 in)
- Position: Midfielder

Team information
- Current team: F.C. Ashdod

Senior career*
Years	Team	Apps	(Gls)
2011–2017	Ferro Carril Oeste	108	(6)
2016	→ Sarmiento (loan)	4	(0)
2016–2017	→ Central Córdoba (loan)	24	(0)
2017–2018	Central Córdoba	23	(0)
2018–2019	Panachaiki	36	(4)
2020–2021	Apollon Smyrnis	41	(1)
2021–2025	Apollon Limassol	104	(2)
2025–	F.C. Ashdod	10	(1)
- * Club domestic league appearances and goals as of 12 May 2025

Israel Emanuel Coll (born 22 July 1993) is an Argentine professional footballer who plays as a midfielder for F.C. Ashdod.

== Career ==
Coll's first senior club became Ferro Carril Oeste in 2011–12, when he was an unused substitute on four occasions for the Primera B Nacional outfit. He made his professional debut in March 2013, featuring for the full duration of a 0–0 draw with Douglas Haig on 18 March. Two months later, Coll scored his first goal in a draw with Huracán. One hundred and five further appearances followed for Coll between 2013 and 2015; he also netted seven more goals in that period. He was loaned to Sarmiento of the Argentine Primera División on 7 January 2016. He featured four times as Sarmiento placed tenth in zone one.

In the subsequent campaign, 2016–17, Coll was signed on loan by Primera B Nacional's Central Córdoba. His debut season ended with relegation to Torneo Federal A, despite that Coll agreed to sign permanently in August 2017. After Central Córdoba achieved instant promotion back up as champions, Coll departed the club and Argentine football as he joined Greek Football League side Panachaiki on 25 July 2018. He scored on his league debut, netting in a 2–2 draw with Aiginiakos on 28 October.

== Career statistics ==
As of 4 January 2024.

Club statistics
Club	Season	League			Cup		Continental		Other		Total	
Club	Season	Division	Apps	Goals	Apps	Goals	Apps	Goals	Apps	Goals	Apps	Goals
Ferro Carril Oeste	2011–12	Primera B Nacional	0	0	0	0	—		0	0	0	0
Ferro Carril Oeste	2012–13	Primera B Nacional	11	1	0	0	—		0	0	11	1
Ferro Carril Oeste	2013–14	Primera B Nacional	39	2	1	1	—		0	0	40	3
Ferro Carril Oeste	2014	Primera B Nacional	20	0	1	0	—		0	0	21	0
Ferro Carril Oeste	2015	Primera B Nacional	38	3	3	1	—		1 (Note: Appearance(s) in the Primera B Nacional play-offs)	0	42	4
Ferro Carril Oeste	2016	Primera B Nacional	0	0	0	0	—		0	0	0	0
Ferro Carril Oeste	2016–17	Primera B Nacional	0	0	0	0	—		0	0	0	0
Ferro Carril Oeste	Total		108	6	5	2	—		1	0	114	8
Sarmiento (loan)	2016	Primera División	4	0	0	0	—		0	0	4	0
Central Córdoba (loan)	2016–17	Primera B Nacional	24	0	1	0	—		—		25	0
Central Córdoba	2017–18	Torneo Federal A	23	0	4	0	—		—		27	0
Central Córdoba	Total		47	0	5	0	—		—		52	0
Panachaiki	2018–19	Football League	26	3	4	0	—		—		30	3
Panachaiki	2019–20	Super LeagueGreece 2	10	1	3	0	—		—		13	1
Panachaiki	Total		36	4	7	0	—		—		43	4
Apollon Smyrnis	2019–20	Super League Greece 2	11	1	—		—		—		11	1
Apollon Smyrnis	2020–21	Super League Greece	30	0	0	0	—		—		30	0
Apollon Smyrnis	Total		41	1	0	0	—		—		41	1
Apollon Limassol	2021–22	Cypriot First Division	30	0	3	0	2	1	—		35	1
Apollon Limassol	2022–23	Cypriot First Division	26	1	0	0	10	1	1	0	37	2
Apollon Limassol	2023–24	Cypriot First Division	13	1	1	0	—		—		14	1
Apollon Limassol	Total		69	2	4	0	12	1	1	0	86	4
Career total			305	13	21	2	12	2	2	0	340	17

== Honours ==
Central Córdoba

- Torneo Federal A: 2017–18
