= Alessandro Favaro =

Italian footballer (born 1995)

Personal information
- Date of birth: 18 July 1995 (age 31)
- Place of birth: San Vito al Tagliamento, Italy
- Height: 1.89 m (6 ft 2 in)
- Position: Goalkeeper

Youth career
- –2013: Udinese

Senior career*
Years	Team	Apps	(Gls)
2012–2014	Udinese	0	(0)
2013–2014	→ Virtus Verona (loan)	0	(0)
2014–2015	Sacilese	33	(0)
2015–2019	Padova	18	(0)
2017–2018	→ Mestre (loan)	21	(0)
- * Club domestic league appearances and goals as of 11 May 2019

Alessandro Favaro (born 18 July 1995) is an Italian football player.

== Club career ==
He made his Serie C debut for Padova on 27 September 2017 in a game against FeralpiSalò.
