= Dimitris Theodorou =

Cypriot footballer (born 1997)

Personal information
- Full name: Dimitris Theodorou
- Date of birth: 10 September 1997 (age 29)
- Place of birth: Larnaca, Cyprus
- Height: 1.75 m (5 ft 9 in)
- Position: Winger

Team information
- Current team: Anorthosis
- Number: 11

Senior career*
Years	Team	Apps	(Gls)
2014–2019	Omonia Aradippou	130	(17)
2019–2021	Enosis Neon Paralimni	60	(13)
2021–2024	APOEL	33	(0)
2023–2024	→ Karmiotissa (loan)	35	(7)
2024–	Anorthosis	40	(3)

International career^{‡}
2019–	Cyprus	1	(0)
- * Club domestic league appearances and goals as of 14 June 2026 ‡ National team caps and goals as of 17:03, 16 November 2019 (UTC)

Dimitris Theodorou (Greek: Δημήτρης Θεοδώρου, born 10 September 1997) is a Cypriot professional footballer who plays as a winger for Cypriot First Division club Anorthosis and the Cyprus national team.

== Club career ==
Theodorou began playing for the first team of Omonia Aradippou in the Cypriot Second Division during the 2014–15 season, before moving to Enosis Neon Paralimni in July 2019. He made his professional debut for Enosis Neon Paralimni in the Cypriot First Division on 26 August 2019, starting in the match against Ethnikos Achna, which finished as a 3–4 home loss.

== International career ==
Theodorou made his international debut for Cyprus on 16 November 2019 in a UEFA Euro 2020 qualifying match against Scotland, which finished as a 1–2 home loss.

== Career statistics ==
=== Club ===
As of 2 October 2025

Club	Season	League			Cup		Continental		Other		Total	
Club	Season	Division	Apps	Goals	Apps	Goals	Apps	Goals	Apps	Goals	Apps	Goals
Enosis Neon Paralimni	2019–20	Cypriot First Division	22	7	2	0	—		—		24	7
Enosis Neon Paralimni	2020–21	Cypriot First Division	38	6	0	0	—		—		38	6
Enosis Neon Paralimni	Total		60	13	2	0	—		—		62	13
APOEL	2021–22	Cypriot First Division	29	0	5	0	—		—		34	0
APOEL	2022–23	Cypriot First Division	3	0	0	0	5	0	—		8	0
APOEL	2023–24	Cypriot First Division	1	0	0	0	1	0	—		2	0
APOEL	Total		33	0	5	0	6	0	—		44	0
Karmiotissa (loan)	2023–24	Cypriot First Division	35	7	1	0	—		—		36	7
Anorthosis	2024–25	Cypriot First Division	26	3	2	0	—		—		28	3
Anorthosis	2025–26	Cypriot First Division	4	0	0	0	—		—		4	0
Anorthosis	Total		30	0	0	0	—		—		32	0
Career total			158	20	8	0	6	0	0	0	174	20

=== International ===
As of 16 November 2019

Cyprus
Year	Apps	Goals
2019	1	0
Total	1	0
