= Ibrahim Koneh =

Cameroonian footballer

Personal information
- Full name: Ibrahim Koneh
- Date of birth: 9 September 1994 (age 32)
- Place of birth: Yaoundé, Cameroon
- Height: 1.84 m (6 ft 0 in)
- Position: Left winger

Team information
- Current team: Ethnikos Achna
- Number: 99

Youth career
- 2015–2018: Boavista

Senior career*
Years	Team	Apps	(Gls)
2014–2015	Oliveira Hospital	17	(7)
2015–2018	Boavista	6	(0)
2018–2019	Estoril	11	(0)
2019–	Ethnikos Achna	37	(6)
- * Club domestic league appearances and goals as of 7 June 2021 (UTC)

Ibrahim Koneh (born 9 September 1994) is a Cameroonian professional footballer who plays as a left winger for Cypriot club Ethnikos Achna.

== Club career ==
Koneh began his career with Portuguese side Boavista.
