= Amine Khammas =

Belgian-born Moroccan footballer

Personal information
- Date of birth: 6 April 1999 (age 27)
- Place of birth: Reet, Belgium
- Height: 1.74 m (5 ft 9 in)
- Position: Left-back

Team information
- Current team: Raja CA
- Number: 24

Youth career
- –2015: JMG Academy Lier
- 2015–2017: Genk

Senior career*
Years	Team	Apps	(Gls)
2017–2020	Genk	13	(0)
2018–2019	→ Den Bosch (loan)	29	(1)
2019–2020	→ Lommel (loan)	20	(0)
2020–2021	Waasland-Beveren	14	(0)
2021–2024	Apollon Limassol	56	(2)
2024–2026	Omonia	46	(0)
2026–	Raja CA	18	(0)

International career
2016	Belgium U17	1	(0)
2017	Morocco U18	2	(0)
- * Club domestic league appearances and goals as of 13 September 2026

Amine Khammas (born 6 April 1999) is a professional footballer who plays as a left-back for Botola club Raja CA.

== Club career ==
Khammas played with JMG Academy Lier and Genk as a junior. He made his first team debut with Genk in the Belgian Pro League on 29 July 2017 against Waasland-Beveren.

== International career ==
Khammas was a youth international for Belgium at the U17 level. He later represented the Morocco U18s in a pair of friendlies against Portugal in January 2017. He received a call-up to the senior Morocco national team in August 2017.

== Career statistics ==
As of 6 July 2025

Appearances and goals by club, season and competition
Club	Season	League			National cup		Continental		Other		Total	
Club	Season	Division	Apps	Goals	Apps	Goals	Apps	Goals	Apps	Goals	Apps	Goals
Genk	2017–18	Belgian First Division A	13	0	2	0	—		—		15	0
Den Bosch (loan)	2018–19	Eerste Divisie	29	1	0	0	—		—		29	1
Lommel (loan)	2019–20	Proximus League	20	0	1	0	—		—		21	0
Waasland-Beveren	2020–21	Belgian First Division A	14	0	0	0	—		—		14	0
Apollon Limassol	2021–22	Cypriot First Division	30	1	3	0	2	0	—		35	1
Apollon Limassol	2022–23	Cypriot First Division	25	1	1	0	10	0	0	0	36	1
Apollon Limassol	2023–24	Cypriot First Division	0	0	0	0	—		—		0	0
Apollon Limassol	Total		55	2	4	0	12	0	0	0	71	2
Omonia	2023–24	Cypriot First Division	10	0	4	0	—		—		14	0
Omonia	2024–25	Cypriot First Division	26	0	2	0	14	1	—		42	1
Omonia	Total		36	0	6	0	14	1	0	0	56	1
Career total			167	3	13	0	26	1	0	0	206	4
