= 2019–20 Cypriot First Division =

Cyta Championship
- Season: 2019–20
- Dates: 23 August 2019 - 11 March 2020 (Remaining matches cancelled)
- Champions: Championship withheld
- Relegated: none
- UEFA Champions League: Omonia
- UEFA Europa League: Anorthosis; APOEL; Apollon Limassol
- Matches: 138
- Goals: 373 (2.7 per match)
- Top goalscorer: Ivan Trichkovski (20 goals)
- Biggest home win: Ethnikos 5–0 Anorthosis (23 February 2020)
- Biggest away win: Doxa 0–6 Anorthosis (27 October 2019)
- Highest scoring: AEK 4–4 Paralimni (27 October 2019)
- Longest winning run: Apollon (6 matches)
- Longest unbeaten run: Anorthosis (11 matches)
- Longest winless run: Ethnikos (11 matches)
- Longest losing run: Doxa; Paralimni (4 matches)
- All statistics correct as of 9 March 2020.

The 2019–20 Cypriot First Division was the 81st season of the Cypriot top-level football league.

On 15 May 2020, the rest of the season was cancelled due to the COVID-19 pandemic. The title was withheld, and no teams were relegated, with the league expanded to 14 teams next season for a transitional year.

== Teams ==
=== Promotion and relegation (pre-season) ===
Alki Oroklini and Ermis Aradippou were relegated at the end of the first-phase of the 2018–19 season after finishing in the bottom two places of the table.

The relegated teams were replaced by 2018–19 Second Division champions Ethnikos Achna and runners-up Olympiakos Nicosia.

=== Stadiums and locations ===
Locations of the 2019–20 Cypriot First Division teams.

Note: Table lists clubs in alphabetical order.

Team	Location	Stadium	Capacity
AEK Larnaca	Larnaca	AEK Arena	7,400
AEL Limassol	Limassol	Tsirio Stadium	13,331
Anorthosis Famagusta	Famagusta	Antonis Papadopoulos Stadium	10,230
APOEL	Nicosia	GSP Stadium	22,859
Apollon Limassol	Limassol	Tsirio Stadium	13,331
Doxa Katokopias	Katokopia, Nicosia	Makario Stadium	16,000
Enosis Neon Paralimni	Paralimni, Famagusta	Tasos Markou Stadium	5,800
Ethnikos Achna	Achna, Famagusta	Dasaki Stadium	7,000
Nea Salamis Famagusta	Famagusta	Ammochostos Stadium	5,500
Olympiakos Nicosia	Nicosia	Makario Stadium	16,000
Omonia	Nicosia	GSP Stadium	22,859
Pafos FC	Paphos	Stelios Kyriakides Stadium	9,394

=== Personnel and kits ===
Note: Flags indicate national team as has been defined under FIFA eligibility rules. Players and Managers may hold more than one non-FIFA nationality.

Team	Head coach	Captain	Kit manufacturer	Shirt sponsor
AEK Larnaca	(Spain) David Caneda	(North Macedonia) Ivan Trichkovski	Puma	Bet on Alfa
AEL Limassol	(Bosnia and Herzegovina) Dušan Kerkez	(Cyprus) Charis Kyriakou	Nike	Burisma Holdings
Anorthosis Famagusta	(Georgia (country)) Temur Ketsbaia	(Croatia) Gordon Schildenfeld	Nike	Stoiximan
APOEL	(Greece) Marinos Ouzounidis	(Cyprus) Georgios Efrem	Macron	Pari-Match
Apollon Limassol	(Cyprus) Sofronis Avgousti	(Cyprus) Giorgos Vasiliou	Puma	Stoiximan
Doxa Katokopias	(Cyprus) Costas Sakkas	(Montenegro) Vladimir Boljević	Nike	Victory Ammunition
EN Paralimni	(North Macedonia) Čedomir Janevski	(Israel) Boris Klaiman	Macron	Paralimni Marina
Ethnikos Achna	(Croatia) Dean Klafurić	(North Macedonia) Martin Bogatinov	Nike	OPAP Cyprus
Nea Salamis Famagusta	(Cyprus) Savvas Poursaitidis	(Brazil) Anderson Correia	Nike	Vitex
Olympiakos Nicosia	(Cyprus) Pambos Christodoulou	(Cyprus) Giorgos Economides	Jako	OPAP Bet
Omonia	(Norway) Henning Berg	(England) Matt Derbyshire	Macron	Fonbet
Pafos FC	(Wales) Cameron Toshack	(Slovakia) Adam Nemec	Macron	Korantina Homes

== Regular season ==
=== League table ===
Pos	Team	Pld	W	D	L	GF	GA	GD	Pts	Qualification or relegation
1	Omonia	22	12	7	3	31	13	+18	43 (Note: Head to head record: Omonia 1–0 Anorthosis, Anorthosis 0–0 Omonia.)	Qualification for the Championship round
2	Anorthosis Famagusta	22	13	4	5	42	21	+21	43	Qualification for the Championship round
3	APOEL	22	11	6	5	35	15	+20	39	Qualification for the Championship round
4	Apollon Limassol	22	12	2	8	38	29	+9	38	Qualification for the Championship round
5	AEK Larnaca	22	9	8	5	36	26	+10	35	Qualification for the Championship round
6	AEL Limassol	22	8	7	7	27	26	+1	31	Qualification for the Championship round
7	Pafos FC	22	8	6	8	26	26	0	30	Qualification for the Relegation round
8	Nea Salamis Famagusta	22	7	4	11	25	36	−11	25	Qualification for the Relegation round
9	Olympiakos Nicosia	22	5	9	8	27	34	−7	24	Qualification for the Relegation round
10	Enosis Neon Paralimni	22	5	7	10	28	42	−14	22	Qualification for the Relegation round
11	Ethnikos Achna	22	5	5	12	29	44	−15	20	Qualification for the Relegation round
12	Doxa Katokopias	22	2	5	15	13	45	−32	11	Qualification for the Relegation round

Source: Cyprus Football Association, Soccerway
Rules for classification: 1) Points; 2) Head-to-head points; 3) Head-to-head goal difference; 4) Head-to-head goals scored; 5) Head-to-head away goals scored (only if two teams); 6) Goal difference; 7) Goals scored; 8) Play-off (only if deciding championship round, relegation round or relegation).

=== Results ===
Home \ Away	AEK	AEL	ANO	APOE	APOL	DOX	ENP	ETH	NSF	OLY	OMO	PAF
AEK Larnaca	—	3–1	1–2	1–0	0–0	2–1	4–4	5–1	0–0	0–0	2–2	1–0
AEL Limassol	1–1	—	0–0	2–1	2–0	1–0	2–0	4–1	1–2	0–0	1–1	2–0
Anorthosis Famagusta	1–2	2–0	—	1–0	3–1	3–0	5–1	2–1	3–2	4–0	0–0	2–0
APOEL	0–0	3–0	0–0	—	4–1	2–0	4–0	2–0	2–1	4–2	0–0	3–0
Apollon Limassol	3–1	1–2	2–0	1–1	—	3–2	0–1	3–2	4–1	3–1	2–1	3–2
Doxa Katokopias	0–1	2–2	0–6	0–3	0–1	—	1–3	1–1	0–0	2–6	0–2	0–4
Enosis Neon Paralimni	2–1	2–2	1–2	2–3	0–3	1–0	—	3–4	0–1	3–0	0–2	1–1
Ethnikos Achna	2–5	0–1	5–0	0–0	1–0	1–1	2–2	—	2–0	0–1	1–2	0–3
Nea Salamis Famagusta	1–0	3–2	2–2	0–3	1–3	0–1	1–1	3–2	—	3–2	0–3	1–2
Olympiakos Nicosia	2–2	1–1	2–1	2–0	0–2	1–1	0–0	4–0	0–3	—	0–2	1–1
Omonia	3–2	1–0	1–0	0–0	1–0	2–0	3–0	1–2	2–0	1–1	—	0–0
Pafos FC	0–2	2–0	0–3	2–0	3–2	0–1	1–1	1–1	1–0	1–1	2–1	—

Source: Cyprus Football Association
Legend: Blue = home team win; Yellow = draw; Red = away team win.

=== Positions by Round ===
The table lists the positions of teams after each week of matches. In order to preserve chronological progress, any postponed matches are not included in the round at which they were originally scheduled, but added to the full round they were played immediately afterwards. For example, if a match is scheduled for matchday 13, but then postponed and played between days 16 and 17, it will be added to the standings for day 16.

Team ╲ Round	1	2	3	4	5	6	7	8	9	10	11	12	13	14	15	16	17	18	19	20	21	22
Omonia	1	1	1	2	2	2	3	2	2	2	2	2	1	1	2	2	2	2	2	2	2	1
Anorthosis Famagusta	4	8	3	1	1	1	1	1	1	1	1	1	2	2	1	1	1	1	1	1	1	2
APOEL	7	9	8	6	8	5	2	4	4	3	3	4	4	5	3	4	4	3	3	3	3	3
Apollon Limassol	8	10	6	7	5	8	9	7	7	6	5	3	3	3	4	3	3	4	4	4	4	4
AEK Larnaca	6	3	4	5	3	3	4	5	3	4	6	6	6	6	7	7	5	6	5	5	5	5
AEL Limassol	5	2	2	3	4	7	5	3	5	5	4	5	5	4	5	6	7	5	6	6	6	6
Pafos FC	3	5	7	8	7	9	8	9	9	9	10	9	10	10	10	10	10	9	8	7	7	7
Nea Salamis Famagusta	11	12	9	9	9	6	7	8	8	7	7	7	8	7	6	5	6	7	7	8	8	8
Olympiakos Nicosia	9	7	11	11	12	11	11	11	10	10	9	8	7	8	8	8	8	8	9	9	9	9
Enosis Neon Paralimni	10	11	12	12	10	10	10	10	11	11	11	11	11	11	11	11	11	10	10	10	10	10
Ethnikos Achna	2	4	5	4	6	4	6	6	6	8	8	10	9	9	9	9	9	11	11	11	11	11
Doxa Katokopias	12	6	10	10	11	12	12	12	12	12	12	12	12	12	12	12	12	12	12	12	12	12

Qualification to Championship round
Qualification to Relegation round

== Championship round ==
=== Championship round table ===
Pos	Team	Pld	W	D	L	GF	GA	GD	Pts	Qualification
1	Omonia (Q)	23	13	7	3	34	13	+21	46 (Note: Head to head record: Omonia 1–0 Anorthosis, Anorthosis 0–0 Omonia.)	Qualification for the Champions League first qualifying round
2	Anorthosis Famagusta (Q)	23	14	4	5	45	21	+24	46	Qualification for the Europa League third qualifying round
3	APOEL (Q)	23	11	7	5	36	16	+20	40	Qualification for the Europa League first qualifying round
4	Apollon Limassol (Q)	23	12	3	8	39	30	+9	39	Qualification for the Europa League first qualifying round
5	AEK Larnaca	23	9	8	6	36	29	+7	35	
6	AEL Limassol	23	8	7	8	27	29	−2	31	

Updated to match(es) played on 8 March 2020. Source: CFA (in Greek)
Rules for classification: 1) Points; 2) Head-to-head points; 3) Head-to-head goal difference; 4) Head-to-head goals scored; 5) Head-to-head away goals scored (only if two teams); 6) Goal difference; 7) Goals scored; 8) Play-off (only if deciding champion or UEFA competitions).
(Q) Qualified for the phase indicated

=== Results ===
Home \ Away	AEK	AEL	ANO	APOE	APOL	OMO
AEK Larnaca	—	—	—	—	—	—
AEL Limassol	—	—	—	—	—	0–3
Anorthosis Famagusta	3–0	—	—	—	—	—
APOEL	—	—	—	—	—	—
Apollon Limassol	—	—	—	1–1	—	—
Omonia Nicosia	—	—	—	—	—	—

Updated to match(es) played on 8 March 2020. Source: Cyprus Football Association
Legend: Blue = home team win; Yellow = draw; Red = away team win.
For upcoming matches, an "a" indicates there is an article about the rivalry between the two participants.

=== Positions by Round ===
The table lists the positions of teams after each week of matches.

Team ╲ Round	23
Omonia	1
Anorthosis	2
APOEL	3
Apollon	4
AEK Larnaca	5
AEL Limassol	6

Qualification to Champions League first qualifying round
Qualification to Europa League first qualifying round

Updated to match(es) played on 8 March 2020. Source:

== Relegation round ==
=== Relegation round table ===
Pos	Team	Pld	W	D	L	GF	GA	GD	Pts
7	Pafos FC	23	8	6	9	26	28	−2	30
8	Nea Salamis Famagusta	23	7	5	11	27	38	−11	26
9	Olympiakos Nicosia	23	5	10	8	28	35	−7	25
10	Enosis Neon Paralimni	23	5	8	10	29	43	−14	23
11	Ethnikos Achna	23	5	6	12	31	46	−15	21
12	Doxa Katokopias	23	3	5	15	15	45	−30	14

Rules for classification: 1) Points; 2) Head-to-head points; 3) Head-to-head goal difference; 4) Head-to-head goals scored; 5) Head-to-head away goals scored (only if two teams); 6) Goal difference; 7) Goals scored; 8) Play-off (only if deciding champion or UEFA competitions).

=== Results ===
Home \ Away	DOX	ENP	ETH	NSF	OLY	PAF
Doxa Katokopias	—	—	—	—	—	2–0
Enosis Neon Paralimni	—	—	—	—	1–1	—
Ethnikos Achna	—	—	—	—	—	—
Nea Salamis Famagusta	—	—	2–2	—	—	—
Olympiakos Nicosia	—	—	—	—	—	—
Pafos FC	—	—	—	—	—	—

Updated to match(es) played on 9 March 2020. Source: Cyprus Football Association, Soccerway
Legend: Blue = home team win; Yellow = draw; Red = away team win.
For upcoming matches, an "a" indicates there is an article about the rivalry between the two participants.

=== Positions by Round ===
The table lists the positions of teams after each week of matches.

Team ╲ Round	23
Pafos	7
Nea Salamis	8
Olympiakos Nicosia	9
EN Paralimni	10
Ethnikos Achna	11
Doxa Katokopias	12

== Season statistics ==
=== Top scorers ===
As of 7 March 2020.

Rank	Player	Club	Goals
1	(North Macedonia) Ivan Trichkovski	AEK Larnaca	20
2	(Nigeria) Kingsley Onuegbu	Nea Salamis Famagusta	14
2	(Spain) Rayo	Anorthosis Famagusta	14
4	(England) Matt Derbyshire	Omonia	13
5	(Argentina) Emilio Zelaya	Apollon Limassol	8
6	(Togo) Serge Gakpé	Apollon Limassol	6
6	(Sweden) Linus Hallenius	APOEL	6
6	(Georgia (country)) Nika Katcharava	Anorthosis Famagusta	6
6	(Cameroon) Ibrahim Koneh	Ethnikos Achna	6
6	(Cyprus) Giorgos Merkis	APOEL	6
6	(Cyprus) Demetris Theodorou	Enosis Neon Paralimni	6
