= List of Cypriot football transfers summer 2017 =

This is a list of Cypriot football transfers for the 2017–18 summer transfer window by club. Only transfers of clubs in the Cypriot First Division and Cypriot Second Division are included.

== Cypriot First Division ==
Note: Flags indicate national team as has been defined under FIFA eligibility rules. Players may hold more than one non-FIFA nationality.

=== AEK Larnaca ===
In:

| No. | Pos. | Nation | Player |
|---|---|---|---|
| 2 | DF | ESP | Carles Soria (from (Spain) Espanyol B) |
| 3 | DF | CYP | Marios Antoniades (from (Greece) Panionios) |
| 21 | FW | CYP | Nikos Englezou (loan return from Nea Salamina) |
| 25 | FW | CYP | Nestoras Mitidis (from (Netherlands) Roda JC Kerkrade, previously on loan) |
| 26 | DF | CYP | Rafael Anastasiou (from APOEL) |
| 80 | FW | CYP | Onisiforos Roushias (from Omonia) |
| 16 | MF | ESP | Nacho Cases (from (Spain) Sporting Gijón) |
| 32 | DF | POR | Nélson (from (Spain) Alcorcón) |
| 36 | DF | SRB | Radovan Pankov (on loan from (Russia) Ural Yekaterinburg) |

Out:

| No. | Pos. | Nation | Player |
|---|---|---|---|
| 1 | GK | POL | Mateusz Taudul (released) |
| 15 | GK | ESP | Rubén Miño (released) |
| 17 | MF | ESP | Juanma Ortiz (released) |
| 19 | DF | ESP | Javier Garrido (released) |
| 24 | DF | CYP | Thomas Ioannou (on loan to Doxa Katokopias) |
| 27 | MF | CYP | Michalis Music (on loan to Ethnikos Achnas) |
| 33 | DF | CYP | Elias Charalambous (retired) |
| 77 | DF | CYP | Constantinos Mintikkis (on loan to Nea Salamina) |
| 31 | FW | CYP | Konstantinos Konstantinou (on loan to Ethnikos Achnas) |
| 26 | DF | CYP | Rafael Anastasiou (on loan to Anagennisi Deryneia) |

=== AEL Limassol ===
In:

| No. | Pos. | Nation | Player |
|---|---|---|---|
| 1 | GK | CPV | Vozinha (from (Portugal) Gil Vicente) |
| 4 | DF | POR | André Teixeira (from (Portugal) Leixões) |
| 6 | MF | POR | Leandro Silva (from (Portugal) Porto B) |
| 7 | DF | CYP | Andreas Avraam (from (Greece) AEL) |
| 8 | MF | NGA | Fidelis Irhene (from (Portugal) Porto B) |
| 9 | FW | BRA | Tiago Leonço (from (Denmark) Vendsyssel) |
| 31 | FW | GNB | Aldair (from (Portugal) Olhanense) |
| 42 | DF | CYP | Christos Wheeler (from Apollon Limassol) |
| 71 | FW | ESP | Dani Benitez (from (Spain) Racing Ferrol) |
| 94 | MF | BRA | Arthur (from (Portugal) Gil Vicente) |
| 98 | MF | MKD | Davor Zdravkovski (from (North Macedonia) Makedonija) |

Out:

| No. | Pos. | Nation | Player |
|---|---|---|---|
| 1 | GK | VEN | Rafael Romo (to APOEL) |
| 8 | MF | BRA | Lucas Souza (to APOEL) |
| 10 | MF | CIV | Aly Savané (released) |
| 25 | DF | POR | Núrio Fortuna (loan return to (Portugal) Braga B) |
| 23 | MF | CYP | Andreas Neofytou (on loan to Karmiotissa) |
| 31 | GK | CYP | Andreas Kittos (to Ayia Napa) |
| 33 | DF | CYP | Sotiris Vasiliou (on loan to Karmiotissa) |
| 45 | DF | CYP | Andreas Kyriakou (on loan to Aris Limassol) |
| 66 | DF | CYP | Konstantinos Kyriakou (on loan to Ethnikos Assia) |
| 70 | MF | CYP | Stylianos Panteli (on loan to Olympiakos Nicosia) |
| 77 | FW | ESP | Piti (to (Greece) Lamia) |
| 87 | FW | GRE | Giorgos Georgiadis (released) |
| 90 | FW | ESP | Alain Eizmendi (to (Spain) Racing Ferrol) |

=== Alki Oroklini ===
In:

| No. | Pos. | Nation | Player |
|---|---|---|---|
| 20 | MF | FRA | Chafik Tigroudja (from (France) Les Herbiers) |
| 78 | DF | FRA | Abdelaye Diakité (from (Italy) Siracusa) |
| — | GK | VEN | Rafael Quiñónes (from Ormideia) |
| 28 | MF | FRA | Jean-Baptiste Pierazzi (from (France) Paris) |
| — | FW | ROU | Adrian Pătulea (from Pafos FC) |
| 77 | FW | ALG | Bilal Hamdi (from (France) Sedan) |
| 23 | FW | BUL | Radoslav Vasilev (from (Bulgaria) Septemvri Sofia) |
| 24 | DF | CYP | Panayiotis Loizides (from Omonia Aradippou) |
| 88 | MF | CYP | Andreas Hapeshis (from APOEL U21) |
| 19 | FW | GUI | Alpha Toure |
| 33 | DF | GRE | Kyriakos Aretas (from APOEL) |
| 79 | GK | CYP | Giorgos Tasouris (from Ethnikos Assia) |
| — | MF | CYP | Petros Psychas |
| — | MF | CYP | Marios Andreou |
| 18 | DF | CYP | Marios Koshias |
| 22 | DF | CGO | Bernard Itoua (from (Romania) Gaz Metan Mediaș) |
| 30 | FW | BRA | Fabrício (from (Angola) C.R.D. Libolo) |
| 39 | MF | CYP | Christos Kallis (from APOEL, previously on loan) |
| — | MF | CMR | Gilles Ngomo (from (Iraq) Al-Quwa Al-Jawiya) |
| — | GK | BEL | Urko Pardo (from APOEL) |

Out:

| No. | Pos. | Nation | Player |
|---|---|---|---|
| 7 | MF | CYP | Andreas Sofokleous (loan return to Omonia) |
| 18 | MF | CYP | Demetris Christaki (to ASIL) |
| 20 | FW | CYP | Andreas Papathanasiou (to Onisilos Sotira) |
| 25 | FW | FRA | Romain Davigny (released) |
| 39 | DF | CYP | Christos Kallis (loan return to APOEL) |
| 92 | DF | FRA | Johan Letzelter (released) |
| 37 | GK | LTU | Martynas Matijoska (released) |
| 8 | MF | ESP | Pablo Suarez (released) |
| 26 | DF | GRE | Stavros Nicolaou (ASIL) |

=== Anorthosis Famagusta ===
In:

| No. | Pos. | Nation | Player |
|---|---|---|---|
| 11 | DF | BUL | Ivan Bandalovski (from (Bulgaria) Vereya) |
| 4 | DF | CYP | Panayiotis Artymatas (from (England) West Bromwich Albion) |
| 20 | FW | GUI | Demba Camara (from (France) Paris) |
| 21 | MF | AZE | Araz Abdullayev (on loan from (Azerbaijan) Gabala) |
| 40 | MF | CYP | Nikolas Mattheou (on loan from (Greece) PAOK) |
| 17 | MF | ESP | Miguel Palanca (from (Poland) Korona Kielce) |
| 1 | GK | ISR | Ariel Harush (from (Israel) Hapoel Tel Aviv) |
| 5 | DF | CRO | Gordon Schildenfeld (from (Croatia) Dinamo Zagreb) |
| 88 | DF | BRA | Douglão (free agent) |
| 32 | MF | CRO | Danijel Pranjić (from (Slovenia) Koper) |
| 45 | MF | BUL | Vladimir Gadzhev (from (England) Coventry City) |

Out:

| No. | Pos. | Nation | Player |
|---|---|---|---|
| 2 | DF | BRA | Gabriel (released) |
| 4 | MF | POR | Pelé (released) |
| 6 | MF | POR | Filipe Oliveira (released) |
| 9 | FW | ESP | Airam (to (Spain) Extremadura UD) |
| 17 | DF | ESP | Iñigo Calderón (to (India) Chennaiyin FC) |
| 22 | MF | ESP | Alberto (to (Spain) FC Cartagena) |
| 31 | DF | GRE | Dimitris Giannoulis (loan return to (Greece) PAOK) |
| 33 | DF | BRA | Guilherme Santos (to (Brazil) Fortaleza) |
| 88 | GK | SVN | Jan Koprivec (to Pafos) |
| 97 | GK | GRE | Dimitris Katsimitros (released) |

=== APOEL ===
In:

| No. | Pos. | Nation | Player |
|---|---|---|---|
| 1 | GK | MEX | Raúl Gudiño (on loan from (Portugal) Porto B) |
| 2 | DF | CYP | Kypros Christoforou (from Aris Limassol, previously on loan) |
| 5 | DF | ESP | Jesús Rueda (from (Israel) Beitar Jerusalem) |
| 8 | FW | BEN | Mickaël Poté (from (Turkey) Adana Demirspor) |
| 13 | GK | ESP | Nauzet Pérez (from (Spain) Osasuna) |
| 14 | MF | AUS | Tommy Oar (from (Australia) Brisbane Roar) |
| 17 | MF | NOR | Ghayas Zahid (from (Norway) Vålerenga) |
| 20 | MF | HUN | Roland Sallai (from (Hungary) Puskás Akadémia) |
| 22 | FW | CYP | Minas Antoniou (from Aris Limassol) |
| 25 | MF | ARG | Agustín Farías (from (Chile) Palestino) |
| 29 | DF | GRE | Praxitelis Vouros (from (Greece) Olympiacos) |
| 30 | GK | VEN | Rafael Romo (from AEL Limassol) |
| 33 | FW | CYP | Andreas Makris (from (England) Walsall) |
| 50 | DF | BRA | Carlão (on loan from (Italy) Torino) |
| 88 | MF | BRA | Lucas Souza (from AEL Limassol) |
| 93 | GK | CYP | Neofytos Michael (from Nea Salamina) |

Out:

| No. | Pos. | Nation | Player |
|---|---|---|---|
| 4 | MF | CYP | Kostakis Artymatas (on loan to (Greece) Kerkyra) |
| 17 | FW | ESP | David Barral (to (Spain) Cádiz CF) |
| 20 | FW | CYP | Pieros Sotiriou (to (Denmark) Copenhagen) |
| 23 | DF | ESP | Iñaki Astiz (to (Poland) Legia Warsaw) |
| 25 | DF | CYP | Rafael Anastasiou (to AEK Larnaca) |
| 30 | GK | VEN | Rafael Romo (on loan to (Belgium) Beerschot Wilrijk) |
| 33 | DF | GRE | Kyriakos Aretas (to Alki Oroklini) |
| 45 | MF | CYP | Georgios Christodoulou (on loan to Pafos) |
| 55 | MF | CYP | Christos Kallis (to Alki Oroklini, previously on loan) |
| 70 | MF | GRE | Giannis Gianniotas (loan return to (Greece) Olympiacos) |
| 77 | MF | BRA | Vander Vieira (to (United Arab Emirates) Sharjah FC) |
| 78 | GK | ESP | Urko Pardo (to Alki Oroklini) |
| 80 | MF | COL | Roger Cañas (loan return to (Kazakhstan) Astana) |
| 90 | DF | CTA | Cédric Yambéré (loan return to (France) Bordeaux) |
| 93 | GK | CYP | Neofytos Michael (on loan to Aris Limassol) |

=== Apollon Limassol ===
In:

| No. | Pos. | Nation | Player |
|---|---|---|---|
| 8 | MF | CHI | Jason Silva (from (Chile) Palestino) |
| 11 | FW | ARG | Emilio Zelaya (from Ethnikos Achna) |
| 21 | DF | BRA | Jander (from (Portugal) Moreirense) |
| 23 | MF | CYP | Matija Špoljarić (from (Spain) Atlético 'Juvenil') |
| 30 | FW | MLT | André Schembri (from (Portugal) Boavista) |
| 33 | FW | CYP | Ioannis Chadjivasilis (from Ethnikos Achna) |
| 44 | DF | ESP | Héctor Yuste (from (Spain) Mallorca) |
| 92 | MF | CRO | Antonio Jakoliš (on loan from (Romania) Steaua București) |
| 95 | MF | BRA | Alef (on loan from (Portugal) Braga B) |
| 96 | MF | BEL | Luca Polizzi (from (Croatia) Inter Zaprešić) |
| -- | DF | ROU | Andrei Pițian (on loan from (Romania) Astra Giurgiu) |
| -- | MF | URU | Agustín Cedrés (from (Belgium) Mouscron) |
| -- | MF | BRA | Allan (on loan from (England) Liverpool) |
| -- | MF | ARG | Nicolás Martínez (on loan from (Greece) Olympiacos) |

Out:

| No. | Pos. | Nation | Player |
|---|---|---|---|
| 6 | DF | CYP | Andreas Karo (on loan to Nea Salamina) |
| 8 | DF | POR | Mário Sérgio (to (Portugal) Varzim) |
| 12 | DF | BRA | Dudu Paraíba (released) |
| 18 | FW | POL | Arkadiusz Piech (to (Poland) Śląsk Wrocław) |
| 19 | FW | CIV | Abraham Gneki Guié (to (France) Orléans) |
| 25 | MF | CYP | Chambos Kyriakou (on loan to (Portugal) Estoril) |
| 30 | DF | POR | Tiago Gomes (loan return to (Portugal) Braga) |
| 31 | GK | CYP | Michalis Fani (retired) |
| 33 | DF | CYP | Giorgos Pelagias (released) |
| 42 | DF | CYP | Christos Wheeler (to AEL Limassol) |
| 53 | FW | CYP | Theodoros Iosifides (to (Spain) Fuenlabrada) |
| 55 | DF | BRA | Paulo Vinícius (to (Romania) CFR Cluj) |
| 66 | MF | CPV | Sérgio Semedo (released) |

=== Aris Limassol ===
In:

| No. | Pos. | Nation | Player |
|---|---|---|---|
| — | FW | SVN | David Poljanec (from Karmiotissa) |
| — | MF | CYP | Evgenios Kyriakou (from Karmiotissa) |
| — | DF | GRE | Thanasis Moulopoulos (from (Greece) Levadiakos) |
| — | GK | CYP | Neofytos Michael (on loan from APOEL) |
| — | MF | CYP | Georgios Christodoulou (on loan from APOEL) |
| — | MF | ROU | Bănel Nicoliță (from (Romania) Târgu Mureș) |
| — | DF | BRA | João Leonardo (from Doxa Katokopias) |
| — | GK | MKD | Edin Nuredinoski (from Ermis Aradippou) |
| — | DF | BRA | João Paulo (from (Mexico) Juárez) |
| — | MF | GER | Christian Müller (from (Germany) Preußen Münster) |
| — | DF | MKD | Vlatko Drobarov (from (Armenia) Banants) |
| — | MF | CMR | Evariste Ngolok (from (Belgium) Lokeren) |

Out:

| No. | Pos. | Nation | Player |
|---|---|---|---|
| — | DF | CYP | Kypros Christoforou (to APOEL, previously on loan) |
| 22 | FW | CYP | Minas Antoniou (to APOEL) |
| 28 | MF | CYP | Kyriacos Pavlou (to Enosis Neon Paralimni) |
| 31 | GK | GRE | Nikos Giannakopoulos (loan return to (Greece) Panathinaikos) |
| 32 | MF | CYP | Evangelos Kyriacou (to Enosis Neon Paralimni) |
| 92 | DF | SWE | Rasmus Sjöstedt (to (Israel) Hapoel Haifa) |
| 99 | FW | ARG | Silvio González (to AEZ Zakakiou) |

=== Doxa Katokopias ===
In:

| No. | Pos. | Nation | Player |
|---|---|---|---|
| 1 | GK | AUT | Armin Gremsl (from (Austria) SV Horn) |
| 3 | MF | CIV | Ibrahim Sissoko (free agent) |
| 4 | DF | FRA | Lamine Ba (from (Italy) Virtus Entella) |
| 5 | DF | CYP | Stefanos Mouktaris (from (Greece) Panionios) |
| 9 | FW | FRA | Rahavi Kifouéti (from (Bulgaria) Lokomotiv GO) |
| 10 | MF | CYP | Vasilios Papafotis (on loan from (Cyprus) APOEL FC) |
| 16 | DF | BRA | Leandro Pinto (from (Greece) Trikala) |
| 20 | FW | CYP | Charalampos Mouzouros (from Anorthosis Famagusta U21) |
| 21 | MF | AUT | Nils Zatl (from (Austria) SV Horn) |
| 22 | DF | CYP | Andys Nikolaou (from Pafos FC) |
| 77 | MF | CYP | Andreas Komodikis (free agent) |

Out:

| No. | Pos. | Nation | Player |
|---|---|---|---|
| 13 | DF | POR | Carlos Marques (to Digenis Akritas Morphou) |
| 19 | DF | BRA | Edmar (to Karmiotissa) |
| 20 | DF | GRE | Kyriakos Aretas (loan return to APOEL) |
| 23 | FW | ESP | Ferran Corominas (to (India) FC Goa) |
| 25 | DF | BRA | João Leonardo (to Aris Limassol) |
| 26 | MF | CIV | Gaossou Fofana (to Ermis Aradippou) |
| 33 | DF | ESP | Albert Serrán (to (Albania) FK Kukësi) |
| 93 | MF | FRA | Hérold Goulon (to Pafos) |
| 94 | GK | CYP | Andreas Efstathiou (to P.O. Xylotymbou) |

=== Ermis Aradippou ===
In:

| No. | Pos. | Nation | Player |
|---|---|---|---|
| 1 | GK | UKR | Andriy Novak (from (Ukraine) Oleksandriya) |
| 2 | DF | GRE | Dimitrios Sandravelis (from (Greece) Trikala) |
| 4 | DF | UKR | Maksym Imerekov (from (Belarus) Torpedo Zhodino) |
| 5 | MF | GHA | Emmanuel Frimpong (from (Sweden) AFC Eskilstuna) |
| 6 | MF | GRE | Giannis Taralidis (from Karmiotissa) |
| 7 | MF | RUS | Pavel Ignatovich (from (Russia) Mordovia Saransk) |
| 9 | FW | SUI | Innocent Emeghara (free agent) |
| 10 | FW | CGO | Juvhel Tsoumou (from (Germany) Wacker Burghausen) |
| 11 | FW | CYP | Alex Konstantinou (from Nea Salamina) |
| 12 | MF | CYP | Charalambos Aristotelous (from Anorthosis Famagusta) |
| 16 | MF | ROU | Radu Zaharia (from (Romania) Gaz Metan Mediaș) |
| 19 | MF | MEX | Édgar Pacheco (from (Bahrain) Al-Najma) |
| 20 | DF | POR | China (from Nea Salamina) |
| 23 | MF | CYP | Zacharias Theodorou (from Ayia Napa) |
| 27 | MF | LBR | Theo Weeks (loan return from (Azerbaijan) Gabala) |
| 28 | MF | CIV | Gaossou Fofana (from Doxa Katokopias) |
| 60 | MF | CYP | Loizos Pounnas (from Anorthosis Famagusta) |

Out:

| No. | Pos. | Nation | Player |
|---|---|---|---|
| 4 | DF | ROU | Alexandru Benga (to (Romania) Juventus București) |
| 5 | DF | CYP | Fotis Kezos (released) |
| 6 | DF | ESP | Alfonso Artabe (to (Vietnam) HK Pegasus) |
| 7 | MF | BRA | Ibson (to (Portugal) Maritimo) |
| 11 | MF | BUL | Yordan Hristov (released) |
| 12 | MF | FRA | Elliot Grandin (released) |
| 13 | DF | CPV | Paulo Pina (released) |
| 14 | MF | BEL | Emmerik De Vriese (to ASIL) |
| 15 | GK | MKD | Edin Nuredinoski (to Aris Limassol) |
| 18 | MF | GEO | Irakli Maisuradze (to (Greece) Panionios) |
| 23 | MF | ESP | Carles Coto (to (Spain) Rayo Majadahonda) |
| 26 | DF | CYP | Ioannis Antoniou (to Enosis Neon Paralimni) |
| 28 | MF | CIV | Gaossou Fofana (to Othellos Athienou) |
| 29 | FW | MTN | Dominique Da Sylva (to (Vietnam) Ho Chi Minh City FC) |
| 37 | FW | ZIM | Edward Mashinya (released) |
| 50 | GK | CYP | Demetris Stylianou (to Nea Salamina) |
| 90 | GK | CYP | Andreas Vassiliou (to Pafos FC) |

=== Ethnikos Achna ===
In:

| No. | Pos. | Nation | Player |

Out:

| No. | Pos. | Nation | Player |
|---|---|---|---|
| 9 | FW | GEO | Nika Kacharava (loan return to (Russia) Rostov) |
| 19 | FW | CYP | Ioannis Chadjivasilis (to Apollon Limassol) |
| 23 | GK | CYP | Zannetos Mytidis (to THOI Lakatamia) |
| 66 | DF | BUL | Plamen Krachunov (to Sandecja Nowy Sącz) |
| 99 | FW | ARG | Emilio Zelaya (to Apollon Limassol) |

=== Nea Salamina ===
In:

| No. | Pos. | Nation | Player |
|---|---|---|---|
| 3 | DF | ARM | Taron Voskanyan (from Karmiotissa) |
| 6 | DF | CYP | Andreas Karo (on loan from Apollon Limassol) |
| 7 | MF | POR | Hélio Roque (from (Angola) Libolo) |
| 10 | FW | ARG | Gastón Sangoy (free agent) |
| 11 | FW | CYP | Andreas Kyprianou (from Anagennisi Deryneia) |
| 18 | MF | CIV | Joël Damahou (from (Greece) Trikala) |
| 19 | MF | GRE | Yiannis Papadopoulos (from (Greece) Veria) |
| 20 | MF | ARM | David Manoyan (from Karmiotissa) |
| 32 | GK | CYP | Demetris Stylianou (from Ermis Aradippou) |
| 77 | DF | CYP | Constantinos Mintikkis (on loan from AEK Larnaca) |
| 91 | DF | BRA | Anderson Correia (from (Portugal) Boavista) |
| 92 | DF | GRE | Nikos Lougkos (free agent) |
| 97 | MF | GRE | Giorgos Kakko (on loan from (Greece) PAOK) |

Out:

| No. | Pos. | Nation | Player |
|---|---|---|---|
| 5 | MF | BRA | Dudú (loan return to (Greece) Asteras Tripolis) |
| 15 | DF | ARG | Emiliano Fusco (retired) |
| 16 | FW | NED | Nassir Maachi (to (Greece) Apollon Smyrnis) |
| 17 | DF | SRB | Goran Antonic (to (Norway) Elverum Fotball) |
| 20 | MF | GRE | Giannis Skopelitis (to (Greece) Egaleo) |
| 23 | MF | GRE | Savvas Tsabouris (to (Greece) Levadiakos) |
| 29 | FW | CYP | Georgios Kolokoudias (to Enosis Neon Paralimni) |
| 30 | MF | CYP | Nikos Englezou (loan return to AEK Larnaca) |
| 77 | GK | CYP | Stylianos Konstantinou (to Olympiakos Nicosia) |
| 82 | DF | POR | China (to Ermis Aradippou) |
| 93 | GK | CYP | Neofytos Michael (to APOEL) |

=== Olympiakos Nicosia ===
In:

| No. | Pos. | Nation | Player |
|---|---|---|---|
| 77 | GK | CYP | Stylianos Konstantinou (from Nea Salamina) |
| 21 | MF | CYP | Stylianos Panteli (on loan from AEL Limassol) |

Out:

| No. | Pos. | Nation | Player |

=== Omonia ===
In:

| No. | Pos. | Nation | Player |
|---|---|---|---|
| 4 | DF | CPV | Kay (from (Romania) CSU Craiova) |
| 5 | DF | BRA | Fabrício (from (Israel) Ashdod) |
| 6 | DF | BRA | William Soares (from (Israel) Hapoel Be'er Sheva) |
| 8 | MF | POR | Alex Soares (from (Portugal) Marítimo) |
| 10 | MF | BRA | Kanu (free agent) |
| 11 | FW | ARG | Leandro González (from (Argentina) Atlético Tucumán) |
| 13 | DF | BRA | Jaílson (from (Brazil) Anápolis) |
| 14 | MF | CUW | Jarchinio Antonia (from (Netherlands) Go Ahead Eagles) |
| 21 | FW | POR | Rafael Lopes (from (Portugal) Chaves) |
| 22 | GK | NED | Piet Velthuizen (from (Israel) Hapoel Haifa) |
| 23 | MF | NED | Hedwiges Maduro (from (Netherlands) Groningen) |
| 24 | DF | GNB | Mamadu Candé (free agent) |
| 32 | DF | ESP | Borja Ekiza (from (Ukraine) Zirka Kropyvnytskyi) |

Out:

| No. | Pos. | Nation | Player |
|---|---|---|---|
| 2 | DF | BRA | Bruno Nascimento (to (Portugal) Feirense) |
| 3 | DF | GRE | Aristidis Soiledis (to (Greece) Kerkyra) |
| 5 | DF | GRE | Thanasis Panteliadis (to (Greece) Lamia) |
| 8 | FW | CYP | Onisiforos Roushias (to AEK Larnaca) |
| 10 | MF | BRA | Cleyton (to (Turkey) Elazığspor) |
| 13 | GK | GRE | Konstantinos Kotsaris (loan return to (Greece) Panathinaikos) |
| 16 | MF | GRE | Dimosthenis Chantzaras (released) |
| 18 | GK | CRO | Dario Krešić (released) |
| 20 | MF | CYP | Gerasimos Fylaktou (on loan to Pafos) |
| 21 | DF | ISL | Kári Árnason (to (Scotland) Aberdeen) |
| 22 | DF | GRE | Dimitris Konstantinidis (loan return to (Greece) PAOK) |
| 23 | DF | CPV | Carlitos (released) |
| 40 | MF | ROU | George Florescu (released) |

=== Pafos ===
In:

| No. | Pos. | Nation | Player |
|---|---|---|---|
| — | FW | SVN | Mitja Lotrič (from (Slovenia) Rudar Velenje) |
| — | MF | UKR | Artem Filimonov (on loan from (Ukraine) Karpaty Lviv) |
| — | GK | SVN | Aljaž Ivačič (from (Slovenia) Radomlje) |
| — | DF | FRA | Yvan Erichot (from (England) Leyton Orient) |
| — | MF | CYP | Rafael Yiangoudakis (from (Greece) Kallithea) |
| — | DF | BIH | Kenan Horić (from (Turkey) Antalyaspor) |
| — | MF | FRA | Hérold Goulon (from Doxa Katokopias) |
| — | GK | CYP | Andreas Vasiliou (from Elpida Xylofagou) |
| — | DF | LVA | Vladislavs Gabovs (from (Poland) Korona Kielce) |
| — | DF | LVA | Antonijs Černomordijs (from (Latvia) Riga) |
| — | GK | SVN | Jan Koprivec (from Anorthosis Famagusta) |
| — | MF | CYP | Gerasimos Fylaktou (on loan from Omonia) |

Out:

| No. | Pos. | Nation | Player |
|---|---|---|---|
| 9 | FW | ROU | Adrian Pătulea (to Alki Oroklini) |
| 10 | MF | POR | Hugo Moutinho (to Akritas Chlorakas) |
| 22 | DF | CYP | Andys Nikolaou (to Doxa Katokopias) |
| 33 | MF | CYP | Valentinos Pastellis (to Karmiotissa) |
| 89 | DF | CYP | Pantelis Pitsillos (to Karmiotissa) |

== Cypriot Second Division ==
=== AEZ Zakakiou ===
In:

| No. | Pos. | Nation | Player |
|---|---|---|---|
| — | DF | CYP | Christos Demetriades (from ENY Digenis Ipsona) |
| — | MF | CYP | Michalis Polidorou (from ENY Digenis Ipsona) |
| — | FW | CYP | Stefanos Volos (from Enosis Neon Parekklisia) |
| — | FW | CYP | Valentinos Aristeidou (from Amathus Ayiou Tychona) |
| — | DF | CYP | Rafael Kourtellos (from Akritas Chlorakas) |
| — | FW | ARG | Silvio González (from Aris Limassol) |
| — | DF | CYP | Charalampos Evripidou (from APOEL U21) |
| — | GK | GRE | Stelios Tentonis (from APEP) |

Out:

| No. | Pos. | Nation | Player |
|---|---|---|---|
| 5 | MF | MWI | Tawonga Chimodzi (to (Greece) Sparti) |
| 6 | MF | CYP | Sergios Panayiotou (to PAEEK) |
| 32 | MF | CYP | Antonis Katsis (to Othellos Athienou) |
| 88 | MF | CIV | Félicien Gbedinyessi (to Ermis Aradippou) |
| 99 | FW | CYP | Kristis Andreou (from AEZ Zakakiou) |

=== Anagennisi Deryneia ===
In:

| No. | Pos. | Nation | Player |
|---|---|---|---|
| — | FW | POR | Wesllem (from (Poland) Olimpia Grudziądz) |
| — | DF | ENG | Michael Felgate (from Enosis Neon Paralimni) |
| 4 | DF | BEL | Pieter Mbemba (from Akritas Chlorakas) |
| 38 | FW | FRA | Papa Ibou Kébé (from (France) Le Mans) |

Out:

| No. | Pos. | Nation | Player |
|---|---|---|---|
| 9 | FW | CYP | Andreas Kyprianou (to Nea Salamina) |
| 25 | DF | CYP | Rafael Anastasiou (loan return to APOEL) |
| 45 | MF | CYP | Georgios Christodoulou (loan return to APOEL) |

=== ASIL ===
In:

| No. | Pos. | Nation | Player |
|---|---|---|---|
| — | GK | CYP | Gavriel Constantinou (from Othellos Athienou) |
| — | DF | VEN | Andrés Rouga (from Ayia Napa) |
| — | DF | GHA | Livingstone Adjin (from Othellos Athienou) |
| — | FW | CYP | Nicos Panayides (from Ayia Napa) |
| — | MF | CYP | Demetris Christaki (from Alki Oroklini) |
| 99 | MF | VEN | Héctor González (from P.O. Xylotymbou) |

Out:

| No. | Pos. | Nation | Player |
|---|---|---|---|
| — | DF | CYP | Andreas Antoniou (to THOI Lakatamia) |

=== Ayia Napa ===
In:

| No. | Pos. | Nation | Player |
|---|---|---|---|
| 1 | GK | CYP | Andreas Kittos (from AEL Limassol) |
| 5 | MF | CYP | Paris Panayiotou (from Nikos & Sokratis Erimis) |
| 10 | FW | CYP | Alekos Alekou (free agent) |
| 77 | DF | VEN | Raúl González Guzmán (from P.O. Xylotymbou) |

Out:

| No. | Pos. | Nation | Player |
|---|---|---|---|
| 1 | GK | CYP | Giorgos Loizou (to Othellos Athienou) |
| 11 | FW | CYP | Nicos Panayides (to ASIL) |
| 21 | DF | VEN | Andrés Rouga (to ASIL) |
| 23 | MF | CYP | Zacharias Theodorou (to Ermis Aradippou) |
| 25 | DF | CYP | Christoforos Christofi (to Othellos Athienou) |
| 33 | DF | MKD | Bojan Markovski (to Othellos Athienou) |

=== Chalkanoras Idaliou ===
In:

| No. | Pos. | Nation | Player |

Out:

| No. | Pos. | Nation | Player |

=== Digenis Oroklinis ===
In:

| No. | Pos. | Nation | Player |

Out:

| No. | Pos. | Nation | Player |

=== Enosis Neon Paralimni ===
In:

| No. | Pos. | Nation | Player |
|---|---|---|---|
| — | MF | CYP | Kyriacos Pavlou (from Aris Limassol) |
| — | DF | CYP | Ioannis Antoniou (from Ermis Aradippou) |
| — | FW | CYP | Kristis Andreou (from AEZ Zakakiou) |
| — | MF | CYP | Evangelos Kyriacou (from Aris Limassol) |
| — | GK | ESP | Pulpo Romero (from (Spain) La Roda) |
| — | FW | CYP | Georgios Kolokoudias (from Nea Salamina) |

Out:

| No. | Pos. | Nation | Player |
|---|---|---|---|
| -- | FW | GRE | Thomas Tsitas (to Omonia Aradippou) |
| 23 | DF | ENG | Michael Felgate (to Anagennisi Deryneia) |
| 86 | FW | CYP | Theodoros Iosifides (loan return to Apollon Limassol) |

=== Ethnikos Assia ===
In:

| No. | Pos. | Nation | Player |
|---|---|---|---|
| — | GK | CYP | Evgenios Petrou (from Akritas Chlorakas) |
| — | DF | CYP | Konstantinos Kyriakou (on loan from AEL Limassol) |

Out:

| No. | Pos. | Nation | Player |
|---|---|---|---|
| 10 | MF | CYP | Panayiotis Efthymiades (to THOI Lakatamia) |
| 77 | DF | CYP | Frangiskos Zarou (to P.O. Xylotymbou) |

=== Karmiotissa ===
In:

| No. | Pos. | Nation | Player |
|---|---|---|---|
| — | DF | CYP | Pantelis Pitsillos (from Pafos) |
| — | FW | ZIM | Musa Mguni (from Omonia Aradippou) |
| — | MF | CYP | Valentinos Pastellis (from Pafos) |
| — | DF | GRE | Vassilios Apostolopoulos (free agent) |
| 4 | DF | CYP | Sotiris Vasiliou (on loan from AEL Limassol) |
| 20 | MF | CYP | Andreas Neofytou (on loan from AEL Limassol) |
| — | DF | BRA | Edmar (from Doxa Katokopias) |

Out:

| No. | Pos. | Nation | Player |
|---|---|---|---|
| — | MF | CYP | Christos Modestou (to Omonia Aradippou, previously on loan to Akritas Chlorakas) |
| 3 | DF | ARM | Taron Voskanyan (to Nea Salamina) |
| 5 | MF | GRE | Giannis Taralidis (to Ermis Aradippou) |
| 8 | MF | CYP | Evgenios Kyriakou (to Aris Limassol) |
| 12 | DF | CYP | Christos Wheeler (loan return to Apollon Limassol) |
| 16 | MF | SRB | Marko Adamović (to (Israel) Hapoel Ra'anana) |
| 27 | FW | SVN | David Poljanec (to Aris Limassol) |
| 34 | DF | GRE | Manolis Saliakas (loan return to Olympiacos) |
| 91 | MF | ARM | David Manoyan (to Nea Salamina) |

=== Omonia Aradippou ===
In:

| No. | Pos. | Nation | Player |
|---|---|---|---|
| — | GK | AUT | Miroslav Orlic (from ENAD Polis Chrysochous) |
| — | MF | CYP | Demetris Charalambous (from THOI Lakatamia) |
| — | MF | GHA | Maxwell Ankomah (from PAEEK) |
| — | MF | CYP | Christos Modestou (from Karmiotissa) |
| — | DF | CYP | Thanasis Liasides (from THOI Lakatamia) |
| — | FW | GRE | Thomas Tsitas (from Enosis Neon Paralimni) |

Out:

| No. | Pos. | Nation | Player |
|---|---|---|---|
| 4 | DF | CYP | Pantelis Konomis (loan return to Omonia) |
| 6 | DF | CYP | Panayiotis Loizides (to Alki Oroklini) |
| 70 | FW | ZIM | Musa Mguni (to Karmiotissa) |

=== Othellos Athienou ===
In:

| No. | Pos. | Nation | Player |
|---|---|---|---|
| — | DF | CYP | Panayiotis Panayiotou (from PAEEK) |
| — | DF | CYP | Christoforos Christofi (from Ayia Napa) |
| — | DF | MKD | Bojan Markovski (from Ayia Napa) |
| — | MF | CYP | Nicos Pitsillidis (from Enosis Neon Parekklisia) |
| — | DF | GRE | Vangelis Tsiamis (from PAEEK) |
| — | MF | GRE | Vasilios Emmanouil (from PAEEK) |
| — | GK | CYP | Giorgos Loizou (from Ayia Napa) |
| — | FW | ROU | Mihai Dina (from (Romania) Metalul Reșița) |
| — | MF | CYP | Antonis Katsis (from AEZ Zakakiou) |
| — | FW | ROU | Florin Costea (free agent) |
| — | MF | NED | Manuel Reangelo (from ENAD Polis Chrysochous) |

Out:

| No. | Pos. | Nation | Player |
|---|---|---|---|
| 8 | DF | GHA | Livingstone Adjin (to ASIL) |
| 12 | FW | PAR | Aldo Adorno (to THOI Lakatamia) |
| 27 | DF | CYP | Andreas Themistokleous (to PAEEK) |
| 32 | GK | CYP | Gavriel Constantinou (to ASIL) |
| 91 | MF | CYP | Christos Djamas (to PAEEK) |

=== PAEEK ===
In:

| No. | Pos. | Nation | Player |
|---|---|---|---|
| — | FW | GRE | Lambros Thanailakis (from (Greece) Ilisiakos) |
| — | GK | GRE | Michalis Agrimakis (from (Greece) Panelefsiniakos) |
| — | MF | GRE | Sergios Panayiotou (from AEZ Zakakiou) |
| — | MF | GRE | Stefanos Martsakis (from (Greece) Doxa Drama) |
| — | DF | CYP | Andreas Themistokleous (from Othellos Athienou) |
| — | MF | CYP | Christos Djamas (from Othellos Athienou) |

Out:

| No. | Pos. | Nation | Player |
|---|---|---|---|
| 3 | DF | GRE | Ioannis Pechlivanopoulos (to THOI Lakatamia) |
| 5 | DF | GRE | Vangelis Tsiamis (to Othellos Athienou) |
| 6 | MF | GHA | Maxwell Ankomah (to Omonia Aradippou) |
| 8 | FW | CYP | Achilleas Vassiliou (to THOI Lakatamia) |
| 10 | MF | CYP | Nicolas Oratiou (to THOI Lakatamia) |
| 33 | MF | GRE | Vasilios Emmanouil (to Othellos Athienou) |
| 77 | DF | CYP | Panayiotis Panayiotou (to Othellos Athienou) |

=== P.O. Xylotymbou ===
In:

| No. | Pos. | Nation | Player |
|---|---|---|---|
| 3 | DF | CYP | Zannetos Koumasis (from Achyronas Liopetriou) |
| 5 | DF | GRE | Nodaris Kalaintzides (from Digenis Akritas Morpou) |
| 21 | MF | CYP | Fanos Vasiliou (from Ethnikos Latsion) |
| 23 | MF | CYP | Stavros Zevlaris (from MEAP Nisou) |
| 77 | GK | CYP | Andreas Efstathiou (from Doxa Katokopias) |
| — | DF | CYP | Frangiskos Zarou (from Ethnikos Assia) |

Out:

| No. | Pos. | Nation | Player |
|---|---|---|---|
| 20 | MF | VEN | Héctor González (to ASIL Lysi) |
| 77 | DF | VEN | Raúl González Guzmán (to Ayia Napa FC) |

=== THOI Lakatamia ===
In:

| No. | Pos. | Nation | Player |
|---|---|---|---|
| — | DF | CYP | Andreas Antoniou (from ASIL) |
| — | MF | CYP | Nicolas Oratiou (from PAEEK) |
| — | MF | CYP | Panayiotis Efthymiades (from Ethnikos Assia) |
| — | FW | PAR | Aldo Adorno (from Othellos Athienou) |
| — | DF | GRE | Ioannis Pechlivanopoulos (from PAEEK) |
| — | GK | CYP | Zannetos Mytidis (from Ethnikos Achna) |
| — | FW | CYP | Achilleas Vassiliou (from PAEEK) |

Out:

| No. | Pos. | Nation | Player |
|---|---|---|---|
| 10 | MF | CYP | Demetris Charalambous (to Omonia Aradippou) |
| 18 | DF | CYP | Thanasis Liasides (to Omonia Aradippou) |
