= 2022–23 AEK Larnaca FC season =

AEK Larnaca
2022–23 season
- Manager: José Luis Oltra
- Stadium: AEK Arena – Georgios Karapatakis
- Cypriot First Division: 3rd
- Cypriot Cup: Second round
- UEFA Champions League: Second qualifying round
- UEFA Europa League: Group stage
- UEFA Europa Conference League: Round of 16
- Top goalscorer: League: Ivan Trichkovski (11)
- Biggest win: 4–0 v Anorthosis Famagusta (Home, 1 October 2022, Cypriot First Division); 4–0 v Karmiotissa (Home, 30 October 2022, Cypriot First Division)
- Biggest defeat: 0–4 v Nea Salamis Famagusta (Away, 11 January 2023, Cypriot Cup); 0–4 v West Ham United (Away, 16 March 2023, UEFA Europa Conference League); 0–4 v Aris Limassol (Away, 20 March 2023, Cypriot First Division); 0–4 v Pafos (Away, 11 April 2023, Cypriot First Division)
Home colours	Away colours

The 2022–23 season was AEK Larnaca's 13th consecutive season in the Cypriot First Division and 29th season in existence as a football club. In addition to the domestic league, the club participated in the Cypriot Cup, the UEFA Champions League, the UEFA Europa League and the UEFA Europa Conference League.

== Squad ==
As of 28 March 2023

Note: Flags indicate national team as defined under FIFA eligibility rules; some limited exceptions apply. Players may hold more than one non-FIFA nationality.

No.	Pos.	Nation	Player
1	GK	BIH	Kenan Pirić
3	DF	ESP	Mikel González
4	DF	SRB	Nenad Tomović
5	DF	ESP	Ismael Casas
6	MF	ESP	Oier
7	MF	POR	Luís Gustavo Ledes
8	FW	POR	Bruno Gama
10	FW	MKD	Ivan Trichkovski
11	FW	FRA	Imad Faraj
12	FW	POR	Rafael Lopes
13	GK	CYP	Dimitrios Stylianidis
14	DF	ESP	Ángel García
15	DF	BIH	Hrvoje Miličević
16	DF	VEN	Roberto Rosales
17	MF	ESP	Pere Pons

No.	Pos.	Nation	Player
19	FW	NGA	Victor Olatunji
20	FW	UKR	Artem Hromov
21	DF	CYP	Nikos Englezou
24	DF	CYP	Kypros Christoforou
25	GK	SRB	Miloš Gordić
29	MF	CYP	Giorgos Naoum
30	DF	CYP	Henry Bates Andreou
38	GK	CYP	Ioakeim Toumpas
44	FW	CRO	Marin Jakoliš
45	FW	HUN	Ádám Gyurcsó
51	FW	ISR	Omri Altman
66	DF	CYP	Rafail Mamas
78	GK	CYP	Andreas Paraskevas
99	FW	HUN	Nemanja Nikolić

== Competitions ==
=== Overview ===
Competition	First match	Last match	Starting round	Final position	Record							
Competition	First match	Last match	Starting round	Final position	Pld	W	D	L	GF	GA	GD	Win %
Cypriot First Division	29 August 2022	28 May 2023	Matchday 1	3rd	36	20	6	10	55	37	+18	55.56
Cypriot Cup	11 January 2023	11 January 2023	Second round	Second round	1	0	0	1	0	4	−4	0.00
UEFA Champions League	19 July 2022	26 July 2022	Second qualifying round	Second qualifying round	2	0	2	0	2	2	+0	0.00
UEFA Europa League	4 August 2022	3 November 2022	Third qualifying round	Group stage	10	4	3	3	16	14	+2	40.00
UEFA Europa Conference League	16 February 2023	16 March 2023	Knockout round play-offs	Round of 16	4	1	1	2	1	6	−5	25.00
Total					53	25	12	16	74	63	+11	47.17

Source: Competitions

=== Cypriot First Division ===
==== Regular season ====
===== League table =====
Pos	Team	Pld	W	D	L	GF	GA	GD	Pts	Qualification or relegation
1	APOEL	26	18	5	3	40	13	+27	59	Qualification for the Championship round
2	AEK Larnaca	26	18	3	5	46	21	+25	57	Qualification for the Championship round
3	Aris Limassol	26	15	8	3	46	20	+26	53	Qualification for the Championship round
4	Pafos	26	14	8	4	48	20	+28	50	Qualification for the Championship round
5	Apollon Limassol	25	13	5	7	34	27	+7	44	Qualification for the Championship round

Source: Cyprus Football Association
Rules for classification: 1) Points; 2) Head-to-head points; 3) Head-to-head goal difference; 4) Head-to-head goals scored; 5) Head-to-head away goals scored (only if two teams); 6) Goal difference; 7) Goals scored; 8) Play-off (only if deciding championship round, relegation round or relegation).

===== Results summary =====
Overall								Home						Away					
Pld	W	D	L	GF	GA	GD	Pts	W	D	L	GF	GA	GD	W	D	L	GF	GA	GD
26	18	3	5	46	21	+25	57	11	2	0	28	9	+19	7	1	5	18	12	+6

Source: Worldfootball

===== Results by round =====
Round	1	2	3	4	5	6	7	8	9	10	11	12	13	14	15	16	17	18	19	20	21	22	23	24	25	26
Ground	H	A	H	A	H	A	H	A	H	A	H	H	A	A	H	A	H	A	H	A	H	A	H	A	A	H
Result	D	L	W	L	W	W	W	L	W	W	W	W	W	W	W	W	W	D	W	W	W	W	D	L	L	W
Position	8	10	7	9	6	4	4	5	4	4	4	4	4	3	3	2	1	1	1	1	1	1	1	1	2	2
Points	1	1	4	4	7	10	13	13	16	19	22	25	28	31	34	37	40	41	44	47	50	53	54	54	54	57

Source: Worldfootball
A = Away; H = Home; W = Win; D = Draw; L = Loss

==== Matches ====
29 August 2022 1	AEK Larnaca	0–0	Doxa Katokopias	Larnaca
20:00 EEST (UTC+3)	Tomović (yellow card) 21'; Mamas (yellow card) 42'; Miličević (yellow card) 90+1'	Report	Kovacevic (yellow card) 83'; Shishkovski (yellow card) 88'; Stylianou (yellow card) 90+4'	Stadium: AEK Arena – Georgios Karapatakis; Referee: I. Christodoulou

3 September 2022 2	Omonia	3–2	AEK Larnaca	Nicosia
20:00 EEST (UTC+3)	Bezus 34'; Bruno 49' (pen.); Yuste (yellow card) 56'; Charalampous (yellow card) 69'; Papoulis (yellow card) 80', (goal) 85'	Report	González (yellow card) 29'; Gyurcsó (yellow card) 43', (goal) 56' (pen.); Rosales (yellow card) 63'; Olatunji 64'	Stadium: GSP Stadium; Referee: C. Theouli

11 September 2022 3	AEK Larnaca	1–0	Nea Salamis Famagusta	Larnaca
20:00 EEST (UTC+3)	Oier 44'; Mamas (yellow card) 82'; Englezou (yellow card) 90+5'	Report	Mandjeck (yellow card) 53'; Miguelito (yellow card) 62'; Banza (yellow card) 90+4'	Stadium: AEK Arena – Georgios Karapatakis; Referee: A. Menelaos

18 September 2022 4	Pafos	1–0	AEK Larnaca	Paphos
19:00 EEST (UTC+3)	Kvída (yellow card) 5'; Bajrić (yellow card) 36'; Jairo 78'	Report	Pirić (yellow card) 3'; Altman (yellow card) 70'	Stadium: Stelios Kyriakides Stadium; Referee: M. Christoforou

1 October 2022 5	AEK Larnaca	4–0	Anorthosis Famagusta	Larnaca
20:00 EEST (UTC+3)	Gyurcsó 15'; Trichkovski 45+1' (pen.); Englezou (yellow card) 75'; García (yellow card) 83'; Hambardzumyan 84' (o.g.); Christofi 90+6' (o.g.)	Report	Ninga (yellow card) 53'; Hambardzumyan (yellow card) 80'; Warda (yellow card) 87'	Stadium: AEK Arena – Georgios Karapatakis; Referee: K. Fotiou

9 October 2022 6	Aris Limassol	1–2	AEK Larnaca	Larnaca
19:00 EEST (UTC+3)	Mayambela (yellow card) 11'; Kokorin 32'	Report	Trichkovski 23'; Romo 73'	Stadium: Antonis Papadopoulos Stadium; Referee: C. Theouli

17 October 2022 7	AEK Larnaca	4–2	Olympiakos Nicosia	Larnaca
19:00 EEST (UTC+3)	Kartashyan 7' (o.g.); Tomović (yellow card) 17'; Naoum (yellow card) 20'; Altman (yellow card) 22'; Trichkovski 44', 90+5'; Englezou (yellow card) 61'; Lopes 90+3', (yellow card) 90+3'	Report	Soares (yellow card) 27'; Esselink (yellow card) 38'; Hendriks 50'; Psychas 56', (yellow card) 63'; Salli (yellow card) 70'; Dosis (yellow card) 73'; Koroma (yellow card) 75'; Ioannou (yellow card) 90+2'	Stadium: AEK Arena – Georgios Karapatakis; Referee: K. Fellas

22 October 2022 8	APOEL	1–0	AEK Larnaca	Nicosia
20:00 EEST (UTC+3)	Kvilitaia (yellow card) 12'; Donis 41'; Daushvili (yellow card) 76'; Villafáñez (yellow card) 87'; Maglica (yellow card) 88'	Report	Altman (yellow card) 73'	Stadium: GSP Stadium; Referee: M. Marcenaro (Italy)

30 October 2022 9	AEK Larnaca	4–0	Karmiotissa	Larnaca
17:00 EET (UTC+2)	Altman (yellow card) 1'; Mamas (yellow card) 53'; Miličević (yellow card) 55'; Gyurcsó (yellow card) 90+6'	Report	Coulibaly (yellow card) 52'; Malone (yellow card) 59'	Stadium: AEK Arena – Georgios Karapatakis; Referee: K. Athanassiou

7 November 2022 10	Akritas Chlorakas	1–2	AEK Larnaca	Paphos
19:00 EET (UTC+2)	Korać (yellow card) 43'; El Jemili (yellow card) 57'; Ramires 90+8'	Report	Lopes 15'; Casas (yellow card) 40'; Miličević 59'; Pons (yellow card) 72'	Stadium: Stelios Kyriakides Stadium; Referee: S. Kyriakidis

13 November 2022 11	AEK Larnaca	1–0	AEL Limassol	Larnaca
17:00 EET (UTC+2)	Pons (yellow card) 28'; Altman 65', (yellow card) 79'	Report	Tshibola (yellow card) 11'; Bruno Santos (yellow card) 14'; Medojević (yellow card) 46'; Basto (yellow card) 58'	Stadium: AEK Arena – Georgios Karapatakis; Referee: K. Fotiou

26 November 2022 12	AEK Larnaca	1–0	Apollon Limassol	Larnaca
19:00 EET (UTC+2)	Pons 50'; Tomović (yellow card) 67'; Miličević (yellow card) 69'; Trichkovski (yellow card) 81'	Report	Mavrias (yellow card) 45+2'; Roberge (yellow card) 57'; V. Jovanović (yellow card) 90+4' (not on pitch)	Stadium: AEK Arena – Georgios Karapatakis; Referee: C. Theouli

2 December 2022 13	Enosis Neon Paralimni	0–2	AEK Larnaca	Paralimni
19:00 EET (UTC+2)	Vucenovic (yellow card) 45+1'	Report	Lopes 29'; González (yellow card) 40'; Oier 70'	Stadium: Paralimni Stadium; Referee: A. Argyrou

9 December 2022 14	Doxa Katokopias	0–1	AEK Larnaca	Nicosia
19:00 EET (UTC+2)	Abdullahi (yellow card) 27'; Kerla (yellow card) 57'; Kovacevic (yellow card) 88'; Sadik (yellow card) 90'	Report	González (yellow card) 54'; Gyurcsó 60'; Mamas (yellow card) 90+4'	Stadium: Makario Stadium; Referee: D. Solomou

16 December 2022 15	AEK Larnaca	2–1	Omonia	Larnaca
19:00 EET (UTC+2)	Faraj 32'; Pons (yellow card) 64'; Altman (yellow card) 68'; Lopes 82'	Report	Lang 23'; Psaltis (yellow card) 68'; Bachirou (yellow card) 90+2'	Stadium: AEK Arena – Georgios Karapatakis; Referee: G. Manganiello (Italy)

21 December 2022 16	Nea Salamis Famagusta	0–2	AEK Larnaca	Larnaca
19:00 EET (UTC+2)	Dorregaray (yellow card) 12'; Taulemesse (yellow card) 55'	Report	Romo 34', (yellow card) 67'; Altman 40'; García (yellow card) 44'; Ledes (yellow card) 45+2'; Casas (yellow card) 59'	Stadium: Ammochostos Epistrofi Stadium; Referee: A. Argyrou

4 January 2023 17	AEK Larnaca	1–0	Pafos	Larnaca
19:00 EET (UTC+2)	Altman 15'; Oier (yellow card) 31'; Ledes (yellow card) 53'; Mamas (yellow card) 90+5'; Romo (yellow card) 90+10'	Report	Kvída (yellow card) 85'; Dragomir (yellow card) 90+1'; Ikoko (yellow card) 90+10'	Stadium: AEK Arena – Georgios Karapatakis; Referee: D. Doveri (Italy)

7 January 2023 18	Anorthosis Famagusta	0–0	AEK Larnaca	Larnaca
19:00 EET (UTC+2)	Antoniadis (yellow card) 20'; Hambardzumyan (yellow card) 24'; Ioannou (yellow card) 55'; Haroyan (yellow card) 58'; Tejera (yellow card) 75'	Report	Gyurcsó (penalty missed) 21'; González (yellow card) 35'; Lopes (yellow card) 57'	Stadium: Antonis Papadopoulos Stadium; Referee: K. Fotiou

15 January 2023 19	AEK Larnaca	4–3	Aris Limassol	Larnaca
17:00 EET (UTC+2)	Altman 33', 67'; Lopes 35'; García (yellow card) 84'; Faraj 90+5'	Report	Boakye (yellow card) 16'; Struski 21', (yellow card) 21'; Stępiński (yellow card) 25'; Gomis 28', 80'; Vaná (yellow card) 34'; Szöke (yellow card) 90'	Stadium: AEK Arena – Georgios Karapatakis; Referee: C. Theouli

20 January 2023 20	Olympiakos Nicosia	0–2	AEK Larnaca	Nicosia
19:00 EET (UTC+2)	V. Kyriakou (yellow card) 26'; Koroma (yellow card) 67'; Psychas (yellow card) 76'; Guerrier (yellow card) 90+4'	Report	Faraj 15'; Pons 65'	Stadium: Makario Stadium; Referee: A. Argyrou

28 January 2023 21	AEK Larnaca	2–1	APOEL	Larnaca
17:00 EET (UTC+2)	García 3', (yellow card) 55'; Faraj 61'; Tomović (yellow card) 69'; Oier (yellow card) 87'; Rosales (yellow card) 90+3'	Report	Ferrari (yellow card) 72'; Marquinhos 90'	Stadium: AEK Arena – Georgios Karapatakis; Referee: F. Verissimo (Portugal)

4 February 2023 22	Karmiotissa	1–3	AEK Larnaca	Limassol
15:00 EET (UTC+2)	Ďuriš (yellow card) 16', (goal) 44'; Gaztañaga (yellow card) 38'; Kaltsas (yellow card) 72'	Report	Faraj (yellow card) 27'; Englezou 35'; Nikolić 48'; Pons 72'	Stadium: Tsirio Stadium; Referee: A. Argyrou

10 February 2023 23	AEK Larnaca	1–1	Akritas Chlorakas	Larnaca
18:00 EET (UTC+2)	Tomović (yellow card) 27'; Pons (yellow card) 29'; Trichkovski 90+2'	Report	Gavriil (yellow card) 16'; Torres 21'; Perntreou (yellow card) 27'; Šehić (yellow card) 59'	Stadium: AEK Arena – Georgios Karapatakis; Referee: K. Fotiou

19 February 2023 24	AEL Limassol	2–1	AEK Larnaca	Limassol
15:30 EET (UTC+2)	Berahino 11'; Kačaniklić (yellow card) 22', (goal) 36'; Papafotis (yellow card) 31'; Dewaest (yellow card) 87'	Report	Trichkovski 43' (pen.); Oier (yellow card) 62'	Stadium: Alphamega Stadium; Referee: A. Argyrou

27 February 2023 25	Apollon Limassol	2–1	AEK Larnaca	Limassol
15:30 EET (UTC+2)	Khammas (yellow card) 33' (yellow-red card) 51'; Warda (yellow card) 45+2' (not on pitch), 90+7'; Donyoh 63'; Kyriakou (yellow card) 86'	Report	Miličević 76'; Tomović (yellow card) 90+4'	Stadium: Alphamega Stadium; Referee: I. Bebek (Croatia)

4 March 2023 26	AEK Larnaca	3–1	Enosis Neon Paralimni	Larnaca
19:00 EET (UTC+2)	Trichkovski 9', 14', 84' (pen.)	Report	Ehmann 49', (yellow card) 90+3'; Lucero (yellow card) 68'	Stadium: AEK Arena – Georgios Karapatakis; Referee: K. Athanassiou

==== Championship round ====
===== Championship round table =====
Pos	Team	Pld	W	D	L	GF	GA	GD	Pts	Qualification	ARI	APOE	AEK	PAF	APOL	OMO
1	Aris Limassol (C)	36	21	11	4	65	28	+37	74	Qualification for the Champions League second qualifying round	—	0–0	4–0	2–1	2–0	1–0
2	APOEL	36	20	11	5	52	26	+26	71	Qualification for the Europa Conference League second qualifying round	4–3	—	2–1	0–0	0–2	0–0
3	AEK Larnaca	36	20	6	10	55	37	+18	66	Qualification for the Europa Conference League second qualifying round	1–1	2–2	—	1–1	0–1	2–0
4	Pafos	36	17	12	7	60	30	+30	63		2–2	1–1	4–0	—	2–1	0–1
5	Apollon Limassol	35	19	5	11	47	37	+10	62		0–1	3–2	1–0	0–1	—	3–1
6	Omonia (Note: Cup winner)	36	15	4	17	43	42	+1	49	Qualification for the Europa Conference League second qualifying round	0–3	1–1	0–2	2–0	1–2	—

Source: Cyprus Football Association
Rules for classification: 1) Points; 2) Head-to-head points; 3) Head-to-head goal difference; 4) Head-to-head goals scored; 5) Head-to-head away goals scored (only if two teams); 6) Goal difference; 7) Goals scored; 8) Play-off (only if deciding championship round, relegation round or relegation).
(C) Champions

===== Results summary =====
Overall								Home						Away					
Pld	W	D	L	GF	GA	GD	Pts	W	D	L	GF	GA	GD	W	D	L	GF	GA	GD
10	2	3	5	9	16	−7	9	1	3	1	6	5	+1	1	0	4	3	11	−8

Source: Worldfootball

===== Results by round =====
Round	27	28	29	30	31	32	33	34	35	36
Ground	H	A	H	A	H	A	H	A	H	A
Result	L	L	D	L	W	L	D	L	D	W
Position	2	3	3	3	3	3	3	3	3	3
Points	57	57	58	58	61	61	62	62	63	66

Source: Worldfootball
A = Away; H = Home; W = Win; D = Draw; L = Loss

===== Matches =====
13 March 2023 27	AEK Larnaca	0–1	Apollon Limassol	Larnaca
19:00 EET (UTC+2)	Ledes (red card) 7'; Rosales (yellow card) 72'; Tomović (yellow card) 78' (red card) 90+8'	Report	Pittas (yellow card) 16'; A. Jovanović (yellow card) 25'; Vá (yellow card) 29'; Iliev 37'; Kyriakou (yellow card) 74'; Henty (red card) 90+8'	Stadium: AEK Arena – Georgios Karapatakis; Referee: I. Christodoulou

20 March 2023 28	Aris Limassol	4–0	AEK Larnaca	Limassol
17:00 EET (UTC+2)	Kokorin 10'; Gomis 60'; Szöke (yellow card) 71'; Mayambela 77', 87', (yellow card) 87'	Report	Altman (yellow card) 4'; Pons (yellow card) 59'	Stadium: Alphamega Stadium; Referee: I. Bebek (Croatia)

3 April 2023 29	AEK Larnaca	2–2	APOEL	Larnaca
18:00 EEST (UTC+3)	Gyurcsó 10'; García (yellow card) 26'; Trichkovski 89'; Nikolić (yellow card) 90+5'	Report	Kvilitaia 11', 37'; Ndongala (yellow card) 65'; Ferrari (yellow card) 79'	Stadium: AEK Arena – Georgios Karapatakis; Referee: S. Putros (Denmark)

11 April 2023 30	Pafos	4–0	AEK Larnaca	Paphos
18:00 EEST (UTC+3)	Abdurahimi 10', 23'; Ivušić (yellow card) 60'; Kvída (yellow card) 67'; Tanković 90'; Kané 90+4'	Report	Tomović (yellow card) 33'	Stadium: Stelios Kyriakides Stadium; Referee: G. Ayroldi (Italy)

21 April 2023 31	AEK Larnaca	2–0	Omonia	Larnaca
18:00 EEST (UTC+3)	Gyurcsó 9'; Faraj 34'	Report	Lang (yellow card) 21'; Tajouri-Shradi (yellow card) 23'; Charalampous (yellow card) 25'; Miletić (yellow card) 40'	Stadium: AEK Arena – Georgios Karapatakis; Referee: V. Ferreira (Portugal)

30 April 2023 32	Apollon Limassol	1–0	AEK Larnaca	Limassol
19:00 EEST (UTC+3)	Kyriakou 51'; Shahar (yellow card) 81'	Report	Ledes (yellow card) 71'; Mamas (yellow card) 90+6'	Stadium: Alphamega Stadium; Attendance: 5,000; Referee: V. Ferreira (Portugal)

6 May 2023 33	AEK Larnaca	1–1	Aris Limassol	Larnaca
18:00 EEST (UTC+3)	García (yellow card) 44' (yellow-red card) 77'; Kokorin 60' (o.g.)	Report	Szöke (yellow card) 27'; Kokorin 40'; Brown (yellow card) 59'; Pileas (yellow card) 80' (yellow-red card) 90+2'	Stadium: AEK Arena – Georgios Karapatakis; Attendance: 3,000; Referee: S. Putros (Denmark)

14 May 2023 34	APOEL	2–1	AEK Larnaca	Nicosia
18:00 EEST (UTC+3)	Kvilitaia (penalty missed) 21'; Marquinhos 25' (pen.); Dvali 54'	Report	Pons 15'; Nikolić (yellow card) 24'; Ledes (yellow card) 45+4'; Casas (yellow card) 75'	Stadium: GSP Stadium; Attendance: 11,368; Referee: M. Marchetti (Italy)

21 May 2023 35	AEK Larnaca	1–1	Pafos	Larnaca
18:00 EEST (UTC+3)	Lopes (yellow card) 45+3'; García (yellow card) 49'; Trichkovski 90+3'	Report	Kvída 38'; Tanković (red card) 45+2'; Hočko (yellow card) 45+3'; Palacios (yellow card) 45+7'; Ikoko (yellow card) 45+8'	Stadium: AEK Arena – Georgios Karapatakis; Attendance: 3,014; Referee: D. Bel (Croatia)

28 May 2023 36	Omonia	0–2	AEK Larnaca	Nicosia
18:00 EEST (UTC+3)		Report	Rosales (yellow card) 43'; Lopes 45'; González 66'	Stadium: GSP Stadium; Attendance: 8,598; Referee: D. Paterna (Italy)

=== Cypriot Cup ===
11 January 2023 Second round	Nea Salamis Famagusta	4–0	AEK Larnaca	Larnaca
19:00 EET (UTC+2)	Bauthéac 20' (pen.); Carlitos 52'; Dorregaray 80', 90+3'	Report	Mamas (red card) 90+1'	Stadium: Ammochostos Epistrofi Stadium

=== UEFA Champions League ===
==== Qualifying ====
===== Second qualifying round =====
19 July 2022 First leg	Midtjylland (Denmark)	1–1	(Cyprus) AEK Larnaca	Herning, Denmark
19:45 CEST (UTC+2)	Onyedika (yellow card) 19'; Charles (yellow card) 57'; Sviatchenko 84'; Lind (yellow card) 87'	Report	Miličević (yellow card) 47'; Gyurcsó 81'; Pirić (yellow card) 90+3'	Stadium: MCH Arena; Attendance: 7,008; Referee: Novak Simović (Serbia); Assistant referees: Nikola Djorovic (Serbia), Miloš Simovic (Serbia); Fourth official: Jovan Šegrt (Serbia)

26 July 2022 Second leg	AEK Larnaca (Cyprus)	1–1 (a.e.t.) (2–2 agg.) (3–4 p)	(Denmark) Midtjylland	Larnaca, Cyprus
18:30 EEST (UTC+3)	Olatunji 9'; Rosales (yellow card) 78'; Gama (yellow card)	Report	Dalsgaard 12'; Onyedika (yellow card) 60'; Juninho (yellow card) 69'	Stadium: AEK Arena – Georgios Karapatakis; Attendance: 6,163; Referee: István Vad (Hungary); Assistant referees: Vencel Tóth (Hungary), Istvan Albert (Hungary); Fourth official: Ferenc Karakó (Hungary)
	Penalties
	Altman (penalty missed); Miličević (penalty scored); Romo (penalty scored); Gama (penalty scored); Gustavo (penalty missed)		(penalty scored) Dreyer; (penalty scored) Sisto; (penalty scored) Sørensen; (penalty scored) Dyhr; (penalty missed) Kaba
Note: 2–2 on aggregate. Midtjylland won 4–3 on penalties.

=== UEFA Europa League ===
==== Qualifying ====
===== Third qualifying round =====
4 August 2022 First leg	AEK Larnaca (Cyprus)	2–1	(Serbia) Partizan	Larnaca, Cyprus
19:00 EEST (UTC+3)	García 34'; Oier (yellow card) 59'; Tomović (yellow card) 68'; Miličević 70'	Report	Menig 18'; Vujačić (yellow card) 59'; Urošević (yellow card) 59'; Fejsa (yellow card) 83'; Belić (yellow card) 90+3'	Stadium: AEK Arena – Georgios Karapatakis; Attendance: 4,250; Referee: Andris Treimanis (Latvia); Assistant referees: Haralds Gudermanis (Latvia), Aleksejs Spasennikovs (Latvia); Fourth official: Aleksandrs Golubevs (Latvia)

11 August 2022 Second leg	Partizan (Serbia)	2–2 (3–4 agg.)	(Cyprus) AEK Larnaca	Belgrade, Serbia
21:00 CEST (UTC+2)	Gomes 24', 54'; Natcho (yellow card) 52'; Lukač (yellow card) 52' (not on pitch); Marković (yellow card) 60'; Urošević (yellow card) 62'	Report	Gyurcsó 51'; Faraj 57'; Casas (yellow card) 81'; Mamas (yellow card) 90+1'; Pirić (yellow card) 90+2'	Stadium: Partizan Stadium; Attendance: 10,802; Referee: José María Sánchez Martínez (Spain); Assistant referees: Raúl Cabañero (Spain), Juan Lopez Mir (Spain); Fourth official: Jorge Figueroa Vázquez (Spain)
Note: AEK Larnaca won 4–3 on aggregate.

==== Play-off round ====
18 August 2022 First leg	Dnipro-1 (Ukraine)	1–2	(Cyprus) AEK Larnaca	Košice, Slovakia (Note: Due to the Russian invasion of Ukraine, Ukrainian teams were required to play their home matches at neutral venues until further notice. Therefore, Dnipro-1 played at Košická futbalová aréna, Košice, Slovakia, instead of their regular stadium Dnipro-Arena, Dnipro.)
20:00 CEST (UTC+2)	Sarapiy (red card) 63'; Svatok 90'	Report	Altman 16'; Miličević 29'; Ledes (yellow card) 62'; Casas (yellow card) 90+3'	Stadium: Košická futbalová aréna Attendance: 3,450; Referee: Tobias Stieler (Germany); Assistant referees: Christian Gittelmann (Germany), Eduard Beitinger (Germany); Fourth official: Martin Petersen (Germany)

25 August 2022 Second leg	AEK Larnaca (Cyprus)	3–0 (5–1 agg.)	(Ukraine) Dnipro-1	Larnaca, Cyprus
19:00 EEST (UTC+3)	Gyurcsó 21'; Lopes 45', (yellow card) 74'; Ledes (yellow card) 61'; Englezou 78'; García (yellow card) 90+1'	Report	Lohinov (yellow card) 14'; Babenko (yellow card) 42'	Stadium: AEK Arena – Georgios Karapatakis; Attendance: 4,893; Referee: Davide Massa (Italy); Assistant referees: Filippo Meli, Stefano Alassio; Fourth official: Rosario Abisso
Note: AEK Larnaca won 5–1 on aggregate.

==== Group stage ====
Pos	Team	Pld	W	D	L	GF	GA	GD	Pts	Qualification	FEN	REN	AEK	DKV
1	(Turkey) Fenerbahçe	6	4	2	0	13	7	+6	14	Advance to round of 16	—	3–3	2–0	2–1
2	(France) Rennes	6	3	3	0	11	8	+3	12	Advance to knockout round play-offs	2–2	—	1–1	2–1
3	(Cyprus) AEK Larnaca	6	1	2	3	7	10	−3	5	Transfer to Europa Conference League	1–2	1–2	—	3–3
4	(Ukraine) Dynamo Kyiv	6	0	1	5	5	11	−6	1		0–2	0–1	0–1	—

Source: UEFA
Rules for classification: Group stage tiebreakers

8 September 2022 1	AEK Larnaca (Cyprus)	1–2	(France) Rennes	Larnaca, Cyprus
19:45 EEST (UTC+3)	Oier 33'; Christoforou (yellow card) 90'	Report	Theate 29'; Santamaria (yellow card) 69'; Assignon 90+4'	Stadium: AEK Arena – Georgios Karapatakis; Attendance: 4,103; Referee: Giorgi Kruashvili (Georgia); Assistant referees: Levan Varamishvili, Zaza Pipia; Fourth official: Davit Kharitonashvili

15 September 2022 2	Dynamo Kyiv (Ukraine)	0–1	(Cyprus) AEK Larnaca	Kraków, Poland (Note: Due to the Russian invasion of Ukraine, Ukrainian teams were required to play their home matches at neutral venues until further notice. Therefore, Dynamo Kyiv played at Stadion Cracovii im. Józefa Piłsudskiego, Kraków, Poland, instead of their regular stadium NSC Olimpiyskiy, Kyiv.)
21:00 CEST (UTC+2)	Andriyevskyi (yellow card) 35'; Sydorchuk (yellow card) 76'	Report	Gyurcsó 8'; García (yellow card) 42'; Mamas (yellow card) 44'; Pons (yellow card) 64'; Pirić (yellow card) 83'	Stadium: Stadion Cracovii im. Józefa Piłsudskiego; Attendance: 3,362; Referee: Jakob Kehlet (Denmark); Assistant referees: Lars Hummelgaard (Denmark), Victor Skytte (Denmark); Fourth official: Sandi Putros (Denmark)

6 October 2022 3	Fenerbahçe (Turkey)	2–0	(Cyprus) AEK Larnaca	Istanbul, Turkey
22:00 EEST (UTC+3)	Batshuayi 26'; Osayi-Samuel (yellow card) 39'; Lincoln (yellow card) 45+2'; Mamas 79' (o.g.)	Report	Oier (yellow card) 9'; Faraj (yellow card) 12'; Altman (yellow card) 39'	Stadium: Şükrü Saracoğlu Stadium; Attendance: 38,860; Referee: Chris Kavanagh (England); Assistant referees: Dan Cook (England), Harry Lennard (England); Fourth official: Robert Jones (England)

13 October 2022 4	AEK Larnaca (Cyprus)	1–2	(Turkey) Fenerbahçe	Larnaca, Cyprus
19:45 EEST (UTC+3)	García (yellow card) 39' (yellow-red card) 85'; Mamas (yellow card) 41'; Trichkovski (yellow card) 49', (goal) 52' (pen.); Olatunji (yellow card) 88'; Pons (yellow card) 90+5'; Faraj (yellow card) 90+5'	Report	João Pedro 16'; Güler (yellow card) 33'; Lincoln (yellow card) 43'; Aziz (yellow card) 67'; Batshuayi 80' (pen.); Valencia (penalty missed) 86'; Gustavo Henrique (yellow card) 88'	Stadium: AEK Arena – Georgios Karapatakis; Attendance: 6,947; Referee: Paweł Raczkowski (Poland); Assistant referees: Radosław Siejka (Poland), Adam Kupsik (Poland); Fourth official: Pawel Malec (Poland)

27 October 2022 5	AEK Larnaca (Cyprus)	3–3	(Ukraine) Dynamo Kyiv	Larnaca, Cyprus
19:45 EEST (UTC+3)	Altman 26', 72'; Lopes 53'; Rosales (yellow card) 79'	Report	Shepelyev (yellow card) 35'; Vanat 45'; Tsyhankov (yellow card) 55'; Zabarnyi (yellow card) 69'; Harmash 82', 90+2'; Diallo (yellow card) 85'	Stadium: AEK Arena – Georgios Karapatakis; Attendance: 4,321; Referee: John Beaton (Scotland); Assistant referees: Daniel McFarlane (Scotland), Douglas Potter (Scotland); Fourth official: Steven McLean (Scotland)

3 November 2022 6	Rennes (France)	1–1	(Cyprus) AEK Larnaca	Rennes, France
21:00 CET (UTC+1)	Abline 17'; Tait (yellow card) 18'	Report	Miličević (yellow card) 28'; Oltra (yellow card) 28' (manager); Lopes 76'; Rosales (yellow card) 85'	Stadium: Roazhon Park; Attendance: 27,210; Referee: Mohammed Al-Hakim (Sweden); Assistant referees: Fredrik Klyver (Sweden), Robin Wilde (Sweden); Fourth official: Bojan Pandžić (Sweden)

=== UEFA Europa Conference League ===
==== Knockout phase ====
===== Knockout round play-offs =====
16 February 2023 First leg	AEK Larnaca (Cyprus)	1–0	(Ukraine) Dnipro-1	Larnaca, Cyprus
22:00 EET (UTC+2)	García (yellow card) 40', (goal) 84'	Report	Hamache (yellow card) 20'; Tanchyk (yellow card) 59'; Kucher (yellow card) 90+4' (manager)	Stadium: AEK Arena – Georgios Karapatakis; Attendance: 4,077; Referee: Jakob Kehlet (Denmark); Assistant referees: Lars Hummelgaard (Denmark), Victor Skytte (Denmark); Fourth official: Morten Krogh (Denmark)

23 February 2023 Second leg	Dnipro-1 (Ukraine)	0–0 (0–1 agg.)	(Cyprus) AEK Larnaca	Košice, Slovakia
18:45 CET (UTC+1)	Peglow (yellow card) 56'; Hayner (yellow card) 61'; Hutsulyak (yellow card) 76'	Report	García (yellow card) 13'; Tomović (yellow card) 63'; Pons (yellow card) 82'	Stadium: Košická futbalová aréna Attendance: 3,527; Referee: Andris Treimanis (Latvia); Assistant referees: Haralds Gudermanis (Latvia), Mārtiņš Svipsts (Latvia); Fourth official: Aleksandrs Golubevs (Latvia)
Note: AEK Larnaca won 1–0 on aggregate.

===== Round of 16 =====
9 March 2023 First leg	AEK Larnaca (Cyprus)	0–2	(England) West Ham United	Larnaca, Cyprus
19:45 EET (UTC+2)		Report	Antonio 36', 45+2'; Downes (yellow card) 68'; Kehrer (yellow card) 87'	Stadium: AEK Arena – Georgios Karapatakis; Attendance: 6,654; Referee: Espen Eskås (Norway); Assistant referees: Jan Erik Engan (Norway), Isaak Elias Bashevkin (Norway); Fourth official: Kristoffer Hagenes (Norway)

16 March 2023 Second leg	West Ham United (England)	4–0 (6–0 agg.)	(Cyprus) AEK Larnaca	London, England
20:00 GMT (UTC)	Scamacca 21'; Bowen 46', 49'; Mubama 65', (yellow card) 67'	Report	Ledes (red card) 43'	Stadium: London Stadium; Attendance: 40,482; Referee: Georgi Kabakov (Bulgaria); Assistant referees: Martin Margaritov (Bulgaria), Diyan Valkov (Bulgaria); Fourth official: Radoslav Gidzhenov (Bulgaria)
Note: West Ham United won 6–0 on aggregate.
