= 2018–19 Cypriot Cup =

77th season of Cypriot Cup

2018–19 Cyprus Coca-Cola Cup

Tournament details
- Country: Cyprus
- Dates: 5 December 2018 – 22 May 2019
- Teams: 24

Final positions
- Champions: AEL Limassol (7th title)
- Runners-up: APOEL

Tournament statistics
- Matches played: 28
- Goals scored: 101 (3.61 per match)
- Top goal scorer(s): Federico Rasic; Norbert Balogh; Ioannis Pittas (4 goals each)
- All statistics correct as of 17 April 2019.

The 2018–19 Cypriot Cup was the 77th edition of the Cypriot Cup. A total of 24 clubs were accepted to enter the competition. It began on 5 December 2018 with the first round and concluded on 22 May 2019 with the final held at GSP Stadium. The winner of the Cup was AEL Limassol for seventh time and qualified for the 2019–20 Europa League second qualifying round.

== First round ==
The first round draw took place on 5 December 2018 and the matches were played on 5 December 2018.

5 December 2018	Aris Limassol	4–1	Alki Oroklini	Tsirio Stadium, Limassol
14:30 EET	Kiriazis 4'; Ortega 52', 69' (pen.); Kyprou 90+5'	Report	Acosta 43'	Referee: Neofytos Neofytou

5 December 2018	Omonia	3–0	Onisilos Sotira 2014	GSP Stadium, Nicosia
16:00 EET	Prce 6'; Antonia 41'; Loé 81'	Report		Referee: Andreas Argyrou

5 December 2018	Akritas Chlorakas	0–7	Anorthosis Famagusta	Stelios Kyriakides Stadium, Paphos
17:00 EET		Report	Pranjić 14', 28'; Schildenfeld 25'; Ďuriš 78' (pen.); Kacharava 84', 89'	Referee: Konstantinos Fotiou

5 December 2018	Olympiakos Nicosia	0–5	Pafos FC	Makario Stadium, Nicosia
18:00 EET		Report	Rasic 18', 44', 47'; Nemec 36'; Panayiotou 75'	Referee: Avraam Tsoukkas

5 December 2018	Omonia Aradippou	0–3	AEL Limassol	GSZ Stadium, Larnaca
18:00 EET		Report	Markoski 3'; Tsiamis 28' (o.g.); Leandro 47'	Referee: Chrysovalantis Theouli

19 December 2018	Enosis Neon Paralimni	5–1	Digenis Oroklinis	Tasos Markou Stadium, Paralimni
14:30 EET	Bolmpocian 3' (o.g.); Sarr 13'; Pittas 21'; Udoji 36'; Kyriakou 47'	Report	Koumasis 85' (pen.)	Referee: Andreas Konstantinou

19 December 2018	PAEEK	0–4	Nea Salamis Famagusta	Makario Stadium, Nicosia
17:00 EET		Report	Sikorski 15' (pen.), 34', 73' (pen.); Piki 78'	Referee: Andreas M. Argyrou

19 December 2018	APOEL	5–0	Ayia Napa	GSP Stadium, Nicosia
19:00 EET	Balogh 32'; Efrem 47', 51', 67'; Gentsoglou 65'	Report		Referee: Konstantinos Photiou

== Second round ==
The second round draw took place on 21 December 2017.

The following eight teams advanced directly to second round and will meet the eight winners of the first round ties:

- AEK Larnaca (2017–18 Cypriot Cup winner)
- Apollon Limassol (2017–18 Cypriot Cup runners-up)
- ASIL Lysi (via draw)
- Doxa Katokopias (via draw)
- THOI Lakatamia (via draw)
- Ermis Aradippou (via draw)
- Ethnikos Achna (via draw)
- Karmiotissa (via draw)

Team 1	Agg.	Team 2	1st leg	2nd leg
APOEL	5–1	Doxa Katokopias	2–1	3–0
Ermis Aradippou	7–0	ASIL Lysi	3–0	4–0
Apollon Limassol	2–1	Omonia	1–0	1–1
Anorthosis	2–3	Enosis Neon Paralimni	2–3	0–0
Aris Limassol	3–5	Pafos FC	2–1	1–4
Nea Salamis Famagusta	1–4	AEK Larnaca	1–2	0–2
Karmiotissa	5–2	Ethnikos Achna	2–1	3–1
AEL Limassol	14–0	THOI Lakatamia	8–0	6–0

=== First leg ===
2 January 2019	APOEL	2–1	Doxa Katokopias	GSP Stadium, Nicosia
17:00 EET	Natel 60'; Balogh 66'	Report	Luís Carlos 32'	Attendance: 1,645; Referee: Andreas Konstantinou

2 January 2019	Ermis	3–0	ASIL Lysi	Ammochostos Stadium, Larnaca
18:00 EET	Didac Devesa 22'; Malón 35'; Taralidis 67'	Report		Attendance: 100; Referee: Konstantinos Photiou

2 January 2019	Apollon Limassol	1–0	Omonia	Tsirio Stadium, Limassol
18:00 EET	Maglica 11'	Report		Attendance: 1,000; Referee: Kostas Psevdiotis

16 January 2019	Anorthosis Famagusta	2–3	Enosis Neon Paralimni	Antonis Papadopoulos Stadium, Larnaca
14:00 EET	João Victor 22'; Mikeltadze 26'	Report	Pittas 14', 67'; Udoji 90+2'	Attendance: 800; Referee: Yiannis Anastasiou

16 January 2019	Aris Limassol	2–1	Pafos	Tsirio Stadium, Limassol
15:00 EET	Kyprou 69'; Armiche 75'	Report	Cools 59'	Attendance: 100; Referee: Andreas Konstantinou

16 January 2019	Nea Salamis Famagusta	1–2	AEK Larnaca	Ammochostos Stadium, Larnaca
16:31 EET	Onuegbu 5'	Report	Taulemesse 18' (pen.); Assoubre 90+4'	Attendance: 1,500; Referee: Kostas Psevdiotis

23 January 2019	Karmiotissa	2–1	Ethnikos Achna	GSZ Stadium, Larnaca
12:29 EET	Christofi 30'; Mashinya 38'	Report	Kyprianou 89' (pen.)	Attendance: 100; Referee: Kyriakos Christodoulou

30 January 2019	AEL Limassol	8–0	THOI Lakatamia	Tsirio Stadium, Limassol
15:01 EET	A. Teixeira 11'; Mitidis 25', 41' (pen.), 43'; Aganović 31'; Antonia 45'; Jurado 87' (pen.); Timotheou 89' (o.g.)	Report		Attendance: 300; Referee: Andreas Konstantinou

=== Second leg ===
16 January 2019	Omonia	1–1 (1–2 agg.)	Apollon Limassol	GSP Stadium, Nicosia
18:00 EET	Ramírez 77'	Report	Kévin Bru 69'	Attendance: 2,375; Referee: Leontios Trattou

16 January 2019	ASIL Lysi	0–4 (0–7 agg.)	Ermis	GSZ Stadium, Larnaca
15:00 EET		Report	Makriev 13', 41' (pen.); Taralidis 61' (pen.); Martynyuk 81'	Attendance: 100; Referee: Andreas Argyrou

23 January 2019	Pafos	4–1 (5–3 agg.)	Aris Limassol	Stelios Kyriakides, Paphos
17:00 EET	Nemec 21', 47' (pen.); Lulinha 57'; Rasic 90'	Report	Hadjipaschalis 31'	Attendance: 300; Referee: Chrysovalantis Theouli

23 January 2019	Enosis Neon Paralimni	0–0 (2–3 agg.)	Anorthosis Famagusta	Paralimni Municipal Stadium "Tasos Marcou", Paralimni
18:00 EET		Report		Attendance: 1,144; Referee: Nikolas Neokleous

30 January 2019	AEK Larnaca	2–0 (4–1 agg.)	Nea Salamis Famagusta	AEK Arena, Larnaca
16:00 EET	Trichkovski 22'; Acorán 58'	Report		Attendance: 1,000; Referee: Vasilis Demetriou

13 February 2019	THOI Lakatamia	0–6 (0–14 agg.)	AEL Limassol	Makario Stadium, Nicosia
15:01 EET		Report	Mitidis 35'; Aganović 42'; Avraam 61', 64'; Gerolemou 76'; Michaelides 87'	Attendance: 70; Referee: Andreas Argyrou

20 February 2019	Ethnikos Achna	1–3 (2–5 agg.)	Karmiotissa	Dasaki Stadium, Dasaki Achnas
15:00 EET	Kyprianou 66'	Report	Thanelas 75'; Mashinya 78'; Vattis 90+2'	Attendance: 50; Referee: Neofytos Neofytou

20 February 2019	Doxa Katokopias	0–3 (1–5 agg.)	APOEL	Makario Stadium, Nicosia
16:00 EET		Report	Balogh 11', 67'; Aloneftis 13'	Attendance: 140; Referee: Loukas Soteriou

== Quarter-finals ==
The quarter-finals draw took place on 4 February 2019 and the matches were played on 20, 27 February and 6 March 2019.

Team 1	Agg.	Team 2	1st leg	2nd leg
AEL Limassol	7–2	Ermis Aradippou	4–0	3–2
Pafos FC	3–3 (a)	Enosis Neon Paralimni	2–2	1–1
APOEL	4–4 (a)	AEK Larnaca	1–1	3–3
Karmiotissa	2–7	Apollon Limassol	1–5	1–2

=== First leg ===
20 February 2019	AEL Limassol	4–0	Ermis	Tsirio Stadium, Limassol
14:00 EET	Aganović 2', 88' (pen.); Wheeler 34'; Jurado 45'	Report		Attendance: 449; Referee: Avraam Tsoukkas

20 February 2019	Pafos	2–2	Enosis Neon Paralimni	Stelios Kyriakides Stadium, Paphos
15:00 EET	Angulo 44'; Karo 52'	Report	Udoji 24'; Charalambous 78'	Attendance: 300; Referee: Chrysovalantis Theouli

27 February 2019	APOEL	1–1	AEK Larnaca	GSP Stadium, Nicosia
16:00 EET	Zahid 18' (pen.)	Report	Sastre 39'	Attendance: 2,990; Referee: Giorgos Nikolaou

27 February 2019	Karmiotissa	1–5	Apollon Limassol	GSZ Stadium, Larnaca
17:00 EET	Neofytou 29'	Report	Pereyra 3', 6'; Carayol 26'; Faupala 32'; Papamichail 77'	Attendance: 200; Referee: Rovertos Costa

=== Second leg ===
27 February 2019	Ermis	2–3 (2–7 agg.)	AEL Limassol	Ammochostos Stadium, Larnaca
14:00 EET	Taralidis 74' (pen.); Makriev 82'	Report	Schranz 40'; Leandro Silva 45+2'; Lafrance 89'	Attendance: 8 Referee: Anastasis Anastasi

27 February 2019	Enosis Neon Paralimni	1–1 (3–3 agg.)	Pafos	Paralimni Stadium, Paralimni
15:00 EET	Kolokoudias 59' (pen.)	Report	Rasic 9'	Attendance: 1,000; Referee: Loukas Soteriou

6 March 2019	AEK Larnaca	3–3 (4–4 agg.)	APOEL	GSP Stadium, Nicosia
16:00 EET	Giannou 22'; Taulemesse 64' (pen.); Català 90+5'	Report	Vidigal 37'; Natel 89' (pen.); Efrem 90+3'	Attendance: 3,000; Referee: Leontios Trattou

6 March 2019	Apollon Limassol	2–1 (7–2 agg.)	Karmiotissa	Tsirio Stadium, Limassol
15:02 EET	Psychas 16'; Schembri 42'	Report	Pantos 48'	Attendance: 300; Referee: Constantinos Photiou

== Semi finals ==
The semi-finals draw took place on 8 March 2019 and the matches will be played on 3 and 17 April 2019.

Team 1	Agg.	Team 2	1st leg	2nd leg
APOEL	3–2	Enosis Neon Paralimni	1–0	2–2
Apollon Limassol	1–2	AEL Limassol	1–2	0–0

=== First leg ===
3 April 2019	Apollon Limassol	1–2	AEL Limassol	Tsirio Stadium, Limassol
16:00 EEST	Psychas 75'	Report	Jurado 40', 81' (pen.)	Attendance: 1,811; Referee: Yiannis Anastasiou

3 April 2019	APOEL	1–0	Enosis Neon Paralimni	GSP Stadium, Nicosia
18:00 EEST	Merkis 85'	Report		Attendance: 1,930; Referee: Leontios Trattou

=== Second leg ===
17 April 2019	Enosis Neon Paralimni	2–2 (2–3 agg.)	APOEL	Paralimni Stadium, Paralimni
17:00 EEST	Pittas 6'; Udoji 36'	Report	Aloneftis 27'; Vidigal 90+4'	Attendance: 1,500; Referee: Loukas Soteriou

17 April 2019	AEL Limassol	0–0 (2–1 agg.)	Apollon Limassol	Tsirio Stadium, Limassol
18:00 EEST		Report		Referee: Timotheos Christofi

== Final ==
22 May 2019
19:00 EEST

APOEL	0–2	AEL Limassol
	Report	Dossa 10'; Adamović 65'

GSP Stadium, Nicosia
Attendance: 8,980
Referee: Giorgos Nicolaou

Cypriot Cup 2018–19 Winners
AEL Limassol
7th Title

== See also ==
- 2018–19 Cypriot First Division
- 2018–19 Cypriot Second Division
