= Rubén Jurado =

Spanish footballer

Personal information
- Full name: Rubén Jurado Fernández
- Date of birth: 25 April 1986 (age 40)
- Place of birth: Seville, Spain
- Height: 1.78 m (5 ft 10 in)
- Position: Striker

Team information
- Current team: Montilla

Youth career
- Sevilla

Senior career*
Years	Team	Apps	(Gls)
2004–2006	Utrera		
2006	Sevilla B	3	(0)
2006–2007	Mairena		
2007	CP Berja		
2007–2008	Hellín	34	(7)
2008–2009	Mairena	1	(0)
2009–2011	Cacereño	33	(6)
2011	Almansa	15	(2)
2011–2015	Piast Gliwice	115	(37)
2015	Târgu Mureș	4	(0)
2015–2017	Atlético Baleares	71	(25)
2017–2018	Arka Gdynia	31	(5)
2018–2020	AEL Limassol	47	(20)
2020–2021	Barakaldo	6	(0)
2021	Poblense	16	(3)
2021–2022	Xerez	17	(6)
2022–2023	Recreativo	10	(2)
2022–2023	Puente Genil	21	(4)
2023–2024	Espeleño	33	(9)
2024–2025	Martos	31	(4)
2025–	Montilla	0	(0)
- * Club domestic league appearances and goals as of 1 July 2025

Rubén Jurado Fernández (born 25 April 1986) is a Spanish footballer who plays for Montilla as a striker.

== Honours ==
Piast Gliwice

- I liga: 2011–12

Arka Gdynia

- Polish Super Cup: 2017

AEL

- Cypriot Cup: 2018–19
