= José Romo =

Venezuelan footballer (born 1993)

Personal information
- Full name: José Rafael Romo Pérez
- Date of birth: 6 December 1993 (age 32)
- Place of birth: Turén, Venezuela
- Height: 1.95 m (6 ft 5 in)
- Position: Forward

Team information
- Current team: Athens Kallithea
- Number: 9

Youth career
- Atlético Turén
- Deportivo Táchira

Senior career*
Years	Team	Apps	(Gls)
2011–2013	Llaneros	39	(8)
2013–2014	Deportivo Petare	21	(1)
2014–2015	ACD Lara	28	(3)
2016	Rayo Vallecano B	27	(5)
2017–2018	Aragua	45	(7)
2018–2020	Olympiakos Nicosia	26	(15)
2019–2020	→ Karmiotissa (loan)	19	(9)
2020–2021	Karmiotissa	36	(11)
2021–2023	AEK Larnaca	49	(7)
2023	AEL Limassol	12	(1)
2023–2025	Levadiakos	57	(14)
2025–2026	Akritas Chlorakas	31	(6)
2026–	Athens Kallithea	2	(0)

International career
- Venezuela U20
- * Club domestic league appearances and goals as of 12 September 2026

José Rafael Romo Pérez (born 6 December 1993) is a Venezuelan professional footballer who plays as a striker for Super League Greece 2 club Athens Kallithea. He previously played domestically for Llaneros, Deportivo Petare, ACD Lara and Aragua, in the Spanish Tercera División for Rayo Vallecano B, and for Cypriot clubs Olympiakos Nicosia, Karmiotissa, AEK Larnaca, AEL Limassol and Levadiakos. He represented Venezuela at under-20 level.

== Club career ==
Romo was born in 1993 in Turén, Portuguesa, Venezuela. His father, Rafael Romo Abad, played football professionally as a goalkeeper, and he is a younger brother of Venezuelan international goalkeeper Rafael Romo. Romo played youth football for Atlético Turén and Deportivo Táchira before beginning his professional career with Llaneros in the 2011–12 Venezuelan Primera División. After two seasons and 39 Primera División appearances (8 goals), he signed a two-year contract with another top-flight club, Deportivo Petare. He was used mainly as a substitute, scored only once, and spent the second year of his contract on loan to ACD Lara. He was a regular starter during the Apertura, less so in the second half of the season, but made three appearances in the play-offs for qualification for the Copa Sudamericana, in which Lara lost out to Carabobo in a penalty shoot-out.

Romo spent the 2016–17 season with Rayo Vallecano B of the Spanish Tercera División (fourth tier). He missed some time through injury, but finished the season with five goals from 27 appearances. In December 2016, he was back in Venezuela to sign for Aragua. He played regularly for the Primera División club for one-and-a-half seasons, and then left after the 2018 Apertura to return to Europe. He signed for Cypriot Second Division club Olympiakos Nicosia; his brother Rafael was at the time playing for another Nicosia-based club, APOEL. In his first season, he scored six goals from his first seven outings, and ended the season with fifteen as he helped his team finish second in the division and gain promotion to the First Division. He was an unused substitute once in the First Division for Olympiakos, but was then loaned to another Second Division team, Karmiotissa. Again, he helped his team gain promotion, this time as 2019–20 champions. He then signed for Karmiotissa, and continued to play and score regularly in the top flight. In June 2021, he signed a three-year contract with Cypriot First Division club AEK Larnaca.

== International career ==
During his second season with Llaneros, he was selected for Venezuela's under-20 squad for the 2013 South American Youth Football Championship. He appeared in three of his country's four group matches as they finished fourth in their five-team group and did not progress further.

While at Rayo Vallecano in 2016, Romo was checked out by new Venezuela senior team manager, Rafael Dudamel, ahead of an unofficial friendly against Galicia, but he was not chosen.

== Career statistics ==
As of match played 10 November 2024

Appearances and goals by club, season and competition
Club	Season	League			National Cup		Other		Total	
Club	Season	Division	Apps	Goals	Apps	Goals	Apps	Goals	Apps	Goals
Llaneros	2011–12	Venezuelan Primera División	12	2			0	0	12	2
Llaneros	2012–13	Venezuelan Primera División	27	6			2 (Note: Appearances in Serie Sudamericana)	0	29	6
Llaneros	Total		39	8			2	0	41	8
Deportivo Petare	2013–14	Venezuelan Primera División	21	1			2	0	23	1
ACD Lara (loan)	2014–15	Venezuelan Primera División	28	3			3	0	31	3
Rayo Vallecano B	2015–16	Spanish Tercera División	27	5	—		—		27	5
Aragua	2017	Venezuelan Primera División	27	3			1 (Note: Appearance(s) in Apertura Liguilla)	0	28	3
Aragua	2018	Venezuelan Primera División	15	4			2	0	17	4
Aragua	Total		42	7			3	0	45	7
Olympiakos Nicosia	2018–19	Cypriot Second Division	26	15	0	0			26	15
Olympiakos Nicosia	2019–20	Cypriot First Division	0	0	0	0			0	0
Olympiakos Nicosia	Total		26	15	0	0			26	15
Karmiotissa (loan)	2019–20	Cypriot Second Division	19	9	2	0	—		21	9
Karmiotissa	2020–21	Cypriot First Division	36	11	2	0	—		38	11
Karmiotissa	Total		55	20	4	0	—		59	20
AEK Larnaca	2021–22	Cypriot First Division	31	5	5	5	—		36	10
AEK Larnaca	2022–23	Cypriot First Division	18	2	1	0	2 (Note: One appearance in UEFA Champions League, one in UEFA Europa League)	0	21	2
AEK Larnaca	Total		49	7	6	5	2	0	57	12
AEL Limassol	2022–23	Cypriot First Division	12	1	4	1	—		16	2
Levadiakos	2023–24	Super League Greece 2	25	11	2	1	—		27	12
Levadiakos	2024–25	Super League Greece	11	2	0	0	—		11	0
Levadiakos	Total		36	13	2	1	—		38	14
Career total			335	80	16	7	12	0	363	87
