= Rafail Mamas =

Cypriot footballer (born 2001)

Personal information
- Date of birth: 4 March 2001 (age 25)
- Place of birth: Nicosia, Cyprus
- Height: 1.85 m (6 ft 1 in)
- Position: Midfielder

Team information
- Current team: Sarajevo
- Number: 66

Youth career
- –2018: AEK Larnaca

Senior career*
Years	Team	Apps	(Gls)
2018	AEK Larnaca	1	(0)
2018–2020	Napoli	0	(0)
2020–2021	SPAL	0	(0)
2021–2024	AEK Larnaca	58	(1)
2024–2025	AEL Limassol	27	(1)
2025–	Sarajevo	8	(0)

International career
2017–2018	Cyprus U17	6	(1)
2018–2019	Cyprus U19	10	(0)
2020–2022	Cyprus U21	8	(0)
2021–2024	Cyprus	3	(0)
- * Club domestic league appearances and goals as of 14 December 2025

Rafail Mamas (Greek: Ραφαήλ Μάμας; born 4 March 2001) is a Cypriot professional footballer who plays as a midfielder for Bosnian Premier League club Sarajevo.

== Club career ==
On 13 May 2018, Mamas made his senior debut for AEK Larnaca, playing the full ninety minutes in a 3–2 win over AEL Limassol.

On 26 July 2018, Mamas was an unused substitute in Larnaca's 0–0 draw away to Dundalk in the UEFA Europa League but the next month, he joined Serie A club Napoli.

In September 2020, Mamas joined Serie B side SPAL.

On 19 July 2021, Mamas returned to AEK Larnaca after three years in Italy.

On 21 May 2025, AEL Limassol announced that Mamas had been sold to Premier League of Bosnia and Herzegovina side Sarajevo.

== International career ==
Mamas has represented Cyprus at under-17 level. In October 2021, he received his first call-up to the senior squad for 2022 FIFA World Cup qualifying matches against Croatia and Malta following an injury to Andreas Karo. He was an unused substitute in both matches. He made his debut on 11 November 2021 in a World Cup qualifier against Russia.

== Career statistics ==
=== Club ===
As of match played 14 December 2025

Appearances and goals by club, season and competition
Club	Season	League			National cup (Note: Includes Cypriot Cup)		Continental		Total	
Club	Season	Division	Apps	Goals	Apps	Goals	Apps	Goals	Apps	Goals
AEK Larnaca	2017–18	Cypriot First Division	1	0	—		—		1	0
AEK Larnaca	2018–19	Cypriot First Division	0	0	—		0	0	0	0
AEK Larnaca	2021–22	Cypriot First Division	24	1	5	0	—		29	1
AEK Larnaca	2022–23	Cypriot First Division	21	0	1	0	14 (Note: Two appearances in UEFA Champions League; nine appearances in UEFA Europa League; three appearances in UEFA Europa Conference League)	0	36	0
AEK Larnaca	2023–24	Cypriot First Division	13	0	2	0	3 (Note: Appearances in UEFA Conference League)	0	18	0
AEK Larnaca	Total		59	1	8	0	17	0	84	1
AEL Limassol	2024–25	Cypriot First Division	27	1	3	1	—		30	2
Sarajevo	2025–26	Bosnian Premier League	8	0	0	0	—		8	0
Career total			94	2	11	1	17	0	122	3

=== International ===
As of match played 15 October 2024

Appearances and goals by national team and year
National team	Year	Apps	Goals
Cyprus
Cyprus	2021	1	0
Cyprus	2022	1	0
Cyprus	2024	1	0
Total		3	0
