= Christos Kallis =

Cypriot footballer (born 1998)

Personal information
- Date of birth: 7 April 1998 (age 28)
- Height: 1.83 m (6 ft 0 in)
- Position: Midfielder

Team information
- Current team: Omonia Aradippou
- Number: 4

Youth career
- –2014: ASIL Lysi
- 2014–2016: APOEL

Senior career*
Years	Team	Apps	(Gls)
2016–2017	APOEL	0	(0)
2016–2017	→ Alki Oroklini (loan)	2	
2017	Alki Oroklini	2	(0)
2018	Digenis Oroklinis	14	(2)
2018–2020	Onisilos Sotira	44	(2)
2020-2021	Omonia Aradippou	33	(9)
2021	Doxa Katokopias	10	(0)
2022	Karmiotissa Polemidion	12	(2)
2022–	Omonia Aradippou	92	(3)

International career^{‡}
2014	Cyprus U-17	3	(0)
2015–2017	Cyprus U-19	13	(1)
2018–	Cyprus U-21	2	(0)
- * Club domestic league appearances and goals as of 14 June 2026 ‡ National team caps and goals as of 22:31, 28 October 2019 (UTC)

Christos Kallis (Greek: Χρίστος Καλλής; born 7 April 1998) is a Cypriot football player. who plays for Omonia Aradippou.

== Club career ==
He made his Cypriot First Division debut for Alki Oroklini on 15 October 2017 in a game against Olympiakos Nicosia.
