= André Teixeira (footballer) =

Portuguese footballer

Personal information
- Full name: André Ferreira Teixeira
- Date of birth: 14 August 1993 (age 33)
- Place of birth: Porto, Portugal
- Height: 1.82 m (6 ft 0 in)
- Position: Right-back

Team information
- Current team: Al Adalah
- Number: 4

Youth career
- 2001–2004: Candal
- 2004–2012: Porto
- 2008–2009: → Padroense (loan)

Senior career*
Years	Team	Apps	(Gls)
2012–2016	Belenenses	4	(0)
2013	→ Leixões (loan)	2	(0)
2015	→ Trofense (loan)	21	(0)
2015−2016	→ Mafra (loan)	43	(1)
2016–2017	Leixões	39	(0)
2017–2023	AEL Limassol	147	(11)
2023–2024	Hapoel Petah Tikva	13	(0)
2024	A.E. Kifisia	10	(0)
2024–2025	Anorthosis	26	(0)
2025–2026	Dinamo City	28	(3)
2026–	Al Adalah	2	(0)

International career
2008–2009	Portugal U16	6	(0)
2009–2010	Portugal U17	7	(1)
2010–2011	Portugal U18	8	(0)
2011–2012	Portugal U19	9	(0)
2012	Portugal U20	2	(0)
- * Club domestic league appearances and goals as of 00:55, 28 August 2026 (UTC)

André Ferreira Teixeira (born 14 August 1993) is a Portuguese professional footballer who plays as a right-back for Saudi First Division League club Al Adalah.

== Club career ==
=== Portugal ===
Born in Porto, Teixeira spent most of his youth in the ranks of hometown club FC Porto. In 2012 he moved to C.F. Os Belenenses, where he made his senior debut on 16 September in a 4–0 home win against F.C. Vizela in the second round of the Taça de Portugal. His Segunda Liga bow followed on 27 October in a 1–1 draw at Leixões SC.

Teixeira spent the first half of 2013–14 loaned to Leixões. On 2 February 2015, having still not made a Primeira Liga appearance for Belenenses, he was loaned back to the second division with C.D. Trofense for the rest of the season.

Teixeira was lent to C.D. Mafra in the 2015–16 campaign, their first since winning promotion as champions of the third tier. He played all but three games as they went straight back down, and scored his first professional goal on 21 November 2015 to equalise the 1–1 home draw with Vitória S.C. B.

For 2016–17, Teixeira returned to Leixões.

=== AEL Limassol ===
In the summer of 2017, Teixeira left Portugal for the first time, to join AEL Limassol of the Cypriot First Division under compatriot manager Bruno Baltazar. The team won the national cup in 2018–19, and he scored in an 8–0 (14–0 aggregate) victory over Enosis Neon THOI Lakatamia in the second round on 30 January 2019.

=== Later career ===
On 13 July 2023, Teixeira signed a two-year contract with Hapoel Petah Tikva F.C. of the Israeli Premier League. In the following transfer window, however, he moved to Super League Greece side A.E. Kifisia FC.

Teixeira joined Anorthosis Famagusta FC in July 2024, in a return to the Cypriot top flight. One year later, the 32-year-old agreed to a deal at Kategoria Superiore club FC Dinamo City.

On 13 August 2026, Teixeira joined Al Adalah Club of the Saudi First Division League.

== Honours ==
Belenenses

- Segunda Liga: 2012–13

AEL Limassol

- Cypriot Cup: 2018–19
