= Livingstone Adjin =

Ghanaian footballer

Personal information
- Full name: Livingstone Ebo Adjin
- Date of birth: 12 April 1989 (age 37)
- Place of birth: Accra, Ghana
- Height: 1.65 m (5 ft 5 in)
- Position: Midfielder

Team information
- Current team: Estudiantes de Mérida

Youth career
- Suhum Maxbees

Senior career*
Years	Team	Apps	(Gls)
2011–2013	FC AK	27	(2)
2013–2014	Tucanes de Amazonas	24	(2)
2014–2015	Doxa Katokopias	6	(0)
2015–2017	Othellos Athienou	33	(0)
2018	Trujillanos FC	27	(0)
2019–	Mineros de Guayana	0	(0)
- * Club domestic league appearances and goals as of 14:06, 27 May 2017 (UTC)

Livingstone Adjin (born 12 April 1989) is a Ghanaian footballer who plays as a midfielder for Portuguesa Fútbol Club of the Venezuelan Primera División.
