= Konstantinos Michaelides =

Cypriot footballer (born 2000)

Constantinos Michaelides
Personal information
- Full name: Konstantinos Michaelides
- Date of birth: February 6, 2000 (age 26)
- Place of birth: Limassol, Cyprus
- Position: Defender

Team information
- Current team: UCLA Bruins
- Number: 21

Youth career
- AEL Limassol

College career
Years	Team	Apps	(Gls)
2019–2022	UCLA Bruins	52	(6)
2023–	USF Dons	11	(3)

Senior career*
Years	Team	Apps	(Gls)
2018–2019	AEL Limassol	2	(0)
- * Club domestic league appearances and goals as of 12 December 2019

Konstantinos Michaelides (Greek: Κωνσταντίνος Μιχαηλίδης, born 2 February 2000) is a Cypriot footballer.

== Career ==
The defender who started his career for AEL Limassol and played in the season 2018/2019 in two league matches for AEL.

=== Collegiate ===
Ahead of the 2019 NCAA Division I men's soccer season, Michaelides signed a National Letter of Intent to play collegiate association football for the University of California, Los Angeles (UCLA) in the United States. Michaelides made his college soccer and UCLA debut on August 30, 2019, against Northwestern University and joined 2023 to San Francisco Dons.
