= Christos Gouiler =

Cypriot footballer (born 1997)

Personal information
- Date of birth: 29 June 1997 (age 29)
- Place of birth: Limassol, Cyprus
- Height: 1.71 m (5 ft 7 in)
- Position: Left-back

Youth career
- Apollon Limassol

Senior career*
Years	Team	Apps	(Gls)
2013–2017	Apollon Limassol	17	(1)
2016–2017	→ Karmiotissa (loan)	29	(1)
2017–2020	AEL Limassol	62	(1)
2020–2024	APOEL	56	(0)
2024–2025	Omonia 29M	27	(0)
2025–2026	AEL Limassol	8	(0)
2026	Olympiakos Nicosia	5	(0)

International career^{‡}
2012–2014	Cyprus U17	6	(0)
2014–2016	Cyprus U19	4	(0)
2016–2018	Cyprus U21	12	(1)
2019–	Cyprus	5	(0)
- * Club domestic league appearances and goals as of 14 June 2026 ‡ National team caps and goals as of 16 November 2022

Christos Gouiler (Greek: Χρήστος Γουίλερ; born 29 June 1997) is a Cypriot professional footballer who played as a left-back for Olympiakos Nicosia and the Cyprus national team.

== International career ==
He made his debut for Cyprus national football team on 19 November 2019 in a Euro 2020 qualifier against Belgium.
