= Nikos Englezou =

Cypriot association footballer

Personal information
- Full name: Nikolas Englezou
- Date of birth: 11 July 1993 (age 33)
- Place of birth: Limassol, Cyprus
- Height: 1.72 m (5 ft 7 1/2 in)
- Position: Left back

Team information
- Current team: Karmiotissa
- Number: 33

Youth career
- 2008–2009: Apollon Limassol
- 2009–2011: AEK Athens

Senior career*
| Years | Team | Apps | (Gls) |
| 2011–2013 | AEK Athens | 2 | (0) |
| 2012–2013 | → Nea Salamina (loan) | 20 | (2) |
| 2013–2018 | AEK Larnaca | 97 | (7) |
| 2017 | → Nea Salamina (loan) | 11 | (1) |
| 2018 | → Aris Limassol (loan) | 6 | (0) |
| 2018–2020 | Anorthosis | 24 | (1) |
| 2020–2021 | Doxa Katokopias | 34 | (2) |
| 2021–2025 | AEK Larnaca | 29 | (1) |
| 2025– | Karmiotissa | 5 | (0) |

International career^{‡}
| 2009–2012 | Cyprus U19 | 8 | (1) |
| 2012– | Cyprus U21 | 9 | (1) |
| 2015– | Cyprus | 4 | (0) |
- * Club domestic league appearances and goals as of 28 April 2025 ‡ National team caps and goals as of 17 June 2018

Nikos Englezou (Greek: Νίκος Εγγλέζου; born July 11, 1993) is a Cypriot professional footballer who plays for Karmiotissa. He is also a member of the youth national teams of Cyprus. His natural position is the left back position.

== Club career ==
=== Early career ===
Englezou started his career in the youth teams of Apollon Limassol in 2008. The following year he went on trial to English side Nottingham Forest – the trial itself was successful but Englezou decided not to move to England; he joined Greek club AEK Athens and signed a semi-professional contract for the club.

=== AEK Athens ===
He signed his first professional contract with AEK in July 2011 and followed AEK's first team during the summer's pre-season training, with his manager Manolo Jiménez praising Englezou's crossing abilities. However, he was demoted to the reserve team after pre-season is over and did not make his first team debut until a UEFA Europa League home match against Anderlecht on 1 December 2011. He made his Super League debut four months later at an away game against Doxa Drama, and played for a second time at a play-off match against Atromitos on 10 May 2012.

==== Loan to Nea Salamis ====
In summer 2012, Englezou was called up by the Cypriot National Guard for military service, so he moved to Cypriot First Division side Nea Salamina for a season-long loan in order for him to be closer at home.

==== AEK Larnaca ====
After his loan was over he returned to AEK Athens were his contract was terminated. On July 1, 2013, Englezou signed for Cypriot First Division club AEK Larnaca.

== International career ==
Englezou was a regular member to all Cyprus youth sides. On 28 March 2015 he was called up for the first time to the senior team by manager Pambos Christodoulou, for the match against Belgium.
