= Petros Psychas =

Cypriot footballer (born 1998)

Personal information
- Full name: Petros Psychas
- Date of birth: 28 August 1998 (age 28)
- Place of birth: Limassol, Cyprus
- Height: 1.78 m (5 ft 10 in)
- Position: Winger

Team information
- Current team: Karmiotissa
- Number: 21

Youth career
- 2010–2016: Apollon Limassol

Senior career*
| Years | Team | Apps | (Gls) |
| 2016–2023 | Apollon Limassol | 26 | (2) |
| 2017–2018 | → Alki Oroklini (loan) | 8 | (0) |
| 2022–2023 | → Olympiakos Nicosia (loan) | 24 | (3) |
| 2024 | Karmiotissa | 21 | (0) |
| 2024 | Doxa Katokopias | 9 | (0) |
| 2025 | PAEEK | 14 | (0) |
| 2025– | Karmiotissa | 28 | (3) |

International career^{‡}
| 2014 | Cyprus U17 | 1 | (0) |
| 2016 | Cyprus U19 | 1 | (0) |
| 2016 | Cyprus U21 | 1 | (0) |
- * Club domestic league appearances and goals as of 18 October 2026 ‡ National team caps and goals as of 18:18, 7 July 2019 (UTC)

Petros Psychas (Greek: Πέτρος Ψυχάς; born 28 August 1998) is a Cypriot footballer who currently plays as a forward for Karmiotissa.

== Club career ==
Psychas made his senior debut for Apollon against AC Omonia in May 2016, playing 90 minutes in a 2–1 victory. After a long spell out injured, he returned to the club's under 21 side in April 2017.

== Career statistics ==
=== Club ===
As of 7 July 2019.

| Club | Season | League | | | Cup | | Continental | | Other | | Total | |
| Club | Season | Division | Apps | Goals | Apps | Goals | Apps | Goals | Apps | Goals | Apps | Goals |
|---|---|---|---|---|---|---|---|---|---|---|---|---|
| Apollon Limassol | 2015–16 | Cypriot First Division | 1 | 0 | 0 | 0 | – | | 0 | 0 | 1 | 0 |
| Apollon Limassol | 2016–17 | Cypriot First Division | 2 | 0 | 0 | 0 | 0 | 0 | 0 | 0 | 2 | 0 |
| Apollon Limassol | 2017–18 | Cypriot First Division | 0 | 0 | 0 | 0 | 0 | 0 | 0 | 0 | 0 | 0 |
| Apollon Limassol | 2018–19 | Cypriot First Division | 8 | 1 | 3 (Note: Appearances in the Cypriot Cup) | 2 | 0 | 0 | 0 | 0 | 11 | 3 |
| Apollon Limassol | Total | | 11 | 1 | 3 | 2 | 0 | 0 | 0 | 0 | 14 | 3 |
| Alki Oroklini (loan) | 2017–18 | Cypriot First Division | 8 | 0 | 0 | 0 | – | | 0 | 0 | 8 | 0 |
| Career total | | | 19 | 1 | 3 | 2 | 0 | 0 | 0 | 0 | 22 | 3 |
