= List of foreign football players in Cypriot First Division =

This is a list of foreign players that have played in the Cypriot First Division. The following players:

1. have played at least one Cypriot First Division game for the respective club.
2. have been born in Cyprus and were capped by a foreign national team. This includes players who have dual citizenship with Cyprus.

The players written with bold text have at least one cap for their national team.

== Afghanistan ==
- Farshad Noor – Nea Salamina (2018–2020)
- Djelaludin Sharityar – APEP FC (2009–2010), Ethnikos Achna FC (2010–2011)

== Albania ==
- Arjan Beqaj – Anorthosis Famagusta FC (2006–2010), Olympiakos Nicosia (2010), Ermis Aradippou (2011)
- Klodian Duro – AC Omonia (2008–2009), Apollon Limassol (2009–2010)
- Ervin Fakaj – Enosis Neon Paralimni FC (2000–2001)
- Altin Haxhi – Anorthosis Famagusta FC (2005–2006), APOEL FC (2007–2010)
- Isli Hidi – Alki Larnaca FC (2008), Olympiakos Nicosia (2011), AEL Limassol (2011–2013), Apollon Limassol (2013–2016), Olympiakos Nicosia (2017–2018)
- Salvador Kaçaj – AC Omonia (1994–1997)
- Sokol Kushta – Olympiakos Nicosia (1994–1995), Ethnikos Achna FC (1995–1996)
- Qazim Laçi – APOEL FC (2016)
- Geri Malaj – Doxa Katokopias FC (2010)
- Elvir Maloku – AEK Larnaca FC (2017–2018)
- Viktor Paço – AEK Larnaca FC (1993–1995)
- Erind Prifti – AEP Paphos FC (2013)
- Blerim Rrustemi – Alki Larnaca FC (2008)
- Arjan Sheta – Ayia Napa FC (2006–2007)
- Vasil Shkurti – Aris Limassol FC (2016–2017)
- Aldo Teqja – Anorthosis Famagusta FC (2013–2014, 2015–2016)
- Geron Tocka – Olympiakos Nicosia (2024–)
- Rudi Vata – Apollon Limassol (1996–1998)
- Arjan Xhumba – Enosis Neon Paralimni FC (1998–2000)
- Roland Zajmi – Apollon Limassol (2004–2005)

== Algeria ==
- Adel Beggah – Olympiakos Nicosia (2025–2026)
- El Hedi Belameiri – Alki Oroklini (2018–2019)
- Fadel Brahami – AEP Paphos FC (2009)
- Sofyane Cherfa – AC Omonia (2011–2014), Alki Oroklini (2018–2019)
- Rafik Djebbour – APOEL FC (2014–2015)
- Aikel Gadacha – Alki Oroklini (2018–2019)
- Karim Mouzaoui – Apollon Limassol (2003–2005)
- Idir Ouali – Ethnikos Achna FC (2021)
- Nordine Sam – Nea Salamina (2008, 2009)
- Bark Seghiri – APOEL FC (2006–2009)
- Bilal Hamdi – Alki Oroklini (2017–2018), Olympiakos Nicosia (2019–2020), Doxa Katokopias FC (2021)
- Chafik Tigroudja – Alki Oroklini (2017–2018)
- Mehdi Mostefa – Pafos FC (2017–2018)
- Boussad Houche – APEP FC (2005–2006)

== Angola ==
- Aguinaldo – AEP Paphos FC (2012), Doxa Katokopias FC (2016), AEL Limassol (2016)
- Marco Airosa – AEL Limassol (2011–2018)
- Celson – Doxa Katokopias FC (2008–2009)
- Carlos Chaínho – Alki Larnaca FC (2007–2008)
- Chico Banza – Nea Salamina (2020)
- Dédé – Olympiakos Nicosia (2010–2011), AEL Limassol (2011–2014)
- Édson – Ethnikos Achna FC (2009)
- Edson Silva – Enosis Neon Paralimni FC (2015–2016)
- Freddy – Doxa Katokopias FC (2007), Enosis Neon Paralimni FC (2008), AEL Limassol (2008–2011), AC Omonia (2011–2013)
- Núrio Fortuna – AEL Limassol (2016–2017)
- Luwamo Garcia – Alki Larnaca FC (2011)
- Gilberto – AEL Limassol (2012–2013)
- Wilson Kenidy – Doxa Katokopias FC (2015–2018)
- David Kuagica – Ermis Aradippou (2018–2019)
- Diangi Matusiwa – APOP Kinyras Peyias FC (2010)
- Miguel – AEL Limassol (2013)
- Hélder Neto – Doxa Katokopias FC (2008)
- Rudy – Doxa Katokopias FC (2016–2017)
- Stélvio – Alki Larnaca FC (2013)
- Vá – Pafos FC (2019–2021)
- Francisco Zuela – APOEL FC (2012–2013)

== Australia ==
- Mustafa Amini – PAEEK FC (2021–)
- Bai Antoniou – Alki Oroklini (2018)
- Oscar Crino – Anorthosis Famagusta FC (1985–1986)
- Adam Foti – AEP Paphos FC (2004–2005), Olympiakos Nicosia (2008)
- Apostolos Giannou – AEK Larnaca FC (2018–2020)
- Dimitri Hatzimouratis – Alki Larnaca FC (2010–2011)
- Danny Invincible – Ermis Aradippou (2011)
- Tommy Oar – APOEL FC – (2017–2018)
- Paul Okon – APOEL FC – (2005–2006)
- Robert Stambolziev – Olympiakos Nicosia (2012–2013), AEK Kouklia FC (2013–2014)

== Austria ==
- Daniel Antosch – Pafos FC (2021–)
- Andreas Dober – Ethnikos Achna FC (2014)
- Armin Gremsl – Doxa Katokopias FC (2017–2020)
- Michael Haunschmid – AEL Limassol (2009–2010)
- Markus Hiden – AEL Limassol (2006–2007)
- Alfred Hörtnagl – APOEL FC (1997)
- Mladen Jutrić – Doxa Katokopias FC (2020)
- Dino Medjedovic – Aris Limassol FC (2017)
- Thomas Prager – Ethnikos Achna FC (2014–2016)
- Daniel Sikorski – Pafos FC (2017–2018), Nea Salamina (2018–2019), Aris Limassol FC (2021–)
- Mato Šimunović – Anagennisi Dherynia (2011–2012)
- David Stemmer – Anorthosis Famagusta FC (2018–2019)
- Christoph Westerthaler – APOEL FC (1997)
- Nils Zatl – Doxa Katokopias FC (2017–2019)

== Argentina ==
- Matías Abelairas – Nea Salamina (2016–2017)
- Miguel Alba – Pafos FC (2016), Ermis Aradippou (2016)
- Guillermo Álvarez – Ethnikos Achna FC (2007–2008)
- Leandro Alvarez – Apollon Limassol (2006–2007)
- Francisco Aguirre – AC Omonia (2008–2009), Aris Limassol FC (2010)
- Marcos Argüello – Anorthosis Famagusta FC (2010)
- Fernando Ávalos – Nea Salamina (2009–2010)
- Franco Bano – AEK Kouklia FC (2013–2014)
- Alejandro Barbaro – Apollon Limassol (2016), Karmiotissa FC (2017)
- Sergio Bastida – APEP FC (2005–2006), Nea Salamina (2006–2007)
- Leandro Becerra – Anorthosis Famagusta FC (2014)
- Mauro Bellone – Enosis Neon Paralimni FC (2020–2021)
- Mariano Berriex – Aris Limassol FC (2016)
- Facundo Bertoglio – APOEL FC (2016–2017)
- Daniel Blanco – Ethnikos Achna FC (2006–2008), Alki Larnaca FC (2010–2011), Ermis Aradippou (2011)
- Gonzalo Cabrera – Doxa Katokopias FC (2010), AEK Larnaca FC (2011)
- Roberto Carboni – APOP Kinyras Peyias FC (2011)
- Fernando Cavenaghi – APOEL FC (2015–2016)
- Horacio Cardozo – Apollon Limassol (2013)
- Juan Cascini – APOEL FC (2018–2019)
- Andrés Chávez – AEL Limassol (2021–)
- Israel Coll – Apollon Limassol (2021–)
- Lucas Cominelli – Ayia Napa FC (2006–2007)
- Lucas Concistre – Anorthosis Famagusta FC (2010)
- Mariano Corsico – Olympiakos Nicosia (2007–2008)
- Emanuel Dening – Enosis Neon Paralimni FC (2020–2021)
- Matias Degra – AEL Limassol (2011–2013, 2015–2016)
- Luciano De Bruno – AEL Limassol (2007–2008)
- Nicolás de Bruno – AEK Kouklia FC (2013–2014)
- Agustín De La Canal – Olympiakos Nicosia (2007)
- Gonzalo De Porras – Olympiakos Nicosia (2007)
- Tomas De Vincenti – APOEL FC (2014–2016, 2018–)
- Francisco Di Franco – AEZ Zakakiou (2016)
- Federico Domínguez – Apollon Limassol (2008)
- Federico Domínguez – Nea Salamina (2018)
- Aldo Duscher – Enosis Neon Paralimni FC (2012)
- Matías Escobar – Doxa Katokopias FC (2010), Enosis Neon Paralimni FC (2011)
- Agustín Farías – APOEL FC (2017–2018)
- Darío Fernández – Alki Larnaca FC (2011)
- Dante Formica – Ermis Aradippou (2011–2012)
- Franco Flores – Alki Oroklini (2018–2019)
- Pablo Frontini – Anorthosis Famagusta FC (2010)
- Emiliano Fusco – Alki Larnaca FC (2010–2013), Ayia Napa FC (2014–2015), Nea Salamina (2016–2018)
- Diego Galeano – Doxa Katokopias FC (2010–2011)
- Facundo García – AEK Larnaca FC (2018–2020)
- Nicolás Gianni – AEK Kouklia FC (2013)
- Juan Gill – Ermis Aradippou (2009–2011)
- Rubén Gómez – AEK Larnaca FC (2010–2012)
- Leandro Gonzalez – AC Omonia (2017)
- Nelson González – AEK Kouklia FC (2013–2014)
- Ramiro González – Alki Larnaca FC (2009)
- Silvio González – Olympiakos Nicosia (2007), AEL Limassol (2008–2011), Aris Limassol FC (2011–2012, 2015–2017)
- Francisco Guerrero – APEP FC (2009–2010)
- Andrés Imperiale – Doxa Katokopias FC (2010), Aris Limassol FC (2011)
- Julián Kmet – APOP Kinyras Peyias FC (2008)
- Maximiliano Laso – AEL Limassol (2010–2011)
- Adrián Lucero – AEK Larnaca FC (2013–2014), Enosis Neon Paralimni FC (2020–2021)
- Nicolás Martínez – Anorthosis Famagusta FC (2015–2016), Apollon Limassol (2017–2018)
- Federico Martorell – Ermis Aradippou (2010–2011)
- Franco Mazurek – AEL Limassol (2021–)
- Mauricio Mazzetti – AEK Kouklia FC (2013)
- Javier Menghini – Enosis Neon Paralimni FC (2008–2009)
- Vicente Monje – AEK Larnaca FC (2013)
- Maximiliano Oliva – Aris Limassol FC (2013–2014), Enosis Neon Paralimni FC (2018–2019)
- Emerson Panigutti – Olympiakos Nicosia (2007–2008)
- Marcelo Penta – Ethnikos Achna FC (2012–2013)
- Facundo Pereyra – Apollon Limassol (2018–2020)
- Emanuel Perrone – Anorthosis Famagusta FC (2011)
- Fabricio Poci – Ayia Napa FC (2014)
- Daniel Quinteros – Apollon Limassol (2008–2011)
- Federico Rasic – Pafos FC (2018–2020)
- Diego Rivarola – Alki Larnaca FC (2008)
- Lucas Rodríguez – Olympiakos Nicosia (2007–2008)
- Ramiro Rodríguez – Olympiakos Nicosia (2012)
- Facundo Roncaglia – Aris Limassol FC (2021–)
- Matías Roskopf – Apollon Limassol (2020)
- Esteban Sachetti – Doxa Katokopias FC (2012), AEL Limassol (2013–2015), Apollon Limassol (2015–2021)
- Sebastián Salomón – Aris Limassol FC (2010)
- José San Román – Nea Salamina (2019–2020)
- Gastón Sangoy – Apollon Limassol (2007–2010, 2013–2015), Nea Salamina (2017)
- Emmanuel Serra – Apollon Limassol (2012–2013)
- Sebastián Setti – Apollon Limassol (2012)
- Esteban Solari – APOEL FC (2005–2007, 2010–2012), Apollon Limassol (2013)
- Nicolás Stefanelli – Anorthosis Famagusta FC (2019)
- Marcelo Torres – Pafos FC (2019–2021)
- Mariano Torresi – Apollon Limassol (2007–2008)
- Emanuel Perrone – Anorthosis Famagusta FC (2011)
- Mario Vega – Anorthosis Famagusta FC (2013–2015)
- Jesús Vera – Othellos Athienou F.C. (2014–2015)
- Nicolás Villafañe – AEZ Zakakiou (2016)
- Martín Vitali – APOP Kinyras Peyias FC (2008–2010)
- Pablo Vranjicán – AEK Kouklia FC (2013–2014)
- Facundo Zabala – APOEL FC (2021–)
- Gonzalo Zárate – Enosis Neon Paralimni FC (2018–2019)
- Emilio Zelaya – Ethnikos Achna FC (2016–2017), Apollon Limassol (2017–2020)

== Armenia ==
- Armen Ambartsumyan – Doxa Katokopias FC (2007), Enosis Neon Paralimni (2008–2010)
- Edgar Babayan – Pafos FC (2021–)
- Gevorg Ghazaryan – AEL Limassol (2019–2021)
- Hovhannes Hambardzumyan – Enosis Neon Paralimni FC (2018–2020), Anorthosis Famagusta FC (2020–)
- Artem Karapetyan – Anagennisi Dherynia (2016–2017)
- Romik Khachatryan – Olympiakos Nicosia (2000–2002, 2003–2005), APOEL FC (2002–2003), Anorthosis Famagusta FC (2006–2007), APOP Kinyras Peyias FC (2008), AEP Paphos FC (2009)
- David Manoyan – Karmiotissa FC (2016–2017), Nea Salamina (2017)
- Armen Shahgeldyan – Nea Salamina (2002–2004)
- Arthur Voskanyan – Digenis Morphou (2002–2003), Ethnikos Achna FC (2003–2004)
- Taron Voskanyan – Karmiotissa FC (2016–2017), Nea Salamina (2017–2018)
- Artur Yuspashyan – Anagennisi Dherynia (2016)

== Azerbaijan ==
- Araz Abdullayev – Anorthosis Famagusta FC (2017–2018), Ethnikos Achna FC (2021–2022)

== Belgium ==
- Jordan Atheba – AEK Larnaca FC (2015)
- Ziguy Badibanga – AC Omonia (2015–2016)
- Jonathan Benteke – AC Omonia (2017)
- Christian Brüls – Pafos FC (2017–2018)
- Fangio Buyse – Doxa Katokopias FC (2007–2008), APOP Kinyras Peyias FC (2008–2010), AEP Paphos FC (2010–2011)
- Jeff Callebaut – Pafos FC (2017–2018)
- Tom Caluwé – AEK Larnaca FC (2011)
- Jens Cools – Pafos FC (2018–2019)
- Danilo – AEL Limassol (2020–2021), APOEL FC (2021–)
- Igor de Camargo – APOEL FC (2016–2018)
- Emmerik De Vriese – Ethnikos Achna FC (2015–2016), Ermis Aradippou (2016–2017)
- Jimmy De Wulf – Enosis Neon Paralimni FC (2009–2012)
- Laurent Fassotte – AEL Limassol (2007–2009), Enosis Neon Paralimni FC (2009–2011), Ermis Aradippou (2011–2012)
- Kristof Imschoot – Enosis Neon Paralimni FC (2010–2012)
- Thomas Kaminski – Anorthosis Famagusta FC (2014–2015)
- Faysel Kasmi – AC Omonia (2016)
- Victor Klonaridis – APOEL FC (2020–2021)
- Benjamin Lambot – Nea Salamina (2019–2020)
- Urko Pardo – APOEL FC (2011–2017), Alki Oroklini (2017)
- Rocky Peeters – Enosis Neon Paralimni FC (2009–2010)
- Luca Polizzi – Apollon Limassol (2017), Olympiakos Nicosia (2018), Pafos FC (2018–2019)
- Nils Schouterden – AEK Larnaca FC (2021)
- Jens Teunckens – AEK Larnaca FC (2020–2021)
- Gunter Thiebaut – AC Omonia (2001–2002)
- Matthias Trenson – Enosis Neon Paralimni FC (2010–2012)
- Kevin Van Dessel – APOP Kinyras Peyias FC (2010–2011)
- Kenneth Van Ransbeeck – Enosis Neon Paralimni FC (2015–2016)
- Dieter Van Tornhout – Enosis Neon Paralimni FC (2009–2011), Nea Salamina (2011)
- Stijn Vreven – AC Omonia (2005–2006)

== Belarus ==
- Renan Bressan – APOEL FC (2016)
- Igor Gurinovich – APEP FC (1991–1992)
- Dzyanis Palyakow – APOEL FC (2018)
- Nikolay Strizhkov – Alki Larnaca FC (2009), Ayia Napa FC (2014–2015)
- Aleksandr Vyazhevich – Nea Salamina (2000–2001)

== Bolivia ==
- Ronald García – Anorthosis Famagusta FC (2010)
- Damián Lizio – Anorthosis Famagusta FC (2010)

== Benin ==
- Khaled Adénon – Doxa Katokopias FC (2021–)
- Tidjani Anaane – Doxa Katokopias FC (2021–)
- John Glélé – APEP FC (2008–2009)
- Mickaël Poté – AC Omonia (2014–2015), APOEL FC (2017–2018)
- Félicien Singbo – AEP Paphos FC (2006–2007)

== Bosnia-Herzegovina ==
- Delimir Bajić – Olympiakos Nicosia (2011–2012)
- Bulend Biščević – AEP Paphos FC (2004)
- Vladimir Bradonjić – Ethnikos Achna FC (2023–2024) Olympiakos Nicosia (2025–)
- Azer Bušuladžić – Anorthosis Famagusta FC (2021–)
- Nemanja Đurović – Ethnikos Achna FC (2007)
- Vladan Grujić – AEP Paphos FC (2010–2011, 2012), Aris Limassol FC (2011–2012)
- Adnan Gušo – Olympiakos Nicosia (2008)
- Kenan Horić – Pafos FC (2017–2018)
- Sanel Jahić – APOEL FC (2011)
- Ivan Jolić – Anagennisi Dherynia (2011–2012)
- Dušan Kerkez – AEL Limassol (2007–2011), Aris Limassol FC (2011–2012, 2013–2014)
- Mirko Mihić – Nea Salamina (1996–2000)
- Branislav Nikić – Nea Salamina (2011), Ayia Napa FC (2012–2013)
- Mateo Marić – AC Omonia (2024–)
- Ninoslav Milenković – Enosis Neon Paralimni FC (2009–2010)
- Jovo Mišeljić – Aris Limassol FC (1995–1997, 1998), Apollon Limassol (1997–1998)
- Rade Paprica – APOP Paphos (1988–1991)
- Vedran Pelić – Anorthosis Famagusta FC (2002–2003)
- Esad Razić – AEK Larnaca FC (2007–2008)
- Semir Štilić – APOEL FC (2015–2016)
- Damir Suljanović – AEP Paphos FC (2006–2007), Ethnikos Achna FC (2007–2008)
- Nemanja Supić – Anorthosis Famagusta FC (2009)
- Nedim Tutić – AC Omonia (1992–1996), Olympiakos Nicosia (1996–1997), Ethnikos Assia (1997–1998)

== Botswana ==
- Joel Mogorosi – AEP Paphos FC (2007), APOP Kinyras Peyias FC (2008)
- Jerome Ramatlhkwane – APOP Kinyras Peyias FC (2008)

== Brazil ==
- Ailton – Pafos FC (2021–)
- Aílton – AEP Paphos FC (2006–2007)
- Aílton – APOEL FC (2010–2012)
- Airton – Ermis Aradippou (2020)
- Alan – AEK Larnaca FC (2010–2011)
- Alef – Apollon Limassol (2017–2018), APOEL FC (2019–2020)
- Alessandro Soares – Anorthosis Famagusta FC (2006–2007), Alki Larnaca FC (2007–2008)
- Alexandré Pölking – Olympiakos Nicosia (2005–2006, 2007–2008), APOEL FC (2006–2007)
- Alípio – AC Omonia (2013–2014)
- Allan – Apollon Limassol (2017–2018)
- Allyson – Ethnikos Achna FC (2012)
- Anderson – Enosis Neon Paralimni FC (2012–2013)
- Anderson Correia – Nea Salamina (2017–2020), Anorthosis Famagusta FC (2020–)
- Anderson do Ó – AEP Paphos FC (2009–2010)
- André Caldeira – AEP Paphos FC (2008–2009), AEL Limassol (2009)
- André Alves – AC Omonia (2012–2013), AEK Larnaca FC (2015–2017), Anorthosis Famagusta (2017)
- Andrezinho – AEP Paphos FC (2012)
- Alexandre – Enosis Neon Paralimni FC (2010–2011), AC Omonia (2011), AEK Larnaca FC (2012–2013), Apollon Limassol (2015–2018), AEL Limassol (2018–2019)
- Alexandre Negri – APOP Kinyras Peyias FC (2007–2009), AEK Larnaca FC (2010–2012), Doxa Katokopias FC (2012–2013, 2014–2017)
- Arcelino – Alki Larnaca FC (2007–2009)
- Arthur – AEL Limassol (2017)
- Balu – AEP Paphos FC (2012–2013)
- Guilherme Brandelli – AEK Larnaca FC (2004–2005)
- Brasília – Olympiakos Nicosia (2010)
- Breno – Nea Salamina (2020–2021)
- Bruno Arrabal – Ethnikos Achna FC (2015–2017)
- Bruno Nascimento – AC Omonia (2016–2017)
- Bruno Quadros – Alki Larnaca FC (2010)
- Bruno Rodrigues – Doxa Katokopias FC (2018)
- Bruno Santos – AEL Limassol (2020–)
- Bruno Turco – Ermis Aradippou (2015)
- Caíque – Ermis Aradippou (2020–2021)
- Caju – APOEL FC (2018–2019), Aris Limassol FC (2021–)
- Cal Rodrigues – Enosis Neon Paralimni FC (2019–2020)
- Carlão – APOEL FC (2014–2016, 2017–2019)
- Carlão – Nea Salamina (2018), Doxa Katokopias FC (2019)
- Carlos André – Olympiakos Nicosia (2011)
- Carlos Dias – APOEL FC (2020–2021), PAEEK FC (2021–)
- Cássio – AEL Limassol (2013)
- César Santin – APOEL FC (2014)
- Césinha – Ermis Aradippou (2013–2014)
- Cesinha – Olympiakos Nicosia (2012–2013)
- Clayton – Alki Larnaca FC (2007–2008), AC Omonia (2008), AEL Limassol (2009–2010)
- Cleyton – AC Omonia (2016–2017)
- Charles da Silva – Ermis Aradippou (2015)
- Christian – APOEL FC (2013)
- Danilo – Nea Salamina (2020–2021)
- Danilo Bueno – AEL Limassol (2016)
- Danielson – AC Omonia (2012–2013)
- Danielzinho – AEL Limassol (2014)
- David – Doxa Katokopias FC (2007–2008), Apollon Limassol (2008–2009), Ethnikos Achna FC (2009–2010)
- David Luiz – Pafos FC – (2025–)
- Davidson – AC Omonia (2009–2011)
- Dellatorre – APOEL FC (2018–2019)
- Denilson – AEL Limassol (2018)
- Deyvison – Ethnikos Achna FC (2019–2021)
- De Abreu – Olympiakos Nicosia (2010)
- Dimitri – Alki Larnaca FC (2009)
- Diego Barcelos – AEL Limassol (2014)
- Diego Gaúcho – AEL Limassol (2013)
- Diogo Melo – Ermis Aradippou (2013)
- Douglão – Anorthosis Famagusta FC (2017–2019)
- Douglas – Aris Limassol FC (2013–2014, 2015–2016), AEZ Zakakiou (2016–2017)
- Douglas Aurélio – Pafos FC (2021–)
- Dudú – Nea Salamina (2017)
- Dudu Paraíba – Apollon Limassol (2016–2017)
- Éder – Nea Salamina (2013–2015)
- Edmar – Doxa Katokopias FC (2007, 2015–2017), Enosis Neon Paralimni FC (2007–2010), Alki Larnaca FC (2010–2011), AEL Limassol (2011–2015)
- Edu Valinhos – Ethnikos Achna FC (2008)
- Eduardo Pinceli – Ethnikos Achna FC (2009–2012, 2014–2017), Nea Salamina (2012), Alki Larnaca FC (2013), Aris Limassol FC (2014)
- Eduardo Marques – APOP Kinyras Peyias FC (2008–2009), Aris Limassol FC (2009), AEP Paphos FC (2010–2011)
- Edvaldo – AEK Larnaca FC (1998–1999)
- Elias – Ermis Aradippou (2011)
- Eli Marques – AEL Limassol (2011)
- Elinton Andrade – Ermis Aradippou (2013)
- Elízio – Apollon Limassol (2015–2016)
- Elton – Apollon Limassol (2015)
- Emerson – APOEL FC (2007)
- Endrick – AEZ Zakakiou (2016)
- Euller – AEL Limassol (2020–)
- Evair – AEK Larnaca FC (1998–1999)
- Evandro – APEP FC (2005–2006), Ayia Napa FC (2006–2007)
- Evandro Roncatto – Ermis Aradippou (2010–2011), Anorthosis Famagusta FC (2011–2013)
- Everton – Ethnikos Achna FC (2014–2016)
- Evilásio – APOEL FC (2007)
- Ewandro – AC Omonia (2024–)
- Fabinho – Anorthosis Famagusta FC (2006–2008), Ermis Aradippou (2010)
- Fabrício – Alki Oroklini (2017–2018)
- Fabrício – AC Omonia (2017)
- Farley Rosa – Apollon Limassol (2014–2015), AEK Larnaca FC (2016)
- Felipe – Doxa Katokopias FC (2012)
- Felipe Macedo – PAEEK FC (2021–)
- Fillip – APOP Kinyras Peyias FC (2009–2010)
- Francisco Neri – Enosis Neon Paralimni FC (2007)
- Freire – Apollon Limassol (2015–2016)
- Gabriel – Anorthosis Famagusta FC (2015–2017)
- Gabriel Lima – APOP Kinyras Peyias FC (2007–2008), Alki Larnaca FC (2008–2009, AEP Paphos FC (2009), Doxa Katokopias FC (2010)
- George – Ayia Napa FC (2012–2013)
- Gilvan – Doxa Katokopias FC (2009–2011)
- Gelson – APEP FC (2008–2010), Ethnikos Achna FC (2010–2011), Aris Limassol FC (2011–2012)
- Gleison – AEL Limassol (2004–2005), Doxa Katokopias FC (2013–2014), Nea Salamina (2014–2015)
- Gott – Aris Limassol FC (2016–2017)
- Guilherme – AC Omonia (2007), Ethnikos Achna FC (2008), Atromitos Yeroskipou (2008), APOP Kinyras Peyias FC (2009), Ermis Aradippou (2009–2010)
- Guilherme Choco – APOEL FC (2015)
- Guilherme de Paula – Ethnikos Achna FC (2016)
- Guilherme Santos – Anorthosis Famagusta FC (2016–2017)
- Gustavo – Olympiakos Nicosia (2020–)
- Gustavo Manduca – APOEL FC (2010–2015)
- Hugo – APOP Kinyras Peyias FC (2005)
- Hugo Cabral – Ermis Aradippou (2020)
- Ibson – Ethnikos Achna FC (2014–2015), Ayia Napa FC (2015), Pafos FC (2016), Ermis Aradippou (2016–2017)
- Igor Silva – AEK Larnaca FC (2018–2019)
- Índio – Ermis Aradippou (2018–2019)
- Ítalo – Doxa Katokopias FC (2019–2020)
- Ivan Carlos – Alki Oroklini (2018–2019), AEL Limassol (2019)
- Jackson – APOP Kinyras Peyias FC (2007)
- Jaílson – AC Omonia (2017–2018), Nea Salamina (2018–2019)
- Jaílson – Ermis Aradippou (2010)
- Jairo – Pafos FC (2021–)
- Jander – Apollon Limassol (2017–2018), Pafos FC (2018–2019)
- James Dens – Alki Larnaca FC (2012–2013)
- Jean Felipe – Olympiakos Nicosia (2026–)
- Jean Paulista – APOEL FC (2008–2010), AEK Larnaca FC (2010)
- Jefferson – APEP FC (2005–2006), Ayia Napa FC (2006–2007)
- João Guilherme – APOEL FC (2013–2016)
- João Leonardo – Doxa Katokopias FC (2012–2017), Aris Limassol FC (2017)
- João Victor – Anorthosis Famagusta FC (2015–2019)
- Jocivalter – Alki Larnaca FC (2007–2008), Atromitos Yeroskipou (2008–2009)
- Joeano – Ermis Aradippou (2009–2011)
- Jonatan – Ermis Aradippou (2020)
- Jonathan Balotelli – Enosis Neon Paralimni FC (2020–2021)
- Jone – Ethnikos Achna FC (2014)
- José de Souza – Ayia Napa FC (2006–2007), Nea Salamina (2008), Atromitos Yeroskipou (2008–2009), Nea Salamina (2009–2010)
- Jonatas Belusso – Ermis Aradippou (2014)
- Jorginho – Doxa Katokopias FC (2020)
- Juan Felipe – Enosis Neon Paralimni FC (2020–2021)
- Juliano Spadacio – Anorthosis Famagusta FC (2012–2013)
- Juninho – Ethnikos Achna FC (2014–2015)
- Juninho – Ethnikos Achna FC (2016)
- Kaká – AC Omonia (2010), APOEL FC (2011–2012, 2014–2015)
- Kanu – AC Omonia (2017–2018)
- Kássio – AEK Larnaca FC (2007–2009), Ethnikos Achna FC (2009–2012)
- Leandro – Doxa Katokopias FC (2013–2014)
- Leandro Silva – Doxa Katokopias FC (2012–2013, 2015–2016), Nea Salamina (2014–2015)
- Leandro Naldoni – Alki Larnaca FC (2008)
- Leandro Pinto – Doxa Katokopias FC (2017)
- Léo Natel – APOEL FC (2018–2019, 2021–)
- Leonardo – Enosis Neon Paralimni FC (2012)
- Leonardo Oliveira – Olympiakos Nicosia (2007), AEP Paphos FC (2008)
- Liliu – Ethnikos Achna FC (2013), Nea Salamina (2016)
- Lorran – Pafos FC (2018–2019)
- Lucas Souza – AEL Limassol (2016–2017), APOEL FC (2017–2020, 2021–)
- Luciano Amaral – Apollon Limassol (2011)
- Luciano – AEL Limassol (2002–2004)
- Luciano Bebê – AEL Limassol (2011–2015), AC Omonia (2015–2016), Nea Salamina (2016–2017)
- Lukas Brambilla – Doxa Katokopias FC (2019–2020)
- Lulinha – Pafos FC (2018–2020)
- Luís Carlos Lima – Doxa Katokopias FC (2017–2021)
- Luiz Fernando – Doxa Katokopias FC (2014)
- Magno – AC Omonia (2005–2008), AEK Larnaca FC (2008–2009)
- Marcelo Oliveira – APOEL FC (2011–2014)
- Marcelo Pletsch – AC Omonia (2008–2009)
- Marcinho – APOEL FC (2010–2012)
- Marcio Ferreira – APOP Kinyras Peyias FC (2007–2009), Aris Limassol FC (2009–2010)
- Marco Aurélio – Olympiakos Nicosia (2011–2012), Ethnikos Achna FC (2012–2014), Nea Salamina (2014–2015), Aris Limassol FC (2015–2016, 2017), AEZ Zakakiou (2016)
- Marco Brito – APOEL FC (2003–2004)
- Marcos dos Santos – Ayia Napa FC (2014)
- Marcos Tavares – APOEL FC (2007)
- Marcelo – AEK Larnaca FC (2008), Ethnikos Achna FC (2009–2010)
- Mário Jardel – Anorthosis Famagusta FC (2007)
- Marlon Silva – Alki Oroklini (2018)
- Matheus Ludescher – Alki Larnaca FC (2009), Nea Salamina (2009)
- Maurício Cordeiro – Nea Salamina (2019–2020)
- Maurício – Olympiakos Nicosia (2024–)
- Maykon – AEL Limassol (2012–2013)
- Mércio – Olympiakos Nicosia (2010–2012), AEK Larnaca FC (2013)
- Muller Fernandes – Ermis Aradippou (2016)
- Nando – PAEEK FC (2021–)
- Nelsinho – Doxa Katokopias FC (2018–2019, 2020)
- Neuton – Doxa Katokopias FC (2017–2018)
- Packer – Ermis Aradippou (2014)
- Paquito – Enosis Neon Paralimni FC (2007–2008)
- Paulinho – AEK Larnaca FC (1998–1999)
- Paulinho – Olympiakos Nicosia (2010–2012), Apollon Limassol (2012–2013), Ermis Aradippou (2013–2015), Doxa Katokopias FC (2015–2017)
- Paulinho Carioca – Aris Limassol FC (2009)
- Paulo Sérgio – Ayia Napa FC (2012–2013), AEK Kouklia FC (2014)
- Paulo Vinícius – Apollon Limassol (2016–2017)
- Paulo Vogt – APEP FC (2008–2009)
- Pepe – Alki Larnaca FC (2009)
- Peris – Apollon Limassol (2009–2010)
- Rafael Jaques – APOP Kinyras Peyias FC (2008–2009)
- Rafael Ledesma – Ethnikos Achna FC (2013–2014)
- Rafael Santos – APOEL FC (2020–)
- Rafinha – Ermis Aradippou (2020–2021)
- Reinaldo – ENTHOI Lakatamia FC (2005–2006)
- Ricardo Lobo – Doxa Katokopias FC (2013–2014, 2015–2016)
- Ricardo Malzoni – Aris Limassol FC (2011)
- Roberto Brum – Alki Larnaca FC (2011)
- Roberto Dias – Ermis Aradippou (2020–2021)
- Rodrigo – Doxa Katokopias FC (2008–2010), Olympiakos Nicosia (2010–2011), Nea Salamis Famagusta FC (2012)
- Rodrigo Posso – Ermis Aradippou (2009–2010)
- Rodrigo Silva – Nea Salamina (2010)
- Rogério – Aris Limassol FC (2016–2017)
- Roma – Doxa Katokopias FC (2009–2010)
- Romão – AEZ Zakakiou (2016)
- Robson – Ayia Napa FC (2012)
- Rômulo – Ayia Napa FC (2014)
- Rubens – APOEL FC (2007)
- Samuel Araújo – Ethnikos Achna FC (2015–2016)
- Saulo – AEP Paphos FC (2012)
- Sávio – Anorthosis Famagusta FC (2008–2009)
- Sidnei – Enosis Neon Paralimni FC (2011), Alki Larnaca FC (2012–2013)
- Silva – Alki Larnaca FC (2007–2008), AEK Larnaca FC (2009)
- Serginho – AC Omonia (2014)
- Serginho – Nea Salamina (2009–2010)
- Serjão – Doxa Katokopias FC (2008–2009), AEL Limassol (2009–2010), Alki Larnaca FC (2010–2011), Ermis Aradippou (2011), Ethnikos Achna FC (2012), AEP Paphos FC (2012–2013)
- Thiago Ferreira – AEP Paphos FC (2010–2011), Othellos Athienou FC (2014–2015), Nea Salamina (2018–2019), AC Omonia (2019–2020), AEK Larnaca FC (2021–)
- Thiago Sales – Apollon Limassol (2009–2010, 2012)
- Tiago Azulão – Olympiakos Nicosia (2019–2020)
- Tiago Leonço – AEL Limassol (2017)
- Thuram – Aris Limassol FC (2013–2014), Apollon Limassol (2014–2016)
- Tinga – APOP Kinyras Peyias FC (2007–2008), AEP Paphos FC (2008–2010)
- Tininho – AEK Larnaca FC (2007–2008)
- Tuta – APOP Kinyras Peyias FC (2007–2008)
- Vander – AEK Larnaca FC (2014–2015), APOEL FC (2015–2017)
- Valdo – Ethnikos Achna FC (2014–2015), Pafos FC (2018)
- Veridiano Marcelo – APOEL FC (1998–2000)
- Vinícius – APOEL FC (2013–2018), Olympiakos Nicosia (2019–2020), Nea Salamina (2020–2021)
- Wellington – AEL Limassol (2015)
- Wellington – Apollon Limassol (2021–)
- Wender – Ermis Aradippou (2009–2011), Ethnikos Achna FC (2011–2012)
- Wesley Dias – Ermis Aradippou (2020)
- William Boaventura – AEL Limassol (2004–2005), Anorthosis Famagusta FC (2005–2008, 2012), APOEL FC (2010–2012)
- William Soares – AC Omonia (2017–2018)
- Zé Carlos – APOEL FC (2007–2008)
- Zé Elias – AC Omonia (2006–2007)

== Bulgaria ==
- Atanas Aleksandrov – Omonia Aradippou (1982–1983)
- Stanislav Angelov – Anorthosis Famagusta FC (2011–2012)
- Nikolay Arabov – Anagennisi Dherynia (1987–1988)
- Milen Bakardjiev – AC Omonia (1989–1990)
- Ivan Bandalovski – Anorthosis Famagusta FC (2017)
- Todor Barzov – Apollon Limassol (1986–1987)
- Kostadin Bashov – Alki Larnaca FC (2010–2012), AEP Paphos FC (2013), Enosis Neon Paralimni FC (2015–2016)
- Krasimir Borisov – AC Omonia (1983–1984)
- Atanas Bornosuzov – Aris Limassol FC (2007–2008)
- Georgi Denev – Aris Limassol FC (1981–1983)
- Metodi Deyanov – Anorthosis Famagusta FC (2007–2008)
- Georgi Donkov – Enosis Neon Paralimni FC (2002–2003)
- Spas Dzhevizov – AC Omonia (1984–1987)
- Filip Filipov – Ethnikos Achna FC (2016–2018)
- Hristian Foti – AC Omonia (2018–2019), Olympiakos Nicosia (2021–)
- Vladimir Gadzhev – Anorthosis Famagusta FC (2017–2018)
- Stanislav Genchev – AEL Limassol (2014)
- Rumyancho Goranov – APOEL FC (1982–1989)
- Slavcho Horozov – Omonia Aradippou (1988–1989)
- Yordan Hristov – Ermis Aradippou (2016–2017)
- Ilian Iliev – Apollon Limassol (2021–)
- Valentin Ignatov – Anorthosis Famagusta FC (1995–1996)
- Iordan Iordanov – Anorthosis Famagusta FC (1983–1984)
- Ventsislav Ivanov – AEP Paphos FC (2010–2011)
- Zoran Janković – Ethnikos Achna FC (2008)
- Mario Kirev – Nea Salamina (2017–2018), Olympiakos Nicosia (2019–)
- Ilian Kiriakov – Anorthosis Famagusta FC (1995–1996)
- Rosen Kirilov – APOP Kinyras Peyias FC (2007–2008)
- Bozhil Kolev – AC Omonia (1981–1982)
- Nikolay Kostov – Anorthosis Famagusta FC (1990–1993)
- Stanislav Kostov – Olympiakos Nicosia (2020–2021)
- Todor Kyuchukov – Nea Salamina (2007–2008)
- Plamen Krachunov – Ethnikos Achna FC (2016–2017)
- Stefan Lahchiev – AC Omonia (1987–1988)
- Dimitar Makriev – Nea Salamina (2015–2018), Ermis Aradippou (2019)
- Krasimir Manolov – Alki Larnaca FC (1985–1988)
- Veselin Marchev – Ayia Napa FC (2014–2015), Nea Salamina (2015)
- Marquinhos – Anorthosis Famagusta FC (2011–2012)
- Atanas Mihaylov – Nea Salamina (1981–1982)
- Nikolay Mihaylov – AC Omonia (2017–2018)
- Zhivko Milanov – APOEL FC (2016–2019)
- Vasil Panayotov – Ayia Napa FC (2014–2015)
- Dimitar Petkov – Aris Limassol FC (2013)
- Georgi Petkov – Enosis Neon Paralimni FC (2011–2012)
- Yordan Petkov – Ermis Aradippou (2011)
- Ivaylo Petrov – AEK Larnaca FC (2008)
- Yasen Petrov – Alki Larnaca FC (1999–2000)
- Nikolay Rusev – Anagennisi Dherynia (1983–1986), APEP FC (1986–1989)
- Zahari Sirakov – APOEL FC (2002–2003)
- Traiko Sokolov – AC Omonia (1982–1984)
- Simeon Slavchev – Apollon Limassol (2015–2016)
- Emil Spasov – AC Omonia (1987–1988)
- Radostin Stanev- Aris Limassol FC (2007)
- Orlin Starokin – Alki Oroklini (2018–2019), Enosis Neon Paralimni FC (2019–2020)
- Borislav Stoychev – Ethnikos Achna FC (2016–2018)
- Angel Stoykov – Nea Salamina (2007–2008)
- Zvetomir Tchipev – Nea Salamina (2007–2008)
- Nikolay Todorov – Anorthosis Famagusta FC (1995–1996)
- Igor Tomašić – Anorthosis Famagusta FC (2011–2012)
- Radoslav Vasilev – Alki Oroklini (2017)
- Ventsislav Vasilev – Aris Limassol FC (2010, 2011)
- Ventsislav Velinov – Apollon Limassol (2007–2008)
- Hristo Yovov – Aris Limassol FC (2007–2008), Apollon Limassol (2008)
- Adalbert Zafirov – Anagennisi Dherynia (2003–2004)
- Petar Zehtinski – AC Omonia (1986–1987)

== Burkina Faso ==
- Steeve Yago – Aris Limassol FC (2021–)
- Stephane Aziz Ki – AC Omonia (2017–2018), Aris Limassol FC (2018), Nea Salamina (2018–2019)
- Abdul Diallo – AEP Paphos FC (2010)
- Mohamed Kone – Karmiotissa FC (2016–2017)
- Issouf Ouattara – Ermis Aradippou (2015)
- Dylan Ouédraogo – Apollon Limassol (2018–2019)
- Blati Touré – AC Omonia (2016–2017)

== Cameroon ==
- Hervé Bodiong – Pafos FC (2015–2016), Nea Salamina (2020)
- Nicolas Dikoume – Doxa Katokopias FC (2001–2002), Ethnikos Achna FC (2002–2003)
- Arnaud Djoum – Apollon Limassol (2021–)
- Pierre Ebéde – AEL Limassol (2008–2009)
- Charles Eloundou – Nea Salamina (2018–2020), Anorthosis Famagusta FC (2020–2021), Ethnikos Achna FC (2021–)
- Richard Emmanuel Njoh – Doxa Katokopias FC (2014–2015)
- Eyong Enoh – Enosis Neon Paralimni FC (2018–2019), Olympiakos Nicosia (2019–2020)
- Lewis Enoh – PAEEK FC (2021–)
- Marcel Essombé – Ermis Aradippou FC (2018)
- Marcelin Gando – Enosis Neon Paralimni FC (2021)
- Serge Honi – Alki Larnaca FC (1998–1999), Olympiakos Nicosia (1999–2000), AEK Larnaca FC (2000–2001)
- Fabrice Kah – Olympiakos Nicosia (2019–)
- Emmanuel Kenmogne – Olympiakos Nicosia (2010–2012), Ethnikos Achna FC (2012–2013)
- Ibrahim Koneh – Ethnikos Achna FC (2019–2021)
- Landry – Olympiakos Nicosia (2019)
- Patrick Leugueun – AEL Limassol (2011)
- Raoul Loé – AC Omonia (2018–2019)
- Carl Lombé – Aris Limassol FC (2008, 2009–2010, 2011–2012)
- Joslain Mayebi – AEK Larnaca FC (2008)
- Éric Matoukou – Pafos FC (2016)
- Justin Mengolo – AC Omonia (2013–2014), Nea Salamina (2014)
- François Mughe – AEL Limassol (2026-)
- Jean-Paul Ndeki – AEP Paphos FC (2010–2011)
- Evariste Ngolok – Aris Limassol FC (2017–2018)
- Gilles Ngomo – Alki Oroklini (2017–2018)
- Roland Ojong – APOP Kinyras Peyias FC (2009–2010)
- Fabrice Olinga – Apollon Limassol (2014)
- Gilbert N'Djema – Aris Limassol FC (2007–2008, 2009–2010, 2011–2012)
- Hervé Onana – Enosis Neon Paralimni FC (2011)
- Njongo Priso – AEK Larnaca FC (2010–2011)
- Edgar Salli – Olympiakos Nicosia (2021–)

== Canada ==
- Daniel Haber – Apollon Limassol (2013–2014), Ayia Napa FC (2014–2015)
- Michael Klukowski – APOEL FC (2012–2013)
- Issey Nakajima-Farran – AEK Larnaca FC (2012), Alki Larnaca FC (2013)

== Cape Verde ==
- Babanco – AEL Limassol (2016)
- Bruno Leite – Pafos FC (2021–)
- Jerson Cabral – Pafos FC (2019–2021)
- Cafú – AC Omonia (2008–2009), Anorthosis Famagusta FC (2009–2011), AEL Limassol (2011–2012), Alki Larnaca FC (2012–2013)
- Carlitos – AEL Limassol (2011–2015), AC Omonia (2016–2017)
- Paulo de Pina – Olympiakos Nicosia (2011–2013), Ermis Aradippou (2013–2016)
- Dady – Apollon Limassol (2012)
- Delmiro – Aris Limassol FC (2021–)
- Helton Dos Reis – Apollon Limassol (2011)
- Edson – Aris Limassol FC (2013–2014)
- Elber Evora – AEL Limassol (2021–)
- Ernesto – Doxa Katokopias FC (2008–2009)
- José Emílio Furtado – Anagennisi Dherynia (2016–2017)
- Thierry Graça – Doxa Katokopias FC (2020)
- Hernâni – Alki Larnaca FC (2007)
- Janício – Anorthosis Famagusta FC (2009–2012)
- José Semedo – APOP Kinyras Peyias FC (2009–2010), Apollon Limassol (2010–2011), Enosis Neon Paralimni FC (2011–2012), Nea Salamina (2012)
- Kay – AC Omonia (2017–2018)
- Kévin Oliveira – Doxa Katokopias FC (2020–)
- Mateus – Doxa Katokopias FC (2009)
- Jimmy Modeste – AEP Paphos FC (2010–2011), Nea Salamina (2011–2013)
- Néné – Enosis Neon Paralimni FC (2008)
- Nilton – Ethnikos Achna FC (2007)
- Nilson – AEL Limassol (2011–2012), Doxa Katokopias FC (2014–2015)
- Pedro Moreira – Nea Salamina (2012)
- Platini – AC Omonia (2013–2014)
- Puma – Aris Limassol FC (2007–2008), Enosis Neon Paralimni FC (2008)
- Marco Soares – AC Omonia (2012–2014), AEL Limassol (2015–2018)
- Lisandro Semedo – AEZ Zakakiou (2016–2017)
- Sérgio Semedo – Apollon Limassol (2017)
- Willy Semedo – Alki Oroklini (2017–2018), Pafos FC (2021–)
- Spencer – Doxa Katokopias FC (2009)
- Toy – Doxa Katokopias FC (2012–2013)
- Nélson Veiga – AC Omonia (2006–2008), AEK Larnaca FC (2008–2009)
- Vozinha – AEL Limassol (2017–)

== Central African Republic ==
- Cédric Yambéré – APOEL FC (2017)

== Chile ==
- Pedro Campos – Olympiakos Nicosia (2020)
- Nicolás Corvetto – AEL Limassol (2011)
- Lucas Domínguez – Pafos FC (2017–2018)
- Sebastián González – APOP Kinyras Peyias FC (2009–2010)
- Mauricio Pinilla – Apollon Limassol (2009)
- Alex Von Schwedler – Alki Larnaca FC (2007–2008)
- Jason Silva – Apollon Limassol (2017–2018)

== Colombia ==
- Brayan Angulo – Pafos FC (2018–2019, 2020–2021)
- Roger Cañas – APOEL FC (2017)
- Jairo Castillo – AEL Limassol (2007)
- Yair Castro – Doxa Katokopias FC (2016–2018), Ethnikos Achna FC (2018)
- Oscar Alvarado – Aris Limassol FC (2017)
- Ricardo Laborde – Anorthosis Famagusta FC (2010–2013, 2018–2019)
- David Mena – Apollon Limassol (2013–2014), Ayia Napa FC (2014–2015)
- Jhon Obregón – Ethnikos Achna FC (2015)
- Michael Ortega – AC Omonia (2019–2020)
- Jeisson Palacios – Pafos FC (2021–)
- Luis Arturo Peralta – Doxa Katokopias FC (2016)
- Harold Reina – AEK Larnaca FC (2013), Apollon Limassol (2014)
- Hámilton Ricard – APOEL FC (2004–2005)
- Rodrigo Rivas – Doxa Katokopias FC (2016), Anagennisi Dherynia (2017)
- Juan Camilo Saiz – Pafos FC (2020–2021)
- David Solari – AEP Paphos FC (2010–2011), Alki Larnaca FC (2011)

== Comoros ==
- Fouad Bachirou – AC Omonia (2021–)

== Congo ==
- Lucien Aubey – Olympiakos Nicosia (2012)
- Bernard Itoua – Ermis Aradippou (2017–2018)
- Rahavi Kifouéti – Doxa Katokopias FC (2017–2018)
- Francis N'Ganga – Ermis Aradippou (2019)
- Juvhel Tsoumou – Ermis Aradippou (2017–2018)

== Congo DR ==
- Jean-Paul Boeka-Lisasi – AEL Limassol (2003–2004)
- Katanga Kibikula – APEP FC (2005–2006)
- Papi Kimoto – Atromitos Yeroskipou (2009)
- Fabrice Lokembo-Lokaso – Enosis Neon Paralimni FC (2006–2007), Olympiakos Nicosia (2007)
- Lomana Lua Lua – AC Omonia (2010–2011)
- Mike Mampuya – Doxa Katokopias FC (2010–2011), Enosis Neon Paralimni FC (2011–2012)
- Jessy Mayele – Ermis Aradippou (2015–2016)
- Pieter Mbemba – AC Omonia (2013)
- Dieumerci Ndongala – APOEL FC (2020–)
- Jeff Tutuana – Enosis Neon Paralimni FC (2006–2008)
- Yannick Yenga – Ermis Aradippou (2015–2016)

== Costa Rica ==
- Steven Bryce – Anorthosis Famagusta (2005–2006)
- Rónald Gómez – APOEL FC (2006–2007)
- David Ramírez – AC Omonia (2018–2019)
- Gonzalo Segares – Apollon Limassol (2010)
- '''Diego Mesén''' – Doxa Katokopias (2022)

== Croatia ==
- Adnan Aganović – AEL Limassol (2016, 2019–2020)
- Robert Alviž – Anagennisi Dherynia (2011–2012)
- Ivan Antolek – AEK Larnaca FC (2012), Ayia Napa FC (2015–2016)
- Ivan Babić – Ethnikos Achna FC (2011–2012)
- Matko Babić – AEL Limassol (2020–2021), PAEEK FC (2021–)
- Stjepan Babić – Ethnikos Achna FC (2020)
- Boris Bjelkanović – APEP FC (2008), Atromitos Yeroskipou (2009)
- Luka Bogdan – AEL Limassol (2025–)
- Mario Budimir – APOEL FC (2012–2013), Enosis Neon Paralimni FC (2015–2016)
- Vinko Buden – Ethnikos Achna FC (2013)
- Ivan Ćurjurić – Nea Salamina (2013–2014, 2015–2017), Ayia Napa FC (2015)
- Petar Đurin – Apollon Limassol (2021–)
- Jan Doležal – Ethnikos Achna FC (2020–)
- Dalibor Filipović – AEL Limassol (2002–2003)
- Ivan Fiolić – AEK Larnaca FC (2019–2020)
- Ivan Fuštar – Nea Salamina (2018–2020)
- Igor Gal – Enosis Neon Paralimni FC (2013)
- Nikola Gatarić – Ermis Aradippou (2021)
- Dino Gavrić – Enosis Neon Paralimni FC (2013–2014)
- Dominik Glavina – Enosis Neon Paralimni FC (2019)
- Toni Gorupec – Ethnikos Achna FC (2020–)
- Jurica Grgec – Pafos FC (2015–2016)
- Jure Guvo – Enosis Neon Paralimni FC (2002–2003)
- Antonio Jakoliš – Apollon Limassol (2017–2018), APOEL FC (2019–2020)
- Franko Kovačević – Pafos FC (2021–)
- Krešimir Kovačević – Ermis Aradippou (2021)
- Marijan Kovačević – Enosis Neon Paralimni FC (2002–2003)
- Ardian Kozniku – APOEL FC (1997)
- Dario Krešić – AC Omonia (2016–2017)
- Tomas Maricic – Anagennisi Dherynia (2016)
- Anton Maglica – Apollon Limassol (2016–2019), APOEL FC (2021–)
- Dejan Mezga – Apollon Limassol (2015–2016)
- Hrvoje Miličević – AEK Larnaca FC (2021–)
- Igor Musa – AEL Limassol (2007–2008)
- Marin Oršulić – AC Omonia (2016–2017)
- Martin Pajić – Pafos FC (2021–)
- Antun Palić – AEK Larnaca FC (2012–2013)
- Ivan Parlov – Apollon Limassol (2012–2013)
- Vilim Posinković – AEZ Zakakiou (2017)
- Danijel Pranjić – Anorthosis Famagusta FC (2017–2019)
- Franjo Prce – AC Omonia (2018–2019)
- Davor Rogač – Ethnikos Achna FC (2017–2018)
- Ante Roguljić – Pafos FC (2017–2018)
- Ivan Runje – AC Omonia (2015–2016)
- Krševan Santini – Enosis Neon Paralimni FC (2016)
- Marko Šarlija – Ethnikos Achna FC (2012–2013)
- Gordon Schildenfeld – Anorthosis Famagusta FC (2017–2021), Aris Limassol FC (2021–)
- Ernad Skulić – Ethnikos Achna FC (2013)
- Dino Škvorc – Nea Salamina (2013–2014)
- Martin Šlogar – Aris Limassol FC (2021–)
- Robert Špehar – AC Omonia (2004–2005)
- Sandro Tomić – Nea Salamina (2009–2010)
- Ivan Udarević – APOEL FC (2004–2005)
- Ivan Vargić – Anorthosis Famagusta FC (2018–2019)
- Branko Vrgoč – Anorthosis Famagusta FC (2019–2021)
- Diego Živulić – Pafos FC (2018–2019)

== Cuba ==
- Christian Joel – AEK Larnaca FC (2021–)

== Curaçao ==
- Jarchinio Antonia – AC Omonia (2017–2018), AEL Limassol (2019)
- Charlison Benschop – Apollon Limassol (2020–2021)
- Boy Deul – Pafos FC (2017–2018)
- Elson Hooi – Ermis Aradippou (2016)
- Rangelo Janga – Apollon Limassol (2021–)
- Dustley Mulder – Apollon Limassol (2014)
- Gino van Kessel – Olympiakos Nicosia (2020–2021)

== Czech Republic ==
- Martin Abraham – AEK Larnaca FC (2008)
- Miloš Beznoska – Enosis Neon Paralimni FC (1990–1991)
- Jiří Bobok – AEK Larnaca FC (2008–2009)
- Aleš Chvalovský – Apollon Limassol (2006–2012)
- Pavel Čmovš – Nea Salamina (2020–2021)
- Martin Čupr – AEP Paphos FC (2006–2007)
- Radek Dejmek – Pafos FC (2018–2019)
- Gejza Farkaš – AEL Limassol (1984–1985)
- Dušan Fitzel – EPA Larnaca (1992–1994)
- Zdeněk Folprecht – Pafos FC (2018–2019, 2020), Ermis Aradippou (2021), Ethnikos Achna FC (2021–)
- Ludevít Grmela – AEL Limassol (1990–1991)
- Dušan Horváth – EPA Larnaca (1992–1994)
- Josef Hušbauer – Anorthosis Famagusta FC (2020–)
- David Kobylík – AC Omonia (2008–2009)
- Martin Kolář – AEP Paphos FC (2009–2010), Apollon Limassol (2010–2012)
- Zdeněk Koukal – AC Omonia (1990–1991)
- Miroslav Kouřil – Evagoras Paphos (1992–1993)
- Milan Kerbr – Apollon Limassol (2019)
- Tomáš Kuchař – Aris Limassol FC (2005–2007)
- Josef Kvída – Pafos FC (2021–)
- Vladislav Lauda – AEL Limassol (1987–1988)
- Jan Lecjaks – AC Omonia (2019–)
- Michael Lüftner – AC Omonia (2019–2021)
- Jiří Mašek – Nea Salamina (2009), APOP Kinyras Peyias FC (2010)
- Miroslav Matušovič – Apollon Limassol (2009–2010, 2011–2012)
- Michal Nehoda – Ethnikos Achna FC (2001–2002)
- Josef Obajdin – AC Omonia (2002)
- Zbyněk Ollender – EPA Larnaca (1993–1994)
- Michal Ordoš – Karmiotissa FC (2016–2017)
- David Pašek – Karmiotissa FC (2017)
- Jan Pejša – Ethnikos Achna FC (2004–2006)
- Stanislav Pelc – EPA Larnaca (1987–1988)
- Pavel Pergl – AEK Larnaca FC (2007–2008)
- Josef Pešice – AEL Limassol (1984–1986)
- Tomáš Pešír – Nea Salamina (2009)
- Miroslav Příložný – AEL Limassol (1988–1990)
- Zdeněk Procházka – Omonia Aradippou (1991–1992)
- Jan Rezek – Anorthosis Famagusta FC (2011–2013), Apollon Limassol (2014), Ermis Aradippou (2015)
- Oldřich Rott – EPA Larnaca (1983–1984)
- Stanislav Seman – Alki Larnaca FC (1984–1987)
- Stefan Simic – AC Omonia (2025–)
- Jiří Šourek – AEL Limassol (1988–1990)
- Ondřej Smetana – Enosis Neon Paralimni FC (2013)
- Vlastimil Svoboda – Aris Limassol FC (2004–2005)
- Vít Turtenwald – APEP FC (2005–2006)
- Zdeněk Valnoha – Olympiakos Nicosia (2004–2005)
- Petr Vlček – Ethnikos Achna FC (2005–2006)
- Miroslav Vodehnal – AEP Paphos FC (2004–2005), APOP Kinyras Peyias FC (2005–2006)
- Jan Vorel – Aris Limassol FC (2007–2008)
- Tomáš Votava – APOEL FC (2003–2004)
- Tomáš Wágner – Nea Salamina (2020–2021)
- Milan Zahálka – Ethnikos Achna FC (2010–2011)

== Denmark ==
- Patrick Banggaard – Pafos FC (2018–2019)
- Mikkel Beckmann – APOEL FC (2013)
- Peter Gravesen – APEP FC (2009–2010)
- Piotr Haren – Apollon Limassol (2000)
- Mike Jensen – APOEL FC (2020)
- Anders Nielsen – AC Omonia (2000–2001)
- Emil Peter Jørgensen – AC Omonia (2016–2017)
- Morten Rasmussen – Enosis Neon Paralimni FC (2018–2019)

== Egypt ==
- Amir Azmy – Anorthosis Famagusta FC (2008), AEK Larnaca FC (2009), Enosis Neon Paralimni FC (2015–2016)
- Karim Hafez – AC Omonia (2015–2016)
- Magdy Tolba – Anorthosis Famagusta FC (1994–1995)
- Amr Warda – Anorthosis Famagusta FC (2021–)

== El Salvador ==
- Eliseo Quintanilla – Ermis Aradippou (2009)

== England ==
- Hakeem Araba – AEK Kouklia FC (2013–2014)
- Chris Bart-Williams – APOEL FC (2004–2005)
- Morgan Brown – Aris Limassol FC (2021–)
- David Cross – AEL Limassol (1986–1987)
- Matt Derbyshire – AC Omonia (2016–2020), AEK Larnaca FC (2021–2022)
- Sean Devine – AC Omonia (1995–1996)
- Dave Esser – APOEL FC (1982–1983)
- Peter Farrell – APOEL FC (1988–1989)
- Michael Felgate – Enosis Neon Paralimni FC (2008–2009), Ayia Napa FC (2012–2013, 2014–2016)
- Joe Garner – APOEL FC (2021)
- Dean Gordon – APOEL FC (2004–2005)
- Julian Gray – Nea Salamina (2011–2013)
- Jordan Greenidge – AC Omonia (2018)
- Tom Hateley – AEK Larnaca FC (2020–2021)
- Rushian Hepburn-Murphy – Pafos FC (2020–2021)
- Craig Hignett – Apollon Limassol (2005–2006)
- Sam Hutchinson – Pafos FC (2020)
- Jozsef Keaveny – AEK Larnaca FC (2019–2020)
- Will Mannion – Pafos FC (2020–2021)
- George Marsh – AEL Limassol FC (2023–)
- Terry McDermott – APOEL FC (1985–1986)
- Ian Moores – APOEL FC (1983–1988)
- Michael Ngoo – Enosis Neon Paralimni FC (2021)
- Moses Odubajo – AC Omonia (2026–)
- George Oghani – Evagoras Paphos (1991–1992)
- Gary Owen – APOEL FC (1988–1989)
- James Panayi – Apollon Limassol (2002–2003)
- Jason Puncheon – Pafos FC (2019–2022), Anorthosis Famagusta FC (2022–2023)
- Omar Rowe – Enosis Neon Paralimni FC (2018)
- Jay Simpson – Nea Salamina (2019–2020)
- Alistair Slowe – Ayia Napa FC (2015–2016), Anagennisi Dherynia (2016–2017)
- Dave Swindlehurst – Anorthosis Famagusta FC (1985–1986)
- Paul Tait – Nea Salamina (2002–2005)
- Simranjit Thandi – AEK Larnaca FC (2019–)
- Michael Weir – Doxa Katokopias FC (2012–2013)

== Equatorial Guinea ==
- Kike Boula – Ermis Aradippou FC (2019)
- Randy – Aris Limassol FC (2015–2016)
- Rui – Enosis Neon Paralimni FC (2012–2013)
- Sipo – AEK Larnaca FC (2014–2015)

== Estonia ==
- Nikita Baranov – Karmiotissa FC (2020–2021)
- Artur Kotenko – AEP Paphos FC (2010–2011)
- Andres Oper – AEK Larnaca FC (2010–2011), Nea Salamina (2012–2013)
- Ats Purje – AEP Paphos FC (2010–2011), Ethnikos Achna FC (2011)
- Andrei Stepanov – Aris Limassol FC (2012)
- Martin Vunk – Nea Salamina (2011–2012)

== Finland ==
- Iiro Aalto – Olympiakos Nicosia (2008)
- Paulus Arajuuri – Pafos FC (2019–2021), Anorthosis Famagusta FC (2021–2022)
- Juha Hakola – Aris Limassol FC (2014)
- Adam Markhiyev – Aris Limassol FC (2025–)
- Thomas Lam – Apollon Limassol FC (2024–)
- Juhani Ojala – Doxa Katokopias FC (2022–23)
- Boris Rotenberg – Olympiakos Nicosia (2012–2013)
- Berat Sadik – Doxa Katokopias FC (2017–2019, 2020–2024), Anorthosis Famagusta FC (2019), Enosis Neon Paralimni FC (2020)
- Onni Valakari – Pafos FC (2020–)
- Jani Viander – Aris Limassol FC (2004–2005)
- Samu Volotinen – Apollon Limassol (2019–2020)

== France ==
- Léonard Aggoune – Pafos FC (2017–2018)
- Lamine Ba – Doxa Katokopias FC (2017–2019)
- Cédric Bardon – Anorthosis Famagusta FC (2008–2009)
- Éric Bauthéac – AC Omonia (2019–)
- Bryan Bergougnoux – AC Omonia (2012)
- Kévin Bérigaud – Pafos FC (2018, 2019–)
- Kelly Berville – APOP Kinyras Peyias FC (2010–2011)
- Vincent Bessat – Anorthosis Famagusta FC (2018–2019), Apollon Limassol (2019–2020)
- Dylan Bikey – Doxa Katokopias FC (2017–2018)
- Bruno Cheyrou – Anorthosis Famagusta FC (2010)
- Amick Ciani – Doxa Katokopias FC (2012)
- Alois Confais – Nea Salamina (2020–2021), Olympiakos Nicosia (2021–)
- Mathieu Coutadeur – AEL Limassol (2015–2016)
- Vincent Créhin – Nea Salamina (2020–2021)
- Dorian Dervite – Doxa Katokopias FC (2019–2020)
- Abdelaye Diakité – Alki Oroklini (2017–2018)
- Kandet Diawara – APOEL FC (2021–)
- Nicolas Diguiny – Apollon Limassol (2020–)
- Bagaliy Dabo – Apollon Limassol (2020–)
- Bruno Durant – Ermis Aradippou (2009–2010)
- Dylan Duventru – Alki Oroklini (2017–2018), Olympiakos Nicosia (2019–2020), Nea Salamina (2021)
- Christophe Ettori – AEK Larnaca FC (2004–2006)
- Imad Faraj – AEK Larnaca FC (2021–)
- Kenny Gillet – AEK Larnaca FC (2012–2013), Nea Salamina (2014)
- Mickaël Gaffoor – AC Omonia (2018–2019)
- Daniel Gomez – Doxa Katokopias FC (2010)
- Hérold Goulon – AC Omonia (2015), Doxa Katokopias FC (2017–2018), Pafos FC (2017–2018), Ermis Aradippou (2018)
- Elliot Grandin – Ermis Aradippou (2017)
- Sébastien Grimaldi – APOP Kinyras Peyias FC (2008–2010)
- Arnaud Honoré – Nea Salamina (2015)
- Vincent Laban – Digenis Morphou (2005–2007), Anorthosis Famagusta FC (2007–2013)
- Maxim Larroque – AEL Limassol (2009–2011)
- David Faupala – Apollon Limassol (2018–2019)
- Mamadou Kamissoko – Nea Salamina (2021)
- Florian Lucchini – AEP Paphos FC (2006–2007, 2009–2010)
- Jérémy Lux – AEP Paphos FC (2006–2007)
- Roger Tamba M'Pinda – Apollon Limassol (2019)
- Bernard Mendy – AEL Limassol (2015)
- Camel Meriem – Apollon Limassol (2013–2015)
- Kévin Monnet-Paquet – Aris Limassol FC (2021–)
- Donneil Moukanza – Aris Limassol FC (2016)
- Cédric Moukouri – Enosis Neon Paralimni FC (2011–2012)
- Hilaire Muñoz – APEP FC (2005–2006)
- Samuel Néva – Apollon Limassol (2009–2012)
- Fayçal Nini – Nea Salamina (2009–2010)
- Stéphane Noro – Apollon Limassol (2011–2012)
- Christian Nadé – Alki Larnaca FC (2010)
- Joshua Nadeau – AEL Limassol (2014–2015)
- Di Giovanni Nouma Oum – Ermis Aradippou (2020)
- Christophe Ott – APEP FC (2008)
- Mickaël Panos – Pafos FC (2019–2020), Enosis Neon Paralimni FC (2021)
- Bryan Pelé – AEL Limassol (2021–)
- Jean-Baptiste Pierazzi – Alki Oroklini (2017–2018)
- Christophe Psyché – AEL Limassol (2021)
- Valentin Roberge – Apollon Limassol (2016–)
- Bertrand Robert – Apollon Limassol (2013–2015), AEL Limassol (2015–2016)
- Jérémie Rodrigues – AEL Limassol (2008–2009), Nea Salamina (2009–2010)
- Amadou Sanokho – APEP FC (2008–2009)
- Magatte Sarr – Enosis Neon Paralimni FC (2018–2019)
- Anthony Scaramozzino – AC Omonia (2012–2015)
- Léo Schwechlen – Anorthosis Famagusta FC (2015–2016)
- Mohamadou Sissoko – Ermis Aradippou (2020)
- Boubakari Soumbounou – Karmiotissa FC (2020–2021)
- Kevin Tapoko – Aris Limassol FC (2018)
- Florian Taulemesse – AEK Larnaca FC (2017–2021), Ethnikos Achna FC (2021–)
- Nicolas Taravel – Pafos FC (2017–2018)
- Chafik Tigroudja – Alki Oroklini (2017–2018)
- Yoann Tribeau – Alki Oroklini (2017, 2019), Olympiakos Nicosia (2018)
- Mathieu Valverde – Anorthosis Famagusta FC (2012–2015), Ethnikos Achna FC (2015)
- Mamadou Wague – Ethnikos Achna FC (2014–2015)
- Curtis Yebli – Ermis Aradippou (2020)

== Gabon ==
- Shavy Babicka – Aris Limassol FC (2021–)
- Frédéric Bulot – Doxa Katokopias FC (2021)
- Dieudonné Londo – Digenis Morphou (2006–2007)
- Alex Moucketou-Moussounda – Aris Limassol FC (2021–)
- Ulysse Ndong – Othellos Athienou F.C. (2014–2015), Ermis Aradippou (2015–2016)

== Gambia ==
- Mustapha Carayol – Apollon Limassol (2018–2019)
- Jatto Ceesay – AEK Larnaca FC (2006–2007), AEP Paphos FC (2008)
- Mustapha Kamal N'Daw – AEK Larnaca FC (2006–2007), Doxa Katokopias FC (2007), Enosis Neon Paralimni FC (2009)
- Seyfo Soley – Doxa Katokopias FC (2011)

== Georgia ==
- Giorgi Aburjania – Anorthosis Famagusta FC (2014–2015)
- Bakhva Ambidze – AEL Limassol (2002)
- Jano Ananidze – Anorthosis Famagusta FC (2020)
- Guram Aspindzelashvili – Ermis Aradippou (2001–2002)
- Revaz Barabadze – Ethnikos Achna FC (2016)
- David Chaladze – Anorthosis Famagusta FC (2004–2005)
- Soso Chedia – Olympiakos Nicosia (1992–1996)
- Murtaz Daushvili – Anorthosis Famagusta FC (2019–2021), APOEL FC (2021–)
- Avtandil Ebralidze – Doxa Katokopias FC (2021–)
- Giorgi Gabidauri – Anorthosis Famagusta FC (2003–2006)
- Nikoloz Gelashvili – Pafos FC (2015)
- Irakliy Geperidze – AEP Paphos FC (2009–2010)
- Paata Gincharadze – APEP FC (1996–1997), Ethnikos Assia (1997–1998)
- Gocha Gogrichiani – AC Omonia (1993–1995), Nea Salamina (1995–1996)
- Gia Grigalava – Pafos FC (2015), Ethnikos Achna FC (2016)
- Shota Grigalashvili – Anorthosis Famagusta FC (2013–2014), AC Omonia (2014), Nea Salamina (2015), Ethnikos Achna FC (2015–2016)
- Elguja Grigalashvili – Othellos Athienou F.C. (2014–2015), Pafos FC (2015), Ethnikos Achna FC (2016)
- Revaz Injgia – Apollon Limassol (2021–2022, 2022–2023) Olympiakos Nicosia (2025–)
- Giorgi Iluridze – Ethnikos Achna FC (2016–2018)
- Gocha Jamarauli – Anorthosis Famagusta FC (2005)
- Kakha Kacharava – Olympiakos Nicosia (1992–1994)
- Nika Kacharava – Ethnikos Achna FC (2016–2017), Anorthosis Famagusta FC (2018–2020, 2021–)
- Levan Kebadze – Enosis Neon Paralimni FC (2001–2002), Ethnikos Achna FC (2005–2011)
- Roin Kerdzevadze – Omonia Aradippou (1994–1995)
- Temuri Ketsbaia – Anorthosis Famagusta FC (1992–1994, 2002–2007)
- Gocha Khojava – Anorthosis Famagusta FC (2004–2005)
- Levan Khmaladze – Othellos Athienou F.C. (2014–2015), Pafos FC (2015–2016)
- Georgi Kinkladze – Anorthosis Famagusta FC (2004–2005, 2006)
- Davit Kizilashvili – AC Omonia (1993–1995)
- Georgi Koridze – Ermis Aradippou (2001), Onisilos Sotira (2003–2004), Olympiakos Nicosia (2004–2005)
- Dimitri Kudinov – APOEL FC (1993–1994), Aris Limassol FC (1994–1995), Olympiakos Nicosia (1995–1996)
- Roin Kvaskhvadze – Othellos Athienou F.C. (2014–2015), Pafos FC (2015)
- Giorgi Kvilitaia – Anorthosis Famagusta FC (2020–2021), APOEL FC (2021–)
- David Kvirkvelia – Anorthosis Famagusta FC (2012)
- Ucha Lobjanidze – AC Omonia (2014–2015)
- Georgi Loria – Anorthosis Famagusta FC (2019–)
- Levan Maghradze – Aris Limassol FC (2000–2001), AEP Paphos FC (2001–2002), AEL Limassol (2002–2004), Apollon Limassol (2007–2009), Ermis Aradippou (2009–2011, 2013–2014), Ethnikos Achna FC (2011–2012)
- Irakli Maisuradze – Anorthosis Famagusta FC (2014–2016), Ermis Aradippou (2016–2017), Enosis Neon Paralimni FC (2018–2021)
- Beka Mikeltadze – Anorthosis Famagusta FC (2018–2019)
- Amiran Mujiri – Anorthosis Famagusta FC (2005–2006)
- Goderdzi Natroshvili – APEP FC (1996–1997), Anagennisi Dherynia (1997–1998)
- Nika Ninua – Anorthosis Famagusta FC (2021)
- Tornike Okriashvili – Anorthosis Famagusta FC (2019–2021), APOEL FC (2021–)
- Giorgi Papava – Nea Salamina (2015)
- Giorgi Papunashvili – Apollon Limassol (2021–)
- Davit Petriashvili – Onisilos Sotira (2003–2004)
- Levan Qipiani – Olympiakos Nicosia (1992–1993)
- Giorgi Shengelia – Apollon Limassol (2001–2002), Digenis Morphou (2002–2003)
- Mamuka Tsereteli – Nea Salamina (2002–2003)
- Klimenti Tsitaishvili – Anorthosis Famagusta FC (2003–2006), AEL Limassol (2006), AEK Larnaca FC (2007), Anorthosis Famagusta FC (2008–2009), Nea Salamina (2009–2010)
- Beka Tugushi – Ethnikos Achna FC (2015)
- Davit Ujmajuridze – Enosis Neon Paralimni FC (1997), Anagennisi Dherynia (1998)

== Germany ==
- Jonas Acquistapace – AC Omonia (2014)
- Heiner Backhaus – AEK Larnaca FC (2003–2004)
- Uwe Bialon – Pezoporikos Larnaca (1987–1994), AEL Limassol (1994–1995)
- Stefan Brasas – AC Omonia (2002–2003)
- Marc Eberle – Aris Limassol FC (2009–2010)
- Elvis Eckardt – APOP Kinyras Peyias FC (2008)
- Thomas Epp – AEL Limassol (2000–2001)
- Marco Förster – AEP Paphos FC (2008–2009)
- Holger Greilich – AC Omonia (2002–2003)
- Marco Haber – AC Omonia (2002–2004), Anorthosis Famagusta (2004–2006), Nea Salamina (2006–2007)
- Antoine Hey – Anorthosis Famagusta FC (2001–2003)
- Guido Hoffmann – AC Omonia (1997–1998)
- Ronny Kockel – Olympiakos Nicosia (2005–2006)
- Mustafa Kučuković – Olympiakos Nicosia (2012)
- Martin Lanig – APOEL FC (2015)
- Ioannis Masmanidis – Apollon Limassol (2009–2010)
- Michael Kümmerle – Atromitos Yeroskipou (2008–2009)
- Andy Nägelein – APEP FC (2009–2010)
- Jens Paeslack – AEL Limassol (2001–2002)
- Nico Pellatz – Apollon Limassol (2009–2010)
- Marcel Rath – Digenis Morphou (2006–2007)
- Rainer Rauffmann – AC Omonia (1997–2004)
- Paulo Rink – Olympiakos Nicosia (2003, 2004–2006), AC Omonia (2006)
- Thomas Scheuring – AC Omonia (2008)
- Lars Schlichting – Ethnikos Achna FC (2005–2012)
- Niels Schlotterbeck – APOEL FC (1997–1998)
- Nils Teixeira – AEL Limassol (2018–)
- Timo Wenzel – AC Omonia (2008–2011)
- Fabian Wilhelmsen – APEP FC (2009–2010)

== Ghana ==
- Godwin Ablorday – Olympiakos Nicosia (2005–2007)
- Livingstone Adjin – Doxa Katokopias FC (2014)
- Junior Agogo – Apollon Limassol (2009–2010)
- Ernest Agyiri – Enosis Neon Paralimni FC (2019–2020)
- Albert Ahulu – Doxa Katokopias FC (2014–2015)
- Koffi Amponsah – Enosis Neon Paralimni FC (2008–2009)
- Ebo Andoh – AEL Limassol (2012–2014)
- Ernest Asante – AC Omonia (2020–)
- John Arwuah – AEL Limassol (2015)
- Benjamín Asamoah – Doxa Katokopias FC (2017–)
- Sadat Bukari – Aris Limassol FC (2016)
- Chris Dickson – Nea Salamina (2011), AEL Limassol (2012), Enosis Neon Paralimni FC (2015), Ermis Aradippou (2016)
- Daniel Edusei – Ethnikos Achna FC (2008–2009)
- Emmanuel Frimpong – Ermis Aradippou (2017)
- Ebenezer Hagan – APOEL FC (2005)
- Felix Kenu – Anagennisi Dherynia (2011–2012)
- Richard Kingson – Doxa Katokopias FC (2013)
- Imoro Lukman – AEP Paphos FC (2008–2010), APOP Kinyras Peyias FC (2010–2011), Nea Salamina (2011)
- Kofi Mensah – Anorthosis Famagusta FC (2004–2005)
- Francis Narh – Doxa Katokopias FC (2018)
- Razak Nuhu – Apollon Limassol (2014), Anorthosis Famagusta FC (2014–2016)
- Carlos Ohene – Alki Larnaca FC (2011–2012), AEL Limassol (2013–2016)
- Peter Ofori-Quaye – AEL Limassol (2008)
- Samad Oppong – Ethnikos Achna FC (2013)
- Barnes Osei – Nea Salamina (2020–2021)
- Kweku Seth Osei – Ayia Napa FC (2013)
- Emmanuel Pappoe – AEK Larnaca FC (2007–2009)
- Mustapha Quaynor – Alki Larnaca FC (2013–2014), Ermis Aradippou (2014–2016)
- Yusif Rahman – Alki Larnaca FC (2011–2014)
- Yaw Rush – ENTHOI Lakatamia FC (2005–2006), APEP FC (2007–2008)
- Moses Sakyi – AEL Limassol (2008)
- Kingsley Sarfo – Olympiakos Nicosia (2020–)
- Alhassan Wakaso – Olympiakos Nicosia (2021–)
- Shaibu Yakubu – Enosis Neon Paralimni FC (2011–2013)
- Samuel Yeboah – Nea Salamina (2012)

== Greece ==
- Michalis Agrimakis – Olympiakos Nicosia (2020–2021)
- Christos Albanis – Apollon Limassol (2021–)
- Alexandros Alexandris – APOP Kinyras Peyias FC (2006)
- Georgios Amanatidis – APOEL FC (2003–2004)
- Georgios Ambaris – Enosis Neon Paralimni FC (2015–2016)
- Nikolaos Anastasopoulos – AEK Larnaca FC (2006–2007)
- Giannis Angelopoulos – Pafos FC (2018–2019)
- Kostas Apostolakis – APOEL FC (2020–2021)
- Giannis Arabatzis – Ermis Aradippou (2013–2014, 2017–2019)
- Nikos Arabatzis – Ethnikos Achna FC (2012)
- Andreas Archontakis – Aris Limassol FC (2006–2007)
- Kyriakos Aretas – Doxa Katokopias FC (2016–2017)
- Dimitris Argiropoulos – Ayia Napa FC (2006–2007)
- Anestis Argyriou – Ethnikos Achna FC (2015)
- Grigorios Athanasiou – Ayia Napa FC (2014–2015)
- Giannis Bachanelidis – Ayia Napa FC (2006–2007)
- Konstantinos Banousis – Ermis Aradippou (2018–2019)
- Georgios Bantis – AC Omonia (2016)
- Nikos Barboudis – Ayia Napa FC (2012–2013), Ethnikos Achna FC (2013–2014), Anagennisi Dherynia (2016)
- Kenan Bargan – Karmiotissa FC (2020–2021)
- Thodoris Berios – Nea Salamina (2020–2021)
- Vassilis Bletsas – Digenis Morphou (2004–2005)
- Vasilios Borbokis – Anorthosis Famagusta FC (2006)
- Kostas Chaniotakis – APOEL FC (2005–2006)
- Charalabos Charalabakis – AEP Paphos FC (2006–2007)
- Dimos Chantzaras – AC Omonia (2016–2017)
- Christos Chatzipantelidis – Olympiakos Nicosia (2005–2006), Nea Salamina (2011)
- Anastasios Chatzigiovanis – AC Omonia (2025–)
- Nikos Chatzis – APOP Kinyras Peyias FC (2007–2008), Atromitos Yeroskipou (2008), AEP Paphos FC (2009)
- Dionisis Chiotis – APOEL FC (2008–2015)
- Ilias Chouzouris – AEP Paphos FC (2003–2004)
- Lazaros Christodoulopoulos – Anorthosis Famagusta FC (2021–)
- Traianos Dellas – Anorthosis Famagusta FC (2008–2010)
- Manolis Dermitzakis – AEK Larnaca FC (2005–2006)
- Dimitris Diamantis – AEL Limassol (2006–2007)
- Angelos Digozis – Olympiakos Nicosia (2002)
- Petros Dimitriadis – Digenis Morphou (2005)
- Alkis Dimitris – AEP Paphos FC (2006–2007)
- Savvas Exouzidis – Aris Limassol FC (2002–2003)
- Giannis Firinidis – Ermis Aradippou (2018–2019, 2020–2021)
- Kostas Frantzeskos – AEK Larnaca FC (2002–2003)
- Nikolaos Frousos – Anorthosis Famagusta FC (2004–2010)
- Sokratis Fytanidis – Enosis Neon Paralimni FC (2019)
- Theodoros Galanis – APOP Kinyras Peyias FC (2007–2010)
- Aris Galanopoulos – Enosis Neon Paralimni FC (2012–2013)
- Georgios Galitsios – Anorthosis Famagusta FC (2019–2021)
- Iraklis Garoufalias – Olympiakos Nicosia (2020–2021)
- Savvas Gentsoglou – APOEL FC (2018–2020)
- Giorgos Georgiadis – AEL Limassol (2016–2017)
- Angelos Georgiou – APOP Kinyras Peyias FC (2005), AEK Larnaca FC (2005)
- Nikos Giannakopoulos – Aris Limassol FC (2016–2017)
- Makis Giannikoglou – AC Omonia (2011–2013)
- Giannis Gianniotas – APOEL FC (2016–2017), Apollon Limassol (2019–2021)
- Panagiotis Giannopoulos – Ethnikos Achna FC (2014)
- Dimitris Giannoulis – Anorthosis Famagusta FC (2017)
- Kostas Giannoulis – Pafos FC (2018)
- Kleopas Giannou – AEL Limassol (2007)
- Spyros Gogolos – Ermis Aradippou (2010), Anagennisi Dherynia (2011–2012)
- Giannis Goumas – Ermis Aradippou (2012)
- Dimitrios Grammozis – AC Omonia (2009–2010)
- Dimitris Ignatiadis – Doxa Katokopias FC (2007–2008)
- Christos Intzidis – Apollon Limassol (2014)
- Dimitris Ioannou – AEP Paphos FC (2012–2013)
- Nikos Iordanidis – AEP Paphos FC (2004–2005)
- Kostas Ipirotis – APOP Kinyras Peyias FC (2005–2006)
- Kostas Kafalis – Ethnikos Achna FC (2004, 2005–2006)
- Alexandros Kaklamanos – APOEL FC (2005–2006), Enosis Neon Paralimni FC (2008–2009)
- Alexandros Kalogeris – Nea Salamina (2014)
- Nikos Kaltsas – Anorthosis Famagusta FC (2019–)
- Anastasios Kantoutsis – AC Omonia (2015–2016)
- Michalis Kapsis – APOEL FC (2006–2008)
- Christos Karadais – Olympiakos Nicosia (2020–2021)
- Vasilios Karagounis – AEL Limassol (2015), Ermis Aradippou (2020–2021)
- Christos Karipidis – AC Omonia (2009–2012), APOEL FC (2012–2013), Apollon Limassol (2013–2014)
- Nikos Katsavakis – Digenis Morphou (2002–2004), Anorthosis Famagusta FC (2006–2010), Apollon Limassol (2010)
- Kostas Kiassos – Anorthosis Famagusta FC (2006), Enosis Neon Paralimni FC (2011)
- Dimitrios Kiliaras – AEP Paphos FC (2012)
- Fotis Kitsos – AC Omonia (2022–2023, 2024–)
- Nikos Koliokostas – Digenis Morphou (2006–2007)
- Nikos Kolombourdas – Onisilos Sotira (2003–2004)
- Dimitris Kolovos – AC Omonia (2019)
- Kostas Konstantinidis – Nea Salamina (2007)
- Dimitris Konstantinidis – AC Omonia (2016–2017), Olympiakos Nicosia (2021)
- Georgios Kostis – Olympiakos Nicosia (2004–2005), AEP Paphos FC (2006–2007), Doxa Katokopias FC (2008–2009)
- Konstantinos Kotsaris – AC Omonia (2016–2017)
- Stefanos Kotsolis – AC Omonia (2009–2010)
- Efthimis Koulouris – Anorthosis Famagusta FC (2015–2016)
- Nikos Kounenakis – Aris Limassol FC (2009–2010)
- Alexandros Kouros – PAEEK FC (2021–)
- Georgios Kousas – Aris Limassol FC (2018)
- Vangelis Koutsopoulos – APOEL FC (2010), AEL Limassol (2011)
- Nikolaos Kouvarakis – Alki Larnaca FC (2007–2008)
- Panagiotis Kynigopoulos – Enosis Neon Paralimni FC (2020–2021)
- Dimitris Kyriakidis – Karmiotissa FC (2020–2021)
- Pavlos Kyriakidis – Ermis Aradippou (2020–2021)
- Anastasios Kyriakos – AC Omonia (2009–2010)
- Christos Kontis – APOEL FC (2006–2011)
- Anastasios Lagos – Ermis Aradippou (2019)
- Christos Lambakis – AEL Limassol (2006–2007)
- Giorgos Lambropoulos – AEK Larnaca FC (2010–2011), Nea Salamina (2011–2013, 2014–2015), Ayia Napa FC (2015–2016)
- Spiros Livathinos – Pezoporikos Larnaca (1987–1988)
- Nikos Lougos – Nea Salamina (2017)
- Konstantinos Loumpoutis – Anorthosis Famagusta FC (2007)
- Nikos Machlas – APOEL FC (2006–2008)
- Giorgos Machlelis – Ethnikos Achna FC (2011)
- Aristidis Magafinis – Olympiakos Nicosia (2003)
- Grigoris Makos – Anorthosis Famagusta FC (2013–2015)
- Giorgos Makris – Anorthosis Famagusta FC (2012)
- Michalis Manias – Anorthosis Famagusta FC (2020–2021)
- Dimosthenis Manousakis – Ethnikos Achna FC (2008–2009)
- Giorgos Manthatis – Anorthosis Famagusta FC (2019–2020)
- Evangelos Mantzios – Anorthosis Famagusta FC (2010)
- Vasilios Mantzis – Olympiakos Nicosia (2020–)
- Markos Maragoudakis – Aris Limassol FC (2015–2018)
- Spiros Marangos – AC Omonia (1998–1999), APOEL FC (2000–2002)
- Stelios Marangos – AEK Larnaca FC (2013)
- Demetris Maris – Aris Limassol FC (2004), Digenis Morphou (2004–2006), AEK Larnaca FC (2006–2008), AC Omonia (2008–2009), Alki Larnaca FC (2010), Doxa Katokopias FC (2011)
- Antonis Markopoulos – AEP Paphos FC (2006–2007)
- Giannis Masouras – AC Omonia (2024–)
- Charalampos Mavrias – AC Omonia (2019–2021), Apollon Limassol (2021–)
- Dimitris Meidanis – Olympiakos Nicosia (2004–2006), Aris Limassol FC (2006–2007)
- Pashalis Melissas – AEP Paphos FC (2012)
- Nikolaos Michopoulos – AC Omonia (2003–2004)
- Ilias Mihalopoulos – AEK Larnaca FC (2013)
- Vassilis Mitilinaios – ENTHOI Lakatamia FC (2005–2006), Enosis Neon Paralimni FC (2006–2008)
- Nikolaos Mitrou – Digenis Morphou (2006)
- Dimitris Morales – Doxa Katokopias FC (2007–2008)
- Thanasis Moulopoulos – Aris Limassol FC (2017–2018)
- Dimitris Nalitzis – AEP Paphos FC (2006)
- Giorgos Nasiopoulos – Digenis Morphou (2004–2005), APOEL FC (2005–2006)
- Alexandros Natsiopoulos – Anagennisi Dherynia (2016–2017)
- Vangelis Oikonomou – Karmiotissa FC (2020)
- Marinos Ouzounidis – APOEL FC (2001–2003)
- Leonidas Panagopoulos – Ermis Aradippou (2015–2016)
- Konstantinos Pangalos – AEZ Zakakiou (2016), Aris Limassol FC (2017–2018)
- Athanasios Panteliadis – AC Omonia (2016)
- Efthimios Pantelidis – Doxa Katokopias FC (2007–2009)
- Nikos Pantidos – Aris Limassol FC (2016–2017)
- Vasilis Papadopoulos – Enosis Neon Paralimni FC (2015–2016), Karmiotissa FC (2016)
- Yiannis Papadopoulos – Nea Salamina (2017–2018)
- Giorgos Papandreou – Digenis Morphou (2002–2003), APOEL FC (2003–2004), Olympiakos Nicosia (2004)
- Anastasios Papazoglou – APOEL FC (2014)
- Fotios Papoulis – Apollon Limassol (2012–2020), AC Omonia (2020–)
- Panagiotis Pappas – AEL Limassol (2006)
- Anastasios Pastos – Doxa Katokopias FC (2000–2001)
- Christos Patsatzoglou – AC Omonia (2009–2010)
- Georgios Peglis – AEP Paphos FC (2000–2001), Enosis Neon Paralimni FC (2001–2004), Olympiakos Nicosia (2004–2006), Aris Limassol FC (2006–2007)
- Dimitris Petkakis – AEP Paphos FC (2012)
- Sokratis Petrou – AEP Paphos FC (2006–2007)
- Thanasis Pindonis – Anagennisi Dherynia (2011–2012)
- Christos Pipinis – APOEL FC (2014)
- Manthos Platakis – Digenis Morphou (2006–2007)
- Agathoklis Polyzos – Karmiotissa FC (2020)
- Savvas Poursaitidis – Digenis Morphou (2002–2004), Ethnikos Achna FC (2004–2005), Anorthosis Famagusta FC (2005–2008), APOEL FC (2008–2012)
- Stelios Pozoglou – Karmiotissa FC (2016–2017)
- Stergios Psianos – Nea Salamina (2013–2014), Ayia Napa FC (2014)
- Antonis Ranos – Aris Limassol FC (2016)
- Spyros Risvanis – Anorthosis Famagusta FC (2021–)
- Dimitris Rizos – Doxa Katokopias FC (2007–2008)
- Eleftherios Sakellariou – AEZ Zakakiou (2016)
- Vasilis Samaras – AEP Paphos FC (2002–2003)
- Dimitris Sandravelis – Ermis Aradippou (2017–2018)
- Manolis Saliakas – Karmiotissa FC (2016–2017)
- Anastasios Salonidis – APEP FC (2005–2006)
- Miltiadis Sapanis – APOEL FC (2007)
- Lazaros Semos – Doxa Katokopias FC (2003–2004)
- Giannis Sfakianakis – APOP Kinyras Peyias FC (2007–2009, 2010), Apollon Limassol (2009–2010)
- Stelios Sfakianakis – Olympiakos Nicosia (2004–2005)
- Giannis Siderakis – Doxa Katokopias FC (2014–2015)
- Georgios Simos – AEK Larnaca FC (2006)
- Stefanos Siontis – Doxa Katokopias FC (2012–2013, 2014)
- Giannis Skopelitis – Anorthosis Famagusta FC (2007, 2008–2011,2012–2013), AEK Larnaca FC (2011–2012, 2013–2015), Nea Salamina (2015–2017)
- Aristidis Soiledis – AC Omonia (2016–2017)
- Ioannis Sotiroglou – APOP Kinyras Peyias FC (2010–2011)
- Dimitris Souanis – Apollon Limassol (2012–2013)
- Stavros Stathakis – Enosis Neon Paralimni FC (2012–2013), Ayia Napa FC (2014)
- Evangelos Stournaras – Nea Salamina (2006)
- Kiriakos Stratilatis – Alki Oroklini (2017–2018), Ethnikos Achna FC (2019–2021)
- Charalambos Siligardakis – AEK Larnaca FC (2005–2006), Anorthosis Famagusta FC (2006–2007)
- Christos Talichmanidis – Olympiakos Nicosia (2025–)
- Giannis Taralidis – Nea Salamina (2013), Ermis Aradippou (2014–2015, 2017–), Karmiotissa FC (2016–2017)
- Giorgos Theodoridis – Apollon Limassol (2012–2013)
- Theodoros Tripotseris – Anorthosis Famagusta FC (2006–2008)
- Savvas Tsabouris – Nea Salamina (2016–2017, 2019–2020)
- Apostolos Tsilingiris – APOEL FC (2020–)
- Kostas Tsironis – Aris Limassol FC (2004–2005), Digenis Morphou (2005–2006)
- Giannis Tsolakidis – Karmiotissa FC (2016)
- Stavros Tsoukalas – Nea Salamina (2021)
- Manolis Tzanakakis – Anorthosis Famagusta FC (2015–2016)
- Alexandros Tziolis – APOEL FC (2012–2013)
- Stavros Tziortziopoulos – AC Omonia (2007)
- Georgios Vakouftsis – APOEL FC (2002–2005), AC Omonia (2005–2008)
- Giorgos Valerianos – Pafos FC (2019–2021)
- Vasilis Vallianos – Enosis Neon Paralimni FC (2015–2016, 2018–2020), Ermis Aradippou (2020)
- Stavros Vangelopoulos – Digenis Morphou (2006–2007)
- Theodoros Vasilakakis – Anorthosis Famagusta FC (2019–2020)
- Andreas Vasilogiannis – Apollon Limassol (2011), Ermis Aradippou (2015–2016)
- Christos Veletanis – Ayia Napa FC (2006–2007)
- Marcos Vellidis – Olympiakos Nicosia (2020)
- Nikolaos Vlasopoulos – Anagennisi Dherynia (2016–2017)
- Georgios Vourexakis – Aris Limassol FC (2010)
- Praxitelis Vouros – APOEL FC (2017–2020)
- Loukas Vyntra – AC Omonia (2016–2019)
- Georgios Xenidis – Anorthosis Famagusta FC (2004–2006)
- Anastasios Zafeirides – Atromitos Yeroskipou (2008–2009)
- Nikos Zapropoulos – Anorthosis Famagusta FC (2006)
- Nikos Ziabaris – Olympiakos Nicosia (2018)
- Angelos Zioulis – AEL Limassol (2015)
- Giorgos Zigogiannis – AEK Larnaca FC (2013)

== Guadeloupe ==
- Matthieu Bemba – Ermis Aradippou (2009–2011, 2013–2015), Ethnikos Achna FC (2012), Nea Salamina (2015–2016)
- Mickaël Antoine-Curier – Ethnikos Achna FC (2011)
- Michaël Niçoise – Ethnikos Achna FC (2009–2010)
- Kelly Irep – Enosis Neon Paralimni FC (2020–2021)

== Guatemala ==
- Gerardo Gordillo – Enosis Neon Paralimni FC (2013)

== Guinea ==
- Demba Camara – Anorthosis Famagusta FC (2017–2018)
- Fousseni Bamba – Ayia Napa FC (2014–2016)
- Kaba Diawara – Alki Larnaca FC (2008)
- Jean Fernandez – Doxa Katokopias FC (2018–2019)
- José Kanté – AEK Larnaca FC (2014–2015)
- Alhassane Keita – Ermis Aradippou (2015–2016)
- Sekou Keita – Ermis Aradippou (2018)
- Baissama Sankoh – Nea Salamina (2020–2021)
- Lancinet Sidibe – Ermis Aradippou (2020–2021)
- Ousmane Sidibé – Olympiakos Nicosia (2019)
- Richard Soumah – Apollon Limassol (2018–2019)

== Guinea-Bissau ==
- Aldair – AEL Limassol (2017–2018)
- Abel Camará – Pafos FC (2017–2018)
- Mamadu Candé – AC Omonia (2017–2018)
- Dionisio – AEK Larnaca FC (2008)
- Ednilson – AEK Larnaca FC (2008)
- Bruno Fernandes – Alki Larnaca FC (2011–2013)
- Esmaël Gonçalves – APOEL FC (2013), Anorthosis Famagusta FC (2015)
- Braíma Injai – Olympiakos Nicosia (2007–2008)
- Kaby – AEL Limassol (2012)
- Daniel Kenedy – APOEL FC (2005–2006)
- Malá – Doxa Katokopias FC (2009)
- João Mário - Olympiakos Nicosia (2024–)
- Mesca – AEL Limassol (2015–2018), Doxa Katokopias FC (2019–)
- Nani – Olympiakos Nicosia (2019–)
- Romário Baldé – Doxa Katokopias FC (2021–)
- Sambinha – Olympiakos Nicosia (2019–)
- Zezinho – AEL Limassol (2014)

== Haiti ==
- Gary Ambroise – Doxa Katokopias FC (2014)
- Kervens Belfort – Ethnikos Achna FC (2015)
- Frantz Bertin – Alki Larnaca FC (2011)
- Wilde-Donald Guerrier – Apollon Limassol (2021)
- Kevin Lafrance – AEL Limassol (2016–2019), Pafos FC (2019–2020), AEK Larnaca FC (2021), Doxa Katokopias FC (2021–)
- Jean-Eudes Maurice – Nea Salamina (2015)
- Soni Mustivar – Nea Salamina (2021)
- Emmanuel Sarki – AEL Limassol (2016)

== Honduras ==
- Allan Lalín – Nea Salamina (2013)

== Hungary ==
- Norbert Balogh – APOEL FC (2018–2019)
- Gábor Bardi – AEP Paphos FC (2003–2004), APOP Kinyras Peyias FC (2006–2010)
- Balázs Berdó – Digenis Morphou (2006–2007)
- Levente Bozsik – Anagennisi Dherynia (2003–2004)
- Zoltán Bükszegi – Nea Salamina (2005–2006)
- József Dzurják – AC Omonia (1991–1993)
- Norbert Farkas – Digenis Morphou (2006–2007)
- Róbert Fekete – AEP Paphos FC (2004–2005)
- Károly Graszl – Nea Salamina (2012–2013)
- Ádám Gyurcsó – AEK Larnaca FC (2021–)
- Tamás Juhár – Nea Salamina (2005–2007)
- Szabolcs Kemenes – Ethnikos Achna FC (2007–2008)
- Zoltán Kenesei – AEK Larnaca FC (2002–2003)
- József Kiprich – APOEL FC (1995–1997)
- Gábor Korolovszky – AC Omonia (2003–2005), Apollon Limassol (2005–2008), Aris Limassol FC (2009–2010)
- Béla Kovács – Alki Larnaca FC (2004–2005)
- Dániel Kovács – APEP FC (2009–2010)
- Kálmán Kovács – APOEL FC (1995–1996)
- Zoltán Kovács – Aris Limassol FC (2011–2012, 2013–2014), Nea Salamina (2012)
- István Kozma – APOEL FC (1995–1997)
- Ádám Lang – AC Omonia (2019–)
- Leandro – AC Omonia (2010–2015)
- Miklós Lendvai – Aris Limassol FC (2004–2005)
- Tibor Márkus – Apollon Limassol (2006), Digenis Morphou (2006–2007)
- Géza Mészöly – AEL Limassol (1997–1998)
- Gábor Nagy – APEP FC (2008–2010)
- Zoltán Nagy – Alki Larnaca (2004–2005), Anorthosis Famagusta FC (2005–2006, 2007–2010), Digenis Morphou (2006–2007), Doxa Katokopias FC (2010–2011)
- Zsolt Nagy – Atromitos Yeroskipou (2008)
- Krisztián Pest – APOP Kinyras Peyias FC (2005–2006)
- Zsolt Posza – Doxa Katokopias FC (2010)
- Zoltan Sabo – AEK Larnaca FC (2003–2004)
- Roland Sallai – APOEL FC (2017–2018)
- Balázs Schrancz – APOP Kinyras Peyias FC (2005–2006)
- József Sebök – AEL Limassol (2000–2004, 2005)
- Ákos Seper – APEP FC (2005–2006), Aris Limassol FC (2006–2008)
- Norbert Sipos – Nea Salamina (2009)
- Thomas Sowunmi – APOP Kinyras Peyias FC (2011)
- Attila Szalai – Apollon Limassol (2019–2021)
- Tamás Szamosi – Nea Salamina (2004–2008)
- Attila Szili – APEP FC (2008–2009)
- Barnabás Sztipánovics – APOEL FC (2002–2003), Olympiakos Nicosia (2003–2004)
- Lajos Terjék – Enosis Neon Paralimni FC (2004–2006)
- Attila Tököli – Anorthosis Famagusta FC (2005), AEL Limassol (2006)
- Gábor Torma – AEL Limassol (2004)
- Dániel Totka – APEP FC (2009–2010)
- Gábor Vayer – Digenis Morphou (2005–2006)
- Ádám Vezér – Anagennisi Dherynia (2003–2004), AC Omonia (2004–2007), Alki Larnaca FC (2007–2008)
- Gábor Vincze – Ethnikos Achna FC (2006–2007)
- Paulo Vinícius – APOEL FC (2021–)
- Aladár Virágh – Atromitos Yeroskipou (2008), Anagennisi Dherynia (2011)
- Géza Vlaszák – AEL Limassol (2006–2007)
- Róbert Waltner – Anorthosis Famagusta FC (2003)
- Gábor Zavadszky – Apollon Limassol (2004–2006)
- Zalán Zombori – Alki Larnaca FC (2004–2005)
- János Zováth – AEP Paphos FC (2004–2005)

== Iceland ==
- Kári Árnason – AC Omonia (2017)
- Haraldur Freyr Guðmundsson – Apollon Limassol (2009)
- Björn Bergmann Sigurðarson – APOEL FC (2020)

== Iran ==
- Ferydoon Zandi – Apollon Limassol (2006–2007), Olympiakos Nicosia (2008), Alki Larnaca FC (2008–2009)
- Ali Parhizi – APEP FC (2009–2010)
- Reza Ghoochannejhad – APOEL FC (2018)

== Iraq ==
- Youssef Amyn – AEK Larnaca (2025–)
- Mahdi Karim – Apollon Limassol (2006–2007)
- Hawar Mulla Mohammed – Apollon Limassol (2006–2007), Anorthosis Famagusta FC (2008–2009)
- Mohammed Nasser – Apollon Limassol (2006–2007)
- Haidar Obeid – Apollon Limassol (2006–2007)
- Jassim Swadi Arig – Apollon Limassol (2005–2007)

== Ireland ==
- Jack Byrne – APOEL FC (2021)
- Matthew Cassidy – Enosis Neon Paralimni FC (2008–2010), AEL Limassol (2010)
- Robbie Gibbons – Alki Larnaca FC (2011), Ermis Aradippou (2011)
- Cillian Sheridan – APOEL FC (2013–2015), AC Omonia (2015–2017)
- Abraham Abiola Joel – APEP FC (2026 )

== Israel ==
- Hasan Abu Zaid – AEK Larnaca FC (2014)
- Amir Agayev – AC Omonia (2016)
- Lior Asulin – Apollon Limassol (2008)
- Omer Atzili – APOEL FC (2020)
- Yaniv Azran – Enosis Neon Paralimni FC (2006)
- Roy Bakal – Alki Larnaca FC (2012–2013)
- Dudu Biton – APOEL FC (2013)
- David Ben Dayan – AC Omonia (2012)
- Amit Ben Shushan – Anorthosis Famagusta FC (2013–2014)
- Roberto Colautti – Anorthosis Famagusta FC (2013–2014), AEK Larnaca FC (2014–2015)
- Baruch Dego – Nea Salamina (2010), Apollon Limassol (2010–2011)
- Hen Ezra – AC Omonia (2019)
- Shoval Gozlan – Enosis Neon Paralimni FC (2019)
- Ariel Harush – Anorthosis Famagusta FC (2017–2018)
- Guy Haimov – AEK Larnaca FC (2012–2013)
- Eden Hershkovitz – Karmiotissa FC (2021)
- Nisso Kapiloto – Alki Larnaca FC (2012–2013)
- Boris Klaiman – Enosis Neon Paralimni FC (2018–2020)
- Ohad Levita – AC Omonia (2012–2013)
- Nir Mansour – Ayia Napa FC (2014)
- Haim Megrelashvili – Alki Larnaca FC (2010–2011), AEK Larnaca FC (2013–2014)
- Erez Mesika – AEK Larnaca FC (2008–2009)
- Dor Micha – Anorthosis Famagusta FC (2020–2021)
- Moshe Mishaelof – Apollon Limassol (2009), AEP Paphos FC (2010)
- Moshe Ohayon – Anorthosis Famagusta FC (2012–2014)
- Yarin Peretz – Karmiotissa FC (2020–2021)
- Uri Peso – Ayia Napa FC (2012–2013)
- Idan Sade – Enosis Neon Paralimni FC (2012)
- Ben Sahar – APOEL FC (2020–2021)
- Yuval Spungin – AC Omonia (2010–2013)
- Ram Strauss – Nea Salamina (2014–2015)
- Avi Tikva – Enosis Neon Paralimni FC (2004–2005)
- Yehiel Tzagai – APOP Kinyras Peyias FC (2010)
- Zion Tzemah – Enosis Neon Paralimni FC (2014)
- Assaf Tzur – Anorthosis Famagusta FC (2020–)
- Barak Yitzhaki – Anorthosis Famagusta FC (2012–2013)

== Italy ==
- Mattia Cinquini – Enosis Neon Paralimni FC (2014), Nea Salamina (2014–2016)
- Bruno Cirillo – Alki Larnaca FC (2012)
- Michele Di Piedi – APOEL FC (2004–2005)
- Fernando Forestieri - AEL Limassol (2025–)
- Marco Fortin – AEK Larnaca FC (2010–2012)
- Luigi Gennamo – APEP FC (2009–2010)
- Davide Grassi – Aris Limassol FC (2013–2014), Nea Salamina (2016–2017)
- Gaetano Monachello – Olympiakos Nicosia (2013)
- Marco Motta – AC Omonia (2018–2019)
- Pasquale Sbarra – APEP FC (2009–2010)
- Simone Scuffet – APOEL FC (2021–)

== Ivory Coast ==
- Jean Luc Assoubre – AEK Larnaca FC (2018–2019), Ethnikos Achna FC (2021–)
- Christo Amessan – Ethnikos Achna FC (2013–2014)
- Adama Bamba – Doxa Katokopias FC (2012–2013)
- Siaka Bamba – Nea Salamina (2014)
- Lionel Bah – APOP Kinyras Peyias FC (2008–2009)
- Sekou Cissé – Anorthosis Famagusta FC (2017–2018)
- Joël Damahou – Pafos FC (2015–2016), Nea Salamina (2017–2018)
- Franck-Augustin Dia – APEP FC (2005–2006)
- Gilles Domoraud – Nea Salamina (2007–2008)
- Gaoussou Fofana – Doxa Katokopias FC (2012–2013, 2015–2017), Anorthosis Famagusta FC (2013–2014), AC Omonia (2014–2015), Ermis Aradippou (2017)
- Félicien Gbedinyessi – AEZ Zakakiou (2016–2017)
- Abraham Gneki Guié – Apollon Limassol (2013–2017)
- Aboubakar Karamoko – Doxa Katokopias FC (2020–2021)
- Erwin Koffi – Anorthosis Famagusta FC (2018–2020), Olympiakos Nicosia (2020)
- Brahima Bruno Koné – Ermis Aradippou (2020–2021)
- Aimé Koudou – AEL Limassol (2005–2006)
- Franck Madou – APOP Kinyras Peyias FC (2010)
- Lamine N'dao – Doxa Katokopias FC (2012–2013), Olympiakos Nicosia (2013)
- Serge Alain Liri – APOP Kinyras Peyias FC (2008–2011)
- Romaric – AC Omonia (2015–2016)
- Aly Savane – AEL Limassol (2016–2017)
- Ibrahim Sissoko – Doxa Katokopias FC (2017–2018)
- Vouho – AEL Limassol (2011–2013)
- Landry Zahana-Oni – AEL Limassol (2004–2007)
- Goba Zakpa – Ethnikos Achna FC (2020–)

== Japan ==
- Cy Goddard – Pafos FC (2019–2020)

== Jordan ==
- Odai Al-Saify – Alki Larnaca FC (2010–2011)
- Musa Al-Taamari – APOEL FC (2018–2020)
- Omar Hani – APOEL FC (2019–2020), Olympiakos Nicosia (2020–2021)

== Kazakhstan ==
- Oleg Litvinenko – Ermis Aradippou (2001–2002)
- Magomed Paragulgov – Ermis Aradippou (2020)
- Viktor Zubarev – Apollon Limassol (2000–2002)

== Korea Republic ==
- Jong-In Park – Nea Salamina (2017)

== Kosovo ==
- Donis Avdijaj – AEL Limassol (2021)
- Genc Iseni – Ethnikos Achna FC (2008)
- Krasniqi Kreshnic – Ethnikos Achna FC (2014, 2015–2016)
- Sokol Maliqi – APEP FC (2009–2010)
- Atdhe Nuhiu – APOEL FC (2020–2021)

== Latvia ==
- Vitālijs Artjomenko – AEP Paphos FC (2010–2011)
- Antonijs Černomordijs – Pafos FC (2017)
- Vladislavs Gabovs – Pafos FC (2017–2018)
- Artūrs Karašausks – Ethnikos Achna FC (2021–)
- Oļegs Karavajevs – Evagoras Paphos (1993–1994)
- Jānis Krūmiņš – Pafos FC (2015–2016)
- Marians Pahars – Anorthosis Famagusta FC (2006–2007)
- Andrejs Pavlovs – AEP Paphos FC (2010–2011), Olympiakos Nicosia (2011)
- Deniss Rakels – Pafos FC (2019, 2020–2021)
- Vitālijs Rečickis – Aris Limassol FC (2010)
- Reinis Reinholds – Pafos FC (2019–2020)
- Valērijs Šabala – Anorthosis Famagusta FC (2014)
- Jevgēņijs Sazonovs – Ethnikos Achna FC (2011–2012)
- Pāvels Šteinbors – Nea Salamina (2015–2016)
- Igors Tarasovs – Ethnikos Achna FC (2021–)
- Artūrs Vaičulis – AEP Paphos FC (2009–2010), AEL Limassol (2010–2011)

== Lebanon ==
- Zakaria Charara – Ermis Aradippou (2011)
- Bassel Jradi – Apollon Limassol (2021–2023) AEL Limassol (2025–)

== Liberia ==
- George Gebro – ENTHOI Lakatamia FC (2005–2006), AEL Limassol (2006–2007), Ethnikos Achna FC (2007)
- Solomon Grimes – Nea Salamina (2011–2013, 2014–2016)
- Alvin Kieh – Anorthosis Famagusta FC (2002–2003), Onisilos Sotira (2003–2004)
- Brem Soumaoro – PAEEK FC (2021–)
- Tonia Tisdell – Nea Salamina (2019–2020)
- Theo Weeks – Ermis Aradippou (2015–2016, 2017), Alki Oroklini (2019)
- Peter Wilson – Olympiakos Nicosia (2021–)
- Samuel Wowoah – Enosis Neon Paralimni FC (2006–2007)

== Lithuania ==
- Rolandas Baravykas – Nea Salamina (2020)
- Vytautas Černiauskas – Ermis Aradippou (2016)
- Edgaras Jankauskas – AEK Larnaca FC (2007)
- Šarūnas Jurevičius – APOP Kinyras Peyias FC (2010)
- Tomas Ražanauskas – Anorthosis Famagusta FC (2004–2005)
- Ernestas Šetkus – Olympiakos Nicosia (2010–2012), Nea Salamina (2013–2014)
- Emilijus Zubas – AEK Larnaca FC (2013)

== Luxembourg ==
- Tim Hall – Ethnikos Achna FC (2021–)
- Vahid Selimović – Apollon Limassol (2019–2020)

== Macau ==
- Filipe Duarte – Apollon Limassol (2005–2007)

== Malawi ==
- Tawonga Chimodzi – AEZ Zakakiou (2016–2017)

== Mali ==
- Mamadi Berthe – Olympiakos Nicosia (2008)
- Senou Coulibaly – AC Omonia (2023–)
- Mamadou Djikiné – Olympiakos Nicosia (2012–2013)
- Tenema N'Diaye – Nea Salamina (2013)
- Bakary Sako – Pafos FC (2019–2020)
- Mahamadou Sidibè – Ethnikos Achna FC (2008–2009), AC Omonia (2009–2010)

== Malta ==
- Orosco Anonam – APOEL FC (2002)
- Steve Borg – Aris Limassol FC (2015–2016)
- Luke Dimech – AEK Larnaca FC (2010–2012)
- Andrew Hogg – Enosis Neon Paralimni FC (2012–2013)
- Udo Nwoko – Doxa Katokopias FC (2010)
- André Schembri – AC Omonia (2012–2014, 2015–2016), Apollon Limassol (2017–2019)

== Martinique ==
- Christopher Glombard – Alki Oroklini (2018), Ethnikos Achna FC (2019–2020)
- Geoffrey Malfleury – Alki Oroklini (2018)

== Mauritania ==
- Dominique Da Silva – Ermis Aradippou (2016)
- Diallo Guidileye – AEL Limassol (2014–2015)
- Moise Kandé – AEL Limassol (2007–2008)
- Yoann Langlet – Enosis Neon Paralimni FC (2012–2013)

== Mauritius ==
- Kévin Bru – Apollon Limassol (2018–2019)

== Mexico ==
- Jorge Enríquez – AC Omonia (2018)
- Raúl Gudiño – APOEL FC (2017–2018)
- Guillermo Ochoa – AEL Limassol (2025–)
- Édgar Pacheco – Ermis Aradippou (2017–2018)

== Moldova ==
- Evgheni Hmaruc – Nea Salamina (2002–2003)

== Montenegro ==
- Srđan Blažić – Anorthosis Famagusta FC (2012), Nea Salamina (2013–2014)
- Vladimir Boljević – AEK Larnaca FC (2014–2017), Doxa Katokopias FC (2018–2021)
- Mijuško Bojović – Enosis Neon Paralimni FC (2015–2016)
- Miodrag Božović – APOP Paphos (1996–1997)
- Siniša Dobrasinović – Apollon Limassol (2000–2002), Digenis Morphou (2002–2005), AC Omonia (2005–2008), Anorthosis Famagusta FC (2008–2009)
- Radislav Dragićević – APOP Kinyras Peyias FC (2005–2006)
- Andrija Dragojević – Karmiotissa FC (2016–2017)
- Dragan Đukanović – AC Omonia (1995–1996)
- Duško Đurišić – Apollon Limassol (2008–2009)
- Novica Eraković – AC Omonia (2023–)
- Vanja Grubač – Digenis Morphou (2003–2004)
- Sergej Grubač – APOEL FC (2017–2018)
- Deni Hočko – Pafos FC (2021–)
- Stevan Jovetić – AC Omonia (2024–)
- Vasko Kalezić – Anagennisi Dherynia (2016)
- Petar Kasom – AEP Paphos FC (2006–2007)
- Dragan Maraš – AEP Paphos FC (2004)
- Dejan Peković – Apollon Limassol (1999–2000)
- Goran Perišić – Olympiakos Nicosia (2001–2002)
- Miloš Radanović – Olympiakos Nicosia (2006–2007)
- Dušan Radojević – Ethnikos Achna FC (1998–1999)
- Aleksandar Madžar – AEP Paphos FC (2003–2004)
- Savo Pavićević – AC Omonia (2012), Anorthosis Famagusta FC (2013–2014)
- Momčilo Rašo – AEL Limassol (2018, 2019–2021)
- Marko Vidović – Anorthosis Famagusta FC (2010)
- Vladimir Volkov – Ermis Aradippou (2018)
- Mihajlo Vujačić – Alki Larnaca FC (2002–2003)
- Nikola Vukčević – Ethnikos Achna FC (2011–2012)
- Simon Vukčević – Enosis Neon Paralimni FC (2015–2016)
- Dejan Vukićević – Pezoporikos Larnaca (1993–1994)

== Montserrat ==
- Corrin Brooks-Meade – Alki Larnaca FC (2010–2013), Ermis Aradippou (2011–2012), AC Omonia (2013–2014), Nea Salamina (2014–2015), Ethnikos Achna FC (2015–2016)
- Kenny Dyer – Nea Salamina (1988–1991), Ethnikos Achna FC (1992–1995, 1996–1999)

== Morocco ==
- Saad Agouzoul – AC Omonia (2025–)
- Samir Bengelloun – APOP Kinyras Peyias FC (2008–2010)
- Tarik Bengelloun – Enosis Neon Paralimni FC (2011)
- Chakib Benzoukane – Apollon Limassol (2012)
- Mohammed Chaouch – APOEL FC (1999–2000)
- Issam Chebake – APOEL FC (2021–)
- Karim Fegrouche – AEL Limassol (2013–2015)
- Rachid Hamdani – Apollon Limassol (2011–2015)
- Amine Khammas – Apollon Limassol (2021–)
- Abdelkarim Kissi – Enosis Neon Paralimni FC (2007–2008), Apollon Limassol (2008), AEK Larnaca FC (2009), Ermis Aradippou (2009–2010), Ethnikos Achna FC (2010–2012)
- Ryan Mmaee – AEL Limassol (2019–2021)
- Hamid Rhanem – Ayia Napa FC (2007), Enosis Neon Paralimni FC (2007), AEK Larnaca FC (2008), APOP Kinyras Peyias FC (2009)
- Khalid Sinouh – AC Omonia (2005–2006)
- Anuar Tuhami – APOEL FC (2020–2021)
- Jaouad Zairi – Anorthosis Famagusta FC (2012)

== Mozambique ==
- Fumo – Atromitos Yeroskipou (2008), APEP FC (2009)
- Genito – Nea Salamina (2009–2010)
- Eduardo Jumisse – Ermis Aradippou (2011)
- Manuel Lopes – APOP Kinyras Peyias FC (2011)
- Dário Monteiro – Nea Salamina (2007–2008)
- Nuro Tualibudane – Nea Salamina (1997–1998)

== Netherlands ==
- Kiran Bechan – Ermis Aradippou (2009–2010)
- Hans Borsboom – APOP Paphos FC (1987–1988)
- Pim Bouwman – Enosis Neon Paralimni FC (2015–2016), Ermis Aradippou (2016–2017, 2018)
- Nicandro Breeveld – AC Omonia (2017–2018)
- Joost Broerse – APOEL FC (2008–2011)
- Marvin Brunswijk – Anorthosis Famagusta FC (2002–2003)
- Simo Choukoud – Pafos FC (2018–2019)
- Jürgen Colin – Anorthosis Famagusta FC (2011–2013)
- Martin Cruijff – AEK Larnaca FC (2002–2003)
- Tom Daemen – AEK Larnaca FC (2012–2013), Enosis Neon Paralimni FC (2013), Aris Limassol FC (2014)
- Tijn Daverveld – AEL Limassol (2021–)
- Jordy Deckers – Ermis Aradippou (2016)
- Orhan Dzepar – Olympiakos Nicosia (2025–)
- Donny de Groot – AEK Larnaca FC (2006–2007)
- Tim de Cler – AEK Larnaca FC (2011–2013)
- Lorenzo Ebecilio – APOEL FC (2017–2018)
- Carel Eiting – AC Omonia (2025–)
- Bert Esselink – PAEEK FC (2021–)
- Navarone Foor – Pafos FC (2020–)
- Serginho Greene – AEK Larnaca FC (2013, 2014), Othellos Athienou F.C. (2015)
- Kevin Hofland – AEK Larnaca FC (2010–2012)
- Nicky Hofs – AEL Limassol (2010–2011)
- Pascal Heije – APEP FC (2009)
- Hector Hevel – AEK Larnaca FC (2017–2020)
- Fouad Idabdelhay – AEL Limassol (2013–2014)
- Kevin Jansen – PAEEK FC (2021–)
- René Klomp – Ethnikos Achna FC (2002–2003)
- Jeffrey Leiwakabessy – Anorthosis Famagusta FC (2008–2011)
- Edwin Linssen – AEK Larnaca FC (2010–2013)
- Nassir Maachi – AEK Larnaca FC (2012–2014), Pafos FC (2015–2016), Nea Salamina (2016–2017), Alki Oroklini (2018)
- Darren Maatsen – Ayia Napa FC (2015)
- Hedwiges Maduro – AC Omonia (2017–2018)
- Hilmi Mihçi – Enosis Neon Paralimni FC (2006)
- Cendrino Misidjan – Ermis Aradippou (2015)
- Beau Molenaar – Apollon Limassol (2007)
- Junas Naciri – Enosis Neon Paralimni FC (2006–2007)
- Rene Osei Kofi – Aris Limassol FC (2013)
- Humphrey Rudge – Apollon Limassol (2004–2005)
- Danny Schenkel – AEK Larnaca FC (2010–2011)
- Bernard Schuiteman – Apollon Limassol (2002–2003)
- Stefano Seedorf – Apollon Limassol (2007)
- Joost Terol – AEP Paphos FC (2008)
- Thijs Timmermans – PAEEK FC (2021–)
- Arsenio Valpoort – Ermis Aradippou (2021)
- Pele van Anholt – Enosis Neon Paralimni FC (2020–2021)
- Jochem van der Hoeven – AEP Paphos FC (2004–2005)
- Gregoor van Dijk – AEK Larnaca FC (2010–2013)
- Ronny Van Es – AEP Paphos FC (2008)
- John van Loen – APOEL FC (1988–1989)
- Piet Velthuizen – AC Omonia (2017)
- Boy Waterman – APOEL FC (2015–2020)
- Nordin Wooter – Anorthosis Famagusta FC (2005–2006), AEK Larnaca FC (2007)
- Mike Zonneveld – AEL Limassol (2010–2011)

== Netherlands Antilles ==
- Civard Sprockel – Anorthosis Famagusta FC (2011–2012), Othellos Athienou F.C. (2015)
- Raymond Victoria – AEK Larnaca FC (2006–2007)

== New Zealand ==
- Billy Wright – Apollon Limassol (1983–1984)

== Nigeria ==
- Shehu Abdullahi – Anorthosis Famagusta FC (2016–2018), AC Omonia (2020–)
- Mutiu Adepoju – AEL Limassol (2003–2004)
- Kabiru Akinsola – Doxa Katokopias FC (2013)
- Abdul Jeleel Ajagun – AC Omonia (2019)
- Rasheed Alabi – Doxa Katokopias FC (2007–2008), AC Omonia (2008–2014), Pafos FC (2015–2016)
- Yakubu Alfa – AEK Larnaca FC (2011–2012)
- Jeremiah Ani – APOP Kinyras Peyias FC (2011)
- Iyayi Atiemwen – AC Omonia (2021–)
- Haruna Babangida – Apollon Limassol (2007–2009)
- Femi Balogun – Ermis Aradippou (2015)
- Mathew Boniface – Aris Limassol FC (2015–2016)
- George Datoru – AEK Larnaca FC (2004–2006)
- Babajide David – AC Omonia (2020)
- Efion Egbeniogh – Onisilos Sotira (2003–2004)
- Eric Ejiofor – Enosis Neon Paralimni FC (2005–2009)
- Richard Eromoigbe – Anorthosis Famagusta FC (2011)
- Andrew Esealuka – APEP FC (2008), Aris Limassol FC (2009)
- Joseph Femi – Ayia Napa FC (2015)
- Nosa Igiebor – Anorthosis Famagusta FC (2018–2019)
- Harmony Ikande – Aris Limassol FC (2016)
- Fidelis Irhene – AEL Limassol (2017–2019), Doxa Katokopias FC (2019)
- Blessing Kaku – Enosis Neon Paralimni FC (2008)
- Sani Kaita – Olympiakos Nicosia (2012)
- Felix Kennedy – AEP Paphos FC (2006–2007)
- Sunny Kingsley – AEK Larnaca FC (2006–2008, 2010–2012)
- Pascal Kondaponi – Ayia Napa FC (2007)
- Henry Makinwa – AEP Paphos FC (2004–2005)
- Joseph Nwafor – Doxa Katokopias FC (2002–2003), AEK Larnaca FC (2008)
- Charles Obi – Doxa Katokopias FC (2008)
- Michael Obiku – Anorthosis Famagusta FC (1989–2002, 1999–2000), APOEL FC (2000–2001)
- Wole Odegbami – EPA Larnaca FC (1989–1991), Enosis Neon Paralimni FC (1991–1993)
- Felix Ogbuke – Apollon Limassol (2010–2011)
- Ganiu Ogungbe – AC Omonia (2013–2014), Ethnikos Achna FC (2014–2016)
- Eze Vincent Okeuhie – Apollon Limassol (2013–2014), Nea Salamina (2014–2015), AC Omonia (2015–2016)
- Emmanuel Okoduwa – Enosis Neon Paralimni FC (2012–2013)
- Ejike Okoh – Ermis Aradippou (2020–2021)
- Charles Okonkwo – AC Omonia (1989)
- Victor Olatunji – AEK Larnaca FC (2021–)
- Azubuike Oliseh – AEK Larnaca FC (2005–2007), Ermis Aradippou (2010)
- Emmanuel Okoye – Aris Limassol FC (2013–2014), Pafos FC (2015–2016)
- Kingsley Onuegbu – Nea Salamina (2018–2020)
- Benjamin Onwuachi – APOEL FC (2008–2009), AEL Limassol (2011)
- Chidi Onyemah – Olympiakos Nicosia (2010–2013), Ethnikos Achna FC (2013–2014), Nea Salamina (2014–2015)
- Ifeanyi Onyilo – Ermis Aradippou (2014–2015), Aris Limassol FC (2016)
- David Opara – APEP FC (2008–2009)
- Waheed Oseni – Apollon Limassol (2008–2012), Ethnikos Achna FC (2012)
- Ibrahim Salau – Enosis Neon Paralimni FC (2013)
- Monday Shinshima – Enosis Neon Paralimni FC (2013)
- Sunny – Pafos FC (2019)
- Marco Tagbajumi – Ermis Aradippou (2013–2014), AEL Limassol (2014–2015)
- Chigozie Udoji – Enosis Neon Paralimni FC (2018–2021)
- Francis Uzoho – Anorthosis Famagusta FC (2019), AC Omonia (2019–2020, 2021–), APOEL FC (2020–2021)

== North Macedonia ==
- Armend Alimi – Nea Salamina (2013), Ermis Aradippou (2013–2014)
- Martin Bogatinov – Ermis Aradippou (2014–2015), Ethnikos Achna FC (2015–2018, 2019–)
- Mite Cikarski – Ethnikos Achna FC (2016–2018)
- Aleksandar Damčevski – Ermis Aradippou (2017–2018)
- Vlatko Drobarov – Aris Limassol FC (2017–2018)
- Filip Gačevski – Enosis Neon Paralimni FC (2020–2021)
- Nikola Gligorov – Alki Larnaca FC (2011–2013)
- Ivica Gligorovski – Ethnikos Achna FC (2004–2005)
- Darko Glishikj – Doxa Katokopias FC (2021)
- Vlatko Grozdanoski – AC Omonia (2004–2007), AEL Limassol (2010)
- Boban Grnčarov – APOEL FC (2009–2011)
- Ǵorǵi Hristov – Olympiakos Nicosia (2007)
- Besart Ibraimi – Enosis Neon Paralimni FC (2014), Ermis Aradippou (2014–2015)
- Stojan Ignatov – Ethnikos Achna FC (2010–2012)
- Filip Ivanovski – Ethnikos Achna FC (2010–2011)
- Igor Jančevski – Enosis Neon Paralimni FC (2006–2008)
- Marko Jovanovski – Ethnikos Achna FC (2012–2013)
- Hristijan Kirovski – Ethnikos Achna FC (2006), Apollon Limassol (2011–2012)
- Jovan Kostovski – Ethnikos Achna FC (2019–2021)
- Goran Lazarevski – APOEL FC (2000–2001), AEK Larnaca FC (2004–2005)
- Bojan Markovski – Enosis Neon Paralimni FC (2009–2012), Apollon Limassol (2012–2013), Ayia Napa FC (2014–2015), Ethnikos Achna FC (2019–2020)
- Kire Markoski – AEL Limassol (2018, 2019–2020)
- Petar Miloševski – Enosis Neon Paralimni FC (2005–2012)
- Zoran Miserdovski – Apollon Limassol (2001–2003)
- Risto Mitrevski – Enosis Neon Paralimni FC (2019)
- Daniel Mojsov – AEK Larnaca FC (2016–2021)
- Valmir Nafiu – APOEL FC (2015)
- Riste Naumov – AC Omonia (2006–2007), Ethnikos Achna FC (2008)
- Jane Nikolovski – APOEL FC (2007–2008), AEP Paphos FC (2009–2010)
- Edin Nuredinoski – Ethnikos Achna FC (2009–2012), Aris Limassol FC (2015–2016, 2017–2018), Ermis Aradippou (2016–2017)
- Kire Ristevski – AEL Limassol (2021–)
- Damjan Šiškovski – Doxa Katokopias FC (2020–)
- Vanče Šikov – Ethnikos Achna FC (2008–2011)
- Ostoja Stjepanović – AEL Limassol (2016)
- Milan Stojanovski – APOEL FC (2004–2005)
- Filip Timov – Aris Limassol FC (2013–2014)
- Aleksandar Todorovski – APOEL FC (2005–2006), Digenis Morphou (2006–2007), AEL Limassol (2007–2008)
- Vančo Trajčev – Ethnikos Achna FC (2000–2002, 2004–2005), AEK Larnaca FC (2002–2003)
- Dushko Trajchevski – Alki Oroklini (2018–2019), Doxa Katokopias FC (2019–)
- Ivan Tričkovski – Enosis Neon Paralimni FC (2009–2010), APOEL FC (2010–2012), AEK Larnaca FC (2016–)
- Krste Velkovski – Enosis Neon Paralimni FC (2010)
- Davor Zdravkovski – AEL Limassol (2017–2023, 2025–)

== Northern Ireland ==
- Tommy Cassidy – APOEL FC (1983–1984)
- Kyle Lafferty – Anorthosis Famagusta FC (2021)

== Norway ==
- Haitam Aleesami – Apollon Limassol (2021–)
- Fredrik Haugen – AEK Larnaca FC (2021)
- Abdisalam Ibrahim – Pafos FC (2019)
- Lloyd Lislevand – Anagennisi Dherynia (1997–1998)
- Marius Lundemo – APOEL FC (2020–)
- John Arne Riise – APOEL FC (2014–2015)
- Ghayas Zahid – APOEL FC (2017–2019)

== Palestine ==
- Saado Abdel Salam Fouflia – Ermis Aradippou (2020–2021)

== Panama ==
- Gabriel Gómez – Ermis Aradippou (2010)
- Tony Taylor – AC Omonia (2013–2014)

== Peru ==
- Manuel Barreto – APOEL FC (2007)
- Francisco Bazán – Anorthosis Famagusta FC (2006–2007), Olympiakos Nicosia (2006)
- Alex Becerra – Olympiakos Nicosia (2005–2006, 2007)
- Alfonso Dulanto – APOEL FC (1997–1998, 1999)
- Julio García – AEL Limassol (2008), Enosis Neon Paralimni FC (2009)
- Gianfranco Labarthe – Apollon Limassol (2012)
- Jorge Ramírez – Olympiakos Nicosia (2005–2006)
- Hernán Rengifo – AC Omonia (2010–2011)

== Poland ==
- Waldemar Adamczyk – Aris Limassol FC (2005)
- Karol Angielski – AEK Larnaca FC (2024–)
- Henryk Bałuszyński – Enosis Neon Paralimni FC (2002–2003)
- Krzysztof Bukalski – Nea Salamina (2002–2003)
- Radosław Cierzniak – Alki Larnaca FC (2011–2012)
- Maciej Czyżniewski – Nea Salamina (2012)
- Łukasz Gieresz – Atromitos Yeroskipou (2008–2009)
- Łukasz Gikiewicz – AC Omonia (2013–2014), AEL Limassol (2014)
- Zbigniew Grzybowski – Olympiakos Nicosia (2007–2008)
- Roger Guerreiro – Aris Limassol FC (2015)
- Bartłomiej Jamróz – Alki Larnaca FC (2004–2005), APOEL FC (2005)
- Piotr Janczukowicz – Enosis Neon Paralimni FC (2024–)
- Marcin Juszczyk – Nea Salamina (2009)
- Radosław Kałużny – AEL Limassol (2006–2007)
- Paweł Kapsa – Alki Larnaca FC (2012), Olympiakos Nicosia (2012–2013)
- Krzysztof Kłosiński – Nea Salamina (2004–2006)
- Ernest Konon – Enosis Neon Paralimni FC (2001–2003)
- Kamil Kosowski – APOEL FC (2008–2010), Apollon Limassol (2010–2011)
- Rafał Kosznik – AC Omonia (2009)
- Wojciech Kowalewski – Anorthosis Famagusta FC (2011)
- Wojciech Kowalczyk – Anorthosis Famagusta FC (2001–2003), APOEL FC (2003–2004)
- Grzegorz Krychowiak – Anorthosis Famagusta FC (2024–)
- Andrzej Krzyształowicz – APOEL FC (2006)
- Jarosław Krzyżanowski – AEL Limassol (2005)
- Patryk Lipski – Ethnikos Achna FC (2023–)
- Jakub Łabojko – AEK Larnaca FC (2022)
- Adam Marciniak – AEK Larnaca FC (2015–2016)
- Arkadiusz Malarz – AEL Limassol (2010–2011), Ethnikos Achna FC (2012–2013)
- Sławomir Majak – Anorthosis Famagusta FC (2001–2002, 2003–2004)
- Stefan Majewski – Apollon Limassol (1988–1989)
- Miłosz Matysik – Aris Limassol FC (2024–)
- Radosław Michalski – Anorthosis Famagusta FC (2001–2004), Apollon Limassol (2005–2007)
- Olgierd Moskalewicz – AEL Limassol (2005)
- Mateusz Musialowski – AC Omonia (2024–)
- Mariusz Nosal – AEK Larnaca FC (2005)
- Emmanuel Olisadebe – APOP Kinyras Peyias FC (2007–2008)
- Dariusz Pasieka – Nea Salamina (1993–1995)
- Mateusz Piątkowski – APOEL FC (2015–2016)
- Arkadiusz Piech – AEL Limassol (2016), Apollon Limassol (2016–2017)
- Mariusz Piekarski – Anorthosis Famagusta FC (2002–2003)
- Jarosław Popiela – APOEL FC (2006)
- Patryk Procek – Ethnikos Achna FC (2016–2018), AEL Limassol (2018–2021), PAEEK FC (2021–2022)
- Eugeniusz Ptak – Apollon Limassol (1989–1992), Nea Salamina (1992–1993)
- Grzegorz Rasiak – AEL Limassol (2010–2011)
- Tomasz Sajdak – Alki Larnaca FC (2009)
- Maciej Scherfchen – AEP Paphos FC (2010)
- Paweł Sibik – Apollon Limassol (2002–2003, 2005–2006)
- Adrian Sikora – APOEL FC (2009–2011)
- Łukasz Skowron – AEL Limassol (2015–2016)
- Paweł Sobczak – Anorthosis Famagusta FC (2003)
- Artur Sobiech – Ethnikos Achna FC (2024–)
- Łukasz Sosin – Apollon Limassol (2002–2007), Anorthosis Famagusta FC (2007–2009), Aris Limassol FC (2011–2012)
- Adam Stachowiak – Anorthosis Famagusta FC (2011–2012)
- Mariusz Stępiński – Aris Limassol FC (2021–)
- Karol Struski – Aris Limassol FC (2022–)
- Mateusz Szczepaniak – Enosis Neon Paralimni FC (2019–2020)
- Mateusz Taudul – AEK Larnaca FC (2015–2016), AEZ Zakakiou (2016–2017), Othellos Athienou FC (2023–2024)
- Krzysztof Walczak – Nea Salamina (1992–1994)
- Tomasz Wełna – Aris Limassol FC (2016–2017)
- Kamil Wojtkowski – Ethnikos Achna FC (2022)
- Bogdan Zając – Nea Salamina (2004–2006)
- Maciej Zając – Ayia Napa FC (2012)
- Marcin Żewłakow – APOEL FC (2008–2010)
- Maciej Żurawski – AC Omonia (2009–2010)

== Portugal ==
- Abel Pereira – Doxa Katokopias FC (2012–2014, 2016)
- Alex Soares – AC Omonia (2017–2019)
- Alberto Louzeiro – Aris Limassol FC (2012)
- Alhandra – Enosis Neon Paralimni FC (2008–2009)
- André Geraldes – APOEL FC (2020–2021)
- André Queirós – Apollon Limassol (2008)
- André Teixeira – AEL Limassol (2017–)
- André Vidigal – APOEL FC (2019–2020)
- António Semedo – Alki Larnaca FC (2011)
- Artur Jorge – APOEL FC (2020–2021)
- Barge – Alki Larnaca FC (2012–2013)
- Benny – Doxa Katokopias FC (2021–)
- Bernardo Vasconcelos – APOP Kinyras Peyias FC (2007, 2008–2009), AC Omonia (2008), AEP Paphos FC (2009–2010, 2011), Alki Larnaca FC (2011–2013), Doxa Katokopias FC (2015)
- Bruno Aguiar – AC Omonia (2009–2014)
- Bruno Pinheiro – Aris Limassol FC (2009–2010)
- Bruno Vale – Apollon Limassol (2012–2019)
- Cadú – AEL Limassol (2014)
- José António Calado – APOP Kinyras Peyias FC (2007–2008), AEP Paphos FC (2008–2009)
- Carlos André – Doxa Katokopias FC (2008–2010, 2012–2013), Olympiakos Nicosia (2010–2012)
- Carlos Marques – APOP Kinyras Peyias FC (2007–2011), AEL Limassol (2011), Alki Larnaca FC (2011), Olympiakos Nicosia (2012), Doxa Katokopias FC (2012–2014, 2016–2017), Pafos FC (2015–2016)
- Carlos Milhazes – Enosis Neon Paralimni FC (2012–2013)
- Carlitos – Doxa Katokopias FC (2013–2014, 2015–2016, 2019–2021), AEL Limassol (2014–2015), Anorthosis Famagusta FC (2016–2018)
- Castanheira – Doxa Katokopias FC (2012–2013)
- China – Ermis Aradippou (2013–2015, 2017–2018), Nea Salamina (2015–2017)
- Comboio – Doxa Katokopias FC (2008–2010), Aris Limassol FC (2011–2012)
- Cris – AEP Paphos FC (2012–2013)
- Cristovão – AEP Paphos FC (2008–2009), Anorthosis Famagusta FC (2009–2012), AC Omonia (2014–2016)
- Daniel Carriço – AEL Limassol (2008)
- David Caiado – Olympiakos Nicosia (2010–2011)
- Davide – Apollon Limassol (2011)
- Diogo Luís – Apollon Limassol (2009)
- Diogo Ramos – Doxa Katokopias FC (2014–2015)
- Diogo Rosado – Ermis Aradippou (2016)
- Diogo Vila – AEK Larnaca FC (2011)
- Dosa Júnior – Digenis Morphou (2006–2007), AEP Paphos FC (2008–2009), AEL Limassol (2009–2012, 2016–2020)
- Duarte Valente – Karmiotissa FC (2021)
- Edgar – Alki Larnaca FC (2008)
- Edgar Marcelino – AC Omonia (2006–2008), APOP Kinyras Peyias FC (2009–2010), AEP Paphos FC (2013)
- Edú – AEL Limassol (2013–2014)
- Élio – Doxa Katokopias FC (2010)
- Eugenio Neves – Nea Salamina (2009)
- Fabeta – Ayia Napa FC (2012)
- Fausto – Ayia Napa FC (2012–2013)
- Filipe Azevedo – AEL Limassol (2008)
- Filipe da Costa – Enosis Neon Paralimni FC (2012)
- Gabi – Nea Salamina (2014)
- Gilberto Silva – Ermis Aradippou (2009–2010)
- Gilson Costa – Doxa Katokopias FC (2020–2021)
- Ginho – Ayia Napa FC (2012–2013)
- Gonçalo Abreu – Ermis Aradippou (2013)
- Gonçalo Santos – Ethnikos Achna FC (2020–2021)
- Gus Ledes – AEK Larnaca FC (2021–)
- Henrique Gomez – Olympiakos Nicosia (2025–)
- Hélder Cabral – APOEL FC (2013–2014), AC Omonia (2015–2016)
- Hélder Castro – Olympiakos Nicosia (2012–2013, 2017–2018), AEK Larnaca FC (2013–2014)
- Hélder Sousa – Olympiakos Nicosia (2010–2012), APOEL FC (2012)
- Helio Pinto – Apollon Limassol (2005–2006), APOEL FC (2006–2013)
- Hélio Roque – AEL Limassol (2007–2012), Nea Salamina (2011–2014, 2017)
- Henrique – Doxa Katokopias FC (2009–2010), AEL Limassol (2011–2012), Olympiakos Nicosia (2012–2013), Ermis Aradippou (2013–2014), Nea Salamina (2014–2015)
- Hugo Coelho – Olympiakos Nicosia (2008), AEP Paphos FC (2008–2010)
- Hugo Faria – Enosis Neon Paralimni FC (2008–2013)
- Hugo Machado – Apollon Limassol (2005–2006), Olympiakos Nicosia (2006–2008), Alki Larnaca FC (2008–2009)
- Hugo Costa – Atromitos Yeroskipou (2008)
- Hugo Firmino – Doxa Katokopias FC (2020)
- Hugo Moutinho – Aris Limassol FC (2013), AEK Kouklia FC (2014)
- Hugo Simões – Enosis Neon Paralimni FC (2009)
- Hugo Soares – Anagennisi Dherynia (2011–2012), Ayia Napa FC (2012–2013), Ethnikos Achna FC (2013–2014)
- Hugo Sousa – AEL Limassol (2012), AEP Paphos FC (2012–2013)
- Igor Pita – Doxa Katokopias FC (2010)
- Ivo Afonso – Olympiakos Nicosia (2006–2007)
- Jaime – Apollon Limassol (2015–2016)
- João Alves – AC Omonia (2012–2013)
- João Aurélio – Pafos FC (2020–)
- João Paiva – Apollon Limassol (2005–2007), AEK Larnaca FC (2008)
- João Paulo Andrade – AC Omonia (2012–2014), Apollon Limassol (2014–2015), AEL Limassol (2015–2016)
- João Paulo Lopes Caetano – Doxa Katokopias FC (2008), Atromitos Yeroskipou (2008–2009), APEP FC (2009–2010)
- João Paulo – Olympiakos Nicosia (2010–2011), Apollon Limassol (2011–2012)
- João Pedro – Ethnikos Achna FC (2009–2010)
- João Pedro – Apollon Limassol (2015–2021)
- João Tavares – Olympiakos Nicosia (2025–)
- Joãozinho – APOEL FC (2019)
- Joca – AEL Limassol (2007–2009), Ermis Aradippou (2009–2010)
- Joel Pereira – Doxa Katokopias FC (2018–2019), AC Omonia (2019)
- Jorge – AEK Kouklia FC (2013–2014), Anagennisi Dherynia (2016–2017)
- Jorge Matos – APEP FC (2005–2006)
- Jorge Teixeira – Atromitos Yeroskipou (2008), AEP Paphos FC (2009)
- José de Sousa – Olympiakos Nicosia – (2008)
- José Moreira – AC Omonia – (2013–2015)
- Júnior – Doxa Katokopias FC (2007–2008), AEL Limassol (2008–2010), Olympiakos Nicosia (2010–2011)
- Kikas – Doxa Katokopias FC (2020–2021)
- Kiko – Olympiakos Nicosia – (2019–2020), AC Omonia (2020–)
- Leandro Silva – AEL Limassol (2017–2019)
- Luís Loureiro – Anorthosis Famagusta FC (2007)
- Luís Miguel – APOP Kinyras Peyias FC (2008), Enosis Neon Paralimni FC (2009)
- Luís Torres – Doxa Katokopias FC (2009), Ethnikos Achna FC (2009–2011)
- Mangualde – Doxa Katokopias FC (2009–2010)
- Manú – Ermis Aradippou (2014, 2015)
- Márcio Meira – Ermis Aradippou (2020–2021)
- Marco Almeida – Nea Salamina (2008)
- Marco Bicho – Doxa Katokopias FC (2009–2010)
- Marco Paixão – Ethnikos Achna FC (2012–2013)
- Margaça – Doxa Katokopias FC (2008–2010), AEK Larnaca FC (2010–2011), AC Omonia (2011–2017)
- Mário Carlos – Alki Larnaca FC (2007–2008)
- Mário Sérgio – APOEL FC (2012–2016), Apollon Limassol (2017)
- Mario Silva – Doxa Katokopias FC (2009)
- Marquinhos – Ayia Napa FC (2012)
- Medeiros – AC Omonia (2007), APOP Kinyras Peyias FC (2008)
- Mickaël Meira – AEL Limassol (2014)
- Miguel Ângelo – APOP Kinyras Peyias FC (2010–2011)
- Miguel Fidalgo – AEK Larnaca FC (2006–2007)
- Miguel Oliveira – Ermis Aradippou (2009–2011)
- Miguel Pedro – Anorthosis Famagusta FC (2010), Ermis Aradippou (2010–2011)
- Miguel Silva – APOEL FC (2020–2021)
- Miguelito – Apollon Limassol (2012–2013)
- Miguelito – Olympiakos Nicosia (2017–2018), Ethnikos Achna FC (2019–2021)
- Milton – Doxa Katokopias FC (2008–2009)
- Monteiro – AEL Limassol (2011–2014), AEK Larnaca FC (2015–2016), Ermis Aradippou (2018)
- Nandinho – Alki Larnaca FC (2007–2009)
- Nélson – AEK Larnaca FC (2017–2018)
- Nuno Assis – AC Omonia (2012–2016)
- Nuno Lopes – Apollon Limassol (2015–2016), Aris Limassol FC (2021–)
- Nuno Morais – APOEL FC (2007–2019)
- Nuno Rodrigues – Doxa Katokopias FC (2007–2010)
- Oliveira – Ethnikos Achna FC (2012)
- Paiva – Doxa Katokopias FC (2009–2010)
- Paulo Adriano – AEK Larnaca FC (2006)
- Paulo Alves – Doxa Katokopias FC (2014)
- Paulo Costa – Aris Limassol FC (2007), Anorthosis Famagusta FC (2008), APOEL FC (2009), APOP Kinyras Peyias FC (2010), Ermis Aradippou (2010)
- Paulo Gomes – Atromitos Yeroskipou (2008–2009)
- Paulo Jorge – APOEL FC (2009–2012), Anorthosis Famagusta FC (2012–2014), Doxa Katokopias FC (2014–2015)
- Paulo Sereno – Doxa Katokopias FC (2010)
- Paulo Sérgio – AEL Limassol (2012–2013)
- Paulo Sousa – APOP Kinyras Peyias FC (2007)
- Pedro Almeida – Anorthosis Famagusta FC (2012)
- Pedro Duarte – Doxa Katokopias FC (2008–2010), Olympiakos Nicosia (2010–2013)
- Pedro Lemos – Ermis Aradippou (2020–2021)
- Pedro Moita – AEK Larnaca FC (2005–2006)
- Pedro Monteiro – Apollon Limassol (2016)
- Pedro Moutinho – AEP Paphos FC (2010)
- Pedro Pereira – Doxa Katokopias FC (2008), Atromitos Yeroskipou (2008–2009)
- Pelé – Anorthosis Famagusta FC (2015–2016)
- Rafael Lopes – AC Omonia (2017–2018)
- Riera – Ayia Napa FC (2012)
- Ricardo Catchana – Ayia Napa FC (2012–2013), Enosis Neon Paralimni FC (2013)
- Ricardo Fernandes – APOEL FC (2005–2007), Anorthosis Famagusta FC (2009), AEL Limassol (2010), Doxa Katokopias FC (2012–2014, 2014–2015), AC Omonia (2014)
- Ricardo Sousa – AC Omonia (2007)
- Romeu Torres – Olympiakos Nicosia (2017–2018)
- Rúben Brígido – Ermis Aradippou (2015), Anagennisi Dherynia (2016–2017), Nea Salamina (2017–2018)
- Ruca – Alki Oroklini (2018)
- Rui Andrade – Doxa Katokopias FC (2008), Atromitos Yeroskipou (2009)
- Rui Dolores – Nea Salamina (2007–2008)
- Rui Duarte – Anorthosis Famagusta FC (2013)
- Rui Figueiredo – APEP FC (2008–2009)
- Rui Lima – AC Omonia (2007), Nea Salamina (2008, 2009)
- Rui Miguel – AEL Limassol (2012–2013)
- Rui Moreira - Olympiakos Nicosia (2024–)
- Orlando Sá – AEL Limassol (2012–2014)
- Saavedra – Doxa Katokopias FC (2008–2011), Ermis Aradippou (2011), Nea Salamina (2012–2013)
- Sandro Sakho – Ermis Aradippou (2018)
- Santamaria – AEP Paphos FC (2010–2011), Alki Larnaca FC (2011–2013)
- Sebastião Nogueira – Nea Salamina (2009), Ermis Aradippou (2010–2011)
- Serginho – Ermis Aradippou (2009–2010)
- Sérgio Conceição – Anorthosis Famagusta (2024–2025) AEL Limassol (2025–)
- Sérgio Marakis – Ermis Aradippou (2015)
- Silas – AEL Limassol (2011–2012), AEP Paphos FC (2012), Ethnikos Achna FC (2013–2014)
- Tiago Carneiro – Olympiakos Nicosia (2006–2007), APOP Kinyras Peyias FC (2008)
- Tiago Conceição – Doxa Katokopias FC (2012–2013)
- Tiago Costa – Olympiakos Nicosia (2012–2013), Doxa Katokopias FC (2013)
- Tiago Gomes – APOEL FC (2013–2015), Nea Salamina (2016), Doxa Katokopias FC (2016–2018)
- Tiago Gomes – Apollon Limassol (2016–2017)
- Tiago Lemos – Nea Salamina (2007–2008)
- Tiago Targino – AEL Limassol (2013–2014)
- Tiquinho – AEL Limassol (2007–2008), Anorthosis Famagusta FC (2008), AEK Larnaca FC (2008–2009), AEP Paphos FC (2009–2010)
- Toni – Ethnikos Achna FC (2008–2009), Apollon Limassol (2009–2013), AEK Larnaca FC (2013–2014), Ermis Aradippou (2015)
- Torrão – AC Omonia (2006–2007), Nea Salamina (2008), AEL Limassol (2008–2010)
- Vargas – APOP Kinyras Peyias FC (2007–2008), AEL Limassol (2009–2011), Ayia Napa FC (2013)
- Vieirinha – Olympiakos Nicosia (2024–)
- Vítor Gomes – AC Omonia (2019–2021)
- Vítor Lima – Ethnikos Achna FC (2012–2013)
- Vítor Afonso – Ayia Napa FC (2012–2013)
- Vítor Vinha – Nea Salamina (2009–2010)
- Wesllem – AEK Kouklia FC (2013–2014), Anagennisi Dherynia (2016–2017)
- Zé Nando – AEK Larnaca FC (2005–2007), AEL Limassol (2007–2008)
- Zé Valente – Doxa Katokopias FC (2019–2020)
- Zé Vítor – AEL Limassol (2010–2011), Apollon Limassol (2012), Enosis Neon Paralimni FC (2013)

== Paraguay ==
- Aldo Adorno – Enosis Neon Paralimni FC (2006–2007), AEK Larnaca FC (2007–2009), Apollon Limassol (2009–2011), APOEL FC (2011–2014), Ermis Aradippou (2015), Nea Salamina (2015–2016)

== Qatar ==
- Hussein Yasser – AEL Limassol (2004–2005)

== Romania ==
- Dan Alexa – Anorthosis Famagusta FC (2012–2014)
- Marius Alexe – Aris Limassol FC (2017)
- Bogdan Andone – Apollon Limassol (2003–2008), Alki Larnaca FC (2008)
- Ştefan Apostol – Digenis Morphou (2005–2006)
- Daniel Bălan – AC Omonia (2006), Alki Larnaca FC (2007–2008), Aris Limassol FC (2009–2010)
- Daniel Baston – Evagoras FC (1995)
- Paul Batin – Doxa Katokopias FC (2019)
- Alexandru Benga – Ermis Aradippou (2016–2017)
- Mugur Bolohan – Nea Salamina (2004–2007)
- Laurențiu Brănescu – AC Omonia (2015–2016)
- Stelian Carabaș – AEL Limassol (2003–2004), Anorthosis Famagusta FC (2005–2007)
- Florin Cârstea – Apollon Limassol (1998–1999), Enosis Neon Paralimni FC (1999–2000)
- Valentin Cojocaru – Apollon Limassol (2017)
- Sebastian Cojocnean – Ethnikos Achna FC (2015–2016)
- Alexandru Coman – Ethnikos Achna FC (2015)
- Nicolae Constantin – Digenis Morphou (2006–2007)
- Costea Decu – Aris Limassol FC (1996–1997)
- Ovidiu Dănănae – Apollon Limassol (2013–2014)
- Mihai Dina – Aris Limassol FC (2013–2014)
- Laurenţiu Diniţă – Aris Limassol FC (2006–2008)
- Viorel Domocoş – Digenis Morphou (2005–2006)
- Vlad Dragomir – Pafos FC (2021–)
- Ion Dudan – Evagoras FC (1995–1996)
- Marco Ehmann – Enosis Neon Paralimni (2022–)
- Andrei Enescu – Ethnikos Achna FC (2016–2018)
- Adrian Falub – Digenis Morphou (2002–2006)
- Dragoş Firţulescu – Alki Larnaca FC – (2011)
- Constantin Frățilă – AC Omonia (1973–1974)
- Daniel Florea – APOEL FC (2006–2009)
- George Florescu – AC Omonia (2016–2017)
- George Galamaz – Anorthosis Famagusta (2013–2014)
- Bogdan Gavrilă – Ethnikos Achna FC (2016–2018)
- Ion Geolgău – Aris Limassol (1990–1991)
- Răzvan Grădinaru – Karmiotissa (2022–)
- Nicolae Grigore – Apollon Limassol (2014)
- Ștefan Grigorie – Apollon Limassol (2013)
- Adrian Iencsi – Apollon Limassol (2007–2008)
- Claudiu Ionescu – Aris Limassol FC (2011–2012)
- Alexandru Iacob – Ethnikos Achna FC (2015–2016)
- Alexandru Ioniță – AEL Limassol (2014–2015), Aris Limassol FC (2017–2018)
- Adrian Iordache – Alki Larnaca FC (2007–2008), AEL Limassol (2008–2009)
- Marius Iordache – Ethnikos Achna FC (2005–2007)
- Eduard Iordănescu – Alki Larnaca FC – (2001–2002)
- Emil Jula – Anorthosis Famagusta FC (2012–2013)
- Marian Ivan – Evagoras Paphos (1995–1996)
- Ionuţ Luţu – Apollon Limassol (2004)
- Tiberiu Lung – Ayia Napa FC (2006–2007)
- Florentin Matei – Apollon Limassol (2020–2021)
- Dragoş Mihalache – APOP Kinyras Peyias FC (2005)
- Adrian Mihalcea – Aris Limassol FC (2006–2008, 2009–2010), AEL Limassol (2008–2009)
- Bogdan Mitrea – AEL Limassol (2017–2018), Doxa Katokopias FC (2018–2019)
- Mihai Mocanu – AC Omonia (1972–1974)
- Costel Mozacu – Aris Limassol FC (2007–2008)
- Cristian Munteanu – AEK Larnaca FC (2005)
- Eugen Neagoe – Alki Larnaca FC (1995–1996), AC Omonia (1996–1997)
- Ionuț Neagu – Nea Salamina (2016–2017)
- Marian Neagu – Othellos Athienou F.C. (2014)
- Bănel Nicoliță – Aris Limassol FC (2017)
- Claudiu Niculescu – AC Omonia (2008)
- Emil Ninu – AEK Larnaca FC (2015–2016)
- Costel Pantilimon – AC Omonia (2020)
- Florin Pârvu – AEL Limassol (2006–2007)
- Corneliu Papură – AEL Limassol (2004–2005)
- Andrei Patranoiu – Alki Larnaca FC (2013–2014)
- Adrian Pigulea – Aris Limassol FC (1992–1993)
- Andrei Pițian – Apollon Limassol (2017–2018)
- Cornel Predescu – Aris Limassol FC (2016)
- Andrei Radu – Aris Limassol FC (2016–2018)
- Narcis Răducan – AEK Larnaca FC (2005–2006), AEL Limassol (2006–2007)
- Sorin Răducanu – Aris Limassol FC (1991–1992)
- Claudiu Răducanu – Nea Salamina (2007)
- Mihai Răduț – Aris Limassol FC (2021–)
- Cristian Sîrghi – Ermis Aradippou (2016–2017)
- Alin Mircea Savu – Digenis Morphou (2004–2005)
- Marian Savu – AEL Limassol (2002–2003)
- Ion Sburlea – Apollon Limassol (1998)
- Tibor Selymes – AEL Limassol (2004–2005)
- Gabriel Simion – Aris Limassol FC (2021–)
- Ilie Stan – AEL Limassol (1997–1998)
- Mihai Stere – Nea Salamina (2004–2006), Aris Limassol (2006–2008)
- Valentin Ştefan – AC Omonia (1995–1996)
- Pompiliu Stoica – Alki Larnaca FC (2009)
- Marius Şumudică – AC Omonia (2003–2004)
- Romeo Surdu – Apollon Limassol (2013)
- Ciprian Tănasă – Alki Larnaca FC (2012)
- Aurel Ţicleanu – Olympiakos Nicosia (1989–1991)
- Răzvan Tincu – Doxa Katokopias FC (2018–2019)
- Eugen Trică – Anorthosis Famagusta FC (2009)
- Cristian Vlad – Ayia Napa FC (2006–2007)
- Radu Zaharia – Ermis Aradippou (2017–2018)
- Nicolae Zamfir – Alki Larnaca FC (1995–1996)

== Russia ==
- Magomedkhabib Abdusalamov – Pafos FC (2021–)
- Andrey Davidovich – Nea Salamina (1993–1994)
- Aleksandr Dovbnya – Ethnikos Achna FC (2016–2018), Pafos FC (2018–2019)
- Nikita Dubov – Pafos FC (2019–2020)
- Aleksandr Filimonov – Nea Salamina (2006–2007)
- Pavel Ignatovich – Ermis Aradippou (2017)
- Yevgeni Ivanov – Apollon Limassol (2001–2002), Onisilos Sotira (2003–2004)
- Nikolai Kipiani – Ethnikos Achna FC (2016–2018), AC Omonia (2018), Ermis Aradippou (2018)
- Gennadiy Korkin – Olympiakos Nicosia (1993–1994)
- Pavel Lelyukhin – Pafos FC (2018–2021)
- Roman Oreshchuk – APOEL FC (1999–2000)
- Petr Sasykov – Olympiakos Nicosia (2006–2008)
- Aleksandr Shcherbakov – Enosis Neon Paralimni FC (2018–2019)
- Dmitri Torbinski – Pafos FC (2018)
- Akhrik Tsveiba – AEK Larnaca FC (2001–2002)
- Artur Valikaev – Olympiakos Nicosia (2018)
- Danila Yanov – Pafos FC (2020–2021)

== Rwanda ==
- Emmanuel Imanishimwe – AEL Limassol (2024–)
- Hamad Ndikumana – APOP Kinyras Peyias FC (2005–2006, 2011), Nea Salamina (2006), Anorthosis Famagusta FC (2006–2008), AC Omonia (2008–2009), AEL Limassol (2009–2010)
- Louis Aniweta – Doxa Katokopias FC (2007–2008), Alki Larnaca FC (2008–2009), Nea Salamina (2009–2010), APOP Kinyras Peyias FC (2010–2011)
- Edwin Ouon – Aris Limassol FC (2008), AEL Limassol (2008–2014), Ermis Aradippou (2014), Apollon Limassol (2015)

== São Tomé and Príncipe ==
- Luís Leal – APOEL FC (2015)

== Scotland ==
- Ian Alexander – Pezoporikos Larnaca (1985–1986)
- Mark Burchill – Enosis Neon Paralimni FC (2010–2012)
- Mark Fotheringham – Anorthosis Famagusta FC (2010–2011)
- David Hannah – AEL Limassol (2002–2003)
- Kevin Holt – Pafos FC (2018–2019), Ermis Aradippou (2020–2021)
- Iain Jardine – Anorthosis Famagusta FC (1984–1985)
- David Kenny – Apollon Limassol (1982–1987, 1991–1993), APOEL FC (1987–1988), APOP Paphos (1990–1991)
- Scott McGarvey – Aris Limassol FC (1992–1993)
- Jamie McKenzie – Aris Limassol FC (2009)
- Ronald McQuilter – APOP Paphos (1992–1993)
- Jim McSherry – Pezoporikos Larnaca (1983–1984)
- Stuart Millar – Evagoras Paphos (1992–1993)
- Alastair Reynolds – Apollon Limassol (2013–2015, 2016–2017), Ayia Napa FC (2015–2016), Nea Salamina (2017–2018, 2019–2020), Karmiotissa FC (2020–2021), AEL Limassol (2021–)
- Paul Ritchie – AC Omonia (2006–2007)

== Senegal ==
- Ismail Ba – AEK Larnaca FC (2005–2006), AC Omonia (2006–2008), AEP Paphos FC (2008–2010)
- Alioune Badará – Alki Oroklini (2019)
- Mohamed Coly – APOP Kinyras Peyias FC (2010–2011)
- Bouna Coundoul – Enosis Neon Paralimni FC (2012–2013), Ethnikos Achna FC (2013–2015)
- Ousmane Cissokho – Apollon Limassol (2011–2012)
- Modou Diagne – Olympiakos Nicosia (2021–)
- Issaga Diallo – Anagennisi Dherynia (2016–2017)
- Alpha Dionkou – AEK Larnaca FC (2023–2024) AC Omonia (2024–)
- Cheikh Gadiaga – Alki Larnaca FC (2007–2008), AEL Limassol (2008–2009), Ermis Aradippou (2009–2012)
- Louis Gomis – Apollon Limassol (2004)
- Jackson Mendy – AC Omonia (2015)
- Omar Traoré – AEK Larnaca FC (2004–2006)
- Ladji Keita – Atromitos Yeroskipou (2008), AEP Paphos FC (2009)
- Salif Keita – APEP FC (2009)
- Moussa Koita – Olympiakos Nicosia (2011–2012)
- Aboubacar Loucoubar – Aris Limassol (2024–2025) Olympiakos Nicosia (2025) APOEL Nicosia (2025–)
- Abdoulaye Niang – Ethnikos Achna (2009)
- Mame Niang – AEL Limassol (2015)
- Bara Mamadou Ndiaye – Doxa Katokopias FC (2016)
- Seyni N'Diaye – AEL Limassol (2003–2004, 2007–2008), AC Omonia (2005–2006), Nea Salamina (2006–2007)
- Lamine Sakho – Alki Larnaca FC (2008)
- Massamba Sambou – AEL Limassol (2015–2016)
- Mamadou Kaly Sène – AC Omonia (2020–2021)
- Gora Tall – APOP Kinyras Peyias FC (2009–2011), AEP Paphos FC (2012–2013), Ethnikos Achna FC (2013–2015)

== Serbia ==
- Marko Adamović – Karmiotissa FC (2016–2017), AEL Limassol (2018–2021), Doxa Katokopias FC (2021–)
- Miloš Adamović – Ethnikos Achna FC (2006–2007), AEK Larnaca FC (2009)
- Mirko Aleksić – Ethnikos Achna FC (2004–2005)
- Enver Alivodić – Enosis Neon Paralimni FC (2011–2012)
- Marko Andić – Anorthosis Famagusta FC (2011–2015), Nea Salamina (2015–2016)
- Miloš Antić – Enosis Neon Paralimni FC (2015)
- Goran Antonić – Nea Salamina (2016–2017)
- Milan Belić – APOP Kinyras Peyias FC (2005–2006), Ethnikos Achna FC (2006–2007, 2009–2010), Anorthosis Famagusta FC (2007–2008), AEP Paphos FC (2008), AEK Larnaca FC (2009), Anagennisi Dherynia (2012)
- Aleksandar Čanović – Ermis Aradippou (2010–2011)
- Nemanja Čorović – AEL Limassol (2005–2007, 2008), APOEL FC (2007–2008)
- Uroš Ćosić – PAEEK FC (2021–)
- Slaviša Čula – Enosis Neon Paralimni FC (1998–2000), Olympiakos Nicosia (2000–2001)
- Stefan Čupić – Olympiakos Nicosia (2021–)
- Milenko Đedović – Olympiakos Nicosia (2001–2003)
- Miloš Deletić – Anorthosis Famagusta FC (2021–)
- Đorđe Denić – Apollon Limassol (2020–2021)
- Petar Đenić – Olympiakos Nicosia (2006–2008), Alki Larnaca FC (2008–2009)
- Dušan Đokić – AC Omonia (2009)
- Goran Đorđević – AEK Larnaca FC (1999–2000)
- Saša Drakulić – AEK Larnaca FC (2004–2005)
- Ivan Đurović – APOP Kinyras Peyias FC (2005–2006)
- Ivica Francisković – AEK Larnaca FC (2007)
- Nemanja Glavčić – AEL Limassol (2025–)
- Siniša Gogić – APOEL FC (1989–1992)
- Mirza Golubica – Aris Limassol FC (2000–2001)
- Goran Grkinić – Ethnikos Achna FC (2006–2008)
- Semir Hadžibulić – Doxa Katokopias FC (2013)
- Dejan Ilić – AEK Larnaca FC (2008)
- Dragan Isailović – AEK Larnaca FC (2003–2005), Ethnikos Achna FC (2006), Alki Larnaca FC (2008)
- Milan Jevtović – APOEL FC (2020)
- Aleksandar Jovanović – Apollon Limassol (2020–)
- Branislav Jovanović – Ethnikos Achna FC (2006–2008)
- Ivan Jovanović – AEP Paphos FC (2010)
- Saša Jovanović – Anorthosis Famagusta FC (1996–1997), AEP Paphos FC (1997–1998), 2002–2005, 2008–2009), AEL Limassol (1998–1999, 2006–2007), APOEL FC (2005–2006)
- Siniša Jovanović – Nea Salamina (2000–2001), Ethnikos Assia (2001–2002)
- Vukašin Jovanović – Apollon Limassol (2021–)
- Gojko Kacar – Anorthosis Famagusta FC (2018–2019)
- Andrija Kaluđerović – AEL Limassol (2014)
- Ljubiša Kekić – Alki Larnaca FC (2001–2002), AC Omonia (2002–2003, 2004–2005), Ethnikos Achna FC (2003–2004)
- Boban Kitanov – AEL Limassol (1993–1996), AC Omonia (1996–1999), AEK Larnaca FC (2000–2002), Ethnikos Assia (2001), Nea Salamina (2002–2003)
- Miloje Kljajević – AEK Larnaca FC (2001–2002)
- Aleksandar Kocić – Ethnikos Achna FC (2001–2006)
- Miloš Kolaković – Nea Salamina (2007)
- Goran Kopunović – AEK Larnaca FC (1996–1997)
- Bojan Kovačević – Doxa Katokopias FC (2021–)
- Slobodan Krčmarević – Apollon Limassol (1993–1996), Enosis Neon Paralimni FC (1996–1997), Anorthosis Famagusta FC (1997–1998, 2000–2001)
- Radovan Krivokapić – Enosis Neon Paralimni FC (2009–2012, 2013)
- Miloš Krstić – Nea Salamina (2014)
- Radovan Krstović – Enosis Neon Paralimni FC (1995–1996)
- Zoran Kuntić – AEK Larnaca FC (1996–1997)
- Predrag Lazić – Aris Limassol FC (2011–2012), Ayia Napa FC (2012–2013), Ethnikos Achna FC (2013–2014)
- Ognjen Lekić – Aris Limassol FC (2009–2010)
- Leo Lerinc – Ethnikos Achna FC (2005–2006)
- Dušan Ljubičić – APOEL FC (1994–1995)
- Marko Ljubinković – Anorthosis Famagusta FC (2011)
- Andrija Majdevac – AEL Limassol (2020–2021, 2021–), Ethnikos Achna FC (2021)
- Darko Marić – Anagennisi Dherynia (2003–2004)
- Marjan Marković – Alki Larnaca FC (2013)
- Saša Marković – Apollon Limassol (2018–)
- Saša Marjanović – Nea Salamina (2019–2020)
- Zoran Mašić – Apollon Limassol (1999–2000), Ethnikos Achna FC (2000–2001)
- Uroš Matić – APOEL FC (2019–2020)
- Slobodan Mazić – Digenis Morphou (2004–2005)
- Slobodan Medojević – AEL Limassol (2019–)
- Nemanja Miletić – Olympiakos Nicosia (2020–2021)
- Arsen Mihajlović – Anorthosis Famagusta FC (1996–1997, 2000–2002), APOP Paphos (1997–1998), Ethnikos Assia (1999–2000)
- Vesko Mihajlović – APOEL FC (1994), Enosis Neon Paralimni FC (1995), Olympiakos Nicosia (1996), Anorthosis Famagusta FC (1997–1999), AC Omonia (1999–2005)
- Nemanja Mijailović – Doxa Katokopias FC (2008)
- Dejan Miljković – Alki Larnaca FC (2001–2003)
- Mladen Milinkovic – Omonia Aradippou (1993–1994)
- Zoran Milinković – Anorthosis Famagusta FC (1999–2001), Doxa Katokopias FC (2001–2002)
- Ivan Milosavljević – AEL Limassol (2025–)
- Miroslav Milošević – Alki Larnaca FC (2004–2005, 2007)
- Zoran Milošević – AEK Larnaca FC (2004)
- Ivica Milutinović – Ethnikos Achna FC (2010–2012)
- Nenad Mirosavljević – APOEL FC (2008–2011), Olympiakos Nicosia (2011–2012)
- Dejan Mitrović – Anorthosis Famagusta FC (2002–2003), Anagennisi Dherynia (2003–2004)
- Nebojša Mladenović – APOP Paphos (1996–1997), Apollon Limassol (1997–1999), Doxa Katokopias FC (2000–2001), Ethnikos Assia (2001–2002), Ethnikos Achna FC (2002–2003), Anagennisi Dherynia (2004)
- Ivica Momčilović – AEL Limassol (1993–1995)
- Miljan Mrdaković – Apollon Limassol (2009–2011), Ethnikos Achna FC (2010), AEK Larnaca FC (2011–2012), Enosis Neon Paralimni FC (2013)
- Dragoslav Musić – Ethnikos Achna FC (1992–2002), APOEL FC (2003), AEK Larnaca FC (2003–2004)
- Zoran Novaković – Digenis Morphou (2005–2006)
- Predrag Ocokoljić – AEL Limassol (2007–2008), Anorthosis Famagusta FC (2008–2010), Ethnikos Achna FC (2010–2011)
- Stefan Panić – Pafos FC (2021–)
- Radovan Pankov – AEK Larnaca FC (2017–2018)
- Aleksandar Pantić – AC Omonia (2008–2009), Alki Larnaca FC (2010–2011)
- Aleksandar Pantić – Doxa Katokopias FC (2020), AEL Limassol (2021)
- Marko Pavićević – Ethnikos Achna FC (2011)
- Andrija Pavlović – APOEL FC (2019–2020)
- Miloš Pavlović – Doxa Katokopias FC (2013–2014)
- Nino Pekarić – Nea Salamina (2011–2012)
- Vladimir Petković – Olympiakos Nicosia (2004–2005)
- Goran Petkovski – Olympiakos Nicosia (1998–2000), AEK Larnaca FC (2000–2002), Enosis Neon Paralimni FC (2002–2003), APOEL FC (2003–2004)
- Ivan Petrović – Ethnikos Achna FC (2008–2011)
- Josip Projić – Ethnikos Achna FC (2020–2021)
- Pavle Popara – Enosis Neon Paralimni FC (2007–2008)
- Petar Puača – AEK Larnaca FC (2001–2002)
- Sava Radosavljev – Olympiakos Nicosia (2001–2002)
- Dragan Radosavljević – Aris Limassol FC (2011–2012)
- Saša Raca – Ethnikos Achna FC (2003–2004), APOEL FC (2004–2005)
- Nenad Rajić – Alki Larnaca FC (2010–2012)
- Luka Ratković – Anagennisi Dherynia (2016–2017)
- Dejan Rusmir – Olympiakos Nicosia (2012)
- Svetozar Šapurić – APOEL FC (1989–1993, 1995–1996), Anorthosis Famagusta FC (1993–1995)
- Milan Savić – Anorthosis Famagusta FC (2016), Ethnikos Achna FC (2020–2021)
- Vujadin Savić – APOEL FC (2019–)
- Marko Šćepović – AC Omonia (2021–)
- Slađan Šcepović – Apollon Limassol (1992–1996)
- Stefan Šćepović – AC Omonia (2021–)
- Milovan Sikimić – Apollon Limassol (2011)
- Dragan Simović – Olympiakos Nicosia (2006)
- Nebojša Skopljak – Ayia Napa FC (2015–2016), AEZ Zakakiou (2016–2017)
- Dalibor Škorić – APOEL FC (2000–2001)
- Vuk Sotirović – Nea Salamina (2013)
- Slađan Spasić – Olympiakos Nicosia (2007)
- Aleksandar Stefanović – Alki Larnaca FC (2004–2005)
- Milan Stepanov – AC Omonia (2014)
- Dušan Stevanović – AEL Limassol (2025–)
- Zoran Stjepanović – Alki Larnaca FC (2001–2003), AC Omonia (2003–2005), Ethnikos Achna FC (2005–2010)
- Uroš Stojanov – Ayia Napa FC (2015)
- Luka Stojanović – Apollon Limassol (2014–2016)
- Saša Stojanović – Aris Limassol FC (2009–2010), Ethnikos Achna FC (2011–2012)
- Milan Svojić – Enosis Neon Paralimni FC (2015–2016)
- Vladan Tomić – Aris Limassol FC (1994–1997), Anorthosis Famagusta FC (1997–2000), AEL Limassol (2000–2001)
- Nenad Tomović – AEK Larnaca (2021–)
- Nenad Trajković – Alki Larnaca FC (2002–2003)
- Božidar Urošević – AEP Paphos FC (2004–2005)
- Nebojša Vignjević – Enosis Neon Paralimni FC (1995–1997)
- Nebojša Vučićević – Evagoras FC (1993–1994)
- Nemanja Vučićević – Anorthosis Famagusta FC (2011–2012)
- Ljubiša Vukelja – Ethnikos Achna FC (2007)
- Dragan Žarković – Ermis Aradippou (2013–2015), Nea Salamina (2015–2016)
- Zlatko Zečević – APOP Kinyras Peyias FC (2010–2011)

== Sierra Leone ==
- Moustapha Bangura – Nea Salamina (2006–2008), AC Omonia (2008), AEP Paphos FC (2009), Apollon Limassol (2009–2012), AEK Larnaca FC (2012–2013), Aris Limassol FC (2015)
- Shaka Bangura – Anagennisi Dherynia (2012)
- Julius Conteh – Nea Salamina (2006)
- Jamil Kargbo – Nea Salamina (2005–2006)
- Brima Koroma – Anagennisi Dherynia (2011)
- Osman Koroma – Aris Limassol FC (2021–)
- Paul Kpaka – Enosis Neon Paralimni FC (2010)
- Sahr Lahai – Ethnikos Achna FC (2008–2010)
- Sheriff Suma – Ermis Aradippou (2009)
- Julius Wobay – Onisilos Sotira (2003–2004), Nea Salamina (2004–2006), Aris Limassol FC (2010)

== Slovakia ==
- Pavol Bajza – Olympiakos Nicosia (2019–2020)
- Balázs Borbély – AEL Limassol (2010)
- Mário Breška – Enosis Neon Paralimni FC (2009), APOEL FC (2009–2010)
- Kamil Čontofalský – AEL Limassol (2010)
- Michal Ďuriš – Anorthosis Famagusta FC (2018–2020), AC Omonia (2020–)
- Marek Fabula – ENTHOI Lakatamia FC (2005–2006)
- Boris Godál – AEL Limassol (2019–2020)
- Vladimir Helbich – AEP Paphos FC (2004–2005)
- Peter Hodulík – AEK Larnaca FC (2006–2008)
- Zsolt Hornyák – AEP Paphos FC (2004–2005)
- Tomáš Hubočan – AC Omonia (2019–)
- Pavel Kamesch – Enosis Neon Paralimni FC (2001–2005)
- Marián Kello – Aris Limassol FC (2015)
- Maroš Klimpl – Aris Limassol FC (2011–2012)
- Adam Kováč – Olympiakos Nicosia (2021–)
- Matúš Kozáčik – Anorthosis Famagusta FC (2010–2012)
- Jozef Kožlej – Olympiakos Nicosia (2000–2002), AC Omonia (2003–2006), Anorthosis Famagusta FC (2006)
- Stefan Kysela – AEK Larnaca FC (1995–1996)
- Pavol Masaryk – AEL Limassol (2010)
- Róbert Mazáň – AEL Limassol (2021–)
- Tibor Micinec – AC Omonia (1989–1991)
- Martin Miscik – ENTHOI Lakatamia FC (2005–2006)
- Ján Mucha – Atromitos Yeroskipou (2008–2009)
- Adam Nemec – Pafos FC (2018–2020)
- Tomáš Oravec – Enosis Neon Paralimni FC (2012–2013)
- Pavol Penksa – Anagennisi Dherynia (2011–2012)
- Andrej Pernecký – AEL Limassol (2010)
- Branislav Rzeszoto – APOEL FC (2004–2005)
- Ivan Schranz – AEL Limassol (2019)
- Miroslav Seman – Nea Salamina (2004–2006)
- Simeon Stevica – APOP Kinyras Peyias FC (2005)
- Július Szöke – Aris Limassol (2022–2024) AEL Limassol (2025–)
- Dušan Tittel – AC Omonia (1999–2000)
- Ivan Trabalík – Aris Limassol FC (2007–2008)
- Martin Urban – Enosis Neon Paralimni FC (2002–2005)
- Stanislav Velický – AEP Paphos FC (2010)
- Robert Veselovsky – Nea Salamina (2016–2021)

== Slovenia ==
- Milan Anđelković – Ethnikos Achna FC (2014)
- Amir Agič – Ethnikos Achna FC (2005–2006)
- Kenan Bajrić – Pafos FC (2021–)
- Gregor Balažic – Enosis Neon Paralimni FC (2020–2021)
- Jure Balkovec – AC Omonia (2026–)
- Marko Barun – Apollon Limassol (2004–2009), Ermis Aradippou (2009–2011), Aris Limassol FC (2012)
- Vid Belec – APOEL FC (2019–2020)
- Roman Bezjak – APOEL FC (2019–2020)
- Spasoje Bulajič – AEL Limassol (2005–2007)
- Miran Burgič – Ethnikos Achna FC (2014)
- Marjan Dominko – AEK Larnaca FC (2003–2004)
- Marinko Galič – Apollon Limassol (2004–2005)
- Saša Gajser – Olympiakos Nicosia (2002–2003)
- Miha Golob – AEL Limassol (2005–2007), Aris Limassol FC (2007–2008)
- Dejan Grabič – APOP Kinyras Peyias FC (2009–2010)
- Branko Ilič – Anorthosis Famagusta FC (2012–2013)
- Patrik Ipavec – Enosis Neon Paralimni FC (2005–2006), Ethnikos Achna FC (2006–2008)
- Erik Janža – Pafos FC (2017–2018)
- Jernej Javornik – AEL Limassol (2005–2006)
- Alfred Jermaniš – APOEL FC (1996–1997)
- Amer Jukan – Enosis Neon Paralimni FC (2005–2006)
- Bekim Kapič – Enosis Neon Paralimni FC (2005–2009)
- Amir Karič – AEL Limassol (2005), Anorthosis Famagusta FC (2006)
- Andraž Kirm – AC Omonia (2014–2016)
- Marko Kmetec – Ethnikos Achna FC (2004–2007)
- Jan Koprivec – Anorthosis Famagusta FC (2015–2017), Pafos FC (2017–2018)
- Dejan Krljanović – Enosis Neon Paralimni FC (2012)
- Dino Lalić – AEK Larnaca FC (2003–2004)
- Mitja Lotrič – Pafos FC (2017)
- Anej Lovrečič – Ayia Napa FC (2015)
- Bojan Milić – Enosis Neon Paralimni FC (2005–2006)
- Dejan Milić – Nea Salamina (2011–2012)
- Željko Mitrakovič – Ethnikos Achna FC (2005)
- Milan Osterc – AEK Larnaca FC (2005)
- Janez Pate – Alki Larnaca FC (1996–1997)
- Luka Pavlin – Olympiakos Nicosia (2012)
- Miran Pavlin – Olympiakos Nicosia (2003–2004), APOEL FC (2004–2005)
- David Poljanec – Karmiotissa FC (2016–2017), Aris Limassol FC (2017), Nea Salamina (2017–2018)
- Denis Popović – Anorthosis Famagusta FC (2021–)
- Nejc Potokar – AEL Limassol (2014)
- Martin Pregelj – Enosis Neon Paralimni FC (2004–2005)
- Marko Pridigar – Ayia Napa FC (2015–2016)
- Aleš Puš – Ethnikos Achna FC (2007–2008)
- Mladen Rudonja – Apollon Limassol (2004), Anorthosis Famagusta FC (2005)
- Enes Rujović – Nea Salamina (2013)
- Simon Sešlar – AEL Limassol (2006)
- Marko Simeunovič – Olympiakos Nicosia (2002–2005), AEL Limassol (2005–2006)
- Mitja Širok – Pafos FC (2018–2020)
- Gregor Šmajd – Olympiakos Nicosia (2012)
- Luka Štor – Apollon Limassol (2021–)
- Andraž Struna – Anorthosis Famagusta FC (2018–2019)
- Admir Suhonjić – APOP Kinyras Peyias FC (2005–2006)
- Almir Tanjič – Enosis Neon Paralimni FC (2005–2008), AEP Paphos FC (2008–2010)
- Nikola Tolimir – Enosis Neon Paralimni FC (2013)
- Muamer Vugdalič – AEL Limassol (2005–2006)
- Zoran Zeljkovič – APOP Kinyras Peyias FC (2009–2010)
- Luka Žinko – APOP Kinyras Peyias FC (2009–2010), Alki Larnaca FC (2011)
- Saša Živec – AC Omonia (2018–2019)
- Anton Žlogar – Enosis Neon Paralimni FC (2004–2006), Anorthosis Famagusta FC (2006–2008), AC Omonia (2008–2010), Alki Larnaca FC (2010–2011)

== South Africa ==
- Ryan Botha – Enosis Neon Paralimni FC (2007)
- Delron Buckley – Anorthosis Famagusta FC (2009–2010)
- Roger Da Costa – Aris Limassol FC (2015)
- Thapelo Maseko – AEL Limassol (2026–)
- Mihlali Mayambela – Aris Limassol FC (2022–2026) AC Omonia (2026–)
- MacDonald Mukansi – Enosis Neon Paralimni FC (2004)
- Nasief Morris – Apollon Limassol (2010–2011)
- Dino Ndlovu – Anorthosis Famagusta FC (2015–2016)
- Ricardo Nunes – Aris Limassol FC (2009)
- Luther Singh – AEL Limassol (2024–)
- Ryan Wuest – APEP FC (2005–2006)

== Soviet Union ==
- Oleg Blokhin – Aris Limassol FC (1989–1990)
- Vladimir Kosarev – Omonia Aradippou (1991–1992)

== Spain ==
- Acorán – AEK Larnaca FC (2016–)
- Alberto Aguilar – Anorthosis Famagusta FC (2016–2017)
- Diego Aguirre – Apollon Limassol (2019–2021)
- Agus – Nea Salamina (2019)
- Víctor Álvarez – Pafos FC (2021–)
- Alain Álvarez – Othellos Athienou F.C. (2014–2015), Aris Limassol FC (2016–2017)
- Iván Amaya – Apollon Limassol (2012)
- Pablo Amo – Olympiakos Nicosia (2011)
- Igor Angulo – Enosis Neon Paralimni FC (2013–2014)
- Dani Aquino – AEK Larnaca FC (2019)
- Rubén Arroyo – Ethnikos Achna FC (2013)
- Mikel Arruabarrena – AEL Limassol (2016–2018)
- Alfonso Artabe – Ermis Aradippou (2016–2017, 2018), Doxa Katokopias FC (2019–2020)
- Jonathan Aspas – AEP Paphos FC (2011), Alki Larnaca FC (2011–2013)
- Iñaki Astiz – APOEL FC (2015–2017)
- Pedro Baquero – Doxa Katokopias FC (2013–2014)
- David Barral – APOEL FC (2017)
- Miguel Bedoya – Apollon Limassol (2016–2017)
- Dani Benitez – AEL Limassol (2017–2019)
- Iván Benítez – Doxa Katokopias FC (2011), Nea Salamina (2011–2013)
- Bidari – Ethnikos Achna FC (2013–2014)
- Aritz Borda – APOEL FC (2012–2014)
- Francisco Borrego – Doxa Katokopias FC (2010–2011)
- Iago Bouzón – AC Omonia (2010–2012)
- Eneko Bóveda – Olympiakos Nicosia (2021–)
- Álvaro Brachi – Anorthosis Famagusta FC (2010–2011)
- Braulio – Doxa Katokopias FC (2017)
- David Cabarcos – Alki Larnaca FC (2007)
- Nacho Cases – AEK Larnaca FC (2017–2020)
- Airam Cabrera – Anorthosis Famagusta FC (2016–2017)
- Iñigo Calderón – Anorthosis Famagusta FC (2016–2017)
- Javi Cantero – Enosis Neon Paralimni FC (2013–2014)
- Toni Calvo – Anorthosis Famagusta FC (2012–2016)
- David Català – AEK Larnaca FC (2012–2019)
- José Catalá – Apollon Limassol (2013)
- Chando – AEK Larnaca FC (2013)
- Jordi Codina – APOEL FC (2015), Pafos FC (2016)
- Simón Colina – Nea Salamina (2015–2016)
- Adrián Colunga – Anorthosis Famagusta FC (2016–2017)
- Biel Company – Pafos FC (2017–2018)
- Ferran Corominas – Doxa Katokopias FC (2017)
- Carles Coto – Anorthosis Famagusta FC (2010–2011), Doxa Katokopias FC (2016), Ermis Aradippou (2017)
- Deivid Rodríguez – Nea Salamina (2020)
- Didac Devesa – Ermis Aradippou (2018–2019)
- Toni Dovale – Nea Salamina (2018)
- Alain Eizmendi – AEL Limassol (2017)
- Borja Ekiza – AC Omonia (2017–2018), Enosis Neon Paralimni FC (2018)
- Juanan Entrena – AC Omonia (2018–2019)
- Ion Erice – Apollon Limassol (2010–2012)
- Miguel Escalona – AEK Larnaca FC (2014)
- Víctor Espasandín – AC Omonia (2010–2011)
- Javier Espinosa – AEK Larnaca FC (2021–)
- José Manuel Fernández – AEK Larnaca FC (2020–2021)
- Igor Gabilondo – AEK Larnaca FC (2012)
- Jose Pedrosa Galan – Aris Limassol FC (2015)
- Aritz López Garai – Doxa Katokopias FC (2015)
- Ángel García – AEK Larnaca FC (2021–)
- Gonzalo García – AEK Larnaca FC (2011–2012), Anorthosis Famagusta FC (2013–2015)
- Joaquín García – Ethnikos Achna FC (2015)
- Jonan García – Othellos Athienou F.C. (2015)
- Manu García – Aris Limassol FC (2021–)
- Nando García – AEK Larnaca FC (2020–2021)
- Javier Garrido – AEK Larnaca FC (2016–2017)
- Manolo Gaspar – Olympiakos Nicosia (2013)
- Jon Gaztañaga – AEL Limassol (2018–2020)
- Román Golobart – Nea Salamina (2018–2019), AEK Larnaca FC (2020), Doxa Katokopias FC (2021)
- Jordi Gómez – AC Omonia (2018–)
- Abraham González – AEK Larnaca FC (2020–)
- Fran González – Ermis Aradippou (2015–2016)
- Mikel González – AEK Larnaca FC (2018–)
- Marcos Gullón – Apollon Limassol (2013–2016)
- Chus Herrero – Anorthosis Famagusta FC (2016–2017)
- Cristian Hidalgo – Alki Larnaca FC (2012)
- José Higón – Doxa Katokopias FC (2014)
- José – AC Omonia (2013–2014)
- Rubén Jurado – AEL Limassol (2018–2020)
- Roberto Lago – APOEL FC (2016–2018)
- Jorge Larena – AEK Larnaca FC (2014–2019)
- Arnal Llibert – AEK Larnaca FC (2010), Doxa Katokopias FC (2011), Alki Larnaca FC (2011–2012), Ethnikos Achna FC (2013)
- Diego León – Nea Salamina (2011–2012, 2013–2015), Doxa Katokopias FC (2016)
- Dani López – Doxa Katokopias FC (2013–2016)
- Hugo López – Enosis Neon Paralimni FC (2013), Apollon Limassol (2014–2015)
- Isma López – AC Omonia (2018)
- Jordi López – Nea Salamina (2019–2020)
- Alberto Lora – AC Omonia (2018–2019)
- Iván Malón – Ermis Aradippou (2018–2019)
- Christian Manrique – AC Omonia (2018–2020), Olympiakos Nicosia (2020–)
- Albert Marrama – Nea Salamina (2011)
- Miguel Massana – AEK Larnaca FC (2014–2015)
- Héctor Martínez – AEK Larnaca FC (2020–2021)
- Mario Martínez – Olympiakos Nicosia (2012)
- Rubén Martínez – AEK Larnaca FC (2021–)
- Biel Medina – Anorthosis Famagusta FC (2010)
- Tomás Mejías – AC Omonia (2018–2019)
- Rubén Miño – AEK Larnaca FC (2016–2017)
- Cris Montes – AC Omonia (2018–2019), Nea Salamina (2020–2021)
- Ferrán Monzó – Doxa Katokopias FC (2014–2015)
- Luis Morán – AEK Larnaca FC (2012), Ermis Aradippou (2013–2015)
- José Naranjo – AEK Larnaca FC (2020–2021)
- Dennis Nieblas – Othellos Athienou F.C. (2014)
- Emilio Nsue – APOEL FC (2018–2019, 2020–2021), Apollon Limassol (2019–2020)
- Antonio Núñez – Apollon Limassol (2009–2012)
- Álvaro Ocaña – Doxa Katokopias FC (2014–2015)
- Edu Oriol – AEL Limassol (2014)
- Andrea Orlandi – Anorthosis Famagusta FC (2015–2016), APOEL FC (2016)
- Dani Pacheco – Aris Limassol FC (2021–)
- Juanma Ortiz – AEK Larnaca FC (2014–2017)
- Juan Pablo – AEK Larnaca FC (2017–2018)
- Miguel Palanca – Anorthosis Famagusta FC (2017–2018)
- Pedrito – Doxa Katokopias FC (2013–2014), Nea Salamina (2014–2016)
- Nauzet Pérez – APOEL FC (2017–2018)
- Fran Piera – Doxa Katokopias FC (2013–2014)
- Juan Pedro Pina – Doxa Katokopias FC (2013)
- Ángel Pindado – Nea Salamina (2012)
- Gorka Pintado – AEK Larnaca FC (2011–2014)
- Piti – AEL Limassol (2017)
- Carles Planas – AEK Larnaca FC (2019–2021)
- Jorge Prado – APEP FC (2008–2010)
- Rubén Rayos – Anorthosis Famagusta FC (2016–2020)
- Manuel Redondo – Doxa Katokopias FC (2015–2018)
- Manolo Reina – AEP Paphos FC (2012–2013)
- Sito Riera – Enosis Neon Paralimni FC (2018–2020), AEL Limassol (2020–)
- José Antonio Ríos – Anorthosis Famagusta FC (2016)
- Roberto – Apollon Limassol (2012–2014), AC Omonia (2014–2015)
- Rodri – Doxa Katokopias FC (2013–2014), AC Omonia (2014–2015)
- Joan Román – AEL Limassol (2018)
- Rubén Palazuelos – Ermis Aradippou (2014)
- Cristian Portilla – Ermis Aradippou (2015)
- Pulpo Romero – AEK Larnaca FC (2012–2013), AEL Limassol (2013–2015)
- Álex Rubio – AC Omonia (2014–2015)
- Jesús Rueda – APOEL FC (2017–2019)
- José Manuel Rueda – AC Omonia (2010–2011)
- Raúl Ruiz – AEK Larnaca FC (2019–2020)
- Mikel Saizar – AEK Larnaca FC (2015–2016)
- Emilio Sánchez – Doxa Katokopias FC (2017)
- Adrián Sardinero – AEL Limassol (2014–2016), Apollon Limassol (2016–2020)
- Albert Serrán – AEK Larnaca FC (2011–2013, 2015–2016), Anorthosis Famagusta FC (2014–2015), Doxa Katokopias FC (2016–2017)
- Lluís Sastre – AEK Larnaca FC (2019–2020)
- Antonio Soldevilla – Apollon Limassol (2006–2007)
- Carles Soria – AEK Larnaca FC (2017–2018)
- David Sousa – Nea Salamina (2012–2013)
- Pablo Suárez – Doxa Katokopias FC (2012–2014)
- Tete – AEK Larnaca FC (2015–2021)
- Joan Tomás – AEK Larnaca FC (2013–2019)
- Toni – Doxa Katokopias FC (2014)
- Toñito – AEK Larnaca FC (2009)
- Toño – AEK Larnaca FC (2014–2016, 2018–2021)
- Manuel Torres – AEL Limassol (2018–)
- Dani Tortolero – Doxa Katokopias FC (2014)
- Jorge Troiteiro – Doxa Katokopias FC (2012–2013)
- Joan Truyols – AEK Larnaca FC (2016–2021)
- José Antonio Villanueva – Ethnikos Achna FC (2010)
- Carmelo Yuste – APOP Kinyras Peyias FC (2010–2011)
- Héctor Yuste – Apollon Limassol (2017–2021), AC Omonia (2021–)

== Suriname ==
- Diego Biseswar – Apollon Limassol (2021)
- Gleofilo Vlijter – Doxa Katokopias (2023)
- Dion Malone – Karmiotissa (2022–)
- Jaden Montnor – Aris Limassol (2023–)

== Sweden ==
- John Alvbåge – AC Omonia (2018), Nea Salamina (2018–2019)
- Admir Bajrović – Olympiakos Nicosia (2025–)
- Junes Barny – Enosis Neon Paralimni FC (2021)
- Nahir Besara – Pafos FC (2019–2020)
- Björn Morgan Enqvist – Nea Salamina (2006–2007), APEP FC (2008–2009)
- Joakim Hallenberg – Enosis Neon Paralimni FC (2000–2001)
- Linus Hallenius – APOEL FC (2019–2020)
- Markus Holgersson – Anorthosis Famagusta FC (2014–2016)
- Valentino Lai – Apollon Limassol (2010)
- Daniel Larsson – Apollon Limassol (2020–2021)
- Richie Omorowa - Olympiakos Nicosia (2026–)
- Caspar Pauckstadt – Enosis Neon Paralimni FC (1987–1988)
- Dejan Pavlović – Anorthosis Famagusta FC (2000–2001)
- Fredrik Risp – Ethnikos Achna FC (2012–2013)
- Zakaria Sawo – Aris Limassol (2023–2025) AEL Limassol (2026–)
- Maic Sema – AEL Limassol (2015)
- Rasmus Sjöstedt – Aris Limassol FC (2017)
- Håkan Svensson – Enosis Neon Paralimni FC (2004–2005)
- Muamer Tanković – Pafos FC (2022–2025) AC Omonia (2025–)
- Jörgen Wålemark – Enosis Neon Paralimni FC (2000–2001), AEL Limassol (2001–2003)
- Christer Youssef – Aris Limassol FC (2014, 2016–2018)

== Switzerland ==
- Admir Bilibani – Nea Salamina (2007)
- Oliver Buff – Anorthosis Famagusta FC (2019)
- Clirim Kryeziu – APEP FC (2009–2010)
- Slaviša Dugić – Aris Limassol FC (2009–2010), Ethnikos Achna FC (2010–2011)
- Innocent Emeghara – Ermis Aradippou (2017–2018)
- Mickaël Facchinetti – APOEL FC (2019)
- Johnny Leoni – AC Omonia (2012–2013)
- Joël Mall – Pafos FC (2018–2019), Apollon Limassol (2019–2020), AEK Larnaca FC (2021), Olympiakos Nicosia (2021–)
- Dragan Mihajlović – APOEL FC (2019–2020)
- Vero Salatić – AC Omonia (2011–2012)
- Hélios Sessolo – Ethnikos Achna FC (2021)
- Gezim Shalaj – Enosis Neon Paralimni FC (2016)
- Henri Siqueira – Enosis Neon Paralimni FC (2007–2008)
- Fabian Stoller – Ethnikos Achna FC (2014–2015)
- Kiliann Witschi – APEP FC (2009–2010)

== Togo ==
- Jean-Paul Abalo – APOEL FC (2006)
- Jonathan Ayité – Olympiakos Nicosia (2019–2020)
- Hugues Ayivi – Pafos FC (2015–2016)
- Guillaume Brenner – Alki Larnaca FC (2010–2011)
- Henri Eninful – Doxa Katokopias FC (2015–2018)
- Serge Gakpé – Apollon Limassol (2019–2021)

== Trinidad and Tobago ==
- Daniel Carr – Apollon Limassol (2019)
- Nickel Orr – PAEEK FC (2021–)
- Ryan Telfer – Nea Salamina (2020)

== Tunisia ==
- Selim Benachour – APOEL FC (2012–2014)
- Tijani Belaid – APOEL FC (2011)
- Salema Kasdaoui – APEP FC (2008–2009)
- Sami Gtari – APEP FC (2008–2009)
- Ismail Sassi – Othellos Athienou F.C. (2014–2015), AEZ Zakakiou (2016), AEL Limassol (2017–2018), Karmiotissa FC (2020–2021), Doxa Katokopias FC (2021–)
- Mohamed Sassi – Othellos Athienou F.C. (2014), Karmiotissa FC (2020–2021)

== Ukraine ==
- Maksym Borovets – Enosis Neon Paralimni FC (2013)
- Vitalii Doroshenko – Doxa Katokopias FC (2013–2014)
- Artem Filimonov – Pafos FC (2017)
- Maksym Ilchysh – AEL Limassol (2013)
- Maksym Imerekov – Ermis Aradippou (2017–2018)
- Vitaliy Ivanko – AEK Larnaca FC (2013–2014)
- Ihor Khudobyak – Ethnikos Achna FC (2019–)
- Bohdan Kovalenko – Pafos FC (2017)
- Viktor Kovalenko – Aris Limassol (2025–2026) Olympiakos Nicosia (2026–)
- Orest Kuzyk – Pafos FC (2020–2021)
- Vitaliy Kvashuk – Aris Limassol FC (2021–)
- Hennadiy Lytovchenko – AEL Limassol (1995)
- Illya Markovskyy – Ethnikos Achna FC (2019–2020), Enosis Neon Paralimni FC (2020–2021)
- Yaroslav Martynyuk – Ermis Aradippou (2016–2019)
- Dmytro Mykhaylenko – APOP Kinyras Peyias FC (2007–2009)
- Andriy Novak – Ermis Aradippou (2017)
- Yevhen Pavlov – Doxa Katokopias FC (2018–2019)
- Artur Rudko – Pafos FC (2019–)
- Yevhen Selin – Anorthosis Famagusta FC (2019–2021)
- Yuriy Yakovenko – Anorthosis Famagusta FC (2014–2015)

== United States ==
- Louis Bennett – Anorthosis Famagusta FC (2016)
- Mix Diskerud – AC Omonia (2021–)
- Riley Grant – Enosis Neon Paralimni FC (2018)
- Mukwelle Akale – Pafos FC (2020–2021)
- Danny Williams – Pafos FC (2019–2020)

== Uruguay ==
- Michel Acosta – AEK Kouklia FC (2013–2014)
- Edgardo Adinolfi – Olympiakos Nicosia (2006–2007)
- Juan Ángel Albín – AC Omonia (2018)
- Diego Barboza – Enosis Neon Paralimni FC (2020–2021)
- Pablo Cáceres – AC Omonia (2009)
- Agustín Cedrés – Apollon Limassol (2017–2018)
- Fabrizio Cetraro – Alki Larnaca FC (2009)
- Fernando Fadeuille – Apollon Limassol (2004–2005)
- Damián Frascarelli – APOP Kinyras Peyias FC (2010–2011), AC Omonia (2011)
- Carlos García – Alki Larnaca FC (2008, 2009), APEP FC (2009–2010), Nea Salamina (2011–2012)
- Rodrigo Gómez – Ermis Aradippou (2011)
- Christian Latorre – Ermis Aradippou (2015–2016)
- Matías Pérez – AC Omonia (2015)
- Bruno Piano – APEP FC (2008–2009)
- Diego Poyet – Pafos FC (2017–2018)
- Nicolás Raimondi – Ermis Aradippou (2009)
- Ignacio Risso – Apollon Limassol (2007–2009)
- Julio Rodríguez – Alki Larnaca FC (2008)
- Omar Santana – Olympiakos Nicosia (2020–2021)
- Diego Silva – AEK Kouklia FC (2013)
- David Texeira – AEL Limassol (2018)
- Joaquín Varela – Pafos FC (2019–2020)
- Nico Varela – Enosis Neon Paralimni FC (2019–2020), Nea Salamina (2020–2021), PAEEK FC (2021–)

== Venezuela ==
- Rafael Acosta – Alki Oroklini (2018–2019), Olympiakos Nicosia (2019–2020)
- Rubén Arocha – Karmiotissa FC (2016–2017)
- Homero Calderón – Doxa Katokopias FC (2014–2015)
- César Castro – Olympiakos Nicosia (2011)
- Jonathan España – AEL Limassol (2014–2015)
- Jaime Moreno – AEL Limassol (2014)
- Fernando de Ornelas – Olympiakos Nicosia (2004–2005)
- Frank Feltscher – AEL Limassol (2015–2016)
- Héctor González – AEK Larnaca FC (2007–2009), Alki Larnaca FC (2010–2011), Ermis Aradippou (2011), Doxa Katokopias FC (2014–2015)
- Raúl González – Doxa Katokopias FC (2007–2008, 2014–2015), Enosis Neon Paralimni FC (2008–2010), Apollon Limassol (2010–2011), Anagennisi Dherynia (2011)
- Leopoldo Jiménez – Aris Limassol FC (2007)
- Miku – AC Omonia (2019–2020)
- Christian Novoa – Doxa Katokopias FC (2014–2015)
- Rafael Ponzo – Nea Salamina (2010), Ermis Aradippou (2010)
- Rafael Quiñónes – Alki Oroklini (2017–2019)
- José Manuel Rey – AEK Larnaca FC (2007–2008)
- Elias Romero – Doxa Katokopias FC (2014–2015)
- José Romo – Karmiotissa FC (2020–2021), AEK Larnaca FC (2021–)
- Rafael Romo – AEL Limassol (2016–2017), APOEL FC (2018–2019)
- Andrés Rouga – Alki Larnaca FC (2007–2009), AEL Limassol (2009–2010)
- Roberto Rosales – AEK Larnaca FC (2021–)
- Jeffrén Suárez – AEK Larnaca FC (2019)
- Luis Vallenilla – Nea Salamina (2007–2008)

== Wales ==
- Jack Evans – Pafos FC (2020)

== Yugoslavia ==
- Suad Beširević – Apollon Limassol (1990–1992), APEP FC (1993–1994), Aris Limassol FC (1994–1995), Omonia Aradippou (1995–1996)
- Vojislav Budimirović – Apollon Limassol (1996–1998)
- Dragiša Binić – APOEL FC (1993–1994)
- Milenko Kovačević – AEK Larnaca FC (1995–1997), Nea Salamina (1997–1998)

== Zambia ==
- Prosper Chiluya – Pafos FC (2017)
- Edward Kangwa – Olympiakos Nicosia (2005)
- William Njovu – Enosis Neon Paralimni FC (2013–2014)
- Moses Sichone – AEP Paphos FC (2009–2010)
- Justine Zulu – Enosis Neon Paralimni FC (2012)
- January Zyambo – Olympiakos Nicosia (2005)

== Zimbabwe ==
- Shingayi Kaondera – AEP Paphos FC (2002–2005), AEK Larnaca FC (2007), Nea Salamina (2008)
- Noel Kaseke – Enosis Neon Paralimni FC (2004–2007), AC Omonia (2007–2012), Alki Larnaca FC (2012)
- David Kutyauripo – APOP Kinyras Peyias FC (2005–2006)
- Edward Mashinya – Ethnikos Achna FC (2012–2013), Ermis Aradippou (2016–2017)
- Musawengosi Mguni – AC Omonia (2004–2008), Ayia Napa FC (2015)
- Thabani Moyo – Olympiakos Nicosia (2005–2006), Doxa Katokopias FC (2010), Anagennisi Dherynia (2011)
- Zenzo Moyo – AEP Paphos FC (2000–2004), Olympiakos Nicosia (2004)
- Kennedy Nagoli – Enosis Neon Paralimni FC (2002–2004), AEK Larnaca FC (2004–2006)
- Joel Lupahla – AEP Paphos FC (2000–2004)
- Agent Sawu – APOP Paphos (1991–1992)
- Obadiah Tarumbwa – Enosis Neon Paralimni FC (2009–2011)

== Notes ==
1. Capped for the Equatorial Guinea national football team
