= 2017–18 AC Omonia season =

AC Omonia
2017–18 season
- Chairman: Antonis Tzionis (Until 2 May 2018); Loris Kyriakou (From 3 May 2018)
- Head coach: Pambos Christodoulou (Until 5 December 2017); Ivaylo Petev (From 14 December 2017 to 21 March 2018); Jesper Fredberg (Caretaker, from 22 March 2018)
- Stadium: GSP Stadium
- Cypriot First Division: 6th
- Cypriot Cup: Second round
- Top goalscorer: League: Matt Derbyshire (23); All: Matt Derbyshire (25)
- Highest home attendance: 13,225 vs. APOEL (17 November 2017)
- Lowest home attendance: 800 vs. Apollon (13 May 2018)
- Average home league attendance: 5,680 (18 home matches)
Home colours	Away colours

The 2017–18 season is Omonia's 64th season in the Cypriot First Division and 69th year in existence as a football club.

The season covers the period from 1 July 2017 to 30 June 2018.

== Transfers ==
=== Transfers in ===
Date from	Position	Nationality	Name	From	Fee	Ref.
1 July 2017	LB	(Guinea-Bissau)	Mamadu Candé	Free Agent	Free	
1 July 2017	CM	(Brazil)	Kanu	Free Agent	Free	
1 July 2017	CB	(Cape Verde)	Kay	CSU Craiova	Free	
3 July 2017	CM	(Portugal)	Alex Soares	C.S. Marítimo	Free	
6 July 2017	RW	(Argentina)	Leandro González	Atlético Tucumán	Free	
10 July 2017	CF	(Portugal)	Rafael Lopes	G.D. Chaves	Free	
17 July 2017	GK	(Netherlands)	Piet Velthuizen	Hapoel Haifa	Free	
20 July 2017	CM	(Netherlands)	Hedwiges Maduro	Groningen	Free	
21 July 2017	CB	(Spain)	Borja Ekiza	Zirka	Free	
27 July 2017	RW	(Curaçao)	Jarchinio Antonia	Go Ahead Eagles	Free	
29 July 2017	CB	(Brazil)	William Ribeiro Soares	Hapoel Be'er Sheva	Free	
2 August 2017	CB	(Brazil)	Fabrício	F.C. Ashdod	Free	
7 September 2017	ST	(Belgium)	Jonathan Benteke	Free Agent	Free	
15 December 2017	GK	(Bulgaria)	Nikolay Mihaylov	Free Agent	Free	
15 January 2018	GK	(Sweden)	John Alvbåge	IFK Göteborg	Free	
19 January 2018	ST	(Russia)	Nikolai Kipiani	Ethnikos Achna	Free	

=== Loans in ===
Start date	Position	Nationality	Name	From	End date	Ref.
1 August 2017	RB	(Brazil)	Jaílson Araújo	Grêmio Anápolis	30 June 2018	
31 January 2018	RW	(Nigeria)	Theophilus Solomon	Rijeka	30 June 2018	

=== Transfers out ===
Date from	Position	Nationality	Name	To	Fee	Ref.
31 May 2017	CM	(Brazil)	Cleyton	Ümraniyespor	Released	(Note: Cleyton joined Ümraniyespor following his release.)
16 June 2017	ST	(Greece)	Dimos Chantzaras	Anagennisi Karditsa	Released	(Note: Dimos Chantzaras joined Anagennisi Karditsa following his release.)
13 July 2017	LB	(Greece)	Aristidis Soiledis	Kerkyra	Released	(Note: Aristidis Soiledis joined Kerkyra following his release.)
14 July 2017	CB	(Iceland)	Kári Árnason	Aberdeen	Free	
5 September 2017	CB	(Cyprus)	Pantelis Konomis	—N/a	Released	
18 December 2017	RW	(Argentina)	Leandro González	Quilmes	Released	(Note: Leandro González joined Quilmes following his release.)
18 December 2017	GK	(Netherlands)	Piet Velthuizen	—N/a	Released	
11 January 2018	CB	(Brazil)	Fabrício	Aktobe	Released	(Note: Fabrício joined Aktobe following his release.)
15 January 2018	ST	(Belgium)	Jonathan Benteke	Oldham Athletic	Released	(Note: Jonathan Benteke joined Oldham Athletic following his release.)
17 January 2018	CM	(Burkina Faso)	Blati Touré	AFC Eskilstuna	Released	(Note: Blati Touré joined AFC Eskilstuna following his release.)

=== Loans out ===
Start date	Position	Nationality	Name	To	End date	Ref.
24 July 2017	CM	(Cyprus)	Gerasimos Fylaktou	Pafos FC	31 May 2018	

== Squad statistics ==
No.	Pos.	Name	League		Cup		Total		Discipline	
No.	Pos.	Name	Apps	Goals	Apps	Goals	Apps	Goals	Yellow card	Red card
1	GK	(Cyprus) Constantinos Panagi	5	0	0	0	5	0	1	0
6	DF	(Brazil) William Soares	31	2	2	1	33	3	5	1
7	DF	(Cyprus) Marios Demetriou	15	0	0	0	15	0	4	0
8	MF	(Portugal) Alex Soares	30	1	2	0	32	1	7	0
9	FW	(Russia) Nikolai Kipiani	13	1	1	0	14	1	1	0
10	MF	(Brazil) Kanu	22	0	2	0	24	0	3	1
13	DF	(Brazil) Jaílson Araújo	30	1	2	0	32	0	4	0
14	MF	(Curaçao) Jarchinio Antonia	33	1	2	0	35	1	2	0
17	FW	(Nigeria) Theophilus Solomon	7	1	2	0	9	1	3	0
19	DF	(Cyprus) Andreas Panayiotou	5	0	1	0	6	0	0	0
21	FW	(Portugal) Rafael Lopes	25	7	2	0	27	7	4	0
23	MF	(Netherlands) Hedwiges Maduro	28	1	0	0	28	1	4	0
24	DF	(Guinea-Bissau) Mamadu Candé	23	3	2	0	25	3	10	0
25	GK	(Cyprus) Andreas Christodoulou	15	0	2	0	17	0	0	1
26	DF	(Greece) Loukas Vyntra	15	1	1	0	16	1	1	1
27	FW	(England) Matt Derbyshire	33	23	2	2	35	25	6	0
28	MF	(Cyprus) Renato Margaça	22	3	2	0	24	3	4	0
30	GK	(Sweden) John Alvbåge	1	0	0	0	1	0	0	0
32	DF	(Spain) Borja Ekiza	6	1	0	0	6	1	2	1
38	FW	(Cyprus) Giorgos Kakoullis	1	0	0	0	1	0	0	0
49	MF	(Cyprus) Fanos Katelaris	27	0	1	0	28	0	7	0
58	MF	(Cyprus) Stavros Christoforou	2	0	0	0	2	0	0	0
61	GK	(Cyprus) Alexandros Antoniou	1	0	0	0	1	0	0	0
65	FW	(Cyprus) Andreas Katsantonis	7	1	0	0	7	1	0	0
68	DF	(Cyprus) Andreas Fragkeskou	1	0	0	0	1	0	0	0
71	MF	(Netherlands) Nicandro Breeveld	16	0	1	0	17	0	7	0
72	MF	(Cyprus) Marinos Tzionis	2	0	0	0	2	0	0	0
73	DF	(Bulgaria) Hristian Foti	3	0	0	0	3	0	0	0
77	FW	(Cyprus) Demetris Christofi	31	6	1	0	32	6	5	0
88	GK	(Bulgaria) Nikolay Mihaylov	10	0	0	0	10	0	1	0
Players left but featured this season
5	DF	(Brazil) Fabrício	13	1	0	0	13	1	3	0
11	MF	(Argentina) Leandro González	11	2	0	0	11	2	3	0
22	GK	(Netherlands) Piet Velthuizen	9	0	0	0	9	0	0	0
15	FW	(Belgium) Jonathan Benteke	3	0	0	0	3	0	0	0
29	MF	(Burkina Faso) Stephane Aziz Ki	4	0	0	0	4	0	0	0

Statistics accurate as of 13 May 2018.

=== Clean sheets ===
Includes all competitive matches.

Correct as of matches played on 13 May 2018

No.	Player	Cypriot First Division	Cypriot Cup	TOTAL
1	(Cyprus) Andreas Christodoulou	4	0	4
2	(Bulgaria) Nikolay Mihaylov	2	0	2
3	(Netherlands) Piet Velthuizen	1	0	1

== Preseason ==
=== Friendlies ===
22 July 2017	Omonia	0–2	Sigma Olomouc	Opalenica, Poland
17:00 EEST		Report		Stadium: Stadion Miejski

24 July 2017	Omonia	1–0	Hapoel Tel Aviv F.C.	Opalenica, Poland
17:00 EEST	Lopes 2'	Report		Stadium: Stadion Miejski

27 July 2017	Omonia	2–2	Lech Poznań	Opalenica, Poland
	Derbyshire 42'; Lopes 77'	Report		Stadium: Stadion Miejski

31 July 2017	Omonia	6–0	Zagłębie Lubin	Opalenica, Poland
15:00 EEST	Derbyshire 13', 29', 45'; Lopes 48'; Touré 66'; Katsantonis 71'	Report		Stadium: Stadion Miejski

5 August 2017	Omonia	3–0	Olympiakos	Nicosia
17:00 EEST	Derbyshire 51', 54'; Katsantonis 90'	Report		Stadium: GSP Stadium

8 August 2017	Aris	1–1	Omonia	Limassol
	Shkurti 86'	Report	Breeveld 48'	Stadium: Tsirio Stadium

13 August 2017	Nea Salamina	3–4	Omonia	Larnaca
	Brígido 46'; Sangoy 77'; Makriev 84' (pen.)	Report	González 20'; Christofi 32' (pen.), 90'; Derbyshire 81'	Stadium: Ammochostos Stadium

20 August 2017	Omonia	1–1	Ermis	Nicosia
	González 72'	Report	Tsoumou 30'	Stadium: GSP Stadium; Referee: Chrisovalantis Theouli

27 August 2017	OFI Crete	1–1	Omonia	Heraklion, Greece
	Chanti 6'	Report	Maduro 34'	Stadium: Theodoros Vardinogiannis Stadium

1 September 2017	Karmiotissa	1–4	Omonia	Pano Polemidia, Limassol
	Mguni 10'	Report	Breeveld 45'; Klark 53'; Katsantonis 69'; Kakoullis 81'	Stadium: Pano Polemidia Municipal Stadium

== Competitions ==
=== Cypriot First Division ===
==== Regular season ====
===== League table =====
Pos	Team	Pld	W	D	L	GF	GA	GD	Pts	Qualification or relegation
4	AEK Larnaca	26	16	5	5	57	24	+33	53	Qualification for the Championship round
5	AEL Limassol	26	14	6	6	35	17	+18	48	Qualification for the Championship round
6	Omonia	26	13	5	8	51	38	+13	44	Qualification for the Championship round
7	Doxa Katokopias	26	10	4	12	35	40	−5	34	Qualification for the Relegation round
8	Ermis Aradippou	26	9	3	14	35	49	−14	30	Qualification for the Relegation round

Source: CFA (in Greek)
Rules for classification: 1) Points; 2) Head-to-head points; 3) Head-to-head goal difference; 4) Head-to-head goals scored; 5) Head-to-head away goals scored (only if two teams); 6) Goal difference; 7) Goals scored; 8) Play-off (only if deciding championship round, relegation round or relegation).

===== Results summary =====
Overall								Home						Away					
Pld	W	D	L	GF	GA	GD	Pts	W	D	L	GF	GA	GD	W	D	L	GF	GA	GD
26	13	5	8	51	38	+13	44	7	3	3	28	15	+13	6	2	5	23	23	0

Last updated: 25 February 2018.
Source: CFA

===== Results by matchday =====
Matchday	1	2	3	4	5	6	7	8	9	10	11	12	13	14	15	16	17	18	19	20	21	22	23	24	25	26
Ground	H	A	H	A	H	H	A	H	A	H	A	H	A	A	H	A	H	A	A	H	A	H	A	H	A	H
Result	P	P	W	L	D	D	L	W	W	D	D	L	W	L	L	D	W	W	W	W	W	W	W	W	L	L
Position	11	12	8	11	3	7	9	6	4	6	5	7	7	7	8	8	7	7	6	6	6	6	6	6	6	6

Updated to match(es) played on 25 February 2018. Source: CFA
A = Away; H = Home; W = Win; D = Draw; L = Loss; P = Postponed

===== Matches =====
10 September 2017 3	Omonia	2–1	Ethnikos	Nicosia
19:00 EEST	Derbyshire 25', 82'; Lopes (yellow card) 62'; Demetriou (yellow card) 73'	Report	Pincelli (yellow card) 19'; Bogatinov (yellow card) 24'; Kipiani 69'; Stoychev (yellow card) 90+1' (yellow-red card) 90+5'	Stadium: GSP Stadium; Attendance: 11,992; Referee: Avraam Tsoukkas

16 September 2017 4	Pafos FC	2–1	Omonia	Paphos
19:00 EEST	Horić (yellow card) 6'; Camará 60'; Brüls (yellow card) 67'; Janža (yellow card) 72' (goal) 77'; Kovalenko (yellow card) 84'	Report	Demetriou (yellow card) 40'; A. Soares (yellow card) 56'; Derbyshire 71'; William (yellow card) 81'	Stadium: Stelios Kyriakides; Attendance: 3,500; Referee: Kostas Psevdiotis

20 September 2017 1	Omonia	5–2	AEK Larnaca	Nicosia
19:00 EEST	Margaça 5'; Derbyshire 11'; Mojsov 23' (o.g.); A. Soares 31'; Katelaris (yellow card) 42'; Christofi 51'; Panagi (yellow card) 52'; Leandro (yellow card) 90+1'	Report	Larena 19'; Mojsov 88'	Stadium: GSP Stadium; Attendance: 1,098; Referee: Leontios Trattou

23 September 2017 5	Omonia	2–2	Alki Oroklini	Nicosia
18:00 EEST	Christofi 37' (yellow card) 62'; Fabrício 86' (pen.); Jaílson (yellow card) 90+1'	Report	Fabrício 30', 44' (yellow card) 72'; Pierazzi (yellow card) 69'	Stadium: GSP Stadium; Attendance: 8,288; Referee: Giorgos Nikolaou

30 September 2017 6	Omonia	1–1	Olympiakos	Nicosia
19:00 EEST	González 51' (yellow card) 80'; Fabrício (yellow card) 81'	Report	Antoniou (yellow card) 40'; Kapartis 90+4' (yellow card) 90+4'	Stadium: GSP Stadium; Attendance: 7,262; Referee: Demetris Masias

15 October 2017 7	Ermis	2–1	Omonia	Larnaca
18:00 EEST	Zaharia (yellow card) 12'; Emeghara 14', 64'; Pacheco (yellow card) 41'; Frimpong (yellow card) 71'; China (yellow card) 90+6'	Report	Candé (yellow card) 41'; Maduro 41'; Fabrício (yellow card) 81'; Katelaris (yellow card) 88'; Christofi (yellow card) 90+6'	Stadium: GSZ Stadium; Attendance: 1,500; Referee: Christos Nikolaides

21 October 2017 8	Omonia	1–0	AEL Limassol	Nicosia
18:00 EEST	A. Soares (yellow card) 16'; Leandro 74' (yellow card) 90+3'	Report	Irhene (yellow card) 8'; Wheeler (yellow card) 84'; Tiago (yellow card) 87'; Avraam (yellow card) 90+5'	Stadium: GSP Stadium; Attendance: 6,581; Referee: Vasilis Demetriou

24 October 2017 9	Nea Salamina	1–3	Omonia	Larnaca
20:00 EEST	Poljanec (yellow card) 33' (goal) 35'; Voskanyan (yellow card) 48'; Roque (yellow card) 53'; Manoyan (yellow card) 78'; Karo (yellow card) 86'; Veselovsky (yellow card) 83'	Report	Margaça 39'; Derbyshire 84' (pen.); Lopes 90'	Stadium: Ammochostos Stadium; Attendance: 2,500; Referee: Timotheos Christofi

28 October 2017 10	Omonia	1–1	Anorthosis	Nicosia
18:00 EEST	Lopes 56'; Candé (yellow card) 79'; Kanu (yellow card) 81'	Report	Camara (yellow card) 48'; Carlitos (yellow card) 52'; Douglão 90+6'	Stadium: GSP Stadium; Attendance: 9,777; Referee: Giorgos Nikolaou

4 November 2017 11	Aris	2–2	Omonia	Limassol
19:00 EET	Kyriakou (yellow card) 12'; Efstathiou (yellow card) 35'; Frangos 39', 51'; Christoforou (yellow card) 90+3'	Report	Derbyshire 36' (pen.) (yellow card) 90+3'; Margaça 69'	Stadium: Tsirio Stadium; Attendance: 1,510; Referee: Nikolas Neokleous

17 November 2017 12	Omonia	1–3	APOEL	Nicosia
19:00 EET	Vouros 80' (o.g.); Lopes (yellow card) 89'	Report	Sallai (yellow card) 49'; Carlão (yellow card) 58'; Zahid 66', 77'; Pérez (yellow card) 90+3'; Efrem 90+4'	Stadium: GSP Stadium; Attendance: 13,225; Referee: Leontios Trattou

26 November 2017 13	Doxa	1–2	Omonia	Nicosia
17:00 EET	Luís Carlos 4'	Report	William 23', 26' (yellow card) 54'	Stadium: Makario Stadium; Attendance: 1,500; Referee: Kostas Psevdiotis

4 December 2017 14	AEK Larnaca	5–0	Omonia	Larnaca
19:00 EET	Taulemesse 11', 38'; Mojsov (yellow card) 64'; Antoniades (yellow card) 67'; Tomàs 72'; Larena 84'; Acorán 86'	Report	Breeveld (yellow card) 35'; William (yellow card) 38'	Stadium: AEK Arena; Attendance: 4,300; Referee: Loukas Soteriou

11 December 2017 15	Omonia	0–1	Apollon Limassol	Nicosia
17:30 EET	Candé (yellow card) 38'; Margaça (yellow card) 86'; Breeveld (yellow card) 90+6'	Report	Sachetti (yellow card) 45+2'; Allan (yellow card) 68'; Sardinero 90+1'; Roberge (yellow card) 90+4'	Stadium: GSP Stadium; Attendance: 5,276; Referee: Leontios Trattou

16 December 2017 16	Ethnikos Achna	2–2	Omonia	Achna, Famagusta
17:00 EET	Chatziaros (yellow card) 6'; Pincelli 11'; Enescu 32' (yellow card) 46'; Bogatinov (yellow card) 89'	Report	Lopes 30'; Christofi 33'; Maduro (yellow card) 36'; Derbyshire (yellow card) 54'	Stadium: Dasaki Stadium; Attendance: 1,400; Referee: Nikolas Neokleous

21 December 2017 17	Omonia	3–0	Pafos FC	Nicosia
19:00 EET	Derbyshire 19' (pen.), 32'; Christofi 51'	Report	Mostefa (yellow card) 33'	Stadium: GSP Stadium; Attendance: 4,302; Referee: Giannis Anastasiou

2 January 2018 18	Alki Oroklini	0–3	Omonia	Larnaca
19:00 EET	Fabrício (yellow card) 40'; Ngomo (yellow card) 66'; Semedo (yellow card) 90+2'	Report	Derbyshire 16'; Candé 41'; Christodoulou (red card) 58'; Christofi (yellow card) 66'; Margaça (yellow card) 71'; Lopes 74'	Stadium: Ammochostos Stadium; Attendance: 2,000; Referee: Avraam Tsoukkas

6 January 2018 19	Olympiakos	2–3	Omonia	Nicosia
16:00 EET	Christofides (yellow card) 66'; Kapartis 82'; Hidi (yellow card) 87'; Polizzi 90'	Report	Lopes 11'; Antonia 20'; Demetriou (yellow card) 60'; Mihaylov (yellow card) 77'; Margaça (yellow card) 90+3'; Breeveld (yellow card) 90+3'; Derbyshire 90+5'	Stadium: Makario Stadium; Attendance: 3,500; Referee: Chrysovalantis Theouli

13 January 2018 20	Omonia	3–0	Ermis	Nicosia
17:00 EET	Christofi 6', 64'; Derbyshire 7'; Katelaris (yellow card) 75'	Report	Damčevski (yellow card) 60'; Zaharia (yellow card) 75'; Monteiro (yellow card) 79'	Stadium: GSP Stadium; Attendance: 6,000; Referee: Loukas Soteriou

17 January 2018 2	Apollon	1–0	Omonia	Limassol
20:00 EET	Yuste 28'; Sardinero (yellow card) 53'	Report	William (yellow card) 25' (yellow-red card) 74'	Stadium: Tsirio Stadium; Attendance: 2,923; Referee: Avraam Tsoukkas

20 January 2018 21	AEL Limassol	2–3	Omonia	Limassol
16:00 EET	Avraam 36'; Arruabarrena 40'; Airosa (yellow card) 44'; Sassi (yellow card) 90+2'	Report	Derbyshire 18'; Soares (yellow card) 28'; Candé 60', 85' (yellow card) 90+3'; Maduro (yellow card) 74'	Stadium: Tsirio Stadium; Attendance: 450; Referee: Christos Nikolaides

30 January 2018 22	Omonia	5–1	Nea Salamina	Nicosia
19:00 EET	Derbyshire 2', 16', 59'; Maduro (yellow card) 28'; Lopes 45+1'; Breeveld (yellow card) 55'; Kipiani 89'; Christofi (yellow card) 90+4'	Report	Correia 21' (yellow card) 33'; Karo (yellow card) 24'; Carlão (yellow card) 45'; Veselovsky (yellow card) 45+2' (yellow-red card) 45+2'; Voskanyan (yellow card) 90+4'	Stadium: GSP Stadium; Attendance: 5,170; Referee: Neofytos Neofytou

7 February 2018 23	Anorthosis	1–2	Omonia	Larnaca
17:00 EET	Palanca (yellow card) 51'; Cissé 54'; Schildenfeld (yellow card) 79'; Economides (yellow card) 88'; Douglão (yellow card) 90+3'	Report	Candé (yellow card) 13'; Antonia (yellow card) 51'; Derbyshire 86', 90+1'; Solomon (yellow card) 88'; Jaílson (yellow card) 90+2'	Stadium: Antonis Papadopoulos; Attendance: 5,000; Referee: Timotheos Christofi

10 February 2018 24	Omonia	3–0	Aris	Nicosia
17:00 EET	Vyntra 7'; Demetriou (yellow card) 52'; Lopes 61'; Soares (yellow card) 65'; Solomon 90'	Report	Tapoko (yellow card) 37'; Frangos (yellow card) 69'; Mammides (yellow card) 86'	Stadium: GSP Stadium; Attendance: 5,611; Referee: Loukas Soteriou

17 February 2018 25	APOEL	2–1	Omonia	Nicosia
17:00 EET	Ebecilio 4', 14' (yellow card) 68'; Sallai (yellow card) 34'; Nsue (yellow card) 51'	Report	Jaílson (yellow card) 34'; Derbyshire 39' (yellow card) 45+3'; Candé (yellow card) 51'; Vyntra (yellow card) 57'; William (yellow card) 57'; Kanu (yellow card) 62'; Solomon (yellow card) 82'	Stadium: GSP Stadium; Attendance: 6,813; Referee: Vasilis Demetriou

25 February 2018 26	Omonia	1–3	Doxa	Nicosia
17:00 EET	Katsantonis 54'; Maduro (yellow card) 61'; Breeveld (yellow card) 82'; Solomon (yellow card) 90+1'	Report	Ba (yellow card) 45'; Kifouéti 45+3'; Sadik 48' (yellow card) 50'; Poutziouris (red card) 52'; Redondo (yellow card) 53'; Papafotis 90+6'	Stadium: GSP Stadium; Attendance: 3,015; Referee: Leontios Trattou

==== Championship Round ====
===== Championship Round table =====
Pos	Team	Pld	W	D	L	GF	GA	GD	Pts	Qualification
1	APOEL (C)	36	27	5	4	92	35	+57	86	Qualification for the Champions League first qualifying round
2	Apollon Limassol	36	25	7	4	90	26	+64	82	Qualification for the Europa League first qualifying round
3	Anorthosis Famagusta	36	19	12	5	53	29	+24	69	Qualification for the Europa League first qualifying round
4	AEK Larnaca	36	20	8	8	74	39	+35	68	Qualification for the Europa League second qualifying round (Note: AEK Larnaca qualified for the Europa League second qualifying round by winning the 2017–18 Cypriot Cup.)
5	AEL Limassol	36	17	7	12	47	38	+9	58	
6	Omonia	36	14	5	17	58	60	−2	47	

Source: CFA (in Greek)
Rules for classification: 1) Points; 2) Head-to-head points; 3) Head-to-head goal difference; 4) Head-to-head goals scored; 5) Head-to-head away goals scored (only if two teams); 6) Goal difference; 7) Goals scored; 8) Play-off (only if deciding champion or UEFA competitions).
(C) Champions

===== Results summary =====
Overall								Home						Away					
Pld	W	D	L	GF	GA	GD	Pts	W	D	L	GF	GA	GD	W	D	L	GF	GA	GD
36	14	5	17	58	60	−2	47	8	3	7	32	24	+8	6	2	10	26	36	−10

Last updated: 13 May 2018.
Source: CFA

===== Results by matchday =====
Matchday	1	2	3	4	5	6	7	8	9	10
Ground	H	A	H	H	A	A	H	A	A	H
Result	L	L	L	L	L	L	L	L	L	W
Position	6	6	6	6	6	6	6	6	6	6

Updated to match(es) played on 13 May 2018. Source: CFA
A = Away; H = Home; W = Win; D = Draw; L = Loss

===== Matches =====
4 March 2018 27	Omonia	0–2	APOEL	Nicosia
15:00 EET	Candé (yellow card) 15'; Breeveld (yellow card) 41'; Antonia (yellow card) 42'; Kanu (yellow card) 83'	Report	Souza 63'; Dellatorre 90+1'	Stadium: GSP Stadium; Attendance: 6,208; Referee: Timotheos Christofi

10 March 2018 28	AEL Limassol	2–1	Omonia	Limassol
15:00 EET	Denílson 34'; Sassi 73'	Report	Derbyshire 86'	Stadium: Tsirio Stadium; Attendance: 911; Referee: Giorgos Nikolaou

17 March 2018 29	Omonia	1–3	AEK Larnaca	Nicosia
17:00 EET	Katelaris (yellow card) 29'; Ekiza (yellow card) 30' (yellow-red card) 49', (goal) 42'; Kipiani (yellow card) 46'	Report	Tričkovski 26'; Acorán 37'; Hevel (yellow card) 55'; Tete 68'	Stadium: GSP Stadium; Attendance: 2,834; Referee: Demetris Masias

1 April 2018 30	Omonia	1–2	Anorthosis	Nicosia
18:00 EEST	Candé (yellow card) 15'; Derbyshire 17'; A. Soares (yellow card) 90+1'	Report	Ďuriš 12', 62'	Stadium: GSP Stadium; Attendance: 3,317; Referee: Nikolas Neokleous

4 April 2018 31	Apollon Limassol	3–0	Omonia	Limassol
19:00 EEST	Zelaya 3', 34'; Schembri 18'	Report	Candé (yellow card) 84'	Stadium: Tsirio Stadium; Attendance: 3,046; Referee: Loukas Soteriou

15 April 2018 32	APOEL	4–1	Omonia	Nicosia
19:00 EEST	Souza 11'; Sallai 23'; Ebecilio (yellow card) 52', (goal) 82'; Nsue 90+4'	Report	Jaílson 39'; A. Soares (yellow card) 51'; Christofi (yellow card) 52'; Derbyshire (yellow card) 53'; Vyntra (red card) 90+3'	Stadium: GSP Stadium; Attendance: 6,665; Referee: Christos Nikolaides

21 April 2018 33	Omonia	1–2	AEL Limassol	Nicosia
18:00 EEST	Derbyshire 18'; Katelaris (yellow card) 30'; Kanu (yellow card) 83' (yellow-red card) 90+5'	Report	Gabionetta (yellow card) 37'; Silva (yellow card) 58'; Román 86'; Benítez (yellow card) 89'; Zdravkovski (yellow card) 90'; Lafrance 90+6'	Stadium: GSP Stadium; Attendance: 1,481; Referee: Vasilis Demetriou

29 April 2018 34	AEK Larnaca	2–0	Omonia	Larnaca
18:00 EEST	Taulemesse 24'; Acorán 66'	Report	Katelaris (yellow card) 90+2'	Stadium: AEK Arena; Attendance: 2,000; Referee: Leontios Trattou

6 May 2018 35	Anorthosis	2–1	Omonia	Larnaca
18:00 EEST	Ďuriš 53'; Rayos 57'	Report	Derbyshire 82'	Stadium: Antonis Papadopoulos; Attendance: 2,143; Referee: Nikolas Neokleous

13 May 2018 36	Omonia	1–0	Apollon Limassol	Nicosia
19:00 EEST	Derbyshire 48'	Report		Stadium: GSP Stadium; Attendance: 800; Referee: Giorgos Nikolaou

=== Cypriot Cup ===
==== Second round ====
14 February 2018 First Leg	Omonia	2–3	Doxa	Nicosia
17:00 EET	Margaça (yellow card) 10'; Lopes (yellow card) 47'; Derbyshire 56', 86' (pen.) (yellow card) 89'; Katelaris (yellow card) 81'	Report	Kifouéti 40'; Rodrigues (yellow card) 47'; Luís Carlos 61'; Narh 82' (yellow card) 84'; Neuton (yellow card) 85'	Stadium: GSP Stadium; Attendance: 3,255; Referee: Christos Nikolaides

21 February 2018 Second Leg	Doxa	1–1 (4–3 agg.)	Omonia	Nicosia
17:00 EET	Sadik 18'	Report	William 69'	Stadium: Makario Stadium; Attendance: 4,000; Referee: Kostas Psevdiotis
