= Fanos Katelaris =

Cypriot footballer

Personal information
- Date of birth: 26 August 1996 (age 30)
- Place of birth: Nicosia, Cyprus
- Height: 1.86 m (6 ft 1 in)
- Position: Defensive midfielder

Team information
- Current team: Anorthosis Famagusta
- Number: 23

Youth career
- Omonia

Senior career*
Years	Team	Apps	(Gls)
2013–2020	Omonia	73	(4)
2013–2014	→ Alki Larnacas (loan)	9	(0)
2014–2015	→ Olympiakos Nicosia (loan)	16	(1)
2020	→ Zalaegerszeg (loan)	13	(0)
2020–2022	Apollon Limassol	25	(0)
2022–2023	Oostende	13	(0)
2023–2025	AEK Larnaca	2	(0)
2025–	Anorthosis Famagusta	0	(0)

International career^{‡}
2014–	Cyprus U19	9	(1)
2015–	Cyprus U21	8	(1)
2017–	Cyprus	12	(1)
- * Club domestic league appearances and goals as of 16:19, 26 May 2025 (UTC) ‡ National team caps and goals as of 1 January 2023

Fanos Katelaris (Greek: Φάνος Κατελάρης; born 26 August 1996) is a Cypriot professional footballer who plays as a defensive midfielder for Cypriot First Division club Anorthosis Famagusta. He is also of Congolese origin through his mother.

== Club career ==
On 15 June 2022 Oostende announced the signing of Katelaris on a free transfer.

== Career statistics ==
=== Club ===
As of 30 May 2025

Club	Season	League			National Cup		Continental		Other		Total	
Club	Season	Division	Apps	Goals	Apps	Goals	Apps	Goals	Apps	Goals	Apps	Goals
Alki Larnacas (loan)	2013–14	Cypriot First Division	9	0	1	0	—		—		10	0
Alki Larnacas (loan)	Total		9	0	1	0	—		—		10	0
Olympiakos Nicosia (loan)	2014–15	Cypriot Second Division	16	1	2	0	—		—		18	1
Olympiakos Nicosia (loan)	Total		16	1	2	0	—		—		18	1
Omonia	2015–16	Cypriot First Division	0	0	1	0	—		—		1	0
Omonia	2016–17	Cypriot First Division	26	3	3	0	1	0	—		30	3
Omonia	2017–18	Cypriot First Division	27	0	1	0	—		—		28	0
Omonia	2018–19	Cypriot First Division	17	1	2	0	—		—		19	1
Omonia	2019–20	Cypriot First Division	3	0	0	0	—		—		3	0
Omonia	Total		73	4	7	0	1	0	0	0	81	4
Zalaegerszeg (loan)	2019–20	Nemzeti Bajnokság I	13	0	4	0	—		—		17	0
Zalaegerszeg (loan)	Total		13	0	4	0	—		—		17	0
Apollon Limassol	2020–21	Cypriot First Division	12	0	1	0	1	0	—		14	0
Apollon Limassol	2021–22	Cypriot First Division	13	0	1	0	2	0	—		16	0
Apollon Limassol	Total		25	0	2	0	3	0	—		30	0
Oostende	2022–23	Belgian First Division A	13	0	1	0	—		—		14	0
AEK Larnaca	2023–24	Cypriot First Division	1	0	0	0	0	0	—		1	0
AEK Larnaca	2024–25	Cypriot First Division	1	0	0	0	0	0	—		1	0
AEK Larnaca	Total		2	0	0	0	0	0	—		2	0
Career total			151	5	17	0	4	0	0	0	172	5

== International career ==
=== International goals ===
Scores and results list Cyprus' goal tally first.

No	Date	Venue	Opponent	Score	Result	Competition
1.	22 March 2017	GSP Stadium, Nicosia, Cyprus	Kazakhstan	2–1	3–1	Friendly

== Honours ==
AEK Larnaca

- Cypriot Cup: 2024–25
