= Leandro González =

Argentine footballer

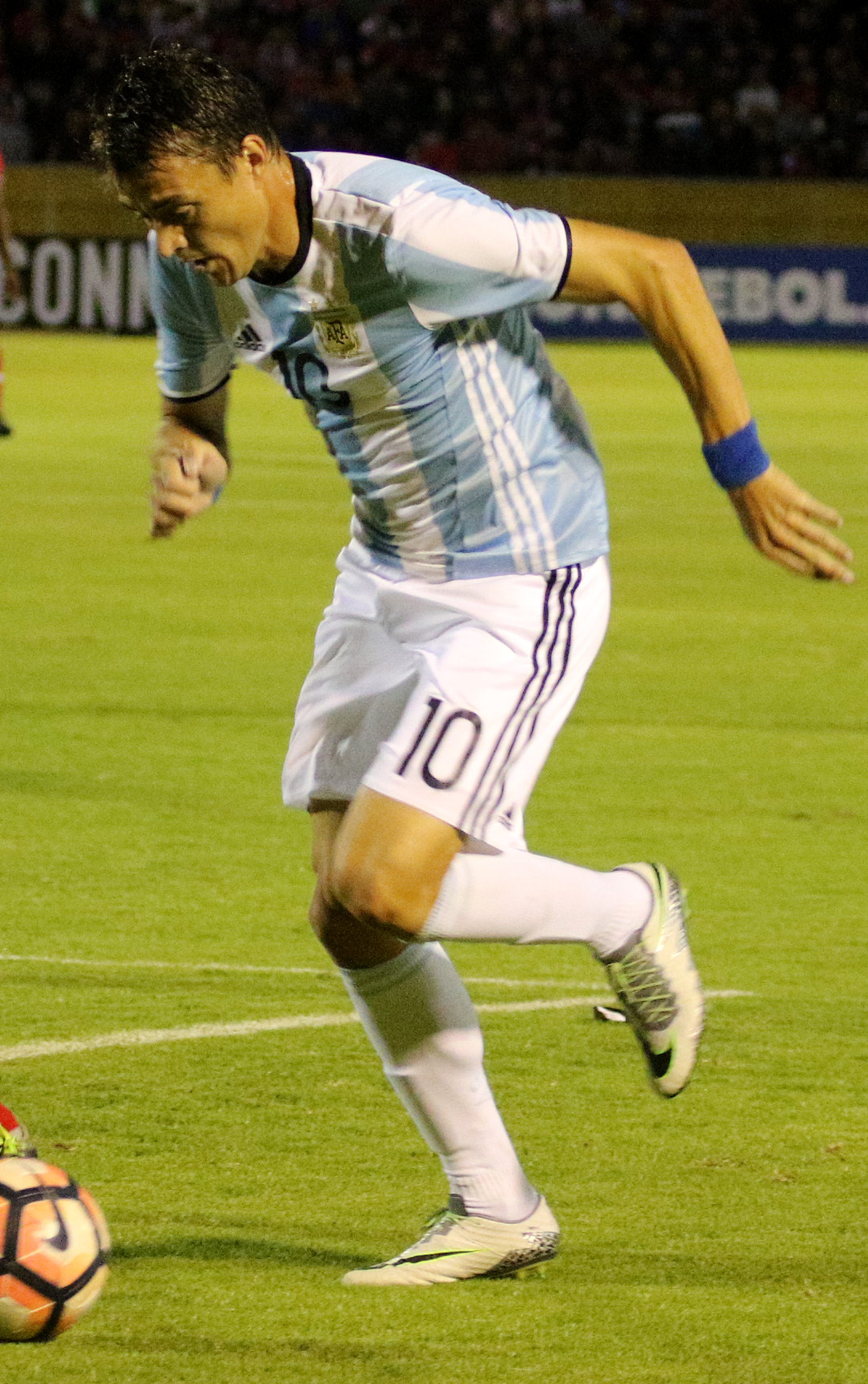
- González in 2017

Personal information
- Full name: Leandro González
- Date of birth: 14 October 1985 (age 41)
- Place of birth: Pigüé, Argentina
- Height: 1.85 m (6 ft 1 in)
- Positions: Forward; winger

Team information
- Current team: Gimnasia Jujuy

Youth career
- Olimpo

Senior career*
Years	Team	Apps	(Gls)
2005–2008	Olimpo	37	(5)
2008–2009	Racing Club	30	(3)
2009–2012	Estudiantes	39	(5)
2011–2012	→ Colón (loan)	21	(1)
2013	Olimpo	11	(1)
2013–2014	San Martín (SJ)	33	(9)
2014–2015	Defensa y Justicia	12	(0)
2015–2017	Atlético Tucumán	81	(15)
2017	Omonia	11	(2)
2018	Quilmes	11	(5)
2018–2019	Temperley	22	(1)
2019–2021	Quilmes	26	(7)
2021–	Gimnasia Jujuy	56	(12)
- * Club domestic league appearances and goals as of 13:18, 22 July 2019 (UTC)

Leandro González (born 14 October 1985) is an Argentine professional footballer who plays as a forward for Gimnasia Jujuy. He can play as a second forward or wide on the right or left wing.

== Club career ==
González started his playing career in 2005 with Olimpo de Bahía Blanca, the club were relegated to the Argentine 2nd division in 2006, but they bounced straight back, winning both the Apertura and Clausura championships in 2006–07. The following season they were relegated again, prompting González to join Racing Club in 2008.

In 2009, González was transferred to Estudiantes, and he scored his first official goal in a Copa Libertadores 5–1 rout of Peruvian side Juan Aurich, 11 February 2010 .

=== Omonia Nicosia ===
On 6 July 2017, Cypriot First Division club Omonia Nicosia announced the signing of González. He made his debut on 10 September 2017, against Ethnikos Achna in the 2017–18 First Division.

== Honours ==
Olimpo

- Primera B Nacional: 2006–07

Estudiantes

- Argentine Primera División: 2010 Apertura
