= Alexandros Antoniou =

Cypriot footballer

Personal information
- Full name: Alexandros Antoniou
- Date of birth: 3 September 1999 (age 27)
- Place of birth: Nicosia, Cyprus
- Height: 1.83 m (6 ft 0 in)
- Position: Goalkeeper

Team information
- Current team: Doxa Katokopias
- Number: 61

Youth career
- 2011–2017: Omonia

Senior career*
Years	Team	Apps	(Gls)
2017–2020	Omonia	1	(0)
2019–2020	→ Ermis Aradippou (loan)	18	(0)
2020–2022	Ermis Aradippou	3	(0)
2021–2022	→ MEAP Nisou (loan)	26	(0)
2022–2023	MEAP Nisou	29	(0)
2023–	Doxa Katokopias	20	(0)
- * Club domestic league appearances and goals as of 20 June 2024

Alexandros Antoniou (Greek: Αλέξανδρος Αντωνίου; born 3 September 1999) is a Cypriot football who currently plays for Doxa Katokopias as a goalkeeper.

== Club statistics ==
As of match played 25 February 2018

Club	Season	League		Cup		Total	
Club	Season	Apps	Goals	Apps	Goals	Apps	Goals
Omonia
Omonia	2017–18	1	0	0	0	0	1
Career total		1	0	0	0	0	1
