= Hedwiges Maduro =

Dutch football manager (born 1985)

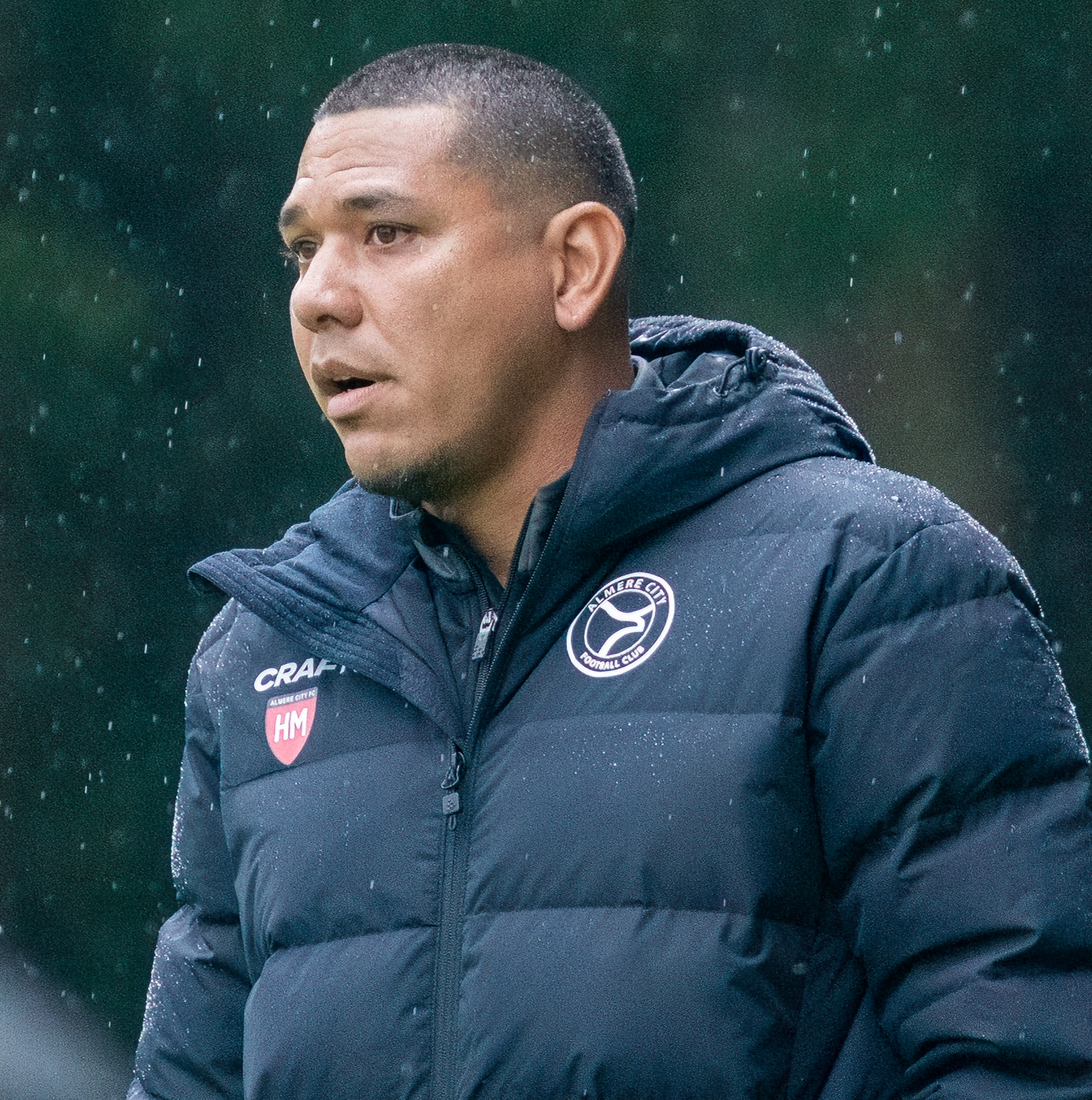
- Maduro managing Almere City in 2024

Personal information
- Full name: Hedwiges Eduard Martinus Maduro
- Date of birth: 13 February 1985 (age 41)
- Place of birth: Almere, Netherlands
- Height: 1.85 m (6 ft 1 in)
- Positions: Defensive midfielder; centre-back

Youth career
- 1991–1996: ASC Waterwijk
- 1996–2001: Sporting Flevoland
- 2001–2003: Omniworld
- 2003–2004: Ajax

Senior career*
Years	Team	Apps	(Gls)
2004–2008	Ajax	70	(9)
2008–2012	Valencia	76	(2)
2012–2014	Sevilla	26	(0)
2014–2015	PAOK	19	(3)
2015–2017	Groningen	32	(1)
2017–2018	Omonia	28	(1)
Total		251	(16)

International career
2005–2007	Netherlands U21	9	(1)
2005–2011	Netherlands	18	(0)

Managerial career
- 2020–2022: Almere City U21
- 2023: Ajax (caretaker)
- 2024: Almere City
Medal record
Men's football
Representing Netherlands
UEFA European Under-21 Championship
Winner	2007
- * Club domestic league appearances and goals

Hedwiges Eduard Martinus Maduro (born 13 February 1985) is a Dutch professional football coach and former player. A defensive midfielder by trade, he was also deployed as a central defender, emerging from the academy of Ajax and making his senior debut for the club at the age of 19.

Maduro spent the majority of his club career in La Liga, most notably with Valencia, for whom he made over 100 competitive appearances and won the 2008 Copa del Rey. He later played in the top divisions of Greece and Cyprus before retiring in 2018.

A Dutch international during the 2000s, Maduro earned 18 caps and was part of the Netherlands squad at the 2006 FIFA World Cup.

After retiring from playing, Maduro moved into coaching. Following roles in youth and assistant positions, he served as head coach of Almere City during the first half of the 2024–25 season. He was dismissed in December 2024.

== Club career ==
=== Ajax ===
Maduro was born in Almere, Flevoland. At Ajax, he was voted as the Amsterdam club's brightest emerging talent in the 2003–04 season, and made his Eredivisie debut in the following campaign, his debut in the competition coming against Roda JC on 27 February 2005 in a 2–1 away win.

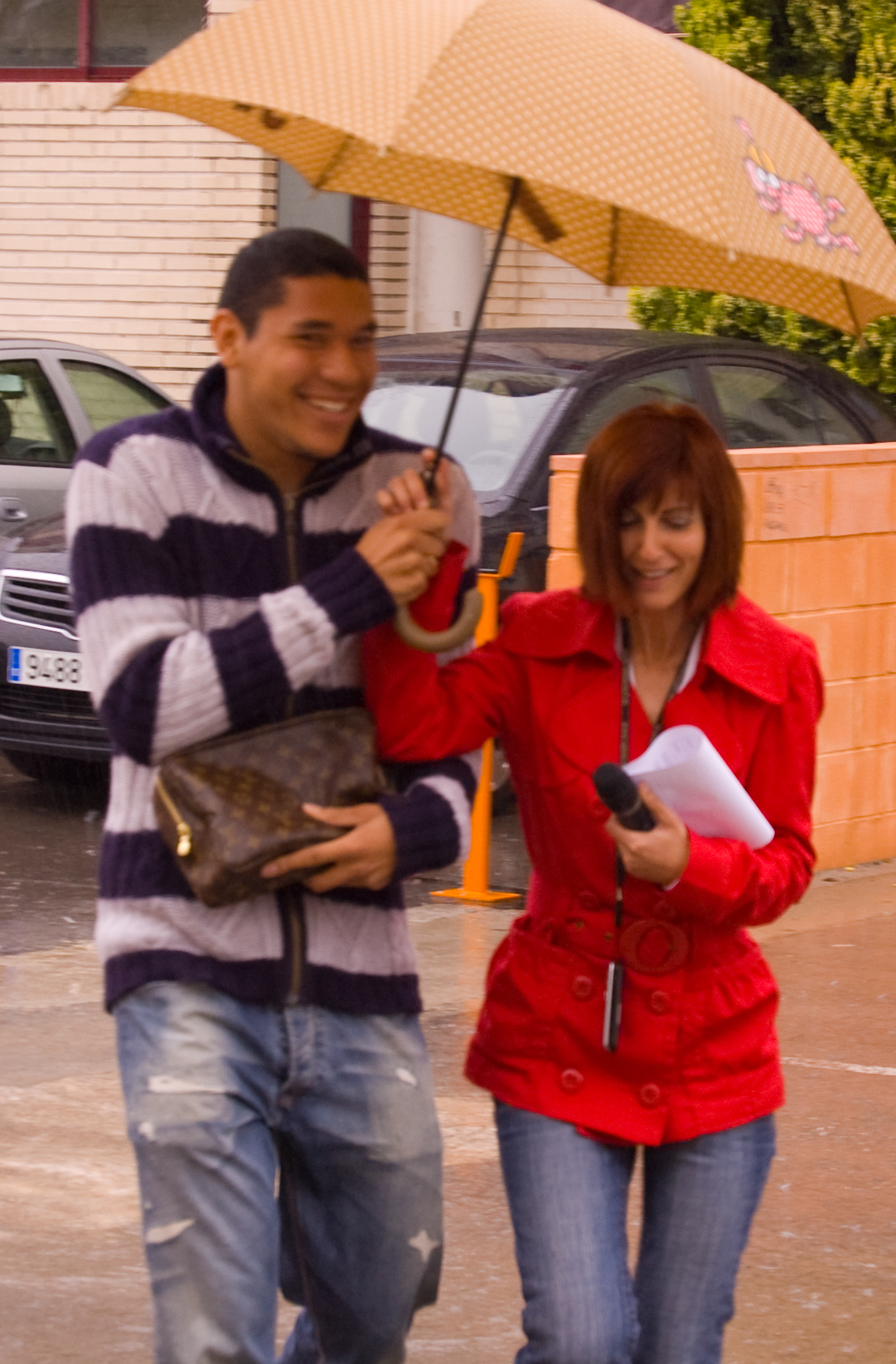
Maduro with a Spanish journalist

In the following years, Maduro started more often than not for Ajax, helping the team to two KNVB Cups and three Johan Cruyff Shields. He appeared in 105 games overall for them, scoring eleven goals.

=== Valencia ===
In mid-January 2008, after helping Ajax to the third consecutive Johan Cruyff Shield, Maduro joined Valencia, in a four-and-a-half-year deal worth €3 million; compatriot Ronald Koeman was the team manager. His La Liga debut came late in the month a 0–1 home loss against Almería, and he started in all 11 matches he played in his first year, but the Che could only finish tenth even though they won the Copa del Rey, with the player being an unused substitute in the final against Getafe (Koeman had already been fired at that point).

In his first full season in Spain, Maduro started playing a small role, a situation which was created after his late return from the 2008 Summer Olympics. However, new coach Unai Emery eventually awarded him minutes due to injuries and suspensions, and he performed well in various positions, including right-back. On 25 April 2009, he scored his first competitive goal for the club, netting from a corner kick to make it 1–1 against Barcelona in an eventual 2–2 home draw; with the team finally finishing in sixth position he made more than 30 appearances during the campaign, in spite of facing stiff competition from the likes of Alexis or Carlos Marchena, as only Raúl Albiol was an undisputed starter in the back-four sector.

Maduro spent the vast majority of 2011–12 on the sidelines, nursing a serious ankle injury.

=== Sevilla ===
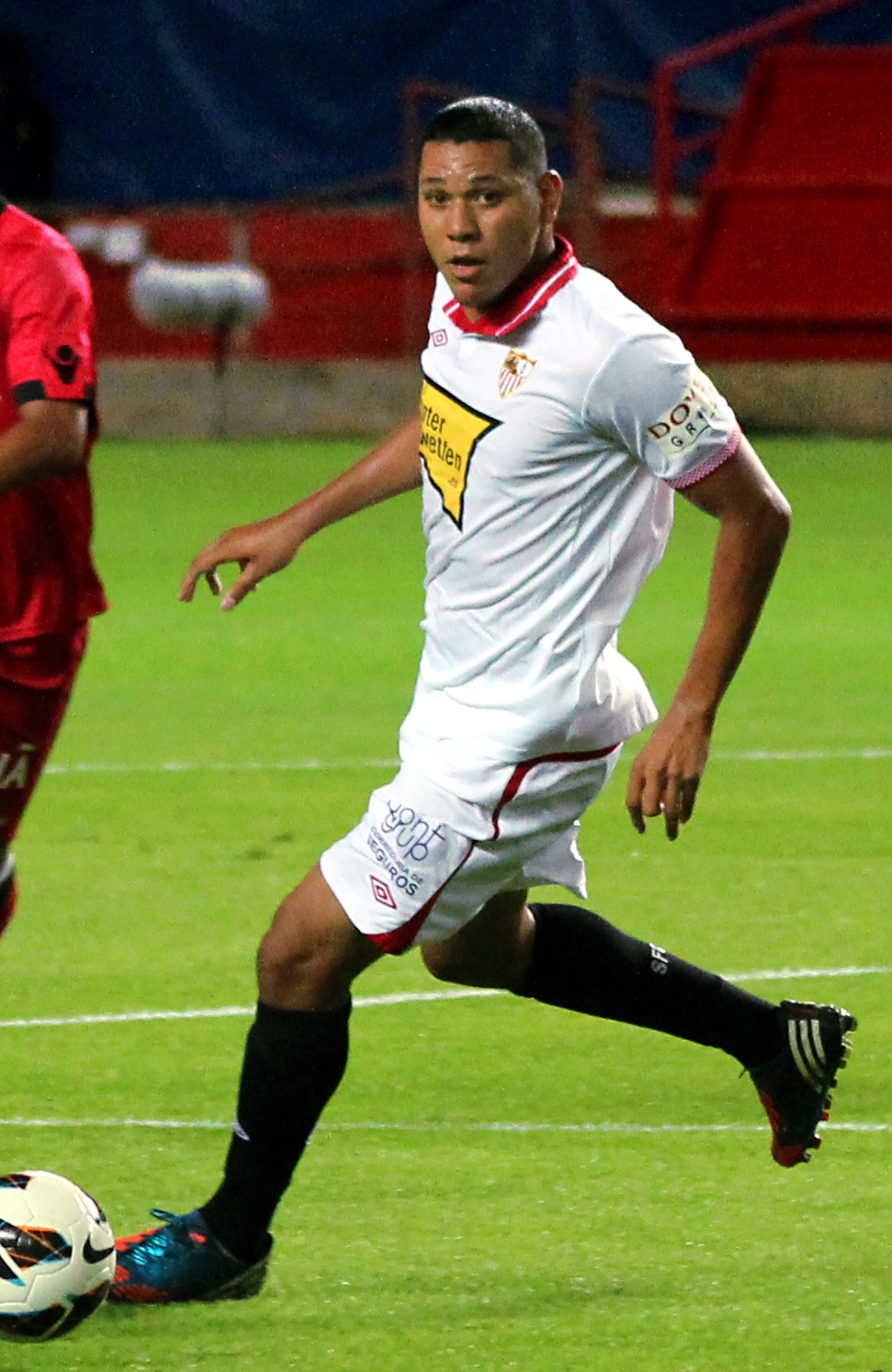
Maduro in action for Sevilla in 2012

On 5 June 2012, Sevilla announced on their official website the signing of Maduro on a free transfer. He turned down a contract extension at Valencia, and also had an offer from Spartak Moscow, who had just hired his former boss Emery, finishing his debut season in Andalusia with 30 games all competitions comprised to help the side to the ninth place, in spite of being diagnosed with a heart condition in the previous summer.

With Míchel gone from the bench and Emery being hired as his replacement, Maduro was quickly deemed surplus to requirements.

=== PAOK ===
On 2 January 2014, it was announced that Maduro would sign with Greece's PAOK for two and a half years. The deal was confirmed five days later.

In February 2015, nursing a hand injury, Maduro requested a leave of absence and visited his former club Ajax. After being linked to Feyenoord, his contract expired and both parties agreed to part ways.

=== Omonia ===
On 20 July 2017, the 32-year-old Maduro signed a two-year contract with Cypriot First Division side Omonia for an undisclosed fee, arriving from Groningen. He made his debut on 10 September in the season opener, a 2–1 home win against Ethnikos.

On 9 August 2018, Maduro announced his retirement through a short video on Twitter.

== International career ==
Shortly after making his league debut with Ajax, Maduro won his first cap for the Netherlands on 26 March 2005, in a 2006 FIFA World Cup qualifier against Romania. He was picked for the final squad-of-23 by national team manager Marco van Basten – also his coach in Ajax's youth system – appearing four minutes in the 0–0 group stage draw against Argentina in an eventual round-of-16 exit.

In 2007, despite already having amassed 12 senior caps, Maduro took part in the UEFA European Under-21 Championship which was held in the Netherlands, and scored the competition's first goal when the Jong Oranje beat Israel 1–0. He also played in the second match, a 2–1 win against Portugal which secured a semi-final spot and qualification to the Olympic tournament.

In the semi-finals against England (1–1 after 120 minutes) Maduro successfully converted his penalty shootout attempt, as Holland won it 13–12 after 32 shots. The Dutch went on to retain their 2006 title by beating Serbia 4–1 in the final, and he was named in the 'UEFA Team of the Tournament'.

== Coaching career ==
In addition to his work as an analyst on ESPN, Maduro also started his training as a professional football coach. During the 2018–2019 season, he was assistant coach to Erwin van de Looi at Netherlands U21. The following season, he was assistant coach at the Netherlands U18. In mid-2020, he became head coach of Almere City U21. He led the team to the U21 Division 1 title in 2022. Starting in December 2021, he also worked as an assistant coach of the Almere City first team. In April 2022, it was announced he would be an assistant for the first team by signing a two-year contract.

In June 2023, Maduro signed a three-year contract to become the assistant coach at his former club, Ajax. On 23 October that year, he became the caretaker manager of the club, following the dismissal of Maurice Steijn. Three days later, he lost his debut 2–0 away to Brighton & Hove Albion in the Europa League group stage; in his maiden league game on 29 October, the team lost 5–2 at PSV before John van 't Schip was appointed the next day.

== Managerial career ==
On 13 May 2024, Maduro was announced as Eredivisie club Almere City's new head coach ahead of the 2024–25 season. Upon joining he stated, "As a native of Almere, Almere City FC and the city of Almere mean a lot to me. I am therefore happy to return to the club where I started my coaching career."

On 18 December 2024, Maduro was dismissed from his role as head coach at Almere City.

== Personal life ==
Maduro's father was originally from the town Paradera on Aruba, and his mother was from Curaçao, both being islands in the Dutch Caribbean.

== Career statistics ==
=== Club ===
Appearances and goals by club, season and competition
Club	Season	League			Cup		Europe		Other (Note: Includes Eredivisie and Super League Greece playoffs)		Total	
Club	Season	Division	Apps	Goals	Apps	Goals	Apps	Goals	Apps	Goals	Apps	Goals
Ajax	2004–05	Eredivisie	12	2	0	0	1	0	—		13	2
Ajax	2005–06	Eredivisie	28	3	6	0	9	0	2	0	45	3
Ajax	2006–07	Eredivisie	15	0	7	1	7	0	2	0	31	1
Ajax	2007–08	Eredivisie	15	4	3	1	2	0	—		20	5
Ajax	Total		70	9	16	2	19	0	4	0	109	11
Valencia	2007–08	La Liga	11	0	4	0	0	0	—		15	0
Valencia	2008–09	La Liga	22	1	6	0	6	0	—		34	1
Valencia	2009–10	La Liga	18	0	2	0	12	1	—		32	1
Valencia	2010–11	La Liga	18	1	4	0	2	0	—		24	1
Valencia	2011–12	La Liga	7	0	0	0	1	0	—		8	0
Valencia	Total		76	2	16	0	21	1	—		113	3
Sevilla	2012–13	La Liga	26	0	4	0	0	0	—		30	0
Sevilla	2013–14	La Liga	0	0	0	0	1	0	—		1	0
Sevilla	Total		26	0	4	0	1	0	0	0	31	0
PAOK	2013–14	Super League Greece	9	2	4	1	2	0	—		15	3
PAOK	2014–15	Super League Greece	10	1	1	0	4	0	1	0	16	1
PAOK	Total		19	3	5	1	6	0	1	0	31	4
Groningen	2015–16	Eredivisie	28	1	2	1	8	1	2	0	40	3
Groningen	2016–17	Eredivisie	4	0	0	0	0	0	1	0	5	0
Groningen	Total		32	1	2	1	8	1	3	0	45	3
Omonia	2017–18	Cypriot First Division	28	1	0	0	0	0	—		28	1
Career total			251	16	43	4	55	2	8	0	357	22

=== International ===
Appearances and goals by national team and year
National team	Year	Apps	Goals
Netherlands	2005	8	0
Netherlands	2006	4	0
Netherlands	2007	0	0
Netherlands	2008	0	0
Netherlands	2009	0	0
Netherlands	2010	3	0
Netherlands	2011	3	0
Total		18	0

=== Managerial ===
As of match played 15 December 2024

Managerial record by team and tenure
Team	From	To	Record				
Team	From	To	P	W	D	L	Win %
Almere City	1 July 2024	18 December 2024	17	1	3	13	5.88
Total			17	1	3	13	5.88

== Honours ==
Ajax

- KNVB Cup: 2005–06, 2006–07
- Johan Cruyff Shield: 2005, 2006, 2007

Valencia

- Copa del Rey: 2007–08

PAOK

- Greek Football Cup runner-up: 2013–14

Netherlands U21

- UEFA European Under-21 Championship: 2007

Individual

- Ajax Talent of the Future/Talent of the Year: 2005
