= Alex Soares =

Portuguese footballer (born 1991)

Personal information
- Full name: Alexandre Miguel Barros Soares
- Date of birth: 1 March 1991 (age 35)
- Place of birth: Lisbon, Portugal
- Height: 1.79 m (5 ft 10 in)
- Position: Midfielder

Youth career
- 2000–2007: Benfica
- 2007–2008: Odivelas
- 2008–2009: Oeiras
- 2009–2010: Belenenses

Senior career*
Years	Team	Apps	(Gls)
2010–2011	Esperança Lagos	27	(4)
2011	Panserraikos	0	(0)
2012–2014	Marítimo B	36	(1)
2013–2017	Marítimo	91	(3)
2017–2019	Omonia	57	(2)
2019–2021	Moreirense	59	(1)
2021–2022	Volos	20	(1)
2023	Petro Atlético	8	(0)
2023–2024	Estoril	6	(0)
2024–2025	Portimonense	6	(0)
2025–2026	Samora Correia	11	(1)
- * Club domestic league appearances and goals as of 17:38, 8 November 2026 (UTC)

Alexandre Miguel Barros Soares (born 1 March 1991) is a Portuguese professional footballer who plays as a midfielder.

== Club career ==
Born in Lisbon, Soares played youth football with four local clubs, including S.L. Benfica from ages 9 to 16. He made his senior debut with C.F. Esperança de Lagos, in the fourth division.

In January 2012, following a very brief spell in Greece with Panserraikos FC, Soares returned to his country, joining C.S. Marítimo and being assigned to the reserves in the third tier. Two years later, manager Pedro Martins promoted him to the first team.

Soares made his Primeira Liga debut on 18 August 2013, starting and being booked in a 2–1 home win against his former employers Benfica. He scored his first goal in the competition on 24 November of that year, helping the hosts defeat Gil Vicente F.C. 3–2.

On 3 July 2017, having averaged 23 league appearances at the Estádio do Marítimo, Soares moved abroad again and signed a two-year contract with Cypriot First Division side AC Omonia. He made his debut on 10 September in the season opener, a 2–1 home win against Ethnikos Achna FC, and scored his first goal ten days later with a chip in a 5–2 victory over AEK Larnaca FC.

Soares returned to Portugal and its top flight in the summer of 2019, agreeing to a two-year deal at Moreirense FC. After it expired, he joined Volos F.C. in Super League Greece.

On 30 July 2023, Soares signed a one-year contract with G.D. Estoril Praia. However, he left in January 2024 by mutual agreement, with only seven competitive games to his credit.

Soares joined Portimonense S.C. of Liga Portugal 2 on 29 August 2024.

== Personal life ==
Soares' younger brother, Filipe, is also a footballer and a midfielder.
