= Jonathan Benteke =

Belgian footballer (born 1995)

Personal information
- Full name: Jonathan Benteke Lifeka
- Date of birth: 28 April 1995 (age 31)
- Place of birth: Liège, Belgium
- Height: 1.86 m (6 ft 1 in)
- Position: Forward

Youth career
- 2004–2006: JS Pierreuse
- 2006–2007: Standard Liège
- 2007–2009: CS Visé
- 2009–2013: Standard Liège

Senior career*
Years	Team	Apps	(Gls)
2013–2014	CS Visé	20	(2)
2014–2016	Zulte-Waregem	25	(2)
2016–2017	Crystal Palace	1	(0)
2017–2018	Omonia	3	(0)
2018–2019	Oldham Athletic	10	(1)
2019–2020	Alemannia Aachen	14	(3)
2020–2021	URSL Visé		
2021–2022	Wegberg-Beeck	28	(7)
2022	Loudoun United	5	(1)
2023–2024	UT Pétange	17	(6)
2024–2025	Shamakhi	16	(0)
- * Club domestic league appearances and goals

Jonathan Benteke Lifeka (born 28 April 1995) is a Belgian former footballer who played as a forward.

== Career ==
=== Early career ===
Benteke played youth football for JS Pierreuse before moving to the higher level Standard Liège in 2006 where he stayed for a season before moving to Visé's youth side. In 2009, he moved back to Standard where he played for four seasons in their youth teams without appearing for the first team. On his release from Standard, he rejoined Visé, where he made his professional first team appearance and was at the time playing in the Belgian Second Division. While at C.S. Visé, Benteke went on to make eighteen appearances and scoring two times.

=== Zulte-Waregem ===
On 24 June 2014, it was reported that Benteke was in talks over a move to Zulte-Waregem. The move was confirmed on 28 June 2014, when he signed a three-year contract.

However, at the start of the season, Benteke suffered a groin injury and did not return to training until September. It was not until 27 September 2014 that Benteke made his Zulte Waregem debut against Anderlecht, replacing Glynor Plet after 70 minutes. It was not until 21 January 2015 that he scored his first Zulte-Waregem goal, in a 4–2 loss against Anderlecht in the quarter-final of Beker Van Belgie. Benteke went on to score two goals in the league against Genk and Oostende. At the end of the 2014–15 season, Benteke had made eight appearances, scoring three times in all competitions.

However, the 2015–16 season saw Benteke competing for a first-team role under the management of Francky Dury. As a result, Benteke spent most of the season on the substitutes bench and did not score goals in his seventeen appearances in all competitions that season.

=== Crystal Palace ===
On 1 September 2016, Benteke joined the development squad of Premier League side Crystal Palace, where his brother played.

Nine days later he made his debut in a 2–1 win at Middlesbrough, replacing his sibling for the final six minutes; they were the first Belgian brothers to play in England's top flight. At the end of the month, he suffered a knee meniscus injury, ruling him out for the next three or four months; his manager Alan Pardew called this "disappointing". Benteke was released by the club at the end of the 2016–17 season.

=== Omonia Nicosia ===
In September 2017, Cypriot First Division club Omonia Nicosia signed Benteke on a two-year contract.

=== Oldham Athletic ===
On 6 February 2018, Benteke signed with League One Club Oldham Athletic on a short-term deal until the end of the season. On 27 July, Benteke signed a new one-year contract with the club.

After a spell in Germany, Benteke returned in Belgium in August 2020 to join URSL Visé.

=== Shamakhi ===
On 20 July 2024, Azerbaijan Premier League club Shamakhi announced the signing of Benteke to a one-year contract.

== Personal life ==
Benteke is of Congolese descent and was born in Belgium to Congolese parents, and is the younger brother of Christian Benteke, who plays as a forward for Al Wahda FC and the Belgium national team.

== Career statistics ==
As of match played 14 May 2022

Club	Season	League			FA Cup		League Cup		Other		Total	
Club	Season	Division	Apps	Goals	Apps	Goals	Apps	Goals	Apps	Goals	Apps	Goals
Visé	2013–14	Belgian Second Division	20	2	0	0	0	0	0	0	20	2
Zulte-Waregem	2014–15	Belgian Pro League	6	2	2	1	0	0	0	0	8	3
Zulte-Waregem	2015–16	Belgian Pro League	15	0	2	0	0	0	0	0	17	0
Zulte-Waregem	Total		21	2	4	1	0	0	0	0	25	3
Crystal Palace	2016–17	Premier League	1	0	0	0	0	0	0	0	1	0
Omonia	2017–18	Cypriot First Division	3	0	0	0	0	0	0	0	3	0
Oldham Athletic	2017–18	EFL League One	1	0	0	0	0	0	0	0	1	0
Oldham Athletic	2018–19	EFL League Two	9	1	0	0	1	0	2 (Note: Appearances in EFL Trophy)	1	12	2
Oldham Athletic	Total		10	1	0	0	1	0	2	1	13	2
Alemannia Aachen	2019–20	Regionalliga	14	3	0	0	0	0	0	0	14	3
URSL Visé	2020–21	Belgian National Division 1	?	?	1	0	?	?	?	?	1	0
Wegberg-Beeck	2021–22	Regionalliga	28	7	0	0	0	0	0	0	28	7
Career total			97	15	5	1	1	0	2	1	103	17
