= Our Lady and St John Catholic College =

Our Lady & St John Catholic College

Location
- North Road; Blackburn, Lancashire, BB1 1PY; England; 53°44′32″N 2°27′16″W

Information
- Type: Voluntary aided
- Religious affiliation: Roman Catholic
- Established: 1987; 39 years ago
- Local authority: Blackburn with Darwen
- Department for Education URN: 119790 Tables
- Ofsted: Reports
- Chair of governors: Canon Jude Harrison
- Headteacher: Peter Tite
- Gender: Coeducational
- Age: 11 to 16
- Enrolment: 1,000
- Website: olsj.blackburn.sch.uk

Our Lady & St John Catholic College is a mixed 11-16 comprehensive school in Blackburn, Lancashire, England.

The school was created in 1987 by the amalgamation of Notre Dame Grammar School and St. John Rigby R.C. High School. A purpose-built vocational centre opened in September 2009.

== Attainment ==
In 2009, 69% of Year 11 students achieved 5 A*-C GCSE passes. The school's value-added measure was 1011 in 2007 (national average 1000).

== Alumni ==
Notre Dame High School

- Matt Derbyshire, professional footballer
- Polly James, actress who played Beryl Hennessey in The Liver Birds
