= Andreas Christodoulou (footballer, born 1997) =

Cypriot footballer (born 1997)

Personal information
- Full name: Andreas Christodoulou
- Date of birth: 26 March 1997 (age 29)
- Place of birth: New Jersey, United States
- Height: 1.97 m (6 ft 6 in)
- Position: Goalkeeper

Team information
- Current team: APOEL
- Number: 22

Youth career
- Olympiakos Nicosia

Senior career*
Years	Team	Apps	(Gls)
2013–2015	Olympiakos Nicosia	18	(0)
2015–2018	Omonia	20	(0)
2018–2021	AEK Larnaca	2	(0)
2021–2022	Ethnikos Achna	21	(0)
2022–	APOEL	6	(0)

International career^{‡}
2014	Cyprus U17	3	(0)
2014–2016	Cyprus U19	12	(0)
2016–2019	Cyprus U21	8	(0)
2022–	Cyprus	1	(0)
- * Club domestic league appearances and goals as of 12 June 2026 ‡ National team caps and goals as of 09:37, 14 November 2018 (UTC)

Andreas Christodoulou (Greek: Ανδρέας Χριστοδούλου, born 26 March 1997) is a Cypriot professional footballer who plays as a goalkeeper for Cypriot First Division club APOEL and the Cyprus national team.

== Club career ==
Christodoulou is a product of the Olympiakos Nicosia academies. He made 18 appearances for Olympiakos Nicosia. On 30 August 2015 he moved to Omonoia. He made his first team debut on 5 November in a win over AEZ Zakakiou in relief of Constantinos Panagi. He is related to Sotiris Kaiafas. On 8 July 2017, he signed a contract renewal until the summer of 2020.

== Club statistics ==
As of match played 8 July 2024

Club	Season	League		Cup		Continental		Other		Total	
Club	Season	Apps	Goals	Apps	Goals	Apps	Goals	Apps	Goals	Apps	Goals
Olympiakos	2013–14	4	0	1	0	—		—		5	0
Olympiakos	2014–15	14	0	2	0	—		—		16	0
Olympiakos	Total	18	0	3	0	—		—		21	0
Omonia	2015–16	0	0	0	0	—		—		0	0
Omonia	2016–17	5	0	0	0	—		—		5	0
Omonia	2017–18	15	0	2	0	—		—		17	0
Omonia	Total	20	0	2	0	—		—		22	0
AEK Larnaca	2018–19	1	0	0	0	1	0	0	0	2	0
AEK Larnaca	2019–20	0	0	2	0	0	0	—		2	0
AEK Larnaca	2020–21	1	0	0	0	—		—		1	0
AEK Larnaca	Total	2	0	2	0	1	0	0	0	5	0
Ethnikos Achna	2021–22	21	0	8	0	—		—		29	0
APOEL	2022–23	5	0	0	0	0	0	—		5	0
APOEL	2023–24	0	0	1	0	0	0	—		1	0
APOEL	Total	5	0	1	0	0	0	0	0	6	0
Career Total		66	0	16	0	1	0	0	0	83	0

== Honours ==
AEK Larnaca

- Cypriot Super Cup: 2018

APOEL

- Cypriot First Division: 2023–24
