= Kanu (footballer, born 1987) =

Brazilian footballer

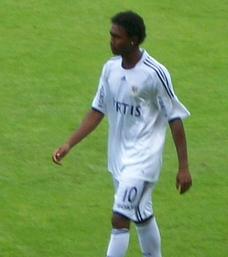

Personal information
- Full name: Rubenilson dos Santos da Rocha
- Date of birth: 23 September 1987 (age 39)
- Place of birth: Salvador, Brazil
- Height: 1.88 m (6 ft 2 in)
- Position: Midfielder

Team information
- Current team: Zelzate

Senior career*
Years	Team	Apps	(Gls)
2007–2008	Grêmio Barueri	4	(1)
2008	→ Juventus-SP (loan)	11	(2)
2008	→ Anderlecht (loan)	1	(0)
2009–2013	Anderlecht	79	(12)
2009	→ Cercle Brugge (loan)	13	(0)
2013–2016	Terek Grozny	54	(2)
2016	Buriram United	0	(0)
2017–2018	Omonia	22	(0)
2018–2019	Kortrijk	16	(1)
2019	Al-Raed	13	(1)
2020–2021	Xylotymbou	16	(4)
2021	Juazeirense	6	(0)
2021–2022	Rupel Boom	25	(2)
2023	Diest	0	(0)
2023	Rupel Boom	12	(2)
2024–	Zelzate	0	(0)
- * Club domestic league appearances and goals as of 12 November 2023

Rubenilson dos Santos da Rocha (born 23 September 1987), commonly known as Kanu, is a Brazilian footballer who plays as a midfielder for Belgian club Zelzate.

== Club career ==
Before signing at Anderlecht, Kanu was on trial with FC Groningen. On 13 December 2008, he was loaned out to Cercle Brugge and on 30 June 2009 returned to Anderlecht.

In February 2014, Kanu agree to switch to Russian Premier League side Terek Grozny.

On 23 June 2017, Kanu signed a deal with the Cypriot First Division club Omonia Nicosia. He made his debut on 10 September 2017 against Ethnikos Achna on the 2017–18 First Division season and gave an assist to Matt Derbyshire for the winning goal.

On 31 January 2023, Kanu joined Diest in Belgium.

== Statistics ==
As of 16 May 2016

Club statistics
Season	Club	League	League		Cup		Continental		Total	
Season	Club	League	App	Goals	App	Goals	App	Goals	App	Goals
2012–13	Terek Grozny	Russian Premier League	6	1	0	0	—		6	1
2013–14	Terek Grozny	Russian Premier League	25	1	3	0	—		28	1
2014–15	Terek Grozny	Russian Premier League	18	0	1	0	—		19	0
2015–16	Terek Grozny	Russian Premier League	5	0	2	1	—		7	1
Total	Russia		54	2	6	1	—		60	3
Career total			54	2	6	1	—		60	3

== Personal life ==
Kanu chose his football name as a reference to Nwankwo Kanu.
