= 2017–18 Cypriot First Division =

Cyta Championship
- Season: 2017–18
- Champions: APOEL; 27th title
- Relegated: Olympiakos; Aris; Ethnikos
- Champions League: APOEL
- Europa League: Apollon; Anorthosis; AEK Larnaca
- Matches: 242
- Goals: 720 (2.98 per match)
- Top goalscorer: Matt Derbyshire (23 goals)
- Biggest home win: Apollon 6–0 Pafos (2 December 2017); APOEL 7–1 Ethnikos (6 February 2018)
- Biggest away win: Doxa 0–8 APOEL (14 January 2018)
- Highest scoring: Doxa 0–8 APOEL (14 January 2018); APOEL 7–1 Ethnikos (6 February 2018); Doxa 2–6 Nea Salamina (10 March 2018)
- Longest winning run: 7 matches APOEL; Apollon
- Longest unbeaten run: 21 matches Apollon
- Longest winless run: 24 matches Ethnikos
- Longest losing run: 11 matches Omonia
- All statistics correct as of 13 May 2018.

The 2017–18 Cypriot First Division was the 79th season of the Cypriot top-level football league. The season began on 19 August 2017 and is ended on 13 May 2018.

== Teams ==
=== Promotion and relegation (pre-season) ===
Anagennisi Deryneia and AEZ Zakakiou were relegated at the end of the first-phase of the 2016–17 season after finishing in the bottom two places of the table. They were joined by Karmiotissa, who finished at the bottom of the second-phase relegation group.

The relegated teams were replaced by 2016–17 Second Division champions Alki Oroklini, runners-up Pafos FC and third-placed team Olympiakos Nicosia.

=== Stadiums and locations ===
Locations of the 2017–18 Cypriot First Division teams.

Note: Table lists clubs in alphabetical order.

Team	Location	Stadium	Capacity
AEK	Larnaca	AEK Arena	7,400
AEL	Limassol	Tsirio Stadium	13,331
Alki	Oroklini, Larnaca	Ammochostos Stadium	5,500
Anorthosis	Famagusta	Antonis Papadopoulos Stadium	10,230
APOEL	Nicosia	GSP Stadium	22,859
Apollon	Limassol	Tsirio Stadium	13,331
Aris	Limassol	Tsirio Stadium	13,331
Doxa	Katokopia, Nicosia	Makario Stadium	16,000
Ermis	Aradippou, Larnaca	GSZ Stadium	13,032
Ethnikos	Achna, Famagusta	Dasaki Stadium	7,000
Nea Salamina	Famagusta	Ammochostos Stadium	5,500
Olympiakos	Nicosia	Makario Stadium	16,000
Omonia	Nicosia	GSP Stadium	22,859
Pafos	Paphos	Stelios Kyriakides Stadium	9,394

=== Personnel and kits ===
Note: Flags indicate national team as has been defined under FIFA eligibility rules. Players and Managers may hold more than one non-FIFA nationality.

Team	Head coach	Captain	Kit manufacturer	Shirt sponsor
AEK Larnaca	(Spain) Imanol Idiakez	(Spain) David Català	Puma	A.J.K.
AEL	(Bosnia and Herzegovina) Dušan Kerkez	(Cyprus) Marios Nicolaou	Nike	Kepaky
Alki	(Cyprus) Savvas Damianou	(Cyprus) Nicolas Manoli	Joma	Alexander College
Anorthosis	(Israel) Ronny Levy	(Brazil) João Victor	Nike	–
APOEL	(Portugal) Bruno Baltazar	(Cyprus) Nektarios Alexandrou	Nike	Pari-Match
Apollon	(Cyprus) Sofronis Avgousti	(Cyprus) Giorgos Vasiliou	Puma	Carabao
Aris	(Cyprus) Nicos Panayiotou	(Greece) Markos Maragoudakis	Nike	Europcar
Doxa	(Cyprus) Loukas Hadjiloukas	(Spain) Manuel Redondo	Nike	Victory Ammunition
Ermis Aradippou	(Cyprus) Kostas Kaiafas	(Ukraine) Yaroslav Martynyuk	Nike	Cablenet
Ethnikos Achna	(Cyprus) Panagiotis Engomitis	(Cyprus) Christos Poyiatzis	Legea	OPAP Cyprus
Nea Salamina	(Cyprus) Savvas Poursaitidis	(Bulgaria) Dimitar Makriev	GEMS	Vitex
Olympiakos Nicosia	(Serbia) Vesko Mihajlović	(Cyprus) Kyriacos Polykarpou	Nike	Moon Cocktail Bar
Omonia	(Denmark) Jesper Fredberg	(Cyprus) Demetris Christofi	Puma	DIMCO
Pafos FC	(Scotland) Steven Pressley	(Cyprus) Charalambos Demosthenous	Jako	Korantina Homes

=== Managerial changes ===
Team	Outgoing manager	Manner of departure	Date of vacancy	Position in table	Incoming manager	Date of appointment
Ethnikos Achna	(Lithuania) Valdas Ivanauskas	Sacked	18 May 2017	Pre-season	(Cyprus) Panagiotis Engomitis	4 July 2017
APOEL	(Netherlands) Mario Been	Sacked	27 July 2017	Pre-season	(Greece) Georgios Donis	28 July 2017
Aris Limassol	(Cyprus) Nikolas Martides	Sacked	3 October 2017	13th	(Greece) Giannis Christopoulos	3 October 2017
Nea Salamina	(Cyprus) Liasos Louka	Sacked	18 October 2017	12th	(Cyprus) Savvas Poursaitidis	18 October 2017
Ermis Aradippou	(Cyprus) Nicos Panayiotou	Sacked	7 November 2017	10th	(Serbia) Goran Milojević	7 November 2017
Ethnikos Achna	(Cyprus) Panagiotis Engomitis	Sacked	12 November 2017	14th	(Georgia (country)) Giorgi Chikhradze	13 November 2017
Omonia	(Cyprus) Pambos Christodoulou	Sacked	5 December 2017	7th	(Bulgaria) Ivaylo Petev	14 December 2017
Ermis Aradippou	(Serbia) Goran Milojević	Sacked	22 December 2017	10th	(Cyprus) Kostas Kaiafas	23 December 2017
Aris Limassol	(Greece) Giannis Christopoulos	Sacked	22 January 2018	13th	(Cyprus) Nicos Panayiotou	22 January 2018
Pafos	(Slovenia) Luka Elsner	Sacked	21 January 2018	10th	(Scotland) Steven Pressley	31 January 2018
Ethnikos Achna	(Georgia (country)) Giorgi Chikhradze	Sacked	19 January 2018	14th	(Cyprus) Panagiotis Engomitis	1 February 2018
AEL Limassol	(Portugal) Bruno Baltazar	Resigned	5 March 2018	5th	(Bosnia and Herzegovina) Dušan Kerkez	7 March 2018
Olympiakos Nicosia	(Cyprus) Chrysis Michael	Sacked	19 March 2018	12th	(Serbia) Vesko Mihajlović	24 March 2018
Omonia	(Bulgaria) Ivaylo Petev	Sacked	21 March 2018	6th	(Denmark) Jesper Fredberg	22 March 2018
APOEL	(Greece) Georgios Donis	Sacked	22 March 2018	2nd	(Portugal) Bruno Baltazar	22 March 2018
Olympiakos Nicosia	(Serbia) Vesko Mihajlović	Resigned	24 April 2018	12th	(Cyprus) Kyriacos Polykarpou	29 April 2018

== Regular season ==
=== League table ===
Pos	Team	Pld	W	D	L	GF	GA	GD	Pts	Qualification or relegation
1	APOEL	26	20	3	3	72	25	+47	63	Qualification for the Championship round
2	Apollon Limassol	26	18	7	1	67	15	+52	61	Qualification for the Championship round
3	Anorthosis Famagusta	26	16	8	2	41	17	+24	56	Qualification for the Championship round
4	AEK Larnaca	26	16	5	5	57	24	+33	53	Qualification for the Championship round
5	AEL Limassol	26	14	6	6	35	17	+18	48	Qualification for the Championship round
6	Omonia	26	13	5	8	51	38	+13	44	Qualification for the Championship round
7	Doxa Katokopias	26	10	4	12	35	40	−5	34	Qualification for the Relegation round
8	Ermis Aradippou	26	9	3	14	35	49	−14	30	Qualification for the Relegation round
9	Pafos FC	26	6	8	12	23	38	−15	26	Qualification for the Relegation round
10	Nea Salamis Famagusta	26	6	6	14	28	46	−18	24	Qualification for the Relegation round
11	Alki Oroklini	26	6	5	15	30	57	−27	23	Qualification for the Relegation round
12	Olympiakos Nicosia	26	4	8	14	22	55	−33	20	Qualification for the Relegation round
13	Aris Limassol (R)	26	3	7	16	19	49	−30	16	Relegation to the Cypriot Second Division
14	Ethnikos Achna (R)	26	1	5	20	19	64	−45	8	Relegation to the Cypriot Second Division

Source: CFA (in Greek)
Rules for classification: 1) Points; 2) Head-to-head points; 3) Head-to-head goal difference; 4) Head-to-head goals scored; 5) Head-to-head away goals scored (only if two teams); 6) Goal difference; 7) Goals scored; 8) Play-off (only if deciding championship round, relegation round or relegation).
(R) Relegated

=== Results ===
Home \ Away	AEK	AEL	ALK	ANO	APOE	APOL	ARI	DOX	ERM	ETH	NSL	OLY	OMO	PAF
AEK Larnaca	—	1–0	2–1	1–1	3–1	1–1	4–1	4–0	1–1	6–1	2–0	2–0	5–0	2–0
AEL Limassol	0–0	—	3–0	0–1	0–0	1–1	1–0	1–0	1–0	3–0	3–1	3–0	2–3	0–1
Alki Oroklini	0–1	2–4	—	0–1	0–1	1–4	3–3	0–5	3–4	2–1	0–4	1–1	0–3	2–1
Anorthosis Famagusta	3–1	1–1	2–1	—	0–3	1–1	1–0	2–0	4–0	3–1	1–0	5–1	1–2	0–0
APOEL	3–1	2–1	4–0	0–1	—	0–4	5–2	2–0	2–1	7–1	2–1	6–1	2–1	4–0
Apollon Limassol	2–0	1–1	5–1	1–1	1–2	—	1–0	4–2	4–2	3–0	5–0	5–0	1–0	6–0
Aris Limassol	0–5	1–2	0–0	0–2	0–0	0–1	—	1–0	0–2	2–1	1–1	0–1	2–2	0–6
Doxa Katokopias	1–3	0–0	0–1	0–0	0–8	0–2	2–1	—	2–1	4–2	4–1	3–1	1–2	1–1
Ermis Aradippou	0–4	0–1	3–2	1–2	0–4	0–6	4–1	1–2	—	2–0	2–1	4–0	2–1	2–0
Ethnikos Achna	0–3	0–1	0–1	1–2	1–1	1–4	0–4	0–4	0–0	—	0–3	1–2	2–2	3–0
Nea Salamis Famagusta	1–0	0–3	2–3	1–1	1–4	0–0	2–0	0–1	1–1	0–0	—	2–0	1–3	3–0
Olympiakos	1–2	1–2	0–3	0–3	2–3	1–1	0–0	0–0	2–1	3–2	1–1	—	2–3	0–0
Omonia Nicosia	5–2	1–0	2–2	1–1	1–3	0–1	3–0	1–3	3–0	2–1	5–1	1–1	—	3–0
Pafos FC	1–1	0–1	1–1	0–1	2–3	0–2	0–0	1–0	2–1	0–0	4–0	1–1	2–1	—

Source: Cyprus Football Association (in Greek)
Legend: Blue = home team win; Yellow = draw; Red = away team win.
For upcoming matches, an "a" indicates there is an article about the rivalry between the two participants.

=== Positions by Round ===
The table lists the positions of teams after each week of matches. In order to preserve chronological progress, any postponed matches are not included in the round at which they were originally scheduled, but added to the full round they were played immediately afterwards. For example, if a match is scheduled for matchday 13, but then postponed and played between days 16 and 17, it will be added to the standings for day 16.

Qualification to Championship round
Qualification to Relegation round
Relegation to 2018–19 Cypriot Second Division

Team \ Round	1	2	3	4	5	6	7	8	9	10	11	12	13	14	15	16	17	18	19	20	21	22	23	24	25	26
APOEL	8	10	6	9	11	8	4	7	8	8	8	6	3	3	4	4	4	3	4	1	2	1	1	1	1	1
Apollon	9	11	11	7	8	5	7	5	7	5	4	4	5	5	3	3	3	4	3	2	1	2	2	2	2	2
Anorthosis	3	1	1	1	1	1	1	1	1	2	1	1	2	2	2	1	2	2	1	4	3	3	4	3	3	3
AEK	7	4	2	2	2	2	2	2	2	1	2	2	1	1	1	2	1	1	2	3	4	4	3	4	4	4
AEL	1	5	3	4	5	4	5	8	5	4	3	3	4	4	5	5	5	5	5	5	5	5	5	5	5	5
Omonia	11	12	8	11	3	7	9	6	4	6	5	7	7	7	8	8	7	7	6	6	6	6	6	6	6	6
Doxa	5	2	5	3	4	3	6	4	6	7	6	8	8	8	6	6	6	6	7	7	7	7	7	7	7	7
Ermis	10	13	14	14	14	14	11	11	10	11	10	10	9	10	10	10	11	11	10	10	9	8	8	8	8	8
Pafos	12	14	13	8	9	6	3	3	3	3	7	5	6	6	7	7	8	8	8	8	10	10	9	9	9	9
Nea Salamina	4	7	10	13	10	11	12	12	12	12	12	13	13	13	12	12	12	12	13	12	11	11	11	11	11	10
Alki	2	6	4	5	6	10	8	10	11	10	11	12	10	9	9	9	9	9	9	9	8	9	10	10	10	11
Olympiakos	6	9	9	6	7	9	10	9	9	9	9	9	11	11	11	11	10	10	11	11	12	12	12	12	12	12
Aris	13	8	12	12	13	12	14	14	13	13	13	11	12	12	13	13	13	13	12	13	13	13	13	13	13	13
Ethnikos	14	3	7	10	12	13	13	13	14	14	14	14	14	14	14	14	14	14	14	14	14	14	14	14	14	14

== Championship round ==
=== Championship round table ===
Pos	Team	Pld	W	D	L	GF	GA	GD	Pts	Qualification
1	APOEL (C)	36	27	5	4	92	35	+57	86	Qualification for the Champions League first qualifying round
2	Apollon Limassol	36	25	7	4	90	26	+64	82	Qualification for the Europa League first qualifying round
3	Anorthosis Famagusta	36	19	12	5	53	29	+24	69	Qualification for the Europa League first qualifying round
4	AEK Larnaca	36	20	8	8	74	39	+35	68	Qualification for the Europa League second qualifying round (Note: AEK Larnaca qualified for the Europa League second qualifying round by winning the 2017–18 Cypriot Cup.)
5	AEL Limassol	36	17	7	12	47	38	+9	58	
6	Omonia	36	14	5	17	58	60	−2	47	

Source: CFA (in Greek)
Rules for classification: 1) Points; 2) Head-to-head points; 3) Head-to-head goal difference; 4) Head-to-head goals scored; 5) Head-to-head away goals scored (only if two teams); 6) Goal difference; 7) Goals scored; 8) Play-off (only if deciding champion or UEFA competitions).
(C) Champions

=== Results ===
Home \ Away	AEK	AEL	ANO	APOE	APOL	OMO
AEK Larnaca	—	3–2	2–2	1–3	3–0	2–0
AEL Limassol	3–2	—	0–2	1–2	0–2	2–1
Anorthosis Famagusta	1–1	0–0	—	0–0	1–2	2–1
APOEL	0–0	3–1	2–1	—	2–1	4–1
Apollon Limassol	3–0	5–1	3–1	4–2	—	3–0
Omonia Nicosia	1–3	1–2	1–2	0–2	1–0	—

Source: Cyprus Football Association
Legend: Blue = home team win; Yellow = draw; Red = away team win.
For upcoming matches, an "a" indicates there is an article about the rivalry between the two participants.

=== Positions by Round ===
The table lists the positions of teams after each week of matches.

Qualification to Champions League first qualifying round
Qualification to Europa League first qualifying round

Team \ Round	27	28	29	30	31	32	33	34	35	36
APOEL	1	2	2	2	2	2	2	1	1	1
Apollon	2	1	1	1	1	1	1	2	2	2
Anorthosis	3	3	3	3	3	3	3	3	3	3
AEK	4	4	4	4	4	4	4	4	4	4
AEL	5	5	5	5	5	5	5	5	5	5
Omonia	6	6	6	6	6	6	6	6	6	6

== Relegation round ==
=== Relegation round table ===
Pos	Team	Pld	W	D	L	GF	GA	GD	Pts	Relegation
7	Nea Salamis Famagusta	36	14	6	16	53	55	−2	48	
8	Ermis Aradippou	36	14	4	18	50	64	−14	46 (Note: Head to head record: Doxa 2–1 Ermis, Ermis 1–2 Doxa, Doxa 2–3 Ermis, Ermis 2–1 Doxa.)	
9	Doxa Katokopias	36	14	4	18	54	63	−9	46	
10	Pafos FC	36	11	9	16	36	51	−15	42	
11	Alki Oroklini	36	11	6	19	48	73	−25	39	
12	Olympiakos Nicosia (R)	36	5	9	22	34	81	−47	24	Relegation to the Cypriot Second Division

Source: CFA
Rules for classification: 1) Points; 2) Head-to-head points; 3) Head-to-head goal difference; 4) Head-to-head goals scored; 5) Head-to-head away goals scored (only if two teams); 6) Goal difference; 7) Goals scored; 8) Play-off (only if deciding champion or UEFA competitions).
(R) Relegated

=== Results ===
Home \ Away	ALK	DOX	ERM	OLY	NSL	PAF
Alki Oroklini	—	1–3	2–3	3–1	1–0	3–0
Doxa Katokopias	4–3	—	2–3	5–0	2–6	0–3
Ermis Aradippou	0–1	2–1	—	3–2	0–1	0–1
Olympiakos	0–3	0–1	3–3	—	0–2	3–0
Nea Salamis Famagusta	4–0	4–1	2–0	3–1	—	1–3
Pafos FC	1–1	1–0	0–1	3–2	1–2	—

Source: Cyprus Football Association
Legend: Blue = home team win; Yellow = draw; Red = away team win.
For upcoming matches, an "a" indicates there is an article about the rivalry between the two participants.

=== Positions by Round ===
The table lists the positions of teams after each week of matches.

Relegation to 2018–19 Cypriot Second Division

Team \ Round	27	28	29	30	31	32	33	34	35	36
Nea Salamina	11	11	10	9	10	9	9	9	8	7
Ermis	8	8	8	8	8	8	8	7	9	8
Doxa	7	7	7	7	7	7	7	8	7	9
Pafos	9	10	11	11	11	11	11	11	11	10
Alki	10	9	9	10	9	10	10	10	10	11
Olympiakos	12	12	12	12	12	12	12	12	12	12

== Season statistics ==
=== Top scorers ===
As of 13 May 2018

Rank	Player	Club	Goals
1	(England) Matt Derbyshire	Omonia	23
1	(Netherlands) Hector Havel	AEK Larnaca	23
2	(Brazil) Fabrício	Alki	20
3	(Finland) Berat Sadik	Doxa	18
4	(Argentina) Emilio Zelaya	Apollon	17
5	(Croatia) Anton Maglica	Apollon	16
6	(Belgium) Igor de Camargo	APOEL	15
6	(Greece) Fotios Papoulis	Apollon	15
7	(North Macedonia) Ivan Tričkovski	AEK Larnaca	11
7	(Spain) Acorán	AEK Larnaca	11
7	(Benin) Mickaël Poté	APOEL	11
7	(Slovakia) Michal Ďuriš	Anorthosis	11

=== Hat-tricks ===
#	Player	For	Against	Result	Date
1.	(Austria) Nils Zatl	Doxa	Alki	5–0	21 October 2017
2.	(Guinea) Demba Camara	Anorthosis	Olympiakos	5–1	4 November 2017
3.	(Argentina) Emilio Zelaya	Apollon	Ermis	6–0	21 December 2017
4.	(France) Florian Taulemesse	AEK	Aris	4–1	13 January 2018
5.	(Cyprus) Georgios Efrem	APOEL	Doxa	8–0	14 January 2018
6.	(Brazil) Fabrício Simões	Alki	Ermis	3–4	30 January 2018
7.	(England) Matt Derbyshire	Omonia	Nea Salamina	5–1	30 January 2018
8.	(Austria) Daniel Sikorski	Pafos FC	Aris Limassol	6–0	6 February 2018
9.	(Curaçao) Boy Deul	Pafos FC	Aris Limassol	6–0	6 February 2018
10.	(Brazil) Luís Carlos	Doxa	Olympiakos	5–0	14 April 2018
11.	(Croatia) Anton Maglica	Apollon	Anorthosis	3–0	23 April 2018

=== Scoring ===
- First goal of the season: 73 minutes and 36 seconds – (France) Chafik Tigroudja (Alki) against Ethnikos (19 August 2017)
- Fastest goal of the season: 0 minutes and 13 seconds – (Benin) Mickaël Poté (APOEL) against Anorthosis (20 December 2017)
- Latest goal of the season: 97 minutes and 20 seconds – (Argentina) Emilio Zelaya (Apollon) against Ermis (18 September 2017)
- First scored penalty kick of the season: 81 minutes and 27 seconds – (Portugal) Tiago Gomes (Doxa) against Ermis (27 August 2017)
- First own goal of the season: 86 minutes and 25 seconds – (Greece) Kiriakos Stratilatis (Alki) for Anorthosis (27 August 2017)
- Most goals scored in a match by one player: 3 goals
  - 9 players
- Most scored goals in a single fixture – 28 goals (Fixture 22)
  - Fixture 22 results: Olympiakos 1–2 AEL, Alki 3–4 Ermis, Omonia 5–1 Nea Salamina, Apollon 1–2 APOEL, Ethnikos 0–4 Aris, Pafos 0–1 Anorthosis, AEK 4–0 Doxa.
- Highest scoring game: 8 goals
  - Doxa 0–8 APOEL (14 January 2018)
  - APOEL 7–1 Ethnikos(6 February 2018)
- Largest winning margin: 8 goals
  - Doxa 0–8 APOEL (14 January 2018)
- Most goals scored in a match by a single team: 8 goals
  - Doxa 0–8 APOEL (14 January 2018)
- Most goals scored by a losing team: 3 goals
  - Alki 3–4 Ermis (30 January 2018)

=== Discipline ===
- First yellow card of the season: 26 minutes – (France) Jean-Baptiste Pierazzi for Alki against Ethnikos (19 August 2017)
- First red card of the season: 81 minutes – (Cameroon) Evariste Ngolok for Aris against Anorthosis (10 September 2017)
- Most yellow cards in a single match: 10
  - APOEL 2–1 AEL – 3 for APOEL (Lorenzo Ebecilio, Agustín Farías, Mickaël Poté) and 7 for AEL (Fidelis Irhene, Vozinha, Marco Soares, Dani Benítez, Andreas Avraam, Marco Airosa, Mesca) (17 January 2018)
  - Alki 3–3 Aris – 6 for Alki (Abdelaye Diakité, Yoann Tribeau, Willy Semedo, Jean-Baptiste Pierazzi, Fabrício Simões, Panagiotis Frageskou) and 4 for Aris (Edin Nuredinoski, Markos Maragoudakis, Vlatko Drobarov, Kyriakos Panagi) (17 September 2017)
  - AEK 1–1 Apollon – 5 for AEK (Tete, Florian Taulemesse, Marios Antoniades, David Català, Daniel Mojsov) and 5 for Apollon (Héctor Yuste, Valentin Roberge, Esteban Sachetti, Allan, Emilio Zelaya) (5 November 2017)
  - Omonia 5–1 Nea Salamina – 3 for Omonia (Hedwiges Maduro, Nicandro Breeveld, Demetris Christofi) and 7 for Nea Salamina (Andreas Karo, Anderson Correia, Carlão, Robert Veselovsky (2), David Poljanec, Taron Voskanyan) (30 January 2018)
  - APOEL FC 2–1 Omonia – 3 for APOEL (Roland Sallai, Emilio Nsue, Lorenzo Ebecilio) and 7 for Omonia (Jaílson, Matt Derbyshire, Mamadu Candé, William Soares, Loukas Vyntra, Kanu, Theophilus Solomon) (17 February 2018)
  - Apollon 5–1 AEL – 4 for Apollon (Alef, Esteban Sachetti, Fotios Papoulis, Anton Maglica) and 6 for AEL (Leandro Silva, David Texeira, Bogdan Mitrea, Dani Benítez, Marco Airosa, Kevin Lafrance) (3 March 2018)
- Most red cards in a single match: 2
  - Pafos 0–1 AEL – 1 for Pafos (Dmitri Torbinski) and 1 for AEL (Kevin Lafrance) (14 January 2018)

== Attendances ==
#	Club	Average
1	Omonoia	5,680
2	APOEL	5,293
3	Anorthosis	4,691
4	Apollon Limassol	3,621
5	AEK Larnaca	2,456
6	AEL	1,999
7	Nea Salamina	1,244
8	Pafos	1,135
9	Aris Limassol	819
10	Olympiakos Nicosia	807
11	Ermis	775
12	Alki	767
13	Ethnikos Achnas	746
14	Doxa Katokopias	477
