= Jaílson (footballer, born 1991) =

Brazilian footballer

Personal information
- Full name: Jaílson de Lima Araújo
- Date of birth: 21 January 1991 (age 35)
- Place of birth: Paraíba, Brazil
- Height: 1.70 m (5 ft 7 in)
- Position: Right-back

Team information
- Current team: Al-Minaa

Youth career
- 2012: CSP

Senior career*
Years	Team	Apps	(Gls)
2012−2014	CSP	0	(0)
2013–2018	Grêmio Anápolis	17	(0)
2013−2015	→ Paços de Ferreira (loan)	33	(0)
2015–2016	→ Arouca (loan)	13	(0)
2016−2017	→ Tondela (loan)	24	(3)
2017−2018	→ Omonia (loan)	30	(1)
2018−2019	Omonia	6	(0)
2019	Nea Salamina	11	(0)
2019−2021	Aves	17	(0)
2021	Paraná	5	(0)
2021−2022	POX	0	(0)
2022−2023	Al-Talaba		
2023–	Al-Minaa	0	(0)
- * Club domestic league appearances and goals as of 21 September 2019

Jaílson de Lima Araújo (born 21 January 1991) is a Brazilian professional footballer who plays as a right-back for Al-Minaa in Iraqi Professional League.

== Career ==
Born in Paraíba, Jaílson is a youth product of Centro Sportivo Paraibano. He spent his first year as professional, on a loan deal to Grêmio Anápolis, joining them on 12 December 2012. and competing in the Campeonato Goiano.

On 5 August 2013, Jaílson moved abroad and joined Paços de Ferreira on a loan deal. He was intended as a replacement for Sevilla bound, Diogo Figueiras.

He made his professional debut for Paços de Ferreira on 9 February 2014, in an away loss to FC Porto. and amassed 23 appearances during the season. On 30 June 2015, Araújo moved to Arouca as a replacement for Iván Balliu, signing a one-year deal. A year later, he signed another one-year deal, now with Tondela.

=== Omonia Nicosia ===
On 1 August 2017, Cypriot First Division club Omonia Nicosia announced the signing of Jailson. On 26 May 2018 Jailson officially became an Omonia Nicosia player after the team bought him from the club he was loaned from as a resold of his good appearances despite the bad season that the club had.

== Career statistics ==
As of match played 21 May 2019

Appearances and goals by club, season and competition
Club	Season	League		National cup		League cup		Total	
Club	Season	Apps	Goals	Apps	Goals	Apps	Goals	Apps	Goals
Paços de Ferreira	2013–14	10	0	0	0	2	0	12	0
Paços de Ferreira	2014–15	23	0	2	0	2	0	27	0
Paços de Ferreira	Total	33	0	2	0	4	0	39	0
Arouca	2015–16	13	0	1	0	0	0	14	0
Tondela	2016–17	24	3	0	0	0	0	24	3
Omonia (loan)	2017–18	30	1	2	0	—		32	1
Omonia	2018–19	6	0	0	0	—		6	0
Nea Salamina	2018–19	11	0	1	0	—		12	0
Career total		117	4	6	0	4	0	127	4
