= William Soares (footballer, born 1985) =

Brazilian footballer

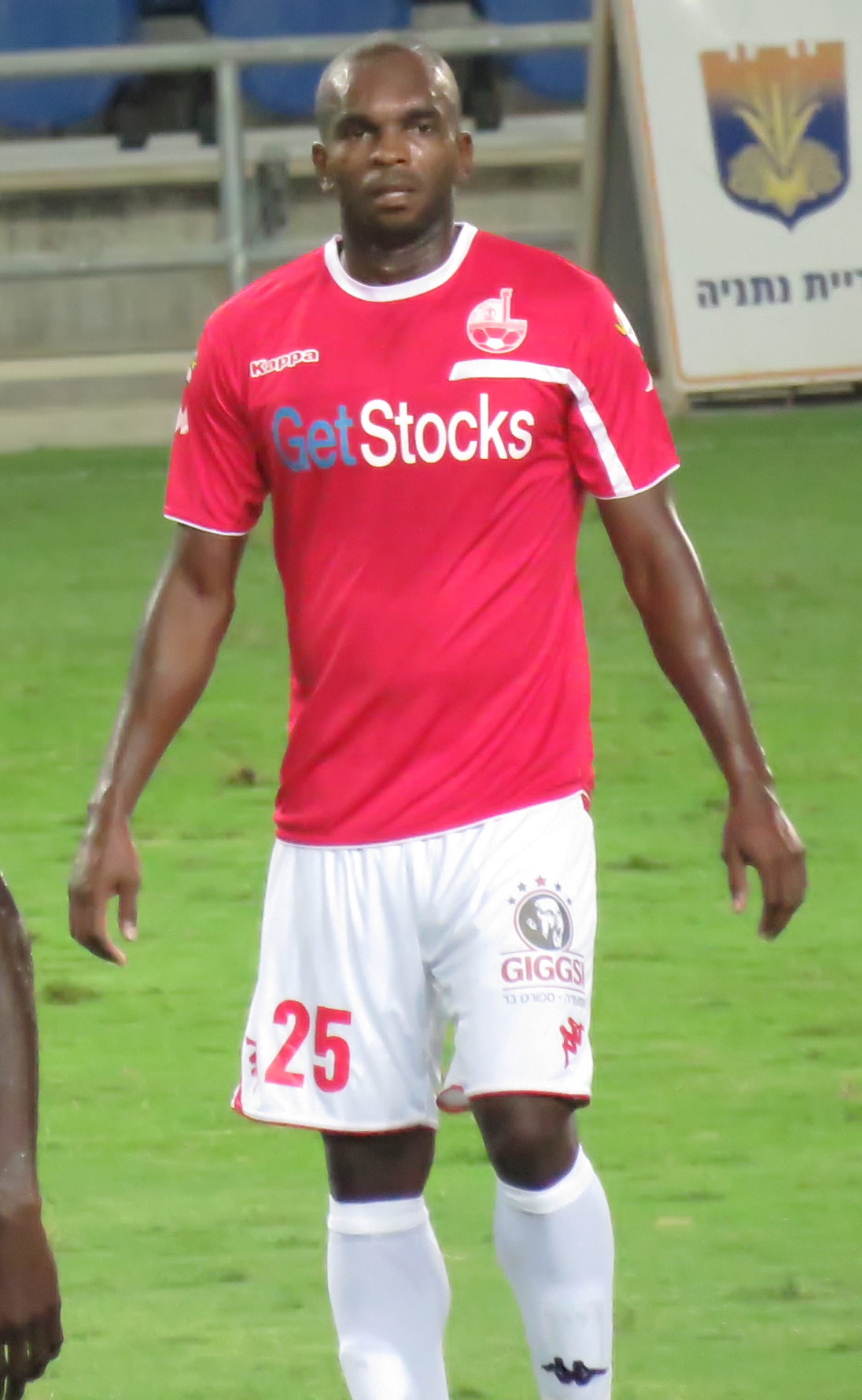

Personal information
- Full name: William Ribeiro Soares
- Date of birth: 7 February 1985 (age 41)
- Place of birth: Araporã, Brazil
- Height: 1.85 m (6 ft 1 in)
- Position: Center back

Youth career
- Itumbiara

Senior career*
Years	Team	Apps	(Gls)
2003–2004	São José-PA	0	(0)
2004–2007	Académica	0	(0)
2004–2005	→ Fátima (loan)	17	(0)
2005–2007	Braga	0	(0)
2005–2006	Braga B	12	(1)
2006–2007	→ Gil Vicente (loan)	2	(0)
2007–2008	Hakoah Amidar Ramat Gan	27	(1)
2008–2010	Hapoel Ramat Gan	46	(1)
2010–2016	Hapoel Be'er Sheva	195	(12)
2016–2017	Standard Liège	6	(0)
2017	Hapoel Be'er Sheva	7	(0)
2017–2018	Omonia	31	(2)
2018–2019	Académica	3	(0)
- * Club domestic league appearances and goals as of 19 May 2019

William Ribeiro Soares (born 7 February 1985) is a Brazilian footballer who plays as a center-back.

== Club career ==
On 31 August 2016, Soares signed a one-year contract with Belgian club Standard Liège, with an option to extend for an extra season.

On 25 January 2017, Soares returned to Hapoel Be'er Sheva.

On 29 July 2017, Cypriot First Division club Omonia Nicosia announced the signing of Soares. He made his debut on 10 September 2017 against Ethnikos Achna in the 2017–18 First Division.

After only one season in Cyprus, he returned to Portugal, with Académica.

== Club career statistics ==
(correct as of August 2015)

Only Israeli club career statistics

Club	Season	League	League			Cup			League Cup			Europe			Total		
Club	Season	League	Apps	Goals	Assists	Apps	Goals	Assists	Apps	Goals	Assists	Apps	Goals	Assists	Apps	Goals	Assists
Hakoah Ramat Gan	2007–2008	Israeli Premier League	27	1	0	3	0	0	7	1	0	0	0	0	37	2	0
Hapoel Ramat Gan	2008–2009	Israeli Premier League	29	0	0	1	0	0	9	2	0	0	0	0	39	2	0
Hapoel Ramat Gan	2009–2010	Israeli Premier League	17	1	0	0	0	0	5	0	0	0	0	0	22	1	0
Hapoel Be'er Sheva	2010	Israeli Premier League	12	0	0	2	0	0	0	0	0	0	0	0	14	0	0
Hapoel Be'er Sheva	2010–2011	Israeli Premier League	32	3	0	2	1	0	4	0	0	0	0	0	38	4	0
Hapoel Be'er Sheva	2011–2012	Israeli Premier League	35	1	1	2	0	0	2	0	0	0	0	0	39	1	1
Hapoel Be'er Sheva	2012–2013	Israeli Premier League	28	1	0	1	0	0	6	0	0	0	0	0	35	1	0
Hapoel Be'er Sheva	2013–2014	Israeli Premier League	30	2	0	3	0	1	0	0	0	0	0	0	33	2	0
Hapoel Be'er Sheva	2014–2015	Israeli Premier League	34	4	0	5	0	1	4	0	0	2	0	0	45	4	1
Hapoel Be'er Sheva	2015–2016	Israeli Premier League	1	0	0	0	0	0	3	0	0	2	0	0	6	0	0
Career		Israeli Premier League	245	13	1	19	1	2	40	3	0	4	0	0	308	17	3

== Honours ==
=== Club ===
Hapoel Be'er Sheva

- Premier League: 2015–16, 2016-17
