= Mamadu Candé =

Bissau-Guinean footballer (born 1990)

Personal information
- Full name: Muhammad Youssuf Candé
- Date of birth: 29 August 1990 (age 36)
- Place of birth: Cascais, Portugal
- Height: 1.80 m (5 ft 11 in)
- Position: Left-back

Team information
- Current team: Operário
- Number: 24

Youth career
- 2007–2009: Bissau

Senior career*
Years	Team	Apps	(Gls)
2008–2011	Dezembro	41	(1)
2011–2013	Aves	29	(0)
2013–2014	Videoton	3	(0)
2014–2016	Portimonense	54	(1)
2016	Tondela	12	(1)
2017–2018	Omonia	23	(3)
2018–2020	Santa Clara	37	(1)
2021	Radomiak Radom	0	(0)
2023	Estrela da Amadora	3	(0)
2023	Rabo de Peixe		
2023–	Operário		

International career
2010–2019	Guinea-Bissau	23	(0)
- * Club domestic league appearances and goals as of 29 August 2024

Muhammad "Mamadu" Youssuf Candé (born 29 August 1990) is a Guinea-Bissauan professional footballer who plays as a left-back for Operário.

== Club career ==
On 18 June 2021, Candé signed with Estrela da Amadora.

== International career ==
Candé played at 2019 Africa Cup of Nations.

== Career statistics ==
As of 10 June 2018

Appearances and goals by club, season and competition
Club	Season	League		National cup		League cup		Europe		Total	
Club	Season	Apps	Goals	Apps	Goals	Apps	Goals	Apps	Goals	Apps	Goals
Dezembro	2009–10	18	0	0	0	0	0	–		18	0
Dezembro	2010–11	23	1	0	0	0	0	–		23	1
Dezembro	Total	41	1	0	0	0	0	–		41	1
Aves	2011–12	1	0	0	0	2	0	–		3	0
Aves	2012–13	28	0	2	0	3	0	–		33	0
Aves	Total	29	0	2	0	5	0	–		36	0
Videoton	2013–14	3	0	3	0	11	0	1	0	18	0
Portimonense	2014–15	29	0	0	0	0	0	–		29	0
Portimonense	2015–16	25	1	1	0	2	1	–		28	2
Portimonense	Total	54	1	1	0	2	1	–		57	2
Tondela	2016–17	12	1	1	0	0	0	–		13	1
Omonia	2017–18	23	3	1	0	–	–	–		24	3
Career total		162	6	8	0	18	1	1	0	189	7
