= Róbert Veselovský =

Slovak footballer (born 1985)

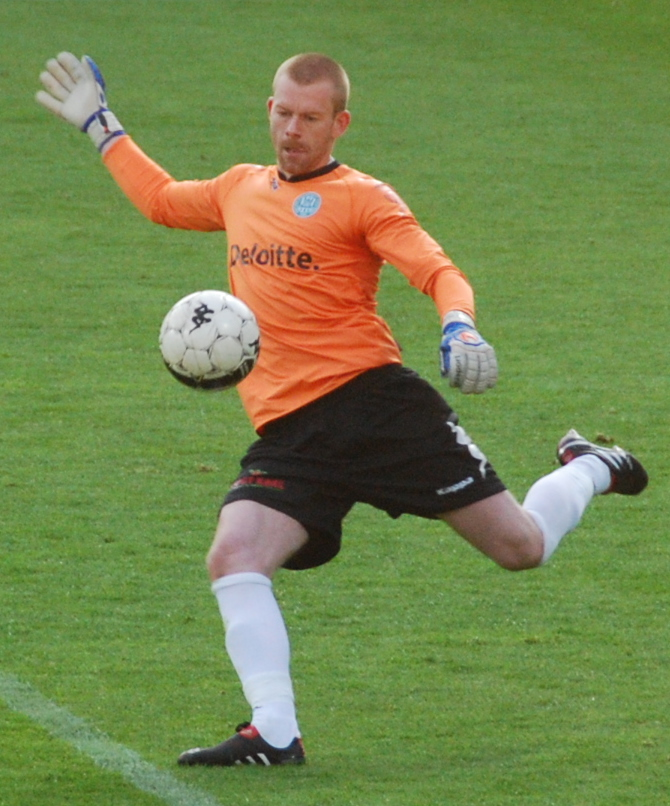
- Veselovský in 2011

Personal information
- Date of birth: 2 September 1985 (age 41)
- Place of birth: Nitra, Czechoslovakia
- Height: 1.86 m (6 ft 1 in)
- Position: Goalkeeper

Youth career
- 1992–2003: Nitra
- 2003–2005: Slovácko

Senior career*
Years	Team	Apps	(Gls)
2004–2005	→ Slovan Bratislava (loan)	0	(0)
2005	Slovácko	0	(0)
2006–2008	Östers IF	41	(0)
2008	→ Viborg (loan)	8	(0)
2008	→ Haugesund (loan)	9	(0)
2009–2011	Viborg	83	(0)
2012–2013	Horsens	5	(0)
2013–2015	Universitatea Cluj	49	(0)
2015–2016	Mladá Boleslav	10	(0)
2016–2021	Nea Salamis Famagusta	124	(0)
2021–2022	Enosis Neon Paralimni	0	(0)
2023–	AC Nitra		
- * Club domestic league appearances and goals

Róbert Veselovský (born 2 September 1985) is a Slovak former professional footballer who currently plays as a goalkeeper for amateur side AC Nitra.

== Career ==
Veselovský started playing football in his hometown, at Nitra. At the age of eighteen, he joined 1. FC Slovácko and one year later he was loaned to Slovan Bratislava. In 2006 Veselovský transferred to the Swedish team Östers IF. He played there until 2008, relegating from Allsvenskan to Swedish Football Division 1. In 2013 to 2015 he played for Universitatea Cluj.

On the first of February 2008 Veselovský was loaned by the Danish Viborg FF as a backup solution for John Alvbåge and Kristian Kirk. He played eight matches in the 2007–08 Danish Superliga before being loaned again to the Norwegian side, Haugesund. On 26 January 2009 Veselovský returned to the second division team, Viborg FF with whom he signed a three-year contract. He was named the team's player of the year in 2010 and 2011.

On 18 November 2011, Veselovský signed a two-and-a-half-year contract with the Danish first division side AC Horsens. He had not gotten real playing time because of Frederik Rønnow's breakthrough and left the club in June 2013.

In September 2013 Veselovský was transferred by the Romanian first league Universitatea Cluj after being tested in two friendly matches. He played 24 matches and helped his team to avoid the relegation. In 2014, he signed a new contract with Universitatea Cluj, despite Steaua București's interest on him.

After another year at FC Universitatea Cluj, where he played the first Cup Final for the club in 50 years, Veselovský signed for FK Mladá Boleslav as a free agent.

In 2016, he joined Cypriot First Division club Nea Salamis Famagusta.
