= Kristian Kirk =

Danish footballer (born 1986)

Personal information
- Date of birth: July 30, 1986 (age 40)
- Place of birth: Denmark
- Height: 1.93 m (6 ft 4 in)
- Position: Goalkeeper

Youth career
- Nors BK
- Thisted FC
- AaB

Senior career*
Years	Team	Apps	(Gls)
2003–2005	Jetsmark IF		
2005–2011	Viborg FF	15	(0)
2012–2013	Thisted FC	0	(0)
2013–2014	Næsby BK		
- * Club domestic league appearances and goals as of 20 March 2012

Kristian Kirk (born 30 July 1986) is a Danish former professional football goalkeeper, who last played for Næsby BK. He has played one game for Viborg in the Danish Superliga championship in May 2008.
