= Savvas Damianou =

Cypriot football manager

Personal information
- Date of birth: 22 May 1979 (age 47)

Managerial career
- Years: Team
- 2015–2018: Alki Oroklini
- 2018–2019: Cyprus U19
- 2019–2020: Cyprus U21
- 2020-2021: Nea Salamis Famagusta

Savvas Damianou (born 22 May 1979) is a Cypriot football manager.

== Alki Oroklini ==
In 2015, he took on his first managerial appointment with Alki Oroklini.
