= Matt Derbyshire =

English footballer (born 1986)

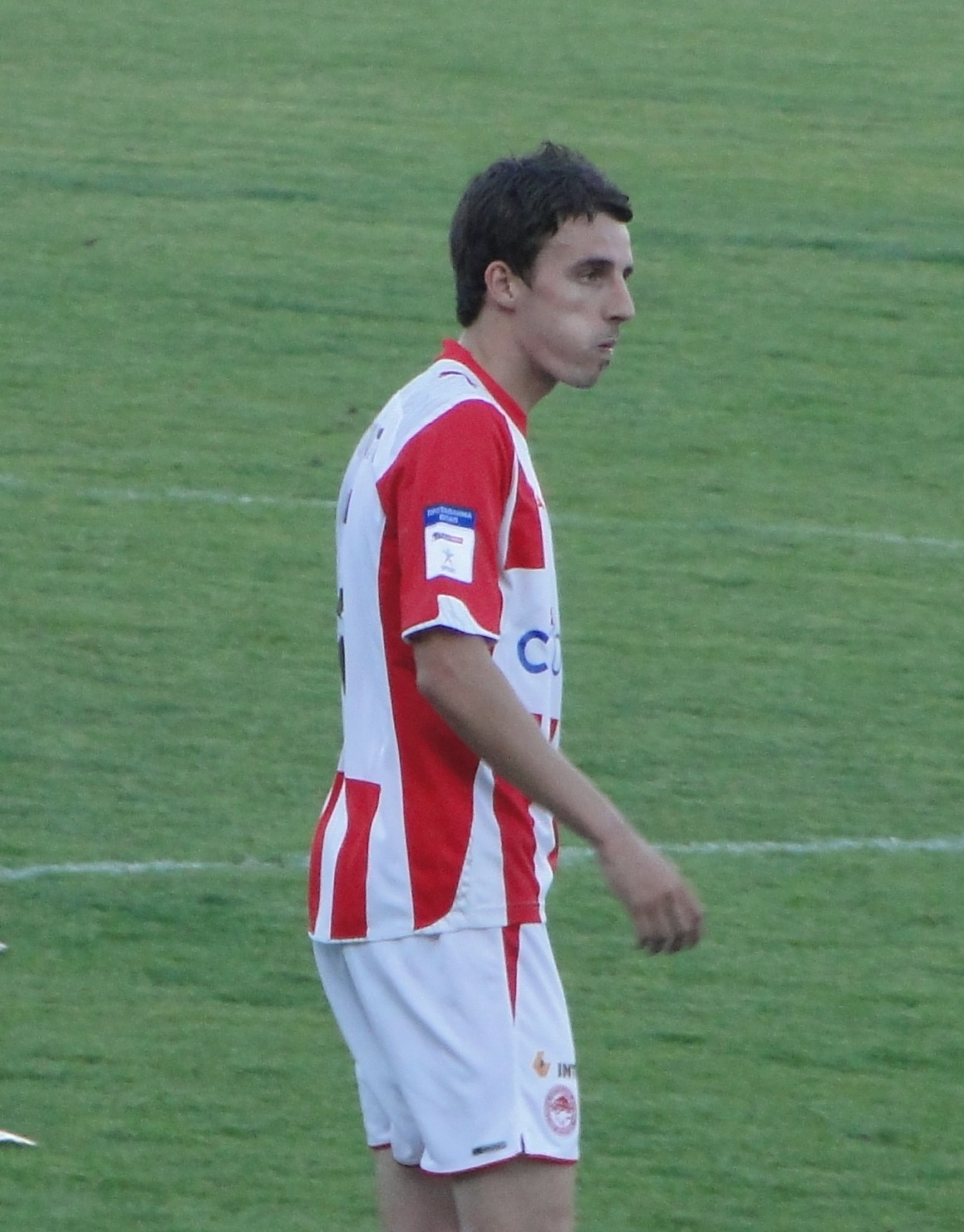
- Derbyshire playing for Olympiacos in 2010

Personal information
- Full name: Matthew Anthony Derbyshire
- Date of birth: 14 April 1986 (age 40)
- Place of birth: Blackburn, England
- Height: 5 ft 10 in (1.78 m)
- Position: Striker

Youth career
- –2002: Darwen

Senior career*
Years	Team	Apps	(Gls)
2002–2003	Great Harwood Town	31	(21)
2003–2009	Blackburn Rovers	63	(10)
2004–2005	→ Plymouth Argyle (loan)	12	(0)
2005–2006	→ Wrexham (loan)	16	(10)
2009	→ Olympiacos (loan)	7	(5)
2009–2011	Olympiacos	14	(6)
2010–2011	→ Birmingham City (loan)	13	(0)
2011–2014	Nottingham Forest	44	(8)
2012	→ Oldham Athletic (loan)	18	(4)
2013	→ Blackpool (loan)	12	(0)
2014–2016	Rotherham United	69	(17)
2016–2020	Omonia	113	(62)
2020–2021	Macarthur FC	25	(14)
2021–2022	AEK Larnaca	21	(5)
2022–2023	NorthEast United	8	(1)
2023–2024	Bradford City	20	(1)
Total		482	(164)

International career
2007–2009	England U21	14	(4)
- * Club domestic league appearances and goals

Matthew Anthony Derbyshire (born 14 April 1986) is an English former footballer.

He began his career with non-League side Great Harwood Town before earning himself a move to local Premier League team Blackburn Rovers in 2003. He played for Blackburn for five years, and had loan spells with Plymouth Argyle, Wrexham and Olympiacos, before joining the latter club on a permanent basis in 2009. Whilst at Olympiacos, Derbyshire won the Super League Greece and Greek Cup. He returned to England in 2010 with Birmingham City, and continued with spells at Nottingham Forest, Oldham Athletic, Blackpool and Rotherham United. He spent four seasons in Cyprus with Omonia followed by one season with A-League club Macarthur FC before returning to Cyprus with AEK Larnaca. He joined NorthEast United in 2022. He spent two seasons with Bradford City before retiring from football in November 2024.

He won 14 caps for England at under-21 level.

== Club career ==
=== Early life and career ===
Derbyshire was born in Great Harwood, Lancashire and attended Our Lady and St John R.C. High School in Blackburn. He played football as a youngster for Darwen before joining Great Harwood Town in 2002. He scored his first goal for the club's first team as a 16-year-old, in October 2002, attracting interest from Accrington Stanley and Radcliffe Borough who took him on trial in pre-season 2003. By the time he left Great Harwood in November 2003, he had scored 26, of which 21 had come in the North West Counties League, and 18 in his last nine appearances.

=== Blackburn Rovers ===
Derbyshire joined Blackburn Rovers in November 2003 for a £20,000 fee, a club record for Great Harwood. He had previously worked in Rovers' community department, coaching young children. He rejected a move to Manchester United in favour of Blackburn, whom he had supported since he was a child. He progressed through the youth and reserve teams, and his performances earned him the Supporters' Young Player of the Year award for the 2004–05 season. Derbyshire made his first-team debut as a late substitute in the Premiership defeat at home to Fulham on 7 May 2005.

He joined Championship club Plymouth Argyle on 30 August 2005 on loan for the season; a few days later, manager Bobby Williamson was sacked. Derbyshire made his debut as a substitute in caretaker Jocky Scott's first match in charge, and started the next three, after which Tony Pulis was appointed manager and Derbyshire made nine more appearances but no more starts. The loan was ended early, and on the advice of Blackburn manager Mark Hughes, he began another loan, an initial month at League Two club Wrexham. He scored five goals in as many games, the loan was extended to three months, and he ended up with ten goals from 16 league matches and a new two-year contract with Blackburn.

Derbyshire opened his senior goal account for Blackburn in a 3–0 win against Wigan Athletic on 1 January 2007 before extending his tally further with the opener away to Everton in a 4–1 FA Cup third-round victory six days later. He made his first Premiership start against Arsenal on 13 January, and scored his third goal in four games against Manchester City. His form continued the following week with two goals and an assist away to Luton Town in the FA Cup fourth round. He also scored against Manchester United, taking advantage of a defensive error to give Blackburn Rovers a 1–0 lead, although they went on to lose the match 4–1. He finished his first Premier League season with 9 goals in all competitions, from 14 starts and 16 substitute appearances.

In the 2007–08 season, Derbyshire scored in the first match of the season, against Middlesbrough, coming on as a substitute to score the winner in a 2–1 victory. On 1 March 2008, he scored a 90th-minute winner against Newcastle United, and again scored a late winner, against Fulham on 20 September, finishing off a move involving Tugay, Carlos Villanueva and Roque Santa Cruz.

=== Olympiacos ===
He found starts hard to come by under new manager Paul Ince and played little after the arrival of his successor Sam Allardyce, and in late January 2009, Derbyshire joined Olympiacos on loan until the end of the 2008–09 Super League season. He made his first appearance for the club as a substitute in the first leg of a Greek Cup match at PAOK's Toumba Stadium. In the return match, his home debut, Derbyshire scored a goal in extra time, securing progress to the semi-finals.

He made his league debut on 14 February in a 2–1 home victory over Aris as a 79th-minute substitute for Diogo. On 15 March, he scored his first goal in a 5–0 win over Iraklis with his first touch of the ball after coming on for Luciano Galletti in the 81st minute, adding his second goal (and Olympiacos' fifth) just five minutes later. The following week he started the match against Panionios and played the whole 90 minutes, scoring in a 2–3 away win.

Derbyshire played a pivotal role in the Greek Cup final against cross-city rivals AEK Athens. With Olympiacos 2–0 down, he was brought on at half-time; three minutes later, he scored. The game then went to 2–2 before AEK Athens scored what seemed to be the winning goal in stoppage time. However, with the last touch of the game, Derbyshire headed an equaliser in the sixth minute of added time, bringing the score to 3–3, after having suffered a broken nose and suspected concussion following a clash with an opponent. He stated afterwards that he realised he had scored from the cheers of fans. Olympiacos went on to win the match 15–14 on penalties, and Derbyshire received the Man of the match award for his efforts. He signed a four-year contract with Olympiacos on 23 June 2009 after the clubs agreed a fee reported as £3m.

On 21 March 2010, Derbyshire scored the winning goal against Panathinaikos, in a 1–0 away victory, and was instantly nicknamed The English Killer by the Greek media.

In August 2010, the team's new coach, Ernesto Valverde, told Derbyshire that he was not part of his plans for the 2010–11 season, so he should search for a new team.

==== Birmingham loan ====
Derbyshire returned to England when he signed for Birmingham City on 16 August 2010 on loan for the 2010–11 Premier League season, with a possibility of the deal being made permanent at the end of that time. He made his debut against former club Blackburn Rovers on 21 August as a second-half substitute for fellow new signing Nikola Žigić, and scored his first goal for the club five days later in a 3–2 League Cup victory over Rochdale. After waiting until January 2011 for his first Premier League start for Birmingham, against Blackpool, he then scored twice in the 4–1 win at Millwall in the third round of the FA Cup. Derbyshire never established himself in the first team, and despite making five appearances in that season's League Cup competition, he was omitted from Birmingham's squad for the final, in which Birmingham achieved a shock 2–1 victory against Arsenal. He left the club at the end of the season after their relegation from the Premier League.

=== Nottingham Forest ===
Derbyshire signed a three-year contract with Championship club Nottingham Forest on 10 August 2011. The fee was undisclosed. He was issued squad number eight. Upon signing, Derbyshire stated the importance to his career of getting regular first team football again. At Forest, Derbyshire renewed acquaintance with assistant manager Rob Kelly, who was his coach when he was a youth player at Blackburn Rovers. Derbyshire made his debut for Forest on 16 August in a 1–0 away win against Doncaster Rovers. His first and only goal in the 2011–12 season was the opener in a 3–2 away defeat to Southampton.

On 14 September 2012 Derbyshire went on loan to League One club Oldham Athletic in a short-term deal. He scored on his debut a day later, scoring in a 2–2 draw at home to Notts County. He scored again in the following game, earning a point for Oldham in a 1–1 draw against Scunthorpe United. Derbyshire's third goal for Oldham came in a 2–0 away win over Crewe Alexandra. He scored again in a 2–0 win at home to Leyton Orient, but the goal was controversial as Orient manager Russell Slade accused Derbyshire of a "blatant" handball offence that the referee did not see. Manager Paul Dickov then stated his desire to keep him at the club, and the spell was extended until 15 December.

In January 2012 Derbyshire went on loan to Championship club Blackpool but failed to score for them.

=== Rotherham United ===
Derbyshire signed for newly promoted Championship team Rotherham United on a two-year contract on 30 May 2014. Before his departure in summer 2016 he scored 17 goals in 69 matches for the club.

=== Omonia Nicosia ===
On 17 June 2016, Cypriot First Division club Omonia Nicosia announced the signing of Derbyshire. He made his debut on 30 June against FC Banants Yerevan in the first leg of the Europa League first qualifying round, and scored the only goal of the match. In his first league appearance, in a 3–1 win against Ermis Aradippou, Derbyshire opened the scoring with a second-minute penalty. On 4 January 2017 he drew attention when he scored a hat-trick against Ethnikos Achna in 4 minutes, overturning a 2–0 deficit against Omonia, that gave his side a valuable league victory. He continued to score regularly, and finished the season as the league's top scorer with 24 goals, three more than his nearest rival.

On 9 August 2017, Omonia announced the extension of his contract until the summer of 2021.

In the first game of the 2017-18 season, on 10 September 2017, he scored both goals for Omonia against Ethnikos Achna. He scored 23 goals from 33 appearances over the season, which made him again the league's top scorer.

In the 2018–19 season Derbyshire made 25 league appearances but scored only twice.

On the opening day of the 2019—20 season, Derbyshire opened the scoring against Doxa Katokopias with a header.

=== Later career and retirement ===
On 4 August 2020, it was announced that Derbyshire had signed for new Australian A-League club Macarthur FC on a two-year contract.

On 10 July 2021, Macarthur FC confirmed that they had agreed an undisclosed fee for Derbyshire's transfer to Cypriot top-flight club AEK Larnaca. The move was reported elsewhere as a free transfer.

Derbyshire signed for NorthEast United of the Indian Super League on 2 September 2022.

On 30 December 2022 it was announced that Derbyshire would sign for Bradford City on 9 January 2023. He was released by Bradford City at the end of the 2023–24 season.

On 1 November 2024, Derbyshire announced his retirement from football.

== International career ==
Derbyshire was called up to the England Under-21 squad by new manager Stuart Pearce for a friendly against Spain on 6 February, but was forced to withdraw after he tore a thigh muscle playing for Blackburn three days before the match.

However, Derbyshire was fit enough to be included in the under-21 squad to face Italy in the opening fixture of the new Wembley Stadium on 24 March; he scored England's third goal in a thrilling 3–3 draw. During the group stage of the 2007 European Under-21 Football Championship, he was the scorer of a controversial goal against the Serbian under-21 team. He did not kick the ball out when Serbian defender Slobodan Rajković was down injured and went on to score England's second goal of the game; in his defence, Derbyshire claimed he did not see the injured player. He took part in the epic semi-final shootout against hosts Netherlands, scoring his first but having his second penalty saved as England lost 13–12. On 27 March 2009, Derbyshire played the second half for England as they beat Norway 5–0, scoring two goals.

== Personal life ==
Derbyshire's wife Melissa, née Norman, is from Ireland and they have three children Braidin, Kendall and Killian.

== Career statistics ==
Appearances and goals by club, season and competition
Club	Season	League			National cup		League cup		Continental		Other		Total	
Club	Season	Division	Apps	Goals	Apps	Goals	Apps	Goals	Apps	Goals	Apps	Goals	Apps	Goals
Blackburn Rovers	2004–05	Premier League	1	0	0	0	0	0	—		—		1	0
Blackburn Rovers	2005–06	Premier League	0	0	—		0	0	—		—		1	0
Blackburn Rovers	2006–07	Premier League	22	5	6	4	0	0	2 (Note: Appearances in UEFA Cup)	0	—		30	9
Blackburn Rovers	2007–08	Premier League	23	3	1	0	3	1	6 (Note: Two appearances and one goal in UEFA Intertoto Cup; four appearances and one goal in UEFA Cup)	2	—		33	6
Blackburn Rovers	2008–09	Premier League	17	2	1	0	4	3	—		—		22	5
Blackburn Rovers	Total		63	10	8	4	7	4	8	2	—		86	20
Plymouth Argyle (loan)	2005–06	Championship	12	0	—		1	0	—		—		13	0
Wrexham (loan)	2005–06	League Two	16	10	—		—		—		1 (Note: Appearance in FAW Premier Cup)	0	17	10
Olympiacos (loan)	2008–09	Super League Greece	7	5	4	3	—		2	0	—		13	8
Olympiacos	2009–10	Super League Greece	14	6	0	0	—		2 (Note: Appearances in UEFA Champions League)	0	5 (Note: Appearances in Super League Greece play-offs)	0	21	6
Olympiacos	2010–11	Super League Greece	—		—		—		2 (Note: Appearances in UEFA Europa League)	1	—		2	1
Olympiacos	Total		21	11	4	3	0	0	6	1	5	0	36	15
Birmingham City (loan)	2010–11	Premier League	13	0	2	2	5	1	—		—		20	3
Nottingham Forest	2011–12	Championship	15	1	0	0	1	1	—		—		16	2
Nottingham Forest	2012–13	Championship	0	0	0	0	0	0	—		—		0	0
Nottingham Forest	2013–14	Championship	29	7	3	0	3	3	—		—		35	10
Nottingham Forest	Total		44	8	3	0	4	4	—		—		51	12
Oldham Athletic (loan)	2012–13	League One	18	4	2	2	—		—		—		20	6
Blackpool (loan)	2012–13	Championship	12	0	—		—		—		—		12	0
Rotherham United	2014–15	Championship	34	9	1	0	1	1	—		—		36	10
Rotherham United	2015–16	Championship	35	8	1	0	2	0	—		—		38	8
Rotherham United	Total		69	17	2	0	3	1	—		—		74	18
Omonia	2016–17	Cypriot First Division	33	24	4	1	—		4	2	—		41	27
Omonia	2017–18	Cypriot First Division	33	23	2	2	—		—		—		35	25
Omonia	2018–19	Cypriot First Division	25	2	3	0	—		—		—		28	2
Omonia	2019–20	Cypriot First Division	22	13	1	2	—		—		—		23	15
Omonia	Total		113	62	10	5	0	0	4	2	—		127	69
Macarthur FC	2020–21	A-League	25	14	—		—		—		2 (Note: Appearances in A-League Finals)	0	27	14
AEK Larnaca	2021–22	Cypriot First Division	21	5	5	2	—		—		—		26	7
NorthEast United	2022–23	Indian Super League	8	1	0	0	—		—		—		8	1
Bradford City	2022–23	League Two	11	1	—		—		—		2 (Note: Appearances in League Two play-offs)	1	13	2
Bradford City	2023–24	League Two	9	0	0	0	1	0	—		0	0	10	0
Bradford City	Total		20	1	0	0	1	0	—		2	1	23	2
Career total			455	143	36	18	21	10	18	5	10	1	540	177

== Honours ==
Olympiacos

- Super League Greece: 2008–09
- Greek Cup: 2008–09

Birmingham City

- Football League Cup: 2010–11

Individual

- 2009 Greek Cup final Man of the Match
- Cypriot First Division top goalscorer: 2016–17, 2017–18
- A-League PFA Team of the Season: 2020–21
