= Dimitris Christofi =

Cypriot footballer (born 1987)

Personal information
- Date of birth: 28 September 1988 (age 38)
- Place of birth: Sotira, Cyprus
- Height: 1.77 m (5 ft 10 in)
- Positions: Winger; forward

Youth career
- Onisilos Sotiras

Senior career*
Years	Team	Apps	(Gls)
2005–2007	Onisilos Sotira	36	(9)
2007–2008	Enosis Neon Paralimni	27	(9)
2008–2013	Omonia	136	(26)
2013–2015	Sion	48	(4)
2015–2020	Omonia	81	(17)
2020–2023	Anorthosis Famagusta	91	(10)
2023–2025	Ethnikos Achna	25	(0)
Total		447	(75)

International career
2009	Cyprus U21	3	(1)
2008–2023	Cyprus	72	(9)
- * Club domestic league appearances and goals

Dimitris Christofi (Greek: Δημήτρης Χριστοφή; born 28 September 1988) is a Cypriot former professional footballer who played as a winger and forward.

== Club career ==
Christofi was a winger who also played as a centre-forward or second striker who was highly regarded for his strong shot. He began his football career at Onisilos Sotira, before joining Enosis Neon Paralimni in 2007.

His transfer from Enosis Neon Paralimni to Omonia in 2008 was the most expensive transfer in the history of Cypriot football at the time, at a reported cost of €1 million. During his time at Omonia, he won the Cypriot First Division, the Cypriot Cup and the Cypriot Super Cup.

On 16 June 2013, FC Sion announced Christofi's signing on a three-year contract. During his time in Switzerland, he won the Swiss Cup in the 2014–15 season.

He returned to Omonia in August 2015, initially on a two-year deal before extenfing his contract in 2017.

On 31 January 2020, Christofi joined Anorthosis Famagusta. He won the Cypriot Cup with the club in 2021 and remained there until 2023. He was released by Anorthosis in June 2023 as they wanted to reduce the average age of the squad. In his time with the club he made 91 appearances and scored 10 goals. He then joined Ethnikos Achna, the final club of his playing career before retiring from professional football in August 2025.

On 29 June 2026, Enosis Neon Paralimni announced his return to the club as sporting director.

== International career ==
Christofi represented the Cyprus national team between 2008 and 2023, recording 72 appearances and scoring nine goals.

On 9 September 2014, he scored both goals in Cyprus's 2–1 away victory over Bosnia and Herzegovina in UEFA Euro 2016 qualifying.

== Personal life ==
On 8 June 2013, Christofi married Antigoni Markou.

== Career statistics ==
=== Club ===
As of match played 19 August 2023

Appearances and goals by club, season and competition
Club	Season	League			National cup		Europe		Other		Total	
Club	Season	Division	Apps	Goals	Apps	Goals	Apps	Goals	Apps	Goals	Apps	Goals
Omonia	2008–09	Cypriot First Division	30	10	0	0	6	1	0	0	36	11
Omonia	2009–10	Cypriot First Division	28	1	0	0	3	0	0	0	31	1
Omonia	2010–11	Cypriot First Division	17	2	0	0	0	0	0	0	17	2
Omonia	2011–12	Cypriot First Division	29	5	4	1	4	1	0	0	37	7
Omonia	2012–13	Cypriot First Division	32	8	5	0	2	0	0	0	39	8
Omonia	Total		136	26	9	1	15	2	0	0	160	29
Sion	2013–14	Swiss Super League	30	2	2	0	0	0	0	0	32	2
Sion	2014–15	Swiss Super League	16	2	3	0	0	0	0	0	19	2
Sion	2015–16	Swiss Super League	2	0	0	0	0	0	0	0	2	0
Sion	Total		48	4	5	0	0	0	0	0	53	4
Omonia	2015–16	Cypriot First Division	10	1	2	1	0	0	0	0	12	2
Omonia	2016–17	Cypriot First Division	28	8	3	1	1	0	0	0	32	9
Omonia	2017–18	Cypriot First Division	31	6	1	0	0	0	0	0	32	6
Omonia	2018–19	Cypriot First Division	6	1	0	0	0	0	0	0	6	1
Omonia	2019–20	Cypriot First Division	6	1	1	0	0	0	0	0	7	1
Omonia	Total		81	17	7	2	1	0	0	0	89	19
Anorthosis	2019–20	Cypriot First Division	4	1	2	0	0	0	0	0	6	1
Anorthosis	2020–21	Cypriot First Division	30	0	6	2	1	0	0	0	37	2
Anorthosis	2021–22	Cypriot First Division	25	4	6	0	8	1	0	0	39	5
Anorthosis	2022–23	Cypriot First Division	32	5	4	0	0	0	0	0	36	5
Anorthosis	Total		91	10	18	2	9	1	0	0	118	13
Ethnikos Achna	2023–24	Cypriot First Division	1	0	0	0	0	0	0	0	1	0
Career total			357	57	39	5	25	3	0	0	421	65

=== International ===
Scores and results list Cyprus' goal tally first, score column indicates score after each Christofi goal.

List of international goals scored by Dimitris Christofi
No.	Date	Venue	Opponent	Score	Result	Competition
1	19 November 2008	GSP Stadium, Nicosia, Cyprus	Belarus	1–0	2–1	Friendly
2	28 March 2009	Antonis Papadopoulos Stadium, Larnaca, Cyprus	Georgia	2–1	2–1	2010 FIFA World Cup Qualification
3	11 November 2011	Antonis Papadopoulos Stadium, Larnaca, Cyprus	Scotland	1–2	1–2	Friendly
4	9 September 2014	Bilino Polje, Zenica, Bosnia and Herzegovina	Bosnia and Herzegovina	1–1	2–1	UEFA Euro 2016 qualifying
5	9 September 2014	Bilino Polje, Zenica, Bosnia and Herzegovina	Bosnia and Herzegovina	2–1	2–1	UEFA Euro 2016 qualifying
6	16 November 2014	GSP Stadium, Nicosia, Cyprus	Andorra	5–0	5–0	UEFA Euro 2016 qualifying
7	22 March 2017	GSP Stadium, Nicosia, Cyprus	Kazakhstan	3–1	3–1	Friendly
8	31 August 2017	GSP Stadium, Nicosia, Cyprus	Bosnia and Herzegovina	1–2	3–2	2018 FIFA World Cup qualification
9	28 March 2023	Vazgen Sargsyan Republican Stadium, Yerevan Armenia	Armenia	2–2	2–2	Friendly

== Honours ==
AC Omonia

- Cypriot First Division: 2009–10
- Cypriot Cup: 2010–11, 2011–12
- Cypriot Super Cup: 2010, 2012

FC Sion

- Swiss Cup: 2014–15

Anorthosis Famagusta

- Cypriot Cup: 2020-21
