= Fidelis Irhene =

Nigerian footballer

Personal information
- Full name: Fidelis Christopher Irhene
- Date of birth: 20 January 1996 (age 30)
- Place of birth: Jos, Nigeria
- Height: 1.85 m (6 ft 1 in)
- Position: Midfielder

Youth career
- 2014–2015: Porto B

Senior career*
Years	Team	Apps	(Gls)
2015–2017	Porto B	0	(0)
2015–2017	→ Portimonense (loan)	41	(1)
2017–2019	AEL Limassol	35	(2)
2019	→ Doxa Katokopias (loan)	4	(0)
2020–2021	Mafra	7	(1)
2021–2022	Amora	17	(0)
2023-2024	Marinhense	21	(0)
2024–2025	Pombal	14	(0)
2025	Nelas	10	(0)
- * Club domestic league appearances and goals as of 13 July 2025

Fidelis Christopher Irhene (born 20 January 1996) is a Nigerian professional footballer who last played as a midfielder for Portuguese club Nelas.

== Career ==
=== Youth career ===
Born in Jos, Nigeria, Fidelis began his football career with Portuguese giants FC Porto, where he featured in the UEFA Youth League before earning promotion to the club’s B team.

=== Portimonense ===
On 30 June 2017,Shortly thereafter, he was loaned to Portuguese giants Portimonense where he played a key role in helping the team win the Segunda Liga and secure promotion to the Primeira Liga.

He made his professional debut in the Segunda Liga for Portimonense on 15 August 2015, in a game against Académico de Viseu.

=== Porto B ===
He returned to Porto B after a short stint.

=== AEL Limassol ===
In 2017, Fidelis made a move to AEL Limassol in the Cypriot First Division, where he competed in the UEFA Europa League, scoring two goals during the campaign.

=== Doxa Katokopias ===
He joined Doxa Katokopias on loan in September 2019.

Irhene became a free agent in January 2020, after his loan spell at Doxa Katokopias. He immediately terminated his contract with his parent club AEL Limassol.

=== In the Portugal lower leagues ===
On 7 January 2017, Irhene signed for Mafra until August 2021.

Irhene transferred to Amora of Portugal in August 2021.

In January 2023, he joined Marinhense.

He signed with Pombal in 2024 and played one season with the club.

=== Nelas ===
On 24 January 2025, Irhene moved on a free transfer to Portugues side Nelas.
