= Acorán Barrera =

Spanish footballer

Acorán
Personal information
- Full name: Acorán Barrera Reyes
- Date of birth: 31 January 1983 (age 43)
- Place of birth: Santa Cruz de Tenerife, Spain
- Height: 1.71 m (5 ft 7 1/2 in)
- Position: Attacking midfielder

Senior career*
Years	Team	Apps	(Gls)
2001–2002	Tenerife B		
2001–2005	Tenerife	9	(0)
2002–2003	→ Burgos (loan)	27	(0)
2003–2004	→ Corralejo (loan)	29	(6)
2004–2005	→ Universidad LP (loan)	34	(4)
2005–2006	Celta B	27	(3)
2006–2007	Melilla	29	(2)
2007–2008	San Isidro	14	(5)
2008–2009	Melilla	52	(7)
2009–2011	Puertollano	56	(11)
2011–2016	Ponferradina	213	(36)
2016–2022	AEK Larnaca	160	(29)
Total		650	(103)
- * Club domestic league appearances and goals

Acorán Barrera Reyes (Spanish pronunciation: [akoˈɾam baˈreɾa ˈreʝes]; born 31 January 1983), known simply as Acorán, is a Spanish former professional footballer who played as an attacking midfielder.

He appeared in 176 Segunda División matches over five seasons, scoring 28 goals for Ponferradina. He also spent several years in the Cypriot First Division, with AEK Larnaca.

== Club career ==
Born in Santa Cruz de Tenerife, Canary Islands, Acorán made his professional debut with his hometown club CD Tenerife, first appearing in La Liga on 9 September 2001 in a 3–0 away loss against RC Celta de Vigo (eight minutes played). After the team's relegation, he resumed his career in the Segunda División B and the Tercera División, three of those seasons still as a Tenerife player.

In the last days of the 2011 January transfer window, Acorán signed for SD Ponferradina of Segunda División, from CD Puertollano. He started in 19 of his 20 appearances during the campaign, but could not help prevent relegation for the Castile and León side.

On 20 December 2011, Acorán scored against Real Madrid in the Copa del Rey, albeit in a 5–1 defeat at the Santiago Bernabéu Stadium (7–1 on aggregate). After winning promotion to the second division in 2012, he never played less than 36 league games in the following four seasons, always in that tier.

Acorán moved abroad for the first time at the age of 33, signing with Cypriot First Division club AEK Larnaca FC. On 16 May 2018, he scored the winning goal in the domestic cup final, sealing a 2–1 victory over Apollon Limassol FC and enabling them to collect their first silverware since lifting the same trophy in 2004.

Acorán retired at the end of the 2021–22 campaign.

== Honours ==
AEK Larnaca

- Cypriot Cup: 2017–18
- Cypriot Super Cup: 2018
