= Marco Airosa =

Angolan footballer

Personal information
- Full name: Marco Ibraim de Sousa Airosa
- Date of birth: 6 August 1984 (age 42)
- Place of birth: Luanda, Angola
- Height: 1.78 m (5 ft 10 in)
- Position: Right back

Youth career
- 1994–2003: Pescadores

Senior career*
Years	Team	Apps	(Gls)
2003–2004	Pescadores		
2004–2005	Alverca	25	(0)
2005–2006	Barreirense	27	(0)
2006–2007	União Leiria	0	(0)
2006–2007	→ Olhanense (loan)	19	(0)
2007–2008	Fátima	19	(1)
2008–2014	Nacional	1	(0)
2010–2011	→ Aves (loan)	20	(0)
2011–2014	→ AEL Limassol (loan)	65	(0)
2014–2018	AEL Limassol	77	(0)
2020–2021	Loures	17	(0)

International career
2006–2013	Angola	26	(0)
- * Club domestic league appearances and goals as of 22:29, 17 March 2018 (UTC)

Marco Ibraim de Sousa Airosa (born 6 August 1984) is an Angolan former footballer who played as a right back.

== Club career ==
Airosa was born in Luanda. During his Portuguese career he represented G.D.P. Costa de Caparica, F.C. Alverca, F.C. Barreirense, S.C. Olhanense – loaned by U.D. Leiria, for whom he never appeared – C.D. Fátima, C.D. Nacional (where he made his Primeira Liga debut) and C.D. Aves.

Having signed with the club in 2011 at the age of 27, Airosa went on to spend several seasons in the Cypriot First Division with AEL Limassol.

== International career ==
A member of the Angola national team, Airosa was called up to the 2006 FIFA World Cup and the 2008 Africa Cup of Nations. He appeared in four matches in the latter tournament, helping the country to the quarter-finals in Ghana.
