= 2022–23 Aris Limassol FC season =

Aris Limassol
2022–23 season
- Chairman: Vladimir Fedorov
- Manager: Aleksey Shpilevsky
- Stadium: Tsirio Stadium (Old stadium); AEK Arena – Georgios Karapatakis (Note: Aris Limassol played their home matches in UEFA Europa Conference League at AEK Arena – Georgios Karapatakis in Larnaca, instead of their regular stadium, Tsirio Stadium in Limassol, which did not meet UEFA requirements.); Antonis Papadopoulos Stadium (Temporary stadiums); Alphamega Stadium (New stadium)
- Cypriot First Division: 1st
- Cypriot Cup: Second round
- UEFA Europa Conference League: Second qualifying round
- Top goalscorer: League: Aleksandr Kokorin (13)
- Biggest win: 5–0 v Olympiakos Nicosia (Home, 2 September 2022, Cypriot First Division)
- Biggest defeat: 0–3 v Neftçi (Away, 28 July 2022, UEFA Europa Conference League)
Home colours	Away colours	Third colours

The 2022–23 season was Aris Limassol Football Club's 2nd consecutive season in the Cypriot First Division. In addition to the domestic league, Aris Limassol participated in the Cypriot Cup and the UEFA Europa Conference League.

== Squad ==
Squad at end of season

Note: Flags indicate national team as defined under FIFA eligibility rules; some limited exceptions apply. Players may hold more than one non-FIFA nationality.

No.	Pos.	Nation	Player
1	GK	BRA	Vaná
2	DF	ALG	Abdeljalil Medioub
3	DF	BRA	Caju
4	DF	CMR	Ismael Yandal
5	DF	CYP	Kostas Pileas
6	DF	GHA	Eric Boakye
7	FW	SWE	Leo Bengtsson
8	MF	ENG	Morgan Brown
9	FW	AUT	Daniel Sikorski
10	MF	CYP	Matija Špoljarić
11	FW	POL	Mariusz Stępiński
13	DF	CPV	Delmiro
14	FW	SEN	Yannick Gomis
20	DF	BFA	Steeve Yago

No.	Pos.	Nation	Player
21	FW	RSA	Mihlali Mayambela
22	FW	FRA	Kévin Monnet-Paquet
23	MF	POL	Karol Struski
30	DF	GAB	Alex Moucketou-Moussounda
31	DF	SWE	Franz Brorsson
37	MF	SVK	Július Szöke
38	GK	CYP	Michalis Sofroniou
58	MF	BLR	Yevgeny Yablonsky
80	FW	GAB	Shavy Babicka
88	FW	BLR	Artyom Shumansky
90	GK	CYP	Ellinas Sofroniou
97	MF	BUL	Ivan Pankov
99	FW	RUS	Aleksandr Kokorin

== Competitions ==
=== Overview ===
Competition	First match	Last match	Starting round	Final position	Record							
Competition	First match	Last match	Starting round	Final position	Pld	W	D	L	GF	GA	GD	Win %
Cypriot First Division	28 August 2022	27 May 2023	Matchday 1	Winners	36	21	11	4	65	28	+37	58.33
Cypriot Cup	18 January 2023	18 January 2023	Second round	Second round	1	0	0	1	2	4	−2	0.00
UEFA Europa Conference League	21 July 2022	28 July 2022	Second qualifying round	Second qualifying round	2	1	0	1	2	3	−1	50.00
Total					39	22	11	6	69	35	+34	56.41

Source: Competitions

=== Cypriot First Division ===
==== Regular season ====
===== League table =====
Pos	Team	Pld	W	D	L	GF	GA	GD	Pts	Qualification or relegation
1	APOEL	26	18	5	3	40	13	+27	59	Qualification for the Championship round
2	AEK Larnaca	26	18	3	5	46	21	+25	57	Qualification for the Championship round
3	Aris Limassol	26	15	8	3	46	20	+26	53	Qualification for the Championship round
4	Pafos	26	14	8	4	48	20	+28	50	Qualification for the Championship round
5	Apollon Limassol	25	13	5	7	34	27	+7	44	Qualification for the Championship round

Source: Cyprus Football Association
Rules for classification: 1) Points; 2) Head-to-head points; 3) Head-to-head goal difference; 4) Head-to-head goals scored; 5) Head-to-head away goals scored (only if two teams); 6) Goal difference; 7) Goals scored; 8) Play-off (only if deciding championship round, relegation round or relegation).

===== Results summary =====
Overall								Home						Away					
Pld	W	D	L	GF	GA	GD	Pts	W	D	L	GF	GA	GD	W	D	L	GF	GA	GD
26	15	8	3	46	20	+26	53	7	4	2	25	12	+13	8	4	1	21	8	+13

Source: Worldfootball

===== Results by round =====
Round	1	2	3	4	5	6	7	8	9	10	11	12	13	14	15	16	17	18	19	20	21	22	23	24	25	26
Ground	H	H	A	H	A	H	A	H	A	H	A	H	A	A	A	H	A	H	A	H	A	H	A	H	A	H
Result	W	W	W	L	W	L	W	W	W	D	W	D	W	D	D	D	D	D	L	W	W	W	W	W	D	W
Position	1	1	1	3	1	3	2	2	2	2	2	3	3	4	4	4	4	4	4	4	4	4	4	3	3	3
Points	3	6	9	9	12	12	15	18	21	22	25	26	29	30	31	32	33	34	34	37	40	43	46	49	50	53

Source: Worldfootball
A = Away; H = Home; W = Win; D = Draw; L = Loss

===== Matches =====
28 August 2022 1	Aris Limassol	2–1	AEL Limassol	Limassol
19:00 EEST (UTC+3)	Bengtsson (yellow card) 39'; Mayambela 53'; Brown (yellow card) 62'; Babicka 90+1'; Caju (yellow card) 90+4'	Report	Yago 2' (o.g.); Zdravkovski (yellow card) 24'; Bruno Santos (yellow card) 85'	Stadium: Tsirio Stadium; Referee: C. Theouli

2 September 2022 2	Aris Limassol	5–0	Olympiakos Nicosia	Limassol
19:00 EEST (UTC+3)	Bengtsson 23'; Szöke (yellow card) 27'; Babicka 30', 54'; Brown 49'; Moucketou-Moussounda (yellow card) 59'; M. Špoljarić 90+1'	Report	Mouktaris (yellow card) 13'	Stadium: Tsirio Stadium; Referee: K. Fellas

10 September 2022 3	APOEL	0–1	Aris Limassol	Nicosia
20:00 EEST (UTC+3)	Chebake (yellow card) 30'	Report	Caju (yellow card) 18', (yellow card) 30'; Moucketou-Moussounda (yellow card) 23'; Babicka (yellow card) 32'; Yago (yellow card) 66'; Delmiro (yellow card) 90+5'	Stadium: GSP Stadium; Referee: A. Argyrou

15 September 2022 4	Aris Limassol	1–2	Karmiotissa	Larnaca
19:00 EEST (UTC+3)	Struski (yellow card) 38'; Brown (yellow card) 63'; Yago (red card) 78'; Kokorin 90+5'	Report	Malone 6'; El Allouchi 77'	Stadium: Antonis Papadopoulos Stadium; Referee: I. Christodoulou

2 October 2022 5	Akritas Chlorakas	0–3	Aris Limassol	Paphos
19:00 EEST (UTC+3)	Karagiannis (yellow card) 14'; Fauriel (yellow card) 89'	Report	Bengtsson 12', 33', (yellow card) 45+1'; Kokorin (yellow card) 32'; Caju (yellow card) 52'; Sikorski (yellow card) 57'; Gomis 81'; Djave (yellow card) 85'	Stadium: Stelios Kyriakides Stadium; Referee: K. Athanassiou

9 October 2022 6	Aris Limassol	1–2	AEK Larnaca	Larnaca
19:00 EEST (UTC+3)	Mayambela (yellow card) 11'; Kokorin 32'	Report	Trichkovski 23'; Romo 73'	Stadium: Antonis Papadopoulos Stadium; Referee: C. Theouli

17 October 2022 7	Apollon Limassol	0–3	Aris Limassol	Limassol
19:00 EEST (UTC+3)	Coll (yellow card) 43'; Recio (yellow card) 87'	Report	Babicka (yellow card) 60'; Kokorin 75', (yellow card) 76'; Djave 90', (yellow card) 90'; Stępiński 90+5' (pen.)	Stadium: Tsirio Stadium; Referee: C. Theouli

23 October 2022 8	Aris Limassol	2–1	Enosis Neon Paralimni	Larnaca
19:00 EEST (UTC+3)	Struski 20', (yellow card) 73'; Bengtsson 22'; Yago (yellow card) 28'; M. Špoljarić (yellow card) 87'; Szöke (yellow card) 89'	Report	Diawara 10'; Katsiaris (yellow card) 38'; Lucero (yellow card) 45'; Korsia (yellow card) 90+3'	Stadium: Antonis Papadopoulos Stadium; Referee: A. Menelaos

31 October 2022 9	Doxa Katokopias	1–2	Aris Limassol	Nicosia
19:00 EET (UTC+2)	Sobczyk 22'; Mesén (red card) 53'	Report	Struski 10'; Brorsson (yellow card) 36', (goal) 71'; Kokorin (penalty missed) 52'; Caju (yellow card) 87'; Mayambela (yellow card) 90+4'; Moucketou-Moussounda (yellow card) 90+6'	Stadium: Makario Stadium; Referee: C. Theouli

7 November 2022 10	Aris Limassol	1–1	Omonia	Larnaca
18:30 EET (UTC+2)	Kokorin (yellow card) 25', (goal) 39'; Caju (yellow card) 45+2'; Boakye (yellow card) 75'	Report	Hooper 72'; Cassamá (yellow card) 79'	Stadium: Antonis Papadopoulos Stadium; Referee: K. Fotiou

11 November 2022 11	Nea Salamis Famagusta	1–3	Aris Limassol	Larnaca
19:00 EET (UTC+2)	Adoni 68'; Sergiou (yellow card) 75'	Report	Brown 4'; Medioub (yellow card) 12'; M. Špoljarić 37'; Djave (yellow card) 42'; Brorsson (yellow card) 73'; Yago (yellow card) 84'; Adoni 87' (o.g.)	Stadium: Ammochostos Epistrofi Stadium; Referee: M. Christoforou

28 November 2022 12	Aris Limassol	2–2	Pafos	Larnaca
19:00 EET (UTC+2)	Szöke (yellow card) 42'; Bengtsson 50'; Kokorin (yellow card) 53', (goal) 65' (pen.)	Report	Ikoko (yellow card) 37'; Kané (yellow card) 53'; Abdurahimi 57'; Jairo 79', (yellow card) 80'	Stadium: Antonis Papadopoulos Stadium; Referee: A. Menelaos

4 December 2022 13	Anorthosis Famagusta	0–2	Aris Limassol	Larnaca
17:00 EET (UTC+2)	Kiko (yellow card) 42'; Warda (yellow card) 80'; Haroyan (yellow card) 84'	Report	Caju 30'; Babicka 52'; Yablonsky (yellow card) 80'; Szöke (yellow card) 90+5'	Stadium: Antonis Papadopoulos Stadium; Referee: C. Theouli

11 December 2022 14	AEL Limassol	0–0	Aris Limassol	Limassol
19:00 EET (UTC+2)	Basto (yellow card) 37'; Teixeira (yellow card) 39'; Milinceanu (yellow card) 65'; Tshibola (yellow card) 77'; Medojević (yellow card) 78'	Report	Gomis (yellow card) 43'; Bengtsson (yellow card) 53'; Brorsson (yellow card) 64'; Moucketou-Moussounda (red card) 76'	Stadium: Tsirio Stadium; Referee: A. Argyrou

16 December 2022 15	Olympiakos Nicosia	0–0	Aris Limassol	Nicosia
19:00 EET (UTC+2)	Bardy (yellow card) 70'	Report	Struski (yellow card) 40'	Stadium: GSP Stadium; Referee: K. Athanassiou

22 December 2022 16	Aris Limassol	1–1	APOEL	Limassol
19:00 EET (UTC+2)	Struski 43'; Caju (yellow card) 76'	Report	Marquinhos 45+3' (pen.); Dálcio (yellow card) 76'	Stadium: Alphamega Stadium; Referee: A. Menelaos

5 January 2023 17	Karmiotissa	0–0	Aris Limassol	Larnaca
19:00 EET (UTC+2)	Economides (yellow card) 25'; Coulibaly (yellow card) 90+7'	Report	Kokorin (yellow card) 51'; Moucketou-Moussounda (yellow card) 75'; Stępiński (yellow card) 90+7'	Stadium: Ammochostos Stadium; Referee: K. Athanassiou

9 January 2023 18	Aris Limassol	0–0	Akritas Chlorakas	Limassol
19:00 EET (UTC+2)	Brorsson (red card) 51'	Report	Clemente (yellow card) 9'; Šehić (yellow card) 50'; Lopes (yellow card) 90+5'	Stadium: Alphamega Stadium; Referee: K. Fellas

15 January 2023 19	AEK Larnaca	4–3	Aris Limassol	Larnaca
17:00 EET (UTC+2)	Altman 33', 67'; Lopes 35'; García (yellow card) 84'; Faraj 90+5'	Report	Boakye (yellow card) 16'; Struski 21', (yellow card) 21'; Stępiński (yellow card) 25'; Gomis 28', 80'; Vaná (yellow card) 34'; Szöke (yellow card) 90'	Stadium: AEK Arena – Georgios Karapatakis; Referee: C. Theouli

23 January 2023 20	Aris Limassol	3–1	Apollon Limassol	Limassol
17:00 EET (UTC+2)	Kokorin 29', 84' (pen.); Stępiński 45'; Szöke (yellow card) 53'; Delmiro (yellow card) 88'	Report	D. Špoljarić (yellow card) 52'; Brorsson 73' (o.g.); Iliev (yellow card) 90+2'	Stadium: Alphamega Stadium; Referee: I. Christodoulou

30 January 2023 21	Enosis Neon Paralimni	0–1	Aris Limassol	Paralimni
19:00 EET (UTC+2)	Polykarpou (yellow card) 77'; Jevremović (yellow card) 90+4'; Silva (yellow card) 90+6'	Report	Mayambela (yellow card) 33'; Pileas (yellow card) 53'; Gomis 90+7' (pen.)	Stadium: Paralimni Stadium; Referee: C. Theouli

6 February 2023 22	Aris Limassol	2–1	Doxa Katokopias	Limassol
19:00 EET (UTC+2)	Kokorin 56' (pen.); Yago (yellow card) 63'; Karamanolis 72' (o.g.); Szöke (yellow card) 89'	Report	Karamanolis 21'; Trujić (yellow card) 75'; Ojala (yellow card) 86'	Stadium: Alphamega Stadium; Referee: K. Athanassiou

10 February 2023 23	Omonia	1–2	Aris Limassol	Nicosia
20:00 EET (UTC+2)	Cassamá (yellow card) 31'; Bezus (yellow card) 33'; Ansarifard 81' (pen.); Diskerud (yellow card) 81'	Report	Bengtsson 20'; Pileas (yellow card) 25'; Struski (yellow card) 27'; Szöke (yellow card) 37'; Babicka 44'	Stadium: GSP Stadium; Referee: F. Verissimo (Portugal)

18 February 2023 24	Aris Limassol	3–0	Nea Salamis Famagusta	Limassol
16:00 EET (UTC+2)	Kokorin 3' (pen.), (yellow card) 4'; Gomis 6'; Katsikas 36' (o.g.); Struski (yellow card) 42'	Report	Ofori (yellow card) 41'	Stadium: Alphamega Stadium; Referee: M. Christoforou

24 February 2023 25	Pafos	1–1	Aris Limassol	Peristerona
19:00 EET (UTC+2)	Tanković (yellow card) 34'; Jairo 70'; Valakari (yellow card) 90+9'	Report	Bengtsson (yellow card) 28'; Szöke 35', (yellow card) 45+1'; Struski (yellow card) 38'; Yago (yellow card) 90+5'	Stadium: Katokopia Stadium; Referee: I. Christodoulou

7 March 2023 26	Aris Limassol	2–0	Anorthosis Famagusta	Limassol
18:00 EET (UTC+2)	Boakye 27'; Bengtsson (yellow card) 45+1'; Mayambela 64'	Report	Antoniadis (yellow card) 43'; Sabo (yellow card) 70'	Stadium: Alphamega Stadium; Referee: A. Menelaos

==== Championship round ====
===== Championship round table =====
Pos	Team	Pld	W	D	L	GF	GA	GD	Pts	Qualification	ARI	APOE	AEK	PAF	APOL	OMO
1	Aris Limassol (C)	36	21	11	4	65	28	+37	74	Qualification for the Champions League second qualifying round	—	0–0	4–0	2–1	2–0	1–0
2	APOEL	36	20	11	5	52	26	+26	71	Qualification for the Europa Conference League second qualifying round	4–3	—	2–1	0–0	0–2	0–0
3	AEK Larnaca	36	20	6	10	55	37	+18	66	Qualification for the Europa Conference League second qualifying round	1–1	2–2	—	1–1	0–1	2–0
4	Pafos	36	17	12	7	60	30	+30	63		2–2	1–1	4–0	—	2–1	0–1
5	Apollon Limassol	35	19	5	11	47	37	+10	62		0–1	3–2	1–0	0–1	—	3–1
6	Omonia (Note: Cup winner)	36	15	4	17	43	42	+1	49	Qualification for the Europa Conference League second qualifying round	0–3	1–1	0–2	2–0	1–2	—

Source: Cyprus Football Association
Rules for classification: 1) Points; 2) Head-to-head points; 3) Head-to-head goal difference; 4) Head-to-head goals scored; 5) Head-to-head away goals scored (only if two teams); 6) Goal difference; 7) Goals scored; 8) Play-off (only if deciding championship round, relegation round or relegation).
(C) Champions

===== Results summary =====
Overall								Home						Away					
Pld	W	D	L	GF	GA	GD	Pts	W	D	L	GF	GA	GD	W	D	L	GF	GA	GD
10	6	3	1	19	8	+11	21	4	1	0	9	1	+8	2	2	1	10	7	+3

Source: Worldfootball

===== Results by round =====
Round	27	28	29	30	31	32	33	34	35	36
Ground	A	H	A	A	H	H	A	H	H	A
Result	D	W	W	W	D	W	D	W	W	L
Position	3	2	2	1	1	1	1	1	1	1
Points	54	57	60	63	64	67	68	71	74	74

Source: Worldfootball
A = Away; H = Home; W = Win; D = Draw; L = Loss

===== Matches =====
12 March 2023 27	Pafos	2–2	Aris Limassol	Paphos
17:00 EET (UTC+2)	Valakari 15' (pen.), 87'; Pelágio (yellow card) 68'; Juninho (yellow card) 89'	Report	Kokorin 15' (pen.), (yellow card) 90+5'; Moucketou-Moussounda (yellow card) 33'; Bengtsson 45+2'; Yago (yellow card) 90+10'	Stadium: Stelios Kyriakides Stadium; Referee: C. Theouli

20 March 2023 28	Aris Limassol	4–0	AEK Larnaca	Limassol
17:00 EET (UTC+2)	Kokorin 10'; Gomis 60'; Szöke (yellow card) 71'; Mayambela 77', 87', (yellow card) 87'	Report	Altman (yellow card) 4'; Pons (yellow card) 59'	Stadium: Alphamega Stadium; Referee: I. Bebek (Croatia)

2 April 2023 29	Apollon Limassol	0–1	Aris Limassol	Limassol
19:00 EEST (UTC+3)	Kyriakou (yellow card) 50'; Peybernes (yellow card) 50'; Warda (yellow card) 68'; Coll (yellow card) 85'	Report	Kokorin (yellow card) 43'; Yago (yellow card) 50'; Szöke (yellow card) 54', (goal) 73'; Struski (yellow card) 68'; Pileas (yellow card) 74'	Stadium: Alphamega Stadium; Referee: V. Pizarro (Spain)

11 April 2023 30	Omonia	0–3	Aris Limassol	Nicosia
19:00 EEST (UTC+3)	Diskerud (yellow card) 67'	Report	Boakye (yellow card) 14'; Bengtsson 26'; Babicka 79'; Brown 82'	Stadium: GSP Stadium; Referee: C. Theouli

23 April 2023 31	Aris Limassol	0–0	APOEL	Limassol
19:00 EEST (UTC+3)	Brorsson (yellow card) 11'; Struski (yellow card) 69'; Babicka (yellow card) 84'	Report	Sušić (yellow card) 15'; Sarfo (yellow card) 52'; Kostadinov (yellow card) 64'	Stadium: Alphamega Stadium; Referee: M. Di Bello (Italy)

1 May 2023 32	Aris Limassol	2–1	Pafos	Limassol
19:00 EEST (UTC+3)	Yago (yellow card) 19'; Kokorin (yellow card) 38', (goal) 85'; Babicka (yellow card) 45+1'; Gomis 63'; M. Špoljarić (yellow card) 79'; Szöke (yellow card) 90+5'	Report	Palacios (yellow card) 43'; Jairo 70'; Bajrić (yellow card) 90+3'	Stadium: Alphamega Stadium; Attendance: 3,214; Referee: M. Redder (Denmark)

6 May 2023 33	AEK Larnaca	1–1	Aris Limassol	Larnaca
18:00 EEST (UTC+3)	García (yellow card) 44' (yellow-red card) 77'; Kokorin 60' (o.g.)	Report	Szöke (yellow card) 27'; Kokorin 40'; Brown (yellow card) 59'; Pileas (yellow card) 80' (yellow-red card) 90+2'	Stadium: AEK Arena – Georgios Karapatakis; Attendance: 3,000; Referee: S. Putros (Denmark)

14 May 2023 34	Aris Limassol	2–0	Apollon Limassol	Limassol
19:00 EEST (UTC+3)	Mayambela 5'; Babicka 8', (yellow card) 79'; Bengtsson (yellow card) 59'; Delmiro (yellow card) 90+3'	Report	Warda (yellow card) 55'; Roberge (yellow card) 63'; Hussain (yellow card) 90+1'; Joosten (yellow card) 90+6'	Stadium: Tsirio Stadium; Attendance: 3,900; Referee: F. Verissimo (Portugal)

20 May 2023 35	Aris Limassol	1–0	Omonia	Limassol
19:00 EEST (UTC+3)	Gomis 32' (pen.); Bengtsson (yellow card) 45+1'	Report	Miletić (yellow card) 31'; Matthews (yellow card) 45+1'; Lang (yellow card) 90+4'	Stadium: Alphamega Stadium; Attendance: 3,000; Referee: A. Menelaos

27 May 2023 36	APOEL	4–3	Aris Limassol	Nicosia
19:00 EEST (UTC+3)	Kvilitaia (yellow card) 3'; Satsias 19' (pen.); Sarfo 23', 34', 49'	Report	Stępiński 12', 27'; Sikorski 30'; Delmiro (yellow card) 40'; Brown (yellow card) 45+3'; Caju (yellow card) 74'	Stadium: GSP Stadium; Attendance: 4,998; Referee: K. Athanassiou

=== Cypriot Cup ===
18 January 2023 Second round	APOEL	4–2	Aris Limassol	Nicosia
19:00 EET (UTC+2)	Kvilitaia 27', 37'; Dálcio 39'; Efrem 82'	Report	Stępiński 18'; Boakye 90+1'	Stadium: GSP Stadium

=== UEFA Europa Conference League ===
==== Qualifying ====
===== Second qualifying round =====
21 July 2022 First leg	Aris Limassol (Cyprus)	2–0	(Azerbaijan) Neftçi	Larnaca, Cyprus
20:30 EEST (UTC+3)	Brorsson (yellow card) 24'; Caju 53'; Gomis 66'	Report	Saief (yellow card) 31'; Donyoh (yellow card) 82'	Stadium: AEK Arena – Georgios Karapatakis; Attendance: 1,371; Referee: Ivan Bebek (Croatia); Assistant referees: Goran Pataki (Croatia), Luka Pajić (Croatia); Fourth official: Dario Bel (Croatia)

28 July 2022 Second leg	Neftçi (Azerbaijan)	3–0 (3–2 agg.)	(Cyprus) Aris Limassol	Baku, Azerbaijan
21:00 AZT (UTC+4)	Salahlı (yellow card) 25'; Stanković (yellow card) 32'; Donyoh 38'; Eddy 57'; Saief 62'; Yusifli (yellow card) 90+2'	Report	Szöke (yellow card) 4'; Brorsson (yellow card) 6'; Brown (yellow card) 40' (yellow-red card) 82'; Delmiro (yellow card) 59'; Shpilevsky (yellow card) 88' (manager); Dede-Lhomme (yellow card) 90+7'	Stadium: Bakcell Arena; Attendance: 9,500; Referee: Bastian Dankert (Germany); Assistant referees: Jan Seidel (Germany), Eduard Beitinger (Germany); Fourth official: Sven Jablonski (Germany)
Note: Neftçi won 3–2 on aggregate.
