= 2024–25 APOEL FC season =

APOEL FC
2024–25 season
- Head coach: David Gallego (until 24 August); Manolo Jiménez (12 October–2 March)
- Stadium: GSP Stadium
- Cypriot First Division: 5th
- Cypriot Cup: Quarter-finals
- Cypriot Super Cup: Winners
- UEFA Champions League: Third qualifying round
- UEFA Europa League: Play-off round
- UEFA Conference League: Knockout phase play-offs
- Top goalscorer: League: Youssef El-Arabi (13 goals); All: Youssef El-Arabi (14 goals)
- Average home league attendance: 6,922
Home colours	Away colours	Third colours

The 2024–25 season was the 98th season in the history of APOEL FC, and the club's 24th consecutive season in the Cypriot First Division. In addition to the domestic league, the team participated in the Cypriot Cup, Cypriot Super Cup, the UEFA Champions League, the UEFA Europa League, and the UEFA Conference League.

== Transfers ==
=== In ===
Pos.	Player	Transferred from	Fee	Date	Source
MF	(Brazil) Vitor Meer	(Brazil) Corinthians U20	Loan	1 July 2024	
MF	(Romania) Marius Corbu	(Hungary) Puskás Akadémia	Undisclosed	8 July 2024	
FW	(Morocco) Youssef El-Arabi	Free agent	Free	12 July 2024	
MF	(Spain) Iván Alejo	(Spain) Cádiz	Loan	1 January 2025	
FW	(Cyprus) Pieros Sotiriou	(Japan) Sanfrecce Hiroshima	Free	5 January 2025	

=== Out ===
Pos.	Player	Transferred to	Fee	Date	Source
FW	(Portugal) Tomané	(Portugal) Farense	End of contract	1 July 2024	
MF	(Argentina) Lucas Villafáñez	(Greece) Volos	End of contract	1 July 2024	
FW	(Angola) Wilson Eduardo	(Portugal) Alverca	End of contract	1 July 2024	
MF	(Guinea-Bissau) Dálcio	(Serbia) Red Star Belgrade	End of contract	1 July 2024	
MF	(Cyprus) Stylianos Vrontis	(Cyprus) Omonia Aradippou	Loan	19 July 2024	
FW	(Cyprus) Stavros Georgiou	(Cyprus) Doxa Katokopias	Loan	20 July 2024	
MF	(Democratic Republic of the Congo) Dieumerci Ndongala	(Turkey) Bandırmaspor	Undisclosed	5 January 2025	

== Friendlies ==
=== Pre-season ===
30 June 2024 Friendly	FK Spartak Subotica (Serbia)	1–2	(Cyprus) APOEL	Užice, Serbia
18:00	Todoroski 74' (pen.)		Kostadinov 19'; Ben Nabouhane 40' (pen.)	Stadium: Stadion Radomir Antić

4 July 2024 Friendly	FK Novi Pazar (Serbia)	2–2	(Cyprus) APOEL	Zlatibor, Serbia
18:00				Stadium: Stadion Švajcarija

9 July 2024 Friendly	FK Radnički 1923 (Serbia)	1–1	(Cyprus) APOEL	Užice, Serbia
18:00				Stadium: Stadion Radomir Antić

17 July 2024 Friendly	AEK Larnaca (Cyprus)	0–0	(Cyprus) APOEL
18:00

== Competitions ==
=== Overall record ===
Competition	First match	Last match	Starting round	Final position	Record							
Competition	First match	Last match	Starting round	Final position	Pld	W	D	L	GF	GA	GD	Win %
Cypriot First Division	1 September 2024		Matchday 1		11	6	2	3	23	7	+16	54.55
Cypriot Cup					0	0	0	0	0	0	+0	—
Cypriot Super Cup			Final		0	0	0	0	0	0	+0	—
UEFA Champions League	23 July 2024	13 August 2024	Second qualifying round	Third qualifying round	4	1	2	1	2	3	−1	25.00
UEFA Europa League	22 August 2024	29 August 2024	Play-off round	Play-off round	2	1	0	1	3	3	+0	50.00
UEFA Conference League	3 October 2024		League phase		3	1	1	1	3	3	+0	33.33
Total					20	9	5	6	31	16	+15	45.00

Last updated: 29 August 2024
Source: Soccerway

=== Cypriot First Division ===
==== League table ====
Pos	Team	Pld	W	D	L	GF	GA	GD	Pts	Qualification or relegation
3	AEK Larnaca	26	16	6	4	45	21	+24	54	Qualification for the Championship round
4	Omonia	26	16	4	6	53	26	+27	52	Qualification for the Championship round
5	APOEL	26	12	7	7	52	25	+27	43	Qualification for the Championship round
6	Apollon Limassol	26	11	7	8	28	23	+5	40	Qualification for the Championship round
7	Anorthosis Famagusta	26	10	7	9	34	33	+1	37	Qualification for the Relegation round

Source: Soccerway
Rules for classification: 1) Points; 2) Head-to-head points; 3) Head-to-head goal difference; 4) Head-to-head goals scored; 5) Head-to-head away goals scored (only if two teams); 6) Goal difference; 7) Goals scored; 8) Play-off (only if deciding championship round, relegation round or relegation).

Pos	Team	Pld	W	D	L	GF	GA	GD	Pts	Qualification	PAF	ARI	OMO	AEK	APO	APL
1	Pafos (C)	36	26	4	6	67	21	+46	82	Qualification for the Champions League second qualifying round	—	4–0	3–1	2–0	0–1	2–0
2	Aris Limassol	36	22	9	5	66	31	+35	75	Qualification for the Conference League second qualifying round	0–1	—	3–3	1–0	1–0	2–1
3	Omonia	36	20	8	8	69	40	+29	68	Qualification for the Conference League second qualifying round	3–0	2–1	—	1–1	2–1	1–0
4	AEK Larnaca	36	19	11	6	58	30	+28	68	Qualification for the Europa League first qualifying round (Note: The winner of the 2024–25 Cypriot Cup (AEK Larnaca) qualified for the Europa League first qualifying round.)	2–2	1–1	1–1	—	3–0	3–0
5	APOEL	36	14	11	11	59	36	+23	53		1–1	2–1	1–1	0–1	—	1–1
6	Apollon Limassol	36	12	10	14	37	39	−2	46		1–2	2–3	3–1	1–1	0–0	—

Source: Soccerway
Legend: Blue = home team win; Yellow = draw; Red = away team win.
Rules for classification: 1) Points; 2) Head-to-head points; 3) Head-to-head goal difference; 4) Head-to-head goals scored; 5) Head-to-head away goals scored (only if two teams); 6) Goal difference; 7) Goals scored; 8) Play-off (only if deciding championship round, relegation round or relegation).
(C) Champions
Notes:

Pos	Team	Pld	W	D	L	GF	GA	GD	Pts	Relegation	ANO	ETH	AEL	ENO	OAR	KAR	NEA	PAC
1	Anorthosis Famagusta	33	15	7	11	50	42	+8	52		—	2–0	—	1–2	1–2	—	—	4–2
2	Ethnikos Achna	33	9	12	12	44	53	−9	39		—	—	2–0	—	—	2–1	1–1	3–1
3	AEL Limassol	33	11	6	16	38	53	−15	39		1–3	—	—	2–0	—	1–0	—	—
4	Enosis Neon Paralimni	33	10	5	18	31	48	−17	35		—	4–2	—	—	1–0	—	2–2	—
5	Omonia Aradippou	33	10	5	18	32	58	−26	35		—	2–1	1–2	—	—	—	0–2	4–1
6	Karmiotissa (R)	33	9	7	17	30	57	−27	34	Relegation to the Cypriot Second Division	0–1	—	—	0–2	1–0	—	—	2–0
7	Nea Salamis Famagusta (R)	33	6	8	19	31	62	−31	26	Relegation to the Cypriot Second Division	2–4	—	1–3	—	—	0–0	—	—
8	Omonia 29M (R)	33	3	5	25	23	65	−42	14	Relegation to the Cypriot Second Division	—	—	0–3	0–2	—	—	0–1	—

Source: Soccerway
Legend: Blue = home team win; Yellow = draw; Red = away team win.
Rules for classification: 1) Points; 2) Head-to-head points; 3) Head-to-head goal difference; 4) Head-to-head goals scored; 5) Head-to-head away goals scored (only if two teams); 6) Goal difference; 7) Goals scored; 8) Play-off (only if deciding championship round, relegation round or relegation).
(R) Relegated

==== Matches ====
24 August 2024 1	Enosis Neon Paralimni	v	APOEL

1 September 2024 2	APOEL	v	Ethnikos	Strovolos
20:00 UTC+3				Stadium: GSP Stadium

=== Cypriot Super Cup ===
25 September 2024 Final	APOEL	1–0	Pafos	Limassol, Cyprus
18:30	Sarfo 1'; Tejera (yellow card) 17'; Chebake (yellow card) 43'; Petrović (yellow card) 64'; Marquinhos (yellow card) 86'; Bah (yellow card) 89'	Report	Luckassen (yellow card) 8'; Dragomir (red card) 12'; Tanković (yellow card) 36'; Anderson Silva (yellow card) 90+4'	Stadium: Alphamega Stadium

=== UEFA Champions League ===
==== Second qualifying round ====
The draw was held on 19 June 2024.

23 July 2024 First leg	APOEL (Cyprus)	1–0	(Moldova) Petrocub Hîncești	Strovolos, Cyprus
20:00 UTC+3	Marquinhos 38' (pen.); Tejera (yellow card) 77'	Report	Plătică (yellow card) 12'; Abagna (yellow card) 20'; Borș (yellow card) 37'; Lungu (yellow card) 50'; Douanla (yellow card) 62'; Plătică (yellow card) 87'	Stadium: GSP Stadium; Attendance: 13,801; Referee: Robert Schröder (Germany)

30 July 2024 Second leg	Petrocub Hîncești (Moldova)	1–1 (1–2 agg.)	(Cyprus) APOEL	Chișinău, Moldova
20:00 UTC+3	Plătică 60'	Report	Marquinhos 65'	Stadium: Zimbru Stadium; Attendance: 7,500; Referee: Fedayi San (Switzerland)

==== Third qualifying round ====
The draw was held on 22 July 2024.

7 August 2024 First leg	Slovan Bratislava (Slovakia)	2–0	(Cyprus) APOEL	Bratislava, Slovakia
20:30 UTC+2	Petrović 74' (o.g.); Mak 90+3'	Report		Stadium: Tehelné pole Attendance: 20,404; Referee: Allard Lindhout (Netherlands)

13 August 2024 Second leg	APOEL (Cyprus)	0–0 (0–2 agg.)	(Slovakia) Slovan Bratislava	Nicosia, Cyprus
20:00 UTC+3		Report		Stadium: GSP Stadium; Attendance: 13,507; Referee: Sascha Stegemann (Germany)

=== UEFA Europa League ===
==== Play-off round ====
The draw was held on 5 August 2024.

22 August 2024 First leg	RFS (Latvia)	2–1	(Cyprus) APOEL	Riga, Latvia
20:00 UTC+3	Kouadio 31'; Ikaunieks 45+1' (pen.)	Report	El-Arabi 52'	Stadium: LNK Sporta Parks; Attendance: 1,678; Referee: Aliyar Aghayev (Azerbaijan)

29 August 2024 Second leg	APOEL (Cyprus)	2–1 (a.e.t.) (3–3 agg.) (2–4 p)	(Latvia) RFS	Nicosia, Cyprus
20:00 UTC+3	Sušić 75'; Donis 90+5'	Report	Ikaunieks 40'	Stadium: GSP Stadium; Attendance: 12,998; Referee: Matej Jug (Slovenia)
	Penalties
	El-Arabi (penalty scored); Sarfo (penalty missed); Quintillà (penalty scored); Dvali (penalty missed)		(penalty scored) Ikaunieks; (penalty scored) Lipušček; (penalty scored) Prenga; (penalty scored) Panić

=== UEFA Conference League ===
==== League phase ====
The league phase draw was held on 30 August 2024.

Pos	Team	Pld	W	D	L	GF	GA	GD	Pts	Qualification
9	(Polish Football Association) Jagiellonia Białystok	6	3	2	1	10	5	+5	11	Advance to knockout phase play-offs (seeded)
10	(Football Association of Ireland) Shamrock Rovers	6	3	2	1	12	9	+3	11	Advance to knockout phase play-offs (seeded)
11	(Cyprus Football Association) APOEL	6	3	2	1	8	5	+3	11	Advance to knockout phase play-offs (seeded)
12	(Cyprus Football Association) Pafos	6	3	1	2	11	7	+4	10	Advance to knockout phase play-offs (seeded)
13	(Hellenic Football Federation) Panathinaikos	6	3	1	2	10	7	+3	10	Advance to knockout phase play-offs (seeded)

Source: UEFA
Rules for classification: League phase tiebreakers

Round	1	2	3	4	5	6
Ground	A	H	H	A	A	H
Result	D	L	W	W	W	D
Position	18	26	17	13	10	11
Points	1	1	4	7	10	11

Source: UEFA
A = Away; H = Home; W = Win; D = Draw; L = Loss

Win Draw Loss Fixtures

3 October 2024 1	Shamrock Rovers (Republic of Ireland)	1–1	(Cyprus) APOEL	Tallaght Stadium, Dublin
21:00 (20:00 UTC+1)	Watts 90+2'	Report	Laifis 59'	Attendance: 7,111; Referee: Jérémie Pignard (France)

24 October 2024 2	APOEL (Cyprus)	0–1	(Bosnia and Herzegovina) Borac Banja Luka	GSP Stadium, Nicosia
18:45 (19:45 UTC+3)		Report	Savić 63'	Attendance: 9,173; Referee: Robert Jones (England)

7 November 2024 3	APOEL (Cyprus)	2–1	(Italy) Fiorentina	GSP Stadium, Nicosia
21:00 (22:00 UTC+2)	Donis 37'; Abagna 45+1'	Report	Ikoné 74'	Attendance: 9,300; Referee: François Letexier (France)

28 November 2024 4	Molde (Norway)	0–1	(Cyprus) APOEL	Aker Stadion, Molde
18:45		Report	Laifis 41'	Attendance: 2,916; Referee: Damian Sylwestrzak (Poland)

12 December 2024 5	Noah (Armenia)	1–3	(Cyprus) APOEL	Vazgen Sargsyan Republican Stadium, Yerevan (Note: Noah played their home matches at Vazgen Sargsyan Republican Stadium, Yerevan, instead of their regular stadium, Armavir City Stadium, Armavir, which did not meet UEFA requirements.)
18:45 (21:45 UTC+4)	Aiás 45+4'	Report	Chebake 23'; Kostadinov 89'; Abagna 90+3'	Attendance: 7,500; Referee: Miloš Milanović (Serbia)

19 December 2024 6	APOEL (Cyprus)	1–1	(Kazakhstan) Astana	GSP Stadium, Nicosia
21:00 (22:00 UTC+2)	Donis 56'	Report	Kažukolovas 64'	Attendance: 11,181; Referee: Sebastian Gishamer (Austria)

==== Knockout phase play-offs ====
The draw for the Knockout phase play-offs was held on 20 December 2024.

13 February 2025 First leg	Celje (Slovenia)	2–2	(Cyprus) APOEL FC	Stadion Z'dežele, Celje
18:45	Kučys 2', 59'	Report	Abagna 32'; Laifis 70'	Attendance: 4,050; Referee: Mykola Balakin (Ukraine)

20 February 2025 Second leg	APOEL (Cyprus)	0–2 (2–4 agg.)	(Slovenia) Celje	GSP Stadium, Nicosia
21:00 (22:00 UTC+2)		Report	Kučys 45+4'; Svetlin 51'	Attendance: 9,108; Referee: John Beaton (Scotland)
