= 2023–24 APOEL FC season =

APOEL
2023–24 season
- Chairman: Prodromos Petrides
- Manager: Ricardo Sá Pinto
- Stadium: GSP Stadium, Nicosia
- Cypriot First Division: 1st (champions)
- Cypriot Cup: Second round
- UEFA Conference League: Play-off round
- Top goalscorer: League: Marquinhos (10); All: Marquinhos (10)
Home colours	Away colours	Third colours

The 2023–24 season was APOEL's 84th season in the Cypriot First Division and 96th year in existence as a football club. In addition to the domestic league, APOEL participated in this season's editions of the Cypriot Cup and the Conference League. The season covers the period from 1 July 2023 to 30 June 2024.

== Kits ==
- Supplier: Macron
- Sponsor:: Stoiximan

Home	Away

== Management team ==
=== Coaching staff ===
As of 11 July 2023

Position	Name
Head Coach	(Portugal) Ricardo Sá Pinto
Assistant coaches	(Portugal) José Dominguez, (Portugal) Nuno Morais
Analysts	(Portugal) João Abreu, (Cyprus) Neophytos Charalambous
Fitness coach	(Portugal) Paulo Miguel dos Santos
Goalkeeping coach	(Greece) Giorgos Skiathitis
Head of Scouting Department	(Bulgaria) Ivan Slavov

=== Personnel ===
Position	Name
General manager	(Cyprus) Efthymios Agathokleous
Football Director	
Financial Controller	(Cyprus) Alexis Demetriou
Operations Manager	(Cyprus) Marios Christodoulou
Marketing manager	(Greece) George Lykouris
Youth Academies General Manager	(Cyprus) George Markides
Head of Communications Department	(Cyprus) Nectarios Petevinos
Team manager	(Cyprus) George Savvides
Accountant	(Cyprus) Antigoni Lambrou

=== Medical staff ===
Position	Name
Head of medical department	(Russia) Alexander Rezepov
Head of physiotherapy dept.	(Cyprus) Marios Siamaris
Physiotherapist	(Bulgaria) Georgi Gospodinov
Masseur	(Greece) Evangelos Kanellos
Nutritionist	(Cyprus) Chrisostomos Iliadis
Caregivers	(Cyprus) Costas Stefanou, (Cyprus) Christos Stefanou, (Cyprus) Damith Poddivala

== Current squad ==
As of 8 July 2023

Note: Flags indicate national team as defined under FIFA eligibility rules; some limited exceptions apply. Players may hold more than one non-FIFA nationality.

No.	Pos.	Nation	Player
4	DF	CYP	Andreas Karamanolis (on loan from Doxa Katokopias)
5	DF	GEO	Lasha Dvali
6	DF	BRA	Jefté (on loan from Fluminense)
7	FW	CYP	Georgios Efrem
8	MF	NGA	Fawaz Abdullahi
9	FW	ANG	Wilson Eduardo
10	MF	ARG	Lucas Villafáñez
11	FW	GEO	Giorgi Kvilitaia
14	DF	MAR	Issam Chebake
15	DF	ESP	José Ángel Crespo
16	DF	BIH	Mateo Sušić
17	MF	CYP	Dimitris Theodorou
18	MF	CYP	Giannis Satsias
20	MF	GNB	Dálcio
21	FW	POR	Tomané

No.	Pos.	Nation	Player
22	GK	CYP	Andreas Christodoulou
25	FW	CYP	Stavros Gavriel
27	GK	SVN	Vid Belec
28	MF	GRE	Giannis Fetfatzidis
31	FW	COM	Ben Nabouhane
35	MF	CYP	Paris Polykarpou
36	FW	BRA	Marquinhos
43	DF	CYP	David Djamas
44	MF	GHA	Kingsley Sarfo
70	MF	BUL	Georgi Kostadinov
74	FW	CYP	Stavros Georgiou
76	MF	CYP	Stelios Vrontis
77	FW	COD	Dieumerci Ndongala
78	GK	CYP	Stefanos Kittos
90	FW	POR	Rafael Moreira
—	MF	IRN	Saeid Mehri

=== Out on loan ===
Note: Flags indicate national team as defined under FIFA eligibility rules; some limited exceptions apply. Players may hold more than one non-FIFA nationality.

No.	Pos.	Nation	Player
—	FW	CYP	Nikolas Koutsakos (at Achyronas-Onisilos until 31 May 2024)
—	MF	BRA	Carlos Dias (at Fujairah FC until 31 May 2024)
—	MF	GAM	Suleyman Sohna Andreou (at MEAP Nisou until 31 May 2024)

== Competitions ==
=== Overview ===
Competition	Starting round	Final position	Record							
Competition	Starting round	Final position	Pld	W	D	L	GF	GA	GD	Win %
Cypriot First Division	Matchday 1	TBD					—			
Cypriot Cup	Round of 18	TBD					—			
Total			0	0	0	0	0	0	+0	—

Last updated: 01 July 2023
Source: Competitions

=== Cypriot First Division ===
==== Regular season ====
===== League table =====
Pos	Team	Pld	W	D	L	GF	GA	GD	Pts	Qualification or relegation
1	APOEL	26	18	5	3	54	16	+38	59	Qualification for the Championship round
2	Aris Limassol	26	18	2	6	53	21	+32	56	Qualification for the Championship round
3	AEK Larnaca	26	15	7	4	44	26	+18	52	Qualification for the Championship round
4	Pafos	26	15	5	6	48	20	+28	50	Qualification for the Championship round
5	Omonia	26	14	7	5	49	30	+19	49	Qualification for the Championship round
6	Anorthosis Famagusta	26	14	5	7	38	23	+15	47	Qualification for the Championship round
7	Apollon Limassol	26	10	8	8	37	27	+10	38	Qualification for the Relegation round
8	Nea Salamis Famagusta	26	10	6	10	34	39	−5	36	Qualification for the Relegation round
9	AEL Limassol	26	9	3	14	34	45	−11	30	Qualification for the Relegation round
10	Ethnikos Achna	26	6	8	12	39	56	−17	26	Qualification for the Relegation round
11	Karmiotissa	26	5	5	16	31	53	−22	20	Qualification for the Relegation round
12	AEZ Zakakiou	26	2	10	14	28	59	−31	16	Qualification for the Relegation round
13	Othellos Athienou	26	3	6	17	20	52	−32	15	Qualification for the Relegation round
14	Doxa Katokopias	26	3	3	20	14	56	−42	12	Qualification for the Relegation round

Source: Soccerway
Rules for classification: 1) Points; 2) Head-to-head points; 3) Head-to-head goal difference; 4) Head-to-head goals scored; 5) Head-to-head away goals scored (only if two teams); 6) Goal difference; 7) Goals scored; 8) Play-off (only if deciding championship round, relegation round or relegation).

=== UEFA Europa Conference League ===
==== Second qualifying round ====
27 July 2023 First leg	APOEL (Cyprus)	2–1	(Serbia) Vojvodina	GSP Stadium, Nicosia
19:00 (20:00 EEST)	Kvilitaia 32'; Dvali 65'	Report	Zukić 56'	Attendance: 12,024; Referee: Don Robertson (Scotland)

3 August 2023 Second leg	Vojvodina (Serbia)	1–2 (2–4 agg.)	(Cyprus) APOEL	Karađorđe Stadium, Novi Sad
20:00	Zukić 37'	Report	Sarfo 27'; Efrem 74' (pen.)	Attendance: 6,705; Referee: Vitālijs Spasjoņņikovs (Latvia)

==== Third qualifying round ====
10 August 2023 First leg	Dila Gori (Georgia (country))	0–2	(Cyprus) APOEL	Boris Paichadze Dinamo Arena, Tbilisi (Note: Dila Gori played their third qualifying round home match at the Boris Paichadze Dinamo Arena in Tbilisi, instead of their regular stadium, the Tengiz Burjanadze Stadium in Gori, which does not meet UEFA requirements.)
19:00 (21:00 GET)		Report	Crespo 45+1'; Efrem 64'	Attendance: 8,593; Referee: Jasmin Sabotic (Luxembourg)

17 August 2023 Second leg	APOEL (Cyprus)	1–0 (3–0 agg.)	(Georgia (country)) Dila Gori	GSP Stadium, Nicosia
19:00 (20:00 EEST)	Ndongala 48'	Report		Attendance: 11,853; Referee: Robert Ian Jenkins (Wales)

==== Play-off round ====
24 August 2023 First leg	Gent (Belgium)	2–0	(Cyprus) APOEL	Ghelamco Arena, Ghent
20:00	Fofana 77'; Hong Hyun-seok 90+2'	Report		Attendance: 10,855; Referee: Sven Jablonski (Germany)

31 August 2023 Second leg	APOEL (Cyprus)	1–2 (1–4 agg.)	(Belgium) Gent	GSP Stadium, Nicosia
19:00 (20:00 EEST)	Roef 90+5' (o.g.)	Report	Samoise 29'; Tissoudali 79'	Attendance: 14,100; Referee: Rohit Saggi (Norway)
