= List of football stadiums in Cyprus =

The following is a list of football stadiums in Cyprus, ordered by capacity. Stadiums in bold are part of the 2022–23 Cypriot First Division.

== Current stadiums ==
#	Image	Stadium	Capacity	City	District	Home team	Opened	UEFA rank
1		**GSP Stadium**	22,859	Strovolos	Nicosia	APOEL and Omonia	1999	4/4 stars
2		**Makario Stadium**	15,590	Engomi	Nicosia	Digenis Akritas Morphou, Ethnikos Assia, Iraklis Gerolakkou and Olympiakos Nicosia	1978	
3		**Tsirio Stadium**	13,331	Limassol	Limassol	Karmiotissa Polemidion	1975	
4		GSZ Stadium	13,032	Larnaca	Larnaca	ASIL	1983	
5		**Alphamega Stadium**	10,700	Kolossi	Limassol	AEL, Apollon and Aris	2022	4/4 stars
6		**Stelios Kyriakides Stadium**	9,394	Paphos	Paphos	Akritas Chlorakas and Pafos FC	1985	
7		**Antonis Papadopoulos Stadium**	9,230	Larnaca	Larnaca	Anorthosis	1986	3/4 stars
8		**AEK Arena**	8,058	Larnaca	Larnaca	AEK Larnaca	2016	4/4 stars
9		**Tasos Markou Stadium**	5,800	Paralimni	Famagusta	Enosis Neon Paralimni	1996	
10		**Ammochostos Stadium**	5,500	Larnaca	Larnaca	Nea Salamis Famagusta	1992	
11		Dasaki Stadium	5,422	Achna	Famagusta	Ethnikos Achna and PO Xylotymbou 2006	1976	
12		Peyia Municipal Stadium	3,828	Pegeia	Paphos	Peyia 2014		
13		**Katokopia Stadium**	3,500	Peristerona	Nicosia	Doxa Katokopias	1978	

== See also ==
- List of European stadiums by capacity
- List of association football stadiums by capacity
- Lists of stadiums
