= Július Szöke =

Slovak footballer

Personal information
- Date of birth: 1 August 1995 (age 31)
- Place of birth: Hnúšťa, Slovakia
- Height: 1.82 m (6 ft 0 in)
- Position: Midfielder

Team information
- Current team: AEL Limassol
- Number: 37

Youth career
- 2007–2010: FK Iskra Hnúšťa
- 2010–2012: ŽP Šport Podbrezová

Senior career*
Years	Team	Apps	(Gls)
2012–2016	ŽP Šport Podbrezová	30	(1)
2014	→ Ružomberok (loan)	8	(0)
2014–2015	→ ViOn Zlaté Moravce (loan)	21	(0)
2016–2017	Shakhter Karagandy	55	(5)
2018–2021	Shakhtyor Soligorsk	101	(6)
2022	Ironi Kiryat Shmona	14	(0)
2022–2024	Aris Limassol	62	(2)
2024–2025	Slovan Bratislava	15	(0)
2025–	AEL Limassol	22	(0)

International career^{‡}
2013–2014	Slovakia U19	3	(0)
2015	Slovakia U21	1	(0)
- * Club domestic league appearances and goals as of 17 April 2026 ‡ National team caps and goals as of 28 March 2017

Július Szöke (born 1 August 1995) is a Slovak professional footballer who plays as a midfielder for AEL Limassol.

== Club career ==
Szöke made his Fortuna Liga debut for Ružomberok against MŠK Žilina on 22 March 2014.

== International career ==
Szöke, then-aged 26, was first recognised in a senior national team nomination on 16 March 2022 by Štefan Tarkovič as an alternate ahead of two international friendly fixtures against Norway and Finland.

== Career statistics ==
As of match played 10 May 2025

Appearances and goals by club, season and competition
Club	Season	League			National cup		Europe		Other		Total	
Club	Season	Division	Apps	Goals	Apps	Goals	Apps	Goals	Apps	Goals	Apps	Goals
ŽP Šport Podbrezová	2012–13	2. Liga	12	1	—		—		—		12	1
ŽP Šport Podbrezová	2013–14	2. Liga	8	0	—		—		—		8	0
ŽP Šport Podbrezová	2015–16	Slovak First Football League	10	0	—		—		—		10	0
ŽP Šport Podbrezová	Total		30	1	—		—		—		30	1
Ružomberok (loan)	2013–14	Slovak First Football League	8	0	1	0	—		—		9	0
ViOn Zlaté Moravce (loan)	2014–15	Slovak First Football League	21	0	1	0	—		—		22	0
Shakhter Karagandy	2016	Kazakhstan Premier League	29	3	0	0	—		—		29	3
Shakhter Karagandy	2017	Kazakhstan Premier League	26	2	3	1	—		—		29	3
Shakhter Karagandy	Total		55	5	3	1	—		—		58	6
Shakhtyor Soligorsk	2018	Belarusian Premier League	28	2	3	0	4 (Note: Appearances in UEFA Europa League)	0	—		35	2
Shakhtyor Soligorsk	2019	Belarusian Premier League	26	1	4	0	5	0	—		35	1
Shakhtyor Soligorsk	2020	Belarusian Premier League	24	2	5	1	1	0	—		30	3
Shakhtyor Soligorsk	2021	Belarusian Premier League	23	1	4	0	2 (Note: Appearances in UEFA Conference League)	0	—		29	1
Shakhtyor Soligorsk	Total		101	6	16	1	12	0	—		129	7
Ironi Kiryat Shmona	2021–22	Israeli Premier League	14	0	1	0	—		—		15	0
Aris Limassol	2022–23	Cypriot First Division	31	2	1	0	2	0	—		34	2
Aris Limassol	2023–24	Cypriot First Division	31	0	2	0	11 (Note: Three appearances in UEFA Champions League, eight appearances and one goal in UEFA Europa League)	1	1 (Note: Appearance in Cypriot Super Cup)	0	45	1
Aris Limassol	Total		62	2	3	0	13	1	1	0	79	3
Slovan Bratislava	2024–25	Slovak First Football League	17	0	5	0	10 (Note: Appearances in UEFA Champions League)	0	—		32	0
AEL Limassol	2025–26	Cypriot First Division	0	0	0	0	0	0	0	0	0	0
Career total			306	14	30	2	35	1	1	0	372	17

== Honours ==
Shakhtyor Soligorsk

- Belarusian Premier League: 2020
- Belarusian Cup: 2018–19
