= Karol Struski =

Polish footballer

Personal information
- Full name: Karol Struski
- Date of birth: 18 January 2001 (age 25)
- Place of birth: Lublin, Poland
- Height: 1.78 m (5 ft 10 in)
- Position: Midfielder

Team information
- Current team: Raków Częstochowa
- Number: 23

Youth career
- 2010–2017: Górnik Łęczna
- 2017–2020: Jagiellonia Białystok

Senior career*
Years	Team	Apps	(Gls)
2020–2022	Jagiellonia Białystok	30	(1)
2020–2021	→ Górnik Łęczna (loan)	27	(1)
2022–2025	Aris Limassol	86	(11)
2025–	Raków Częstochowa	22	(0)

International career^{‡}
2021–2022	Poland U20	7	(1)
2023	Poland	1	(0)
- * Club domestic league appearances and goals as of 21:56, 28 August 2026 (UTC) ‡ National team caps and goals as of 21:45, 21 November 2023 (UTC)

Karol Struski (born 18 January 2001) is a Polish professional footballer who plays as a midfielder for Ekstraklasa club Raków Częstochowa.

== Club career ==
Struski played for Górnik Łęczna from 2010 until 2017, when he joined Jagiellonia Białystok. He started his senior career there before returning to Górnik on a year loan in 2020. In mid-2022, Struski joined Cypriot side Aris Limassol.

In June 2025, Struski joined Raków Częstochowa on a four-year deal for a reported fee of €1 million.

== International career ==
Having played for Poland U-20 national team, Struski received his first senior team call-up on 13 November 2023 for a UEFA Euro 2024 qualifying match against Czech Republic and a friendly against Latvia, debuting in the latter match as a substitute.

== Career statistics ==
=== Club ===
As of match played 27 August 2026

Appearances and goals by club, season and competition
Club	Season	League			National cup (Note: Includes Polish Cup, Cypriot Cup)		Europe		Other		Total	
Club	Season	Division	Apps	Goals	Apps	Goals	Apps	Goals	Apps	Goals	Apps	Goals
Jagiellonia Białystok	2019–20	Ekstraklasa	2	0	0	0	—		—		2	0
Jagiellonia Białystok	2021–22	Ekstraklasa	28	1	1	0	—		—		29	1
Jagiellonia Białystok	Total		30	1	1	0	—		—		31	1
Górnik Łęczna (loan)	2020–21	I liga	27	1	2	0	—		—		29	1
Aris Limassol	2022–23	Cypriot First Division	29	4	1	0	—		—		30	4
Aris Limassol	2023–24	Cypriot First Division	23	2	0	0	12 (Note: Four appearances in UEFA Champions League, eight appearances in UEFA Europa League)	0	—		35	2
Aris Limassol	2024–25	Cypriot First Division	34	5	1	0	—		—		35	5
Aris Limassol	Total		86	11	2	0	12	0	—		100	11
Raków Częstochowa	2025–26	Ekstraklasa	21	0	3	0	10 (Note: Appearances in UEFA Conference League)	1	—		34	1
Raków Częstochowa	2026–27	Ekstraklasa	1	0	0	0	2	0	—		3	0
Raków Częstochowa	Total		22	0	3	0	12	0	—		37	1
Career total			165	13	8	0	24	1	0	0	197	14

=== International ===
As of match played 21 November 2023

Appearances and goals by national team and year
National team	Year	Apps	Goals
Poland	2023	1	0
Total		1	0

== Honours ==
Aris Limassol

- Cypriot First Division: 2022–23
- Cypriot Super Cup: 2023
