= Morgan Brown (footballer, born 1999) =

English association football player

Personal information
- Full name: Morgan Lea Brown
- Date of birth: 29 November 1999 (age 26)
- Place of birth: Leicester, England
- Height: 6 ft 0 in (1.82 m)
- Position: Midfielder

Team information
- Current team: Apollon Limassol
- Number: 5

Youth career
- 2007–2018: Leicester City
- 2018–2019: Aberdeen

Senior career*
Years	Team	Apps	(Gls)
2019	Stratford Town	2	(0)
2019–2025	Aris Limassol	128	(6)
2025–	Apollon Limassol	35	(0)

International career^{‡}
2026–	Cyprus	1	(0)
- * Club domestic league appearances and goals as of 11:22, 7 November 2026 (UTC) ‡ National team caps and goals as of 15 November 2026

Morgan Lea Brown (born 29 November 1999) is a professional footballer who plays as a midfielder for Apollon Limassol. Born in England, he represents the Cyprus national team.

== Career ==
=== Leicester ===
Brown was born in Leicester and joined the academy of local side Leicester City at the age of 7.

=== Aberdeen ===
In August 2018, he joined Scottish Premiership side Aberdeen after impressing on trial. He made one appearance for Aberdeen U21s in the Scottish Challenge Cup in a 3–1 loss to Raith Rovers.

=== Stratford Town ===
In July 2019, he joined Southern League Premier Division Central side Stratford Town. He made two league appearances for the club before leaving.

=== Aris Limassol ===
He joined the Cyprus team Aris Limassol in August 2019 before the league season was interrupted due to COVID-19 pandemic. He played 19 games for Aris Limassol in the 2021–22 season and did not contribute to a goal. In June 2022, he renewed his contract with Aris Limassol and signed for three years. He received the award for the best goal of the 11th week of the season. In May 2023, he helped lead Aris to their first ever Cypriot First Division title.

=== Apollon Limassol ===
Brown joined Apollon Limassol on a two-year contract ahead of the 2025–26 season.

== International career ==
Brown gained Cypriot nationality in June 2026. He was called up to the Cyprus national team in November 2026.

== Career statistics ==
As of match played 31 October 2026

Appearances and goals by club, season and competition
Club	Season	League			Cup (Note: Includes Cypriot Cup)		Europe		Other		Total	
Club	Season	Division	Apps	Goals	Apps	Goals	Apps	Goals	Apps	Goals	Apps	Goals
Aberdeen U21	2018–19	–							1 (Note: Appearance(s) in Scottish Challenge Cup)	0	1	0
Stratford Town	2019–20	SFL Premier Division Central	2	0	0	0	—		—		2	0
Aris Limassol	2019–20	Cypriot Second Division	14	0	0	0	—		—		14	0
Aris Limassol	2020–21	Cypriot Second Division	30	0	2	0	—		—		32	0
Aris Limassol	2021–22	Cypriot First Division	19	0	0	0	—		—		19	0
Aris Limassol	2022–23	Cypriot First Division	30	3	1	0	2	0	—		33	3
Aris Limassol	2023–24	Cypriot First Division	28	2	3	0	9	1	1 (Note: Appearance(s) in Cypriot Super Cup)	0	41	3
Aris Limassol	2024–25	Cypriot First Division	7	1	1	1	—		—		8	2
Aris Limassol	Total		128	6	7	1	11	1	1	0	147	7
Apollon Limassol	2025–26	Cypriot First Division	30	0	6	1	—		—		36	1
Apollon Limassol	2026–27	Cypriot First Division	5	0	0	0	4	0	—		9	0
Apollon Limassol	Total		35	0	6	1	4	0	0	0	45	1
Career total			165	6	13	2	15	1	2	0	195	8

=== International ===
As of match played 15 November 2026

Appearances and goals by national team and year
National team	Year	Apps	Goals
Cyprus	2026	1	0
Total		1	0

== Honours ==
Aris Limassol

- Cypriot First Division: 2022–23
- Cypriot Super Cup: 2023
