= Floriss Djave =

Gabonese footballer

Personal information
- Date of birth: 29 July 2003 (age 23)
- Place of birth: Lambaréné, Gabon
- Height: 1.71 m (5 ft 7 in)
- Position: Winger

Senior career*
Years	Team	Apps	(Gls)
- Bouenguidi Sports
- Djoliba
2022–2023	Aris Limassol	20	(2)
2023	→ ENP (loan)	7	(1)
2023–2024	RFS	2	(0)
2024	Iberia 1999	13	(1)

International career^{‡}
	Gabon U23	3	(0)
- * Club domestic league appearances and goals as of 27 October 2024 ‡ National team caps and goals as of 1 July 2023

Floriss Djave (Note: also possibly Ndjave) (born either 15 November 1997 or 29 July 2003) is a Gabonese footballer who plays as a winger.

== Club career ==
Djave started his career with Bouenguidi Sports in his native Gabon, before a move to Mali to sign for Djoliba in April 2021, joining former coach Saturnin Ibéla in the process. In February 2022, he moved to Cyprus to join Aris Limassol.

Djave joined RFS on 15 July 2023.

== Personal life ==
=== Age fraud controversy ===
In late March, the Cameroonian Football Federation (known as FECAFOOT) lodged an appeal against Gabon, claiming that Djave was actually born in 1997, not 2003, making him ineligible to feature in under-23 competitions, and that his name was actually Floriss Ndjave. Djave had featured in Gabon under-23's 7–6 penalty shoot out win over Cameroon on 28 March 2023 to earn qualification to the 2023 U-23 Africa Cup of Nations. The Gabonese Football Federation (FEGAFOOT) responded, stating that Djave had been born on 29 July 2003 in Lambaréné.

Following his signing with Aris Limassol, the club stated in March 2022 that they were adamant that Djave's date of birth was indeed 29 July 2003. However, despite the support from Gabon and Aris, the Confederation of African Football (CAF) sided with Cameroon on the matter, disqualifying Gabon from the upcoming 2023 U-23 Africa Cup of Nations.

== Career statistics ==
=== Club ===
As of 18 May 2023

Appearances and goals by club, season and competition
Club	Season	League			Cup		Continental		Other		Total	
Club	Season	Division	Apps	Goals	Apps	Goals	Apps	Goals	Apps	Goals	Apps	Goals
Aris Limassol	2021–22	Cypriot First Division	8	1	0	0	0	0	0	0	8	1
Aris Limassol	2022–23	Cypriot First Division	12	1	0	0	0	0	0	0	12	1
Aris Limassol	Total		20	2	0	0	0	0	0	0	20	2
ENP (loan)	2022–23	Cypriot First Division	7	1	0	0	–		0	0	7	1
Career total			27	3	0	0	0	0	0	0	27	3

== Honours ==
- Virsliga: 2023
