= Kingsley Sarfo =

Ghanaian footballer (born 1995)

Personal information
- Full name: Kingsley Kofi Sarfo
- Date of birth: 13 February 1995 (age 31)
- Place of birth: Kumasi, Ghana
- Height: 1.66 m (5 ft 5 in)
- Position: Attacking midfielder

Team information
- Current team: Dinamo Samarqand
- Number: 44

Senior career*
Years	Team	Apps	(Gls)
2013	Rosengård		
2014	BW 90	15	(2)
2014–2017	IK Sirius	71	(9)
2017–2018	Malmö FF	8	(2)
2020–2022	Olympiakos Nicosia	37	(1)
2022	→ APOEL (loan)	12	(0)
2022–2025	APOEL	68	(5)
2026–	Dinamo Samarqand	9	(0)

International career^{‡}
2017	Ghana	1	(0)
- * Club domestic league appearances and goals as of 28 July 2026 ‡ National team caps and goals as of 8 June 2018

Kingsley Kofi Sarfo (born 13 February 1995) is a Ghanaian professional footballer who plays as an attacking midfielder for Uzbekistan Super League club Dinamo Samarqand. He earned one cap for the Ghana national team in 2017.

== Club career ==
=== Malmö FF ===
Following a promising start in Allsvenskan during 2017 Sarfo was subject to a bid from the title holders Malmö FF, where he agreed personal terms in spite of Sirius holding out for 15 million SEK or €1.5 million. Sarfo's agent stated that his client was only interested in making a move to Malmö because of him needing another year to acquire Swedish citizenship and therefore was not interested in moving abroad as well as wanting UEFA Champions League football. On 22 June 2017, Malmö FF confirmed the signing of Sarfo in a press conference. Sarfo made his debut for Malmö on the first day of the Swedish transfer window, 15 July, as his old club Sirius came to Swedbank Stadion. Sarfo scored a goal on his debut but could not help his team to a victory as the game ended 3–3. On 1 October 2017, Sarfo was suspended by the club until further notice after being declared a suspect in a police investigation. After a District Court had decided not to detain him, Sarfo continued to practice with Malmö FF until he was arrested again on 31 January 2018 under new charges. Malmö FF reacted by announcing his shut down. After his criminal conviction for multiple statutory rapes, Malmö FF terminated Sarfo's contract on 12 June 2018.

=== Olympiakos Nicosia ===
Sarfo returned to football after a two-year absence when the Director of Football of Olympiakos Nicosia gave him a second chance. He shone in his first year at the club leading it to a top 6 finish and cup final after 30 years. His contract was improved and extended until 2023 and was made club captain.

=== APOEL ===
In January 2022 Sarfo joined APOEL on loan, and on 26 June 2022 he joined the club on a permanent transfer, signing a three-year deal. In June 2025, Sarfo left the club following the expiration of his contract, becoming a free agent.

=== Dinamo Samarqand ===
In January 2026, Sarfo joined Uzbekistan Super League side Dinamo Samarqand.

== International career ==
He made his international debut for Ghana in 2017.

== Legal issues ==
=== Conviction of child rape ===
On 30 September 2017, Sarfo was requested to be arrested following accusations of one case of attempted rape, and two cases of statutory rape. As a result of the arrest, Sarfo was suspended from playing for Malmö FF, a suspension that was lifted on 11 January 2018 awaiting the legal process to be completed. On 31 January 2018, Sarfo once again was arrested by the Swedish police, suspected of five cases of statutory rape. On 8 June 2018, he was sentenced to two years and eight months in prison, along with a fine of 150,000 SEK and deportation after having served his jail sentence.

=== Driving without a valid license ===
During 2017 Sarfo drove his car on several occasions without holding a valid driver's license in Sweden. According to Swedish law this can result in up to six months in prison. Sarfo was not disciplined by the club in any way.

== Career statistics ==
=== Club ===
As of match played 29 September 2024

Appearances and goals by club, season and competition
Club	Season	League			National cup (Note: Includes Svenska Cupen, Cypriot Cup)		Continental		Other		Total	
Club	Season	Division	Apps	Goals	Apps	Goals	Apps	Goals	Apps	Goals	Apps	Goals
IK Sirius	2014	Superettan	2	0	3	0	–		–		5	0
IK Sirius	2015	Superettan	29	5	2	0	–		–		31	5
IK Sirius	2016	Superettan	29	1	4	1	–		–		33	2
IK Sirius	2017	Allsvenskan	11	3	4	2	–		–		15	5
IK Sirius	Total		71	9	13	3	–		–		84	12
Malmö FF	2017	Allsvenskan	8	2	1	1	0	0	–		9	3
Olympiakos Nicosia	2020–21	Cypriot First Division	22	1	5	1	–		–		27	2
Olympiakos Nicosia	2021–22	Cypriot First Division	15	0	0	0	–		–		15	0
Olympiakos Nicosia	Total		37	1	5	1	–		–		42	2
APOEL	2021–22	Cypriot First Division	12	0	2	0	0	0	–		14	0
APOEL	2022–23	Cypriot First Division	31	4	4	0	5 (Note: appearances in UEFA Europa Conference League)	0	–		40	4
APOEL	2023–24	Cypriot First Division	27	0	0	0	4	1	—		31	1
APOEL	2024–25	Cypriot First Division	3	1	0	0	4 (Note: Three appearances in UEFA Champions League, one appearance in UEFA Europa League)	0	1 (Note: Appearance in Cypriot Super Cup)	1	8	2
APOEL	Total		73	5	6	0	13	1	1	1	93	7
Career total			189	17	25	4	13	1	1	1	228	24

== Honours ==
IK Sirius

- Superettan: 2016

Malmö FF

- Allsvenskan: 2017

APOEL

- Cypriot First Division: 2023–24
- Cypriot Super Cup: 2024

Individual

- Superettan Player of the Year: 2016
- Superettan Midfielder of the Year: 2016
- Allsvenskan Player of the Month: April 2017
- Cyprus Sports Writers Best XI Team: 2022
- Pancyprian Footballers Association (PASP) Team of the Season: 2021–22
