= Delmiro =

Cape Verde footballer (born 1988)

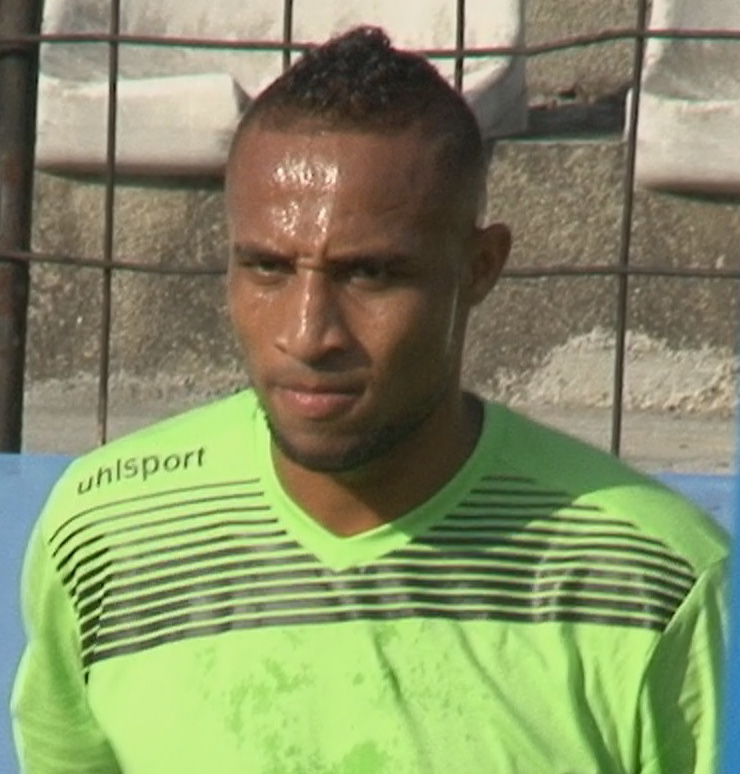

Personal information
- Full name: Delmiro Évora Nascimento
- Date of birth: 29 August 1988 (age 38)
- Place of birth: Mindelo, Cape Verde
- Height: 1.90 m (6 ft 3 in)
- Position: Defender

Team information
- Current team: APEA Akrotiri
- Number: 13

Senior career*
Years	Team	Apps	(Gls)
2008–2010	Batuque		
2010–2011	Madalena	1	(0)
2011–2012	Lusitano FCV		
2012–2013	Benfica e Castelo Branco	18	(2)
2013–2014	União da Madeira	16	(1)
2014	Progresso	6	(0)
2015–2016	Farense	31	(2)
2016–2017	Varzim	27	(1)
2017–2018	Arenas Getxo	8	(0)
2018–2019	Farense	13	(2)
2019–2023	Aris Limassol	85	(3)
2023–2024	AEZ Zakakiou	16	(1)
2024	Ypsonas Krasava	10	(0)
2024–2025	Karmiotissa	20	(2)
2025–	APEA Akrotiri	26	(1)

International career
2018	Cape Verde	1	(0)
- * Club domestic league appearances and goals as of 3 May 2026

Delmiro Évora Nascimento (born 29 August 1988), known as Delmiro, is a Cape Verdean professional footballer who plays as a defender for Cypriot club APEA Akrotiri

== Club career ==
Delmiro made his professional debut in the Segunda Liga for União da Madeira on 11 August 2013 in a game against Desportivo das Aves.

On 9 August 2019, Delmiro joined Aris Limassol FC in Cyprus.

== International career ==
Delmiro earned his only international cap in a 0–0 (4–3) penalty shootout win over Andorra on 3 June 2018.

== Personal life ==
He is the younger brother of fellow Cape Verde international Vozinha.
