= Andreas Karamanolis =

Cypriot footballer (born 2001)

Personal information
- Date of birth: 2 September 2001 (age 25)
- Place of birth: Larnaca, Cyprus
- Height: 1.83 m (6 ft 0 in)
- Position: Centre-back

Team information
- Current team: Anorthosis
- Number: 47

Youth career
- —2018: Ayia Napa

Senior career*
| Years | Team | Apps | (Gls) |
| 2018–2021 | Ayia Napa | 0 | (0) |
| 2021–2024 | Doxa Katokopias | 56 | (2) |
| 2023–2024 | → APOEL (loan) | 4 | (0) |
| 2024– | Panserraikos | 4 | (0) |
| 2025–2026 | → Anorthosis (loan) | 16 | (1) |
| 2026– | Anorthosis | 0 | (0) |

International career^{‡}
| 2021–2022 | Cyprus U21 | 5 | (0) |
- * Club domestic league appearances and goals as of 14 June 2026 ‡ National team caps and goals as of 15 July 2022 (UTC)

Andreas Karamanolis (Greek: Ανδρέας Καραμανώλης, born 2 September 2001) is a Cypriot professional footballer who plays as a centre-back for Anorthosis.

== Club career ==
=== Early career ===
Born in Larnaca, started his career in the youth academy of Cypriot club Ayia Napa.

=== Doxa Katokopias ===
On 17 August 2021, it was officially announced that Karamanolis signed for Doxa.

He made his professional debut in the Cypriot First Division for Doxa on 12 September 2021 in a game against Anorthosis Famagusta.

== Career statistics ==
As of match played 24 November 2025

Appearances and goals by club, season and competition
| Club | Season | League | | | National Cup | | Europe | | Other | | Total | |
| Club | Season | Division | Apps | Goals | Apps | Goals | Apps | Goals | Apps | Goals | Apps | Goals |
|---|---|---|---|---|---|---|---|---|---|---|---|---|
| Doxa | 2021–22 | Cypriot First Division | 25 | 0 | 1 | 0 | — | | — | | 26 | 0 |
| Doxa | 2022–23 | Cypriot First Division | 31 | 2 | 3 | 0 | — | | — | | 34 | 2 |
| Doxa | Subtotal | | 56 | 2 | 4 | 0 | — | | — | | 60 | 2 |
| APOEL (loan) | 2023–24 | Cypriot First Division | 4 | 0 | 1 | 1 | — | | — | | 5 | 1 |
| Panserraikos | 2024–25 | Superleague Greece | 4 | 0 | 1 | 0 | — | | — | | 5 | 0 |
| Anorthosis (loan) | 2025–26 | Cypriot First Division | 16 | 1 | 1 | 0 | — | | — | | 17 | 1 |
| Career total | | | 80 | 3 | 7 | 1 | 0 | 0 | 0 | 0 | 87 | 4 |

== Honours ==
APOEL

- Cypriot First Division: 2023–24
