= Konstantinos Karagiannis =

Cypriot footballer (born 2000)

Personal information
- Date of birth: 2 April 2000 (age 26)
- Place of birth: Nicosia, Cyprus
- Height: 1.76 m (5 ft 9 in)
- Position: Left-back

Team information
- Current team: PAEEK
- Number: 11

Youth career
- APOEL

Senior career*
Years	Team	Apps	(Gls)
2019–2020	APOEL	0	(0)
2019–2020	→ Alki Oroklini (loan)		
2020–2022	Olympiakos Nicosia	1	(0)
2020–2021	→ PAEEK (loan)		
2022–2023	Akritas Chlorakas	31	(0)
2023–2024	Volos	2	(0)
2024–2025	Olympiakos Nicosia	24	(2)
2025–	PAEEK	29	(2)

International career^{‡}
2016–2017	Cyprus U17	11	(1)
2018–2019	Cyprus U19	7	(0)
- * Club domestic league appearances and goals as of 3 May 2026 ‡ National team caps and goals as of 10 January 2019

Konstantinos Karagiannis (Greek: Κωνσταντίνος Καραγιάννης; born 2 April 2000) is a Cypriot professional footballer who plays as a left-back for PAEEK.
