= Alphamega Stadium =

Cypriot stadium

- Limassol Stadium
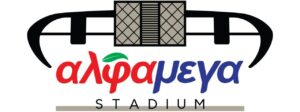

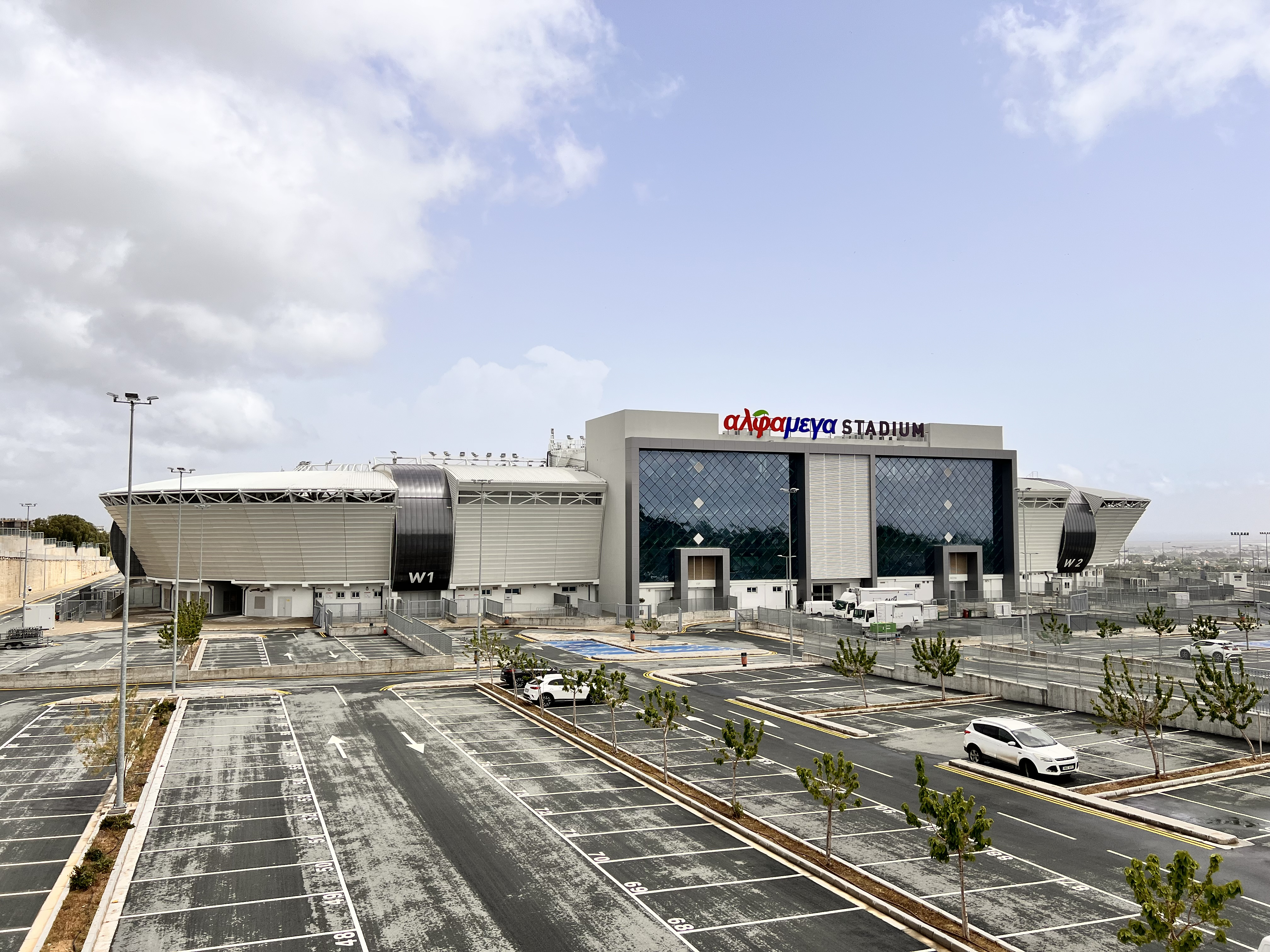
- Alphamega Stadium's front UEFA
- Interactive map of Alphamega Stadium
- Full name: Alphamega Stadium
- Location: Kolossi, Limassol District, Cyprus
- Coordinates: 34°41′36″N 32°56′21″E
- Owner: Cyprus Sports Organisation (CSO)
- Operator: A.A.A. Limassol Stadium Ltd
- Capacity: 10,830
- Executive suites: 44
- Surface: Natural Grass
- Record attendance: 9,667 (Cyprus vs Spain, 16 November 2023)
- Field size: 105 m × 67 m (344 ft × 220 ft)
- Parking: 1,024

Construction
- Groundbreaking: 28 January 2019
- Built: January 2019 – November 2022
- Opened: 25 November 2022
- Cost: €45,220,000
- Architect: Petros Kontaridis
- General contractor: Cyfield – Neophytou J.V.

Tenants
- Apollon Limassol (2022–present); AEL Limassol (2022–present); Aris Limassol (2022–present); Cyprus national football team (2023, 2025); UEFA U-17 Championship (2024); Pafos (European Matches) (2024–present)

Website
- thealphamegastadium.com

The Alphamega Stadium, also known as Limassol Stadium for UEFA competitions, is a football stadium in Kolossi, Limassol District, Cyprus, and the home ground of the 3 biggest clubs of Limassol Apollon, AEL and Aris. With an all-seater capacity of 10,830, it is the second largest football-only stadium and the fifth largest football stadium overall in Cyprus.

== Name ==
The official name of the stadium is Alphamega Stadium. This name resulted from a sponsorship collaboration between the stadium management company and C.A. Papaellinas Emporiki Ltd, the company which owns and manages Alphamega Hypermarkets, for the use of the supermarket's name as the stadium's trade name until the end of the 2027–28 domestic league season.

== History ==
Initially, the stadium would be built by AEL and Aris on the same site which had been given to the two teams in previous years. The two teams chose the architect Petros Kontaridis, who prepared the plans for the stadium. After the financial crisis of 2013, Apollon agreed to build a stadium together with the other two teams and the plans were modified.

Due to the increased costs that the teams could not bear but also due to the fact that the existing Tsirio Stadium had several problems and the city needed a new stadium, the CSO decided to finance the project. However, as the project would not be state-owned but would belong to other users and would exceed €15 million in funding, this funding had to be approved by the Directorate-General for Competition of the European Commission.

The Directorate-General for Competition of the European Commission considered this funding illegal because the stadium would belong to the teams, thus resulting in preferential treatment by the state for these teams at the expense of other teams. For this reason, the land was transferred to the CSO, which took over the financing of the project and the ownership of the stadium. The CSO granted the management of the stadium to the three teams.

The signatures of the construction contracts between the CSO and the Cyfield – Neophytou J.V. joint venture, which undertook to build the stadium, took place on 4 January 2019. The construction of the stadium began on 28 January 2019.

The official inauguration of the Alphamega Stadium took place on 25 November 2022. The first match was played on 15 December 2022 between Apollon and Doxa Katokopias for the 15th matchday of the 2022–23 Cypriot First Division. Apollon won the match with 1–0 score. The first goal which was achieved in the Alphamega Stadium was scored by Khaled Adénon as an own goal.
