= Tsirio Stadium =

All-seater multi-purpose stadium in Limassol, Cyprus

- Τσίρειο Στάδιο
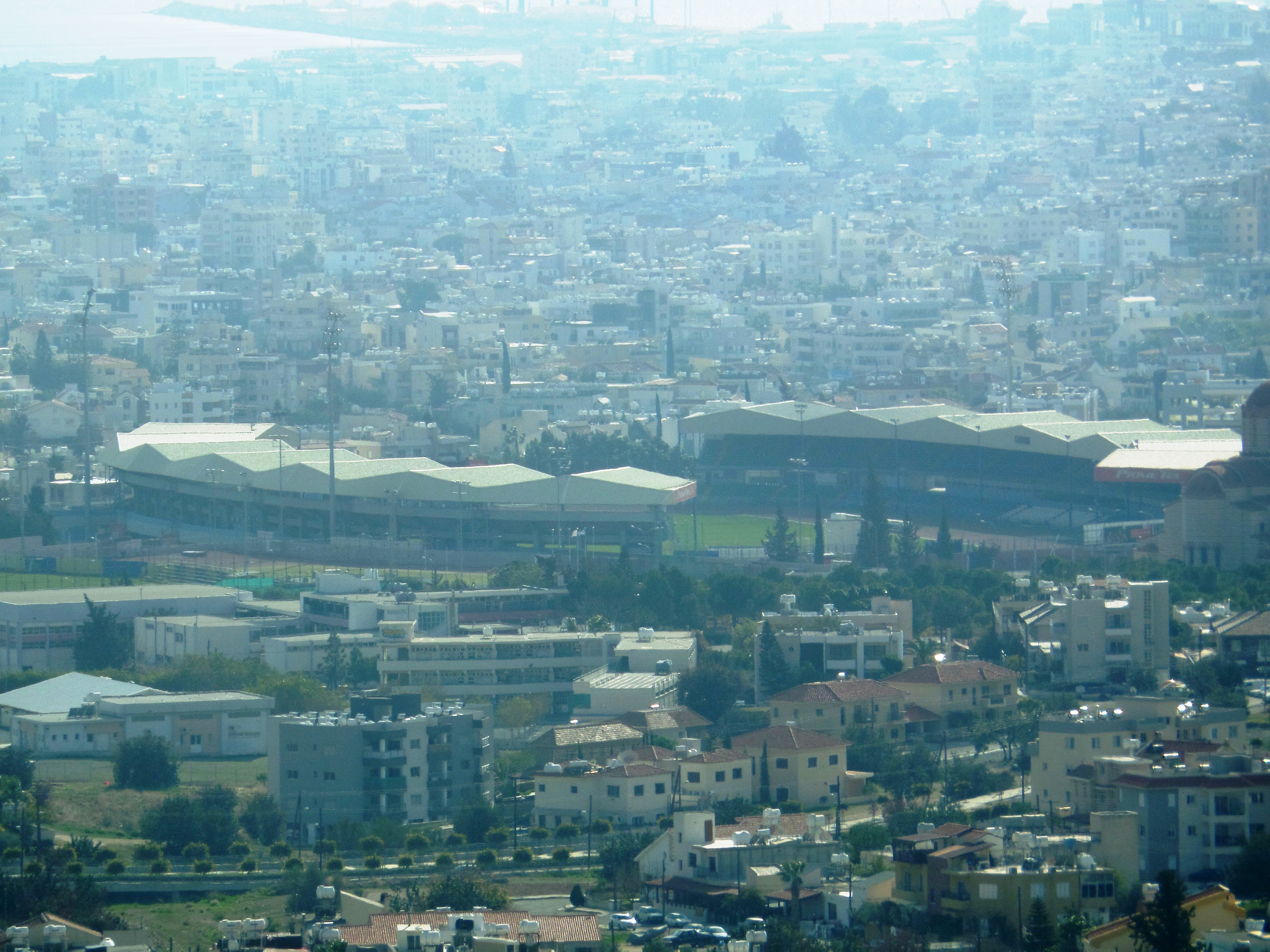
- Interactive map of Tsirio Stadium
- Full name: Tsirio Athletic Centre
- Location: Limassol, Cyprus
- Coordinates: 34°42′3″N 33°1′23″E
- Owner: Cyprus Sport Organisation - CSO (Greek: Κυπριακός Οργανισμός Αθλητισμού)
- Operator: G.S.O.
- Capacity: 13,331
- Surface: Natural Grass
- Field size: 105 m × 67 m (344 ft × 220 ft)

Construction
- Built: 1973–1975
- Opened: 1975
- Renovated: 1985

Tenants
- Karmiotissa Polemidion (2022–2023); AEL Limassol (1975–2022); Apollon Limassol (1975–2022); Aris Limassol (1975–2022); APEP Pitsilias (2008–2010)

The Tsirio Stadium (Greek: Τσίρειο Στάδιο) is an all-seater multi-purpose stadium in Limassol, Cyprus.

The stadium holds 13,331 people and is mostly used for football matches. It was the home ground of the three biggest clubs in Limassol, which have now moved to the Alphamega Stadium.

The football pitch is surrounded by an athletics track and serves as the home ground of the Limassol GSO (Gymnastikos Syllogos Olympia) Athletics Club.

== History ==
The stadium was built in 1975 with the help of Petros I. Tsiros, a famous businessman and philanthropist of the city, to replace the aging GSO Stadium. For his contributions to the construction of the stadium, Tsiros became its namesake.

In the past, especially in the 1990s, it was used as the home ground for the Cyprus national football team.

Some matches of the 1992 UEFA European Under-16 Football Championship, which was hosted in Cyprus, were played in this stadium including the two semi-final matches held on 14 May 1992. In the first match, Spain beat Portugal 3–1 and in the other match, Germany beat Italy 6–5 on penalties after a 0–0 draw. Through these matches, Spain and Germany advanced to the final. The stadium also hosted some Cyprus Super Cup and Cypriot Cup finals.

The construction of the Alphamega Stadium replaced Tsirio Stadium as the city's main football stadium.

== Gallery ==
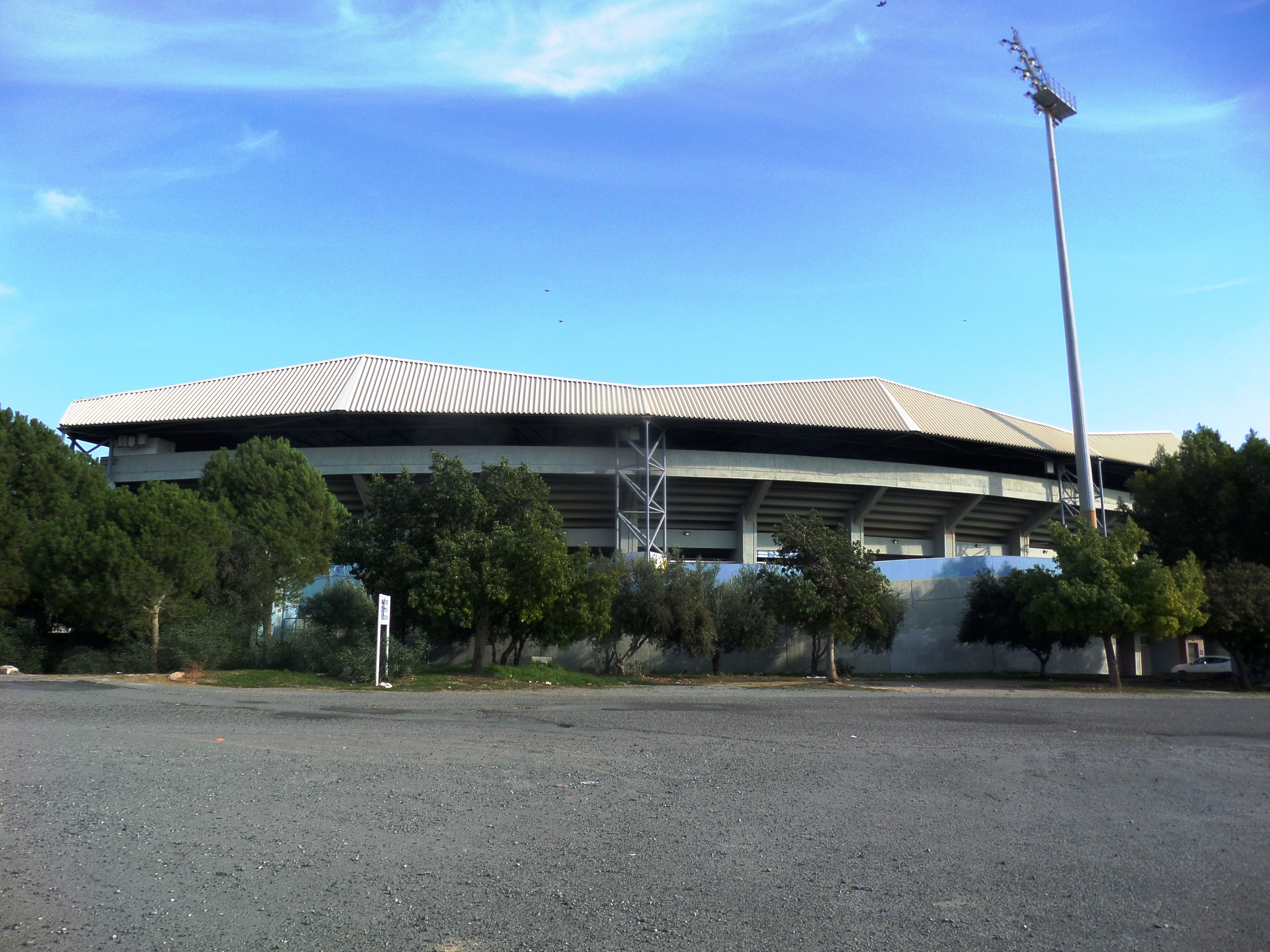

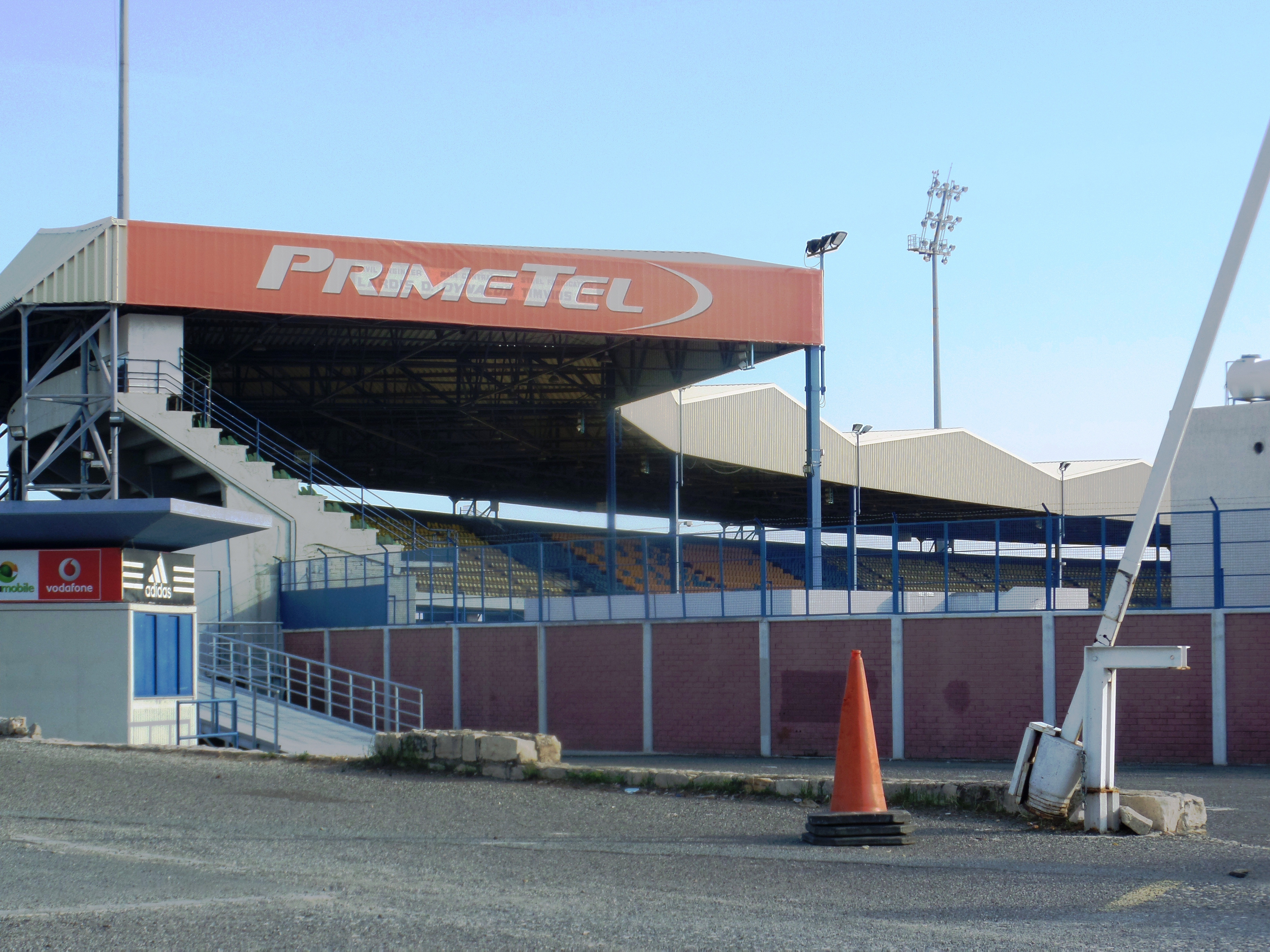

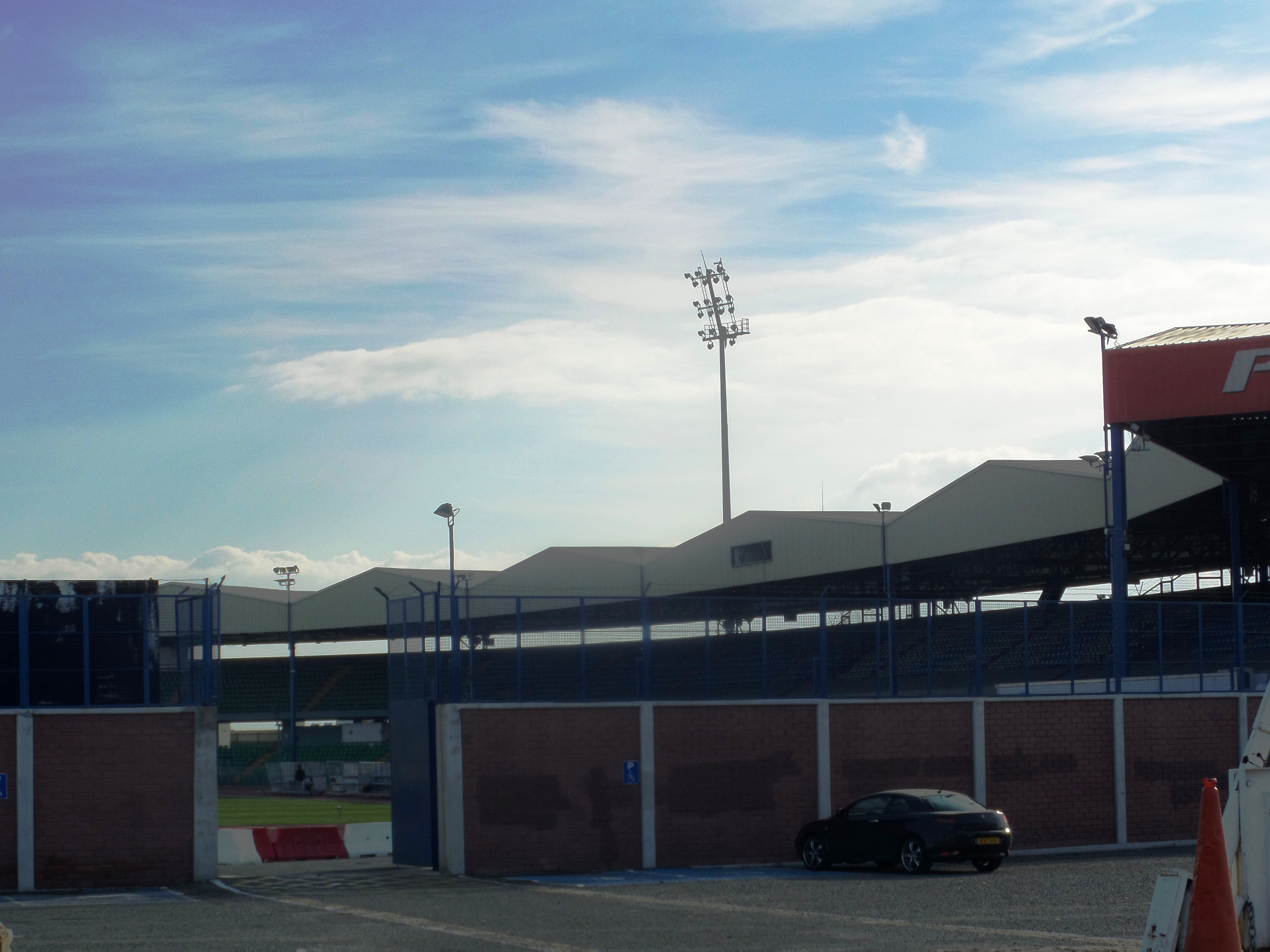

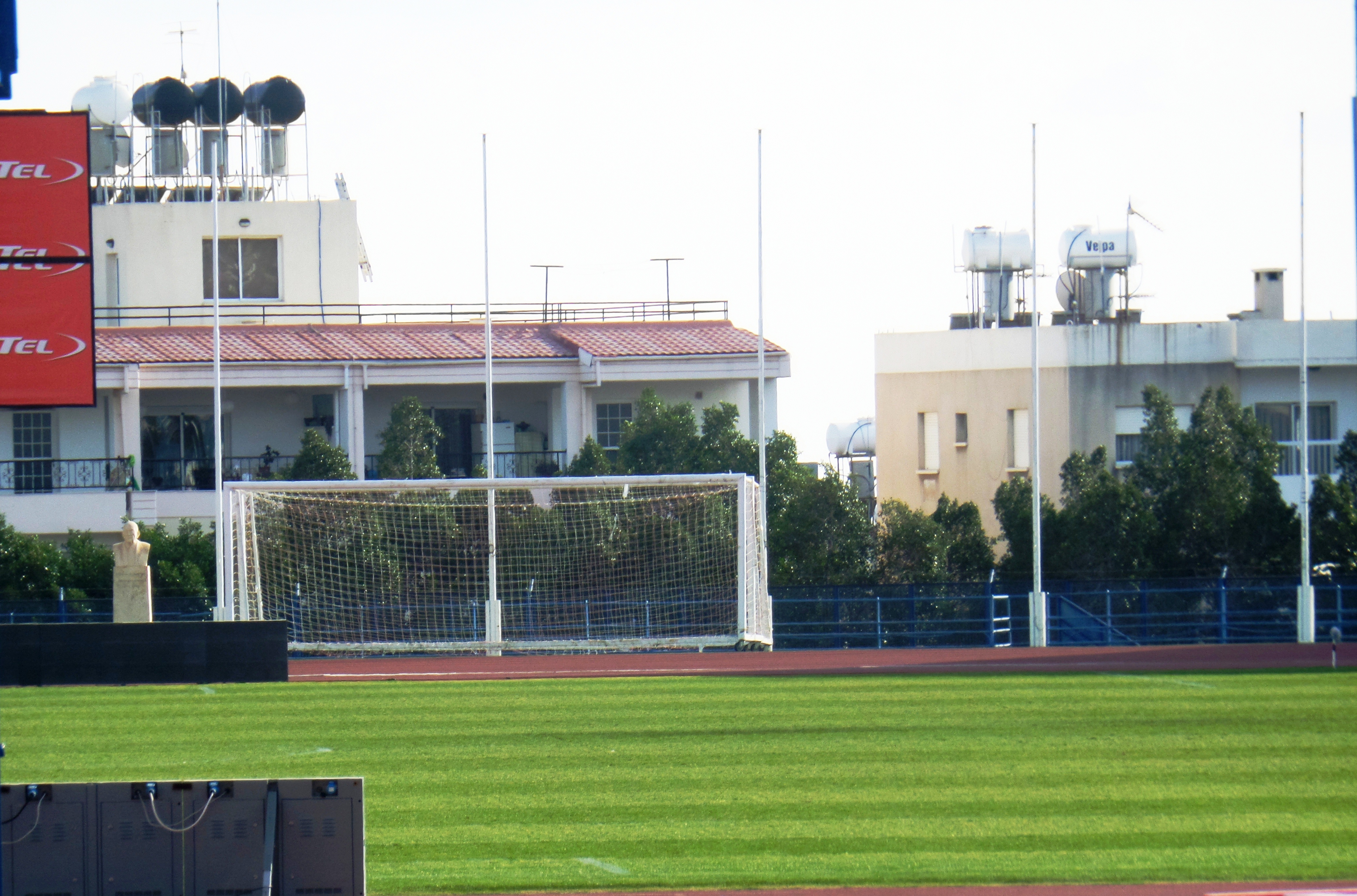

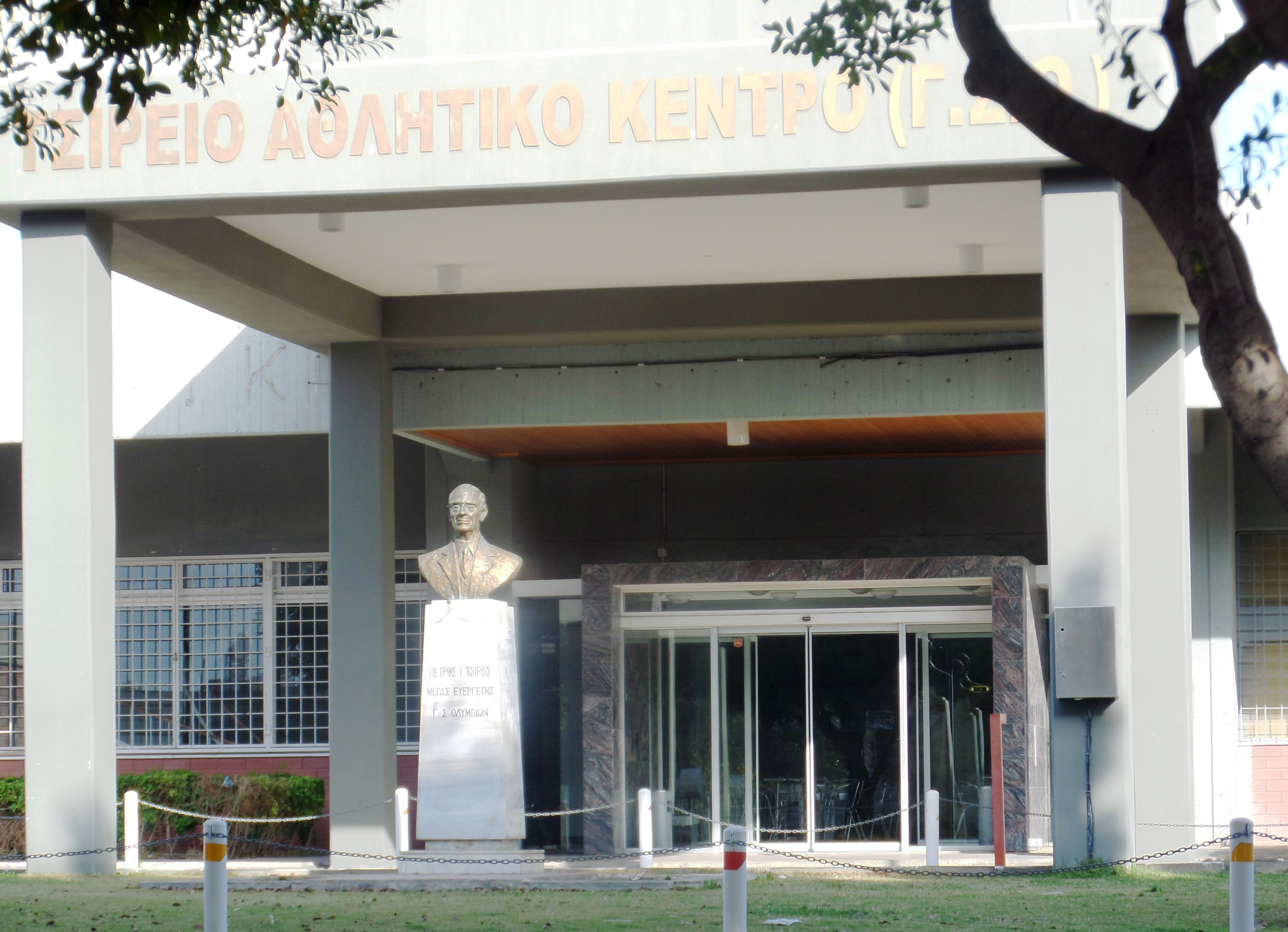

== See also ==
- List of football stadiums in Cyprus
