= GSP Stadium =

Football stadium in Strovolos, Cyprus

Στάδιο ΓΣΠ / GSP Stadium
- GSP Stadium
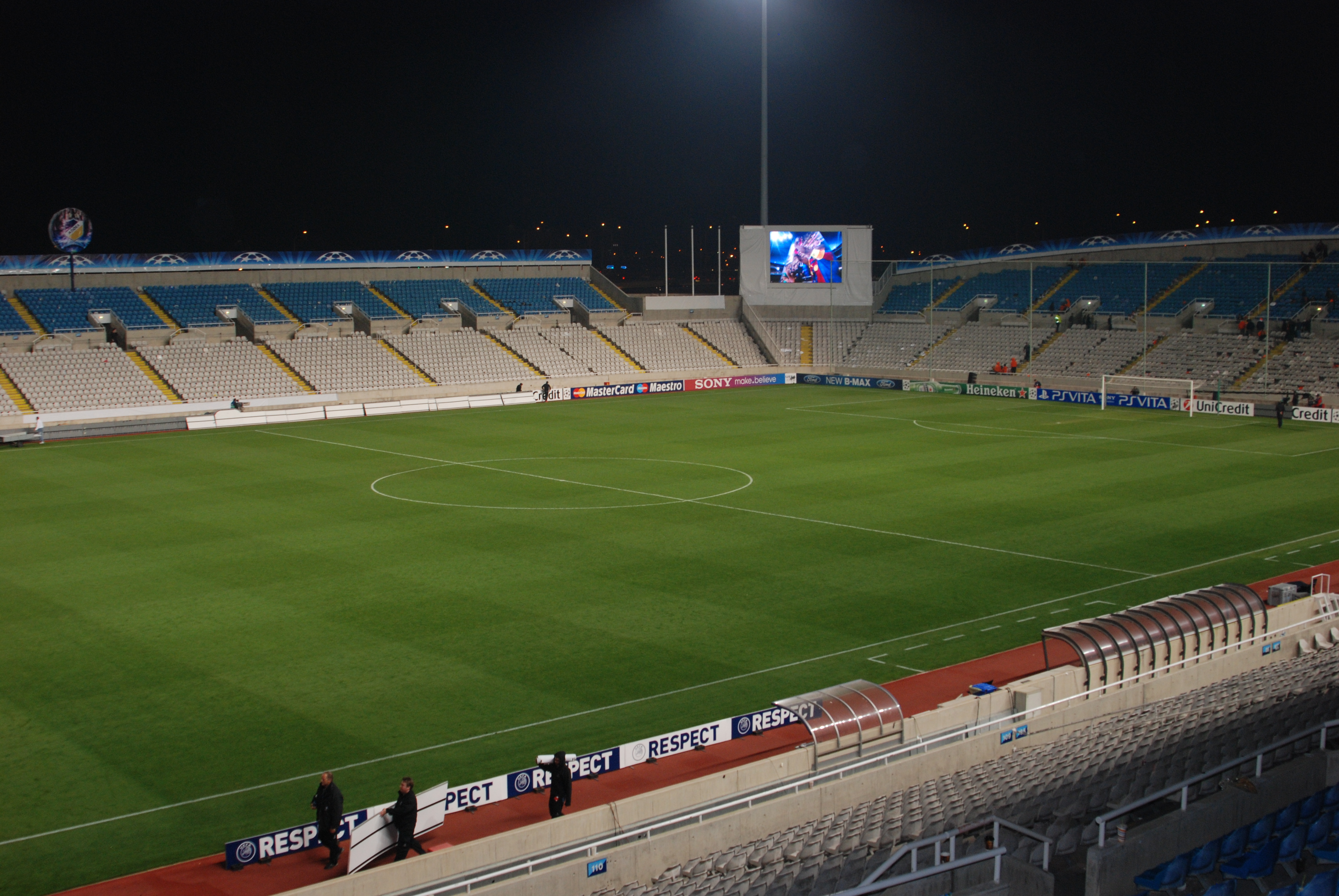
- Interior of GSP Stadium; UEFA
- Interactive map of Στάδιο ΓΣΠ / GSP Stadium
- Full name: Στάδιο Γυμναστικού Συλλόγου «Τα Παγκύπρια»/Gymnastic Club "The Pancyprians" Stadium
- Location: Strovolos, Nicosia District, Cyprus
- Coordinates: 35°6′52″N 33°21′46″E
- Owner: Pancyprian Gymnastic Association
- Operator: GSP
- Capacity: 22,829
- Executive suites: 31
- Surface: Natural Grass
- Record attendance: 23,043; APOEL Nicosia vs Omonia Nicosia (7 December 2002 – Cypriot First Division)
- Field size: 105 m × 68 m (344 ft × 223 ft)

Construction
- Groundbreaking: 1995
- Built: 1995–1998
- Opened: 6 October 1999; 27 years ago
- Architect: TDA Architects
- Project manager: KAL Engineering
- Structural engineer: KAL Engineering Ltd
- General contractor: Group APC Plc

Tenants
- AC Omonoia (1999–present); APOEL FC (1999–present); Olympiakos Nicosia (1999–2008, 2009–2013, 2021–2022, 2025-); Cyprus national football team (2000–2021, 2025-present)

Website
- www.gsp.org.cy

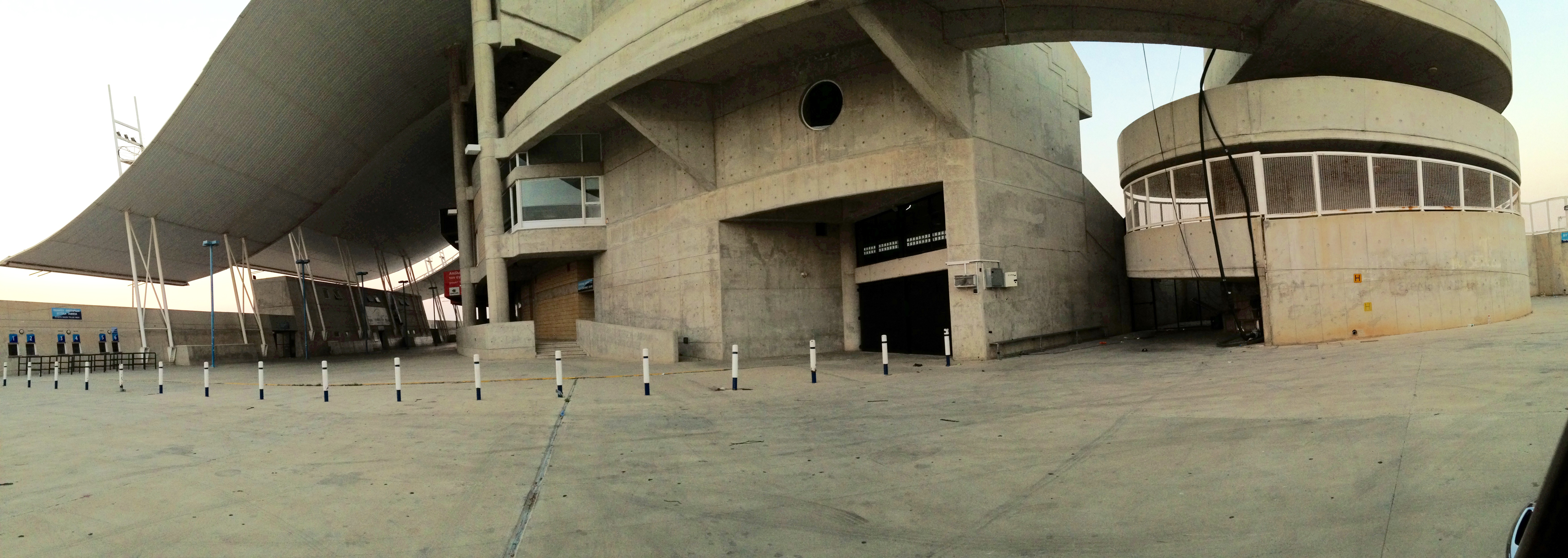
GSP modern exterior design

The GSP Stadium (Greek: Στάδιο ΓΣΠ) is a football stadium in Strovolos, Nicosia District, Cyprus. Although small by international standards, it is the largest stadium in Cyprus, with a capacity of 22,859 and was opened in 1999. It serves as the home stadium for the 3 biggest football clubs of Nicosia Omonia, Olympiakos & APOEL. It is also the home stadium of the Cyprus national football team. A stadium under the same name, the old GSP Stadium, existed from 1902 until 1999 in the centre of Nicosia and had a capacity of 12,000.

== History ==
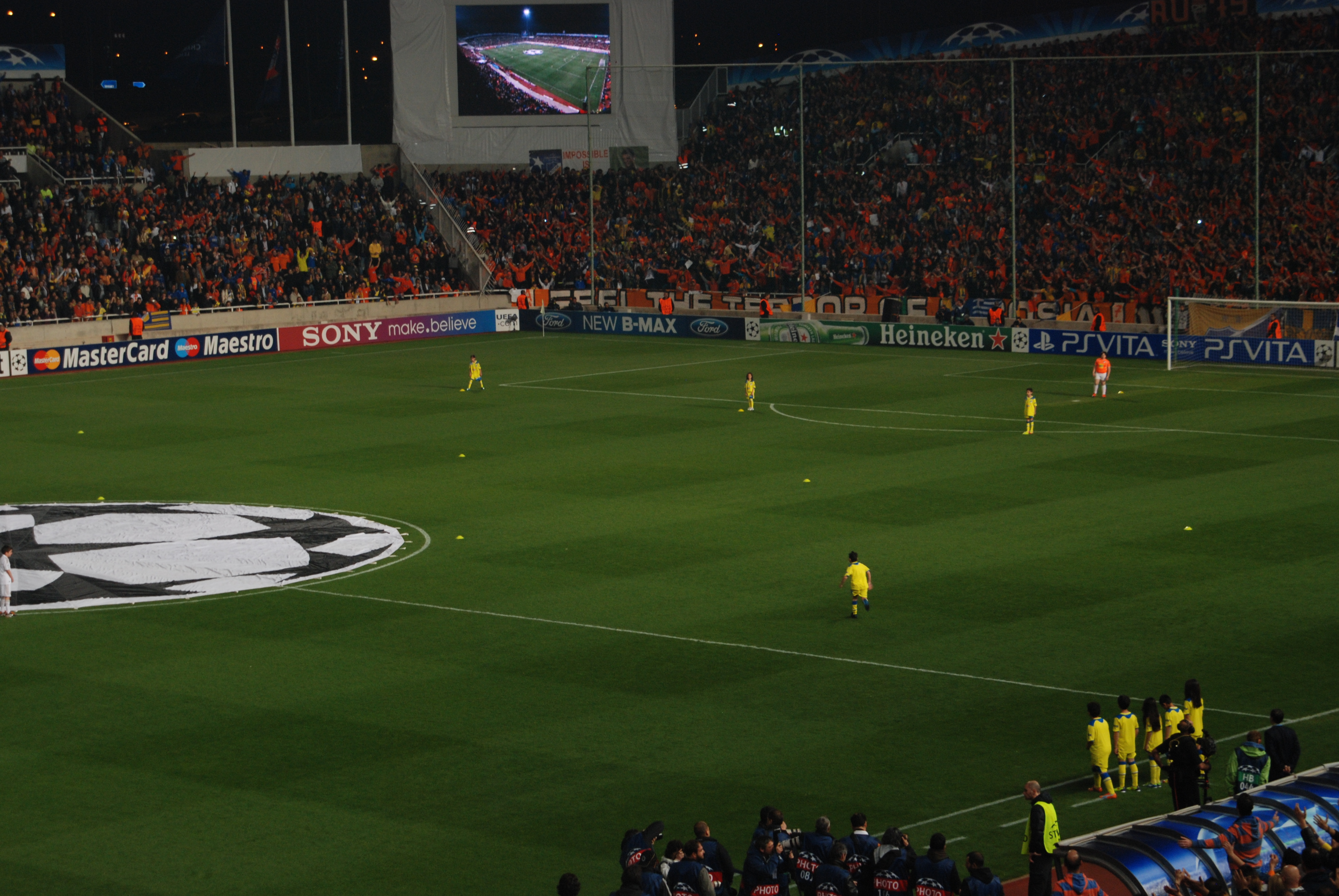
UEFA Champions League (APOEL vs Real Madrid) in GSP

Designed by Theo. David Architects, the new GSP Stadium opened for use on 6 October 1999. The complex has three arenas: a football stadium, an athletics stadium and an auxiliary football pitch intended for training. The stadium is owned by the Pancyprian Gymnastic Association. With an official seating capacity of 22,859, the GSP Stadium is the largest football venue in Cyprus. It is located at the entrance to Nicosia (as approached from the A1 highway) and was inaugurated in 1999 by the then-President Glafcos Clerides and Archbishop Chrysostomos I. The first game was, a friendly match between APOEL and Omonia, which ended in a 3–3 draw on 6 October 1999.

Since then, the stadium is not only the home of Nicosian teams but usually of Cyprus national football team. During the World Cup 2006 qualifying round it was used as home for all matches of Cyprus. The stadium is the only one in Cyprus which satisfies UEFA Criteria. For this reason since 2004 it is used as home for all the teams of Cyprus in European Cups. Annually, the stadium hosts the Cypriot Super Cup. Also until 2005, it was hosting annually the Cypriot Cup final.

In 2002, the stadium was home for Israeli clubs for the UEFA Cup and UEFA Champions League matches. It hosted the UEFA Cup quarter final (as home for Hapoel Tel Aviv) between Hapoel Tel Aviv and A.C. Milan. It was also used by Maccabi Haifa for home stadium for the 2002–03 UEFA Champions League group stage matches and for the UEFA Cup matches. Some matches were attractive for Cypriots like the matches Maccabi Haifa-Olympiacos CFP and Maccabi Haifa-Manchester United, since those two Maccabi's rivals are very popular in Cyprus.

It's the only stadium in Cyprus build only for track & field games. In addition with the hotel, it provides a full training centre solution for athletes all over the world. During the Athens 2004 Olympic Games, many athletes from different countries used the stadium for training.

The GSP Stadium hosted all home matches of Anorthosis Famagusta's 2008–09 UEFA Champions League group stage campaign and all APOEL's 2009–10 UEFA Champions League group stage home matches. Two years later, it hosted all APOEL's home matches in the club's surprising run to the quarter-finals of the 2011–12 UEFA Champions League. Also, it hosted again all APOEL's home matches in their third participation in the 2014–15 UEFA Champions League group stages. All matches were sold out by APOEL's fans.

The GSP Stadium also hosted AEK Larnaca's 2011–12 UEFA Europa League group stage matches, AEL Limassol's 2012–13 UEFA Europa League group stage matches, APOEL's and Apollon Limassol's 2013–14 UEFA Europa League group stage matches, Apollon's 2014–15 UEFA Europa League group stage matches and APOEL's 2015–16 group stage matches. The GSP Stadium also hosted all APOEL's home matches in the club's impressive run to the last 16 of the 2016–17 UEFA Europa League.

Due to Maidan Revolution in Kyiv and after UEFA's decision, the GSP Stadium hosted the 2013–14 UEFA Europa League round of 32 match between Dynamo Kyiv and Valencia CF on 20 February 2014, which ended in 0–2 Valencia win.

In the 2003–04 domestic league season, tenants Omonia drew the highest average home attendance (11,003).

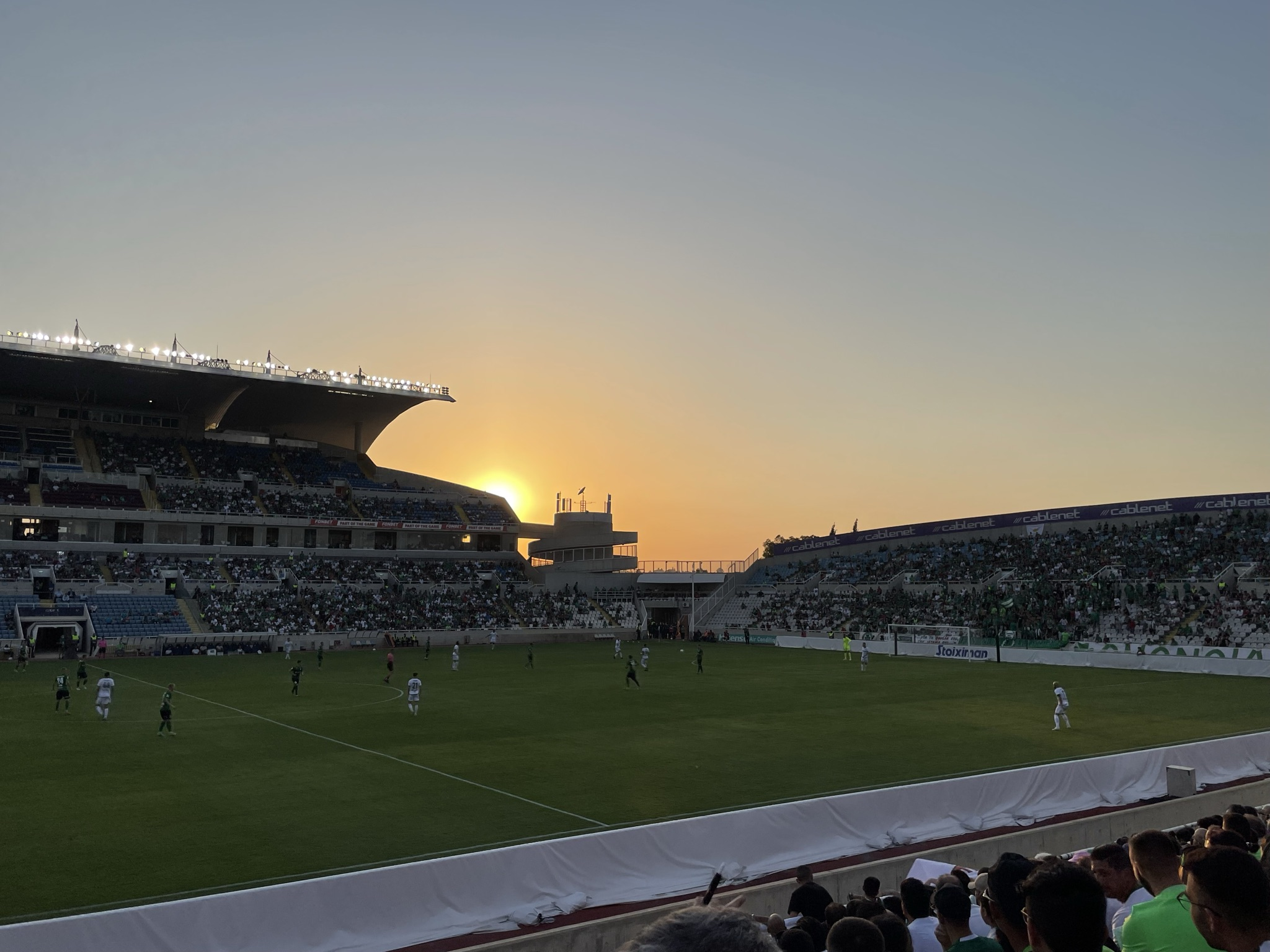
The GSP Stadium in 2021

== Average attendances ==
The all-time attendance record for the football stadium is 23,043 tickets in the match between APOEL and Omonia for the 2002–03 Cypriot First Division. The match was held on 7 December 2002 and ended in a goalless draw.

The record of the highest attendance for a European Competition game is 22,701 tickets in the match between APOEL and Olympique Lyonnais for the 2011–12 UEFA Champions League last-16. The match was held on 7 March 2012 and ended with a 1–0 win for APOEL after extra time and 4–3 win on penalties.

Season	APOEL	Olympiakos	Omonia
2015–16	7,362	Makario Stadium	6,002
2014–15	6,890	Makario Stadium	7,414
2013–14	7,108	Makario Stadium	6,332
2012–13	9,582	983	7,807
2011–12	8,248	1,506	8,176
2010–11	9,418	1,587	7,799
2009–10	7,582	461 (2nd Div.)	9,070
2008–09	7,670	Makario Stadium	9,295
2007–08	7,239	1,692	5,967
2006–07	8,932	1,563	6,678
2005–06	7,460	1,703	8,557
2004–05	7,714	1,981	6,535
2003–04	8,387	1,911	11,003
2002–03	8,205	2,761	10,877
2001–02	7,604	1,959	7,825
2000–01	3,893	2,201	8,620
1999–00	3,718	1,505	4,693

Source: European Football Statistics

== Attributes ==
Stand	Capacity	Entrance Gates
West Stand	7,818	6
East Stand	4,939	4
North Stand	4,749	4
South Stand	4,953	4
VIP Boxes	400	1
Total	22,859	19

== The club ==
The Gymnastic Association Pancypria was founded in 1894 with the initiative of the lawyer Theofanis Theodotou and the doctors Antonios Theodotou and Aristofanis Fenievs.

In 1896, the G.S. Pancypria participated in the A' Pancyprian Games which took place in the G.S. Olympia Stadium in Limassol. Since then it has participated in all pancyprian games because the Pancyprian Games became a significant national feast for Cyprus, during which the stadium, where the games were taking place, was decorated with Greek flags and the national desires were proclaimed .

== See also ==
- List of football stadiums in Cyprus
- Lists of stadiums
