= 2022–23 Cypriot First Division =

Cypriot First Division season

Cyta Championship
- Season: 2022–23
- Dates: 26 August 2022 – 29 May 2023
- Champions: Aris Limassol; 1st title
- Relegated: Akritas Chlorakas; Olympiakos Nicosia; Enosis Neon Paralimni
- UEFA Champions League: Aris Limassol
- UEFA Europa Conference League: Omonia; AEK Larnaca; APOEL
- Matches: 268
- Goals: 636 (2.37 per match)
- Top goalscorer: Jairo; Ioannis Pittas (both 18 goals)
- Biggest home win: Aris Limassol 5–0 Olympiakos Nicosia (2 September 2022); Enosis Neon Paralimni 5–0 Akritas Chlorakas (26 February 2023)
- Biggest away win: Akritas Chlorakas 0–4 Pafos (10 September 2022)
- Highest scoring: Pafos 5–2 Akritas Chlorakas (23 December 2022); AEK Larnaca 4–3 Aris Limassol (15 January 2023); Apollon Limassol 3–4 Karmiotissa (9 February 2023)
- Longest winning run: 9 matches APOEL; AEK Larnaca
- Longest unbeaten run: 16 matches Aris Limassol
- Longest winless run: 12 matches Olympiakos Nicosia
- Longest losing run: 7 matches Akritas Chlorakas
- Highest attendance: 14,052; APOEL 4–0 Omonia; 27 November 2022
- Total attendance: 551,808
- All statistics correct as of 29 May 2023.

The 2022–23 Cypriot First Division was the 84th season of the Cypriot top-level football league.

== Competition system ==
14 teams participated in the 2022–23 First Division.

It was conducted in two phases. In the first phase, all teams played each other twice, one at home and one away. After the completion of the 26 matches (A phase) the teams participated in 2 groups (depending on their position) and played ranking matches (B phase). The results, points and goals of the A' phase were transferred to the matches. The teams in places 1–6 competed for the championship and places leading to the European championships. The teams faced each other twice, one at home and one away. The team with the most points was declared the champion. The champion team secured their place in the 2023–24 UEFA Champions League. In addition, the teams finishing in second and third place secured their participation in the 2023–24 UEFA Europa Conference League.

The teams in positions 7–14 faced each other twice, one at home and one away. The bottom three teams were relegated to the Second Division.

== Changes compared to the previous season ==
In relation to the 2021–22 season, the teams promoted from the Second Division will participate in the 2022–23 First Division are Karmiotissa, New Salamina, Akritas Chlorakas and Enosis Neon Paralimni. The teams that will not take a part in the season are PAEEK and Ethnikos Achna who had been relegated to the Second Division.

== Stadiums and locations ==
Locations of the 2022–23 Cypriot First Division teams.

Note: Table lists clubs in alphabetical order.

Team	Location	Stadium	Capacity
AEK Larnaca	Larnaca	AEK Arena	7,400
AEL Limassol	Limassol	Alphamega Stadium	10,700
Akritas Chlorakas	Chloraka, Paphos	Stelios Kyriakides Stadium	9,394
Anorthosis Famagusta	Famagusta	Antonis Papadopoulos Stadium	10,230
APOEL	Nicosia	GSP Stadium	22,859
Apollon Limassol	Limassol	Alphamega Stadium	10,700
Aris Limassol	Limassol	Alphamega Stadium	10,700
Doxa Katokopias	Katokopia, Nicosia	Katokopia Stadium	3,500
Enosis Neon Paralimni	Paralimni, Famagusta	Tasos Markou Stadium	5,800
Karmiotissa	Pano Polemidia, Limassol	Tsirio Stadium	13,331
Nea Salamis Famagusta	Famagusta	Ammochostos Stadium	5,500
Olympiakos Nicosia	Nicosia	Makario Stadium	16,000
Omonia	Nicosia	GSP Stadium	22,859
Pafos FC	Paphos	Stelios Kyriakides Stadium	9,394

== Regular season ==
=== League table ===
Pos	Team	Pld	W	D	L	GF	GA	GD	Pts	Qualification or relegation
1	APOEL	26	18	5	3	40	13	+27	59	Qualification for the Championship round
2	AEK Larnaca	26	18	3	5	46	21	+25	57	Qualification for the Championship round
3	Aris Limassol	26	15	8	3	46	20	+26	53	Qualification for the Championship round
4	Pafos	26	14	8	4	48	20	+28	50	Qualification for the Championship round
5	Apollon Limassol	25	13	5	7	34	27	+7	44	Qualification for the Championship round
6	Omonia	26	13	2	11	37	28	+9	41	Qualification for the Championship round
7	Nea Salamis Famagusta	26	12	2	12	27	34	−7	38	Qualification for the Relegation round
8	AEL Limassol	25	10	5	10	21	20	+1	35	Qualification for the Relegation round
9	Anorthosis Famagusta	26	9	6	11	22	30	−8	33	Qualification for the Relegation round
10	Karmiotissa	26	7	6	13	25	40	−15	27	Qualification for the Relegation round
11	Enosis Neon Paralimni	26	6	3	17	22	38	−16	21	Qualification for the Relegation round
12	Doxa Katokopias	26	5	6	15	18	36	−18	21	Qualification for the Relegation round
13	Olympiakos Nicosia	26	2	10	14	16	40	−24	16	Qualification for the Relegation round
14	Akritas Chlorakas	26	3	3	20	15	50	−35	12	Qualification for the Relegation round

Source: Cyprus Football Association
Rules for classification: 1) Points; 2) Head-to-head points; 3) Head-to-head goal difference; 4) Head-to-head goals scored; 5) Head-to-head away goals scored (only if two teams); 6) Goal difference; 7) Goals scored; 8) Play-off (only if deciding championship round, relegation round or relegation).

=== Results ===
Home \ Away	AEK	AEL	AKR	ANO	APOE	APOL	ARI	DOX	ENP	KAR	NSF	OLY	OMO	PAF
AEK Larnaca	—	1–0	1–1	4–0	2–1	1–0	4–3	0–0	3–1	4–0	1–0	4–2	2–1	1–0
AEL Limassol	2–1	—	2–1	0–1	1–0	0–2	0–0	1–2	0–1	2–0	1–0	2–0	1–0	1–3
Akritas Chlorakas	1–2	0–3	—	1–0	1–2	1–3	0–3	1–2	2–1	0–2	1–2	0–1	1–0	0–4
Anorthosis Famagusta	0–0	1–1	1–1	—	0–2	0–1	0–2	3–0	1–0	0–3	2–1	1–1	4–1	2–1
APOEL	1–0	0–0	2–0	1–0	—	3–1	0–1	1–1	2–0	0–0	3–0	1–0	4–0	1–1
Apollon Limassol	2–1	– (Note: Declared an unplayed match by CFA (not a draw))	2–0	3–0	0–1	—	0–3	1–0	1–0	3–4	2–0	2–1	2–1	1–1
Aris Limassol	1–2	2–1	0–0	2–0	1–1	3–1	—	2–1	2–1	1–2	3–0	5–0	1–1	2–2
Doxa Katokopias	0–1	0–0	2–0	0–0	0–1	0–1	1–2	—	0–3	3–2	0–1	0–0	0–2	0–3
Enosis Neon Paralimni	0–2	0–1	5–0	1–1	1–2	0–1	0–1	1–2	—	0–0	2–0	2–1	0–3	0–2
Karmiotissa	1–3	1–2	1–0	0–2	1–2	1–1	0–0	2–1	1–1	—	1–2	1–0	1–2	0–1
Nea Salamis Famagusta	0–2	2–0	2–1	0–1	1–3	1–1	1–3	1–0	2–0	2–1	—	2–2	2–1	0–2
Olympiakos Nicosia	0–2	0–0	1–0	1–2	0–2	1–1	0–0	2–2	1–2	0–0	0–2	—	0–1	1–1
Omonia	3–2	1–0	1–0	2–0	0–2	2–0	1–2	2–0	4–0	4–0	0–1	4–0	—	0–0
Pafos	1–0	1–0	5–2	1–0	1–2	2–2	1–1	3–1	3–0	4–0	1–2	1–1	3–0	—

Source: Cyprus Football Association
Legend: Blue = home team win; Yellow = draw; Red = away team win.

== Championship round ==
=== Championship round table ===
Pos	Team	Pld	W	D	L	GF	GA	GD	Pts	Qualification	ARI	APOE	AEK	PAF	APOL	OMO
1	Aris Limassol (C)	36	21	11	4	65	28	+37	74	Qualification for the Champions League second qualifying round	—	0–0	4–0	2–1	2–0	1–0
2	APOEL	36	20	11	5	52	26	+26	71	Qualification for the Europa Conference League second qualifying round	4–3	—	2–1	0–0	0–2	0–0
3	AEK Larnaca	36	20	6	10	55	37	+18	66	Qualification for the Europa Conference League second qualifying round	1–1	2–2	—	1–1	0–1	2–0
4	Pafos	36	17	12	7	60	30	+30	63		2–2	1–1	4–0	—	2–1	0–1
5	Apollon Limassol	35	19	5	11	47	37	+10	62		0–1	3–2	1–0	0–1	—	3–1
6	Omonia (Note: Cup winner)	36	15	4	17	43	42	+1	49	Qualification for the Europa Conference League second qualifying round	0–3	1–1	0–2	2–0	1–2	—

Source: Cyprus Football Association
Legend: Blue = home team win; Yellow = draw; Red = away team win.
Rules for classification: 1) Points; 2) Head-to-head points; 3) Head-to-head goal difference; 4) Head-to-head goals scored; 5) Head-to-head away goals scored (only if two teams); 6) Goal difference; 7) Goals scored; 8) Play-off (only if deciding championship round, relegation round or relegation).
(C) Champions

== Relegation round ==
=== Relegation round table ===
Pos	Team	Pld	W	D	L	GF	GA	GD	Pts	Relegation	ANO	NSF	AEL	KAR	DOX	ENP	AKR	OLY
7	Anorthosis Famagusta	40	18	9	13	52	44	+8	63		—	4–4	2–0	0–0	3–1	1–0	2–3	4–1
8	Nea Salamis Famagusta	40	17	7	16	51	55	−4	58		0–2	—	2–3	1–0	1–1	4–2	4–1	3–2
9	AEL Limassol	39	13	10	16	35	40	−5	49		0–2	3–3	—	3–0	1–1	1–0	2–2	0–1
10	Karmiotissa	40	13	9	18	37	54	−17	48		1–2	1–1	2–0	—	2–1	2–1	1–0	0–2
11	Doxa Katokopias	40	10	9	21	32	56	−24	39		0–5	0–1	0–0	2–0	—	0–1	1–3	1–0
12	Enosis Neon Paralimni (R)	40	10	7	23	40	52	−12	37	Relegation to the Cypriot Second Division	0–0	0–0	3–0	0–1	1–2	—	5–1	3–0
13	Akritas Chlorakas (R)	40	9	7	24	37	73	−36	34	Relegation to the Cypriot Second Division	3–1	1–0	1–0	0–0	1–2	2–2	—	2–1
14	Olympiakos Nicosia (R)	40	5	13	22	30	62	−32	28	Relegation to the Cypriot Second Division	1–2	1–0	1–1	1–2	1–2	0–0	2–2	—

Source: Cyprus Football Association
Legend: Blue = home team win; Yellow = draw; Red = away team win.
Rules for classification: 1) Points; 2) Head-to-head points; 3) Head-to-head goal difference; 4) Head-to-head goals scored; 5) Head-to-head away goals scored (only if two teams); 6) Goal difference; 7) Goals scored; 8) Play-off (only if deciding champion or UEFA competitions).
(R) Relegated

== Season statistics ==
=== Top scorers ===
Rank	Player	Club	Goals
1	(Cyprus) Ioannis Pittas	Apollon Limassol	18
1	(Brazil) Jairo	Pafos	18
3	(Argentina) Diego Dorregaray	Nea Salamis Famagusta	16
4	(Russia) Aleksandr Kokorin	Aris Limassol	13
5	(North Macedonia) Ivan Trichkovski	AEK Larnaca	11
6	(Spain) Miguel Ángel Guerrero	Anorthosis Famagusta	10
7	(Austria) Aleksandar Vucenovic	Enosis Neon Paralimni	9
7	(Netherlands) Mounir El Allouchi	Karmiotissa	9
7	(Brazil) Bruno Felipe	Omonia / Pafos	9
10	(Cyprus) Andronikos Kakoullis	Omonia	8
10	(Israel) Omri Altman	AEK Larnaca	8
10	(Sweden) Muamer Tankovic	Pafos	8
