= Marvin Brunswijk =

Dutch footballer

Personal information
- Full name: Marvin Brunswijk
- Date of birth: 24 October 1976 (age 50)
- Place of birth: Rotterdam, Netherlands
- Position: Defender

Youth career
- Feyenoord

Senior career*
Years	Team	Apps	(Gls)
1996–1999	Excelsior	23	(1)
1999–2001	RBC	52	(2)
2001–2002	Stormvogels Telstar	30	(5)
2002–2003	Anorthosis	14	(1)
- * Club domestic league appearances and goals as of 29 August 2011

Marvin Brunswijk (born 24 October 1976 in Rotterdam, Netherlands) is a retired Dutch footballer.

== Club career ==
He made his Eerste Divisie league debut during the 1996–1997 season with club SBV Excelsior. Brunswijk also played for clubs RBC Roosendaal during the 1999–2002 seasons and Stormvogels Telstar.

In July 2003 he left Cypriot side Anorthosis for Dutch amateur side Delta Sport.
